= 1968 =

1968 in various calendars
- Gregorian calendar: 1968; MCMLXVIII
- Ab urbe condita: 2721
- Armenian calendar: 1417; ԹՎ ՌՆԺԷ
- Assyrian calendar: 6718
- Baháʼí calendar: 124–125
- Balinese saka calendar: 1889–1890
- Bengali calendar: 1374–1375
- Berber calendar: 2918
- British Regnal year: 16 Eliz. 2 – 17 Eliz. 2
- Buddhist calendar: 2512
- Burmese calendar: 1330
- Byzantine calendar: 7476–7477
- Chinese calendar: 丁未年 (Fire Goat); 4665 or 4458 — to — 戊申年 (Earth Monkey); 4666 or 4459
- Coptic calendar: 1684–1685
- Discordian calendar: 3134
- Ethiopian calendar: 1960–1961
- Hebrew calendar: 5728–5729
- Hindu calendars
- Vikram Samvat: 2024–2025
- Shaka Samvat: 1889–1890
- Kali Yuga: 5068–5069
- Holocene calendar: 11968
- Igbo calendar: 968–969
- Iranian calendar: 1346–1347
- Islamic calendar: 1387–1388
- Japanese calendar: Shōwa 43 (昭和４３年)
- Javanese calendar: 1899–1900
- Juche calendar: 57
- Julian calendar: Gregorian minus 13 days
- Korean calendar: 4301
- Minguo calendar: ROC 57 民國57年
- Nanakshahi calendar: 500
- Thai solar calendar: 2511
- Tibetan calendar: མེ་མོ་ལུག་ལོ་ (female Fire-Sheep); 2094 or 1713 or 941 — to — ས་ཕོ་སྤྲེ་ལོ་ (male Earth-Monkey); 2095 or 1714 or 942

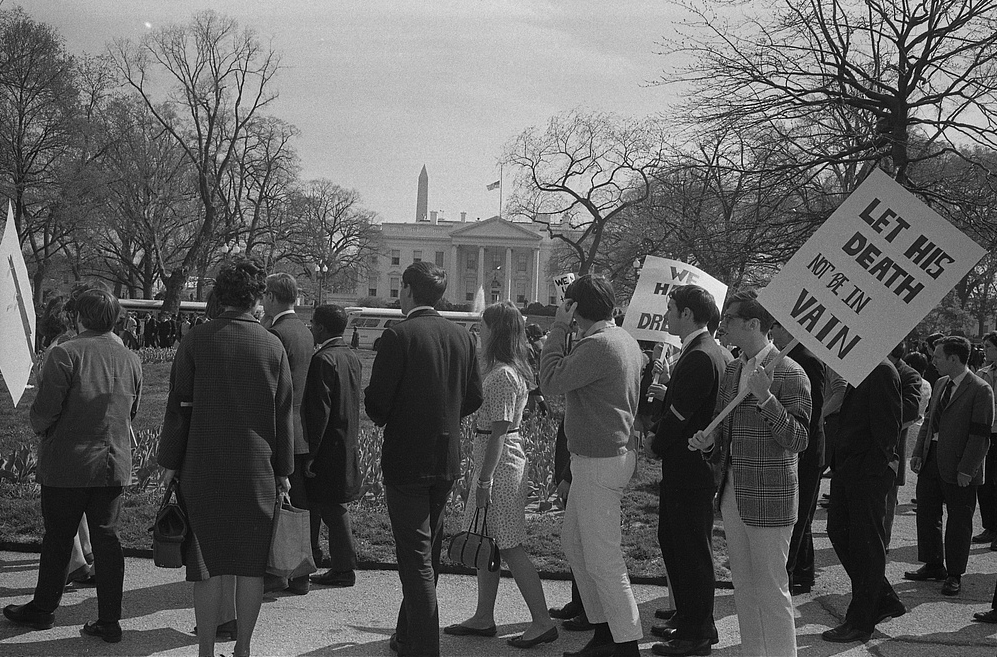
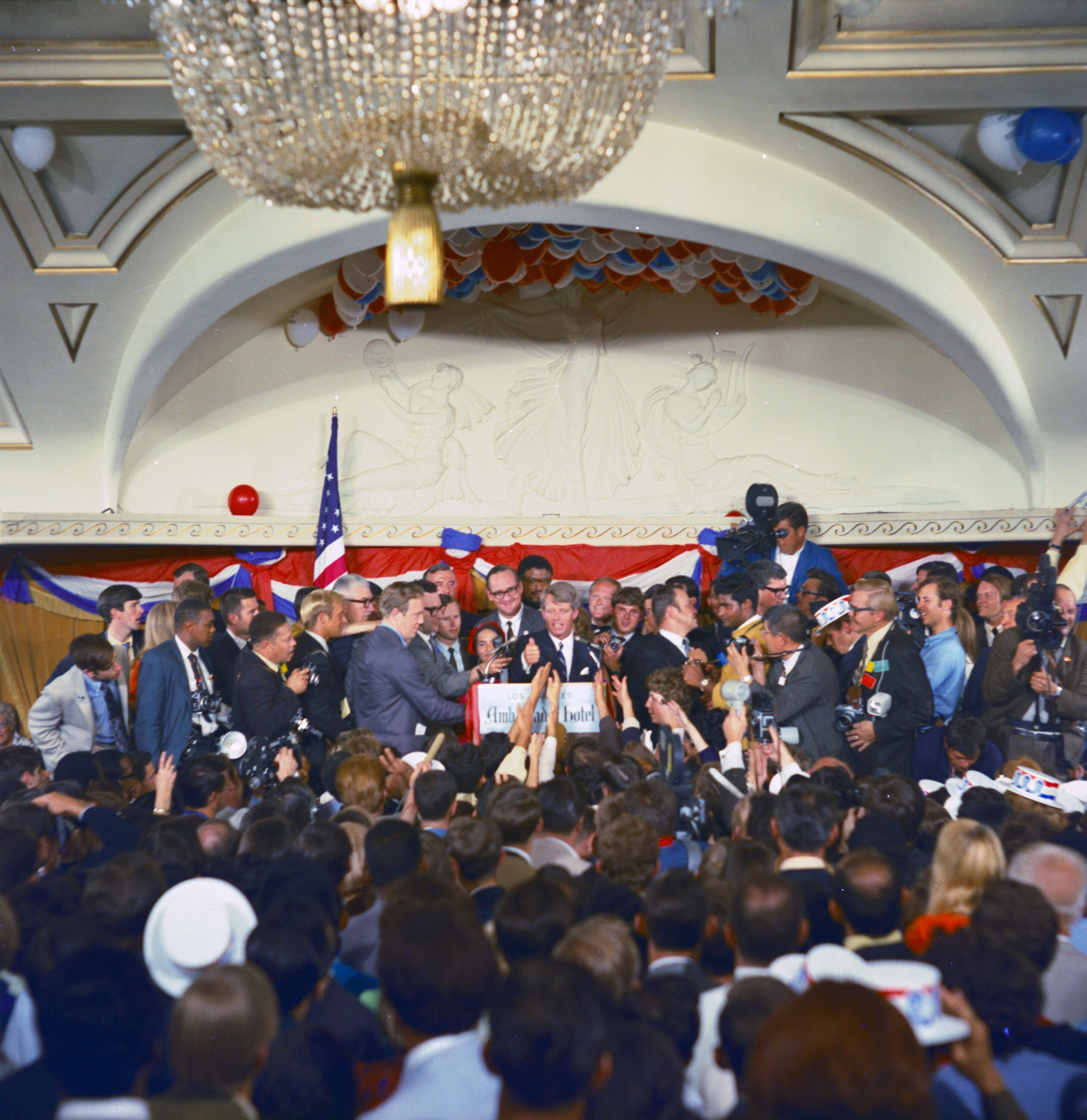
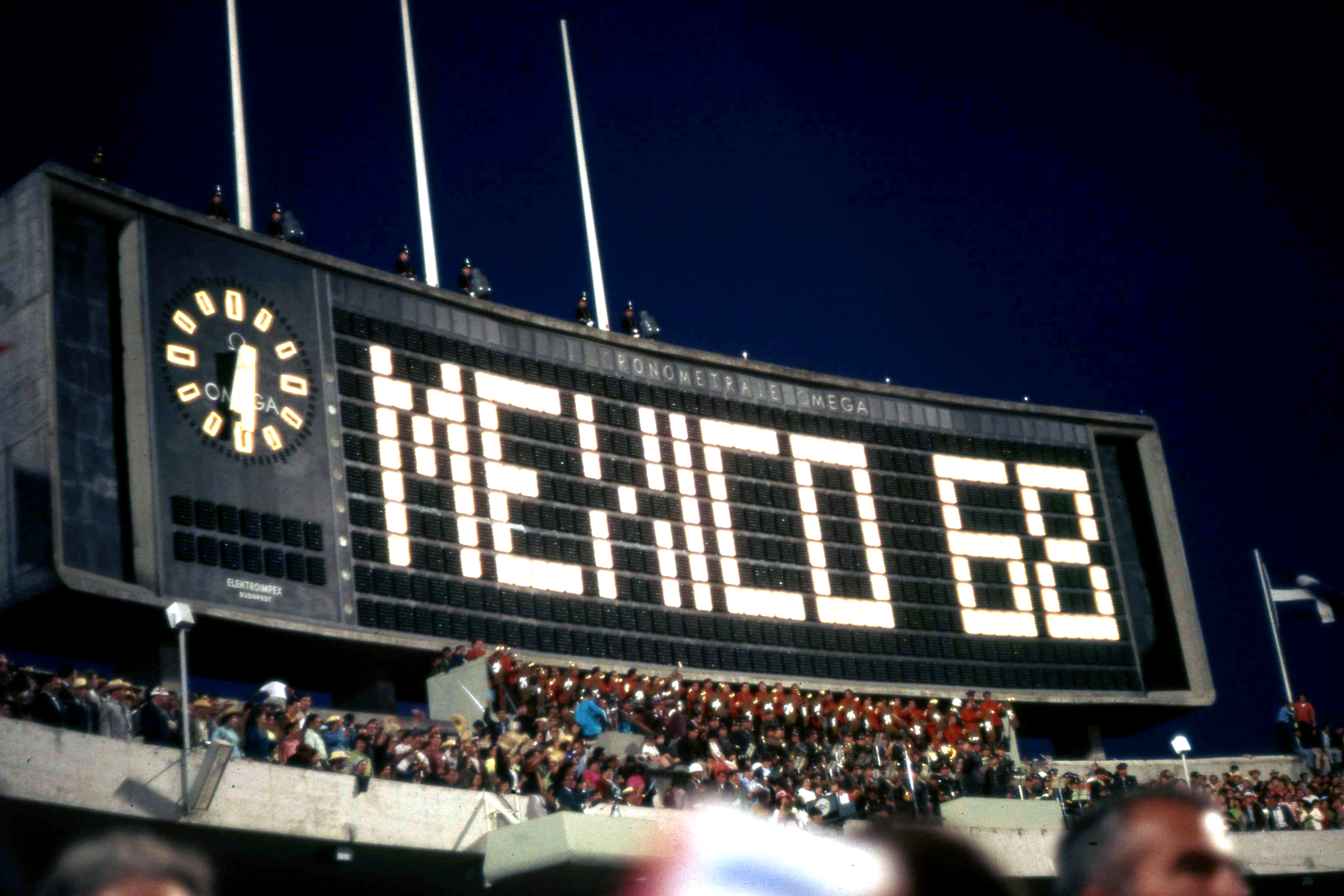
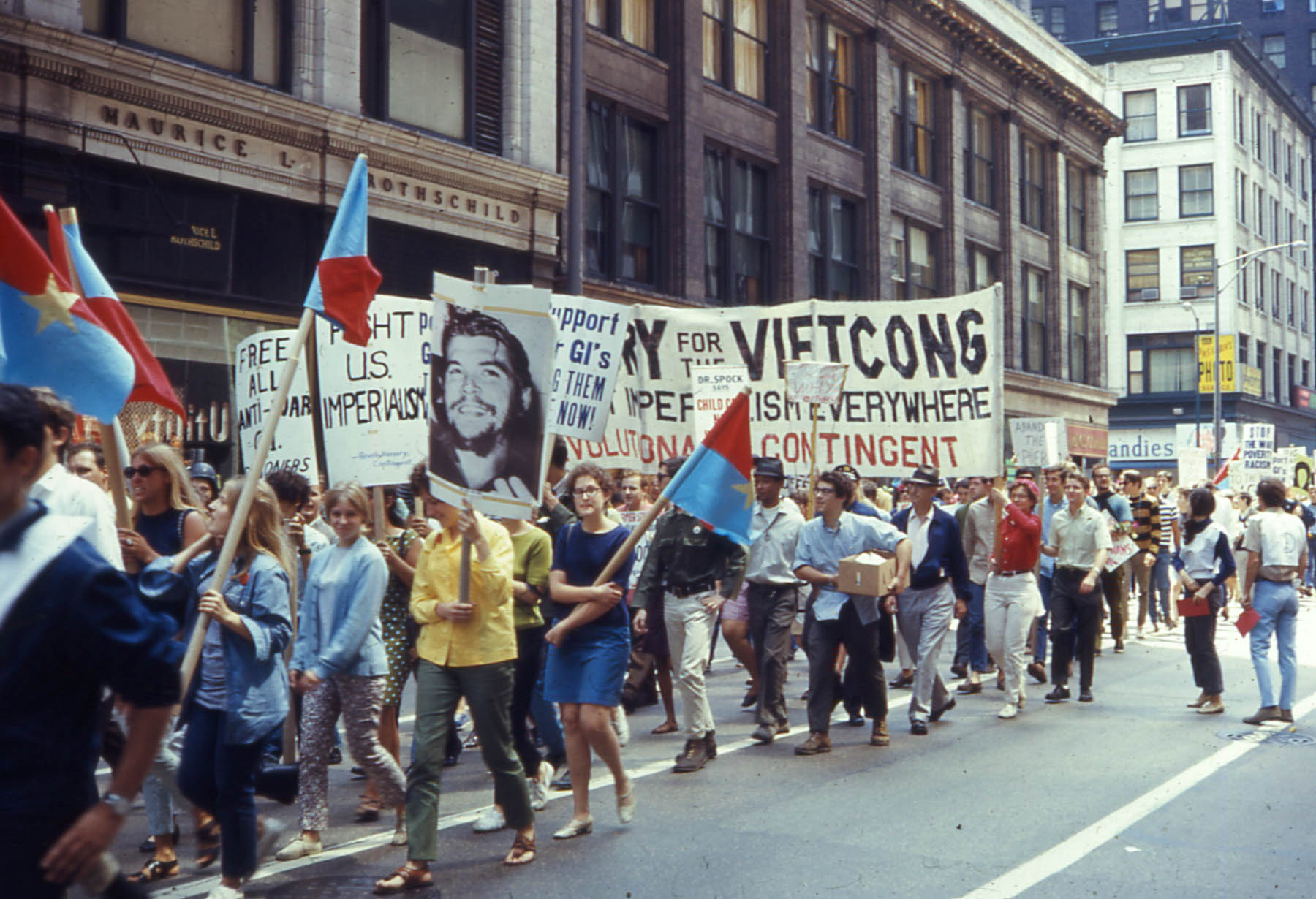
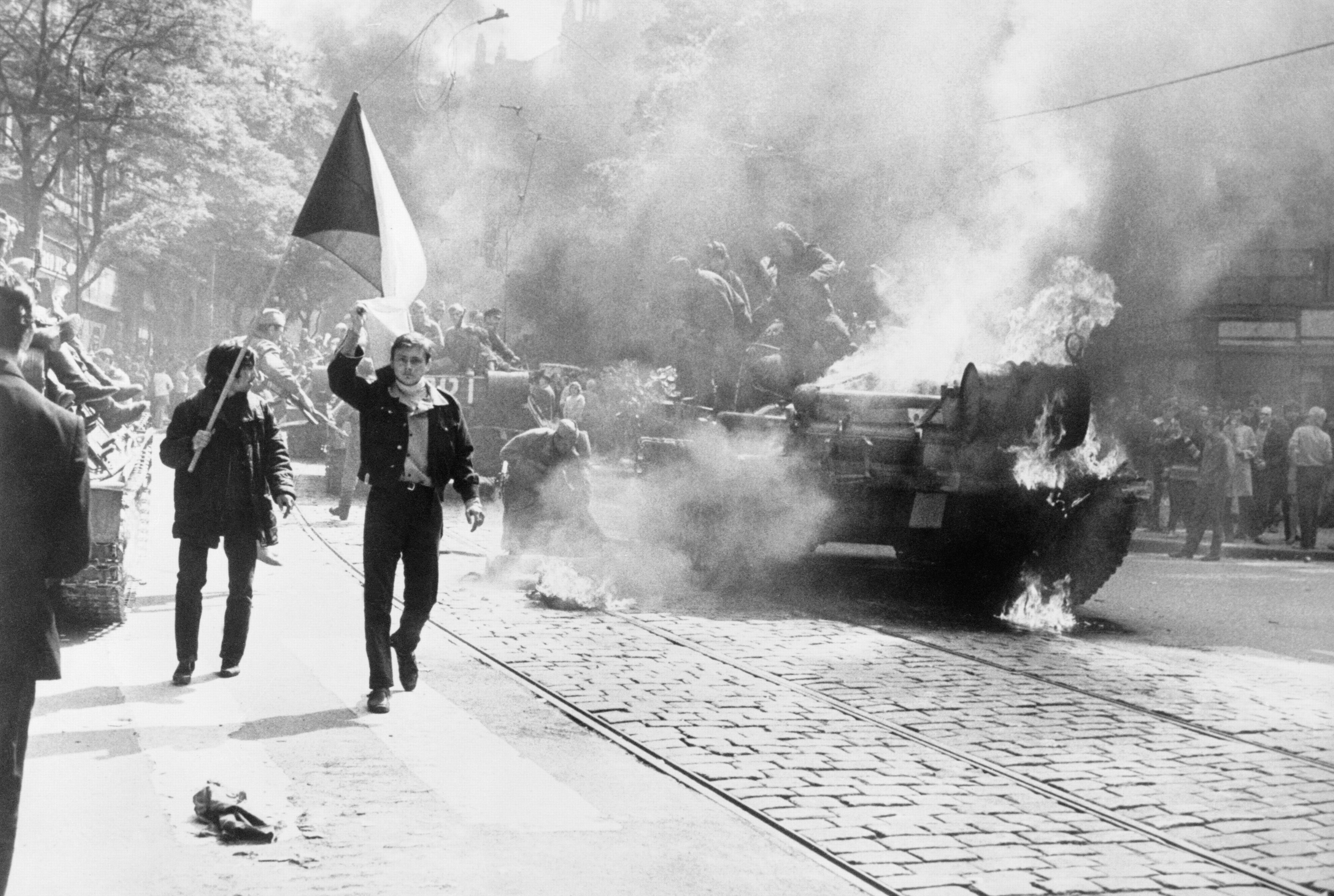
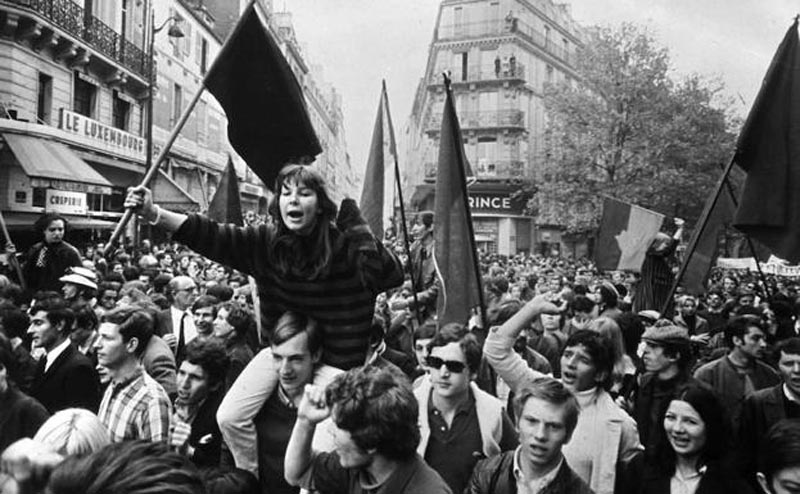
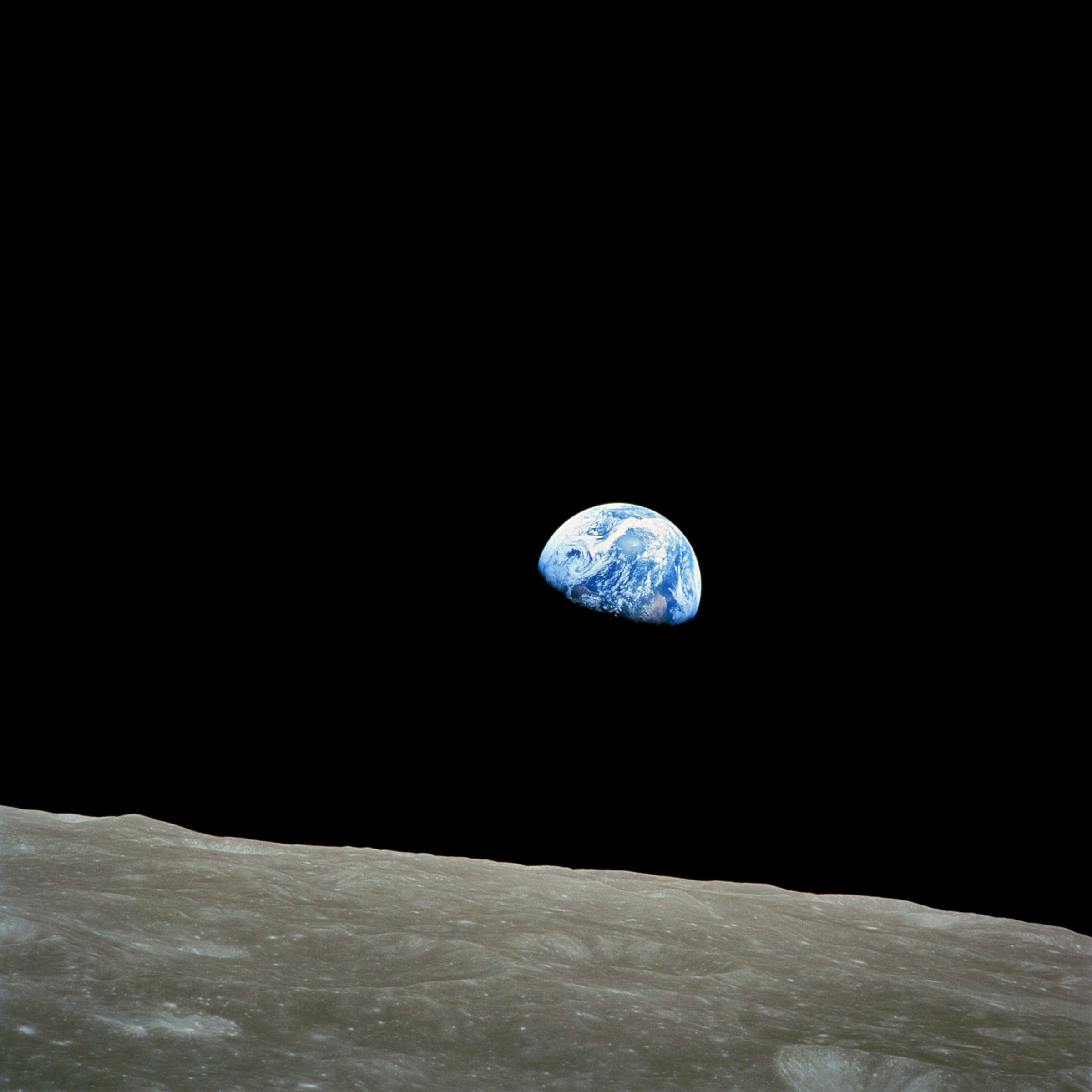
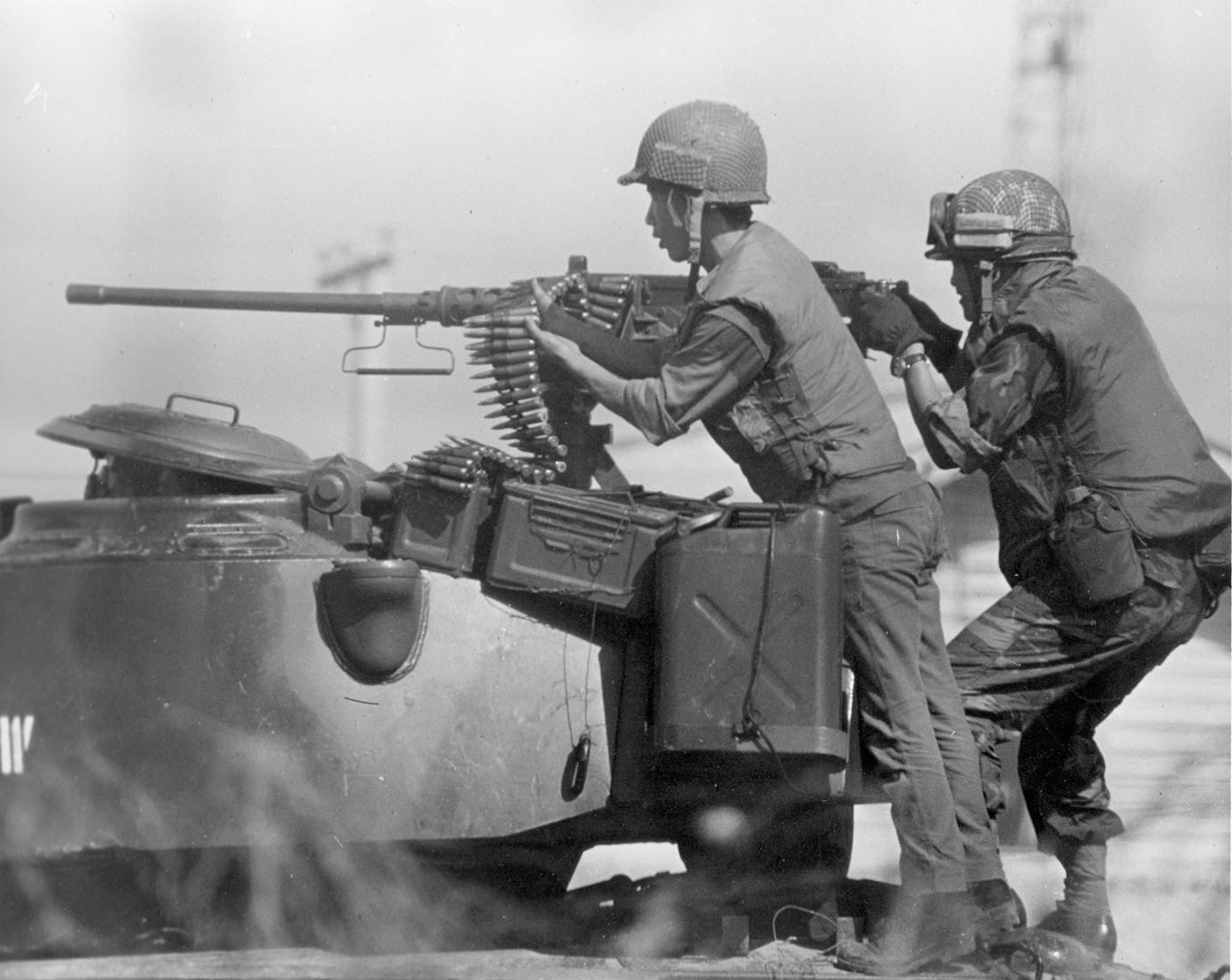
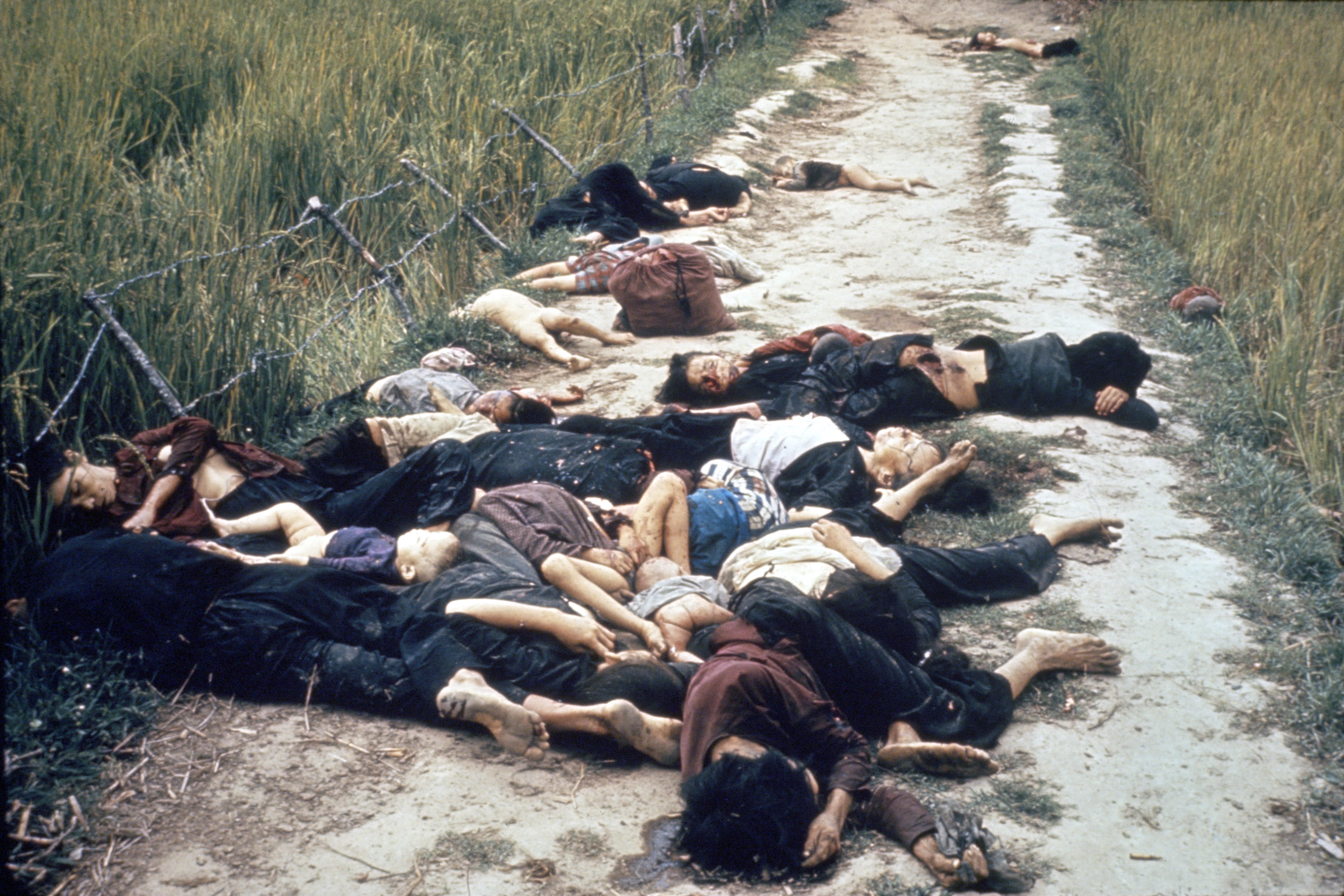
From top to bottom, left to right: Martin Luther King Jr. is assassinated in Memphis, Tennessee, sparking national unrest; Robert F. Kennedy is assassinated in Los Angeles after winning the California Democratic primary; the 1968 Summer Olympics in Mexico City occur under the shadow of the Tlatelolco massacre; protests erupt at the 1968 Democratic National Convention in Chicago; the Prague Spring sees reformist Alexander Dubček crushed by a Warsaw Pact invasion; the May protests mobilize millions of students and workers; Apollo 8 orbits the Moon and captures the iconic Earthrise photo; the Tet Offensive shifts U.S. public opinion on the Vietnam War; and the My Lai massacre results in the deaths of hundreds of civilians, highlighting the war’s moral failures.

1968 (MCMLXVIII) was a leap year starting on Monday of the Gregorian calendar, the 1968th year of the Common Era (CE) and Anno Domini (AD) designations, the 968th year of the 2nd millennium, the 68th year of the 20th century, and the 9th year of the 1960s decade.

== Events ==
=== January–February ===
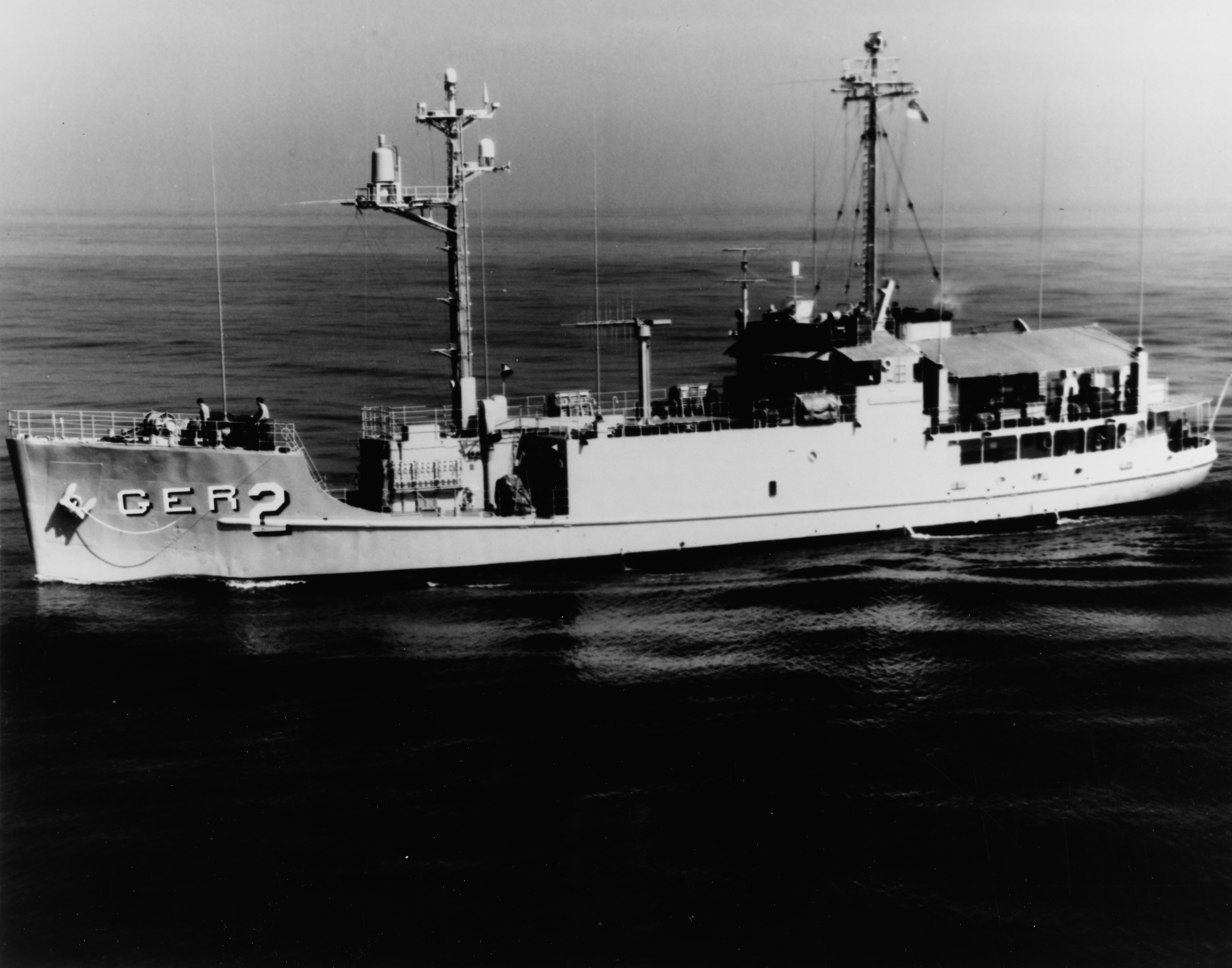
January 23: North Korea seizes USS Pueblo (AGER-2)

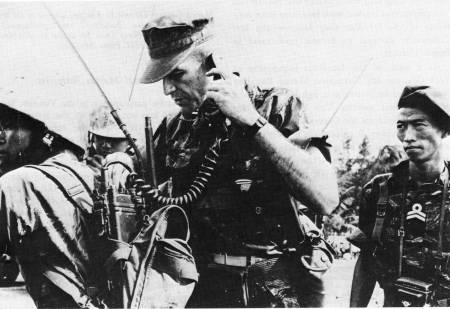
January 30: Tet Offensive begins

- January 5 – Prague Spring: Alexander Dubček is chosen as leader of the Communist Party of Czechoslovakia.
- January 10 – John Gorton is sworn in as 19th Prime Minister of Australia, taking over from John McEwen after being elected leader of the Liberal Party the previous day, following the disappearance of Harold Holt. Gorton becomes the only Senator to become Prime Minister, though he immediately transfers to the House of Representatives through the 1968 Higgins by-election in Holt's vacant seat.
- January 15 – The 1968 Belice earthquake in Sicily kills 380 and injures around 1,000.
- January 21
  - Vietnam War: Siege of Khe Sanh – One of the most publicized and controversial battles of the war begins, ending on April 8.
  - 1968 Thule Air Base B-52 crash: A U.S. B-52 Stratofortress crashes in Greenland, discharging 4 nuclear bombs.
- January 23 – North Korea seizes the USS Pueblo, claiming the ship has violated its territorial waters while spying.
- January 25 – Israeli submarine INS Dakar sinks in the Mediterranean Sea, killing 69.
- January 28 – French submarine Minerve sinks in the Mediterranean Sea, killing 52.
- January 30 – Vietnam War: The Tet Offensive begins as Viet Cong forces launch a series of surprise attacks across South Vietnam.
- January 31
  - Viet Cong soldiers attack the Embassy of the United States, Saigon.
  - Nauru president Hammer DeRoburt declares independence from Australia, Britain and New Zealand.
- February 1
  - Vietnam War: Execution of Nguyễn Văn Lém – A Viet Cong officer is summarily executed by Nguyễn Ngọc Loan, a South Vietnamese National Police Chief. The event is photographed by Eddie Adams. The photo makes headlines around the world, eventually winning the 1969 Pulitzer Prize, and sways U.S. public opinion against the war.
  - The Pennsylvania Railroad and the New York Central Railroad merge to form Penn Central, the largest ever corporate merger up to this date.
- February 6–18 – The 1968 Winter Olympics are held in Grenoble, France.
- February 8 – Civil rights movement in the United States: Orangeburg Massacre – A civil rights demonstration on a college campus to protest de facto racial segregation in South Carolina is broken up by highway patrolmen; three African American students are killed, the first instance of police killing student protestors at an American campus.
- February 12 – Vietnam War: Phong Nhị and Phong Nhất massacre.
- February 19 – The television series Mister Rogers' Neighborhood premieres on National Educational Television in the United States and becomes one of the longest running children's shows ever.
- February 24 – Vietnam War: The Tet Offensive is halted; South Vietnam recaptures Huế.
- February 25 – Vietnam War: Hà My massacre.

=== March–April ===
- March 1
  - Commonwealth Immigrants Act 1968 further reduces right of entry for citizens from the British Commonwealth to the United Kingdom.
  - First performance of an Andrew Lloyd Webber–Tim Rice musical, Joseph and the Amazing Technicolor Dreamcoat in its original form as a "pop cantata", by pupils of a private school in London.
- March 2 – Baggeridge Colliery closes marking the end of over 300 years of coal mining in the Black Country of England.
- March 3 – Air France Flight 212, a Boeing 707, crashes in Guadeloupe while approaching an airport. As a result, 63 people die.
- March 6 – Un-recognized Rhodesia executes 3 black citizens, the first executions since UDI, prompting international condemnation.
- March 7 – Vietnam War: The First Battle of Saigon ends.
- March 8
  - The first student protests spark the 1968 Polish political crisis.
  - The Soviet ballistic missile submarine K-129 sinks with all 98 crew members, about 90 nautical miles (104 miles or 167 km) southwest of Hawaii.
- March 10–11 – Vietnam War: Battle of Lima Site 85, the largest single ground combat loss of United States Air Force members (12) during the (at this time) secret war later known as the Laotian Civil War.
- March 11 – U.S. President Lyndon B. Johnson mandates that all computers purchased by the federal government support the ASCII character encoding.
- March 12
  - Mauritius achieves independence from British rule.
  - U.S. President Lyndon B. Johnson barely edges out antiwar candidate Eugene McCarthy in the New Hampshire Democratic primary, a vote which highlights the deep divisions in the country, and the party, over Vietnam.
- March 13 – The first Rotaract club is chartered in North Charlotte, North Carolina.
- March 14
  - Late this evening, the U.K. government at the request of the U.S. agrees that the London Gold Pool will be closed from tomorrow. George Brown, the British Foreign Secretary, apparently drunk, is absent from meetings to discuss the crisis and is forced to resign from the government on March 15.
  - Nerve gas leaks from the U.S. Army Dugway Proving Ground near Skull Valley, Utah.
- March 16 – Vietnam War – My Lai massacre: American troops kill between 347 and 504 unarmed civilians and rape women and children. The story, initially covered up as a military victory, will first become public in November 1969 and will help undermine public support for the U.S. efforts in Vietnam.
- March 18 – Gold standard: The United States Congress repeals the requirement for a gold reserve to back U.S. currency.
- Jabidah massacre
- March 19–23 – Afrocentrism, Black Power, Vietnam War: Students at Howard University in Washington, D.C., signal a new era of militant student activism on college campuses in the U.S. Students stage rallies, protests and a 5-day sit-in, laying siege to the administration building, shutting down the university in protest over its ROTC program and the Vietnam War, and demanding a more Afrocentric curriculum.
- March 22 – René Riesel and 7 other enragés students occupy the administrative offices of the new Nanterre campus of the University of Paris as part of protests over a rigid educational system, setting in motion a chain of 'May 68' events that lead France to the brink of revolution.
- March 24 – Aer Lingus Flight 712 crashes en route from Cork to London near Tuskar Rock, Wexford, killing 61 passengers and crew.
- March 28 – Brazilian high school student Edson Luís de Lima Souto is shot by the police in a protest for cheaper meals at a restaurant for low-income students, leading to one of the first major protests against the military dictatorship.
- April 2 – Bombs explode at midnight in two department stores in Frankfurt-am-Main; Andreas Baader and Gudrun Ensslin are later arrested and sentenced for arson.
- April 4
  - Assassination of Martin Luther King Jr.: Martin Luther King Jr. is shot dead at the Lorraine Motel in Memphis, Tennessee by James Earl Ray. King-assassination riots erupt in major American cities, lasting for several days afterwards.
  - Apollo program: Apollo-Saturn mission 502 (Apollo 6) is launched, as the second and last uncrewed test-flight of the Saturn V launch vehicle.
  - AEK Athens wins the FIBA European Cup Winners Cup Final in basketball against Slavia Prague, in front of a record attendance of 80,000 spectators. It is the first major European trophy won at club level of any sport in Greece.
- April 6
  - 13th Eurovision Song Contest is held in the Royal Albert Hall, London, UK. The winning song, Spain's "La, la, la" (music and lyrics by Manuel de la Calva and Ramón Arcusa) is sung in Spanish by Massiel after Spanish authorities refuse to allow Joan Manuel Serrat to perform it in Catalan. The United Kingdom finishes in second place, one point behind, with the song "Congratulations" sung by Cliff Richard, which goes on to outsell the winning Spanish entry throughout Europe.
  - A shootout between Black Panthers and police in Oakland, California, United States, results in several arrests and deaths, including 17-year-old Panther Bobby Hutton.
  - Richmond, Indiana explosion: A double explosion in downtown Richmond caused by a methane leak kills 41 and injures 150.
- April 10 – The ferry TEV Wahine strikes a reef at the mouth of Wellington Harbour, New Zealand, with the loss of 53 lives, in Cyclone Giselle, which has created the windiest conditions ever recorded in New Zealand.
- April 11
  - Josef Bachmann tries to assassinate Rudi Dutschke, leader of the left-wing movement (APO) in Germany, and tries to commit suicide afterwards, failing in both, although Dutschke dies of his brain injuries 11 years later.
  - German left-wing students blockade the Springer Press headquarters in Berlin and many are arrested (one of them Ulrike Meinhof).
- April 18 – London Bridge is sold to U.S. entrepreneur Robert P. McCulloch for reconstruction at Lake Havasu City, Arizona.
- April 20
  - Pierre Elliott Trudeau becomes the 15th Prime Minister of Canada.
  - Conservative British politician Enoch Powell makes a controversial "Rivers of Blood" speech in Birmingham deploring the effects of immigration; he is dismissed from the Shadow Cabinet the following day.
  - South African Airways Flight 228 a Boeing 707 crashed shortly after take-off killing 123 people on board.
- April 23
  - President Mobutu releases captured mercenaries in the Congo.
  - Surgeons at the Hôpital de la Pitié, Paris, perform Europe's first heart transplant, on Clovis Roblain.
  - The United Methodist Church is created by the union in Dallas, Texas, of the former Methodist and Evangelical United Brethren churches.
- April 23–30 – Vietnam War: Columbia University protests of 1968 – Student protesters at Columbia University in New York City take over administration buildings and shut down the university.
- April 26 – The nuclear weapon "Boxcar" is tested at the Nevada Test Site in the biggest detonation of Operation Crosstie.

=== May–June ===
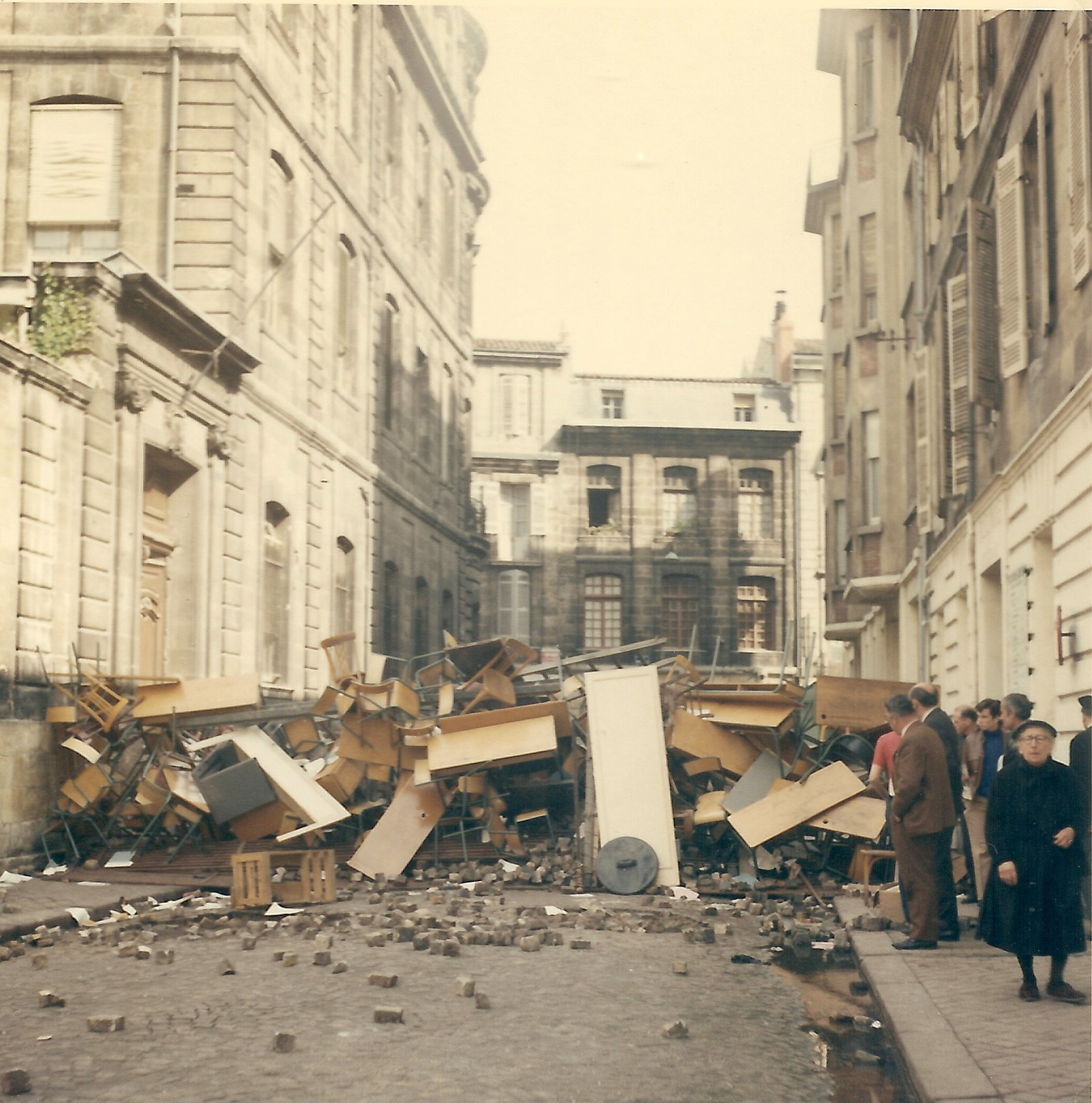
May 2–June 23: Protests in France grow and demonstrators barricade the streets

- May 1 – CARIFTA, the Caribbean Free Trade Association, is formally created as an agreement between Antigua and Barbuda, Barbados, Guyana, and Trinidad and Tobago.
- May 2
  - The Israel Broadcasting Authority commences television broadcasts.
  - May 68: Authorities close the Nanterre campus of the University of Paris and the focus of protest moves to the Sorbonne.
- May 3 – Braniff Flight 352 crashes near Dawson, Texas, United States, killing all 85 people on board.
- May 6 – May 68: Student protestors begin battling with police on the streets of Paris.
- May 13
  - May 68: Major left trade union federations in France call a 1-day general strike and join student protesters in a million-strong march through the streets of Paris.
  - Manchester City wins the 1967–68 Football League First Division by 2 clear points, over English club rivals Manchester United.
- May 16 – Ronan Point, a 23 floor tower block in Canning Town, east London, partially collapses after a gas explosion, killing 5.
- May 17 – The Catonsville Nine enter the Selective Service offices in Catonsville, Maryland, take dozens of selective service draft records, and burn them with napalm as a protest against the Vietnam War.
- May 19
  - 1968 Italian general election.
  - Nigerian forces capture Port Harcourt and form a ring around the Biafrans. This contributes to a humanitarian disaster as the surrounded population already suffers from hunger and starvation.
- May 22 – The U.S. nuclear-powered submarine Scorpion sinks with 99 men aboard, 400 miles southwest of the Azores.
- May 27 – May 68: Grenelle agreements concluded in France, giving a large increase in minimum wages, but are rejected by trade unions.
- May 29
  - May 68: President de Gaulle of France leaves Paris without telling his prime minister, Georges Pompidou, where he is going – which is in fact to the headquarters of the French Forces in Germany at Baden-Baden to assure himself of military support.
  - Manchester United F.C. wins the European Cup Final, becoming the first English team to do so.
- May 30
  - May 68: With hundreds of thousands marching on the streets of Paris, President de Gaulle calls an election, which has the effect of calming the situation.
  - Bobby Unser wins the Indianapolis 500 automobile race.
- June 2 – Student demonstrations in Yugoslavia start in Belgrade.
- June 3 – Radical feminist Valerie Solanas shoots Andy Warhol at his New York City studio, The Factory; he survives after a 5-hour operation.
- June 4 – The Standard & Poor's 500 index in the United States closes above 100 for the first time, at 100.38.
- June 5 – Assassination of Robert F. Kennedy: Senator Robert F. Kennedy, a leading 1968 Democratic presidential candidate, is shot at the Ambassador Hotel in Los Angeles. Palestinian-born Sirhan Sirhan is arrested.
- June 7 – Ford sewing machinists strike for equal pay starts at the Ford Dagenham plant in London.
- June 10 – Italy beats Yugoslavia 2–0 in a replay to win the 1968 European Championship in Association football. The original final on June 8 ended 1–1.
- June 12 – The horror film Rosemary's Baby premieres in the U.S.
- June 17 – The Malayan Communist Party launches a second insurgency and the state of emergency is again imposed in Malaysia.
- June 20 – Austin Currie, Member of the Parliament of Northern Ireland, along with others, squats in a house in Caledon to protest discrimination in housing allocations.
- June 21 – A student demonstration in front of the Jornal do Brasil ("JB") building in Rio de Janeiro ends with 28 dead and over a thousand arrested.
- June 23 – Puerta 12 tragedy: A football stampede in Buenos Aires leaves 74 dead and 150 injured.
- June 23–30 – 1968 French legislative election: The Gaullist Union pour la défense de la République becomes the first party in French political history to obtain an absolute majority in the National Assembly. George Pompidou leads the party through the campaign but resigns as prime minister afterwards. The public unrest of May 68 subsides.
- June 26
  - The Bonin Islands are returned to Japan after 23 years of occupation by the United States Navy.
  - The "March of the One Hundred Thousand" takes place in Rio de Janeiro as crowds demonstrate against the Brazilian military government.

=== July–August ===
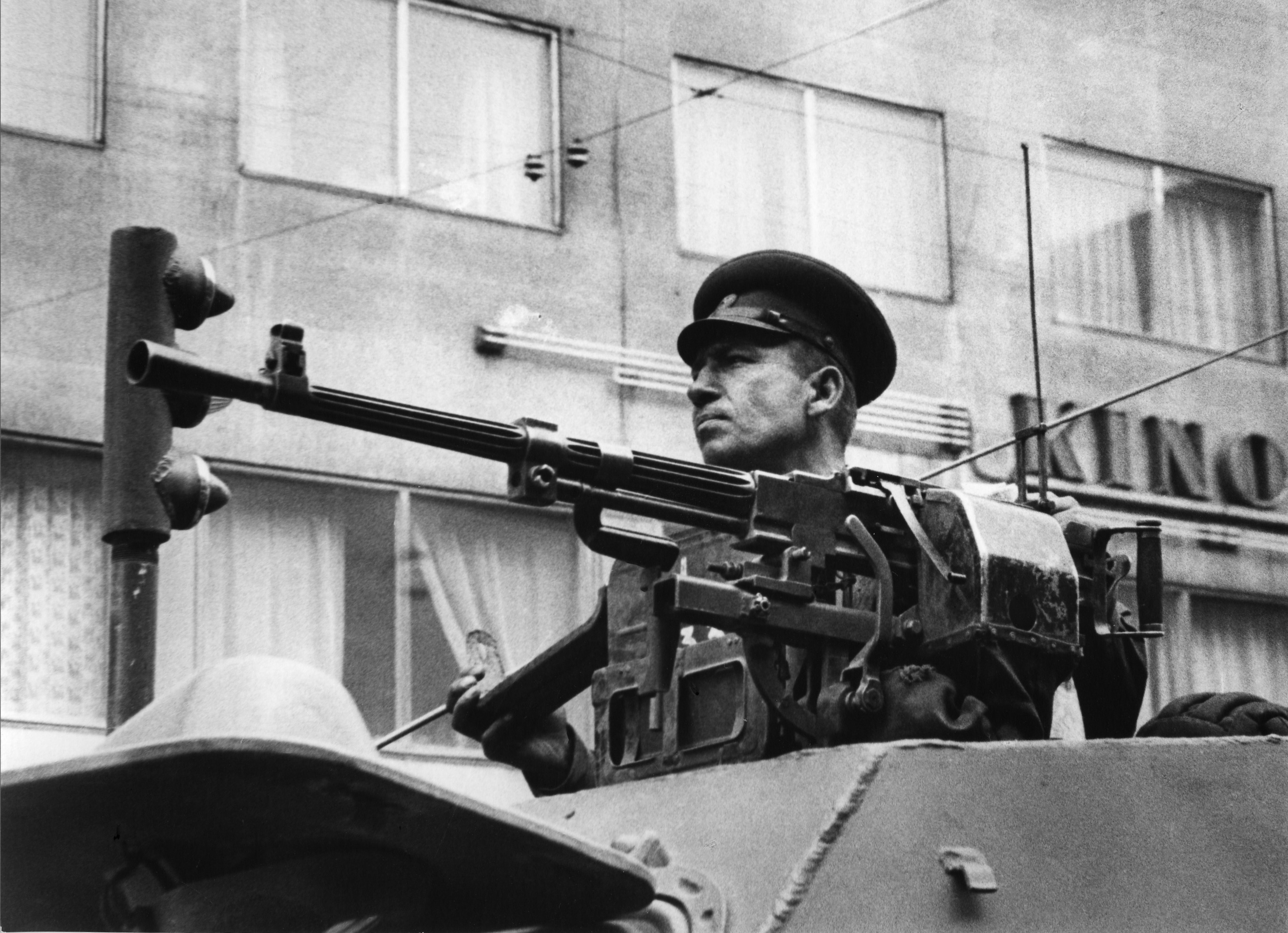
August 20–21: Warsaw Pact invades Czechoslovakia

- July 1 – The Nuclear Non-Proliferation Treaty opens for signature.
- July 4 – English yachtsman Alec Rose, 59, receives a hero's welcome as he sails into Portsmouth, after his 354-day solo round-the-world trip.
- July 17 – Saddam Hussein becomes Vice Chairman of the Revolutionary Council in Iraq after a coup d'état.
- July 18 – The semiconductor company Intel is founded in what becomes known as the Silicon Valley of California.
- July 20 – The first International Special Olympics Summer Games are held at Soldier Field in Chicago, Ill, with about 1,000 athletes with intellectual disabilities.
- July 23–28 – Black militants led by Fred (Ahmed) Evans engage in a fierce gunfight with police in the Glenville Shootout of Cleveland, Ohio, in the United States, leaving 7 people killed.
- July 25 – Pope Paul VI publishes the encyclical Humanae vitae, reaffirming the Catholic Church's opposition to artificial birth control.
- July 25- Tysons Corner Center one of the largest malls in the U.S. opens to the public and the Washington DC area.
- July 26 – Vietnam War: South Vietnamese opposition leader Trương Đình Dzu is sentenced to 5 years hard labor for advocating the formation of a coalition government as a way to move toward an end to the war.
- July 29 – Arenal Volcano erupts in Costa Rica for the first time in centuries.
- August 1 – The Municipal University of São Caetano do Sul is established in São Caetano do Sul, São Paulo.
- August 2 – The magnitude (M_{w}) 7.6 Casiguran earthquake affects the Aurora province in the Philippines with a maximum Mercalli intensity of IX (Violent), killing at least 207 and injuring 261.
- August 5–8 – The Republican National Convention in Miami Beach, Florida nominates Richard Nixon for U.S. president and Spiro Agnew for vice president.
- August 11 – The last steam passenger train service runs in Britain. A selection of British Rail steam locomotives make the 120-mile journey from Liverpool to Carlisle and return – the journey is known as the Fifteen Guinea Special.
- August 18 – Two charter buses are forced into the Hida River on National Highway Route 41 in Japan in an accident caused by heavy rain; 104 are killed.
- August 20–21 – Warsaw Pact invasion of Czechoslovakia: The 'Prague Spring' of political liberalization ends, as 750,000 Warsaw Pact troops and 6,500 tanks with 800 aircraft invade Czechoslovakia, the largest military operation in Europe since the end of World War II.
- August 24 – Canopus (nuclear test): France explodes its first hydrogen bomb in a test at Fangataufa atoll in French Polynesia.
- August 22–30 – 1968 Democratic National Convention protests: Police clash with anti-Vietnam War protesters in Chicago outside the 1968 Democratic National Convention, which nominates Hubert Humphrey for U.S. president and Edmund Muskie for vice president. The riots and subsequent trials are an essential part of the activism of the Youth International Party.
- August 29 – Crown Prince Harald of Norway marries Sonja Haraldsen, the commoner he has dated for 9 years.

=== September–October ===
October 12–27: 1968 Summer Olympics held in Mexico City

- September 6 – Swaziland (later known as Eswatini) becomes independent of the United Kingdom.
- September 7 – The crash of Air France Flight 1611 kills 95 people, including French Army General René Cogny, as the Caravelle jetliner plunges into the Mediterranean Sea following a fire while making its approach to Nice following its departure from the island of Corsica.
- September 11
  - The International Association of Classification Societies (IACS) is founded.
  - John Eliot Gardiner conducts Monteverdi's Vespro della Beata Vergine with the Monteverdi Choir at the BBC Proms in London.
- September 13 – Albania officially withdraws from the Warsaw Pact upon the Soviet Union-led Warsaw Pact invasion of Czechoslovakia, having already ceased to participate actively in Pact activity since 1962.
- September 17 – The D'Oliveira affair: The Marylebone Cricket Club tour of South Africa is cancelled when the South Africans refuse to accept the presence of Basil D'Oliveira, a Cape Coloured, in the England side.
- September 21 – The Soviet Zond 5 uncrewed lunar flyby mission returns to Earth, with its first-of-a-kind biological payload intact.
- September 23 – Vietnam War: The Tet Offensive comes to an end in South Vietnam.
- September 27 – Marcelo Caetano becomes prime minister of Portugal.
- September 29 – A referendum in Greece gives more power to the military junta.
- October 2 – Tlatelolco massacre: A student demonstration ends in bloodbath at La Plaza de las Tres Culturas in Tlatelolco, Mexico City, Mexico, 10 days before the inauguration of the 1968 Summer Olympics. 300-400 are estimated to have been killed.
- October 3 – In Peru, Juan Velasco Alvarado takes power in a revolution.
- October 8 – Vietnam War: Operation Sealords – United States and South Vietnamese forces launch a new operation in the Mekong Delta.
- October 10 – The Detroit Tigers win the 1968 World Series in baseball in seven games.
- October 11
  - Apollo program: NASA launches Apollo 7, the first crewed Apollo mission (Wally Schirra, Donn Eisele, Walter Cunningham). Mission goals include the first live television broadcast from orbit and simulating lunar module rendezvous and docking, using the S-IVB rocket stage as a test target.
  - In Panama, a military coup d'état, led by Col. Boris Martinez and Col. Omar Torrijos, overthrows the democratically elected (but highly controversial) government of President Arnulfo Arias. Within a year, Torrijos ousts Martinez and takes charge as de facto Head of Government in Panama.
- October 12–27 – The 1968 Summer Olympics are held in Mexico City, Mexico.
- October 12 – Equatorial Guinea receives its independence from Spain.
- October 14 – Vietnam War: The United States Department of Defense announces that the United States Army and United States Marines will send about 24,000 troops back to Vietnam for involuntary second tours.
- October 16
  - 1968 Olympics Black Power salute: In Mexico City, African-American athletes Tommie Smith and John Carlos raise their fists in a Black Power salute after winning, respectively, the gold and bronze medals in the Olympic men's 200 metres (with the support of Australian silver medallist Peter Norman).
  - Kingston, Jamaica is rocked by the Rodney Riots, provoked by the banning of Guyanese-born academic and activist Walter Rodney from the country.
- October 18 – U.S. athlete Bob Beamon breaks the long jump world record by 55 cm / 21 3/4 ins at the Olympics in Mexico City. His record stands for 23 years, and remains the second longest jump in history.
- October 25 – Rock band Led Zeppelin make their first live performance, at Surrey University in England
- October 31 – Vietnam War: Citing progress in the Paris peace talks (which began on May 13), U.S. President Lyndon B. Johnson announces to the nation that he has ordered a complete cessation of "all air, naval, and artillery bombardment of North Vietnam" effective November 1.
- October 31 – Great Drought of 1968: Amidst a collapse of hydropower President of Chile Eduardo Frei Montalva decrees the establishment of daylight saving time.

=== November–December ===
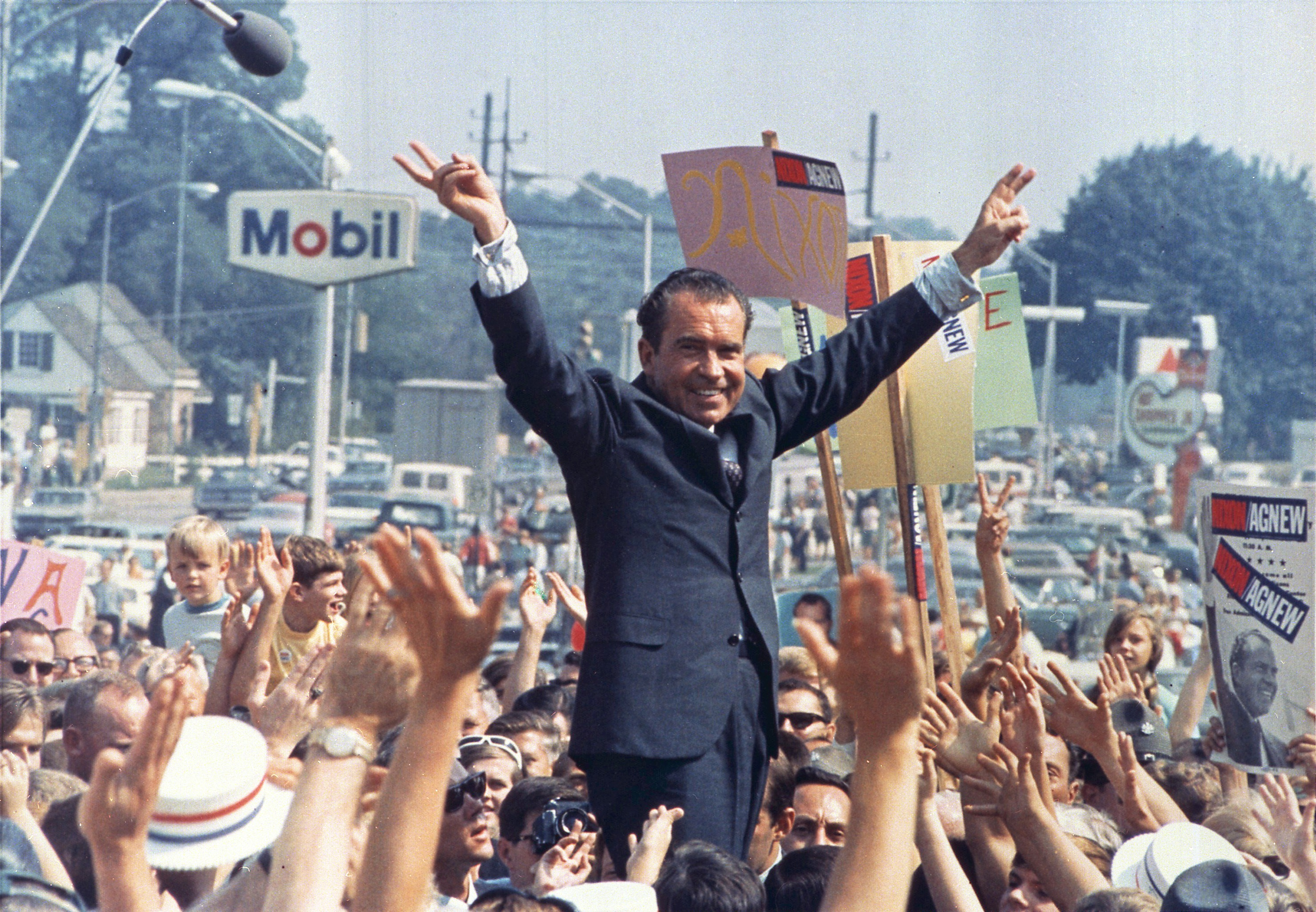
November 5: Richard Nixon elected United States President

- November 5
  - 1968 United States presidential election: Republican candidate Richard Nixon defeats the Democratic candidate, Vice President Hubert Humphrey, and American Independent Party candidate George Wallace.
  - Luis A. Ferré of the newly formed New Progressive Party is elected Governor of Puerto Rico by beating incumbent governor Roberto Sánchez Vilella of the People's Party, Luis Negrón López of the Popular Democratic Party and Antonio J. Gonzalez of the Puerto Rican Independence Party; he also becomes the first "statehooder" governor of the Island.
- November 7 – Start of the 1968 movement in Pakistan, which leads to the resignation of General Ayub Khan, and ultimately the split of the country and formation of Bangladesh.
- November 8 – The Vienna Convention on Road Signs and Signals is signed and ratified.
- November 11 – A second republic is declared in the Maldives.
- November 15 – Vietnam War: Operation Commando Hunt is initiated to interdict men and supplies on the Ho Chi Minh trail, through Laos into South Vietnam. By the end of the operation, 3 million tons of bombs are dropped on Laos, slowing but not seriously disrupting trail operations.
- November 19 – In Mali, President Modibo Keïta's regime is overthrown in a bloodless military coup led by Moussa Traoré.
- November 20 – The Farmington Mine disaster in Farmington, West Virginia, United States, kills seventy-eight men.
- November 22 – Japan Air Lines Flight 2, flying from Tokyo to San Francisco International Airport ditches in San Francisco Bay due to pilot error; all 107 on board survive without injury.
- November 24 – 4 men hijack Pan Am Flight 281 from JFK International Airport, New York to Havana, Cuba.
- December 9 – Douglas Engelbart publicly demonstrates his pioneering hypertext system, NLS, in San Francisco, together with the computer mouse, at what becomes retrospectively known as "The Mother of All Demos".
- December 10 – Japan's biggest heist, the never-solved "300 million yen robbery", occurs in Tokyo.
- December 11 – The film Oliver! based on the hit London and Broadway musical, opens in the U.S. after being released first in the UK. It goes on to win the Academy Award for Best Picture.
- December 13 – Prompted by growing unrest and a perceived proliferation of "pro-communist" violent actions, Brazilian president Artur da Costa e Silva enacts the so-called AI-5, the fifth of a series of non-constitutional emergency decrees allegedly to help "stabilize" the country after the turmoils of the early 1960s.
- December 22 – Mao Zedong advocates that educated urban youth in China be sent for re-education in the countryside. It marks the start of the "Up to the mountains and down to the villages" movement.
- December 24 – Apollo program: The crewed U.S. spacecraft Apollo 8 enters orbit around the Moon. Astronauts Frank Borman, Jim Lovell and William Anders become the first humans to see the far side of the Moon and planet Earth as a whole, as well as having traveled further away from Earth than any people in history. Anders photographs Earthrise. The crew also give a reading from the Book of Genesis.
- December 28 – 1968 Israeli raid on Lebanon: Israeli forces fly into Lebanese airspace, launching an attack on the airport in Beirut and destroying more than a dozen aircraft.

=== Dates unknown ===
- The Khmer Rouge is officially formed in Cambodia as an offshoot movement of the Vietnam People's Army from North Vietnam to bring communism to the nation. A few years later, they will become bitter enemies.
- Drainage of the Flevopolder in the Netherlands is completed, creating by some definitions the largest artificial island in the world.

== Births ==
=== January ===
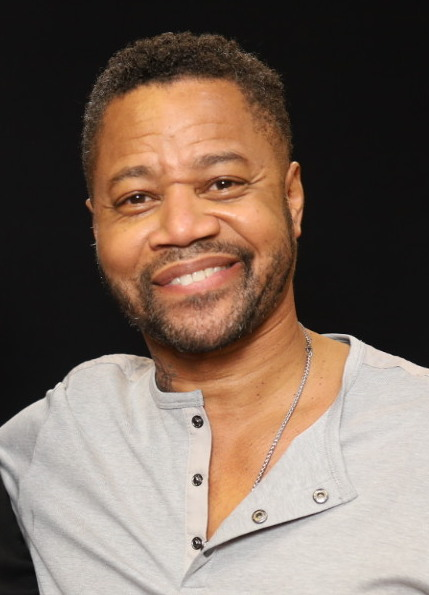
Cuba Gooding Jr.

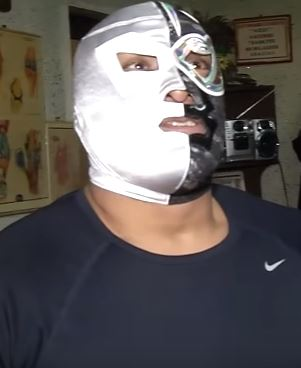
Silver King

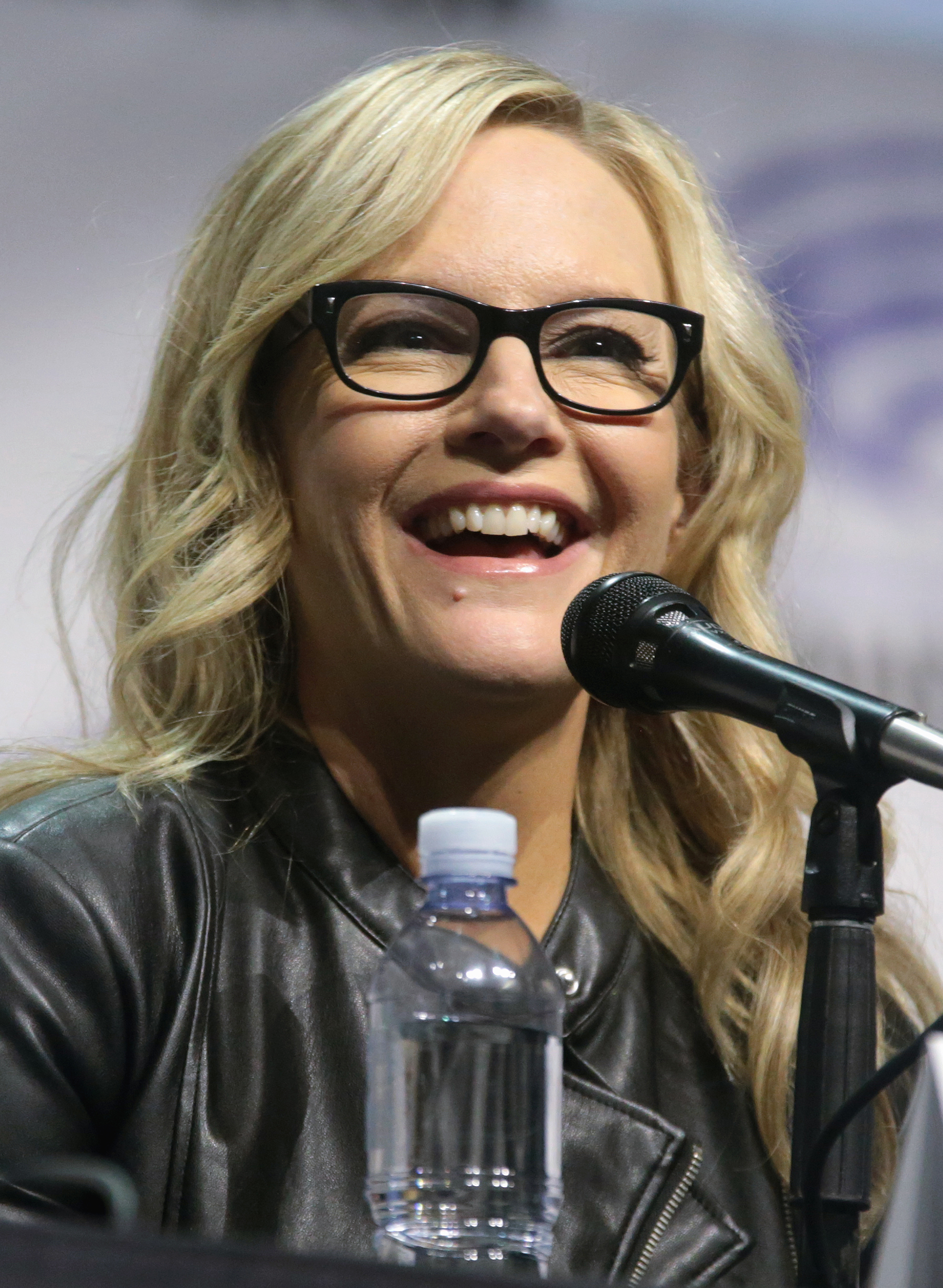
Rachael Harris

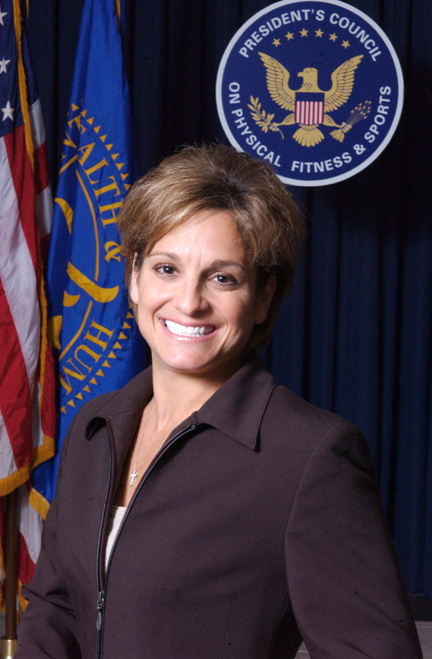
Mary Lou Retton

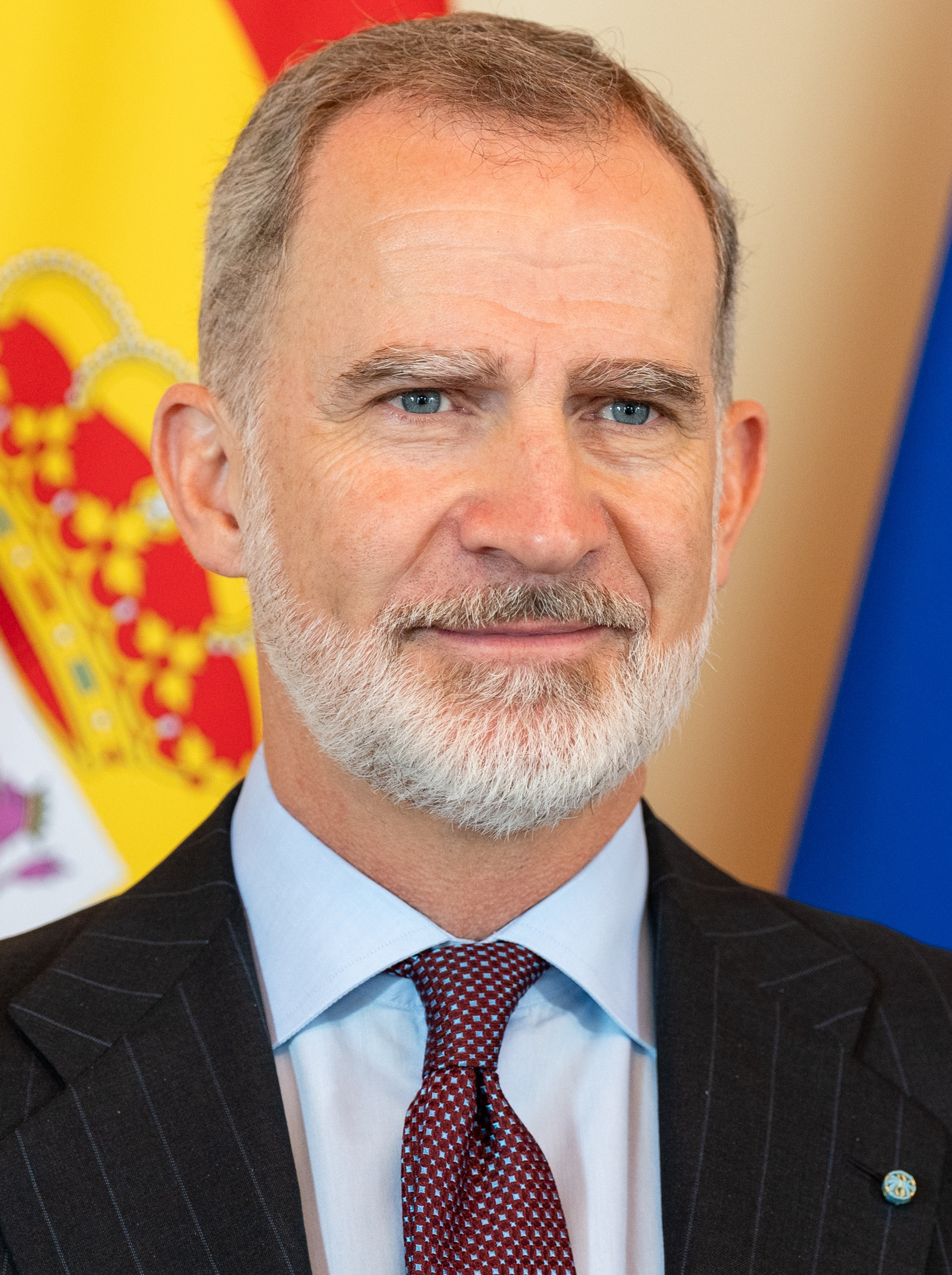
Felipe VI

- January 1 – Davor Šuker, Croatian footballer
- January 2
  - Oleg Deripaska, Russian businessman
  - Cuba Gooding Jr., American actor
  - Anky van Grunsven, Dutch equestrian
- January 5
  - DJ BoBo, Swiss singer-songwriter and dancer
  - Andrzej Gołota, Polish boxer
  - Carrie Ann Inaba, American choreographer, game show host and singer
- January 6 – John Singleton, African-American film director and writer (d. 2019)
- January 9 – Silver King, Mexican luchador (d. 2019)
- January 11 – Benjamin List, German organic chemist, recipient of Nobel Prize in Chemistry
- January 12
  - Rachael Harris, American actress and comedian
- January 13 – Pat Onstad, Canadian soccer player
- January 14 – LL Cool J, African-American rapper and actor
- January 16 – Atticus Ross, English musician, songwriter, record producer and audio engineer
- January 17 – Svetlana Masterkova, Russian athlete
- January 18 – David Ayer, American filmmaker
- January 24
  - Michael Kiske, German musician
  - Mary Lou Retton, American gymnast
- January 26 – Novala Takemoto, Japanese author and fashion designer
- January 27 – Mike Patton, American singer
- January 28 – Sarah McLachlan, Canadian singer
- January 29 – Edward Burns, American actor
- January 30 – King Felipe VI of Spain

=== February ===
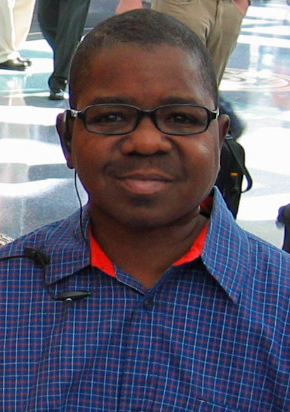
Gary Coleman

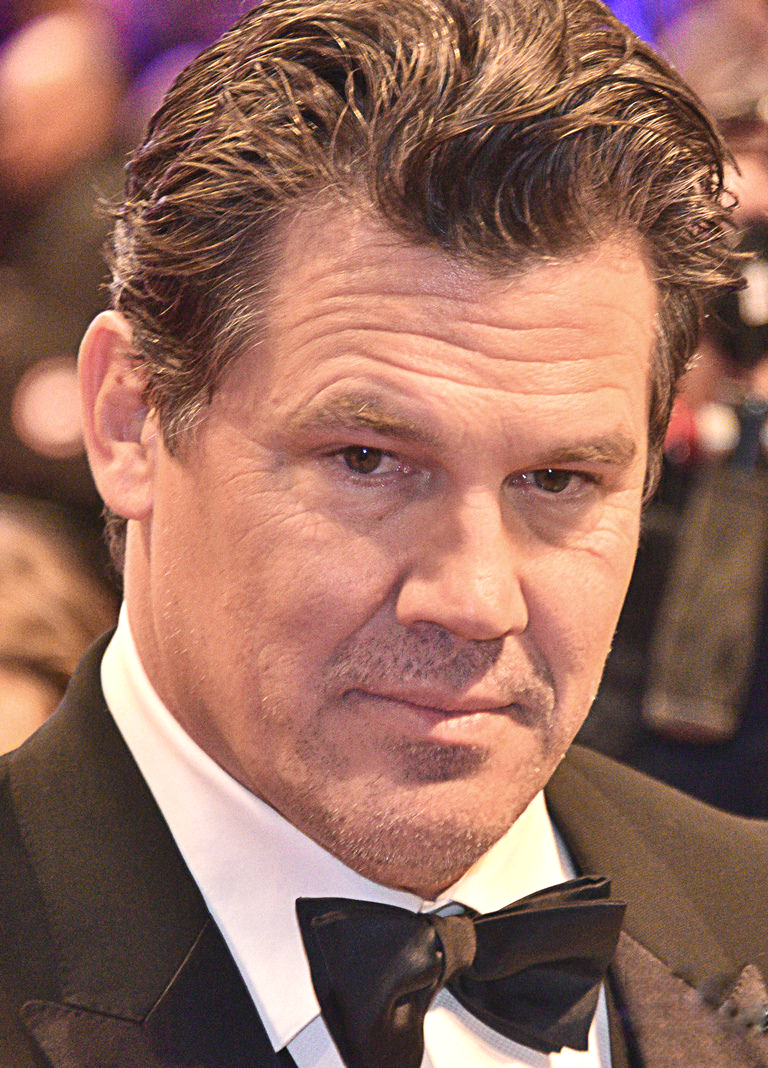
Josh Brolin

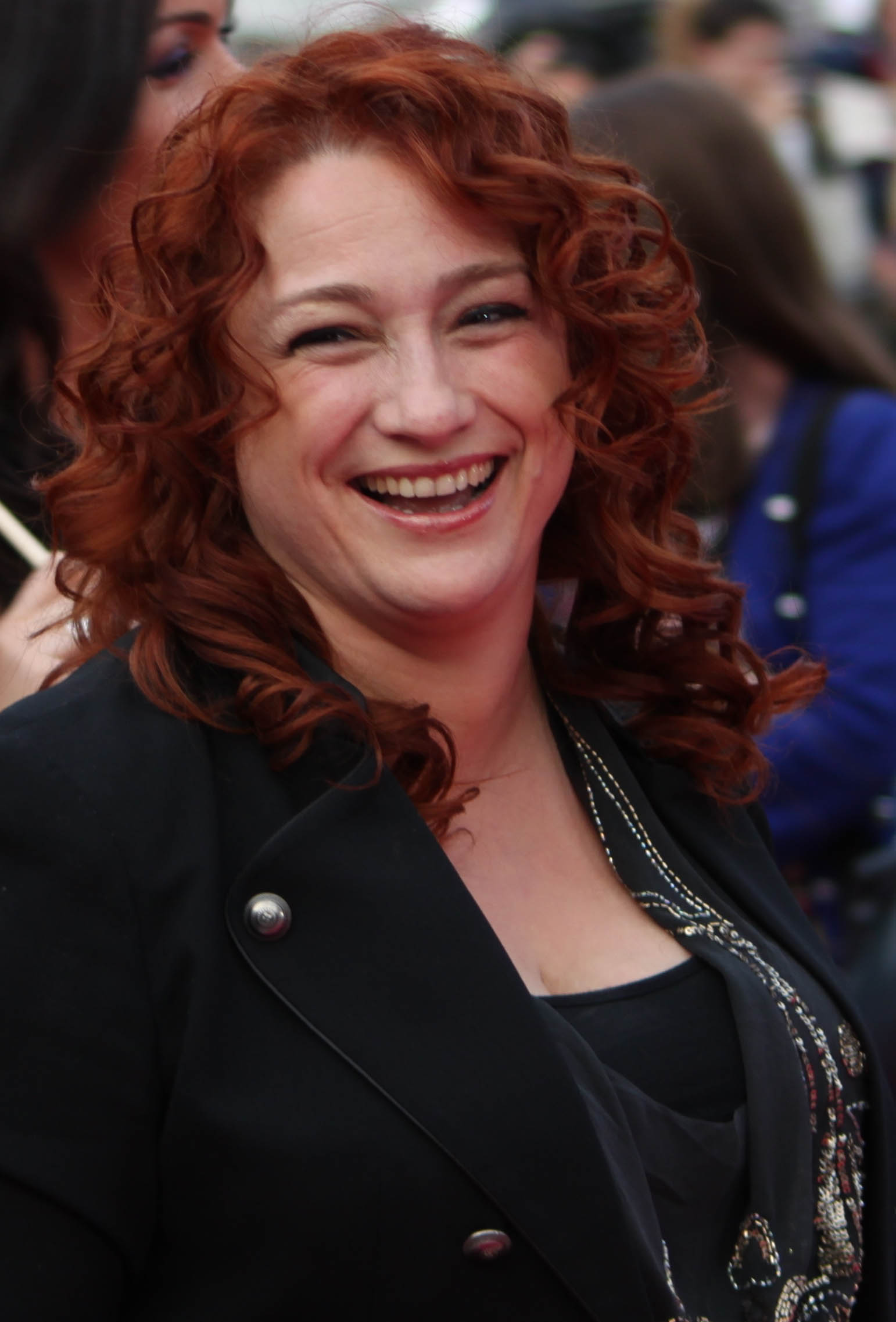
Niamh Kavanagh

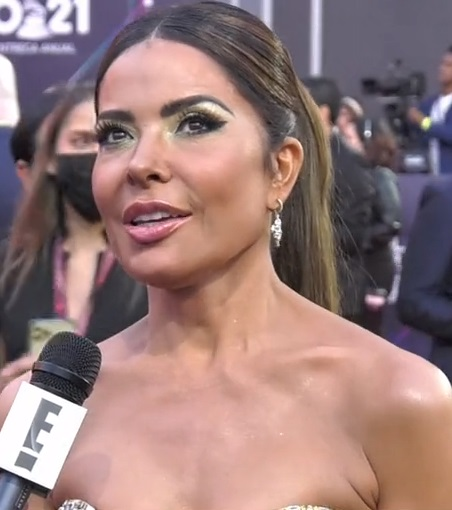
Gloria Trevi

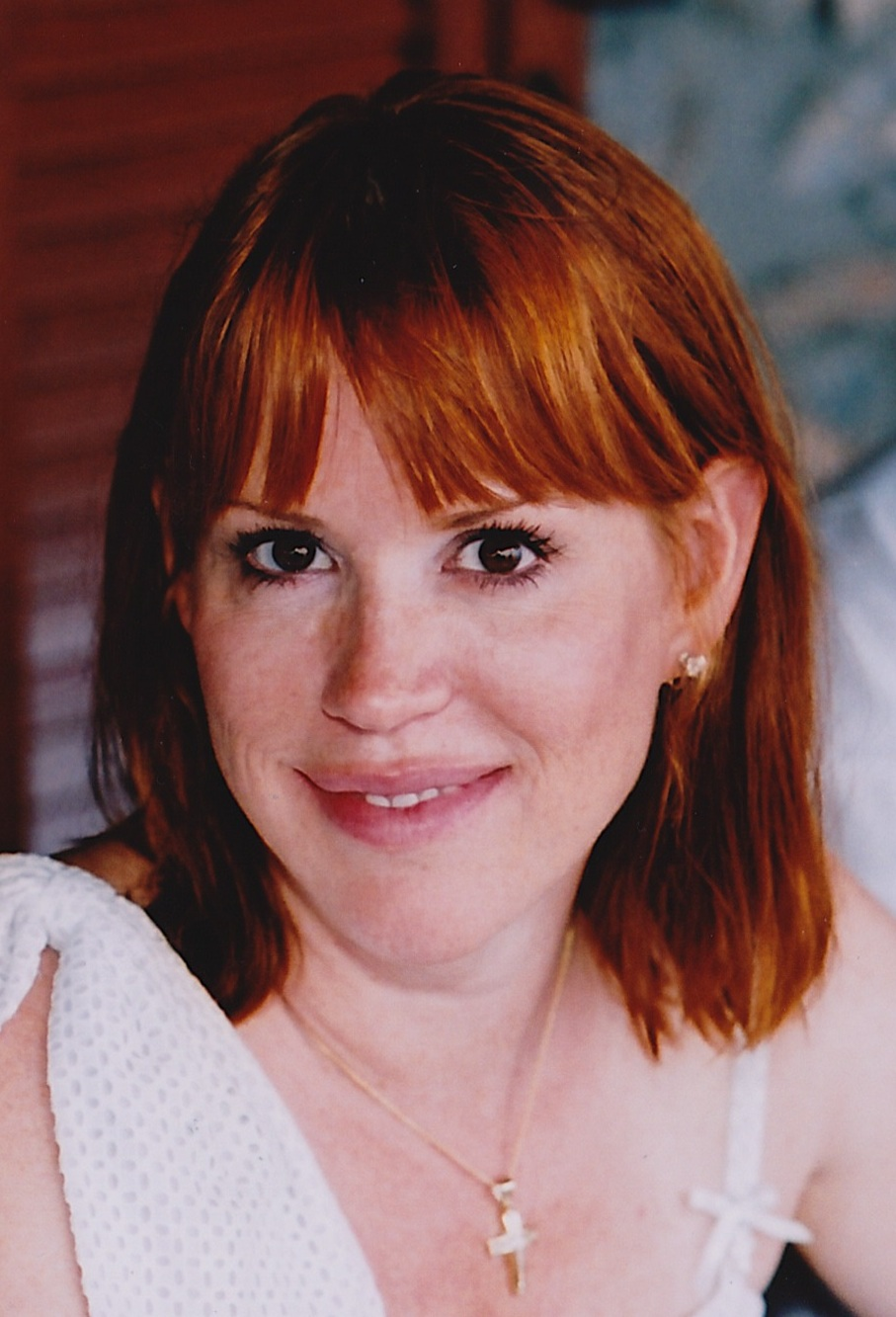
Molly Ringwald

- February 1
  - Lisa Marie Presley, American singer-songwriter, daughter of Elvis Presley (d. 2023)
  - Mark Recchi, Canadian ice hockey player
- February 3 – Vlade Divac, Serbian basketball player
- February 5 – Marcus Grönholm, Finnish rally driver
- February 7
  - Peter Bondra, Slovak ice hockey player
  - Porntip Nakhirunkanok, Miss Universe 1988
- February 8 – Gary Coleman, African-American actor (d. 2010)
- February 11 – Lavinia Agache, Romanian artistic gymnast
- February 12 – Josh Brolin, American actor
- February 13
  - Kelly Hu, American actress and voice artist, previously fashion model and beauty queen
  - Niamh Kavanagh, Irish singer, Eurovision Song Contest 1993 winner
- February 15 – Gloria Trevi, Mexican singer and actress
- February 18
  - Molly Ringwald, American actress
  - Dennis Satin, German film director
- February 21 – Pellom McDaniels, American football player (d. 2020)
- February 22
  - Bradley Nowell, American musician (d. 1996)
  - Jeri Ryan, American actress
- February 23 – Jagath Wickramaratne, Sri Lankan politician and 23rd Speaker of the Parliament
- February 24
  - Mitch Hedberg, American stand-up comedian (d. 2005)
- February 29 – Sam Sneed, American producer and rapper

=== March ===
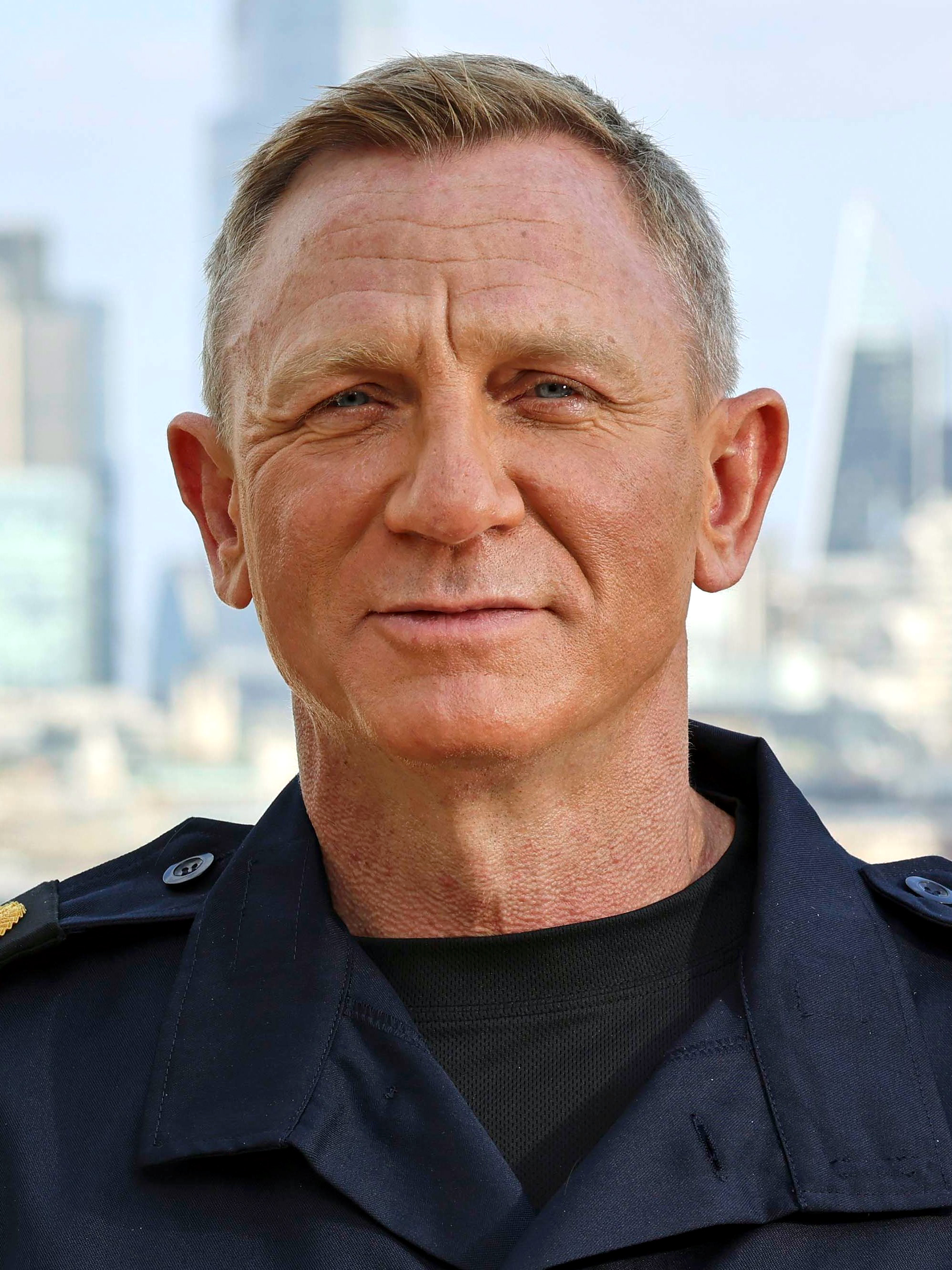
Daniel Craig

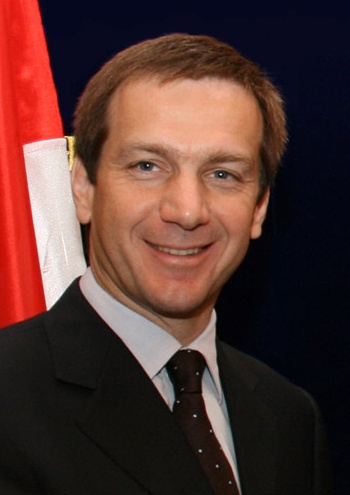
Gordon Bajnai

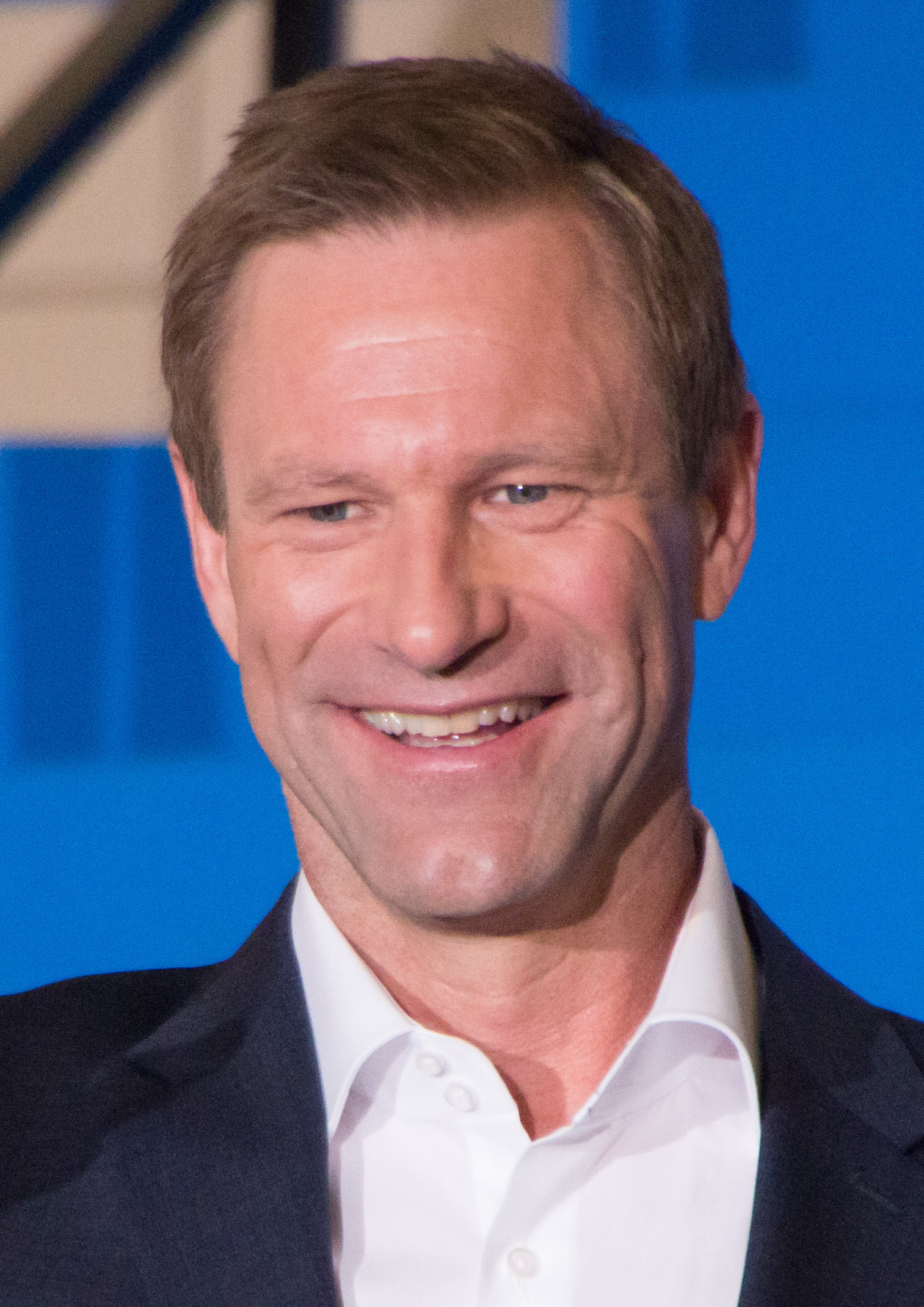
Aaron Eckhart

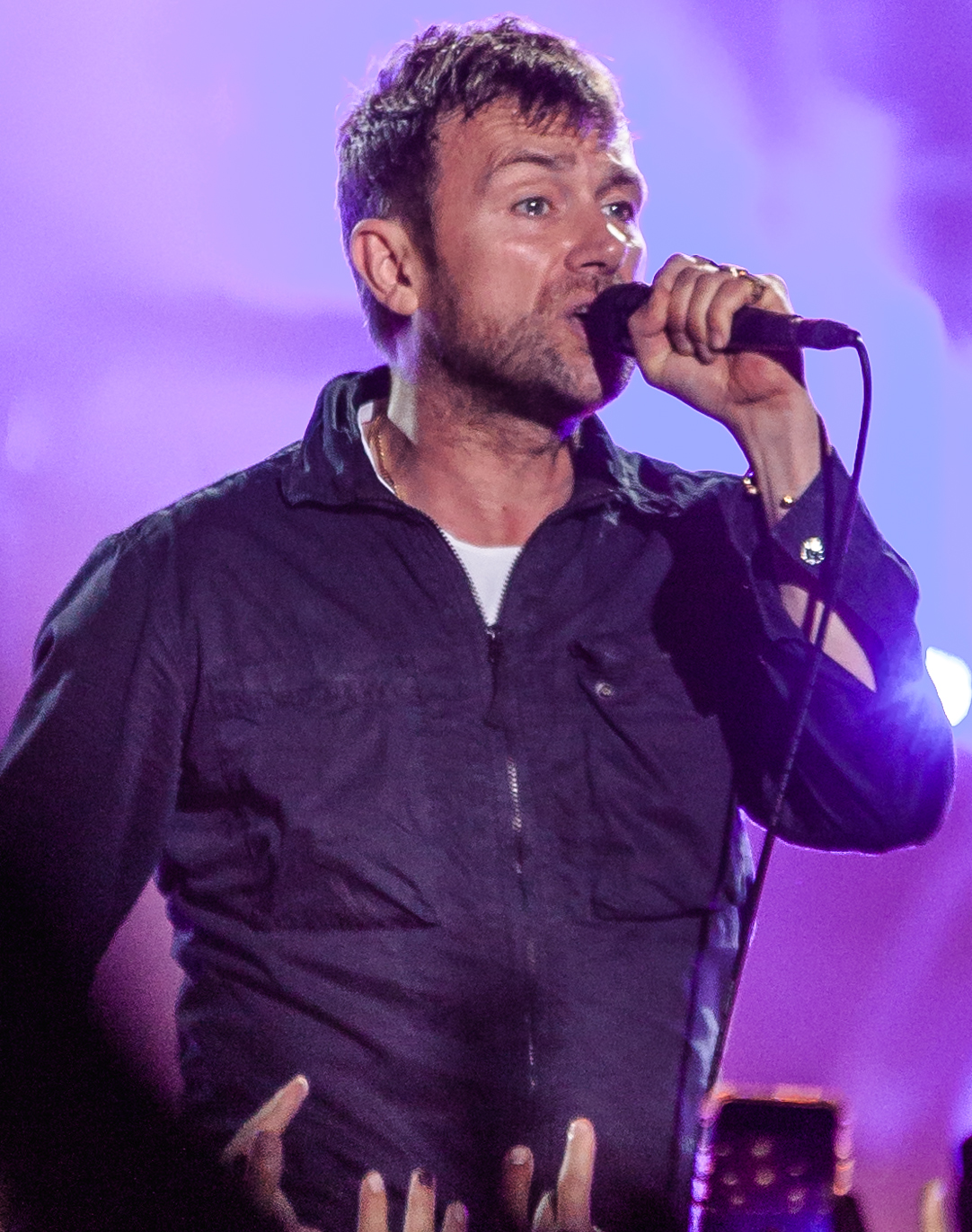
Damon Albarn

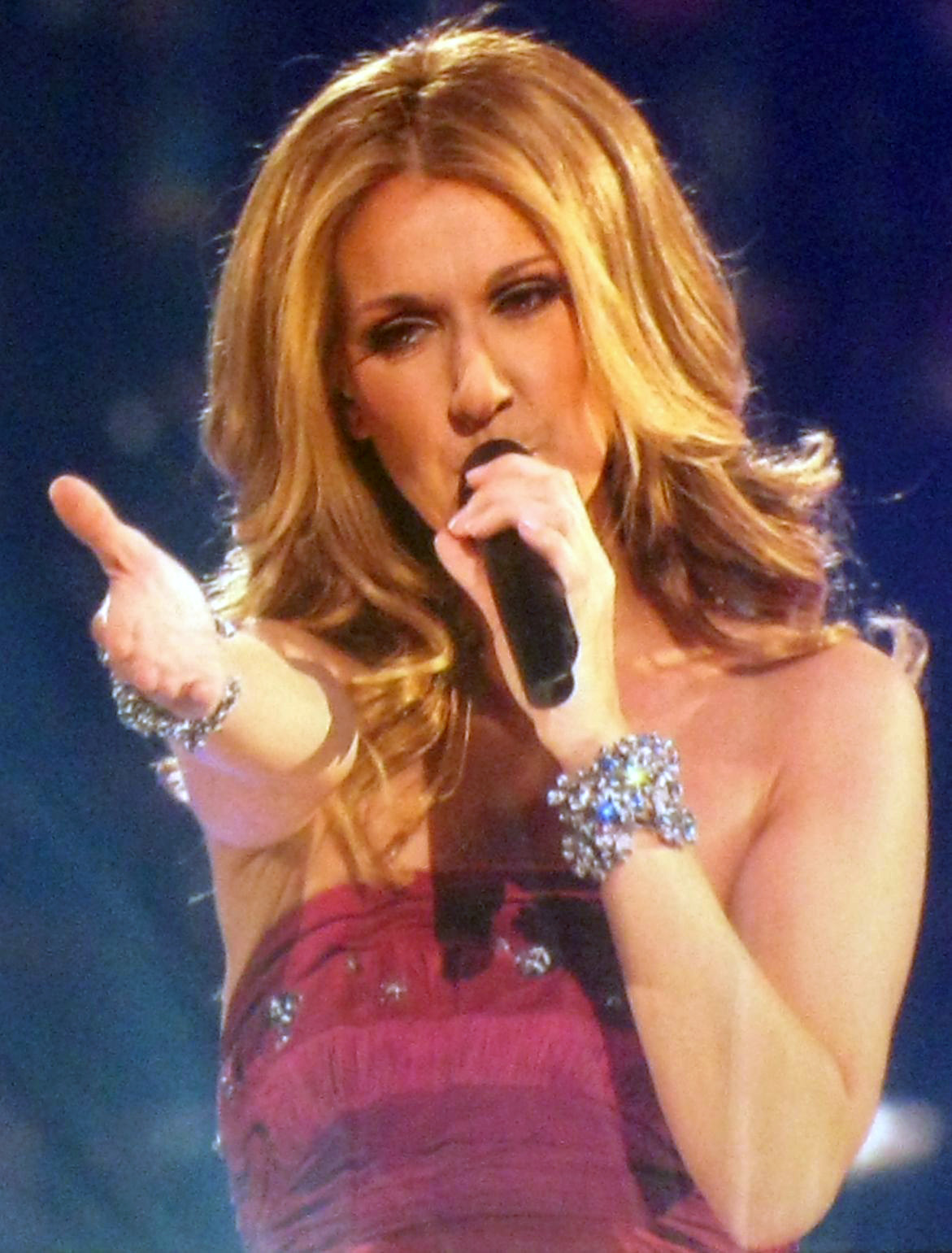
Celine Dion

- March 1
  - Kat Cressida, American voice actress
  - Kunjarani Devi, Indian weightlifter
  - Muho Noelke, German Zen master
- March 2 – Daniel Craig, British actor
- March 3 – Brian Leetch, American ice hockey player
- March 4
  - Giovanni Carrara, Venezuelan Major League Baseball player
  - Patsy Kensit, British actress
  - Kyriakos Mitsotakis, Greek politician, Prime Minister of Greece (2019–present)
- March 5
  - Gordon Bajnai, Hungarian Prime Minister
  - Ambrose Mandvulo Dlamini, 10th Prime Minister of Eswatini (d. 2020)
- March 6 – Moira Kelly, American actress
- March 7 – Jeff Kent, American baseball player
- March 9
  - Youri Djorkaeff, French footballer
  - Rexy Mainaky, Indonesian badminton player
- March 11 – Lisa Loeb, American singer
- March 12
  - Aaron Eckhart, American actor
  - Tammy Duckworth, US Senator
- March 13
  - Gillian Keegan, British politician
  - Masami Okui, Japanese singer
- March 14
  - Megan Follows, Canadian-American actress
  - James Frain, British actor
- March 15
  - Mark McGrath, American singer
  - Terje Riis-Johansen, Norwegian politician
  - Sabrina Salerno, Italian singer
- March 16
  - David MacMillan, Scottish-born organic chemist, recipient of Nobel Prize in Chemistry
  - Trevor Wilson, American basketball player
- March 20
  - Carlos Almeida, Cape Verdean long-distance runner
  - Ultra Naté, American singer-songwriter, record producer, DJ and promoter
- March 22 – Euronymous, Norwegian musician (d. 1993)
- March 23
  - Damon Albarn, English singer-songwriter and musician
  - Mike Atherton, English cricketer
  - Fernando Hierro, Spanish football player and coach
- March 26
  - Kenny Chesney, American country music singer
  - James Iha, American rock musician
- March 27 – Ben Koldyke, American actor
- March 28 – Iris Chang, American author (d. 2004)
- March 29 – Lucy Lawless, New Zealand actress and singer
- March 30 – Celine Dion, Canadian singer
- March 31 – César Sampaio, Brazilian football player and coach

=== April ===
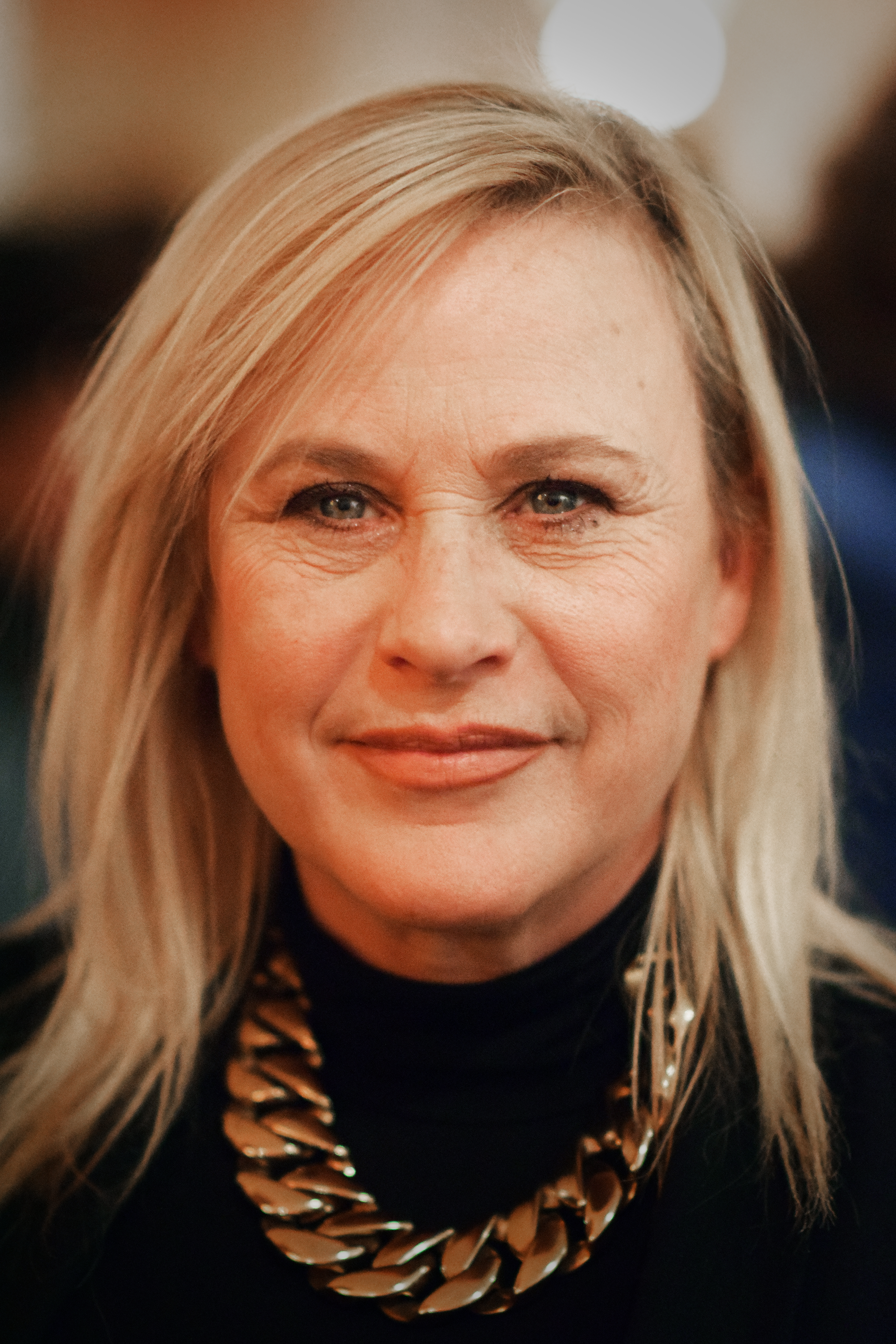
Patricia Arquette

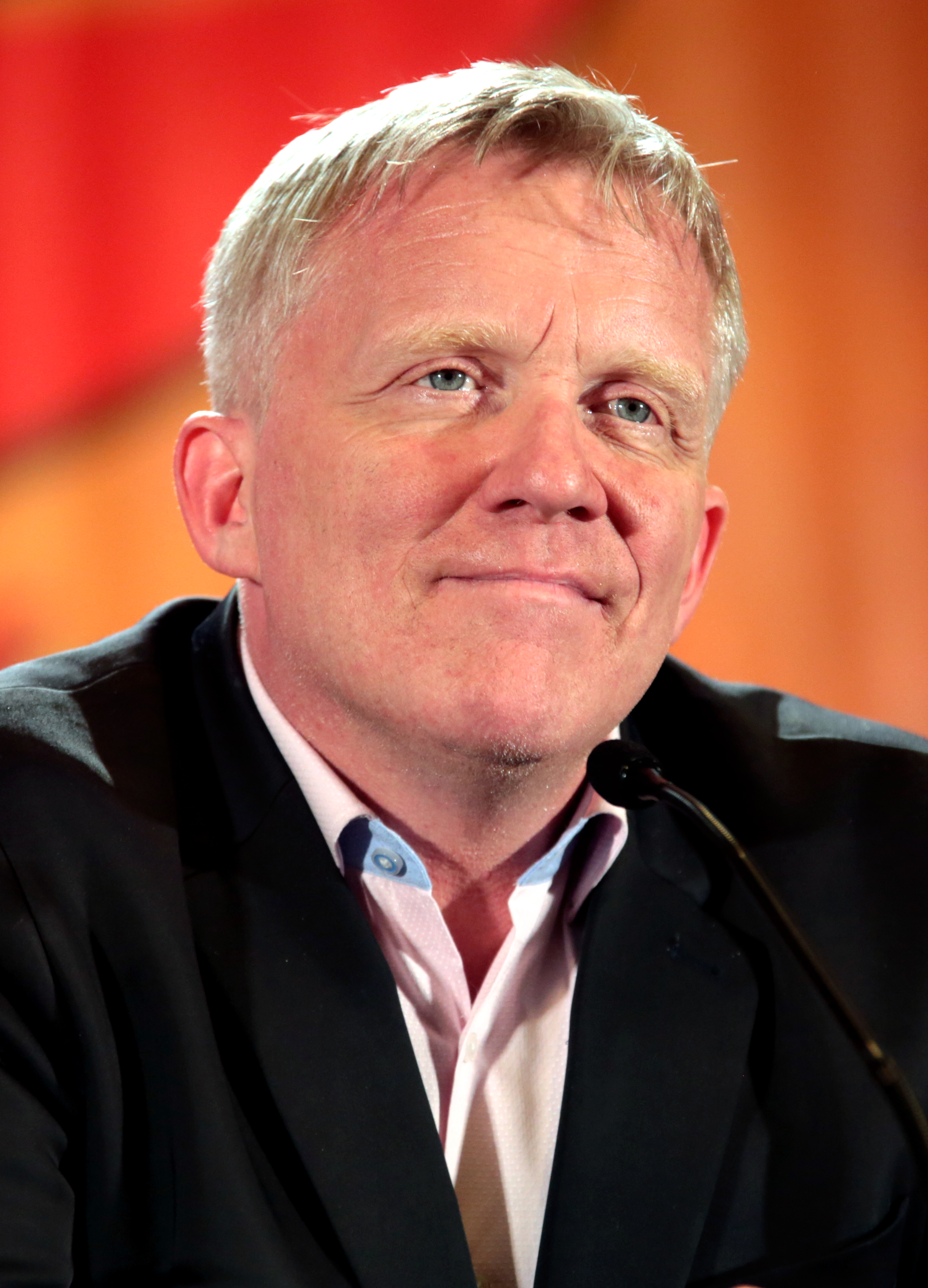
Anthony Michael Hall

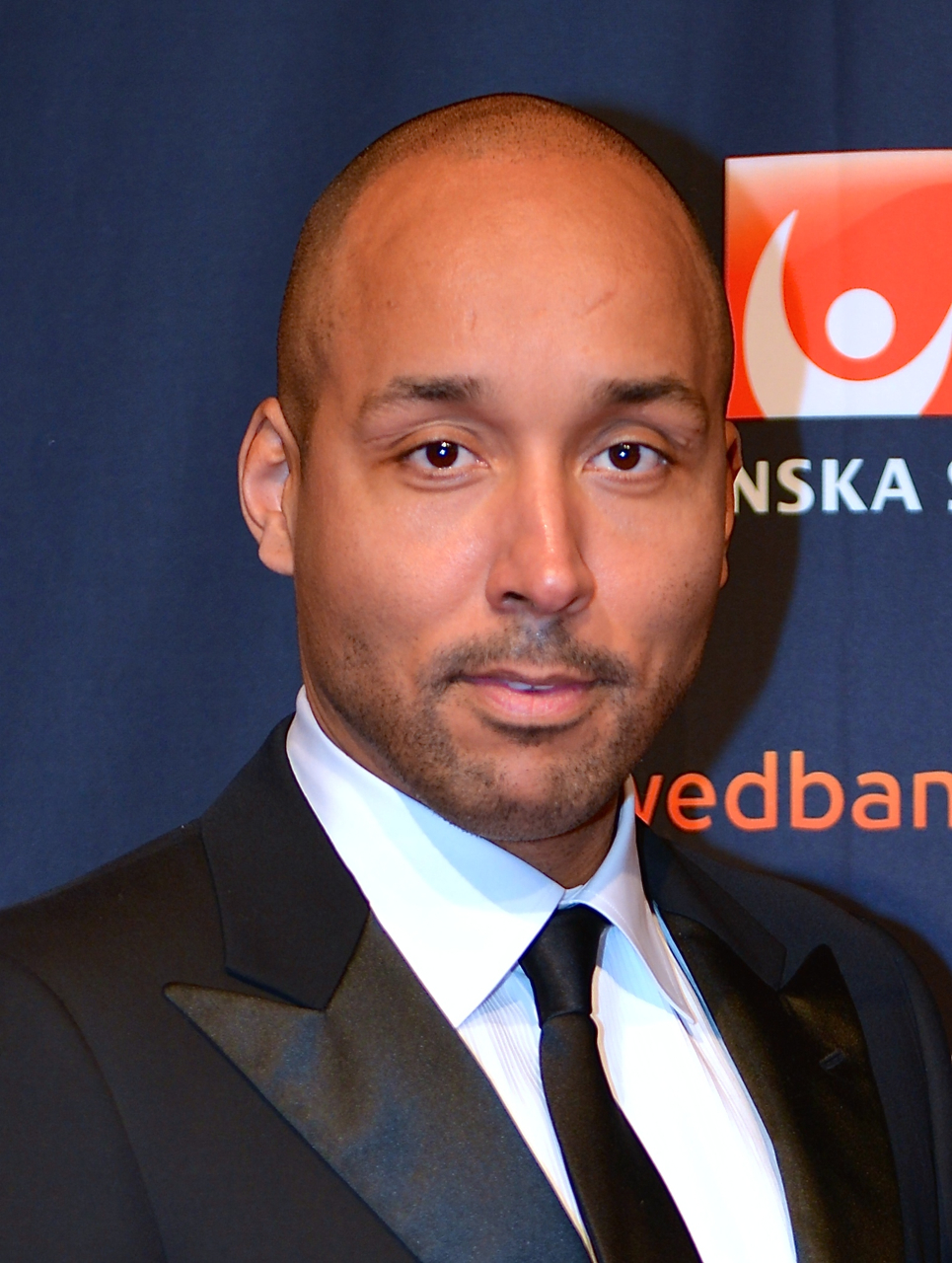

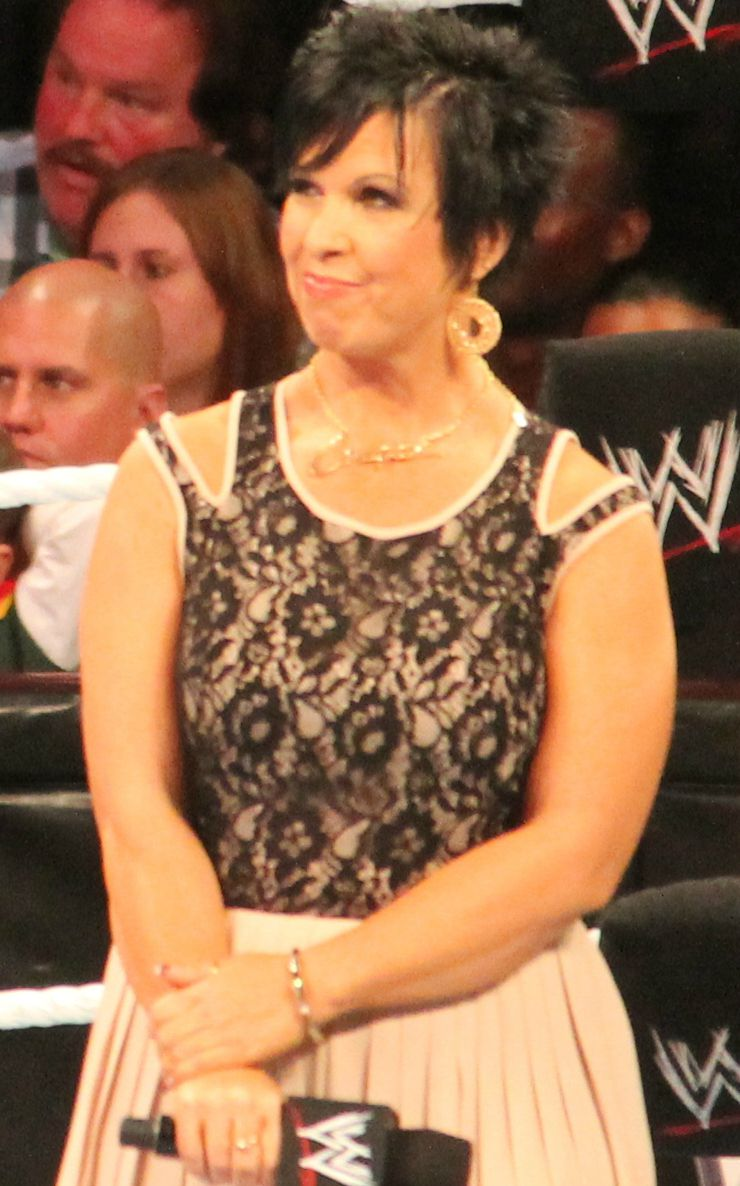
Vickie Guerrero

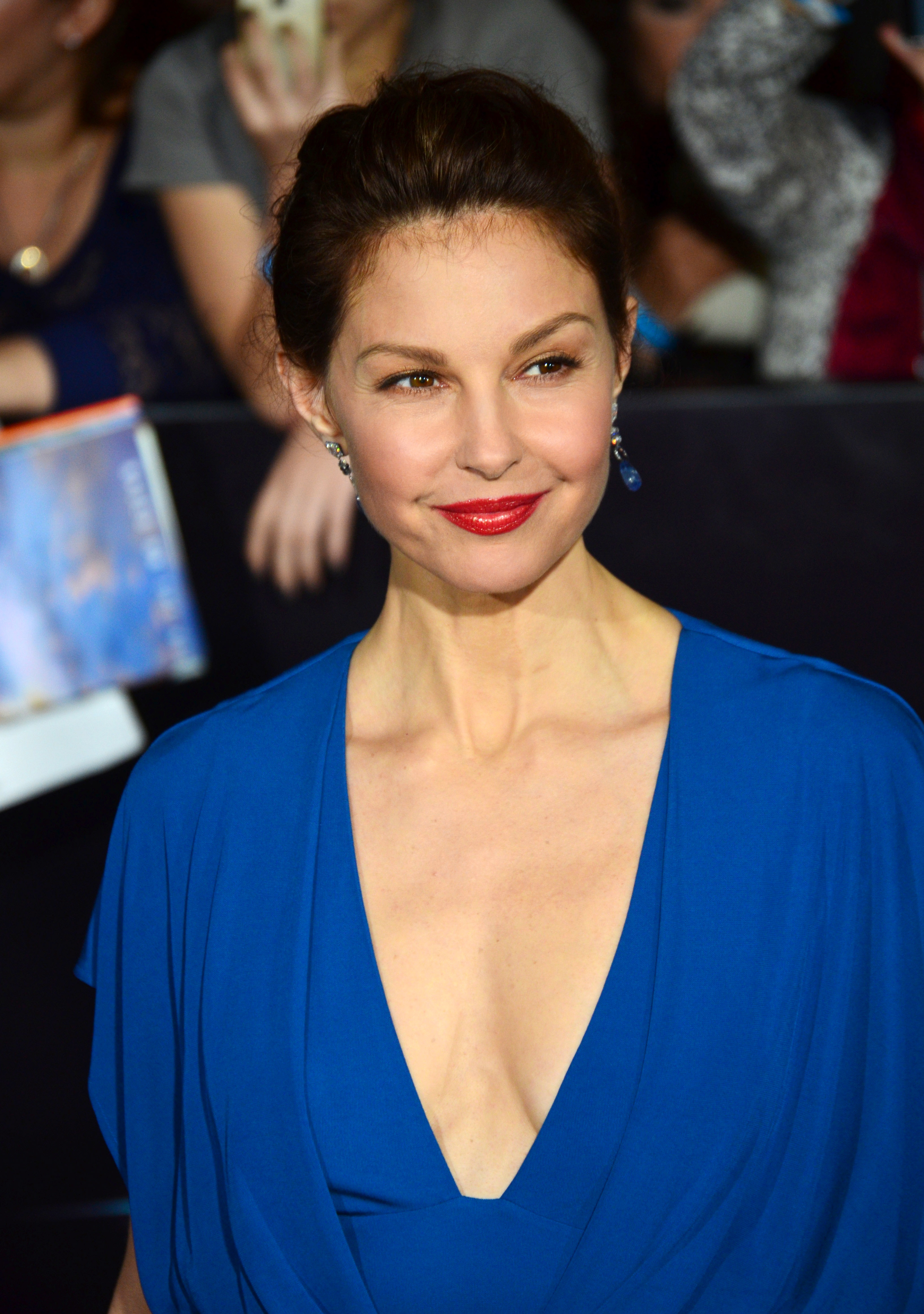
Ashley Judd

- April 1
  - Julia Boutros, Lebanese singer
  - Alexander Stubb, 43rd Prime Minister of Finland
- April 5
  - Paula Cole, American singer
  - Stewart Lee, English stand-up comedian
- April 7 – Jože Možina, Slovenian historian, sociologist and journalist
- April 8
  - Patricia Arquette, American actress
  - Shawn Fonteno, American actor and rapper
- April 9 – Tom Brands, American Olympic wrestler
- April 12 – Neil Brady, Canadian ice hockey player
- April 13 – Necrobutcher, Norwegian musician
- April 14 – Anthony Michael Hall, American actor and singer
- April 15 – Stacey Williams, American model
- April 16
  - Martin Dahlin, Swedish football player
  - Vickie Guerrero, American professional wrestler
- April 17
  - Julie Fagerholt, Danish fashion designer
  - Adam McKay, American film director, producer, screenwriter, comedian and actor
- April 18 – David Hewlett, English-born Canadian actor, writer and director
- April 19 – Ashley Judd, American actress
- April 20 – Yelena Välbe, Russian cross-country skier
- April 22 – Zarley Zalapski, Canadian ice hockey player (d. 2017)
- April 23 – Timothy McVeigh, American terrorist (d. 2001)
- April 24
  - Stacy Haiduk, American actress
  - Jorge Medina, Bolivian civil rights activist and politician (d. 2022)
  - Yuji Nagata, Japanese professional wrestler
- April 28 – Howard Donald, British singer (Take That)
- April 29
  - Kolinda Grabar-Kitarović, President of Croatia (2015–2020)
  - Michael Herbig, German film director, actor and author

=== May ===
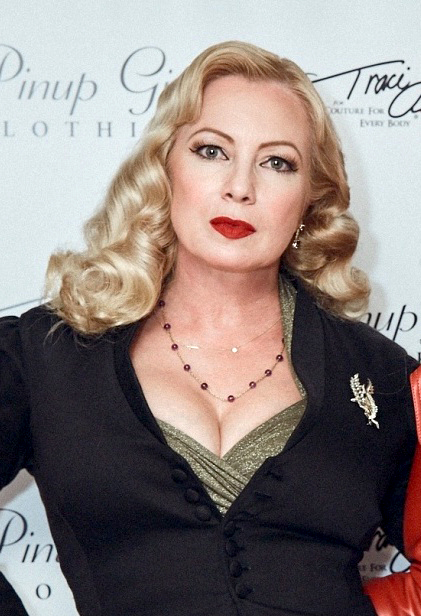
Traci Lords

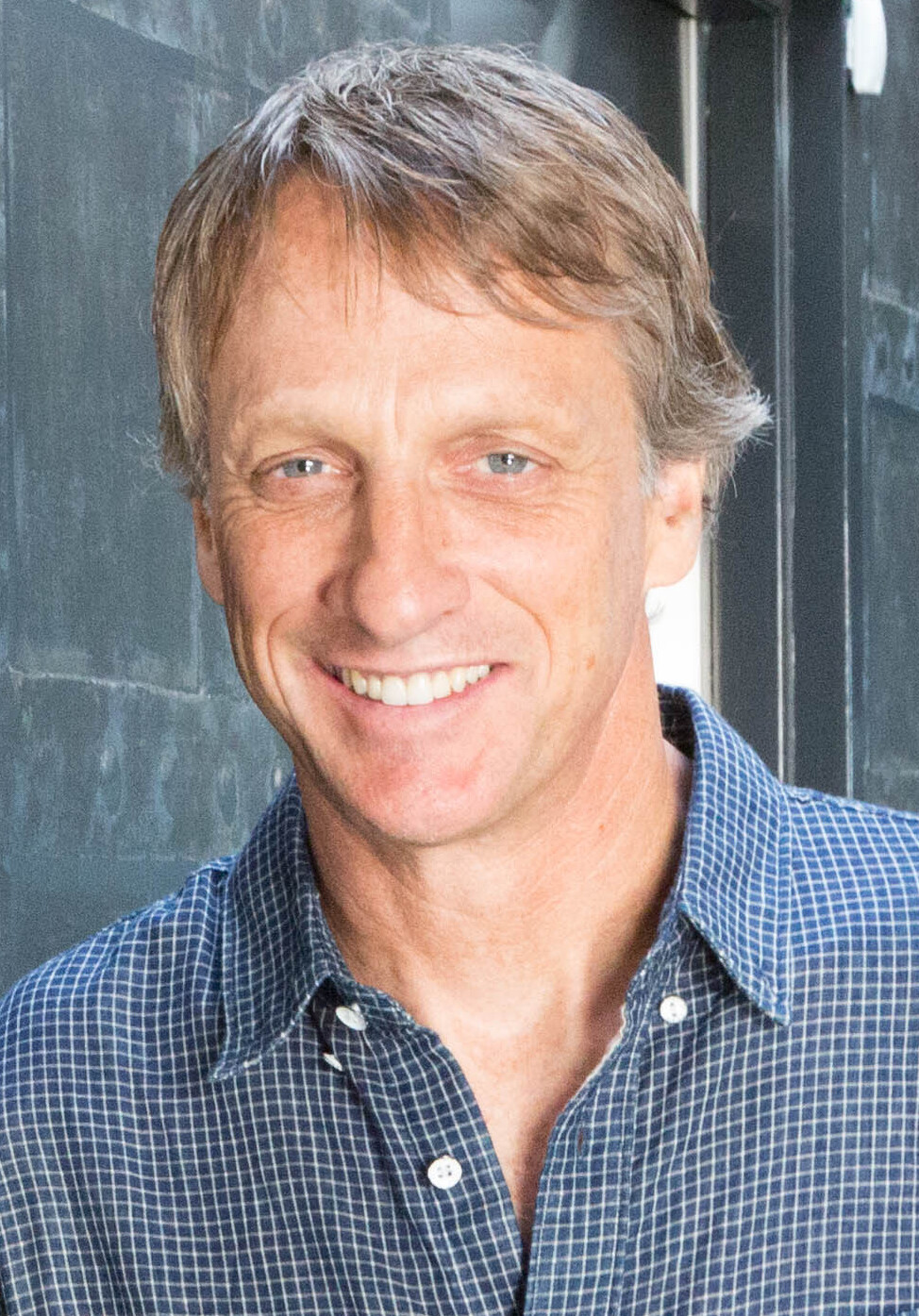
Tony Hawk

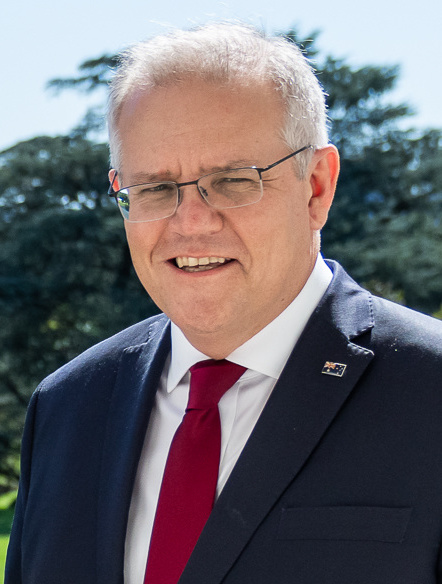
Scott Morrison

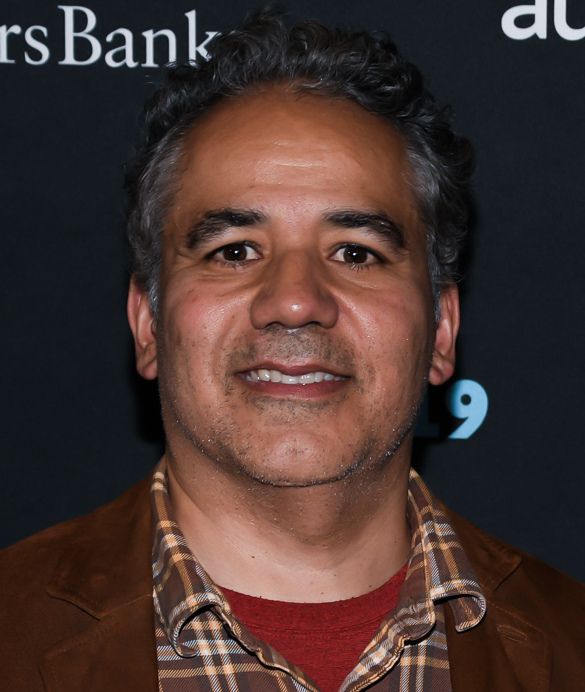
John Ortiz

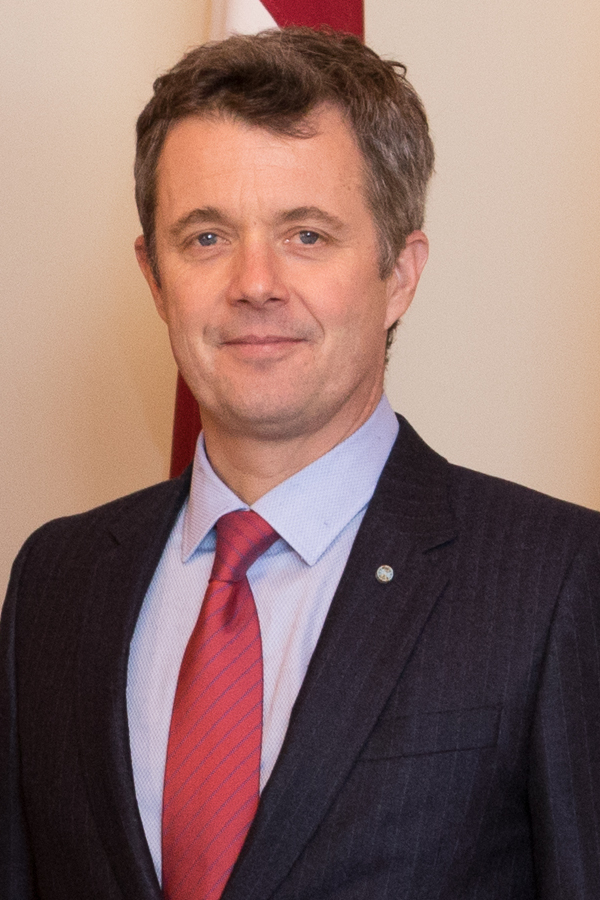
King Frederik X of Denmark

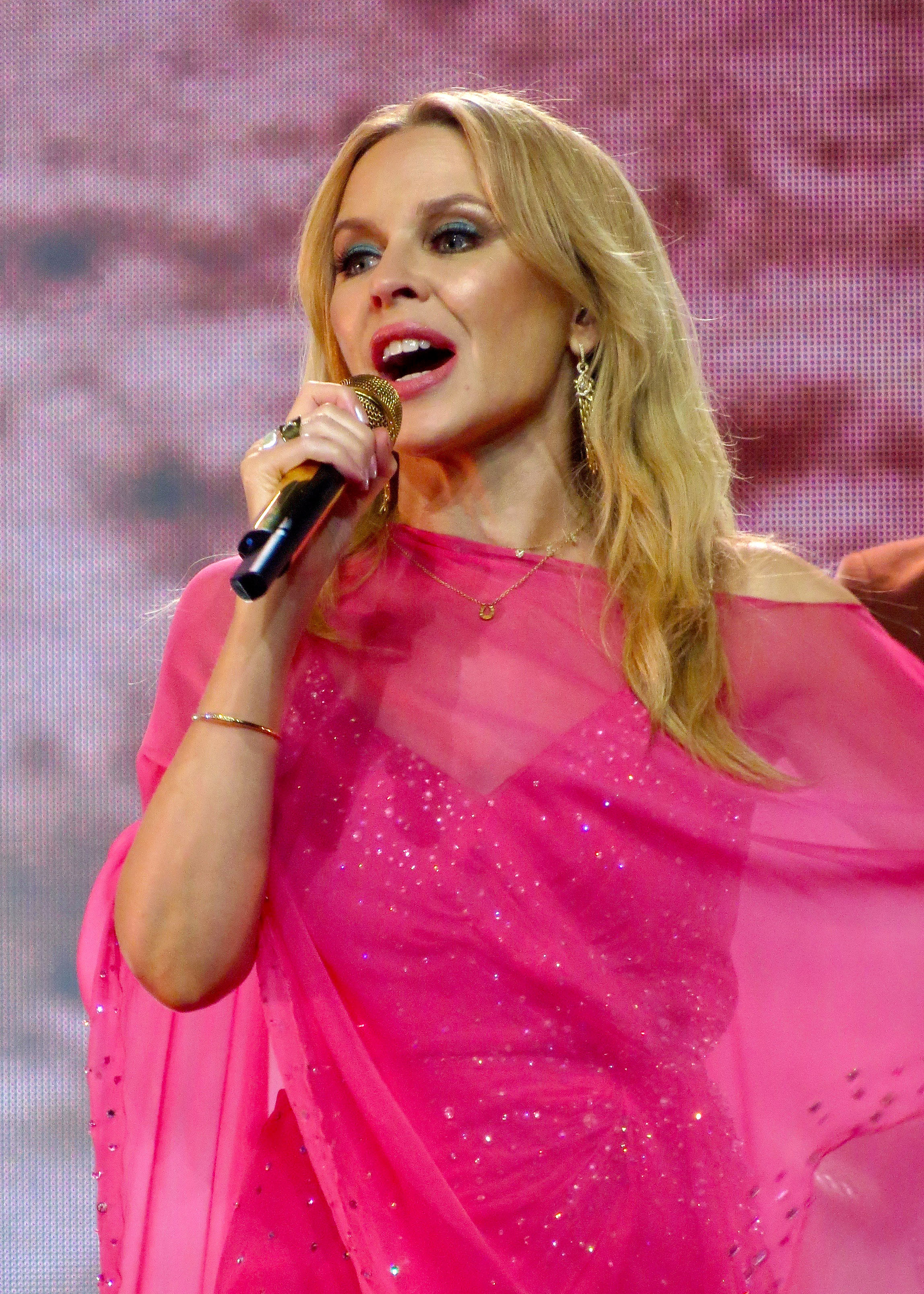
Kylie Minogue

- May 1 – Oliver Bierhoff, German footballer
- May 2
  - Jeff Agoos, American soccer player
  - Hikaru Midorikawa, Japanese voice actor
- May 3
  - Nina Paley, American cartoonist
  - Li Yong, Chinese host (d. 2018)
  - Amy Ryan, American actress
- May 4 – Momoko Kikuchi, Japanese actress and singer
- May 5 – John Soko, Zambian footballer (d. 1993)
- May 7
  - Eagle-Eye Cherry, Swedish-born musician
  - Traci Lords, American actress
- May 8
  - Mickaël Madar, French footballer
  - Éric Martineau, French politician
- May 9
  - Carla Overbeck, American soccer player
  - Marie-José Pérec, French athlete
  - Nataša Pirc Musar, Slovenian politician, attorney, author, journalist and 5th President of Slovenia
- May 10 – Al Murray, English comedian
- May 12 – Tony Hawk, American skateboarder
- May 13
  - Sonja Zietlow, German television presenter
  - Scott Morrison, 30th Prime Minister of Australia
- May 16 – Chingmy Yau, Hong Kong actress
- May 17 – Constance Menard, French professional dressage rider
- May 19 – Kyle Eastwood, American jazz bass musician
- May 20
  - Timothy Olyphant, American actor
  - Waisale Serevi, Fijian rugby player
- May 22
  - Michael Kelly, American actor
  - Graham Linehan, Irish television writer and director
- May 23 – John Ortiz, American actor
- May 24 – Charles De'Ath, English actor
- May 26 – King Frederik X of Denmark
- May 28 – Kylie Minogue, Australian actress and singer
- May 30 – Zacarias Moussaoui, French-Moroccan 9/11 conspirator

=== June ===
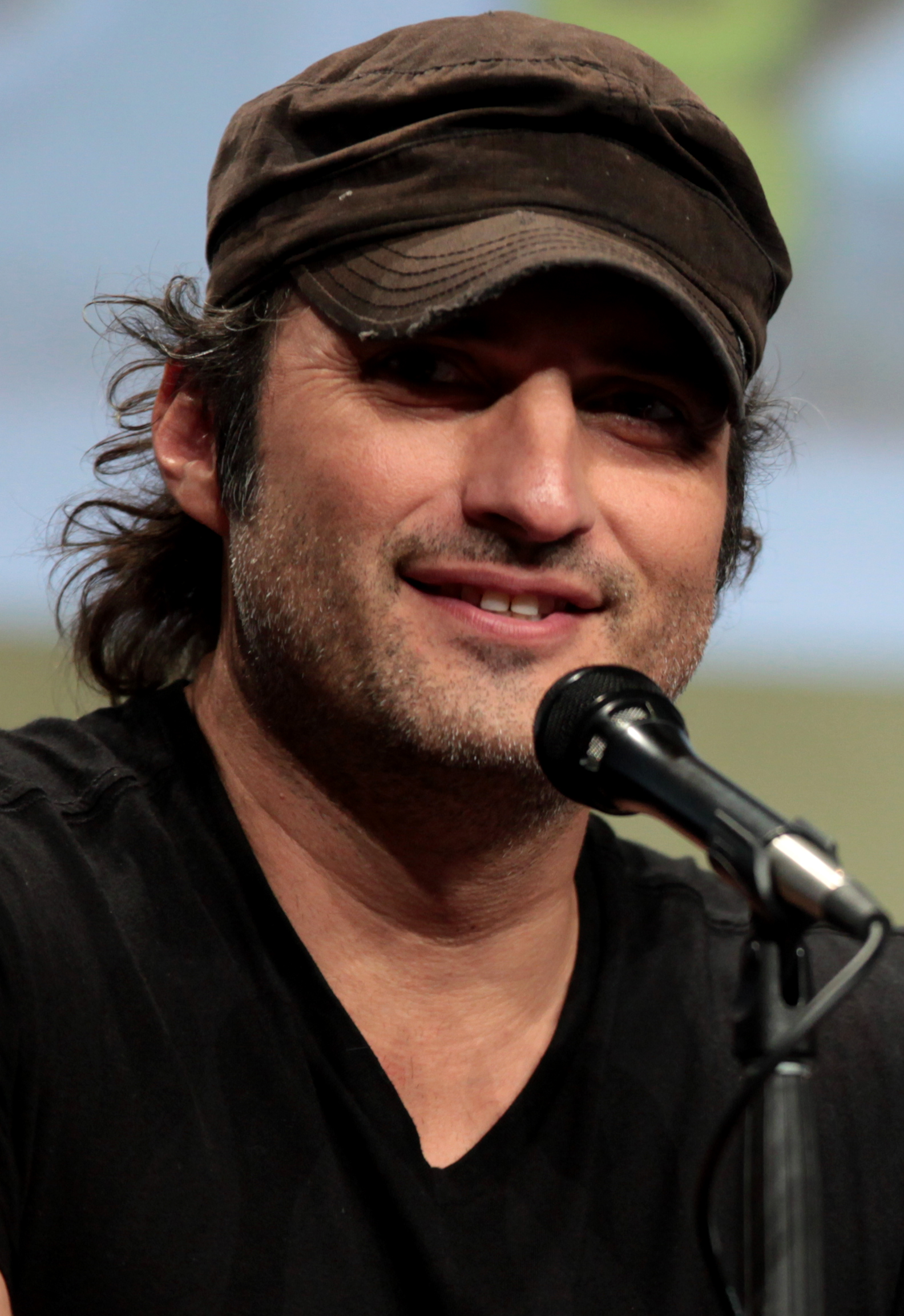
Robert Rodriguez

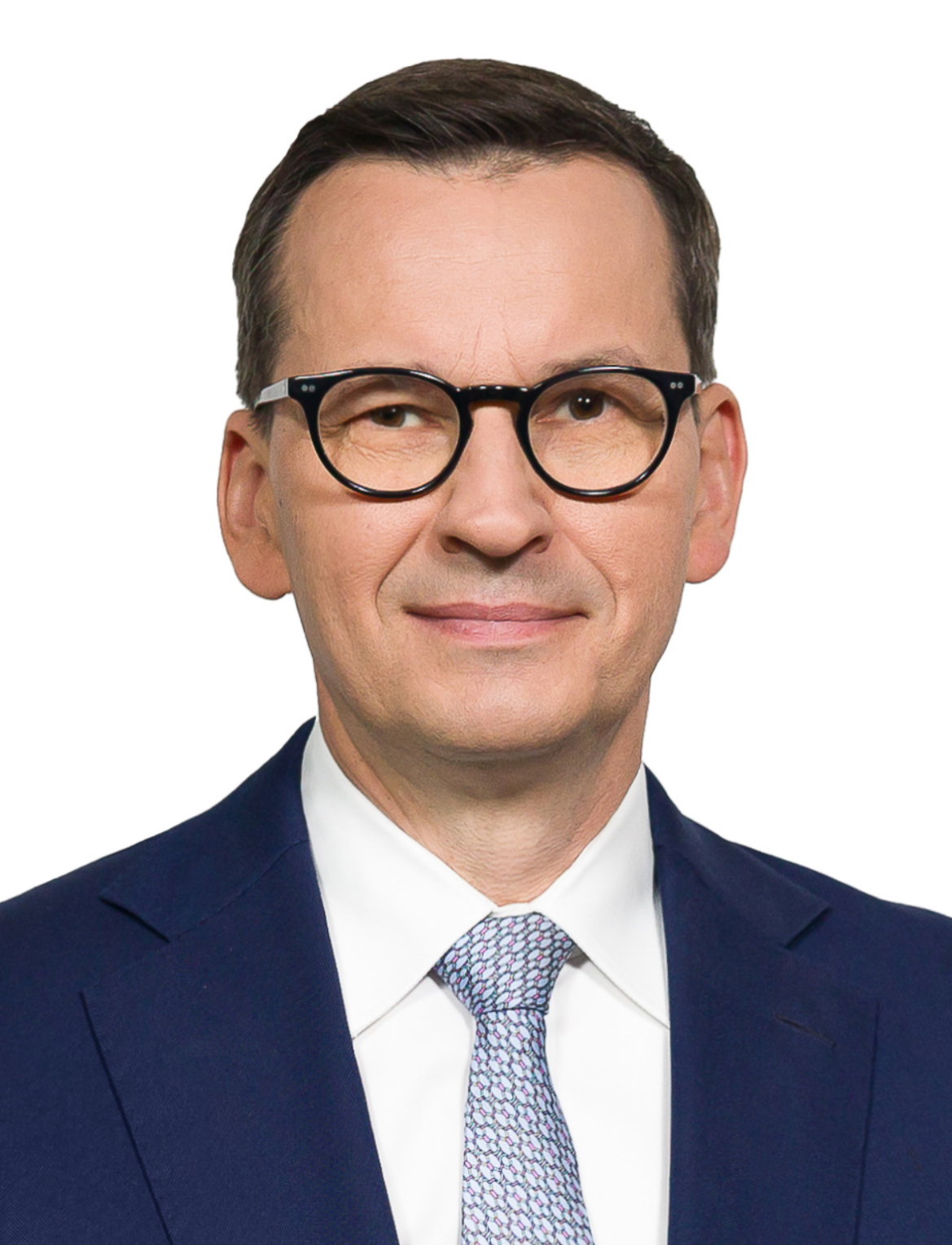
Mateusz Morawiecki

Jovenel Moïse

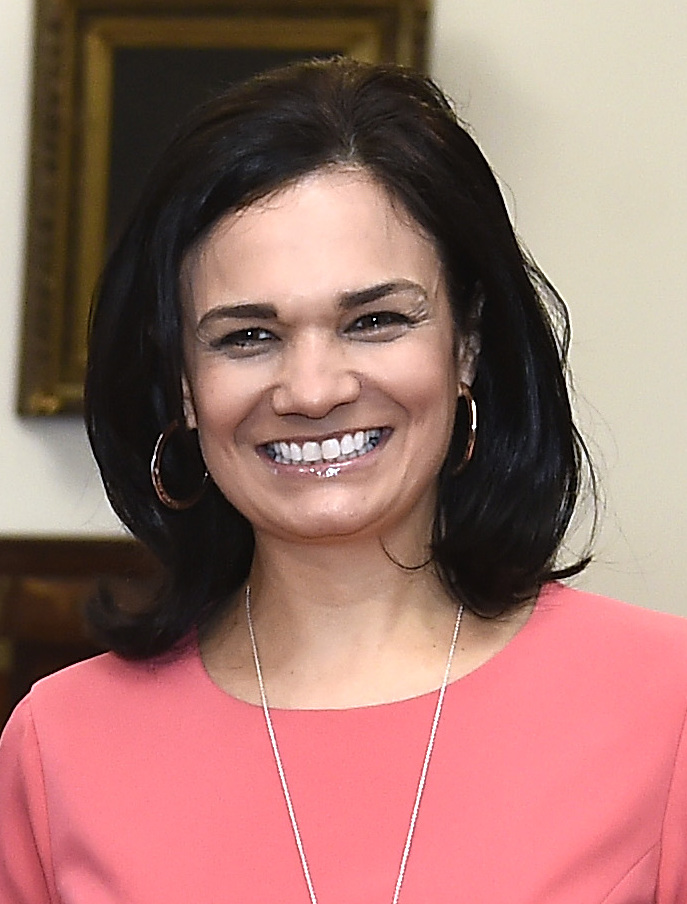
Isabel Saint Malo

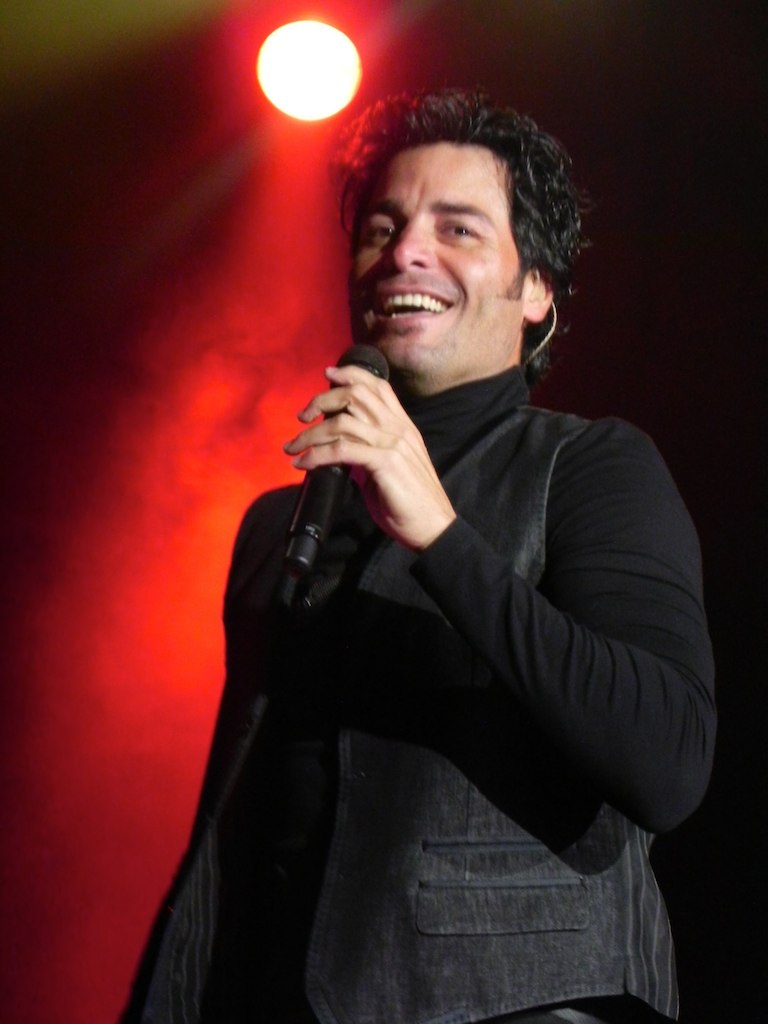
Chayanne

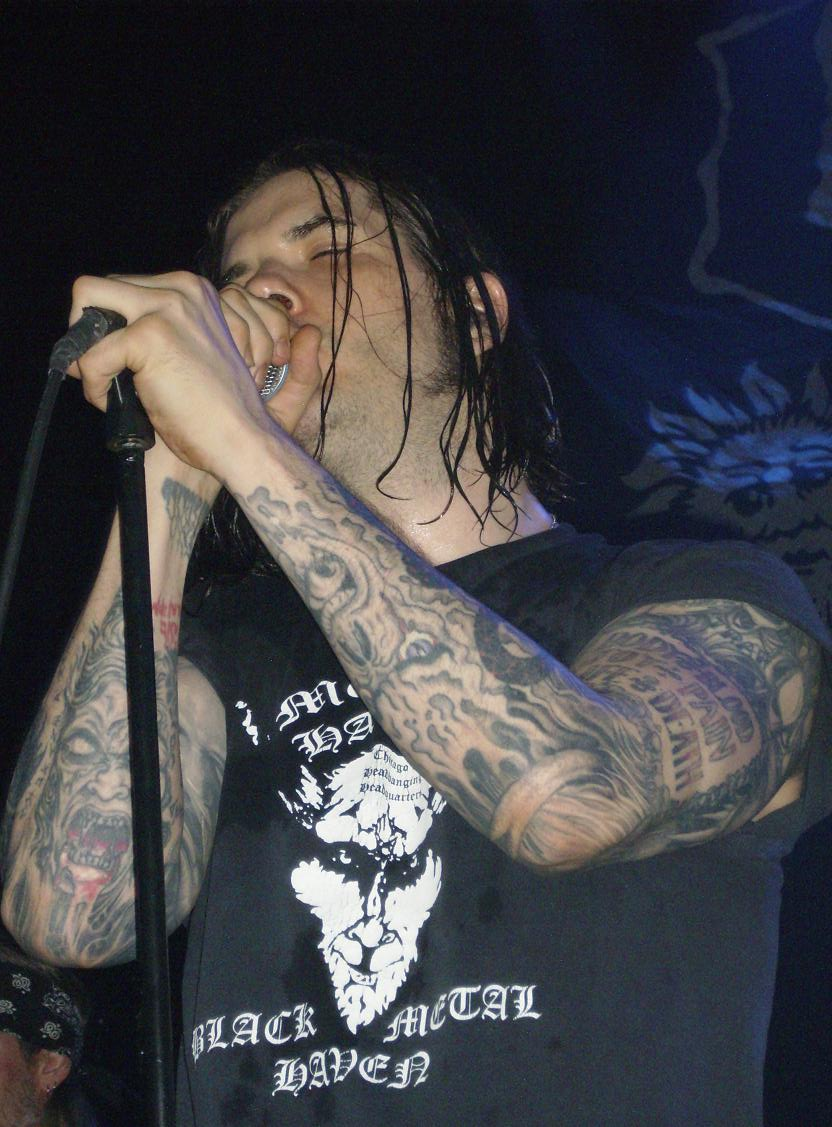
Phil Anselmo

- June 1 – Jason Donovan, Australian actor and singer
- June 2
  - Beetlejuice, American entertainer, member of the Wack Pack (The Howard Stern Show)
  - Jon Culshaw, English impressionist
- June 4 – Scott Wolf, American actor
- June 5 – Sandra Annenberg, Brazilian newscaster, previously actress
- June 9 – Aleksandr Konovalov, Russian lawyer and politician
- June 10
  - Bill Burr, American comedian
  - Nobutoshi Canna, Japanese voice actor
- June 14
  - Yasmine Bleeth, American actress
  - Raj Thackeray, Indian politician
- June 16 – Mariana Mazzucato, Italian born-American economist
- June 20
  - Mateusz Morawiecki, Polish banker and politician, 17th Prime Minister of Poland
  - Robert Rodriguez, American film director
- June 24 – Boris Gelfand, Israeli chess grandmaster
- June 26
  - Troy Jackson, American politician, Senator-elect of Maine
  - Paolo Maldini, Italian football player
  - Jovenel Moïse, 42nd President of Haiti (d. 2021)
  - Iwan Roberts, Welsh footballer
- June 27 – Isabel Saint Malo, Panamanian politician
- June 28 – Chayanne, Puerto Rican-American singer
- June 29 – Theoren Fleury, Canadian ice hockey player
- June 30 – Phil Anselmo, American heavy metal vocalist

=== July ===
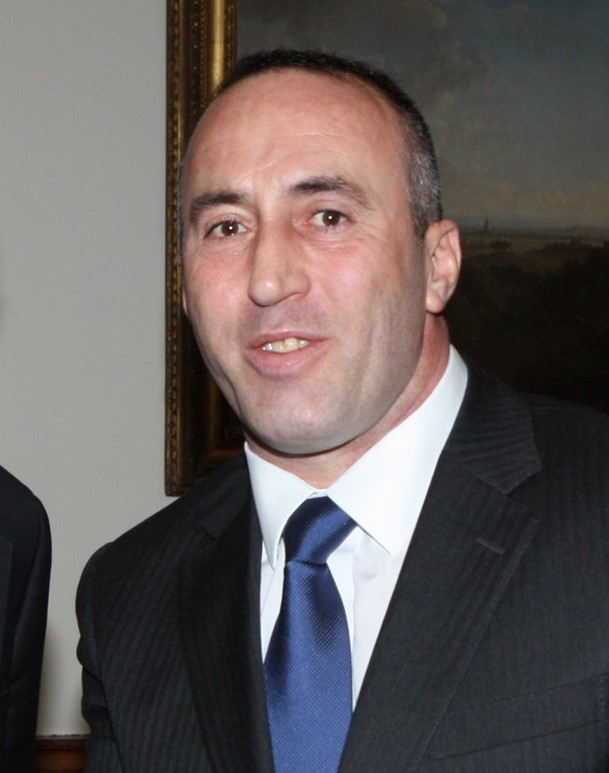
Ramush Haradinaj

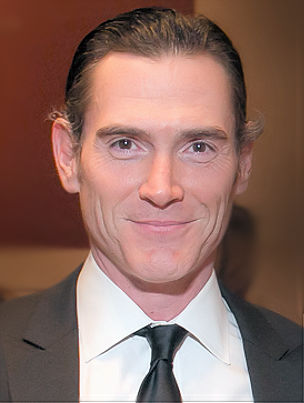
Billy Crudup

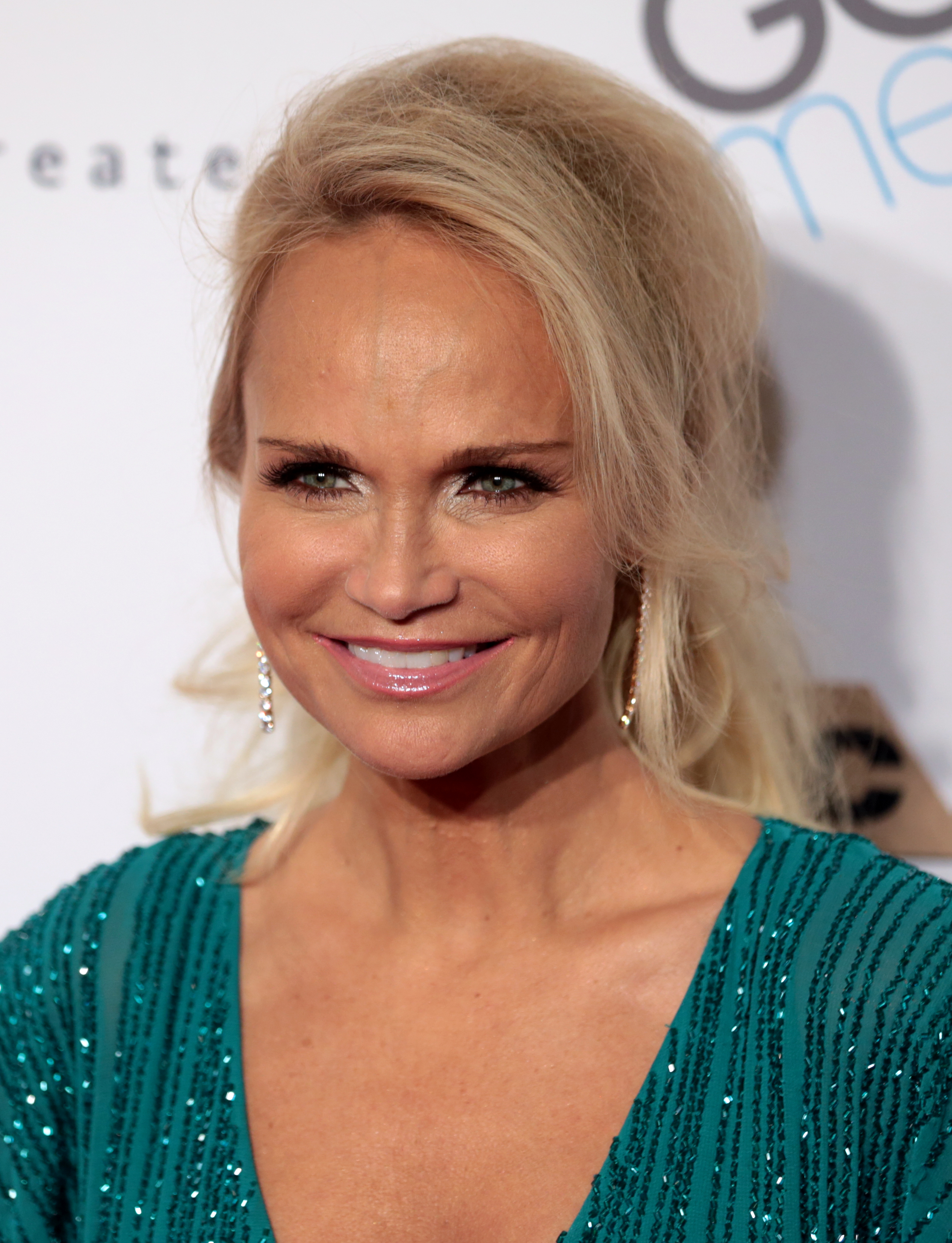
Kristin Chenoweth

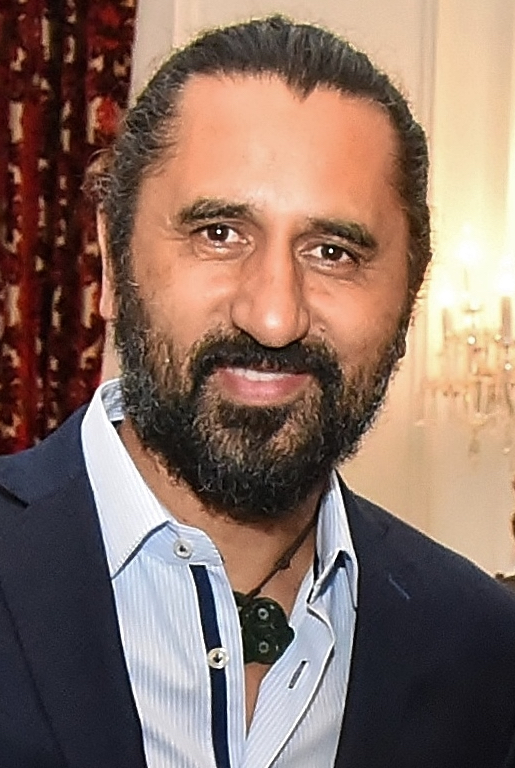
Cliff Curtis

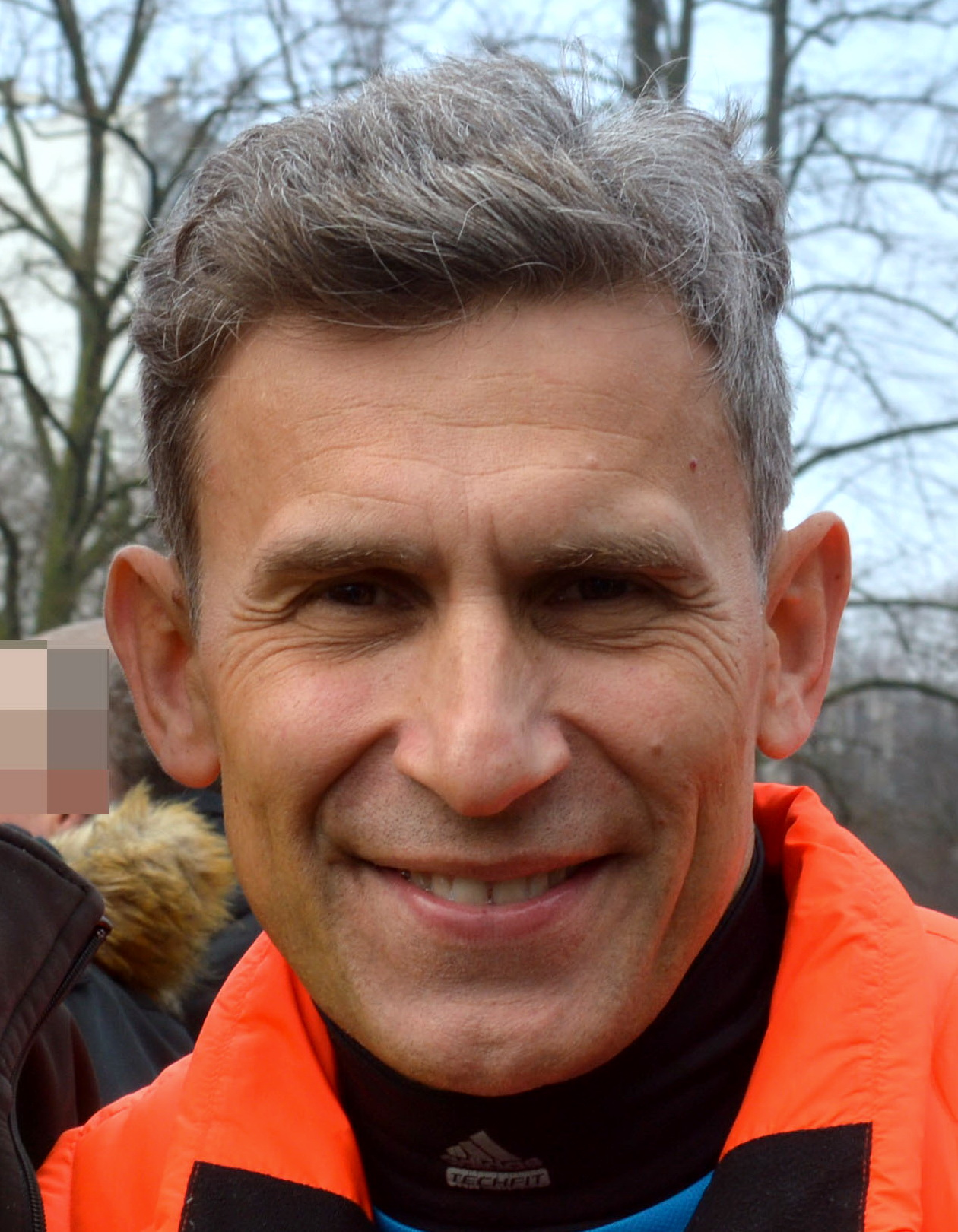
Robert Korzeniowski

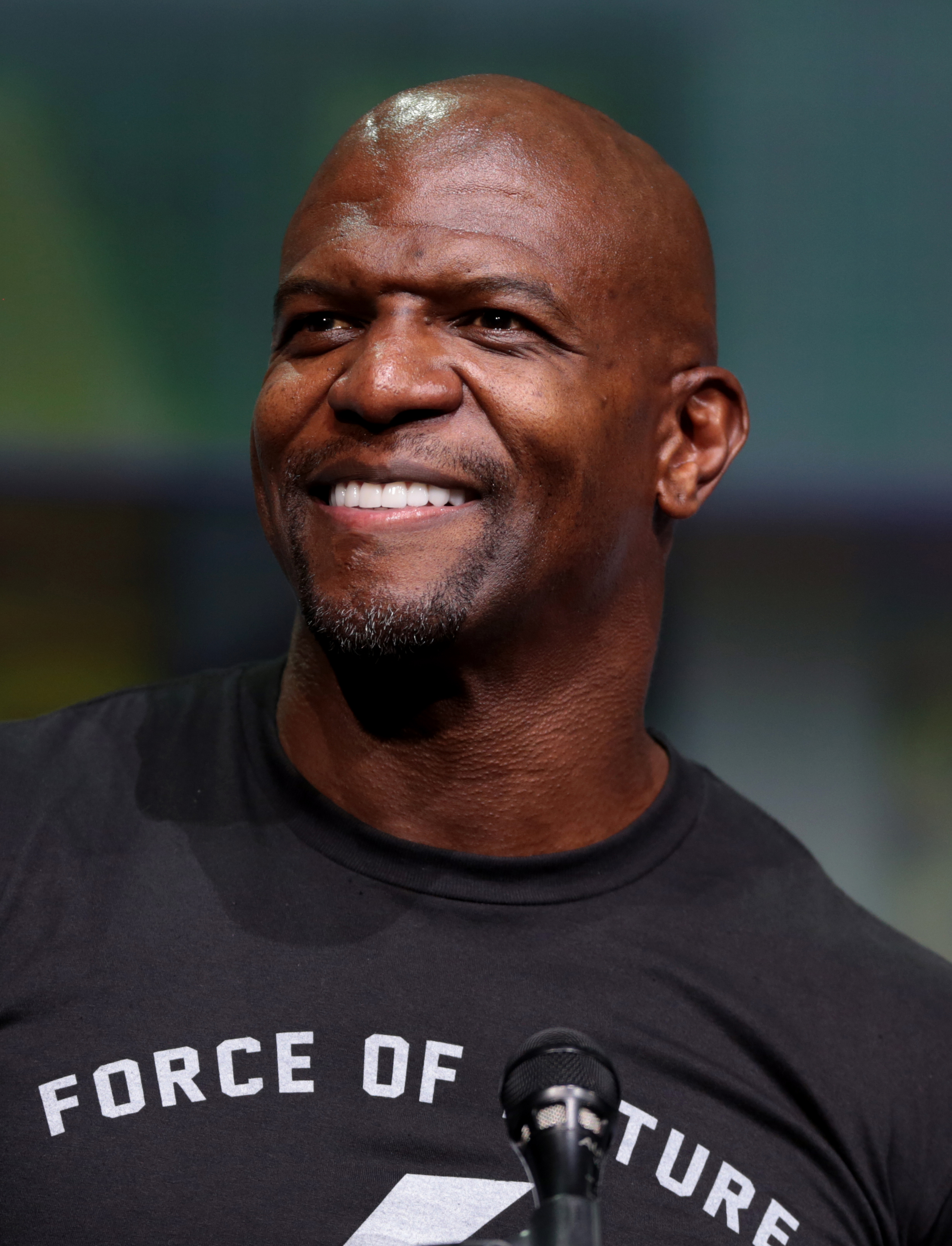
Terry Crews

- July 5
  - Ken Akamatsu, Japanese manga artist
  - Darin LaHood, American attorney and politician
  - Michael Stuhlbarg, American actor
- July 6 – Rashid Sidek, Malaysian badminton player and coach
- July 7
  - Jorja Fox, American actress
  - Jeff VanderMeer, American writer
- July 8
  - Billy Crudup, American actor
  - Josephine Teo, Singaporean politician
  - Michael Weatherly, American actor
- July 9 – Eduardo Santamarina, Mexican actor
- July 10 – Hassiba Boulmerka, Algerian athlete
- July 11 – Conrad Vernon, American voice actor and director
- July 13
  - Robert Gant, American actor
  - Omi Minami, Japanese voice actress
- July 14 – Samantha Gori, Italian basketball player
- July 15
  - Leticia Calderón, Mexican actress
  - Rosalinda Celentano, Italian actress
  - Eddie Griffin, American actor and comedian
- July 16
  - Dhanraj Pillay, Indian field hockey player
  - Barry Sanders, American football player
  - Olga de Souza, Brazilian-Italian singer, model and dancer
- July 17 – Beth Littleford, American actress and comedian
- July 18 – Grant Bowler, New Zealand-born Australian actor
- July 19 – Robert Flynn, American vocalist and guitarist (Machine Head)
- July 20 – Jimmy Carson, American ice hockey player
- July 23
  - Elden Campbell, American basketball player (d. 2025)
  - Gary Payton, American basketball player
  - Stephanie Seymour, American model and actress
- July 24
  - Kristin Chenoweth, American actress and singer
  - Troy Kotsur, American actor
  - Laura Leighton, American actress
- July 25 – John Grant, American singer-songwriter
- July 27
  - Cliff Curtis, New Zealand actor
  - Julian McMahon, Australian actor (d. 2025)
- July 30
  - Terry Crews, American actor, television host and artist, previously American football player
  - Robert Korzeniowski, Polish athlete

=== August ===
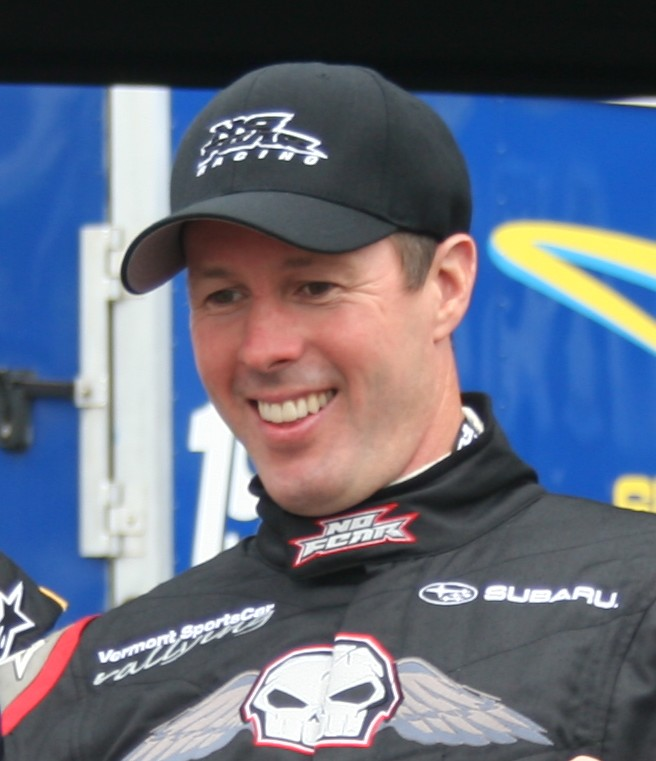
Colin McRae

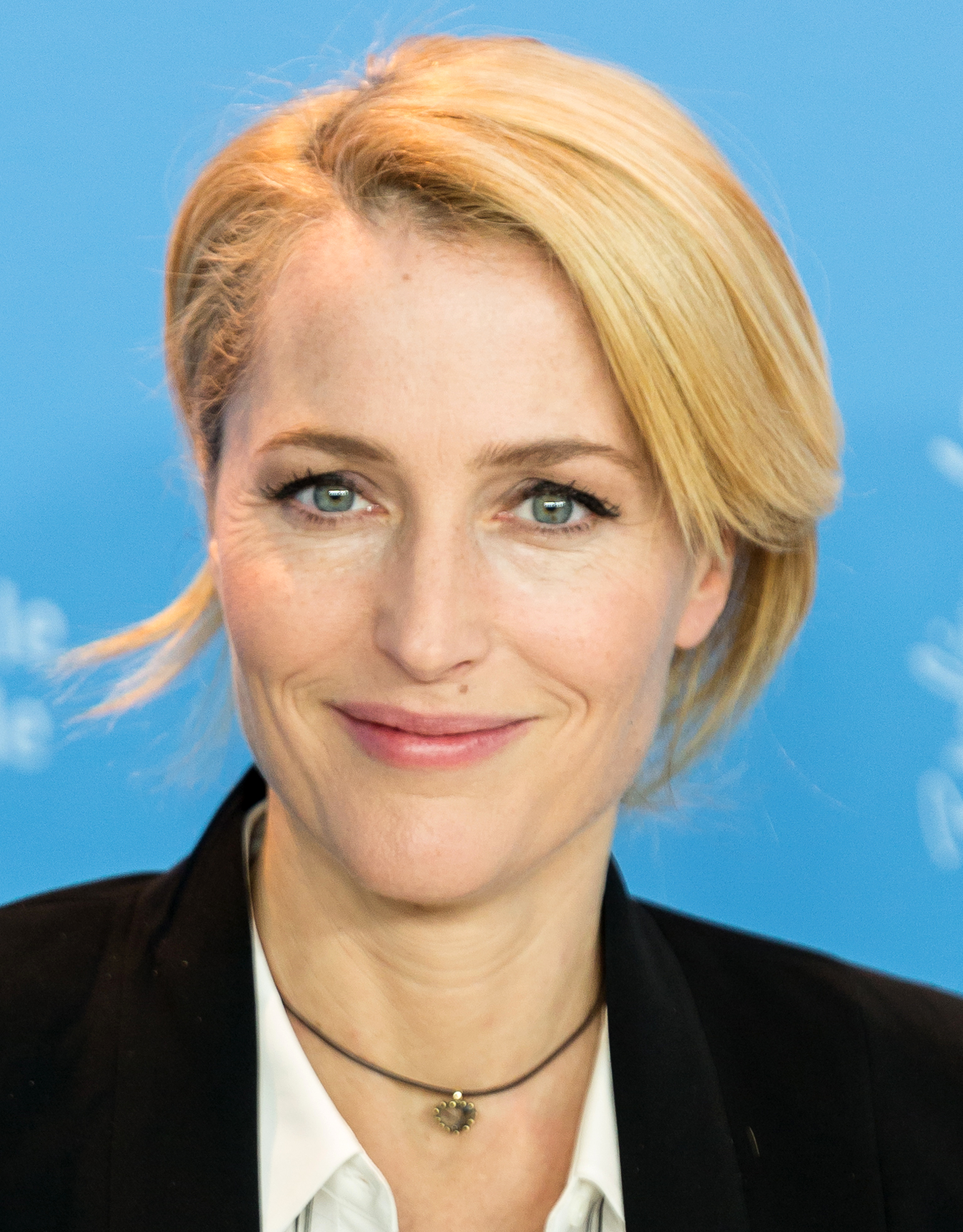
Gillian Anderson

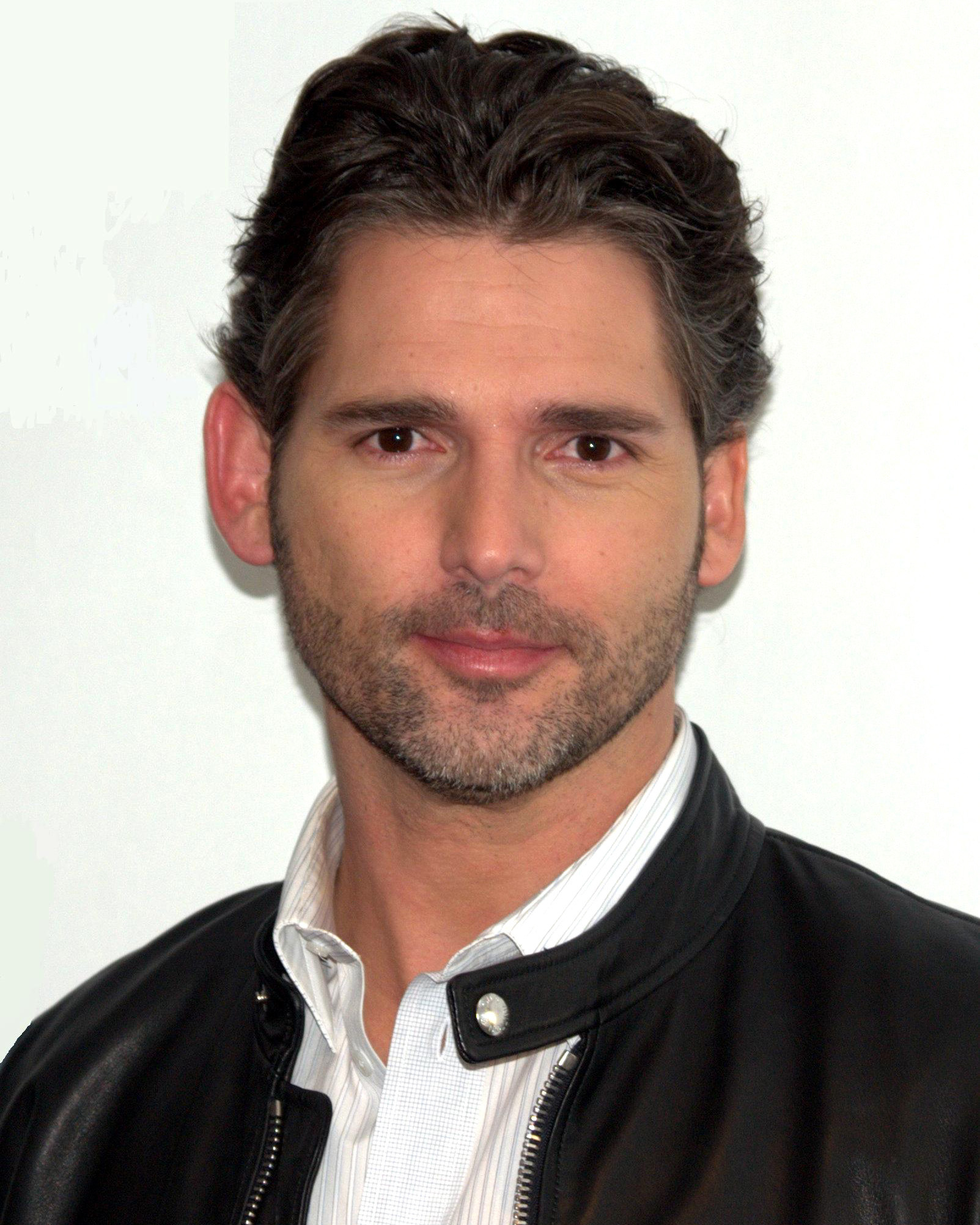
Eric Bana

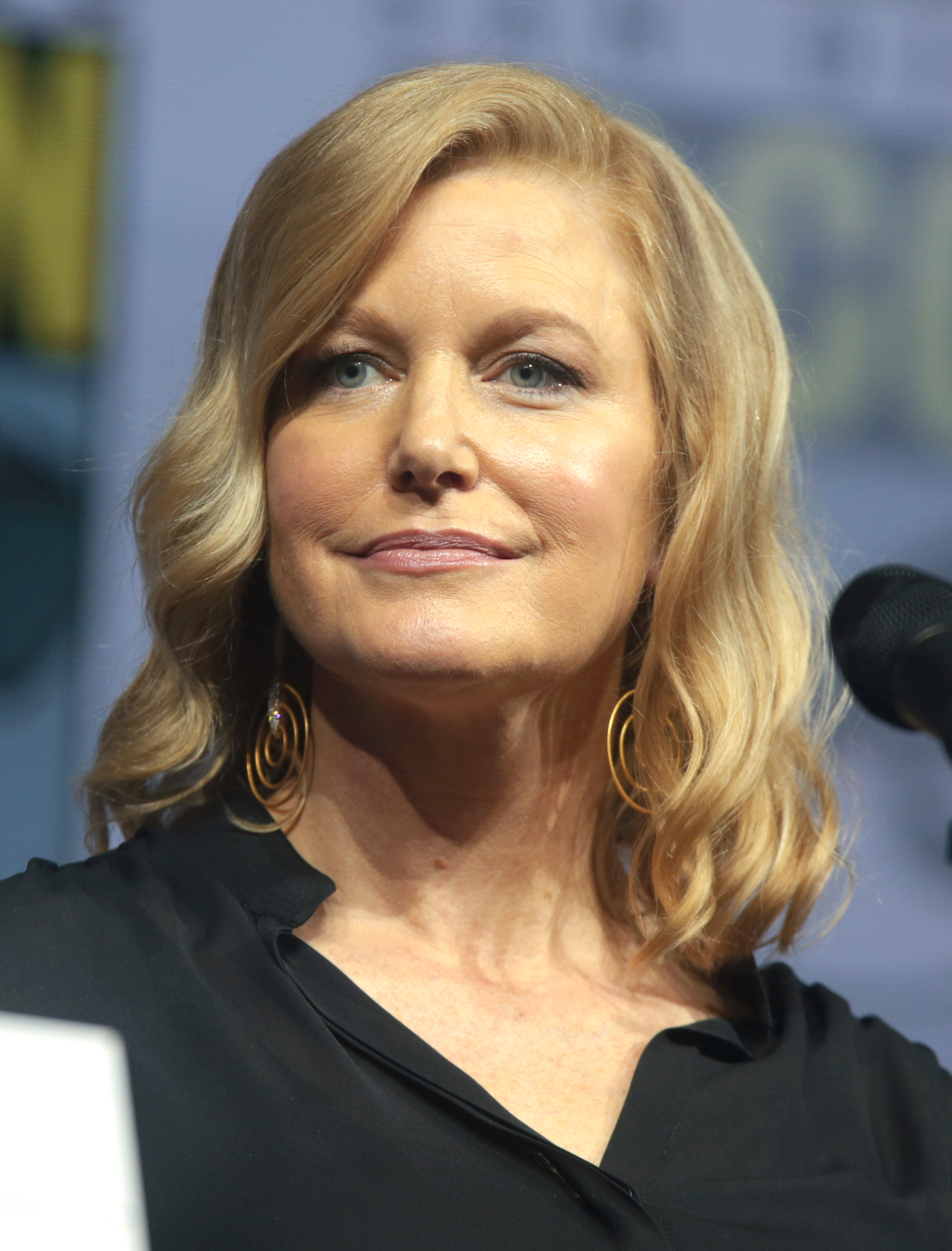
Anna Gunn

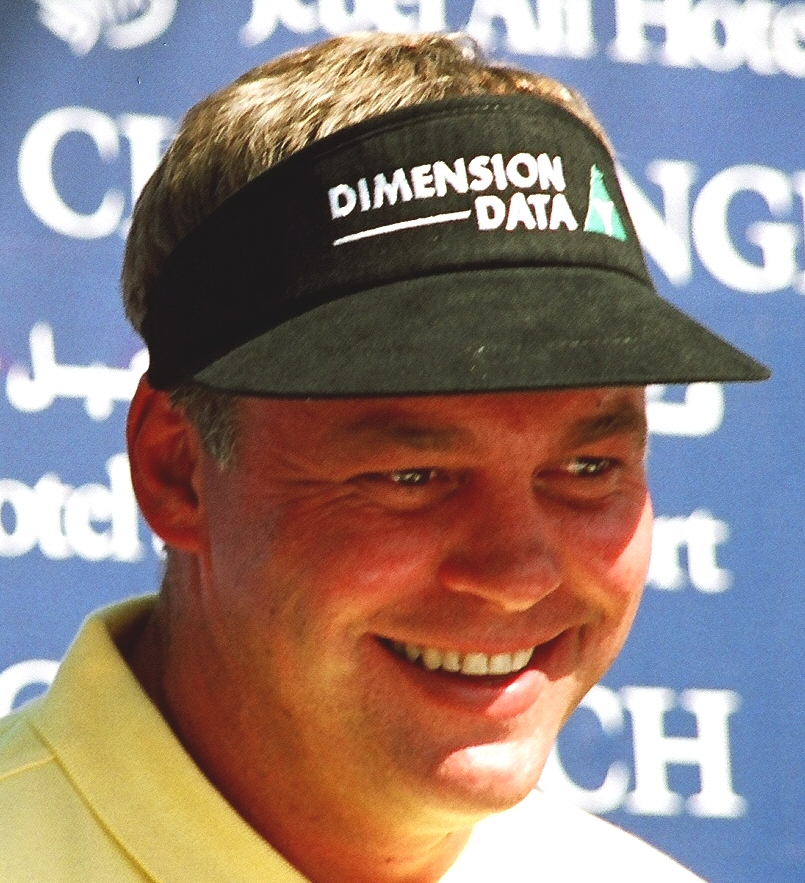
Darren Clarke

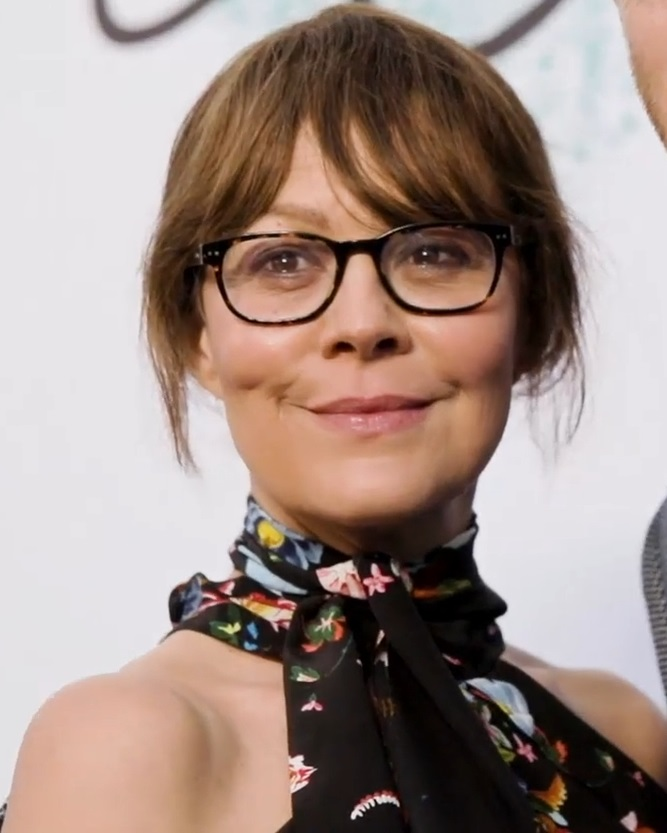
Helen McCrory

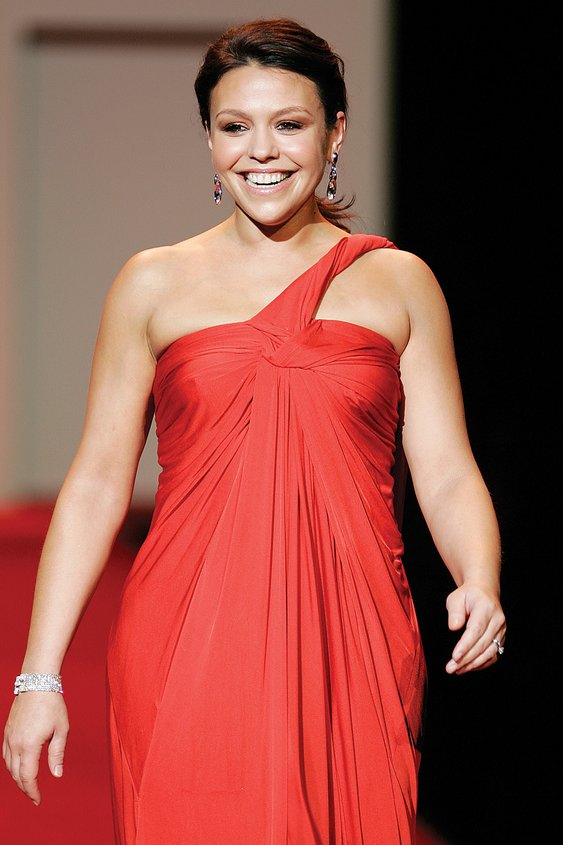
Rachael Ray

- August 1 – Pavo Urban, Croatian photographer (d. 1991)
- August 4
  - Lee Mack, English actor and stand-up comedian
  - Olga Neuwirth, Austrian composer
- August 5 – Patricia Tarabini, Argentine tennis player
  - Marine Le Pen, French politician
  - Colin McRae, Scottish rally car driver (d. 2007)
- August 6
- August 8 – Kimberly Brooks, American actress and voice artist
- August 9
  - Gillian Anderson, American actress
  - Eric Bana, Australian actor
  - James Roy, Australian author
- August 11 – Vladimir Kosterin, Ukrainian businessman and foundation president
- August 12
  - Pablo Rey, Spanish painter
  - Kōji Yusa, Japanese voice actor
- August 14
  - Catherine Bell, American actress
  - Darren Clarke, Northern Irish golfer
  - Jennifer Flavin, businesswoman, previously model
  - Jason Leonard, English rugby union player
- August 15 – Debra Messing, American actress
- August 16 – Arvind Kejriwal, Indian politician
- August 17
  - Bruno van Pottelsberghe, Belgian economist
  - Helen McCrory, English actress (d. 2021)
- August 20
  - Klas Ingesson, Swedish footballer (d. 2014)
  - Yuri Shiratori Japanese actress and singer
  - Bai Yansong, Chinese host
- August 21
  - Dina Carroll, British singer
  - Stretch, American rapper and record producer (d. 1995)
- August 24
  - Shoichi Funaki, Japanese professional wrestler
  - Hiroshi Kitadani, Japanese singer
  - Tim Salmon, American baseball player
  - Daniel Pollock, Australian actor (d. 1992)
- August 25 – Rachael Ray, American television chef and host
- August 27
  - Bong Rivera, Filipino politician and businessman
  - Luis Tascón, Venezuelan politician (d. 2010)
- August 28 – Billy Boyd, Scottish actor
- August 31
  - Valdon Dowiyogo, Nauruan politician and Australian football player
  - Hideo Nomo, Japanese baseball player

=== September ===
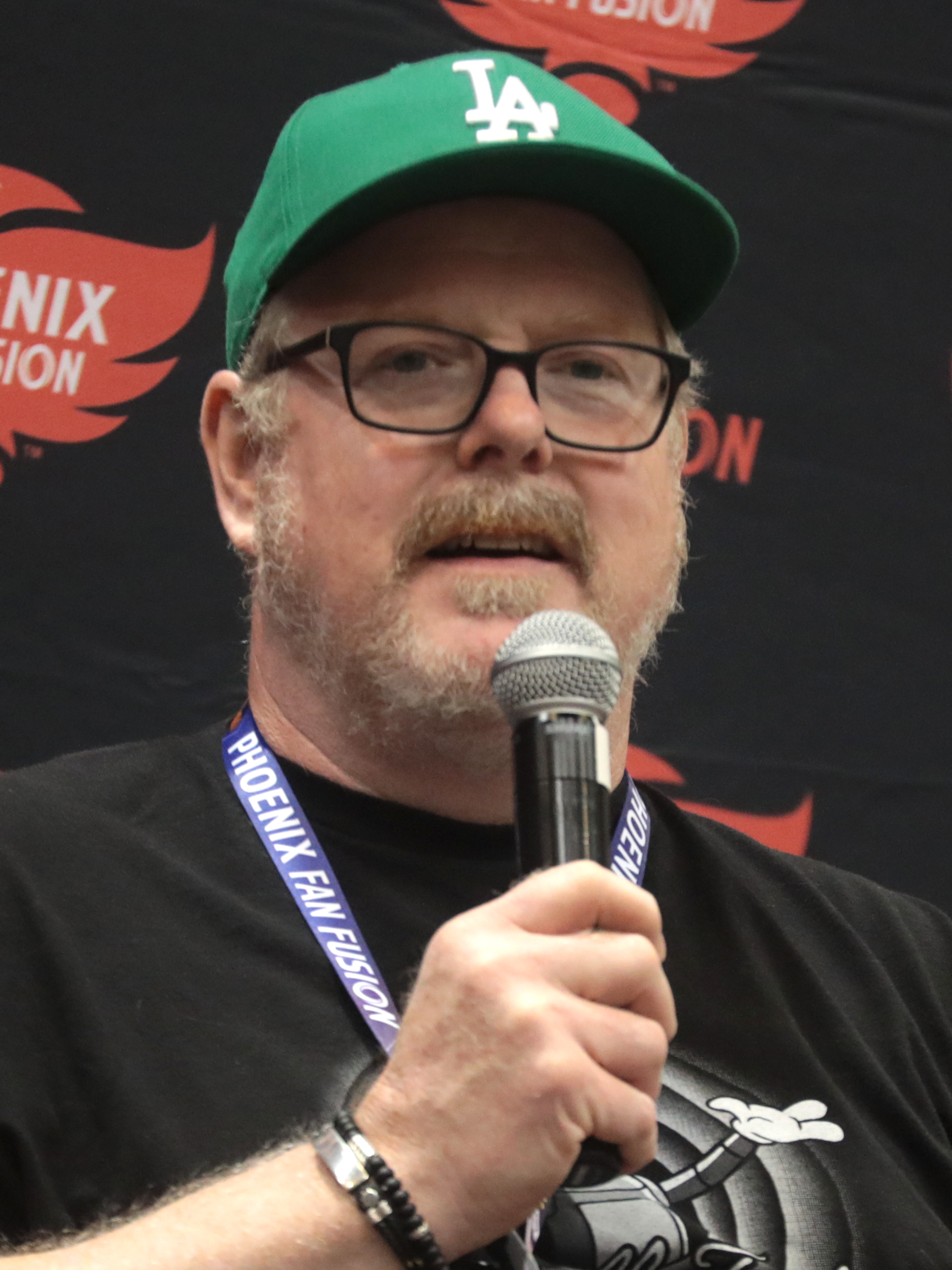
John DiMaggio

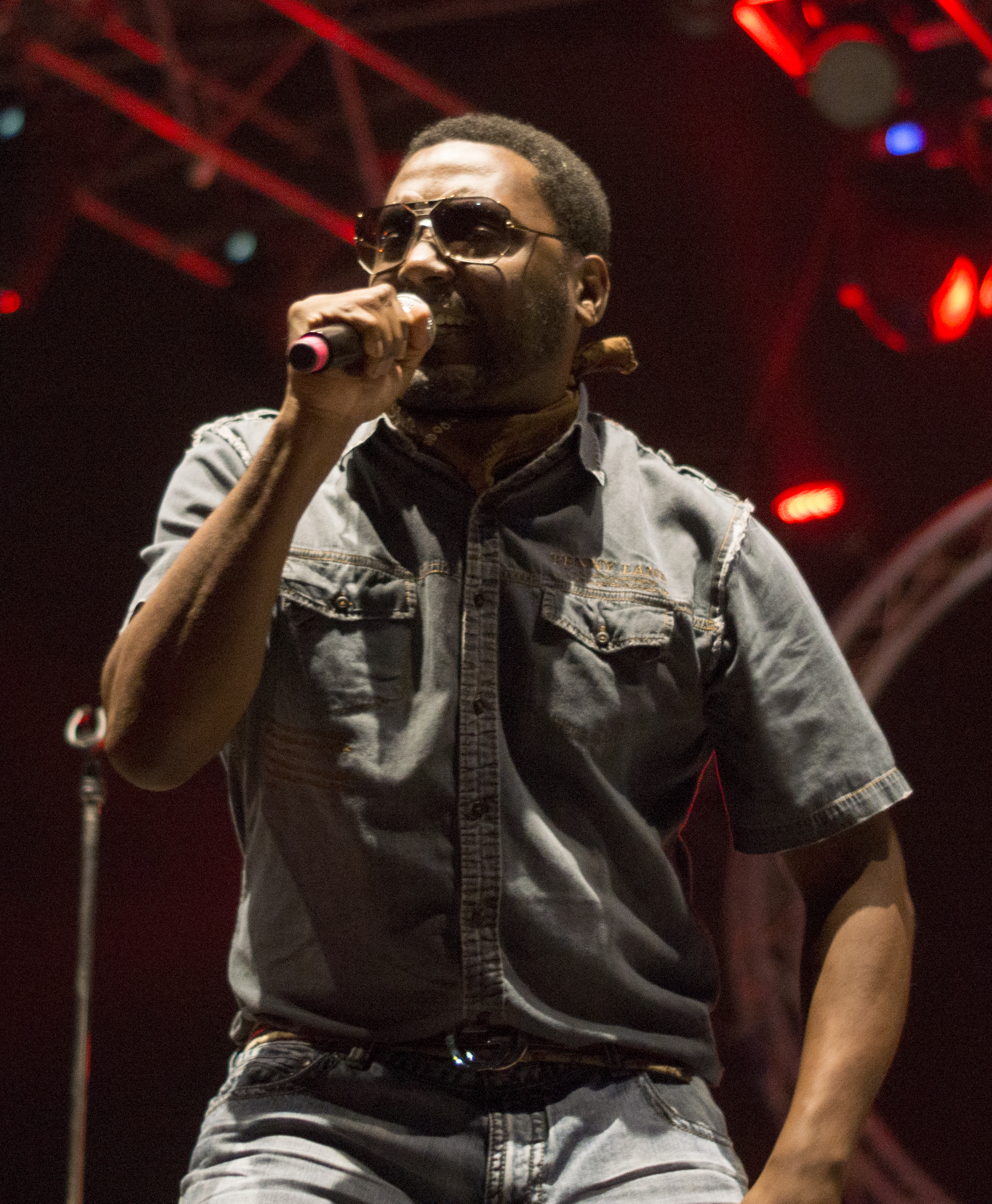
Big Daddy Kane

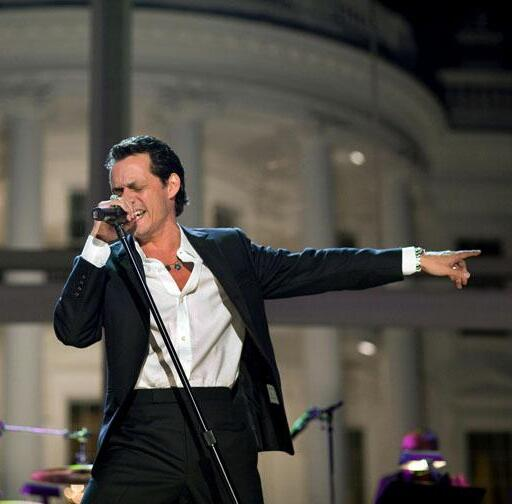
Marc Anthony

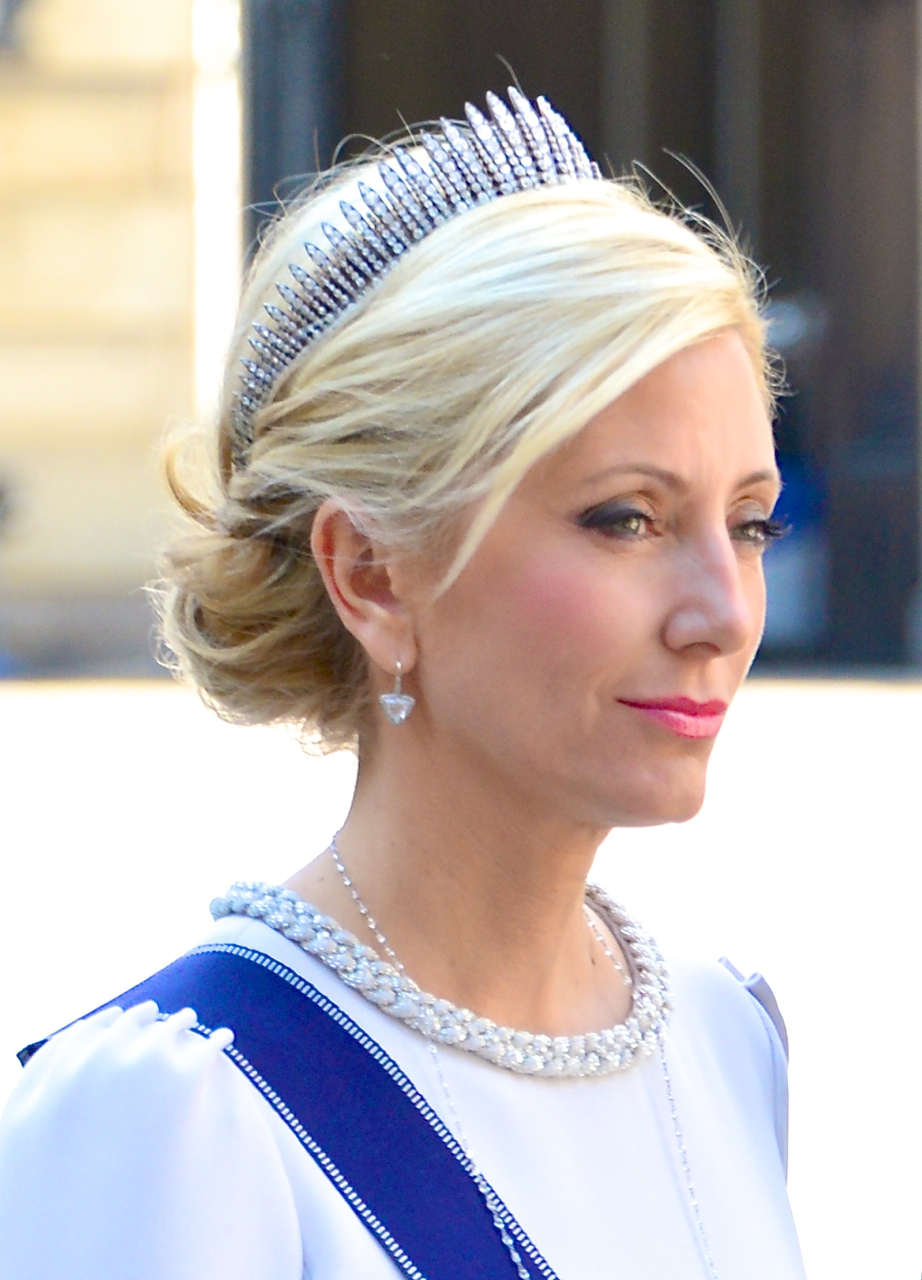
Marie-Chantal, Crown Princess of Greece

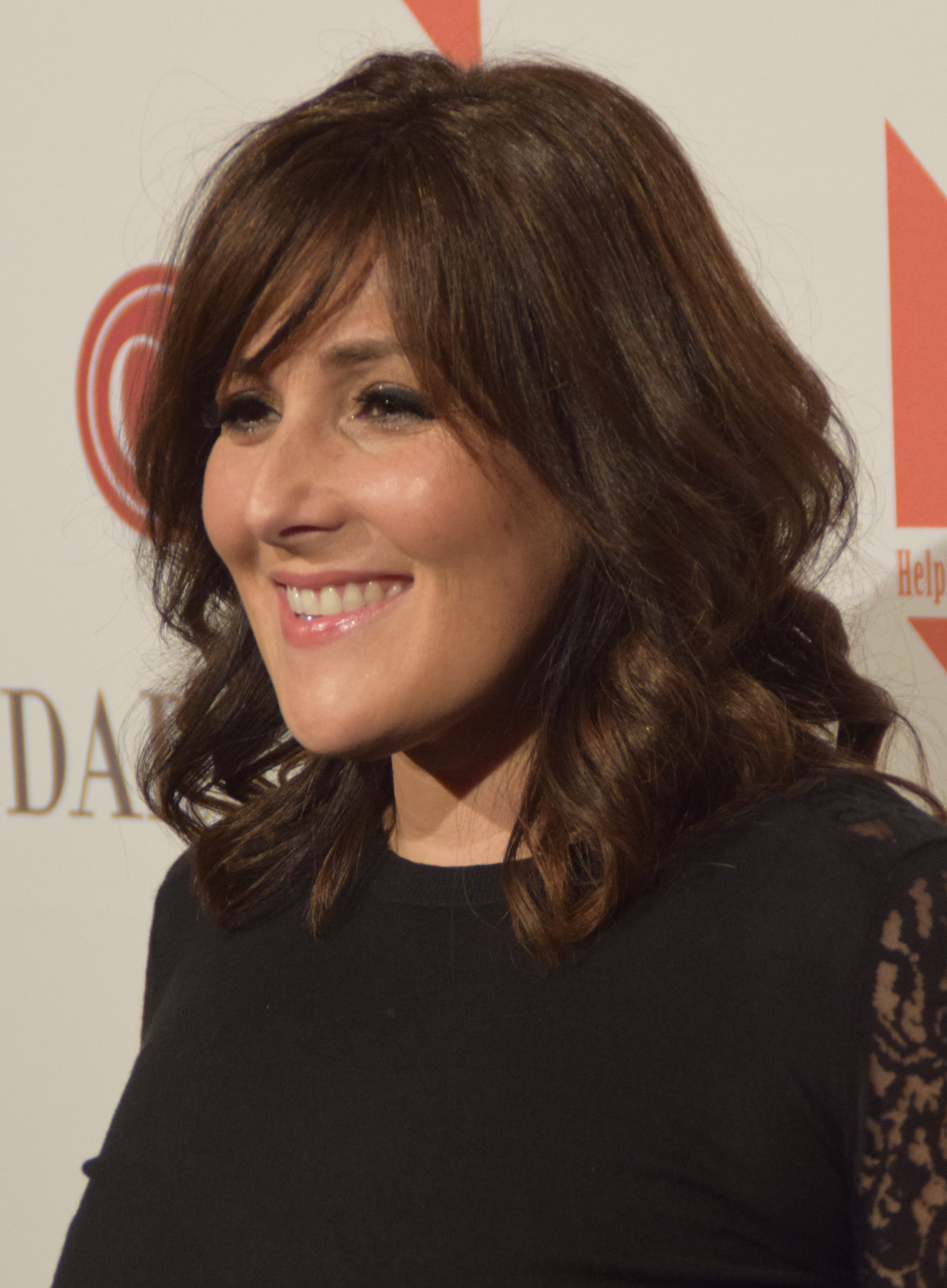
Ricki Lake

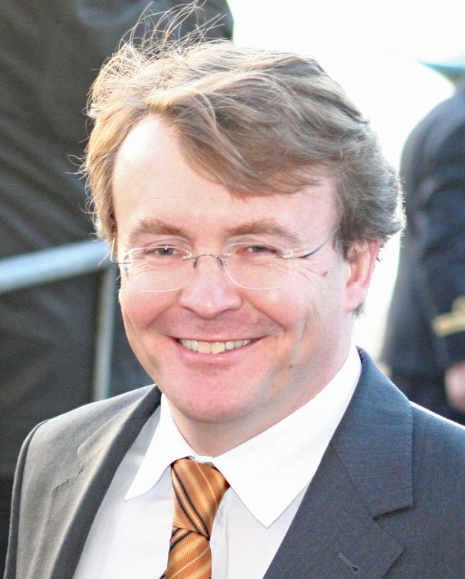
Prince Friso of Orange-Nassau

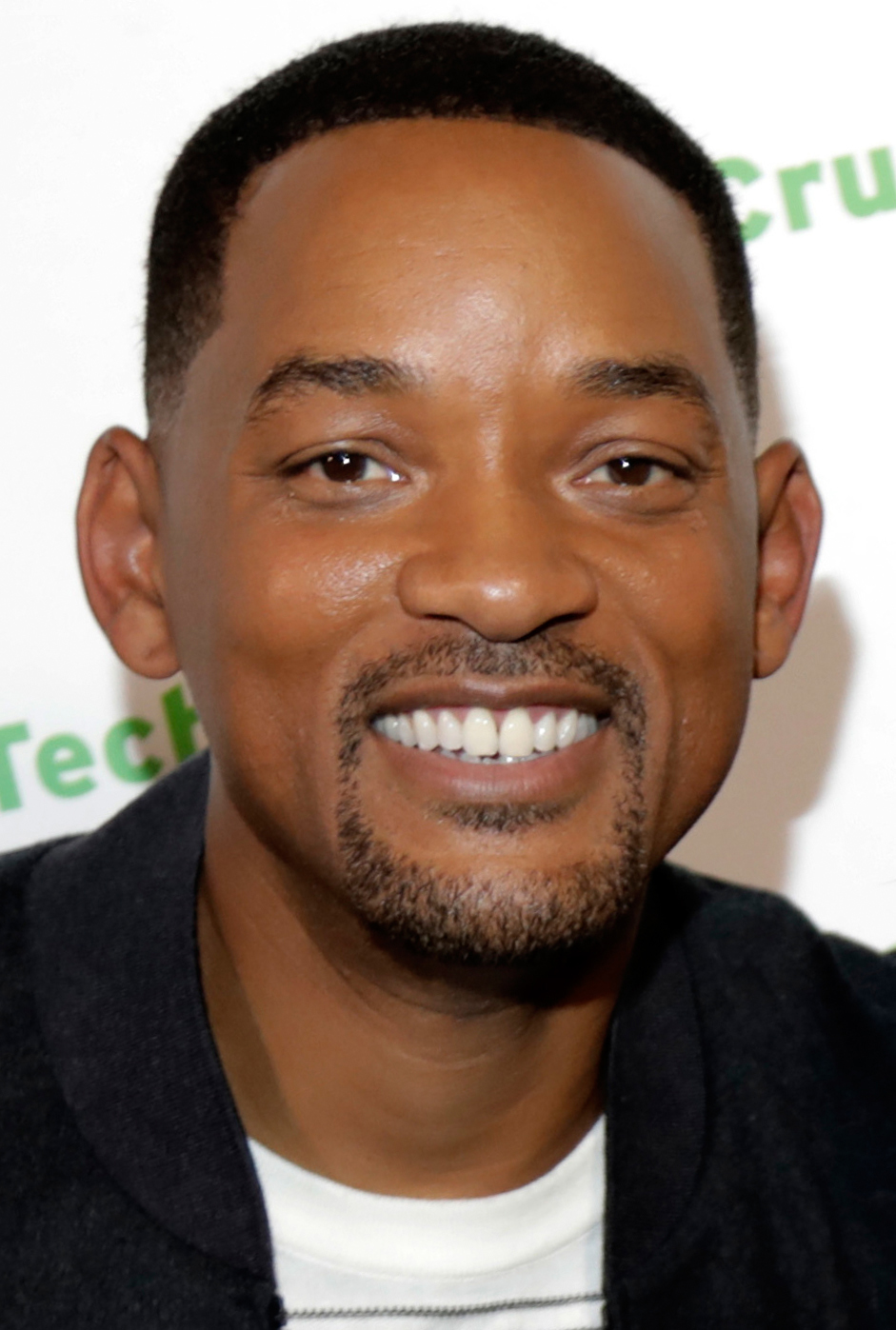
Will Smith

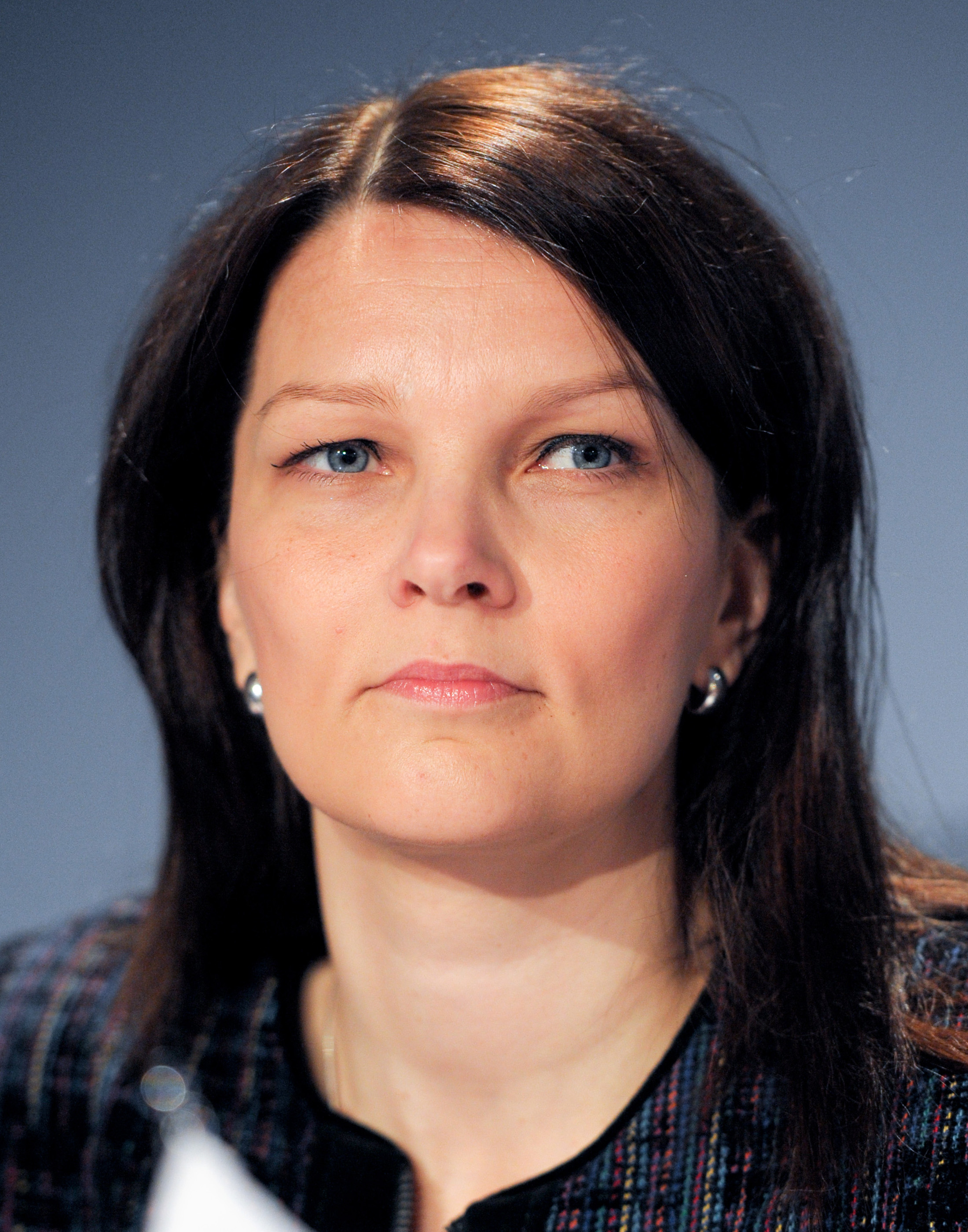
Mari Kiviniemi

- September 1
  - Mohamed Atta, 9/11 ringleader of the hijackers and pilot of American Airlines Flight 11 (d. 2001)
  - Atsuko Yuya, Japanese voice actress
- September 2 – Francisco Acevedo, American serial killer
- September 4
  - John DiMaggio, American voice actor and comedian
  - Mike Piazza, American baseball player
- September 5 – Thomas Levet, French golfer
- September 7 – Marcel Desailly, French footballer
- September 9 – Julia Sawalha, English actress
- September 10
  - Big Daddy Kane, American hip-hop artist
  - Guy Ritchie, British film director
- September 13 – Laura Cutina, Romanian artistic gymnast
- September 16 – Marc Anthony, American actor and singer
- September 17
  - Anastacia, American singer-songwriter
  - Tito Vilanova, Spanish football manager (d. 2014)
- September 18 – Toni Kukoč, Croatian basketball player
- September 20 – Van Jones, African-American author
- September 21
  - Lisa Angell, French singer
  - Ricki Lake, American actress, producer and television presenter
- September 22 – Mihai Răzvan Ungureanu, 62nd Prime Minister of Romania
- September 23 – Michelle Thomas, American actress (d. 1998)
- September 25
  - Prince Friso of Orange-Nassau, (d. 2013)
  - John A. List, American economist
  - Will Smith, African-American actor and rapper
- September 26
  - James Caviezel, American actor
  - Tricia O'Kelley, American actress
  - Ben Shenkman, American television, film and stage actor
- September 27
  - Mari Kiviniemi, 62nd Prime Minister of Finland
  - Shofiqul Haque Milon, Bangladeshi politician
- September 28
  - Mika Häkkinen, Finnish double Formula 1 world champion
  - Naomi Watts, British actress and film producer
- September 29
  - Patrick Burns, American paranormal investigator and television personality
  - Luke Goss, English singer and actor
  - Alex Skolnick, American jazz/heavy metal guitarist
  - Samir Soni, Indian film and TV actor
- September 30 – Bennet Omalu, Nigerian pathologist

=== October ===
- October 1
  - Kevin Griffin, American singer-songwriter, frontman of Better Than Ezra
  - Mark Durden-Smith, British television presenter
  - Jay Underwood, American actor
- October 2
  - Lucy Cohu, English actress
  - Victoria Derbyshire, English broadcast presenter
  - Jana Novotná, Czech tennis player (d. 2017)
- October 3 – Nadia Calviño, Spanish politician
- October 7
  - Luminița Anghel, Romanian dance/pop recording artist, songwriter, television personality and politician
  - Thom Yorke, British singer-songwriter
- October 8
  - Daniela Castelo, Argentine journalist (d. 2011)
  - Emily Procter, American actress
- October 9
  - Troy Davis, American high-profile death row inmate and human rights activist (d. 2011)
  - Pete Docter, American animator, director
- October 10
  - Bart Brentjens, Dutch mountainbiker
  - Feridun Düzağaç, Turkish rock singer-songwriter
- October 11
  - Tiffany Grant, American voice actress
  - Jane Krakowski, American actress
- October 12
  - Paul Harragon, Australian rugby league player
  - Hugh Jackman, Australian actor, singer and producer
- October 13 – Tisha Campbell, American actress and singer
- October 14 – Matthew Le Tissier, English footballer
- October 15
  - Didier Deschamps, French footballer
  - Jyrki 69, Finnish singer
  - Nashwa Mustafa, Egyptian actress
- October 16 – Michael Stich, German tennis player
- October 22 – Shaggy, Jamaican singer
- October 24 – Mark Walton, American story artist, actor
- October 27 – Alain Auderset, Swedish writer
- October 28 – Juan Orlando Hernández, 55th President of Honduras
- October 29
  - Johann Olav Koss, Norwegian speed skater
  - Tsunku, Japanese singer, music producer and song composer

=== November ===
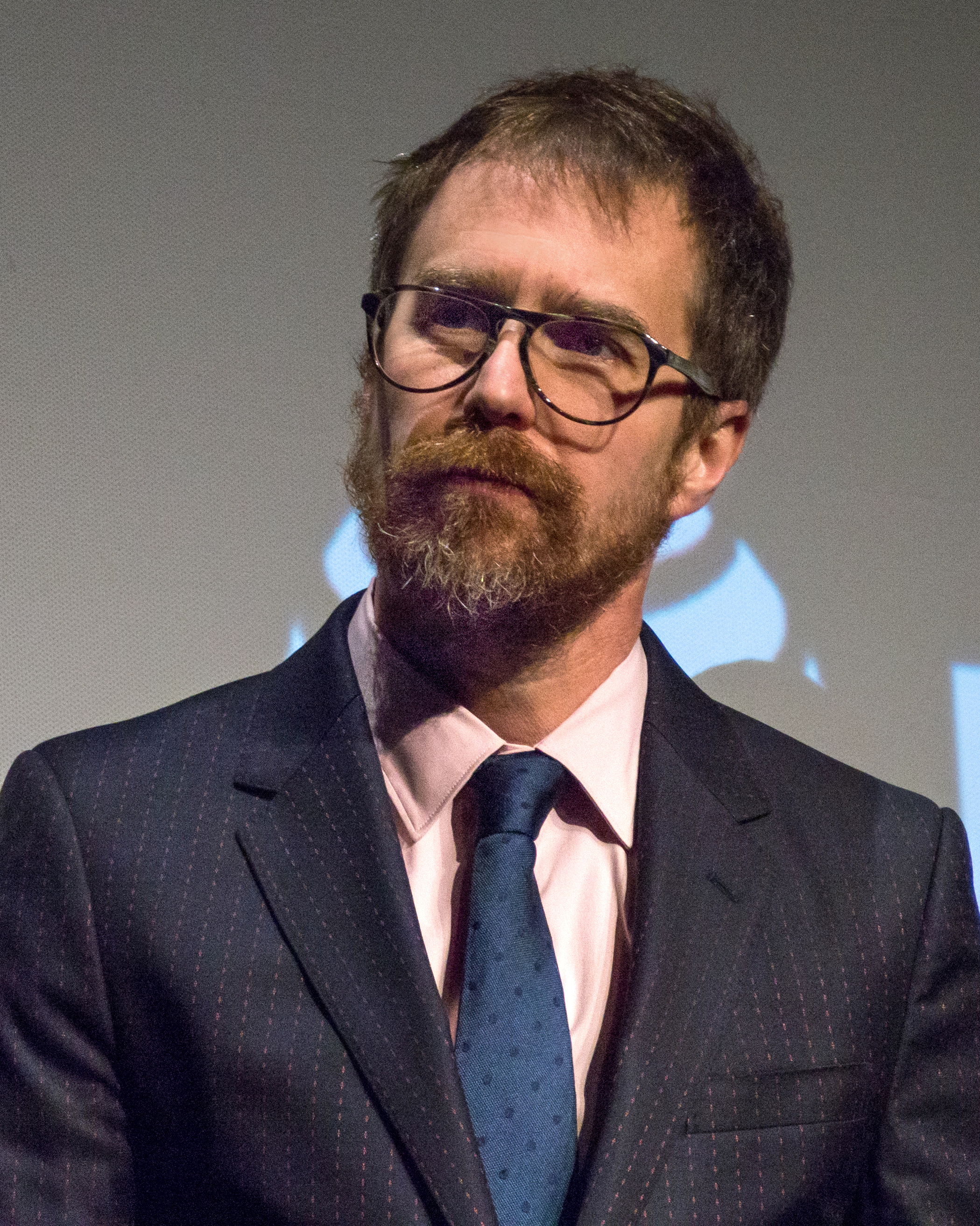
Sam Rockwell

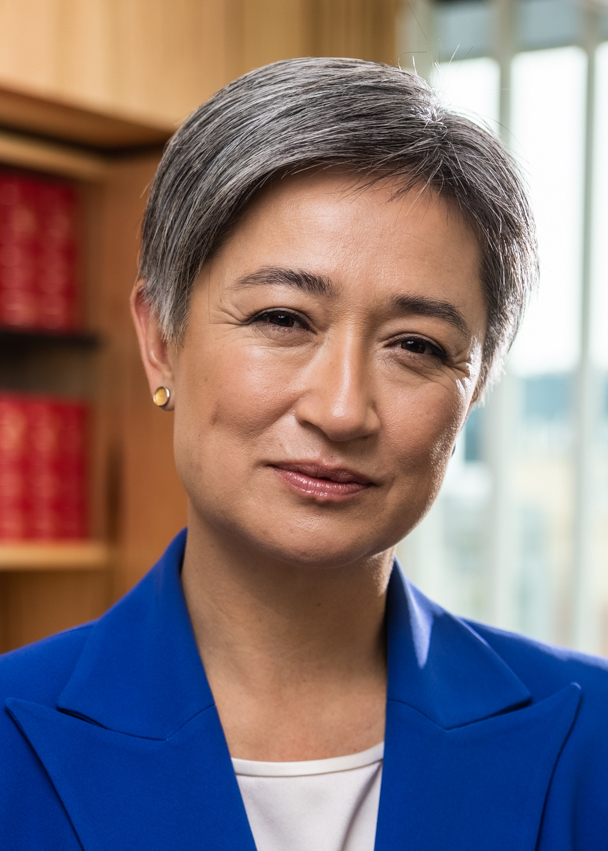
Penny Wong

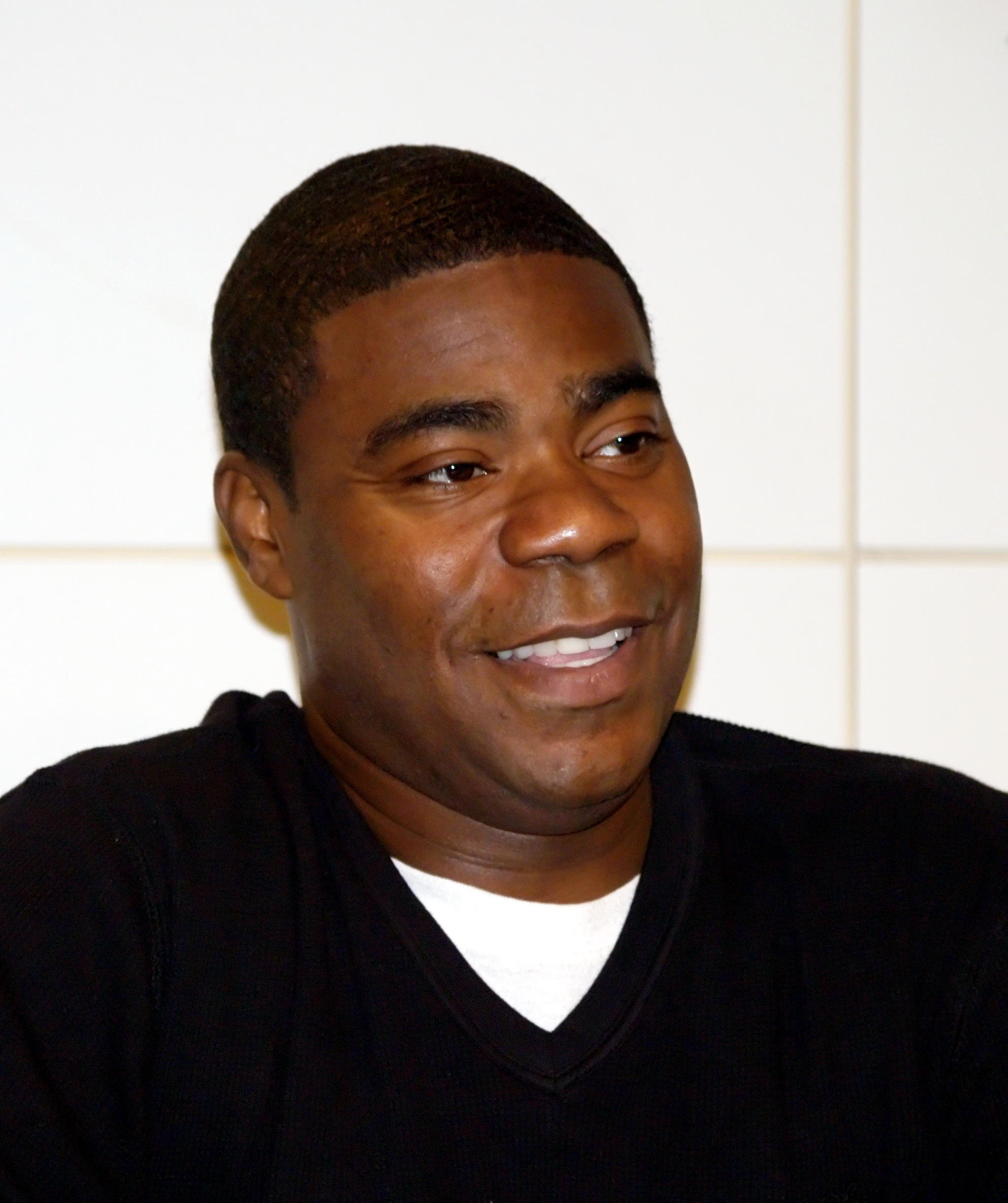
Tracy Morgan

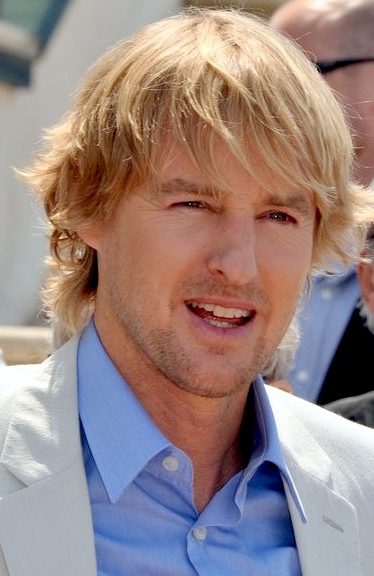
Owen Wilson

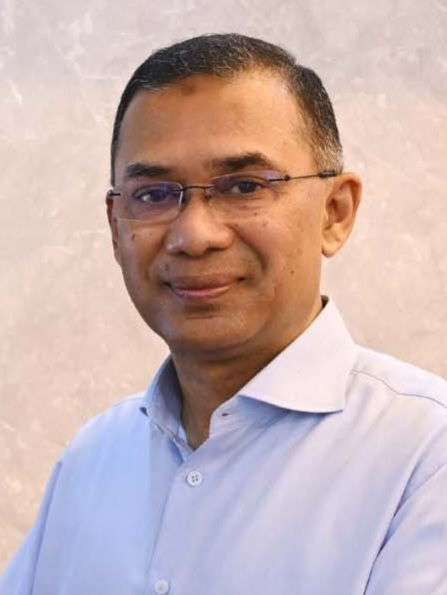
Tarique Rahman

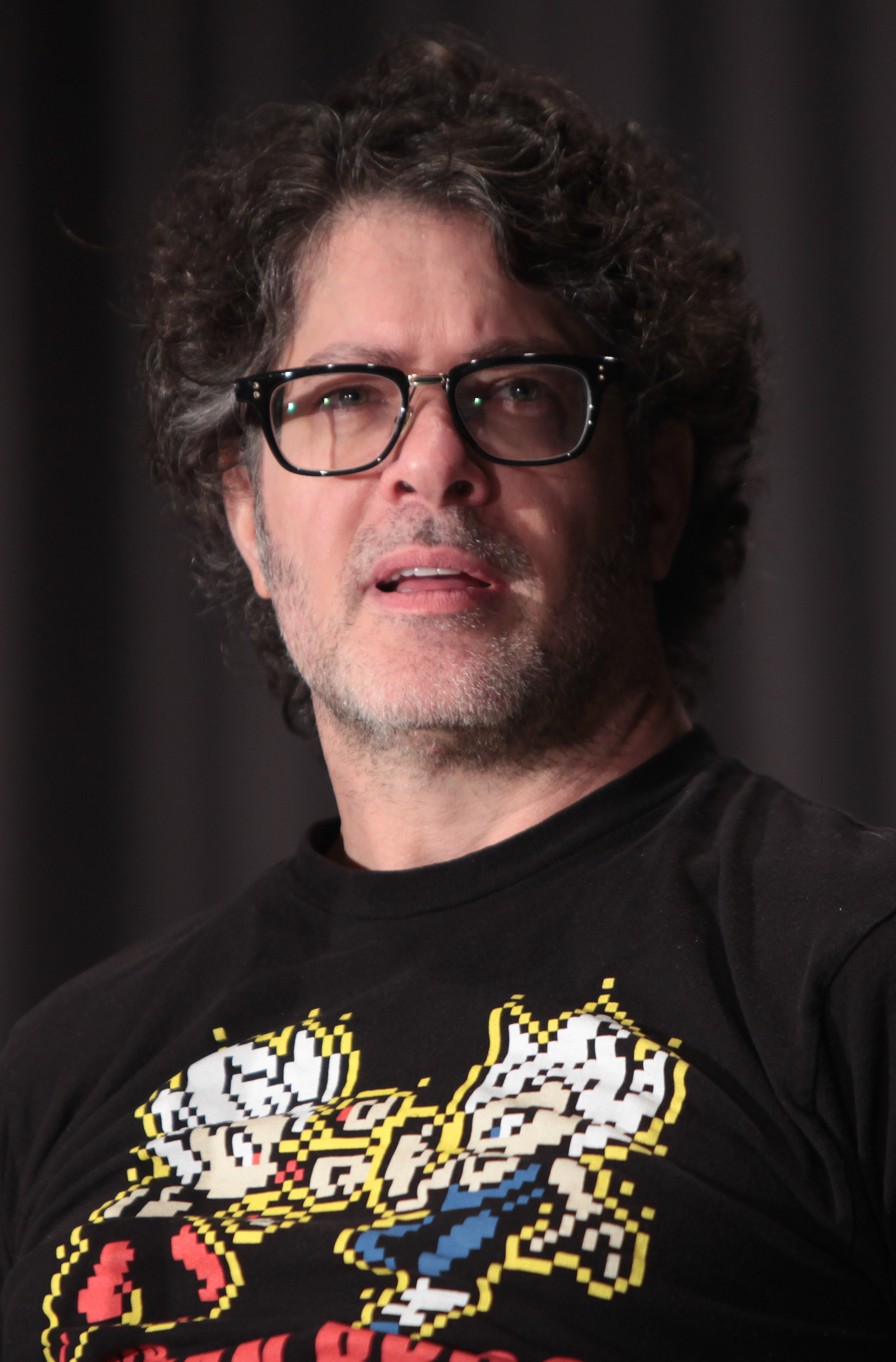
Sean Schemmel

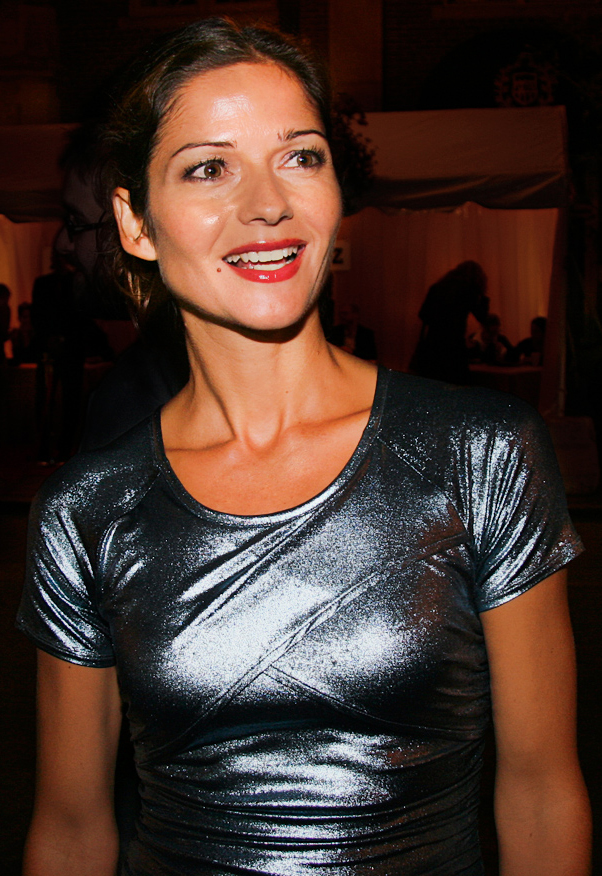
Jill Hennessy

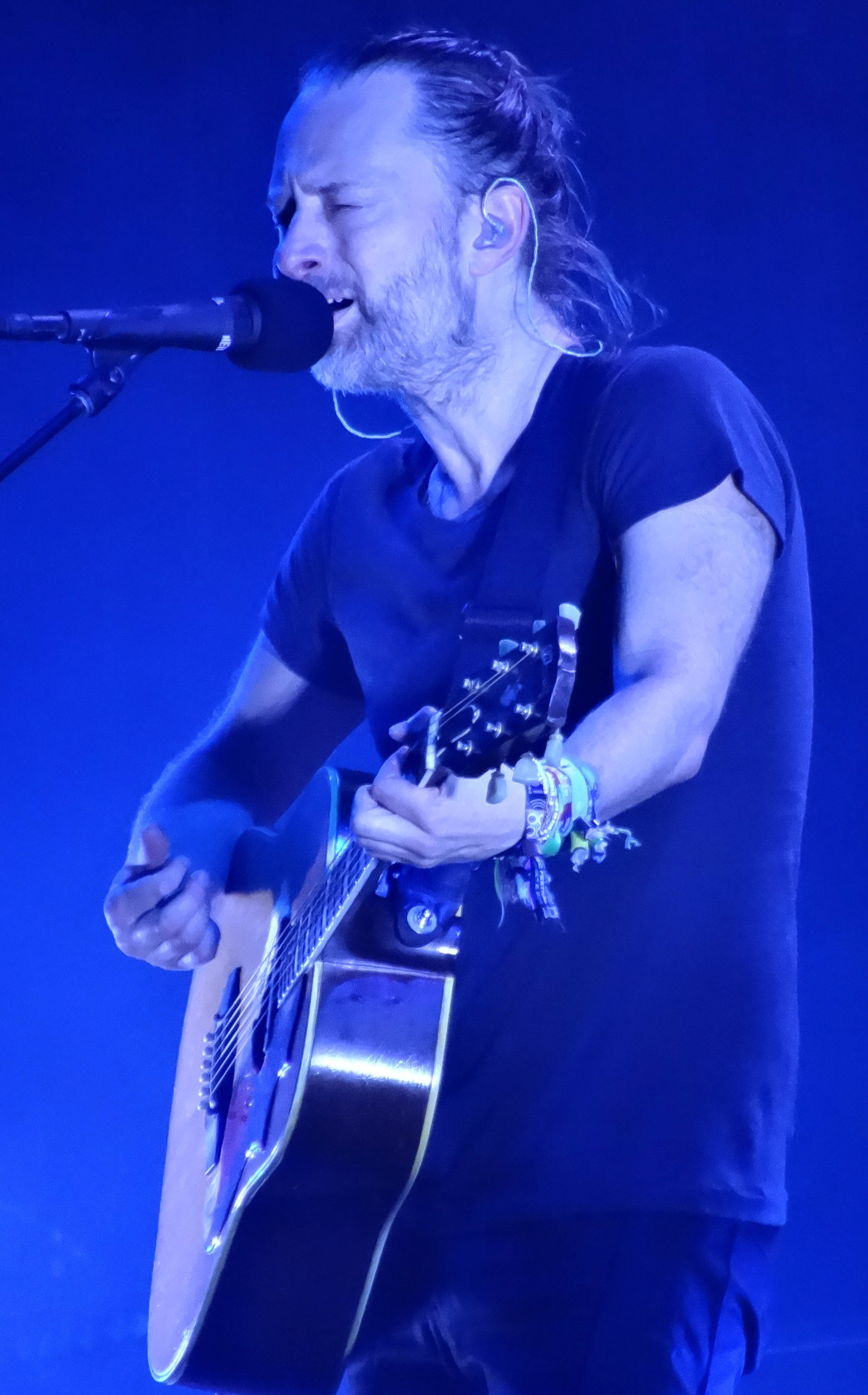
Thom Yorke

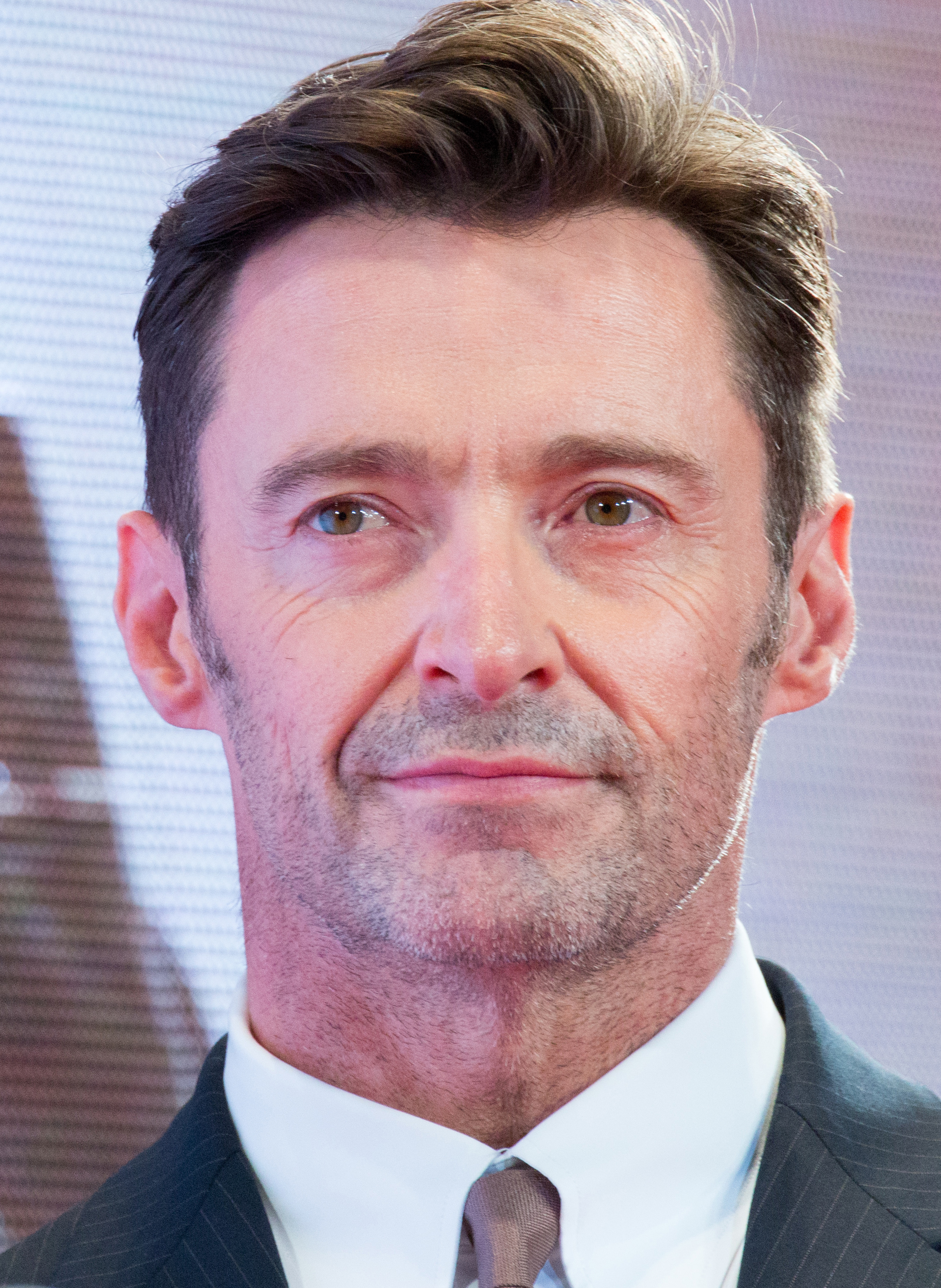
Hugh Jackman

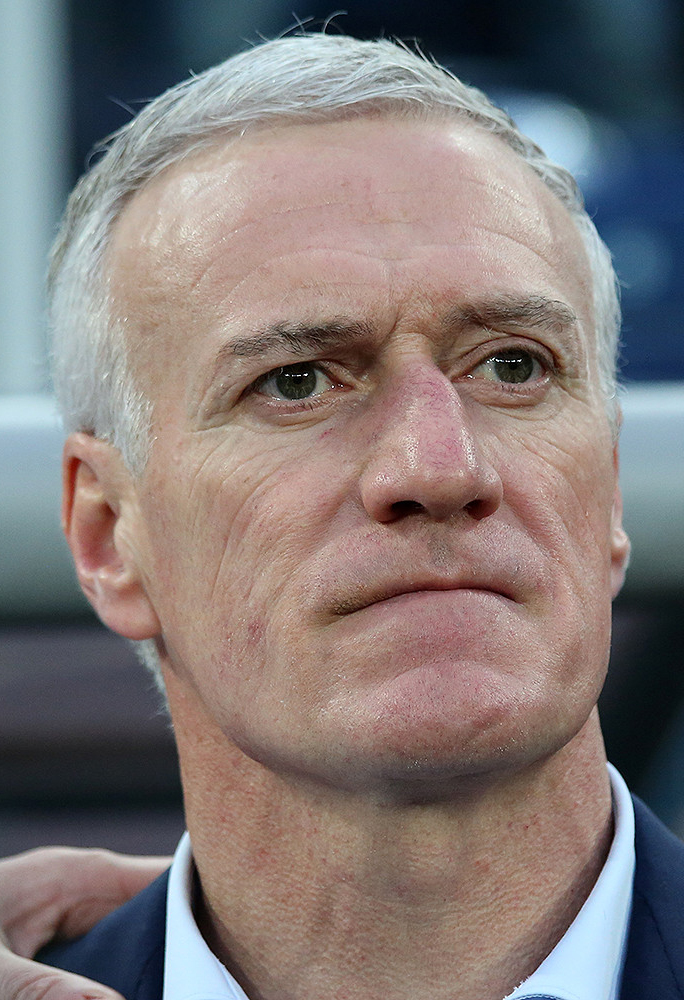
Didier Deschamps

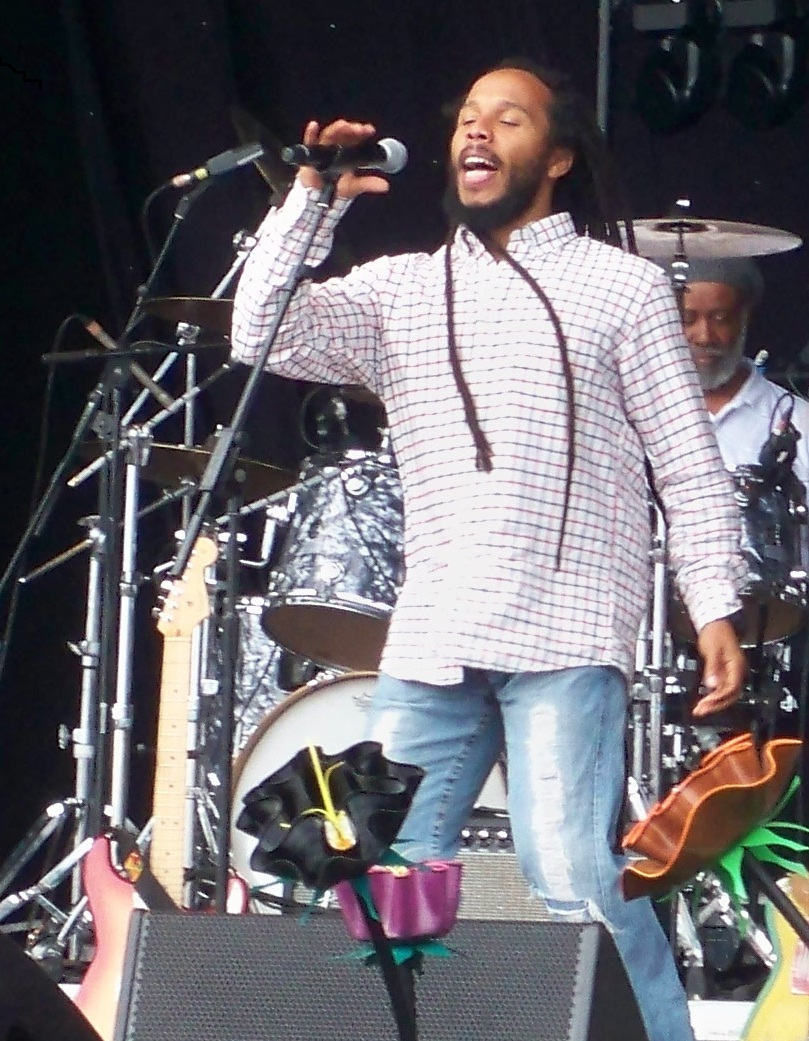
Ziggy Marley

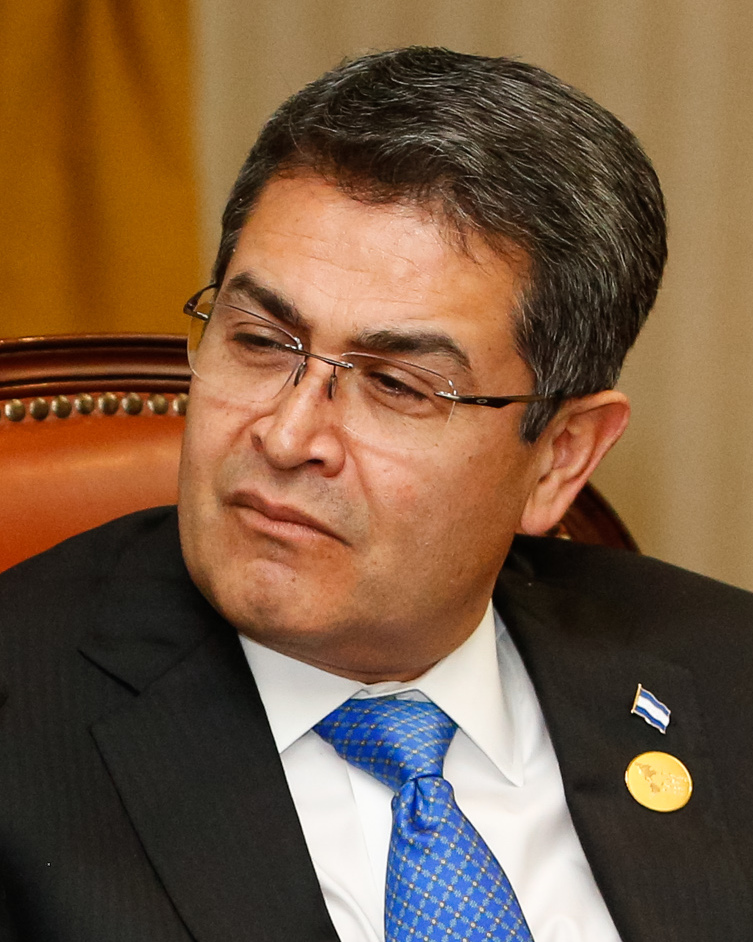
Juan Orlando Hernández

- November 1 – Silvio Fauner, Italian cross-country skier
- November 4
  - Lee Germon, New Zealand cricketer
  - Daniel Landa, Czech composer, singer and actor
  - Miles Long, American pornographic actor and director
- November 5
  - Mr. Catra, Brazilian musician (d. 2018)
  - Sam Rockwell, American actor
  - Seth Gilliam, African-American actor
  - Penny Wong, Australian politician, Minister for Foreign Affairs
- November 6 – Kelly Rutherford, American actress
- November 7 – Ignacio Padilla, Mexican writer (d. 2016)
- November 8
  - Parker Posey, American actress
  - Zara Whites, Dutch actress
- November 9 – Nazzareno Carusi, Italian classical pianist
- November 10 – Tracy Morgan, African-American actor and comedian
- November 12
  - Kathleen Hanna, American musician and activist
  - Aya Hisakawa, Japanese voice actress
  - Sammy Sosa, Dominican Major League Baseball player
- November 13 – Pat Hentgen, American baseball player
- November 15
  - Fausto Brizzi, Italian screenwriter and film director
  - Ol' Dirty Bastard, American rapper (d. 2004)
- November 16 – Tammy Lauren, American actress
- November 18
  - Barry Hunter, Northern Irish footballer and football manager
  - Luizianne Lins, Brazilian politician
  - Owen Wilson, American actor and comedian
- November 20
  - Chew Chor Meng, Singaporean Chinese television actor
  - Tarique Rahman - Bangladeshi politician, 11th Prime Minister of Bangladesh
  - Jules Trobaugh, American artist and photographer
- November 21
  - Qiao Hong, Chinese table tennis player
  - Sean Schemmel, American voice actor
- November 24
  - Awie, Malaysian rock singer
  - yukihiro, Japanese musician
- November 25 – Jill Hennessy, Canadian actress
- November 27 – Michael Vartan, French actor
- November 29
  - Hayabusa, Japanese professional wrestler (d. 2016)
  - Jonathan Knight, American singer
- November 30 – Rica Matsumoto, Japanese actress, voice actress and singer

=== December ===
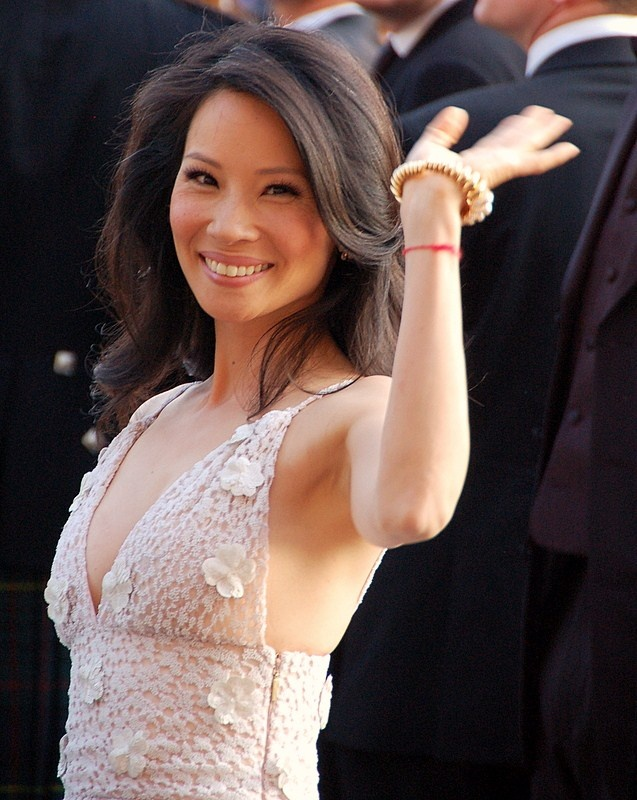
Lucy Liu

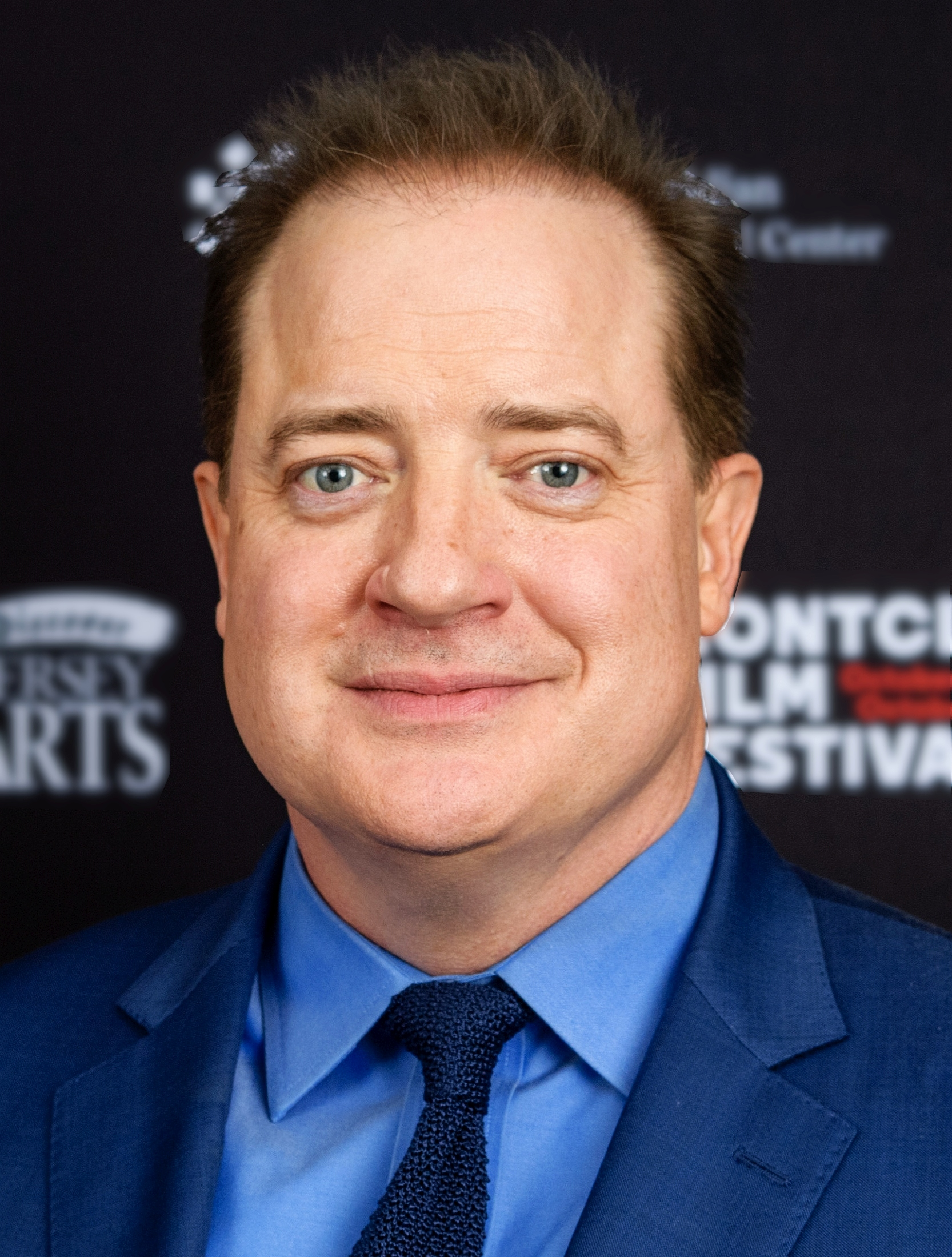
Brendan Fraser

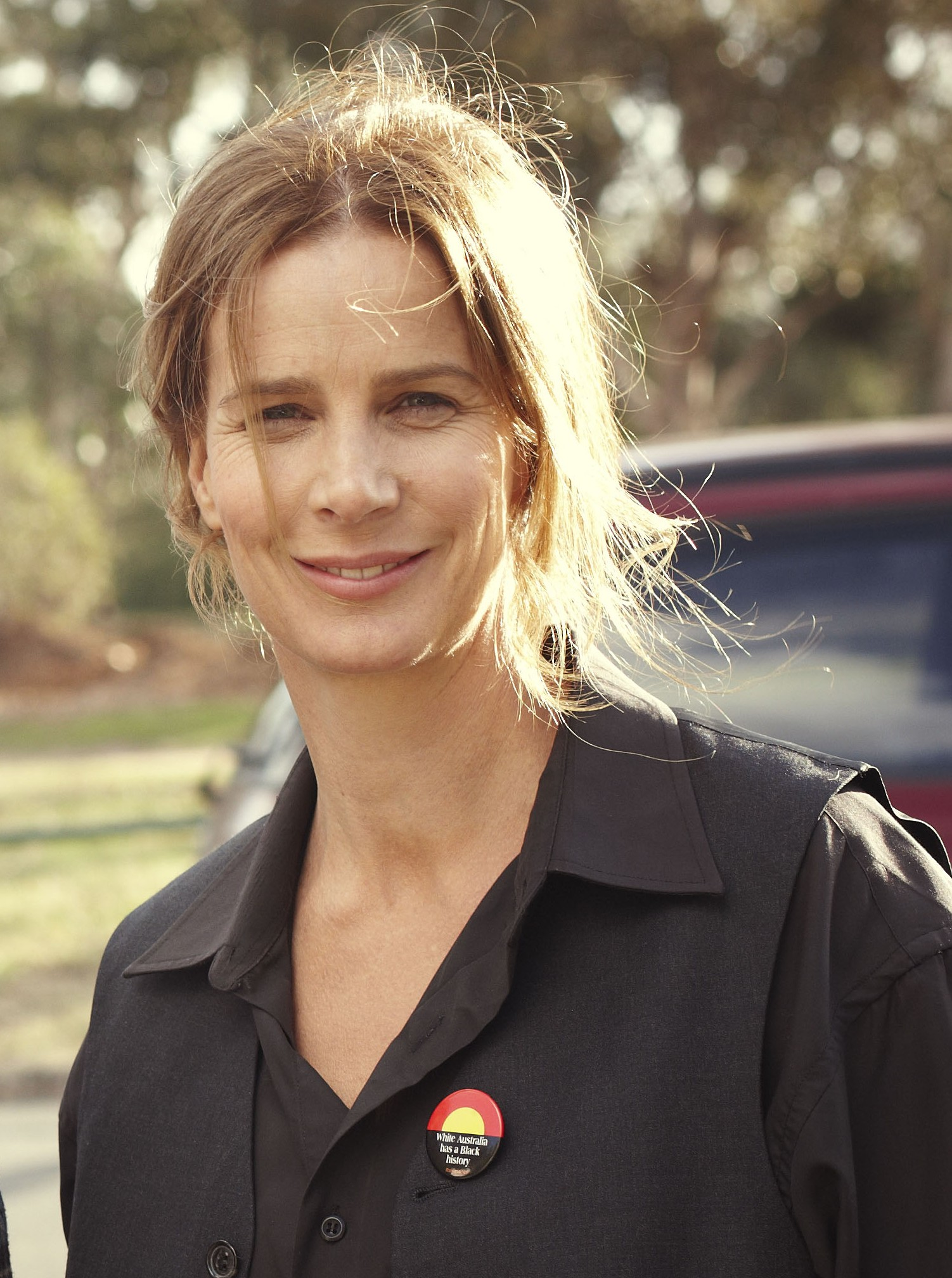
Rachel Griffiths

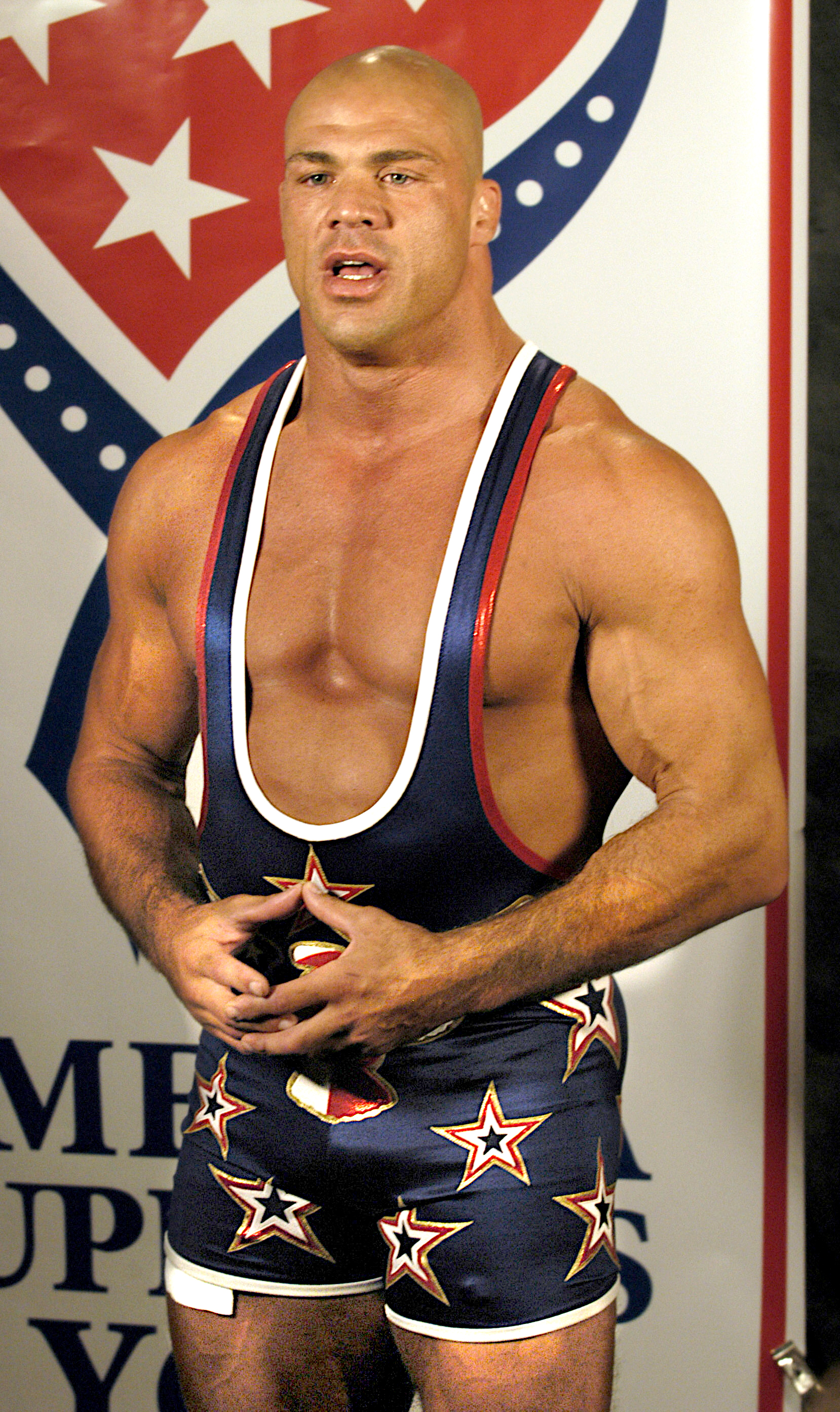
Kurt Angle

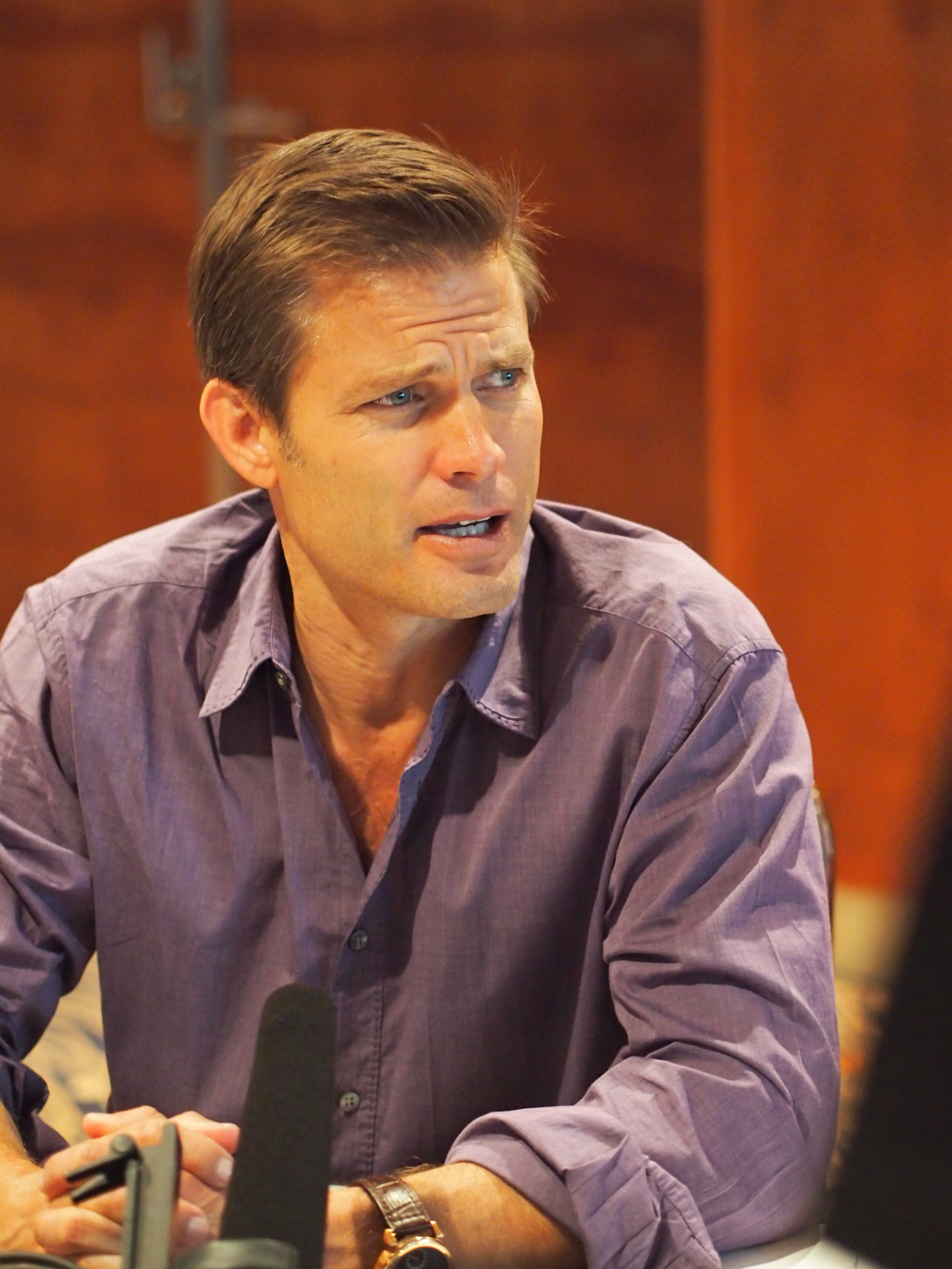
Casper Van Dien

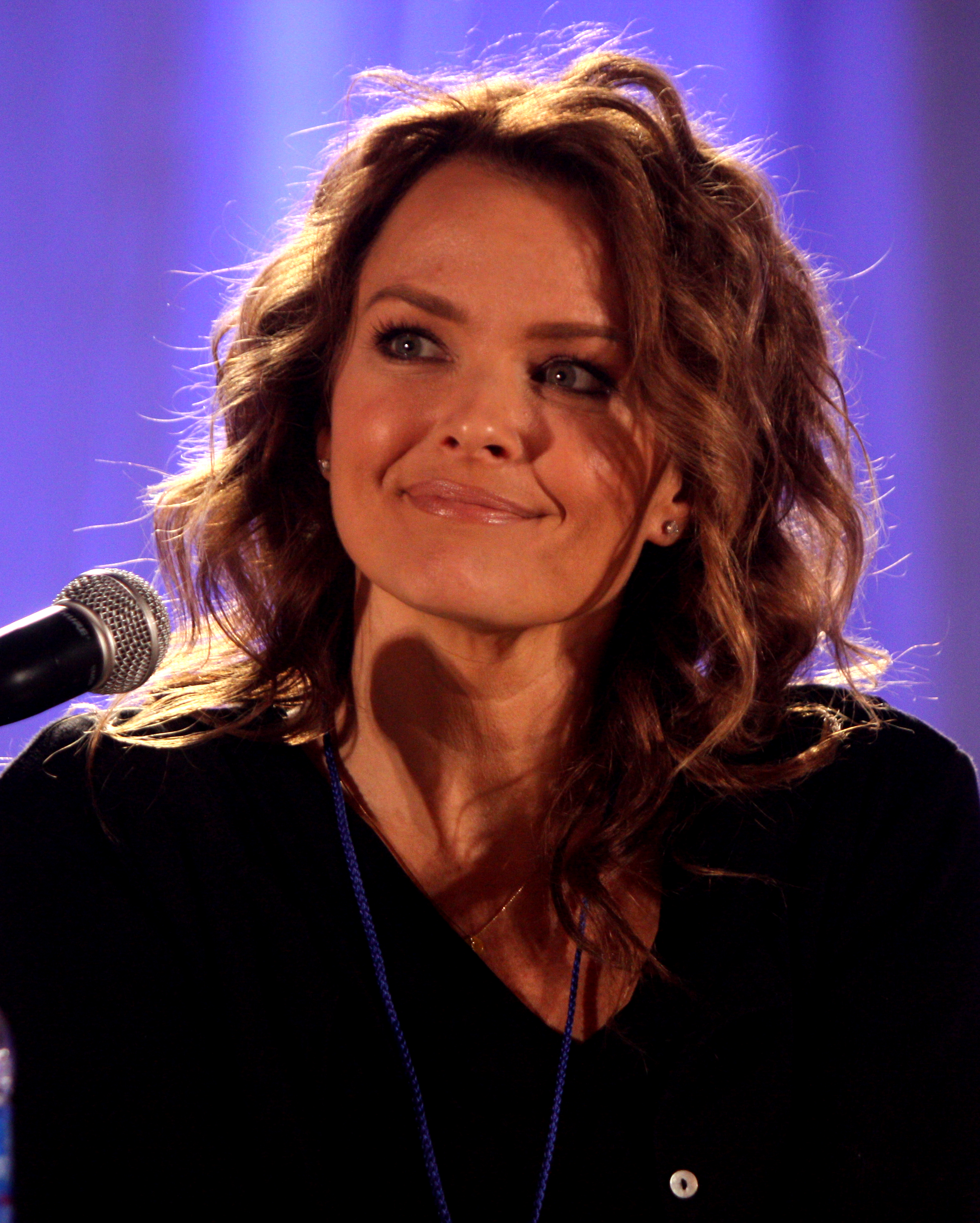
Dina Meyer

- December 2 – Lucy Liu, American actress, voice actress, director, singer, dancer, model and artist
- December 3
  - Brendan Fraser, Canadian-American actor
  - Montell Jordan, American singer
- December 5
  - Margaret Cho, American actress and comedian
  - Wendi Deng Murdoch, Chinese-American entrepreneur and businesswoman
- December 7
  - Mark Geyer, Australian rugby league player
  - David Kabré, Burkinabe military leader and politician
- December 9 – Kurt Angle, American amateur and professional wrestler, 1996 Olympic gold medalist
- December 11
  - Emmanuelle Charpentier, French biochemist, recipient of Nobel Prize in Chemistry
  - Monique Garbrecht-Enfeldt, German speed skater
  - Eula Valdez, Filipino actress
- December 18
  - Casper Van Dien, American actor
  - Rachel Griffiths, Australian actress
- December 19 – Ken Marino, American actor and comedian
- December 20 – Nadia Farès, Moroccan born-French actress
- December 21 – Khrystyne Haje, American actress
- December 22 – Dina Meyer, American actress
- December 23 – Manuel Rivera-Ortiz, American photographer
- December 24 – Choi Jin-sil, South Korean actress and model (d. 2008)
- December 25 – Helena Christensen, Danish model
- December 28 – Lior Ashkenazi, Israeli actor
- December 30 – Fabrice Guy, French Olympic skier

=== Unknown date ===
- Eleonora Requena, Venezuelan poet.
- Isadora Zubillaga, Venezuelan diplomat and activist.

== Deaths ==
=== January ===
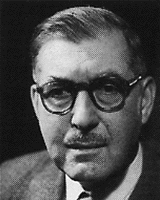
Karl Kobelt

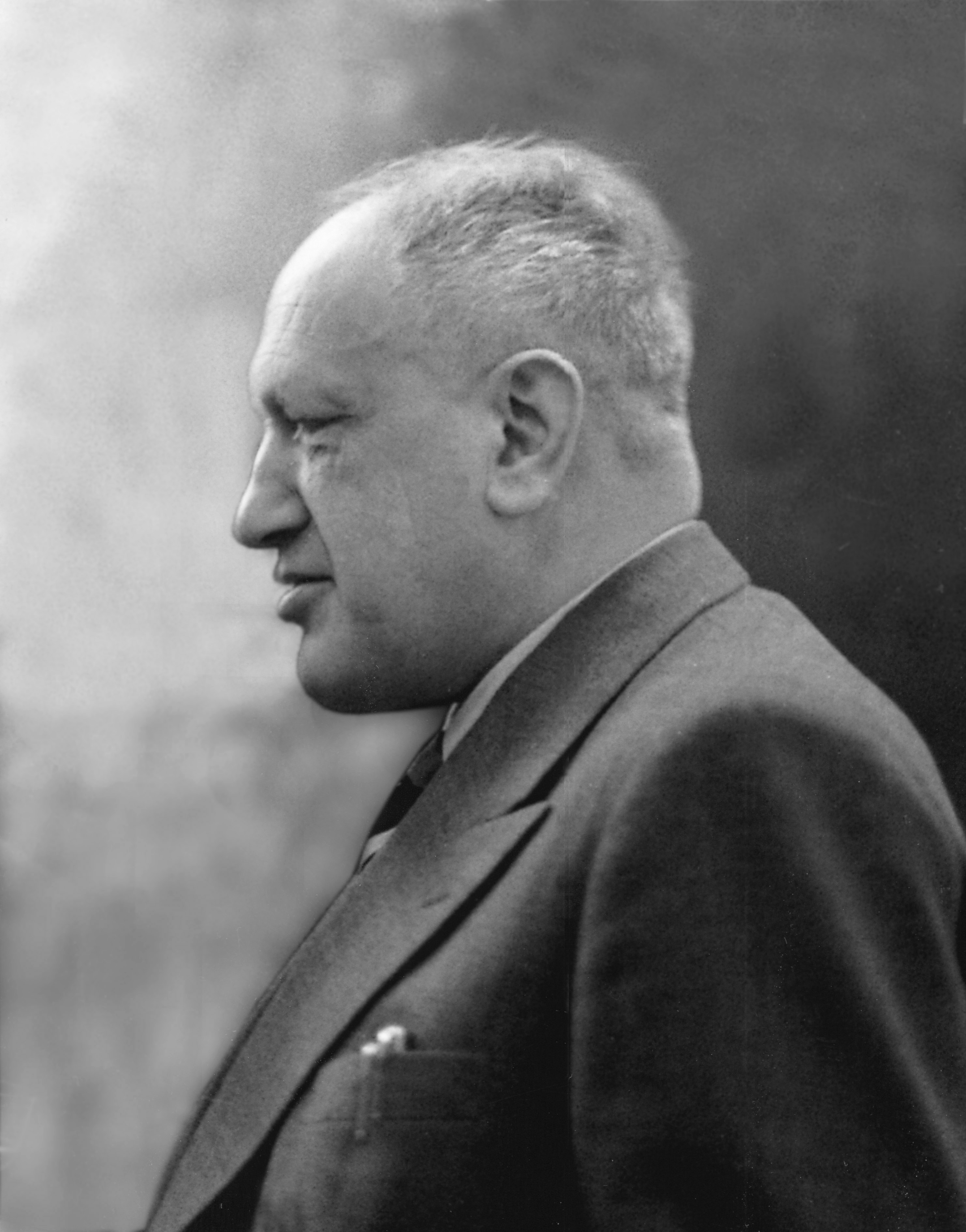
Leopold Infeld

- January 4
  - Armando Castellazzi, Italian footballer and manager (b. 1904)
  - Joseph Pholien, Belgian politician, 37th Prime Minister of Belgium (b. 1884)
- January 6 – Karl Kobelt, 2-time President of the Swiss Confederation (b. 1891)
- January 7
  - Gholamreza Takhti, Iranian wrestler (b. 1930)
  - Mario Roatta, Italian general (b. 1887)
- January 9 – Kōkichi Tsuburaya, Japanese athlete (b. 1940)
- January 10
  - Ali Fuat Cebesoy, Turkish politician (b. 1882)
  - Eben Dönges, acting Prime Minister of South Africa and elected President of South Africa (b. 1898)
- January 15 – Leopold Infeld, Polish physicist (b. 1898)
- January 16 – Bob Jones Sr., American evangelist, religious broadcaster and founder of Bob Jones University (b. 1883)
- January 18 – John Ridgely, American actor (b. 1909)
- January 21 – Georg Dertinger, German politician (b. 1902)
- January 22
  - Aleksandr Arbuzov, Russian chemist (b. 1877)
  - Duke Kahanamoku, American Olympic swimmer (b. 1890)
- January 29 – Tsuguharu Foujita, Japanese-French painter and printmaker (b. 1886)

=== February ===
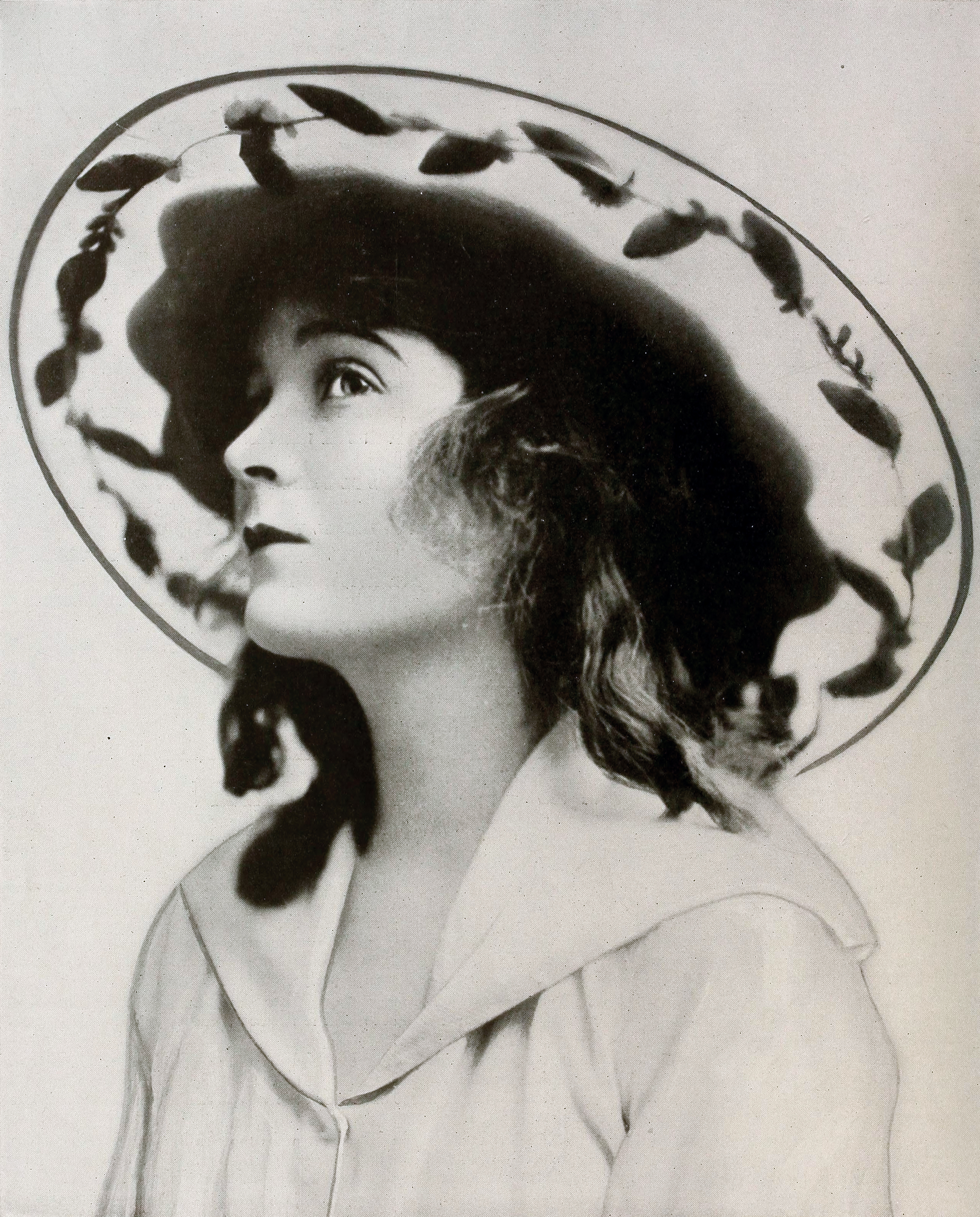
Mae Marsh

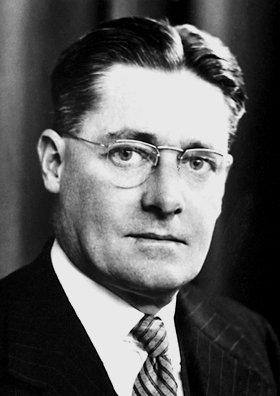
Howard Florey

- February 4
  - Eddie Baker, American actor (b. 1897)
  - Neal Cassady, American author and poet (b. 1926)
- February 7 – Nick Adams, American actor (b. 1931)
- February 10 – Pitirim Sorokin, Russian-born American sociologist (b. 1889)
- February 11 – Howard Lindsay, American playwright (b. 1888)
- February 13
  - Mae Marsh, American actress (b. 1894)
  - Ildebrando Pizzetti, Italian composer (b. 1880)
  - Portia White, Canadian opera singer (b. 1911)
- February 15 – Little Walter, American blues musician and singer-songwriter (b. 1930)
- February 17 – Sir Donald Wolfit, English actor (b. 1902)
- February 19 – Georg Hackenschmidt, German strongman and professional wrestler (b. 1877)
- February 20 – Anthony Asquith, British film director and writer (b. 1902)
- February 21 – Howard Florey, Australian-born pharmacologist, recipient of the Nobel Prize for Physiology or Medicine (b. 1898)
- February 22 – Peter Arno, American cartoonist (b. 1904)
- February 25 – Camille Huysmans, Belgian politician, 34th Prime Minister of Belgium (b. 1871)
- February 27
  - Frankie Lymon, American singer (b. 1942)
  - Hertha Sponer, German physicist and chemist (b. 1895)
- February 29 – Hugo Benioff, American seismologist (b. 1899)

=== March ===
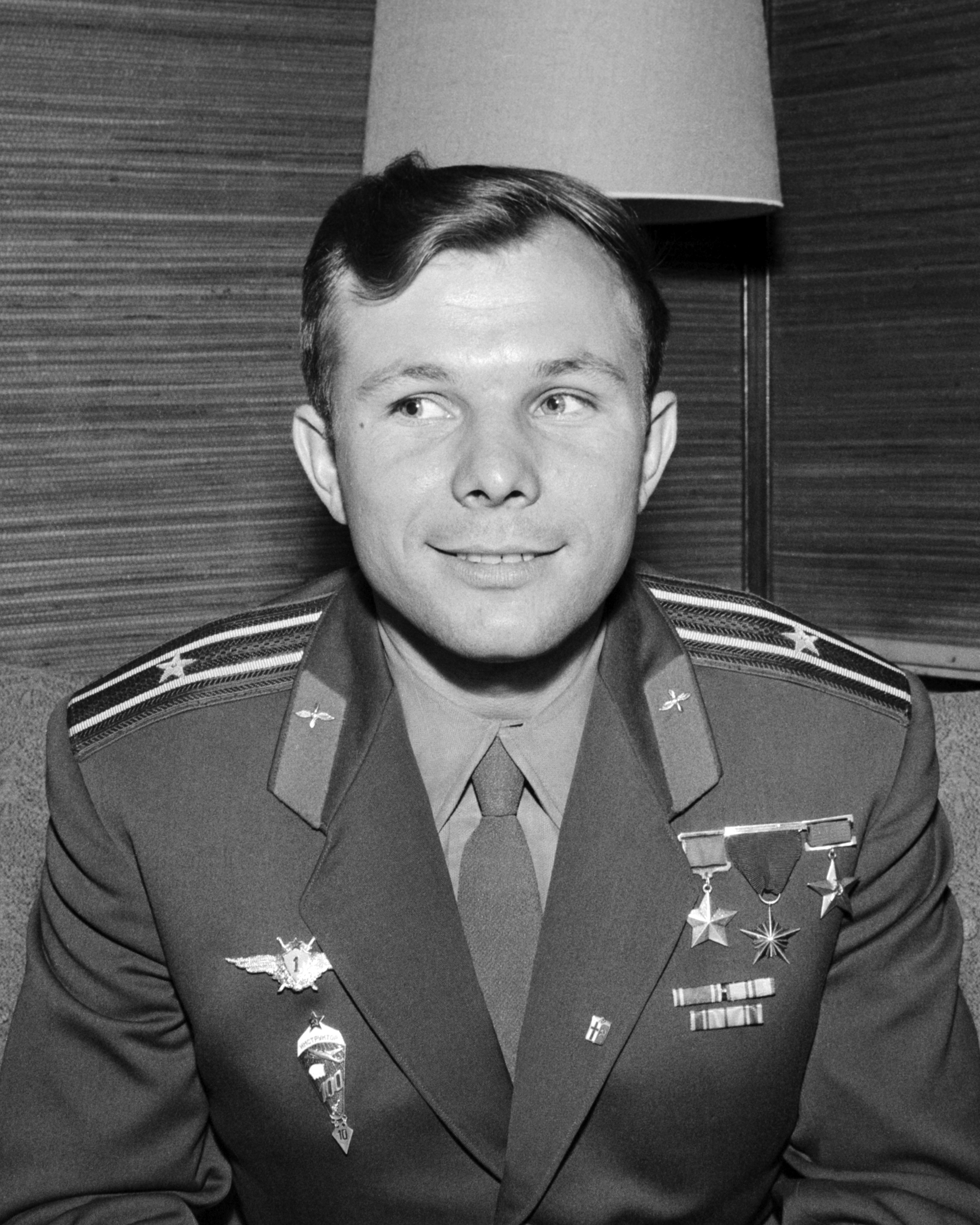
Yuri Gagarin

- March 6 – Joseph W. Martin Jr., American politician (b. 1884)
- March 8 – Jerzy Braun, Polish athlete (b. 1911)
- March 14 – Erwin Panofsky, German-Jewish art historian (b. 1892)
- March 15 – Khuang Aphaiwong, 4th Prime Minister of Thailand, country leader during World War II (b. 1902)
- March 16 – Mario Castelnuovo-Tedesco, Italian composer (b. 1895)
- March 20 – Carl Theodor Dreyer, Danish film director (b. 1889)
- March 23 – Edwin O'Connor, American journalist, novelist and radio commentator (b. 1918)
- March 24 – Alice Guy-Blaché, French filmmaker (b. 1873)
- March 27 – Yuri Gagarin, Soviet cosmonaut, first human in space (b. 1934)
- March 30 – Bobby Driscoll, American child actor (b. 1937)

=== April ===
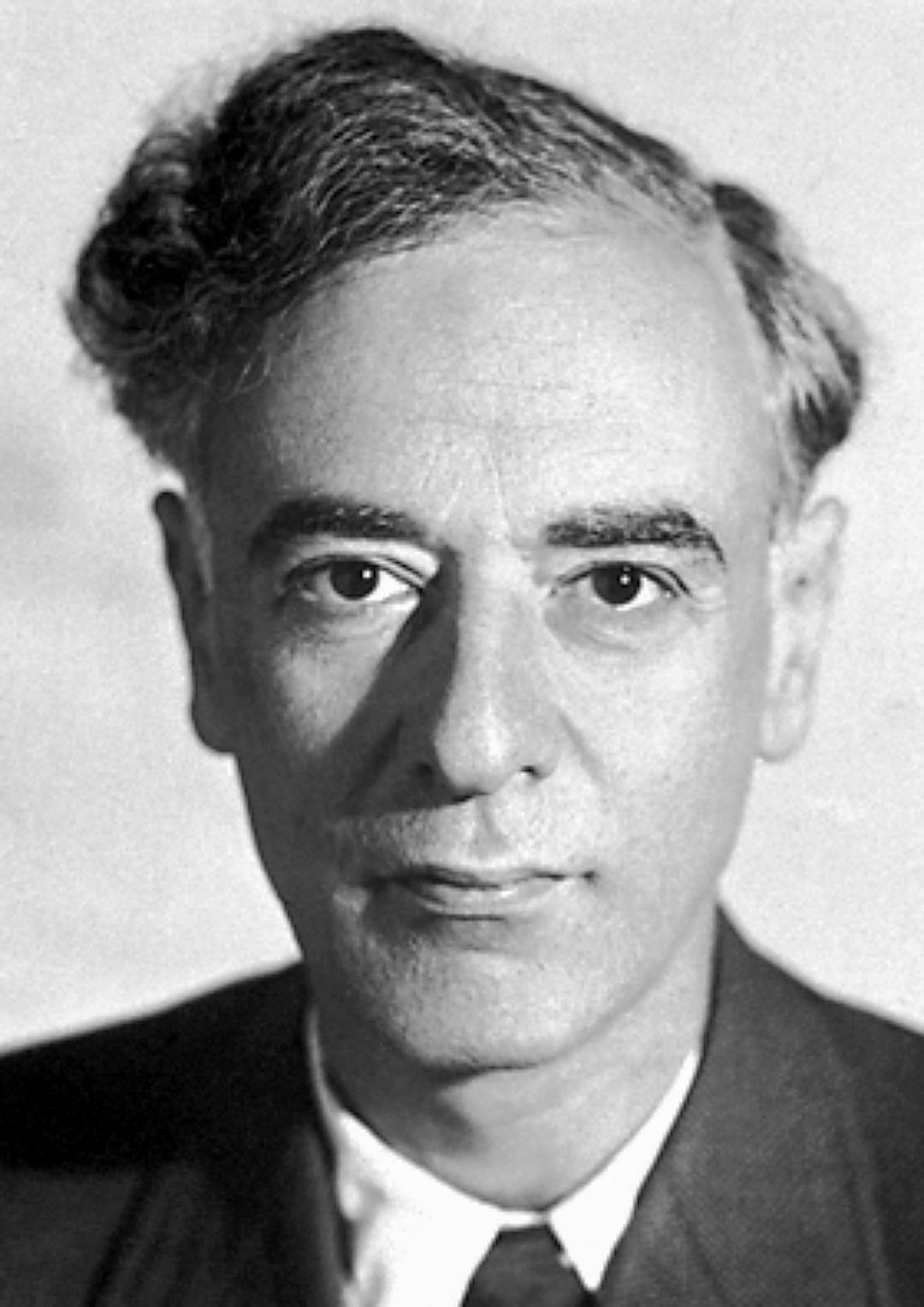
Lev Landau

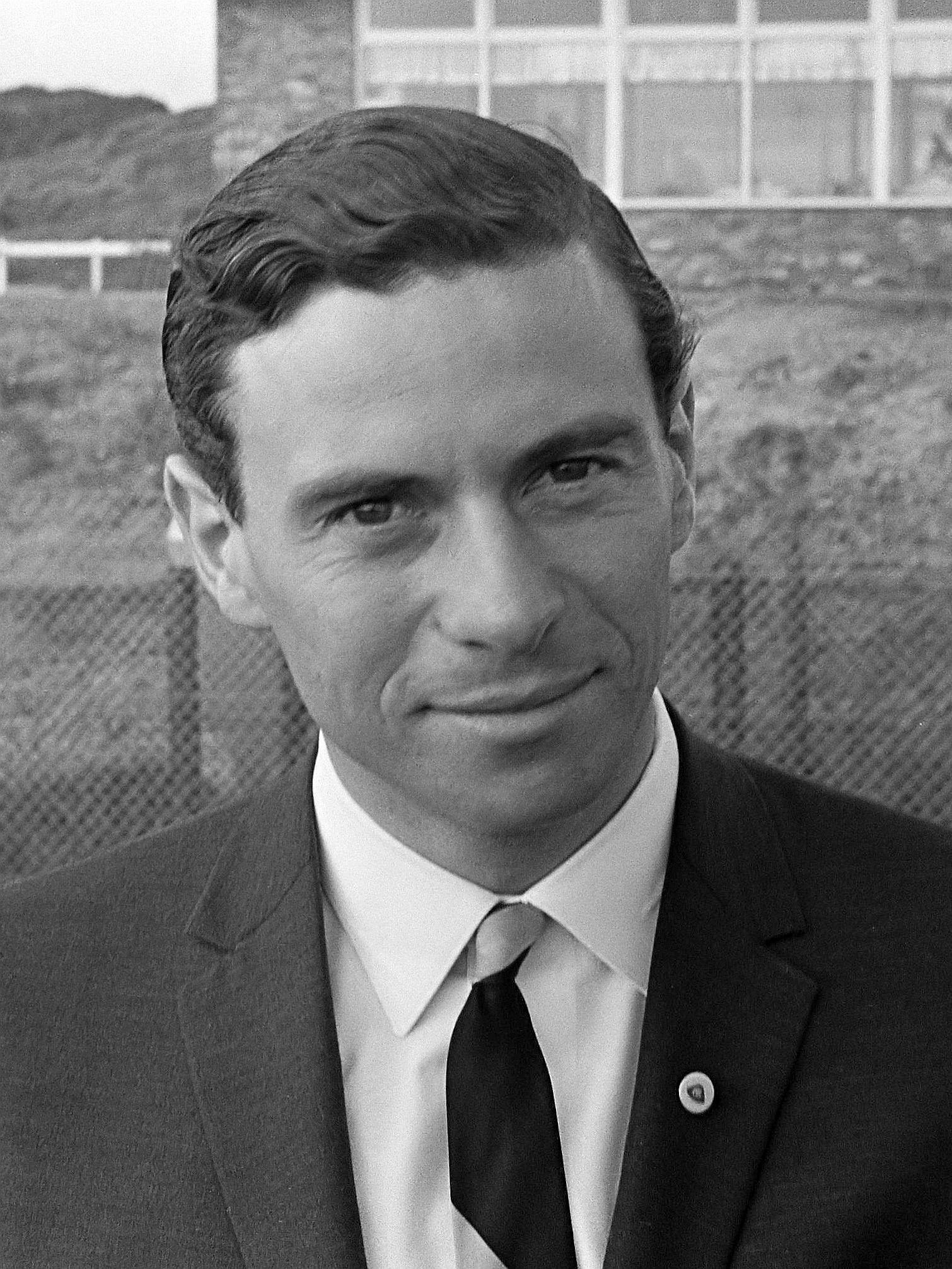
Jim Clark

- April 1 – Lev Landau, Russian physicist, Nobel Prize laureate (b. 1908)
- April 4
  - Martin Luther King Jr., American civil rights leader, recipient of the Nobel Peace Prize (b. 1929)
  - Assis Chateaubriand, Brazilian newspaper magnate (b. 1892)
- April 7 – Jim Clark, Scottish racing driver and double Formula One World Champion (b. 1936)
- April 12 – Heinrich Nordhoff, German automotive engineer (b. 1899)
- April 15 – Boris Lyatoshinsky, Ukrainian composer, conductor and teacher (b. 1895)
- April 16
  - Fay Bainter, American actress (b. 1893)
  - Albert Betz, German physicist (b. 1885)
  - Edna Ferber, American writer (b. 1885)
- April 20 – Soraya Tarzi, Afghan queen (b. 1899)
- April 24
  - Tommy Noonan, American actor (b. 1921)
  - Walter Tewksbury, American athlete (b. 1876)
- April 26 – John Heartfield, German visual artist (b. 1891)
- April 28 – Raoul Abatchou, Central African politician and mining operator (b. 1926)

=== May ===
- May 5 – Albert Dekker, American actor (b. 1905)
- May 7 – Lurleen Wallace, American politician (b. 1926)
- May 9
  - Finlay Currie, Scottish actor (b. 1878)
  - Mercedes de Acosta, American poet, playwright and novelist (b. 1892)
  - Marion Lorne, American actress (b. 1883)
- May 10 – Scotty Beckett, American child actor (b. 1929)
- May 11 – Robert Burks, American cinematographer (b. 1909)
- May 14 – Husband E. Kimmel, American admiral (b. 1882)
- May 23 – Franco Riccardi, Italian fencer, Olympic champion (b. 1905)
- May 25 – Georg von Küchler, German field marshal and war criminal (b. 1881)
- May 26 – Little Willie John, American R&B singer (b. 1937)
- May 28
  - Kees van Dongen, Dutch-French painter (b. 1877)
  - Fyodor Okhlopkov, Soviet sniper (b. 1908)

=== June ===
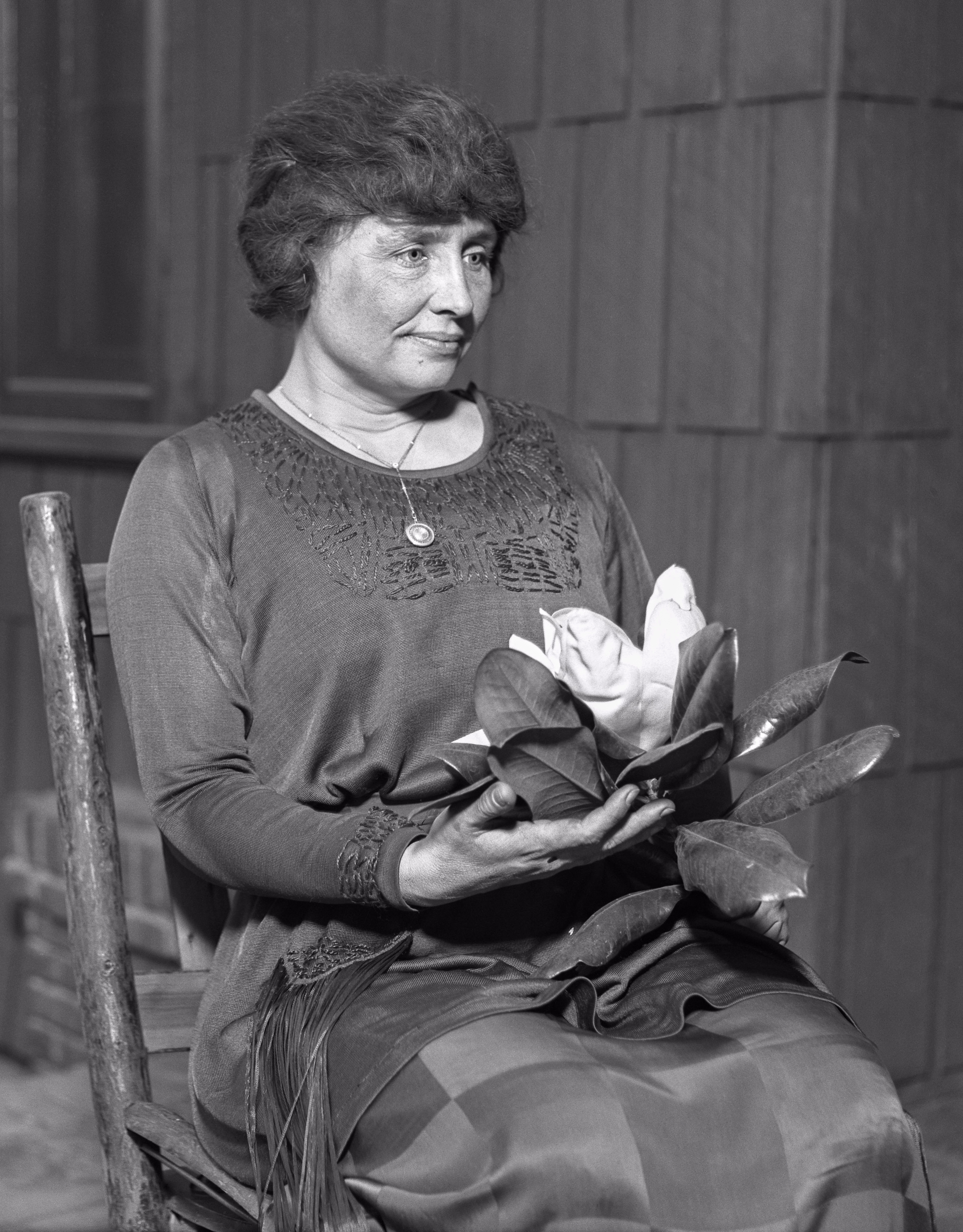
Helen Keller

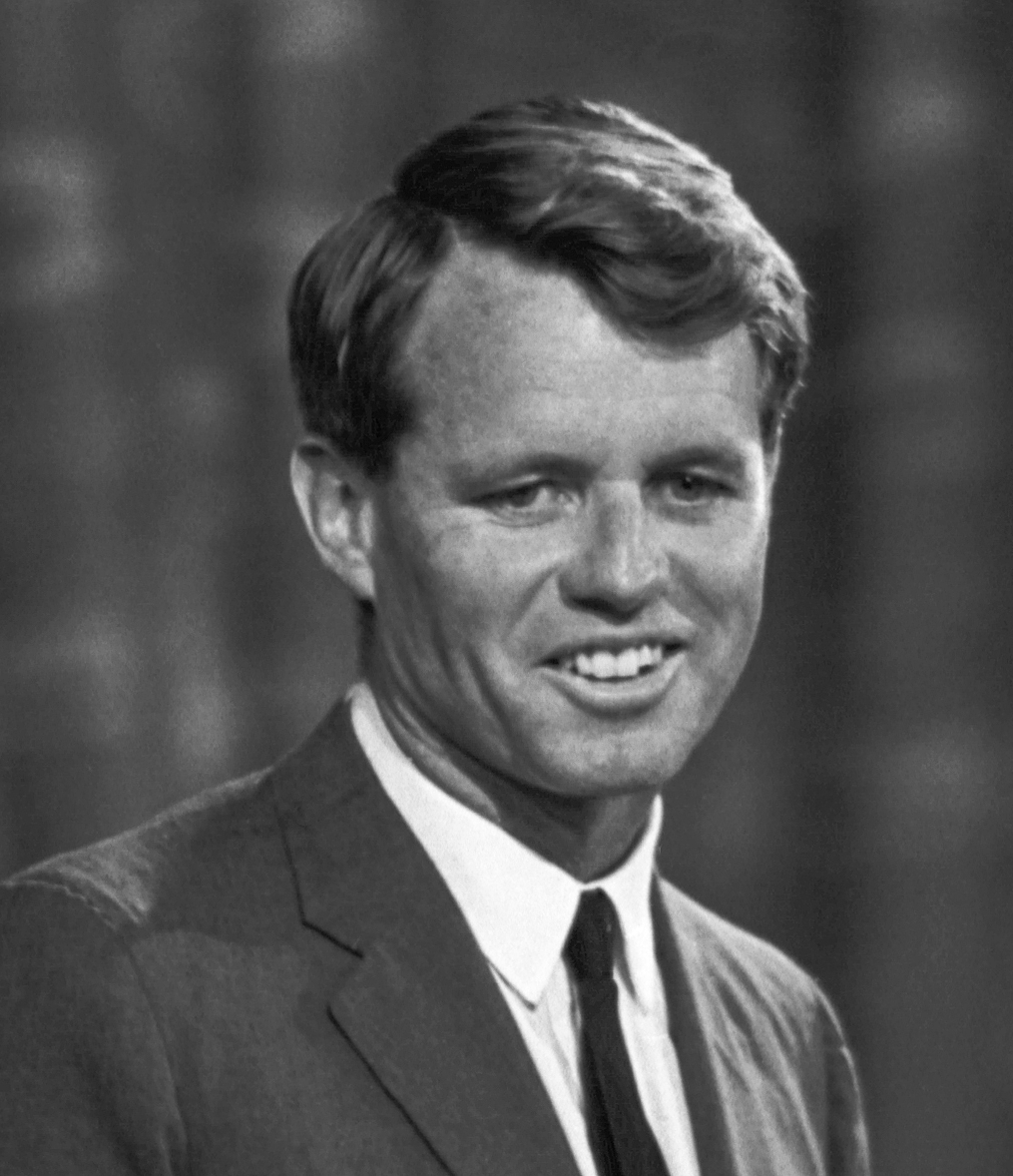
Robert F. Kennedy

- June 1 – Helen Keller, American activist and spokeswoman for the deaf and blind (b. 1880)
- June 2 – R. Norris Williams, American tennis player (b. 1891)
- June 4
  - Dorothy Gish, American actress (b. 1898)
  - Sir Walter Nash, 27th Prime Minister of New Zealand (b. 1882)
- June 6
  - Randolph Churchill, British politician, son of Winston Churchill (b. 1911)
  - Robert F. Kennedy, American lawyer, politician (United States Senator, U.S. Attorney General) and a leading 1968 Democratic presidential candidate (b. 1925)
- June 7 – Dan Duryea, American actor (b. 1907)
- June 8 – Ludovico Scarfiotti, Italian racing driver (b. 1933)
- June 14
  - Karl-Birger Blomdahl, Swedish composer (b. 1916)
  - Salvatore Quasimodo, Italian writer, Nobel Prize laureate (b. 1901)
  - Ernest Stoneman, American country music artist (b. 1893)
- June 15
  - Sam Crawford, American baseball player (b. 1880)
  - Wes Montgomery, American jazz guitarist (b. 1923)
- June 17 – José Nasazzi, Uruguayan footballer (b. 1901)
- June 18 – Nikolaus von Falkenhorst, German general and war criminal (b. 1885)
- June 25 – Tony Hancock, English comedian and actor (b. 1924)

=== July ===
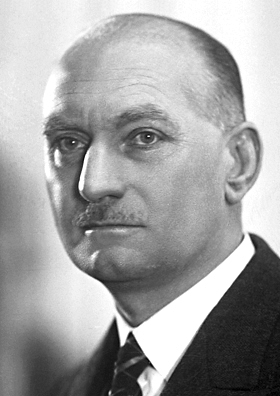
Corneille Heymans

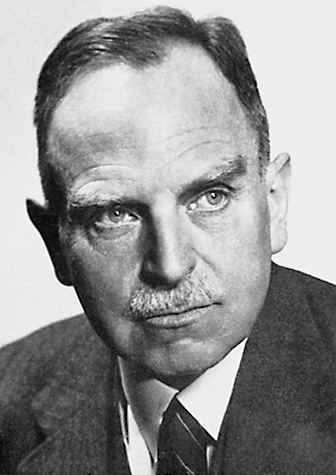
Otto Hahn

- July 1
  - Fritz Bauer, German judge and prosecutor (b. 1903)
  - Virginia Weidler, American actress (b. 1927)
- July 2
  - Zaki al-Arsuzi, Syrian philosopher, philologist, sociologist and historian (b. 1899)
  - Francis Brennan, American cardinal (b. 1894)
- July 7 – Jo Schlesser, French racing driver (b. 1928)
- July 9 – Alexander Cadogan, British diplomat (b. 1884)
- July 12 – José Bordas Valdez, 43rd President of the Dominican Republic (b. 1874)
- July 13 – Ilias Tsirimokos, Prime Minister of Greece (b. 1907)
- July 14 – Konstantin Paustovsky, Russian-Soviet writer (b. 1892)
- July 15 – Cai Chusheng, Chinese film director (b. 1906)
- July 18 – Corneille Heymans, Belgian physiologist, Nobel Prize laureate (b. 1892)
- July 20 – Joseph Keilberth, German conductor (b. 1908)
- July 21 – Ruth St. Denis, American dancer (b. 1879)
- July 22 – Giovannino Guareschi, Italian journalist (b. 1908)
- July 23
  - Luigi Cevenini, Italian footballer and coach (b. 1895)
  - Sir Henry Dale, English pharmacologist and physiologist (b. 1875)
- July 27 – Lilian Harvey, Anglo-German actress and singer (b. 1906)
- July 28
  - Otto Hahn, German chemist, discoverer of nuclear fission, Nobel Prize laureate (b. 1879)
  - Ángel Herrera Oria, Spanish journalist, politician, cardinal and servant of God (b. 1886)

=== August ===
- August 3 – Konstantin Rokossovsky, Soviet officer, Marshal of the Soviet Union (b. 1896)
- August 5 – Luther Perkins, American guitarist (b. 1928)
- August 10 – Ratna Asmara, Indonesian actress and director (b. 1913)
- August 19 – George Gamow, Soviet-American theoretical physicist and cosmologist (b. 1904)
- August 25 – Stan McCabe, Australian cricketer (b. 1910)
- August 26 – Kay Francis, American actress (b. 1905)
- August 27
  - Robert Z. Leonard, American film director (b. 1889)
  - Princess Marina of Greece and Denmark (b. 1906)
- August 29 – Ulysses S. Grant III, American soldier and planner (b. 1881)
- August 30 – William Talman, American actor (b. 1915)
- August 31 – Dennis O'Keefe, American actor (b. 1908)

=== September ===
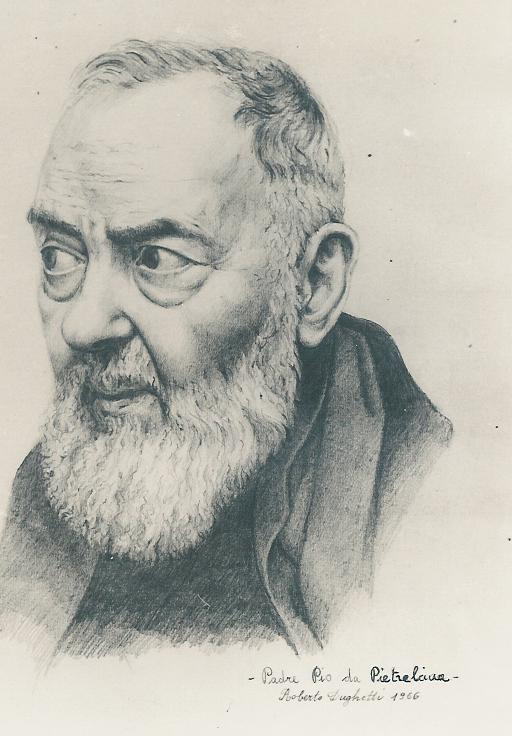
Saint Pio of Pietrelcina

- September 3 – Juan José Castro, Argentine composer and conductor (b. 1895)
- September 7 – Lucio Fontana, Italian painter and sculptor (b. 1899)
- September 13 – Frank Barson, English footballer (b. 1891)
- September 17 – Armand Blanchonnet, French Olympic cyclist (b. 1903)
- September 18
  - Franchot Tone, American actor (b. 1905)
  - Francis McDonald, American actor (b. 1891)
- September 19
  - Chester Carlson, American physicist and inventor (b. 1906)
  - Red Foley, American singer (b. 1910)
- September 23 – Padre Pio, Italian Roman Catholic priest and saint (b. 1887)
- September 24 – Virginia Valli, American actress (b. 1898)
- September 28 – Sir Norman Brookes, Australian tennis champion (b. 1877)

=== October ===
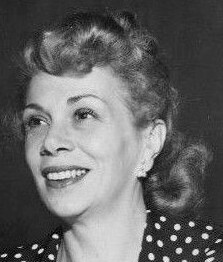
Bea Benaderet

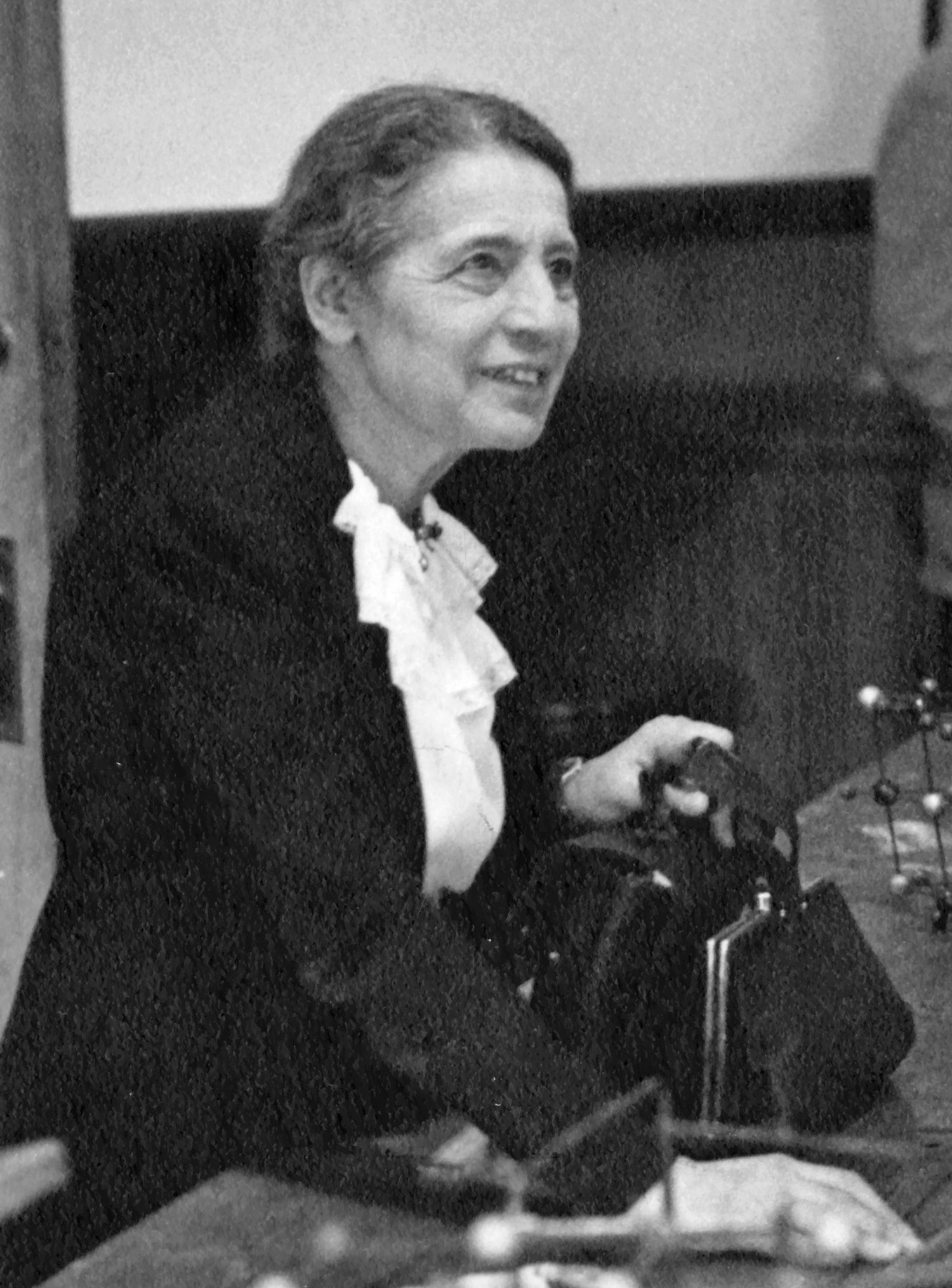
Lise Meitner

- October 1 – Romano Guardini, Italian-German Catholic priest and theologian (b. 1885)
- October 2 – Marcel Duchamp, French artist (b. 1887)
- October 4
  - Francis Biddle, American politician (b. 1886)
  - Hitoshi Imamura, Japanese general (b. 1886)
- October 13
  - Manuel Bandeira, Brazilian poet, literary critic and translator (b. 1886)
  - Bea Benaderet, American actress (b. 1906)
- October 15
  - Franz Beyer, German general (b. 1892)
  - Herbert Copeland, American biologist (b. 1902)
- October 18 – Lee Tracy, American actor (b. 1898)
- October 20 – Bud Flanagan, British entertainer and comedian (b. 1896)
- October 26 – Sergei Bernstein, Russian and Soviet mathematician (b. 1880)
- October 27 – Lise Meitner, German-Austrian physicist, discoverer of nuclear fission (b. 1878)
- October 28 – Hans Cramer, German general (b. 1896)
- October 30
  - Rose Wilder Lane, American author (b. 1886)
  - Ramon Novarro, Mexican-born American actor (b. 1899)
  - Conrad Richter, American writer (b. 1890)

=== November ===
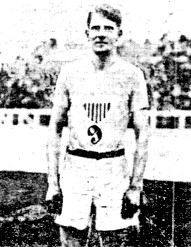
Charles Bacon

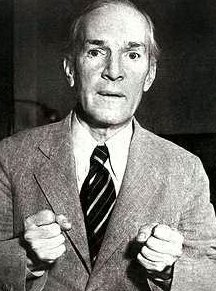
Upton Sinclair

- November 1 – Georgios Papandreou, 3-time Prime Minister of Greece (b. 1888)
- November 6 – Charles Munch, French conductor (b. 1891)
- November 7 – Alexander Gelfond, Soviet mathematician (b. 1906)
- November 8 – Wendell Corey, American actor (b. 1914)
- November 9
  - Jan Johansson, Swedish jazz pianist (b. 1931)
  - Gerald Mohr, American actor (b. 1914)
- November 11 – Jeanne Demessieux, French composer (b. 1921)
- November 14 – Ramón Menéndez Pidal, Spanish philologist and historian (b. 1869)
- November 15 – Charles Bacon, American athlete (b. 1885)
- November 16
  - Augustin Bea, German cardinal (b. 1881)
  - Carl Bertilsson, Swedish gymnast (b. 1889)
- November 17
  - Abdul Wahed Bokainagari, Bengali politician (b. 1876)
  - Mervyn Peake, English writer, artist, poet and illustrator (b. 1911)
- November 18 – Walter Wanger, American film producer (b. 1894)
- November 20 – Helen Gardner, American actress (b. 1884)
- November 24 – István Dobi, prime minister of Hungary (b. 1898)
- November 25 – Upton Sinclair, American writer (b. 1878)
- November 26 – Arnold Zweig, German writer, pacifist and socialist (b. 1887)
- November 28 – Enid Blyton, English writer (b. 1897)
- November 30 – Charles Henry Bartlett, British cyclist (b. 1885)

=== December ===
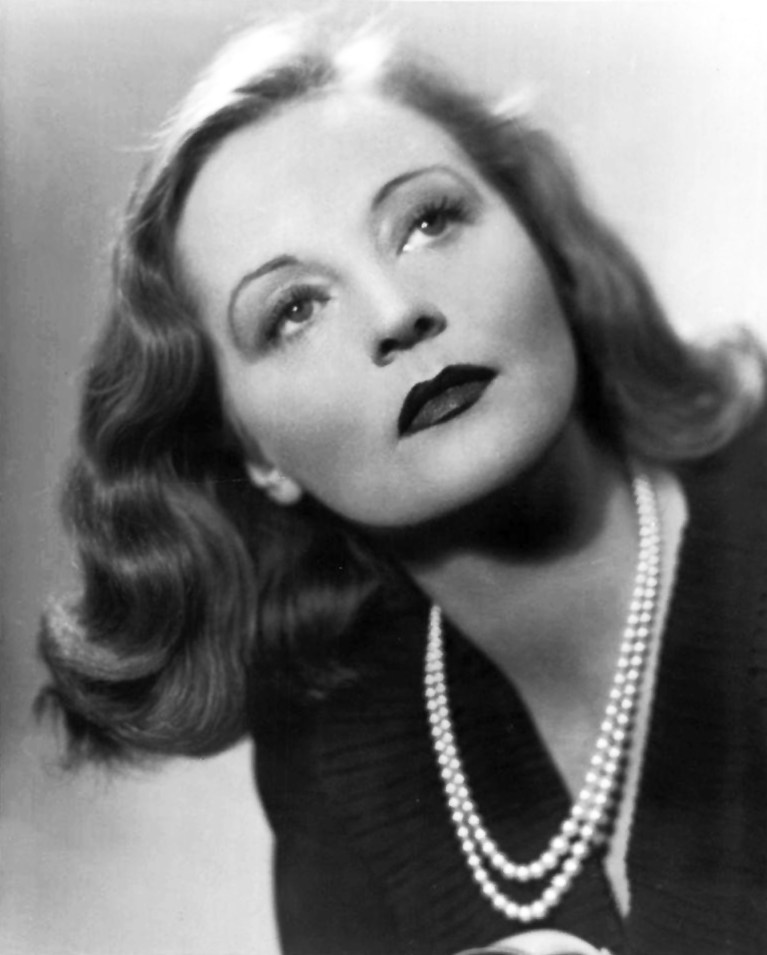
Tallulah Bankhead

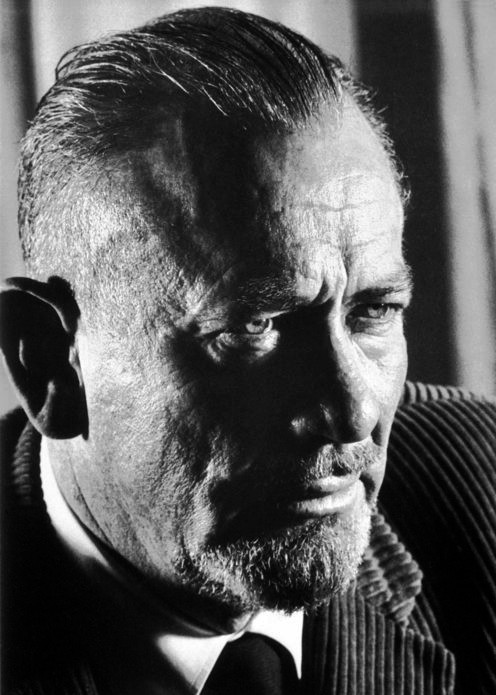
John Steinbeck

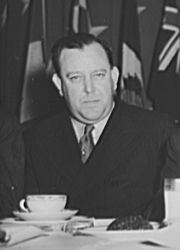
Trygve Lie

- December 1
  - Hugo Haas, Czech actor, director and writer (b. 1901)
  - Darío Moreno, Turkish-Jewish polyglot singer, composer, lyricist and guitarist (b. 1921)
- December 4 – Archie Mayo, American actor and director (b. 1891)
- December 5 – Fred Clark, American actor (b. 1914)
- December 9 – Enoch L. Johnson, American political boss and racketeer (b. 1883)
- December 10
  - Karl Barth, German Protestant theologian (b. 1886)
  - Thomas Merton, American author (b. 1915)
- December 12
  - Tim Ahearne, Irish athlete (b. 1885)
  - Tallulah Bankhead, American actress (b. 1902)
- December 14 – Dorothy Payne Whitney, American-born philanthropist, social activist (b. 1887)
- December 18 – Giovanni Messe, Italian field marshal and politician (b. 1883)
- December 19 – Norman Thomas, American socialist (b. 1884)
- December 20
  - Max Brod, Czech-born Israeli composer, writer and biographer (b. 1884)
  - John Steinbeck, American writer, Nobel Prize laureate (b. 1902)
- December 21 – Vittorio Pozzo, Italian football player and manager (b. 1886)
- December 30
  - Augustus Agar, British naval officer, Victoria Cross recipient (b. 1890)
  - Trygve Lie, Norwegian politician, 1st Secretary General of the United Nations (b. 1896)
  - Bill Tytla, Ukrainian-born American animator (b. 1904)
  - Kirill Meretskov, Soviet military officer, Marshal of the Soviet Union (b. 1897)
- December 31 – George Lewis, American musician (b. 1900)

=== Date unknown ===
- Sami Solh, 5-Time Prime Minister of Lebanon (b. 1887)

== Nobel Prizes ==

- Physics – Luis Walter Alvarez
- Chemistry – Lars Onsager
- Physiology or Medicine – Robert W. Holley, Har Gobind Khorana, Marshall W. Nirenberg
- Literature – Yasunari Kawabata
- Peace – René Cassin
