= Perfect Time of Day =

Single by Howie Day

from the album Stop All the World Now
- Released: August 18, 2003
- Recorded: 2003
- Studio: Olympic Studios (London, UK)
- Genre: Pop rock; indie rock
- Length: 4:21
- Label: Epic
- Songwriters: Howie Day; Kevin Griffin
- Producer: Youth

Howie Day singles chronology
"Sorry So Sorry" (2002)	"Perfect Time of Day" (2003)	"She Says" (2004)

Music video
- "Perfect Time of Day" on YouTube

"Perfect Time of Day" is a song by American singer-songwriter Howie Day, taken from his second studio album Stop All the World Now (2003). The track was written by Day and Kevin Griffin, lead singer of Better Than Ezra; it was one of the three tracks the two wrote together that were included on the album. The track was produced by Martin Glover, better known by his stage name Youth. A pop rock and indie rock song about self motivation, it was released on August 18, 2003, via Epic Records to triple-A radio as the lead single from the album.

Day would gain his biggest success on the adult album alternative charts with "Perfect Time of Day", topping the US Billboard Adult Alternative Airplay chart for one week on December 27, 2003. It also became a minor top-25 hit on the Adult Pop Airplay chart, becoming his first entry on that chart.

== Critical reception ==
Laurence J. Freedman of The Michigan Daily said it recalled the sound of U2 writing, "Its sweeping sound punctuated by the pounding of a bass drum under textured guitars." Nate Gibb of the Lewiston Morning Tribune described the track as a "driving ballad".

== Music video ==
Chris Mills directed the music video for "Perfect Time of Day". The video features Day recording the song in a studio with a band with cutscenes featuring footage of people doing different things like skateboarding and painting. It was released on October 5, 2003, to MTV2, and was shown on MTV's Buzzworthy and VH-1's "Inside Track" programs.

== Personnel ==
Taken from the promotional single liner notes.

- Simon Jones – bass
- Laurie Jenkins – drums
- Jay Clifford – guitar
- Les Hall – keyboards, piano
- Howie Day and Kevin Griffin – music and lyrics
- Martin "Youth" Glover – producer
- Howie Day – vocals, guitar

== Charts ==
=== Weekly charts ===
Weekly chart performance for "Perfect Time of Day"
Chart (2003–2004)	Peak position
US Adult Alternative Airplay (Billboard)	1
US Adult Pop Airplay (Billboard)	21
US Hot AC (Radio & Records)	22
US Triple-A (Radio & Records)	1
US Triple-A Indicator (Radio & Records)	4

=== Year-end charts ===
2003 year-end chart performance for "Perfect Time of Day"
Chart (2003)	Peak position
US Adult Top 40 (Billboard)	95
US Triple-A (Billboard)	37
US Triple-A (Radio & Records)	57
US Triple-A Indicator (Radio & Records)	41

2004 year-end chart performance for "Perfect Time of Day"
Chart (2004)	Peak position
US Adult Top 40 (Billboard)	74
US Triple-A (Billboard)	37
US Hot AC (Radio & Records)	91
US Triple-A (Radio & Records)	49

== Release history ==
Release dates and formats for "Perfect Time of Day"
Region	Date	Format(s)	Label(s)	Ref.
United States	August 18, 2003	Adult album alternative radio	Epic	
United States	September 8, 2003	Hot adult contemporary; alternative radio	Epic	
