= After (band) =

American musical group

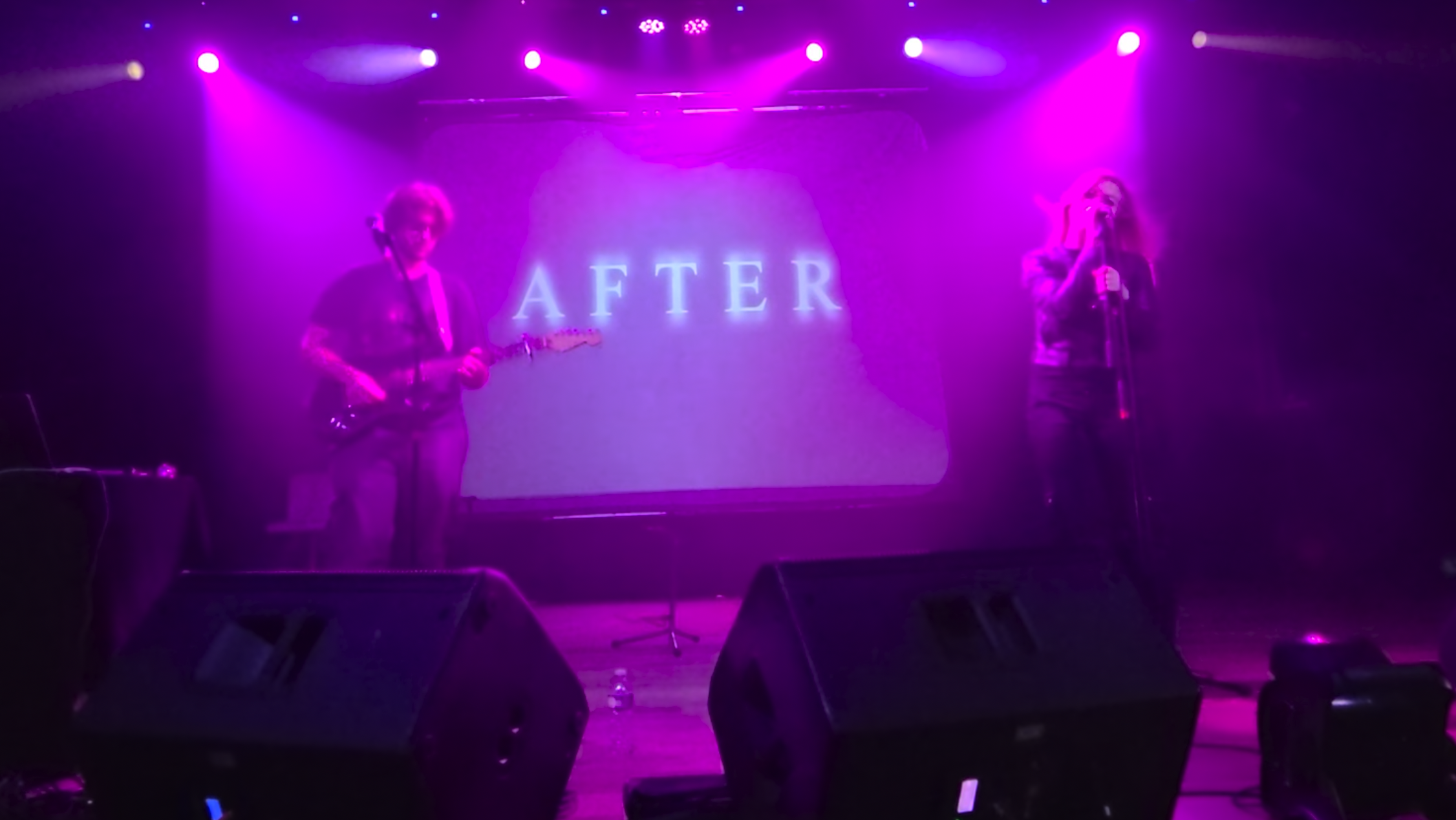
- After performing in 2025

Background information
- Also known as: aftertheband
- Origin: Los Angeles, California, U.S.
- Genres: Synth-pop; pop rock; trip hop; electropop; chillwave; alternative pop
- Years active: 2023–present
- Labels: Mom + Pop; Ultraworld
- Members: Graham Epstein; Justine Dorsey
- Website: www.after.band

After are an American pop duo formed in 2023 in Los Angeles, California, composed of Graham Epstein and Justine Dorsey. After reaching virality with their single "300 Dreams", the duo's debut extended play, After EP, was released in 2025, followed by their second EP, After EP 2. Their debut full-length album, Fell Asleep in the Sun, was released in 2026 through Mom + Pop Music.

== History ==
=== 2023–2024: Beginnings and early releases ===
Graham Epstein and Justine Dorsey formed the duo in 2023 after meeting on the dating app Hinge in 2021, naming the band after the 2003 visual novel After.... Before forming the duo, Epstein was in a shoegaze band from his middle school, and Dorsey created projects inspired by groups like Blondie and Talking Heads.

They debuted in 2023 with the single, "Something Special", followed by "In a City Called Garden" and "The Dove", released later that year.

=== 2024–2025: After EP and After EP 2 ===
On March 5, 2024, After released the single "Obvious", followed by "The Element" on July 2, 2024 and "Everyday's a Blessing On This Bitchass Earth" on September 13, 2024, with the latter being in collaboration with the artists Photographic Memory and Darcy Baylis. The duo also released "The Story" on November 12, 2024.

On January 12, 2025, After released the single "Ever", and on March 14, 2025, After released the single "300 Dreams", which later went viral. On April 4, 2025, the band's first extended play, After EP, was released, featuring the singles "Obvious", "Ever" and "300 Dreams" that had first gained them attention. The EP received limited critical reception, with Sydney Brasil of Exclaim giving it a Staff Pick and describing it as "what happens when the cool kids make bubblegum pop".

On June 18, 2025, After released the single "Deep Diving", followed by "Outbound" on August 29, 2025. On October 17, 2025, the duo released their second EP, After EP 2, under the label Mom + Pop Music. The critical reception, however, was mixed; The Fader called the EP's tracks "songs meant to lubricate your brain" and "a mimicry of something that’s so nuanced and studied it becomes its own kind of original", while Pitchfork rated both of the duo's 2025 EPs a combined 4.5/10, calling the EPs "limp and unimaginative rehashes" of the early 2000s and describing them as "pop’s Crystal Pepsi—a gloriously ephemeral product of our memories that came back tasting like absolutely nothing".

=== 2026–present: Fell Asleep in the Sun ===
On January 9, 2026, After released a cover of Cold by the American rock band Crossfade.

On May 6, 2026, After released the single "Promise (When You Go)". On July 15, 2026, the band's first full-length studio album, Fell Asleep in the Sun, was announced, alongside the release of the promotional single "Take Me to Sunrise" and an accompanying music video. Two more promotional singles were released preceding the album, including "Fell Asleep in the Sun" on August 14, 2026 and "Blind" on September 4, 2026. Fell Asleep in the Sun was released on September 18, 2026 under Mom + Pop Music. Critical reception to the album was mixed; Backseat Mafia rated it an 86%, calling the album a "welcome dose of pop sunlight", while Pitchfork rated it 5.8/10, calling it "superficially pretty but frustratingly shallow" and describing its songs as "spoiled by flat lyricism and unfulfilling pop arrangements." The band later embarked on a supporting tour of North America for the album from September to November 2026.

== Inspirations ==
The duo has cited musicians like Ashlee Simpson and Michelle Branch as part of the reason for their formation, alongside bands like Creed and Nickelback. Dorsey has cited the band Coldplay as an influence for the song "300 Dreams" alongside artists like Taylor Swift, The Fray, and Anna Nalick, while Epstein has taken inspiration from Hilary Duff, Robert Miles, Fountains of Wayne, and Sigur Rós in his production process. The duo has also taken inspiration from the Silent Hill series of video games as part of their songwriting process.

== Discography ==
=== Albums ===
Title	Details
Fell Asleep in the Sun	Released: September 18, 2026; Label: Mom + Pop; Formats: LP, CD, digital download, streaming

=== Extended plays ===
Title	Details
After EP	Released: April 4, 2025; Label: 7th Heaven, Ultraworld; Formats: LP, digital download, streaming
After EP 2	Released: October 17, 2025; Label: Mom + Pop; Formats: LP, digital download, streaming

=== Singles ===
List of singles, release year, and album name
Title	Year	Album
"Something Special"	2023	Non-album singles
"In a City Called Garden"	2023	Non-album singles
"The Dove"	2023	Non-album singles
"Obvious"	2024	After EP
"The Element"	2024	Non-album singles
"Everyday's a Blessing On This Bitchass Earth" (with Photographic Memory and Darcy Baylis)	2024	Non-album singles
"The Story"	2024	After EP 1 + EP 2
"Ever"	2025	After EP
"300 Dreams"	2025	After EP
"Deep Diving"	2025	After EP 2
"Outbound"	2025	After EP 2
"Cold" (Crossfade cover)	2026	Non-album single
"Promise (When You Go)"	2026	Fell Asleep in the Sun
"Take Me to Sunrise"	2026	Fell Asleep in the Sun
"Fell Asleep in the Sun"	2026	Fell Asleep in the Sun
"Blind"	2026	Fell Asleep in the Sun
