= Falling Away (album) =

Studio album by Crossfade
- Released: August 29, 2006
- Genre: Post-grunge
- Length: 39:43
- Label: Columbia
- Producers: Crossfade; Randy Staub; Steve Lillywhite

Crossfade chronology
Crossfade (2004)	Falling Away (2006)	We All Bleed (2011)

Singles from Falling Away
- 1. "Invincible" Released: April 13, 2006; 2. "Drown You Out" Released: September 26, 2006; 3. "Already Gone" Released: 2006

Professional ratings
Review scores
Source	Rating
AllMusic	2.5/5 stars

Falling Away is the second album by the American rock band Crossfade, released on August 29, 2006. After this album, Crossfade parted ways with Columbia Records. The album spawned three singles: "Invincible", "Drown You Out", and "Already Gone". The song "Breathing Slowly" was also on the band's earliest album, Numb, which they released in 1998 under the name the Nothing.

Falling Away peaked at No. 30 on the US Billboard 200.

== Track listing ==
All tracks are written by Ed Sloan and Mitch James.

No.	Title	Length
1.	"Washing the World Away"	3:53
2.	"Already Gone"	3:28
3.	"Someday"	3:55
4.	"Invincible"	4:13
5.	"Falling Away"	4:04
6.	"Everything's Wrong"	3:29
7.	"Why"	3:43
8.	"Breathing Slowly"	3:15
9.	"Anchor"	3:59
10.	"Drown You Out" (featuring Sahaj Ticotin)	3:10
11.	"Never Coming Home"	2:34
Total length:		39:43

Bonus tracks
No.	Title	Length
1.	"Breathing Slowly (acoustic)" (Best Buy exclusive)	3:46
2.	"Invincible (acoustic)" (Wal-Mart exclusive)	4:08

== Music videos ==
A music video of the song "Invincible" was released shortly after the song was released. A live video of "Drown You Out" was released as well, but features the band's new guitarist Les Hall and bassist Mitch James singing Sahaj Ticotin's vocal part of the song.

== Personnel ==
Crossfade

- Ed Sloan – guitar, vocals
- Mitch James – bass, vocals
- James Branham – drums, percussion

Additional musicians

- Sahaj Ticotin – co-lead vocals on "Drown You Out"

Production

- Crossfade – producer
- Randy Staub – producer, mixing
- Steve Lilywhite – producer and mixing on "Invincible"
- Darren Grahn – engineering
- Zach Blackstone – assistant engineer
- George Marino – mastering
- Mick Rock – photography
- Chris Spooner – art direction
- Dan Mandell – cover photo

== Charts ==
Weekly chart performance for Falling Away
Chart (2006)	Peak position
US Billboard 200	30
US Top Rock Albums (Billboard)	9
