= Collide (Howie Day song) =

2004 single by Howie Day

- US promotional cover

Single by Howie Day

from the album Stop All the World Now
- Released: June 1, 2004
- Genre: Pop rock; soft rock; folk
- Length: 4:09
- Label: Epic
- Songwriters: Howie Day; Kevin Griffin
- Producer: Youth

Howie Day singles chronology
| "She Says" (2004) | "Collide" (2004) | "Be There" (2009) |

Music video
- "Collide" on YouTube

"Collide" is a song by American singer-songwriter Howie Day. The song was written by Day and Better Than Ezra frontman Kevin Griffin, and the London Session Orchestra provided backing instrumentation on the initial album version of the song. "Collide" was released in the United States on June 1, 2004, as the third and final single from Day's second full-length album, Stop All the World Now (2003).

"Collide" became the biggest success of Day's career, reaching number 20 on the Billboard Hot 100 a year after its release in June 2005. It peaked even higher on component charts, reaching number seven on the Adult Top 40 chart. Internationally, the track entered the airplay charts of Bolivia and Canada.

== Background and content ==
Howie Day collaborated with Griffin while writing "Collide". According to the sheet music published on Musicnotes.com by Alfred Publishing, "Collide" is written in the key of B major, with Day's vocals ranging from F♯_{3} – G♯5. The song's lyrics are rooted in a relationship, with notes of the occasional adversity the two people involved may face. Day said of the song's appearance in One Tree Hill, "It's odd, I guess, because the single is a year old. But it's good especially because it will be the last single from this record and it's going out on a really good note."

== Critical reception ==
The Beaver County Times put the song in their "All You Need is Love" list writing, "Perfect for the newbie phase of a relationship. Sure, you're still scared, but as Day sings "Out of the doubt that fills my mind I somehow found you and I collide," it cajoles you to just give in to the lovin' in front of you." Julie Kertes of Radio & Records said that the song "achieve[s] a vibe that is somewhat introspective and melancholy with a hint of optimism."

== Chart performance ==
The popularity of "Collide" built slowly on US radio, at first gaining the greatest success on Billboard's Adult Top 40 chart. Chart performance benefitted significantly from a reissue of Stop All the World Now in a special edition that included four bonus tracks, one being an acoustic version of the song that reached number 20 on the Billboard Hot 100 chart. In February 2005, the track received an award from Broadcast Data Systems for 50,000 spins. By September 2005, the track had surpassed 200,000 confirmed spins. The following year in October 2006, it had been played 300,000 confirmed times on radio. As of April 2011, "Collide" has surpassed 400,000 confirmed spins on radio from different formats. Additionally, it tied a record with Jann Arden's "Insensitive" (1994) for the slowest trek into the top 10 of the Billboard Adult Top 40, entering the top 10 during its 26th week at number nine.

== Music video ==
The music video was filmed in Toronto, Canada. The video features Day singing on the commuter train while recalling happy memories with his partner, interspersed with clips of Day playing guitar beneath a bridge.

== Personnel ==
Personnel are taken from the Stop All the World Now booklet.

- Wil Malone – string arrangement
- Gavyn Wright – conductor
- Laurie Jenkins – drums and percussion
- Michael Brauer – mixing
- Nathaniel Chen – assistant mixing engineer
- London Session Orchestra – orchestra

== Charts ==
=== Weekly charts ===
2004–2005 weekly chart performance for "Collide"
| Chart (2004–2005) | Peak position |
|---|---|
| Bolivia (WKM Radio FM 91.5) | 19 |
| Canada AC Top 30 (Radio & Records) | 7 |
| Canada Hot AC Top 30 (Radio & Records) | 13 |
| US Billboard Hot 100 | 20 |
| US Adult Contemporary (Billboard) | 14 |
| US Adult Top 40 (Billboard) | 7 |
| US Mainstream Top 40 (Billboard) | 14 |
| US Triple-A (Billboard) | 15 |
| US Adult Contemporary (Radio & Records) | 13 |
| US CHR/Pop (Radio & Records) | 14 |
| US Hot AC (Radio & Records) | 7 |
| US Triple-A (Radio & Records) | 10 |

2010 weekly chart performance for "Collide"
| Chart (2010) | Peak position |
|---|---|
| Canada Digital Song Sales (Billboard) | 50 |

=== Year-end charts ===
2004 year-end chart performance for "Collide"
| Chart (2004) | Position |
|---|---|
| US Adult Top 40 (Billboard) | 58 |
| US Hot AC (Radio & Records) | 63 |

2005 year-end chart performance for "Collide"
| Chart (2005) | Position |
|---|---|
| US Billboard Hot 100 | 45 |
| US Adult Contemporary (Billboard) | 21 |
| US Adult Top 40 (Billboard) | 6 |
| US Mainstream Top 40 (Billboard) | 44 |
| US Adult Contemporary (Radio & Records) | 22 |
| US CHR/Pop (Radio & Records) | 42 |
| US Hot AC (Radio & Records) | 7 |
| US Triple-A (Radio & Records) | 12 |
| US Triple-A Indicator (Radio & Records) | 57 |

== Certifications ==
Certifications for "Collide"
| Region | Certification | Certified units/sales |
|---|---|---|
| Denmark (IFPI Danmark) | Gold | 45,000^{‡} |
| United Kingdom (BPI) | Silver | 200,000^{‡} |
| United States (RIAA) | 4× Platinum | 4,000,000^{‡} |
^{‡} Sales+streaming figures based on certification alone.

== Release history ==
| =Release dates and formats for "Collide" | Region | Date | Format(s) | Label(s) | Ref. |
| United States | June 1, 2004 | Triple A radio | Epic | | |
| United States | June 28, 2004 | Hot adult contemporary radio | Epic | | |
| United States | January 24, 2005 | Contemporary hit radio | Epic | | |
| United States | February 22, 2005 | Adult contemporary radio | Epic | | |

== Cover versions ==
In 2011, reggae singer Singing Melody covered the song on his album titled They Call Me Mr. Melody on the VP Records label. Singing Melody's cover of the song became number one on 4 international reggae charts. The album also reached number six on the Billboard Reggae Chart.

Daniel Evans, a finalist on The X Factor series 5, produced a country/pop cover on his YouTube channel in 2013 and was subsequently released on iTunes as track 3 of his self-produced Reflections EP.

In 2015, Sarah Charley, US communications manager for the Large Hadron Collider experiments at CERN with graduate students Jesse Heilman of the University of California, Riverside, and Tom Perry and Laser Seymour Kaplan of the University of Wisconsin–Madison created a parody video sung from the perspective of a proton in the Large Hadron Collider.

== In popular culture ==
In 2015, after the US communications officer and three graduate students at the European Organization for Nuclear Research (CERN) shared a parody video of "Collide", Day made a new version of the song in a video during a visit to CERN. The lyrics were changed to the perspective of a proton in the Large Hadron Collider.
