= Be There =

Be There may refer to:

- "Be There" (Howie Day song), 2009
- "Be There" (B'z song), 1990
- "Be There" (Unkle song), 1999
- Be There (AB6IX song), 2019
- "Be There", by Space from Tin Planet, 1998
- "Be There", by Clive Griffin, 1989
- "Be There", by iamnot, 2017
