= Vertigo (Jump, Little Children album) =

Studio album by Jump, Little Children
- Released: May 8, 2001
- Recorded: 2001
- Genre: Indie rock, alternative rock
- Length: 62:00
- Label: EZ Chief
- Producer: Brad Wood & Jay Clifford

Jump, Little Children chronology
Magazine (1998)	Vertigo (2001)	Between the Dim & the Dark (2004)

Professional ratings
Review scores
Source	Rating
AllMusic	2/5 stars

Vertigo is the fourth album by American alternative rock group Jump, Little Children, released in 2001 after being dropped by Atlantic Records.

== Track listing ==
All songs written by Jay Clifford, except where noted.

1. "Vertigo" – 4:00
2. "Angeldust (Please Come Down)" – 4:22
3. "Too High" – 4:19
4. "Hold Your Tongue" – 4:30
5. "Lover's Greed" – 4:27
6. "Yearling" – 3:58
7. "Mother's Eyes" – 7:26
8. "Come Around" – 4:39
9. "Words of Wisdom" (Evan Bivins) – 3:56
10. "The House Our Father Knew" (Evan Bivins, Clifford) – 4:04
11. "Made It Fine" – 3:51
12. "Overkill" – 3:26
13. "Singer" (Matthew Bivins) – 4:36
14. "Pigeon" – 4:26

== Personnel ==
- Evan Bivins – drums & percussion
- Jonathan Gray – upright bass, backing vocals
- Matthew Bivins – accordion, harmonica, mandolin, tin whistle, keyboard, vocals
- Jay Clifford – vocals, guitars, piano
- Ward Williams – cello, guitar, backing vocals
- Michael Bellar – piano, Hammond organ
- Lenny Castro – Percussion Quartet Illumina

== Chart positions ==
Year	Album	Chart	Peak Position
2001	Vertigo	Billboard Top Independent Albums	No. 44
