= Howie Day =

American singer-songwriter (born 1981)

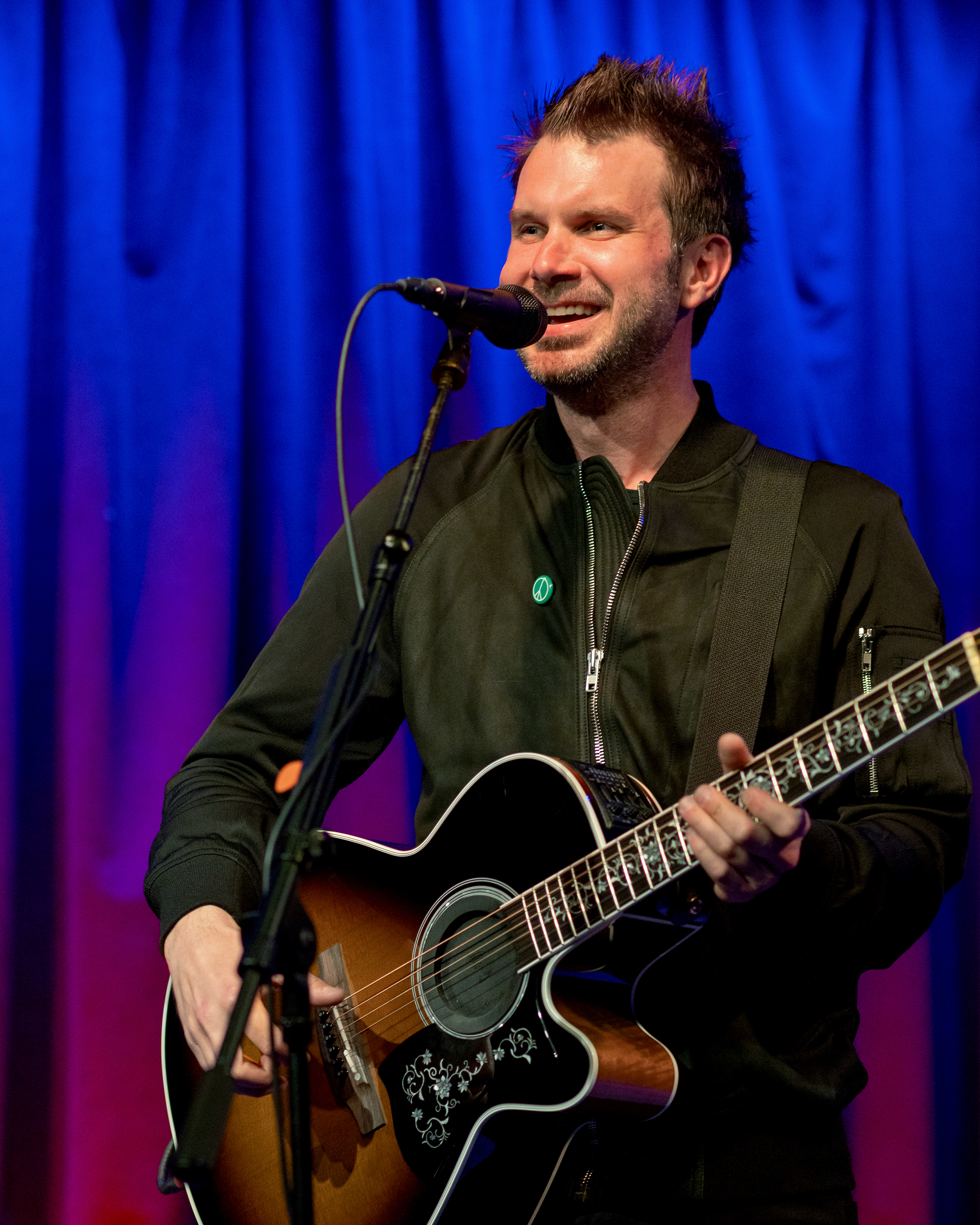
- Day performing in 2015

Background information
- Born: Howard Kern Day; January 15, 1981 (age 45); Bangor, Maine, U.S.
- Origin: Brewer, Maine, U.S.
- Genres: Pop rock; indie rock
- Occupation: Singer-songwriter
- Instruments: Vocals; guitar; piano; keyboards
- Years active: 1993–present
- Label: Sony BMG/Epic
- Website: www.howieday.com

Howard Kern Day (born January 15, 1981) is an American singer-songwriter. Beginning his career as a solo artist in the late 1990s, Day became known for his extensive touring and in-concert use of samplers and effects pedals to accompany himself. He self-financed and self-released his first album, Australia, in 2000.

Day eventually signed a recording contract with major label Epic Records in 2002 and has since re-released his debut as well as producing a follow-up, Stop All The World Now. Despite initially sluggish sales, Stop All The World Now was certified gold in early 2005, and has produced a number of singles, including the hits "She Says" and "Collide", Day's most successful to date. "Collide" later became Day's first platinum single, eventually selling 1.5 million downloads.

After a five-year tour before the release of Stop All The World Now followed by a three-year tour, Day took some time off and focused on writing music. Day released his Be There EP in May 2009 followed by Sound The Alarm, released on September 8, 2009. In December 2014, Day created a PledgeMusic campaign to fund a new album, Lanterns, which was released to pledgers on April 16, 2015. The album was released on iTunes April 28, 2015. Several songs on the album feature Aimee Mann on backing vocals.

== Early years ==
Born in Bangor, Maine and raised in Brewer, Howie Day began to play music at age five when his mother bought a piano at an auction. When Day's mother noticed that her son was able to play by ear tunes of television advertising jingles, she enrolled him in piano lessons, which he would continue for six years.He attended Brewer High School.

== Career ==
At around age 13, Day's interest drifted toward rock music and the electric guitar. His father bought him a Fender Stratocaster and enrolled him in basic vocal training. His parents owned and ran a popular local restaurant, which gave Day a public arena in which to start performing, playing every Friday night for patrons. Day made his first stage appearance in August 1996 at Bangor restaurant Captain Nick's. Day played in a local band called Route 66 throughout 1997 and made sporadic solo appearances in local venues until booking agent Shawn Radley discovered him the following year while Day was supporting Ziggy Marley at the University of Maine. Radley became Day's manager in June 1998, and Day began touring more extensively, leading him to miss 45 days of school and to almost fail his senior year.

=== Howie Day EP (1998) ===
In 1998, Day recorded his first demo EP, which contained covers of songs by Dave Matthews Band, Barenaked Ladies, and Goo Goo Dolls in a Ryan Miller (Guster) style alongside the originals "Buzzing" and "Lick My Lips". This EP was followed later in 1998 by another demo consisting wholly of Day's originals.

On the strength of these performances and demos, Radley secured Day a showcase at the annual National Association for Campus Activities Convention, where he played for 1,500 college talent buyers. Having received around four months of bookings at colleges around the United States, Day decided to defer attending college in favor of his burgeoning music career.

Day recorded a cover of The Beatles' "Help!" for the soundtrack to the 2001 film I Am Sam.

=== Debut album Australia (2000) ===
Day's first full-length album, Australia, was self-financed and independently released. It was named "Best Debut Album" at the 2001 Boston Music Awards. Fans consider it to be one of his best and most authentic works, with follow-up albums Stop All The World Now and Sound the Alarm as having a more commercial, polished sound and feel.

=== Tour and Stop All the World Now (2001–2003) ===
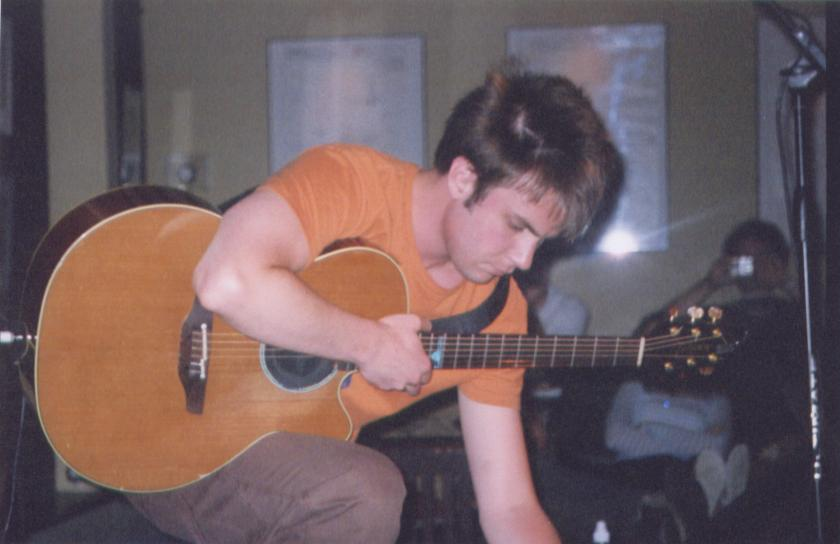
Howie Day adjusting pedals at the Point in Philadelphia, Pennsylvania, c. 2004

After the EP's release, Day relocated to London, England to record Australia's follow up, which was provisionally titled From a Northern Sky. The album, which would eventually become Stop All The World Now, was recorded in London's famous Olympic Studios with Martin "Youth" Glover, the bassist for British band Killing Joke, whose previous production credits included The Verve's Urban Hymns, one of Day's favorite albums.

While certain tracks on Australia had featured session musicians, Stop All The World Now saw Day joined for the first time by a permanent backing band, consisting of multi-instrumentalist Les Hall, drummer Laurie Jenkins, Drummer Mark Heaney, and ex-Verve bassist Simon Jones. In addition, the majority of the album's songs were co-written with either Better than Ezra frontman Kevin Griffin or Jump Little Children's Jay Clifford.

In the autumn of 2002, Day was the opening act for Tori Amos.

A full-band tour to promote Stop All the World Now began on September 27, 2003. Due to other commitments, Simon Jones was unable to tour with the group and was replaced by Jeremy Curtis. The album was released one week and three days later on October 7 to tepid critical reactions. Rolling Stone's Pat Blashill referred to Stop as "not bad" but "indistinct", but Popmatters' Devon Powers noted that though Australia had been an album one falls for passionately, "Stop All the World Now is an album you have a crush on, not one you fall deeply, complexly, and foolishly in love with. And crushes have a way of disappearing suddenly, without a trace."

Sales of Stop were initially sluggish, but slowly began to rise beginning in late 2004 with the single release of ballad "Collide", which became a popular radio hit and was featured on TV shows such as Cold Case, Scrubs, Grey's Anatomy, Bones, and Two and a Half Men as well as soundtracking a promotional trailer for the 2005 film adaptation of Jane Austen's Pride and Prejudice. Stop was finally certified gold in early 2005. Fan favorite "She Says", which was first released on 1998's White EP, was released as a follow-up to "Collide".

Boosted by the slow success of Stop All the World Now, Epic released the Live From... EP on December 6, 2005. The 7-track EP contains live renditions of songs from Australia and Stop All the World Now as well as a cover of Crowded House's "Don't Dream It's Over". The EP has not been widely reviewed, though Allmusic referred to the release as "holiday market product", "tepid", and "directionless".

=== Be There EP (2009) ===
Day released an EP, introducing his new album, featuring three new songs: "Be There", "40 Hours", and "Counting On Me". These tracks were available on iTunes. "Be There", produced by Kevin Griffin, Mike Flynn, and Warren Huart, was serviced to radio as the first single from the album.

=== Sound the Alarm (2009) ===
Day released his third full-length album, Sound the Alarm under the Epic music label on September 8, 2009. After an extensive tour schedule following the release of Stop, Day decided to take some time off, during which he sorted through his emotions by writing songs, many of which have made their way onto Sound the Alarm. "I toured for five years straight before Stop All The World Now came out, then for three years non-stop after it was released," Day says.

To get his desired range of sounds and moods, Day recorded in a variety of locations, including Los Angeles, New York (Joel Hamilton), London, Minneapolis, and Bloomington, Indiana, between the spring of 2006 and fall of 2008. He also collaborated with several musicians and producers, including Martin Terefe (Jason Mraz, KT Tunstall), Mike Denneen (Aimee Mann, Fountains of Wayne), Mike Flynn (The Fray, Augustana), Warren Huart (The Fray, Augustana, Better Than Ezra) and Kevin Griffin. "Be There" and "Longest Night" have been used in the CW show The Vampire Diaries.

=== Ceasefire EP (2011) ===
Consisting of tracks that were left off Sound the Alarm, the Ceasefire EP was released on June 29, 2011.

=== Lanterns (2015) ===
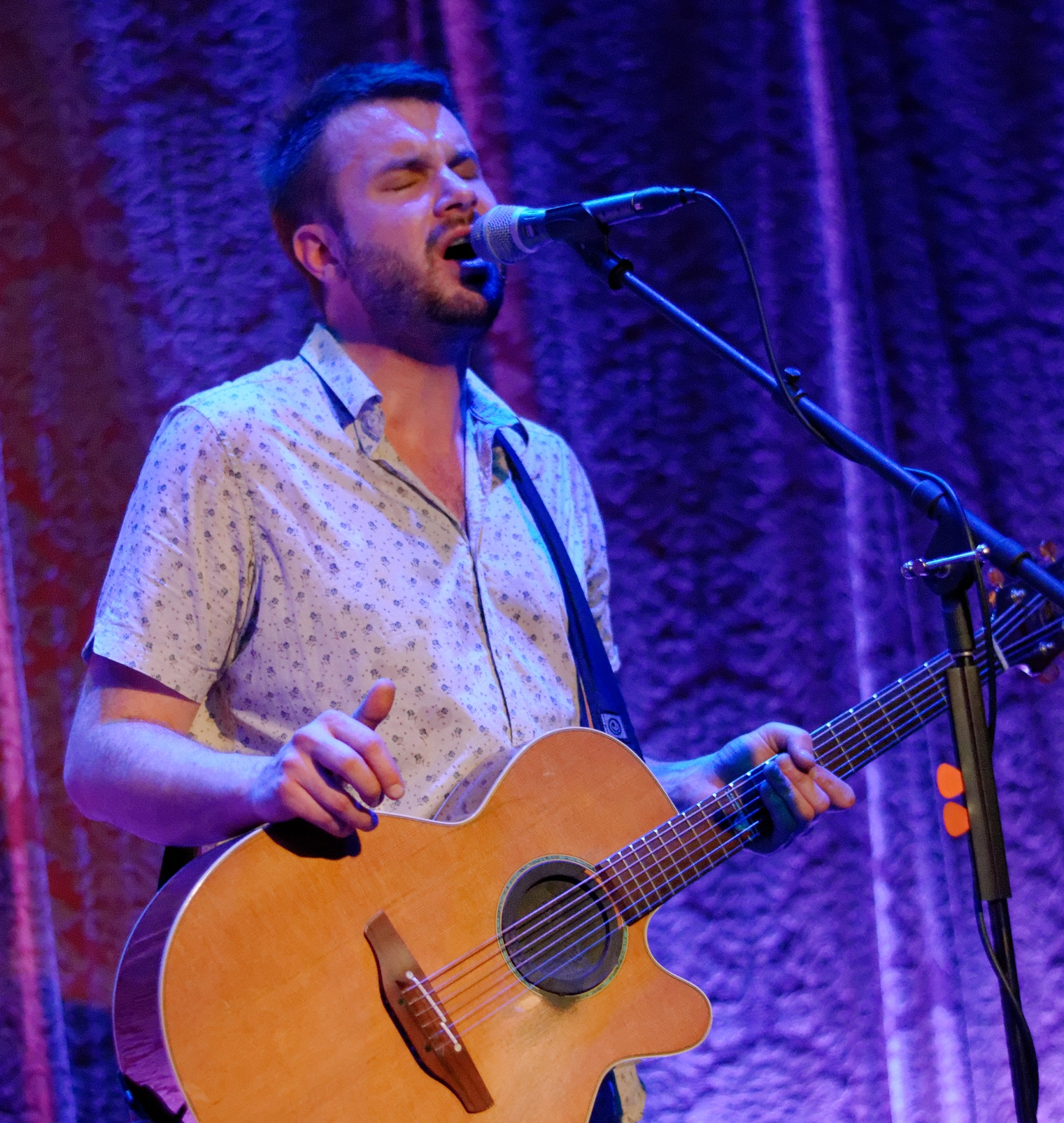
Day performing in 2013

Day created a PledgeMusic campaign in December 2014 to fund a new album, Lanterns, which was released to pledgers on April 16, 2015. The album was released on iTunes April 28, 2015. When asked about taking the PledgeMusic avenue, Day said "It not only helped pay some of the studio bill, it was also really encouraging to have the fans behind me during the process. I am incredibly grateful." Day's loyal fan base have given mostly favorable reviews. Several songs on the album feature Aimee Mann on backing vocals.

=== Parody of "Collide" at CERN ===
In 2015, members of the CERN wrote a parody of "Collide", describing the experiments of the Large Hadron Collider from the point of view of a proton. After hearing the parody, Day visited CERN and recorded a cover of the parody of his own song, complete with a clip filmed on site in the tunnels of LHC and in front of the ATLAS detector.

== Personal life ==
Day received significant negative attention after two high-profile arrests. In 2004, Day was arrested and charged over an incident in which he was accused of locking a female fan in the bathroom of his tour bus and destroying the cellular phone of another, for which he was fined. In December 2005, Day was arrested in Boston after reportedly verbally abusing the flight crew while under the influence of alcohol and sleeping pills. He was sentenced to one year's probation on April 26, 2006.

In 2013, Day reflected on his younger experiences by saying, "I was a kid from Maine who went from zero to 380 in about two seconds, so it was kind of overwhelming. But that's no excuse. I drank a bit too much. A lot of kids run wild, but it’s a big difference when people know who you are."

In April 2018, Day was charged with fourth-degree assault for shoving his girlfriend, Carrie Pencek. Day was arrested for assaulting Pencek a second time in August 2019. While staying in a New York City hotel, Day allegedly choked her and threw her to the floor, causing injury to her face, hands, and neck. Day was charged with third-degree assault, harassment, obstructing another person's breathing, and criminal possession of Xanax, a controlled substance.

== Discography ==
=== Studio albums ===
| Title | Details | Peak chart positions | | | | Certifications (sales threshold) |
| Title | Details | US | US Rock | US Heat | FRA | Certifications (sales threshold) |
|---|---|---|---|---|---|---|
| Australia | Release date: November 1, 2000; Label: Daze Records; Formats: CD, cassette | — | — | 18 | — | |
| Stop All the World Now | Release date: October 7, 2003; Label: Epic Records; Formats: CD, cassette | 46 | — | — | 172 | RIAA: Platinum |
| Sound the Alarm | Release date: September 8, 2009; Label: Epic Records; Formats: CD, music download | 82 | 31 | | — | |
| Lanterns | Release date: April 16, 2015; Label: Daze Records; Formats: CD, music download | — | — | — | — | |
"—" denotes releases that did not chart

=== Singles ===
| Single | Year | Peak chart positions | | | | Certifications (sales threshold) | Album |
| Single | Year | US | US AC | US Adult | US Pop | Certifications (sales threshold) | Album |
|---|---|---|---|---|---|---|---|
| "Perfect Time of Day" | 2003 | — | — | 21 | — | | Stop All the World Now |
| "Collide" | 2004 | 20 | 14 | 7 | 14 | RIAA: 4× Platinum | Stop All the World Now |
| "She Says" | 2005 | — | 31 | 6 | 39 | | Stop All the World Now |
| "Be There" | 2009 | — | — | 23 | — | | Sound the Alarm |
"—" denotes releases that did not chart

=== Singles and EPs ===
| Single/EP | Release date | Label | Format(s) | Notes |
|---|---|---|---|---|
| Howie Day (Demo) | 1998 | Self-released | CD | Four-song promotional CD for booking |
| The White EP (#1) | 1998 | Self-released | CD | Four-song promotional CD |
| The White EP (#2) | 1998 | Self-released | CD | Four-song promotional CD |
| The Blue EP | 2000 | Self-released | CD | Four-song promotional CD released in advance of Australia |
| IRA Live EP | 2002 | Epic Records | CD | Four-song promotional CD released after Australia |
| Madrigals EP | April 29, 2003 | Epic Records | CD | Featured bonus DVD |
| "Standing in the Sun" | November 4, 2003 | Epic Records | iTunes single | |
| Extras | April 1, 2004 | Epic Records | CD | Four-song promotional CD |
| Live From... EP | December 6, 2005 | Epic Records | CD | |
| Be There EP | May 5, 2009 | Epic Records | iTunes single | |
| Ceasefire EP | June 29, 2011 | | CD & music download | O |

== Concert tours ==
- Songs & Stories Tour (2025)
