= Be There (Howie Day song) =

Single by Howie Day

from the album Sound the Alarm
- Released: June 1, 2009
- Recorded: 2009
- Genre: Pop rock; soft rock
- Length: 3:52
- Label: Epic
- Songwriters: Howie Day; Kevin Griffin
- Producers: Kevin Griffin; Mike Flynn

Howie Day singles chronology
"Collide" (2004)	"Be There" (2009)

"Be There" is a song by American singer-songwriter Howie Day's third studio album Sound the Alarm (2009). Written by Day and frequent collaborator Kevin Griffin, the track was released to adult album alternative radio on June 1, 2009, as the lead single from the album. It was the first single Day had released in nearly five years following the 2005 re-release of "She Says" (2004). As of November 2010, he has performed the track live 48 times.

== Personnel ==
Taken from the Sound the Alarm booklet.

- Dan Rothchild – bass
- Warren Huart – co-producer
- Travis McNabb – drums
- Warren Huart – engineer
- Kevin Griffin – additional engineer
- Robin Holden, Troy Brazell – assistant engineers
- David Levita, Kevin Griffin – guitar
- Kevin Griffin, Tim Vine – keyboards (keys)
- Kevin Griffin, Mike Flynn – producer
- Howie Day, Kevin Griffin – writers

== Charts ==
"Be There" debuted on the Billboard Adult Top 40 chart, now known as Adult Pop Airplay, at number 38 on July 11, 2009. The track would peak at number 23 in its 18th week on the chart on November 7, 2009.

Weekly chart performance for "Be There"
Chart (2009)	Peak position
US Adult Alternative Airplay (Billboard)	14
US Adult Pop Airplay (Billboard)	23

=== Year-end charts ===
Year-end chart performance for "Be There"
Chart (2009)	Peak position
US Hot AC (Mediabase)	84
US Triple A (Mediabase)	50
