= Between the Dim & the Dark =

Studio album by Jump, Little Children
- Released: April 20, 2004
- Genre: Alternative rock
- Length: 44:42
- Label: Brash Music
- Producer: Rick Beato

Jump, Little Children chronology
Vertigo (2001)	Between the Dim & the Dark (2004)	Between the Glow & the Light (2005)

Professional ratings
Review scores
Source	Rating
AllMusic	4/5 stars

Between the Dim & the Dark is a 2004 album by American alternative rock band Jump, Little Children.

== Track listing ==
1. "Dim and the Dark" – 4:49
2. "Hold You Down" – 3:33
3. "Rains in Asia" – 4:00
4. "Mexico" – 4:33
5. "Education" – 4:21
6. "Young America" – 4:13
7. "Broken" – 3:30
8. "Requiem" – 5:26
9. "Midnight" – 4:51
10. "Daylight" – 5:26

== Personnel ==
Jump, Little Children

- Even Bivins – drums, ercussion
- Matthew Bivins – accordion, harmonica, mandolin
- Jay Clifford – guitar, keyboards, vocals
- Ward Williams – cello, dobro, guitar

Additional musicians

- Matt Evans – violin
- Les Hall – keyboards, piano
- Amanda Kapousouz – violin

Production

- Rick Beato – engineer, mixer, producer

== Chart positions ==
Year	Album	Chart	Peak Position
2004	Between the Dim & the Dark	Billboard Top Independent Albums	No. 42
