= Sound the Alarm (Howie Day album) =

Studio album by Howie Day
- Released: September 8, 2009
- Recorded: 2006–09
- Genre: Pop rock, alternative rock
- Length: 45:30
- Label: Epic

Howie Day chronology
Stop All the World Now (2003)	Sound the Alarm (2009)	Lanterns (2015)

Singles from Sound the Alarm
- 1. "Be There" Released: August 25, 2009

Sound the Alarm is the third full-length album by American singer-songwriter Howie Day, and the follow-up to his million-selling second album Stop All the World Now. It was recorded over a three-year period, during which he attended a rehabilitation center for alcohol abuse. The album was originally set for release in 2008 before being delayed and eventually released by Epic Records on September 8, 2009. In late 2008, Day uploaded the song "Everyone Loves to Love a Lie" onto his MySpace page. The album was also preceded by a three-song EP, entitled Be There, featuring the album tracks "Be There", "40 Hours" and "Counting on Me". The EP was released to iTunes on May 5, 2009.

Professional ratings
Review scores
Source	Rating
Allmusic	2.5/5 stars

== Track listing ==
1. "So Stung" (Howie Day, Jay Clifford) – 4:37
2. "Weightless" (Day, Martin Terefe) – 3:57
3. "Longest Night" (Day, Mike Flynn, Kevin Griffin, Clifford) – 3:35
4. "40 Hours" (Day, Clifford) – 3:33
5. "Be There" (Day, Griffin) – 3:51
6. "Everyone Loves to Love a Lie" (Day, Clifford) – 4:02
7. "Undressed" (Day, Griffin) – 3:33
8. "Sound the Alarm" (Day, Clifford) – 3:51
9. "No Longer What You Require" (Steven Fiore) – 5:59
10. "Postcard from Mars" (Day, Les Hall) – 4:48
11. "Counting on Me" (Day, Clifford) – 3:37

=== iTunes bonus tracks ===
1. "Stay This Way" (Album-only track) – 4:12
2. "Cease Fire" (Pre-order only) – 3:57

== Personnel ==
- Jay Clifford – guitar, backing vocals
- Howie Day – acoustic guitar, piano, vocals
- Les Hall – organ, synthesizer, guitar, piano, harmonium, tamboura, mellotron, vibraphone, wurlitzer

== Record charts ==
Chart (2009)	Peak position
US Billboard 200	82
US Top Rock Albums (Billboard)	31
