= Make Me a Believer =

Make Me a Believer may refer to:

- "Make Me a Believer", a song by Andy Mineo from the album Uncomfortable, 2015
- "Make Me a Believer", a song by Conrad Sewell from the album Precious, 2023
- "Make Me a Believer", a song by Crossfade from the album We All Bleed, 2011
- "Make Me a Believer", a song by Luther Vandross from the album Busy Body, 1983
