= Stop All the World Now =

Studio album by Howie Day
- Released: October 7, 2003
- Studio: Olympic Studios; London, United Kingdom
- Length: 52:31; 71:50 (special edition)
- Label: Epic
- Producer: Martin "Youth" Glover

Howie Day chronology
Australia (2000)	Stop All the World Now (2003)	Sound the Alarm (2009)

Alternative cover
- Special edition

Singles from Stop All the World Now
- 1. "Perfect Time of Day" Released: August 12, 2003; 2. "She Says" Released: January 26, 2004; 3. "Collide" Released: June 1, 2004

Stop All the World Now is the second album and major label debut by American singer-songwriter Howie Day. It was recorded at Olympic Studios in London and released by Epic Records on October 7, 2003. Day chose Martin Glover as a producer, known for producing the Verve's Urban Hymns.

The album was certified Platinum on May 20, 2005, by the RIAA for sales of one million copies in the United States. The single "Collide" was certified Gold on September 15, 2005.

== Promotion and reception ==
Professional ratings
Review scores
Source	Rating
Allmusic	4/5 stars
Blender	2/5 stars
PopMatters	
Rolling Stone	2/5 stars

On September 27, 2003, a full band tour began to promote the album.

After its release the record received lukewarm reactions. Rolling Stone's author Pat Blashill referred to the album as "[...] not bad. It's tender and well-felt and pretty. But [...] the music feels indistinct, even sorta impersonal." Devon Powers from PopMatters noted that "Stop All the World Now is an album you have a crush on, not one you fall deeply, complexly, and foolishly in love with. And crushes have a way of disappearing suddenly, without a trace."

== Editions ==
Concurrently with the normal release a limited edition was released along with a bonus DVD with footage of Day recording his album in London. A Japanese edition containing two bonus tracks was also released. On November 16, 2004, a special edition of the album was released, featuring a new album cover, two bonus tracks, an acoustic version of "Collide", and a live recording of "Brace Yourself". On May 31, 2005, a DualDisc edition was released with the album in high fidelity audio on a Super Audio CD, with video clips of "Collide", "Brace Yourself" and "Perfect Time of Day", live videos of the songs "Bunnies" and "Ghost", and several other extras.

== Track listing ==
All songs produced by Martin "Youth" Glover.

Standard edition
No.	Title	Writer(s)	Length
1.	"Brace Yourself"	Howie Day; Jay Clifford	3:40
2.	"Perfect Time of Day"	Day; Kevin Griffin	4:21
3.	"Collide"	Day; Griffin	4:09
4.	"Trouble in Here"	Day; Peter Zizzo	5:57
5.	"Sunday Morning Song"	Day; Griffin	3:57
6.	"I'll Take You On"	Day; Clifford	5:38
7.	"She Says" (Chris Lord-Alge Long Mix)	Day	4:40
8.	"Numbness for Sound"	Day	3:51
9.	"You & a Promise"	Day; Clifford	6:24
10.	"End of Our Days"	Day; Zizzo	4:22
11.	"Come Lay Down"	Day; Clifford	5:52
Total length:			52:51

Special edition
No.	Title	Writer(s)	Length
12.	"This Time Around"	Howie Day	5:11
13.	"Standing in the Sun"	Day	5:41
14.	"Brace Yourself" (Live Acoustic)	Day; Kevin Griffin	3:50
15.	"Collide" (Acoustic)	Day; Griffin	4:37
Total length:			72:10

Japanese edition
No.	Title	Writer(s)	Length
12.	"Standing in the Sun"	Howie Day	5:41
13.	"So, Goodbye"	Day	4:46
Total length:			63:18

== Personnel ==
- James Clifford – guitar, background vocals
- Howie Day – acoustic guitar, piano, vocals
- Les Hall – organ, synthesizer, guitar, piano, harmonium, tamboura, mellotron, vibraphone, wurlitzer
- Mark Heaney – drums
- Laurie Jenkins – percussion, drums
- Simon Jones – bass
- London Philharmonic Orchestra – strings

== Charts ==
Weekly chart performance for Stop All the World Now
Chart (2003)	Peak position
US Billboard 200	46

== Certifications ==
Region	Certification	Certified units/sales
United States (RIAA)	Platinum	1,000,000^{‡}
^{‡} Sales+streaming figures based on certification alone.

== Sources ==
- Eisen, Benjy (May 18, 2005), Rolling Stone: Howie Day Meets World, Rolling Stone Australia, archived from the original on October 27, 2007
- Allmusic: Stop All the World Now credits
- howiefan.com: Stop All the World Now
- ModernRock.com: Singer-Songwriter Howie Day's 'Stop All The World Now' showcases his talent, October 7, 2003
- SonyMusicStore: Stop All The World Now DualDisc, archived from the original on March 12, 2006
