= Warren Huart =

English recording engineer, producer, musician

- Born: 28 January 1969 (age 57); Crookham Village, Hampshire, England
- Occupations: Producer; engineer; songwriter; musician
- Years active: 1993–present
- Formerly of: Star 69
- Website: warrenhuart.com

Warren Huart (/ˈhjuərt/ HYOO-ərt; born 28 January 1969) is an English record producer, musician, composer and recording engineer based in Los Angeles, California who is most associated as a music producer and/or engineer in the recording industry as a multi-platinum producer for The Fray, Daniel Powter, Marc Broussard, Trevor Hall, Korn, Better Than Ezra, James Blunt, Matisyahu, Ace Frehley, Aerosmith and Howie Day. His film and television credits include Inglourious Basterds, Transformers: Revenge of the Fallen, MTV's The Hills, Lost, Scrubs, and Grey's Anatomy.

== Biography ==
Warren Huart was born in Crookham Village, Hampshire, England on 28 January 1969. While in England he joined the band Star 69. The band relocated to the United States in 1996 to record Eating February with record producer Don Smith (music producer). The album was released on Radioactive Records/MCA Records in 1997. After the breakup of Star 69, Huart formed Disappointment Incorporated (Dis. Inc.), which released an EP, Spoken Through Profits, and an album, F=0, on Time Bomb Recordings/Arista in 1998 and 1999 respectively.

Huart is the owner of Spitfire Studio in Los Angeles, California, and runs a DIY YouTube Channel called "Produce Like a Pro" with over 800,000 subscribers worldwide. Huart is also an audio educator, and was awarded a 2019 TEC Award for Audio Education Technology for his Produce Like a Pro website. Huart recently wrote the song 'Take My Love' for Steve Lukather's latest album 'Bridges' along with Steve Maggiora.

In 2023, he released guide book called "Home Studio Recording: The Complete Guide".

== Production and engineering ==
Huart has produced, written with and/or engineered the following artists among others:

- Augustana
- Ace Frehley
- Aerosmith
- The Fray
- Kris Allen
- Ramones
- James Blunt
- Steve Lukather
- The X Factor (U.S.)
- Daniel Powter
- Jamie Hartman of Ben's Brother
- Hot Hot Heat
- The Thrills
- Vedera
- Korn
- Mimi Page
- Josiah Leming
- Black Veil Brides
- Better Than Ezra
- Howie Day
- The Dance Party
- Brendan James
- Matisyahu
- Mandi Perkins
- Secondhand Serenade
- Mikey Wax
- Chase Coy
- Colbie Caillat
- Eve 6
- Future Leaders of the World
- The Tender Box
- Jay Clifford from Jump Little Children
- Johnette Napolitano from Concrete Blonde
- The Fontaine Brothers
- Robert Jon & the Wreck

== Charts and awards ==
- Recorded The Fray's self-titled second album which debuted at Number One on the Billboard charts.
- Recorded Augustana's second album Can't Love, Can't Hurt.
- Warren recorded Howie Day's 2005/2006 hit single "She Says", which reached number 6 on the Adult Top 40 chart and the number 1 on Top 40 Adult Recurrents.
- Recorded and Mixed The Fray's cover of "Happy Xmas (War is Over)", which was the first song to chart on the Billboard Hot 100 with digital sales only.
- Recorded drums for The Fray's hit "How To Save A Life", which reached number 3 on the Billboard Hot 100, spent 15 weeks at number 1 on the Adult Top 40, and was nominated for the 49th Grammy Awards for Best Rock Performance by a Duo or Group with Vocal.

== Produce Like a Pro ==
In 2014, Huart started a YouTube channel titled "Produce Like a Pro", with professional audio recording tips for beginners. His instructional videos encompass every aspect of recording, engineering, producing and technical properties involved in running a home-based studio. Huart has a base of over 800,000 subscribers and over 115 million views.

== Personal life ==
Huart currently lives in the Los Angeles area with his wife and their two children.

== Bibliography ==
- Home Studio Recording: The Complete Guide, W. Huart, J. Hammack, 2023 ISBN 979-8365801820
