= Fell Asleep in the Sun =

Studio album by After
- Released: September 18, 2026
- Genres: Trip hop; electropop; chillwave
- Length: 41:31
- Label: Mom + Pop
- Producers: Graham Epstein; Jackson Shanks; Alex Craig; Darcy Baylis; Oscar Scheller; Jeff Hazin; Ralph Castelli; Lucas Starbuck; Casey Lagos; Aaron Shadrow

After chronology
After EP 2 (2025)	Fell Asleep in the Sun (2026)

Singles from Fell Asleep in the Sun
- 1. "Promise (When You Go)" Released: May 6, 2026; 2. "Take Me to Sunrise" Released: July 15, 2026; 3. "Fell Asleep in the Sun" Released: August 14, 2026; 4. "Blind" Released: September 4, 2026

Professional ratings
Review scores
Source	Rating
Backseat Mafia	86%
Pitchfork	5.8/10

Fell Asleep in the Sun is the debut studio album by American pop duo After. It was released on September 18, 2026, through Mom + Pop Music. The album was promoted by four singles: "Promise (When You Go)", "Take Me to Sunrise", the title track "Fell Asleep in the Sun", and "Blind".

== Background and release ==
On May 6, 2026, After released the single "Promise (When You Go)". On July 15, 2026, Fell Asleep in the Sun was announced, alongside the release of the single "Take Me to Sunrise" and an accompanying music video.

In the album's announcement, the band said, "This is an album that in our wildest dreams we wanted to make when we first started After. It is a true journey through city streets, treacherous oceans, crowds of strangers, patches of sunlight, dark tunnels, and snowy peaks."

Two more singles were released preceding the album: "Fell Asleep in the Sun" on August 14, 2026 and "Blind" on September 4, 2026. Fell Asleep in the Sun was released on September 18, 2026 under Mom + Pop Music. The band later embarked on a supporting tour of North America for the album from September to November 2026.

== Critical reception ==
Critical reception to the album was mixed; Backseat Mafia rated it an 86%, calling the album a "welcome dose of pop sunlight", while Pitchfork rated it 5.8/10, calling it "superficially pretty but frustratingly shallow" and describing its songs as "spoiled by flat lyricism and unfulfilling pop arrangements".

== Track listing ==
Credits adapted from Tidal.

Fell Asleep in the Sun track listing
No.	Title	Writer(s)	Producer(s)	Length
1.	"Take Me to Sunrise"	Graham Epstein; Jackson Shanks; Justine Dorsey	Epstein; Shanks	3:14
2.	"Promise (When You Go)"	Darcy Baylis; Epstein; Dorsey	Alex Craig; Baylis; Epstein	3:07
3.	"Metal"	Craig; Epstein; Dorsey	Craig; Epstein	3:18
4.	"Breathe Your Air"	Craig; Epstein; Dorsey	Craig; Epstein	3:16
5.	"Fitfully"	Epstein; Dorsey; Oscar Scheller	Epstein; Scheller	3:01
6.	"Do or Die"	Epstein; Dorsey; Scheller	Epstein; Scheller	2:22
7.	"Blow Out the Candle"	Epstein; Jeff Hazin; Dorsey; Ralph Castelli	Epstein; Hazin; Castelli	3:43
8.	"Secret Love Song"	Craig; Epstein; Dorsey; Lucas Starbuck	Craig; Epstein; Starbuck	1:34
9.	"Open Water"	Epstein; Dorsey; Scheller	Epstein; Scheller	3:21
10.	"Blind"	Baylis; Epstein; Dorsey	Craig; Casey Lagos; Baylis; Epstein	3:09
11.	"Snowburn"	Craig; Epstein; Dorsey	Craig; Epstein	3:38
12.	"If You Don't Know by Now"	Aaron Shadrow; Epstein; Shanks; Dorsey	Shadrow; Epstein; Shanks	3:56
13.	"Fell Asleep in the Sun"	Epstein; Dorsey; Scheller	Epstein; Scheller	3:52
Total length:				41:31

== Release history ==
Region	Release date	Format	Label
Various	September 18, 2026	LP, CD, digital download	Mom + Pop Music
