= Skrape =

American nu metal band

Background information
- Origin: Orlando, Florida, U.S.
- Genres: Nu metal; alternative metal; hard rock
- Years active: 1997–2004; 2005
- Label: RCA
- Past members: Billy Keeton; Mike Lynchard; Brian Milner; Randy Melser; Pete Sison; Will Hunt

Skrape was an American nu metal band formed in Orlando, Florida in 1997. They released two albums, New Killer America (2001) and Up the Dose (2004), before disbanding in 2004 and briefly reuniting in 2005. After twenty-one years of inactivity, the band are currently attempting to reform in 2026 pending the outcome of a legal challenge to vocalist Billy Keeton's use of the band's name.

== History ==
=== Formation and New Killer America (1997–2001) ===
Skrape originally formed in 1997 under the name "Jojo", they later renamed to "Skrape" two years later. Prior to their formation in 1997, members had been involved in acts such as Stuck Mojo and Genitorturers. Drummer Will Hunt said he became inspired to form his own band while touring Europe with Stuck Mojo during late 1996, and seeing how enthusiastic crowds were towards the band Life of Agony, who they were performing alongside. Hunt already knew vocalist Billy Keeton prior to forming the band, and the other members were recruited afterwards. According to Hunt, he and Keeton were influenced by the sound of Deftones when they started Skrape.

The band managed to build up a sizeable following in their local area, despite rarely playing live shows. By the end of 1998, they had written songs that would go on to appear as part of a 7 track demo tape released the following year. After shopping around this demo to various labels, they eventually signed to RCA Records in October 1999. In a 2001 interview, guitarist/keyboardist Brian Milner stated, "Part of that whole story about us being elusive in the beginning was because once we got our deal and started working on our album, we really didn't play (live) for a long time. We did a few shows, then we were gone recording the record and came back in nine or 10 months and played again." He also added that, "The first couple of gigs that we did, I wasn't even in the band yet, and from what I hear, it was pretty awful. Nobody liked it and there were actually people who said, 'Give it up,' stuff like that. They didn't understand the sound yet; it was a few years ago, so there wasn't all this nu-metal that's out now." Skrape were noted for being one of the only major label metal acts from Orlando, an area known at the time for teen pop artists such as Backstreet Boys and NSYNC. Milner recalled "We go to play somewhere in Michigan and people come up to us and say, `Orlando? That's the home of the Backstreet Boys and Disney! It doesn't really have anything to do with what we do." Their 2001 debut New Killer America (produced by Ulrich Wild) featured re-recorded versions of the 7 demo tape songs, along with another 7 new songs. It spawned two singles in "Waste" and "Isolated". Tours with popular metal bands such as Pantera, Slayer and Morbid Angel saw the album sell in excess of 100,000 copies in the US, a relatively low number for a major label group at the time. The album experienced more success in Japan, where it was the twelfth highest selling album of 2001.

=== Up the Dose, disbandment and post-Skrape activities (2004–2005) ===
Their second album Up the Dose was released in 2004 with little support from their label, who had recently been taken over by J Records. Beforehand, the band toured with Soil, Static-X, and Twisted Method. The album had been finished since mid-2003, and the band was set to release "Summer Song" as a single, but the album was pushed back several times, eventually being released in January. Faced with the prospect of releasing a single entitled "Summer Song" in January, they changed the name of the song to "Stand Up (Summer Song)". A couple of months after Up the Dose's release, the band was dropped from the label. Drummer Will Hunt explained "The reason we're gone, along with Hotwire and Eve 6, is because we all shared the same A&R guy, Brian Malouf, who was let go by the label a few days prior to the bands. I'd like to throw out a big, BIG fuck you to the fucking cowards at J (for joke) Records for taking over RCA and not allowing them to promote our band correctly. I'd like to also say to [J Records president] Clive Davis that I've got a nice big hot bowl of dicks for you to eat on when you've got the time. I'd like to thank you personally for killing rock and roll and watering down the music industry with pop trappings and watered-down retro rock." He also hinted at possible future activities with Skrape, but nothing had happened other than a reunion gig in 2005 opening for Dark New Day.

In 2004, Hunt became a member of the supergroup Dark New Day, and then later Evanescence. Guitarist Brian Milner went on to join Dope as their bassist. Billy Keeton has continued to pursue his musical career with various projects, such as the short-lived Blessed in Black (featuring former members of Nothingface). Keeton also has contributed vocals for local Florida cover band Money Shot when not working with former members of Primer 55 Bobby Burns (Soulfly) and Kobie Jackson. Formerly titled Paris is Burning, the three have named the project King Street. Keeton currently is vocalist for Audiotopsy, which features bassist Perry Stern as well as drummer Matthew McDonough and guitarist Greg Tribbett of Mudvayne.

Pete Sison was also in Moneyshot with Keeton for a short period until Slaughter offered Sison a position as a backup bassist for Dana Strum. Sison is also involved with Kentucky rockers Bleeding Black and Waking Season, and continues to write with Billy Keeton in a side project called HoneyHole.

=== Attempted reunion (2026) ===
On March 8, 2026, after more than two decades of inactivity, Keeton announced that Skrape had reunited and were planning on touring and releasing new music..

However, a few days later, music publication Loudwire revealed they had received notice from an attorney representing an undisclosed individual associated with the band’s rights, indicating that a cease and desist has been filed against Keeton regarding his plans for the group. That notice is said to have been filed on February 20, 2026. The attorney in question, Tom Player, of the Florida-based Player Entertainment Law, told the aforementioned publication: “Billy Keeton has gone rogue and does not have the right to unilaterally co-opt the Skrape name.” One week after the cease and desist notice was made public, the official Skrape social media accounts were taken down, putting the status of the band once again in doubt.

On July 19, 2026, it was announced Keeton had formed a new band, Skrapegoat, due to unsuccessfully attempting to resolve the legal rights with former members to use the name Skrape.

== Musical style and influences ==
Skrape is most commonly classified as nu metal. Regarding the band's style and attitude to music, Brian Milner stated in 2001, "Our music is aggressive, but in general we have a good time playing it and we don't walk around being depressed all the time. We just do what we do. We play rock 'n' roll. There's a new generation of kids, the whole depressing Pearl Jam era is over." AllMusic praised the band's "bright and intelligent approach to hard rock" on New Killer America. The website lists their influences as being Iron Maiden, Kiss, Metallica, Ozzy Osbourne and Pantera. Vocalist Billy Keeton has mentioned some of his musical inspirations as being Frank Sinatra, Ronnie James Dio, Queens of the Stone Age and Godflesh.

== Members ==
- Billy Keeton – lead vocals (1997–2004)
- Brian "Brix" Milner – guitar, keyboard, turntables, backing vocals (1997–2004)
- Pete Sison – bass (1997–2004)
- Will Hunt – drums, backing vocals (1997–2004)
- Mike Lynchard – guitar (2000–2002)
- Randy Melser – guitar (2002–2004)

== Discography ==
=== Albums ===
Album information
New Killer America
- Released: March 20, 2001 (U.S.)
- Label: RCA Records
- Chart Positions: No. 157 (Billboard 200)
- US Sales: 100,000+
Up the Dose
- Released: January 13, 2004 (U.S.)
- Label: RCA Records
- Chart Positions: No. 19 (Top Heatseekers)
- US Sales: -

=== Singles ===
Year	Song	U.S. Modern Rock	U.S. Mainstream Rock	Album
2001	"Isolated"	-	35	New Killer America
2001	"Waste"	-	29	New Killer America
2004	"Stand Up (Summer Song)"	-	34	Up the Dose

=== Videography ===
- "New Killer America EPK" (2000)
- "Waste" (2000)
- "What You Say" (2001)
- "Up the Dose" (2004) [Cancelled]
