= Will Hunt =

American drummer (born 1971)

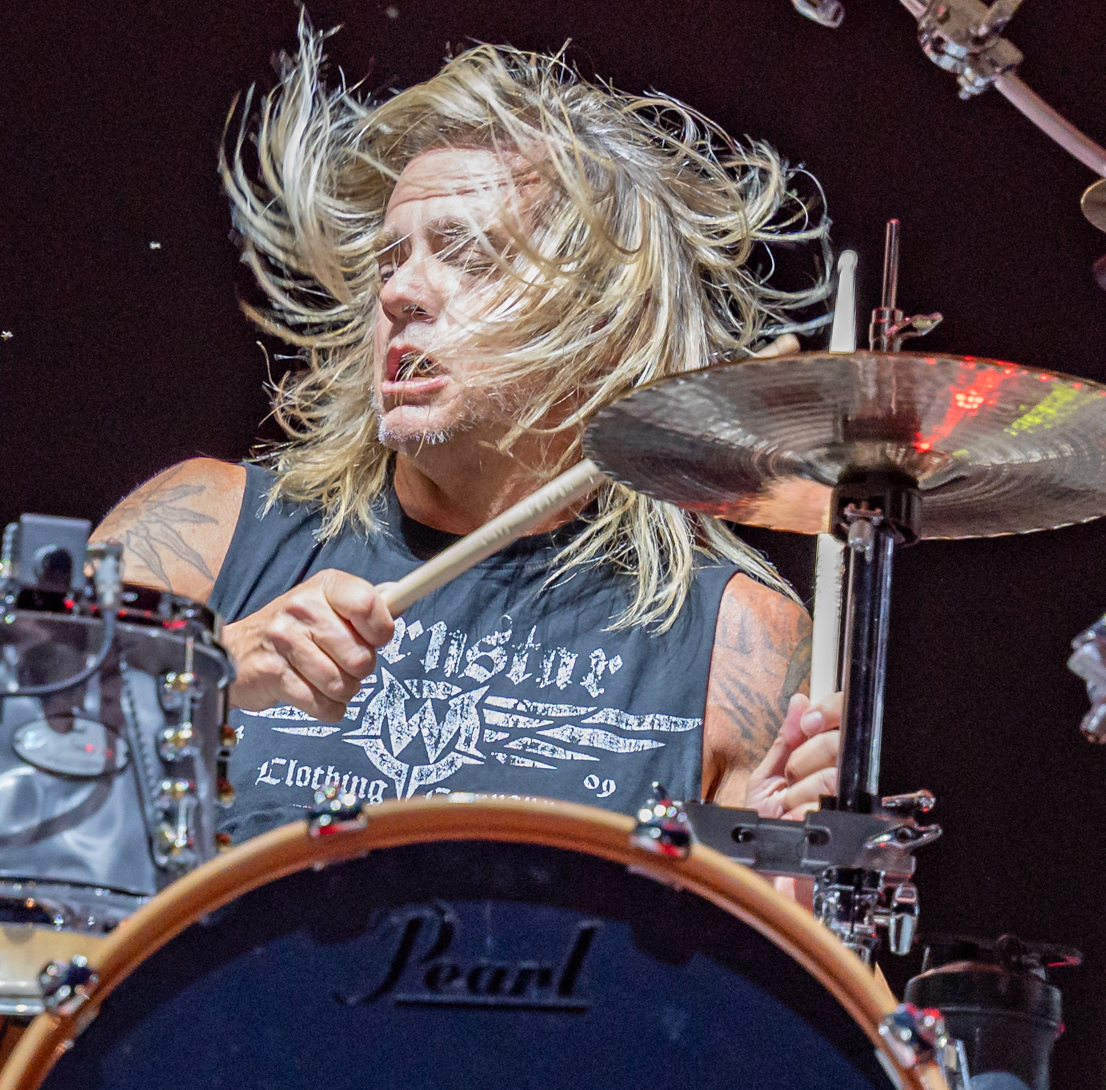
- Hunt performing with Evanescence in 2023

Background information
- Born: September 5, 1971 (age 54); Gainesville, Florida, U.S.
- Genres: Alternative metal; nu metal; hard rock
- Occupation: Drummer
- Member of: Evanescence; Heroes and Monsters
- Formerly of: Black Label Society; Crossfade; Eye Empire; Dark New Day; Skrape; Methods of Mayhem

William Hunt (born September 5, 1971) is an American drummer. He has been a member of rock band Evanescence since 2007, and has also played for Skrape, Dark New Day, Black Label Society, Vasco Rossi, Device, Crossfade, Staind, Static-X, Slaughter, and Godsmack.

== Career ==
He looks up to Tommy Lee, John Bonham, Peter Criss, Abe Cunningham, and Stewart Copeland as his influences to his drumming.

One of Hunt's earliest bands was Axe Attack, formed during 1988 in Tallahassee, Florida. He was also the second drummer in Tallahassee band Witt's End, a cover band that played several club gigs. This was the first band for all the members of Witt's End that earned them a living, making it the first professional band for all of them. Amongst sitting in with other local North Florida bands, he was also in the band Eli and recorded Push It Hard in 1990.

Hunt while recording the debut album Indestructible loved the direction the album was going and Phillip Calfy vocalist for Scars of Amber had asked Hunt about taking up permanent member status in the project and Hunt Agreed. Hunt would bring in fellow Device bandmate Virus on guitar who has played for Dope and Lords of Acid and on bass Dave Benedict from the Canadian band Default also mention of Baxter Teal deepfield on guitars and Phillips brother Steven Calfy Ronin Starr on bass and Guitar back ups. The Debut album was released on November 24, 2015,

One of the first prominent bands Hunt joined was Stuck Mojo, which he was briefly with in his mid-20s. Hunt then co-founded the band Skrape. They originally formed under the name "Jojo" in 1997, by members of the Orlando heavy music scene. Skrape released two major label albums in the early 2000s, New Killer America and Up the Dose. In 2004, Skrape was dropped from RCA Records, and disbanded shortly afterward.

Hunt helped form Dark New Day in 2004. Their debut album Twelve Year Silence, was released in 2005. They recorded their second album, Hail Mary in 2008, although due to band members' involvement with other projects, the album was not released until 2013. The group is currently inactive, with no known plans of returning.

Hunt has been involved with several bands on a temporary basis as a recording or live member. During 2007, Hunt recorded with Bloodsimple. In 2008, Hunt filled in for Tommy Lee in Mötley Crüe for several dates when Lee suffered from tendinitis. Hunt joined Tommy Lee's rap metal side-project Methods of Mayhem as the drummer for their 2010 A Public Disservice Announcement album. Though he was set to appear with the band on tour promoting the album, he was replaced with Sevendust drummer Morgan Rose.

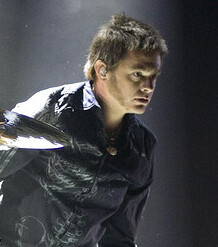
Hunt performing with Evanescence in 2009

It was announced in 2010 that Hunt would be the new drummer for Crossfade's third album, We All Bleed. It was confirmed Hunt's involvement was only temporary due to Crossfade's announcement of Mark Castillo joining on drums. He also toured with Static-X after the departure of Nick Oshiro.

In December 2010, Hunt was named as the new drummer for Eye Empire. He replaced original Empire drummer Garrett Whitlock, but left in 2011.

In May 2011, it was announced that Hunt would be taking over drumming duties for the scheduled Staind tour dates, taking place of the original drummer, Jon Wysocki, who had recently left. In February 2013, he recorded with the band SOiL for their 2013 album Whole. Hunt has also played live with Slaughter and Vince Neil. Hunt recorded drums on Stryper frontman Michael Sweet's 2016 solo album One Sided War.

In May 2007, Hunt was named as a replacement for the departed Rocky Gray of Evanescence, and remained with the group through their The Open Door album tour, which ended in December 2007. He remained active with Dark New Day while playing with Evanescence. Hunt performed with Evanescence in their 2009 one-off show at the Maquinaria Festival in São Paulo, Brazil. In February 2010, Hunt rejoined Evanescence when the band started pre-production of their self-titled third album. After touring in 2011 and 2012, Evanescence decided to take an extended break before returning to the stage in 2016 and beginning work on a new remix album. Synthesis was released in 2017 and Hunt embarked on tour with the band throughout 2018, including a joint tour with violinist Lindsey Stirling. In 2020, Will worked on the band's fourth album, The Bitter Truth.

Hunt was a member of Black Label Society from 2010 to 2011, recording Order of the Black with the band. In 2011, he left due to his commitment to Evanescence.

It was announced in January 2013 that Hunt would be a band member for David Draiman's new project, Device. The band is no longer active as of January 2015.

In 2013, Hunt contributed drums to White Noise Owl's EP Until We Meet Again which was produced by Ben Grosse and features musicians Pete Murray of Lo-Pro on vocals, John Fahnestock on bass, and Chris Shy on guitar. The EP was released on March 11, 2014.

On March 1, 2014, Hunt joined the Vasco Rossi band for the live tour Live Kom014 - Cambia-menti. On February 14, 2016, he joined Jeff Gutt's band Rival City Heights for the tour with Trapt.

In 2025, Hunt filled in for Shannon Larkin on Godsmack's 2025 European tour.

== Equipment ==
Hunt uses Pearl Drums, Vater drum sticks, Zildjian cymbals and Remo drumheads.

== Discography ==
=== Eli ===
- Push It Hard (1990)

=== Skrape ===
- New Killer America (March 20, 2001)
- Up the Dose (January 13, 2004)

=== Tommy Lee ===
- Never a Dull Moment (May 21, 2002)

=== Dark New Day ===
- Twelve Year Silence (June 14, 2005)
- Black Porch (Acoustic Sessions) (September 5, 2006)
- B-Sides (August 24, 2011)
- New Tradition (February 28, 2012)
- Hail Mary (February 19, 2013)

=== Bloodsimple ===
- Red Harvest (October 30, 2007)

=== Black Label Society ===
- Order of the Black (August 10, 2010)

=== Methods of Mayhem ===
- A Public Disservice Announcement (September 21, 2010)

=== Crossfade ===
- We All Bleed (June 21, 2011)

=== Evanescence ===
- Evanescence (2011)
- Synthesis (2017)
- The Bitter Truth (2021)
- Sanctuary (2026)

=== SOiL ===
- Whole (August 16, 2013)

=== White Noise Owl ===
- Until We Meet Again (March 11, 2014)

=== Michael Sweet ===
- One Sided War (August 26, 2016)
- Ten (2019)

=== Gus G ===
- Fearless (April 20, 2018)

=== Vasco Rossi ===
- Tutto In Una Notte - Live Kom 015 (2016)
