= New Killer America =

Studio album by Skrape
- Released: March 20, 2001
- Recorded: 2000, Orlando, FL
- Genre: Nu metal
- Length: 44:42
- Label: RCA
- Producer: Ulrich Wild

Skrape chronology
New Killer America (2001)	Up the Dose (2004)

New Killer America is the debut album by the five-piece nu metal/alternative metal music group Skrape. The album was released on March 20, 2001 via RCA Records.

== Background, recording and promotion ==
Skrape were signed to RCA Records in October 1999, and commenced recording their debut New Killer America in 2000. They had originally formed in Orlando, Florida during 1997 under the name "Jojo", having only played a small number of shows together prior to getting signed. Once signed, the band played no shows over the next nine to ten months, as they spent this period of time focusing on the making of the album. The songs "Broken Knees", "Blow Up", "Goodbye", "Kill Control", "Sunshine", "Waste" and "What You Say" were all rerecorded for New Killer America, having previously appeared on the 1999 demo which caught the attention of RCA Records.

The album was recorded at the same Orlando studio that was being used by teen pop artists such as Britney Spears and NSYNC. Regarding the making of the album, guitarist/keyboardist Brian Milner stated in April 2001 "We had most of the songs done and then we did preproduction and met with Ulrich Wild. He came to Orlando where we live and spent a few weeks going over the songs and getting them ready. He was like, ‘Look, this is going to go on a recording forever. This is your first album, so make sure it’s what you want to come out.’ We did a lot of preproduction, worked it out and did what I think is a pretty kickass record." The rerecorded versions of the 7 demo tape songs featured more of a synthesizer-laden sound, which could also be heard on new songs created for the album, such as "Isolated". Drummer Will Hunt later said, "with the keyboards, we didn't want to be industrial, we wanted to be more like if the Deftones had a car-wreck with The Cars."

The album had already been completed by the summer of 2000, and was originally scheduled to be released that year, despite eventually being released in the spring of 2001. A music video for the single "Waste" was filmed in 2000. It shows the band performing in a dark venue intercut with gory footage and images of a shooting target. A much rarer video for "What You Say" was also produced in 2001, depicting a live performance intercut with anime scenes.

To support the album, Skrape went on an American tour with Disturbed, which began on March 16, 2001. Later in 2001, Skrape embarked on the Extreme Steel Tour of North America, with Morbid Angel, Pantera, Slayer and Static-X. The tour was Pantera's last in America prior to their original breakup. On August 19, 2001, Skrape performed at the second day of the Summer Sonic Festival in Japan. Due to their popularity in the country, they featured as one of the main acts on the first stage, with The Cult opening for them at the festival, despite being much more well-known than Skrape in America. That year's lineup also included Beck, Cibo Matto, Incubus, Marilyn Manson, Seo Taiji, Slipknot, The Living End and The Strokes, among others.

== Title and artwork ==
When asked about the album's title, bassist Pete Sison remarked in a March 2001 interview that "It represents the new generation of kids today. Kids today are more open minded, and are much smarter than we give them credit for at the age of 13. Most parents are blind to this. You have kids hacking computers and shutting down million dollar companies nowadays. That's the new generation — that's the new killer America."

The art direction of the album was handled by Tracy Boychuk, with photography by Dan Winters. Boychuk was also the art director for The Strokes' album Is This It, which was released later in 2001 on RCA. The cover artwork features a closeup shot of one of the infected fingers of Lorin Finkelstein, an RCA executive. In a 2018 interview, vocalist Billy Keeton recalled "we were all just blown away and mesmerized by how his hands looked at that time. I think there was some kind of medical thing going on." Winters captured the photo of Finkelstein's finger while he was sitting down on a table. Hunt said, "we looked at each other and said 'that's it, that's the fucking cover'. It exerts a reaction. You see that and your skin crawls. That thing was all over Best Buys around the country, and as disgusting as it was, it worked." The photo was captured the same day they were taking other gory photos used throughout the album's booklet, including shots of animal guts.

== Commercial performance ==
The two singles "Waste" and "Isolated" received some airplay in the United States during 2001, with "Isolated" being picked up by the popular Florida station WJRR. By the beginning of June 2001, the album had sold 50,000 copies. It went on to sell approximately 100,000+ units in the United States, a relatively low number for a major label act at the time. The album was more of a success in Japan. "Isolated" was a big hit in the country, and New Killer America would end up becoming the twelfth highest selling album of 2001 in Japan. When RCA Japan initially sent out promo copies of the album with its original artwork, stores refused to sell it. An alternate anime-influenced cover was going to be used in Japan instead, but the band rejected this idea and insisted the original artwork be used, which would end up being the case in Japan.

== Reception ==
Professional ratings
Review scores
Source	Rating
AllMusic	2.5/5 stars
Sputnikmusic	4/5 stars

AllMusic's Jeremy Ervins praised the record's "bright and intelligent approach to hard rock" and "mysterious aura", writing "The band's energy seems to be directed toward song craftsmanship; every song flows very nicely and has its own distinct vibe, while sticking to the overall concept of the album. The guitars tends to sound slightly dry and dull from time to time, which can relate to the lack of creative range in the heavy hard rock genre. New Killer America is obviously intended to quell this obstacle, as it does with much style and grace on most tracks -- especially "Sleep," a very melodic tune that, despite its title, really awakens the senses toward the end of the album." In their review, Guitar World stated the album "fuses brutal metallic riffs, Deftones-inspired swirl [and] impassioned growls that evoke Alice in Chains' most painful moments." In June 2001, Mark Padgett of the Orlando Weekly called it "a sure-footed strike, fueled by punishing power chords, touches of techno-synth and tough-guy themes." antiMusic gave the album a positive review in May 2001, stating "this album is 40+ minutes of straight ahead heavy rock. Melody mixed with screaming, not a bad break from the annoyance levels of today's current roster of heavy rock bands", adding "[I hope] they don't turn into the next Disturbed (or Papa Roach, or Head PE), because that would be a tremendous waste of musical talent."

Jeffrey M. Barr of The Lantern wrote on June 18, 2001 that "the CD is easy to find at the local record shop because of its gross and disturbing cover of an infected toenail. Then there is the music that comes off as loud and intense. And then the band becomes instantly recognizable." Barr said that the track "Goodbye" sounded "[almost] identical to the band Filter's style of music", adding that "it's an enjoyable song and one of the band's best tracks." He concluded his review by stating that "Skrape is not the most original band to come around, but they do have a sound that many people will like." In his March 2001 review, Adam Pugh of the Arizona Daily Wildcat gave it a C rating, writing "Skrape tries to pretend that it has made something new. In reality, it has ripped off the vocals of Chino Moreno from the Deftones and shamelessly stolen Korn's guitarists." He added, "the music, despite its 'borrowed' status, is very well done, incorporating punchy rhythms and exhilarating screams. The vocals are clean, something which makes the band sound great, but each song sounds like a band we've all heard before." Dan McQuade of 34th Street also critiqued their lack of originality in his July 2001 review. McQuade added "Skrape has very few things going for them. One thing they are excellent at is album packaging. Their album has to be one of the cleverest uses of packaging ever. While their album packaging is well done, it is sad that the packaging is the best part of New Killer America."

=== Legacy ===
The song "What You Say" appeared in the 2001 videogame Project Gotham Racing, while "Waste" was featured in 2001's ESPN X-Games Skateboarding. In 2017, Spin ranked "Waste" as the 29th greatest nu metal song of all time.

== Track listing ==
All songs are written by Skrape.

1. "What You Say" – 3:22
2. "Waste" – 3:29
3. "Goodbye" – 3:27
4. "Isolated" – 3:55
5. "Rise" – 2:57
6. "Sunshine" – 3:59
7. "Rake" – 3:18
8. "I Know" – 3:53
9. "Kill Control" – 4:15
10. "Broken Knees" – 4:05
11. "Sleep" – 3:22
12. "Blow Up" – 4:37
- The Japanese version of the album features 2 bonus tracks, "No" and "Virgin"

== Personnel ==
Skrape

- William Keeton – lead vocals
- Michael William Lynchard – guitar
- Brian Christopher Milner – guitar, keyboards, backing vocals
- Pete Sison – bass
- Will Hunt – drums, backing vocals

Production

- Ulrich Wild – producer, engineering, mixing (1, 3–12)
- Brian Malouf – mixing (2)
- Danny Harrell – assistant engineering
- Michelle Forbes – assistant mixing
- Tom Baker – mastering
