= After EP 2 =

EP by After
- Released: October 17, 2025
- Genres: Trip hop; electropop; chillwave
- Length: 20:39
- Label: Mom + Pop
- Producers: Graham Epstein; Jeff Hazin; Ralph Castelli; Franco Reid; Oscar Scheller; Alex Craig; Cowboy Lansky; Dillon Reed; Photographic Memory

After chronology
After EP (2025)	After EP 2 (2025)	Fell Asleep in the Sun (2026)

Singles from After EP 2
- 1. "Deep Diving" Released: June 18, 2025; 2. "Outbound" Released: August 29, 2025

After EP 2 is the second extended play by American pop duo After. It was released on October 17, 2025, through Mom + Pop Music. The album was preceded by two singles: "Deep Diving" and "Outbound"; another single, "The Story", which released on November 12, 2024, was included as a bonus track on a compilation vinyl pressing released on February 20, 2026, titled EP1 + EP2, which combines their first EP, After EP, and After EP 2 together.

== Critical reception ==
The EP received mixed critical reception; Steffanee Wang of The Fader called the EP's tracks "songs meant to lubricate your brain" and "a mimicry of something that's so nuanced and studied it becomes its own kind of original", while Billie Bugara of Pitchfork rated both After EP and After EP 2 a combined 4.5 out of 10, calling the EPs "limp and unimaginative rehashes" of the early 2000s and describing them as "pop’s Crystal Pepsi—a gloriously ephemeral product of our memories that came back tasting like absolutely nothing".

== Track listing ==
After EP 2 track listing
No.	Title	Length
1.	"Deep Diving"	3:22
2.	"The Field"	3:28
3.	"Where Are We Now"	3:18
4.	"Baroque"	3:26
5.	"Outbound"	3:47
6.	"Close Your Eyes"	3:17
Total length:		20:39

== Release history ==
Region	Release date	Format	Label
Various	October 17, 2025	LP, CD, digital download	Mom + Pop Music
