= Australia (Howie Day album) =

Studio album by Howie Day
- Released: November 1, 2000
- Recorded: During his tour in 2000
- Genre: Pop rock; alternative rock
- Length: 42:49; 44:19 (including hidden track)
- Label: Daze (original release); Epic (2002 re-issue)
- Producer: Howie Day; Mike Denneen

Howie Day chronology
Australia (2000)	Stop All the World Now (2003)

Singles from Australia
- 1. "Ghost" Released: June 10, 2002; 2. "Sorry So Sorry" Released: November 18, 2002

Professional ratings
Review scores
Source	Rating
Allmusic	4/5 stars
Blender	2/5 stars
Rolling Stone	3/5 stars

Australia is the debut studio album by American singer-songwriter Howie Day. It was first released on November 1, 2000, independently via Daze Records. It would be re-issued in 2002 by Epic Records. It was produced by Day and Mike Denneen and was written entirely by Day. The album, when re-issued by Epic, spawned him his first hit in his debut single, "Ghost", which became his first top ten on the US Billboard Adult Alternative Airplay chart at number nine. Australia peaked at number 18 on the Heatseekers Albums.

The song "She Says" would later be re-recorded for Day's next studio album, Stop All the World Now (2003), in which it would become a single.

== Track listing ==
Track 11 was removed from the 2002 Epic re-release.

All tracks are written by Howie Day.

Original track listing
No.	Title	Length
1.	"Sorry So Sorry"	4:34
2.	"She Says"	4:34
3.	"Secret"	3:46
4.	"Slow Down"	3:40
5.	"Ghost"	5:26
6.	"Kristina"	5:11
7.	"Everything Else"	3:21
8.	"More You Understand"	4:52
9.	"Morning After"	3:37
10.	"Disco"	3:40
11.	"Untitled" (hidden track)	1:32
Total length:		44:19

== Personnel ==
Taken from the album booklet.

- Howie Day – guitar, keyboard, vocals
- Josh Lattanzi – bass
- Steve Scully – percussion, drums
- Ed Valauskas – bass on "Everything Else"
- Dave Wanamaker – guitar, vocals

== Charts ==
=== Album ===
Weekly chart performance for Australia
Chart (2002)	Peak position
US Heatseekers Albums (Billboard)	18

=== Singles ===
"Ghost" ended at numbers 44 and 46 on the 2002 year-end charts for Billboard and Radio & Records.

Single	Year	Peak chart positions	
Single	Year	Billboard Triple A	Radio & Records Triple-A
"Ghost"	2002	9	8
"Sorry So Sorry"	2002	—	— (Note: "Sorry So Sorry" did not enter the Radio & Records Triple-A chart but did peak at number three on the "New & Active" section for the chart.)
