= Up the Dose =

Studio album by Skrape
- Released: January 13, 2004
- Recorded: 2003
- Studio: Hit Factory Criteria (Miami)
- Genres: Nu metal, alternative metal
- Length: 39:55
- Label: RCA
- Producer: James "Jimbo" Barton

Skrape chronology
New Killer America (2001)	Up the Dose (2004)

Professional ratings
Review scores
Source	Rating
AllMusic	2.5/5 stars
Melodic.net	3.5/5 stars
Sputnikmusic	3/5 stars

Up the Dose is the second and final album by the five-piece Orlando metal group Skrape. It was released in 2004 by RCA Records, with the breaking up shortly afterwards after getting dropped by the label.

== Release ==
It was released on January 13, 2004, after initially being scheduled for a September 2003 release. The album still has a 2003 copyright date on the back of the CD, as is treated as a 2003 album on some websites, such as AllMusic and Spotify.

== Reception ==
Allmusic's Johnny Loftus gave the album two and a half stars, stating that it tries to "build fully on the promise of "Goodbye" and "Kill Control" from 2001's New Killer America, tracks that cracked the nu-metal mold with stratospheric vocals from Billy Keeton and slight twinges of Deftones psychedelics." He praised the song "Syrup", calling it an "atmospheric later-album track that leaves plenty of empty space around its spidery guitars and plodding percussion, capitalizing the chorus when it finally lurches into gear. The song slides in the slime between early Soundgarden and modern metal, and its final, aggressive tempo change only makes it more effective."

Ink19.com's Nick Plante referred to the album as "the heavy metal equivalent of Kelly Clarkson" in August 2004, writing "It’s formulaic, hook-heavy modern metal where as much input came from RCA’s marketing department as did from the musicians themselves." The Orlando Sentinel gave the album a similarly mixed review in January 2004, noting "These songs sound awfully familiar, despite all the talk from singer Billy Keeton and his Skrape cohorts about how the band is pushing boundaries on its sophomore album. Instead, Orlando's homegrown major-label addition to the nu-metal aesthetic is back with a predictable though solid regurgitation of the power chords and angst of 2001's New Killer America."

== Track listing ==
No.	Title	Length
1.	"Bleach"	3:20
2.	"Stand Up (Summer Song)"	3:53
3.	"Up the Dose"	3:10
4.	"In the End"	2:57
5.	"My Life"	2:55
6.	"I Can't Breathe"	4:51
7.	"The Ocean"	4:02
8.	"Searching for Home"	3:18
9.	"Syrup"	4:39
10.	"Habit"	3:42
11.	"No Respect"	3:02
Total length:		39:55

== Credits ==
- William Keeton - lead vocals
- Brian Christopher Milner - guitar, keyboards, backing vocals
- Pete Sison - bass
- Will Hunt - drums, backing vocals
- Randy Melser - guitar

Production

- James Barton - producer, engineering, mixing
- Ted Jensen - mastering
- The Japanese version of the album includes a bonus track called "You Got What You Wanted". Other songs from the recording sessions are called "Determination" and "So Many Things", which have surfaced online.
