= Singing Melody =

Jamaican reggae singer and producer

- Born: 23 November 1967 (age 58)
- Origin: Kingston, Jamaica
- Genres: Reggae, R&B
- Years active: 1988–present
- Labels: S.H.E.M. Music Productions / VP Records
- Website: singingmelodymusic.com

Everton Hardweare (born 23 November 1967), better known by his stage name Singing Melody, is a reggae artist from Kingston, Jamaica. He is known for his abilities as a vocalist, his production work and for combining aspects of reggae and R&B in his own releases.

== Biography ==
Everton Hardweare grew up in Kingston, Jamaica. In the 1980s, he met well-known reggae/dub producer King Tubby. Tubby produced his first single, "Tie Me," which was released on Firehouse in 1987. He then caught the attention of production duo Steely & Clevie, who produced his first hit, a reggae cover of the R&B single "Shower Me with Your Love" by Surface.

In 1990, Melody recorded the Japanese language single "Sayonara Tokyo" for Sony Music Japan, and was subsequently booked to perform at a concert in Japan. Based on the success of the single and concert, Melody signed with Parish Records and released his first LP, titled Original, in 1992, which was distributed by the Queens-based record label VP Records.

Singing Melody found widespread success with his sophomore LP Sweeter, which was released by VP Records in 1999. The single "Want You Back" reached No. 1 on the Jamaica Star's reggae/dancehall chart, and the music video for the song reached the No. 2 position on the MTV2 playlist. The song also won "Song of the Year" at the 1999 Reggae/Soca Music Awards. Melody also won the "Best Male Vocalist International" award at the 12th annual Tamika Reggae Awards.

In the 2000s, he began producing tracks for artists including Morgan Heritage, Richie Stephens, and Turbulence. He started his own label, S.H.E.M. Music Productions, and helped promote the annual Kingston reggae concert "Symphony Under the Stars." In 2002, Singing Melody released his third LP, Expressions, on VP Records.

Singing Melody released his fourth LP, They Call Me Mr. Melody, on 17 January 2012. It will be released on S.H.E.M. Music/Fat Eyes and distributed by VP Records. The first single from the album is "Collide", a cover of the Howie Day song of the same name. The single reached the No. 1 position on the Top 20 music chart for Aruba. The album includes productions from Donovan Germain, Tony "CD" Kelly, Lynford "Fatta" Marshall, and others.

== L.U.S.T. ==
In the 2000s, Singing Melody formed the reggae group L.U.S.T with Lukie D, Thriller U, and Tony Curtis. They have released two albums, Sweetness of Your Love in 2007 and Inspiration in 2010.

== Discography ==
List of albums, with selected details
Title	Album details
Original	Released: 1991; Label: Parish Records; Distribution: VP Records
Sweeter	Released: 2 February 1999; Label: VP Records
Expressions	Released: 27 August 2002; Label: VP Records
They Call Me Mr. Melody	Released: 17 January 2012; Label: S.H.E.M. Music/Fat Eyes; Distribution: VP Records
The Next Chapter	Released: 16 October 2020; Label: S.H.E.M. Music Productions/ Your Friend In Music; Distribution: Tuff Gong International
