= Crossfade (album) =

Studio album by Crossfade
- Released: April 13, 2004
- Recorded: 2003
- Studio: Sugarstar Studios (West Columbia, South Carolina)
- Genres: Post-grunge, nu metal
- Length: 34:06
- Label: Columbia
- Producer: Crossfade

Crossfade chronology
| Crossfade (2004) | Falling Away (2006) |

Singles from Crossfade
- 1. "Cold" Released: January 26, 2004; 2. "So Far Away" Released: March 25, 2005; 3. "Colors" Released: May 24, 2005

Professional ratings
Review scores
| Source | Rating |
|---|---|
| AllMusic | 2.5/5 stars |

Crossfade is the debut album by American rock band Crossfade. It was released on April 13, 2004, by Columbia. The album reached number 41 on the Billboard 200 and spawned three singles: "Cold", "So Far Away", and "Colors". It was certified platinum by the Recording Industry Association of America (RIAA), denoting sales of over a million copies in that country.

In 2025, Lauryn Schaffner of Loudwire named the album the best post-grunge release of 2004.

== Release ==
It was released on April 13, 2004. It was also released as a DualDisc CD that includes extra content not found on the original, standard edition. Due to Columbia lacking the funds to release separate clean and explicit versions of the album, however, all existing copies of it have profanity removed on the tracks "Starless", "Death Trend Setta", and "Disco", allowing it to be sold in stores such as Walmart, which had a strict no-swearing policy at the time. No explicit version was ever made. The album was certified Platinum in the United States.

The singles from this album helped launch the band to mainstream success. "Cold" remains the band's biggest hit, reaching number two on the Modern Rock Tracks chart and number three on the Mainstream Rock Tracks, and is also their only single to chart on the Billboard Hot 100, at number 81. Follow-up singles "So Far Away" and "Colors" charted in the top 10 of the Mainstream Rock chart, at number four and number six, respectively. They also hit the top 20 of the Modern Rock chart ("So Far Away" at number 14, "Colors" at number 18).

== Track listing ==
All tracks written by Ed Sloan.

| No. | Title | Length |
|---|---|---|
| 1. | "Starless" | 3:55 |
| 2. | "Cold" | 3:14 |
| 3. | "So Far Away" | 3:25 |
| 4. | "Colors" | 3:18 |
| 5. | "Death Trend Setta" | 3:34 |
| 6. | "The Deep End" | 3:23 |
| 7. | "No Giving Up" | 3:34 |
| 8. | "Dead Skin" | 3:50 |
| 9. | "Disco" | 2:57 |
| 10. | "The Unknown" | 2:59 |
| Total length: | | 34:06 |

Bonus tracks
| No. | Title | Length |
|---|---|---|
| 11. | "Cold" (acoustic version) | 3:20 |
| 12. | "Cold" (DeeTown remix featuring Miss Eighty 6) | 3:18 |

== Personnel ==
Crossfade

- Ed Sloan – lead vocals, guitar
- Tony Byroads – turntables, sampling, co-lead vocals (on "Cold", "Colors, "Death Trend Setta," "The Deep End," "Dead Skin" and "Disco"), backing vocals
- Mitchell James – bass, backing vocals
- Brian Geiger – drums, percussion

Production

- Crossfade – producer, engineer, art direction
- Doug Ford – A&R
- Bryan Gallant – mixing assistant
- Matt Pinfield – A&R
- Mick Rock – photography
- Randy Staub – mixing

== Charts ==
=== Weekly charts ===
Weekly chart performance for Crossfade
| Chart (2004–2005) | Peak position |
|---|---|
| US Billboard 200 | 41 |
| US Heatseekers Albums (Billboard) | 1 |

=== Year-end charts ===
Year-end chart performance for Crossfade
| Chart (2005) | Position |
|---|---|
| US Billboard 200 | 79 |

== Certifications ==
Certifications for Crossfade
| Region | Certification | Certified units/sales |
|---|---|---|
| United States (RIAA) | Platinum | 1,000,000^{^} |
^{^} Shipments figures based on certification alone.
