= After EP =

EP by After
- Released: April 4, 2025
- Genres: Trip hop; electropop; chillwave
- Length: 16:17
- Labels: 7th Heaven; Ultraworld
- Producers: Alex Craig; Photographic Memory; Cowboy Lansky; Oscar Scheller

After chronology
After EP (2025)	After EP 2 (2025)

Singles from After EP
- 1. "Obvious" Released: March 5, 2024; 2. "Ever" Released: January 12, 2025; 3. "300 Dreams" Released: March 14, 2025

After EP is the debut extended play by American pop duo After. It was released on April 4, 2025, through 7th Heaven and Ultraworld. The album was preceded by three singles: "Obvious", "Ever", and "300 Dreams".

== Critical reception ==
The EP received limited but mixed critical reception; Sydney Brasil of Exclaim named it a Staff Pick and described it as "what happens when the cool kids make bubblegum pop", while Billie Bugara of Pitchfork panned the EP, saying, "After's lifeless consistency gives little impression that time travel is any fun."

== Track listing ==
After EP track listing
No.	Title	Length
1.	"300 Dreams"	3:09
2.	"Ever"	3:01
3.	"Lichen"	3:01
4.	"Obvious"	3:30
5.	"Nothingmore"	3:36
Total length:		16:17

== Release history ==
Region	Release date	Format	Label
Various	April 4, 2025	LP, CD, digital download	7th Heaven, Ultraworld
