= Crossfade (American band) =

American rock band

- Also known as: The Nothing (1991–2000); Sugardaddy Superstar (2000–2002)
- Origin: Columbia, South Carolina, U.S.
- Genres: Alternative rock; alternative metal; post-grunge; nu metal (early)
- Years active: 1991–2012; 2024–present
- Labels: Eleven Seven; Columbia
- Members: Ed Sloan; Mitch James; Les Hall
- Past members: Brian Geiger; Tony Byroads; James Branham; Mark Castillo

Crossfade is an American rock band formed in Columbia, South Carolina, in 1991. Before settling on the Crossfade name in 2002, the band had previously existed under the names The Nothing and Sugardaddy Superstar. Their current lineup includes lead vocalist and rhythm guitarist Ed Sloan, bassist and backing vocalist Mitch James, lead guitarist, keyboardist, and backing vocalist Les Hall. Since their formation, Crossfade has released three studio albums – their self-titled debut album in 2004, Falling Away in 2006, and We All Bleed in 2011.

AllMusic describes their sound as "raw yet radio-friendly," incorporating "heavy riffage [and] emotional lyrics" into their post-grunge and alternative metal style.

== History ==
=== Early years, Crossfade and Falling Away (1991–2007) ===
Crossfade was formed in 1991, originally under the name The Nothing. The band consisted of Ed Sloan on lead vocals and guitar, and Mitch James on bass and backing vocals, later being joined by Brian Geiger on drums in 1992, and DJ Tony Byroads on percussion and backup vocals in 1996. They released two records, The Nothing (1994) and Numb (1998). The song "Breathing Slowly", originally from Numb, was re-recorded eight years later on Falling Away. By 1999, The Nothing had changed their name to Sugardaddy Superstar. The band recorded songs in the "Sugardaddy Studio", a studio that lead singer Ed Sloan had built in his garage. The songs eventually attracted the interest of the Los Angeles A&R company Taxi (Independent A&R), and HitPredictor co-founder and FG Records/Earshot head Doug Ford which ultimately led to the signing of a record deal with the FG Records/Earshot division of Columbia Records.

In 2002, they changed their name once again, this time to Crossfade. That year the band entered the studio to record two more songs to add to the eight they had recorded in the "Sugardaddy Studio" for their debut album. Brian Geiger left the band before the album was released, and was replaced by James Branham. They released their first album, Crossfade, on April 13, 2004. The first single off the album, "Cold", gave the band significant mainstream exposure. Two singles followed afterward in 2005: "So Far Away" and "Colors". In February 2005, their Crossfade album was certified Gold by the RIAA and was later certified Platinum in August 2005. Crossfade had with "So Far Away" their debut radio broadcast on 94.5 the Buzz (Houston, Texas) Cage Match at 10 o'clock p.m. where it competed with a new song every night and won out over the competition for over three weeks. At the time, Crossfade's single had been the longest lasting song on the Cage Match since its founding. That year, Tony Byroads left the band after a religious experience, and rising tensions regarding creative differences amongst himself and Ed Sloan.

After coming off the success of their first album, the band began to write a follow-up. Crossfade's second album, Falling Away, was released on August 29, 2006. The album spawned three singles: "Invincible", "Drown You Out", and "Already Gone". After releasing the album, they needed another guitarist for their upcoming tour. Les Hall, an old friend of Ed Sloan, filled the position. After touring, Hall wanted to become an official member of the band and he asked if he could take part in the songwriting. Sloan accepted and Les Hall became Crossfade's lead guitarist and keyboardist. Though their debut album sold over one million copies, Falling Away only sold 200,000.

=== We All Bleed and later years (2008–present) ===
In 2008, the band was dropped from Columbia Records. The band signed with Eleven Seven Music. After drummer James Branham left and formed a new band, A Fall From Down, he was replaced by temporary member Will Hunt for the recording of the album.

On January 2, 2009, Crossfade released a demo track entitled "We All Bleed". It was announced that they would be releasing a new album later that year. According to the band, the new album would have a darker, and possibly different, sound than their previous releases.

In June 2010, the track listing for We All Bleed was revealed, and the first single, "Killing Me Inside", was released along with a music video. The release date for We All Bleed was originally October 26, 2010, but was pushed back first to January 2011, then April 12, 2011, before being pushed back a third time to June 21, 2011. The album closer track "Make Me A Believer" was made available for download for free in the meantime, which is the longest song the band has ever recorded. Around that time after the album was finished recording, studio drummer Will Hunt became the drummer of American rock band, Evanescence, with whom he toured in 2007.

In November 2010, Crossfade announced on their YouTube channel, CrossfadeMusicTV, that Mark Castillo from the metalcore band Bury Your Dead would be the band's new drummer.

The same day that the first single "Killing Me Inside" was officially released to digital retailers, the band announced on their Twitter that the album would finally be released on June 21, 2011. In November, the band also released the second single, "Prove You Wrong", and released the music video for the song in December.

In 2011, Crossfade headlined Rockapalooza in Jackson, Michigan.

Crossfade supported Papa Roach and Buckcherry on the Rock Allegiance Tour in 2011 with Puddle of Mudd, P.O.D., Red, and Drive A.

In January 2012, drummer Mark Castillo announced on his Facebook that he had left Crossfade to pursue a career in the metalcore band Emmure.

Despite a lengthy period of inactivity, the band had not broken up as of August 2016. Sloan took to Facebook to address rumors of the band's demise in the meantime.

In 2024, Crossfade announced their first two shows since 2011 will be at Sonic Temple and Inkcarceration 2025.

== Band members ==
Current members

- Ed Sloan – lead vocals, rhythm guitar (1991–2012, 2024–present)
- Mitch James – bass, backing vocals (1991–2012, 2024–present)
- Les Hall – lead guitar, keyboards, sampler, backing vocals (2006–2012, 2024–present)

Current touring musicians

- Ryan Bennett – drums (2024–present)

Former members

- Brian Geiger – drums (1992–2004)
- Tony Byroads – turntables, sampler, lead and backing vocals (1996–2005)
- James Branham – drums (2004–2008)
- Mark Castillo – drums (2010–2012)

Former touring musicians

- Will Hunt – drums (2008–2010)

Timeline

== Discography ==
Crossfade discography
- Studio albums: 3
- Singles: 10
- Music videos: 7

=== Studio albums ===
Title	Album details	Peak chart positions					Certifications
Title	Album details	US	US Alt.	US Heat.	US Ind.	US Rock	Certifications
Crossfade	Released: April 13, 2004; Label: Columbia	41	—	1	—	—	RIAA: Platinum
Falling Away	Released: August 29, 2006; Label: Columbia	30	—	—	—	9	
We All Bleed	Released: June 21, 2011; Label: Eleven Seven	100	14	—	17	26	
"—" denotes a release that did not chart.

=== Singles ===
Year	Song	Peak chart positions					Certifications	Album
Year	Song	US	US Alt.	US Main.	US Pop	SWE	Certifications	Album
2004	"Cold"	81	2	3	23	47	RIAA: Gold	Crossfade
2005	"So Far Away"	—	14	4	—	—		Crossfade
2005	"Colors"	—	18	6	—	—		Crossfade
2006	"Invincible"	—	—	18	—	—		Falling Away
2006	"Drown You Out"	—	—	21	—	—		Falling Away
2006	"Already Gone"	—	—	—	—	—		Falling Away
2011	"Killing Me Inside"	—	—	17	—	—		We All Bleed
2011	"Prove You Wrong"	—	—	32	—	—		We All Bleed
2012	"Dear Cocaine"	—	—	—	—	—		We All Bleed
2012	"We All Bleed"	—	—	—	—	—		We All Bleed
"—" denotes a release that did not chart.

=== Music videos ===
Title	Year	Ref
Cold	2004	
Colors	2005	
Invincible	2006	
Drown You Out	2006	
Killing Me Inside	2011	
Prove You Wrong	2011	
Dear Cocaine	2012	
