= We All Bleed =

Studio album by Crossfade
- Released: June 21, 2011
- Recorded: 2008–2011
- Genres: Post-grunge; alternative metal
- Length: 48:42
- Label: Eleven Seven
- Producers: Les Hall; Ed Sloan

Crossfade chronology
| Falling Away (2006) | We All Bleed (2011) |

Singles from We All Bleed
- 1. "Killing Me Inside" Released: April 5, 2011; 2. "Prove You Wrong" Released: November 12, 2011; 3. "Dear Cocaine" Released: April 10, 2012; 4. "We All Bleed" Released: December 8, 2012

Professional ratings
Review scores
| Source | Rating |
|---|---|
| AllMusic | 3/5 stars |
| Dutch Distortion | 8.5/10 stars |
| Sputnikmusic | 3.5/5 stars |

We All Bleed is the third album by American rock band Crossfade. It was released on June 21, 2011 – the band's first album in five years as well as their first album since signing with Eleven Seven Music.

== Background ==
In 2008, after being dropped from Columbia Records, lead singer Ed Sloan admitted that he fell into a depression of sorts and began to feel disillusioned with the music industry. He admits "Coming from the success of the first record and losing our way after the second album hit me hard. You get signed, everything is golden and you think it'll go on forever. After we were dropped, I was consumed with self-doubt. Music had always been my escape, but then music became my enemy. I shut down as a songwriter—and actually, pretty much as a human being".

Lead guitarist and keyboardist Les Hall is credited with rejuvenating Sloan's musical interest and masterminding the recording of We All Bleed. Ed Sloan says that his exile had taken him to a darker place in life and that the songs in We All Bleed would reflect that. Though dealing with harsh realities the band also stated that there is a strong element of positivity in the album that 'gets you ready to face the day'. Sloan and Hall maintain that cutting the ties associated with a major label also helped to charter that new path. "It was a fresh start. We spent two years writing whatever we wanted, with no expectations, no deadline", Sloan says. "Who knew if we would even release another record? It was a blast to have no obligation to copy the past".

== Critical reception ==
We All Bleed has received a significantly better critical response compared to Crossfade's first two albums. William Rulhmann from AllMusic gave the album an average 3 out of 5 stars saying "Five years after the disappointing sophomore album Falling Away, Crossfade return on We All Bleed as a somewhat reconstituted outfit". The album received a review from Sputnikmusic that scored the album a three and a half out of five. The review said "It is not the album that will revitalize modern radio rock, and chances are Crossfade isn't even the band that will eventually accomplish that deed; but it is a positive step for the entire genre, and it also has the potential to revive the musical careers of Crossfade's members. We All Bleed is truly a brand of radio rock that you won't feel guilty for sinking your teeth into".

== Track listing ==
All tracks are written by Les Hall, with additional co-writers as noted.

| No. | Title | Writer(s) | Length |
|---|---|---|---|
| 1. | "Dead Memories" | Ed Sloan | 2:54 |
| 2. | "Killing Me Inside" | | 5:13 |
| 3. | "Prove You Wrong" | Mitch James; Sloan | 3:18 |
| 4. | "Lay Me Down" | Sloan | 4:25 |
| 5. | "Dear Cocaine" | James; Sloan | 4:58 |
| 6. | "Suffocate" | | 5:54 |
| 7. | "I Think You Should Know" | | 3:53 |
| 8. | "We All Bleed" | | 4:04 |
| 9. | "Open Up Your Eyes" | Sloan | 3:56 |
| 10. | "Make Me a Believer" | Jay Clifford; Sloan | 10:11 |
| Total length: | | | 48:42 |

iTunes deluxe edition bonus track
| No. | Title | Length |
|---|---|---|
| 11. | "Killing Me Inside" (music video) | 3:42 |
| Total length: | | 51:24 |

== Personnel ==
Crossfade

- Ed Sloan – lead vocals, rhythm guitar, co-producer, engineer, arrangements
- Les Hall – lead guitar, keyboards, background vocals, producer, engineer, arrangements, programming, sampling, string arrangements (tracks 2, 6, 8)
- Mitch James – bass, background vocals, arrangements
- Mark Castillo – drums

Additional personnel

- Ben Grosse – mixing
- Ted Jensen – mastering
- Will Hunt – drums
- Travis "Tronik" Huff – drum and additional piano engineer
- Mimi "Audia" Parker – assistant drum and piano engineer
- Rick Beato – additional guitar and bass engineer
- Ken Lanyon – additional guitar and bass engineer
- Kii Arens – artwork and photography
- Paul Pavao – mix assistant, editing, and additional engineering (track 10)
- Mikey Canzonetta – mix assistant, editing, and additional engineering (track 10)
- Dan Rockett – additional engineering (track 2)
- José Alcantar – additional editing
- Jay Clifford – string arrangements (tracks 2, 6–8, 10)
- Brian Conner – additional background vocals (track 4)
- Eddie Horst – string conductor (tracks 2, 6–8, 10)
- Justin Bruns – violin 1 (tracks 2, 6–8, 10)
- Kenn Wagner – violin 2 (tracks 2, 6–8, 10)
- Catherine Lynn – viola (tracks 2, 6–8, 10)
- Daniel Lavfer – cello (tracks 2, 6–8, 10)
- Chuck Wiggins – guitar tech

== Chart performance ==
| Chart (2011) | Peak position |
|---|---|
| US Billboard 200 | 100 |
| US Billboard Alternative Albums | 14 |
| US Billboard Independent Albums | 17 |
| US Billboard Rock Albums | 26 |
| US Billboard Hard Rock Albums | 9 |

== Singles ==
On June 1, 2010, the music video for the first single "Killing Me Inside" was released. The single was released to iTunes and Amazon.com on April 5, 2011. It peaked at No. 16 on the Active Rock chart and at No. 17 on the Mainstream Rock chart. "Prove You Wrong" was released as the second single, while "Dear Cocaine" was released as the third single. "We All Bleed" was released as a fourth and final single. Music videos were created for all three singles.
