= Magazine (Jump, Little Children album) =

Studio album by Jump, Little Children
- Released: September 1, 1998
- Genre: Alternative rock, indie rock, baroque pop, blues rock, experimental rock
- Length: 41:17
- Label: Breaking/Atlantic
- Producer: Brad Jones

Jump, Little Children chronology
Buzz (1997)	Magazine (1998)	The Early Years, Volume 1 (2001)

Professional ratings
Review scores
Source	Rating
AllMusic	2/5 stars

Magazine is an album by the American indie rock group Jump, Little Children, released in 1998. It was the band's major label debut.

== Critical reception ==
The Boston Herald thought that "from the three minute, three-chord sugar rush of 'My Guitar', to the cello-buoyed mope-rock of 'Cathedrals', Jump, Little Children comes off like pop-wise old pros."

AllMusic wrote that "there's an accent on swelling, instantly gracious choruses, but the band seems a bit too tentative in their new direction to infuse the songs with the self-belief necessary for the music to rise above American indie convention."

== Track listing ==
All songs written by Jay Clifford, except where noted.

1. "Not Today" – 3:26
2. "Violent Dreams" – 4:02
3. "Come Out Clean" – 2:54
4. "Cathedrals" – 3:55
5. "All Those Days Are Gone" – 3:40
6. "Body Parts" (Matthew Bivins) – 3:44
7. "My Guitar" – 3:35
8. "B-13" (Evan Bivins) – 3:49
9. "Habit" (Matthew Bivins) – 4:52
10. "Say Goodnight" – 4:31
11. "Close Your Eyes" – 2:49

== Personnel ==
- Jump, Little Children
  - Evan Bivins – Drums, Guitar, Hammer Dulcimer, Percussion, Vocals
  - Matthew Bivins – Accordion, Composer, Electronic Mandolin, Guitar, Harmonica, Mandolin, Moog Bass, Vocals
  - Jonathan Gray – Bass, Vocals
  - Jay Clifford – Composer, Guitar, Guitar (Acoustic), Mellotron, Organ, Piano, String Arrangements, Toy Piano, Vocals
  - Ward Williams – Cello, Group Member, Guitar, Programming, Vocals
- Brad Jones – Engineer, Mixing, Producer
- Amanda Kapousouz – Musician
- Jason Lehning – Assistant Engineer
- Matt Martone – Engineer
- Frank Ockenfels – Photography
- Dee Dee Ramone – count-in vocals to "Come Out Clean"
- Jim Rondinelli – Mixing
- Lamar Sorrento – Cover Art
- Leon Zervos – Mastering

== Charts ==
Chart (1998)	Peak position
US Billboard Heatseekers	29
