= She Says (Howie Day song) =

Single by Howie Day

from the album Australia and Stop All the World Now
- Released: January 26, 2004
- Recorded: 2003
- Studio: Olympic Studios (London, UK)
- Genre: Acoustic pop; pop rock
- Length: 4:15
- Label: Sony; Epic
- Songwriter(s): Howie Day
- Producer(s): Youth (album version): Mike Flynn; Warren Huart; (radio version)

Howie Day singles chronology
"Perfect Time of Day" (2003)	"She Says" (2004)	"Collide" (2004)

Music video
- "She Says" on YouTube

"She Says" is a song written and performed by American singer-songwriter Howie Day. It was initially recorded for his debut studio album Australia (2000), which was re-issued in 2002. It was initially produced by Day and Mike Denneen. The track was then re-recorded for his second studio album and major label debut album Stop All the World Now (2003). The album version of "She Says" featured on Stop All the World Now was produced by Youth. "She Says" was initially released as the second single from Stop All the World Now on January 26, 2004, to adult album alternative radio. It was later re-released over a year later to pop and adult contemporary radio in a radio version produced by Mike Flynn and Warren Huart.

== Background ==
"She Says" was featured on a Dawson's Creek compilation entitled "Joey's Favorites", released on January 7, 2003.

== Critical reception ==
The version of "She Says" featured on Australia received favorable reviews from music critics. Louis Miller of CMJ New Music Report called the track "lonesome sounding". Sergio Burstein of the Spanish magazine La Opinión had this to say, writing "Mas alla de la presencia de cortes acusticos como "She Says" y "Kristina" (donde la voz sigue con esmero las inflexiones de Bono), Australia es una produccion con un sonido medianamente rockero, en la linea melodica pero melancolica de artistas como Richard Ashcroft y Jeff Buckley (escuchen "Sorry So Sorry" y "She Says")." In his review of the version of "She Says" featured on Stop All the World Now, Johnny Loftus said that the re-recorded version "now has the full grandeur of U2's most plaintive moments."

== Chart performance ==
Unlike "Collide", "She Says" failed to enter the US Billboard Hot 100 but did reach number 73 on the Pop 100 the week of December 3, 2005. It also peaked at number three on the Bubbling Under Hot 100, which represents the 25 most popular songs that have yet to enter the main Hot 100. "She Says" is also Day's highest-charting single on the Adult Pop Airplay chart, peaking at number 6 on December 24, 2005.

== Music video ==
The accompanying music video for "She Says" was directed by Darren Grant. It was officially released to MTV on October 10, 2005.

== Charts ==
=== Weekly charts ===
Weekly chart performance for "She Says"
Chart (2004–2006)	Peak position
Canada (Nielsen SoundScan)	19
Canada Hot AC Top 30 (Radio & Records)	21
US Bubbling Under Hot 100 (Billboard)	3
US Adult Contemporary (Billboard)	31
US Adult Pop Airplay (Billboard)	6
US Pop Airplay (Billboard)	39
US Pop 100 (Billboard)	73
US CHR/Pop (Radio & Records)	36
US Hot AC (Radio & Records)	6
US Triple-A (Radio & Records)	22

=== Year-end charts ===
2005 year-end chart performance for "She Says"
Chart (2005)	Position
US Adult Top 40 (Billboard)	63
US Hot AC (Radio & Records)	62

2006 year-end chart performance for "She Says"
Chart (2006)	Position
US Adult Top 40 (Billboard)	28
US Hot AC (Radio & Records)	28

== Release history ==
Release dates and formats for "She Says"
Region	Date	Format(s)	Label(s)	Ref.
United States	January 26, 2004	Triple-A radio	Epic	
United States	February 2, 2004	Hot adult contemporary radio	Epic	
United States	July 25, 2005 (re-release)	Hot adult contemporary radio	Epic	
United States	August 22, 2005 (re-release)	Triple-A radio	Epic	
United States	August 29, 2005	Contemporary hit radio	Epic	
