= They Call Me Mr. Melody =

Studio album by Singing Melody
- Released: January 17, 2012
- Genre: Reggae
- Length: 48:58
- Label: S.H.E.M. MUSIC/FAT EYES/VPAL

They Call Me Mr. Melody is a studio album by a Jamaican reggae singer Singing Melody. The album was released on January 17, 2012 through S.H.E.M. MUSIC/FAT EYES/VPAL.

== Production ==
The album is Singing Melody's seventh, taking him two years to complete.

Producers of this album include Grammy Award winners Dave Kelly, as well as Donovan Germaine of Penthouse Records and Lynford 'Fatta' Marshall.

== Reception ==
The lead single, "Collide", became #1 on 4 international Reggae charts. The album also reached #6 on the Billboard Reggae Chart.

== Track listing ==
No.	Title	Length
1.	"No More (Ta-Da)"	4:12
2.	"Collide"	3:40
3.	"Must Be The Girl" (featuring Stacious)	3:23
4.	"Don’t Cry"	3:55
5.	"Time Wasted"	4:00
6.	"Smile" (featuring U Roy)	3:51
7.	"Cry Me a River" (featuring L.U.S.T)	3:28
8.	"Never Get Over You"	3:45
9.	"Reggae to the Bone" (featuring Lymie Murray)	3:58
10.	"Wi Set Di Trend"	3:28
11.	"Leaders of the World"	3:49
12.	"Call It The Blues"	3:46
13.	"Call On His Name"	3:43
14.	"Original Gangster"	3:57
Total length:		48:58
