= Kevin Griffin =

American musician (born 1968)

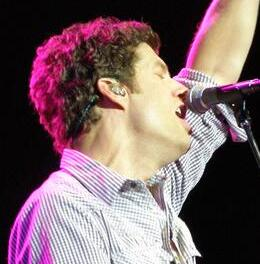
- Griffin performing with Better Than Ezra in 2010

Background information
- Born: Kevin Michael Griffin; October 1, 1968 (age 58); Atlanta, Georgia, U.S.
- Genres: Rock; alternative rock; country
- Occupations: Singer; songwriter; record producer
- Instruments: Vocals; guitar; piano
- Years active: 1988–present
- Member of: Better Than Ezra

Kevin Michael Griffin (born October 1, 1968) is an American singer, songwriter, and record producer. He is best known as the lead vocalist of the rock band Better Than Ezra, with whom he has released nine studio albums. He has also issued one solo record.

His songs have been performed and recorded by artists such as Taylor Swift, Train, James Blunt, Christina Perri, Howie Day, Barenaked Ladies, Blondie, and Missy Higgins, among others. He is a co-founder and partner of the Pilgrimage Music & Cultural Festival in Franklin, Tennessee.

== Early life and education ==
Griffin was born in Atlanta, Georgia, and grew up in Monroe, Louisiana. He attended River Oaks School, where he met future bandmate Jim Payne. He received a bachelor's degree in English and a minor in political science from Louisiana State University in 1990. He was a member of the Kappa Sigma fraternity. He took the LSAT with the intention of attending law school and working in entertainment law. He then took a job with Creative Artists Agency in Los Angeles in the early 1990s.

== Music career ==
=== Better Than Ezra ===
Griffin formed the alternative rock band Better Than Ezra in 1988. It reached the top of the Modern Rock Tracks chart with the 1995 single "Good", which stayed atop that chart for seven weeks. "Good" also reached No. 3 on the Billboard Mainstream Rock Tracks chart and No. 30 on the Billboard Hot 100.

The band enjoyed further success with hits such as "In the Blood", "Rosealia", "King of New Orleans", "Desperately Wanting", "One More Murder", and "At the Stars".

In 2010, the Better Than Ezra song "Breathless" was covered by Taylor Swift at the Hope for Haiti Now telethon, the most widely distributed telethon in history.

=== Solo career and Ezra Ray Hart ===
Griffin's first solo album, Anywhere You Go, was released on October 4, 2019. Griffin also performs as part of the supergroup Ezra Ray Hart, with Mark McGrath of Sugar Ray and Emerson Hart of Tonic.

As a performer, Griffin is known for singing in falsetto, inviting audience members onstage to play guitar, and interrupting his own songs with verses of well-known rock songs. He is also a mimic, imitating singers such as Aaron Neville, Bruce Springsteen, and Dave Matthews.

Griffin has won numerous BMI pop and country awards.

=== Songwriting ===
Griffin has produced, written, and co-written platinum albums and songs that have sold more than thirty million copies in total. His number-one hits include Howie Day's "Collide" (2004) and Sugarland's "Stuck Like Glue" (2010).

Songs written by Griffin have been performed and recorded by artists such as Taylor Swift, Train, James Blunt, Moon Taxi, Christina Perri, Trombone Shorty, Barenaked Ladies, Tom Morello, Boys Like Girls, Blondie, Chase Rice, the Struts, and Missy Higgins, among others.

== Other endeavors ==
Griffin is a co-founder and partner of the Pilgrimage Music & Cultural Festival in Franklin, Tennessee. Rolling Stone's 2015 review of the festival's inaugural year was positive, saying it had "an A-list lineup (arguably the best curated of the year)" and "established itself as a festival to watch". Performers have included Justin Timberlake, Foo Fighters, Willie Nelson, Chris Stapleton, the Killers, Dave Matthews Band, Maren Morris, the Black Keys, Cage the Elephant, and Black Pumas.

In 2018, Griffin was an adjunct professor at NYU's Clive Davis Institute of Recorded Music.

Griffin is active with MusiCares and St. Jude Children's Research Hospital. In 2020, through a series of livestreamed acoustic performances, he was able to raise more than $220K for various charities helping those adversely affected by the COVID-19 pandemic.

== Personal life ==
Griffin and his family largely resided in the Uptown neighborhood of New Orleans until Hurricane Katrina devastated the city in 2005. He purchased a home in the Silver Lake neighborhood of Los Angeles in July 2006, and in 2011, he sold it and moved to Franklin, Tennessee, with his family.

Griffin's first marriage ended in divorce, and "substance abuse was a factor". He has three children.

He married Erica Krusen, a senior executive with Gibson Guitar Brands, in 2022.

In a June 2025 interview, Griffin stated that he had been sober for ten years.

== Selected songwriting credits ==
Year	Artist	Song	Album	Credit
2003	Blondie	"Good Boys"	The Curse of Blondie	Co-writer
2003	Howie Day	"Collide"	Stop All the World Now	Co-writer
2003	Howie Day	"Perfect Time of Day"	Stop All the World Now	Co-writer
2003	Howie Day	"Sunday Morning Song"	Stop All the World Now	Co-writer
2003	Meat Loaf	"Testify"	Couldn't Have Said It Better	Writer
2004	Missy Higgins	"Don't Ever"	The Sound of White	Co-writer
2004	Missy Higgins	"Scar"	The Sound of White	Co-writer
2004	Missy Higgins	"Unbroken"	The Sound of White	Co-writer
2005	Josh Kelley	"Lover Come Up"	Almost Honest	Co-writer
2007	Jon McLaughlin	"Human"	Indiana	Co-writer
2008	David Cook	"Avalanche"	David Cook	Co-writer
2008	Lenka	"Knock Knock"	Lenka	Co-writer
2008	Tristan Prettyman	"Madly"	Hello...x	Co-writer
2009	Howie Day	"Be There"	Sound the Alarm	Co-writer
2009	Howie Day	"Longest Night"	Sound the Alarm	Co-writer
2009	Howie Day	"Sound the Alarm"	Sound the Alarm	Co-writer
2009	Howie Day	"Undressed"	Sound the Alarm	Co-writer
2009	Train	"I Got You"	Save Me, San Francisco	Co-writer
2010	Taylor Swift	"Breathless"	Hope for Haiti Now	Writer
2010	James Blunt	"I'll Be Your Man"	Some Kind of Trouble	Co-writer
2010	Sugarland	"Stuck Like Glue"	The Incredible Machine	Co-writer
2010	Sugarland	"Tonight"	The Incredible Machine	Co-writer
2011	Augustana	"Counting Stars"	Augustana	Co-writer
2011	David Cook	"Fade into Me"	This Loud Morning	Co-writer
2011	Il Volo	"This Time"	Il Volo (international version)	Co-writer
2012	Boys Like Girls	"Crazy World"	Crazy World	Co-writer
2012	Missy Higgins	"Hello Hello"	The Ol' Razzle Dazzle	Co-writer
2013	Barenaked Ladies	"Did I Say That Out Loud?"	Grinning Streak	Co-writer
2013	Barenaked Ladies	"Gonna Walk"	Grinning Streak	Co-writer
2013	Barenaked Ladies	"Odds Are"	Grinning Streak	Co-writer
2013	James Blunt	"Kiss This Love Goodbye"	Moon Landing (deluxe edition)	Co-writer
2013	James Blunt	"Telephone"	Moon Landing (deluxe edition)	Co-writer
2014	Christina Perri	"Lonely Child"	Head or Heart	Co-writer
2014	Christina Perri	"One Night"	Head or Heart	Co-writer
2014	Megan and Liz	"Night of Our Lives"	Simple Life	Co-writer
2015	Barenaked Ladies	"Get Back Up"	Silverball	Co-writer
2015	Barenaked Ladies	"Duct Tape Heart"	Silverball	Co-writer
2015	David Cook	"Home Movies (Over Your Shoulder)"	Digital Vein	Co-writer
2015	Andrew McMahon	"Canyon Moon"	Andrew McMahon in the Wilderness	Co-writer
2016	Violent Femmes	"Issues"	We Can Do Anything	Co-writer
2017	Barenaked Ladies	"Canada Dry"	Fake Nudes	Co-writer
2017	Barenaked Ladies	"Bringing It Home"	Fake Nudes	Co-writer
2017	Barenaked Ladies	"Lookin' Up"	Fake Nudes	Co-writer
2017	Barenaked Ladies	"You + Me vs. the World"	Fake Nudes	Co-writer
2017	Trombone Shorty	"Where It At?"	Parking Lot Symphony	Co-writer
2018	The Struts	"Freak Like You"	Young & Dangerous	Co-writer
2018	Mike Love	"Must Be Christmas"	Reason for the Season	Co-writer
2018	Moon Taxi	"Good as Gold"	Let the Record Play	Co-writer
2021	Barenaked Ladies	"Flip"	Detour de Force	Co-writer
2021	Barenaked Ladies	"Good Life"	Detour de Force	Co-writer
2021	Barenaked Ladies	"New Disaster"	Detour de Force	Co-writer
2021	Barenaked Ladies	"Roll Out"	Detour de Force	Co-writer
2021	Tom Morello	"Raising Hell"	The Atlas Underground Flood	Co-writer
2021	Chase Rice	"American Nights"	The Album	Co-writer
