= Cold (Crossfade song) =

2004 single by Crossfade

Single by Crossfade

from the album Crossfade
- Released: January 26, 2004
- Genre: Post-grunge
- Length: 3:17
- Label: Columbia
- Songwriter: Ed Sloan
- Producer: Crossfade

Crossfade singles chronology
"Cold" (2004)	"So Far Away" (2005)

"Cold" is a song by the American rock band Crossfade. Released as their debut single on January 26, 2004, it served as the lead single from their 2004 debut self-titled album. "Cold" reached number 81 on the US Billboard Hot 100, number three on the Billboard Mainstream Rock Tracks chart, and number two on the Billboard Modern Rock Tracks. Worldwide, the song charted in Sweden, reaching number 47 on the Hitlistan chart in May 2005. The single was certified gold by the Recording Industry Association of America (RIAA).

== Music video ==
The video for "Cold" was directed by Martin Weisz. It features Crossfade playing in a dark room of a house. A woman (Beau Garrett) walks in the house, standing and admiring the band performing for a while. She then walks up to Ed Sloan, but he continues to play and ignores her. She proceeds to pack some items into a bag and walks back to where the band is playing, towards Sloan.

The woman stands there for a while, then she goes back into the bathroom, with Sloan right behind her. She picks up a picture of the two of them and throws it into the toilet, symbolizing the end of the relationship. She takes a toothbrush and then walks through Sloan, who becomes transparent—making a reference to how he was never really there for her. She goes out of the bathroom, to the door, and stops to look back at the band playing. Sloan looks at her, then looks away. She then leaves the house, presumably for good.

== Charts ==
=== Weekly charts ===
Weekly chart performance for "Cold"
Chart (2004–2005)	Peak position
Sweden (Sverigetopplistan)	47
US Billboard Hot 100	81
US Mainstream Rock Tracks (Billboard)	3
US Mainstream Top 40 (Billboard)	23
US Modern Rock Tracks (Billboard)	2
US Active Rock Top 50 (Radio & Records)	1

=== Year-end charts ===
2004 year-end chart performance for "Cold"
Chart (2004)	Position
US Mainstream Rock Tracks (Billboard)	5
US Modern Rock Tracks (Billboard)	40

2005 year-end chart performance for "Cold"
Chart (2005)	Position
US Mainstream Rock Tracks (Billboard)	40
US Mainstream Top 40 (Billboard)	60
US Modern Rock Tracks (Billboard)	12

== Certifications ==
Certifications and sales for "Cold"
Region	Certification	Certified units/sales
New Zealand (RMNZ)	Gold	15,000^{‡}
United States (RIAA) Digital	Gold	500,000^{^}
United States (RIAA) Mastertone	Gold	500,000^{^}
^{^} Shipments figures based on certification alone.^{‡} Sales+streaming figures based on certification alone.

== Release history ==
Release dates and formats for "Cold"
Region	Date	Format(s)	Label(s)	Ref.
United States	January 26, 2004	Mainstream rock; active rock radio	Columbia	
United States	March 29, 2004	Alternative radio	Columbia	
United States	August 23, 2004	Contemporary hit radio	Columbia	
