= Les Hall =

- Origin: Columbia, South Carolina, United States
- Occupation: Musician
- Instruments: Vocals; guitar; bass guitar; keyboards; drums
- Years active: 1999–present
- Website: 537studios.com

Les Hall is an American composer, producer, multi-instrumentalist, and songwriter from Columbia, South Carolina, best known for his involvement in Crossfade and 70 Volt Parade, Trey Anastasio's backup band after the 2004–2009 breakup of Phish. He has also toured worldwide with Howie Day and has been a member of numerous bands local to Columbia, including Jebel, Sourwood Honey, the Robert Newton Group, and Sterling.

In addition to working as a session and touring musician, he composed the score for the Hungarian documentary Freedom's Fury, about the country's Olympic water polo team during the Revolution of 1956, which was narrated by Mark Spitz and executive produced by Quentin Tarantino and Lucy Liu. The film made its debut at the Tribeca Festival in 2006 and was a selected feature at Cannes the same year. He has also composed scores for National Geographic, several short films, and played piano/additional string arrangements on Rob Zombie's House of 1000 Corpses.

Hall composed the score for East of the Mountains, released in 2021.

== Discography ==
- Howie Day
- Stop All the World Now (2003)
- Sound the Alarm (2009)
- We All Bleed (2011)
