= Jump, Little Children =

American rock band

- Left to right: Jay Clifford, Ward Williams, Evan Bivins, Jonathan Gray, Matthew Bivins.

Background information
- Origin: Winston-Salem, North Carolina; Charleston, South Carolina
- Genres: Indie rock Baroque pop
- Years active: 1991–2005, 2015–2022
- Labels: Breaking Records/ Atlantic Records; EZ Chief Records; Brash Music
- Website: jumplittlechildren.com

Jump, Little Children was an American indie rock band that formed in 1991 in Winston-Salem, North Carolina, United States. Known for its unique sound, energetic live performances, and willingness to interact with fans, the band has a devoted following and is a fixture in the Charleston, South Carolina music scene. The name "Jump, Little Children" is taken from a song written by blues musician Leroy Dallas and covered by Sonny Terry and Brownie McGhee.

== History ==
=== 1991–1994: Formation ===
Jay Clifford, Matthew Bivins, Ward Williams, and Christopher Pollen met and formed Jump, Little Children at the North Carolina School of the Arts in Winston-Salem, North Carolina in 1991. The band played its first show on January 1, 1992 as part of a New Year's Day festival in downtown Winston-Salem.

The group was performing Irish music, and Clifford, Bivins, and Pollen traveled to Ireland to learn their craft firsthand during the winter of 1992. Upon their return, Evan Bivins left the School of the Arts to join the band, and the quartet decided to move to Boston, Massachusetts. As they worked to finance the move, the band spent the summer of 1993 in Charleston, S.C., where they met future member Jonathan Gray. After arriving in Boston in late 1993, Jump, Little Children recorded and released a self-titled cassette featuring original songs and traditional Irish works. Pollen then left the group to join a religious community, and Clifford and the Bivins brothers returned to Charleston in the summer of 1994.

=== 1995–1999: The Licorice Tea Demos, Buzz, and Magazine ===
Gray and Williams joined the lineup soon thereafter and the band was frequently found busking on the corner of Church and Market Streets in Charleston. Their Irish influences began to blend with an alternative rock sound, and the public took notice. Jump, Little Children recorded and released The Licorice Tea Demos in early 1995 and toured the Southeast with vigor. They continued to gain local notoriety and received regional radio airplay for the song "Quiet." Regular touring continued throughout 1996 and 1997, including the first of what would become a yearly tradition: New Year's shows at the Dock Street Theatre in Charleston.

Buzz, a live EP, was released in early 1997, and the band was courted by various record labels. The group eventually chose Breaking Records (a subsidiary of Atlantic Records started by Hootie and the Blowfish) in 1998. Jump, Little Children's only album released under Breaking Records, Magazine, was recorded during the summer of 1998 with producer Brad Jones. Magazine was released in the fall of 1998, and the single "Cathedrals" achieved radio play nationwide over the following year.

=== 2000–2005: Vertigo and Between The Dim & The Dark ===
Looking to build on the success of "Cathedrals," the band reentered the studio in the fall of 2000 to record Vertigo. Produced by Clifford and Brad Wood and mixed by David Leonard, the album was originally due to be released in May 2001, but was put on hold when Breaking Records was dropped from the Atlantic roster. The rights to Vertigo were given to Breaking, and after a fierce struggle, Jump, Little Children was able to release the album on their own imprint, EZ Chief Records, in September 2001. Vertigo reached No. 44 on the Billboard Top Independent Albums chart.

The band regrouped over 2002 and 2003, expanding their touring to include the Midwest and West Coast and recording and releasing a DVD titled Live At The Music Farm. They also expanded EZ Chief Records, launching a website where users could create custom CDs using tracks from independent artists. In the summer of 2003, the band took its first hiatus, but soon returned with an abbreviated name, "Jump," and plans for another album, Between The Dim & The Dark. Produced by Rick Beato and released on Brash Music in April 2004, the album was well received. Between The Glow & The Light, an EP of B-sides to Between The Dim & The Dark, was released in April 2005.

On June 16, 2005, the band announced that the tenth annual Dock Street Theatre shows at end of 2005 would mark their split. The final show was a black tie affair in Charleston on December 30, 2005, and featured material from each of the member's future projects. The show ended with the band and audience walking from the theatre to the corner of Church and Market Streets for a busking session typical of the band's early years. "Jump, Little Children" was the last song played. During the final show, Amanda Kapousouz announced the formation of a scholarship fund at the College of Charleston in honor of the band.

=== 2006–2015: Hiatus ===
Live at the Dock Street Theatre, a double live album, was released in 2006 and would be the band's last recording for more than ten years. Over the next decade, the bandmates spread out across the country and pursued their own artistic interests. Finally, in a May 2014 interview, Jay Clifford hinted at a reunion: "I can neither confirm, nor deny, a Jump, Little Children reunion tour in 2015."

=== 2015–2018: Reunion ===
On March 13, 2015, the band's new website announced the eleventh installment of Dock Street by displaying a countdown to December 28, 2015. A full reunion tour (the "Church and Queen Tour") was announced in May 2015 and consisted of four club dates followed by two nights of Dock Street. The demand for the six shows was overwhelming, with both nights of Dock Street selling out in less than one minute, and the band responded by adding three more club dates.

Bringing the "Jump" community back together was an emotional experience for both the band and its audiences. After such a successful reunion, discussion once again turned to the future. Matt Bivins wrote, "Nothing is set right now. We know that we don’t want to be in a rock band again, full-time. We want anything we work on together to be special. We don’t want to forget again why we started this band in the first place: because we were friends that loved working together, creating music together, having fun."

On November 10, 2016, Jump, Little Children announced that it would participate in the High Water Festival organized by Shovels & Rope. In addition, the band announced another short Southeastern tour scheduled for April 2017.

=== 2018–2022: Sparrow and Foundering ===
In January 2018, the band announced they would be releasing their first full-length album in more than 13 years. The new album, titled Sparrow, was released on Friday, September 14, 2018. The first single off Sparrow, "Hand on My Heartache", was released as a lyric video via the website of music magazine American Songwriter on August 16, 2018.

On October 5, 2021, Matt and Evan Bivins announced that they would be leaving the band to focus on building a company together, while the remaining three members would continue to perform under the name Jump, Little Children. The band's sixth studio album, Foundering, was recorded in Nashville, Tennessee in March 2022 and released on September 23, 2022. Prior to the release, the band announced that the album and accompanying tour would both be the last. A 15-date "Farewell Tour" spanned the Southeast and featured Christina Cone on vocals and keyboard and Josh Kaler on drums. The tour concluded with back-to-back shows in Charleston, SC, with the band's final show at the Charleston Music Hall on December 30, 2022.

== Members ==
Core Members

- Evan Bivins (1993–2021): drums
- Matthew Bivins (1991–2021): vocals, accordion, harmonica, mandolin, melodica, and tin whistle
- Jay Clifford (1991–2022): vocals and rhythm guitar
- Jonathan Gray (1994–2022): double bass
- Ward Williams (1991–2022): cello and guitar

Past Members

- Christopher Pollen: guitar
- Tim Connell: tin whistle, mandolin, and electric bass

Collaborators

- Christina Cone (of Frances Cone): vocals and keyboard
- Josh Kaler (of Hula Hi-Fi and Slow Runner): drums and pedal steel
- Michael Bellar (of The As-Is Ensemble): piano
- Amanda Kapousouz (of Tin Cup Prophette): violin

== Television and film ==
On May 5, 1999, the song "B-13" was featured in the Party of Five episode No. 116, "I'll Show You Mine." On May 19, 2003, the song "Cathedrals" was featured in Everwood episode No. 23, "Home." On December 6, 2007, the song "B-13" was featured during the narrative wrap of Scrubs episode No. 706, "My Number One Doctor." The song "Cathedrals" was also featured in an episode of the Netflix TV show The Society. "Cathedrals" is the ending song of the film "Modi - Three Days on the Wings of Madness" directed by Johnny Depp.

On June 22, 2011, the song "Cathedrals" was used on So You Think You Can Dance (season 8, episode No. 7). Jazz dancer Clarice Ordaz and Broadway dancer Jess LeProtto performed a contemporary routine choreographed by Stacey Tookey.

On January 18, 2014, the song "Mexico" was used in the Zach Braff film Wish I Was Here and was included in the soundtrack to the film. In addition, Jump, Little Children was one of three bands shown during True Music (HDNet) episode No. 218, "South by Southwest 2004."

== Discography ==
=== Studio albums ===
- The Licorice Tea Demos (1995) – Independent
- Magazine (September 1, 1998) – Breaking Records/Atlantic Records
- Vertigo (September 25, 2001) – EZ Chief Records
- Between the Dim & the Dark (April 20, 2004) – Brash Music
- Sparrow (September 14, 2018)
- Foundering (September 23, 2022)

=== EPs ===
- Buzz (January 25, 1997) – Independent
- Between The Glow & The Light (April 14, 2005) – EZ Chief Records

=== Compilations ===
- The Early Years, Volume 1 (June 1, 2001) – EZ Chief Records

=== Live albums ===
- Live at the Dock Street Theatre (May 2, 2006) – EZ Chief Records

=== Videos ===
- Live at the Music Farm (September 6, 2002)
