= Better than Ezra discography =

Collection of albums and songs by Better than Ezra

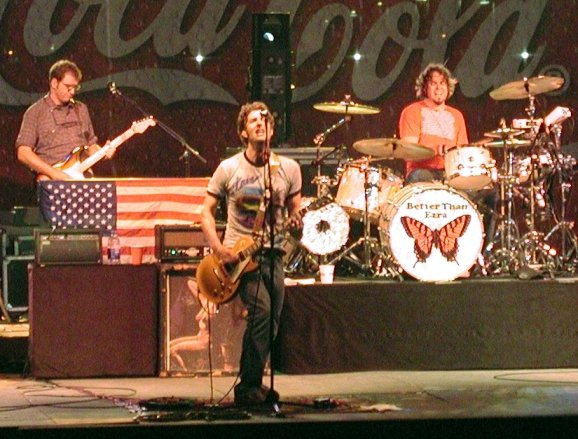
- Better than Ezra in Nashville in 2002.
- Studio albums: 9
- Extended plays: 1
- Live albums: 1
- Compilation albums: 2
- Singles: 16
- Video albums: 1
- Music videos: 11

This is a comprehensive discography of official recordings by Better than Ezra, an American alternative rock band from New Orleans, Louisiana.

== Studio albums ==
Year	Album details	Peak chart positions					Certifications (sales threshold)
Year	Album details	US	US Rock	US Indie	US Heat	AUS	Certifications (sales threshold)
1990	Surprise: Release date: April 24, 1990 (original)/August 19, 2014 (reissue); Label: Swell (original)/Liaison (reissue)	—	—	—	—	—	
1993	Deluxe: Release date: November 16, 1993; Label: Elektra	35	—	—	3	151	RIAA: Platinum; MC: Gold
1996	Friction, Baby: Release date: August 13, 1996; Label: Elektra	64	—	—	—	163	
1998	How Does Your Garden Grow?: Release date: August 25, 1998; Label: Elektra	129	—	—	—	—	
2001	Closer: Release date: August 2, 2001; Label: Beyond Music	110	—	—	—	—	
2005	Before the Robots: Release date: May 31, 2005; Label: Artemis	84	—	3	—	—	
2009	Paper Empire: Release date: May 12, 2009; Label: Megaforce	62	17	7	—	—	
2014	All Together Now: Release date: September 9, 2014; Label: The End	43	13	9	—	—	
2024	Super Magick: Release date: May 2, 2024; Label: Round Hill	—	—	—	—	—	
"—" denotes releases that did not chart

== Compilation albums ==
Year	Album details
2001	Artifakt: Release date: 2001; Label: Fudge
2005	Greatest Hits: Release date: March 15, 2005; Label: Rhino

== Live albums/DVDs ==
Year	Album details
2004	Live at the House of Blues, New Orleans: Release date: September 28, 2004; Label: Sanctuary
2011	Live at the 2011 New Orleans Jazz & Heritage Festival: Release date: 2011; Label: MunckMix
2012	Live at the 2012 New Orleans Jazz & Heritage Festival: Release date: 2012; Label: MunckMix
2013	Live at the 2013 New Orleans Jazz & Heritage Festival: Release date: 2013; Label: MunckMix
2016	Live at the 2016 New Orleans Jazz & Heritage Festival: Release date: 2016; Label: MunckMix

== Extended plays ==
Year	Album details
2011	Death Valley EP: Release date: October 18, 2011; Label: Ezra & Sons

== Singles ==
Year	Title	Peak chart positions									Album
Year	Title	US	US Mod	US Main	US Pop	US Adult	AUS	CAN	CAN Rock	UK	Album
1990	"Tremble"	—	—	—	—	—	—	—	—	—	Surprise
1995	"Good"	30	1	3	17	—	86	26	4	108	Deluxe
1995	"In the Blood"	48^{[A]}	4	6	—	—	—	66	3	—	Deluxe
1995	"Rosealia"	71	24	—	39	—	—	69	—	—	Deluxe
1996	"Rhythm of Love"	—	—	—	—	—	141	—	—	—	Deluxe
1996	"King of New Orleans"	62^{[A]}	5	7	—	—	158	—	3	—	Friction, Baby
1997	"Desperately Wanting"	48	11	10	33	37	83	—	13	—	Friction, Baby
1997	"Long Lost"	—	—	—	—	—	—	—	—	—	Friction, Baby
1997	"Normal Town"	—	—	—	—	—	—	—	—	—	Friction, Baby
1998	"One More Murder"	—	32	—	—	—	—	—	—	—	How Does Your Garden Grow?
1999	"At the Stars"	78	17	—	25	23	—	20	—	—	How Does Your Garden Grow?
1999	"Like It Like That"	—	—	—	—	—	—	—	—	—	How Does Your Garden Grow?
2001	"Extra Ordinary"	116^{[B]}	35	—	—	13	—	—	—	—	Closer
2005	"A Lifetime"	125^{[B]}	—	—	—	13	—	—	—	—	Before the Robots
2005	"Our Last Night"	—	—	—	—	28	—	—	—	—	Before the Robots
2006	"Juicy"	—	—	—	—	19	—	—	—	—	Before the Robots
2009	"Absolutely Still"	—	—	—	—	—	—	—	—	—	Paper Empire
2009	"Just One Day"	—	—	—	—	—	—	—	—	—	Paper Empire
2014	"Crazy Lucky"	—	—	—	—	38	—	—	—	—	All Together Now
2014	"Gonna Get Better"	—	—	—	—	—	—	—	—	—	All Together Now
2018	"Grateful"	—	—	—	—	—	—	—	—	—	Non-Album Single
2020	"In Your Eyes"	—	—	—	—	—	—	—	—	—	Non-Album Single
2021	“Werewolves of London”	—	—	—	—	—	—	—	—	—	Non-Album Single
"—" denotes releases that did not chart

- A Charted only on the Hot 100 Airplay chart.
- B Charted only on the Bubbling Under Hot 100 chart.

== Rare tracks ==
=== B-sides ===
- "Circle of Friends" (1995) (Empire Records soundtrack / Surprise)
- "Know You Better" (1995) ("Good" Live B-Side)
- "Eggnog Sing-A-Long” and "Merry Christmas Eve" (1996)
- "Palace Hotel" (1996) ("Desperately Wanting" B-side)
- "Road Trip to Athens" (1996) ("King of New Orleans" B-side)

=== Bonus tracks ===
- "Tom Collins" ("One More Murder" B-side / Japanese bonus track)
- "Screwed Up and Beautiful" (Closer reissue bonus track)
- "Simple Song" (Closer reissue bonus track)
- "Stall" (Live at the House of Blues New Orleans bonus track)
- "Cold Year" (Live at the House of Blues New Orleans bonus track)
- "Conjunction Junction" (Schoolhouse Rock! Rocks album)
- "In Between Moments" (Paper Empire iTunes exclusive bonus track)
- "Shut Up and Dance” (All Together Now digital download exclusive bonus track)

=== Radio, web, and streaming ===
- "False River" (played live on the air at KLSU in 1993)
- "Imperfect" (Streamed on website)
- "Cars Crash" (Website download)
- "Dirty Work" (Steely Dan cover) (Website download)
- "Revolver" (Website download)
- "Chain Smokin'"
- "I Don’t Give a Damn'"

== Music videos ==
Year	Song	Director(s)	Ref.
1995	"In the Blood"	Frank W. Ockenfels 3	
1995	"Good"	Chris Applebaum	
1995	"Rosealia" (Salma Hayek version)	Frank W. Ockenfels 3	
1995	"Rosealia" (superhero version)	Matt Mahurin	
1996	"King of New Orleans"	Lawrence Carroll	
1996	"Conjunction Junction"	Tom Yohe & Bill Peckmann	
1996	"Desperately Wanting"	Nick Egan	
2005	"A Lifetime"	David Brooks	
2006	"Juicy"	Juicy Studios	
2009	"Absolutely Still"	James Gulliver Hancock & William McMillan	
2009	"Just One Day"	Van Alan Blumreich	
