= Frank W. Ockenfels III =

American photographer and artist

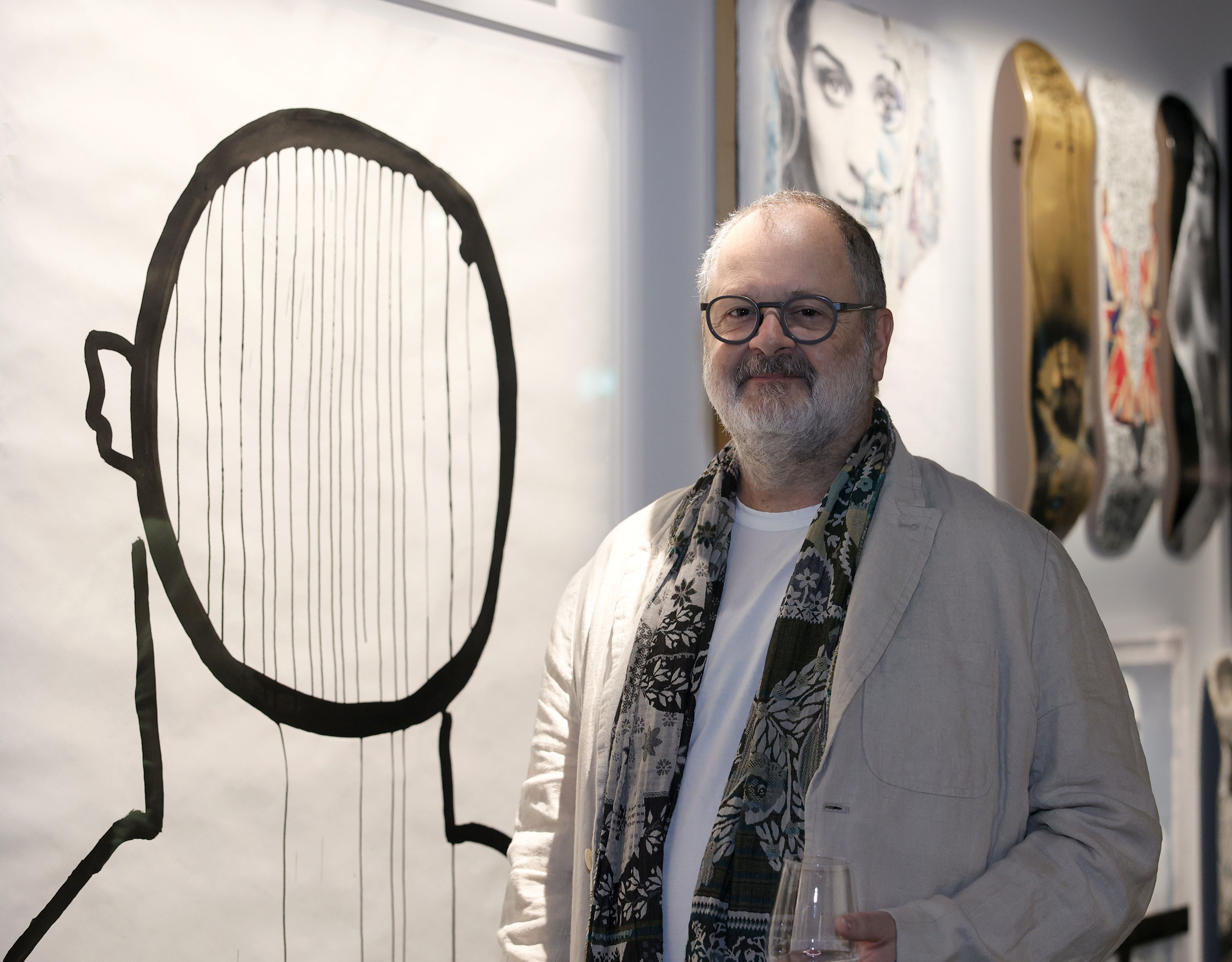
- Ockenfels III in 2024
- Born: 1960 (age 65–66); West Chester, Pennsylvania, U.S.
- Education: School of Visual Arts
- Known for: Photography
- Website: fwo3.com

Frank W. Ockenfels III (referred to professionally as Frank Ockenfels 3) is an American photographer, artist, and director known for his portraits of figures including David Bowie, Angelina Jolie, David Lynch, Alicia Keys, and Kurt Cobain. He directed music videos for artists such as Alice in Chains, Better Than Ezra, Everclear and Local H, and shot over 200 album covers for artists such as Bruce Springsteen, Sting, Waylon Jennings, Willie Nelson, Wilco, Busta Rhymes, Queen Latifah, Garbage, No Doubt, Soundgarden, and Tom Waits. Ockenfels has also done promotional photography for films and television shows such as Breaking Bad, House of Cards, Harry Potter, Pirates of the Caribbean, and Interview with the Vampire, among others.

== Early life and education ==
Ockenfels was born in West Chester, Pennsylvania but grew up in Lockport, New York, a suburb of Niagara Falls. His interest in photography began in childhood, and he often photographed classmates in junior high and high school. He was the yearbook photographer during his senior year of high school. After high school in 1978, Ockenfels applied to and studied at the School of Visual Arts in New York City.

== Career ==
After college, Ockenfels worked as an assistant for Joshua Greene, Milton Greene's son. He cites Greene and Jeff Dunas as his early inspirations and mentors. For a short time, he was an assistant for Saturday Night Live's photographer, Edie Baskin. Ockenfels' career was launched in earnest in 1988 when he was hired to take a portrait of Tracy Chapman for Rolling Stone. The photograph was initially meant to be a quarter-page in support of Chapman's debut album, but it ended up being a double page spread after Chapman began to rise in popularity. This raised Ockenfels' profile as a photographer. Shortly after the Rolling Stone shoot, Frank met Carol LeFlufy who is still representing him today. In 1989, Ockenfels performed his first photo shoots of David Bowie, and has since photographed him at least 15 more times.

For some period of time in the early 1990s, Ockenfels worked as a director. Over the course of several years, he directed around 20 music videos and 40 commercials. The October 1993 issue of Spin featured a photograph of the band Nirvana taken by Ockenfels. After lead singer Kurt Cobain's death six months later, the magazine used a cropped image of Cobain from the Ockenfels Nirvana shoot as the cover. Ockenfels went on to photograph numerous musical artists and bands including Jay Z, Alicia Keys, Snoop Dogg, Tom Waits, the Yeah Yeah Yeahs, Soundgarden and others.

In 1993, Ockenfels began working on key art and gallery for television and film. His first job was with the ABC miniseries, Murder in the Heartland. Since then, Ockenfels has shot promotional stills for shows and films including Breaking Bad, Mad Men, House of Cards, Pirates of the Caribbean, The Walking Dead, Men in Black 3, American Horror Story, The Bear, and Interview with the Vampire. He has also photographed film actors, directors, and other figures in entertainment and politics, including Angelina Jolie, George Miller, David Lynch, Tom Hanks, and George Clooney. During the 2008 United States presidential election campaign, Ockenfels photographed future president Barack Obama.

Ockenfels has photographed over 200 album covers for artists such as Bruce Springsteen, Sting, Willie Nelson, Wilco, Busta Rhymes, Queen Latifah, Garbage, No Doubt, Soundgarden, and Tom Waits. Ockenfels has also directed music videos for artists such as Alice in Chains, Better Than Ezra, Everclear, and Local H.

In 2012, Ockenfels was honored with the Honorary Key Art Award.

== Style ==
Ockenfels has often been noted for his use of non-photographic elements in his work. He applies techniques like collage, painting, and drawing on top of the photographs. An example of this technique is his portrait of Angelina Jolie, in which the blue-hued photo of the actress has a red "X" painted on her lips. Ockenfels prefers to incorporate natural light and unposed, candid subjects into his photographs, rather than heavily choreographed setups. He typically does not know anything about the subject prior to shooting.

Earlier in his career, Ockenfels often used minimal equipment for his shoots, typically one light and a mid-range Hasselblad camera. He now uses a wide array of cameras and equipment. Early in his career, he would purchase used film cameras from flea markets and use them for jobs. Ockenfels exclusively uses medium format cameras, stating that high-range digital cameras often produce images that are too sharp. He has also been known to modify cameras with wires, circuit boards, and a wide array of lenses. Ockenfels also uses Instagram and often takes photos using his mobile phone.

== Book and gallery exhibitions ==
One of Ockenfels' first solo gallery exhibitions was at the Clark-Oshin Gallery at The Icon in Los Angeles in 2009. An exhibition of Ockenfels' work also appeared at the Kahmann Gallery in Amsterdam in 2014.

In October 2015, a solo exhibition appeared at the Black Eye Gallery near Sydney. His work has also been part of several group shows including the traveling David Bowie is exhibition, which has appeared in museums in London, Chicago, Paris, and Melbourne.

From December 5, 2019 to January 11, 2020, Ockenfels' work was displayed at the Fahey/Klein Gallery, marking his long career and featuring his collaged personal journals, published in his first book, Frank Ockenfels 3, Volume 3.

Ockenfels has also presented the solo exhibition Introspection across several Fotografiska locations, appearing at Fotografiska Stockholm in 2021, Fotografiska Tallinn in 2022, Fotografiska New York in 2023, and Fotografiska Berlin in 2025.

Frank Ockenfels 3, Volume 3 collects images that Ockenfels has altered with ink, collage, or paint, drawn from his personal journals over the course of his career.

== Music videos ==
Music videos directed by Frank W. Ockenfels III
Year	Title	Artist	Ref.
1995	"Rosealia"	Better Than Ezra	
1995	"In The Blood"	Better Than Ezra	
1995	"Love Triangle"	Diana King	
1996	"Heaven Beside You"	Alice in Chains	
1996	"Bound for the Floor"	Local H	
1996	"Automatic"	Chris Whitley	
1997	"Carolina Blues"	Blues Traveler	
1998	"Still Rainin'"	Jonny Lang	
1998	"Touch, Peel and Stand"	Days of the New	
1998	"I Will Buy You a New Life"	Everclear	
