= Pilgrimage Music & Cultural Festival =

American annual arts festival

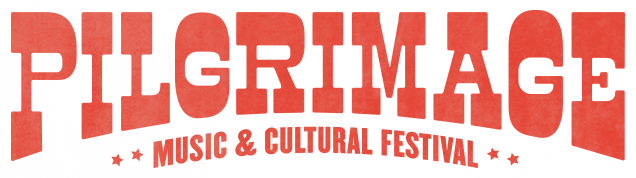
- Genre: Roots rock, country, Americana, gospel, rock, pop, indie rock
- Location: 2 consecutive days in September
- Coordinates: 35.9334°N 86.8619°W
- Years active: 2015–present
- Founders: Kevin Griffin, W. Brandt Wood and Michael Whelan
- Attendance: 27,000
- Website: https://pilgrimagefestival.com/

Pilgrimage Music & Cultural Festival is an annual arts festival in Franklin, Tennessee, USA. The two-day festival began in September 2015. The festival typically takes place in September.

== History ==
Pilgrimage Music & Cultural Festival was co-founded by Better Than Ezra frontman Kevin Griffin. Held at the Franklin's Park at Harlinsdale Farm, the 2015 festival was headlined by Wilco, Willie Nelson, Weezer, The Decemberists and Cage The Elephant.

Beck, Daryl Hall and John Oates and Jason Isbell headlined the 2016 event.

Justin Timberlake (one of its producers), Eddie Vedder, The Avett Brothers, Gary Clark Jr., Ryan Adams and Walk the Moon, led the 2017 line-up.

Jack White, Chris Stapleton and Lionel Richie were among the performers of the 2018 event.

In 2019, headliners were Keith Urban, Foo Fighters and the Killers.

In 2020, due to the global COVID-19 pandemic, the festival was canceled.

In 2021, headliners were Dave Matthews Band and the Black Keys.

In 2022, the headliners were Chris Stapleton and Brandi Carlile.

In 2023, the festival showcased performances by Zach Bryan, The Lumineers, The Black Crowes, and Nathaniel Rateliff & The Night Sweats.

In 2024, headliners for the festival's tenth anniversary included Dave Matthews Band, Hozier, Noah Kahan, and NEEDTOBREATHE.
