= Caddo Magnet High School =

- Mustangs

Location
- 1601 Viking Dr. Shreveport, Louisiana 71101; United States; 32.4971°N 93.7195°W

Information
- School type: Public; Magnet; Math/Science/Performing Arts
- Motto: "In our hands we hold today; in our minds we hold tomorrow."
- Established: 1980
- Founder: Ascension Smith
- School board: Caddo Parish
- Principal: Amanda Dolph
- Teaching staff: 60.89 (FTE)
- Grades: 9–12
- Enrollment: 869 (2024–2025)
- Student to teacher ratio: 14.27
- Colors: Red and gold
- Mascot: Mustang
- Nickname: Mustangs
- Website: www.caddomagnet.net

Caddo Parish Magnet High School (CMHS) is a public high school located in Shreveport, Louisiana, United States. Opened in 1980, Caddo Magnet was founded by its first principal, Ascension Smith. The school colors are gold and red, and the mascot is a Mustang. The current principal is Amanda Dolph.

== Awards and recognition ==
Caddo Parish Magnet High School has received several national honors for academic performance and student achievement since its founding in 1980.

=== Academic Decathlon ===
Caddo Magnet won the Academic Decathlon contest for Louisiana each year from 1983 through 2011. This is the longest streak of any school in the nation, and the longest in the history of the competition.

=== U.S. Department of Education awards ===
Caddo Parish Magnet High School has been named a National Blue Ribbon School twice by the U.S. Department of Education:

- 2008 – Selected as a No Child Left Behind–Blue Ribbon School.
- 2018 – Named an Exemplary High Performing School (the school’s second Blue Ribbon award).

In 2022 the school was designated a Green Ribbon School by the U.S. Department of Education for its efforts in environmental sustainability, health and wellness, and related education.

=== Academic competitions and rankings ===
The school has been recognized by U.S. News & World Report as a Silver Medal winner (top 3% of high schools nationally) and has ranked among the top high schools in the United States in recent national rankings.

=== Athletics ===
Students participating in varsity and lifetime sports have won district competitions and advanced to the state levels. During the 2007–2008 season of high school varsity soccer, the Caddo Magnet boys won the state championship and were ranked as high as No. 2 in the nation by the National Soccer Coaches Association of America (NSCAA).

== Admissions ==
To be admitted to Caddo Magnet, students must:

- Have a 2.5 grade point average at the time of application.
- Have a score on the most recent school-administered nationally standardized test showing the reading level at the 50th percentile or better.
- Have 95% or better school attendance.
- Have maintained a good discipline record.
- Express high motivation and interest toward excellence in the academics or the arts.
- Have parental/guardian consent and support.
- Have taken and passed the English/Language Arts and Math components of LEAP 21.

In order to remain in good standing at Caddo Magnet, students must:

- Maintain a cumulative 2.5 grade point average.
- Conform to behavior standards set by the Caddo Parish School Board and Caddo Magnet High School.

== Athletics ==
Caddo Magnet High athletics competes in the LHSAA

Sports:
Archery
Cross Country/Track
Fencing
Golf
Gymnastics
Lacrosse—Men's
Soccer—Ladies'
Soccer—Men's
Softball
Swimming
Tennis
Volleyball
E-Sports
Powerlifting

== Alumni ==
Alumnus	Class	Field	Remarks
Brady Blade	1983	Music	Prolific drummer with many bands. Recently on the David Letterman show.
Brian Blade	1988	Music	Grammy award-winning drummer. Played with Aretha Franklin for President Barack Obama for the White House Jazz Festival.
Tom Drummond	1987	Music	Bassist for Better Than Ezra
Cedric Glover	1983	Government	Member of the Louisiana House of Representatives, representing District 4. He was earlier the two-term mayor of Shreveport, Louisiana, the first African-American to hold that position.
Jonas Kelsall	1996	Military	Navy SEAL (Lt. Cmdr.). KIA 6 August 2011 in Wardak Province, Afghanistan.
Michelle Khare	2010		YouTuber, television host, actress, former professional cyclist
Henry Lin	2013	Science	Forbes 30 Under 30 Scientists.
Robert Reeves (Navy SEAL)	1997	Military	Navy SEAL (Senior Chief Petty Officer). KIA 6 August 2011 in Wardak Province, Afghanistan.
Kenny Wayne Shepherd	1995	Music	5 Grammy Award nominations.

== See also ==
- Caddo Parish Schools
