= Delta Hardware =

Studio album by Charlie Musselwhite
- Released: May 16, 2006
- Studio: Record Plant, Sausalito CA; Capitol Studios, Hollywood CA
- Genre: Delta blues, electric blues
- Length: 40:03
- Label: Real World
- Producer: Chris Goldsmith

Charlie Musselwhite chronology
Sanctuary (2004)	Delta Hardware (2006)	The Well (2010)

Professional ratings
Review scores
Source	Rating
AllMusic	4.5/5 stars
Artistdirect	4.5/5 stars

Delta Hardware is the twenty fourth studio album by blues harp player and vocalist Charlie Musselwhite. The album was released in 2006, on Real World Records. It is Musselwhite's second release on Real World Records, his first being Sanctuary in 2004. Musselwhite also plays electric guitar on "Town to Town". The front cover was photographed by Charles Evans at 331 Sunflower Avenue, Clarksdale, Mississippi.

== Track listing ==
1. "Church is Out" (Charlie Musselwhite) - 3:32
2. "One of These Mornings" (Walter Jacobs) - 2:36
3. "Sundown" (Musselwhite) - 4:06
4. "Black Water" (Chris Goldsmith, Musselwhite) - 5:40
5. "Clarksdale Boogie" (Musselwhite) – 3:38
6. "Just a Feeling" (Walter Jacobs) - 5:15
7. "Gone Too Long" (Walter Arnold) - 2:58
8. "Invisible Ones" (Julio Bermudes, Musselwhite) - 3:32
9. "Town to Town" (Musselwhite) - 3:16
10. "Blues for Yesterday" (Musselwhite) - 5:23

== Personnel ==
- Charlie Musselwhite - vocals, harmonica; electric guitar on "Town to Town"
- Chris "Kid" Andersen - guitars
- Randy Bermudes - bass guitar
- June Core - drums, percussion
