= How Does Your Garden Grow? (disambiguation) =

How Does Your Garden Grow? may refer to:

- A line from the nursery rhyme, "Mary, Mary, Quite Contrary":

Mary, Mary, quite contrary,
How does your garden grow?

- the album How Does Your Garden Grow? by Better Than Ezra
- the short story How Does Your Garden Grow? by Agatha Christie
- the play How Does Your Garden Grow? by Jim McNeil
