= Closer (Better Than Ezra album) =

Studio album by Better Than Ezra
- Released: August 7, 2001
- Recorded: January 2001
- Genres: Alternative rock, post-grunge
- Length: 42:47
- Labels: Beyond; Better Than Ezra (2009 reissue)
- Producers: Brad Wood, Ethan Allen

Better Than Ezra chronology
How Does Your Garden Grow? (1998)	Closer (2001)	Live at the House of Blues, New Orleans (2004)

Professional ratings
Aggregate scores
Source	Rating
Metacritic	64/100
Review scores
Source	Rating
AllMusic	3.5/5 stars

Closer is the fifth studio album by the New Orleans–based rock trio Better Than Ezra. It was released on August 7, 2001, by Beyond Music. Closer initially performed better than its predecessor, How Does Your Garden Grow?, peaking at #110 on the Billboard charts. The first single off the album, "Extra Ordinary," placed on both the Billboard Modern Rock and Adult Top 40 charts (it was the eighth and last BTE single to date to place on the Modern Rock charts). A second single, "Misunderstood," was planned, but Beyond Records declared bankruptcy before it could be released.

As of early 2007, Closer was out of print due to Beyond Music going out of business and copies were scarce, though some were still in stock in stores. Legal problems resulting from Beyond's bankruptcy meant it would be four years before Better than Ezra's next studio album, Before the Robots. In the meantime, the band would release a live album in 2004, recorded in their hometown at the House of Blues.

In June 2009, the band announced they had acquired the rights to "Closer" and all of the master tracks recorded during the sessions for the album, and would be reissuing it via their own label on CD, The re-release was made available in October 2009 via the band's online store, sporting a bright new red cover, and two bonus tracks, "Simple Song", a long-standing fan favorite, and "Screwed Up And Beautiful". Both tracks were recorded during the 2001 sessions for the album but omitted from the final record.

== Track listing ==
All tracks by Kevin Griffin

1. "Misunderstood" – 3:46
2. "Extra Ordinary" (featuring DJ Swamp) – 3:37
3. "Closer" – 4:31
4. "Rolling" (featuring Toddy Walters) – 3:31
5. "A Lifetime" – 3:36
6. "Recognize" (featuring DJ Swamp) – 3:18
7. "Sincerely, Me" – 3:53
8. "Get You In" – 4:07
9. "Briefly" – 4:19
10. "Juarez" – 4:26
11. "I Do" – 3:44

2009 reissue

12. "Screwed Up and Beautiful" – 3:09
13. "Simple Song" – 4:41

== Personnel ==
- Kevin Griffin – Guitar, Piano, Vocals
- Tom Drummond – Bass
- Travis McNabb – Drums

=== Additional personnel ===
- Tim Palmer - Mixing
- Mark Mullins – Trombone
- Eric Lucero – Trumpet
- David Campbell String Arrangements
- James Arthur Payne – Guitar
- Toddy Walters – Backing Vocals
- DJ Swamp – turntables
- DJ Wolf (Chick Wolverton) – keyboards, turntables
- Michael Goods – Rhodes, Organ

==== Quartet Illumina ====
- Guenevere Measham – Cello
- Leah Katz – Viola
- Daphne Chen – Violin
- Melissa Reiner – Violin
