= Live at the House of Blues, New Orleans =

Live at House of Blues New Orleans

Live album by Better Than Ezra
- Released: September 28, 2004
- Genre: Alternative rock

Better Than Ezra chronology
| Closer (2001) | Live at House of Blues New Orleans (2004) | Greatest Hits (2005) |

Live at House of Blues New Orleans is a live album and DVD released by the band Better Than Ezra on September 28, 2004 as their sixth album, first of two live albums, and their only on Sanctuary Records. The album and DVD were recorded and filmed at two separate shows at the House of Blues in New Orleans during the summer of 2004 and have different track listings. The DVD is longer as it has eight tracks not available on the CD. Additionally, there are two studio tracks featured on the CD that are not on the DVD.

The album features then current band members; Kevin Griffin - lead vocals, guitar (1988–present), Tom Drummond - bass guitar, backing vocals (1988–present), Travis McNabb - drums (1996 - 2009), and James Arthur Payne - Guitar, Keyboards, backing vocals. The album also features three guest musicians; Mark Mullins -trombonist, Eric Lucero - trumpeter, and John Gros - B3 Organ Player.

== CD ==
1. "Intro"
2. "Misunderstood"
3. "Good"
4. "Rolling"
5. "Live Again"
6. "Get You In"
7. "Extra Ordinary"
8. "King of New Orleans"
9. "Rosealia"
10. "At the Stars"
11. "A Lifetime"
12. "In the Blood"
13. "Porcelain"
14. "Sincerely, Me"
15. "Desperately Wanting"
16. "Cold Year" (new studio track)
17. "Stall" (new studio track)

== DVD ==
1. "Intro"
2. "Recognize" [DVD only]
3. "Misunderstood"
4. "Good"
5. "Rolling"
6. "Live Again"
7. "Allison Foley" [DVD only]
8. "Get You In"
9. "Extra Ordinary"
10. "King of New Orleans"
11. "Rosealia"
12. "Beautiful Mistake" DVD only
13. "At the Stars"
14. "Waxing or Waning" [DVD only]
15. "A Lifetime"
16. "This Time of Year" [DVD only]
17. "Sincerely, Me"
18. "Desperately Wanting"
19. "Porcelain" [DVD only]
20. "In the Blood" [DVD only]
21. "Use Me" (Bill Withers cover) [DVD only]

== Personnel ==
- Kevin Griffin - Lead vocals, guitar
- Travis McNabb - Drums
- Tom Drummond - Bass, backing vocals
- James Arthur Payne - Guitar, Keyboards, backing vocals
- Mark Mullins -trombonist
- Eric Lucero - trumpeter
- John Gros - B3 Organ Player

== Official Site ==
www.betterthanezra.com
