= Super Magick =

Studio album by Better Than Ezra
- Released: May 3, 2024
- Studio: Pink Deer
- Length: 41:14
- Label: Round Hill
- Producers: Brennan Aerts; Stephen Aiello; Wes Bailey; Luke Dick; Emery Dobyns; Kevin Griffin; Andrew Petroff; Marc Scibilia; Gabe Simon

Better Than Ezra chronology
All Together Now (2014)	Super Magick (2024)

Super Magick is the ninth studio album from the New Orleans–based rock group Better Than Ezra, released on May 3, 2024. It is the band's first album in 10 years.

The alternative rock album is produced by frontman Kevin Griffin and Emery Dobyns and was recorded at Pink Deer Studios.

== Release ==
On March 8, 2024, it was announced that the album would be released on May 3, 2024. The album cover was also revealed, which contains Theban writing of track names: "Mystify", "Contact (High)", "Fuzzy", "Grateful", "Live (A Little)", "Omens", "and Super Magick".

"This Time" was written by Griffin in 2009, though it was originally released on the self-titled debut album of an Italian operatic pop trio, Il Volo.

In between All Together Now and Super Magick, the group produced several live albums and a few singles. Griffin also released a solo album.

=== Singles ===
In 2018, "Grateful" was released as a single, six years before the album.

"Contact High" and "Mystified" were both released prior to the album's announcement. "Live a Little" was later released as a single ahead of the album.

== Track listing ==
Super Magick track listing
No.	Title	Writer(s)	Producer(s)	Length
1.	"Mystified"	Kevin Griffin; Henry Brill	Griffin; Emery Dobyns	3:57
2.	"Live a Little"	Griffin; Stephen Aiello; Chaz McKinney	Griffin; Brennan Aerts; Aiello	2:35
3.	"Show Em Up"	Griffin; Wes Bailey; Sam Hollander	Griffin; Dobyns; Bailey	3:13
4.	"Super Magick"	Griffin; Brill; Dobys	Griffin; Dobyns	3:56
5.	"This Time"	Griffin; Michael Busbee; Michelle Lewis	Marc Scibilia	3:01
6.	"Contact High"	Griffin; Dobyns	Griffin; Dobyns	3:49
7.	"Grateful"	Griffin; Scibilia	Griffin; Andrew Petroff	3:12
8.	"Sensation"	Griffin; Trent Dabbs	Griffin; Dobyns	4:12
9.	"Bad Communication"	Griffin; Griffin; Gabriel Edward Simon	Gabe Simon	3:24
10.	"Fuzzy"	Griffin; Luke Dick	Griffin; Dobyns; Dick	2:58
11.	"Omens"	Griffin; Bailey	Griffin; Petroff	3:21
12.	"Killing It"	Griffin; Brill	Griffin; Dobyns	3:36
Total length:				41:14

== Personnel ==
Better Than Ezra

- Tom Drummond – bass
- Kevin Griffin – lead vocals (all tracks), acoustic and electric guitars, background vocals (tracks 2–4, 9–12)
- James Arthur Payne Jr. – keyboards, synthesizer, piano and electric guitar
- Michael Jerome – drums

Additional contributors

- Pete Lyman – mastering
- Chris Dugan – mixing (tracks 1, 2, 5–10, 12)
- Ryan Hewitt – mixing (tracks 3, 4, 11)
- Drew Bollman – engineering (tracks 1–8, 10–12)
- Gabe Simon – engineering (track 9)
- Kristen Rogers – background vocals (tracks 1, 3, 8)
- Emery Dobyns – background vocals (tracks 4, 8, 12)
- Henry Brill – background vocals (track 4)
