= Our Last Night (song) =

Single by Better Than Ezra

from the album Before the Robots
- Released: 2005
- Genre: Alternative rock
- Label: Artemis
- Songwriter: Kevin Griffin

Better Than Ezra singles chronology
"A Lifetime" (2005)	"Our Last Night" (2005)	"Juicy" (2006)

"Our Last Night" is the second single from the 2005 Better Than Ezra studio album, Before the Robots, written by lead vocalist, Kevin Griffin. It was released as a commercial single in 2005.

== Reception ==
"Our Last Night" reached No. 28 on the Billboard Adult Top 40 chart in 2005.

== Chart performance ==
Chart (2005)	Peak position
U.S. Billboard Adult Top 40	28
