= One Night in America =

Studio album by Charlie Musselwhite
- Released: February 26, 2002
- Recorded: June 2001
- Genre: Blues
- Length: 49:49
- Label: Telarc
- Producer: Randy Labbe

Charlie Musselwhite chronology
| Up and Down the Highway: Live 1986 (2000) | One Night in America (2002) | Sanctuary (2004) |

Professional ratings
Review scores
| Source | Rating |
|---|---|
| Allmusic | 4/5 stars |
| The Penguin Guide to Blues Recordings | 2/4 stars |

One Night in America is the twenty first studio album by American blues singer and harmonica player Charlie Musselwhite. It was released in February 2002 on Telarc record label and it was Musselwhite's debut and only release on this label.

== Track listing ==
1. "Trail of Tears" (Allen Reynolds, Roger Cook) – 4:17
2. "Cold Grey Light of Dawn" (Ivory Joe Hunter) – 2:55
3. "Blues Overtook Me" (Musselwhite) – 4:26
4. "In a Town This Size" (Kieran Kane) – 3:38
5. "Walking Alone" (Pontus Snibb) – 4:45
6. "Rank Strangers to Me" (Albert E. Brumley) – 4:34
7. "One Time One Night" (David Hidalgo, Louie Pérez) – 4:42
8. "In Your Darkest Hour" (Musselwhite) – 4:29
9. "Big River" (John R. Cash) – 5:20
10. "Ain't It Time" (Musselwhite) – 4:18
11. "I'll Meet You Over There" (Musselwhite) – 2:51
12. "Ain't That Lovin' You Baby" (Jimmy Reed) – 2:56

== Personnel ==
- Charlie Musselwhite – vocals, harmonica
- G. E. Smith – guitar
- Robben Ford – guitar
- Marty Stuart – guitar, mandolin
- T-Bone Wolk – bass
- Peter Re – organ
- Michael Jerome – drums
- Per Hanson – drums
- Christine Ohlman – vocals
- Kelly Willis – vocals
