= Extra Ordinary =

2001 single by Better Than Ezra

Single by Better Than Ezra

from the album Closer
- Released: July 2001
- Recorded: 2001
- Genre: Alternative rock
- Length: 3:40
- Label: Beyond Music
- Songwriter: Kevin Griffin

Better Than Ezra singles chronology
"Like It Like That" (1999)	"Extra Ordinary" (2001)	"A Lifetime" (2005)

"Extra Ordinary" is a song by American alternative rock group Better Than Ezra. It was released in July 2001 as their first single from their album Closer. It was also featured in a McDonald's television commercial that aired during the 2002 Winter Olympics.

== Content ==
Lead singer Kevin Griffin told the LAUNCHcast website that the song is about the simple things in life: "I wanted to write lyrics that kind of encapsulated a picture of the current events of my life or anybody's life and just use very common visual images like 'soap on a rope' and 'smart as Bobby Fischer.' You know, it's about just spending the day with somebody you love and hanging out with really no agenda at all. And just being happy."

In a 2002 article from the Baton Rouge Advocate, drummer Travis McNabb said of the band's decision to use the song in a commercial: "They called us and said they wanted to use it in an ad....We were like, 'Is it gonna be Ronald McDonald running around chasing the Hamburglar or something?' But when we found out the concept of the ad, it sounded like a good fit. Ultimately, it's just more exposure for the music and for the band. We've gotten a great response from it. It's funny, though, how in the past five to seven years everyone's view of that sort of thing has changed. It used to be that any kind of sponsorship would be harshly judged by music fans and critics."

The song reached #13 on the Billboard Adult Top 40 chart, #35 on the Modern Rock Tracks chart, and #11 on the Top 40 Adult Recurrents chart.

== Chart performance ==
Chart (2001)	Peak position
U.S. Billboard Modern Rock Tracks	35
U.S. Billboard Adult Top 40	13
