= Stand Back! Here Comes Charley Musselwhite's Southside Band =

Stand Back! Here Comes Charley Musselwhite's South Side Band

Studio album by Charlie Musselwhite's South Side Band
- Released: 1967
- Genre: Chicago blues
- Length: 45:48
- Label: Vanguard
- Producers: Samuel Charters, Barry Goldberg

Charlie Musselwhite's South Side Band chronology
Stand Back! Here Comes Charley Musselwhite's South Side Band (1967)	Blues from Chicago (1968)

Stand Back! Here Comes Charley Musselwhite's South Side Band is the 1967 debut album of American blues-harp musician Charlie Musselwhite, leading Charlie Musselwhite's Southside Band. The Vanguard Records release brought Musselwhite to notability among blues musicians . With rough vocals and notable performances on harmonica, guitar and bass guitar, the album was critically well received. It introduced Musselwhite's signature song, his cover of Duke Pearson's "Cristo Redemptor".

== Critical reception and influence ==
Professional ratings
Review scores
Source	Rating
Allmusic	5/5 stars
The Penguin Guide to Blues Recordings	2.5/4 stars

The album has been critically well-received, described as "legendary", "seminal", and "one of the classic blues albums of the decade." Its success established Musselwhite in the field of blues music and rock and roll. The Southside Band, named for Chicago's South Side, was a combination of blues rhythm section—with Fred Below and Bob Anderson—and rock-influenced musicians Barry Goldberg and Harvey Mandel. The album's success allowed Musselwhite to launch a career as a full-time musician, relocating from Chicago to California, and also secured his reputation as a harmonica player whose collaborations have included Muddy Waters, Howlin' Wolf, Tom Waits, Ben Harper, Cyndi Lauper and INXS. The album is among Musselwhite's most successful.

== Music ==
Among the album's tracks, "Cristo Redemptor" has remained particularly important in Musselwhite's repertoire, standing as his signature song, although subsequent versions of the Duke Pearson cover have been longer. Musselwhite's music here is characterized by smooth harmonica a "harsh, almost strained voice" that Allmusic indicates is "considerably more affected than...later [vocals] (clearer, more relaxed)". Mandel's guitar work, influential, features what Legends of Rock Guitar describes as "relentless fuzztone, feedback-edged solos, and unusual syncopated phrasing." Allmusic highlights the guitarist's "snakey stuttering style", particularly on track "Chicken Shack" in which it "truly makes you think your record is skipping." Bass player Bob Anderson, who later played with Howlin' Wolf, has been singled out for a noteworthy rendition of the classic root-♭3rd-4th progression in the song "Help Me".

== Release history ==
First released in 1967 on Vanguard Records, catalogue numbers VRS-9232 (monaural) and VSD-79232 (stereo), the album has been re-released several times on LP and CD by Vanguard and Ace.

== Track listing ==
Unless otherwise indicated, the composer is uncredited.

1. "Baby Will You Please Help Me" (Charlie Musselwhite) – 3:20
2. "No More Lonely Nights" – 5:14
3. "Cha Cha the Blues" – 3:13
4. "Christo Redemptor" [correct title = "Cristo Redentor"] (Duke Pearson) – 3:21
5. "Help Me (Aleck Rice Miller AKA "Sonny Boy Williamson") – 3:29
6. "Chicken Shack" (Jimmy Smith) – 4:17
7. "Strange Land" (Musselwhite) – 3:04
8. "39th and Indiana" (Musselwhite) – 4:12
9. "My Baby" – 2:46
10. "Early in the Morning" (John Lee "Sonny Boy" Williamson) – 4:31
11. "4 P.M." (Harvey Mandel) – 3:17
12. "Sad Day" (Barry Goldberg) – 5:04

== Personnel ==
- Bob Anderson – bass
- Fred Below – drums
- Samuel Charters – producer
- Barry Goldberg – organ, piano, keyboards
- Harvey Mandel – guitar
- Charlie Musselwhite – harmonica, vocals
- Pete Welding – liner notes
