= Joel Rundell =

- Born: September 26, 1965
- Died: August 8, 1990 (aged 24)
- Genres: Alternative rock
- Instruments: Guitar
- Formerly of: Better Than Ezra, Aces Up

Joel Rundell (September 26, 1965 – August 8, 1990) was an American musician best known as one of the four original members and lead guitarist of the Louisiana-based alternative rock band Better Than Ezra. He and the other original members formed the group while attending Louisiana State University.

Rundell died by suicide on August 8, 1990, nearly a year after the release of the band's first album, Surprise. After his death, the band went on hiatus before reuniting as a trio by the end of 1990.

In 2016, Rundell's family and former drummer Cary Bonnecaze sued the Better Than Ezra, contending that the band did not have the right to re-release the 25th anniversary re-mastered edition of Surprise.

== Discography ==
=== with Better Than Ezra ===
- Surprise (1990)
