= Paper Empire =

Studio album by Better Than Ezra
- Released: May 12, 2009
- Recorded: 2008
- Genre: Alternative rock
- Length: 47:14
- Label: MRI/Megaforce Records
- Producers: Warren Huart, Kevin Griffin

Better Than Ezra chronology
Before the Robots (2005)	Paper Empire (2009)	All Together Now (2014)

Professional ratings
Review scores
Source	Rating
AllMusic	3.5/5 stars
JustPressPlay	(6/10)

Paper Empire is the seventh studio album by the New Orleans–based rock trio Better Than Ezra, released on May 12, 2009, through Red Distribution. It is the first album to feature new drummer Michael Jerome following the departure of former drummer Travis McNabb in February 2009 after 13 years with Better Than Ezra. Album art and packaging were designed by Lorin Brown at One & Done Studio.

== Songs ==
Better Than Ezra vocalist Kevin Griffin co-wrote nine of the twelve songs on Paper Empire. Griffin co-wrote four songs with songwriter busbee, who also wrote the Rascal Flatts single "Summer Nights". The track "Hey Love" was co-written by Griffin and country music songwriter Monty Powell.

"Absolutely Still", the album's first single, was co-written with Val Emmich, whose version of the song appears on the Emmich's album "Sunlight Searchparty". However, Emmich departed his label, Epic Records, before "Sunlight Searchparty" was released. Griffin decided that "Absolutely Still" had potential and re-recorded it with Better Than Ezra for the album.

"Just One Day" and "Fit" were also co-written with singer-songwriter Jeremy Lister. Lister's versions of the songs appear on his 2007 debut album, Just One Day EP, released by Warner Bros. Records.

The track "All In" was written by James Bourne, a former member of the guitar-pop band Busted (which also performs back-up vocals on the track).

== Track listing ==
All lyrics and music by Kevin Griffin, except where noted.

No.	Title	Lyrics	Music	Length
1.	"Absolutely Still"	Val Emmich		3:58
2.	"Turn Up the Bright Lights"	Michelle Lewis	Griffin, busbee	3:38
3.	"Just One Day"	Griffin, Kelli Anne Owens	Griffin, Johnny Lee Andrews, Jeremy Lister	4:02
4.	"The Loveless"			4:24
5.	"All In"	James Bourne	Griffin, busbee	3:28
6.	"Fit"		Griffin, Lister	3:56
7.	"Hell No!"			3:04
8.	"Hey Love"		Griffin, Monty Powell	4:19
9.	"Nightclubbing"	Jeff Tucker, Griffin		3:24
10.	"Black Light"		Griffin, busbee	3:33
11.	"Wounded"		Griffin, busbee	4:41
12.	"I Just Knew"			4:47
Total length:				47:14

iTunes bonus track version
No.	Title	Length
13.	"In Between Moments"	4:05
Total length:		51:19

== Personnel ==
- Kevin Griffin – Guitar, Piano, Vocals
- Tom Drummond – Bass
- Michael Jerome – Drums
- Tim Palmer – Mixing
