= Deluxe (Better Than Ezra album) =

Studio album by Better Than Ezra
- Released: November 16, 1993
- Recorded: May & June 1993
- Genres: Alternative rock, post-grunge, jangle pop
- Length: 53:39
- Labels: Swell (1993); Elektra (1995)
- Producer: Dan Rothchild

Better Than Ezra chronology
Surprise (1989)	Deluxe (1993)	Friction, Baby (1996)

Singles from Deluxe
- 1. "Good" Released: February 1995; 2. "In the Blood" Released: June 1995; 3. "Rosealia" Released: November 7, 1995

Professional ratings
Review scores
Source	Rating
AllMusic	3/5 stars

Deluxe is a studio album by the alternative rock band Better Than Ezra. It has been released by two labels: the original version on November 16, 1993 by Swell Records, and on February 28, 1995 by Elektra Records. This is the group's best known album and contains their biggest single, "Good". It is also their debut major label record, as Surprise was entirely self-released and sold.

== Track listing ==
All songs written by Kevin Griffin, except "Heaven" by Kevin Griffin and Tom Drummond.

1. "In the Blood" – 4:33
2. "Good" – 3:05
3. "Southern Gürl" – 4:05
4. "The Killer Inside" – 4:50
5. "Rosealia" – 4:39
6. "Cry in the Sun" – 5:19
7. "Teenager" – 4:18
8. – 1:36
9. "Summerhouse" – 2:37
10. "Porcelain" – 3:57
11. "Heaven" – 4:18
12. "This Time of Year" – 4:05
13. "Coyote" – 6:14
  - "Der Pork und Beans" (a.k.a. "Streetside Jesus") – This hidden industrial metal song begins playing at the 4:20 mark of track 13, 1 minute and 9 seconds after the end of "Coyote."

== Personnel ==
- Kevin Griffin – Guitar, Vocals
- Tom Drummond – Bass
- Cary Bonnecaze – Drums, Vocals

Additional personnel

- Lili Haydn – Violin
- Melanie Owen – Vocals
- Dan Rothchild – Vocals, Additional Guitar and Various Instruments
- Walt Thompson – Hammond Organ
- Martin Tillman – Cello

== Charts ==
=== Weekly charts ===
Chart (1995)	Peak position
Australian Albums (ARIA)	151
US Billboard 200	35

=== Year-end charts ===
Chart (1995)	Position
US Billboard 200	110

== Certifications ==
Region	Certification	Certified units/sales
Canada (Music Canada)	Gold	50,000^{^}
United States (RIAA)	Platinum	1,000,000^{^}
^{^} Shipments figures based on certification alone.
