= Before the Robots =

Studio album by Better Than Ezra
- Released: April 4, 2005
- Recorded: 2005
- Genres: Alternative rock, country rock, Southern rock
- Length: 51:55
- Label: Artemis
- Producers: BTE, Ethan Allen

Better Than Ezra chronology
| Greatest Hits (2005) | Before the Robots (2005) | Paper Empire (2009) |

Singles from Before the Robots
- 1. "A Lifetime" Released: 2005; 2. "Our Last Night" Released: 2005; 3. "Juicy" Released: 2006

Professional ratings
Review scores
| Source | Rating |
|---|---|
| AllMusic | link |

Before the Robots is the studio follow-up album to Better Than Ezra's 2001 studio release Closer and debut album on Artemis Records. It was released on April 4, 2005, internationally and a day later in North America.

The band enjoyed their biggest success since 1996's Friction, Baby on the reworked single "A Lifetime", which first appeared on 2001's Closer. The tracks "A Southern Thing" and "Our Last Night" also gained some radio airplay. Additionally, the album track "Juicy" was the featured music in promotions for the second season of the ABC series Desperate Housewives.

Prior to the album's release, the band offered to autograph all copies of the album pre-ordered through their website.

The album title reportedly came to the band's drummer Travis McNabb in a dream. He dreamt of seeing a UK buzz band called Before the Robots. The next day, he asked fellow band members if there was such a band. Upon finding out there was not, they decided to adopt the phrase for this album's title.

On January 22, 2010, the American singer-songwriter Taylor Swift covered "Breathless" at a performance at the Hope for Haiti Now: A Global Benefit for Earthquake Relief event, a charity telethon to benefit the victims of the 2010 Haiti earthquake. Swift has also been known to cover "Our Last Night" at many of her concerts.

== Track listing ==
All tracks are written by Kevin Griffin.

| No. | Title | Length |
|---|---|---|
| 1. | "Burned" | 3:41 |
| 2. | "Daylight" | 3:54 |
| 3. | "A Lifetime" | 3:27 |
| 4. | "It's Only Natural" | 4:16 |
| 5. | "Overcome" | 5:22 |
| 6. | "Special" | 4:03 |
| 7. | "American Dream" | 3:39 |
| 8. | "Our Last Night" | 4:12 |
| 9. | "A Southern Thing" | 4:02 |
| 10. | "Juicy" | 3:53 |
| 11. | "Hollow" | 3:30 |
| 12. | "Our Finest Year" | 4:21 |
| 13. | "Breathless" | 3:35 |
| Total length: | | 51:55 |

== Personnel ==
Better Than Ezra

- Tom Drummond – bass guitar
- Kevin Griffin – vocals, guitar, piano
- Travis Aaron McNabb – drums

Additional personnel

- Tim Palmer – Mixing
- Greg Collins – engineering
- Jon Gros – B3 organ, Whirly, Rhodes
- Jason Hill – background vocals
- Brian Karzcig – background vocals
- Eric Lucero – trumpet
- Mark Mullins – trombone
