= Friction, Baby =

Studio album by Better Than Ezra
- Released: August 13, 1996
- Recorded: March 25–April 27, 1996
- Genres: Alternative rock, post-grunge
- Length: 51:44
- Label: Swell/Elektra
- Producer: Don Gehman

Better Than Ezra chronology
Deluxe (1995)	Friction, Baby (1996)	How Does Your Garden Grow? (1998)

Singles from Friction, Baby
- 1. "King of New Orleans" Released: July 1996; 2. "Desperately Wanting" Released: December 3, 1996; 3. "Long Lost" Released: 1997; 4. "Normal Town" Released: 1997

Professional ratings
Review scores
Source	Rating
AllMusic	3/5 stars
Spin	6/10

Friction, Baby is the third studio album by Better Than Ezra, released in 1996.

The album's title comes from a television interview with Keith Richards of the Rolling Stones. When asked how he and Mick Jagger stayed together for so long, Richards took a long drag from his cigarette and said "friction, baby." This may also be a reference to the fact that the band had replaced its original drummer, Cary Bonnecaze, between the recording of their previous album and this one.

The album produced two hits on the Billboard modern rock charts: "King of New Orleans" and "Desperately Wanting." "Desperately Wanting" also narrowly missed the Billboard Top 40, peaking at #48. The third and fourth singles, "Long Lost" and "Normal Town," failed to chart.

== Critical reception ==
In its review, The A.V. Club called Friction, Baby "a batch of low-impact pop cheese that's too mindlessly catchy not to be likable."

== Track listing ==
1. "King of New Orleans" – 4:07
2. "Rewind" – 3:07
3. "Long Lost" – 3:40
4. "Normal Town" – 3:39
5. "Scared, Are You?" – 4:06
6. "Return of the Post Moderns" – 2:54
7. "Hung the Moon" – 3:46
8. "Desperately Wanting" – 4:37
9. "Still Life with Cooley" – 3:58
10. "WWOZ" – 4:20
11. "Happy Endings" – 2:43
12. "Speeding Up to Slow Down" – 4:09
13. "At Ch. Degaulle, Etc." – 6:37
  - "Mejor de Ezra" (3:17) starts at 3:20 into the track.

On early copies of the album, the hidden track "Mejor de Ezra" is contained in the pregap. Later copies of the album tack this secret track onto the end of the album.

All songs were composed by Kevin Griffin.

== Personnel ==
- Kevin Griffin – Guitar, Vocals
- Tom Drummond – Bass
- Travis McNabb – Drums

=== Additional personnel ===
- Joan Wasser – Violin
- Peter Holsapple – Piano, Organ, Mandolin
- Anthony Dagrade – Saxophone, Clarinet, Flute
- Jamil Sharie – Trumpet
- Mark Mullins – Trombone
- Matthew Perrine – Tuba
- Lawrence Sieberth – Piano

=== Weekly charts ===
Chart (1996)	Peak position
Australian Albums (ARIA)	163
