= Michael Jerome =

American drummer

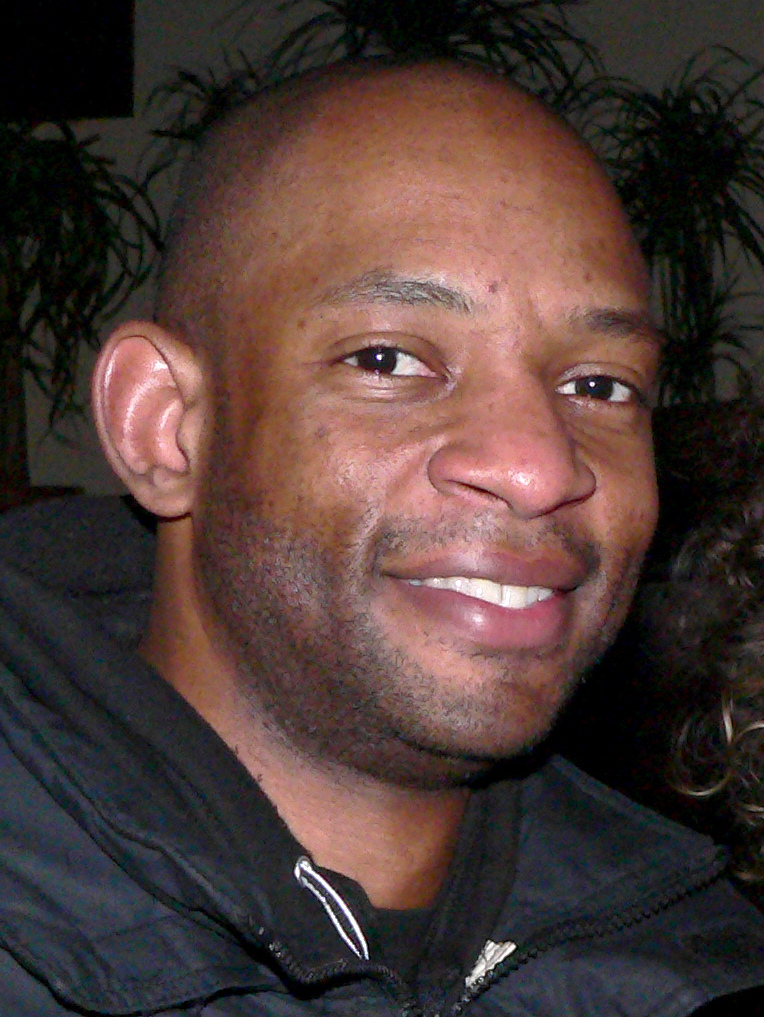
- Jerome in 2006

Background information
- Born: Michael Jerome Moore; July 7, 1971 (age 55); Wichita, Kansas, U.S.
- Genre: Rock
- Occupations: Musician
- Instruments: Drums

Michael Jerome Moore is an American rock musician and drummer. He is a former member of Pop Poppins (1989-1997), the Toadies (1990–91), Course of Empire (1994–1998), and James Hall's band Pleasure Club, which was formed in 2002. He was a member of the Saginaw, Texas band Pop Poppins, a metroplex cult follow. He played on Charlie Musselwhite's 2004 release Sanctuary, and has also toured or recorded with Blind Boys of Alabama, John Cale, Anna Egge, Tom Freund and many others. Jerome is double-jointed and ambidextrous.

Jerome joined the Louisiana-based band Better Than Ezra in 2009, following the departure of the band's drummer of 13 years, Travis McNabb, who had amicably left Better Than Ezra in February 2009 in order to tour full-time with Sugarland. Better Than Ezra's 2009 album, Paper Empire, marked Jerome's recording debut with the band.

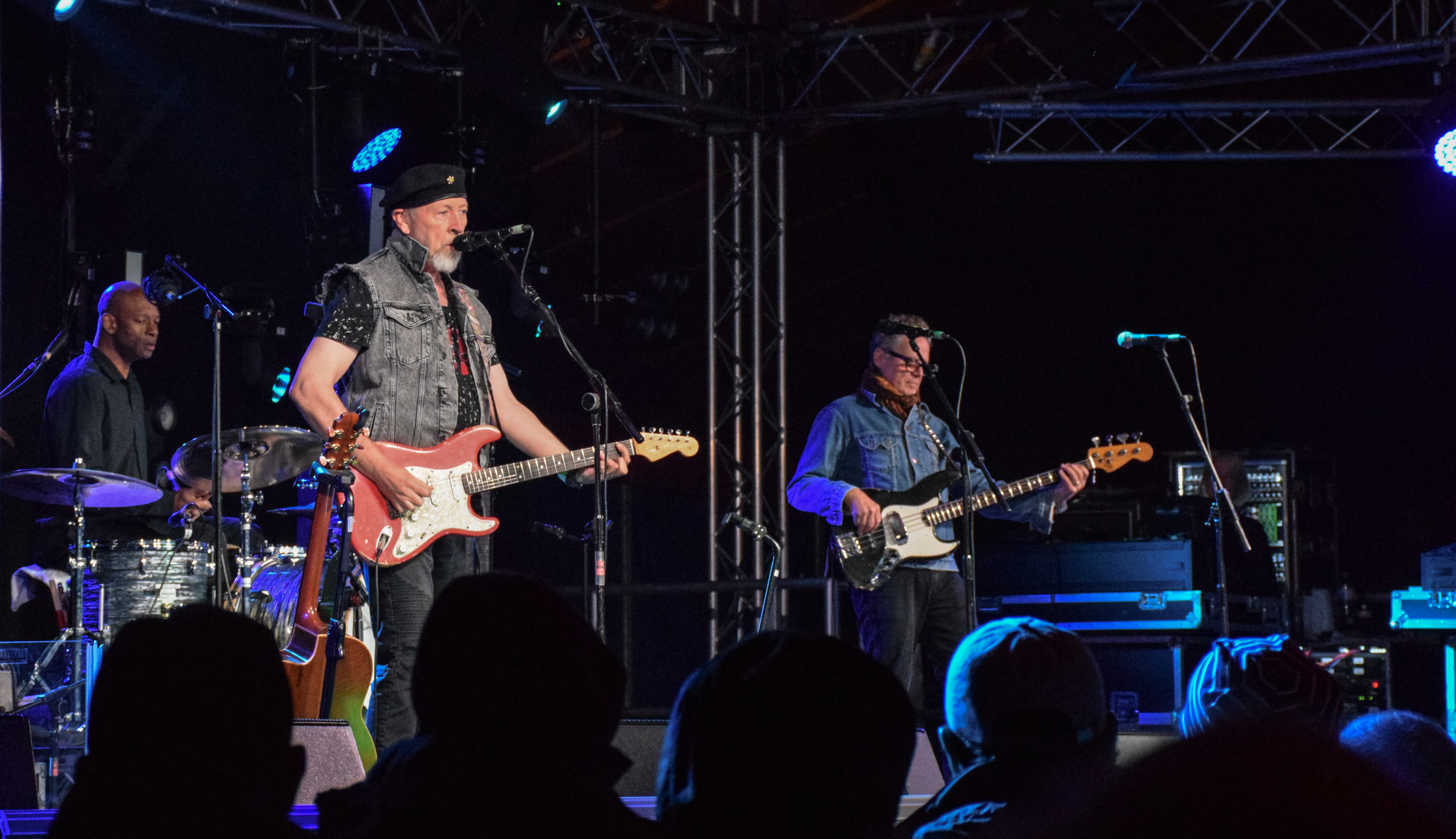
Jerome playing with the Richard Thompson Electric Trio at Towersey Festival, 2018

He has also toured with Richard Thompson and John Cale. He recorded four albums with Cale – blackAcetate (2005), Circus Live (2007), Extra Playful (2011) and Shifty Adventures in Nookie Wood (2012).

Michael Jerome is co-founder of the trio Halls Of The Machine. Mike Graff (guitars) and Van Eric Martin (piano) are the fellow musicians. Their first album is titled "Atmospheres For Lovers And Sleepers" and was released in 2001. Their second album, Calling All Tribal Dignitaries, will be released in 2017.

In 2015 the song "Bono X" of Halls Of The Machine was officially released worldwide on the Compilation "I.C. - Independent Celebration, Vol. 1" from the German label "Birdstone Records".

Michael has also been providing percussion work with Dave Alvin’s The Third Mind project.

Jerome is a Pittsburgh Steelers fan and resides in Los Angeles, California.

== Discography ==
With Pop Poppins

- The Other Lover (1990)
- Delight in Disorder (1991)
- Live at the Hop (1992)
- Epitome of Simplicity (1992)
- Pop Poppins (1993)
- Non-Pop Specific (1996)

With Toadies

- "Dig a Hole" / "I Hope You Die" (1991)

With Course of Empire

- Initiation (1994)
- Telepathic Last Words (1998)

With The Blind Boys of Alabama

- Spirit of the Century (2001)
- Go Tell It on the Mountain (2003)
- Atom Bomb (2005)

With Charlie Musselwhite

- One Night in America (2001)
- Sanctuary (2004)

With Richard Thompson

- Semi-Detached Mock Tudor (2002)
- 1000 Years of Popular Music (2003)
- The Old Kit Bag (2003)
- Sweet Warrior (2007)
- Live Warrior (2009)
- Dream Attic (2010)
- Electric (2013)
- Still (2015)
- 13 Rivers (2018)
- Ship To Shore (2024)
- Hippies, Thugs and Heroes (2026)

With Pleasure Club

- Here Comes the Trick (2002)
- The Fugitive Kind (2004)

With John Cale

- blackAcetate (2005)
- Circus Live (2007)
- Extra Playful (2011)
- Shifty Adventures in Nookie Wood (2012)

With Taj Mahal

- Maestro (2008)

With Robin Danar

- Altered States (2008)

With Meiko

- Meiko (2008)

With Sara Lov

- The Young Eyes (2008)
- Seasoned Eyes Were Beaming (2009)

With Bill Purdy

- Move My Way (2008)

With Keaton Simons

- Can You Hear Me (2008)

With Brandi Shearer

- Love Don't Make You Juliet (2009)

With Po' Girl

- Deer in the Night (2009)

With Better Than Ezra

- Paper Empire (2009)
- All Together Now (2014)

With Tom Freund

- Fit to Screen (2009)

With Ana Egge

- Road to My Love (2009)

With k.d. lang

- Recollection (2010)

With Nina Ferraro

- The Promise (2010)

With Alyssa Graham

- The Lock, Stock, and Soul (2011)

With Ben Ottewell

- Shapes & Shadows (2011)

With Steve Forbert

- Over with You (2012)

With Holmes

- Complication Simplified (2012)

With Shelby Lynne

- Thanks (2013)
- I Can't Imagine (2015)

With Wavves

- Afraid of Heights (2013)

With The Third Mind

- The Third Mind (2020)
- The Third Mind/2 (2024)

With Slash

- Orgy of the Damned (2024)

=== Compilation appearances ===
- I. C. Independent Celebration, Vol. 1 (2015, Birdstone Records) (with Halls Of The Machine: song: "Bono X" (full version on CD; edited version on vinyl)
