= Charlie Musselwhite =

American blues musician (born 1944)

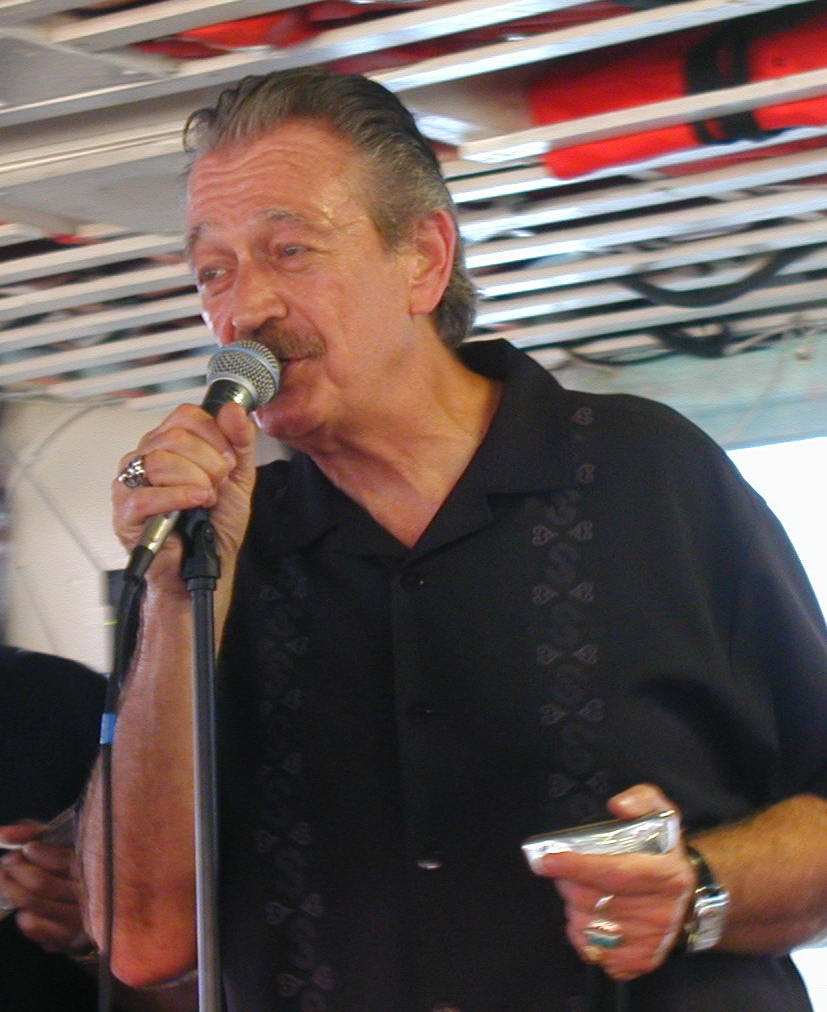
- Musselwhite performing on the New York City Blues Cruise, 2003

Background information
- Also known as: Memphis Charlie
- Born: Charles Douglas Musselwhite; January 31, 1944 (age 82); Kosciusko, Mississippi, U.S.
- Origin: Memphis, Tennessee, U.S.
- Genre: Blues
- Occupations: Musician; songwriter
- Instruments: Harmonica; guitar; vocals
- Years active: 1966–present
- Labels: Vanguard; Arhoolie; Capitol; Crystal Clear; Kicking Mule; Blue Rock'It; Alligator; Pointblank; Real World; Narada; Blind Pig
- Website: charliemusselwhite.com

Charles Douglas Musselwhite (born January 31, 1944) is an American blues harmonica player and bandleader who came to prominence, along with Mike Bloomfield, Paul Butterfield, Harvey Mandel and Elvin Bishop, as a pivotal figure in helping to revive the Chicago Blues movement of the 1960s. He has often been identified as a "white bluesman".

Musselwhite was reportedly the inspiration for Elwood Blues, the character played by Dan Aykroyd in the 1980 film, The Blues Brothers.

== Biography ==
Musselwhite, whose father and paternal grandfather were also named Charlie Musselwhite (making him Charlie Musselwhite III), was born in Kosciusko, Mississippi to white parents. Originally claiming to be of partly Choctaw descent, in a 2005 interview he said his mother had told him he was of distant Cherokee descent. His family considered it natural to play music. His father played guitar and harmonica, his mother played piano, and another relative was a one-man band.

At the age of three, Musselwhite moved to Memphis, Tennessee. When he was a teenager, Memphis experienced the period when rockabilly, western swing, and electric blues were combining to give birth to rock and roll. That period featured Elvis Presley, Jerry Lee Lewis, Johnny Cash, and lesser-known musicians such as Gus Cannon, Furry Lewis, Will Shade, and Johnny Burnette. Musselwhite supported himself by digging ditches, laying concrete, and running moonshine in a 1950 Lincoln automobile. This environment was a school for music as well as life for Musselwhite, who eventually acquired the nickname Memphis Charlie.

Musselwhite then took off in search of the rumored "big-paying factory jobs" up the "Hillbilly Highway", Highway 51 to Chicago, where he continued his education on the South Side, making the acquaintance of blues musicians Lew Soloff, Muddy Waters, Junior Wells, Sonny Boy Williamson, Buddy Guy, Howlin' Wolf, Little Walter, and Big Walter Horton. Musselwhite immersed himself completely in the musical life, living in the basement of and occasionally working at Jazz Record Mart (the record store operated by Delmark Records founder Bob Koester) with Big Joe Williams and working as a driver for an exterminator, which allowed him to observe what was happening around the city's clubs and bars. He spent his time hanging out at the Jazz Record Mart, at the corner of State and Grand, and a nearby bar, Mr. Joe's, with the city's blues musicians, and sitting in with Williams and others in the clubs, playing for tips. There he forged a lifelong friendship with John Lee Hooker. Though Hooker lived in Detroit, Michigan, the two often visited each other, and Hooker served as best man at Musselwhite's third marriage to Henrietta Musselwhite. Gradually, Musselwhite became well known around town.

In 1965, when working at the Jazz Record Mart, Charlie met Vanguard Records producer/writer Sam Charters, who included him in the blockbuster blues trilogy, Chicago/The Blues/Today! (Volume 3 / VRS 9218), in which he played with blues harp legend Big Walter Horton's Blues Harp Band. At this time Charters signed him to another contract which led to Musselwhite's first solo outing in 1966, Stand Back! Here Comes Charley Musselwhite's South Side Band (VSD 79232).

Musslewhite played all harmonica on the 1965 Vanguard Records album So Many Roads by John Hammond.

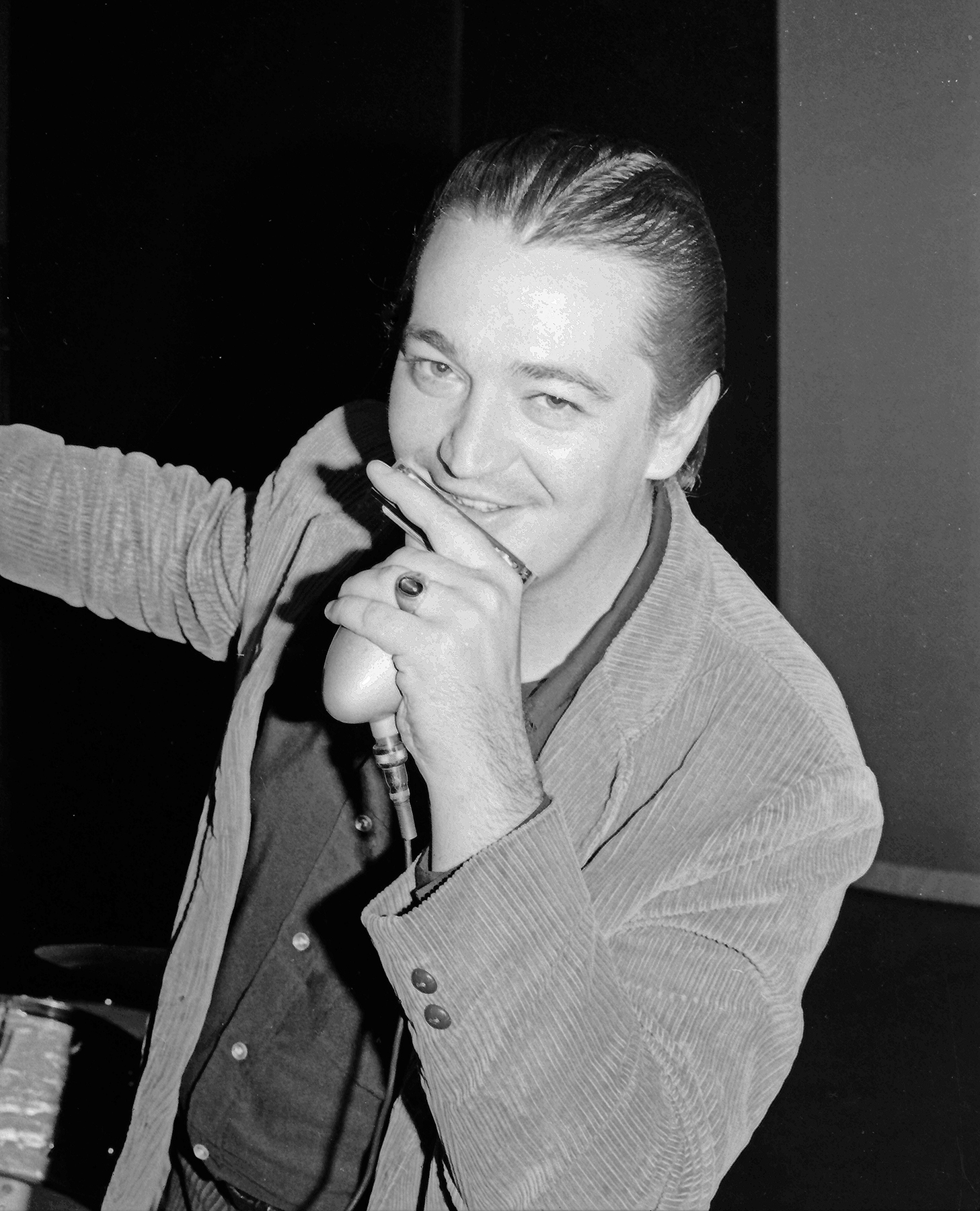
Memphis Charlie Musselwhite after a concert in Minneapolis, Minnesota, 1971

In time, Musselwhite led his own blues band, and after Elektra Records' success with Paul Butterfield, he released the album Stand Back! Here Comes Charley Musselwhite's Southside Band in 1966 on Vanguard Records to immediate success. He took advantage of the clout this album gave him to move to San Francisco, where, instead of being one of many competing blues acts, he held court as the king of the blues in the exploding countercultural music scene, an exotic and gritty figure to the flower children. Musselwhite convinced Hooker to move to California.

Since then, Musselwhite has released over 20 albums and has been a guest performer on albums by many other musicians, such as Bonnie Raitt's Longing in Their Hearts and the Blind Boys of Alabama's Spirit of the Century, both winners of Grammy Awards. He also performed on Tom Waits's Mule Variations and INXS's Suicide Blonde. He has won 14 Blues Music Awards, has been nominated for six Grammy Awards, received Lifetime Achievement Awards from the Monterey Blues Festival and the San Javier Jazz Festival, in San Javier, Spain, and received the Mississippi Governor's Award for Excellence in the Arts.

In 1979, Musselwhite recorded The Harmonica According to Charlie Musselwhite in London for Kicking Mule Records, intended to accompany an instructional book; the album became so popular that it was released on CD. In June 2008, Blind Pig Records reissued the album on 180-gram vinyl with new cover art.

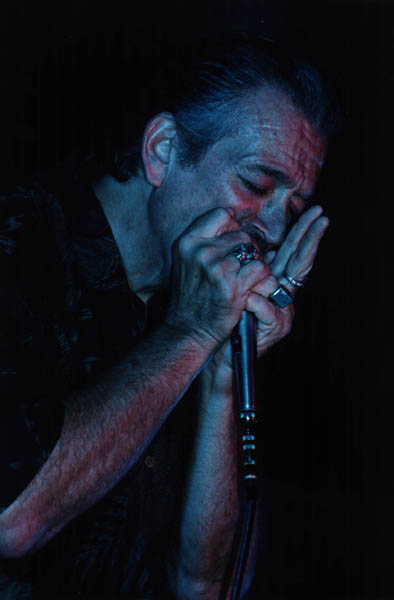
Musselwhite at the Liri Blues Festival, Italy, in 2000

In 1990 Musselwhite signed with Alligator Records, a step that led to a resurgence of his career.

In 1998, Musselwhite appeared in the film Blues Brothers 2000. He played the harmonica in the Louisiana Gator Boys, which featured many other blues and R&B musicians, such as B.B. King, Bo Diddley, Eric Clapton, Koko Taylor, Jimmie Vaughan, Dr. John, and Jack DeJohnette.

Over the years, Musselwhite has branched out in style. His 1999 recording, Continental Drifter, is accompanied by Cuarteto Patria, from Cuba's Santiago region, the Cuban music counterpart of the Mississippi Delta. Because of political differences between Cuba and the United States, the album was recorded in Bergen, Norway, with Musselwhite's wife handling the details.

Musselwhite believes the key to his musical success was finding a style in which he could express himself. He said, "I only know one tune, and I play it faster or slower, or I change the key, but it's just the one tune I've ever played in my life. It's all I know."

His two albums, Sanctuary and Delta Hardware, were released by Real World Records.

Musselwhite played on Tom Waits' 1999 album Mule Variations. He can be heard at the beginning of the song "Chocolate Jesus" saying "I love it". Waits has mentioned that this is his favorite part of the song.

In 2002, he was featured on the Bo Diddley tribute album Hey Bo Diddley: A Tribute!, performing the song "Hey Bo Diddley".

Musselwhite lost both of his parents in December 2005, in separate incidents. His mother, Ruth Maxine Musselwhite, was murdered.

Musselwhite joined the judging panel of the 10th annual Independent Music Awards, to assist independent musicians' careers. He was also a judge for the 7th and 9th Independent Music Awards.

Musselwhite was inducted into the Blues Hall of Fame in 2010. The same year, he appeared on the JW-Jones recording "Midnight Memphis Sun", along with Hubert Sumlin. Also in 2010, he released the album The Well. In the title song he credits Jessica McClure's ordeal as a child trapped in a well for over 58 hours in 1987 for inspiring him to quit drinking, stating,

She was trapped in there with a broken arm in the dark, in a life-and-death situation she was singing nursery rhymes to herself and being brave... It made my problems seem tiny. So as a prayer to her and myself, I decided I wasn't going to drink till she got out of that well. It was like I was tricking myself, telling myself that I wasn't going to quit for good, just until she got out. It took three days to get her out, and I haven't had a drink since.

For the first half of 2011, Musselwhite toured with the acoustic-electric blues band Hot Tuna. In the latter half of 2011, he went on tour with Cyndi Lauper, having played harmonica on her hit album Memphis Blues. While on this tour, he appeared with Lauper on Jools Holland's television program Hootenanny on New Year's Eve 2011, performing a modified arrangement of Lauper's signature song, "Girls Just Wanna Have Fun".

In 2012, Musselewhite released the live album Juke Joint Chapel (recorded at the Shack Up Inn in Clarksdale, Mississippi) which was nominated for a Grammy for Best Traditional Blues Album. Musselwhite also teamed with Ben Harper to record the album Get Up!, which was released in January 2013. In January 2014, it won a Grammy Award for Best Blues Album.

In 2014 and 2015, he won a Blues Music Award in the category Best Instrumentalist – Harmonicist. At the 40th Blues Music Awards ceremony in 2019, Musselwhite's joint composition with Ben Harper, "No Mercy In This Land", was named as 'Song of the Year'. In 2023, Musselwhite won another Blues Music Award with the 'Acoustic Album of the Year' title for his LP, Mississippi Son.

Musselwhite portrays Alvin Reynolds in the 2023 Martin Scorsese film Killers of the Flower Moon.

== Discography ==
- 1967 Stand Back! Here Comes Charley Musselwhite's Southside Band (Vanguard)
- 1968 Stone Blues (Vanguard)
- 1968 Louisiana Fog (Cherry Red/Kent Music)
- 1969 Tennessee Woman (Vanguard)
- 1970 Memphis, Tennessee (Paramount-ABC/MCA)
- 1970 Coming Home: Chicago Blue Stars (Blue Thumb)
- 1971 Takin' My Time (Arhoolie)
- 1974 Goin' Back Down South (Arhoolie)
- 1975 Leave The Blues To Us (Capitol)
- 1977 The Cream with John Lee Hooker (Tomato)
- 1978 Times Gettin' Tougher Than Tough (Crystal Clear)
- 1979 The Harmonica According To Charlie Musselwhite (Kicking Mule; later issued on Blind Pig)
- 1982 Curtain Call: Charlie Musselwhite & The Dynatones 'Live' (War Bride-Solid Smoke; later issued on Westside)
- 1984 Where Have All the Good Times Gone? (Blue Rock'it)
- 1986 Mellow-Dee (CrossCut)
- 1988 Cambridge Blues (Blue Horizon)
- 1989 Memphis Charlie (Arhoolie) - compilation
- 1990 Ace Of Harps (Alligator)
- 1991 Signature (Alligator)
- 1993 In My Time (Alligator)
- 1994 The Blues Never Die (Vanguard) - compilation
- 1997 Rough News (Pointblank-Virgin/EMI)
- 1999 Continental Drifter (Pointblank-Virgin/EMI)
- 1999 Superharps (with James Cotton, Billy Branch, Sugar Ray Norcia) (Telarc)
- 1999 Harpin' on a Riff: The Best of Charlie Musselwhite (Music Collection [UK]) - compilation
- 2000 Best of the Vanguard Years (Vanguard) - compilation
- 2000 Up and Down the Highway: Live 1986 (Indigo; reissue of Cambridge Blues)
- 2002 One Night in America (Telarc)
- 2003 Darkest Hour: The Solo Recordings of Charlie Musselwhite (Henrietta Records)
- 2004 Sanctuary (Real World-Narada/EMI)
- 2005 Deluxe Edition (Alligator) - compilation
- 2006 Delta Hardware (Real World-Narada/EMI)
- 2007 Black Snake Moan (Music from the Motion Picture) (New West)
- 2008 Rough Dried: Live at the Triple Door (Henrietta)
- 2010 The Well (Alligator)
- 2012 Juke Joint Chapel [live] (Henrietta)
- 2013 Get Up! (with Ben Harper) (Stax-Concord/UMe)
- 2013 Remembering Little Walter (with various artists) (Blind Pig)
- 2015 I Ain't Lyin'... [live] (Henrietta)
- 2018 No Mercy in This Land (with Ben Harper) (ANTI/Epitaph)
- 2020 100 Years of Blues (with Elvin Bishop) (Alligator)
- 2022 Mississippi Son (Alligator)
- 2025 Look Out Highway (Forty Below)
- 2026 Blues Now (with GA-20) (New West)
