= King of New Orleans =

1996 single by Better Than Ezra

Single by Better Than Ezra

from the album Friction, Baby
- Released: July 22, 1996
- Length: 4:07
- Label: Elektra
- Songwriter: Kevin Griffin
- Producer: Don Gehman

Better Than Ezra singles chronology
"Rosealia" (1995)	"King of New Orleans" (1996)	"Desperately Wanting" (1996)

"King of New Orleans" is the lead single from American rock band Better Than Ezra's third studio album, Friction, Baby (1996). The song was serviced to U.S. alternative radio in July 1996 and entered the top 10 on the Billboard Mainstream Rock Tracks and Modern Rock Tracks charts.

== Commercial performance ==
"King of New Orleans" spent 17 weeks on the U.S. Billboard Modern Rock Tracks chart, peaking at No. 5. The single also reached No. 62 on the Billboard Hot 100 Airplay chart.

== Charts ==
Chart (1996)	Peak position
Australia (ARIA)	158
Canada Rock/Alternative (RPM)	3
U.S. Hot 100 Airplay (Billboard)	62
U.S. Mainstream Rock Tracks (Billboard)	7
U.S. Modern Rock Tracks (Billboard)	5

== Release history ==
Region	Date	Format(s)	Label(s)	Ref.
United States	July 22, 1996	Alternative radio	Elektra	
United States	September 10, 1996	Contemporary hit radio	Elektra	
