= Sanctuary (Charlie Musselwhite album) =

Studio album by Charlie Musselwhite
- Released: April 6, 2004
- Genre: Delta blues, Electric blues
- Length: 46:10
- Label: Real World Records
- Producer: John Chelew

Charlie Musselwhite chronology
Up And Down The Highway: Live 1986 (2003)	Sanctuary (2004)	Delta Hardware (2006)

Professional ratings
Review scores
Source	Rating
AllMusic	4/5 stars
The Penguin Guide to Blues Recordings	3.5/4 stars

Sanctuary is the twenty third studio album by American singer and harpist Charlie Musselwhite. It was released in 2004 on Peter Gabriel's Real World label, Musselwhite's debut release on this label.

The album features two other American artists who have released on Real World: all male vocal gospel group Blind Boys of Alabama, and folk blues guitarist Ben Harper.

== Track listing ==
All tracks composed by Charlie Musselwhite; except where indicated

1. "Homeless Child" (Ben Harper) – 2:59
2. "My Road Lies in Darkness" – 4:41
3. "Burn Down the Cornfield" (Randy Newman) – 3:29
4. "Train to Nowhere" (Chris Youlden, Kim Simmonds) – 5:13
5. "Shootin' for the Moon" (Sonny Landreth) – 3:15
6. "Shadow People" (Musselwhite, Charlie Sexton, Jared Nickerson, Michael Jerome) – 3:44
7. "Snake Song" (Townes Van Zandt) – 3:49
8. "The Neighborhood" (Charlie Sexton) – 5:58
9. "Alicia" (Eddie Harris) – 4:05
10. "Sanctuary" (Bob Telson, Lee Breuer) – 3:29
11. "I Had Trouble" – 4:12
12. "Route 19 (Attala County, Mississippi)" – 1:10

== Personnel ==
- Charlie Musselwhite – lead vocals, harmonica, electric guitar
- Charlie Sexton – guitar, backing vocals
- Jared Michael Nickerson – bass guitar
- Michael Jerome – drums
- Ben Harper – guitar, backing vocals on "Homeless Child" and "Sanctuary"
- Blind Boys of Alabama – backing vocals on "Train to Nowhere" and "I Had Trouble"
