= In the Blood (Better Than Ezra song) =

Single by Better Than Ezra

from the album Deluxe
- Released: June 1995
- Recorded: 1993
- Genre: Alternative rock
- Length: 4:32
- Label: Elektra
- Songwriter: Kevin Griffin
- Producer: Dan Rothchild

Better Than Ezra singles chronology
| "Good" (1995) | "In the Blood" (1995) | "Rosealia" (1995) |

"In the Blood" is a song by American alternative rock group Better Than Ezra. It was released in June 1995 as the second single from the band's major-label debut album Deluxe. The song peaked at number four on the Billboard Modern Rock Tracks chart and number six on the Mainstream Rock Tracks chart. The song was not eligible to chart on the Hot 100 because no commercial single was made available for purchase. However, the song received enough radio airplay to peak at number 48 on the Hot 100 Airplay chart.

In an interview with Brian Ives (October 4, 2021), frontman Kevin Griffin stated: "But the lyrics… I usually don’t tell people where my head was, but my girlfriend at the time, her uncle had had AIDS and he was in the last stage of battling AIDS. He passed away in ’96. It was really about AIDS and it was literally about: what’s in your blood? Do you really know the person you’re with and who did they love before you and who did they love before them? And it was really just a very literal lyric to me. It was really about her uncle Patrick, who was an amazing guy. He was an editor for The Advocate. He lived in West Hollywood and he was still somewhat healthy. But dealing with it was a tough time. But that’s what the lyrics are about. So it really wasn’t about a relationship. It was really about this man. I rarely told people about that because it’s kind of heavy."

== Music video ==
The music video for the song was directed by Frank W. Ockenfels III. As with "Good", the band's previous single, "In the Blood" saw radio success before the video aired on MTV.

== Track listing ==
1. "In the Blood" (Edit Remix)
2. "In the Blood" (LP Version Remix)

Note: Promotional CD.

== Chart performance ==
| Chart (1995) | Peak position |
|---|---|
| Canada Top Singles (RPM) | 66 |
| Canada Alternative 30 (RPM) | 3 |
| U.S. Billboard Modern Rock Tracks | 4 |
| U.S. Billboard Album Rock Tracks | 6 |
| U.S. Billboard Hot 100 Airplay | 48 |
