= Rosealia =

1995 single by Better Than Ezra

Single by Better Than Ezra

from the album Deluxe
- Released: October 24, 1995
- Length: 4:36
- Label: Elektra
- Songwriter: Kevin Griffin
- Producer: Dan Rothchild

Better Than Ezra singles chronology
"In the Blood" (1995)	"Rosealia" (1995)	"King of New Orleans" (1996)

"Rosealia" is a song by American alternative rock group Better Than Ezra. It was released in October 1995 as the third single from their debut album, Deluxe (1993).

== Reception ==
"Rosealia" peaked at No. 71 on the US Billboard Hot 100. It also spent 11 weeks on the Billboard Modern Rock Tracks chart, peaking at No. 24.

== Charts ==
Chart (1995–1996)	Peak position
Canada Top Singles (RPM)	69
US Billboard Hot 100	71
US Modern Rock Tracks (Billboard)	24
US Top 40/Mainstream (Billboard)	39
US Cash Box Top 100	70
