= Desperately Wanting =

1996 single by Better Than Ezra

Single by Better Than Ezra

from the album Friction, Baby
- Released: November 26, 1996
- Length: 4:37
- Label: Elektra
- Songwriter: Kevin Griffin
- Producer: Don Gehman

Better Than Ezra singles chronology
"King of New Orleans" (1996)	"Desperately Wanting" (1996)	"Long Lost" (1997)

"Desperately Wanting" is a song by American alternative rock group Better Than Ezra. It was released in November 1996 as the second single from their third studio album, Friction, Baby, and became a chart hit in the United States, Australia, and Canada.

== Composition ==
In an interview with SongFacts.com, Better Than Ezra frontman Kevin Griffin, who wrote this song, explained: "'Desperately Wanting' is a song where someone is looking back on their childhood. Specifically that song is about when I used to camp out with my friends in the summer down in the South, and you'd stay up all night causing havoc, throwing rocks at passing cars, knocking over mailboxes and vandalizing, as red-blooded men are want to do. And literally, you're running all through the neighborhood and through the yards, and there's the dew on the grass. It was about those nights spent with a friend running around, running through the wet grass. And then it's a story of two people who took divergent paths in life. One person made a lot of bad decisions and ended up having some mental issues. And then just how you lose touch with people. And how when you're young and you're running around all night, and life hasn't had its way with you, the playing field is equal and it's flat. And then life takes everybody on their own journeys. But there's a time where all your potential is untapped and the world hasn't had its way with you. That's an amazing time of promise, and that's what 'Desperately Wanting' is about."

== Music video ==
The video for "Desperately Wanting" was filmed at Los Angeles International Airport.

== Track listings ==
US CD and cassette single

1. "Desperately Wanting" – 4:37
2. "Palace Hotel" – 3:44

European CD single

1. "Desperately Wanting" (radio edit) – 4:01
2. "Palace Hotel" – 3:44
3. "In the Blood" (LP version) – 4:32

== Chart performance ==
"Desperately Wanting" reached No. 48 on the US Billboard Hot 100, peaking on February 8, 1997. The song was most successful on the Billboard Mainstream Rock Tracks chart, where it peaked at No. 10. In Canada the single reached No. 13 on both the RPM 100 Hit Tracks and Alternative 30 charts. It also made a brief appearance on the Australian Singles Chart, peaking at No. 83.

=== Weekly charts ===
Chart (1996–1997)	Peak position
Australia (ARIA)	83
Canada Top Singles (RPM)	13
Canada Rock/Alternative (RPM)	13
US Billboard Hot 100	48
US Adult Top 40 (Billboard)	37
US Mainstream Rock Tracks (Billboard)	10
US Modern Rock Tracks (Billboard)	11
US Top 40/Mainstream (Billboard)	33
US Triple-A (Billboard)	15

=== Year-end charts ===
Chart (1997)	Position
US Mainstream Rock Tracks (Billboard)	29
US Modern Rock Tracks (Billboard)	29
