= Juicy (Better Than Ezra song) =

Single by Better Than Ezra

from the album Before the Robots
- Released: 2005 (U.S.)
- Recorded: 2005
- Genre: Alternative rock
- Length: 3:53
- Label: Artemis Records
- Songwriter(s): Kevin Griffin

Better Than Ezra singles chronology
"A Lifetime" (2005)	"Juicy" (2005)	"Absolutely Still" (2009)

"Juicy" is a song by American alternative rock group Better Than Ezra. It was released in 2006 as the third single from their album Before the Robots. The song was the follow-up single to 2005's "A Lifetime", which was the band's highest-charting single in four years. It was not as successful, but would reach #13 on the Billboard Adult Top 40 chart.

The song was featured in an episode of America's Funniest Home Videos, in a promotion for Desperate Housewives, and in a Chili's commercial, advertising tasty steaks.

== Chart performance ==
Chart (2006)	Peak position
U.S. Billboard Adult Top 40	19
