= A Lifetime =

Single by Better Than Ezra

from the album Closer and Before the Robots
- Released: 2005
- Genre: Alternative rock
- Length: 3:30
- Label: Artemis Records
- Songwriter: Kevin Griffin

Better Than Ezra singles chronology
"Extra Ordinary" (2001)	"A Lifetime" (2005)	"Our Last Night" (2005)

"A Lifetime" is a song by the American alternative rock band Better Than Ezra. It was originally released on the band's 2001 album Closer. However, a new, re-recorded version (which would become the single) appeared on their 2005 album Before the Robots.

== Content ==
On the surface, the song is about how a group of friends remember a close friend who has just died. However, in an article that appears on the VH1 website, lead singer Kevin Griffin says that the song is inspired by a story about the death of Gram Parsons: "Gram's tale is just a great, romantic rock'n'roll story. His friend stole his funeral casket from LAX and took it down to 29 Palms and set him on fire as the sun came up ... and that's where I got the story of some friends stealing their friend's urn, and honoring the girl's true wishes, and going out to the beach one morning and listening to this R.E.M. song they used to listen to growing up as the sun was coming up. It was a way to make something both personal and dramatic." During an interview for the online mini-documentary "A Brief History of Better Than Ezra," Griffin reveals the R.E.M. song to be "Perfect Circle".

Although "A Lifetime" was released as the first single from Before the Robots, it would prove to be the highest-charting song from the album. It reached number eleven on the Billboard Adult Top 40 chart. It was the band's highest-charting single since "Extra Ordinary" in 2001.

== Chart performance ==
Chart (2005)	Peak position
U.S. Billboard Adult Top 40	13

== Release history ==
Release dates and formats for "A Lifetime"
Region	Date	Format	Label(s)	Ref.
United States	July 5, 2005	Mainstream airplay	Artemis	
