= The Well (Charlie Musselwhite album) =

Studio album by Charlie Musselwhite
- Released: August 24, 2010
- Genre: Blues, blues rock
- Length: 47:36
- Label: Alligator
- Producer: Chris Goldsmith

Charlie Musselwhite chronology
Rough Dried - Live at The Triple Door (2008)	The Well (2010)	Juke Joint Chapel (2012)

Professional ratings
Review scores
Source	Rating
Allmusic	4/5 stars
DownBeat	4/5 stars

The Well is the twenty-seventh studio album by American blues singer and harmonica player Charlie Musselwhite. It was released in August 2010. It was his first release on the Alligator Records label since his 1993 album In My Time. In the title song, he credits Jessica McClure's ordeal as a child trapped in a well for over 58 hours in 1987 for inspiring him to quit drinking, stating,

She was trapped in there with a broken arm in the dark, in a life-and-death situation. She was singing nursery rhymes to herself and being brave. It made my problems seem tiny. So as a prayer to her and myself, I decided I wasn't going to drink till she got out of that well. It was like I was tricking myself, telling myself that I wasn't going to quit for good, just until she got out. It took three days to get her out, and I haven't had a drink since.

== Reception ==
Frank-John Hadley gave the album 4 stars in his review for DownBeat. He wrote, "Musslewhite gives it to us straight on the crown jewel in a discography dating back to the late-’60s. There’s an oldfangled inspiration pushing his excellent harmonica work and his relaxed, comfy-as-an-old-coat singing".

Thom Jurek assigned 4 stars to the release in AllMusic. He commented,"His own harmonica playing and vocals are everywhere and top-notch. The most compelling thing about The Well is its lack of pretension; Musselwhite has risen to the task of recording a completely autobiographical album that refuses easy clichés, or resting on laurels; its energy is infectious . . . The Well is different from any recording Musselwhite's done before, but it also represents him and his experience of the blues in a singular and profound way. It's damn near perfect".

== Track listing ==
1. "Rambler's Blues" – 3:45
2. "Dig the Pain" – 2:23
3. "The Well" – 3:18
4. "Where Hwy 61 Runs" – 4:24
5. "Sad and Beautiful World" – 3:39
6. "Sonny Payne Special" – 2:22
7. "Good Times" – 3:28
8. "Just You, Just Blues" – 3:59
9. "Cadillac Women" – 4:08
10. "Hoodoo Queen" – 4:09
11. "Clarksdale Getaway" – 4:13
12. "Cook County Blues" – 3:38
13. "Sorcerer's Dream" – 4:10

== Personnel ==
- Charlie Musselwhite – vocals, harmonica
- John Bazz – bass
- Dave Gonzales – guitar, vocals
- Stephen Hodges – drums, percussion
- Mavis Staples – vocals
