= Soap on a rope =

Bar of toilet soap molded around a rope

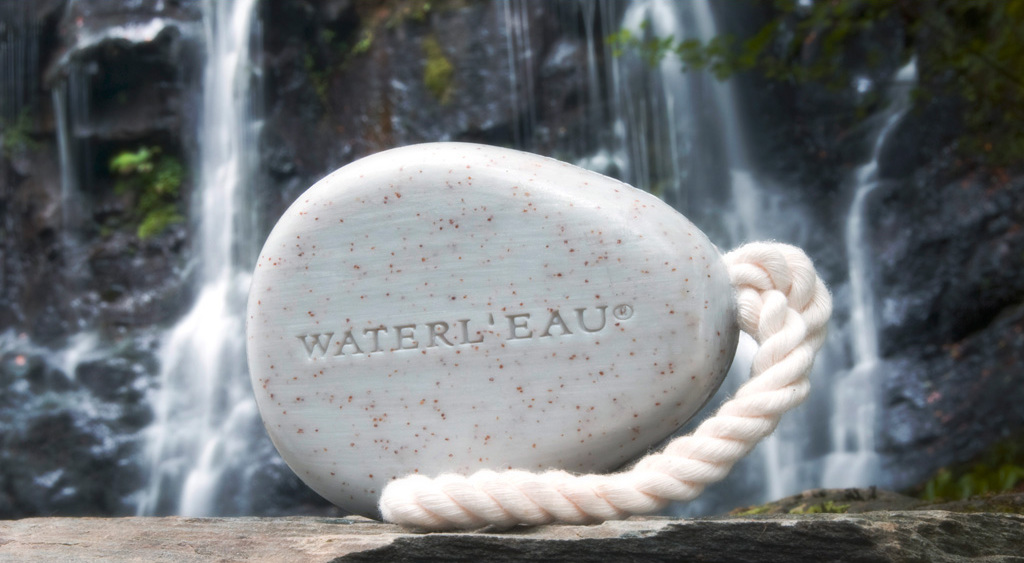
- Branded soap on a rope
- Type: Soap, cleaning agent
- Available: Yes

Soap on a rope is a bar of toilet soap that is molded around a small loop of rope. The user is meant to place the rope loop over their wrist.

The notion of soap on a rope as a seasonal gift, particularly for men, was popular in the United Kingdom in the 1970s, and it remained an ironic or niche marketing tool through the 1990s. 'Pope on a rope' soaps, for example, were sold during papal visits to the UK and the United States.
