= Absolutely Still =

Single by Better Than Ezra

from the album Paper Empire
- Released: 2009 (U.S.)
- Genre: Alternative rock
- Length: 3:58
- Label: Megaforce Records
- Songwriter(s): Kevin Griffin, Val Emmich
- Producer(s): Kevin Griffin; Warren Huart

Better Than Ezra singles chronology
"Juicy" (2006)	"Absolutely Still" (2009)	"Just One Day" (2009)

"Absolutely Still" is the first single from Better Than Ezra's seventh studio album, Paper Empire, released in 2009. The song was produced by Warren Huart and Better Than Ezra's lead vocalist, Kevin Griffin.

The song was co-written in 2005 by Better Than Ezra lead singer, Kevin Griffin, and singer/songwriter Val Emmich, who released it on his own album, Sunlight Searchparty. Better Than Ezra later recorded their own version of the song and released it as their first single from their 2009 album, Paper Empire.
