= Good (Better Than Ezra song) =

1995 single by Better Than Ezra

Single by Better Than Ezra

from the album Deluxe
- B-side: "Circle of Friends" (live)
- Written: 1990 or 1991
- Released: February 1995
- Genre: Alternative rock; post-grunge
- Length: 3:05
- Label: Elektra
- Songwriter: Kevin Griffin
- Producer: Dan Rothchild

Better Than Ezra singles chronology
"Tremble" (1990)	"Good" (1995)	"In the Blood" (1995)

Music video
- "Good" on YouTube

"Good" is a song by American alternative rock band Better Than Ezra. It was released in February 1995 by Elektra as the lead single from their major-label debut album, Deluxe (1995). It reached No. 1 on the US Billboard Modern Rock Tracks chart, No. 3 on the Billboard Album Rock Tracks chart, and No. 30 on the Billboard Hot 100.

== Background ==
Kevin Griffin wrote the song in late 1990 or early 1991, just after he had graduated from LSU and had formed Better Than Ezra. It was a part of the band's set lists for several years before being released as a single in early 1995. His simple four-chord pattern and strong modulation were inspired by Bob Dylan's mastery of the three-chord structure, as well as alt-rock pioneers R.E.M. and the Pixies. "I wanted to talk about the positive things that come from the end of a relationship. There's always the hurt feelings and everyone's guarded and it can be traumatic, but when the dust settles, it was about looking at the good things - no pun intended - that you got from that relationship. How did you grow? What did you learn emotionally? And to experience some stuff. And in this case it was just kind of reflecting on how this person changed," said Griffin. He was in a happy relationship at the time, so the song wasn't personal experience, but he broke up shortly after.

== Track listings and formats ==
- US CD and cassette single
1. "Good" – 3:05
2. "Circle of Friends" (live version) – 3:39
- German maxi-CD single
1. "Good" – 3:05
2. "Summerhouse" (live version) – 2:23
3. "Know You Better" (live version) – 4:32
4. "Circle of Friends" (live version) – 3:39

== Charts ==
=== Weekly charts ===
Weekly chart performance for "Good"
Chart (1995)	Peak position
Australia (ARIA)	86
Canada Top Singles (RPM)	26
Canada Rock/Alternative (RPM)	4
UK Singles (Official Charts)	86
US Billboard Hot 100	30
US Album Rock Tracks (Billboard)	3
US Modern Rock Tracks (Billboard)	1
US Top 40/Mainstream (Billboard)	17
US Cash Box Top 100	22

=== Year-end charts ===
Year-end chart performance for "Good"
Chart (1995)	Position
Canada Rock/Alternative (RPM)	17
US Billboard Hot 100	85
US Album Rock Tracks (Billboard)	8
US Modern Rock Tracks (Billboard)	2

== Release history ==
Release dates and formats for "Good"
Region	Date	Format(s)	Label(s)	Ref.
United States	February 1995	—N/a	Elektra	
United States	May 2, 1995	Contemporary hit radio	Elektra	
United Kingdom	June 12, 1995	CD; cassette	Elektra	
