= All Together Now (Better Than Ezra album) =

Studio album by Better Than Ezra
- Released: September 9, 2014
- Recorded: The Hobby Shop (Highland Park, CA)
- Genres: Alternative rock, post-grunge
- Length: 39:09
- Label: The End
- Producer: Tony Hoffer

Better Than Ezra chronology
| Paper Empire (2009) | All Together Now (2014) | Super Magick (2024) |

Singles from All Together Now
- 1. "Crazy Lucky" Released: March 25, 2014; 2. "Gonna Get Better" Released: August 5, 2014

All Together Now is the eighth studio album by the New Orleans–based rock group Better Than Ezra, released on September 9, 2014. It is available on CD, vinyl and as a digital download. Produced and mixed by producer Tony Hoffer, the album marks the band's first release through The End Records.

== Background and recording ==
On February 10, 2014, it was announced that the band had signed with The End Records for the release of their eighth studio album.

The band entered producer Tony Hoffer's studio, The Hobby Shop in Highland Park, California, in the summer of 2013 to record the album. Singer/guitarist Kevin Griffin described the process with Hoffer to CBS News in June 2014:

"Tony's aesthetic is different than maybe ours—production-wise. He wants to have less elements do more. Our default when we produce...is like, 'We need more guitars!"...And Tony is like, 'No we're going to do one guitar and make it sound great and interesting."

In an interview with Pollstar published on March 26, 2014, bassist Tom Drummond explained the gap between the band's 2009 release Paper Empire and All Together Now:

"We decided that we were going to put this out on our own terms. Nobody was going to tell us we had to put one out right now and then we’d rush through a bunch of songs to put out. We didn’t want to do that. We wanted to make the album we wanted to make ... So we took our time with it, we hired the right producer and we’re very excited about it."

The band aimed for a sound that would please old fans and at the same time attract new ones. "We made an album that was poppier and more concise songwriting," says lead singer and songwriter Kevin Griffin. "We wanted to give our old fans something familiar, but we wanted to attract new fans."

== Promotion ==
In support of the album, the band toured the US during the summer and fall of 2014.

One week before its release, Billboard premiered the album in its entirety via online stream.

On September 21, 2014, the band's performance from Anaheim's House of Blues was streamed live through Yahoo! Music.

== Release ==
On June 3, 2014, it was announced that the album would be released on September 9, 2014.

On July 11, 2014, the artwork and track listing for the album were unveiled.

=== Singles ===
The lead single from All Together Now, titled "Crazy Lucky", was released on March 25, 2014. According to singer/guitarist Kevin Griffin, the song is about "the serendipitous nature of a relationship—just how it's happenstance, how we meet people and the significant events over the course of our lives are so random." The song peaked at No. 38 on the US Adult Top 40 chart.

On August 5, 2014, the second single from the album, "Gonna Get Better", was released.

=== Album ===
All Together Now was released on September 9, 2014, through The End Records.

== Critical reception ==
Professional ratings
Review scores
| Source | Rating |
|---|---|
| AllMusic | 3.5/5 stars |

All Together Now has received mostly positive feedback from music critics. Fred Thomas of AllMusic rated the album three and a half stars out of five, writing that it "finds (the band) at characteristic heights of wistful FM radio pop songwriting."

== Track listing ==
Standard edition
| No. | Title | Length |
|---|---|---|
| 1. | "Crazy Lucky" | 3:11 |
| 2. | "Gonna Get Better" | 3:06 |
| 3. | "Undeniable" | 3:25 |
| 4. | "Insane" | 3:03 |
| 5. | "Sunflowers" | 3:11 |
| 6. | "The Great Unknown" | 3:58 |
| 7. | "Before You" | 3:16 |
| 8. | "Dollar Sign" | 3:18 |
| 9. | "One Heart Beating" | 3:23 |
| 10. | "Diamond in My Pocket" | 2:40 |
| 11. | "I Fly Away" | 3:24 |
| 12. | "Shut Up and Dance" (Digital bonus track – available through iTunes, Amazon or Google Play) | 3:14 |
| Total length: | | 39:09 |

== Chart performance ==
=== Singles ===
Billboard Music Charts (North America)

| Song | Chart (2014) | Peak position |
|---|---|---|
| Crazy Lucky | US Adult Pop Airplay (Billboard) | 38 |

=== Album ===
| Chart (2014) | Peak position |
|---|---|
| US Billboard 200 | 43 |
| US Independent Albums (Billboard) | 9 |
| US Top Alternative Albums (Billboard) | 7 |
| US Top Rock Albums (Billboard) | 13 |

== Release history ==
| Region | Date | Format(s) | Label |
|---|---|---|---|
| United States | September 9, 2014 | CD; Digital download; Vinyl | The End |
