= How Does Your Garden Grow? =

Studio album by Better Than Ezra
- Released: August 25, 1998
- Recorded: January 19 – March 30, 1998
- Genres: Alternative rock, art rock
- Length: 58:25
- Label: Elektra
- Producer: Malcolm Burn

Better Than Ezra chronology
Friction, Baby (1996)	How Does Your Garden Grow? (1998)	Closer (2001)

Professional ratings
Review scores
Source	Rating
AllMusic	4/5 stars

How Does Your Garden Grow? is the fourth album by the American alternative rock trio Better Than Ezra, released in 1998 via Elektra Records. It was the band's second album with drummer Travis Aaron McNabb. The album marked a shift from the post-grunge sound of previous albums to a more eclectic art rock rapport with the inclusion of electronic textures.

The album peaked at No. 128 on the Billboard charts. The first single, "One More Murder", peaked at No. 32 on the Billboard Modern Rock charts, while the second single, "At the Stars", peaked at No. 17. The 1998 The X-Files film features the funk tinged "One More Murder" on its soundtrack album.

Following the release of How Does Your Garden Grow?, Elektra dropped the band.

In 2013, the album was re-released on DVD-Audio in 5.1 surround sound.

== Production ==
The album was produced by Malcolm Burn. It was recorded at the band's Fudge Studios, in New Orleans. The album cover is subtitled "A Series of Nocturnes".

== Critical reception ==
The Washington Post called the album "clever, consistent and deftly eclectic."

AllMusic wrote that "the new ambition in the music (even if it isn't adventurous) and the catchier, more emotional songwriting is enough to elevate How Does Your Garden Grow? to the status of Better Than Ezra's best album."

== Track listing ==
All tracks by Kevin Griffin

1. "Je ne m'en souviens pas" – 4:43
2. "One More Murder" – 4:39
3. "At the Stars" – 3:43
4. "Like It Like That" – 2:44
5. "Allison Foley" – 3:45
6. "Under You" – 4:56
7. "Live Again" – 4:24
8. "Happy Day Mama" – 3:22
9. "Pull" – 2:58
10. "Particle" – 6:04
11. "Beautiful Mistake" – 4:35
12. "Everything in 2's" – 3:47
13. "New Kind of Low: Low / Coma" – 5:17
14. "Waxing or Waning?" – 3:21

== Personnel ==
- Kevin Griffin – Guitar, Vocals, Rhodes, Piano, Chamberlin, VCS3
- Tom Drummond – Bass, Pedal Steel, MetaSynth, VCS3
- Travis Aaron McNabb – Drums, Percussion, Beat Box, VCS3, Optigan

=== Additional personnel ===
- Anthony Dagradi – Flute
- Mark Mullins – Trombone
- Brian Graber – Trumpet
- James Arthur Payne – Guitar, Vocals
- Karl Berger – Vibraphone
