= Travis McNabb =

American drummer

- Born: Travis Aaron McNabb; November 19, 1969 (age 56); New Orleans, Louisiana, U.S.
- Genres: Alternative rock, country
- Occupations: Drummer, percussionist
- Instrument: Drums
- Years active: 1988–present
- Labels: Swell; Elektra; Ezra Dry Goods; Artemis; Beyond; Universal Music Nashville
- Website: www.travismcnabb.com

Travis Aaron McNabb (born November 18, 1969) is an American drummer and percussionist. He is perhaps best known as a longtime member of the band Better Than Ezra, although he has performed session and touring work with many acts during his career. Prior to joining Better Than Ezra in January 1996, McNabb toured with acts such as Vigilantes of Love, Beggars, and seminal Oregon-based punk rock band Wipers. Since mid-2007, he has been the full-time touring drummer with Grammy-award winning country duo Sugarland.

McNabb has equipment endorsement relationships with Ludwig drums, Pro-Mark drumsticks, Remo drum heads, and Zildjian cymbals.

== Early life ==
Travis McNabb was born a third-generation musician in New Orleans, Louisiana. His grandfather Edgar McNabb was a bluegrass guitarist and dobro player, and his father Richard played guitar in area rock bands during the 1960s. McNabb initially dabbled in guitar and piano, but took up the drums at age 15.

== Career ==
=== Wipers ===
By age 18, McNabb was already on the road, touring with Oregon-based punk band Wipers, and manning the drum set for what became their final tour. After finishing this stint, McNabb began several years of session and touring work with acts such as Vigilantes of Love, Billy Pilgrim, Shawn Mullins, and the Indigo Girls before joining Eli Braden, Robert Levon Been, and Jeremy Kunz to form the Beggars.

=== Better Than Ezra ===
In January 1996, McNabb auditioned for New Orleans–based Alternative-Rock band Better Than Ezra, and was hired to replace departing founding drummer Cary Bonnecaze. For the next 13 years, McNabb was a member of the band, playing countless live shows, as well as recording four albums, a re-recorded rarities collection, non-album tracks for compilations and a greatest hits collection, and a live album/DVD release.

=== Sugarland ===
Following the better part of two decades on the road and in the studio, Better Than Ezra took a brief hiatus in early 2007. During this period, guitarist/songwriter Kevin Griffin found himself writing songs for other artists, and bassist Tom Drummond began producing other acts at the band's New Orleans recording facility, Fudge Studios. This break provided McNabb with the opportunity to return to his roots as a session and touring musician for hire while still maintaining his association with the band.

Upon hearing of his availability, former Billy Pilgrim bandmate Kristian Bush contacted McNabb about playing some studio sessions for his new act, Country/Bluegrass duo Sugarland. After these recordings were completed, McNabb was offered a spot touring with the band, which he accepted. Beginning in August 2007, McNabb hit the road with Bush, his partner Jennifer Nettles, and their backing band, playing shows in support of Sugarland's album Enjoy the Ride. During this period, he continued to play sporadic shows with Better Than Ezra during special appearances and one-off bookings they accepted during their break.

In January 2009, Better Than Ezra made the announcement that McNabb would be leaving the band as a full-time member in order to concentrate on the increasing demands placed on his time due to Sugarland's brisk touring schedule. At the same time, McNabb's replacement was announced to be former Pleasure Club drummer Michael Jerome. Both sides stressed the amicable nature of the parting, which was reinforced by the fact that McNabb remains on the board of Better Than Ezra's charitable organization The Ezra Foundation (a fund which focuses on the rebuilding of areas of New Orleans struck by Hurricane Katrina). In addition, McNabb returned to the band briefly to play a set with Better Than Ezra during the victory party for the NFL's New Orleans Saints upon the team's Super Bowl win in early 2010. McNabb also appears as the drummer on several tracks of Better Than Ezra's 2009 release "Paper Empire."

McNabb's official final performance with Better Than Ezra was at Family Gras in Metairie, Louisiana, on February 15, 2009.

=== Current ===
McNabb continues his association with Sugarland, playing drums at all of the band's live appearances at concert venues, as well as television specials and awards shows. In addition, he was the primary studio drummer on Sugarland's 2010 release "The Incredible Machine," as well as several tracks on their Christmas-music collection "Gold and Green."

During brief breaks in Sugarland's tour schedule, McNabb has also recently picked up road work with other current artists, including Brendan Benson (of The Raconteurs) and Country act Little Big Town, as well as session work with artists such as Howie Day, Dar Williams, and Mandi Perkins. In addition, he has performed with both Kristian Bush and Jennifer Nettles of Sugarland during television and other live solo appearances.

From July 2013 to June 2014, McNabb toured as the drummer with Country music duo Big & Rich. McNabb's first affiliation with Big & Rich came in 2010, when he was invited to organize the backing band for a Haiti earthquake relief benefit put together by one of that group's founders, Big Kenny Alphin.

Starting in mid-2014, McNabb toured with singer-songwriter Gavin DeGraw.

As of 2015, McNabb has been the drummer with the backing band of alt-country artist Frankie Ballard.

In 2022, McNabb signed on as the drummer for the "Celebrating David Bowie" tribute tour, playing multiple dates as part of an all-star band that also featured Todd Rundgren, Adrian Belew, Royston Langdon of Spacehog, and Fishbone's Angelo Moore.

== Personal life ==
McNabb currently resides in Nashville, Tennessee, with his wife Cristy, and their dogs Maggie and Emmy Lou. He is a classic motorcycle and vehicle enthusiast, and enjoys collecting and playing vintage drum and percussion gear. McNabb also recently opened a drum tracking studio, Wood Hill Recording, where he offers his services as a studio percussionist and audio engineer.
