= Tom Drummond (musician) =

American musician

- Drummond performing in 2011

Background information
- Born: June 30, 1969 (age 57); Shreveport, Louisiana, U.S.
- Instrument: Bass
- Member of: Better Than Ezra

Tom Melville Drummond (born June 30, 1969 Shreveport, Louisiana) is an American musician. He is currently the bassist and background vocalist for the band, Better Than Ezra.

Drummond is one of the four original founding members who formed Better Than Ezra in 1988. He had graduated from Caddo Magnet High School and was attending Louisiana State University at the time. Drummond, along with lead vocalist Kevin Griffin, are the only two original members of Better Than Ezra currently active with the band.

Tom Drummond is currently the only member of Better Than Ezra who still resides full-time in New Orleans as of 2009. Bandmates Kevin Griffin and Michael Jerome are based in Nashville and Los Angeles respectively.
