= Better Than Ezra =

American rock band

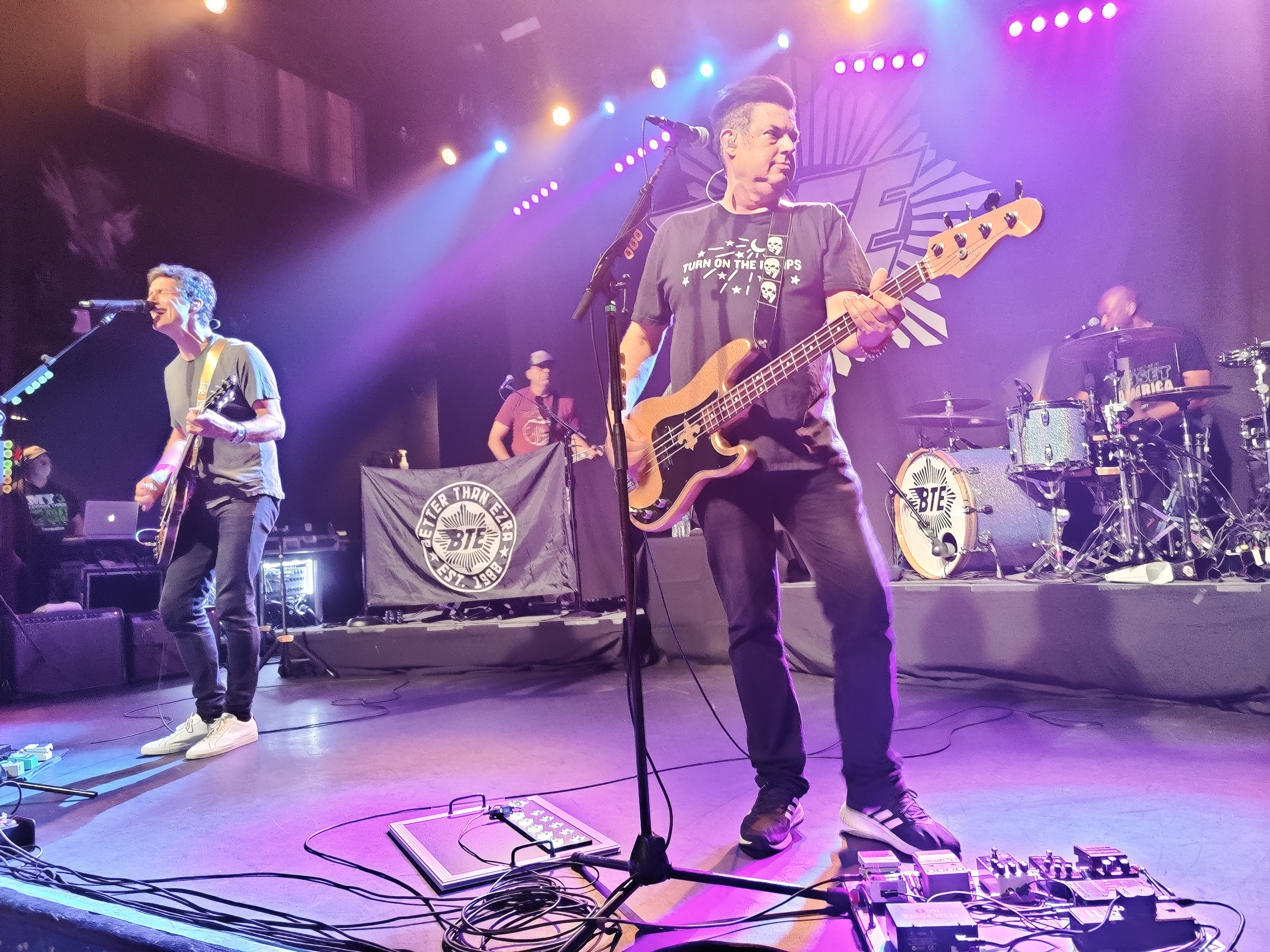
- Better Than Ezra performing in 2022

Background information
- Origin: Baton Rouge, Louisiana, U.S.
- Genres: Alternative rock; post-grunge
- Works: Discography
- Years active: 1988–present
- Labels: Artemis; Swell; Elektra; Beyond; Sanctuary; The End; Round Hill
- Members: Kevin Griffin; Tom Drummond; James Arthur Payne Jr.; Michael Jerome
- Past members: Joel Rundell; Cary Bonnecaze; Travis McNabb
- Website: betterthanezra.com

Better Than Ezra is an American alternative rock band based in New Orleans, Louisiana, and signed with Round Hill Music. The band formed in 1988 in Baton Rouge, Louisiana, and consists of Kevin Griffin (vocals and guitar), Tom Drummond (bass guitar), Michael Jerome (drums), and James Arthur Payne Jr. (guitar, keyboards). The band has released nine studio albums, most recently 2024's Super Magick. They are best known for their 1993 multi-platinum album Deluxe and the 1995 single "Good", which reached number 1 on the Billboard Modern Rock Tracks chart.

== History ==
=== Formation and early success ===
Better Than Ezra was formed in 1988 by vocalist and guitarist Kevin Griffin, lead guitarist Joel Rundell, bassist Tom Drummond, and drummer Cary Bonnecaze. All four members were attending Louisiana State University at the time of the band's formation. Better Than Ezra's first public performance was at Murphy's in Baton Rouge, Louisiana, also in 1988. Though many theories abound, the band refuses to disclose the origin of its name. Fans of the group often refer to themselves as Ezralites.

Better Than Ezra circulated a demo cassette tape later in 1988, the Chime Street Demo. While not an official release, this demo is sought after by the band's fans, and traded by collectors. In 1989, the band recorded their debut album, Surprise, which was released only on cassette the following year.

Joel Rundell, the band's lead guitarist, died by suicide on August 8, 1990. The remaining three members of the band took some time off to reassess its future following Rundell's death. Griffin, Drummond and Bonnecaze reunited Better Than Ezra as a trio by the end of 1990. The trio continued playing house parties and fraternity shows across the southern United States during the early 1990s.

The band released its first nationally distributed album, Deluxe, in 1993 on its own indie label, Swell Records, which caught the attention of major record labels and radio. Better Than Ezra signed with Elektra Records in 1994, and the label re-released Deluxe the following year. Its single "Good" reached No. 1 on the Hot Modern Rock Tracks chart, which helped push the album to platinum record status by the end of 1995.

Success came quickly to Better Than Ezra. Tom Drummond commented later in a 1998 interview with CNN, "It took us seven years to get signed, and then seven weeks to get to No. 1", when describing the overnight success of Deluxe and its single "Good".

=== 1996–2000 ===
After Deluxe's major label release, original drummer Cary Bonnecaze left the band in 1996. He was replaced by drummer Travis McNabb, formerly of the band Vigilantes of Love, who was tapped to play on the band's upcoming album, Friction, Baby. Bonnecaze's departure set off a series of lawsuits and counter-suits between Bonnecaze and Better Than Ezra. Bonnecaze, who took his suit to the United States District Court in New Orleans, argued that the band owed him money "based on his role in fortifying the band's reputation", according to Rolling Stone. He asked for approximately $1 million in damages. A settlement was reached between the band and Bonnecaze on August 5, 1999. The exact terms of the settlement were not released at the time, though Better Than Ezra's manager John Isbell was quoted as saying that Bonnecaze received "way less" than the one million dollars he had originally requested.

Better Than Ezra released their second major label album, Friction, Baby, in 1996 through Elektra Records. The album produced the hits "Desperately Wanting" and "King of New Orleans". Friction, Baby was not as commercially successful as Deluxe, but has sold almost 500,000 units as of 1999.

The trio began work on their third major release, How Does Your Garden Grow?, soon after the end of touring for Friction, Baby. The album was recorded between mid-January and late-April at a studio in New Orleans. The album was produced by record producer Malcolm Burn, who had formerly produced Iggy Pop and U2, and released on August 25, 1998. The album was described as "experimental" and a significant departure from their previous two albums. Griffin described the album in 1998 as "guitar driven ... rhythmic." Likewise, Tom Drummond described the band's thinking on its third major album, "We thought the third album was a very important record, because generally a band either makes or breaks on the third record. We wanted it to be a record that didn't necessarily sound like what people expected." Despite the emphasis on guitar experimentation, two tracks, "One More Murder" and "Je ne m'en souviens pas" contain no guitars.

The single "At the Stars" debuted, and peaked, at number 78 on the Billboard Hot 100. The band was dropped by Elektra Records following the release of How Does Your Garden Grow? in 1999.

=== 2000–2008 ===
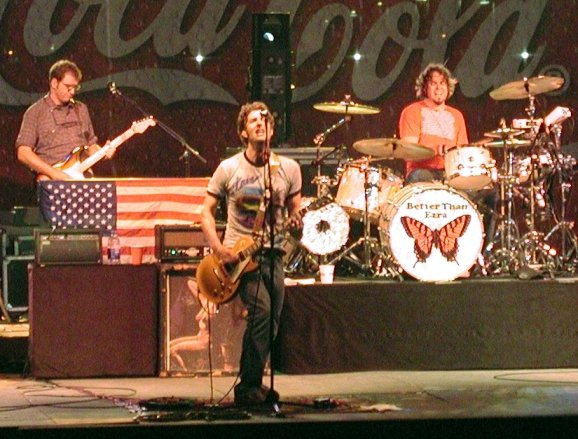
Better Than Ezra performing in 2002

The band released the B-Sides and rarities collection Artifakt on its own "Ezra Dry Goods/Fudge" label in 2000. Artifakt was only sold online and at concerts. Tom Drummond, the band's bassist, noted in 2002, "It's basically an album full of rarities."

Better Than Ezra, now no longer with Elektra Records, signed with the Beyond Music label and began work on new material. Drummond explained the reasoning for choosing a smaller label, "We decided we wanted to be big fish in a small pond instead of a little fish in a big pond. We just wanted to be with a label who wanted success as much as we did."

Griffin, Drummond and McNabb spent 18 months working on Closer, their follow-up album to 1998's How Does Your Garden Grow? and their first new material since being dropped by Elektra Records. The album was recorded in New Orleans in the band's own studio, which allowed the members to focus on creating music rather than rental costs per day. Closer was mixed in Los Angeles by Better Than Ezra and the album's producer, Brad Wood. However, the band felt that some tracks needed scratching. Producer Brad Wood's management company recommended DJ Swamp, who had previously worked with Beck, to mix several tracks. The use of a DJ for two of the album's tracks, the first single "Extra Ordinary" and "Recognize", marked a departure for the band, who hadn't previously employed a DJ before.

Closer was released on August 7, 2001. Better Than Ezra launched a tour in support of the album on July 26, 2001. The first single off the album, "Extra Ordinary", which had been mixed by DJ Swamp, was inspired by an AC/DC song. The album's promotion hit a snag after its record label, Beyond Music, was closed down following a business dispute towards the end of 2002, shortly after Closer's release. Beyond Music's closure left Closer out of print for several years. In June 2009, Better Than Ezra announced that it had acquired the rights to Closer and would re-release it in the Fall of 2009 with two new previously unreleased tracks, "Simple Song" and "Screwed Up and Beautiful".

In June 2001, Better Than Ezra filmed a series of commercials for ESPN's College GameDay. The promo features the band while sports analyst Lee Corso crowd surfs to the stage, where he continues his sports reporting.

On September 28, 2004, the band simultaneously released their first live concert DVD, as well as an official live album, both entitled Live at the House of Blues, New Orleans through Sanctuary Records. The DVD and album were filmed and recorded at two separate shows at the House of Blues in New Orleans during the summer of 2004.

A Greatest Hits collection was released on March 15, 2005, through Rhino Entertainment, a division of the Warner Music Group.

The band's sixth studio album Before the Robots (Artemis Records) was released on May 31, 2005. In 2005, Desperate Housewives creator Marc Cherry used the band's song "Juicy" as the background music for the second season of the show's promotional advertisements, which Griffin credited with bringing attention to the album. The song "Juicy" has also been heard in the background in commercials for Applebee's restaurants.

=== Since 2009 ===
Longtime drummer Travis McNabb left Better Than Ezra in February 2009 and their last performance together was Family Gras in Metairie, Louisiana. The primary reason given for his departure was the demand on his time by country and bluegrass group, Sugarland, with whom McNabb had previously been touring for some time. The split was amicable, with bassist Tom Drummond saying, "It's bittersweet. He's fantastic. We're still good friends, and there are no hard feelings. We'll miss him. But this is an opportunity he needed to take." Announced at the same time was McNabb's replacement, New Orleans–based drummer Michael Jerome, formerly of the band Pleasure Club. In addition, Better Than Ezra announced the May 12, 2009, release date for their seventh studio album, entitled Paper Empire, which is produced by Warren Huart and singer Kevin Griffin. The first single, "Absolutely Still", was released for iTunes purchase on March 17.

On May 22, 2013, Griffin confirmed that the band plans to release their first new album since 2009 later in the year.

On February 10, 2014, it was announced that the band had signed with The End Records for the release of their eighth studio album. The album, All Together Now, was released on September 9, 2014.

On August 29, 2014, the twenty-fifth anniversary edition of Surprise was released. According to original drummer Cary Bonnecaze, "The family of Joel Rundell (our original guitarist who passed away in 1990) and I own the original recording, and we thought that with 2014 being the 25th anniversary of its original release, it would be a good time to release it." On June 1, 2018, BTE released a new track called "Grateful" via The End Records.

On August 13–14, 2021, Better Than Ezra played a pair of sold-out shows at the House of Blues New Orleans in order to celebrate the 25th anniversary of their second album Friction, Baby. During these shows, the band played the album in its entirety, as well as some other fan-favorite songs. A few months later, the band returned to the same venue to play their album Closer in its entirety to another sold-out crowd.

In October 2022, during their "Legends of the Fall" tour, Griffin revealed that the band would be releasing a new album in 2023. "Mystified", a single from the forthcoming album, was released on July 18, 2023. The band's latest single, "Contact High", was released on November 3, 2023.

On March 8, 2024, the band's ninth studio album Super Magick was announced, and the single "Live a Little" was released. After some brief delays, Super Magick was released on May 3, 2024, on Round Hill Records.

In a September 2026 interview ahead of Better Than Ezra's Bourbon & Beyond performance, bassist Tom Drummond said the band had recorded three or four new songs and that he expected an album in 2027.

== Band members ==
Current members

- Tom Drummond – bass guitar, backing vocals (1988–present)
- Kevin Griffin – lead vocals, guitar, piano (1988–present)
- James Arthur Payne Jr. – guitar, keyboards, backing vocals (1996–present)
- Michael Jerome – drums, backing vocals (2009–present)

Former members

- Cary Bonnecaze – drums, backing vocals (1988–1996)
- Joel Rundell – lead guitar, backing vocals (1988–1990; his death)
- Travis McNabb – drums (1996–2009)

Touring members

- Alex Allemang – keyboards, backing vocals (1993–1996)
- Neal Josten – keyboards, key grip, backing vocals (1993–1997)

== Discography ==
Studio albums

- Surprise (1990)
- Deluxe (1993)
- Friction, Baby (1996)
- How Does Your Garden Grow? (1998)
- Closer (2001)
- Before the Robots (2005)
- Paper Empire (2009)
- All Together Now (2014)
- Super Magick (2024)
