= Seether discography =

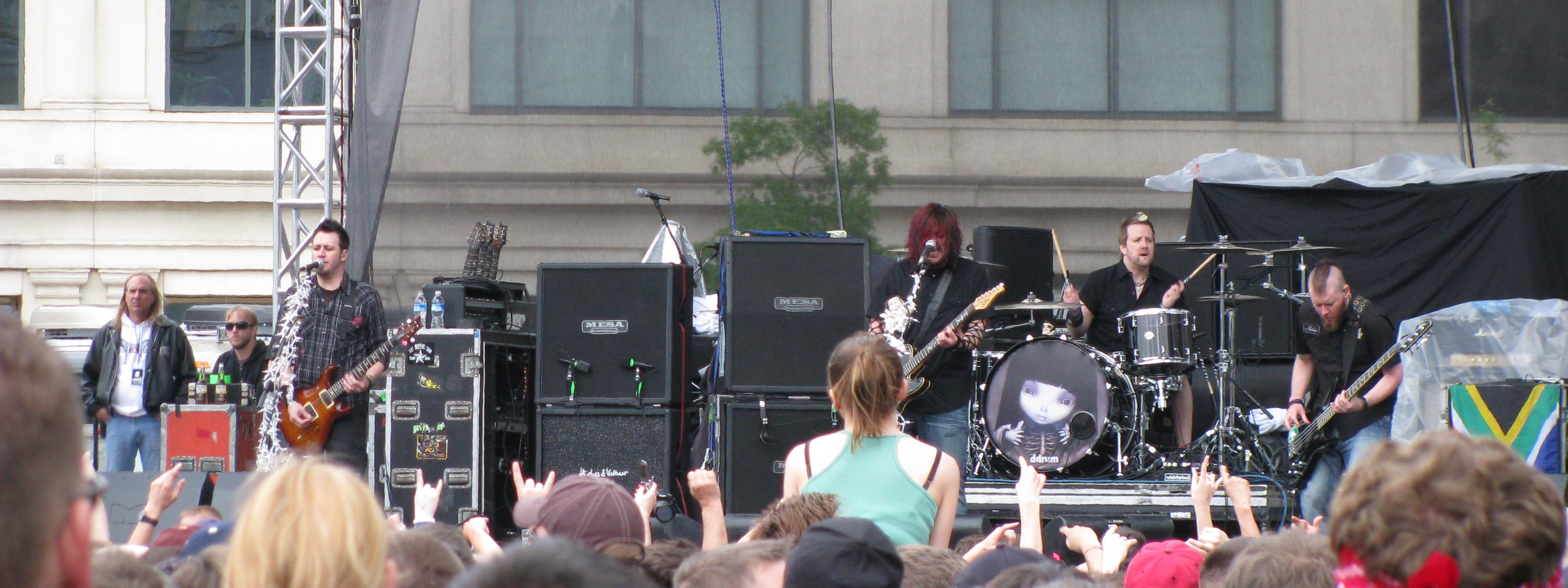
- Seether playing live at the DC101 Chili Cookoff in 2008
- Studio albums: 10
- Extended plays: 7
- Soundtrack albums: 17
- Compilation albums: 5
- Singles: 27
- Video albums: 1
- Music videos: 29

This is the general discography of the South African rock band Seether.

== Albums ==
=== Studio albums ===
Title	Album details	Peak chart positions									Certifications
Title	Album details	AUS	AUT	CAN	FRA	GER	NZ	SWI	UK	US	Certifications
Fragile (as Saron Gas)	Released: 1 December 2000; Label: Musketeer	—	—	—	—	—	—	—	—	—	
Disclaimer	Released: 20 August 2002; Label: Wind-up, Musketeer	—	—	—	—	—	—	—	—	92	RIAA: Gold
Disclaimer II	Released: 15 June 2004; Label: Wind-up, Musketeer	38	38	38	145	43	12	53	117	53	ARIA: Gold; MC: Gold; RIAA: Platinum; RMNZ: Platinum
Karma and Effect	Released: 24 May 2005; Label: Wind-up, Musketeer	39	—	13	168	94	25	74	—	8	MC: Gold; RIAA: Platinum; RMNZ: Gold
Finding Beauty in Negative Spaces	Released: 23 October 2007; Label: Wind-up, Musketeer	—	—	10	154	—	9	39	—	9	MC: Gold; RIAA: Platinum; RMNZ: Platinum
Holding Onto Strings Better Left to Fray	Released: 17 May 2011; Label: Wind-up, Musketeer	50	69	3	—	53	6	21	—	2	RIAA: Gold
Isolate and Medicate	Released: 1 July 2014; Label: The Bicycle Music Company	43	45	6	—	32	24	33	78	4	RIAA: Gold
Poison the Parish	Released: 12 May 2017; Label: Canine Riot	29	23	25	—	26	—	16	72	14	
Si Vis Pacem, Para Bellum	Released: 28 August 2020; Label: Fantasy	21	27	—	152	37	—	—	—	37	
The Surface Seems So Far	Released: 20 September 2024; Label: Fantasy	—	—	—	—	99	—	58	—	138	
"—" denotes a release that did not chart or was not released to that country.

=== Video albums ===
Title	Album details	Peak chart positions	
Title	Album details	US	US Rock
One Cold Night	Released: 11 July 2006; Label: Wind-up	50	20

=== Compilation albums ===
Title	Album details	Peak chart positions	Certifications
Title	Album details	US	Certifications
iTunes Originals	Released: 5 August 2008; Label: Wind-up	—	
Native Noise Collection Vol. 1 – The Seether Sessions	Released: 11 November 2009; Label: Musketeer	—	
The Collection	Released: March 2012; Label: Wind-up	—	
Seether: 2002–2013	Released: 29 October 2013; Label: Wind-up	—	
The Very Best of Seether (Walmart Exclusive)	Released: June 2019; Label: Craft Recordings	—	
Vicennial – 2 Decades of Seether	Released: 15 October 2021; Label: Craft Recordings	195	PMB: Platinum

== EPs ==
Title	Extended play details
5 Songs	Released: 10 August 2002; Label: Wind-up
Seether	Released: 10 August 2002; Label: Wind-up
Rhapsody Originals	Released: 14 October 2008; Label: Wind-up
Remix EP	Released: 1 February 2012; Label: Wind-up
Walmart Soundcheck (Walmart Exclusive)	Released: April 2014; Label: Bicycle Music Company
Wasteland – The Purgatory EP	Released: 30 July 2021; Label: Fantasy Records
Acoustic Originals	Released: 11 October 2023; Label: Fantasy Records
Beneath the Surface	Released: 17 April 2026; Label: Concord Records

== Singles ==
=== 2000s ===
Year	Singles	Peak chart positions											Certifications	Album
Year	Singles	AUS	CAN	NLD	NZ	SWI	UK	US	US Adult	US Alt.	US Main.	US Rock	Certifications	Album
2002	"Fine Again"	67	—	—	—	—	—	61	—	6	3	—	RIAA: 2× Platinum; RMNZ: Platinum	Disclaimer
2003	"Driven Under"	—	—	—	—	—	—	122	—	13	13	—	RIAA: Gold	Disclaimer
2003	"Gasoline"	—	—	—	—	—	—	—	—	37	8	—	RIAA: Gold	Disclaimer
2004	"Broken" (featuring Amy Lee)	3	2	30	2	27	106	20	12	4	9	—	ARIA: Platinum; PMB: Gold; RIAA: 4× Platinum; RMNZ: 2x Platinum	Disclaimer II
2005	"Remedy"	42	—	—	—	—	—	70	—	5	1	—	RIAA: 2× Platinum; RMNZ: Platinum	Karma and Effect
2005	"Truth"	—	—	—	—	—	—	123	—	25	8	—		Karma and Effect
2006	"The Gift"	—	—	—	—	—	—	—	—	29	8	—		Karma and Effect
2007	"Fake It"	49	38	—	14	—	—	56	—	1	1	—	BPI: Silver; RIAA: 3× Platinum; RMNZ: 2× Platinum	Finding Beauty in Negative Spaces
2008	"Rise Above This"	—	58	—	—	—	—	91	18	1	2	—	RIAA: Gold	Finding Beauty in Negative Spaces
2008	"Breakdown"	—	98	—	—	—	—	106	—	4	4	—	RIAA: Gold	Finding Beauty in Negative Spaces
2009	"Careless Whisper"	—	57	—	—	—	—	63	31	5	4	4	RIAA: 2× Platinum; RMNZ: Gold	Finding Beauty in Negative Spaces
"—" denotes a release that did not chart or was not released to that country.

=== 2010s ===
Year	Singles	Peak chart positions							Certifications	Album
Year	Singles	CAN	US	US Alt.	US Main.	US Rock	US Hard Rock Digi.	US Rock Airplay	Certifications	Album
2011	"Country Song"	53	72	8	1	2	1	2	RIAA: Platinum; RMNZ: Gold	Holding Onto Strings Better Left to Fray
2011	"Tonight"	76	113	7	1	4	3	4	RIAA: Gold	Holding Onto Strings Better Left to Fray
2012	"No Resolution"	—	—	23	2	8	—	8		Holding Onto Strings Better Left to Fray
2012	"Here and Now"	—	—	27	5	21	—	18		Holding Onto Strings Better Left to Fray
2013	"Seether"	—	—	—	12	—	—	39		Seether: 2002–2013
2013	"Weak"	—	—	—	5	—	—	22		Seether: 2002–2013
2014	"Words as Weapons"	95	—	28	1	18	1	12	RIAA: Platinum	Isolate and Medicate
2014	"Same Damn Life"	—	—	33	2	30	17	16	RIAA: Gold	Isolate and Medicate
2015	"Nobody Praying for Me"	—	—	—	6	39	10	29	RIAA: Platinum	Isolate and Medicate
2015	"Save Today"	—	—	—	4	44	—	23		Isolate and Medicate
2017	"Let You Down"	—	—	38	1	25	3	8		Poison the Parish
2017	"Betray and Degrade"	—	—	—	2	29	—	16		Poison the Parish
2018	"Against the Wall"	—	—	—	19	—	—	—		Poison the Parish
"—" denotes a release that did not chart or was not released to that country.

=== 2020s ===
Year	Singles	Peak chart positions					Album
Year	Singles	US Main.	US Rock	US Hard Rock Digi.	US Hot Hard Rock	US Rock Airplay	Album
2020	"Dangerous"	1	36	4	3	8	Si Vis Pacem, Para Bellum
2020	"Bruised and Bloodied"	1	—	5	7	9	Si Vis Pacem, Para Bellum
2021	"Wasteland"	1	—	—	7	7	Si Vis Pacem, Para Bellum
2024	"Judas Mind"	1	—	—	9	8	The Surface Seems So Far
2024	"Lost All Control"	19	—	—	24	50	The Surface Seems So Far
2024	"Walls Come Down"	4	—	—	16	13	The Surface Seems So Far
2026	"Into the Ground"	—	—	—	—	—	Beneath the Surface
"—" denotes a release that did not chart or was not released to that country.

=== Promotional singles ===
Title	Year	Peak chart positions		Album
Title	Year	US Hard Rock Digi.	US Hot Hard Rock	Album
"Forsaken"	2011	8	—	Holding Onto Strings Better Left to Fray
"Suffer It All"	2014	11	—	Isolate and Medicate
"Watch Me Drown"	2014	—	—	Isolate and Medicate
"Stoke the Fire"	2017	20	—	Poison the Parish
"Count Me Out"	2017	—	—	Poison the Parish
"Nothing Left"	2017	—	—	Poison the Parish
"Beg"	2020	19	22	Si Vis Pacem, Para Bellum
"Illusion"	2024	—	24	The Surface Seems So Far
"—" denotes a release that did not chart or was not released to that country.

== Music videos ==
Year	Song	Director	Ref.
2002	"Fine Again"	Paul Fedor	
2003	"Driven Under"	Glen Bennet	
2003	"Gasoline"	Glen Bennet	
2003	"Sympathetic"	Glen Bennet	
2004	"Broken" (featuring Amy Lee)	Nigel Dick	
2005	"Remedy"	Dean Karr	
2005	"Truth"	Dean Karr	
2006	"The Gift"	Meiert Avis	
2007	"Fake It"	Tony Petrossian	
2008	"Rise Above This"	Tony Petrossian	
2008	"Breakdown"	Tony Petrossian	
2009	"Careless Whisper"	Tony Petrossian	
2011	"Country Song"	Roman White	
2011	"Tonight"	Seth Dennemann	
2012	"Here and Now"		
2013	"Pass Slowly"	Darren Craig	
2014	"Words as Weapons"	Benno Nelson	
2014	"Same Damn Life"	Nathan Cox	
2015	"Nobody Praying for Me"	Sherif Higazy	
2015	"Save Today"	Nathan Cox	
2017	"Let You Down"	Nathan Cox	
2017	"Stoke the Fire"		
2017	"Betray and Degrade"	Nathan Cox	
2018	"Against the Wall" (acoustic)		
2020	"Dangerous"	Mertcan Mertbilek	
2020	"Beg"	Mertcan Mertbilek	
2021	"Bruised and Bloodied"	Alex Chaloff	
2021	"Wasteland"	Genéa Gaudet	
2022	"What Would You Do?"	Jon Vulpine	
2024	"Judas Mind"	David Brodsky	
2025	"Lost All Control"	Scotty Felix	

== Soundtrack appearances ==
Year	Song(s)	Album
2002	"Fine Again"	Madden 2003
2003	"Hang On"	Daredevil
2003	"Out of My Way"	Freddy vs. Jason
2003	"Fine Again"	Freddy vs. Jason
2003	"Pig"	The Texas Chainsaw Massacre
2003	"Fine Again"	1080° Avalanche
2004	"Broken" (featuring Amy Lee)	The Punisher
2004	"Sold Me"	The Punisher
2006	"Remedy"	Test Drive Unlimited
2006	"Needles" (One Cold Night version)	Masters of Horror II
2007	"Out of My Way"	World's Strongest Man
2008	"Remedy"	Guitar Hero On Tour: Decades
2008	"Burrito" (One Cold Night version)	Lost Boys: The Tribe
2008	"Fallen"	Punisher: War Zone
2009	"No Shelter"	NCIS
2009	"I've Got You Under My Skin" (Frank Sinatra cover)	His Way, Our Way
2009	"Fake It"	Burnout Paradise
2009	"Given"	The Stepfather
2012	"Desire for Need (Dragon in Me)" (Roger Sanchez remix)	Dragon Age: Dawn of the Seekers
