= SnoCore Tour =

American rock music festival tour

- Genre: Alternative rock; alternative metal; punk rock
- Dates: January – April
- Location: United States
- Years active: 1995 – 2015
- Founders: Rick Bonde
- Website: http://www.snocore.com/ at the Wayback Machine (archived December 18, 2014)

The SnoCore Tour, occasionally typeset as Sno-Core, was an annual festival tour of the United States. It featured performances by some of the most popular groups largely of the alternative rock and metal spectrum. The event took place every year since its inception in December 1995 until 2015 (with the exceptions of 2008, 2011, 2012 and 2013). SnoCore was marketed towards the winter sports culture.

== History ==
John Boyle, Eric Lochtefeld and Rick Bonde established SnoCore as an entertainment opportunity for fans during the year's slow point in live music, the winter season. Originally began as a mini tour in December 1995 headlined by Sublime, it would also serve as an excuse for bands to perform for Western mountain resort towns and go snowboarding. SnoCore originally focused predominantly on punk and ska groups and routed through ski communities. But as it became a national tour, SnoCore aimed toward hard rock and heavy metal and engaged larger, more traditional concert venues. In late 1997, ARTISTdirect principals Marc Geiger and Don Muller, the former having also co-founded Lollapalooza, purchased the tour from Boyle. They still make a point to schedule dates in a number of resort towns despite having strayed somewhat from its original concept.

Corresponding with its name, SnoCore features large video screens playing footage of freestyle snowboarding and skiing between performances. Local shops have set up at concerts and local resorts have tied in with them. However, SnoCore does not feature sideshows as showcased at the Warped Tour and remains strictly a musical festival. The tour commonly hosts a sponsor; examples include Airwalk in 1997, Levi's in 1999, and Winterfresh in 2005.

On March 10, 1998, Foil Records released the Sno-Core Compilation which features various bands that have partaken in the festival. In 2001, SnoCore split into two tours: the funk/jam based SnoCore Icicle Ball and the hard rock/heavy metal based SnoCore Rock. This carried on once more the following year.

During the 2006 tour, stomach flu ran its course through all participating bands. Most severely affected was Seether frontman Shaun Morgan who, rather than cancel altogether, opted to perform acoustic sets for their last few shows. This alternative met with high approval from fans and influenced the group to release their first acoustic album, One Cold Night.

Saliva was scheduled to co-headline the 2009 tour but frontman Josey Scott needed more time to recover from a recent ulcer surgery. As a result, the band intended to cancel the first two weeks and substitute Scott with Walt Lafty of Silvertide beginning April 17. Ultimately, they decided in the interest of the fans to drop out entirely. This made the 2009 band lineup the leanest in SnoCore history.

Jägermeister sponsored the first Canadian SnoCore tour in 2010. The schedule ran just under two weeks and included cities such as Calgary, Edmonton, Toronto, and Vancouver.

== Tour lineups ==
=== 1995 ===
- Sublime
- Guttermouth
- Skankin' Pickle
- Rhythm Collision
- Safe To Face

=== 1996 ===
- Sublime
- Guttermouth
- Assorted Jelly Beans
- Less Than Jake
- Skankin' Pickle
- theLINE

=== 1997 ===
- Face to Face
- The Pharcyde
- Voodoo Glow Skulls
- Powerman 5000 (select dates)
- Less Than Jake (select dates)
- Orange 9mm (select dates)
- Salmon (select dates)

=== 1998 ===
- Primus
- Blink-182
- The Aquabats
- Long Beach Dub Allstars (Feb 7 – Feb 21)
- Tha Alkaholiks (Feb 28 – Mar 16)
- Mephiskapheles (select dates)

=== 1999 ===
- Everclear
- Soul Coughing
- Redman (first half of tour)
- The Black Eyed Peas (second half of tour)
- DJ Spooky

=== 2000 ===
- System of a Down
- Incubus
- Mr. Bungle
- Puya
- Boy Hits Car (select dates)

=== 2001 ===
Rock

- Fear Factory
- Kittie
- Union Underground
- Slaves on Dope
- Boy Hits Car

Icicle Ball

- Colonel Les Claypool's Fearless Flying Frog Brigade
- Galactic
- Lake Trout
- Drums & Tuba

=== 2002 ===
Rock

- Alien Ant Farm
- Adema
- Local H
- Glassjaw
- Earshot
- The Apex Theory (Fenix*TX was originally announced for the tour but they dropped out a week before tour starts)

Icicle Ball

- Karl Denson's Tiny Universe
- Spearhead
- Nikka Costa
- Ozomatli
- Blackalicious
- Sector 9
- Saul Williams

=== 2003 ===
- Sparta
- Glassjaw
- Hot Water Music
- Dredg

=== 2004 ===
- Trapt
- Smile Empty Soul
- Finger Eleven
- Strata

=== 2005 ===
- Chevelle
- Helmet
- Crossfade
- Future Leaders of the World
- Strata

=== 2006 ===
- Seether
- Shinedown
- Flyleaf
- Halestorm

=== 2007 ===
- Army of Anyone
- Dropping Daylight
- Hurt
- Neurosonic

=== 2009 ===
- Static-X
- Burn Halo
- The Flood

Saliva was originally scheduled to co-headline but canceled due to Josey Scott's prolonged recovery from ulcer surgery.

=== 2010 ===
- Protest the Hero
- Theset
- Elias
- Abandon All Ships (select dates)
- Doll (select dates)

Hawthorne Heights was scheduled to take part in the tour, but were forced to drop off due to immigration paperwork issues.

=== 2014 (cancelled) ===
- The Pretty Reckless
- Heaven's Basement
- The Letter Black
- Crobot

=== 2015 ===
- Flyleaf
- Adelitas Way
- Framing Hanley
- Fit for Rivals
- Romantic Rebel (select dates)
- Lullwater (select dates)
