= One Cold Night =

Live album by Seether
- Released: 11 July 2006
- Genre: Post-grunge; acoustic rock; alternative rock
- Length: 58:03 (CD); 62:35 (DVD)
- Label: Wind-up
- Producer: Shaun Morgan

Seether chronology
Karma and Effect (2005)	One Cold Night (2006)	Finding Beauty in Negative Spaces (2007)

Professional ratings
Review scores
Source	Rating
Allmusic	3.5/5 stars
IGN	7.5/10 stars
Ultimate Guitar	8.9/10

One Cold Night is a live album by South African rock band Seether. It was released on 11 July 2006 and features twelve acoustic tracks, plus bonus DVD footage, recorded in Philadelphia, Pennsylvania, at the Grape Street Club, on 22 February 2006. The album comprises live acoustic renditions of songs from the band's Fragile, Disclaimer, and Karma and Effect albums, a cover song, and a remixed version of "The Gift".

== Track listing ==
Standard edition
No.	Title	Length
1.	"Gasoline"	2:57
2.	"Driven Under"	4:58
3.	"Diseased"	3:46
4.	"Truth"	5:15
5.	"Immortality" (Pearl Jam cover)	5:02
6.	"Tied My Hands"	5:16
7.	"Sympathetic"	4:12
8.	"Fine Again"	5:05
9.	"Broken"	4:17
10.	"The Gift"	5:36
11.	"Remedy"	3:41
12.	"Plastic Man"	3:34
13.	"The Gift (alternate mix)" (studio track)	4:24

iTunes edition bonus tracks
No.	Title	Length
14.	"Needles" (originally the second song in the set, after "Gasoline")	4:54
15.	"Burrito" (originally the third song in the set, before "Driven Under")	4:02

== Notes ==
The songs "Needles" and "Burrito" from this show were used as iTunes bonus tracks, because the record company did not want profanity on the retail version of the album. "Needles" was later featured on the Masters of Horror II soundtrack, while "Burrito" was included on the Lost Boys: The Tribe soundtrack.

The DVD features an in-depth interview with the band as well as behind-the-scenes footage from their video shoot of "The Gift", among other features.

== Personnel ==
- Shaun Morgan – lead vocals, rhythm guitar
- Dale Stewart – bass, backing vocals (lead guitar on "Broken")
- John Humphrey – drums
- Pat Callahan – lead guitar (bass on "Broken")

== Charts ==
Chart (2006)	Peak position
Billboard 200	50
Rock Albums Chart	20
