= Breakdown (Seether song) =

2008 song

Single by Seether

from the album Finding Beauty in Negative Spaces
- Released: 9 August 2008
- Recorded: 2006–2007
- Genre: Post-grunge; alternative metal
- Length: 3:29
- Label: Wind-up
- Songwriters: Shaun Morgan; Dale Stewart; John Humphrey
- Producer: Howard Benson

Seether singles chronology
"Rise Above This" (2008)	"Breakdown" (2008)	"Careless Whisper" (2009)

Music video
- "Breakdown" on YouTube

"Breakdown" is a song by South African rock band Seether. It is the third track and the third single from the band's third album, Finding Beauty in Negative Spaces. Frontman Shaun Morgan has offered conflicting statements in the past regarding the inspiration behind the song. While early speculation among fans suggested it was written in response to his relationship with Amy Lee, particularly as a reply to Evanescence's track "Call Me When You're Sober", Morgan initially refuted this and insisted it was about a different relationship, stating "Amy and I, at our worst moments, were still better than this last girl and I at our best moments". However, in a 2010 performance of "Breakdown" he admitted the song was about Lee.

Morgan says that he did not anticipate "Breakdown" to be such a popular song; he wrote the song to air out his feelings. Morgan also says that Lee has influenced other Seether songs, as well. In addition, Morgan has also said that "The song is about not allowing yourself to be beaten down by what people say about you and kind of believing in yourself, and ultimately knowing that you'll be better for it".

The song was released to radio in the middle of August 2008 and quickly became one of the most added singles to active rock radio at the time.

== Music video ==
The music video for "Breakdown" premiered on November 12, 2008, on Yahoo! Music. Tony Petrossian, who directed their previous videos for Fake It and Rise Above This, also made this video.

In the video, Jenna Westerbeck approaches Shaun, (who is seated) from behind, and he glances down at her touching him with obvious disdain. She then reaches her arms around and manipulates his head, which becomes a Rubik's Cube at her touch. Throughout the video, Shaun's face changes emotions in each cube, and as the video progresses, different people (including the rest of Seether) appear in the cube, lip-syncing to the background vocals. Towards the end of the bridge, the girl opens up the cube, removing blocks featuring other women. She then finds a block that features only her, and places it in the space for Shaun's eye. She then closes the box, gives it one last spin, and the cube effect disappears. She then walks out of frame as Morgan looks at her with a sense of distaste and disappointment.

This was the first video to feature the band's new lead guitarist Troy McLawhorn.

== Charts ==
=== Weekly charts ===
Weekly chart performance for "Breakdown"
Chart (2009)	Peak position
Canada Hot 100 (Billboard)	98
Canada Rock (Billboard)	4
US Bubbling Under Hot 100 (Billboard)	6
US Alternative Airplay (Billboard)	4
US Mainstream Rock (Billboard)	4

=== Year-end charts ===
Year-end chart performance for "Breakdown"
Chart (2009)	Position
US Hot Rock Songs (Billboard)	17

== Certifications ==
Certifications for "Breakdown"
Region	Certification	Certified units/sales
United States (RIAA)	Gold	500,000^{‡}
^{‡} Sales+streaming figures based on certification alone.
