= Burrito (disambiguation) =

A burrito is a Mexican dish made from a flour tortilla wrapped around a choice of various fillings.

Burrito (little donkey) may also refer to:

- Jorge Daniel Hernández (born 1989), Mexican footballer, nicknamed "Burrito"
- Juan Manuel Martínez (born 1989), Argentine footballer, nicknamed "Burrito"
- Ariel Ortega (born 1974), Argentine footballer, nicknamed "El Burrito"
- Burrito, a character in the animated Disney short The Flying Gauchito
- "Burrito", a name for the Aloysia polystachya plant
- "Burrito", an episode of We Bare Bears
- "Burrito", a song by Seether from the album Karma and Effect
- "Burrito", one of the common names in Spanish for beetles in the genus Rhyephenes
- "Burritos", a song by Sublime from the album Sublime (album)
