= Save Today =

Single by Seether

from the album Isolate and Medicate
- Released: 22 September 2015
- Recorded: 2013–2014
- Genre: Alternative rock; post-grunge
- Length: 4:47
- Label: Bicycle
- Songwriters: Shaun Morgan; Dale Stewart; John Humphrey
- Producer: Brendan O'Brien

Seether singles chronology
"Nobody Praying for Me" (2015)	"Save Today" (2015)	"Let You Down" (2017)

Music video
- "Save Today" on YouTube

"Save Today" is a song by South African rock band Seether. It was released on 22 September 2015 as the fourth single and final single from their sixth studio album Isolate and Medicate.

This song was inspired by Shaun Morgan's late brother Eugene who committed suicide by jumping out of a hotel window. Shaun said "When I began writing it, it was really simple, but I liked what it was inspiring in me as far as emotion and lyrics. I ran with that." "When we got in the studio with (producer) Brendan O'Brien, it became more interesting. He added some parts and made it prettier."

== Charts ==
Chart (2016)	Peak position
Canada Rock (Billboard)	50
US Hot Rock & Alternative Songs (Billboard)	44
US Rock & Alternative Airplay (Billboard)	23
