= Judas Mind =

2024 song by Seether

Single by Seether

from the album The Surface Seems So Far
- Released: July 10, 2024
- Genre: Post-grunge
- Length: 4:34
- Label: Fantasy; Concord
- Songwriter: Shaun Morgan
- Producer: Morgan

Seether singles chronology
"Wasteland" (2021)	"Judas Mind" (2024)	"Lost All Control" (2024)

Music video
- "Judas Mind" on YouTube

"Judas Mind" is a song by South African rock band Seether. It was the first single from their ninth studio album, The Surface Seems So Far. The song topped the Billboard Mainstream Rock Airplay chart in September 2024.

== Background and release ==
In May 2024, before the song's release, frontman Shaun Morgan revealed that "Judas Mind" had been selected as the first single and opening track from the band's upcoming album. Morgan said he expected the single to come to radio in July 2024. He said that the song is about "reaching an understanding that there are bad actors in our lives that are trying to force an outcome for us that we don't see as our destiny", adding that it is about "rising up against people who have a vision for you that you don't share". He also explained that the band had not performed the song before its release because doing so would have spoiled the surprise, adding that he believed "anticipation is a good thing".

"Judas Mind" was released on July 10, 2024, alongside the announcement of the band's ninth album, The Surface Seems So Far. The band performed the song live at the SiriusXM Octane studios on July 30, 2024.

== Composition ==
Consequence described "Judas Mind" as a post-grunge track. Riff Magazine wrote that the song "rises from dark and moody harmonies on the verses to a soaring chorus", while Blabbermouth.net described it as starting softly with a gentle guitar lick before crashing into a slow-burning rocker.

== Reception ==
New Noise Magazine wrote that "Judas Mind" showed that Seether's sound "hasn't changed after all this time". Blabbermouth.net described it as a "deep, dark song" and wrote that it illuminated the band's progression in songwriting from its early days. Spill Magazine identified the song as one of the album's standout tracks.

== Track listing ==
"Judas Mind" single
No.	Title	Length
1.	"Judas Mind" (edit)	4:04
2.	"Judas Mind"	4:34
Total length:		8:38

== Music video ==
The official music video was released on August 14, 2024. It was directed by David Brodsky for My Good Eye Music Visuals and produced by Allison Woest.

== Chart performance ==
It reached number one on the Billboard Mainstream Rock Airplay chart dated September 14, 2024, becoming the band's tenth number-one single on the chart and their fourth consecutive chart-topper since 2020.

== Personnel ==
Credits adapted from Apple Music.

Seether

- Shaun Morgan – guitar, lead vocals
- Dale Stewart – bass guitar
- John Humphrey – drums
- Corey Lowery – backing vocals, guitar

Production and engineering

- Shaun Morgan – producer
- Matt Hyde – mixing engineer, recording engineer
- Corey Lowery – additional engineer
- Ted Jensen – mastering engineer

== Charts ==
=== Weekly charts ===
Weekly chart performance for "Judas Mind"
Chart (2024)	Peak position
Canada Rock (Billboard)	27
Canada Mainstream Rock (Billboard Canada)	9
US Rock & Alternative Airplay (Billboard)	8
US Mainstream Rock Airplay (Billboard)	1

=== Year-end charts ===
Year-end chart performance for "Judas Mind"
Chart (2024)	Position
US Mainstream Rock Airplay (Billboard)	38

Chart (2025)	Position
Canada Mainstream Rock (Billboard)	41
