= Nobody Praying for Me =

Single by Seether

from the album Isolate and Medicate
- Released: 28 April 2015
- Recorded: 2013–2014
- Genre: Alternative rock; post-grunge
- Length: 3:18
- Label: Bicycle
- Songwriters: Shaun Morgan; Dale Stewart; John Humphrey
- Producer: Brendan O'Brien

Seether singles chronology
"Same Damn Life" (2014)	"Nobody Praying for Me" (2015)	"Save Today" (2015)

Music video
- "Nobody Praying for Me" on YouTube

"Nobody Praying for Me" is a song by South African rock band Seether. It was released on 28 April 2015 as the third single from their sixth studio album Isolate and Medicate.

On June 30, Seether released an interactive set of music videos for their single, "Nobody Praying for Me", which centered on perspective when it comes to discrimination and police. Frontman Shaun Morgan said of the video that "our goal in creating this video is for people to educate themselves and make an informed decision on their own, rather than being told by any media outlet saying, this is what you should be thinking, this is what is right. The whole point is to try to shift the way we look at things and to not always leap to our pre-conceived conclusions, which is mostly racially and profile-based, because that's what we get fed all the time. I've been guilty of it too. It's very unfortunate, and it's getting worse instead of better".

The music video was directed by Sherif Higazy.

"Nobody Praying for Me" has garnered criticism due to similarities with the song "Daisy" by Brand New in their syllabic patterns and lyrical formulas. Morgan had previously listed Daisy as one of his five favorite albums and Brand New as one of his favorite bands.

== Charts ==
Chart (2015)	Peak position
Canada Rock (Billboard)	37
US Hot Rock & Alternative Songs (Billboard)	39
US Rock & Alternative Airplay (Billboard)	29

== Certifications ==
Region	Certification	Certified units/sales
United States (RIAA)	Platinum	1,000,000^{‡}
^{‡} Sales+streaming figures based on certification alone.
