= Words as Weapons (Seether song) =

Single by Seether

from the album Isolate and Medicate
- Released: 1 May 2014
- Recorded: 2013–2014
- Genre: Post-grunge; alternative metal
- Length: 4:01
- Label: Bicycle
- Songwriters: Shaun Morgan; Dale Stewart; John Humphrey
- Producer: Brendan O'Brien

Seether singles chronology
"Weak" (2013)	"Words as Weapons" (2014)	"Same Damn Life" (2014)

Music video
- "Words as Weapons" on YouTube

"Words as Weapons" is a song by South African rock band Seether. It was released on 1 May 2014, as the lead single from their sixth studio album Isolate and Medicate.

== Charts ==
=== Weekly charts ===
Weekly chart performance for "Words as Weapons"
Chart (2014)	Peak position
Canada Hot 100 (Billboard)	95
Canada Rock (Billboard)	2
US Hot Rock & Alternative Songs (Billboard)	19
US Rock & Alternative Airplay (Billboard)	12

=== Year-end charts ===
Year-end chart performance for "Words as Weapons"
Chart (2014)	Position
US Hot Rock & Alternative Songs (Billboard)	44
US Rock Airplay (Billboard)	32

== Certifications ==
Certifications for "Words as Weapons"
Region	Certification	Certified units/sales
United States (RIAA)	Platinum	1,000,000^{‡}
^{‡} Sales+streaming figures based on certification alone.
