= Against the Wall (song) =

Single by Seether

Single by Seether

from the album Poison the Parish
- Released: April 8, 2018
- Recorded: 2017
- Studio: Blackbird (Nashville, Tennessee)
- Genre: Hard rock
- Length: 3:50
- Songwriter: Shaun Morgan
- Producer: Shaun Morgan

Seether singles chronology
"Betray and Degrade" (2017)	"Against the Wall" (2018)	"Dangerous" (2020)

Music video
- "Against the Wall" (acoustic version) on YouTube

"Against the Wall" is a song by South African rock band Seether. It was their third single from their seventh album, Poison the Parish. As of August 2018, it had peaked number 19 on the Billboard Mainstream Rock Songs chart.

== Background ==
The song was released as the third single from their sixth studio album Poison the Parish in April 2018. Alternate from the studio and single release, the band also released a separate acoustic recording of the song as well. The acoustic version features frontman Shaun Morgan on vocals and Sevendust's Clint Lowery on acoustic guitar, who has served as a touring member of the band when not active with Sevendust. A music video of the acoustic version of the song was released as well, featuring Morgan and Lowery performing the song in the studio in black and white.

== Themes and composition ==
The song was described as a mid-tempo rock song similar to the work of the Foo Fighters. The studio and single version of the song features a dense, layered production of electric guitars, bass guitar, and drums, while the separate acoustic recording is a more mellow, sparse production of just rough vocals and acoustic guitar.

== Personnel ==
Album/single version

- Shaun Morgan – lead vocals, guitar
- Dale Stewart – bass, backing vocals
- John Humphrey – drums

Acoustic version

- Shaun Morgan – vocals
- Clint Lowery – guitar

== Charts ==
Chart (2018)	Peak position
US Mainstream Rock (Billboard)	19
