= Sno-Core Compilation =

Compilation album by Various Artists
- Released: March 10, 1998
- Recorded: 1997–1998
- Genre: Rapcore; Ska; Punk rock Alternative rock
- Label: Foil
- Producer: Daddy X Donnell Cameron; John Avila; John Feldmann; Guttermouth; Paul Leary; Jay Rifkin; Mark Trombino; The Urge; Michael Vail Blum; Jim Wirt

Various Artists chronology
N/A	Sno-Core Compilation	N/A

Sno-Core Compilation is a compilation album by Foil Records released on March 10, 1998. Inspired by the eponymous tour, this album includes popular names such as the Sublime, Blink 182, and Incubus along with many others.

== Track listing ==
#	Title	Featured Artist	Time
1	Wrong Way	Sublime	2:16
2	Josie	Blink 182	3:20
3	Super Rad!	The Aquabats	3:02
4	Sell Out	Reel Big Fish	3:46
5	Chris Cayton	Goldfinger	3:08
6	Lipstick	Guttermouth	2:51
7	Bulletproof	Voodoo Glow Skulls	2:26
8	New Skin	Incubus	3:55
9	Brainless	The Urge	2:26
10	Suburban Life	Kottonmouth Kings	3:40
