= Wasteland (Seether song) =

2021 song by Seether

Single by Seether

from the album Si Vis Pacem, Para Bellum
- Released: July 27, 2021
- Length: 3:59
- Label: Fantasy; Concord
- Songwriter: Shaun Morgan
- Producer: Morgan

Seether singles chronology
"Bruised and Bloodied" (2020)	"Wasteland" (2021)	"Judas Mind" (2024)

Music video
- "Wasteland" on YouTube

Wasteland – The Purgatory

EP by Seether
- Released: July 30, 2021
- Length: 21:50
- Labels: Fantasy; Concord
- Producer: Shaun Morgan

Seether chronology
Walmart Soundcheck (Walmart Exclusive) (2014)	Wasteland – The Purgatory (2021)	Acoustic Originals (2023)

"Wasteland" is a song by South African rock band Seether. It was the third single from their eighth studio album, Si Vis Pacem, Para Bellum. The song topped the Billboard Mainstream Rock Airplay chart in 2021.

== Release and recording ==
According to Loudwire, the original album version of "Wasteland" received a positive response, leading Seether to push it forward as their new single. Seether announced the companion EP Wasteland – The Purgatory, which was released digitally and on CD on July 30, 2021, and on vinyl on October 22, 2021. The EP includes the original album version of "Wasteland", three new songs, and an alternate stripped-down version of the track. The alternate stripped-down version of the song was released on June 25, 2021, alongside an accompanying music video, ahead of the EP's release. Frontman Shaun Morgan said he was "especially proud" of how the alternate version turned out and "really happy" that people would finally hear it. The official music video was released on August 17, 2021.

== Reception ==
Graham Ray of Distorted Sound described "Wasteland" as an anthemic rock song with a dreamy, emotionally fragile chorus featuring Morgan's harmonies. Travis Lausch of Ultimate Guitar wrote that the song featured Deftones-style chord changes reminiscent of "Hexagram", along with more sophisticated vocal harmonies and instrumental textures. In a 5/10 review of Wasteland – The Purgatory, Sam Lawrie of Dead Press! wrote that "Wasteland" had powerful guitars contrasted with "buttery" vocals.

== Track listing ==
Professional ratings
Wasteland – The Purgatory EP
Review scores
Source	Rating
Dead Press!	5/10

All tracks are written by Shaun Morgan.

"Wasteland (alternate version)" single
No.	Title	Length
1.	"Wasteland" (alternate version)	4:20

"Wasteland – The Purgatory" EP
No.	Title	Length
1.	"Wasteland"	3:59
2.	"What Would You Do?"	4:49
3.	"Will It Ever End"	4:08
4.	"Feast or Famine"	4:33
5.	"Wasteland" (alternate version)	4:20
Total length:		21:50

== Chart performance ==
"Wasteland" reached number one on the Billboard Mainstream Rock Airplay chart dated October 30, 2021, becoming Seether's ninth chart-topper. It became the band's third number-one single from Si Vis Pacem, Para Bellum, marking the first time they had earned three Mainstream Rock Airplay number ones from the same album. The song also gave them their first streak of three consecutive number-one singles.

== Personnel ==
Credits adapted from Apple Music.

Seether

- Shaun Morgan – guitar, lead vocals
- Dale Stewart – bass guitar
- John Humphrey – drums
- Corey Lowery – backing vocals, guitar

Production and engineering

- Shaun Morgan – producer
- Matt Hyde – recording engineer, immersive mixing engineer

== Charts ==
=== Weekly charts ===
Weekly chart performance for "Wasteland"
Chart (2021)	Peak position
US Rock & Alternative Airplay (Billboard)	7
US Mainstream Rock Airplay (Billboard)	1

=== Year-end charts ===
Year-end chart performance for "Wasteland"
Chart (2021)	Position
US Mainstream Rock Airplay (Billboard)	36
