= Dangerous (Seether song) =

Single by Seether

Single by Seether

from the album Si Vis Pacem, Para Bellum
- Released: 24 June 2020
- Recorded: 2019
- Studio: Blackbird (Nashville, Tennessee)
- Genre: Rock; alternative metal
- Length: 3:50
- Songwriter: Shaun Morgan
- Producer: Shaun Morgan

Seether singles chronology
"Against the Wall" (2018)	"Dangerous" (2020)	"Bruised and Bloodied" (2020)

Music video
- "Dangerous" on YouTube

"Dangerous" is a song by South African rock band Seether. It is their first single from their eighth studio album Si Vis Pacem, Para Bellum. It peaked at number one on the Billboard Mainstream Rock Songs chart in October 2020.

== Background ==
The song was first released on 23 June 2020, at the same time as the band's announcement of the name and release date of their eighth studio album, Si Vis Pacem, Para Bellum on 28 August 2020. In just one week in July, the song had accumulated 1.9 million airplay audience impressions, 340,000 streams, and 1,000 downloads in the US. This, coupled with the release of a second promotional song, "Bruised and Bloodied", propelled writer and frontman Shaun Morgan to top the Billboard Hot Hard Rock Songs chart, only the second to top it since its creation in July 2020. In October 2020, the song had peaked at number one on the Billboard Mainstream Rock Songs chart.

== Themes and composition ==
Morgan described the single as different from the rest of the album, but not so drastically different that it would upset the fanbase, and he felt that, along with his respective management and record label, that it would stand out at rock radio and make a good single as a result. The song was described as "despondent" and "beautifully tormented", containing lyrics such as "It's so dangerous, all this blamelessness / and I feel like I've lost all the good I've known." The song was described as "alternative metal anthem" and a slow burn building of a "rock jam".

== Personnel ==
Seether

- Shaun Morgan – vocals, guitar, production
- Dale Stewart – bass
- Corey Lowery – guitar
- John Humphrey – drums, percussion

Additional personnel

- Matt Hyde – engineering, mixing

== Charts ==
Chart (2020)	Peak position
Canada Rock (Billboard)	39
US Hot Rock & Alternative Songs (Billboard)	36
US Rock & Alternative Airplay (Billboard)	8
