= Bruised and Bloodied =

Single by Seether

from the album Si Vis Pacem, Para Bellum
- Released: 20 July 2020
- Recorded: 2020
- Studio: Blackbird (Nashville, Tennessee)
- Genre: Post-grunge; rock
- Length: 3:37

Seether singles chronology
"Dangerous" (2020)	"Bruised and Bloodied" (2020)	"Wasteland" (2021)

Music video
- "Bruised and Bloodied" on YouTube

"Bruised and Bloodied" is a song by South African rock band Seether. It was their second single off of their album Si Vis Pacem, Para Bellum. It topped the Billboard Mainstream Rock Songs chart in 2021.

== Background ==
The song was originally released as a promotional song in July 2020, ahead of the release of the band's eighth studio album Si Vis Pacem, Para Bellum. It was later released as the second single from Si Vis Pacem, Para Bellum. In May 2021, the song topped the Billboard Mainstream Rock Songs chart, the second single in a row to do so, following their prior single, "Dangerous". "Bruised and Bloodied" later topped the chart for a second non-consecutive week as well.

The band released a music video in January 2021; the band found the shooting of the video cathartic, as it was the first time they had been together in the same room with their instruments for a long time due to the COVID-19 pandemic. The band also recorded and released an acoustic version of the song in April 2021.

== Themes and composition ==
Both frontman Shaun Morgan and music publications noted that the song juxtaposed dark, angry lyrics with a more upbeat sound. Wall of Sound described the song as having "that raw edge of grungey rock we all kind of signify 90's rock" but with "a little bit of rock n roll groove...that kind of makes you want to rage amidst the gloom and doom in the world right now".

== Personnel ==
Seether

- Shaun Morgan – vocals, guitar, production
- Dale Stewart – bass
- Corey Lowery – guitar
- John Humphrey – drums, percussion

== Charts ==
=== Weekly charts ===
Weekly chart performance for "Bruised and Bloodied"
Chart (2020–2021)	Peak position
Canada Rock (Billboard)	34
Czech Republic Rock (IFPI)	14
US Rock & Alternative Airplay (Billboard)	9

=== Year-end charts ===
Year-end chart performance for "Bruised and Bloodied"
Chart (2021)	Position
US Rock Airplay (Billboard)	37
