= Rise Above This =

Single by Seether

from the album Finding Beauty in Negative Spaces
- Released: 19 February 2008
- Recorded: 2007
- Genre: Alternative rock
- Length: 3:23
- Label: Wind-up
- Songwriters: Shaun Morgan; Dale Stewart; John Humphrey
- Producer: Howard Benson

Seether singles chronology
"Fake It" (2007)	"Rise Above This" (2008)	"Breakdown" (2008)

Music video
- "Rise Above This" on YouTube

"Rise Above This" is a song by South African rock band Seether. It is the second single from the band's album Finding Beauty in Negative Spaces. It is the sixth track on the album and became the band's second consecutive number-one song on the U.S. Modern Rock chart.

== Background ==
Seether's vocalist Shaun Morgan has stated that the song is about his late brother, Eugene Welgemoed, and was written before his suicide. "Rise Above This" was written to bring Eugene out of a depression. There was also an acoustic version of this song for those who pre-ordered 2011 tour tickets. This version sounds almost the same as the iTunes Originals version, but the iTunes version has an electric guitar in the background and this version is pure acoustic, its length is 3:35. It originally appeared on Rhapsody Originals.

== Music video ==
The music video, directed by Tony Petrossian who also directed the "Fake It" video, debuted on MTV2 and MTV2's website on April 5, 2008. During filming, the band had to try performing three times due to Morgan's difficulty from keeping himself from crying. The video's storyline revolves around a depressed boy who decides to commit suicide by jumping off a building. As he falls, his family, including Morgan, falls with him. Then, during the bridge and the rest of the song, everyone in the family bounces back up. It has a suicide hotline number at the end of the video on television airings in America as well as a picture of Shaun Morgan's younger brother. Shaun's brother, Eugene, actually jumped from the 8th floor window of the hotel that the band was currently staying at while on tour. Eugene was pronounced dead at the scene.

== Charts ==
=== Weekly charts ===
Weekly chart performance for "Rise Above This"
Chart (2008)	Peak position
Canada Hot 100 (Billboard)	58
Canada Rock (Billboard)	1
Czech Republic Rock (IFPI)	11
US Billboard Hot 100	91
US Adult Pop Airplay (Billboard)	18
US Alternative Airplay (Billboard)	1
US Mainstream Rock (Billboard)	2
US Pop Airplay (Billboard)	39
US Pop 100 (Billboard)	71

=== Year-end charts ===
2008 year-end chart performance for "Rise Above This"
Chart (2008)	Position
US Alternative Airplay (Billboard)	6
US Mainstream Rock (Billboard)	6

== Certifications ==
Certifications for "Rise Above This"
Region	Certification	Certified units/sales
United States (RIAA)	Gold	500,000^{‡}
^{‡} Sales+streaming figures based on certification alone.
