= David Ho (artist) =

Chinese-American artist

Personal details
- Born: New Jersey
- Website: www.davidho.com

David G. Ho is a Chinese-American artist.

== Life ==
Ho was born in New Jersey. He moved to Taiwan with his family when he was a child, and moved back to California as a teenager. After getting his undergraduate Sociology degree from UC Berkeley, his ambition in art motivated him to pursue another bachelor's degree in art history and fine arts from San Jose State University.

Ho has created numerous digital art works which were widely recognized and have been featured in competitions and publications including Society of Illustrators Annuals, Spectrum Annuals, Applied Arts Photography and Illustration Annuals, Communication Arts Illustration Annual, Design Graphics, Heavy Metal, Computer Graphics World, DPI Magazine, Society for News Design, Chicago Tribune, MacWorld Expo Digital Gallery, Step-by-Step Illustration Annual, EFX Art and Design, Digital Photo User (UK), Tear Magazine, PEI, Digital Fantasy Painting, Secrets of Award-Winning Digital Artists and more.

In discussion of his work, he has said that digital technology is "a playpen where inhibitions, imagination, madness, fears and angers run wild in a frolicking orgy of psychobliss."

Ho also works as a freelancer illustrator and designer. His clients include Corona Beer, Simon & Schuster, The Source magazine, Chicago Tribune, Interscope Records, Ziff Davis, Acer, Hitachi, IBM, the NRA, Wizards of the Coast, Infected Mushroom, Seether, Penguin Publishing and Soulfly.

David Ho has illustrated cards for the Magic: The Gathering collectible card game.

== Artwork ==
Ho's artwork is grouped into eight series:

- Show Me the Honey Series
- Pig Series
- Interpretation Series
- Candice the Ghost Series
- Block Series
- Contemplation Series
- Classic Series
- Original Paintings

David Ho has also done album artwork for some bands as exampled in Infected Mushroom's Vicious Delicious, Seether's Finding Beauty in Negative Spaces, Cradle of Filth's Godspeed on the Devil's Thunder and Soulfly's Omen.

== Exhibitions ==
- 2008 Group exhibit at World of Wonder Gallery, Los Angeles
- 2007 Group exhibit at Think Space Gallery, Los Angeles
- 2007 Group exhibit at Roq La Rue Gallery, Seattle
- 2006 Group exhibit at Strychnin Gallery, Berlin
- 2006 Awards exhibit at Alternative Pick, NY
- 2006 Solo exhibit at Taipei International Visual Arts Center, Taipei
- 2005 Group exhibit for Random Acts of Art at Loft11, SFO
- 2005 Group exhibit for Spectrum Fantasy Art at Society of Illustrators Museum, NY
- 2005 Group exhibit for MacWorld Expo Digital Art Gallery, SFO
- 2003 Group Halloween exhibit at Echo Gallery, Chicago
- 2003 Solo exhibition at Taipei International Visual Arts Center, Taipei
- 2002 Solo exhibit at the Rocky Mountain Digital Arts Center, Denver
- 2001 Group exhibit for Seybold Digital Art Gallery
- 1999 Group exhibit for Taiwanese Art Evolution, Taiwan

== Awards ==
- MacWorld Expo Digital Art Gallery – Best of Show, Gold & Silver Awards Alternative
- Pick Jury Voted Series – Gold Award
- Spectrum 7 – Gold and Silvers Awards
- International Digital Art Awards (IDAA)
- California Hapi New Year T-shirt Designing Competition champion

== Books ==
- 2007 Illustration: A Theoretical & Contextual Perspective – published by AVA Publishing
- 2007 Secrets of Poser Experts – published by Thomson Course Technology
- 2004 Digital Art for the 21st Century – published by Harper Design International
- 2002 Secrets of Award Winning Digital Artists – published by Wiley Publishing
- 2002 Shadow Maker: The Digital Art of David Ho – published by Abaya Studios
- 2002 Digital Fantasy Painting – published by Watson Guptill
- 1999 The Digital Illustrations of David Ho – published by SunGood Books

== Articles ==
- Digital ImageMaker presents David Ho
- Shadow Maker: The Digital Art of David Ho by David Ho
- The Art of David Ho
