= Same Damn Life =

Single by Seether

from the album Isolate and Medicate
- Released: 16 September 2014
- Recorded: 2013–2014
- Genre: Hard rock
- Length: 3:20
- Label: Bicycle
- Songwriters: Shaun Morgan; Dale Stewart; John Humphrey
- Producer: Brendan O'Brien

Seether singles chronology
"Words as Weapons" (2014)	"Same Damn Life" (2014)	"Nobody Praying for Me" (2015)

Music video
- "Same Damn Life" on YouTube

"Same Damn Life" is a song by South African rock band Seether. It was released on 16 September 2014 as the second single from their sixth studio album Isolate and Medicate.

== Charts ==
=== Weekly charts ===
Weekly chart performance for "Same Damn Life"
Chart (2014–2015)	Peak position
Canada Rock (Billboard)	2
US Hot Rock & Alternative Songs (Billboard)	30
US Rock & Alternative Airplay (Billboard)	16

=== Year-end charts ===
Year-end chart performance for "Same Damn Life"
Chart (2015)	Position
US Hot Rock Songs (Billboard)	80

== Certifications ==
Certifications for "Same Damn Life"
Region	Certification	Certified units/sales
United States (RIAA)	Gold	500,000^{‡}
^{‡} Sales+streaming figures based on certification alone.
