= Let You Down (Seether song) =

Single by Seether

from the album Poison the Parish
- Released: February 23, 2017
- Recorded: 2016
- Studio: Blackbird (Nashville, Tennessee)
- Genre: Alternative metal
- Length: 4:10
- Songwriter: Shaun Morgan
- Producer: Shaun Morgan

Seether singles chronology
"Save Today" (2015)	"Let You Down" (2017)	"Betray and Degrade" (2017)

Music video
- "Let You Down" on YouTube

"Let You Down" is a song by South African rock band Seether. It is the first single from their seventh studio album Poison the Parish. It peaked at number one on the Billboard Mainstream Rock Songs chart in 2017.

== Background ==
The song was first revealed on 23 February 2017, the same day the band announced their seventh album – Poison the Parish. A music video was released on the same day of the song's release, which features many ominous, masked and cloaked carnival-themed people roaming through an open field. The footage cuts back and forth between the figures and the band performing in a dark, secluded cabin.

== Composition and themes ==
The track was self-produced by band frontman and lead vocalist Shaun Morgan, and was meant to represent the band's return to a heavier rock sound found in their earlier albums. Loudwire described the chorus as being "a little bit of an emotional reprieve" to the song's verses, calling it "sonically uplifting, but lyrically despondent." A few publications noted a similarity in the guitar riff and chord progression of the song to Chevelle's 2014 single "Take Out the Gunman", Live's 1997 single "Lakini's Juice" and Tool's 1996 single "Stinkfist".

== Personnel ==
- Shaun Morgan – lead vocals, guitar
- Dale Stewart – bass
- John Humphrey – drums

== Charts ==
=== Weekly charts ===
Weekly chart performance for "Let You Down"
Chart (2017)	Peak position
Canada Rock (Billboard)	37
Czech Republic Rock (IFPI)	6
US Hot Rock & Alternative Songs (Billboard)	25
US Rock & Alternative Airplay (Billboard)	8

=== Year-end charts ===
Year-end chart performance for "Let You Down"
Chart (2017)	Position
US Hot Rock Songs (Billboard)	92
US Rock Airplay (Billboard)	46
