= Betray and Degrade =

Single by Seether

from the album Poison the Parish
- Released: August 9, 2017
- Recorded: 2016
- Studio: Blackbird (Nashville, Tennessee)
- Genre: Hard rock
- Length: 4:04
- Songwriter: Shaun Morgan
- Producer: Shaun Morgan

Seether singles chronology
"Let You Down" (2017)	"Betray and Degrade" (2017)	"Against the Wall" (2018)

Music video
- "Betray and Degrade" on YouTube

"Betray and Degrade" is a song by South African rock band Seether. It is the second single off of their studio album Poison the Parish. It peaked at number two on the Billboard Mainstream Rock Songs chart in December 2017.

== Background ==
The song was released as the second single, after "Let You Down", from the band's seventh studio album, Poison the Parish. The song's music video was released on August 10, 2017. Its music video was noted for its change in direction from usual - while typically serious, the video was described as "comedic" and "carefree". The video features the band - vocalist and guitarist Shaun Morgan, bassist Dale Stewart, touring guitarist Clint Lowery and drummer John Humphrey - performing in a lighthearted manner, with huge grins in peaceful backdrops like forests and beaches. As the song progresses, the scenery darkens, while the band members begin to look menacing, covered in dirt and blood, and zombie-fied. Also, the band smashed their instruments.

== Themes and composition ==
The song was self-produced by Morgan. The song uses quiet-loud dynamics, going from "bouncy" vibes to heavier, more aggressive tones.

== Reception ==
The song was generally well received by critics. Loudwire named the song the 23rd best hard rock song of 2017.

== Personnel ==
- Shaun Morgan – lead vocals, backing vocals, guitars
- Dale Stewart – bass
- John Humphrey – drums

== Charts ==
Chart (2017)	Peak position
Czech Republic Rock (IFPI)	3
US Rock & Alternative Airplay (Billboard)	16
US Hot Rock & Alternative Songs (Billboard)	29
