= Poison the Parish =

Studio album by Seether
- Released: 12 May 2017
- Recorded: 2016
- Studios: Blackbird (Nashville, Tennessee)
- Genres: Post-grunge; alternative metal; hard rock
- Length: 47:26
- Labels: Canine Riot; Bicycle; Spinefarm; Fantasy
- Producer: Shaun Morgan

Seether chronology
Isolate and Medicate (2014)	Poison the Parish (2017)	Si Vis Pacem, Para Bellum (2020)

Singles from Poison the Parish
- 1. "Let You Down" Released: 23 February 2017; 2. "Betray and Degrade" Released: 9 August 2017; 3. "Against the Wall" Released: 8 April 2018

Poison the Parish is the seventh studio album by South African rock band Seether. It was released on 12 May 2017. It is the band's first album to feature a new band logo on the cover. The first single, "Let You Down" was released on 23 February 2017. On 23 March 2017, the band released a new track titled "Stoke the Fire". On 13 April 2017, "Nothing Left" was released. On 5 May 2017, "Count Me Out" was released. On 9 August 2017, the album's second single, "Betray and Degrade" was released. On 8 April 2018, the album's third single, "Against the Wall", was released.

== Themes and composition ==
In response to being asked about the album's "heavier" direction than prior releases, frontman Shaun Morgan said of the album's musical direction:

...a lot of the time, we were dealing with the record company that wanted the band to...sound slightly more radio-friendly, in terms of possibly pushing us toward an alternative direction. Alternative used to be something that was the category [we were] in. That's no longer the case. Now, it's more that guitars are less of a player in the music, and it's more Imagine Dragons and Lorde and stuff like that. We don't fit the alternative category anymore. That was something that the [record] label wanted us quite desperately to try [to be a part of], and I think the producers steered us in that direction as well. It all makes sense, in some respect. They had a plan that we just weren't privy to. The whole point, for me, was to reclaim the fact that we're a rock band and it's what we'll always be, and until the alternative label shifts back to the kind of rock bands that have guitar and vocals, that's just what we'll be.

He further expanded that the album's emphasis would be on "heavy guitars" and "loud drums", but not "...a lot of percussion in the background and keyboard parts and tons of strings in different places. There's a time and place for all those things, but I didn't feel like this was that time or place."

== Reception ==
Professional ratings
Review scores
Source	Rating
AllMusic	3.5/5 stars
Rock Sins	8.5/10

The album was generally well received, with critics praising the album's quality despite a perceived lack of originality. AllMusic was generally positive about the album, concluding that "Poison the Parish doesn't deviate too far from the structural blueprints of prior outings, but it's hardly the work of a band just going through the motions. By attaining autonomy, Seether seems to have rediscovered their vitality." Similarly, Team Rock felt that the album was "a competent radio rock record that's a little too long and ends on a mediocre ballad. It won't be the last album of 2017 to fit that description, but it will likely be one of the better ones."

== Track listing ==
All tracks are written by Shaun Morgan.

No.	Title	Length
1.	"Stoke the Fire"	3:44
2.	"Betray and Degrade"	4:04
3.	"Something Else"	3:42
4.	"I'll Survive"	3:38
5.	"Let You Down"	4:10
6.	"Against the Wall"	3:50
7.	"Let Me Heal"	3:52
8.	"Saviours"	3:22
9.	"Nothing Left"	3:36
10.	"Count Me Out"	3:50
11.	"Emotionless"	5:21
12.	"Sell My Soul"	4:17
Total length:		47:26

Bonus tracks
No.	Title	Length
13.	"Feels Like Dying"	4:03
14.	"Misunderstood"	3:47
15.	"Take a Minute"	4:29
Total length:		59:45

== Personnel ==
Credits adapted from the album's liner notes.

Seether

- Shaun Morgan – lead vocals, guitar
- Dale Stewart – bass, backing vocals
- John Humphrey – drums, percussion

Production

- Shaun Morgan – producer
- Matt Hyde – engineer, mixing
- Jordan Griffin – assistant engineer
- Sean Badum – assistant engineer
- Tom Baker – mastering

== Charts ==
Chart (2017)	Peak position
Australian Albums (ARIA)	29
Austrian Albums (Ö3 Austria)	23
Belgian Albums (Ultratop Flanders)	130
Canadian Albums (Billboard)	25
German Albums (Offizielle Top 100)	26
New Zealand Heatseekers Albums (RMNZ)	3
Scottish Albums (Official Charts)	34
Swiss Albums (Schweizer Hitparade)	16
UK Albums (Official Charts)	72
UK Rock & Metal Albums (Official Charts)	2
US Billboard 200	14
US Top Album Sales (Billboard)	8
US Top Alternative Albums (Billboard)	2
US Top Hard Rock Albums (Billboard)	1
US Top Rock Albums (Billboard)	3
US Indie Store Album Sales (Billboard)	11
