= Remedy (Seether song) =

Single by Seether

from the album Karma and Effect
- B-side: "Let Me Go"
- Released: 11 April 2005
- Genre: Alternative metal; nu metal
- Length: 3:27
- Label: Wind-up
- Songwriter: Shaun Morgan
- Producer: Bob Marlette

Seether singles chronology
"Broken" (2004)	"Remedy" (2005)	"Truth" (2005)

Music video
- "Remedy" on YouTube

"Remedy" is a song by South African rock band Seether. It is the second track on their album Karma and Effect, and was released as the album's lead single. It became their first single to hit the top spot on the Billboard Hot Mainstream Rock Tracks chart, dropping and regaining the spot for a total of eight weeks at number one and spent 52 weeks on the same chart.

== Music video ==
The music video, directed by Dean Karr, features the band playing on the deck of a ship that appears to have run aground with fans who were selected via a contest on the band's website to appear in the shallow water below. Interspersed are shots of singer Shaun Morgan dressed up as an evil carnival barker taking a group of people on "the world's most terrifying ride". At the end of the video, the people that boarded the boat emerge from a tunnel, transformed into skeletons.

== Track listing ==
No.	Title	Length
1.	"Remedy"	3:31
2.	"Let Me Go"	3:24
3.	"Remedy" (live acoustic)	4:22
4.	"Remedy" (music video)	3:27

== Charts ==
=== Weekly charts ===
Weekly chart performance for "Remedy"
Chart (2005–2006)	Peak position
Australia (ARIA)	42
Canada Rock Top 30 (Radio & Records)	9
US Billboard Hot 100	70
US Alternative Airplay (Billboard)	5
US Mainstream Rock (Billboard)	1
US Pop 100 (Billboard)	73

=== Year-end charts ===
2005 year-end chart performance for "Remedy"
Chart (2005)	Position
US Mainstream Rock Tracks (Billboard)	2
US Modern Rock Tracks (Billboard)	9

2006 year-end chart performance for "Remedy"
Chart (2006)	Position
US Mainstream Rock Songs (Billboard)	28

== Certifications ==
Certifications for "Remedy"
Region	Certification	Certified units/sales
New Zealand (RMNZ)	Platinum	30,000^{‡}
United States (RIAA)	2× Platinum	2,000,000^{‡}
^{‡} Sales+streaming figures based on certification alone.
