= The Gift (Seether song) =

Single by Seether

from the album Karma and Effect
- Released: 28 February 2006
- Genre: Post-grunge
- Length: 5:34
- Label: Wind-up
- Songwriter: Shaun Morgan
- Producer: Bob Marlette

Seether singles chronology
"Truth" (2005)	"The Gift" (2006)	"Fake It" (2007)

Music video
- "The Gift" on YouTube

"The Gift" is a song by South African rock band Seether. It is the fourth track and third and final single off their album Karma and Effect.

== Music video ==
The music video was written and directed by Meiert Avis. The video is about a man who kills a young girl in a car crash in Southern Mexico. Each year, on The Day of the Dead, he visits the cross at the side of the road at the place where she died, and spends the night there. Meanwhile, the ghost of a little girl goes into town with a Curandero to visit her father and sister, who the man had been dating. As he is driving to the cross, he sees the ghost walking on the side of the road. The ghost of the little girl leaves candy skulls, representing her forgiveness, on the man's bed. The "Gift" is the life he took, and the forgiveness she gives him.

The video is punctuated with shots of the band playing the song in a darkened room, illuminated only by bare hanging lightbulbs.

The song has been described by lead singer, Shaun Morgan, as being inspired by his daughter.

== Charts ==
Chart (2006)	Peak position
Canada Rock (Billboard)	12
Czech Republic Rock (IFPI)	17
US Mainstream Rock Airplay (Billboard)	8
US Alternative Airplay (Billboard)	29
