= Isolate and Medicate =

Studio album by Seether
- Released: 1 July 2014
- Recorded: 2013–2014
- Genres: Post-grunge; hard rock; alternative metal; alternative rock
- Length: 38:48 (standard edition); 55:02 (deluxe edition)
- Labels: Bicycle; Concord; Spinefarm
- Producer: Brendan O'Brien

Seether chronology
Holding Onto Strings Better Left to Fray (2011)	Isolate and Medicate (2014)	Poison the Parish (2017)

Singles from Isolate and Medicate
- 1. "Words as Weapons" Released: 1 May 2014; 2. "Same Damn Life" Released: 16 September 2014; 3. "Nobody Praying for Me" Released: 28 April 2015; 4. "Save Today" Released: 22 September 2015

Isolate and Medicate (stylised as isolate and medicate) is the sixth studio album by South African rock band Seether. It was released on 1 July 2014 by The Bicycle Music Company, in association with Concord Music Group and Spinefarm Records. It is the first Seether album to be released on a vinyl LP.

== Release and promotion ==
On 1 May 2014, the band released the first single from the album, "Words as Weapons". "Same Damn Life" was released on 16 September 2014 as the album's second single. "Nobody Praying for Me" was sent to US Active Rock stations on 28 April 2015 as the third single off of the album. "Save Today" was sent to US Active Rock stations on 22 September 2015 as the fourth single off of the album.

== Critical reception ==
Professional ratings
Review scores
Source	Rating
AllMusic	3.5/5 stars
Loudwire	4.5/5 stars
Kill Your Stereo	81/100
Already Heard	4/5 stars
Hit the Floor	3.5/5 stars
The Music	2.5/5 stars
MusicReviewRadar	3.5/5 stars
Blabbermouth.net	3.5/5 stars

Loudwire wrote "the group offers one of their finest albums to date by digging deep and expressing themselves in a variety of ways". AllMusic said "Seether gravitate toward the melodic, a shift apparent in both the verses and the riffs, although there's still a tendency to grind out thick neo-grunge guitar workouts both slow ("My Disaster") and fast ("Suffer It All")". Blabbermouth.net wrote "Isolate and Medicate shows Seether trying to roll after more than a decade and a half in the life, but it presents a case of identity crisis, since it's apparent these guys are capable of writing pretty kickass stuff if left to their own devices."

== Track listing ==
All lyrics are written by Shaun Morgan, except where noted; all music is composed by Seether, except where noted.

Standard edition
No.	Title	Length
1.	"See You at the Bottom"	3:38
2.	"Same Damn Life"	3:20
3.	"Words as Weapons"	4:01
4.	"My Disaster"	4:34
5.	"Crash"	3:41
6.	"Suffer It All"	3:55
7.	"Watch Me Drown"	3:10
8.	"Nobody Praying for Me"	3:19
9.	"Keep the Dogs at Bay"	4:26
10.	"Save Today"	4:48
Total length:		38:48

Deluxe edition bonus tracks
No.	Title	Writer(s)	Length
11.	"Turn Around"		4:14
12.	"Burn the World"		3:38
13.	"Goodbye Tonight" (with Van Coke Kartel) (English)	Morgan; Francois Badenhorst; Jedd Kossew; Wynand Myburgh; Jason Oosthuizen; Jon Savage	3:22
14.	"Weak" (from Seether: 2002-2013)		3:48
Total length:			55:02

Notes

- "Same Damn Life" contains an interpolation of "Chariot", written by Paul Mauriat, Franck Pourcel, Jacques Plante, and Raymond Lefèvre.

== Personnel ==
Credits adapted from the album's liner notes.

Seether

- Shaun Morgan – lead vocals, guitar
- Dale Stewart – bass, backing vocals
- John Humphrey – drums, percussion

Production

- Brendan O'Brien – producer and mixing (1–12, 14)
- Tom Syrowski – engineer (1–12)
- Miguel Lara – second engineer (1–12)
- Billy Joe Bowers – mastering (1–12)
- Jon Savage – producer (13)
- Brendan Rusti Rossouw – engineer (13)
- Will Brierre – mixing (13)
- Tom Syrowski – engineer (14)
- Kyle Stevens – assistant engineer (14)
- Bill Rahko – assistant engineer (14)
- Ted Jensen – mastering (14)

== Charts ==
Chart (2014)	Peak position
Austrian Albums (Ö3 Austria)	45
Australian Albums (ARIA)	43
Canadian Albums (Billboard)	6
New Zealand Albums (RMNZ)	24
German Albums (Offizielle Top 100)	32
Scottish Albums (Official Charts)	70
Swiss Albums (Schweizer Hitparade)	33
UK Albums (Official Charts)	78
UK Rock & Metal Albums (Official Charts)	5
UK Album Downloads (Official Charts)	92
US Billboard 200	4
US Top Rock Albums (Billboard)	1
US Top Alternative Albums (Billboard)	1
US Top Hard Rock Albums (Billboard)	1

=== Year-end charts ===
Chart (2014)	Position
US Billboard Alternative Albums	31
US Billboard Hard Rock Albums	15
US Billboard Rock Albums	48

== Certifications ==
Region	Certification	Certified units/sales
United States (RIAA)	Gold	500,000^{‡}
^{‡} Sales+streaming figures based on certification alone.

== Release history ==
Region	Date
Australia	27 June 2014
United Kingdom	30 June 2014
United States	1 July 2014
Germany	4 July 2014
