= The Surface Seems So Far =

2024 studio album by Seether

Studio album by Seether
- Released: 20 September 2024
- Recorded: Late 2023
- Studios: Blackbird (Nashville, Tennessee); Dark Horse
- Genres: Alternative metal; post-grunge
- Length: 47:06
- Label: Fantasy
- Producer: Shaun Morgan

Seether chronology
Si Vis Pacem, Para Bellum (2020)	The Surface Seems So Far (2024)	Beneath the Surface (2026)

Singles from The Surface Seems So Far
- 1. "Judas Mind" Released: 10 July 2024; 2. "Illusion" Released: 23 August 2024; 3. "Walls Come Down" Released: 19 November 2024; 4. "Lost All Control" Released: 26 September 2025

Professional ratings
Review scores
Source	Rating
Blabbermouth.net	8/10
New Noise Magazine	5/5 stars
Riff Magazine	7/10
Spill Magazine	8/10
Sputnikmusic	3.3/5

The Surface Seems So Far is the ninth studio album by South African rock band Seether. It was released on 20 September 2024 through Fantasy Records, It is the follow up to the band's eighth studio album, Si Vis Pacem, Para Bellum (2020). According to vocalist/rhythm guitarist Shaun Morgan, it is the band's heaviest and most intense album, and it was written during the COVID-19 pandemic lockdown. It is also the band's first album to feature no acoustic songs.

== Promotion ==
The first single from the album titled "Judas Mind" was released on 10 July 2024. The second single, titled "Illusion", was released on 23 August 2024.

== Track listing ==
All tracks are written by Shaun Morgan.

The Surface Seems So Far track listing
No.	Title	Length
1.	"Judas Mind"	4:34
2.	"Illusion"	4:02
3.	"Beneath the Veil"	3:43
4.	"Semblance of Me"	4:16
5.	"Walls Come Down"	4:26
6.	"Try to Heal"	4:40
7.	"Paint the World"	4:19
8.	"Same Mistakes"	4:00
9.	"Lost All Control"	4:33
10.	"Dead on the Vine"	4:32
11.	"Regret"	4:01
Total length:		47:06

== Personnel ==
Seether

- Shaun Morgan – lead vocals, rhythm guitar
- Corey Lowery – lead guitar, backing vocals
- Dale Stewart – bass
- John Humphrey – drums

Additional contributors

- Shaun Morgan – production, engineering
- Corey Lowery – engineering assistance
- Matt Hyde – mixing, engineering
- Ted Jensen – mastering
- Shawn Coss – cover art
- Florian Mihr – package design

== Charts ==
Chart performance for The Surface Seems So Far
Chart (2024)	Peak position
French Rock & Metal Albums (SNEP)	53
German Albums (Offizielle Top 100)	99
Scottish Albums (Official Charts)	73
Swiss Albums (Schweizer Hitparade)	58
UK Album Downloads (Official Charts)	45
UK Rock & Metal Albums (Official Charts)	6
US Billboard 200	138
US Independent Albums (Billboard)	24
US Top Rock & Alternative Albums (Billboard)	31
