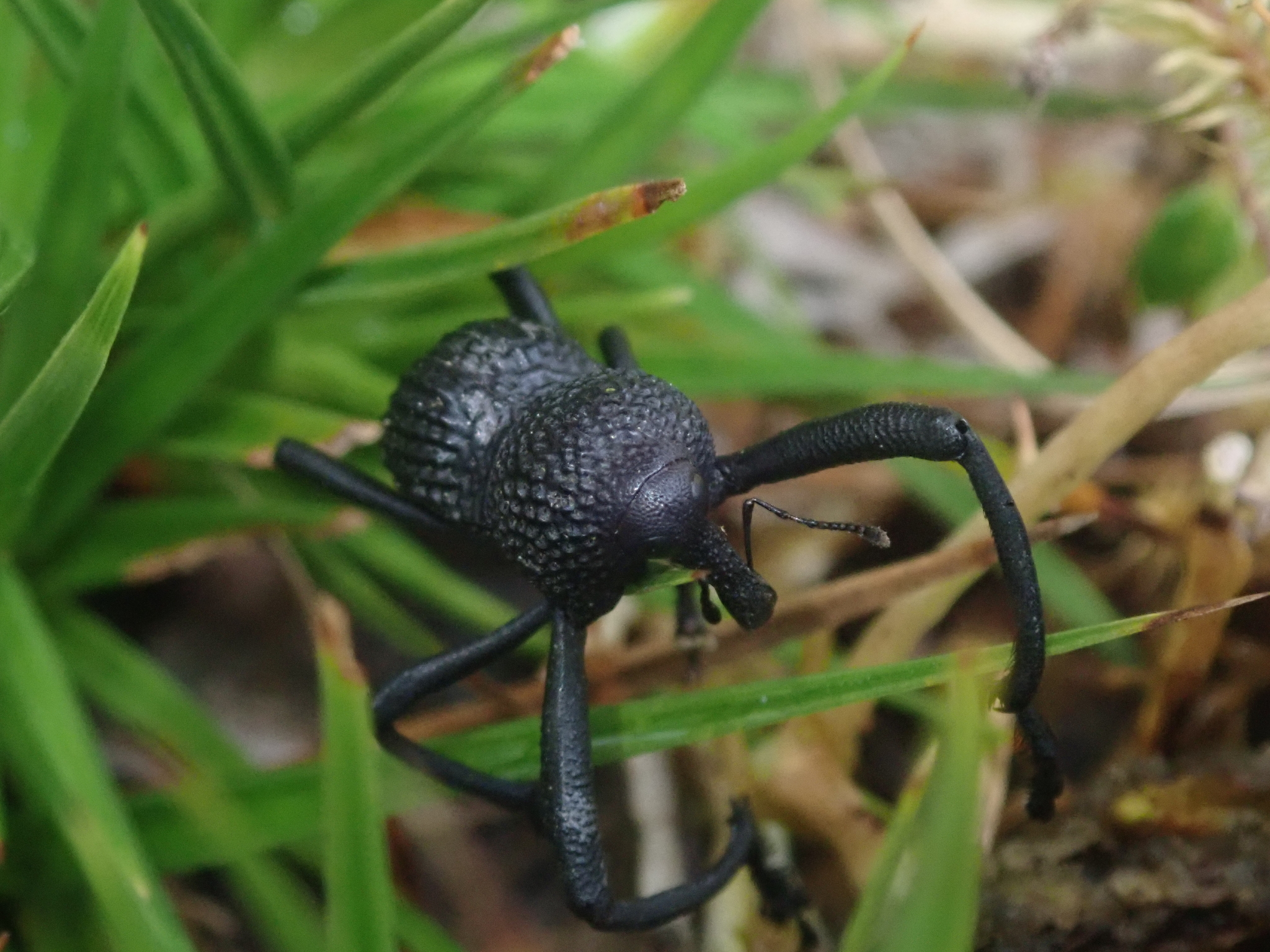
- Rhyephenes maillei photographed in Chiloe, Chile

Scientific classification
- Domain: Eukaryota
- Kingdom: Animalia
- Phylum: Arthropoda
- Class: Insecta
- Order: Coleoptera
- Suborder: Polyphaga
- Infraorder: Cucujiformia
- Family: Curculionidae
- Genus: Rhyephenes; Schönherr, 1837

= Rhyephenes =

Genus of beetles in South America

Rhyephenes is a genus of beetles in the family Curculionidae (true weevils) native to Chile and neighboring mountains in the Argentine Andes, ranging from the Coquimbo Region in the north to Magallanes Region in the south. In Spanish it is known by the common names burrito and caballito de palo.

== Description ==
Its elytra are fused, hence it cannot fly. The body is mostly black, with most species showing two white or orange spots on the elytra, and some showing a reddish hue in the thorax and legs. They grow up to 1.5 cm (0.59 in) long, the females slightly bigger than the males.

== Taxonomy ==
Rhyephenes contains the following species:

- Rhyephenes gayi
- Rhyephenes maillei
- Rhyephenes squamiger
- Rhyephenes humeralis
- Rhyephenes lateralis
- Rhyephenes clathratus
- Rhyephenes goureaui
