= Fake It (Seether song) =

2007 single by Seether

Single by Seether

from the album Finding Beauty in Negative Spaces
- Released: 28 August 2007
- Recorded: 2006–2007
- Length: 3:16
- Label: Wind-up
- Songwriters: Shaun Morgan; Dale Stewart; John Humphrey
- Producer: Howard Benson

Seether singles chronology
"The Gift" (2006)	"Fake It" (2007)	"Rise Above This" (2008)

Music video
- "Fake It" on YouTube

"Fake It" is a song by the South African rock band Seether. It is the first single from the band's album Finding Beauty in Negative Spaces. The single rose to number one on both the US Billboard Mainstream Rock and Modern Rock charts. It also reached number 56 on the Billboard Hot 100, the second-highest peak of their singles, after "Broken", which reached number 20. Worldwide, "Fake It" entered the top 20 in the Czech Republic and New Zealand. The original version of the song was first recorded in singer Shaun Morgan's bedroom and was an iTunes exclusive bonus track named "Quirk," included with pre-orders of Finding Beauty in Negative Spaces.

In May 2021, for the 40th anniversary of the Mainstream Rock chart, Billboard ranked "Fake It" at number 10 on its list of the 100 most successful songs in the chart's history; in September 2023, the magazine ranked the song at number 93 on a similar retrospective list for the 35th anniversary of the Modern Rock chart (which by then had been renamed to Alternative Airplay).

== Music video ==
The music video, which was directed by Tony Petrossian, debuted on Seether's website as part of a "worldwide fan premiere" on 23 October 2007, the same day the album was released. It shows Shaun Morgan filming a music video on a plane set, with women dancing seductively around him. It then goes on to show the band playing in a snowy clearing and an industrial looking arena surrounded by fans. Each setting is then inundated with various parts of the others, such as having the scantily clad models from the plane dance through the snowy clearing, revealing all the various music video tropes to be faked in some way, through the use of props, bluescreen, or computer manipulation, reflecting the theme of the lyrics.

== Usage in media ==
"Fake It" was announced to be the official theme song of the 2008 WWE No Way Out pay-per-view event that took place on 17 February 2008 in Las Vegas, Nevada. It also appears on the soundtrack in the video game Burnout Paradise. On 8 June 2010, it was released in the Rock Band Network for Rock Band 2, but was later released as official Rock Band 4 DLC on 19 July 2018. It was also featured as Rocksmith 2014 DLC on 10 February 2015 in the Seether song pack.

== Personnel ==
- Shaun Morgan – lead vocals, guitar
- Dale Stewart – bass, backing vocals
- John Humphrey – drums, percussion

== Charts ==
=== Weekly charts ===
Weekly chart performance for "Fake It"
Chart (2007–2008)	Peak position
Australia (ARIA)	49
Canada Hot 100 (Billboard)	38
Canada Rock (Billboard)	1
Czech Republic Rock (IFPI)	6
New Zealand (Recorded Music NZ)	14
US Billboard Hot 100	56
US Alternative Airplay (Billboard)	1
US Mainstream Rock (Billboard)	1
US Pop 100 (Billboard)	59

=== Year-end charts ===
2007 year-end chart performance for "Fake It"
Chart (2007)	Position
US Mainstream Rock (Billboard)	27

2008 year-end chart performance for "Fake It"
Chart (2008)	Position
US Mainstream Rock (Billboard)	4
US Modern Rock (Billboard)	5

== Certifications ==
Certifications for "Fake It"
Region	Certification	Certified units/sales
New Zealand (RMNZ)	2× Platinum	60,000^{‡}
United Kingdom (BPI)	Silver	200,000^{‡}
United States (RIAA)	3× Platinum	3,000,000^{‡}
^{‡} Sales+streaming figures based on certification alone.
