= Truth (Seether song) =

Single by Seether

from the album Karma and Effect
- Released: 6 September 2005
- Genre: Alternative metal; nu metal; post-grunge
- Length: 3:50
- Label: Wind-up
- Songwriter: Shaun Morgan
- Producer: Bob Marlette

Seether singles chronology
"Remedy" (2005)	"Truth" (2005)	"The Gift" (2006)

Music video
- "Truth" on YouTube

"Truth" is a 2005 song by South African rock band Seether. It is the third track and second single from their album Karma and Effect.

The music video for this song was directed by Dean Karr, who had also directed the video for their previous single "Remedy", and features frontman Shaun Morgan disguised as a ring announcer, in a boxing ring, for a total of three fights: Round 1: Santa Claus vs. the New Years Baby (who is played by Martin Klebba), Round 2: Mardi Gras Woman vs. the Pumpkin King, and for the Main event, The Easter Bunny vs. Uncle Sam, who ended up portrayed by UFC martial artist, Tito Ortiz. The video also features and closes with the group performing inside of an abandoned warehouse.

== Charts ==
Chart (2005)	Peak position
Canada Rock Top 30 (Radio & Records)	17
U.S. Bubbling Under Hot 100 (Billboard)	23
U.S. Billboard Hot Mainstream Rock Tracks	8
U.S. Billboard Hot Modern Rock Tracks	25
