= Si Vis Pacem, Para Bellum (album) =

Studio album by Seether
- Released: 28 August 2020
- Recorded: December 2019 – January 2020
- Studios: Blackbird (Nashville, Tennessee)
- Genres: Hard rock; post-grunge; alternative metal; alternative rock
- Length: 51:34
- Labels: Fantasy; Concord
- Producer: Shaun Morgan

Seether chronology
| Poison the Parish (2017) | Si Vis Pacem, Para Bellum (2020) | The Surface Seems So Far (2024) |

Singles from Si Vis Pacem, Para Bellum
- 1. "Dangerous" Released: 24 June 2020; 2. "Bruised and Bloodied" Released: 17 July 2020; 3. "Wasteland" Released: 27 July, 2021

Professional ratings
Review scores
| Source | Rating |
|---|---|
| Distorted Sound | 7/10 |
| Kerrang! | 2/5 |
| Spill Magazine | 4/5 spills |
| Sputnikmusic | 4/5 |
| Ultimate Guitar | 7.3/10 |

Si Vis Pacem, Para Bellum (Latin pronunciation: [siː wiːs ˈpaːkẽː ˈpara ˈbɛllũː]; English: "If You Want Peace, Prepare for War") is the eighth studio album by South African rock band Seether. It was released on 28 August 2020 through Fantasy Records and was produced by lead vocalist Shaun Morgan. The album's first single, "Dangerous", was released ahead of the album in June 2020, as well as "Bruised and Bloodied" in July and "Beg" in August. A deluxe edition was released on 1 July 2022.

== Background and promotion ==
In June 2019, John Humphrey revealed that recording had commenced for their upcoming eighth studio album, with frontman Shaun Morgan creating demos and sharing them with band members. On 24 June 2020, the band announced the album itself set for release on 28 August 2020 through Fantasy Records. They also released the first single of the album, "Dangerous". Translating to "If You Want Peace, Prepare for War", the album features 13 new tracks, and was produced by Morgan himself in Nashville, Tennessee from December 2019 to January 2020. On 17 July, the band released the second single, "Bruised and Bloodied". On 14 August, two weeks before the album release, the band released a third song "Beg".

== Composition and themes ==
Morgan explained that the album's sound was influenced by late 1990s alternative rock, specifically A Perfect Circle and Deftones, which he had been listening to heavily in recent years. The album combines the guitar riffs commonly found in 1990s rock with the atmospheric sounds found in A Perfect Circle's music. Morgan also aimed to move away from the standard "verse-pre-chorus-chorus" song structure commonly found in mainstream music.

== Track listing ==
All tracks are written by Shaun Morgan

Si Vis Pacem, Para Bellum track listing
| No. | Title | Length |
|---|---|---|
| 1. | "Dead and Done" | 3:27 |
| 2. | "Bruised and Bloodied" | 3:37 |
| 3. | "Wasteland" | 3:59 |
| 4. | "Dangerous" | 3:49 |
| 5. | "Liar" | 4:18 |
| 6. | "Can't Go Wrong" | 3:47 |
| 7. | "Buried in the Sand" | 4:17 |
| 8. | "Let It Go" | 4:08 |
| 9. | "Failure" | 3:51 |
| 10. | "Beg" | 3:40 |
| 11. | "Drift Away" | 4:52 |
| 12. | "Pride Before the Fall" | 4:12 |
| 13. | "Written in Stone" | 3:37 |
| Total length: | | 51:34 |

Walmart Exclusive bonus tracks
| No. | Title | Length |
|---|---|---|
| 14. | "Let You Down" (live) | 4:24 |
| 15. | "Remedy" (live) | 7:35 |
| Total length: | | 63:33 |

Deluxe Edition bonus tracks
| No. | Title | Length |
|---|---|---|
| 14. | "What Would You Do?" | 4:49 |
| 15. | "Will It Ever End?" | 4:09 |
| 16. | "Feast or Famine" | 4:33 |
| 17. | "Wasteland" (alternate version) | 4:20 |
| 18. | "Leech" | 3:50 |
| 19. | "Deliver Me" | 3:47 |
| 20. | "On My Way" | 4:08 |
| 21. | "Leave Me Be" | 3:34 |
| 22. | "Crossed the Line" | 4:00 |
| Total length: | | 88:44 |

Notes

- Tracks 14 to 17 are originally from Wasteland – The Purgatory EP.

== Personnel ==
Credits adapted from AllMusic and the album's liner notes.

Seether

- Shaun Morgan – lead vocals, rhythm guitar
- Corey Lowery – lead guitar, backing vocals
- Dale Stewart – bass, backing vocals
- John Humphrey – drums

Additional personnel

- Shaun Morgan – production
- Corey Lowery – engineering
- Matt Hyde – engineering, mixing
- Ted Jensen – mastering
- Matt Marshall – A&R
- Shawn Coss – artwork
- Florian Mihr – package design

== Charts ==
Chart performance for Si Vis Pacem, Para Bellum
| Chart (2020) | Peak position |
|---|---|
| Australian Albums (ARIA) | 21 |
| Austrian Albums (Ö3 Austria) | 27 |
| Belgian Albums (Ultratop Wallonia) | 113 |
| French Albums (SNEP) | 152 |
| German Albums (Offizielle Top 100) | 37 |
| Scottish Albums (Official Charts) | 30 |
| Swiss Albums (Schweizer Hitparade) | 15 |
| US Billboard 200 | 37 |
