= Finding Beauty in Negative Spaces =

Studio album by Seether
- Released: 23 October 2007
- Recorded: Late 2006–2007
- Studios: Bay 7 Studios (Valley Village, California); Sparky Dark Studio (Calabasas, California)
- Genres: Post-grunge; hard rock; alternative metal; alternative rock
- Length: 50:46 (original); 58:05 (reissue)
- Label: Wind-up
- Producer: Howard Benson

Seether chronology
Karma and Effect (2005)	Finding Beauty in Negative Spaces (2007)	Holding Onto Strings Better Left to Fray (2011)

Singles from Finding Beauty in Negative Spaces
- 1. "Fake It" Released: 28 August 2007; 2. "Rise Above This" Released: 19 February 2008; 3. "Breakdown" Released: 9 September 2008; 4. "Careless Whisper" Released: 10 March 2009

Professional ratings
Aggregate scores
Source	Rating
Metacritic	(39/100)
Review scores
Source	Rating
AllMusic	2.5/5 stars
Billboard	(favorable)
Blogcritics	(favorable)
PopMatters	6.5/10 stars
Q	3/5 stars
Rolling Stone	2.5/5 stars
Sputnikmusic	1/5 stars

Finding Beauty in Negative Spaces is the fourth studio album by South African rock band Seether. The album was released in South Africa and Switzerland on 19 October 2007, and released worldwide on 23 October 2007. It is the first album by the band without lead guitarist Pat Callahan.

The cover artwork was designed by David Ho, the same artist who designed the cover for the album Vicious Delicious by Infected Mushroom. The covers apparently display the same character, "Candice the Ghost."

Three singles, "Fake It", "Rise Above This" and "Breakdown" have been released from the album with all three being top 10 singles, the former two reaching the top position on several Billboard charts, despite mixed-to-negative reviews from critics. The album was reissued in 2009 featuring a fourth single, a cover of George Michael's "Careless Whisper".

== Background ==
Between the release of 2005's Karma and Effect and the beginning of recording sessions for Finding Beauty in Negative Spaces, lead singer and guitarist Shaun Morgan split with Evanescence lead singer Amy Lee with whom he had been in a relationship since 2003. The breakup happened due to Morgan's problems with substance abuse, particularly alcoholism. In late July 2006, Morgan checked himself into rehab for what he described as "a dependence on a combination of substances." Combined with the leak of the Evanescence single "Call Me When You're Sober", which Lee later revealed to be about her relationship with Morgan, his stint in rehab and relationship troubles with Lee became widely publicized and a point of frustration.

The band updated both their official website and MySpace on 23 August 2007, with the new single, "Fake It", being uploaded to both. In a post on their website, they wrote:

"Here we are, about to embark on the release of our favorite Seether record to date and can guarantee that you will all feel the same. Finding Beauty in Negative Spaces is a hearty serving of the usual Seether sting and grit with an added twist of lime. We have been working hard in the studio for months recording the album and there are only a few loose ends to cinch up before all is said and done. We can't wait to hit the road to share the new shit with everyone. In the meantime the remodeled site should make it easier for you guys to share your undying love for us, keep up with everyone, and get all the news that will pass through here in coming weeks. The album is dedicated to Eugene "Junior" Welgemoed. Junior has always offered the band more support and love than we've ever given ourselves. He has lit an uncontainable fire under us, and without him we will never be the same again. Cheers to taking the world by storm..."

In the lower right corner of the front cover, where the album title appears, one can faintly see a Chinese symbol overwritten by the letters of the title. The symbol shown is 美, the Chinese character for the word "beauty", or "America".

== Recording and writing ==
Bassist Dale Stewart credited Morgan for naming the album. Stewart explained, "it’s a title that Shaun came up with one day and it immediately just stuck. I think for all of us, it was a timely and appropriate word to describe the last year that we’ve had, you know with writing an album and some other stuff that has happened around us. [...] The music was always the one positive thing that came out of this string of bad things and it really just kind of kept us going."

In a shift from previous albums, the band sought to emphasise melody while complimenting it with their traditional post-grunge sound. Morgan told Reuters, "We wanted to write and explore the more melodic and musical side of everything... We can be heavy and rock out, but we can also write songs that can compete with any other song out there. That was a really big motivation." Additionally, he described Finding Beauty in Negative Spaces as "an album of extremes." Ultimate Guitar noticed there was less grunge-influence on the album and more "stadium-ready hard rock."

The track "Like Suicide" drew disapproval from Wind-up Records, who wanted to exclude the song from the album. "The band wanted 'Like Suicide' on the album, and the label didn't," Morgan told LiveDaily. "We said, 'Fine. We'll make it indispensable to the album.' We started filming it and putting it on YouTube and putting it on MySpace. We went through the whole phase of writing it and rehearsing it to recording the drums, bass, guitar solos and vocals.[...] Then, after we finished recording it, they said, 'Oh, you're so right.'"

"Fallen" is about Morgan's experience in a relationship with a model and being unwillingly exposed to model culture as a result. When asked about "No Jesus Christ", Morgan revealed the song is "an attack on the God complex that people have" and implied that it was inspired by Amy Lee as well. "Walk Away from the Sun" was the first song completed for the album. Morgan stated that it was partially inspired by his stint in rehab.

=== Singles ===
The album's lead single, "Fake It", deals with what Morgan perceived to be a lack of personal authenticity in modern society. In an interview with Revolt In Style, he stated that the song "was [partially] inspired by LA, some [of it] was inspired by my sister. She’s fifteen and she represents what I would consider kids of today, and what I feel kids of today are like. She cares more about Paris Hilton not wearing underwear than great artists. [...] If you don’t have people striving to be themselves, or to be creative, then ultimately people just burn. Concentrating on their physical appearance more than their personality."

"Rise Above This" was written for Shaun's brother, Eugene Welgemoed, prior to the latter's suicide on 13 August 2007. According to Morgan, the song was written about an earlier suicide attempt by Eugene and was intended to bring him out of a depression. The song's guitar riff was influenced by the Smashing Pumpkins song "1979".

For the album's third single, "Breakdown", Morgan stated that his relationship with Lee was "a very big part of the inspiration for that song." He further described the song as being "about not allowing yourself to be beaten down by what people say about you and kind of believing in yourself, and ultimately knowing that you’ll be better for it."

The band's cover of "Careless Whisper" was reportedly borne out of a joke response to Wind-up's request that the band record a Valentine's Day song for iTunes. "None of us are big fans of Valentine's Day," Morgan elaborated, "so we decided to take the piss out of it, and we went with a love song... It's such an over-the-top dramatic song that we had to cover it. It's something we just did as a joke, and we did it for fun, and it became a single."

== Commercial performance ==
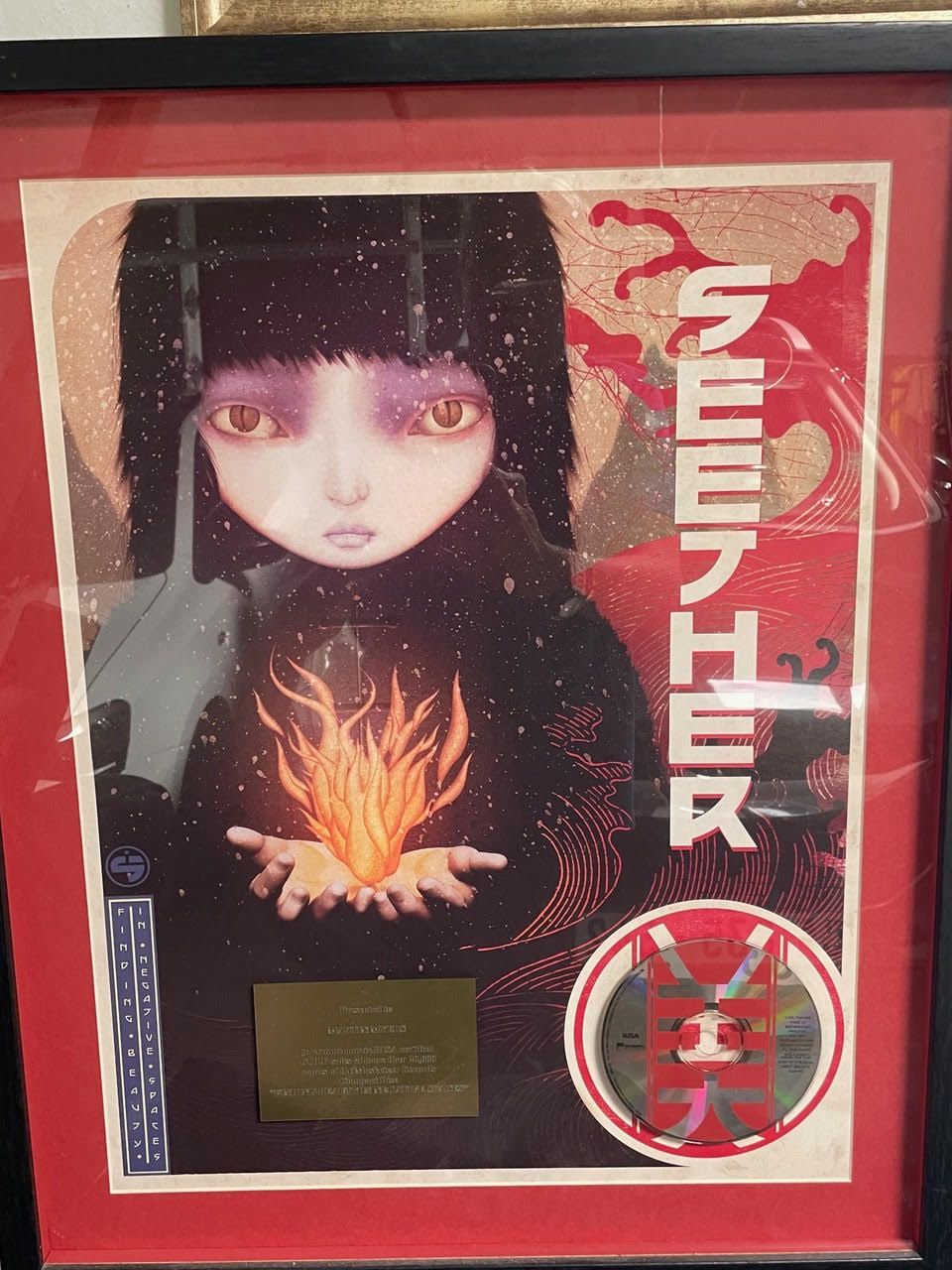
RISA South Africa Gold plaque for the album "Finding Beauty in Negative Space" by Seether.

The album debuted at number nine on the Billboard 200 chart in the US with 56,900 copies moved in its first week, and ended up being certified platinum by the RIAA in 2020 for selling an equivalent of 1 million units. It is also the band's only album to receive Gold certification in their home country of South Africa (certified by the RISA in May 2008).

== Track listing ==
All lyrics are written by Shaun Morgan, except where noted; all music is composed by Seether, except where noted.

Standard edition
No.	Title	Writer(s)	Length
1.	"Like Suicide"		4:15
2.	"Fake It"		3:14
3.	"Breakdown"		3:29
4.	"FMLYHM" ("Fuck Me Like You Hate Me")		3:28
5.	"Fallen"		4:18
6.	"Rise Above This"		3:24
7.	"No Jesus Christ"		7:06
8.	"Six Gun Quota"		3:23
9.	"Walk Away from the Sun"		4:14
10.	"Eyes of the Devil"		5:01
11.	"Don't Believe"		4:35
12.	"Waste"	Morgan; Seether; Jason Smith	4:22
Total length:			50:41

2009 re-release bonus tracks
No.	Title	Writer(s)	Length
13.	"Careless Whisper" (George Michael cover)	George Michael; Andrew Ridgeley	4:57
14.	"Careless Whisper" (Strings version)	Michael; Ridgeley	4:26
Total length:			58:05

iTunes pre-order exclusive
No.	Title	Length
15.	"Quirk" ("Fake It" demo)	3:46
Total length:		63:59

B-sides
No.	Title	Length
16.	"Naked"	5:13
17.	"Left for Dead"	4:00
18.	"Untitled"	3:50
Total length:		75:19

== Credits ==
Seether

- Shaun Morgan – lead vocals, guitar
- Dale Stewart – bass, backing vocals
- John Humphrey – drums
- Troy McLawhorn – guitar (tracks 13, 14)

Additional musicians

- Howard Benson – keyboards, programming
- Space – guitar (track 12)

Technical credits

- Howard Benson – producer
- Ross Petersen – co-producer
- Chris Lord-Alge – mixing
- Mike Plotnikoff – engineer
- Hatsukazu "Hatch" Inagaki – engineer
- Paul DeCarli – digital editing
- Hatsukazu Inagaki – additional engineering
- Ted Jensen – mastering
- Jon Nicholson – drum technician
- Marc VanGool – guitar technician
- Scott D. – guitar technician
- Stu Sobol – management
- Nicki Loranger – management
- David Ho – illustrations
- Gail Marowitz – art direction
- Ed Sherman – package design
- Gregg Wattenberg – A&R, production supervision

== Charts ==
=== Weekly charts ===
Chart (2007–08)	Peak position
Canadian Albums (Billboard)	10
French Albums (SNEP)	154
New Zealand Albums (RMNZ)	9
Swiss Albums (Schweizer Hitparade)	39
US Billboard 200	9
US Top Hard Rock Albums (Billboard)	4
US Top Rock Albums (Billboard)	5

=== Year-end charts ===
Chart (2008)	Position
US Billboard 200	86
US Top Hard Rock Albums (Billboard)	11

Chart (2009)	Position
US Billboard 200	154
US Top Hard Rock Albums (Billboard)	23

== Certifications ==
Region	Certification	Certified units/sales
Canada (Music Canada)	Gold	50,000^{^}
New Zealand (RMNZ)	Platinum	15,000^{‡}
South Africa (RISA)	Gold	20,000^{*}
United States (RIAA)	Platinum	1,000,000^{‡}
^{*} Sales figures based on certification alone.^{^} Shipments figures based on certification alone.^{‡} Sales+streaming figures based on certification alone.
