= Karma and Effect =

Studio album by Seether
- Released: 24 May 2005
- Recorded: 5 October 2004 – 9 January 2005
- Studios: Avatar (New York, New York); Henson (Hollywood, California)
- Genres: Post-grunge; alternative metal; nu metal
- Length: 60:49
- Label: Wind-up
- Producer: Bob Marlette

Seether chronology
Disclaimer II (2004)	Karma and Effect (2005)	Finding Beauty in Negative Spaces (2007)

Singles from Karma and Effect
- 1. "Remedy" Released: 11 April 2005; 2. "Truth" Released: 6 September 2005; 3. "The Gift" Released: 28 February 2006

Professional ratings
Review scores
Source	Rating
AllMusic	3/5 stars
Entertainment Weekly	B−
musicOMH	(mixed)
Ultimate Guitar	9.5/10
Metal Underground	3/5

Karma and Effect is the third studio album by South African rock band Seether. It was released on 24 May 2005 by Wind-up Records. It was the band's first all-new, full-length album under the Seether name in which they performed as a full-fledged band. Consequently, it was the only such album with guitarist Pat Callahan prior to his departure from the band in 2006.

Upon release, the album debuted in the top 10 of numerous national music charts. The album's lead single "Remedy" held the top spot on the Billboard Mainstream Rock Tracks chart for a total of eight weeks. The second and third singles "Truth" and "The Gift", though not to the same extent, also found success on rock radio. Since its release, the album has sold upwards of 1 million units in the United States. It is certified platinum in the US and certified gold in both Canada and New Zealand.

== Recording and writing ==
After the success of their 2002 debut album Disclaimer, lead singer Shaun Morgan began writing new material for a new studio album. Most of the songs that would feature on Karma and Effect were written over the course of 2004 prior to entering the studio.

During the writing and recording process, the band experienced multiple setbacks. Morgan initially wanted to title the album Catering to Cowards, but this was vetoed by Wind-up Records. In addition, Wind-up asked that the cover art be changed. Morgan decided to make an album without using any "cuss" words (according to an interview prior to their "One Cold Night" performance Seether did in 2006).

Morgan stated that the album was "the culmination of a lot of anger and fear of the music industry and the people that happen to have power over our careers."

"Remedy" was one of the first songs to be written in the studio. In a 2022 interview with American Songwriter, Morgan explained the song's origin:

"I was in Los Angeles, and I would go to the producer’s house every day, and he had a studio in his garage. So he just handed me a guitar one day, and there was something about the guitar I just really loved playing, so I just started riffing and making stuff up. Then he said, 'Oh, that’s great, let’s run with that.' So we recorded the riff and he programmed drums to it, and then I came up with a verse, and we sort of built the song that way. I went back and we did the lyrics and vocals and that was the first single. [...] Wind-up was very adamant that we just go with the softer songs. [...] [W]hen 'Remedy' was chosen, there was a big fight, because the label didn't want us representing the heavier side of the band, so I was really happy we won that victory."

In a 2013 Reddit AMA thread, Morgan stated that the lyrics to "Truth" were inspired by a "brutal dysfunctional relationship." He further commented that, for the song's music video, director Dean Karr was the first to propose casting mixed martial artist Tito Ortiz in the role of Uncle Sam.

"The Gift" was vaguely described by Morgan as "a pretty personal song." It was allegedly nearly shelved after Callahan repeatedly objected to the song each time Morgan showed it to the band prior to recording for the album.

The title for the track "Burrito" was inspired by watching The Osbournes. "We didn't have a name for the song," Morgan recalled. "Ozzy was running around mumbling about spicy burritos. And it was one of those moments where it was like, this is a legendary man, but it's a different side of him. It seemed real vulnerable and real personal. So we just picked it because it was a tongue-in-cheek homage to Ozzy Osbourne." The track was one of three songs written for the soundtrack to the 2003 film Daredevil, but was scrapped in favor of their song "Hang On" from Disclaimer II.

== Track listing ==
All lyrics are written by Shaun Morgan; all music is composed by Seether.

No.	Title	Length
1.	"Because of Me"	3:36
2.	"Remedy"	3:27
3.	"Truth"	3:50
4.	"The Gift"	5:34
5.	"Burrito"	3:51
6.	"Given"	3:47
7.	"Never Leave"	4:59
8.	"World Falls Away"	4:40
9.	"Tongue"	4:06
10.	"I'm the One"	2:49
11.	"Simplest Mistake"	5:28
12.	"Diseased"	3:40
13.	"Plastic Man" (The actual song is 3:49, the rest of the song is five minutes of silence)	8:48
14.	"Kom saam met my" (Hidden track, means "Come with Me" or "Join Me" in English, and is sung in Afrikaans)	2:18
Total length:		1:00:49

== Personnel ==
Seether

- Shaun Morgan – vocals, rhythm guitar
- Pat Callahan – lead guitar
- Dale Stewart – bass
- John Humphrey – drums

Other personnel

- Bob Marlette – production, engineering
- Randy Staub – mixing (1, 3–14)
- Rich Costey – mixing (2)
- Sid Riggs – Pro Tools engineering
- Ross Petersen – additional Pro Tools engineering
- Glen Pitman – mix assistant engineering
- Tom Baker – mastering
- Diana Meltzer – A&R
- Gregg Wattenberg – A&R, production supervision
- Ed Sherman – art direction
- Bethany Pawluk – package design
- Benny Haber – band photo
- Gareth Botha – artwork, illustrations

== Unreleased songs ==
Before the release of Karma and Effect, a blog post from the band on their website stated that there would be three B-side tracks for the album: "Let Me Go", "Innocence" and "Blister". "Let Me Go" was included on the B-side of the "Remedy" single. "Innocence" and "Blister" were never mixed or mastered but both songs, likely obtained off the album's demo tapes, were made available on a fan site for a short time. All of these songs were eventually included on the second disc of their greatest hits album, Seether: 2002–2013.

== Charts ==
=== Weekly charts ===
Weekly chart performance for Karma and Effect
Chart (2005)	Peak position
Australian Albums (ARIA)	39
Canadian Albums (Billboard)	13
French Albums (SNEP)	168
German Albums (Offizielle Top 100)	94
New Zealand Albums (RMNZ)	25
Swiss Albums (Schweizer Hitparade)	39
UK Rock & Metal Albums (Official Charts)	23
US Billboard 200	8

=== Year-end charts ===
Year-end chart performance for Karma and Effect
Chart (2005)	Position
US Billboard 200	142

== Certifications ==
Certifications and sales for Karma and Effect
Region	Certification	Certified units/sales
Canada (Music Canada)	Gold	50,000^{^}
New Zealand (RMNZ)	Gold	7,500^{‡}
United States (RIAA)	Platinum	1,000,000^{‡}
^{^} Shipments figures based on certification alone.^{‡} Sales+streaming figures based on certification alone.
