= Seether =

South African rock band

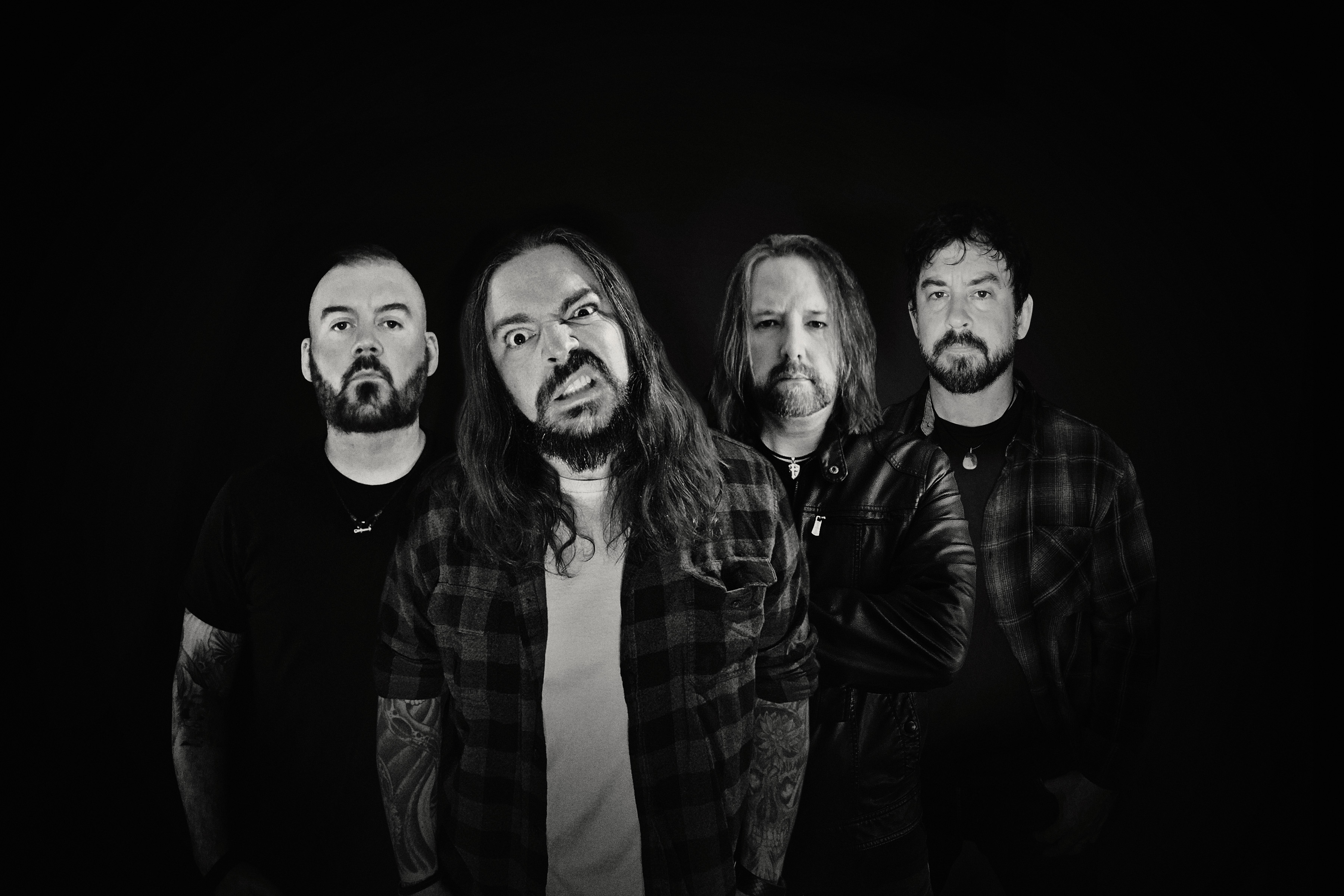
- Seether in 2020. L–R: Stewart, Morgan, Humphrey, Lowery

Background information
- Also known as: Saron Gas (1999–2002)
- Origin: Pretoria, Gauteng, South Africa
- Genres: Post-grunge; hard rock; alternative metal; alternative rock; nu metal (early)
- Years active: 1999–present
- Labels: Wind-up; Bicycle; Concord; Spinefarm; Fantasy; Canine Riot
- Members: Shaun Morgan; Dale Stewart; John Humphrey; Corey Lowery
- Past members: Johan Greyling; Tyronne Morris; David "Dave" Cohoe; Nick Oshiro; Pat Callahan; Troy McLawhorn
- Website: seether.com

Seether are a South African rock band founded in 1999 in Pretoria, Gauteng. The band originally performed under the name Saron Gas until 2002 when they changed it to Seether to avoid confusion with the deadly nerve agent sarin gas. Lead vocalist and guitarist Shaun Morgan is the band's only remaining original member. Bassist Dale Stewart joined a year after formation, while drummer John Humphrey joined them for the band's second album. Since 2018, the band has been employing second guitarist Corey Lowery. Several notable guitarists such as Corey's brother Clint and Troy McLawhorn have toured or recorded with the band; however, Morgan has recorded most guitar parts for the band's records.

Seether gained mainstream popularity in 2002 with their US Active Rock number one single "Fine Again". Their success was sustained in 2004 with the single "Broken", which peaked at number 20 on the Billboard Hot 100. They have experienced continued success with many number one hits on the Hot Mainstream Rock Tracks chart, such as "Remedy", "Fake It", "Country Song", "Tonight", "Words as Weapons", "Let You Down", "Dangerous", "Bruised and Bloodied", and "Wasteland". The band has released nine studio albums; their most recent, The Surface Seems So Far, was released in 2024.

== History ==
=== Formation as Saron Gas (1999–2001) ===
The band formed in South Africa in May 1999 under the name Saron Gas. Consisting of frontman, vocalist, and guitarist Shaun Morgan, bassist Tyronne Morris (who left the band in December 1999 and was replaced by Dale Stewart in January 2000), drummer Dave Cohoe, and guitarist Johan Greyling (who departed shortly after the band's formation), Saron Gas released their first album, Fragile, in October 2000 under Johannesburg-based independent record label Musketeer Records. Despite the region's focus primarily on pop and indigenous music, the band found success, and eventually caught attention of American record label Wind-up Records, who gave them a record deal to begin releasing music in North America. Upon signing to the label, they were told they needed to change their name due to its similarity to sarin gas, and switched to calling themselves Seether, after the Veruca Salt song. Around the same time, Cohoe departed from the band. His replacement on drums was not immediately named.

=== Disclaimer releases (2002–2004) ===
In August 2002, Seether launched their first official album, Disclaimer, which earned the band three singles: "Fine Again", "Driven Under", and "Gasoline", in which only the first managed significant success. "Fine Again" was also included in the video games Madden NFL 2003 in 2002 and 1080° Avalanche in 2003. After utilizing session drummers on Disclaimer, the band brought in Nick Oshiro as the full-time drummer. In addition, Patrick Callahan was added to the lineup as a second guitarist.

Following the release of Disclaimer, the band toured continually in order to increase sales and gain name recognition. A planned second album was delayed for nearly a year when Seether was selected as the support act for an Evanescence worldwide tour. Seether reworked their acoustic ballad "Broken" into an electric ballad with guest vocals by Amy Lee of Evanescence. Favourable audience response led the band to record the revised version, with Lee on vocals. The track, along with a new song entitled "Sold Me", was featured on the soundtrack for the 2004 film The Punisher, and became a major success for the band, particularly in the United States, the United Kingdom, and Australia. A romance developed between Lee and Morgan during this time. The band also had their song "Hang On" featured in the 2003 film Daredevil.

Morgan has stated that the reworking of "Broken" was due to the wishes of the record company rather than those of the band. An alternate version of the original album, with many of its songs remixed or re-recorded, was released in June 2004 and entitled Disclaimer II. The alternate version also featured eight extra tracks. Prior to the recording of Disclaimer II, Oshiro left the band in order to join Static-X, and he was replaced on drums by John Humphrey.

=== Karma and Effect (2005–2006) ===
Seether's follow-up album, Karma and Effect, was released in May 2005. Originally titled Catering to Cowards, the name was changed due to the record label's demand. Karma and Effect debuted at number 8 on the US Billboard 200 album charts and was certified gold in the US and Canada. The album spawned three singles, "Remedy", "Truth", and "The Gift". "Remedy" reached number 1 on the US Mainstream Rock Charts, Seether's first number 1 hit.

Seether released an acoustic CD/DVD set titled One Cold Night, recorded at the Grape Street Club in Philadelphia, on 22 February 2006. Morgan had been suffering from a stomach ailment, and decided to do an acoustic performance of their set rather than cancel the show. The exclusion of "Needles" and "Burrito" from the album is due to the label's desire that it contain no obscenities.

Guitarist Callahan's departure from the band was announced on 15 June 2006. His last performance with them was on 3 June. Pat was later interviewed on a radio show in Philadelphia where he said his departure was not anything musical, but he and the singer Shaun had a "personality" clash and were not seeing eye to eye, and just couldn't work things out, but was still very friendly with the other two members. Pat also did not like certain band decisions. One example was the band being on the Punisher and Daredevil soundtrack in which he did not like the lineup of bands they were associated with. Shaun Morgan himself later commented on Pat's departure:

"Um... relieved a little... actually a lot. He was the guy in the band that was always our naysayer, and he was the negative energy as far as writing. I personally have no love lost, which is weird for some reason 'cause he was my friend for four years. But when he walked out, it kinda walked out with him."

Morgan entered a rehabilitation program for what he felt was "dependence on a combination of substances" in August 2006, which forced the band to cancel a tour with Staind and Three Days Grace.

=== Finding Beauty in Negative Spaces (2007–2009) ===
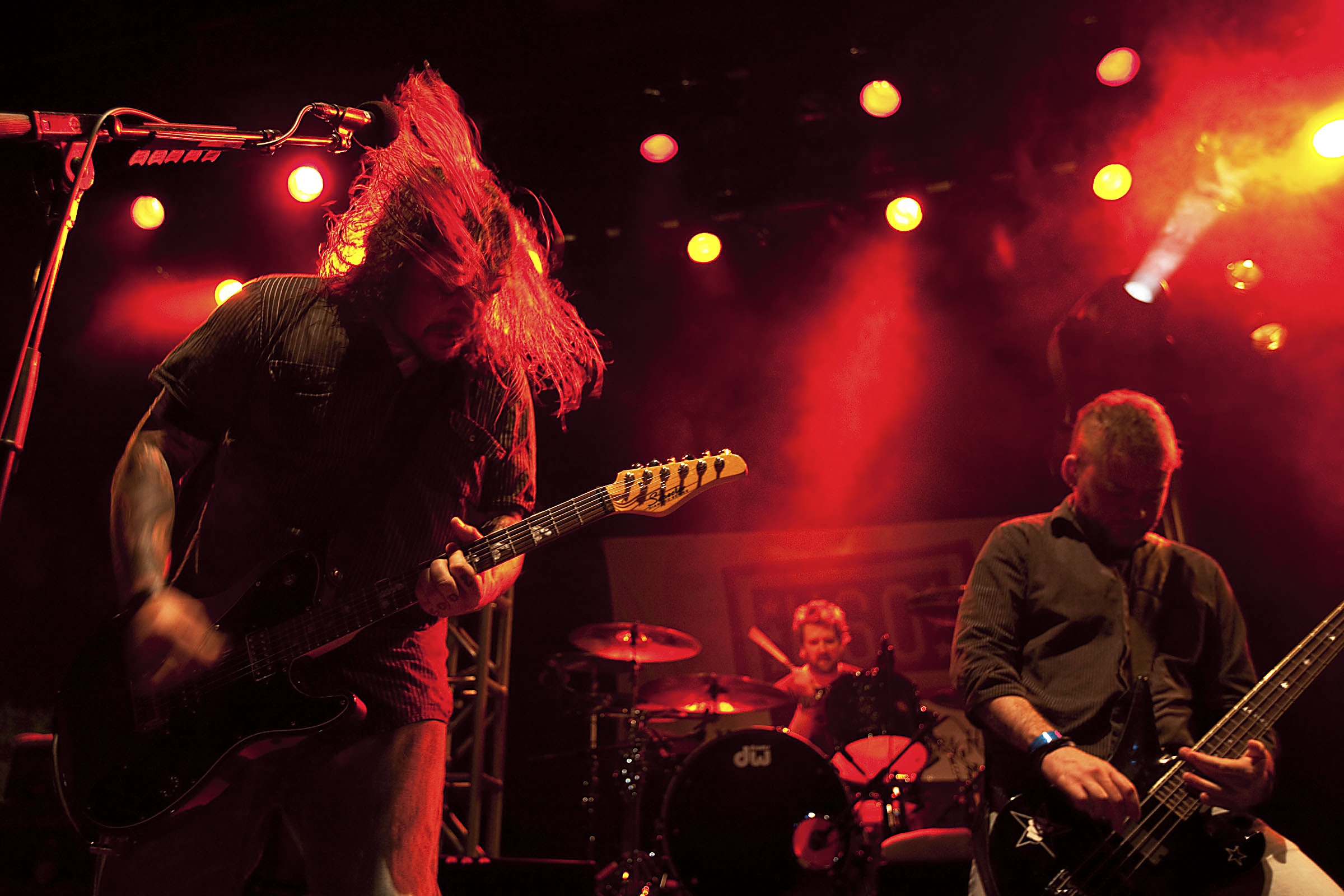
Seether performing in 2008

Shaun Morgan, prior to the next album's release, claimed that it would be more diverse than previous efforts. Finding Beauty in Negative Spaces was slated for an August 2007 release but was delayed until 23 October 2007 due to the suicide of Morgan's brother, Eugene Welgemoed. The album debuted at number 9 in the Billboard 200 album charts, and sold 57,000 copies in its first week. Its cover artwork featured "Candice the Ghost", and was illustrated by David Ho. The first single, "Fake It", reached the top position of the US Mainstream Rock Charts and Modern Rock Charts, and held that spot for at least 9 weeks on both charts. It became the theme for WWE's No Way Out (2008). "Rise Above This", written for Eugene Welgemoed, was released as a single and reached the No. 1 spot on the Modern Rock Tracks chart and No. 2 on its mainstream counterpart, Mainstream Rock Songs. The final single from the album was "Breakdown", the video for which was released on 12 November 2008 after a delay from its original scheduled release date of 23 October. Finding Beauty in Negative Spaces won Seether's first South African Music Award in the category "Best Rock: English", as well as their first MTV Africa Music Award for "Best Alternative Artist".

A tour launched in support of the album in early 2008 lasted much of the year. Troy McLawhorn of Dark New Day, Evanescence, and doubleDrive was hired as a touring guitarist on 15 February 2008. Bands Seether shared the stage with on the tour included Three Days Grace, Finger Eleven, Breaking Benjamin, 3 Doors Down, Skillet, Red, Papa Roach, Flyleaf, Econoline Crush, and Staind. McLawhorn was afterwards made an official member of the band.

"No Shelter" appeared on the NCIS Official TV Soundtrack, released on 10 February 2009, and a version of George Michael's "Careless Whisper" was made available for purchase as a digital or mobile download. The song was reportedly covered as a joke, in which the band turned an "80s pop ballad" into a hard rock/metal song in response to Wind-up's request that they record a Valentine's Day song. The music video for "Careless Whisper" premiered on 15 June 2009, and the song is included as an additional track on the reissue of Finding Beauty in Negative Spaces.

Seether supported Nickelback on their Dark Horse tour in March and April 2009. Shaun and Dale confirmed in an interview on 2 March 2009 that, after the Nickelback tour, Seether would take the rest of year off to write and record the follow-up to Finding Beauty in Negative Spaces. The band nevertheless gave performances through the remainder of the year, which included a date in Okinawa to play for American troops as part of a USO tour on 23 and 24 May at Camp Schwab, and then in MCAS Iwakuni on 26 May for the US Marines. Seether also made appearances at a number of festivals during the summer, including sets at the Chippewa Valley Music Festival and the Quebec City Festival, before the tour's conclusion at The Big E Festival, West Springfield, Massachusetts, on 4 October.

Seether covered the song "I've Got You Under My Skin" on the Frank Sinatra tribute album His Way, Our Way, which came out on 7 July 2009.

=== Holding Onto Strings Better Left to Fray (2010–2013) ===
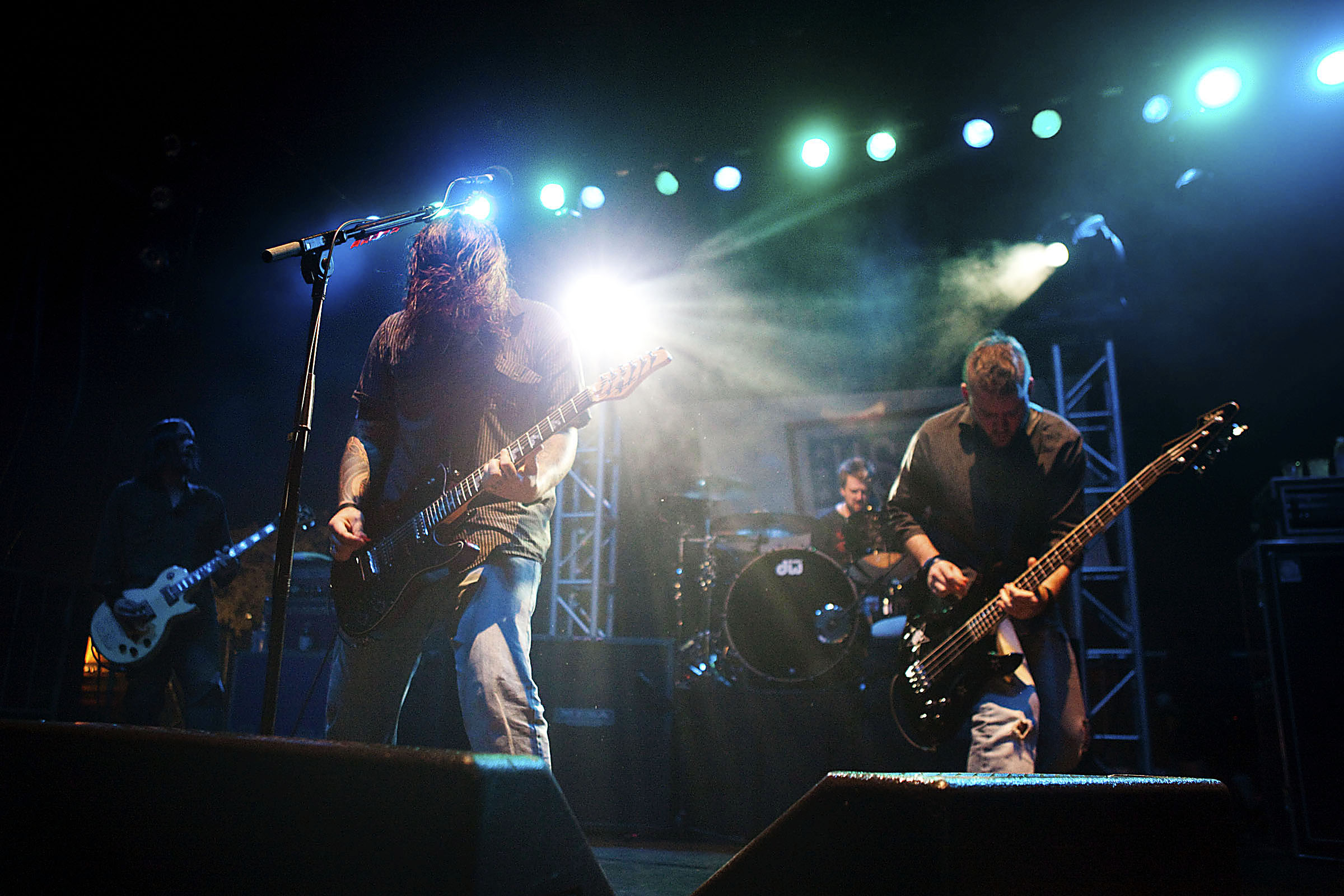
Seether performing in 2012

The band spent several months recording in Nashville, Tennessee with producer Brendan O'Brien, then resumed touring in April 2010 with the intention of returning to the studio "in the first week of June" to complete the new record. Drummer John Humphrey confirmed in August that recording was completed, and the album was in the mixing process. He said that the band believed this album to be their best work, and that the songs are "very strong, melodic, and heavy at times". Morgan confirmed the album's completion in September, and gave the expected release date as early 2011. A new song, "No Resolution", was debuted on 4 September 2010, during a live show at the DuQuoin, IL State Fair. McLawhorn and Humphrey, in a radio interview, announced that the new album would be titled Holding Onto Strings Better Left to Fray, and that it would be released in May. The album's first single, "Country Song", was released on 8 March in the US and on 4 April in the United Kingdom, and the new album was released on 17 May 2011. Seether reached their highest position on the US Billboard 200 Charts when Holding Onto Strings Better Left to Fray rose to the Number 2 position. It also reached number one on the US Rock Albums, US Alternative Albums, and US Hard Rock Album Charts. Their single-week sales of 61,000 records was their best since Karma and Effect sold 82,000 copies in 2005. Billboard named Seether the No. 1 Active and No. 1 Heritage Rock Artist of 2011. A remix EP of the Holding Onto Strings Better Left to Fray album, titled Remix EP, was released on 7 February 2012.

Troy McLawhorn's departure from the band and return to Evanescence was announced on 8 March. Seether performed live in Cincinnati, Ohio on 10 May, and in South Bend, Indiana on 11 May. Both concerts were recorded, and released as a limited edition CD set for each individual city. The band played main stage at the Uproar Festival alongside Avenged Sevenfold, Three Days Grace, Bullet For My Valentine, and Escape The Fate, and supported 3 Doors Down on their European tour from November to March.

On 3 September 2013, Seether announced the name of a compilation album, titled Seether: 2002-2013. It was released on 29 October 2013 as a 2-disc album featuring some of the band's greatest hits, unreleased demos, soundtrack songs, and 3 all-new tracks, including a cover of Veruca Salt's "Seether" (the song that the band is named after). Seether: 2002-2013 also contains two new recorded songs ("Safe to Say I've Had Enough" and "Weak") and was produced by Brendan O'Brien. The band released a 15-second demo clip for the song "Safe to Say I've Had Enough" on loudwire.com. They also carried out a small, semi-acoustic tour of Europe and South Africa.

On 30 November 2013, Seether released a 3-track single titled "Goodbye Tonight", featuring Van Coke Kartel & Jon Savage. The song is also featured on the deluxe edition of their follow-up album Isolate and Medicate.

=== Isolate and Medicate (2014–2016) ===
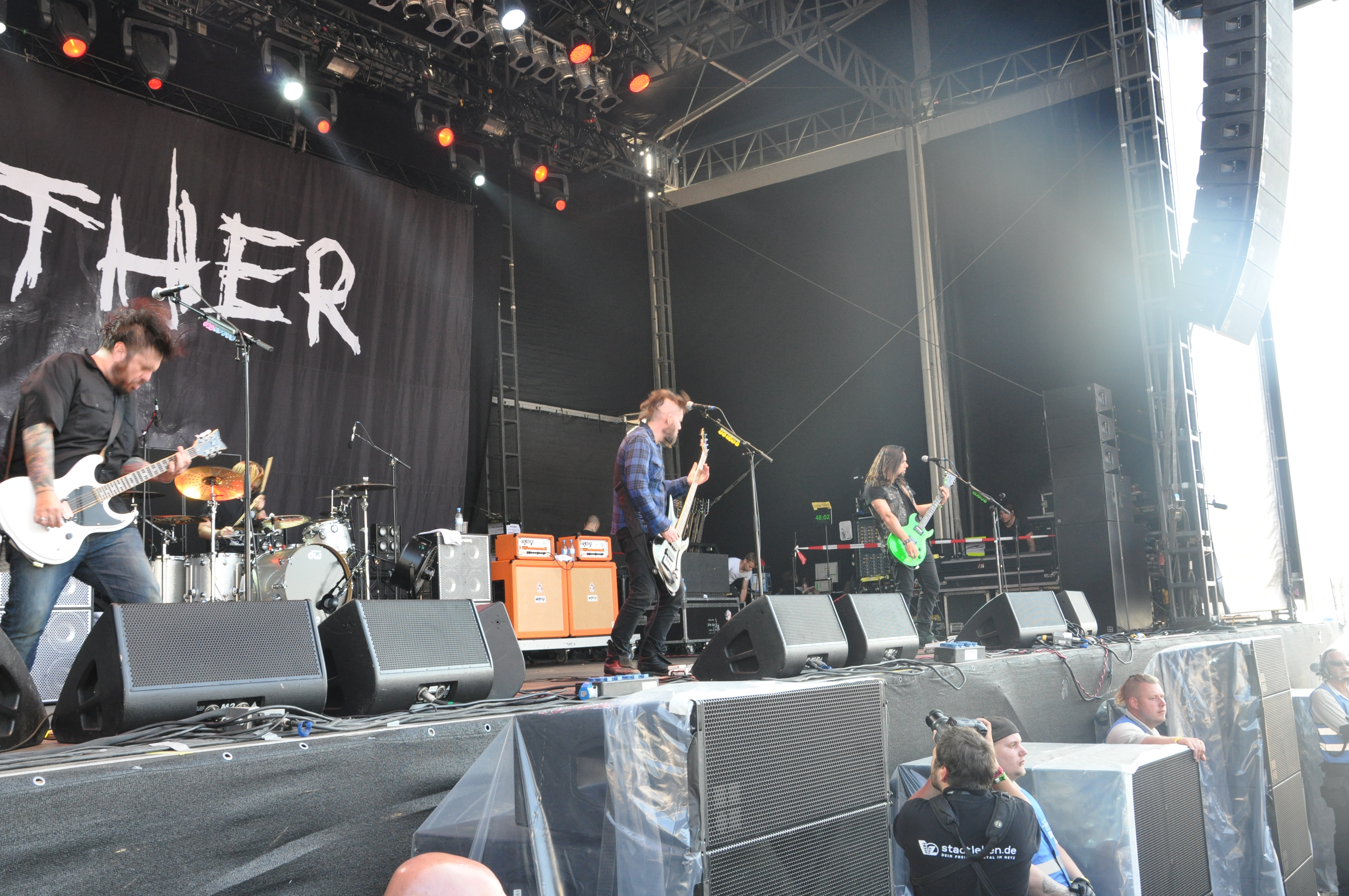
Seether performing at Rock am Ring in 2014

In a 2013 Twitter interview, bassist Dale Stewart confirmed that the band was writing songs for their next album. During an AmA (askmeanything) interview on Reddit.com, Shaun Morgan stated that the band was "In the studio getting ready for our new album..."

On 24 April 2014, it was revealed that the album Isolate and Medicate would be released on 1 July 2014, with the lead single "Words as Weapons" slated for release on 1 May 2014.

On 29 April 2014, Bryan Wickmann was announced as the new touring guitarist. Wickmann was the band's long-time guitar tech, as well as Isolate and Medicate's cover art creator, and a former art director of Schecter Guitar Research.

On 17 May 2014, Seether performed their first single, "Words as Weapons," from the album Isolate and Medicate, live at the Orbit Room in front of 1,700 fans. The band released a music video for the album's second single, "Same Damn Life," on 30 October 2014. The video was directed by Nathan Cox. In late May and early June, Seether announced European tour dates in September, along with several stops in the UK. On 7 July, Seether kicked off their summer tour with 3 Doors Down.

=== Poison the Parish (2016–2018) ===
On 13 September 2016, Seether shared pictures of them recording a new album on social media. They announced in November that they were to release their seventh album in May 2017. A countdown timer later started on Seether's website, counting down to 23 February 2017.

Morgan appeared on Octane on 22 February to discuss the new record, entitled Poison the Parish. Jose Mangin stated that the new material is looking to be "harder than anything they've done". The album was released through Morgan's label Canine Riot Records. Three singles, "Let You Down", "Betray and Degrade", and "Against the Wall", were released in support of the album, all charting significantly on the Billboard Mainstream Rock songs chart.

In May, July, and August 2017, the band toured throughout the United States with American hard rock band Letters from the Fire, adding guitarist Clint Lowery (Sevendust, Dark New Day) to the touring lineup. They then recorded a cover of "Black Honey" by American post-hardcore band Thrice during a live session for SiriusXM in June 2017. In February 2018, Clint Lowery returned to Sevendust to begin touring and promoting their album All I See Is War. His brother (and former Dark New Day bassist), Corey, took over his duties as Seether's touring guitarist. The band then supported Nickelback on their eight-week Feed the Machine European and UK tour. Before the tour ended, Corey Lowery was initiated as a full-time member of the band. On 20 May 2018, Seether played in their hometown of Johannesburg for the first time in six years. On 6 June 2018, they released an acoustic version of "Against the Wall," along with an accompanying music video.

=== Si Vis Pacem, Para Bellum, The Surface Seems So Far, and Beneath the Surface (2019–present) ===
In June 2019, John Humphrey revealed that recording had commenced for their upcoming eighth studio album. On 24 June 2020, the band announced their eighth studio album, Si Vis Pacem, Para Bellum, set for release on 28 August 2020 through Fantasy Records. They also released the first single of the album, "Dangerous". Translating to "If You Want Peace, Prepare for War", the album features 13 new tracks, and was produced by Morgan himself in Nashville, Tennessee from December 2019 to January 2020. On 17 July, the band released the second single, "Bruised and Bloodied". On 14 August, two weeks before the album release, the band released their third single "Beg".

In July 2021, the band released an EP titled Wasteland – The Purgatory. On 1 July 2022, the band released the deluxe edition of Si Vis Pacem, Para Bellum.

The band announced the new single "Judas Mind" which was released on 10 July 2024. "Illusion" The band's ninth studio album, titled The Surface Seems So Far, was released on 20 September 2024. The band released a new single titled "Into the Ground" on 20 March 2026. On the same date, they announced the digital-only EP Beneath the Surface, released on 17 April 2026. The EP acts as a continuation of The Surface Seems So Far.

== Musical style and influences ==
Seether has been described as post-grunge, hard rock, alternative metal and alternative rock, while their early work has been characterized as nu metal. The band is heavily influenced by American grunge, such as Nirvana and Alice in Chains. AllMusic's Stephen Thomas Erlewine wrote "Seether's lead singer/songwriter, Shaun Morgan, is an unabashed, unapologetic worshiper of Kurt Cobain, using Nirvana's sound as a template for Seether." Further, in the band's AllMusic biography staff writer Bradley Torreano states that the band makes strong use of melody, as well as what he described as "Wall-of-Guitar attack." Seether have also been influenced by Deftones and Nine Inch Nails. Si Vis Pacem, Para Bellum, in particular, takes heavy influence from the bands A Perfect Circle and Deftones.

== Band members ==
Current

- Shaun Morgan – lead vocals, rhythm guitar, piano (1999–present); lead guitar (1999–2002, 2006–2008, 2011–2018)
- Dale Stewart – bass, backing vocals, acoustic guitar (2000–present)
- John Humphrey – drums, percussion (2003–present)
- Corey Lowery – lead guitar, backing vocals (2019–present; touring 2018–2019)

Former

- Johan Greyling – lead guitar (1999)
- Tyronne Morris – bass (1999)
- Dave Cohoe – drums, backing vocals (1999–2002)
- Nick Oshiro – drums (2002–2003)
- Pat Callahan – lead guitar (2002–2006)
- Troy McLawhorn – lead guitar, backing vocals (2008–2011)

Former touring/session musicians

- Josh Freese – drums (2002)
- Nic Argyros – drums (2002)
- John Johnston – drums (2002)
- Erik Eldenius – drums (2002)
- Nick Annis – guitar (2002)
- Kevin Soffera – drums, backing vocals (2003)
- Brian Tichy – drums (2007)
- Bryan Wickman – lead guitar, backing vocals (2014–2017)
- Clint Lowery – lead guitar, backing vocals (2017–2018)
- Shaun Foist – drums (one-off show in 2022)

== Discography ==
- Fragile (2000) (Note: Released under the name "Saron Gas".)
- Disclaimer (2002)
- Disclaimer II (2004)
- Karma and Effect (2005)
- Finding Beauty in Negative Spaces (2007)
- Holding Onto Strings Better Left to Fray (2011)
- Isolate and Medicate (2014)
- Poison the Parish (2017)
- Si Vis Pacem, Para Bellum (2020)
- The Surface Seems So Far (2024)

== Awards and nominations ==
Awards	Category	Nominated work	Year of award	Result
MTV Africa Music Awards	Best Alternative Artist	Seether	2008	Won
MTV Africa Music Awards	Artist of The Year	Seether	2008	Nominated
South African Music Awards	Best Rock: English	Seether	2008	Won
BDS Spin Awards	200,000 Spins	Fine Again	2003	Won
BDS Spin Awards	50,000 Spins	Driven Under	2003	Won
BDS Spin Awards	50,000 Spins	Gasoline	2005	Won
BDS Spin Awards	200,000 Spins	Remedy	2005	Won
BDS Spin Awards	50,000 Spins	Truth	2006	Won
BDS Spin Awards	300,000 Spins	Broken	2007	Won
BMI Pop Awards	Best Pop	Fine Again	2004	Won
BMI Pop Awards	Best Pop	Broken	2006	Won
BMI Pop Awards	Best Pop	Fake It	2008	Won
Billboard charts	No. 1 Active Rock Artist	Seether	2011	Won
Billboard charts	No. 1 Heritage Rock Artist	Seether	2011	Won
Billboard charts	Active Rock Song of 2011	"Country Song"	2011	Won
Canadian Hot 100	Active Rock Song of 2011	"Country Song"	2011	Won
Mediabase	No. 1 Song of The Year (in terms of airplay)	"Country Song"	2011	Won
Metals Edge	Best Song In a Movie Soundtrack	"Broken"	2004	Won
Revolver Golden Gods Awards	Best Live Band	Seether	2012	Won
Radio Contraband	Indie Artist of the Year	Seether	2012	Won
