= Shaun Morgan =

South African musician (born 1978)

- Morgan performing with Seether in 2026

Background information
- Born: Shaun Morgan Welgemoed; 21 December 1978 (age 47)
- Origin: Pietermaritzburg, South Africa
- Genres: Post-grunge; alternative metal; hard rock; nu metal
- Occupations: Musician; singer; songwriter; producer
- Instruments: Vocals; guitar
- Years active: 1999–present
- Member of: Seether
- Spouse: Jordan Kirby (m. 2021)
- Children: 2

Shaun Morgan Welgemoed (Afrikaans: [ˈvæl.χəˌmut], born 21 December 1978) is a South African musician. He is the lead singer, songwriter, and rhythm guitarist for the rock band Seether.

== Early life ==
Morgan spent most of his early life in South Africa. His parents divorced when he was still a child. Morgan is the youngest of three children; he had a brother, Eugene, who died by suicide in 2007, and a sister, Lucy. He was a student at Merchiston Preparatory School and Maritzburg College in Pietermaritzburg, where he played rugby in his first three years of high school. In his third year, he injured his back and was unable to play anymore, which then led to him picking up the guitar.

At the age of fourteen, he discovered the Seattle grunge movement after listening to Nirvana's Nevermind album, which inspired him to become a musician.

== Career ==
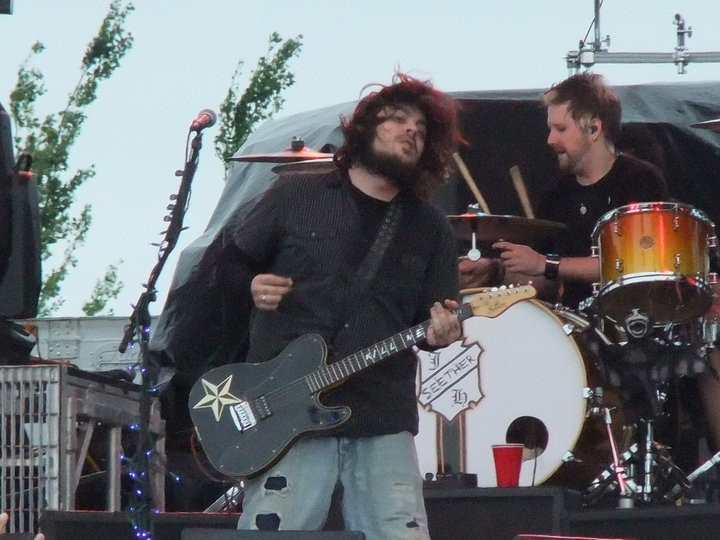
Morgan performing with Seether in 2010

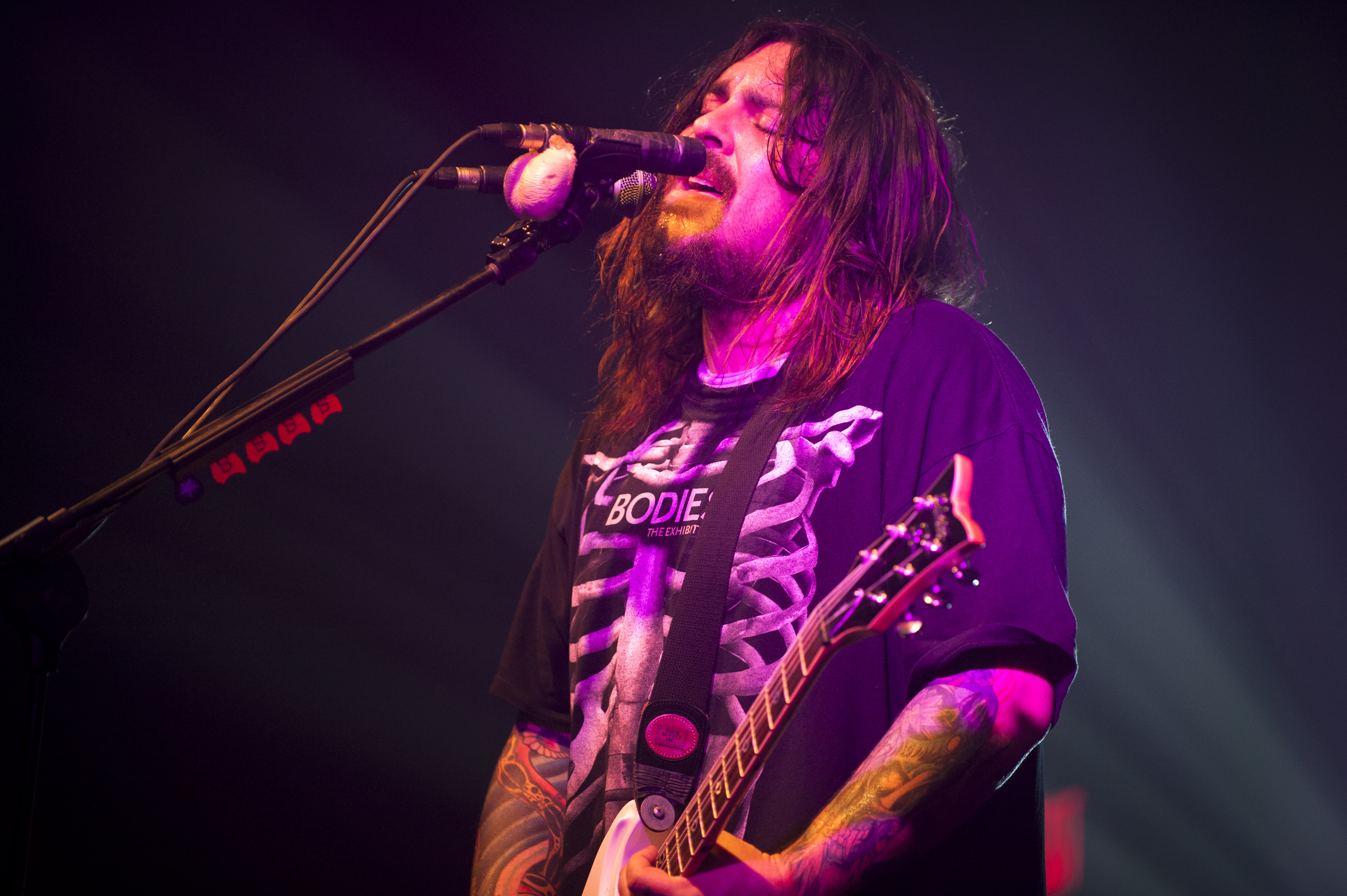
Morgan performing with Seether in 2012

Prior to forming the band Saron Gas, Morgan was a member of a tribute band, covering songs by musicians such as Creed and Tom Petty. In May 1999, the band Saron Gas was created. They were originally a four-piece, but when the singer and guitarist did not turn up to the first practice, the band decided to stay as a three-piece, with Morgan on lead vocals and guitar. Saron Gas enjoyed moderate success before the bass player decided to quit in January 2000, causing Morgan to get in touch with the only other good bass player he knew, Dale Stewart. The band released an album later that year, entitled Fragile.

In January 2002, they relocated to the United States to sign with Wind-up Records. During this time, the band's original drummer returned home to South Africa, whilst the two remaining members were left to think of a new band name, at the request of Wind-up. Eventually they settled on Seether, after the Veruca Salt song of the same name. Around this time, Morgan decided to use his middle name as his last name professionally while performing for Seether because some Americans have a hard time pronouncing "Welgemoed". Seether went on to release their debut major-label album, Disclaimer, on 20 August 2002, which was remixed and rereleased as Disclaimer II with a few additional songs in 2004.

Since then, Seether has released seven more studio albums: Karma and Effect (2005), Finding Beauty in Negative Spaces (2007), Holding Onto Strings Better Left to Fray (2011), Isolate and Medicate (2014), Poison the Parish (2017), Si Vis Pacem, Para Bellum (2020), and The Surface Seems So Far (2024). In addition, they issued the live CD/DVD One Cold Night in 2006.

In 2013, Morgan collaborated with Hall of Fame band Lynyrd Skynyrd and guitarist John 5 on "Sad Song", a track that appeared on the special edition of Lynyrd Skynyrd's album Last of a Dyin' Breed.

Bands that have influenced Morgan include Nirvana, Portishead, Silverchair, The Beatles, Metallica, Stone Temple Pilots, Nine Inch Nails, Mad Season, Rage Against the Machine, Black Sabbath, Korn, Soundgarden, Led Zeppelin, Alice in Chains, Pearl Jam, and Deftones.

== Equipment ==
Shaun Morgan was originally offered an endorsement and a signature model with PRS, but declined. He became endorsed by Schecter Guitars early in his career and stayed with them until 2019. He now plays an Ernie Ball Music Man StingRay RS guitar.

== Personal life ==
From 2003 to 2005, Morgan dated Evanescence singer Amy Lee. Morgan checked into rehab in July 2006. Lee wrote the song "Call Me When You're Sober" about her relationship with him.

On 13 August 2007, Morgan's brother Eugene Welgemoed killed himself by jumping from an eighth-floor window of the Radisson Hotel in Rapid City, South Dakota, shortly after midnight. According to police, no foul play was suspected. Two months later, Finding Beauty in Negative Spaces was released. Since the album was already finished, there was no delay to its issue, but the record was dedicated to Eugene and featured a memorial. Seether's song "Rise Above This" is a tribute to Eugene, written a few weeks before his death. Morgan has 1308 tattooed on his four right fingers, and 2007 on his four left fingers, marking the date his brother died.

In May 2021, Morgan married his longtime partner, Jordan Kirby, with whom he has a daughter and a son.

Morgan is an atheist.

== Discography ==
=== Saron Gas ===
- Fragile (2000)

=== Seether ===
Studio albums

- Disclaimer (2002)
- Disclaimer II (2004)
- Karma and Effect (2005)
- Finding Beauty in Negative Spaces (2007)
- Holding Onto Strings Better Left to Fray (2011)
- Isolate and Medicate (2014)
- Poison the Parish (2017)
- Si Vis Pacem, Para Bellum (2020)
- The Surface Seems So Far (2024)

=== Collaborations ===
- Art of Dying featuring Shaun Morgan – "Die Trying" (2008)
- HURT featuring Shaun Morgan – "World Ain't Right" on the album Goodbye to the Machine (2009)
- Bishop Lamont featuring Shaun Morgan – "Phoenix" (2016)
