= Seether: 2002–2013 =

Greatest hits album by Seether
- Released: 29 October 2013
- Recorded: 2002–2013
- Genres: Post-grunge; hard rock; alternative metal; nu metal
- Length: 58:14 (disc one); 47:23 (disc two)
- Label: Wind-up
- Producers: Brendan O'Brien; Howard Benson

Seether chronology
Holding Onto Strings Better Left to Fray (2011)	Seether: 2002–2013 (2013)	Isolate and Medicate (2014)

Singles from Seether: 2002–2013
- 1. "Seether" Released: 3 September 2013; 2. "Weak" Released: 1 November 2013

Seether: 2002–2013 is the fourth compilation album by South African rock band Seether. It was released on 29 October 2013 through Wind-up Records. It is entirely produced by Brendan O'Brien.

The first disc comprises the band's well-known songs and singles, while the second disc comprises a cover of Veruca Salt's song "Seether", the song after which the band is named, two new studio tracks, plus unreleased demos, B-sides, and soundtrack songs.

== Track listing ==
Disc one
No.	Title	Length
1.	"Fine Again" (Disclaimer)	4:04
2.	"Driven Under" (Disclaimer)	4:33
3.	"Gasoline" (Disclaimer)	2:49
4.	"Broken" (The Punisher: The Album and Disclaimer II; featuring Amy Lee)	4:18
5.	"Remedy" (Karma and Effect)	3:27
6.	"Truth" (Karma and Effect)	3:50
7.	"The Gift" (Karma and Effect)	5:34
8.	"Fake It" (Finding Beauty in Negative Spaces)	3:14
9.	"Rise Above This" (Finding Beauty in Negative Spaces)	3:24
10.	"Breakdown" (Finding Beauty in Negative Spaces)	3:29
11.	"Careless Whisper" (George Michael cover; Finding Beauty in Negative Spaces)	4:56
12.	"Country Song" (Holding Onto Strings Better Left to Fray)	3:49
13.	"Tonight" (Holding Onto Strings Better Left to Fray)	3:43
14.	"No Resolution" (Holding Onto Strings Better Left to Fray)	3:08
15.	"Here and Now" (Holding Onto Strings Better Left to Fray)	3:56

Disc two
No.	Title	Length
1.	"Seether" (Veruca Salt cover)	3:36
2.	"Safe to Say I've Had Enough"	3:29
3.	"Weak"	3:48
4.	"Out of My Way" (Freddy vs. Jason and Disclaimer II)	3:53
5.	"Hang On" (Daredevil: The Album and Disclaimer II)	3:11
6.	"Blister" (Karma and Effect demo)	3:37
7.	"Innocence" (Karma and Effect demo)	4:36
8.	"Let Me Go" ("Remedy" B-side)	3:21
9.	"No Shelter" (NCIS: The Official TV Soundtrack and Native Noise Collection Vol. 1: The Seether Sessions)	4:09
10.	"Burn the Bridges" (Holding Onto Strings Better Left to Fray demo)	4:18
11.	"Butterfly with Teeth" (Holding Onto Strings Better Left to Fray demo)	5:09
12.	"Melodious" (Holding Onto Strings Better Left to Fray demo)	4:16

== Reception ==
Professional ratings
Review scores
Source	Rating
AllMusic	3.5/5 stars

In his review for AllMusic, Stephen Thomas Erlewine calls the album "a by-the-books greatest-hits, a 15-track overview" with an ugly cover of a dog defecating. Regarding the contents of the compilation, he notes the emphasis on the band's latter-day albums over the earlier works. The inclusion on a cover version of Veruca Salt's "Seether" on a second disc of rarities, demos, and B-sides "should please fans".
