= Perfect Self =

Studio album by Stereomud
- Released: May 22, 2001
- Genre: Nu metal; alternative metal; hard rock
- Length: 44:55
- Label: Columbia; Loud
- Producer: Rick Parashar; Howie Beno; Don Gilmore; John B. Davis; Corey Lowery (co.)

Stereomud chronology
Perfect Self (2001)	Every Given Moment (2003)

Singles from Perfect Self
- 1. "Pain" Released: 2001; 2. "Steppin Away" Released: 2001

Professional ratings
Review scores
Source	Rating
AllMusic	2.5/5 stars

Perfect Self is the debut album by the American rock band Stereomud. It was released on May 22, 2001 through Loud Records and was manufactured via Columbia Records. The album met with moderate commercial success, with its two singles, "Pain" and "Steppin Away", both featuring their own music videos. The album sold more than 100,000 units in the US.

Musically, the album has been described as hard rock with metal influences, similar in style to that of Sevendust (bassist Corey Lowery is younger brother to Clint Lowery of Sevendust and Dark New Day). The album's sound varies from rock and metal-based songs, as vocalist Erik Rogers also varies between clean tone singing and the traditional screaming found in metal music.

The album is listed as having a total of 23 tracks (which was a "lucky" number for Lowery); however, 10 of these tracks are listed as "[untitled track]". These tracks are small electronica-based interludes that are variations of the final track, "Perfect Self", which is a blend of acoustic and electronica.

"Don't Be Afraid" was featured in the soundtrack for the video game ATV Offroad Fury 2.

== Track listing ==
All tracks are written by Corey Lowery, Erik Rogers, Dan Richardson, Joey Zampella, and John Fattoruso; additional writers listed below.

No.	Title	Writer(s)	Length
1.	"Intro"		0:32
2.	"Leave (Back Up)"	Don Gilmore	3:33
3.	"Don't Be Afraid"	Gilmore	3:18
4.	"Interlude #1"		0:12
5.	"Old Man"		3:19
6.	"Pain"	Donny Hamby	3:37
7.	"Steppin Away"		3:22
8.	"How We Stand"		2:45
9.	"Interlude #2"		0:15
10.	"Down from Here"		3:10
11.	"Sunlight"		4:05
12.	"Lost Your Faith"		2:31
13.	"Get Me Out"	Gilmore	3:01
14.	"What"		3:06
15.	"Interlude #3"		0:26
16.	"Closer Now"		3:05
17.	"Interlude #4"		0:04
18.	"Interlude #5"		0:04
19.	"Interlude #6"		0:04
20.	"Interlude #7"		0:04
21.	"Interlude #8"		0:04
22.	"Interlude #9"		0:04
23.	"Perfect Self"	Clint Lowery	3:56

== Credits ==
Stereomud

- Erik Rogers – vocals
- Corey Lowery – bass, vocals
- Joey Zampella – guitar
- John Fattoruso – guitar
- Dan Richardson – drums

Production and design

- Don Gilmore – producer and engineer (2, 3, 13)
- Rick Parashar – producer (5–8, 10–12, 14), co-producer (16), engineer (5–8, 10–12, 14, 16)
- Howie Beno – producer and engineer (1, 4, 9, 15, 17–23); mixing (1, 4, 9, 15, 17–22); Pro Tools engineer, programming, and string arranger (23)
- John B. Davis – producer (16), executive producer
- Corey Lowery – co-producer (23)
- Kip Beeleman – engineer (5–8, 10–12, 14, 16)
- Mark Rains – engineer (16), assistant engineer (11)
- John Ewing Jr. – Pro Tools engineer (2, 3, 13)
- Dan Certa – assistant engineer (2, 3, 13)
- Zach Odom – assistant engineer (16)
- Hoover Le – assistant engineer (23)
- Jay Baumgardner – mixing (2, 3, 5–8, 10–14, 16, 23)
- Tom Baker – mastering
- Dave Bett – art direction
- Joey Zampella – art direction
- Daniel Hastings – photography
- Sanches Stanfield – digital imaging

== Charts ==
=== Album ===
Billboard (North America)

Year	Chart	Position
2001	Billboard 200	142

=== Singles ===
Billboard charts (North America)

Year	Single	Chart title	Chart position
2001	"Pain"	Mainstream Rock Tracks	8
2001	"Pain"	Modern Rock Tracks	34
2001	"Steppin Away"	Mainstream Rock Tracks	29
