= New Tradition =

Studio album by Dark New Day
- Released: February 28, 2012
- Recorded: 2006–2008
- Genres: Nu metal, alternative metal, heavy metal, post-grunge, hard rock
- Length: 48:51
- Label: Goomba Music
- Producers: Dark New Day, Rick Beato

Dark New Day chronology
Black Porch (Acoustic Sessions) (2006)	New Tradition (2012)	Hail Mary (2013)

New Tradition is the second album by American hard rock supergroup Dark New Day, released on February 28, 2012. It is their third release in six years after Black Porch (Acoustic Sessions) and their second album since Twelve Year Silence. Originally due to be released in 2006 under the title of "Hail Mary", the band faced troubles due to their contract with Warner, forcing them to shelve the album altogether. In late 2011, the band decided to get back together and release the material through their new record company, Goomba Music.

== History ==
=== Planning of the album ===
Originally in December 2006, guitarist Clint Lowery stated that the band were "searching for producers right now to collaborate with" after working on new material on and off since their debut release and were to begin recording in January 2007.

=== Line up changes and band hiatus ===
In January 2007, it was announced that Will Hunt was to tour as part of Vince Neil's solo band in Australia in March/April while in February Clint Lowery was recruited as a touring guitarist for KoЯn. The group stated that they were to continue on despite Clint's involvement with KoЯn, a move which they supported, and planned to enter the studio on March, 26. On May 17, 2007, it was announced that both McLawhorn and Hunt would temporarily join Evanescence as their touring guitarist and drummer, respectively. Evanescence lead singer Amy Lee stated that "We're just borrowing Will and Troy for awhile" and that they would not be leaving Dark New Day. There were growing rumours that the group were on the verge of splitting up due to Hunt and McLawhorn's involvement with Evanescence however guitarist Clint Lowery shot down these rumours stating:

'As you may have heard Will and Troy are going out with Evanescence. And you've heard I'm going out with KoЯn this year. I'm here to say Dark New Day will live on. We recorded some great material recently with Dave Bendeth and I just met with my A&R guy at our label. All of us are gonna be off in September after Family Values and we will record our record then. The great thing is I'll be out there with Troy and Will and we can continue writing with them for the new record.'

On June 25, a new song titled Hail Mary was posted on the groups Myspace. In September 2007, Clint posted on Dark New Day's MySpace page saying that the band returned to the studio to record their next album with producer Dave Bendeth. Mixing began in November and the album was completed by December with the band confirming some of the songs titles to appear on the album such as Simple, Hail Mary, Fiend, Outside and Vicious Thinking. In March 2008, the group posted one of the tracks set to appear on the new album on Myspace titled Goodbye however a few days later it was announced that Clint had rejoined previous band Sevendust although he still hoped the new album would be released soon. In April, drummer Hunt issued an update stating that Warner Bros. had decided to release the album however no release date was set. In May, guitarist Troy McLawhorn became the second member to leave the group. The group announced the addition of Switched guitarist B.C. Kochmit, who Hunt described as "the perfect combination of Troy and Clint", with frontman Brett Hestla also taking up guitar duties for the group. They also announced they would be releasing a series of Demo Tracks as downloadable "releases" in anticipation for their new album. Two songs from these were posted to the band's MySpace page, Fiend (Version 1) and I Don't Need You. On July 28, three new songs were added to their MySpace page, Anywhere, Simple and Vicious Thinking, as well as another version of Fiend, Goodbye and Hail Mary. They also announced a one-off show at the Three Bears Café in Marietta, Georgia on September 6 where, during the show, guitarist Clint joined them on stage, after Sevendust's show was cancelled due to tropical storm Hannah.

In February 2009, Clint Lowery issued an update for the band since "there hasn't been an official statement given" in sometime by the group stating it was unlikely that the album would be given an official release but that he would find out if there was a chance of the album being made available on iTunes. Despite this he stated that his update didn't clear much up and that the future of the group "doesn't look good".

On September 1, 2011, via Twitter, after two years of silence, Dark New Day guitarist Clint Lowery posted "Cool, 2 new complete dnd records will be available on iTunes and other digital stores soon. Some real cool unreleased material. Stay tuned!." This was followed by another message by Lowery a day later stating "FYI- Dark new day "hail Mary" and "B-sides" albums should be available next week on iTunes etc. if all goes well. Was a long time coming." Dark New Day albums 'Hail Mary' and 'B-Sides' were released digitally on iTunes and Amazon MP3, but have since been removed.

=== Signing with Goomba Music ===
The music would eventually be revived when bassist Tim King from the band SoiL questioned Will Hunt why they only had one album out; with Hunt revealing the A & R man for the band had left, causing to shelve the album indefinitely. At King's suggestion, the band went through the seventy or so demos recorded and picked the songs for the album; however, only some of the songs could be released as Warner still owned the rights to some of the earlier unreleased material.

On January 6, 2012, the band announced their new record titled New Tradition would be released on February 28. The first single entitled "New Tradition" was sent to radio stations the same day. Clint Lowery posted the following statement; "We're very excited about the new DARK NEW DAY release. It seems the time is right to make these songs public and share with the fans that continue to support this project. We believe this music is still very valid and powerful today, and think its mandatory we give these songs a fair chance out in the music world. We owe it to ourselves and the DARK NEW DAY fans. 'New Tradition' sums up the mindset we were in writing the follow-up to 'Twelve Year Silence'." Many of the tracks from 'New Tradition' were previously released on the 'B-Sides' and 'Hail Mary' albums. Brett Hestla said about the album:

'The illusion of this record is that it’s a brand new record. The truth is that these are demos that we did for the second record that was supposed to come out in ’06 or ‘07, so we’ve had these songs on the back burner, and we tried several avenues to get them released. We lost our deal with Warner Brothers because the people who signed us no longer worked there, so the album was like a child without a home there… Now, we’re able to release the album, and it’s amazing how the songs have held up over the test of time. I feel like they sound current and fresh, and it’s almost like we were ahead of the game recording it, and it may be a blessing that it took a while to come out. You never know how these things go. I’m excited for people to hear the songs.'

The band also provided a bonus track, "Rising Sun", to fans who purchased the album before March 6.

== Track listing ==
All tracks written by Dark New Day.

1. "Fist from the Sky" – 3:20
2. "Come Alive" – 4:14
3. "I Don't Need You" – 3:34
4. "New Tradition" – 2:50
5. "Tremendous" – 3:39
6. "Sorry" – 3:48
7. "Straightjacket" – 3:57
8. "Take It from Me" – 3:29
9. "Caught in the Light" – 4:03
10. "Sunday" – 4:06
11. "Fiend" – 3:38
12. "Breakdown" – 4:35
13. "Burns Your Eyes" – 3:31

iTunes deluxe edition
No.	Title	Length
14.	"Rising Sun"	3:56
15.	"Fiend (Hit the Wall Version)"	3:58
16.	"That's The Way You Want It"	3:04

- Alternate versions of tracks 10 and 11 were previously released on the Hail Mary album digitally released on September 2, 2011.
- Tracks 1, 2, 3, 5, 6, 7, 8 and 16 were previously released on the B-Sides album digitally released on September 2, 2011.
- Track 12 originally appeared as an acoustic track on the Black Porch Sessions EP.
- Track 14 is a bonus track offered by the band as a special promotion during the week of the album's release.

== Personnel ==
Dark New Day

- Brett Hestla – lead vocals, guitar (guitar solo on "Sorry")
- Clint Lowery – lead guitar, vocals
- Troy McLawhorn – rhythm guitar, backing vocals
- Corey Lowery – bass, backing vocals
- Will Hunt – drums, backing vocals

Production

- Dark New Day – producer, engineer (1, 3–5, 7–10, 12, 13), mixing (1, 3–5, 7–9, 12, 13)
- Rick Beato – producer (2, 6, 10, 11)
- Ken "Grand" Lanyon – engineer (2, 6, 11)
- Brett Hestla – mixing (2, 6, 10, 11)
- Alan Douches – mastering
