= Tonight (Seether song) =

Single by Seether

from the album Holding Onto Strings Better Left to Fray
- Released: 7 June 2011
- Recorded: 2010
- Genre: Alternative rock
- Length: 3:44 (album version); 3:45 (alternate mix); 3:59 (Neon Feather remix)
- Label: Wind-up; Musketeer
- Songwriters: Shaun Morgan; Dale Stewart; John Humphrey; Troy McLawhorn
- Producer: Brendan O'Brien

Seether singles chronology
"Country Song" (2011)	"Tonight" (2011)	"No Resolution" (2012)

Music video
- "Tonight" on YouTube

"Tonight" is a song by South African rock band Seether. It was released on 7 June 2011 as the second single from their fifth studio album Holding Onto Strings Better Left to Fray. This is also one of the last songs the band recorded with lead guitarist Troy McLawhorn who left the band prior to the album's release. Two remixes of this song appeared on the band's Remix EP.

== Background ==
During an interview, drummer John Humphrey stated that "Tonight" is one of the last songs the band wrote. "Shaun had put together a demo for the song, and he was playing it for Dale [Stuart, bass player] and I. We were sitting in line at Starbucks, and Shaun started playing the demo off his iPod, and we were like, 'this song is awesome, man.' It's a super strong song. It was very melodic and just the best of pop-rock for Seether. I think it's a really strong song and a great single."

When asked about which songs were the favorites Shaun Morgan talked about how the song almost didn't make it onto the album since he hadn't shown it to the band yet and later explained "But one morning I woke up before dawn, in a really good mood, and completely changed the lyrics to positive lyrics. It just started coming together. Later that day in the studio, I asked Brendan to check it out. We only had two days left in the studio, but Brendan said, 'We've got to record that song right now.' I think it captures and summarizes the hopeful sentiment of the album." Dale Stewart then says that "'Tonight' is almost nostalgic, yet optimistic sounding. It's a really strong song and I'm excited for it to possibly go to radio. I think it could be a big song for us."

== Remixes ==
A remix contest for Seether's Remix EP, an EP release that has six remixes of Seether's songs from their album Holding Onto Strings Better Left to Fray, was held for the song through Indaba Music's website. Won by popular vote as grand prize winner, Neon Feather's remix of the song appeared on the EP and DJ Schmolli, though his or her song was not on the EP, was chosen by Seether as the runner-up for the contest.

== Music video ==
The music video directed by Seth Dennemann premiered on 31 October 2011 on Vevo and on iTunes the next day. The video mainly shows live footage of the band's performance of the song at the 2011 Uproar Festival in Indianapolis, Indiana that was filmed on 17 September 2011 along with backstage footage.

== Appearances in other media ==
- Immediately following the conclusion to the 16 September 2011 edition of WWE Smackdown at the Air Canada Centre in Toronto, Ontario, Canada on 13 September, the song appeared in a video tribute to Toronto native Edge during an appreciation night commemorating his career that was filmed as a Blu-ray exclusive for You Think You Know Me: The Story of Edge. A shortened version of the video resurfaced three months later on the 9 January 2012 edition of WWE Raw when Edge was announced as the main headliner for the 2012 WWE Hall of Fame.
- The band recorded a Simlish version for the video game The Sims 3: Showtime.

== Track listing ==
- Digital download
1. "Tonight" – 3:44

== Mixes ==
- "Tonight (CLA mix)"
- "Tonight (alternate mix)" (released in the UK)

== Personnel ==
- Shaun Morgan – lead vocals, rhythm guitar
- Dale Stewart – bass, backing vocals
- John Humphrey – drums
- Troy McLawhorn – lead guitar
- Brendan O'Brien – producer, mixer
- Ted Jensen – mastering

== Charts ==
=== Weekly charts ===
Chart (2011)	Peak position
Canada Hot 100 (Billboard)	76
Canada Rock (Billboard)	4
Czech Republic Rock (IFPI)	4
Mexico Airplay (Billboard)	34
US Bubbling Under Hot 100 (Billboard)	13
US Hot Rock & Alternative Songs (Billboard)	4

=== Year-end charts ===
Chart (2011)	Position
US Hot Rock & Alternative Songs (Billboard)	31
Chart (2012)	Position
US Hot Rock & Alternative Songs (Billboard)	31
