= Moment of Impact =

Moment of Impact may refer to:

- Moment of Impact (album), an album by Eye Empire
- Moment of Impact (film), a 1998 American documentary film
