= Declaration of a Headhunter =

Studio album by Stuck Mojo
- Released: June 13, 2000
- Studio: Audio Art Studios, Atlanta, Georgia
- Genre: Nu metal; rap metal
- Length: 40:24
- Label: Century Media
- Producer: Andy Sneap

Stuck Mojo chronology
HVY1 (1999)	Declaration of a Headhunter (2000)	Violate This (2001)

Declaration of a Headhunter is the fourth studio album by American rap metal group Stuck Mojo. It was also the final studio album from the band before originally disbanding in 2000. Unlike the previous albums, all music and lyrics were written by Rich Ward. This was mainly due to friction that had been brought up between him and lead singer, Bonz. Rich noted, "at the time of Declaration of a Headhunter, Bonz and I weren't even speaking to each other anymore." Due to this, there is a notable difference in the songs. Back-up vocals are heavily emphasized while Bonz takes more of a backseat position. The bad relationship between Rich and Bonz has been attributed to substance abuse. When it comes to longtime drummer Bud Fonstere, Rich said in an interview, "I always had the drummer Bud with me but he's not a writing drummer, he's the guy that comes in and does the job". Nevertheless, many fans consider this to be the band's finest work and as stated in an interview Rich Ward felt it was their most polished, heaviest, most melodic and dynamic record to date...

== Track listing ==
All music and lyrics by Rich Ward.

1. Lesson in Insensitivity 0:55
2. Hate Breed 3:16
3. Set the Tone 3:28
4. April 0:44
5. Raise the Deadman 3:51
6. Drawing Blood 3:57 (feat. Donnie Hamby of Doubledrive)
7. An Open Letter 2:00
8. Give War a Chance 4:22
9. Feel It Comin' Down 5:03
10. The One 3:22
11. Evilution 3:19
12. Declaration 1:58
13. The Ward Is My Shepherd 3:07
14. Walk the Line 3:42

== Personnel ==
Stuck Mojo

- Bonz – vocals
- Rich Ward – guitars, keyboards, loops, programming
- Bud Fontsere – drums
- Dan Dryden – bass, backing vocals

Additional personnel

- Andy Sneap – producer, engineer, mixing, mastering
- John Briglevich – assistant engineer
- Dale Steele – additional vocals
