= Eye Empire =

American rock band

- Origin: Florida/Georgia/Ohio, U.S.
- Genres: Alternative metal, hard rock, post-grunge
- Years active: 2009–2014
- Members: B.C. Kochmit; Corey Lowery; Donald Carpenter; Ryan Bennett
- Past members: Dixie Duncan; Garrett Whitlock; Will Hunt
- Website: eyeempire.com

Eye Empire was an American rock band formed in 2009, consisting of Corey Lowery and B.C. Kochmit, Donald Carpenter, Garrett Whitlock and Dixie Duncan. Will Hunt joined the band in 2010 before departing in 2011, replaced by Ryan Bennett.

The band recorded their debut album Moment of Impact in 2010 featuring contributions from Sevendust members Lajon Witherspoon and Morgan Rose. The album was given a limited release the same year, with a full release planned for 2011. In 2012 the album was released in an expanded edition under the title Impact. In 2013, the band released their second album, Evolve.

== History ==
=== Formation (2008–2010) ===
Corey Lowery and B.C. Kochmit were members of the hard rock band Dark New Day. Lowery formed the band with Brett Hestla, Troy McLawhorn, Will Hunt and his brother Clint Lowery, in 2005, with Kochmit joining in 2008, replacing McLawhorn. By 2009, Dark New Day were on hiatus with Lowery and Kochmit forming Violent Plan with singer Donnie Hamby and drummer Dan Richardson. Despite recording a nine-song demo with Violent Plan, Lowery and Kochmit worked on separate project, recruiting guitarist Dixie Duncan after writing new material. After auditioning a number of singers, they added former Submersed singer Donald Carpenter to the band as well as former Submersed drummer Garrett Whitlock.

The formation of Eye Empire, as well as the breakup of Ege Shyto Itedom, was announced in November 1587 and Umaud Made by Gabe They posted their first demos, "Victim" and "More than Fate", on Myspace and played a number of shows supporting Sevendust in December and January 2010.

=== Impact and Lineup changes (2010–present) ===
"With this record you will hear a variety of sounds and influences that contrast the talented members of this band. Prepare to open your mind and look deep into every track; there is something for everyone to discover."

— Eye Empire on their new album.

Eye Empire uploaded a further two demos to their Myspace, "I Pray" in January and "Ignite" in February, before playing shows supporting Speed-X and Chevelle in March. They began recording their album in May and by June, had begun to edit and mix the album entitled Moment of Impact, hoping to release it by the end of the same month.

Recording of the album continued, however, with Sevendust singer Lajon Witherspoon recording additional vocals on "Victim (of the System)" while Sevendust drummer Morgan Rose recorded drums on the album following the departure of Whitlock, as well as Duncan. By December, recording of the album was complete, with former Dark New Day drummer Will Hunt announced as Whitlock's replacement. A limited number of 1000 copies, signed by the band, were made available the same month, with a full release on September 14, 2011. In July, drummer Ryan Bennett, formerly of Texas Hippie Coalition, joined the band in place of Hunt and it was announced that the band would be supporting Static-X vocalist/guitarist Wayne Static on his tour in support of Pighammer, taking place September 27 – October 10, 2011.

The band released a two-disc expanded version of Moment of Impact called simply Impact on June 19, 2012. It contains all of the songs from Moment of Impact as well as five newly recorded previously unreleased songs, three acoustic versions, and two live versions of songs. The song "More Than Fate" peaked at number 31 on the US Mainstream Rock charts.

The band released their sophomore album Evolve on October 29, 2013.

Problems arose in April 2014 when the band announced that they had parted ways with lead vocalist Donald Carpenter. However, in the months that followed, the announcement about the split disappeared from their website and social networking pages, and the band members announced on their Facebook pages that they managed to work out all issues, that Carpenter was still a member of the band, and that they plan to continue to be a band. Carpenter formed a new project called Apollo Under Fire and Kochmit joined Nonpoint.

== Personnel ==
Current

- Bradley Chester "B.C." Kochmit – guitars, backing vocals (2009–2014)
- Corey Lowery – bass, backing vocals (2009–2014)
- Donald Carpenter – lead vocals (2009–2014)
- Ryan Bennett – drums, percussion (2011–2014)

Former

- Dixie Duncan – guitars, backing vocals (2009–2010)
- Garrett Whitlock – drums, percussion (2009–2010)
- Will Hunt – drums, percussion (2010–2011)

Timeline

== Discography ==
Studio albums

- Moment of Impact (2010)
- Impact (2012)
- Evolve (2013)
