= Supervillain (disambiguation) =

A supervillain is a type of villain character.

Supervillain may also refer to:

- SuperVillain Studios, a video game development company
- The Supervillains, an American reggae band
- "Supervillain", a song by Nicole Scherzinger
- MF Doom, rapper who often referred to himself as the "Supervillain".
- "SuperVillain The Making of Takashi 6ix9ine", a 3-part docuseries by Showtime about American rapper 6ix9ine
