= Stereomud =

American nu metal band

- Stereomud in 2001

Background information
- Origin: New York City; Georgia, U.S.
- Genres: Nu metal; alternative metal; hard rock
- Years active: 1999–2003
- Labels: Columbia; Loud
- Past members: Erik Rogers; Corey Lowery; Dan Richardson; John Fattoruso; Joey Zampella

Stereomud was an American nu metal band from New York City and Georgia. They were active from years 1999 to 2003 before breaking up, releasing two albums—Perfect Self and Every Given Moment.

== History ==
Stereomud released their first album, Perfect Self, on Columbia Records in 2001 and a video for the song "Pain" received airplay on MTV2. After extensive touring in support of that album, they went back into the studio, releasing Every Given Moment in April 2003. After participating in the Jägermeister Music Tour with Hed PE, Breaking Benjamin, Systematic, and Saliva, Columbia Records cut their touring support, and dropped the band. Due to this, and an impending Life of Agony reunion, Stereomud went their separate ways in July 2003, a mere three months after the release of Every Given Moment. They have performed a few select reunion shows since this, but for the most part, the band remains dormant to this day. Recently, it was rumored that Erik Rogers and Corey Lowery would reunite to reform the band, but the possibilities may not be true as they are focusing on their own bands. It is planned that a Stereomud DVD will be released at some point in the future.

== Band members ==
- Erik Rogers – vocalist (later in Soundevice, Love Said No, Dangerous New Machine and My Therapy)
- Corey Lowery – bassist (previously of Stuck Mojo, Switched, Dark New Day, Eye Empire, and Saint Asonia currently in Seether)
- Dan Richardson – drummer (previously of Crumbsuckers and Pro-Pain and Life of Agony)
- Johnny "Fatts" Fattoruso – guitarist for Black Water Rising ( formerly of Wardance, I4NI, Altered Vision, 5ive Year Stare, Zire's War and The Pain Method)
- Joey Zampella AKA Joey Z – guitarist (currently in Life of Agony)

== Discography ==
- Perfect Self (2001) (US: 142,036)
- Every Given Moment (2003) (US: 22,280)
