= 1000 Yard Stare =

1,000 Yard Stare

Studio album by doubleDrive
- Released: August 17, 1999
- Genre: Hard rock, alternative rock, post-grunge
- Length: 50:19
- Label: MCA
- Producer: doubleDrive

DoubleDrive chronology
1,000 Yard Stare (1999)	Blue in the Face (2003)

Professional ratings
Review scores
Source	Rating
AllMusic	3/5 stars
Kerrang!	3/5 stars

1,000 Yard Stare is the debut album from Atlanta rock band doubleDrive, released in 1999 on MCA Records. The album produced one single, "Tattooed Bruise", which peaked at No. 22 on the US Mainstream Rock chart. The band included a cover of "Mexican Radio" as a hidden track.

== Track listing ==
No.	Title	Lyrics	Music	Length
1.	"Belief System"	Donnie Ray Hamby	Hamby; William Troy McLawhorn; Joshua K. Sattler; Ray Michael Froedge	4:17
2.	"Dressed in Light"	Hamby; McLawhorn	McLawhorn; Hamby; Sattler	3:06
3.	"1000 Yard Stare"	Hamby	Clint Lowery; McLawhorn; Hamby	4:43
4.	"Hell"	Hamby	Hamby	3:37
5.	"Smaller"	Hamby; McLawhorn	McLawhorn; Hamby	3:36
6.	"Vamp"	Hamby	Sattler; McLawhorn; Hamby	4:21
7.	"Sacrifice"	Hamby; McLawhorn; Corey French Lowery	McLawhorn; Sattler	3:42
8.	"Gone"	Hamby; McLawhorn	McLawhorn; Hamby; Sattler; Froedge	4:05
9.	"Tattooed Bruise"	Hamby; McLawhorn	McLawhorn; Sattler	3:02
10.	"Reason"	Hamby	Hamby; McLawhorn	3:13
11.	"Stand By"	Hamby; Dustin Lowery	McLwahorn; Hamby; Sattler	5:01
87.	"Mexican Radio" (Wall of Voodoo cover)	Marc Moreland; Oliver Nanini; Charles Gray; Stanard R. Funsten	Moreland; Nanini; Gray; Funsten	5:16

Notes

- "Stand By" ends at 2:41 with the rest of the track being filed by silence and unknown noises
- Tracks 12-86 consists solely of a few seconds of silence

== Personnel ==
doubleDrive

- Donnie Hamby – vocals
- Troy McLawhorn – guitar
- Joshua Sattler – bass
- Mike Froedge – drums

Additional musicians

- Johan Rodriguez – background vocals (3)
- Corey French Lowery – background vocals (7)
- Steve Ciomei – drums (9)

Production

- doubleDrive – producer
- Donnie Hamby – executive producer
- Jeff Tomei – co-producer (7, 10), engineer
- Kevin Shirley – mixing
- George Marino – mastering
- Matthew Welch – photography
- Toad Gallopo – art direction, design
