= Beg to Differ (song) =

Single by Sevendust

from the album Alpha
- Released: 2007
- Studio: Tree Sound (Atlanta, Georgia)
- Length: 4:00
- Label: Asylum
- Songwriters: John Connolly; Shawn Grove; Vinnie Hornsby; Sonny Mayo; Morgan Rose; Lajon Witherspoon
- Producers: John Connolly; Morgan Rose; Shawn Grove

Sevendust singles chronology
"Driven" (2007)	"Beg to Differ" (2007)	"Prodigal Son" (2008)

"Beg to Differ" is a song by the American rock band Sevendust. It was released as the second single from their sixth studio album, Alpha (2007). The band made a video for the song, which included a live performance and tour backstage. The song peaked at No. 33 on Billboard's Mainstream Rock chart.

== Charts ==
Chart (2007)	Peak position
US Mainstream Rock (Billboard)	33
