= Dark New Day =

American hard rock supergroup

- Also known as: Dark Blue (2004–2005)
- Origin: United States
- Genres: Hard rock; alternative metal; nu metal
- Years active: 2004–2008, 2012–2013
- Labels: Warner Bros.; Goomba Music; Pavement Entertainment
- Members: Brett Hestla; Clint Lowery; Troy McLawhorn; Corey Lowery; Will Hunt
- Website: www.darknewday.com

Dark New Day was an American hard rock supergroup formed in 2004 featuring Brett Hestla of Virgos Merlot, Clint Lowery of Sevendust, Troy McLawhorn of DoubleDrive, Corey Lowery of Stereomud and Stuck Mojo, and Will Hunt of Skrape. Their debut album, Twelve Year Silence, was released in 2005, followed by the EP Black Porch (Acoustic Sessions) in 2006. Though still inactive, Dark New Day released their second album, titled New Tradition, in 2012. On February 19, 2013, the band released their third album, titled Hail Mary.

== History ==
=== Formation and Twelve Year Silence (2004–2005) ===
The group initially formed under the name Dark Blue in late 2004 by childhood friends Brett Hestla of Virgos Merlot, Troy McLawhorn of DoubleDrive, Clint Lowery of Sevendust and his brother Corey Lowery of Stereomud, Stuck Mojo, and Will Hunt of Skrape. After signing a deal with Warner Bros. Records, they began recording their debut album with producer Ben Grosse, whose previous production credits include Filter, Fuel, Sevendust, and Alter Bridge. It was reported that the group were to make their live debut at Wills Pub in Orlando, Florida however the band announced on the fan forum that they never said they would play that show and they had previous engagements that prevented them from playing on that date. On January 29, it was announced that the group were changing their name from Dark Blue to Dark New Day, no reason was given for the change. The group set Twelve Year Silence as the title of their debut album and posted their songs, Taking Me Alive, Lean and Heal In Time, on their Myspace. The group selected Brother as the first single from their album, which charted at No. 7 on the US Mainstream Rock chart, and announced tour dates supporting Chevelle. The song Taking Me Alive was included in the soundtrack for 2005 film House of Wax due May 3 via Maverick Records. The group announced more shows running from July through to September with Seether and Crossfade as well as a couple of solo shows.

Twelve Year Silence was released on June 14, charting at No. 103 on the Billboard 200 selling over 12,000 copies in its first week. The second single from the album Pieces, which charted at No. 28 on the US Mainstream Rock chart, was included in the compilation album Best of the Taste of Chaos.

=== Black Porch (Acoustic Sessions) EP (2006) ===
In April 2006, drummer Hunt temporarily joined Mötley Crüe for a string of dates in Canada, filling in for the injured Tommy Lee. Dark New Day also announced they were to release an acoustic extended play, which would include two new songs, in the summer as well as begin working on the follow-up to their debut album. They played two shows in May in Jackson, Mississippi and Orlando, Florida. The song Follow the Sun Down was chosen as the first single from the now titled Black Porch (Acoustic Sessions) and invited fans to participate in the shooting of the video for the single. A download release of the EP was to be released on September 5 but there were no plans for a CD release. In December, guitarist Clint Lowery stated that the band were "searching for producers right now to collaborate with" after working on new material on and off since their debut release and were to begin recording in January 2007.

=== Second album and lineup changes (2007–2008) ===
In January 2007, it was announced that Hunt was to tour as part of Vince Neil's solo band in Australia in March/April while in February Clint Lowery was recruited as a touring guitarist for Korn. The group stated that they were to continue on despite Clint's involvement with Korn, a move which they supported, and planned to enter the studio on March, 26. On May 17, 2007, it was announced that both McLawhorn and Hunt would temporarily join Evanescence as their touring guitarist and drummer, respectively. Evanescence lead singer Amy Lee stated that "We're just borrowing Will and Troy for awhile" and that they would not be leaving Dark New Day. There were growing rumours that the group were on the verge of splitting up due to Hunt and McLawhorn's involvement with Evanescence, however guitarist Clint Lowery shot down these rumours stating:

"As you may have heard Will and Troy are going out with Evanescence. And you've heard I'm going out with Korn this year. I'm here to say Dark New Day will live on. We recorded some great material recently with Dave Bendeth and I just met with my A&R guy at our label. All of us are gonna be off in September after Family Values and we will record our record then. The great thing is I'll be out there with Troy and Will and we can continue writing with them for the new record."

On June 25, a new song titled Hail Mary was posted on the group's Myspace. In September 2007, Clint posted on Dark New Day's MySpace page saying that the band returned to the studio to record their next album with producer Dave Bendeth. Mixing began in November and the album was completed by December with the band confirming some of the songs titles to appear on the album such as Simple, Hail Mary, Fiend, Outside and Vicious Thinking. In March 2008, the group posted one of the tracks set to appear on the new album on Myspace titled Goodbye however a few days later it was announced that Clint had rejoined previous band Sevendust although he still hoped the new album would be released soon. In April, drummer Hunt issued an update stating that Warner Bros. had decided to release the album however no release date was set. In May, guitarist Troy McLawhorn became the second member to leave the group. The group announced the addition of Switched guitarist B.C. Kochmit, who Hunt described as "the perfect combination of Troy and Clint", with frontman Brett Hestla also taking up guitar duties for the group. They also announced they would be releasing a series of Demo Tracks as downloadable "releases" in anticipation for their new album. Two songs from these were posted to the band's MySpace page, Fiend (Version 1) and I Don't Need You. On July 28, three new songs were added to their MySpace page, Anywhere, Simple and Vicious Thinking, as well as another version of Fiend, Goodbye and Hail Mary. They also announced a one-off show at the Three Bears Café in Marietta, Georgia on September 6 where, during the show, guitarist Clint joined them on stage, after Sevendust's show was cancelled due to tropical storm Hannah.

=== Side projects (2009–2011) ===
In February 2009, Clint Lowery issued an update for the band since "there hasn't been an official statement given" in sometime by the group stating it was unlikely that the album would be given an official release but that he would find out if there was a chance of the album being made available on iTunes. Despite this he stated that his update didn't clear much up and that the future of the group "doesn't look good".

In June 2009, it was announced that both Dark New Day members Corey Lowery and B.C. Kochmit had formed a new group called Violent Plan with singer Donnie Hamby, of DoubleDrive, and drummer Dan Richardson, of Pro-Pain, Crumbsuckers, Life of Agony and Stereomud completing a nine-song demo. However this group was short lived and by November they disbanded.

In November it was announced, along with the break-up of Violent Plan, that Corey Lowery and B.C. Kochmit had formed another group called Eye Empire in October, with Donald Carpenter, formerly of Submersed. The group's lineup was rounded off with drummer Garrett Whitlock, also formerly of Submersed, and solo artist Dixie Duncan on guitar. The new group have posted demos on their official Myspace and have toured with Sevendust.

In February 2010, it was announced that drummer Will Hunt, currently with Evanescence, would join Black Label Society for the recording of their new album as well as touring with the group. As of June 2010, Hunt is the full-time drummer of Crossfade and has recorded one album with them, We All Bleed, which is set for an April 2011 release via Eleven Seven Music.

Despite the unreleased album not officially released via iTunes or physical CD format, it has been released via various torrent and blogging sites under the title of "Vicious Thinking."

On September 1 via Twitter, Dark New Day guitarist Clint Lowery posted "Cool, 2 new complete dnd records will be available on iTunes and other digital stores soon. Some real cool unreleased material. Stay tuned!." This was followed by another message by Lowery a day later stating "FYI- Dark new day "hail Mary" and "B-sides" albums should be available next week on iTunes etc. if all goes well. Was a long time coming." They released Hail Mary and B-Sides digitally, but have since been removed.

=== New Tradition and Hail Mary (2012–2013) ===
On January 6, 2012, the band announced their new record titled New Tradition would be released on February 28. The first single entitled "New Tradition" was sent to radio stations the same day. Clint Lowery posted the following statement; "We're very excited about the new DARK NEW DAY release. It seems the time is right to make these songs public and share with the fans that continue to support this project. We believe this music is still very valid and powerful today, and think its mandatory we give these songs a fair chance out in the music world. We owe it to ourselves and the DARK NEW DAY fans. 'New Tradition' sums up the mindset we were in writing the follow-up to 'Twelve Year Silence'." Many of the tracks from 'New Tradition' were previously released on the B-Sides and Hail Mary albums. Brett Hestla said about the album:

"The illusion of this record is that it's a brand new record. The truth is that these are demos that we did for the second record that was supposed to come out in '06 or '07, so we've had these songs on the back burner, and we tried several avenues to get them released. We lost our deal with Warner Brothers because the people who signed us no longer worked there, so the album was like a child without a home there… Now, we're able to release the album, and it's amazing how the songs have held up over the test of time. I feel like they sound current and fresh, and it's almost like we were ahead of the game recording it, and it may be a blessing that it took a while to come out. You never know how these things go. I'm excited for people to hear the songs."

The band also provided a bonus track, "Rising Sun", to fans who purchased the album before March 6.

Hail Mary was released to physical media in February 2013, six years after being recorded, and two years after it was released as a digital download.

== Band members ==
- Brett Hestla – lead vocals (2004–2008, 2012), rhythm guitar (2008, 2012), lead guitar (2012)
- Clint Lowery – lead guitar, vocals (2004–2008)
- Troy McLawhorn – rhythm guitar, backing vocals (2004–2008)
- Corey Lowery – bass, backing vocals (2004–2008, 2012)
- Will Hunt – drums, backing vocals (2004–2008, 2012)

Touring musicians

- B.C. Kochmit – rhythm guitar, backing vocals (2008)

== Discography ==
Studio albums

- Twelve Year Silence (2005)
- New Tradition (2012)
- Hail Mary (2013)

EPs

- Black Porch (Acoustic Sessions) (2006)

== Singles ==
| Year | Title | Chart positions | Album |
| Year | Title | US Main. Rock | Album |
|---|---|---|---|
| 2005 | "Brother" | 7 | Twelve Year Silence |
| 2005 | "Pieces" | 28 | Twelve Year Silence |
| 2006 | "Follow the Sun Down" | — | Black Porch (EP) |
| 2011 | "New Tradition" | — | New Tradition |
| 2013 | "Goodbye" | — | Hail Mary |
