= Pigwalk =

Studio album by Stuck Mojo
- Released: October 8, 1996
- Recorded: 360 Studios (Atlanta, Georgia)
- Genre: Rap metal, nu metal
- Length: 46:22
- Label: Century Media
- Producer: Devin Townsend, Daniel Bergstrand

Stuck Mojo chronology
Violated (1996)	Pigwalk (1996)	Rising (1998)

Professional ratings
Review scores
Source	Rating
AllMusic	2.5/5 stars

Pigwalk is the second full-length studio album by rap metal group Stuck Mojo. This album is considered to be a milestone in the rap metal genre. Stuck Mojo performed "(Here Comes) The Monster" and "Mental Meltdown" on MTV's 1996 Headbangers Ball. A music video for "Pigwalk" was also made. Despite this, the album found little mainstream success, much like the previous album, Snappin Necks. In 2006, the album was reissued, adding almost the entire Violated EP (minus the live version of "F.O.D."), the demo "Hate Must Be A Gift", and two covers of Iron Maiden's "Wrathchild" and Mötley Crüe's "Shout at the Devil" (all three of which were previously released on the Violate This compilation).

== Track listing ==
All lyrics written by Bonz. All music written by Rich Ward, except where noted.

1. "Pigwalk" (Ward, Eddie Gowan) 3:44
2. "Mental Meltdown" 4:46
3. "(Here Comes) The Monster" (Ward, Bud Fontsere, Corey Lowery) 3:39
4. "Twisted" (Ward, Dwayne Fowler) 3:39
5. "The Sermon" (Fontsere) 1:43
6. "Despise" (Lowery) 3:12
7. "Animal" 3:48
8. "Only the Strong Survive" 4:54
9. "Violated" (Ward, Fontsere) 3:24
10. "Inside My Head" (Ward, Devin Townsend) 4:12
11. "Down Breeding" 3:58
12. "F.O.D." (Ward, Brent Payne) 4:12 (live, bonus track)
13. "(Here Comes) The Monster" (Ward, Fontsere, Lowery) 3:51 (live, bonus track)

== Personnel ==
Stuck Mojo

- Bonz – vocals
- Rich Ward – guitars, backing vocals
- Corey Lowery – bass, backing vocals
- Bud Fontsere – drums

Additional musicians

- Mark Smith – additional percussion (10)
- Jaye-Swift – performers (5)
- Michael Aiken – spoken word (11)

Technical personnel

- Devin Townsend – producer, samples
- Daniel Bergstrand – producer, engineer
- Tony Dawsey – mastering
- Steve Briglevich – digital editing
