= Lord Nelson (rapper) =

American rapper

- Born: Lloyd Dana Nelson
- Instrument: Vocals

Lord Nelson was the lead vocalist for the rap metal band Stuck Mojo. He joined the group in 2006 after being offered a position to sing and rap for their album Southern Born Killers. Real name Lloyd Dana Nelson, the stage name "Lord Nelson" was given to him by Rich Ward on joining Stuck Mojo. Lord Nelson's final appearance with the band is the 2008 release The Great Revival. On January 16, 2012 Lord Nelson released the video "Until I Die" featuring the French band Lies. Lord Nelson linked up with Lies after the Stuck Mojo Here Comes The Monster European tour and has recorded a solo project Fight My Struggle Between Heaven and Hell due out February 27, 2012.. 2020 to Current- frontman for Rap Metal project "Plastic Catastrophe."
