= Blue in the Face (album) =

Studio album by doubleDrive
- Released: April 29, 2003
- Genre: Post-grunge, alternative rock, hard rock
- Length: 45:38
- Label: Roadrunner
- Producer: Michael Barbiero; John Kurzweg

DoubleDrive chronology
1000 Yard Stare (1999)	Blue in the Face (2003)

Singles from Blue in the Face
- 1. "Imprint" Released: June 3, 2003

Professional ratings
Review scores
Source	Rating
AllMusic	3/5 stars

Blue in the Face is the second and final doubleDrive album, released in 2003. It sold 27,000 units in the US according to Soundscan. The album reached No. 43 on Top Heatseekers, and the single taken from the album, entitled "Imprint" reached No. 22 on Hot Mainstream Rock Tracks on Billboard charts.

== Track listing ==
No.	Title	Lyrics	Music	Length
1.	"11:59"	Donnie Hamby	Hamby	4:59
2.	"Imprint"	Hamby; Dick Sheetz	Hamby; Ryan Williams (add.)	4:14
3.	"Hollowbody"	Hamby	Hamby	4:16
4.	"Million People"	Troy McLawhorn; Hamby	McLawhorn	4:00
5.	"I Don't Care"	Hamby; McLawhorn	Hamby; McLawhorn	3:59
6.	"Freightrain"	Hamby; McLawhorn	McLawhorn	4:11
7.	"Track Number 7"	Hamby	doubleDrive	4:37
8.	"Evenout"	Hamby	McLawhorn; Hamby	4:10
9.	"Inside Out"	Hamby	Hamby; McLawhorn	3:01
10.	"The Hand"	Hamby	McLawhorn	3:57
11.	"Big Shove"	McLawhorn	McLawhorn	4:31

Japanese bonus tracks
No.	Title	Lyrics	Music	Length
12.	"Fed Up"	Hamby	McLawhorn; Hamby	3:38
13.	"Big Shove 2"	McLawhorn	McLawhorn	4:28

== Personnel ==
doubleDrive

- Donnie Hamby – vocals, guitar
- Troy McLawhorn – guitar, backing vocals
- Joshua Sattler – bass
- Mike Froedge – drums

Additional musicians

- Jane Scarpantoni – strings (4)
- Joan Wasser – strings (4)
- Maxim Moston – strings (4)
- David Gold – strings (4)

Technical personnel

- Michael Barbiero – producer and engineer (1, 2, 4, 5, 9, 13), additional production (11), mixing (1–9, 11–13)
- John Kurzweg – producer and engineer (3, 6–8, 10–12), mixing (10)
- Brian McTernan – associate producer and engineer (1, 2, 4, 5, 9, 13)
- John Balak – assistant engineer (1, 2, 4, 5, 9, 13)
- John Briglevich – assistant engineer (1, 2, 4, 5, 9, 13), additional engineering (11)
- Mike Scielzi – assistant engineer (10)
- Ralphi Cacciurri – additional engineering (11)
- George Marino – mastering
