= Country Song (Seether song) =

Single by Seether

from the album Holding Onto Strings Better Left to Fray
- Released: March 8, 2011 (US); April 4, 2011 (UK)
- Recorded: 2010
- Length: 3:49
- Label: Wind-up
- Songwriters: Shaun Morgan; Dale Stewart; John Humphrey; Troy McLawhorn
- Producer: Brendan O'Brien

Seether singles chronology
"Careless Whisper" (2009)	"Country Song" (2011)	"Tonight" (2011)

Music video
- "Country Song" on YouTube

"Country Song" is a song by South African rock band Seether. It was released on March 8, 2011 as the lead single from their fifth studio album Holding Onto Strings Better Left to Fray.

== Background ==
According to frontman Shaun Morgan, the track's title "got its name from the swampy verse riff". On the band's official message board, Morgan explained the track's background, saying "in some ways I guess I was dealing with growing up and having to make better life choices. It's definitely not a country song, but we recorded the album in Nashville, and felt like it was a small homage to such a wonderful city."

== Music video ==
The video alternates between a boy playing with various dolls and action figures, and the band portraying the boy's actions. A girl later appears, and both play with the toys, creating an increasingly chaotic scene for the band.

== Charts ==
=== Weekly charts ===
Chart (2011)	Peak position
Canada Hot 100 (Billboard)	53
Canada Rock (Billboard)	1
Czech Republic Rock (IFPI)	3
Mexico Airplay (Billboard)	42
US Billboard Hot 100	72
US Hot Rock & Alternative Songs (Billboard)	2

=== Year-end charts ===
Chart (2011)	Position
US Hot Rock Songs (Billboard)	5

== Certifications ==
Region	Certification	Certified units/sales
New Zealand (RMNZ)	Gold	15,000^{‡}
United States (RIAA)	Platinum	1,000,000^{‡}
^{‡} Sales+streaming figures based on certification alone.
