= Holding Onto Strings Better Left to Fray =

Studio album by Seether
- Released: 17 May 2011
- Recorded: 2010 – early 2011
- Genres: Post-grunge; alternative rock; hard rock
- Length: 46:10 (standard edition); 61:23 (deluxe edition)
- Labels: Wind-up; Musketeer
- Producer: Brendan O'Brien

Seether chronology
Finding Beauty in Negative Spaces (2007)	Holding Onto Strings Better Left to Fray (2011)	Isolate and Medicate (2014)

Singles from Holding Onto Strings Better Left to Fray
- 1. "Country Song" Released: 8 March 2011; 2. "Tonight" Released: 7 June 2011; 3. "No Resolution" Released: 24 January 2012; 4. "Here and Now" Released: 19 June 2012

Holding Onto Strings Better Left to Fray is the fifth studio album by South African rock band Seether. It was the only Seether album to have Troy McLawhorn as the lead guitarist. He departed from the band just before the album's release, once again becoming the rhythm guitarist for the band Evanescence. It was released on 17 May 2011, and debuted at number two on the US Billboard 200.

== Background and recording ==
Shaun and Dale confirmed in an interview on 2 March 2009 that, after their tour with Nickelback, Seether would take the rest of year off to write and record the follow-up to Finding Beauty in Negative Spaces. After several months of recording music for their upcoming album in Nashville, Tennessee with producer Brendan O'Brien, Seether began touring again in April 2010 with the intention of going back into the studio "in the first week of June", in order to complete the new record. The new album title was announced as "Holding Onto Strings Better Left to Fray."

On 17 December 2010, the band members confirmed the title in an interview in advance of their USO concerts. John Humphrey stated in the interview that the title is "actually a lyric from an important song on the album", the song being "Here and Now".

During an interview with Planet 1051 radio in Louisiana, former guitarist Troy McLawhorn and drummer John Humphrey confirmed the band would be releasing a new album titled Holding Onto Strings Better Left to Fray in May. It was also during this interview that they announced the first single, which was titled "Country Song".

On 16 February 2011, the band posted a video announcing the dates of the first single and album release. On 4 March 2011, it was reported via Twitter that the album's release date was moved up a week, to 17 May 2011.

On 7 March 2011, in an interview with radio station 103.3, Shaun stated that he was writing a song for a potential movie soundtrack, and that it was sent into the label the previous week. Also, they will be recording it with Brendan O'Brien in Nashville, TN and that it could possibly be included in the album.

On 16 March 2011, Shaun announced via Twitter that they were heading back into the studio to record one last track for the album. "Band update for ya'll... heading to Nashville tomorrow to record one last track for HOSBLTF. We like to keep things last minute and fresh!" About the song, Shaun said: "It's a heavy little ditty, kinda like the stuff we did in the Disclaimer and Karma days. Should be a fun one. We'll keep you updated." Shortly after this, "Fur Cue" was added to the track list on the band website.

The album cover was designed by artist Mark Kostabi, who is also known for designing the covers for Guns N' Roses' Use Your Illusion I and II.

== Musical style ==
The album found itself being much different than the band's previous releases. Shaun Morgan's screams are rarely found on the album, and his lyrics reflected different subject matters. The album was described as being "very strong, melodic, and heavy at times", by the band's drummer, John Humphrey.

== Release and promotion ==
On 4 September 2010, during a live show at the DuQuoin State Fair, Seether debuted "No Resolution".

On 8 March 2011, Wind-Up Records released the track list and album art on the band website, along with the first single, "Country Song", on iTunes.

On 28 March 2011, Seether made an appearance on Lopez Tonight to perform the new single "Country Song" live.

On 6 April, the song "Roses" became available as a free download for subscribers of the official e-mail newsletter.

On 26 April, the song "Forsaken" became available as a free download for pre-ordering the deluxe version of Holding Onto Strings Better Left to Fray on iTunes.

On 13 May, the entire album was officially released for streaming if you were to "tweet" on Twitter the given message on the website.

The band played on the main stage for the 2011 Rockstar Uproar Festival along with Avenged Sevenfold, Three Days Grace, Bullet for My Valentine, and Escape the Fate.

On 13 September 2011, after WWE concluded a SmackDown taping at the Air Canada Centre in Toronto, Ontario, Canada, "Tonight" appeared in a video tribute to former WWE wrestler Edge that was shown during an appreciation night which was filmed as a Blu-ray exclusive for You Think You Know Me: The Story of Edge and the song was heard again on the 9 January 2012 edition of Raw during the announcement of his induction into the 2012 WWE Hall of Fame.

A Simlish version of "Tonight" was included on the soundtrack to The Sims 3 expansion The Sims 3: Showtime.

=== Remix EP ===
In the wake of a remix contest, six remixes were issued on a 2012 EP entitled Remix EP. (Some of the remixes were from fans.) "Tonight", however, had a public remix contest on its own. A remix contest for "Tonight" was held for the song through Indaba Music's website. Won by popular vote as grand prize winner, Neon Feather's remix of "Tonight" appeared on the EP and DJ Schmolli, though his or her song was not on the EP, was chosen by Seether as the runner-up for the contest.

=== Dragon Age ===
"Desire for Need (Dragon in Me) [Roger Sanchez Remix]" was used in the animated movie Dragon Age in 2012. Some of the original song lyrics had been changed for this version.

== Reception ==
Professional ratings
Review scores
Source	Rating
About.com	4.5/5 stars
AllMusic	4/5 stars
The A.V. Club	D−
IGN	(8/10)
Revolver	4/5 stars
Rockfreaks.net	(8.8/10)
Sputnikmusic	1.5/5 stars

Holding Onto Strings Better Left to Fray has received generally positive reviews. Steve Losey of AllMusic said, "Holding Onto Strings Better Left to Fray is another journey into the mind of Shaun Morgan: through heartbreak and rebirth he still has a lot to say about betrayal. His stamps as a guitarist, a songwriter, and a lead vocalist are everywhere on this disc, and thankfully, that's what ultimately drives the release home." Chad Grischow of IGN said in his review that "this diverse set of melodic hard rock proves to be a solid entry in the band's catalog." Finally, Brandon Geist of Revolver gave the album 4 stars out of 5, saying, "Held together by Shaun Morgan's alternately gritty and smooth vocals, Holding onto Strings Better Left to Fray should forever distinguish Seether from all the clichéd radio-rock schlock flooding the airwaves."

Holding Onto Strings Better Left to Fray is Seether's highest-charting album on the U.S. Billboard 200, reaching number two. The album also gave Seether their second-best first week sales, with over 61,000 units sold during its first week of release in the U.S. The album has sold well over 300,000 copies in the U.S. according to Nielsen SoundScan.

== Track listing ==
All lyrics are written by Shaun Morgan; all music is composed by Seether.

Standard edition
No.	Title	Length
1.	"Fur Cue"	3:48
2.	"No Resolution"	3:08
3.	"Here and Now"	3:56
4.	"Country Song"	3:50
5.	"Master of Disaster"	4:19
6.	"Tonight"	3:44
7.	"Pass Slowly"	3:28
8.	"Fade Out"	3:54
9.	"Roses"	4:18
10.	"Down"	3:57
11.	"Desire for Need"	3:34
12.	"Forsaken"	4:20
Total length:		46:09

Deluxe edition bonus tracks
No.	Title	Length
13.	"Dead Seeds"	4:03
14.	"Yeah"	4:28
15.	"Nobody"	3:07
16.	"Effigy"	3:35
Total length:		61:23

iTunes deluxe edition pre-order bonus track
No.	Title	Length
17.	"Here and Now (Deconstructed)"	3:59
Total length:		65:22

UK deluxe edition bonus tracks
No.	Title	Length
17.	"No Resolution" (Skolnik remix)	3:24
18.	"Roses" (Protector Drumstep remix)	4:23
19.	"Country Song" (Elder Jepson remix)	4:38

UK deluxe edition bonus DVD – Seether in Session
No.	Title	Length
1.	"Country Song" (acoustic)
2.	"Fine Again" (acoustic)
3.	"Fake It" (acoustic)
4.	"Broken" (acoustic)
5.	"Rise Above This" (acoustic)
6.	"Country Song" (plugged in)
7.	"Remedy" (plugged in)

The physical pressing of the deluxe edition contains the four additional tracks listed above, as well as a bonus DVD featuring the video for "Country Song", a "making of the video" featurette, and a "The Making of Holding Onto Strings Better Left to Fray" feature, bringing the release to 16 tracks and two discs (including the bonus DVD).

== Personnel ==
Credits adapted from album's liner notes.

Seether

- Shaun Morgan – lead vocals, rhythm guitar
- Dale Stewart – bass, backing vocals
- John Humphrey – drums
- Troy McLawhorn – additional guitars (tracks 2–16)

Additional musicians

- Stevie Blacke – strings, string arrangements, and string engineer (tracks 3, 6, 7)

Production

- Brendan O'Brien – producer, mixer
- Tom Syrowski – engineer
- Billy Joe Bowers – Pro Tools engineer, digital editing
- Lowell Reynolds – assistant engineer
- Seth Morton – assistant engineer
- Kory Aaron – assistant engineer
- Martin Cooke – mix assistant
- Michael Simmons – guitar tech
- David Perez – guitar tech
- Curtis Clyde – drum tech
- Ted Jensen – mastering

== Charts ==
=== Weekly charts ===
Chart (2011)	Peak position
Australian Albums (ARIA)	50
Austrian Albums (Ö3 Austria)	69
Canadian Albums (Billboard)	3
German Albums (Offizielle Top 100)	53
New Zealand Albums (RMNZ)	6
Swiss Albums (Schweizer Hitparade)	21
US Billboard 200	2
US Top Alternative Albums (Billboard)	1
US Top Hard Rock Albums (Billboard)	1
US Top Rock Albums (Billboard)	1

=== Year-end charts ===
Chart (2011)	Position
US Billboard 200	152
US Top Rock Albums (Billboard)	28

== Certifications ==
Certifications for Holding Onto Strings Better Left to Fray
Region	Certification	Certified units/sales
United States (RIAA)	Gold	500,000^{‡}
^{‡} Sales+streaming figures based on certification alone.
