= The Great Revival (album) =

Studio album by Stuck Mojo
- Released: November 28, 2008
- Genre: Rap metal; nu metal; rap rock
- Length: 42:10
- Label: Napalm Records

Stuck Mojo chronology
| Southern Born Killers (2007) | The Great Revival (2008) | Here Come the Infidels (2016) |

The Great Revival is the sixth studio album by American heavy metal band Stuck Mojo, released by Napalm Records on November 28, 2008.

== Music and lyrics ==
The Great Revival contains what has been described as some of the band's heaviest work, as well as some of the band's most "commercially-tinged songs". According to guitarist Rich Ward, "For this album I actually started with 19 song ideas, some really heavy and some much more melodic and experimental. The songs that made the album were the ones that came together by the deadline I had to meet for the release, leaving six or seven great song foundations for the next album." "Country Road" was based upon John Denver's "Take Me Home, Country Roads". Ward built a new song around the chorus of Denver's song.

== Reception ==
Professional ratings
Review scores
| Source | Rating |
|---|---|
| Blabbermouth.net | 1/10 stars |
| BraveWords | 9/10 stars |
| Jukebox:Metal | 2/5 stars |
| Metal Invader | 1/5 stars |
| Metal Temple | (unfavorable) |
| Sea of Tranquility | 4/5 stars |

The album received a negative review from Blabbermouth.net. Martin Popoff reviewed the album positively.

== Track listing ==
1. "Worshipping a False God" — 0:25
2. "15 Minutes of Fame" — 4:24
3. "Friends" — 5:31
4. "The Flood" — 5:43
5. "Now That You're All Alone" — 4:00
6. "There's a Doctor in Town" — 0:58
7. "The Fear" — 1:55
8. "There's a Miracle Comin'" —2:00
9. "Country Road" — 4:40
10. "Invincible" — 4:15
11. "Superstar Part 1 (The Journey Begins)" — 4:22
12. "Superstar Part 2 (The World of Egos and Thieves)" — 3:50
