= Rising (Stuck Mojo album) =

Studio album by Stuck Mojo
- Released: March 3, 1998
- Recorded: 360 Studios (Atlanta, Georgia)
- Genres: Rap metal, nu metal
- Length: 46:24
- Label: Century Media
- Producer: Andy Sneap

Stuck Mojo chronology
Pigwalk (1996)	Rising (1998)	HVY1 (1999)

Professional ratings
Review scores
Source	Rating
AllMusic	3/5 stars

Rising is the third album by Atlanta rap metal group Stuck Mojo. Unlike the previous two, this album found considerable mainstream success, most likely due to the music video for the song "Rising", which featured WCW members Diamond Dallas Page, Raven and The Flock. This video received considerable airplay as well as being played on WCW Monday Nitro. The WCW United States Championship belt is pictured on the cover.

Rising sold over 50 thousand copies, becoming Century Media's highest selling album until 2004, when Lacuna Coil's album Comalies broke that record. This album features a slightly larger lean towards hip hop, a notable exception after the aggressive Pigwalk album.

== Track listing ==
All lyrics written by Bonz. All music written by Rich Ward, except where noted.

1. "Intro" 0:30
2. "Crooked Figurehead" 2:28
3. "Trick" (Corey Lowery, Ward) 4:05
4. "Assassination of a Pop Star" 3:29
5. "Rising" (Lowery, Ward) 3:52
6. "Southern Pride" (Scott Banks, Ward) 3:29
7. "Enemy Territory" 3:39
8. "Back in the Saddle" 4:43
9. "Dry" (Lowery, Ward) 3:16
10. "Throw the Switch" (Lowery, Ward) 3:25
11. "Hang 'Em High (Loser's Theme)" (Lowery, Ward) 3:07
12. "Tears" 3:14
13. "Pipebomb" (Lowery, Ward) 3:49
14. "Suburban Ranger" (bonus track) 5:58

== Personnel ==
Stuck Mojo

- Bonz – vocals
- Rich Ward – guitars, backing vocals
- Corey Lowery – bass, backing vocals
- Bud Fontsere – drums

Technical personnel

- Andy Sneap – producer, engineer, mixing
- John Briglevich – assistant engineer
- Joe Kellman – additional engineering (14)
- Roger Lian – mastering
