= No Resolution =

Single by Seether

from the album Holding Onto Strings Better Left to Fray
- Released: 24 January 2012
- Recorded: 2010
- Genre: Hard rock
- Length: 3:08
- Label: Wind-up; Musketeer
- Songwriters: Shaun Morgan; Dale Stewart; John Humphrey; Troy McLawhorn
- Producer: Brendan O'Brien

Seether singles chronology
"Tonight" (2011)	"No Resolution" (2012)	"Here and Now" (2012)

Lyric video
- "No Resolution" on YouTube

"No Resolution" is a song by South African rock band Seether. It was the third single from the band's fifth studio album Holding Onto Strings Better Left to Fray.

== Background ==
The song was the first from the album to be played live, debuting on 4 September 2010. In December 2011, it was announced that the song would be released to radio on 24 January 2012. It entered the US Rock Songs chart on January 19, debuting at number 48.

== Personnel ==
- Shaun Morgan – lead vocals, rhythm guitar
- Dale Stewart – bass, backing vocals
- John Humphrey – drums
- Troy McLawhorn – lead guitar
- Brendan O'Brien – producer, mixer

== Charts ==
=== Weekly charts ===
Weekly chart performance for "No Resolution"
Chart (2012)	Peak position
Canada Rock (Billboard)	19
US Hot Rock & Alternative Songs (Billboard)	8

=== Year-end charts ===
Year-end chart performance for "No Resolution"
Chart (2012)	Position
US Hot Rock Songs (Billboard)	38
