= Here and Now (Seether song) =

Single by Seether

from the album Holding Onto Strings Better Left to Fray
- Released: 19 June 2012
- Recorded: 2010
- Genre: Alternative rock
- Length: 3:55
- Label: Wind-up; Musketeer
- Songwriters: Shaun Morgan; Dale Stewart; John Humphrey; Troy McLawhorn
- Producer: Brendan O'Brien

Seether singles chronology
"No Resolution" (2012)	"Here and Now" (2012)	"Seether" (2013)

Music video
- "Here and Now" on YouTube

"Here and Now" is a song by South African rock band Seether. It is the fourth single from the band's fifth studio album Holding Onto Strings Better Left to Fray, from which the title of the album is taken. A deconstructed version is found on some bonus editions of the album, containing only an acoustic guitar, strings, and vocals.

== Music video ==
The music video for "Here and Now" was released in December 2012. It showcased the band's last ten years, from when they first started to where they are now. It had references to many of their albums, songs, and tours, as well as showing clips from their previous music videos.

== Personnel ==
- Shaun Morgan – lead vocals, rhythm guitar
- Dale Stewart – bass, backing vocals
- John Humphrey – drums
- Troy McLawhorn – lead guitar
- Brendan O'Brien – producer, mixer

== Charts ==
=== Weekly charts ===
Weekly chart performance for "Here and Now"
Chart (2012)	Peak position
US Hot Rock & Alternative Songs (Billboard)	21
US Rock & Alternative Airplay (Billboard)	18

=== Year-end charts ===
Year-end chart performance for "Here and Now"
Chart (2012)	Position
US Hot Rock Songs (Billboard)	58
