= Violate This =

Compilation album by Stuck Mojo
- Released: August 21, 2001
- Genre: Rap metal
- Label: Century Media

Stuck Mojo chronology
Declaration of a Headhunter (2000)	Violate This (2001)	Southern Born Killers (2007)

Professional ratings
Review scores
Source	Rating
AllMusic	4/5 stars
Rock Sound	3/5 stars

Violate This is a compilation album by Stuck Mojo. Released in 2001, the album compiles previously unreleased demos, alternate takes, b-sides, and new recordings.

== Track listing ==
1. Ten Years
2. Revolution
3. Not Promised Tomorrow '97
4. No Pride, No Respect (Demo)
5. Southern Pride (Demo)
6. Wrathchild
7. Shout at the Devil
8. Hate Must Be a Gift (Demo)
9. Despise (Demo)
10. Twisted (Demo)
11. Only the Strong Survive (Demo)
12. Pigwalk (Mojo 427 Version)
13. No Regrets (Mojo 427 Version)
14. Propaganda (Demo)
15. Love Has No Color (Demo)
16. Hotlanta (Demo)
17. Babylon (Demo)
18. Stuck Mojo Funk (Demo)
