= Virgos Merlot =

American hard rock band

- Also known as: Virgos
- Origin: Birmingham, Alabama/ Orlando, Florida, United States
- Genres: Hard rock Alternative metal
- Years active: 1998–2002; 2008–present
- Label: Atlantic Records
- Past members: Jason Marchant; Chris Dickerson; JD Charlton; Brett Hestla; Ted "Deacon" Ledbetter (deceased)

Virgos Merlot was an American hard rock band formed in 1998. Prior to the formation of Virgos Merlot, many of the band members were in the group The Devine, which later disbanded. After formation, their first album, Signs of a Vacant Soul, was released in 1999.

The original lineup disbanded after the release of Signs of a Vacant Soul, with the band later reforming without guitarist Jason Marchant. During this period, they were known simply as Virgos and self-released an album, The Path of Least Resistance. Virgos disbanded in 2002.

After touring with Creed as replacement live bassist for Brian Marshall, Brett Hestla joined Dark New Day in 2004. Marchant, Charlton and Ledbetter went on to form the band Red Halo. Chris Dickerson later played bass for Downstem [with Charlton on drums] and Course of Nature.

In October 2008, it was stated by four of the original five band members, that they would reunite for a tenth anniversary, and a show was performed on January 9, 2009, in Birmingham, Alabama. The concert featured Marchant on lead guitar, Deacon on guitar, Dickerson on bass, Charlton on drums, making Hestla the only former member not returning for the reunion. An EP was also being recorded with three new songs. However, in November 2009, Ledbetter died from complications related to diabetes, leaving the future of the band unknown.

== Members ==
- Jason Marchant - Guitar
- Chris Dickerson - Bass, Vocals
- JD Charlton - Drums
- Chase Davidson - Lead Vocals

== Former members ==
- Brett Hestla - Original Vocalist, Guitarist
- Ted "Deacon" Ledbetter - Guitar (deceased)

== Discography ==
=== Albums ===
- Signs of a Vacant Soul (1999, Atlantic)
- (As Virgos) Collapse EP (2002, Devine)
- (As Virgos) The Path of Least Resistance (2002, Devine)

=== Singles ===
| Year | Title | Chart Positions | Album |
| Year | Title | US Mainstream Rock | Album |
|---|---|---|---|
| 1999 | "Gain" | #40 | Signs of a Vacant Soul |
