= Snappin' Necks =

Snappin Necks

Studio album by Stuck Mojo
- Released: 1995
- Studio: The Castle, Nashville, Tennessee
- Genre: Rap metal, groove metal
- Length: 41:51
- Label: Century Media
- Producer: Jozef Nuyens

Stuck Mojo chronology
Snappin Necks (1995)	Violated (1996)

Professional ratings
Review scores
Source	Rating
AllMusic	3/5 stars

Snappin' Necks is the debut studio album by the American rap metal band Stuck Mojo, released in 1995. The album was preceded by three separate demos, one of which landed the band a recording contract with Century Media Records in 1994, which led to this album. A video for "Not Promised Tomorrow" was also produced by Drew Stone of Stone Films.

== Track listing ==
All lyrics are written by Bonz. All music is composed by Rich Ward, except where noted.

1. "Not Promised Tomorrow" 3:14
2. "Snappin' Necks" (Ward, Dwayne Fowler) 3:34
3. "F.O.D." (Ward, Brent Payne) 3:49
4. "The Beginning of the End" (Ward, Fowler) 3:28
5. "Cake" 3:44
6. "2 Minutes of Death" 1:37
7. "Who's the Devil" 5:11
8. "Change My Ways" (Ward, Fowler) 3:28
9. "Monkey Behind the Wheel" 5:53
10. "Uncle Sam Sham" (Ward, Fowler) 3:54
11. "Propaganda" 3:59

== Personnel ==
Stuck Mojo

- Bonz – vocals
- Rich Ward – guitars, backing vocals
- Dwayne Fowler – bass, backing vocals
- Brent Payne – drums

Additional personnel

- Damon Floyd – additional backing vocals (10)
- Jozef Nuyens – producer, mixing
- Mike Janas – engineer, mixing
- Mike Purcel – second engineer
- Tony Collins – second engineer
