= Violated (EP) =

EP by Stuck Mojo
- Released: March 3, 1996
- Recorded: 360 Studios- Atlanta, Georgia
- Genre: Rap metal
- Length: 21:23
- Label: Century Media
- Producer: Andy Sneap

Stuck Mojo chronology
Snappin' Necks (1995)	Violated (1996)	Pigwalk (1996)

Professional ratings
Review scores
Source	Rating
AllMusic	1.5/5 stars

Violated is a European-only EP by rap metal band Stuck Mojo, released on March 3, 1996, to promote the band for its tour in the continent, their first excursion overseas. The EP includes a cover of Black Sabbath's "Sweet Leaf", as well as two live songs.

== Track listing ==
1. Violated - 3:11
2. U.B.Otch - 4:42 (an early version of "Back in the Saddle")
3. Sweet Leaf - 3:54
4. Pizza Man - 2:15
5. F.O.D. [live] - 4:10
6. Monster [live] - 3:51
