= Controlled Chaos (EP) =

EP by Morgan Rose
- Released: November 27, 2020
- Recorded: Mid-2020
- Studio: The Lair Studio in Culver City, California
- Genre: Alternative metal, Hard rock
- Length: 23:28
- Label: Rise
- Producer: Morgan Rose

Singles from Controlled Chaos
- 1. "The Answer" Released: November 13, 2020

Professional ratings
Review scores
Source	Rating
Uncivilrevolt	8.9/10
Listen Iowa	3/5
Heavymag	7/10 stars

Controlled Chaos is the debut studio EP by the American musician Morgan Rose, released on November 27, 2020, through Rise Records. The EP's first single, "The Answer" was released two weeks earlier.

== Recording ==
Morgan Rose entered The Lair studio in Culver City, California, and tracked six songs within ten days in mid-2020 and has co-written the EP with Clint Lowery. Rose recorded all the vocals, piano and drums while Lowery performed all the guitars and Jason Christopher played the bass. Regarding the recording of the EP he stated:

So I called Clint, and he said, 'I'm gonna send you some guitar riffs, and you play drums and sing on it, and see what happens.' So I ended up doing a solo record, like it was a joke. I was just, like, 'I'll just go in and record a little bit. I'm not a singer; I'm a screamer.' So I ended up doing this solo record, and Rise picked it up. And I was, like, 'Oh my God. I have a record deal as a solo artist now all of a sudden.' It was a trip.".

== Promotion ==
On November 30, 2020, Rose released a music video for "Exhale". The video, directed by Chuck Brueckmann, follows Rose as he prepares to head out and face all the challenges the world presents him while inspiring others to follow his path.

== Track listing ==
All tracks are written by Morgan Rose and Clint Lowery, except where noted.

No.	Title	Writer(s)	Length
1.	"Intro"		0:26
2.	"The Answer"		4:13
3.	"Faster Man"		6:15
4.	"Clarity"		4:13
5.	"Come Alive"		3:52
6.	"Exhale"	Andrew Groves, Rose, Lowery	4:29
Total length:			23:28

== Personnel ==
Adapted from AllMusic.

- Morgan Rose – vocals, piano, drums, production
- Clint Lowery – guitar
- Jason Christopher – bass
- Andrew Groves – production, programming, composition
- Chris Coulter – engineering, programming
- Lizzy Ostro – engineering
