= HVY1 =

Live album by Stuck Mojo
- Released: October 12, 1999
- Recorded: Live, the Masquerade- Atlanta, Georgia
- Genre: Rap metal
- Length: 66:49
- Label: Century Media
- Producer: Andy Sneap

Stuck Mojo chronology
Rising (1998)	HVY1 (1999)	Declaration of a Headhunter (2000)

Professional ratings
Review scores
Source	Rating
AllMusic	3/5 stars

HVY1 is the only live album by rap metal group Stuck Mojo. Most of the songs are taken from the band's performance in 1998 at the Masquerade Club in Atlanta, however some of the songs are from a performance in Spain. The album included two new studio tracks, "My Will" and "Reborn", as well as an untitled bonus track.

== Track listing ==
1. 2 Minutes of Death 2:00
2. Mental Meltdown 4:44
3. Monster 3:37
4. Twisted 4:15
5. Crooked Figurehead 2:58
6. Trick 5:45
7. Rising 3:52
8. Enemy Territory 2:35
9. Back in the Saddle 5:09
10. Throw the Switch 3:41
11. Tears 3:23
12. F.O.D. 4:47
13. Not Promised Tomorrow 3:05
14. Southern Pride 4:06
15. Pipe Bomb 3:58
16. Reborn 4:28
17. My Will 3:10
  1. Change My Ways Chant (Hidden Live Bonus Track)- 4:36
