= Twelve Year Silence =

Studio album by Dark New Day
- Released: June 14, 2005
- Recorded: January–February 2005
- Studio: Gridlock Studios (Orlando, Florida)
- Genre: Nu metal, alternative metal, hard rock
- Length: 45:23
- Label: Warner Bros.
- Producer: Dark New Day; Justin Thomas

Dark New Day chronology
Twelve Year Silence (2005)	Black Porch (Acoustic Sessions) (2006)

Singles from Twelve Year Silence
- 1. "Brother" Released: June 28, 2005; 2. "Pieces" Released: 2005

Professional ratings
Review scores
Source	Rating
AllMusic	2/5 stars
Blistering	(favorable)
Melodic	4/5 stars
Ultimate Guitar	9.7/10 stars

Twelve Year Silence is the first album by American rock band Dark New Day. It was released on June 14, 2005 by Warner Bros. Records. The first single, "Brother", received moderate airplay on radio, and has proven to be a surprise hit. The song came pre-installed on the Xbox 360's Custom Mix playlist. The song "Pieces" was in the soundtrack for WWE Smackdown! vs. Raw 2006 while "Taking Me Alive" was featured during the end credits of the 2005 version of House of Wax.

== Track listing ==
No.	Title	Writer(s)	Length
1.	"Taking Me Alive"	Clint Lowery, Brett Hestla	4:42
2.	"Brother"	Clint Lowery	3:52
3.	"Free"	Clint Lowery, Brett Hestla	4:38
4.	"Pieces"	Clint Lowery, Brett Hestla	4:26
5.	"Bare Bones"	Clint Lowery, Brett Hestla	3:56
6.	"That's Enough"	Clint Lowery, Brett Hestla	3:15
7.	"Fill Me Again"	Clint Lowery	3:35
8.	"Lean"	Clint Lowery	4:02
9.	"Evergreen"	Clint Lowery, Brett Hestla	3:24
10.	"Heal in Time"	Clint Lowery, Brett Hestla	4:15
11.	"Follow the Sun Down"	Clint Lowery	4:17

== Personnel ==
Dark New Day

- Brett Hestla – lead vocals, additional guitar
- Clint Lowery – lead guitar, vocals
- Troy McLawhorn – rhythm guitar, backing vocals
- Corey Lowery – bass, backing vocals
- Will Hunt – drums, backing vocals

Production and design

- Dark New Day – producer, engineer
- Justin Thomas – producer, engineer
- Blumpy – engineer, digital editing
- Ben Grosse – mixing
- Paul Pavao – mixing assistant
- Ted Jensen – mastering
- P. R. Brown – photography, design

== Charts ==
Album

Chart (2005)	Peak position
US Billboard 200	103
US Heatseekers Albums (Billboard)	1

Singles

Year	Song	Chart	Peak position
2005	"Brother"	Hot Mainstream Rock Tracks	7
2005	"Brother"	Alternative Songs	38
2005	"Pieces"	Hot Mainstream Rock Tracks	28
