= Signs of a Vacant Soul =

Studio album by Virgos Merlot
- Released: March 2, 1999
- Genre: Alternative metal; nu metal; post-grunge
- Length: 45:38
- Label: Atlantic
- Producer: Jason Elgin

Professional ratings
Review scores
Source	Rating
Allmusic	3/5 stars

Signs of a Vacant Soul is Virgos Merlot's first and only album. It was released on March 2, 1999 by Atlantic Records. The album's only single, "Gain," had moderate radio play and reached #40 on the U.S. Mainstream Rock chart. The band later reformed, minus guitarist Marchant, as "Virgos".

The opening track, "The Cycle", has been featured in an episode of The Sopranos, "...To Save Us All from Satan's Power".

== Track listing ==
1. "The Cycle" - 3:24
2. "Come Apart" - 3:51
3. "Winning" - 3:40
4. "Gain" - 4:19
5. "Wrong" - 3:06
6. "Beautiful Lie" - 4:59
7. "More" - 2:29
8. "Knowing Burns" - 3:41
9. "Kiss My Disease" - 4:32
10. "Trouble" - 3:33
11. "Parasite" - 4:19
12. "Disregarding" - 3:45

== Credits ==
- Eric Altenburger - Photography
- J.D. Charlton - Drums, Drums (Electric), Electric Drums
- Joseph Cultice - Photography
- Chris Dickerson - Bass, Vocals (background)
- Jason Elgin - Producer, Engineer, Mixing
- Steve Hall - Mastering
- Brett Hestla - Guitar, Vocals, Lyricist, Producer
- Ted "Deacon" Ledbetter - Guitar, Effects, Guitar Effects
- Jason Marchant - Guitar
- Virgos Merlot - Producer

== Singles ==
Year	Title	Chart Positions
Year	Title	US Mainstream Rock
1999	"Gain"	#40
