= Moment of Impact (album) =

Studio album by Eye Empire
- Released: December 12, 2010 (limited edition); September 14, 2011 (physical and iTunes release)
- Recorded: May–June 2010
- Genre: Alternative metal, hard rock
- Length: 42:31
- Label: Self-released

Eye Empire chronology
Moment of Impact (2010)	Impact (2012)

Version 2 cover

Professional ratings
Review scores
Source	Rating
Sputnikmusic	3.5/5 stars

Moment of Impact is the debut studio album by American rock band Eye Empire. A 1,000-copy limited edition was released on December 12, 2010, with a full release on September 14, 2011. It features guest appearances from singer Lajon Witherspoon and drummer Morgan Rose of Sevendust. It was later released as an expanded edition double album, with the title shortened to Impact.

== Track listing ==
All tracks are written by Eye Empire, except for where noted

No.	Title	Writer(s)	Length
1.	"I Pray"		3:37
2.	"Idiot"		3:36
3.	"More Than Fate"	Clint Lowery	3:30
4.	"Bull in a China Shop"		3:14
5.	"Angels & Demons (Be My Angel)"		3:44
6.	"Feels Like I'm Falling"		3:07
7.	"Victim (of the System)" (featuring Lajon Witherspoon and Morgan Rose)		3:15
8.	"Self Destructive"		3:15
9.	"Ignite (Moment of Impact)"		3:33
10.	"The Great Deceiver"		3:30
11.	"Don't Lie to Me"		4:27
12.	"Last One Home"	Clint Lowery	3:43

V.1 and V.2
No.	Title	Writer(s)	Length
1.	"I Pray"		3:37
2.	"Idiot"		3:36
3.	"More Than Fate"	Clint Lowery	3:30
4.	"Bull in a China Shop"		3:14
5.	"Reason"		4:23
6.	"Feels Like I'm Falling"		3:07
7.	"Victim (of the System)" (feat. Lajon Witherspoon)		3:15
8.	"So Wrong"		3:45
9.	"Ignite (Moment of Impact)"		3:33
10.	"The Great Deceiver"		3:30
11.	"Last One Home"	Clint Lowery	3:43

== Personnel ==
Eye Empire

- Donald Carpenter – lead vocals
- B.C. Kochmit – guitar, backing vocals
- Corey Lowery – bass, backing vocals
- Ryan Bennett – drums on "Angels & Demons" and "Don't Lie to Me"

Additional personnel

- Morgan Rose – drums, percussion
- Lajon Witherspoon – vocals on "Victim (of the System)"
