= Morgan Rose =

American drummer

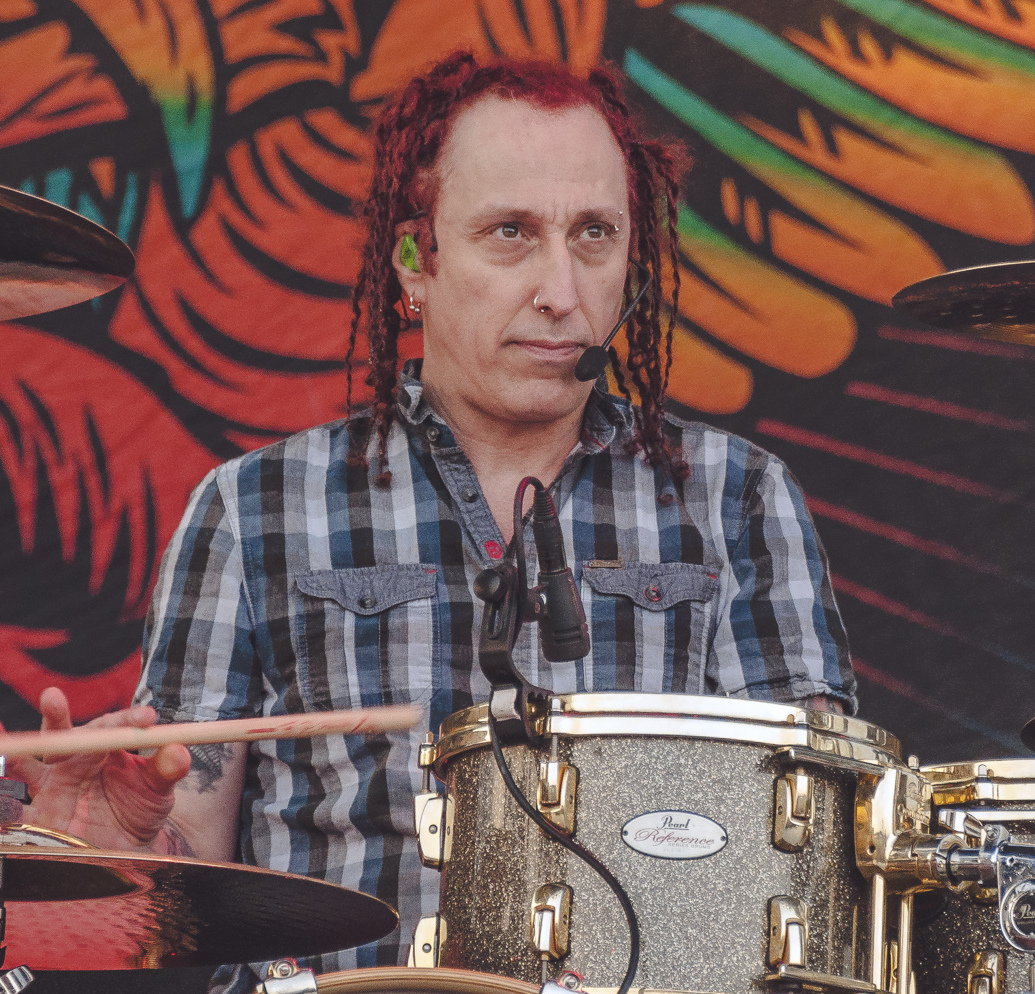
- Rose performing with Sevendust in 2016

Background information
- Born: Morgan Jay Rose; December 13, 1968 (age 57); Atlanta, Georgia, U.S.
- Genres: Alternative metal; heavy metal; nu metal
- Occupations: Musician; record producer
- Instruments: Drums, vocals, percussion
- Years active: 1988–present
- Labels: Warner Bros.; 7 Bros.
- Member of: Sevendust
- Website: alienfreakwear.com

Morgan Jay Rose (born December 13, 1968) is an American musician, best known for being a founding member of Atlanta-based alternative metal band Sevendust. In addition to being the band's drummer, he contributes a mix of backing and unclean vocals. Outside of Sevendust, Rose has also played drums for Call Me No One and Tommy Lee's Methods of Mayhem, as well as serving as a fill-in drummer for bands such as Korn and Mötley Crüe. Away from his work as a musician, Rose also serves as the Vice President of Imagen Records.

== Early life ==
Rose lived in New Jersey until the age of seven, before he and his family moved back to Atlanta, Georgia. Rose's father was a guitarist and his mother, who followed the Raspberries in the 1970s, took her young son to see David Bowie's Ziggy Stardust tour, which he witnessed while sitting on the shoulders of a security guard. He credits his father with teaching him guitar and claimed that he was able to play Jimi Hendrix's "If 6 Was 9" when he was three years old. Rose attended high school in St. Petersburg, Florida, where he played in many garage bands, after which he went to the Musicians' Institute of Los Angeles.

== Career ==
Rose began his music career in the early 1990s with the bands Fairchild and Stiff Kitty, before eventually playing in Snake Nation, alongside Vinnie Hornsby. In late 1992, Rose and Hornsby joined forces with Lajon Witherspoon, who was at that time in a funk rock band called Body & Soul, and formed Rumblefish, which was changed to Crawlspace then to Sevendust after a name rights issue. Morgan Rose is one of the most respected and most innovative drummers in the industry, being voted by Drum magazine and Drummerworld as one of the top 100 drummers of all time. He is also one of the most charismatic members of the band. He often writes lyrics, and is the backup vocalist when playing live. Australia's Rolling Stone voted him the "Hottest drummer" in history, thanks to a poll that was taken in 2003. In 2004, he was voted the number one metal drummer by Modern Drummer magazine. He is also ranked no.32 in Hit Parader's Top 100 Bassist and Drummers of All time.

Rose is featured on guest vocals in American heavy metal band Neversets track, "Take It All Away".

Alien Freak Wear is his own personal line of clothing with T-shirts, hoodies, headwear, and many other items. He also has his own signature Alien Freak model of drumsticks made by Vater Percussion, whom he is endorsed by. The brand name Alien Freak stems from a nickname Rose earned early in his career. On how the nickname came about, Rose explains in a 2007 article; "A long time ago some close friends of mine started calling me an alien, probably because of my personal/visual style. At the same time, a lot of people were calling me a freak because of how I was performing. A few years ago someone asked if I'd be interested in having my own stick and starting a merchandise company, and those things needed a name. So we put the two nicknames together".

Due to Tommy Lee injuring his hand in August 2009, Morgan filled in on drums in place of Lee, in Mötley Crüe, for five shows on Crüe Fest 2 from August 14 to 19. He was also recruited to replace Ray Luzier and pulled double duty on the last few shows of the first leg of the Music As A Weapon V tour, sitting behind the kit for co-headliners Korn.

Morgan Rose recorded drums on Eye Empire's debut album, Moment of Impact.

In June 2012, Rose began working with The Infinite Staircase (Karina Esparza) at Architekt Music, as both the drummer and producer of their ninth album, Black Out the Sun, released in March 2013.

In late 2014, Rose began working with Ghost Embrace at HyperThreat Recording Studio creating the rhythm tracks for their latest album to be released in late 2014 or early 2015. This recording studio in Denver rented a Pearl Drum Set while Johnny Morgan's tech provided the Evans heads and Zildjian cymbals for the tracks Morgan recorded.

In 2014, Rose formed a side project with Candlebox singer Kevin Martin called Le Projet.

== Solo ==
Morgan Rose released his official debut solo EP Controlled Chaos via Rise Records on November 27, 2020. Rose co-wrote the album with Sevendust bandmate Clint Lowery.

== Personal life ==
Rose was married to musician Rayna Foss, former bassist for the metal band Coal Chamber. They have since divorced. Together they have one child, a daughter born in 1999. Rose then married Teri Harrison in October 2008, and they have a son together. They have since divorced.

== Equipment ==
Rose plays Pearl Masterworks Series Drums, Remo Drum Heads,Sabian Cymbals, and Promark drumsticks, as well as ddrum electronics, specifically their tube trigger. He previously used Zildjian cymbals. He is a large supporter of the new Pearl Vision Sets. He also uses Vater Drumsticks, with two signature models, the Alien Freak (double butt end), the Whiplash, which is similar to a 2B stick and Motu DP software.

Pearl Masterworks Series Drums & Zildjian Cymbals:

- Drums — Broken Glass Finish All shells are 6-ply, 2 Inner Plies Maple/4 Outer Plies Mahogany
  - 10x10" Tom
  - 12x10" Tom
  - 14x14" Floor Tom
  - 16x16" Floor Tom
  - 22x18" Bass Drum
  - 14x5" Morgan Rose Signature Snare
  - 10x6" Snare (additional)
  - 6x8" Concert Tom
  - 8x8" Concert Tom
- Cymbals (Previous Tours, Stage L to R)
  - 9.5" Zil-Bel (Custom drilled with 8 small holes)
  - 14" Oriental China 'Trash'
  - 18" K Dark Medium Thin Crash
  - 8" K Custom Dark Splash
  - 8" A Custom Splash
  - 14" K Hi Hats
  - 18" A Custom Rezo Crash
  - 21" Z3 Mega Bell Ride
  - 20" A Custom Rezo Crash
  - 9.5" Zil-Bel (Custom drilled with 4 large holes)
  - 19" A Custom Medium Crash
  - 19" K Custom Hybrid China
  - 16" Oriental China 'Trash'
  - 9.5" Zil-Bel
  - 12" Oriental China 'Trash'
- Hardware — Pearl
  - B1000 Boom Cymbal Stand (x9)
  - C1000 Straight Cymbal Stand (x2)
  - T2000 Double Tom Stand (x2)
  - TC1000 Tom/Cymbal Stand (x4)
  - H1000 Hi-Hat Stand
  - S2000 Snare Stand
  - P2002C Double Pedal
  - CLH1000 Closed Hi-Hat
  - D2000 Throne
  - PPS37 perc. holder (x4)

== Discography ==
=== Solo ===
- Controlled Chaos EP (2020)

=== Sevendust ===
- Sevendust (1997)
- Home (1999)
- Animosity (2001)
- Seasons (2003)
- Next (2005)
- Alpha (2007)
- Chapter VII: Hope and Sorrow (2008)
- Cold Day Memory (2010)
- Black Out the Sun (2013)
- Time Travelers & Bonfires (2014)
- Kill the Flaw (2015)
- All I See Is War (2018)
- Blood & Stone (2020)
- Truth Killer (2023)
- One (2026)

=== Iron Steel ===
- Devil May Care EP (2008)

=== Call Me No One ===
- Last Parade (June 5, 2012)

=== Other appearances ===
- Letters by Butch Walker - Drums (2004)
- Let the Truth Be Known by Souls of We - Drums (2008)
- "A Song for Chi" (2009)
- Counting the Hours by Digital Summer - Backing vocals in "Playing The Saint", guest drummer on "Anybody Out There" and "Use Me." (2010)
- Moment of Impact by Eye Empire - Drums (2010)
- Moving Forward EP by Annandale - Drums (2012)
- Pitch Black by Josh Willis - Drums (2012)
- No Amends by The Infinite Staircase - Producer, Drums, Backing Vocals (October 15, 2013)
- Morgan Rose with Zakk Wylde, Kevin Martin, John DeServio and The Infinite Staircase teamed up to write and record a song in an effort to help raise money for the victims of Hurricane Sandy. The song was recorded at Architekt Music in Butler, New Jersey and was released, as an iTunes exclusive, on January 8, 2013, via Vanity Music Group.

== Production ==
- Outta Control EP by Neverset (2009)
- Demons EP by Candlelight Red (2012)
- Reclamation by Candlelight Red (2013)
