= Corey Lowery =

American musician (born 1973)

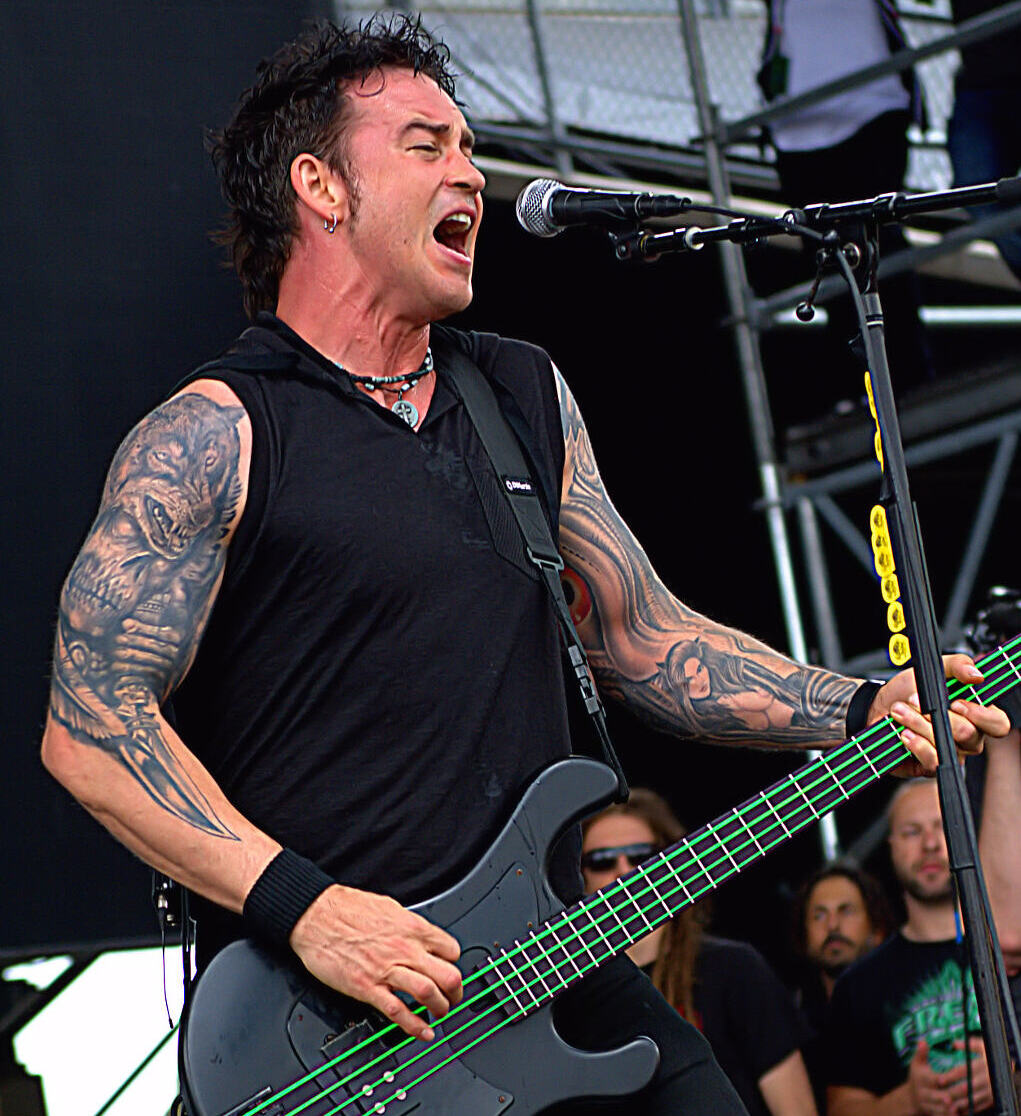
- Lowery in 2015

Background information
- Also known as: Locore
- Born: February 23, 1973 (age 53)
- Origin: Fayetteville, North Carolina, U.S.
- Genres: Heavy metal; hard rock; alternative metal; post-grunge
- Occupations: Musician; songwriter; record producer; engineer
- Instruments: Bass guitar; guitar; vocals
- Years active: 1995–present
- Member of: Seether
- Formerly of: Still Rain; Stereomud; Call Me No One; Saint Asonia; Dark New Day; Stuck Mojo; Eye Empire
- Website: coreylowery.com

Corey French Lowery (born February 23, 1973) is an American musician, songwriter, record producer and engineer. He is the guitarist and backing vocalist for South African rock band Seether, and a former member of Saint Asonia, Stuck Mojo, Stereomud, Eye Empire, and Dark New Day. He is the brother of Clint Lowery.

== History ==
Lowery played bass guitar with Stuck Mojo from 1995 to 1998, including most of two albums, Pigwalk and Rising.

He then joined Stereomud which consisted of Lowery on bass, Erik Rogers on vocals, Dan Richardson on drums, and John Fattoruso and Joey Zampella on guitars. They released their first album, Perfect Self, on Columbia Records in 2001 and a video for the song "Pain" received airplay on MTV2. They released Every Given Moment in April 2003. After participating in the Jägermeister Music Tour with Hed PE, Breaking Benjamin, Systematic, 68rouge and Saliva, Columbia Records cut their touring support, and dropped the band. Due to this, and an impending Life of Agony reunion, Stereomud went their separate ways in July 2003, three months after the release of Every Given Moment.

Lowery formed Dark New Day in 2004 featuring Brett Hestla, Troy McLawhorn, Will Hunt and later, his older brother, Clint Lowery. On June 14, 2005, the band released their first album, Twelve Year Silence through Warner Bros. Records. The first single from the effort, "Brother", was a top 10 hit on active stations. On September 5, 2006, the band released an EP, Black Porch (Acoustic Sessions), through the iTunes store. The only single that was released was the acoustic version of "Follow the Sun Down".

Eye Empire was formed in October 2009. The band included Lowery, guitarist B.C. Kochmit, former Submersed singer Donald Carpenter and Ryan Bennett on drums. During this time, Lowery also co-produced and co-wrote on the Sevendust album, Cold Day Memory. He reunited with Stuck Mojo at the end of 2014.

In 2015, Lowery was asked by Mike Mushok and Adam Gontier to join their new band, Saint Asonia. Lowery departed the band in the summer of 2018 after he was asked by Seether to fill-in on guitar and backing vocals while the band supported Nickelback on their eight-week Feed the Machine European and UK tour. The tour also included a stop in South Africa for Seether, after a six year absence. Before the tour ended, he became a full time member of the band.

== Discography ==
Still Rain

- Self Titled (1994)
- Bitter Black Water (1995)

Stuck Mojo

- Pigwalk (1996)
- Violated (EP) (1997)
- Rising (1998)

Stereomud

- Perfect Self (2001)
- Every Given Moment (2003)

Dark New Day

- Twelve Year Silence (June 14, 2005)
- Black Porch (Acoustic Sessions) (EP) (September 5, 2006)
- Hail Mary (August 23, 2011)
- B-Sides (August 24, 2011)
- New Tradition (February 28, 2012)

Eye Empire

- Moment of Impact (2010)
- Impact (2012)
- Evolve (2013)

Saint Asonia

- Saint Asonia (2015)

Seether

- Si Vis Pacem, Para Bellum (2020)
- The Surface Seems So Far (2024)

Crobot

- Motherbrain (2019)
