= Every Given Moment =

Studio album by Stereomud
- Released: March 4, 2003
- Recorded: 2002
- Genre: Nu metal; alternative metal; hard rock
- Length: 36:19
- Label: Columbia; Loud
- Producer: John Travis

Stereomud chronology
Perfect Self (2001)	Every Given Moment (2003)

Singles from Every Given Moment
- 1. "Breathing" Released: 2002

Professional ratings
Review scores
Source	Rating
AllMusic	3/5 stars

Every Given Moment is the second and final album by American nu metal band Stereomud. It was released on March 4, 2003 through Loud Records and was manufactured via Columbia Records. The album was the follow-up to their 2001 debut album, Perfect Self, but this album did not impress critics and the band broke up soon after. The song "Show Me" is featured in the video game NASCAR The Game: 2011, and the bonus track "End of Everything" (featured exclusively on the Japanese CD release) is featured in the WWF Forceable Entry album as the theme song of WWE wrestler Raven.

== Track listing ==
All tracks are written by Stereomud, except "End of Everything", which is co-written with James A. Johnston.

No.	Title	Length
1.	"Show Me"	2:53
2.	"Anything But Jesus"	2:55
3.	"Breathing"	3:47
4.	"Define This"	2:22
5.	"Control Freak"	3:02
6.	"Drop Down"	3:37
7.	"Coming Home"	3:44
8.	"Fallen"	3:11
9.	"Yesterday"	3:15
10.	"My Addiction"	4:17
11.	"Searching"	3:16
12.	"End of Everything" (Japanese edition bonus track)	3:27
Total length:		36:19

== Credits ==
Stereomud

- Erik Rogers – vocals
- Corey Lowery – bass, vocals
- Joey Zampella – guitar
- John Fattoruso – guitar
- Dan Richardson – drums

Additional musicians

- Jamie Muhoberac – keyboards
- Iki Levy – programming
- Duron Johnson – percussion

Production and design

- John Travis – producer, engineer
- Pete Martinez – assistant engineer
- Adam Fuller – assistant engineer
- Jack Joseph Puig – mixing
- Chris Steffen – assistant mixing engineer
- Ted Jensen – mastering
- Mirko Ilić – illustrations
- Lauren Denapoli – illustrations
- Clay Patrick McBride – photography
- Frank Carbonari – logo design
