= The Supervillains =

American reggae, ska/punk band

- Origin: St. Cloud, Florida, USA; Orlando, Florida
- Genres: Ska; Punk; Reggae
- Years active: 1996–Present
- Labels: Rah Rah Rah Records; LAW Records (Current)
- Members: Scott "Skart" Suldo; Dominic Maresco; B.J. Hall; Tom "T-Rex" Moulton; Joshua Senften
- Past members: Ricardo San Jose; Jon "Smally" Cestero; Dan Grundorf; Nathan Anderson
- Website: Official Site; Myspace Page; Facebook Page

The Supervillains is a five-piece reggae, ska/punk band from St. Cloud, Florida. The band has released nine studio albums.

== History ==
=== Formation and Self-Titled EP (1996–2000) ===
During the summer of 1996, Floridian high school friends Scott "Skart" Suldo on guitar/vocals and Dominic "Dom" Maresco on drums/vocals started playing together under the name 'The Supervillains'. The duo released their self-titled debut album EP in 2000.

=== Horseshoes and Handgrenades and Jahmerica (2002–2004) ===
In 2002, the band released their second self-produced studio album, Horseshoes and Handgrenades with new member Jonathan "Smally" Cestero on saxophone.

Then, they released their third album, Jahmerica in 2004 on Prairie Dawgin' Records, paying homage to their reggae roots.

With members coming and going over the years, including a horn section ("Smally" on sax and new member Ricardo "Cardo" San Jose on trumpet being the longer-mainstays), the band is self-described "Florida-bred swamp reggae rockers".

=== Grow Yer Own and Massive (2006–2008) ===
After touring with Pepper, they were signed to their label, LAW Records and released their fourth album Grow Yer Own in 2006.

After the addition of bassist Dan Grundorf, the band released their fifth album, Massive in 2008.

=== Postcards From Paradise and Robots EP (2011–2012) ===
On February 8, 2011, they released their sixth album, Postcards From Paradise on their own label, Rah Rah Rah Records. This was the first time the band worked with producer Brett Hestla who mixed and engineered the album, as well as provided backing vocals on the single "Free".

They released their first EP (and seventh album), titled Robots on May 1, 2012, featuring songs about robots in different settings (i.e. Limbo, Purgatory or Hell).

=== Volume 8 (2013) ===
The band is currently signed to LAW Records and continue to tour and perform with other groups from the label. The Supervillains were formerly signed to Rah Rah Rah Records, with whom they released their eighth studio album Volume 8 on April 9, 2013. The album featured many special guests including: Leilani Wolfgramm, Charlie Bender of The Spitvalves, Blak, Antonee First Class, and saxophonist Jeff Richie of The Toasters, as well as Brett Hestla who once again produced the album.

=== Nice Things (2017) ===
Wanting to concentrate on programming and production, Dan Grundorf permanently handed over the reins to former Abandon the Midwest bassist B.J. Hall, the band's long-time stage/guitar-tech and tour bus driver, as well as being signed to the band's own label, Rah Rah Rah Records. With Hall on board, the band released their ninth studio album Nice Things in 2017, back on LAW Records.

The Supervillains was one of many reggae and punk bands that was featured on The House That Bradley Built, a tribute to Sublime and the Bradley Nowell family's non-profit "Bradley's House", which was released on January 15, 2021. The band covered Sublime's song "What Happened", listed on disc 2 of the deluxe edition of the album.

=== Drones EP (2021) ===
On November 26, 2021, The Supervillains released their second EP, Drones, a direct follow-up to their Robots EP from 2012. It was recorded in a barn during the lock down of the COVID-19 epidemic. Drummer Dom Moresco summed up the EP in one sentence, "The Drones EP is like a 25-minute-long movie for your ears." He added, "It's meant to be listened to in its entirety, you'll laugh; you'll cry, and you'll wanna listen to it again."

Also, in a two-month anticipation of the Drones EP, the band released a stand-alone single titled, "Daisy" in ode to the Vaudeville-era song the operating system "HAL" rebooted to in Stanley Kubrick's film, 2001: A Space Odyssey.

== Tours ==
The Supervillains have been a supporting band on tour with reggae, punk, ska bands: Pepper, Slightly Stoopid, Dirty Heads, Fishbone, NOFX, Streetlight Manifesto, Mu330, Inner Circle, Authority Zero, the Expendables, the Mad Caddies, Less Than Jake, The English Beat, and Catch 22.

== Musical influences ==
In a 2016 interview about who influences them on writing original music, Dom answers, "We grew up, listening to a lot of music ranging from grunge to punk, hip-hop, and reggae. We have been influenced by The Suicide Machines, Sublime, Operation Ivy, The Skatalites, The Toasters, and The Beatles."

== Collaborations ==
They have collaborated with artists such as Jack Ruby Jr. and Jeff Richey of The Toasters, Kyle MacDonald of Slightly Stoopid, and Kris Bentley formerly of Inner Circle.

== Lineup ==
=== Current members ===
- Scott "Skart" Suldo – guitars, lead vocals (1996–present)
- Dominic "Dom" Maresco – drums, backing vocals (1996–present)
- Tom "T-Rex" Moulton – keyboards (2012–present)
- B.J. Hall – bass (2017–present)
- Joshua Senften – saxophone (2017–present)

=== Past members ===
- Jonathan "Smally" Cestero – tenor saxophone, flute (2002–2013)
- Dan Grundorf – bass, sampler, programming (2008–2017)
- Ricardo "Cardo" San Jose – trumpet (2006–2009)
- Nathan Anderson – saxophone (2011)

== Discography ==
=== Studio albums ===
Chart History
Year	Album	Label	Billboard peak
2002	Horseshoes and Handgrenades	Self-produced	—
2004	Jahmerica	Prairie Dawgin' Records	—
2006	Grow Yer Own	LAW Records	—
2008	Massive	LAW Records	—
2011	Postcards From Paradise	Rah Rah Rah Records	—
2013	Volume 8	Rah Rah Rah Records	—
2017	Nice Things	LAW Records	—

=== Extended play (EPs) ===
Chart History
Year	Album	Label	Billboard peak
2000	Self-Titled EP	Self-produced	—
2012	Robots EP	Rah Rah Rah Records	—
2021	Drones EP	Rah Rah Records	—

=== Singles ===
Title	Release date	Album
"Be Alright"	2002	Horseshoes and Handgrenades
"Crippy Weed"	2002	Horseshoes and Handgrenades
"Dom Song"	2002	Horseshoes and Handgrenades
"Purgatory"	2002	Horseshoes and Handgrenades
"You Got Me"	2002	Horseshoes and Handgrenades
"Mixed Signals"	2004	Jahmerica
"Nazi Stomp"	2004	Jahmerica
"Overdose"	2004	Jahmerica
"Smoke 'Em If You Got 'Em"	2004	Jahmerica
"20 Excuses"	2006	Grow Yer Own
"Breakfast on a Mirror"	2006	Grow Yer Own
"Ex-Girlfriend"	2006	Grow Yer Own
"Get Out Da Way"	2006	Grow Yer Own
"Little Girl"	2006	Grow Yer Own
"Mary Jane & Jagermeister" (feat. Jack Ruby Jr. of The Toasters)	2006	Grow Yer Own
"Surfin' USA"	2006	Grow Yer Own
"Resin"	2006	Grow Yer Own
"Uno Momento"	2006	Grow Yer Own
"Iru Kanji"	2008	Massive
"Movin' Out"	2008	Massive
"Smoke 'Em" (feat. Kris Bentley of Inner Circle)	2008	Massive
"Snow White"	2008	Massive
"St. Thomas"	2008	Massive
"The Pit" (feat. Kyle MacDonald of Slightly Stoopid)	2008	Massive
"Tortuosity"	2008	Massive
"Careless Whisperer" (George Michael cover)	2011	Postcards From Paradise
"Drinkin' Tonight"	2011	Postcards From Paradise
"Fundamentalists"	2011	Postcards From Paradise
"I Hate Everything"	2011	Postcards From Paradise
"I'm Leaving"	2011	Postcards From Paradise
"The Bottom of the World"	2011	Postcards From Paradise
"The Way That I Like It"	2011	Postcards From Paradise
"Rapture"	May 1, 2012	Robots EP (Single)
"Limbo"	2012	Robots EP
"Stuck"	January 8, 2013	Volume 8 (Single)
"Free" (feat. Brett Hestla)	2013	Volume 8
"It Must Be True Love"	2013	Volume 8
"Space" (feat. Charlie Bender of The Spitvalves)	2013	Volume 8
"Where Is My Mind"	2013	Volume 8
"The Place" (feat. Leilani Wolfgramm)	November 20, 2015	(Single)
"Political Porn"	2017	Nice Things
"I Will Destroy You"	2017	Nice Things
"The Sweat"	2017	Nice Things
"What Happened" (Sublime cover)	January 15, 2021	The House That Bradley Built (Single)
"Daisy"	September 2021	(Single)
"Day Z"	November 26, 2021	Drones EP (Single)
