= Brett Hestla =

American musician and record producer

- Born: February 4, 1973 (age 53); Cullman, Alabama, U.S.
- Genres: Hard rock, post-grunge, alternative metal
- Occupations: Musician, record producer
- Instruments: Vocals, guitar
- Years active: 1998–present
- Member of: Dark New Day
- Formerly of: Virgos Merlot

Brett Adam Hestla (born February 4, 1973) is an American singer, guitarist and record producer, best known as the frontman of the rock band Dark New Day.

== Career ==
In the late 1990s, Hestla's band Virgos Merlot was signed to Atlantic Records. After their first release, Signs of a Vacant Soul (1999), he became the touring bassist for Creed after the departure of Brian Marshall. When Creed disbanded in 2004, Hestla began a career as a record producer, forming the independent label Silent Majority in Orlando, Florida and working with bands such as The Supervillains, Framing Hanley, Transmit Now, Faktion, Tantric, Redfine, Lost in Silence, Refuse the Fall, Bad Axis, Iodine Sky, Calefactor, and Seven Day Sonnet.

In 2005, Hestla became the lead vocalist of Dark New Day. They released their first full length, Twelve Year Silence, later that year. The band's single "Brother" reached number 7 on the U.S. Mainstream Rock charts.

After touring, Clint Lowery returned to Sevendust and Mclawhorn and Hunt joined Evanescence, causing Dark New Day to disband. Hestla began producing for new and up-and-coming bands.

In 2014, Hestla formed a band called A Dark Line. The band released their debut EP, Running from the Light, in 2015, available for download only.
