= Southern Born Killers =

Studio album by Stuck Mojo
- Released: April 23, 2007; March 4, 2008 (International release)
- Recorded: Backstage Studios- Ripley, Derbyshire, UK
- Genre: Nu metal; rap metal; groove metal
- Length: 46:50; 59:16 (national release)
- Label: Psalms of the Ward; Napalm (International release)
- Producer: Andy Sneap, Rich Ward

Stuck Mojo chronology
Violate This (2001)	Southern Born Killers (2007)	The Great Revival (2008)

Southern Born Killers
- International release version (2008)

Professional ratings
Review scores
Source	Rating
About.com	2/5 stars
antiMusic	4/5 stars
Blistering	(positive)
Jukebox:Metal	5/5 stars
Metal Invader	3/5 stars
Metal Reviews	5.5/6 stars
Metro Spirit	(positive)
PyroMusic	7/10 stars
Sea of Tranquility	3/5 stars
Vampire Magazine	(positive)

Southern Born Killers is an album by Stuck Mojo. The initial version of the album was released as both a CD and as a free download from the band's website on April 23, 2007. The album was released internationally on March 4, 2008. This is the first album with new vocalist Lord Nelson, who had replaced the departed Bonz.

== Track listing ==
1. "I'm American" (Nelson/Ward) — 3:00
2. "Southern Born Killers" (Nelson/Ward) — 4:10
3. "The Sky Is Falling" (Nelson/Aborn/Ward/Frampton) — 5:53
4. "Metal Is Dead" (Ward/Nelson/Aborn) — 4:14
5. "For the Cause of Allah" 4:35 (Ward) —
6. "Open Season" (Ward/Nelson/Aborn/Frampton) — 7:19
7. "Prelude to Anger" (Ward) — 1:04
8. "That's When I Burn" (Nelson/Ward) — 4:02
9. "Yoko" (Ward/Nelson) — 7:47
10. "Home" (Nelson/Ward/Archie) — 4:41

Bonus tracks on international release

11. "Go" (Nelson/Ward) — 3:35
12. "The Fear Is All Around Me" (Nelson/Ward) — 5:32
13. "This Is How We Swing" (Nelson/Ward) — 3:23
