= Transmit Now =

American alternative/pop rock band

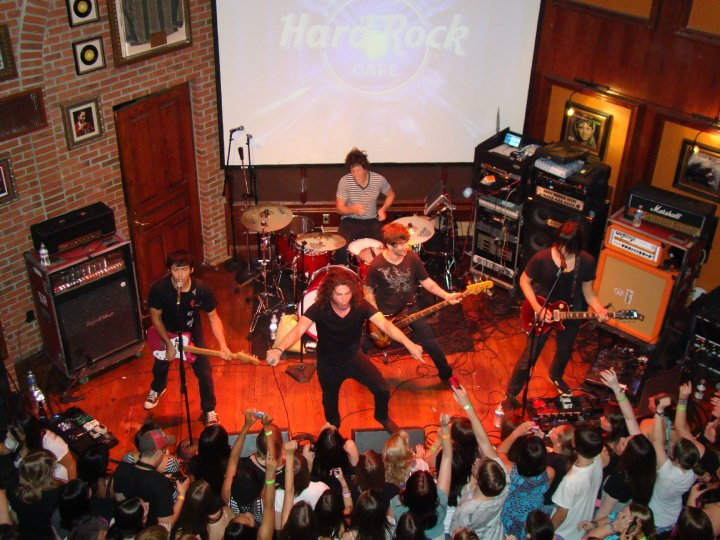
- Transmit Now at Hard Rock Live Memphis, Tennessee June 10, 2010

Background information
- Origin: Orlando, Florida, Florida, United States
- Genres: Pop rock, alternative rock
- Years active: 2008–2013
- Labels: Silent Majority, Warner
- Members: Andy Brooks; Kevin Parrow; Tony Aguirre; Greg Parrow; Lee Gianou

Transmit Now was an alternative/pop rock band based out of Orlando, Florida. The band's first live performance was on July 10, 2008 at the Van's Warped Tour 2008, the result of winning an online "Battle of the Bands" event. Soon after, Transmit Now went on to win the popular vote in MTV's "I Want My Music On MTV II" contest, and has since had its music featured in several MTV shows. In 2010, the band put out a full-length album "Downtown Merry Go Round." In May 2010 the band shot a video for the album's first single, "Let's Go Out Tonight" directed by Chris Grieder. The video won mtvU's Freshman 5 for the week of August 30, 2010 and was added to rotation on the network. A punk-rock work ethic and a love for their music is what Brooks says sets Transmit Now apart from the rest of the power pop crowd.

After parting ways with their label in early 2011 the band set out to fund the recording of their second album via the website Kickstarter raising over $11,000.

Their second album "1955" was released on May 25, 2012.

== Band members ==
The band's members are

- Andy Brooks - Vocals
- Kevin Parrow - Guitar
- Tony Aguirre - Guitar
- Greg Parrow - Drums

Former members

- Lee Gianou - Bass

In February 2009, Transmit Now was signed under the record label Silent Majority Group.

== Discography ==
"Self Titled" EP (2008)

"Test, Test" EP (2009)

"Downtown Merry Go Round" (2010)

"1955" (2012)

“1955 Redux” (2022)

== Major appearances and accomplishments ==
Transmit Now's debut video for "Let's Go Out Tonight" won mtvU's Freshman 5 for the week of August 30, 2010 The video can be seen here

Their debut album "Downtown Merry Go Round" is set for release on iTunes April 20, 2010 and in stores May 25, 2010.

On January 6, 2010 "Let's Go Out Tonight" was featured on The Peoples Choice Awards on CBS. The song can be heard as Hugh Jackman accepted his award for "Best Action Hero"

On December 31, 2009, Transmit Now was named TOP NEWCOMER BAND in the 2009 Rock on Request Magazine Top In Rock Awards.

On December 18, 2009 Transmit Now made their television debut on the nationally syndicated show "The Daily Buzz"

On December 5, 2009, Transmit Now played the 3rd stage at 103.1 FM The Buzz's Buzz Bake Sale 2009.

On August 4, 2009, Transmit Now released their ep, "Test, Test"

On May 5, 2009, Transmit Now completed recording for their ep, "Test, Test"

On February 17, 2009, Transmit Now was signed with Silent Majority Group.

On September 7, 2008, Tarantism was featured on the 2008 MTV Video Music Awards.

On October 7, 2008, that same song was featured on MTV's Making the Band 4.

On October 20, 2008, Transmit Now was named the winner of MTV's "I Want My Music On MTV" contest, resulting in the filming of their song "Tarantism."

The video for "Tarantism" was first aired on MTV on November 11, 2008. The song was also featured that day on MTV's Paris Hilton's My New BFF

In the past they have played alongside such widely known acts as Anberlin, TRUSTcompany, Mayday Parade, and Framing Hanley.

Their first full-length album was recorded in front of a live webcam feed on ustream.tv, taking time to chat with viewers.
