= DoubleDrive =

American rock band

doubleDrive
- Also known as: MK Ultra
- Origin: Atlanta, Georgia, U.S.
- Genres: Post-grunge
- Years active: 1996–2003; 2018
- Labels: MCA; Roadrunner
- Past members: Donnie Hamby; Mike Froedge; Troy McLawhorn; Josh Sattler

doubleDrive (abbreviated dD) was an American post-grunge band from Atlanta, Georgia.

== Biography ==
Originally called MK Ultra, doubleDrive arrived on the music scene in their hometown of Atlanta in late 1996. After winning the award for Atlanta's "favorite metal/extreme" band in 1998, doubleDrive signed a record deal with MCA Records and subsequently released their first studio album, 1000 Yard Stare, in the U.S. in August 1999. In 2001, doubleDrive began recording a second album with producer John Kurzweg. However, the band parted with MCA Records and the completed album remained unreleased. After shopping the album, the band signed with Roadrunner Records and re-entered the studio in 2002 with producer Michael Barbiero to remix the album and record new songs. Blue in the Face was released in the U.S., Australia and Japan in April 2003. The album peaked at No. 43 on Top Heatseekers, and the single taken from the album entitled "Imprint", reached No. 22 at Hot Mainstream Rock Tracks on Billboard charts. DoubleDrive toured with bands such as Sevendust, Kid Rock and Stereomud.

The band made the decision to dissolve in late 2003. Singer Donnie Hamby went on to do DVD work, assisting with Sevendust's Southside Doublewide Acoustic Live and Next DVDs, as well as working with numerous other Roadrunner artists. Drummer Mike Froedge owns his own studio in Atlanta called Open Sky Studio, producing, engineering and playing with various recording artists. He also performs with Open Sky Separators and Dixie Inc., and formed a new band called Speed X with doubleDrive bassist Josh Sattler, guitarist Mike Stone of Queensrÿche and guitarist Nick Catanese of Black Label Society.

The band announced a one-time reunion show on September 30, 2018, at the 10 High Club in Atlanta, which sold out. A second show was added on October 7, which also sold out.

== Members ==
- Donnie Hamby – vocals
- Mike Froedge – drums
- Troy McLawhorn – guitar
- Adam Sherman – guitar
- Josh Sattler – bass

== Discography ==
Studio albums

- 1000 Yard Stare (1999)
- Blue in the Face (2003)

Singles

Year	Title	US Mainstream Rock	Album
1999	"Tattooed Bruise (Here and There)"	#32	1000 Yard Stare
2003	"Imprint"	#22	Blue in the Face
