= Indaba Music =

Internet music collaboration platform

- Type: Privately Held
- Industry: Music and Technology
- Founded: February 2007
- Founder: Dan Zaccagnino, Mantis Evar, Matt Siegel, Jesse Chan-Norris, Chris Danzig
- Headquarters: New York City
- Area served: World
- Number of employees: 12
- Website: Official website

Indaba Music is a web-based company that provides a music collaboration environment for musicians: "a place to build a profile, promote their tunes and collaborate with other musicians" as well as enter opportunities like remixing and songwriting contests with popular artists.

== Overview ==
The company's website is both a social network and suite of collaboration technologies for musicians. The site makes it possible for musicians in different places to find each other and make music online. Indaba also launches remix contests with prominent artists including Weezer, Peter Gabriel, Snoop Dogg, and Linkin Park.

During the summer of 2010, Indaba launched the second version of their session console, named Mantis, which allows musicians to collaboratively record, edit, and mix tracks online. The relaunch coincided with a new library of Creative Commons-licensed audio loops and sounds that Indaba solicited from its community.

Membership on Indaba Music is free.

== History ==
Indaba was founded in 2005. Indaba's primary website, www.indabamusic.com, was launched in February 2007. Indaba is a Zulu word for community and collaboration and was chosen because the platform is designed as a way to meet new people and share ideas to create music. The founders came up with the idea for Indaba after starting a non-profit label while they were in college as a means to provide new opportunities for student artists and give them greater exposure. The key to Indaba Music's popularity and success is said to be based on two ideas: that the internet has helped connect artists in a more intimate way, and that the spread of cheaper, higher-quality digital music production software and hardware has enabled virtually anyone to create quality music productions. In February 2015, Indaba Music launched the Converse Rubber Tracks Sample Library in partnership with Converse. The library offers over 42,000 royalty free audio samples recorded at Converse Rubber Tracks studios. Indaba built the technology and produced the recording sessions and sample packs for the library. Many established artists have used sample in their songs including Mura Masa, who used vocals by emerging artist Lewis Lane for the hook of his mega hit song Lovesick. Other artists who have used Rubber Tracks Sample Library samples in songs include: Frank Dukes, RJD2, Com Truise, Machinedrum, Midland, Tom Trago, and Body Language.

In February 2018 Indaba was acquired by Splice.

== Networking and collaboration ==
=== Profiles and search ===
Indaba users have profiles that describe their background, tastes, and interests (meet people, collaborate online, get hired, gig/jam offline, etc.). Featured sessions and a search function allow users to find each other. Messaging and comment boards are available for communication.

=== Sessions ===
Any musician can start a session and invite members of the Indaba community to join. A session provides musicians with a space and platform to collaborate with others. Members of a session can upload and download tracks, as well as do basic editing and mixing with the Indaba online console. Communication is possible through messages, a discussion board dialogue, a live chat feature and a conference call hosted by Indaba. Sessions can be public (open to anyone in the community) or private (only open to those invited).

The session owner can search for other users to join the session by using metadata such as influences, crafts, instruments and the types of collaborations they are interested in participating in (paid only, etc.). Similarly, members can search for sessions to join by entering information about the types of sessions they are interested in participating in.

=== In-Song commenting ===
When a user selects a track on Indaba, a music player pops up on the bottom of the screen. The music player displays a waveform and members have the ability to comment along the waveform to refer to specific moments in time. Members use this feature both to give feedback to other musicians as well as to make comments on their own tracks such as "still working on these harmonies" or to mark key and time changes.

=== Recommendations ===
Using a technology from EchoNest (an audio company out of MIT Media Labs), Indaba recommends its musicians to one another based on their listed skill levels, influences, instruments, location, and previously recorded content.

=== Creative Commons License ===
When Indaba members upload tracks to an Indaba session, they can choose to reserve all rights, OR they can select a Creative Commons License for the track. The Creative Commons license they choose determines how other musicians on the site are allowed to creatively use their music. This may, for example, mean that artists are allowed to creatively use another work as long as it is not used commercially or that a musician may use another work but only in its original form.

Remix contests and sessions for artists like Rivers Cuomo (Weezer), The Crystal Method, and Carmen and Camille are creating new material that is often licensed under Creative Commons.

== Assorted press ==
=== Artist collaborations ===
Indaba Music has been noted in the press for collaborations with popular artists including John Legend, Rivers Cuomo, Mariah Carey, and Yo-Yo Ma. During these collaborations, users can access the stems from songs of these artists without paying for licensing. Time Magazine's website featured a video with cellist Yo-Yo Ma in which he discusses many of his duets including his duet contest hosted by Indaba Music. Rivers Cuomo of Weezer was quoted in an article in July 2009, stating: "It's [Indaba Music] like a simplified version of any of these complex professional recording programs that no one like me knows how to use," said Weezer frontman Rivers Cuomo, who agreed to endorse the program although he says he normally refuses such requests. "It's going to open the door for a giant population of musicians out there."

=== Assorted press and music/tech coverage ===
- Wired Magazine
- Ars Technica
- Los Angeles Times
- Business Week
- Washington Post
- MTV
- Rolling Stone Magazine Online

=== Interviews ===
- Billboard Magazine
- Colbert Report
- NPR
- ABC News

== See also ==
- Internet band
- Crowdsourcing
- Collaboration
- Social commerce
- Web 2.0
