= Stuck Mojo =

American metal band

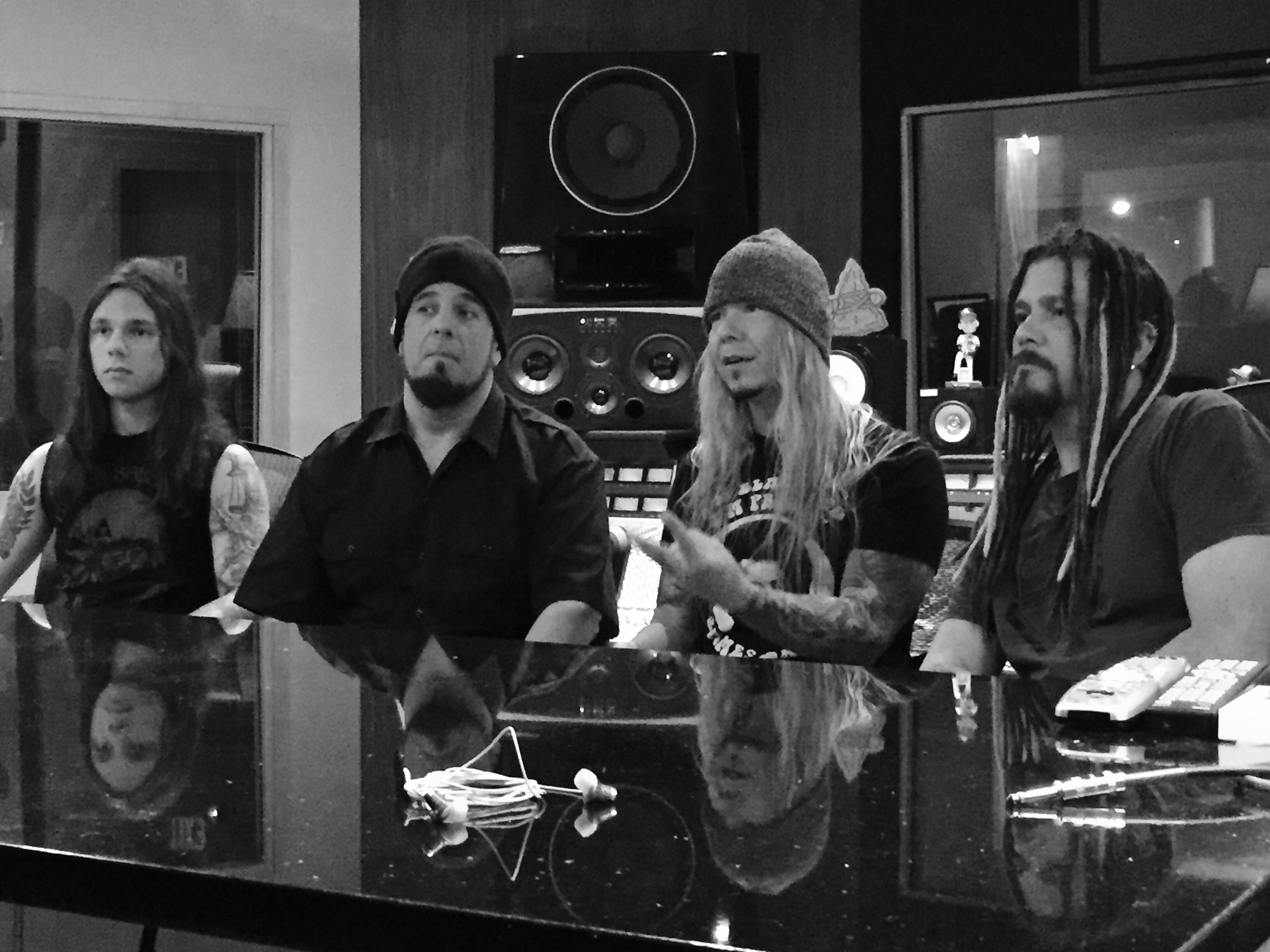
- Stuck Mojo in 2016

Background information
- Origin: Atlanta, Georgia, U.S.
- Genres: Rap metal; nu metal; groove metal
- Years active: 1989–2000, 2005–present
- Labels: Stuck Mojo Music, Century Media, Napalm
- Members: Rich Ward; Frank Fontsere; Robby J. Fonts; Len Sonnier
- Past members: Eric Sanders; Lord Nelson; Sean Delson; Mike Martin; John Carpenter; Bonz; Corey Lowery; Ryan Mallam; Brad Hasty; Brent Payne; Dwayne Fowler

Stuck Mojo is an American rap metal band from Atlanta, formed in 1989 by bassist Dwayne Fowler. The band is considered to be one of the pioneers of rap metal. They have toured alongside bands such as Machine Head and Slapshot. Stuck Mojo's most successful album, Rising, peaked at No. 48 on the Billboard Top Heatseekers chart. The band disbanded in 2000, reforming five years later. In 2006, their original vocalist, Bonz, was replaced by rapper Lord Nelson. Stuck Mojo released their seventh studio album, Here Come the Infidels, via Pledge Music in 2016. In the press release, the band also announced the addition of two new members, Robby J. Fonts (vocals) and Len Sonnier (bassist). To date, they have released seven studio albums and one live album.

== History ==
In their early days, Stuck Mojo was criticized for their hip-hop influences, while some audiences directed bigotry towards Bonz, their African American lead vocalist/rapper. In 1994, Stuck Mojo signed a deal with Century Media Records, releasing their debut album, Snappin' Necks in 1995. AllMusic's Bret Love wrote that "The group's high testosterone and volume levels, and virtual lack of funkiness, ensure a somewhat limited appeal, but for angry young men with too much pent-up energy, the powerful aggression of Snappin' Necks must be close to heaven." In October 1995, the band joined Machine Head and Slapshot on a ten-week tour while living in a rented van. Stuck Mojo's first European tour followed, and they were named the best live band by MTV Europe.

Their second studio album, Pigwalk, was released on October 8, 1996. Stephen Thomas Erlewine wrote that Pigwalk "captures the pummelling power of the band's intense live shows, yet the group doesn't yet have the ability to construct a memorable riff or hook, leaving Pigwalk as an entertaining, but uncompelling, cross of Rage Against the Machine and Pantera." On March 3, 1998, Stuck Mojo released their third studio album, Rising. It peaked at No. 48 on the Billboard Top Heatseekers chart. AllMusic reviewer Steve Huey wrote that "Rising shows some musical growth from Pigwalk, although Stuck Mojo still lose their musical focus on several occasions over the course of the album."

Stuck Mojo disbanded following the release of a live album, HVY1, and their fourth studio album, Declaration of a Headhunter, reforming in 2005. During the band's period of inactivity, Ward worked on side projects such as Fozzy and Sick Speed. In 2006, Stuck Mojo began recording material for a new album with original vocalist Bonz. Rapper Lord Nelson was asked to contribute guest vocals to the album. When it was decided that Bonz would not continue as the band's vocalist, Lord Nelson stepped into Bonz' position. The band's fifth studio album, Southern Born Killers, was released directly through the band's website without a label. The album was released as a free download, while the CD edition contained a bonus DVD. After signing with Napalm Records, Southern Born Killers was released nationally, with three bonus tracks. On November 28, 2008, Stuck Mojo released their sixth studio album, The Great Revival. It featured what has been described as some of the band's heaviest work, as well as some of the band's most "commercially-tinged songs".

=== Reunion (2014) ===
In October 2014, it was announced that the band would be playing a reunion show December 26, 2014, at The Masquerade in Atlanta, the venue they recorded their HVY1 live album. This was to be the first time Ward, Bonz, Lowery and Fontsere shared the stage together since 1998. The band scheduled two other live reunion shows (Charlotte, North Carolina and Woodstock, Virginia) in early 2015. Although the reunion shows were filled with energy and fans relished the reunited lineup, it was reported on Blabbermouth.net that the old lineup was not working out and that Ward and Fontsere would continue on and replace Bonz and Lowery at a later time.

=== Here Come the Infidels and lineup (2016) ===
In March 2016, Stuck Mojo announced they would be releasing their seventh studio album, Here Come the Infidels, via Pledge Music. In addition to the new album, Stuck Mojo announced the addition of two new members—vocalist Robby J. Fonts and Bassist Len Sonnier. Fonts is a Canadian-born musician while Sonnier hails from Vinton, Louisiana.

During the summer of 2016, Stuck Mojo released a series of lyric videos leading up to the release of Here Come the Infidels.

== Musical style ==
Stuck Mojo fuses Southern-based heavy metal with hip-hop influences, and is considered to be one of the pioneers of rap metal. Mark Jenkins of The Washington Post noted that one of the band's songs may indicate conservative views, while other songs may indicate more uniformly distributed hostility. Jenkins writes that "the [song] "Crooked Figurehead" does begin with an anti-Clinton rant, which suggests that this Atlanta quartet is the mirror image of leftist agit-metal band Rage Against the Machine. Maybe it's not just the president the Mojos hate, though—maybe it's everyone." The band cites Red Hot Chili Peppers, Run-DMC, Faith No More, Pantera and Black Sabbath as influences.

== Band members ==
=== Current ===
- Rich Ward – guitar, vocals, lyrics (1989–present)
- Frank Fontsere – drums (1996–2004, 2009–present)
- Robby J. Fonts – vocals, lyrics (2015–present)

=== Former ===
- Andrew Freund – vocals (1989)
- Richard Farmer – drums (1989–1990)
- Brad Hasty - drums (1991-1992)
- Dwayne Fowler – bass (1989–1995)
- Theron "Bonz" Archie – vocals, lyrics (1989–2006, 2014–2015)
- Benjamin Reed – drums (1990–1993)
- Brent Payne – drums (1993–1995)
- Corey Lowery – bass, vocals (1996–1998, 2014–2015)
- Karman Gossett – drums (1996)
- Dan Dryden – bass (1998–2001)
- Ryan Mallam – guitar (2000–2001)
- Keith Watson – bass (2002–2004)
- John Carpenter – drums (2002–2003)
- Sean Delson – bass (2004–2009)
- Eric Sanders – drums (2005–2006)
- Mike Martin – guitar (2005–2009)
- Lord Nelson – vocals (2006–2009)
- Rodney Beaubouef – drums (2006–2008)
- Steve "Nailz" Underwood – drums (2008–2009)
- Len Sonnier – bass (2016)
- Randy Drake – bass (2017)

== Discography ==
- Snappin' Necks (1995)
- Violated EP (1996)
- Pigwalk (1996)
- Rising (1998)
- HVY1 (Live, 1999)
- Declaration of a Headhunter (2000)
- Violate This: 10 Years of Rarities 1991–2001 (2001)
- Southern Born Killers (2007)
- The Great Revival (2008)
- Here Come the Infidels (2016)
