= Troy McLawhorn =

American guitarist (born 1968)

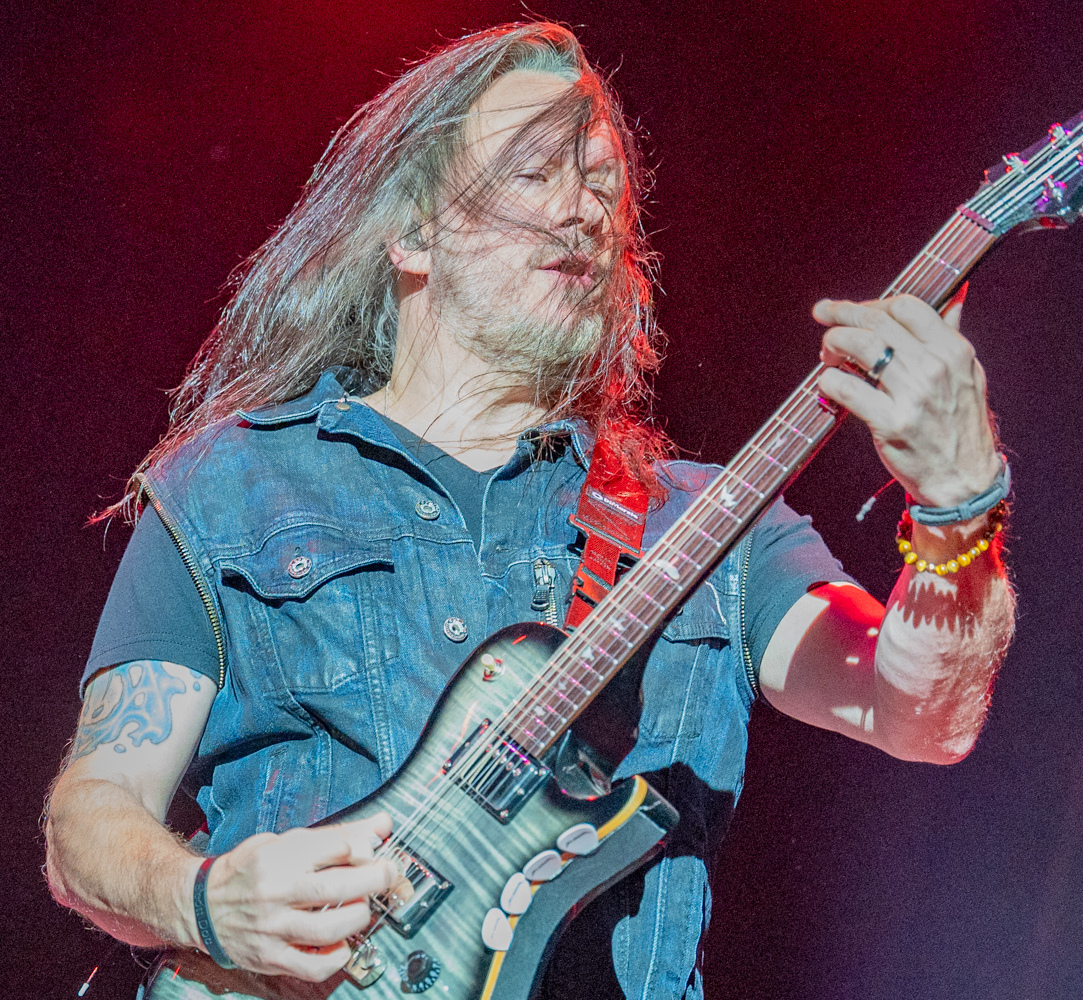
- McLawhorn performing with Evanescence in 2023

Background information
- Born: William Troy McLawhorn; November 4, 1968 (age 57)
- Origin: Fayetteville, North Carolina, U.S.
- Genres: Alternative metal; hard rock; nu metal; post-grunge
- Occupation: Musician
- Instrument: Guitar
- Years active: 1987–present
- Member of: Evanescence
- Formerly of: Seether; Dark New Day; doubleDrive
- Website: troymclawhorn.com

William Troy McLawhorn (born November 4, 1968) is an American musician who has been a guitarist in the rock band Evanescence since 2007. He has also worked with the bands Seether, Dark New Day, doubleDrive, Still Rain, and Gibraltar.

== Early career ==
McLawhorn was formerly of the bands Seether, doubleDrive and Still Rain. After the demise of his first band, Still Rain, McLawhorn helped form doubleDrive in 1996 and landed a recording contract with MCA records in 1998. They scored a top 20 hit with the song "Tattooed Bruise" from their debut album 1000 Yard Stare. The band left MCA and signed a new deal with Roadrunner Records in 2001 and released their second album, Blue in the Face, with the song "Imprint" reaching into the top 20 also. McLawhorn was an active member until December 2003, when the band broke up. Following this, he joined Corey Lowery and Will Hunt and they began working on new material, which would later become the band Dark New Day, which also included Clint Lowery and Brett Hestla. Dark New Day signed a recording contract with Warner Bros. Records in late 2004 and released the album Twelve Year Silence. The single "Brother" became a top 10 hit.

== Evanescence, Seether ==
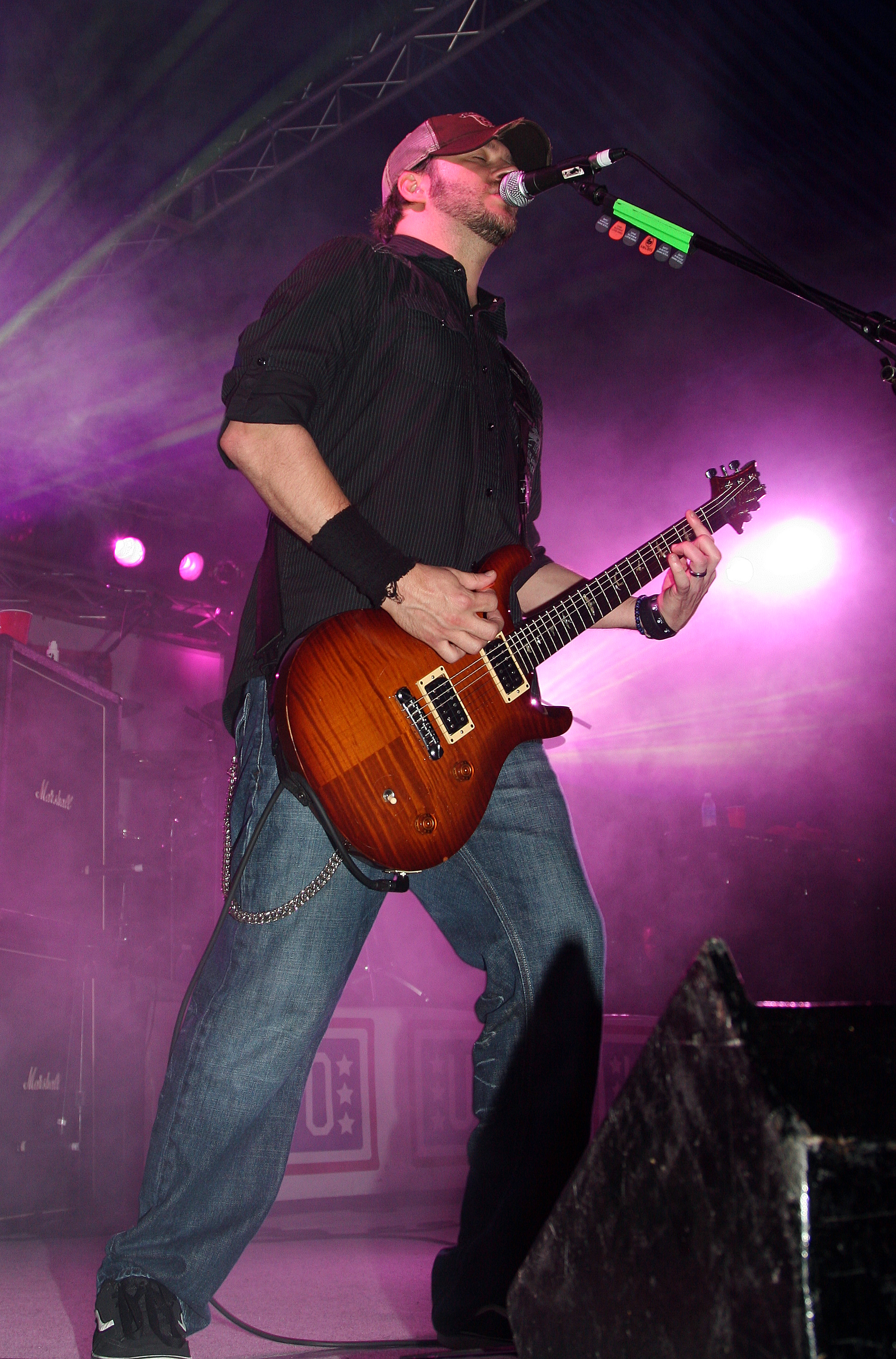
McLawhorn performing in 2009

In May 2007, McLawhorn was announced as the replacement for Evanescence's former guitarist John LeCompt and played with the band through their Open Door tour, which ended in December 2007. He remained active with Dark New Day while playing with Evanescence. However, McLawhorn eventually left Dark New Day in mid-2008 after joining Seether as a touring guitarist. After the success of Seether's subsequent tour, McLawhorn became their official lead guitarist.

From then until early March 2011, McLawhorn did various tours with Seether. He took part in recording with the band on projects such as Seether iTunes Originals, Rhapsody Originals, and on covers of Wham!'s "Careless Whisper" and Frank Sinatra's "I've Got You Under My Skin" as well. He also contributed to the album Holding Onto Strings Better Left to Fray. The first single from the record, "Country Song", co-written by McLawhorn, was released in the United States on March 8, 2011.

The same day, it was announced that McLawhorn had left Seether to pursue other interests.

In April 2011, Seether frontman Shaun Morgan took to his Twitter account to vent his frustrations regarding Troy's still unconfirmed new gig. On June 12, 2011, Amy Lee of Evanescence announced on her Twitter account that McLawhorn had officially rejoined the band for their upcoming tour and new album due out on October 11, 2011.

McLawhorn filled in for Sevendust guitarist Clint Lowery on their 2013 tour with Coal Chamber.

== Discography ==
=== Still Rain ===
- Still Rain (1994)
- Bitter Black Water (1995)

=== Sevendust ===
- Home (1999)

=== doubleDrive ===
- 1000 Yard Stare (1999)
- Blue in the Face (2003)

=== Dark New Day ===
- Twelve Year Silence (2005)
- Black Porch (Acoustic Sessions) (2006)
- Hail Mary (2011)
- B-Sides (2011)
- New Tradition (2012)

=== Seether ===
- iTunes Originals – Seether (2008)
- Rhapsody Originals – Seether (2008)
- Finding Beauty in Negative Spaces (2009 reissue of the song "Careless Whisper")
- Holding Onto Strings Better Left to Fray (2011)

=== Evanescence ===
- Evanescence (2011)
- Synthesis (2017)
- The Bitter Truth (2021)

== Equipment ==
=== Guitars ===
- Gibson USA Flying V 7-String
- Gibson Flying-V 1959
- Gibson Les Paul Studio Silverburst
- Gibson Les Paul Custom 1985
- Gibson Les Paul Custom 1990
- Gibson Explorer
- Gibson SG
- PRS Custom-Built (Cherry with 7 String)
- PRS SE Custom 24 7 Strings
- PRS SE Clint Lowery
- PRS SE Baritone Custom
- PRS SE Custom 22
- PRS SE Custom 24
- PRS Singlecut
- PRS Starla Ltd
- Boulder Creek Acoustic Guitars

=== Effects ===
- Dunlop Jimi Hendrix Signature Wah JH1D
- Dunlop Zakk Wylde W MXR Overdrive
- Dunlop MXR KFK1 Ten Band EQ
- Dunlop MC401 Boost/Line Driver
- DigiTech Whammy 4
- TC Electronic Stereo Chorus Flanger
- BOSS DD-6: Digital Delay
- BOSS CE-5: Chorus Ensemble
- BOSS NS-2: Noise Suppressor
- BOSS TU-2: Chromatic Tuner

=== Amplifiers ===
- Orange PPC412 Closed Back Guitar Cab 4- 4×12 cabs
- Orange Rockerverb 100 MKII Head

=== Other ===
- Orange Amps Amplifiers FTSWCH Foot Switch
- Dunlop Tortex Pitch Black 488
- Dunlop Nickel Plated Steel Guitar Strings
