= List of Fozzy band members =

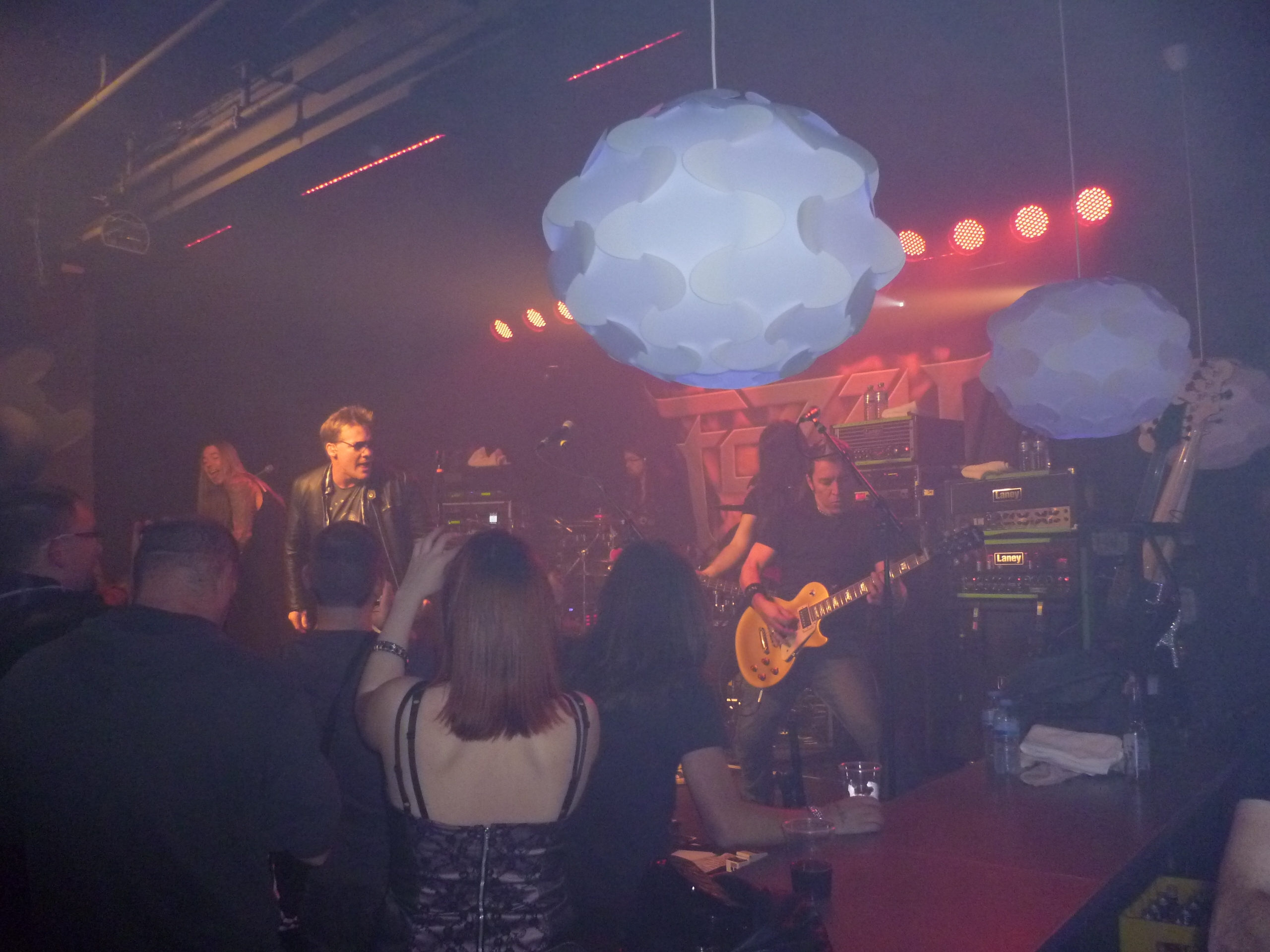
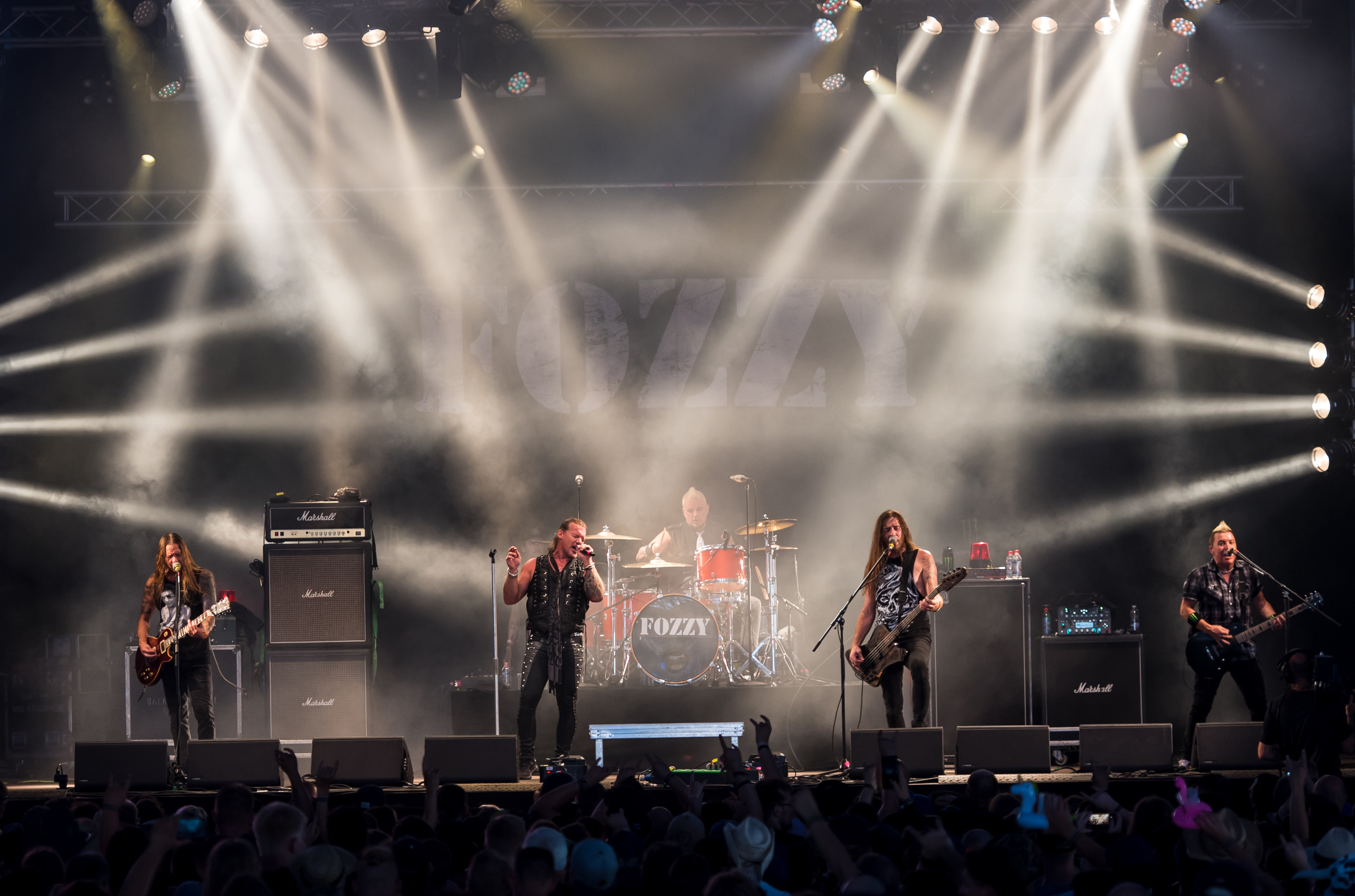
Two lineups of Fozzy performing live in 2011 (top) and 2018 (bottom).

Fozzy is an American heavy metal band from San Antonio, Texas. Formed in 1999, the group was originally a cover band known as Fozzy Osbourne, which was soon shortened to simply Fozzy. The band's original lineup included lead vocalist Chris Jericho (under the alias Moongoose McQueen) and four members of rap metal group Stuck Mojo: guitarists Rich Ward (under the alias Duke LaRüe) and Ryan Mallam (under the alias The Kidd), bassist Dan Dryden (under the alias Shawn "Sports" Popp), and drummer Frank Fontsere (under the alias KK LaFlame). The band released its self-titled debut album in 2000, which featured covers of various heavy metal songs. In November 2001, Dryden left Fozzy and Stuck Mojo, with Keith Watson (under the alias Claude "Watty" Watson) taking his place.

The group followed up Fozzy with Happenstance in 2002, which included five original songs alongside six covers. During the album's promotional tour, Billy Grey replaced Hallam at several shows, as the regular guitarist pursued a career as a lawyer. By late 2003, Watson had been replaced by Sean Delson and the band had dropped its alter egos and fake backstory. Fozzy's next album, All That Remains, was the last to feature Mallam, who left the band permanently in August 2004. He was replaced later in the year by Mike Martin. The following September, Fontsere also left Fozzy and Stuck Mojo, with Eric Sanders taking his place immediately. By the time the band's fourth studio album Chasing the Grail was announced in March 2009, however, the lineup included Fontsere again.

In February 2010, it was reported that Martin had left Fozzy, which he claimed happened in August 2009 due to "a personal falling out between me and one of the band members over business matters". The guitarist was replaced by the returning Billy Grey, now an official member of the band. Delson left after the subsequent promotional touring cycle due to musical differences, with Paul Di Leo taking his place in September 2011. Di Leo performed on 2012's Sin and Bones and 2014's Do You Wanna Start a War, but was replaced in September 2014 by Loaded bassist Jeff Rouse. Rouse was later replaced by Randy Drake, before Di Leo returned in early 2017 to record Judas. In September 2018, a Fozzy tour was announced which listed Drake returning as the band's touring bassist. Drake would, once again, leave the band in 2020. He would be replaced by P. J. Farley of Trixter.

== Members ==
=== Current ===
Image	Name (alter ego)	Years active	Instruments	Release contributions
	Chris Jericho (Moongoose McQueen)	1999–present	lead vocals	all Fozzy releases to date
	Rich Ward (Duke LaRüe/The Duke)	1999–present	lead guitar; backing vocals; keyboards; programming	all Fozzy releases to date
	Billy Grey (Miles Biscuit)	2002 (touring); 2010–present	rhythm guitar; backing vocals	Sin and Bones (2012); Do You Wanna Start a War (2014); Judas (2017)
	P. J. Farley	2020–present	bass; backing vocals	"I Know Evil" (2026)
	Grant Brooks	2022–present	drums	"I Know Evil" (2026)

=== Former ===
Image	Name (alter ego)	Years active	Instruments	Release contributions
	Frank "Bud" Fontsere (KK LaFlame)	1999–2005; 2009–2022	drums; backing vocals	all Fozzy releases to Boombox (2022)
	Ryan Mallam (The Kidd)	1999–2004	rhythm guitar	Fozzy (2000); Happenstance (2002); All That Remains (2005)
	Dan Dryden (Shawn "Sports" Popp)	1999–2001	bass; backing vocals	Fozzy (2000)
	Keith Watson (Claude "Watty" Watson)	2001–2003	bass; backing vocals	Happenstance (2002)
	Sean Delson	2003–2011	bass	all Fozzy releases from All That Remains (2005) to Chasing the Grail (2010)
	Mike Martin	2004–2010	rhythm guitar	Live in the UK (2008); "Metal Gods" (2008); Remains Alive (2009); Chasing the Grail (2010) – one track only
	Eric Sanders	2005–2009	drums	none
	Paul Di Leo	2011–2014; 2016–2018	bass; backing vocals	Sin and Bones (2012); Do You Wanna Start a War (2014); Judas (2017)
	Jeff Rouse	2014–2015	bass; backing vocals	none
	Randy Drake	2015–2017; 2018–2020	bass; backing vocals	Boombox (2022)

=== Touring ===
Image	Name (alter ego)	Years active	Instruments	Details
	Mike "Happy" Schneider	2001	rhythm guitar	Schneider, a member of Sick Speed, performed with Fozzy during the band's early shows.
	Andy Sneap (Lord Edgar Bayden Powell)	2002–2004	rhythm guitar	Sneap performed with Fozzy on and off as a touring guitarist between 2002 and 2004.

== Lineups ==
Period	Members	Releases
1999 – November 2001	Chris Jericho – lead vocals; Rich Ward – lead guitar, keyboards, backing vocals; Frank Fontsere – drums, backing vocals; Ryan Mallam – rhythm guitar; Dan Dryden – bass, backing vocals	Fozzy (2000)
November 2001 – late 2003	Chris Jericho – lead vocals; Rich Ward – lead guitar, keyboards, backing vocals; Frank Fontsere – drums, backing vocals; Ryan Mallam – rhythm guitar; Keith Watson – bass, backing vocals	Happenstance (2002)
Late 2003 – August 2004	Chris Jericho – lead vocals; Rich Ward – lead guitar, keyboards, backing vocals; Frank Fontsere – drums, backing vocals; Ryan Mallam – rhythm guitar; Sean Delson – bass	All That Remains (2005)
November 2004 – September 2005	Chris Jericho – lead vocals; Rich Ward – lead guitar, keyboards, backing vocals; Frank Fontsere – drums, backing vocals; Sean Delson – bass; Mike Martin – rhythm guitar	Live in the UK (2008); "Metal Gods" (2008); Remains Alive (2009)
September 2005 – March 2009	Chris Jericho – lead vocals; Rich Ward – lead guitar, keyboards, backing vocals; Sean Delson – bass; Mike Martin – rhythm guitar; Eric Sanders – drums	none
March 2009 – February 2010	Chris Jericho – lead vocals; Rich Ward – lead guitar, keyboards, backing vocals; Sean Delson – bass; Mike Martin – rhythm guitar; Frank Fontsere – drums, backing vocals	Chasing the Grail (2010)
February 2010 – September 2011	Chris Jericho – lead vocals; Rich Ward – lead guitar, keyboards, backing vocals; Sean Delson – bass; Frank Fontsere – drums, backing vocals; Billy Grey – rhythm guitar, backing vocals	none
September 2011 – September 2014	Chris Jericho – lead vocals; Rich Ward – lead guitar, keyboards, backing vocals; Frank Fontsere – drums, backing vocals; Billy Grey – rhythm guitar, backing vocals; Paul Di Leo – bass, backing vocals	Sin and Bones (2012); Do You Wanna Start a War (2014)
September 2014 – 2015	Chris Jericho – lead vocals; Rich Ward – lead guitar, keyboards, backing vocals; Frank Fontsere – drums, backing vocals; Billy Grey – rhythm guitar, backing vocals; Jeff Rouse – bass, backing vocals	none
2015 – March 2017	Chris Jericho – lead vocals; Rich Ward – lead guitar, keyboards, backing vocals; Frank Fontsere – drums, backing vocals; Billy Grey – rhythm guitar, backing vocals; Randy Drake – bass, backing vocals	none
March 2017 – September 2018	Chris Jericho – lead vocals; Rich Ward – lead guitar, keyboards, backing vocals; Frank Fontsere – drums, backing vocals; Billy Grey – rhythm guitar, backing vocals; Paul Di Leo – bass, backing vocals	Judas (2017)
September 2018 – January 2022	Chris Jericho – lead vocals; Rich Ward – lead guitar, keyboards, backing vocals; Frank Fontsere – drums, backing vocals; Billy Grey – rhythm guitar, backing vocals; Randy Drake – bass, backing vocals	none
January 2022 – present	Chris Jericho – lead vocals; Rich Ward – lead guitar, keyboards, backing vocals; Billy Grey – rhythm guitar, backing vocals; P.J. Farley – bass, backing vocals; Grant Brooks – drums	none to date
