= Fozzy discography =

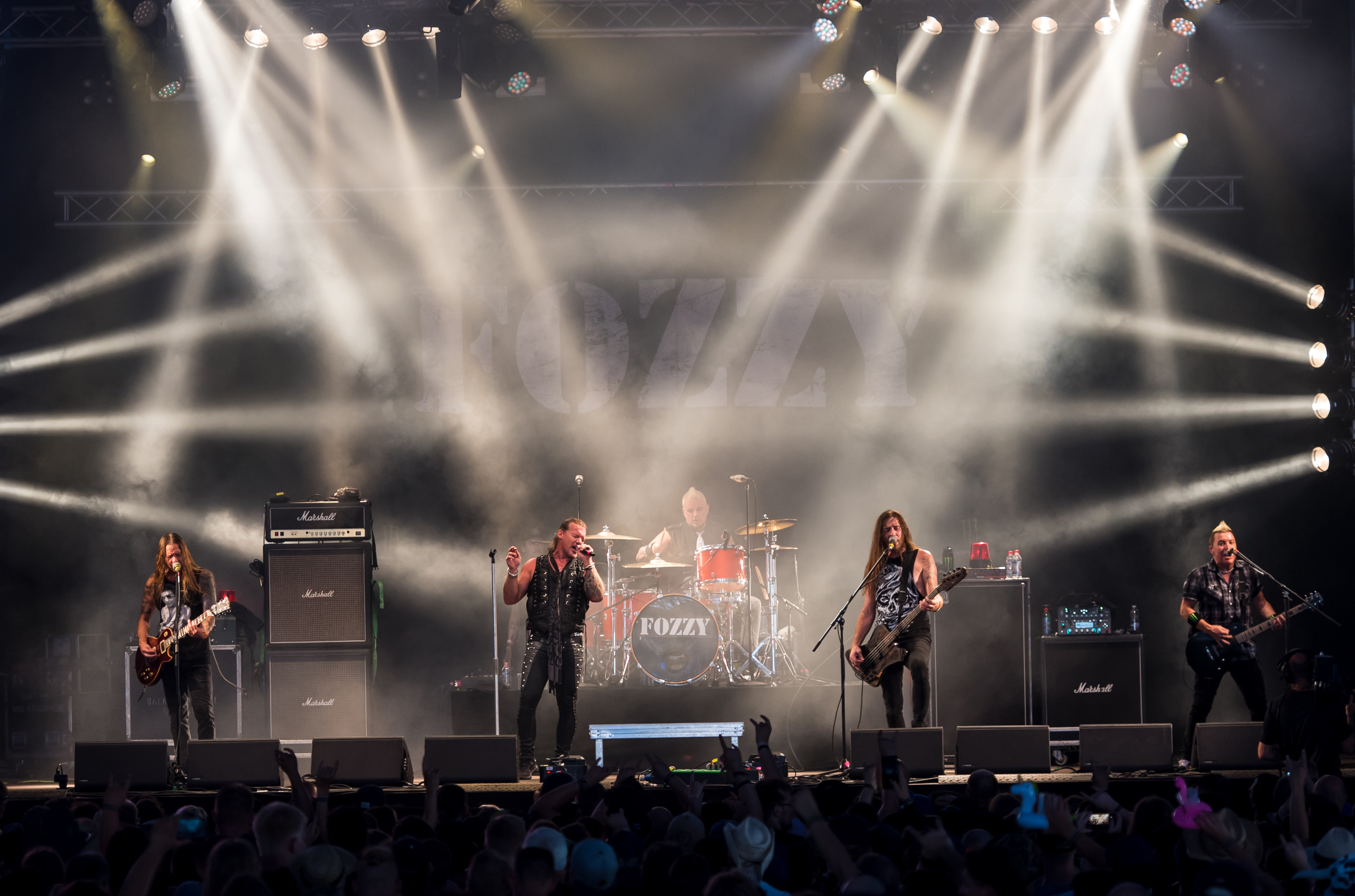
- Fozzy performing in 2018
- Studio albums: 8
- Live albums: 1
- Compilation albums: 2
- Singles: 24
- Video albums: 2
- Music videos: 10

The discography of Fozzy, a heavy metal band from Atlanta, Georgia, consists of eight studio albums, one live album, two compilation albums, two video albums, twenty-four singles and ten music videos.

The band was formed in 1999, by Chris Jericho (vocals) and Rich Ward (guitar).

== Albums ==
=== Studio albums ===
Year	Album	Peak chart positions							
Year	Album	US	US Hard	US Heat.	US Indie.	US Rock	US Sale.	SCT	UK Rock
2000	Fozzy: Released: October 24, 2000; Label: Megaforce; Format: CD	—	—	27	32	—	—	—	—
2002	Happenstance: Released: July 30, 2002; Label: Megaforce; Format: CD, digital download	—	—	32	34	—	—	—	—
2005	All That Remains: Released: January 18, 2005; Label: Ash; Format: CD, digital download	—	—	—	—	—	—	—	—
2010	Chasing the Grail: Released: January 26, 2010; Label: Riot! Entertainment; Format: CD, digital download	—	—	6	—	—	—	—	—
2012	Sin and Bones: Released: August 14, 2012; Label: Century Media; Format: CD, digital download, LP	143	13	1	25	47	143	—	15
2014	Do You Wanna Start a War: Released: July 22, 2014; Label: Century Media; Format: CD, digital download, LP	54	9	—	12	20	54	—	11
2017	Judas: Released: October 13, 2017; Label: Century Media; Format: CD, digital download, LP	147	7	—	9	30	38	79	13
2022	Boombox: Released: May 6, 2022; Label: Mascot Records; Format: CD, digital download, LP	—	—	—	—	—	—	59	10
"—" denotes albums that did not chart.

=== Live albums ===
Year	Album
2009	Remains Alive: Released: May 11, 2009; Label: Riot! Entertainment; Format: CD

=== Compilation albums ===
Year	Album
2007	Unreleased Rarities and Demos: Released: 2007; Label: Self-released; Format: CD
2008	All That Remains: Reloaded: Released: March 25, 2008; Label: Ash Records; Format: CD

=== Video albums ===
Year	Album
2003	Unleashed, Uncensored, Unknown: Released: 2003; Label: Megaforce Records; Format: DVD
2008	Live in the UK: Released: March 25, 2008; Label: Ash Records; Format: DVD

== Singles ==
Year	Single	Peak chart positions					Certifications	Album
Year	Single	US Main.	US Rock	US Rock Air.	UK Rock and Metal	UK Singles Sales	Certifications	Album
2000	"Feel the Burn"	—	×	×				Fozzy
2000	"End of Days"	—	×	×				Fozzy
2001	"Eat the Rich" (Krokus cover)	—	×	×				Fozzy
2002	"To Kill a Stranger"	—	×	×				Happenstance
2002	"With the Fire"	—	×	×				Happenstance
2003	"Crucify Yourself"	—	×	×				Happenstance
2003	"Happenstance"	—	×	×				Happenstance
2004	"Enemy"	—	×	×				All That Remains
2005	"It's a Lie" (featuring Bone Crusher)	—	×	×				All That Remains
2006	"Born of Anger" (featuring Marty Friedman)	—	×	×				All That Remains
2006	"The Test"	—	×	×				All That Remains
2009	"Martyr No More"	—	—	—				Chasing the Grail
2009	"Let the Madness Begin"	—	—	—				Chasing the Grail
2010	"Broken Soul"	—	—	—				Chasing the Grail
2012	"Sandpaper" (featuring M. Shadows)	—	—	—				Sin and Bones
2014	"Lights Go Out"	29	—	—				Do You Wanna Start a War
2014	"One Crazed Anarchist"	—	—	—				Do You Wanna Start a War
2014	"Do You Wanna Start a War"	—	—	—				Do You Wanna Start a War
2017	"Judas"	5	35	24	33	92	RIAA: Gold	Judas
2017	"Drinkin with Jesus"	—	—	—				Judas
2017	"Painless"	7	—	35				Judas
2018	"Burn Me Out"	18	—	—				Judas
2019	"Nowhere to Run"	10	—	40				Boombox
2021	"Sane"	8	—	—				Boombox
2022	"I Still Burn"	8	—	28				Boombox
2022	"Purifier"	—	—	—				Boombox
2023	"Spotlight"	8	—	—				
2024	"Army of One"	—	—	—				Boombox
2025	"Fall in Line"	—	—	—				
2025	"Crazy Train"	—	—	—	9			
2026	"I Know Evil"	15	—	—	—	—		
"—" denotes the single failed to chart, or not released. "×" denotes periods where charts did not exist or were not archived.

== Music videos ==
List of music videos, showing year released, director and album
Title	Year	Director	Album
"Eat the Rich"	2000		Fozzy
"With the Fire"	2002		Happenstance
"Enemy"	2005	Paul Hough	All That Remains
"Let the Madness Begin"	2010		Chasing The Grail
"God Pounds His Nails"	2011		Chasing The Grail
"Sandpaper"	2012		Sin and Bones
"Do You Wanna Start a War"	2014	Marco de Molina	Do You Wanna Start a War
"Judas"	2017	Nathan Mowery	Judas
"Painless"	2018	Nathan Mowery	Judas
"Burn Me Out"	2018	Nathan Mowery	Judas
"Nowhere to Run"	2019	Nathan Mowery	Boombox
"Sane"	2021	Mike Tempesta	Boombox
"I Still Burn"	2022	Jake Jones and Adrienne Beacco	Boombox
"Spotlight"	2023	Jake Jones and Adrienne Beacco	
"Fall In Line"	2025	Lawrence Hinson	
