= Boombox (Fozzy album) =

2022 studio album

Studio album by Fozzy
- Released: May 6, 2022
- Genres: Heavy metal, hard rock
- Length: 46:12
- Label: Century Media
- Producers: Johnny Andrews; Rich Ward (add.)

Fozzy chronology
Judas (2017)	Boombox (2022)

Boombox is the eighth studio album by the American heavy metal band Fozzy, released on May 6, 2022, through Mascot Records. It's the first album to feature bassist P.J. Farley and drummer Grant Brooks.

== Background ==
The band officially started recording the album in May 2019 with the song "Nowhere to Run", which was released in 2019. However due to the Covid 19 pandemic it resulted in the band holding off the release. With Chris Jericho stating the band "waited till the right time to release the record." The group officially announced the album's release in December of 2021. The 3 singles "Nowhere to Run", Sane" and "I Still Burn" all reached the top 10 on the U.S. mainstream rock chart and were all accompanied by a music video.

Jericho commented on the albums style in an interview with Wisconsin's WZOR (Razor 94.7/104.7) radio station stating:

It definitely picks up where [2017's] 'Judas' left off. And 'Judas' was such a huge hit for us that we kind of wanted to continue in the same vein — very hooky, very melodic. The three-hook rule for most of the songs. It's an old DEF LEPPARD trick. 'Oh, that's the hook. No, wait — that's the hook. No, wait — that's the hook. Oh my gosh. It's stuck in my head like a fishing lure.' And it's heavy, but it still has that punch that FOZZY's always been known for. But we really like kind of — like I said — the melodic, hooky, radio side of it as well. So we're really excited about it.

As for the albums title Jericho added: "The reason why we called it that is 'cause the last few records — 'Sin And Bones', 'Do You Wanna Start A War', 'Judas' — they're very dark titles, and when you come see us live, it's a very fun, upbeat show. And we wanted an album title that kind of brought that vibe."

Guitarist Rich Ward stated in a separate interview that he believes this is the bands best album. Adding "I feel like a Fozzy record is not right unless it lives in both words where it's got these big superhooks and at the same time has the big riffs. And I feel like we just did it [this time around]. And it took the extra year, I think, to get it right. I think if we had put this [album] out in 2020, we may not have had this magic. It took a little more time."

== Critical reception ==
Professional ratings
Review scores
Source	Rating
Metal Injection	7.5/10
Metal Hammer	3.5/5 stars
Distorted Sound	6/10
Ghost Cult Magazine	7/10
Blabbermouth.net	6/10
The Aquarian Weekly	Positive

Chad Bowar of Metal Injection gave the record a positive review, stating "Guitarist and songwriter Rich Ward is skilled at balancing radio-friendly hits aimed at the mainstream audience with harder-edge songs that satisfy the band's metal fans. That's certainly the case with this album. Opener "Sane" scratches that metal itch while still being accessible, and there are plenty of heavy but catchy riffs on "Purifier." Holly Wright of Metal Hammer also gave the album a positive review claiming "Boombox, is an album of highly stylised, somewhat brainless but ultimately very catchy metal packed with layers of artificially enhanced riffs and electronic elements crafted for mass consumption." Blabbermouth.net gave the record an average review stating "Boombox" is a worthwhile addition to a catalogue that has already outstripped all expectations." Serry Thomas of The Aquarian added "Boombox is a good time, but the significant takeaway can be found by digging deeper and listening to the words. Regardless, Fozzy has secured a spot as one of the best in hard rock and heavy metal music."

== Track listing ==
All tracks are written by Rich Ward Johnny Andrews, and Fozzy, except for "Relax", written by Peter Gill, Holly Johnson, Brian Nash and Mark O'Toole.

No.	Title	Length
1.	"Sane"	4:12
2.	"I Still Burn"	3:55
3.	"Purifier"	3:46
4.	"Army of One"	4:07
5.	"Ugly On The Inside"	4:01
6.	"Relax (Frankie Goes to Hollywood cover)"	3:58
7.	"Nowhere to Run"	3:43
8.	"My Great Wall"	3:51
9.	"What Hell Is Like"	4:00
10.	"Omen"	3:21
11.	"The Worst Is Yet To Come"	3:44
12.	"The Vulture Club"	3:34
Total length:		46:12

== Personnel ==
All personnel is taken from the info on AllMusic.

Fozzy

- Chris Jericho – vocals
- Rich Ward – guitars, vocals
- Billy Grey – guitars
- P.J. Farley – bass guitars
- Grant Brooks – drums

Additional musicians

- Doug Kees – guitar (acoustic)
- Johnny Andrews – additional background vocals
- Jordan Stephen's – violin
- Peter Searcy – cello
- Randy Drake – bass

Technical personnel

- Johnny Andrews – producer, engineer
- Rich Ward – additional production and engineering
- Jacob Hansen – mixing
- Kile Odell – mixing
- Ted Johnson – mastering

== Charts ==
Chart (2022)	Peak position
Scottish Albums (OCC)	59
UK Rock and Metal (OCC)	10
UK Album Downloads (OCC)	49
UK Albums Sales (OCC)	49
UK Physical Albums (OCC)	56
UK Independent Albums (OCC)	23
UK Independent Album Breaker (OCC)	5
