= Judas (Fozzy song) =

Single by Fozzy

from the album Judas
- Released: May 5, 2017
- Genre: Heavy metal
- Label: Century Media Records
- Songwriters: Johnny Andrews, Rich Ward, Justin Cordle
- Producers: Johnny Andrews, Rich Ward

Fozzy singles chronology
"Do You Wanna Start a War" (2014)	"Judas" (2017)	"Drinkin' with Jesus" (2017)

"Judas" is the lead single and title track from American rock band Fozzy's Judas album. On the day of its release it was accompanied by a music video. The song peaked at number 5 on the U.S. Mainstream Rock chart and reached 1 on the Sirius/XM Octane charts. "Judas" was used as the official theme song for NXT TakeOver: Chicago and lead singer Chris Jericho uses the song as his entrance theme for his appearances in New Japan Pro-Wrestling and All Elite Wrestling. The song was certified gold by the RIAA on April 13, 2022.

== Release and reception ==
The song was nominated for Hard Rock Song of the Year at the 2017 Loudwire Music Awards. The song became the band’s first and as of 2026 only recording to be certified by the RIAA with the band receiving their gold record during a show at the Gramercy Theatre in New York City on April 11.

== Performances ==
On August 27, 2023 the band played “"Judas" for Chris Jerichos entrance in front of 80,000 people at AEW All In: London. The band played the song live once again for Jerichos entrance at All In: London 2024.

== Music video ==
The song’s official music video premiered on Loudwire and features the band performing in an all-black room with vocalist Chris Jericho in the forefront. Additional cameos and actors appear in the background throughout the video.

== Charts ==
Chart (2017)	Peak position
U.S. Mainstream Rock chart (Billboard)	5
U.S. Rock & Alternative Airplay (Billboard)	24
U.S. Hot Rock & Alternative Songs	35
UK Singles Sales (Official Charts)	92
UK Singles Download (Official Charts)	90
UK Rock and Metal Singles (Official Charts)	13

== Certification ==
Certifications for "Judas"
Region	Certification	Certified units/sales
United States (RIAA)	Gold	500,000^{‡}
^{‡} Sales+streaming figures based on certification alone.

== Personnel ==
Fozzy

- Chris Jericho – vocals
- Rich Ward – guitars, vocals
- Billy Grey – guitars
- Paul Di Leo – bass guitars
- Frank Fontsere – drums
