= Mike Martin (American guitarist) =

- Also known as: 2 of 5
- Born: May 6, 1974 (age 52)
- Origin: New Hampshire
- Genres: Instrumental, progressive rock, jazz fusion, classical
- Occupations: Guitarist, Producer, Composer
- Instrument: Guitar
- Years active: 1989–present
- Labels: Digital Nations Artist, Binary/Universal Music Group
- Website: mikemartin.net

Mike Martin (born May 6, 1974) is an American guitarist, composer and producer, also known by his nickname, "2 of 5". He has worked with such bands and artists as Stuck Mojo, The Duke, Fozzy, The Mike Martin Band, Agent Cooper and The Duke. As of 2026, Martin is listed as a member of Atlanta-based rock band The Dreaded Marco.

== Discography ==
=== Stuck Mojo ===
- Southern Born Killers (2008)
- The Great Revival (2009)

=== Agent Cooper ===
- From The Ashes (EP) (2012)

=== Fozzy ===
- All That Remains Reloaded (2008)
- Chasing the Grail (2010)
- Remains Alive (2011)

=== Solo ===
- Mike Martin 2of5 (2005/2010)

=== Guest appearance ===
- Hell Bent Forever: A Tribute to Judas Priest (2008)
- Zero Chance – "Better Days for Broken Hearts" (2006)
- My Kung Fu Is Good (2005)
- Ed Wier – "Tribe" (2000)
