= Unleashed, Uncensored, Unknown =

Video by Fozzy
- Released: 2003
- Genre: Heavy metal
- Length: 150 minutes (DVD)
- Label: Megaforce Records
- Director: Lawrence O'Flahaven, Chris Jericho
- Producer: Scott Ross, Eddie DiBergi

Unleashed, Uncensored, Unknown is a 2003 mockumentary about the beginnings of American metal band Fozzy. Telling their story about going to Japan and becoming huge rock stars and when they returned to the United States after 20 years, all the big bands, such as Iron Maiden, Judas Priest, and Twisted Sister had "stolen" their songs. The main video also contains appearances by Zakk Wylde, Dee Snider, Sebastian Bach, and Mike Portnoy. Within the DVD, you also get music videos for "With the Fire", "Crucify Yourself" live, band bios, guitar lessons from Rich Ward a.k.a. The Duke, and behind the scenes footage.

== Personnel ==
- Chris Jericho (credited as Moongoose McQueen) – Lead Vocals
- Rich Ward (credited as Duke LaRüe) – lead guitar, Vocals
- Dan Dryden (credited as Shawn "Sports" Pop) – Bass guitar, Vocals
- Frank Fontsere (credited as KK LaFlame) – Drums
- Ryan Mallam (credited as The Kidd) – Rhythm Guitar
- Zakk Wylde
- Dee Snider
- Mike Portnoy
- Sebastian Bach
