= Remains Alive =

Live album by Fozzy
- Released: May 11, 2009
- Recorded: Brisbane, Australia
- Genre: Heavy metal
- Length: 68:32
- Label: Riot! Entertainment
- Producer: Rich Ward

Remains Alive is a live album from the heavy metal band Fozzy containing songs from their entire history as a band. It was released by Riot! Entertainment and was recorded in Brisbane, Australia, during their "Fozzy in Aussie" tour, in 2005. On July 5, 2011, a special edition was released containing Fozzy's 2010 album, Chasing the Grail.

== Track listing ==
1. "Nameless Faceless" (written by Rich Ward)
2. "Don't You Wish You Were Me" (written by Chris Jericho and Rich Ward)
3. "Daze of the Weak" (written by Rich Ward)
4. "Wanderlust" (written by Rich Ward)
5. "Crucify Yourself" (written by Chris Jericho and Rich Ward)
6. "End of Days" (written by Chris Jericho and Rich Ward)
7. "Freewheel Burning" (Judas Priest cover from the Defenders of the Faith album)
8. "Eat the Rich" (Krokus cover from the Headhunter album)
9. "Ignition"
10. "Feel the Burn" (written by Chris Jericho and Rich Ward)
11. "With the Fire" (written by Chris Jericho and Rich Ward)
12. "To Kill a Stranger" (written by Chris Jericho and Rich Ward)
13. "Enemy" (written by Rich Ward)

== Personnel ==
- Chris Jericho – lead vocals
- Rich Ward – rhythm & lead guitar, vocals
- Sean Delson – bass
- Mike Martin – lead guitar
- Frank Fontsere – drums
