= Enemy (Fozzy song) =

Single by Fozzy

from the album All That Remains
- Released: January 11, 2005
- Recorded: 2004
- Genre: Heavy metal
- Label: Ash Records
- Songwriters: Rich Ward, Rick Beato

Fozzy singles chronology
"Happenstance" (2003)	"Enemy" (2005)	"It's a Lie" (2005)

Audio sample
- file; help

"Enemy" is the lead single from American rock band Fozzy's All That Remains album.

== Lyrics ==
The song is about former friends, who now have become enemies and one's struggle to deal with his problems.

== Music video ==
A music video was produced for the song and was filmed on the top of a government building in San Diego. The clip was controversial in that it featured a disabled individual entering a building, where the elevators were out of service, proceeding to climb out of his wheelchair and crawl up the stairs of the large building, only to reach the top, crawl to the edge of the roof of the building and push himself off, committing suicide. It aired on Headbangers Ball and was banned after one showing.

== Release and reception ==
"Enemy" was released as the lead single to the band's third record. The song become a minor hit for Fozzy as it received airplay in over 80 stations across the US. The song is one of Fozzy's most well-known songs and has become a staple at live shows.

== In popular culture ==
"Enemy" was featured as the theme song for World Wrestling Entertainment (WWE's) No Way Out pay-per-view in 2005 and Total Nonstop Action Wrestling (TNA's) Bound for Glory pay-per-view in 2006.

== Tracks ==
1. Enemy
2. Lazarus
3. Enemy (instrumental)
4. Interview with Chris Jericho and Rich Ward

== Personnel ==
- Chris Jericho – lead vocals
- Rich Ward – guitar, backing vocals
- Frank Fontsere – drums
- Sean Delson – bass
- Mike Martin – rhythm guitar
- Jon Beato – guitar solo
