= Rahway (band) =

Hard rock band

Background information
- Genres: Hard rock
- Years active: 2004-Present
- Labels: Pavement Entertainment/Sony
- Members: David Cardenas; Steve Cardenas; Nick Hade; Tim "Chigger" Louie
- Past members: Bobby Paffrath; Steven Visconti; Greg Schumann
- Website: http://www.RahwayBand.com

Rahway is an American hard rock band formed in 2005, comprising vocalist Nick Hade, guitarist David Cardenas, drummer Steve Cardenas, and bassist Tim "Chigger" Louie. They are signed to Pavement Entertainment. Throughout the years, they have earned the moniker "Slumlords of New Jersey."

Rahway's music is characterized by a blend of hard rock and heavy metal, drawing inspiration from bands like Led Zeppelin, Guns N' Roses, Skid Row, Godsmack, and Mötley Crüe.

== History ==
Rahway was formed in the industrial town of Rahway, New Jersey. Originally named "Pushrod," the band changed its name after a suggestion from Aerosmith's Steven Tyler, who, during a collaboration with producer Jack Douglas, recommended they adopt the name of their hometown. The Cardenas brothers, David and Steve, have been musical collaborators since their youth. They met vocalist Nick Hade during a joint performance between their respective bands and invited him to join Rahway. Bassist Tim "Chigger" Louie, a veteran of the New Jersey music scene, joined the band in the late 2010s, bringing a renewed energy and focus to their music

In 2024, Rahway signed with Pavement Entertainment and their upcoming self-titled release, "Rahway", due out on July 25, 2025. The band continues to perform live, engaging with their fanbase through live shows and new music releases.

== Discography ==
- Grand Design (2016): Rahway's debut EP includes tracks like "High," "Yesterday," "Now," and "Drive Me Crazy"
- Undefeated (2017): This full album features songs such as "Undefeated," "Cage the Animal," "Racecar," and "War Machine".
- Slumlords of New Jersey (2020): The EP was produced by Mike Orlando of Adrenaline Mob at his Sonic Stomp Studios in Staten Island, NY.
- Sounds of Spanktown (2023): This EP hit #27 on the NACC Top 30 Heavy Radio Chart. The Ep was produced by Mike Orlando of Adrenaline Mob at his Sonic Stomp Studios in Staten Island.
- Rahway (self-titled) (2025): Released under Pavement Entertainment, this CD includes the songs "Carry You," "Drowning," "Rocketship," and a cover of the song "Jet" originally by Paul McCartney And Wings.

== Live performances ==
Rahway has been in the East Coast music scene for many years now, sharing stages with artists like Buckcherry, Sevendust, Slash, Three Days Grace, Godsmack, Stone Temple Pilots, Puddle of Mudd, Skid Row, KIX, Scotty Austin (Saving Able) and Ace Frehley. They've performed many gigs like, a sold out show with Greta Van Fleet at the F. M. Kirby Center, as well as notable venues such as Whisky a Go Go, Count Vamp'd, Dingbatz, The Stone Pony, Tropicana Atlantic City, and Starland Ballroom. The band also participated in events like the inaugural Food Truck and Rock Carnival in Clark, NJ (2015) and the Rock 'n Derby Festival in Schaghticoke, NY (2016).
