= Man of honor =

Man of honor or Man of Honor may refer to:

- A wedding ceremony participant; see Wedding § Wedding ceremony participants
- Made man, an initiated member of the Italian-American or Sicilian Mafia
- An alternate name of the 2011 South Korean television drama series Glory Jane

== See also ==
- Men of Honor (disambiguation)
