= Omertà (Adrenaline Mob album) =

Studio album by Adrenaline Mob
- Released: March 13, 2012
- Genres: Groove metal; heavy metal; alternative metal; hard rock
- Length: 49:38
- Labels: Elm City Music, Century Media
- Producer: Adrenaline Mob

Adrenaline Mob chronology
Omertà (2012)	Covertà (2013)

Professional ratings
Review scores
Source	Rating
About.com	3/5 stars
Thrash Hits	1.5/6 stars
BW&BK	(9/10)

Omertà (Italian pronunciation: [ɔmɛrˈta]) is the debut full-length album by American heavy metal band Adrenaline Mob. The album was released on March 13, 2012, in North America by Elm City Music, and on March 19 in Europe through Century Media Records. Omertà was produced by Adrenaline Mob and mixed by Jay Ruston, and is the only album to feature drummer Mike Portnoy.

== Track listing ==
All songs written by Mike Orlando and Russell Allen unless otherwise noted.

No.	Title	Writer(s)	Length
1.	"Undaunted"		4:44
2.	"Psychosane"		4:37
3.	"Indifferent"		4:30
4.	"All on the Line"		4:20
5.	"Hit the Wall"		6:32
6.	"Feelin' Me"		3:55
7.	"Come Undone" (Duran Duran cover feat. Lzzy Hale of Halestorm)	John Taylor, Nick Rhodes, Simon Le Bon, Warren Cuccurullo	4:50
8.	"Believe Me"		3:59
9.	"Down to the Floor"		3:33
10.	"Angel Sky"		4:25
11.	"Freight Train"		4:13

Japanese edition bonus tracks
No.	Title	Length
12.	"The Mob Rules" (Black Sabbath cover)

== Charts ==
Chart	Peak position
US Billboard 200	70

== Personnel ==
- Russell Allen – vocals
- Mike Orlando – guitars, bass, talk-box on "Psychosane"
- Mike Portnoy – drums
