= We the People (Adrenaline Mob album) =

Studio album by Adrenaline Mob
- Released: June 2, 2017
- Genre: Heavy metal, groove metal, alternative metal, hard rock
- Length: 58:13
- Label: Century Media

Adrenaline Mob chronology
Men of Honor (2014)	We the People (2017)

We the People is the third studio album by American heavy metal band Adrenaline Mob. It was released on June 2, 2017, by Century Media, and was followed by a tour. According to lead vocalist Russell Allen, the album takes a political stance. He also stated that he was inspired by the previous American election season.

It is the band's only album with bass guitarist David Zablidowsky (or simply David Z or Dave Z), as he would die in a traffic accident while touring with them later that year. Former band drummer A. J. Pero, who died in 2015, is featured on a cover of the Billy Idol song "Rebel Yell" (new drummer Jordan Cannata performs on all the other tracks). This makes We the People the final work of both Pero and Zablidowsky.

== Track listing ==
All tracks are written by Mike Orlando and Russell Allen, unless otherwise noted.

No.	Title	Length
1.	"King of the Ring"	4:21
2.	"We the People"	4:14
3.	"The Killer's Inside"	5:53
4.	"Bleeding Hands"	4:53
5.	"Chasing Dragons"	4:09
6.	"Til the Head Explodes"	4:32
7.	"What You're Made Of"	3:30
8.	"Raise 'Em Up"	5:06
9.	"Ignorance & Greed"	5:22
10.	"Blind Leading the Blind"	4:13
11.	"Violent State of Mind"	5:06
12.	"Lords of Thunder" (music by Allen)	6:00
13.	"Rebel Yell" (bonus track; Billy Idol cover; written by Idol and Steve Stevens)	5:07
Total length:		58:13

== Personnel ==
Adrenaline Mob

- Russell Allen – vocals
- Mike Orlando – guitars, bass, backing vocals
- David Zablidowsky – bass
- Jordan Cannata – drums
- A. J. Pero – drums on "Rebel Yell"

Production

- Mike Orlando - producer, engineer, mixing, mastering
- Russell Allen - producer

== Charts ==
Chart (2017)	Peak position
Dutch Albums (Album Top 100)	138
Belgian Albums (Ultratop Wallonia)	86
Swiss Albums (Schweizer Hitparade)	78
