= Adrenaline Mob =

American heavy metal band

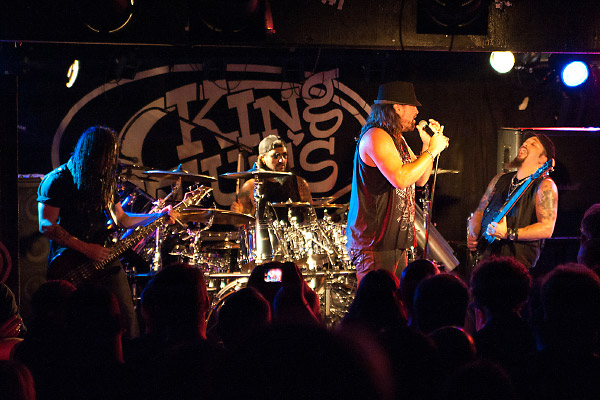
- Adrenaline Mob in 2011

Background information
- Origin: New York City, U.S.
- Genres: Heavy metal; hard rock; alternative metal; groove metal
- Years active: 2011–present (on hiatus since 2017)
- Members: Russell Allen; Mike Orlando; Jordan Cannata
- Past members: Mike Portnoy; Paul Di Leo; Rich Ward; John Moyer; A. J. Pero; Erik Leonhardt; David Zablidowsky

Adrenaline Mob is an American heavy metal supergroup formed in early 2011 by singer Russell Allen, guitarist Mike Orlando and drummer Mike Portnoy. The band's current lineup consists of Allen, Orlando, and drummer Jordan Cannata.

== History ==
The band was formed in early 2011 and had its first live performance on June 24, 2011, at the Hiro Ballroom in New York City, with the addition of bass player Paul Di Leo (Fozzy) and rhythm guitarist Rich Ward (Stuck Mojo/Fozzy). They released a YouTube video of a cover version of the Black Sabbath song "The Mob Rules" on June 27, 2011, to promote the band. On New Year's Eve 2011, Adrenaline Mob announced via their Facebook page that they would release their debut full-length studio album Omertà on March 13, 2012, and also revealed the album art.

In January 2012, Adrenaline Mob announced the departures of Rich Ward and Paul Di Leo due to scheduling conflicts with their other bands. John Moyer of Disturbed was later revealed as the band's new bass player. He made his on-stage debut with the group in March 2012 at New York City's Hiro Ballroom, a day before the release of Omertà.

The band released an EP of cover songs entitled Covertá on March 12, 2013.

In June 2013, Mike Portnoy announced via Adrenaline Mob's Facebook page that he would be playing four more shows with the band before departing. Portnoy cited scheduling conflicts that prevented him from being able "to fully commit to the band's future activities at the moment".

The band released its second studio album, Men of Honor, on February 18, 2014, in North America and on February 24, 2014, internationally. Portnoy was replaced by A. J. Pero of Twisted Sister.

In August 2014, Moyer informed his fans via Facebook and Twitter that he would not be joining Adrenaline Mob on an upcoming planned tour. In response, Adrenaline Mob announced that they were in search of a new bass player, effectively ending Moyer's tenure with the band. Shortly after, the band selected Erik Leonhardt as its new bass player. The group released a covers album, Dearly Departed, through Century Media on February 9, 2015, in Europe (digital only) and on February 10 in North America.

On March 20, 2015, drummer A.J. Pero was found unresponsive on the band's tour bus. Band members attempted but failed to wake him. The band was traveling from Baltimore to Poughkeepsie. Pero was taken to a hospital where he was declared dead from an apparent heart attack. He was 55 years old. The next day, the band performed in New Jersey with several drummers filling in for Pero, including Chad Szeliga, Johnny Kelly, and former Adrenaline Mob drummer Mike Portnoy.

On March 22, 2017, the band announced the release of a new album called We the People, with its title, album artwork and some songs inspired by the 2016 United States presidential election. They also introduced two new members: David "Dave Z" Zablidowsky (Trans-Siberian Orchestra, Jeff Scott Soto band) as the bass player and Jordan Cannata as the drummer.

While traveling to St. Petersburg, Florida for a concert in July 2017, the band's RV had pulled off I-75 in Micanopy, Florida due to a flat tire. It was then hit by a tractor trailer. Later that night, former drummer Mike Portnoy confirmed via Twitter that bassist David Zablidowsky (or simply David Z or Dave Z) had been killed. Band members Mike Orlando, Russell Allen, and Jordan Cannata were also seriously injured in the accident. Janet "Jane Train" Rains, the band's tour manager, was seriously injured in the accident, suffering significant burns. She had been taken to the University of Florida Health Shands Burn Center in Gainesville, where she remained for five weeks until her death on August 23 as a result of her injuries.

== Musical style ==
Former drummer Mike Portnoy explained in an interview that Adrenaline Mob's music is very different from that of Dream Theater and Symphony X and has absolutely nothing to do with progressive metal, calling it simply metal. Singer Russell Allen described Adrenaline Mob's music as rock music with a modern sound. He described it as a combination of Rob Zombie, Black Label Society and Disturbed with Ronnie James Dio on vocals. Guitarist Mike Orlando cited Godsmack and Shinedown as further clues to Adrenaline Mob's sound. AllMusic also compared the band's sound to that of Disturbed.

== Band members ==
Current

- Russell Allen – lead vocals (2011–present), live bass (2012; 2014; 2017–present)
- Mike Orlando – lead guitar, backing vocals (2011–present), rhythm guitar (2012–present), studio bass (2012; 2014; 2017–present)
- Jordan Cannata – drums (2016–present)

Former

- Mike Portnoy – drums, percussion, backing vocals (2011–2013)
- Paul Di Leo – bass, backing vocals (2011–2012)
- Rich Ward – rhythm guitar, backing vocals (2011–2012)
- John Moyer – bass, backing vocals (2012–2014)
- A. J. Pero – drums (2013–2015, his death)
- Erik Leonhardt – bass, backing vocals (2014–2017)
- David Zablidowsky – bass (2017, his death)

Live

- Chad Szeliga – drums (2015–2016)
- Johnny Kelly – drums (2015)
- Jay Jay French – guitars (2015)

Timeline

== Discography ==
Studio albums

Title	Album details	Peak chart positions						Sales
Title	Album details	US	SWI	GER	SWE	NLD	FIN	Sales
Omertá	Released: March 13, 2012; Label: Elm City Music/Century Media; Formats: CD, digital download	70	46	—	58	84	36	US: 6,600+
Men of Honor	Released: February 18, 2014; Label: Elm City Music/Century Media; Formats: CD, digital download	99	60	76	—	—	—	US: 3,600+
We the People	Released: June 2, 2017; Label: Century Media; Formats: CD, digital download	—	78	—	—	—	—	
"—" denotes a release that did not chart.

EPs

Title	EP details	Peak chart positions	
Title	EP details	US	NOR
Adrenaline Mob	Released: August 9, 2011; Label: Self-released; Formats: digital download	—	35
Covertà	Released: March 12, 2013; Label: Elm City Music/Century Media; Formats: CD, digital download	173	—
Dearly Departed	Released: February 10, 2015; Label: Century Media; Formats: CD, digital download (Europe Only)		
"—" denotes a release that did not chart.

== Awards and nominations ==
Metal Hammer Awards (GER)

Year	Nominee / work	Award	Result
2012	Adrenaline Mob	Best Debut	Nominated
