= Men of Honor (disambiguation) =

Men of Honor is a 2002 drama film.

Men of Honor may also refer to:

- Men of Honor (Adrenaline Mob album)
- Men of Honor (Jeremy Pelt album)
- Made man, in Mafia terms
