= The Poor (Australian band) =

Australian hard rock band

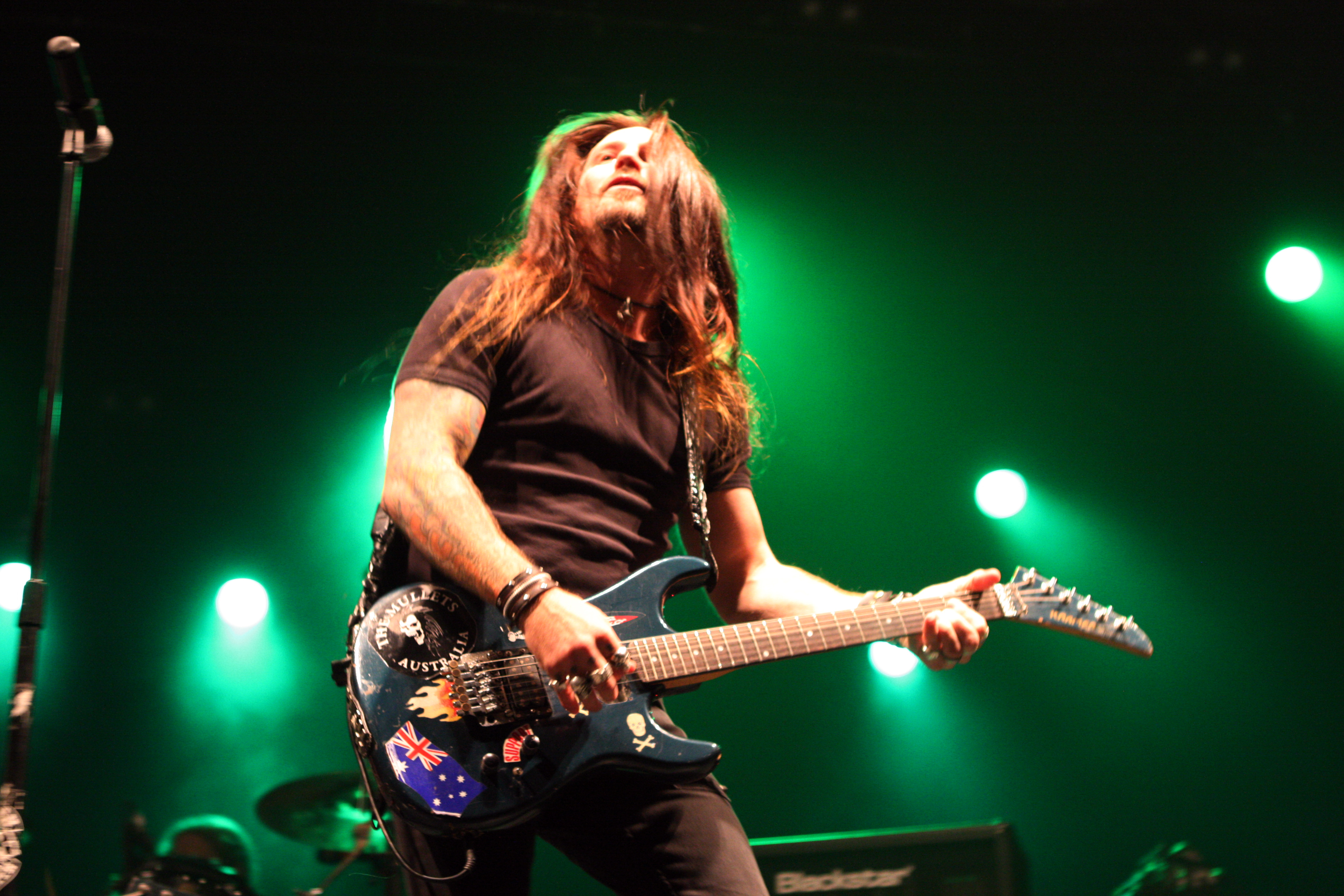

Background information
- Also known as: The Poor Boys
- Origin: Darwin, Northern Territory, Australia
- Genre: Hard rock
- Years active: 1986–2000, 2008–present
- Labels: Sony/Columbia, Riot!
- Members: Anthony "Skenie" Skene; Gavin Hansen; Daniel Cox; Stewart Williams
- Past members: Julian "RV" Grynglas; Mark Davis; Chris Risdale; James Young; Warren Reid; Matt Whitby
- Website: thepoor.com.au

The Poor are an Australian hard rock band that formed in 1986 as The Poor Boys in Darwin, Northern Territory. Their founding mainstays are Julian "RV" Grynglas on guitar, Anthony "Skenie" Skene on vocals and rhythm guitar, and Matt Whitby on bass guitar. On 13 June 1994 they released a debut album, Who Cares, on the Sony label, which peaked at No. 3 on the ARIA Albums Chart. The lead single, "More Wine Waiter Please", had appeared in the United States in March and reached No. 30 on the Billboard Hot Mainstream Rock Tracks chart. It was a top ten hit in Australia when released there in May. The Poor disbanded in 2000 but reformed in 2008 and issued two further albums, Round 1 (October 2009) and Round 2 (15 October 2010), on Riot Entertainment.

== History ==
The Poor Boys formed in 1986 in Darwin, Northern Territory. The original line-up was Mark Davis on drums, Chris Risdale on guitar, Anthony "Skenie" Skene on vocals and rhythm guitar, and Matt Whitby on bass guitar. Risdale and Skene had met in 1984 when they attended Dripstone High School together. They had met Davis and Whitby at parties in Darwin and soon were gigging together as a covers band. Risdale soon left when Warren Reid joined. After Reid left, Julian Grynglas joined and they started to write their own material.

In 1991 the group relocated to Sydney and later that year toured the United States supporting fellow Australian hard rockers, The Angels. By June 1992 James Young (ex-BB Steal) replaced Davis on drums and the group released their debut extended play, Rude, Crude & Tattooed, on Sony/Columbia Records. It was produced by The Angels' members Rick Brewster and Bob Spencer. The Poor Boys supported that group's national tour through July to August. About a year later The Poor Boys issued their second EP, Underfed, which was produced by Brent Eccles (also a member of The Angels). They followed in October by backing United States acts, Alice in Chains and Suicidal Tendencies, on the Australian leg of their combined tour.

In March 1994 The Poor Boys changed their name to The Poor to avoid confusion with a US group of the former name. That month they issued a single, "More Wine Waiter Please", in the US where it peaked at No. 30 on the Billboard Hot Mainstream Rock Tracks. In May they released it in Australia and it peaked at No. 10 on the ARIA Singles Chart. The Australian single's cover art featured a variant of the group's former logo, with the word "Boys" crossed out, to notify fans that it was the same band. On 13 June 1994 they followed with their debut studio album, Who Cares, which reached No. 3 on the ARIA Albums Chart. It was produced by United Kingdom's Paul Northfield (Suicidal Tendencies) and had been previously released in Japan on 8 April that year. Recorded in Sydney and Montreal it was also issued in the US. The Poor promoted their US releases with a tour there supporting German rockers, Scorpions. The Poor also toured Europe and Japan. In September 1994 their next single, "Poison", reached No. 48 in Australia.

Early in 1996 they opened for AC/DC's international tour. They also supported Kiss, and, in April 1998, Van Halen. In 1997 Young was replaced on drums by Gavin Hansen (ex-Rattlebone) – a friend of Whitby's. The group issued another single the following year, "Simple Livin'", intended to be the first single from the follow-up to Who Cares, however in 2000 The Poor disbanded. Various members of The Poor separated into two heavy rock groups, Lump and Blackseed. Skene related what happened after the split: "I did a small solo acoustic thing for a while. Matt was at Uni studying history. Julian was just working. Gav went back to Melbourne before moving to the Gold Coast where he grew up and started Lump with Melbourne mates Scotty and Stewie. Then I moved up and joined Lump as well!" "Simple Livin'" would later be released in 2012 on an expanded French CD version of Who Cares, collecting the B-sides from that album's singles.

The Poor reunited in April 2008 to play on an Australia tour with W.A.S.P. and soon after began recording a new album, Round 1, released in October 2009 by Riot!, comprised several older songs not previously released together with newly written tracks. Since October 2009 the group are based on the Gold Coast. In January 2010 they played at the Big Day Out on the Gold Coast. On 15 October 2010, the band released Round 2, Brian Fischer-Giffin of Loud Mag found that for this album "[The Poor] come out swinging much more convincingly, punching out a short, sharp album of no-nonsense hard rock that doesn't over stay its welcome or try to be anything more than it is. The Poor has got their mojo back".

February 2019, Guitarist Daniel Cox joined the band replacing Grynglas.

In early 2020, just before the pandemic began, the band embarked on a tour dedicated to the 40th anniversary of AC/DC's 1980 album Back in Black. The band performed the whole album in running order, with five originals. A new song, "Payback's a Bitch", was debuted at these concerts.

In late 2022, the Poor announced the release of their fourth album (first in thirteen years), High Price Deed, on 2 February 2023. The album was preceded by singles "Payback's a Bitch", "Cry Out" and "Let Me Go". On 12 December, the fourth single "Take the World" was released.

Founding bassist Whitby left the band in mid-2025, leaving Skene as the only founding member still in the band. He was replaced by ex-Lump bassist Stewart Williams.

== Band members ==
Current members

- Anthony "Skenie" Skene – vocals, guitars (1986–2000, 2008–present)
- Daniel Cox – guitars (2019–present)
- Stewart Williams - bass (2025–present)
- Gavin Hansen – drums (1997–2000, 2008–present)

Former members

- Mark Davis – drums (1986–1992)
- Chris Ridsdale – guitars (1986–1988)
- Matt Whitby – bass (1986–2000, 2008–2025)
- Warren Reid – guitars (1988–1989)
- Julian 'RV' Grynglas – guitars (1989–2000, 2008–2018)
- James Young – drums (1992–1997)

Timeline

== Discography ==
=== Albums ===
List of albums, with selected details and chart positions
Title	Details	Peak chart positions
Title	Details	AUS
Who Cares	Released: 1994; Label: Epic, 550 Music; Formats: CD, cassette	3
Round 1	Released: 2009; Label: Riot! Entertainment; Format: CD	—
Round 2	Released: 2010; Label: Riot! Entertainment; Format: CD	—
High Price Deed	Released: 2023; Label: Reckless Records; Format: Vinyl, CD, digital download	—

=== Compilations ===
- Round 1 & 2 (2011) – includes all songs from the albums Round 1 and Round 2

=== EPs ===
List of EPs, with selected details and chart positions
Title	Details	Peak chart positions
Title	Details	AUS
Rude, Crude & Tattooed (as the Poor Boys)	Released: 1992; Label: Sony Music Australia	66
Underfed (as the Poor Boys)	Released: 1993; Label: Epic	—

=== Singles ===
List of singles, with selected chart positions
Title	Year	Peak chart positions	Album
Title	Year	AUS	Album
"More Wine Waiter Please"	1994	10	Who Cares
"Poison"	1994	48	Who Cares
"Man of War"	1994	—	Who Cares
"Simple Livin'"	1998	—	Non-album single
"Payback's a Bitch"	2022	—	High Price Deed
"Cry Out"	2022	—	High Price Deed
"Let Me Go"	2022	—	High Price Deed
"Take the World"	2022	—	High Price Deed
"Lover"	2023	—	High Price Deed
