= Covertà =

EP by Adrenaline Mob
- Released: March 12, 2013
- Genres: Heavy metal, hard rock
- Length: 34:23
- Label: Elm City Music
- Producer: Adrenaline Mob

Adrenaline Mob chronology
Omertà (2012)	Covertà (2013)	Men of Honor (2014)

Professional ratings
Review scores
Source	Rating
AllMusic	4/5 stars

Covertà is the first official EP by American heavy metal band Adrenaline Mob. It was released on March 12, 2013, in North America by Elm City Music. As the title suggests, the EP consists entirely of cover songs. It is the first Adrenaline Mob release to feature bassist John Moyer, and the last with drummer Mike Portnoy.

== Track listing ==
No.	Title	Length
1.	"High Wire" (Badlands cover)	3:48
2.	"Stand Up and Shout" (Dio cover)	3:35
3.	"Break On Through" (The Doors cover)	3:01
4.	"Romeo Delight" (Van Halen cover)	5:08
5.	"Barracuda" (Heart cover)	4:12
6.	"Kill the King" (Rainbow cover)	4:33
7.	"The Lemon Song" (Led Zeppelin cover)	6:49
8.	"The Mob Rules" (Black Sabbath cover)	3:17

== Charts ==
Chart	Position
US Billboard 200	173

== Personnel ==
- Russell Allen – vocals
- Mike Orlando – guitars (bass on "The Mob Rules")
- John Moyer – bass (except on "The Mob Rules")
- Mike Portnoy – drums
