= Men of Honor (Adrenaline Mob album) =

Studio album by Adrenaline Mob
- Released: February 18, 2014
- Genre: Heavy metal, hard rock, alternative metal, groove metal
- Length: 54:49
- Label: Elm City Music
- Producer: Mike Orlando, Russell Allen

Adrenaline Mob chronology
Covertà (2013)	Men of Honor (2014)	We the People (2017)

Men of Honor is the second studio album by American heavy metal band Adrenaline Mob. It was released on February 18, 2014, by Century Media Records. It is the only Adrenaline Mob release with drummer A. J. Pero fully involved; he would die in 2015, but be featured on a single track of the following album, We the People. The album's tracks were revealed one by one via streaming at SoundCloud, with each new track being released every week.

According to guitarist Mike Orlando, the album's title was suggested by his father. "We were thinking about names for the record, and he said 'Why don't you guys call it 'Uomini D'Onore' [translation: 'Men of Honor']?' I knew that was it. We're tight like brothers. This is a musical gang. The message is to stand strong with Adrenaline Mob. Regardless of what's changed, we are men of honor, and we will honor this entity until we die."

== Track listing ==
All songs written by Mike Orlando and Russell Allen unless otherwise noted.

No.	Title	Length
1.	"Mob Is Back"	4:35
2.	"Come on Get Up"	4:13
3.	"Dearly Departed"	4:57
4.	"Behind These Eyes"	5:08
5.	"Let It Go"	3:54
6.	"Feel the Adrenaline"	5:57
7.	"Men of Honor"	4:27
8.	"Crystal Clear"	5:03
9.	"House of Lies"	3:56
10.	"Judgment Day"	4:06
11.	"Fallin' to Pieces"	4:58
12.	"Gets You Through the Night"	3:35
Total length:		54:49

iTunes bonus track
No.	Title	Length
13.	"Crystal Clear (Acoustic Version)"	5:03

Japanese bonus tracks
No.	Title	Length
13.	"All on the Line (Acoustic Version)"
14.	"Angel Sky (Acoustic Version)"

Limited edition bonus disc – Covertá EP
No.	Title	Writer(s)	Original artist (date)	Length
1.	"High Wire"	Lee, Gillen	Badlands
2.	"Stand Up and Shout"	Bain, Dio	Dio
3.	"Break On Through"	Morrison, Densmore, Manzarek, Krieger	Doors
4.	"Romeo Delight"	Van Halen, Roth, Van Halen, Anthony	Van Halen
5.	"Barracuda"	Wilson, DeRosier, Wilson, Fisher	Heart
6.	"Kill the King"	Powell, Blackmore, Dio	Rainbow
7.	"The Lemon Song"	Bonham, Page, Jones, Plant	Led Zeppelin
8.	"The Mob Rules"	Butler, Dio, Iommi	Black Sabbath

== Personnel ==
Adrenaline Mob

- Russell Allen – vocals, production
- Mike Orlando – guitars, backing vocals, additional vocals on "Come On Get Up", "Let It Go", "Judgement Day", production, mastering, mixing
- John Moyer – bass
- A. J. Pero – drums

Additional personnel

- Asha Mevlana – violin on "Men of Honor"
- Mark Sasso – artwork, design, layout
- Larry Mazer – management
- Mark "Weissguy" Weiss – photography
