= Paul Di Leo =

American bassist

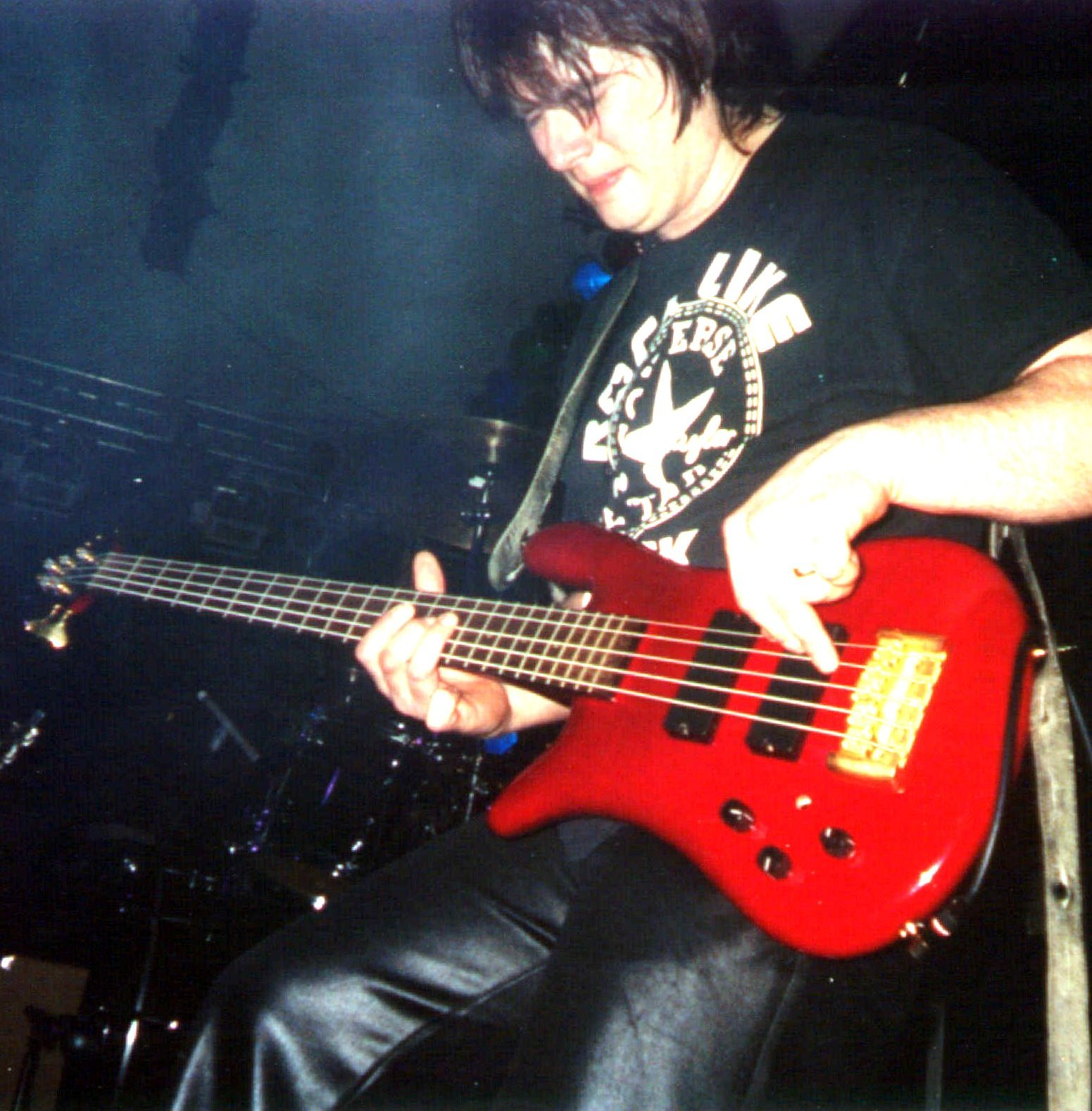

Background information
- Genres: Rock, pop, heavy metal
- Occupation: Musician
- Instrument: Bass guitar
- Years active: 1990–present
- Member of: Nena
- Formerly of: Adrenaline Mob, Fozzy
- Website: pauldileo.com

Paul Di Leo is an American bassist who has played for German pop/rock singer Nena and the American heavy metal bands Adrenaline Mob and Fozzy.

== Career ==
=== Nena ===
Di Leo has been a member of Nena since 2001 and is still touring with the singer in Germany and abroad. He played on several Nena albums such as Willst du mit mir gehn (2005) or Made in Germany (2009).

=== Adrenaline Mob ===
In 2011, Di Leo joined the newly formed heavy metal supergroup Adrenaline Mob alongside Rich Ward (of Stuck Mojo and Fozzy), Mike Portnoy (of Dream Theater), Russell Allen (of Symphony X), and Mike Orlando.

In January 2012, citing a need to concentrate on other projects, he and Ward left the band.

=== Fozzy ===
With Sean Delson's announcement to leave Fozzy to pursue other musical interests, Fozzy announced Di Leo as Delson's replacement on September 9, 2011. Di Leo was already known to the group as he had played with Fozzy co-founder Rich Ward in Adrenaline Mob. Di Leo's first show as a member of Fozzy was at the House of Blues in Paradise, Nevada on October 15.

A month later, Fozzy (with Di Leo) landed in the United Kingdom for their "The Madness Returns – Winter 2011" tour. The band played back-to-back shows in Reading, Southampton, Cardiff, Leeds, Nottingham, Glasgow, York, Wrexham, Plymouth, High Wycombe and Brighton, between November 2–13, before departing to tour in Germany, the Netherlands and Denmark.

On January 18, 2012, Fozzy announced that they had signed with Century Media Records and subsequent plans to release their fifth studio album during the Summer. Fozzy's fifth studio album and debut with Century Media is entitled Sin and Bones and is set for an August release. On July 10, Fozzy released their first single from their new album, as "Sandpaper" (featuring M. Shadows of Avenged Sevenfold) was published onto YouTube with an "Evolution of Fozzy" video. "Sandpaper" became available for download on iTunes on July 17.

Despite his absence on stage, Di Leo recorded three albums with the band: Sin and Bones in 2011, Do You Wanna Start a War in 2014 and Judas in 2017.
