= Fozzy (album) =

Studio album by Fozzy
- Released: October 24, 2000
- Recorded: AudioArt Studios, Smyrna, Georgia; July–September 2000
- Genre: Heavy metal
- Length: 39:58
- Label: Palm Pictures / Megaforce Records
- Producer: John Briglevich; Fozzy

Fozzy chronology
Fozzy (2000)	Happenstance (2002)

Singles from Fozzy
- 1. "Feel the Burn" Released: 2000; 2. "End of Days" Released: 2000; 3. "Eat the Rich" Released: 2001

Fozzy is the debut album of heavy metal band, Fozzy. The album was released on October 24, 2000. The album was released by Palm Pictures and Megaforce Records.

== Album concept ==
The album featured mostly cover songs by bands such as Dio, Twisted Sister, Iron Maiden, Ozzy Osbourne and Mötley Crüe, as Fozzy had a satirical back-story that they had spent the last 20 years in Japan being megastars and once they returned to America, they realized that many famous artists had ripped off their songs.

However, the album featured two original songs by Fozzy, "End of Days" and "Feel the Burn", in which it was implied that the band had just recently written these songs and other bands hadn't had the chance to "rip" these songs off them.

== Release and reception ==
Professional ratings
Review scores
Source	Rating
Allmusic	2.5/5 stars

Prior to the album's release, Megaforce had high hopes for the record, as they expected wrestling fans of the Attitude Era boom period to flock to Fozzy and buy the record. However, the album failed commercially and only managed to sell 4,225 copies. The album also failed to chart on the Billboard 200. Due to the poor commercial reception of the album, Megaforce cancelled plans for the release of the album in Europe and a Fozzy documentary DVD as well as several other endorsements and appearances.

== Singles ==
1. "Feel the Burn"
2. "End of Days"
3. "Eat the Rich"

== Track listing ==
No.	Title	Writer(s)	Length
1.	"Stand Up and Shout" (Dio cover)	Ronnie James Dio, Jimmy Bain	3:39
2.	"Eat the Rich" (Krokus cover)	Butch Stone, Marc Storace, Fernando von Arb, Chris von Rohr	4:05
3.	"Stay Hungry" (Twisted Sister cover)	Dee Snider	2:57
4.	"The Prisoner" (Iron Maiden cover)	Adrian Smith, Steve Harris	6:19
5.	"Live Wire" (Mötley Crüe cover)	Nikki Sixx	3:15
6.	"End of Days"	Rich Ward, Chris Jericho	3:55
7.	"Over the Mountain" (Ozzy Osbourne cover)	Ozzy Osbourne, Randy Rhoads, Bob Daisley, Lee Kerslake	4:32
8.	"Blackout" (Scorpions cover)	Sonja Kittelsen, Klaus Meine, Herman Rarebell, Rudolf Schenker	3:39
9.	"Feel the Burn"	Ward, Jericho	4:24
10.	"Riding on the Wind" (Judas Priest cover)	Glenn Tipton, Rob Halford, K. K. Downing	3:09
Total length:			39:58

== Personnel ==
=== Musicians ===
- Chris Jericho (credited as Moongoose McQueen) – lead vocals
- Rich Ward (credited as Duke LaRüe) – guitar, backing vocals
- Dan Dryden (credited as Shawn "Sports" Pop) – bass, backing vocals
- Frank Fontsere (credited as KK LaFlame) – drums
- Ryan Mallam (credited as The Kidd) – guitar

=== Additional musicians ===
- Butch Walker (Marvelous 3) – guitar solo and additional vocals on "Over the Mountain"
- Andy Sneap – extra lead vocals on "Blackout"

=== Production ===
- Michael Alago – executive producer
- John Briglevich – producer, engineer
- Fozzy – producers
- Andy Sneap – mixer
