= Happenstance (Fozzy album) =

Studio album by Fozzy
- Released: July 30, 2002
- Recorded: Brannon Productions; Atlanta, Georgia
- Genre: Heavy metal
- Length: 48:07
- Label: Megaforce
- Producer: Rich Ward; Shawn Grove

Fozzy chronology
Fozzy (2000)	Happenstance (2002)	All That Remains (2005)

Singles from Happenstance
- 1. "To Kill a Stranger" Released: 2002; 2. "With the Fire" Released: 2002; 3. "Crucify Yourself" Released: 2003; 4. "Happenstance" Released: 2003

Happenstance is the second studio album by heavy metal band Fozzy. For the album, the band continue with their spoof that they had spent the last 20 years in Japan being megastars and once they returned to America, they realized that many famous artists have ripped off their songs. The album therefore features covers of songs by bands such as Iron Maiden, Judas Priest, Black Sabbath, W.A.S.P., Scorpions and Accept. However, the album also features five original songs by Fozzy.

== Reception ==
Professional ratings
Review scores
Source	Rating
Allmusic	3/5 stars

The album had little commercial success as it went on to sell fewer copies than its predecessor. It managed to reach at number 34 on the Independent Albums charts. Allmusic reviewer Bradley Torreano gave the album 3 out of 5 stars and praised the songs "To Kill a Stranger" and "Happenstance".

== Singles ==
1. "To Kill a Stranger"
2. "With the Fire"
3. "Crucify Yourself"
4. "Happenstance"

== Track listing ==
All tracks are written by Rich Ward and Chris Jericho, except where noted.

No.	Title	Writer(s)	Length
1.	"Whitechapel 1888"	Scott Banks	1:00
2.	"To Kill a Stranger"		4:00
3.	"Happenstance"		5:01
4.	"Freewheel Burning" (Judas Priest cover)	Glenn Tipton, Rob Halford, K. K. Downing	4:48
5.	"The Mob Rules" (Black Sabbath cover)	Ronnie James Dio, Geezer Butler, Tony Iommi	3:19
6.	"Big City Nights" (Scorpions cover)	Klaus Meine, Rudolf Schenker	4:25
7.	"Crucify Yourself"		4:30
8.	"L.O.V.E. Machine" (W.A.S.P. cover)	Blackie Lawless	4:11
9.	"Balls to the Wall" (Accept cover)	Peter Baltes, Udo Dirkschneider, Wolf Hoffmann, Stefan Kaufmann, Deaffy	5:46
10.	"With the Fire"	Ward, Jericho, Keith Watson	4:44
11.	"Where Eagles Dare" (Iron Maiden cover)	Steve Harris	6:19
Total length:			48:07

== Charts ==
Chart (2002)	Peak position
US Independent Albums	34

== Personnel ==
=== Musicians ===
- Chris Jericho (credited as Moongoose McQueen) – lead vocals
- Rich Ward (credited as Duke LaRüe) – guitar, backing vocals
- Frank Fontsere (credited as KK LaFlame) – drums, backing vocals
- Ryan Mallam (credited as The Kidd) – guitar
- Keith Watson (credited as Claude "Watty" Watson) – bass

== Bibliography ==
- Jericho, Chris; Fornatale, Thomas (2011). Undisputed: how to become the world champion in 1,372 easy steps. New York, New York: Grand Central Publishing. 448pp. ISBN 978-0-446-53815-2.
