= Judas (Fozzy album) =

Studio album by Fozzy
- Released: October 13, 2017
- Genre: Heavy metal, hard rock
- Length: 41:35
- Label: Century Media
- Producer: Johnny Andrews; Rich Ward (add.)

Fozzy chronology
| Do You Wanna Start a War (2014) | Judas (2017) | Boombox (2022) |

Singles from Judas
- 1. "Judas" Released: May 5, 2017; 2. "Drinkin' with Jesus" Released: September 15, 2017; 3. "Painless" Released: September 29, 2017; 4. "Burn Me Out" Released: July 21, 2018

30 second sample of the song "Judas".

Judas is the seventh studio album by the American heavy metal band Fozzy, released on October 13, 2017, through Century Media Records. The album's title track was released as the lead single from the album on May 5, 2017. Ahead of the album release, two additional songs were made available on streaming services: "Drinkin' with Jesus" on September 15, 2017, and "Painless" on September 29, 2017.

The lead single was a minor radio hit, spending 26 weeks on the Mainstream Rock chart and peaking at No. 5. The song also hit No. 1 on the Sirius/XM Octane charts and was certified gold by the RIAA in 2022. "Judas" was the official theme song for NXT TakeOver: Chicago and lead singer Chris Jericho uses the song as his entrance theme for his appearances in New Japan Pro-Wrestling and All Elite Wrestling. "Painless" was the official theme song for NXT TakeOver: Chicago II the following year.

== Background ==
In a 2017 interview with Blabbermouth.net Chris Jericho stated

“We spent the last two years on this. We really wanted it to be a record that had not just two singles, but three singles, where every song could be a single, like the classic records like [GUNS N' ROSES'] 'Appetite For Destruction' or [DEF LEPPARD's] 'Hysteria' or INXS 'Kick', where it's just single after single after single on the record. You never knew how many great songs there were on it. That's what we wanted to do. We just wanted to focus on songs and not worry about whether it has a guitar solo or wussy strings. After two years of a lot of work and reconfiguring the songs and working on them over and over, we achieved that."

== Critical reception ==
Loudwire gave the album a favorable review stating “Judas is their most polished and fully realized album, and should be their most successful, as well.” The Moshville times gave the record a positive review stating “It’s an album which starts off good and with every listen gets better. In Judas, Fozzy have made their best album to date, taking everything which makes them and dials it up to the proverbial eleven. With a less cohesive sound than previous albums, they’ve tinkered with it in places, adding in playful new elements and for the most part it works. More important than that, it’s still recognisably Fozzy.” The Angry Metal Guy gave the album a more negative review giving it a 2.5/5 stating “Drinkin with Jesus” and “Weight of my World” are decent pieces. But the rest of the songs are pretty forgettable. The final three songs, in particular, seem to continue to fall away until I finally look up and realize the album is over.”

== Track listing ==
All tracks are written by Rich Ward and Johnny Andrews, except where noted.

| No. | Title | Writer(s) | Length |
|---|---|---|---|
| 1. | "Judas" | Ward, Andrews, Justin Cordle | 4:10 |
| 2. | "Drinkin' with Jesus" | | 3:56 |
| 3. | "Painless" | | 3:59 |
| 4. | "Weight of My World" | | 3:19 |
| 5. | "Wordsworth Way" | Ward, Chris Jericho, Andrews | 4:47 |
| 6. | "Burn Me Out" | | 4:03 |
| 7. | "Three Days in Jail" (featuring Hyro the Hero) | Ward, Andrews, Jericho, Hyro Da Hero | 4:16 |
| 8. | "Elevator" | Ward, Andrews, Matt Walst, Simon Olds | 2:50 |
| 9. | "Running with the Bulls" | Ward, Andrews, Jericho | 3:51 |
| 10. | "Capsized" | | 4:16 |
| 11. | "Wolves at Bay" | | 3:09 |
| Total length: | | | 41:35 |

== Personnel ==
Fozzy

- Chris Jericho – vocals
- Rich Ward – guitars, vocals
- Billy Grey – guitars
- Paul Di Leo – bass guitars
- Frank Fontsere – drums

Additional musicians

- Renny Carroll – additional background vocals
- Johnny Andrews – additional background vocals

Technical personnel

- Johnny Andrews – producer, engineer
- Rich Ward – additional production and engineering
- Jay Ruston – mixing
- Paul Logus – mastering

== Charts ==
| Chart (2017) | Peak position |
|---|---|
| Scottish Albums (OCC) | 79 |
| UK Rock and Metal (OCC) | 13 |
| UK Album Downloads (OCC) | 72 |
| UK Albums Sales (OCC) | 95 |
| US Billboard 200 | 147 |
| US Top Rock Albums (Billboard) | 30 |
| US Top Hard Rock Albums (Billboard) | 7 |
| US Independent Albums (Billboard) | 9 |
