= Chasing the Grail =

Studio album by Fozzy
- Released: January 26, 2010
- Genre: Heavy metal
- Length: 65:02
- Label: Riot! Entertainment
- Producer: Rich Ward

Fozzy chronology
All That Remains (2005)	Chasing the Grail (2010)	Sin and Bones (2012)

Singles from Chasing The Grail
- 1. "Martyr No More" Released: September 8, 2009; 2. "Let The Madness Begin" Released: October 16, 2009; 3. "Broken Soul" Released: March 2010

Professional ratings
Review scores
Source	Rating
Hard Rock Hideout	9/10 stars
Roadrunner	(4.75/5)
Allmusic	3.5/5 stars
The Rock Maiden	5/5 stars
About.com	3.5/5 stars
411mania.com	7.5/10 stars
The Silver Tongue	4/5 stars

Chasing the Grail is the fourth studio album by American heavy metal band Fozzy, released on January 26, 2010. It was their first album since All That Remains five years prior, and is their first and only album as a four-piece.

== Background ==
In March 2009, the band announced that Riot Entertainment had signed the group to a worldwide deal for the release of a new album. According to guitarist Rich Ward, Riot is the only label worthy of releasing the album. According to lead vocalist Chris Jericho, "For the first time, Fozzy has a ballad on the album and a 14-minute prog rock-inspired tune called 'Wormwood'". According to Jericho, the song "Broken Soul" is a "70s-type Southern rock-type ballady-type tune". In June 2009, the band was finishing the last details of the album.

== Release and reception ==
The album was released through Riot Entertainment on January 26. The album did not chart on the Billboard 200, it did however, chart on the Heatseekers Album charts, reaching number 6 at its peak. The album sold a little over 2,000 copies in its first week.

== Singles ==
=== "Martyr No More" ===
On September 8, 2009, the band released the first material from the album, "Martyr No More", along with the album art and a release date of January 26, 2010.

"Martyr No More" was used as one of the official theme songs for the 2010 WWE Royal Rumble pay per view.

=== "Let the Madness Begin" ===
On October 16, 2009, the band released the second single from the album, entitled "Let the Madness Begin".

Rich Ward on "Let the Madness Begin"

"[That particular track] is all about the balance between a really good, classic melody and a great, classic rock riff. That was our focus for the whole record, but I think 'Let the Madness Begin' is probably the one song on the album where I think that balance is best.

"Sometimes when you're trying to write a heavy album, you find that sometimes you'll end up compromising the melody for the riff because obviously, the riff is so important for the drum part. On some rock albums, the vocals become the focus, and then the music takes a backseat. We tried to find that fine line where the music was important and the melody was important. We treated them as equals, and I think 'Let the Madness Begin' was that perfect balance between hard rock melodic vocals and a big metal riff."

On July 22, Fozzy released the music video for their second single, "Let the Madness Begin", which was a compilation of the band performing the song from multiple concerts in the U.S. and U.K. in the early portion on 2010.

=== "Broken Soul" ===
In March 2010, Fozzy released their third single, "Broken Soul".

== Track listing ==
All tracks are written by Rich Ward and Chris Jericho, except where noted

No.	Title	Writer(s)	Length
1.	"Under Blackened Skies"	Ward, Jericho, Eric Sanders	5:32
2.	"Martyr No More"		4:36
3.	"Grail"		5:09
4.	"Broken Soul"		4:09
5.	"Let the Madness Begin"		3:47
6.	"Pray for Blood"		5:11
7.	"New Day's Dawn"		4:34
8.	"God Pounds His Nails"		4:20
9.	"Watch Me Shine"		3:38
10.	"Paraskavedekatriaphobia (Friday the 13)"		5:26
11.	"Revival"	Ward	4:47
12.	"Wormwood"	Jericho, Mike Martin	13:53
Total length:			65:02

Japan edition bonus tracks
No.	Title	Length
13.	"Nameless Faceless" (Live)
14.	"Don't You Wish You Were Me" (Live)

== Charts ==
Chart (2010)	Peak position
US Heatseeker Albums	6

== Personnel ==
=== Musicians ===
- Chris Jericho – lead vocals
- Rich Ward – guitar, backing vocals
- Sean Delson – bass
- Frank Fontsere – drums

=== Additional musicians ===
- Eric Frampton – Hammond organ, piano, keyboards
- Renny Carroll (Forever Never) – harmony backing vocals
- Jeff Waters – guitar solos on "Martyr No More" and "God Pounds His Nails"
- Mike Martin – producer, all guitars and backing vocals on "Wormwood"
- Lord Nelson – Revelator on "Wormwood"
- Rosemary Serpa, John Martin, Mike Martin, Sarah Martin, Tiffany Martin, Sophia Martin, Danny Messier and Katie Messier @ St. Michael's Episcopal Charleston, SC – choir vocals on "Wormwood"
