= All That Remains (album) =

Studio album by Fozzy
- Released: January 18, 2005
- Genres: Alternative metal; heavy metal; nu metal
- Length: 40:22
- Label: Ash
- Producers: Chris Jericho; Rick Beato

Fozzy chronology
Happenstance (2002)	All That Remains (2005)	Chasing the Grail (2010)

All That Remains: Reloaded
- 2008 reissue

Singles from All That Remains
- 1. "Enemy" Released: January 11, 2005; 2. "It's a Lie" Released: 2005; 3. "Born of Anger" Released: 2006; 4. "The Test" Released: 2006

Professional ratings
Review scores
Source	Rating
Allmusic	3.5/5 stars

All That Remains is the third studio album by the American heavy metal band Fozzy. Unlike the band's two previous albums, All That Remains features all original songs as the band had dropped their spoof in favor of becoming a more recognized band rather than a gimmick, with the members using their actual names instead of stage names. It features Alter Bridge members Myles Kennedy and Mark Tremonti, Black Label Society's Zakk Wylde, rapper Bone Crusher, and Megadeth guitarist Marty Friedman.

A remastered version of All That Remains, entitled All That Remains: Reloaded, was released on March 25, 2008. It is a two-disc set that features the album and a DVD called Live in the UK.

== Writing and recording ==
The album, the band knew that they had their work cut out for them recording an all-original album for the first time. The band decided to record no filler material feeling every song had to be good. Rich Ward wrote all of the music and melodies while Chris Jericho wrote the lyrics with Ed Aborn, a friend of the band. The band recorded the album at Tree Sound Studios in Atlanta, and they used the same soundboard that was used on the album Synchronicity by the Police and Rush's Moving Pictures. Elton John was also in the complex at the time recording his Peachtree Road album, and Alter Bridge were recording their album One Day Remains. Jericho went downstairs to Alter Bridge's studio and asked Mark Tremonti to do a guest solo on the track "The Way I Am", and Myles Kennedy laid down backing vocals. The band's producer was friends with Megadeth guitarist Marty Friedman who agreed to lay down a solo for "Born of Anger". Zakk Wylde also played a solo for the song "Wanderlust". Due to conflicts between Fozzy and their record company Megaforce/Palm, the band decided to record their third effort on their own label, Ash Records.

== Release and reception ==
The album was released January 19, 2005, and proved to be Fozzy's breakthrough album as it reached considerable commercial and critical success, mainly due to the success of their controversial lead single "Enemy". The record went on to sell little over 100,000 copies but was praised by many rock magazines. The album's lead single "Enemy" and "Nameless Faceless" achieved moderated success with "Enemy" receiving airplay on over 80 stations across the US. "Enemy" was featured as the theme song for World Wrestling Entertainment (WWE's) No Way Out pay-per-view in 2005 and Total Nonstop Action Wrestling (TNA's) Bound for Glory pay-per-view in 2006. "Nameless Faceless" reaching number 4 on the charts at XM Radio.

== Tour ==
Due to the success of the album, the band embarked on a tour between February 2005 to February 2006, where they went to England, Canada, Germany, Australia and America. The band also got to play three times at the Astoria, one of the most prestigious venues in London where such popular acts like Metallica and The Beatles had once played. The band sold out the venue on all three nights. The band also took part of the 2005 Download Festival at Donington Park where they performed in front of 20,000 people and were met with positive reviews with Kerrang! magazine calling them "the surprise hit of the day". Their time in England was highlighted in their All That Remains: Reloaded DVD "Live in the UK".

== Track listing ==
No.	Title	Writer(s)	Length
1.	"Nameless Faceless" (featuring Myles Kennedy)	Rich Ward, Chris Jericho, Ed Aborn	3:30
2.	"Enemy"	Ward, Rick Beato	4:28
3.	"Wanderlust" (featuring Zakk Wylde)	Ward, Jericho	4:16
4.	"All That Remains"	Ward, Aborn, Jericho	4:35
5.	"The Test"	Ward	3:08
6.	"It's a Lie" (featuring Bone Crusher)	Ward, Jericho, Aborn	4:28
7.	"Daze of the Weak"	Ward, Jericho, Aborn	4:20
8.	"The Way I Am" (featuring Mark Tremonti)	Ward	4:12
9.	"Lazarus"	Ward, Aborn, Jericho	4:03
10.	"Born of Anger" (featuring Marty Friedman)	Ward, Aborn, Jericho, Frank Fontsere	4:42
Total length:			40:22

=== Singles ===
- "Enemy"
- "It's a Lie" (feat. Bone Crusher)
- "Born of Anger" (feat. Marty Friedman)
- "The Test"

== Personnel ==
=== Musicians ===
- Chris Jericho – lead vocals
- Rich Ward – guitar, backing vocals
- Ryan Mallam – lead guitar
- Sean Delson – bass
- Frank Fontsere – drums
