= Do You Wanna Start a War =

Studio album by Fozzy
- Released: July 22, 2014
- Genre: Heavy metal, hard rock
- Length: 45:18
- Label: Century Media Records
- Producer: Rich Ward

Fozzy chronology
Sin and Bones (2012)	Do You Wanna Start a War (2014)	Judas (2017)

Singles from Do You Wanna Start a War
- 1. "Lights Go Out" Released: April 29, 2014; 2. "One Crazed Anarchist" Released: May 26, 2014; 3. "Do You Wanna Start a War" Released: November 6, 2014

Professional ratings
Review scores
Source	Rating
AllMusic	3.5/5 stars
Blabbermouth.net	7.5/10 stars

Do You Wanna Start a War is the sixth studio album by American heavy metal band Fozzy. It was released on July 22, 2014, through Century Media Records. It is the band's first album to feature the same lineup as the previous one.

== Background ==
In 2013, it was confirmed that Fozzy would begin working on a new record in 2014 and would be looking for a release date during the summer of 2014. The band entered the studio in late January. The first single, "Lights Go Out", was released on April 29. Following the release of the new single, the band embarked on the Lights Go Out Tour to promote their new album, playing festivals such as Carolina Rebellion, Rock on the Range, and Download Festival (where they performed on the main stage for the first time in their history). The second single, "One Crazed Anarchist" – also the title of singer Chris Jericho's entrance theme when he performed for World Championship Wrestling (WCW) – was released on May 26 and was given away to people that pre-ordered the album. The album was released on July 22 in North America.

== Reception ==
The album premiered at No. 54 on the US Billboard 200 chart and marks the band's best-selling first week ever, selling approximately 5,600 copies in its first week.

== Track listing ==
All tracks are written by Rich Ward and Chris Jericho, except where noted.

No.	Title	Writer(s)	Length
1.	"Do You Wanna Start a War"		3:41
2.	"Bad Tattoo"		4:00
3.	"Lights Go Out"	Johnny Andrews, Rich Ward	3:12
4.	"Died with You"		3:32
5.	"Tonight" (featuring Michael Starr)	Rich Ward	3:31
6.	"Brides of Fire"		4:02
7.	"One Crazed Anarchist"		3:58
8.	"Unstoppable" (featuring Christie Cook)		3:51
9.	"Scarecrow"	Rich Ward	3:37
10.	"No Good Way"	Johnny Andrews, Rich Ward	3:46
11.	"SOS" (ABBA cover)	Björn Ulvaeus, Benny Andersson, Stig Anderson	3:17
12.	"Witchery"		4:50
Total length:			45:18

== Charts ==
Chart (2014)	Peak position
US Billboard 200	54
US Hard Rock Albums	9
US Independent Albums	12
US Rock Albums	20

== Personnel ==
=== Musicians ===
- Chris Jericho – lead vocals
- Rich Ward – guitar, backing vocals
- Paul Di Leo – bass
- Frank Fontsere – drums
- Billy Grey – guitar

Additional musicians

- Michael Starr – additional vocals on "Tonight"
- Christie Cook – co-lead vocals on "Unstoppable"
