= Sin and Bones =

Studio album by Fozzy
- Released: August 14, 2012
- Genre: Heavy metal, hard rock
- Length: 50:25
- Label: Century Media Records
- Producer: Rich Ward

Fozzy chronology
Chasing the Grail (2010)	Sin and Bones (2012)	Do You Wanna Start a War (2014)

Singles from Sin and Bones
- 1. "Sandpaper" Released: July 17, 2012

Professional ratings
Review scores
Source	Rating
Metalholic	9.1/10 stars
AllMusic	3.5/5 stars

Sin and Bones is the fifth album, and third album of all original material, from American heavy metal band Fozzy. It was released on August 14, 2012, through Century Media Records.

== Background ==
Lead singer Chris Jericho commented on the album "It's the typical cliché, but Sin and Bones really is the best thing we've ever done. We've taken the heavy yet ultra-melodic style that has become Fozzy's trademark to the next level and I guarantee these songs will blow all of you away!" At the pre-show to the Metal Hammer Awards on June 11, Fozzy performed a new song set to be on the album called "Sandpaper". During an interview at the 2012 Download Festival, Jericho also stated that the band wanted to make Sin and Bones their "Black Album" in reference to Metallica's critically acclaimed self-titled album that sent them into the mainstream.

== Reception ==
Sin and Bones premiered at number 1 on the Billboard Heatseekers chart and marks the band's best-selling first week ever for an album of entirely original material. Released on August 14, the album also celebrates the band's first appearance on the Billboard Top 200 chart, where it landed at number 143. Ultimate Guitar declared Fozzy as "one of the best metal bands out there right now", Revolver called Sin and Bones "Fozzy's best album yet", and Metal Hammer UK said, "Sin and Bones is impressive, diverse and mature... this is a masterclass that should take Fozzy on to bigger things".

== Track listing ==
All tracks are written by Rich Ward and Chris Jericho, except where noted.

No.	Title	Writer(s)	Length
1.	"Spider in My Mouth"		4:47
2.	"Sandpaper" (featuring M. Shadows)		3:12
3.	"Blood Happens"		4:07
4.	"Inside My Head"	Ward, Jericho, Billy Grey	4:02
5.	"Sin and Bones"		3:36
6.	"A Passed Life"		6:55
7.	"She's My Addiction" (featuring Phil Campbell)		3:22
8.	"Shine Forever"		5:45
9.	"Dark Passenger"	Ward, Jericho, Grey, Terry Chism	4:23
10.	"Storm the Beaches"	Ward, Jericho, Grey, Chism	11:35
Total length:			50:25

Bonus tracks
No.	Title	Writer(s)	Length
11.	"Walk Amongst the Dead"		4:24
12.	"Fairies Wear Boots" (Black Sabbath cover)	Tony Iommi, Bill Ward, Geezer Butler, Ozzy Osbourne	6:18

== Charts ==
Chart (2012)	Peak position
US Billboard 200	143
US Hard Rock Albums	13
US Heatseeker Albums	1
US Independent Albums	25
US Rock Albums	47

== Personnel ==
=== Musicians ===
- Chris Jericho – lead vocals
- Rich Ward – guitar, backing vocals, engineering
- Paul Di Leo – bass
- Frank Fontsere – drums
- Billy Grey – guitar

=== Additional musicians ===
- M. Shadows – additional vocals on "Sandpaper"
- Phil Campbell – guitar solo on "She's My Addiction"
- Terry Chism - keyboards, orchestral arrangement, backing vocals, vocal arrangement
- Neil Tankersley - Hammond organ, electric piano
- Amanda Aborn - female vocals on "Spider in my Mouth"
- Ed Aborn - backing vocals
- Nick Parsons - backing vocals
- Christina Starr Wherry - backing vocals

=== Other credits ===
- Todd Campbell - tracking of guitar solo on "She's My Addiction"
- Anthony Clarkson - artwork, layout
- Drew Crozier - photography
- Shawn Grove - mixing
- Glenn Schick - mastering
- Miguel Scott - drums engineering
