= Riot Entertainment =

Australian independent record label

Riot!
- Founder: John Howarth
- Distributor: Warner
- Genre: Heavy metal, Hard rock
- Country of origin: Australia
- Location: Wollongong, Australia
- Official website: Riot Entertainment

Riot! Entertainment is an independent record label, music distribution service and tour promoter based in Wollongong, Australia. According to their website, Riot is Australia's biggest heavy metal music distribution company. The company serves as the Australian distributor for Nuclear Blast, Metal Blade, Relapse, Season of Mist, Victory Records, Peaceville Records, Good Fight Records and several others. Riot is also a record label with a roster that currently includes Hellyeah, Black Label Society, Ace Frehley, Stuck Mojo, Mortal Sin, The Poor, LORD, and Voyager among others.

== Current roster ==
^{* denotes Australia/New Zealand distribution only}

- Hellyeah*
- Black Label Society*
- Ace Frehley*
- Stuck Mojo
- Yngwie Malmsteen*
- Free Reign
- Annihilator*
- The Poor
- Mortal Sin
- Melody Black
- Voyager
- LORD
- Vanishing Point
- Universum
- Ink
- Skintilla*
- Our Last Enemy*

== Former artists ==
- Fozzy
- Buried in Verona
- Five Star Prison Cell
- Aiden
- The Berzerker
- Black Asylum
