= Frank Fontsere =

American drummer

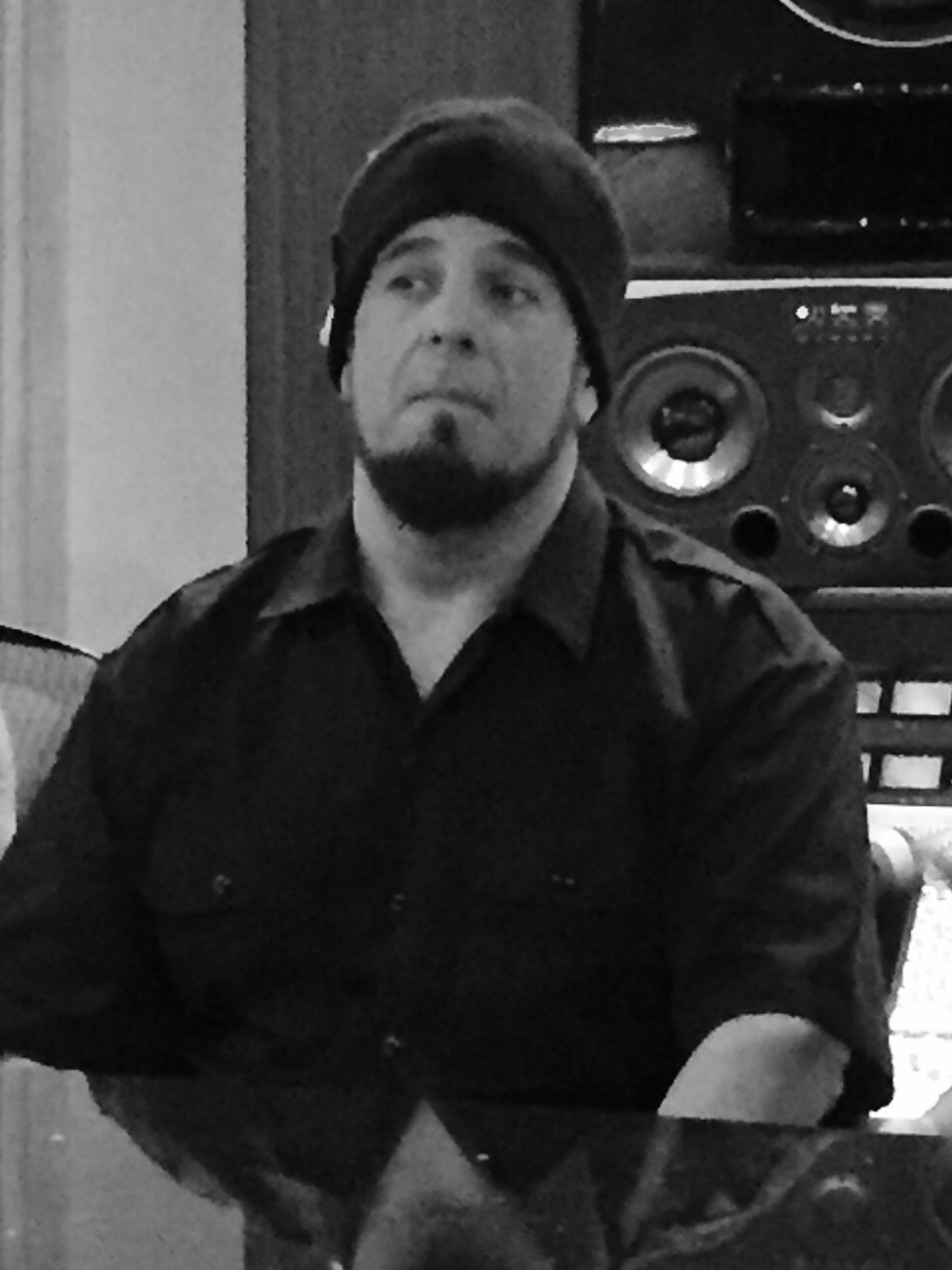
- Fontsere with Stuck Mojo in 2016

Background information
- Also known as: KK LaFlame
- Born: September 2, 1967 (age 58); Denville, New Jersey, U.S.
- Genres: Heavy metal, rap metal, nu metal, hard rock
- Occupation: Drummer
- Years active: 1996–2022

Frank Fontsere (born September 2, 1967) is an American drummer from Marietta, Georgia. He is known mostly for his work in rap metal group Stuck Mojo (1996–2000) and heavy metal group Fozzy (1999–2005, 2009–2022). He has also been a member of Agent Cooper (2004, 2005), The Duke (2005), Soundevice (2006), Love Said No (2007) and Primer 55 (2007). He is known for using drum triggers on his albums and for every live performance.

== Discography ==
Stuck Mojo

- Violated EP (European release) (1996)
- Pigwalk (1996)
- Rising (1998)
- HVY1 (1999)
- Declaration of a Headhunter (2000)
- Violate This (2001)
- Here Come the Infidels (2016)

Fozzy

- Fozzy (2000)
- Happenstance (2002)
- WWE Originals (2004)
- All That Remains (2005)
- Chasing the Grail (2010)
- Sin and Bones (2012)
- Do You Wanna Start a War (2014)
- Judas (2017)

Agent Cooper

- Beginner's Mind (2004)

The Duke

- The Duke – My Kung-Fu Is Good (2005)

Love Said No

- Love Said No EP (2007)
