= Fozzy =

American rock band

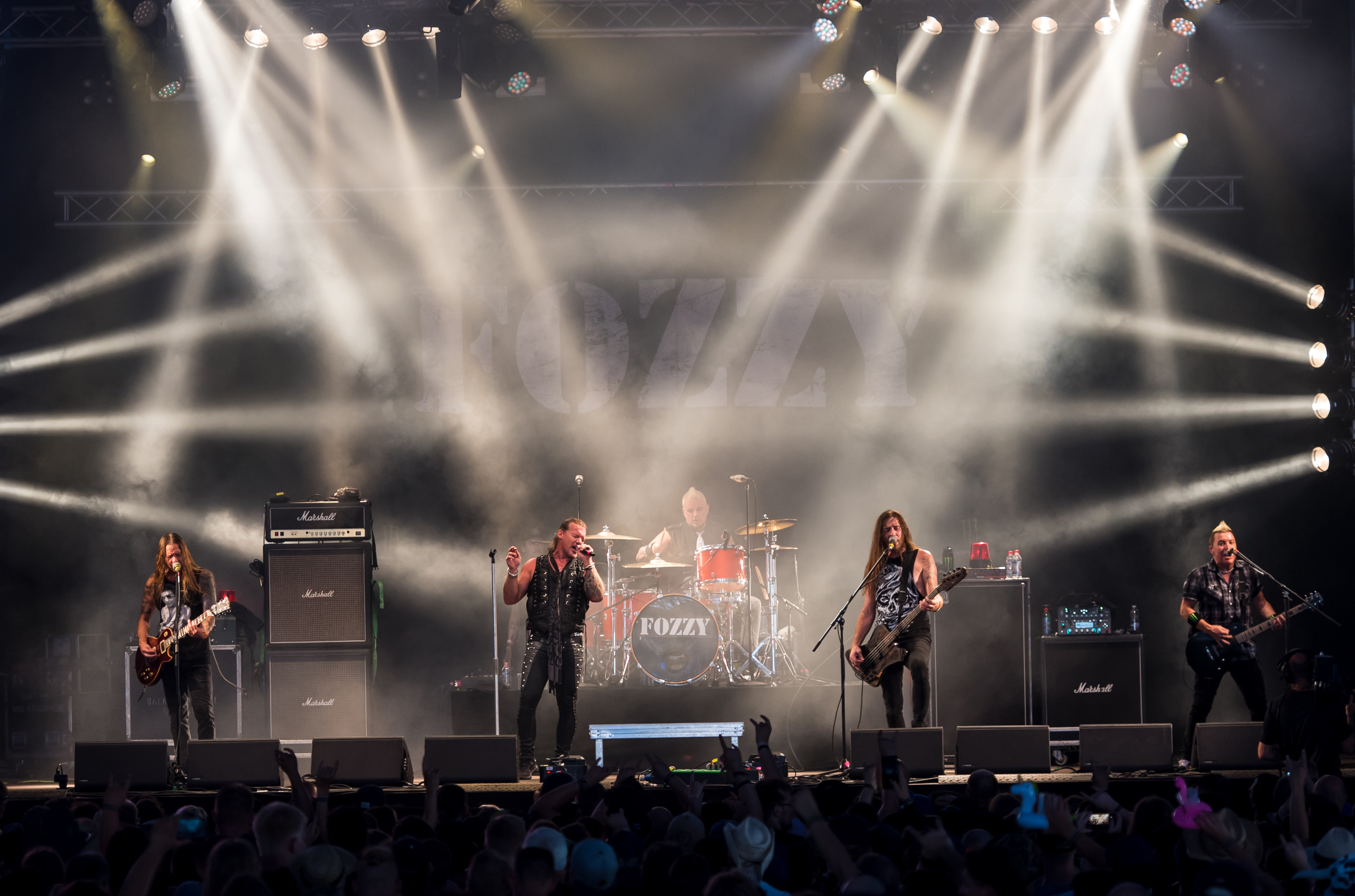
- Fozzy performing at Wacken Open Air 2018

Background information
- Also known as: Fozzy Osbourne
- Origin: Atlanta, Georgia, U.S.
- Genres: Heavy metal; hard rock
- Years active: 1999–present (Hiatus: 2006–2010)
- Labels: Megaforce; Palm; Ash; Riot! Entertainment; Century Media; Sony Music
- Members: Chris Jericho; Rich "The Duke" Ward; Billy Grey; P. J. Farley; Grant Brooks
- Past members: Paul Di Leo; Jeff Rouse; Frank Fontsere; Mike Martin; Sean Delson; Eric Sanders; Ryan Mallam; Dan Dryden; Randy Drake; Keith Watson
- Website: fozzyrock.com

Fozzy is an American heavy metal band formed in Atlanta, Georgia, in 1999 by lead guitarist Rich Ward and drummer Frank Fontsere. The band's current lineup consists of vocalist Chris Jericho, Ward, second guitarist Billy Grey, bassist P. J. Farley and drummer Grant Brooks. Jericho has characterized the band by saying, "If Metallica and Journey had a bastard child, it would be Fozzy." As of September 2022, the band has released eight studio albums and one live album. Their first two albums consist of primarily cover songs with some original material, while their albums since have made original material the primary focus.

== History ==
=== Formation (1999–2000) ===
Fozzy started as Fozzy Osbourne, a play on the name of the singer Ozzy Osbourne, and was a cover band assembled by Ward from whatever musicians he could find in a given week. In 1999, Jericho and Ward met in San Antonio, Texas, after a wrestling show and Jericho was invited to play with the band. Their first show was held at the now-defunct club "The Hangar", in the downtown square of Marietta, Georgia. Jericho sat in on a few sessions, but did not plan to play with them permanently. In 2000, Jericho rejoined the band and became its frontman under the persona of Moongoose McQueen, and the band went on tour. As part of the band's "gimmick", Jericho refused to acknowledge that Moongoose McQueen and Chris Jericho were the same person. When interviewed as Moongoose, he would stay in character the whole time and even feign ignorance of who Chris Jericho was. On the other side, Chris Jericho was a "huge fan" of Moongoose and Fozzy.

Fozzy logo wordmark

=== Fozzy and Happenstance (2000–2002) ===
The band shortened its name to Fozzy, and adopted the satirical back-story that they had signed with a record company to move to Japan to be huge rock stars, but the company went out of business, leaving them stranded for 20 years, while all their demos were snatched and recorded by other bands. Soon afterward, Fozzy produced their first album, Fozzy, featuring mostly covers of bands such as Dio, Krokus, Twisted Sister, Iron Maiden, Mötley Crüe and Judas Priest. Also, at one time the band considered changing their name to Big City Knights. The album charted at number 27 on the US Heatseekers Chart and 32 on the Independent Albums Chart.

Fozzy's second album, Happenstance, was produced in 2002, again with mostly covers of bands such as Black Sabbath, Scorpions, W.A.S.P. and Accept. The album charted slightly lower than the debut on both the HeatSeekers and Independent Charts peaking at number 32 and 34 respectively.

=== All That Remains (2003–2006) ===
"Enemy" by Fozzy (2005)
21 second sample from Fozzy's "Enemy".

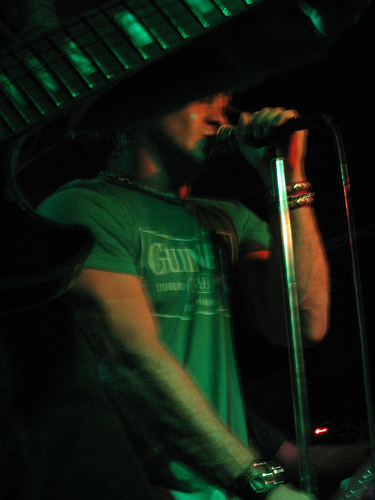
Chris Jericho performing with Fozzy in 2005

After the Happenstance tour ended in 2003, the band dropped its back-story and Chris Jericho's McQueen persona in the mockumentary Unleashed, Uncensored, Unknown. In January 2005, they released their third album, All That Remains, which had entirely original tracks, including the singles "Enemy", "It's a Lie", "Born of Anger", and "The Test". All That Remains included guest appearances by musicians Zakk Wylde (Black Label Society, Ozzy Osbourne, Pride & Glory), Bone Crusher, Mark Tremonti (Creed, Alter Bridge), Myles Kennedy (Alter Bridge, Slash), Marty Friedman (Megadeth) and Butch Walker (Marvelous 3). The album sold over 100,000 copies. in 2005, "Enemy" was the theme song for WWE No Way Out and in 2006 for a promotional video for TNA Bound for Glory. Greg Prato of AllMusic gave the album and the band praise in his review stating “There's no denying that the group has grown into a powerful metal band in the style of Black Label Society, with extra added elements of '80s-era heavy metal. Once more, in addition to all the brawn, Jericho proves to be a very capable (and powerful) metal singer, as evidenced by the Pantera-esque album opener, "Nameless Faceless." But probably most impressive of all is the guitar work.”

Due to the success of the album, the band embarked on a world tour between February 2005 to February 2006, where they went made stops in Europe, Canada, Australia and America. The band also got to play three times at the Astoria, one of the most prestigious venues in London, selling out the venue on all three nights. The band also took part of the 2005 Download Festival at Donington Park where they performed in front of 20,000 people and were met with positive reviews with Kerrang! magazine calling them "the surprise hit of the day". Their time in England was highlighted in their All That Remains: Reloaded DVD "Live in the UK".

=== Chasing the Grail (2009–2011) ===
Soon after the release of All That Remains, a fourth album was announced.

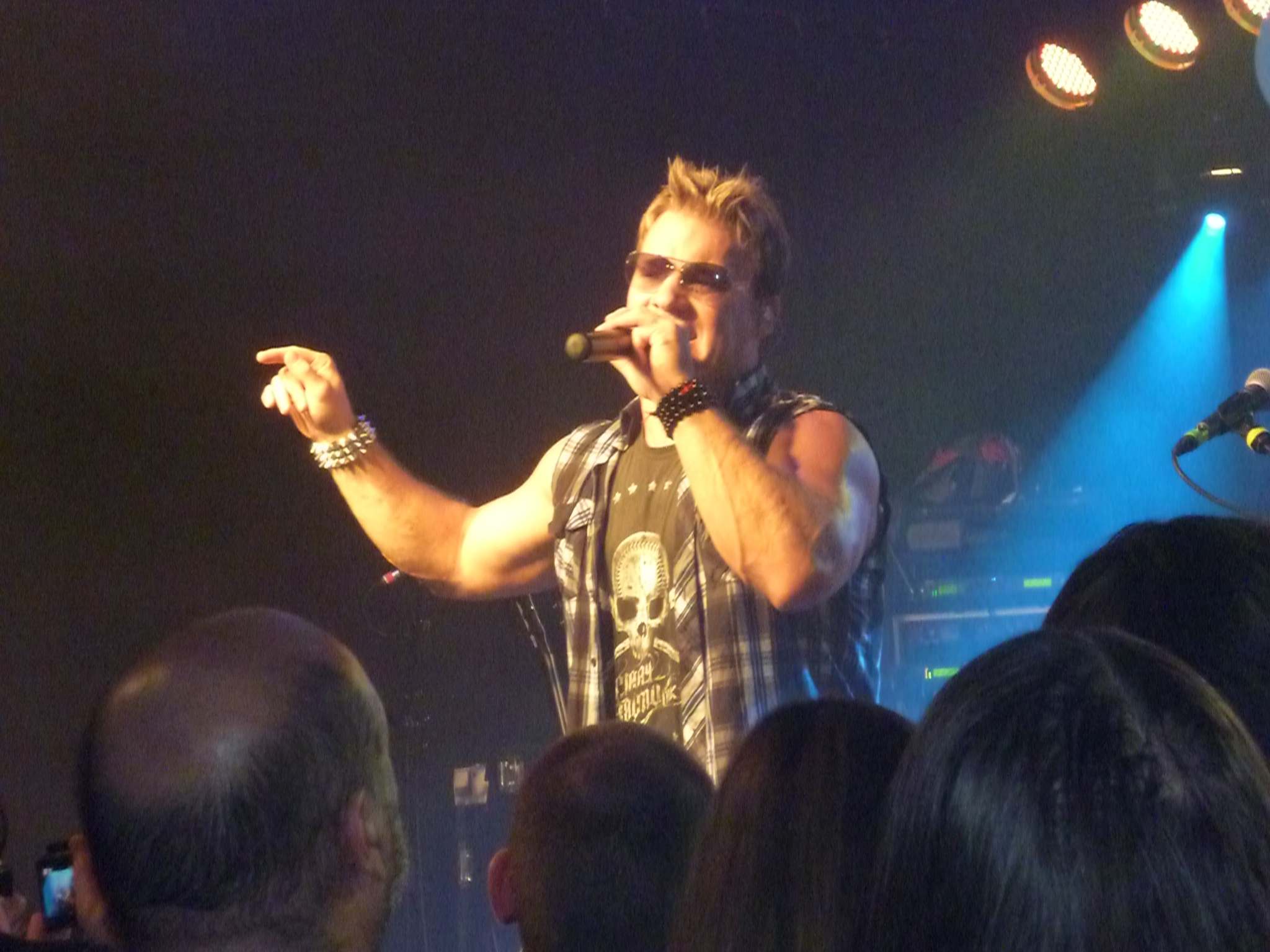
Chris Jericho live with Fozzy at the Kleine Klub (Saarbrücken)

On March 4, 2009, MetalUnderground.com reported that Fozzy had signed a worldwide record deal with Australian-based Riot! Entertainment to release their fourth album, Chasing the Grail. The album's lead single, "Martyr No More", was announced as an official theme song for the WWE Royal Rumble pay per view. The album was released in America on January 26, 2010, followed by Australia (February) and Europe (March). It debuted at number 6 on US Heatseekers Charts.

On February 19, 2011, Jericho said during an interview with Active Rock radio station WBSX in Wilkes-Barre, Pennsylvania, that he had completed lyrics for a brand new Fozzy album and that Ward was beginning work on writing the music. The band hoped to have the new album released in February 2012. The band then went on one more UK tour in late 2011 in support of their previous album before starting the recording process. According to Fozzy's official Facebook page, the recordings were done on May 4, 2012. Fozzy released a brand new music video on June 7, which was shot at the Golden Gods Awards for the track "God Pounds His Nails". On July 10, Fozzy played the Sonisphere Festival at Knebworth, England. A special, two-CD edition of Fozzy's live album Remains Alive was released with Chasing the Grail on July 18.

On September 9, Sean Delson announced his "retirement" from Fozzy as their bass guitar player to resume work with Agent Cooper. Fozzy announced Paul Di Leo, the bass guitarist for Adrenaline Mob, as his replacement.

=== Sin and Bones (2012–2013) ===
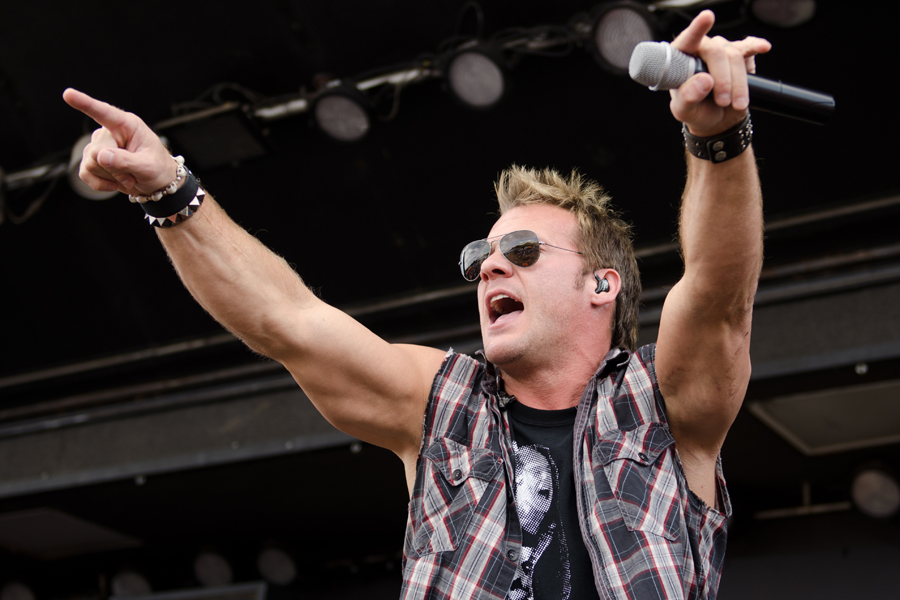
Chris Jericho performing with Fozzy at Uproar Festival in Atlanta 2012

On January 18, 2010, it was announced that Fozzy had signed with Century Media Records, and planned to release a new album later in the year. Jericho hinted the new album on his Twitter page, saying, 'New @FOZZYROCK album in August?!'. Jericho then made a full-time return to the WWE on January 4, but despite this, Fozzy was announced to be a part of the Download Festival in the UK, in the summer. On July 17, Fozzy released the first single from their fifth studio album, Sin and Bones, titled "Sandpaper". The song features guest vocals by M. Shadows from Avenged Sevenfold and was also the Hell in a Cell theme song. Sin and Bones was released on August 14. The album became the band’s first to reach the Billboard 200 peaking at number 143, it also reached number 1 on the Heatseekers Chart. following the albums release Ultimate Guitar declared Fozzy as "one of the best metal bands out there right now," Metal Hammer UK said, "Sin and Bones is impressive, diverse and mature... this is a masterclass that should take Fozzy on to bigger things". Shortly after the album's release, Chris Jericho once again left the WWE with his final appearance being on SmackDown, on August 20, so that he could go on tour with the band. Fozzy played on the 2012 Uproar Festival tour, headlining the Jägermeister stage. After the Uproar Festival, Fozzy scheduled an international tour with stops in Europe and Australia. Fozzy made their return to the U.S. in 2013 touring as an opener for Saxon on the "Sacrifice and Sin" tour. One tour date (September 21, Joilet, Illinois) was rescheduled and became a Fozzy solo date on October 16.

=== Do You Wanna Start a War (2014–2015) ===
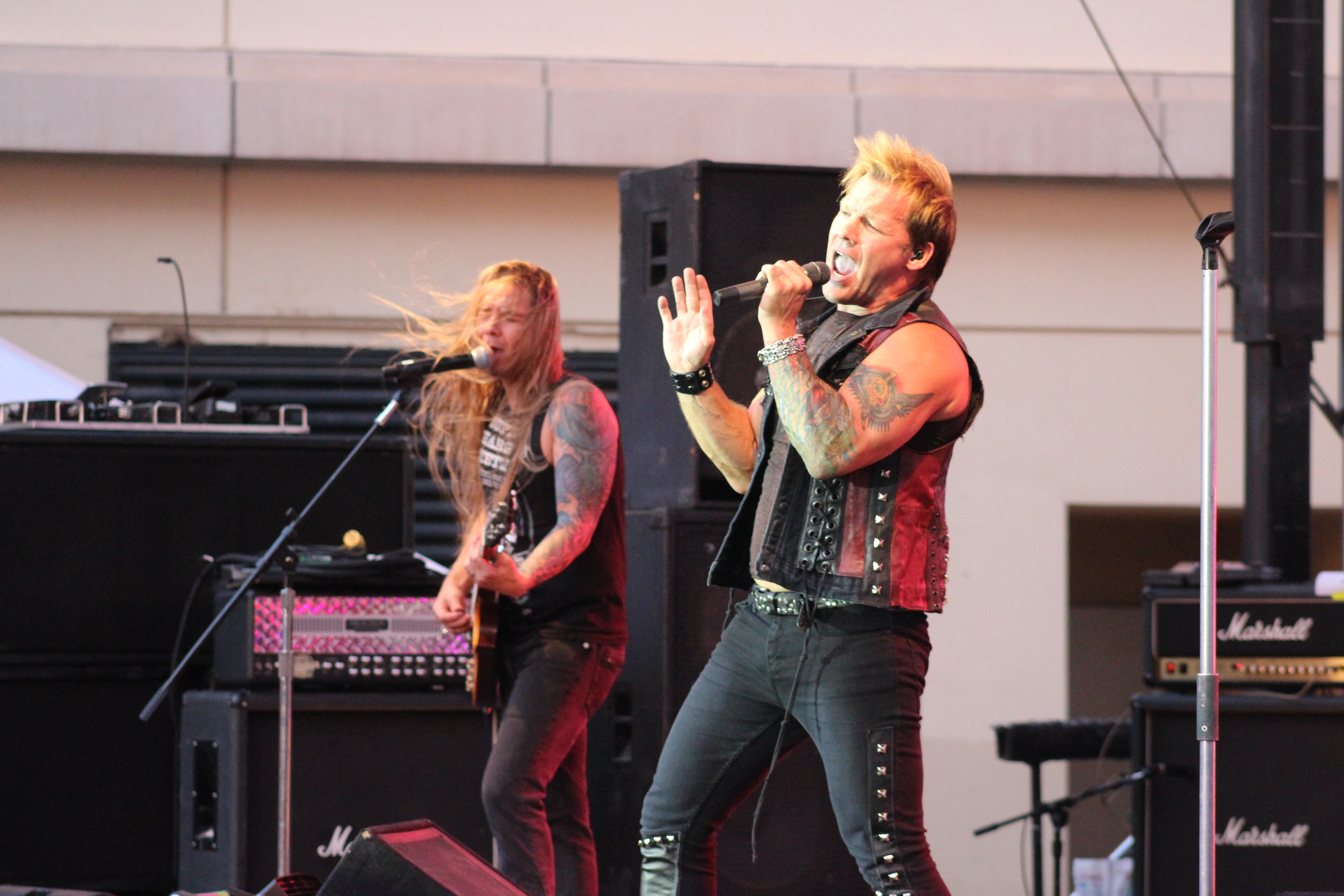
Fozzy performing at the El Paso Downtown Street Festival in 2014

During 2013, it was confirmed that Fozzy would begin working on a new record in 2014 and would be looking for a release date during the summer of 2014. The band entered the studio in late January. The first single, "Lights Go Out", was released April 29. "Lights Go Out" reached number 29 on the Billboard Mainstream Rock Songs chart, becoming their first single to make it to the charts. Following the release of the new single, the band embarked on the "Lights Go Out" tour to promote their new album, playing festivals such as Carolina Rebellion, Rock on the Range, and Download, where they performed on the main stage for the first time in the band's history. The second single, "One Crazed Anarchist", was released on May 26, 2014, and was given away to people that pre-ordered the album. The album, Do You Wanna Start a War, was released on July 21 in the UK and Europe and July 22 in North America. The album became their highest charting album to date on the Billboard 200 debuting at number 54, while also peaking a number 9 on the US Hard Rock Charts selling about 5,600 copies in its first week. The album also features guest appearances by Christie Cook and Steel Panther's Michael Starr. In September 2014, the band announced that Jeff Rouse would be their new bassist, as Paul Di Leo mutually parted ways with the band in May. They then embarked on the CinderBlockParty World Tour.

=== Judas (2016–2018) ===
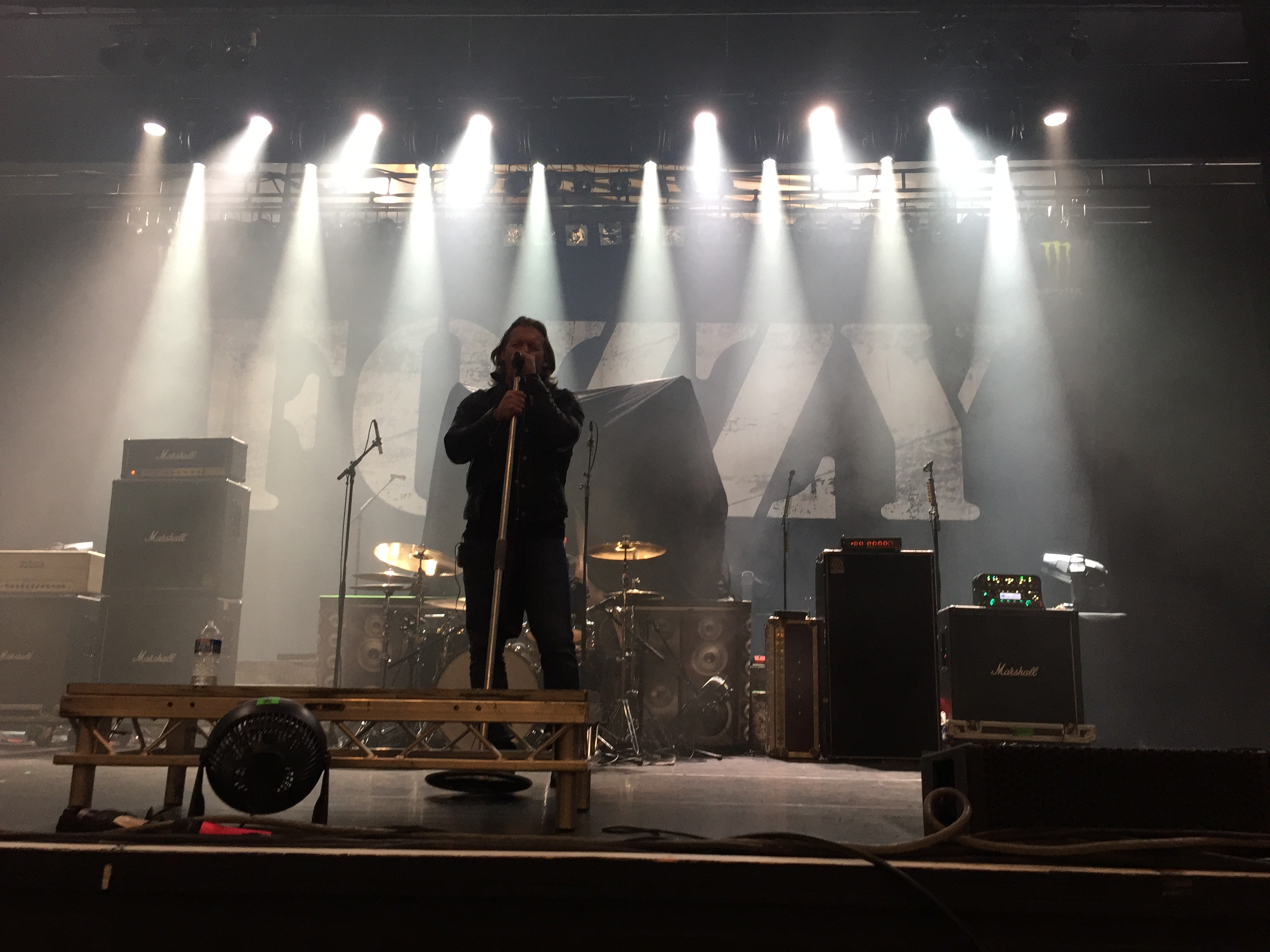
Fozzy performing in 2018

Jericho confirmed that Fozzy hoped to have their seventh studio album written by January 2016. As of December 2015, the band had started working on the record and hoped to have a release date sometime in summer 2016. However, Jericho said in an interview that it was unlikely to be released in 2016 and was more likely to be released in 2017; this could be due to his return as a full-time WWE in-ring competitor.

On March 18, 2017, Jericho announced that Paul Di Leo had rejoined Fozzy on his Instagram page, replacing Randy Drake as the bassist.

On April 26, 2017, the band released a short snippet of their new single and music video titled "Judas", which premiered on Loudwire on May 2. "Judas" would later become one of the official theme songs for WWE's NXT TakeOver: Chicago, as well as Jericho's theme song in New Japan Pro-Wrestling and All Elite Wrestling. "Judas" instantly became a hit for the band, receiving over 30 million views on YouTube, and reaching number one on various charts worldwide, including reaching number 5 on the Billboard Mainstream Rock Songs, their highest charting position for a single. The band embarked on a show tour in May–June 2017 alongside Kyng and Sons of Texas.

Guitarist Rich Ward revealed in an interview with Blabbermouth that the album would be released in September 2017 and is also titled Judas. The album release date was revealed on Jericho's official Instagram account: Judas was released on October 13, 2017. The album debuted at 147 on the Billboard 200 and 7 on the US Hard Rock Charts. The album was often considered one of the band's strongest and most consistently enjoyable albums, though some reviewers pointed out a few forgettable tracks and felt the band held back at times.

After extensive touring through 2017 - 2018, Paul Di Leo would again part ways and again be replaced with Randy Drake for the remainder of the 2018 Judas tour, including Fozzy playing at Jericho's Rock'N'Wrestling Rager at Sea. On October 22, 2017, Fozzy played at the Aftershock Festival in Sacramento, California.

=== Boombox (2019–present) ===
On April 4, 2019, Fozzy announced that they were signing with Sony Music. Following this, they announced they had entered the studio to begin recording of their eighth studio album, later tentatively named as 2020 due for release in 2020. Chris Jericho debuted the album's first single, "Nowhere to Run" during a broadcast of The Rock of Jericho on August 23. "Nowhere to Run" was later released on August 29, 2019. However, in July 2020, Chris Jericho said the album's title had been scrapped, and the release was pushed to 2021. "The original idea was to call it '2020', until we realized that we're not gonna have this thing done till November/December, so it's not as contemporary anymore to put out an album called '2020' when it's 2021. Let's just leave it behind." The album, re-titled Boombox, was released on May 6, 2022. In the spring of 2022, Fozzy embarked on an extensive American tour titled the "Save the World Tour". In 2023 the band embarked on the second save the world tour along with another tour in November supported by Seventh Day Slumber, The Nocturnal Affair, and Magdalene Rose.

On August 27, 2023, the band played their song “Judas” for Chris Jericho's entrance in front of 80,000 people at AEW's All In: London. October 19, 2023 the band released a single titled “Spotlight” which reached number 1 on the US Secondary Market Rock Chart. The band played their song “Judas” live once again for Jerichos entrance at All In: London 2024.

In late 2024 Jericho announced the band would be touring in celebration of Fozzy’s 25th anniversary, this tour has extended all the way into mid 2025. In April of 2025 Fozzy released a new single called “Fall in Line” with a music video being released shortly after. On September 12, the band released a cover of “Crazy Train” in tribute to Ozzy Osbourne, they then performed the cover live while opening for Alice Cooper and Judas Priest. In February of 2026 Fozzy embarked on a U.K. tour. Rich Ward also stated in an interview with The Ray Rocks that the band will be focusing on releasing songs one at a time for the foreseeable future instead of releasing a full album.

== Musical style ==
Fozzy is usually described as a heavy metal/hard rock band. Chris Jericho serves as one of the bands songwriters, some of their lyrical themes touch upon relationships, personal struggle, self-belief and anthems. Jericho has also stated he often starts with a song title rather than a complete theme “I have a list of song titles when it’s time to write lyrics” “I’ll go back and look through what I have.” Additionally longtime guitarist Rich Ward is one of the group’s main songwriters and stated in an 2022 interview "I feel like a Fozzy record is not right unless it lives in both words where it's got these big superhooks and at the same time has the big riffs."

In a 2017 interview with Blabbermouth.net Jericho described Fozzy as:

“If Metallica and Journey had a bastard child, it would be Fozzy… Now I’m going to change it for this record: ‘If Metallica and Journey had a bastard child and it was raised by AC/DC, then you would really know what Fozzy sounds like.’”

Some of Fozzy’s influences include Iron Maiden, Metallica, Black Sabbath and Ozzy, Pantera, Foreigner, Styx, Journey and Queen.

== Members ==
Current members

- Chris Irvine (aka Chris Jericho) – lead vocals (1999–present)
- Rich Ward – lead guitar, keyboards, programming, backing and occasional lead vocals (1999–present)
- Billy Grey – rhythm guitar, backing vocals (2010–present; touring 2002)
- P. J. Farley – bass, backing vocals (2020–present)
- Grant Brooks – drums (2022–present)

== Discography ==
Studio albums

- Fozzy (2000)
- Happenstance (2002)
- All That Remains (2005)
- Chasing the Grail (2010)
- Sin and Bones (2012)
- Do You Wanna Start a War (2014)
- Judas (2017)
- Boombox (2022)

== Awards ==
Loudwire Music Awards

Year (Note: The listed year refers to the date of the ceremony.)	Work	Award	Result	Ref.
2012	Sandpaper (featuring M. Shadows)	Cage Match Hall of Fame	Won	
2017	Judas	Hard Rock Song of the Year	Nominated	

Revolver Magazine

Year	Work	Award	Result	Ref.
2011	Chris Jericho	Revolver Magazine's 100 Greatest Living Rock Stars	Won	
