= Rich Ward =

American guitarist

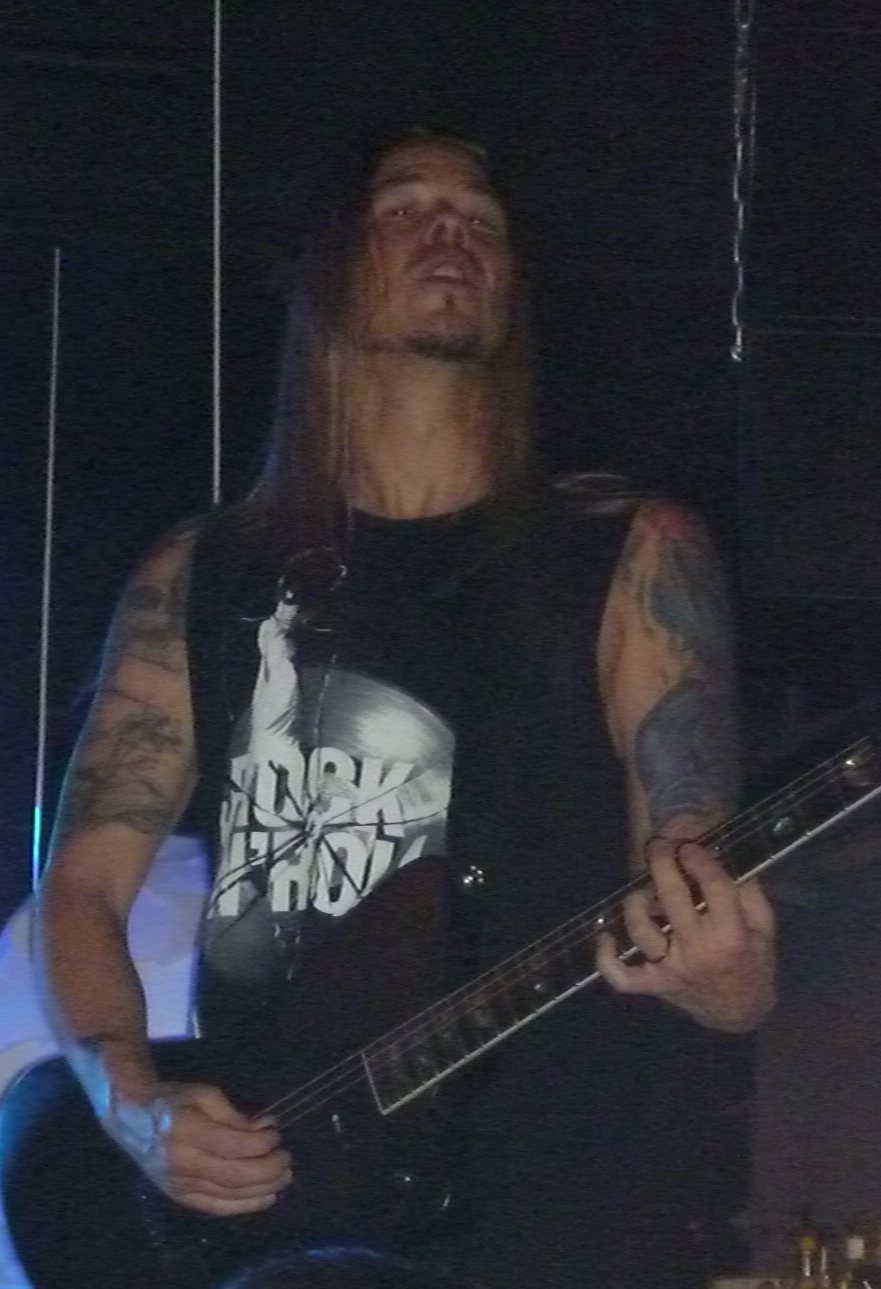
- Ward performing in 2011

Background information
- Also known as: The Duke; Duke LaRüe
- Born: Richard Park Ward; January 16, 1969 (age 57); Charlotte, North Carolina, U.S.
- Genres: Hard rock; heavy metal; rap metal
- Occupation: Musician
- Instruments: Guitar, vocals
- Years active: 1989–present
- Member of: Stuck Mojo; Fozzy; Guardians of the Jukebox
- Formerly of: Sick Speed; Adrenaline Mob
- Website: thedukeofmetal.com

Richard Park Ward (born January 16, 1969), also known by his stage name the Duke, is an American guitarist and occasional vocalist. He is a founding member of rap metal band Stuck Mojo and the lead guitarist of heavy metal band Fozzy.

== Early life ==
Ward grew up listening to many indie-style soundtracks as that was all that was available to him. After his parents' divorce, Ward's mother's work schedule was hectic, resulting in her hiring a college student to look after him and his sister.

According to Ward, the student would often bring over heavy metal and hard rock albums from bands such as AC/DC, Black Sabbath and Iron Maiden, to name a few. From that point, Ward had a new outlook on music, having found the genre of music that "clicked" with him. Ward has also said in interviews that his favorite band growing up was Journey, and he has also cited bands like Bad Company and Foreigner as influences.

Ward began learning guitar at age 12, borrowing a friend's guitar on weekends, practicing different chords he picked up from his friends.

== Career ==
=== Early career ===
In 1989, Ward formed Stuck Mojo along with bassist Duane Fowler and front man Bonz. The first six years of the band consisted of touring clubs on the East Coast of the United States. When recalling this time of his life, Ward speaks of sleeping in his rehearsal space to save money.

After finally receiving a recording contract with Century Media Records, Mojo released its debut album Snappin' Necks in 1995. Although the album found little mainstream success, it went on to influence many popular nu metal bands of today, such as Linkin Park and Limp Bizkit. In 1996, in preparation for their first overseas tour, the band released the European-only EP, Violated. That same year, Stuck Mojo released its second album, Pigwalk. Even though the band's second full-length album sold in similar numbers as the previous one, many critics and musicians consider this album to be a defining milestone of rap-metal. In 1998, Stuck Mojo released Rising, its commercially most successful release.

From its beginnings, the band went through a number of lineup changes. As time went on, tensions within the group mounted, primarily between Ward and Bonz. Ward has stated in interviews that it once escalated to the point of a physical confrontation between the two while on tour in Europe. At one point, they were not even talking to each other, only having one common goal, the success of the band.

In 2000, Stuck Mojo released Declaration of a Headhunter. The band had slowly been crumbling during the process of recording and releasing the album. Ward recalled, "That album was basically done with duct tape, we didn't even have a working band." The bands' relationship with Century Media, both mutual and business, had also been deteriorating, to the point where Ward disbanded the band a while after releasing the album.

=== Post-Stuck Mojo ===
In 1999, Ward formed Sick Speed with singer and guitarist Dale Steele, Mojo bassist Dan Dryden and Mojo drummer Frank "Bud" Fontsere. The same year, Ward met World Wrestling Entertainment (then known as the World Wrestling Federation, or WWF) superstar Chris Jericho backstage at a WWF show. The two bonded over their love of 1980s heavy metal and Ward invited Jericho to join his side band Fozzy Osbourne which would later transform into the "mock rock" band Fozzy. While the band was originally supposed to be just a fun side project, the band was courted by Metal Blade Records and filmed a "mockumentary" that aired on MTV. The show provided a fictional back story about the band, alleging that the members of Fozzy had in fact written many of the more popular 1980s metal songs, but that an unfair contract had forced the band to remain in Japan for the past 20 years, allowing other acts to take credit for the compositions.

Fozzy's first two albums, Fozzy and Happenstance mainly consisted of covers of the songs of 1970s and 1980s metal bands. Their third album, All That Remains, consisted entirely of originals, although two of the songs, "The Test" and "The Way I Am", had been written by Ward during his time with Sick Speed, which disbanded in 2004. The reason for releasing a completely original album was noted by Ward, "Ultimately it came to the time of the third album that we had to decide what we are, we're either a joke or we're a really good joke with good songs".

In early 2005, performing under the stage name "the Duke", Ward released My Kung Fu is Good, his debut solo album with Spitfire Records, which grew from demos he had recorded the previous year and performances at the Atlantis Music Conference in Atlanta, Georgia.

The album received positive reviews, with Billboard magazine stating, "Evolution and growth that exceeds most of the rock acts currently cluttering the airwaves."

In 2011, he joined metal supergroup Adrenaline Mob playing rhythm guitar, but he left in early 2012 to focus on other projects.

=== Stuck Mojo reunion ===
Ward reformed Stuck Mojo with Bonz and Fontsere in 2005, alongside new bassist Sean Delson. Ward stated that he and Bonz had patched things up over recent years and regained the desire to want to write and release records. Mojo started a tour of Europe and then of the U.S. However, the reunion with Bonz only lasted into early 2006, when the band approached Bonz with an ultimatum; either enter a substance abuse rehabilitation program or he would be forced to leave the group. Substance abuse is attributed to the previously damaged relationship between Ward and Bonz, who often mentioned marijuana in the band's live shows.

Bonz responded with a compromise that he would work on the addiction himself. Ward cited this as too big a risk, fueled by the then-recent deaths of other musicians in metal bands. Bonz left the band and was replaced by his friend, Lord Nelson.

Stuck Mojo today is known most for their 2006 song "Open Season", which sparked controversy in the American media in general.

"Open Season" is part of the album that Bonz and Ward had originally collaborated on in the reformation of Stuck Mojo, Southern Born Killers. Due to Bonz' sudden departure from the band, Ward re-recorded the album with vocalist Lord Nelson, guitarist Mike Martin, bassist Sean Delson and drummer Eric Sanders (Frank Fontsere departed in December 2005). In early 2008, Stuck Mojo signed with Napalm Records and re-released Southern Born Killers along with three new tracks. The album was released internationally on February 29, 2008, and on March 4, 2008, in the U.S.

In late 2008, the band released "The Great Revival" overseas, and in the United States, it was released on January 13, 2009. Some critics disliked the direction of the album, and reviews were mixed.

In 2015, Ward stated on his website that he had begun writing demos for a new Stuck Mojo release. In March 2016, Stuck Mojo announced the release of their seventh studio album, Here Come the Infidels, via PledgeMusic.com. Along with the new album, Stuck Mojo announced the band's new lineup of Ward, Frank Fontsere, and new members Robby J. and Len Sonnier.

== Personal life ==
Ward was previously married to professional wrestler Daffney. He has since remarried and he and his wife Julie live in the Atlanta area.

== Discography ==
=== Stuck Mojo ===
- Snappin' Necks (1995)
- Violated (EP, 1996)
- Pigwalk (1996)
- Rising (1998)
- HVY1 (1999)
- Declaration of a Headhunter (2000)
- Violate This (2001)
- Southern Born Killers (2007)
- The Great Revival (2008)
- Here Come the Infidels (2016)

=== Sick Speed ===
- The Way I Am (2002)

=== Fozzy ===
- Fozzy (2000)
- Happenstance (2002)
- All That Remains (2005)
- Chasing the Grail (2010)
- Remains Alive (2011)
- Sin and Bones (2012)
- Do You Wanna Start a War (2014)
- Judas (2017)
- Boombox (2022)

=== Solo ===
- My Kung Fu Is Good (2005)

=== Guest appearance ===
- Kickdown – "My Anthem" (on the album Kawoom) (2004)
- Folder – "It's Tricky" & "Drastic" (with Bonz on the album Keep the Flow, also does the intro for the record)
- Sandfrog – "Face Down"
