= Nonpoint discography =

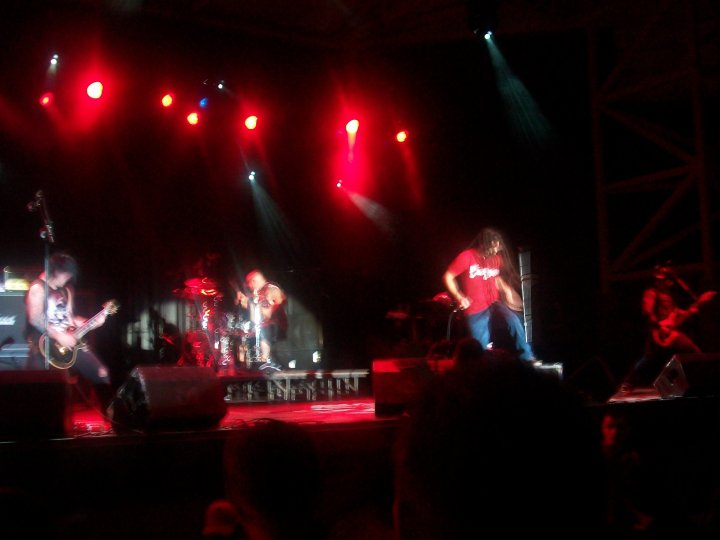
Nonpoint performing in 2010

This is a list of albums and singles for American nu metal band Nonpoint.

== Albums ==
=== Studio albums ===
List of studio albums, with selected chart positions
Title	Album details	Peak chart positions								Sales
Title	Album details	US	US Alt.	US Dig.	US Hard	US Heat.	US Ind.	US Rock	US Sale.	Sales
Statement	Released: October 10, 2000; Label: MCA; Formats: CD, CS	166	—	—	—	10	—	—	—	US: 192,338+
Development	Released: June 25, 2002; Label: MCA; Formats: CD, CS	52	—	—	—	—	—	—	—	US: 72,657+
Recoil	Released: August 3, 2004; Label: Lava; Formats: CD	115	—	—	—	—	—	—	—	US: 43,878+
To the Pain	Released: November 8, 2005; Label: Bieler Bros.; Formats: CD, digital download	147	—	—	—	—	8	—	—	US: 130,000+
Vengeance	Released: November 6, 2007; Label: Bieler Bros.; Formats: CD, digital download	129	—	—	16	—	15	—	—	
Miracle	Released: May 4, 2010; Label: Rocket Science; Formats: CD, digital download	60	10	—	6	—	12	16	—	
Nonpoint	Released: October 9, 2012; Label: Razor & Tie; Formats: CD, digital download	63	17	—	6	—	13	29	—	
The Return	Released: September 30, 2014; Label: Razor & Tie / Metal Blade; Formats: CD, digital download	39	3	—	1	—	5	7	—	
The Poison Red	Released: July 8, 2016; Label: Spinefarm; Formats: CD, digital download, vinyl record	73	7	20	2	—	2	7	17	
X	Released: August 24, 2018; Label: Spinefarm; Formats: CD, digital download	—	—	13	17	—	—	—	28	
The Last Word	Released: September 18, 2026; Label: Spinefarm; Formats: CD, digital Download	—	—	—	—	—	—	—	—	
"—" denotes a recording that did not chart or was not released in that territory.

=== Independent albums ===
Album details
Separate Yourself
- Released: December 8, 1997
- Label: Independent
- Format: CD, CS
Struggle
- Released: May 18, 1999
- Label: Jugular Records
- Format: CD, LP

=== Live albums & compilations ===
List of not numbered albums, with selected chart positions
Title	Album details	Peak chart positions
Title	Album details	US Ind.
Live and Kicking	Released: November 7, 2006; Label: Bieler Bros.; Formats: CD	23
Icon: Best of Nonpoint	Released: April 5, 2011; Label: Geffen / UMG; Formats: CD, digital download	—
"—" denotes a recording that did not chart or was not released in that territory.

=== Extended plays ===
Title	Album details
Overture	Released: 2002; Label: MCA; Format: CD
Ruthless	Released: December 27, 2021; Label: 361 Records; Format: Digital
Heartless	Released: November 17, 2023; Label: 361 Records; Format: Digital

== Singles ==
List of singles, with selected chart positions, showing year released and album name
Title	Year	Peak chart positions						Album
Title	Year	US Bub.	US Dig.	US Act. Rock	US Main. Rock	US Rock	UK	Album
"Back Up"	2000	—	—	—	—	×	—	Statement
"What a Day"	2000	—	—	14	24	×	—	Statement
"Endure"	2001	—	—	36	—	×	—	Statement
"Your Signs"	2002	—	—	29	36	×	—	Development
"Circles"	2003	—	—	—	—	×	—	Development
"The Truth"	2004	—	—	18	22	×	—	Recoil
"In the Air Tonight"	2004	3	70	34	34	×	181	Recoil
"Rabia"	2004	—	—	—	—	×	—	Recoil
"Bullet with a Name"	2005	—	—	21	22	×	—	To the Pain
"Alive and Kicking"	2006	—	—	34	36	×	—	To the Pain
"Explain Yourself"	2006	—	—	—	—	×	—	To the Pain
"March of War"	2007	—	—	25	28	×	—	Vengeance
"Wake Up World"	2007	—	—	—	—	×	—	Vengeance
"Hands Off"	2008	—	—	—	—	×	—	Vengeance
"Miracle" (featuring Chad Gray)	2010	—	—	15	19	44	—	Miracle
"Frontlines"	2010	—	—	—	—	—	—	Miracle
"Crazy"	2011	—	—	—	—	—	—	Miracle
"Left for You"	2012	—	—	16	17	49	—	Nonpoint
"That Day"	2013	—	—	21	24	—	—	Nonpoint
"Breaking Skin"	2014	—	—	—	17	—	—	The Return
"Misery"	2015	—	—	—	—	—	—	The Return
"Generation Idiot"	2016	—	—	—	32	—	—	The Poison Red
"Divided... Conquer Them"	2016	—	—	—	—	—	—	The Poison Red
"Chaos and Earthquakes"	2018	—	—	—	29	—	—	X
"Fix This"	2019	—	—	—	—	—	—	X
"Ruthless"	2021	—	—	—	18	—	—	Ruthless EP
"When Doves Cry"	2021	—	—	—	—	—	—	Ruthless EP
"Paper Tigers"	2022	—	—	—	—	—	—	Heartless EP
"Heartless"	2023	—	—	—	32	—	—	Heartless EP
"A Million Watts"	2023	—	—	—	—	—	—	Heartless EP
"Underdog"	2024	—	—	—	—	—	—	Non-album single
"Beast" (with Stitched Up Heart)	2026	—	—	—	—	—	—	Medusa
"Is It"	2026	—	—	—	33	—	—	The Last Word
"—" denotes a release that did not chart. "×" denotes periods where charts did not exist or were not archived.

=== Promotional singles ===
List of promotional singles, showing year released and album name
Title	Year	Album
"Back Up" / "What a Day"	2000	Statement
"The Tribute" / "Victim"	2000	Statement
"The Wreckoning"	2006	To the Pain
"Everybody Down"	2007	Vengeance
"Shadow"	2010	Miracle
"Dodge Your Destiny"	2018	X
"Red Yeti"	2026	The Last Word

== Music videos ==
Title	Year	Director	Ref.
"What a Day"	2001	David Palmer	
"Endure"	2001	Matt Bass	
"Mindtrip"	2001	Unknown	
"Your Signs"	2002	Jeff Renfroe	
"The Truth"	2004	Matt Bass	
"In the Air Tonight"	2004	Darren Doane	
"Bullet with a Name"	2005	Darren Doane	
"Alive and Kicking"	2006	Unknown	
"Miracle"	2010	Dale Resteghini	
"Frontlines"	2010	Unknown	
"Left for You"	2012	Ramon Boutviseth	
"I Said It"	2013	Ramon Boutviseth	
"Breaking Skin"	2014	Justin Reich	
"Generation Idiot"	2016	Eric Richter	
"Divided.. Conquer Them"	2016	Justin Reich	
"Chaos and Earthquakes"	2018	Eric Richter	
"Wheel Against Will"	2018	Unknown	
"Fix This"	2019	Eric Richter	
"Remember Me (A Frontlines Tribute)"	2020	Unknown	
"Ruthless"	2021	Francesca Ludikar	
"When Doves Cry"	2021	Francesca Ludikar	
"Back In The Game"	2021	Francesca Ludikar	
"Paper Tigers"	2022	Alex Zarek	
"A Million Watts"	2023	Jake Jarvi	
"Underdog"	2024	Drew Johnston	
"Is It"	2026	Drew Johnston	
