= Planetfest =

US music festival

Planetfest was a music festival staged yearly by what used to be WPLA Planet Radio 107.3 in Jacksonville, Florida at Metropolitan Park. It was started in 1999 and, with the exception of 2001, has continued every year since then. The show is known for its relatively low ticket prices for the large number of national and local bands. The event featured some of the biggest names in indie rock and attendance has grown each year.

For WPLA's 10th anniversary in 2005, the station held a "Mutha Shuckin' Birthday" in the Spring at the Expo Center of the Jacksonville Fairgrounds instead of Metropolitan Park.

== Setup ==
Planetfest is a music festival with two stages for the performing musicians. The Main Stage is where the featured performers play 45-60+ minute sets with 30 minute breaks between acts for stage preparation and breakdown.

A smaller stage, called the JackRabbits Stage, is named after the local venue where a Battle of the Bands competition is held to select the local bands that will play at the festival. In 2008, that contest was scheduled to occur between September 21 and October 12. The top nine acts perform 30-45 minute sets at Planetfest.

== Previous festivals ==
=== Planetfest 10 ===
- Concert date: November 14, 2009.
- Attendance: TBA
- Ticket price: $15 deadbeat presale October 2 / $25 in advance / $35 at the gate
- Main Acts: Papa Roach, Chevelle, Jet, Framing Hanley, Skindred, Halestorm, Shawn Fisher & The Jukebox Gypsies (Jax band recently signed to Universal Republic), Adelitas Way, Name:Bran
- Local Acts: The Embraced, Love Lies & Therapy, Down Theory, Sumthin Else, Supercollide, Broken Trust, Society Red, None Like Us, A Fall to Rise
- Originally scheduled to appear: TBA

=== Planetfest 9 ===
- Concert date: November 8, 2008.
- Attendance: 10,000 (sold out)
- Ticket price: $15 deadbeat presale / $25 in advance / $35 at the gate
- Main Acts: Hinder, Shinedown, Puddle of Mudd, Red Jumpsuit Apparatus, Rehab, His Name Was Iron, Red
- Local Acts: Ten West, Hollowpoint Militia, Harloe, Blistur, Penny 4 Your Thought, Shawn Fisher and the Jukebox Gypsies (Now Son Of A Badman), JoEveritt, The Embraced, Name: Bran
- Originally scheduled to appear: N/A

=== Planetfest 8 ===
- Concert date: November 17, 2007.
- Attendance: almost 12,000
- Ticket price: $25 prior to the show / $35 at the gate
- Main Acts: Breaking Benjamin, Drowning Pool, Finger 11, Seether, Trapt, Amaru
- Local Acts: Harloe, Penny for Your Thoughts, Amidine, Secret State, JoEveritt, Hollowpoint Militia, Pliny the Younger, Five Star Failure, Devereux
- Originally scheduled to appear: Sum 41. Due to an injury, they canceled their remaining tour appearances, including Planetfest 8.

=== Planetfest 7 ===
- Concert date: November 18, 2006
- Attendance: 10,000+
- Ticket price: $20 in advance, $30 at the gate
- Main Acts: Buckcherry, Crossfade, The Red Jumpsuit Apparatus, Hinder, 18 Visions, Hoobastank, Candlebox, Bound
- Local Acts: Dummo, Decidedly, Feedback, Amidine, Fidelity Crisis, Harloe, Down Theory, Dang and Embraced.
- Originally scheduled to appear: Blue October—Not there due to Injury
- Notes: Lex and Terry presented Red Jumpsuit with a "Best of Jax" award for best local band. The city put a limit of 10,000 tickets for the event, resulting in a sell-out crowd. It was the first sell-out since 2003 when Staind headlined the festival.

=== Planetfest 6 ===
- Concert date: November 20, 2005
- Attendance:
- Ticket price: $20 in advance; $30 day of show.
- Main Acts: Allele, Cold, P.O.D., Shinedown, Silvertide
- Local Acts: Nonpoint, The Red Jumpsuit Apparatus

=== Mutha Shuckin' Birthday ===
- Concert date: May 8, 2005
- Attendance:
- Ticket price: $25 in advance/$35 day of show
- Main Acts: 3 Doors Down, Alter Bridge, Breaking Benjamin, The Exies, No Address, Skindred, Sum 41, Thirty Seconds to Mars, Unwritten Law
- Notes: Mutha Shuckin' Birthday celebrated the ten-year anniversary of WPLA in Jacksonville. While Planetfest takes place in the fall at Jacksonville's Metropolitan Park, Mutha Shuckin' Birthday took place in the spring at the Jacksonville Expo Center Fairgrounds.

=== Planetfest 5 ===
- Concert date: October 24, 2004
- Attendance: 8,000+
- Ticket price: $18
- Main Acts: Authority Zero, Chevelle, Future Leaders of the World, Papa Roach, Saliva, Skindred

=== Planetfest 4 ===
- Concert date: October 19, 2003
- Attendance:
- Ticket price: $15 Advanced $22 Day of Show
- Main Acts: Authority Zero, Sevendust, Shinedown, Staind, Ünloco
- Local Acts: Allele, Burn Season, Yellowcard

=== Planetfest 3 ===
- Concert date: September 22, 2002
- Attendance:
- Ticket price: $13 in advance, $20 day at the gate
- Main Acts: Audiovent, Earshot, Kidneythieves, Off By One, Sevendust, Shinedown, Unwritten Law, The Used
- Local Acts: The Weekend

=== Planetfest 2 ===
- Concert date: October 21, 2000
- Attendance:
- Ticket price:
- Main Acts: 8stops7, Battery, Dexter Freebish, Dust for Life, Fenix*TX, Fuel, Lifehouse, Nine Days, The Union Underground

=== Planetfest ===
- Concert date: October 24, 1999
- Attendance:
- Ticket price:
- Main Acts: Days of the New, Eve 6, Jimmie's Chicken Shack, Joydrop, Lifehouse, Shades Apart, Splender, Stroke 9
- Local Acts: Big Sky, Tether's End
- Notes: Lifehouse recorded video for their 2001 hit single "Hanging By A Moment", though the footage from the concert was never used for the music video
