= Ghosts in the Machine =

Studio album by Switched
- Released: January 10, 2006
- Recorded: Spider Studios in Cleveland, Ohio – Live in Miami, Florida
- Genre: Nu metal
- Length: 37:50 (Disc 1); 49:51 (Disc 2)
- Label: Corporate Punishment Records
- Producer: Ben Schigel

Switched chronology
Subject to Change (2002)	Ghosts in the Machine (2006)

Singles from Ghosts in the Machine
- 1. "Empty Promises" Released: January 10, 2006

Professional ratings
Review scores
Source	Rating
audioabrasion.com	link
Melodic.net	link

Ghosts in the Machine is the second album by the Ohio nu metal band Switched. This is a two-disc album, with the first disc featuring 11 tracks that were intended for the band's second release under their previous label, Immortal Records. The quality of these songs are rough, as they were still in the demo phase. The second disc includes 12 tracks in total, 8 demo tracks – 7 of which featured on their debut album Subject to Change and one b-side track "She Blinded Me with Science". The remaining four tracks are live performances.

== Track listing ==
Disc 1:

1. "Save Myself" – 3:59
2. "Like Suicide" – 3:22
3. "Empty Promises" – 3:43
4. "Shattered" – 3:25
5. "Who Feels" – 3:36
6. "I'm Falling" – 3:01
7. "Circles" – 3:19
8. "Travel On" – 3:17
9. "Drowning" – 2:52
10. "Into Disaster" – 3:12
11. "Memories of You" – 4:00

Disc 2:

1. "Spread (New Recording)" – 4:13
2. "Inside (Demo)" – 4:16
3. "Skins (Demo)" – 3:42
4. "Wrong Side (Demo)" – 4:08
5. "Anymore (Demo)" – 3:42
6. "Darkening Days (Demo)" – 3:41
7. "Last Chance (Demo)" – 4:12
8. "She Blinded Me with Science (Demo)" – 4:05
9. "Anymore" (Live) – 4:23
10. "Religion" (Live) – 4:58
11. "Ten Dead Fingers" (Live) – 3:39
12. "Four Walls" (Live) – 4:48

Note(s):

- Track 1 is a re-recording featuring the then current lineup with Josh Jansen on bass and Angel on drums
- Tracks 2–8 are demo tracks.

== Personnel ==
- Ben Schigel – Vocals
- Bradley Kochmit – Guitars
- Joe Schigel – Guitars
- Corey Lowery – Bass
- Chad Szeliga – Drums

== Notes ==
- Produced by: Ben Schigel.
- Additional production: Tony Gammalo.
- Live Tracks + "Spread" produced by Jason Bieler and mixed by Toby Wright.
- Additional guitar performed by Tony Gammalo.
- Bass on Subject To Change/Disc 2 tracks performed by Tony Gammalo.
- Tracks (Disc 1) 1–11 and (Disc 2) 2–7 recorded at Spider Studios, Cleveland, Ohio.
- Tracks (Disc 2) 9–12 recorded live in Miami, Florida, on July 28, 2001.
