= Spread Your E.P. =

EP by Switched
- Released: 2001
- Genre: Nu metal
- Length: 21:23
- Label: Immortal
- Producer: Jason Bieler

Switched chronology
Spread Your E.P. (2001)	Subject to Change (2002)

Spread Your E.P. is the second EP album from American nu metal band Switched.

== Track listing ==
All tracks are written by Switched.

No.	Title	Length
1.	"Spread"	3:41
2.	"Anymore (live)"	4:21
3.	"My Own Religion (live)"	4:56
4.	"Ten Dead Fingers (live)"	3:37
5.	"Four Walls (live)"	4:48

== Credits ==
- Track 1 produced by Jason Bieler; mixed by Toby Wright
- Tracks 2, 3, 4, and 5 recorded live in Miami, Florida on July 28, 2001 by Jason Bieler
