= Paradigm in Entropy =

Studio album by Bleed the Sky
- Released: April 19, 2005
- Recorded: October 31, 2004 – November 28, 2004
- Studio: Spyder Studios, Strongsville, OH
- Genre: Metalcore, groove metal
- Length: 40:53
- Label: Nuclear Blast
- Producer: Ben Schigel

Bleed the Sky chronology
Bleed the Sky (EP) (2004)	Paradigm in Entropy (2005)	Murder the Dance (2008)

Professional ratings
Review scores
Source	Rating
AllMusic	3/5 stars

Paradigm in Entropy is the debut album by American metal band Bleed the Sky. It was released on April 19, 2005, through Nuclear Blast Records.

== Track listing ==
1. "Minion" – 4:11
2. "Killtank" – 3:37
3. "Paradigm in Entropy" – 3:34
4. "Skin Un Skin" – 4:08
5. "Leverage" – 3:56
6. "The Martyr" – 5:50
7. "Gated" – 3:02
8. "God in the Frame" – 3:57
9. "Division" (feat. T.J. Frost & Joe Cafarella of STEMM) – 3:26
10. "Borrelia Mass" – 5:09

== Personnel ==
- Noah Robinson - vocals
- Kyle Moorman - guitar
- Wayne Miller - guitar
- Casey Kulek - bass
- Austin D’Amond - drums, backing vocals
- Luke Anderson - samples, electronics, backing vocals

Production

- Ben Schigel - producer, engineering, mixing
- Logan Mader - mastering
- Noah Robinson - co producer
- Kyle Moorman - co producer
