= Subject to Change (Switched album) =

Studio album by Switched
- Released: February 26, 2002; January 10, 2006 (reissue)
- Recorded: 2001
- Genre: Nu metal
- Length: 45:50
- Labels: Immortal Records/Virgin Records; Corporate Punishment (reissue)
- Producers: Jason Bieler, Switched, Howard Benson (reissue), Rick Will (reissue)

Switched chronology
Subject to Change (2002)	Ghosts in the Machine (2006)

Singles from Subject to change
- 1. "Inside" Released: 2002

Professional ratings
Review scores
Source	Rating
AllMusic	2.5/5 stars
melodic.net	3/5 stars

Subject to Change is the debut album by the Ohio nu metal band Switched. It was released on February 26, 2002 via Immortal Records and went on to sell over 40,000 copies in US.

On January 10, 2006 the album was re-released. This revised version, released on January 10, 2006 via Corporate Punishment Records contains four bonus tracks and two enhanced music videos for the single "Inside".

The album was produced by Jason Bieler and the band, except for the song "Walk Away" which was produced by Howard Benson and recorded during a separate session from the rest of the album.

== Track listing ==
All tracks are written by Brad Kochmit and Ben Schigel, except where noted.

No.	Title	Writer(s)	Length
1.	"Inside"		3:50
2.	"Four Walls"	Kochmit; B. Schigel; Shawn May	4:22
3.	"Walk Away"		2:56
4.	"Religion"	Kochmit; B. Schigel; Joe Schigel	5:20
5.	"10 Dead Fingers"		3:24
6.	"Reflections"		3:39
7.	"Anymore"	Kochmit; B. Schigel; May	3:44
8.	"Skins"		3:34
9.	"Wrongside"		3:39
10.	"Last Chance"	Kochmit; B. Schigel; May	4:02
11.	"Exterminate"		3:40
12.	"Darkening Days"		3:39

=== Re-release ===
No.	Title	Length
13.	"Spread"	3:42
14.	"Walkaway" (Howard Benson Mix)	3:01
15.	"Inside" (Howard Benson Mix)	3:11
16.	"Inside" (Rick Will Mix)	3:28

- Note: Tracks 13–15 are bonus tracks, which did not appear on the album's original version. track 16 was originally on the same track as "Darkening Days" as a hidden song with prolonged silence separating the two.

== Personnel ==
- Ben Schigel - vocals
- Brad Kochmit - guitar
- Joe Schigel - guitar
- Chad Szeliga - drums
- Shawn May - bass
- Jason French - bass on "Walk Away"
