= X (Nonpoint album) =

Studio album by Nonpoint
- Released: August 24, 2018
- Studio: Uptown Recording Studio
- Genre: Alternative metal
- Length: 36:18
- Label: Spinefarm
- Producer: Fred Archambault

Nonpoint chronology
The Poison Red (2016)	X (2018)	The Last Word (2026)

X is the eleventh studio album by American metal band Nonpoint. It was released on August 24, 2018. It was produced by Fred Archambault, and released through Spinefarm Records. It was the last to feature lead guitarist BC Kochmit, who left Nonpoint in 2019.

== Background ==
Prior to recording X, the ensemble took a one-year hiatus from music. In June 2018, the band published "Chaos and Earthquakes" as well as "Dodge Your Destiny". The video for "Chaos and Earthquakes" was shown in early August 2018, followed by a United States tour with He Is Legend and Letters from the Fire to promote the album.

== Critical reception ==
Regarding lead song "Empty Batteries", Ray Van Horn of Blabbermouth.net states, "Though the track offers little new other than the usual melodic proto core NONPOINT have long served to its fans, there's urgency to the strumming and the song's dense projection. Even the breakdown flexes with a pump instead of merely bridging."

Joe DiVita of Loudwire states that '"Dodge Your Destiny" leans further into the rock direction than the more rap-addled "Chaos and Earthquakes", though both songs are guitar-centric. The former hinges on clobbering chugs and quick-strike drum fills while the former moves freely against a steady beat and circular guitar melodies.'

Jedd Beaudoin of PopMatters describes "Chaos and Earthquakes" as "a state of the personal union, a call to perseverance despite knowing that you stand on the precipice of utter destruction".

Trent Cornell of Overdrive Music Magazine went on to say that '"Fix This" is more ballad-like compared to what we've heard thus far, building from a hushed, clean verse towards one of the band's catchiest choruses yet'.

== Track listing ==
All tracks are written by Nonpoint and Rob Ruccia, except where noted.

No.	Title	Writer(s)	Length
1.	"Empty Batteries"		3:56
2.	"Chaos and Earthquakes"		3:45
3.	"Fix This"		3:50
4.	"Crashing"	Nonpoint; Ruccia; Clint Lowery	2:54
5.	"Passive Aggressive"		3:48
6.	"Dodge Your Destiny"		3:28
7.	"Wheel Against Will"		3:54
8.	"Milestone"		3:36
9.	"Feel the Way I Feel"		3:49
10.	"Position One"		3:18
Total length:			36:18

Deluxe edition bonus tracks
No.	Title	Writer(s)	Length
11.	"Paralyzed"	Nonpoint; Ruccia; Fred Archambault	3:27
12.	"Fix This" (acoustic)		3:35
13.	"Generation Idiot" (live)	Nonpoint	4:01
Total length:			47:21

== Personnel ==
Nonpoint

- Elias Soriano – lead vocals
- BC Kochmit – lead guitar, backing vocals, piano
- Rasheed Thomas – rhythm guitar, backing vocals
- Adam Woloszyn – bass
- Robb Rivera – drums, percussion

Technical personnel

- Fred Archambault – production, mixing, engineering, programming
- Rob Ruccia – engineering, mixing (13), assistant engineering, programming
- Rasheed Thomas – engineering (1-12), assistant engineering
- BC Kochmit – programming
- Howie Weinberg – mastering

== Chart positions ==
- US Digital albums – No.13
- US Hard Rock – No.17
- Top Album Sales – No.28

=== Singles ===
List of singles, with selected chart positions, showing year released and album name
Title	Year	Peak chart positions
Title	Year	US Main. Rock
"Dodge Your Destiny"	2018	—
"Chaos and Earthquakes"	2018	29
"Fix This"	2019	—
"—" denotes a release that did not chart. "×" denotes periods where charts did not exist or were not archived.
