= Metropolitan Park (Florida) =

Park and concert venue in Jacksonville, Florida

- Location within Florida
- Location: 64 Gator Bowl Boulevard, Jacksonville, Florida, U.S.
- Coordinates: 30.318498726°N 81.636497454°W
- Area: 18.25 acres (0.0739 km^{2})
- Established: 1982; 44 years ago
- Operator: Jacksonville Department of Parks, Recreation and Community Services
- Open: Year round
- Website: Metropolitan Park

Metropolitan Park is a 18.25-acre (73,900 m^{2}) urban waterfront park and concert venue located between EverBank Stadium and the north bank of the St. Johns River in Downtown Jacksonville, Florida. It is projected to be the eastern terminus of the northbank Jacksonville Riverwalk and "is likely the most legislated, negotiated and studied parcel of land owned by the city." Since 2024 an extensive redesign effort has been underway and the marina has been closed. In 2026 design should be finalized and construction should commence. The marina should reopen in summer of 2026.

== Facility ==
The multi-purpose facility contained an exhibition mall for art, crafts and boat shows, a family picnic and playground area, and an earthen "bowl" with a performance pavilion which had a capacity of 10,000 persons and was home to many annual events, including The Jacksonville Jazz Festival, World of Nations Celebration, Spring Music Festival, Freedom, Fanfare & Fireworks on July 4, Planetfest and many more. The Jacksonville Symphony Orchestra occasionally performed there, as have many nationally known entertainers.

The primary facility was a 2,400-square-foot (220 m^{2}) reversible stage with seating for 3,000 under the large canopy. There was a green room, production office and dressing rooms for performers. The park had full boat docking facilities with 78 boat slips. There were 6 covered picnic shelters and 43 picnic tables, 3 permanent restroom facilities and water fountains, a children's play area, grills, benches & bicycle racks, and security lighting for night use.

== History ==
The land was part of a tract purchased by the United States Maritime Commission for $1.375 million and utilized by the St. Johns River Shipbuilding Company to construct 82 Liberty ships during World War II from 1942 to 1945. In 1944 they employed 20,000. The park is located on what was once a landfill, purchased in May 1972 for $1 million by the United States Department of Housing and Urban Development. The present park size is the result of several additions since the initial acquisition in 1972.

=== Initial development ===
Development funding was provided by the City of Jacksonville, the Florida Department of Natural Resources, and public broadcasting station WJCT (TV), which leased 8 acres in 1977 to build and operate a community facility.

The project was designed for two phases. Phase 1 consisted of an exhibition mall, family picnic area, playgrounds, and the Performance Pavilion. Florida Governor Bob Graham attended the groundbreaking for the first phase, begun on December 8, 1982 by Mayor Jake Godbold. The pavilion was built by WJCT for approximately $1.4 million, which included $600,000 from Florida National Bank. It was named, the Florida National Pavilion.

Work on Phase 1 was completed in 1984 at a cost of $1 million. Metropolitan Park won the 1986 Governor's Design Award. Phase 2, which included landscaping, paved walkways, lighting, parking, and the entrance, cost another $1 million. Mayor Tommy Hazouri began the enhancements on May 10, 1990 and construction lasted several months.

=== Fire department ===
The Catherine Street Fire Museum was moved to Metro Park property in 1993 but did not open to the public until 2001. In 1995, Marine Fire station 39 relocated from Catherine Street to Metropolitan Park. The JFRD Marine Unit closed at Metropolitan Park in 2024 and is being rebuilt on the south side of the Hart Bridge ramp.

=== Kids Kampus ===

Community leaders created the Metropolitan Park Kids Kampus Task Force in the 1990s to provide input for a new children's play area with physical, intellectual and social benefits. Educators were utilized to design structures and activities that allow children to be curious, explore and manipulate their physical environment.

Construction began on Kids Kampus March 8, 2000, and the 10-acre facility, located beside Metro Park, opened March 6, 2001. The park included a soccer field with bleachers, 10 Picnic shelters and individual picnic tables, grills, playground equipment, benches, bike racks, security lighting and a restroom. The largest attraction was a bicycle/tricycle driving range, modeled after downtown Jacksonville, including street signs, traffic signals and buildings. The seasonal water park at Kids Kampus featured "Three Friends", a boat-shaped structure with water cannons and a slide; and "Bayou, Bogs & Frogs" for children under six.

On May 5, 2010, JaxParks announced that the Splash Water Park at Kids Kampus would not open for 2010 due to impending demolition as part of Metropolitan Park renovations. That announcement did not explicitly state that Kids Kampus would not return, but the Metro Jacksonville website noted that the Metropolitan Park Concept Plan included a small "Children's Discovery" area and the "Green" where the Kids Kampus was previously located. As of September 9, 2011, all traces of Kids Kampus had been removed and the area became a grassy field.

=== Peyton initiative ===
On November 15, 2008, 40 citizens from Jacksonville were joined by landscape architects and professional urban planners in a Charrette, a community visioning exercise for the future direction of Metropolitan Park. JaxPride, a nonprofit citizen coalition, sponsored the workshop, and the process was used previously on the Hemming Park to Hemming Plaza transition and several others. The Jacksonville Economic Development Commission director told the participants how his agency viewed the park and afterwards, Mayor John Peyton shared his thoughts:

I am not proud of the quality of this City-owned facility. What we currently have is a grade-A space with grade-D facilities. There's more chain-link fence in that park than anywhere in Jacksonville. People in Seattle would give their right arm to have a riverfront park. I'm going to do everything in my power in the next 31 months until I leave office to make Metropolitan Park a better place for all of us.

The City of Jacksonville contracted with consulting firm HDR, Inc. to submit a preliminary Metropolitan Park Improvement Project Master Plan to the City by the end of January, 2009. HDR staff collected hundreds of pages of suggestions, comments, sketches, drawings and ideas from the charrette to review and use in the plan.

A meeting was held in January, 2010 between Mayor Peyton and several city councilmen to discuss progress on three major downtown improvement projects, including redevelopment of Metropolitan Park. Legislation was filed to fund these three projects with a price tag of $23 million. $8.2 million was allocated to phase one of the Metropolitan Park redevelopment which included replacing the Kidz Kampus children's play area with better water features and access to the Fire Museum; removing fencing and other barriers to river access; and creating a 4-acre public lawn for a wide array of activities, and to include more picnic pavilions and shade trees. On February 9, 2010 the city council passed the three bills without debate, providing final approval for all three projects.

The plan was never implemented because the owners of SunTrust Tower requested financial assistance to build a 500-car parking garage. In September 2011, the city council shifted the $3.5 million allocation from Metropolitan Park redevelopment to the parking garage, killing the project.

== Underutilization ==
Despite plans made while John Peyton was in office, the park was not a priority under mayors Alvin Brown and Lenny Curry. Events continued to be staged at the park including Planetfest, a music festival held yearly from 1999 to 2009 by WPLA (FM), a precursor to Welcome to Rockville, initially on Mother's Day, May 8, 2011, then annually through 2019 when it was relocated to the Daytona International Speedway. The Jacksonville Jazz Festival began using the park in 1982 and has continued using it in addition to downtown venues and Daily's Place. The World of Nations Celebration began in Met Park in 1993 and celebrated 34 years in 2026.

The Florida National Pavilion and concrete stage, built in 1982, were demolished in 2016.

The park has been underfunded and underutilized for years. Following the election of Mayor Donna Deegan in 2023 a park revitalization team was assembled in 2024.

== Planning ==
The city of Jacksonville contracted with Civitas, Inc., a landscape architecture firm headquartered in Denver to plan and design Metropolitan Park for the future. It is a component of Jacksonville's $1.1B North Riverfront development. The city set aside $13 million in funding. The mayor’s budget included $200 million for three downtown parks: Riverfront Plaza, Shipyards West and Met Park.

Designers from Civitas revealed the final conceptual designs for the project on December 18, 2024. A basic requirement is the need to handle flooding from future storms. The park is in the Gullah-Geechee Cultural Heritage Corridor, so the design pays tribute to local descendants of enslaved people. Attendees were able to view interactive stations with the park's projected elements:

- The Performance Lawn is the park’s largest space that preserves the existing live oaks while hosting 10,000 concertgoers.
- The Ramble has paths that explore wild areas and mature oaks.
- Tailgate Plaza features an interactive water feature and hillside play; movies can be shown on the welcome lawn and celebrations staged on the plaza.
- The Living Edge along the riverfront will handle storm surge and filters stormwater before it returns to the river.
- The Riverwalk within the park is not linear and concrete. It meanders through greenspace and over the St. Johns.
- The Canopy Walk is an elevated, accessible walkway through the trees with views along the river.
- The Marina is expected to open summer of 2026 with 78 boat slips and floating docks.

== Gallery ==
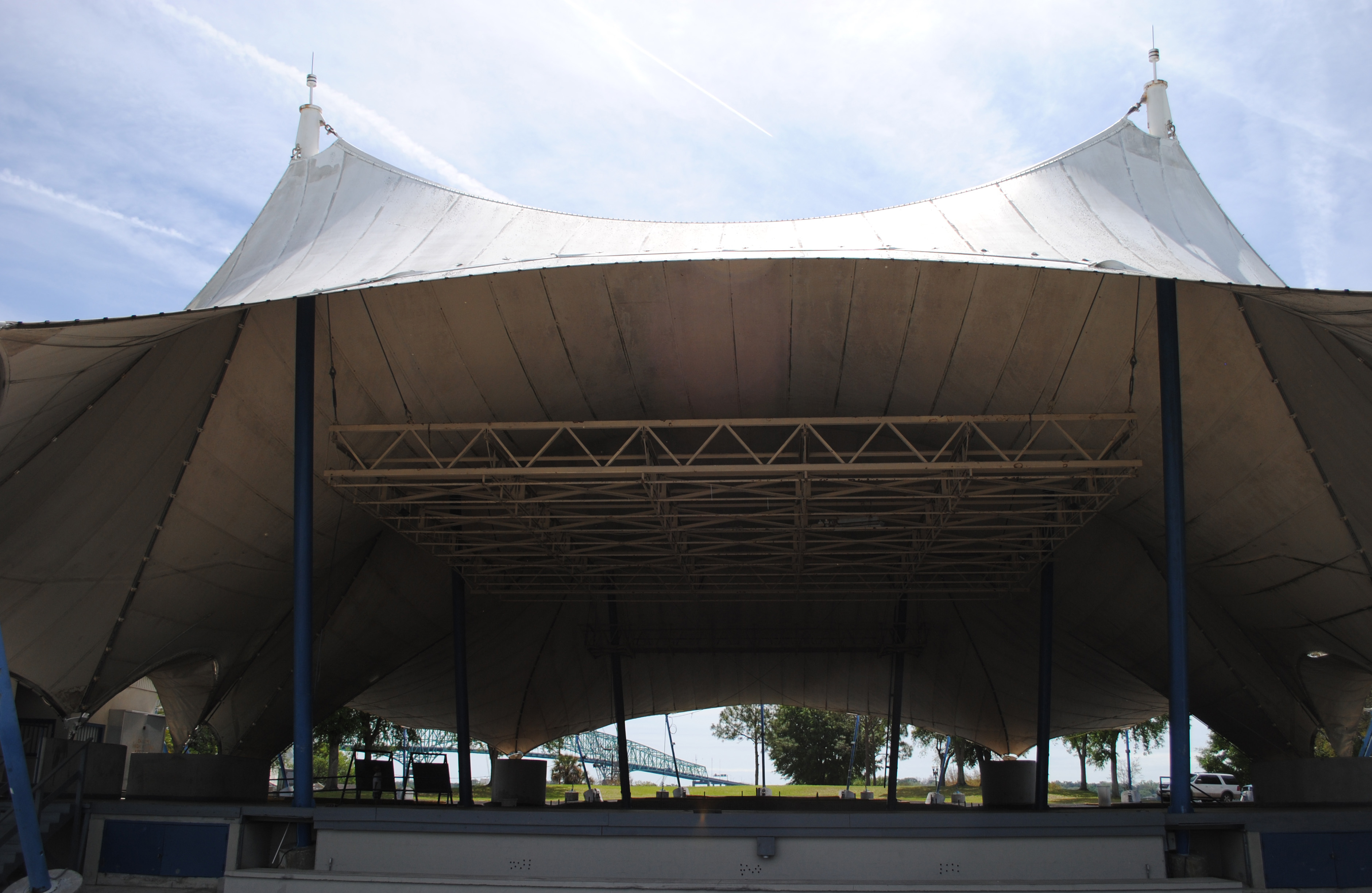
Pavilion tent located on the north end of the park (c.2013)

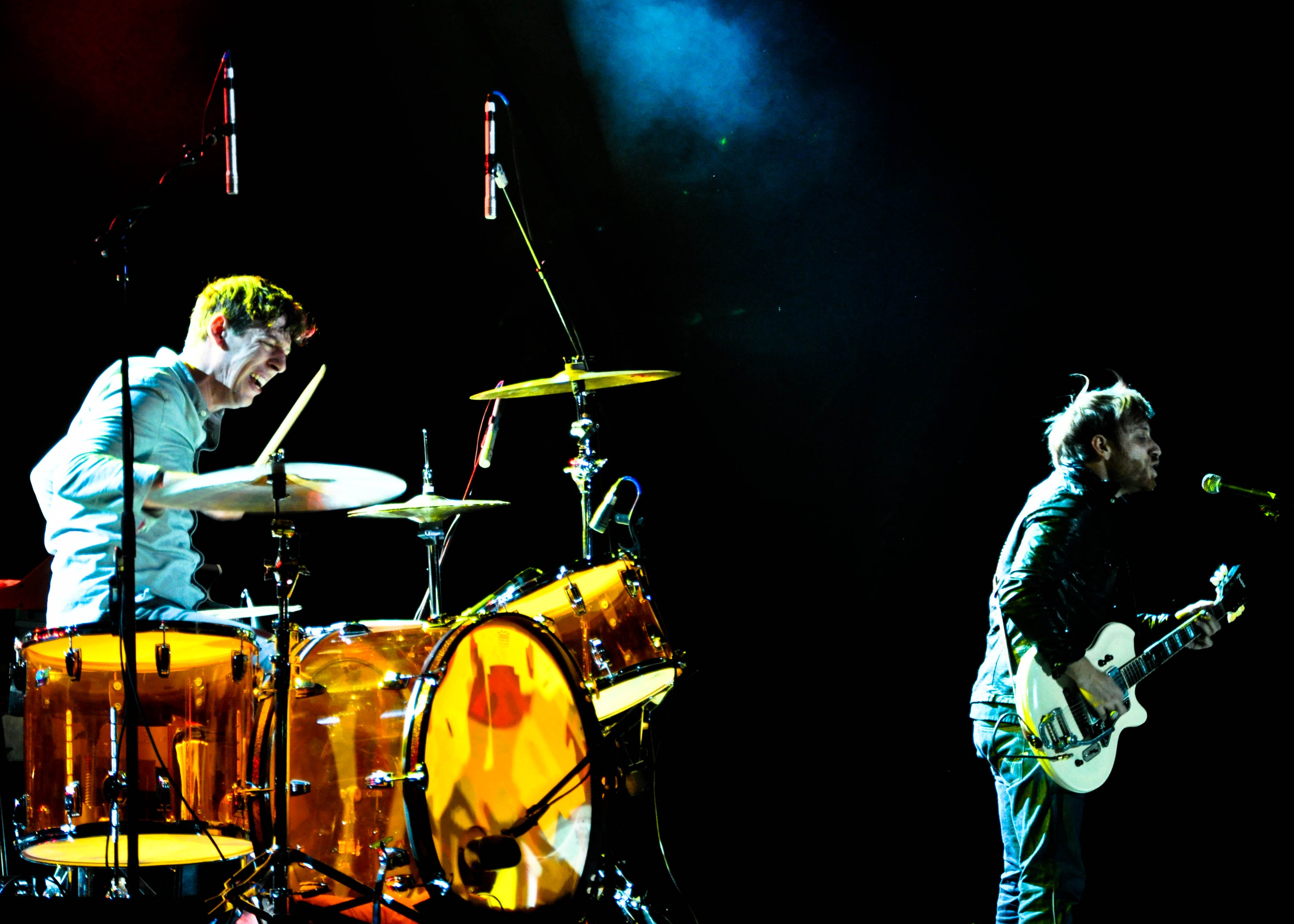
The Black Keys at The Big Ticket in 2010

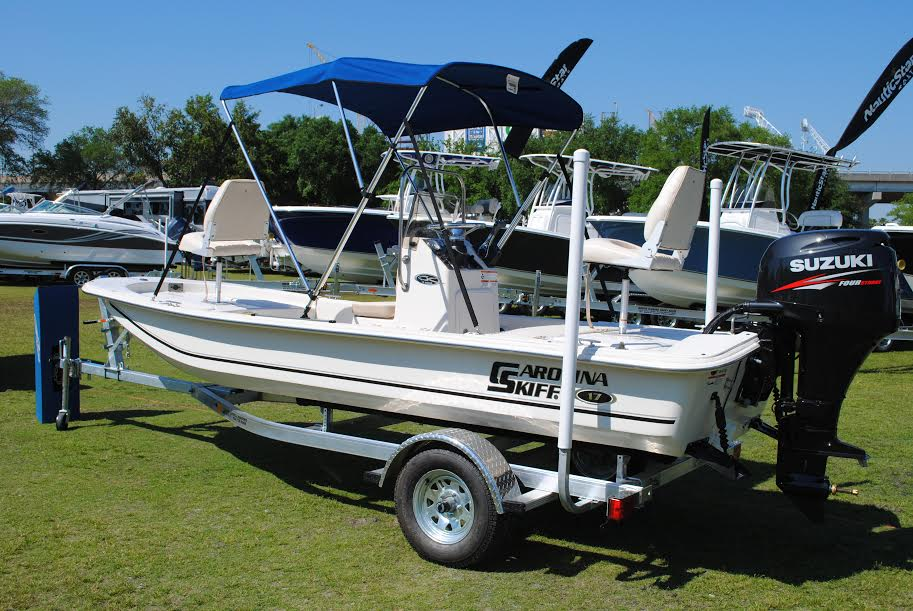
Southeast US Boat Show in April 2014

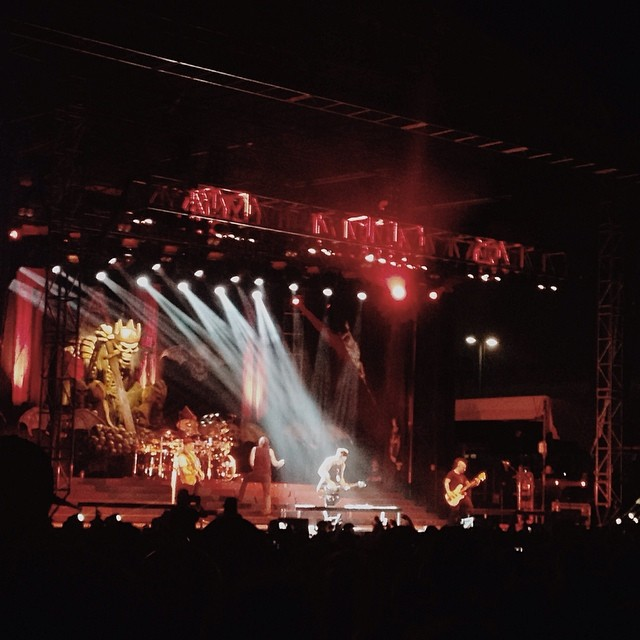
Avenged Sevenfold at Welcome To Rockville in 2014

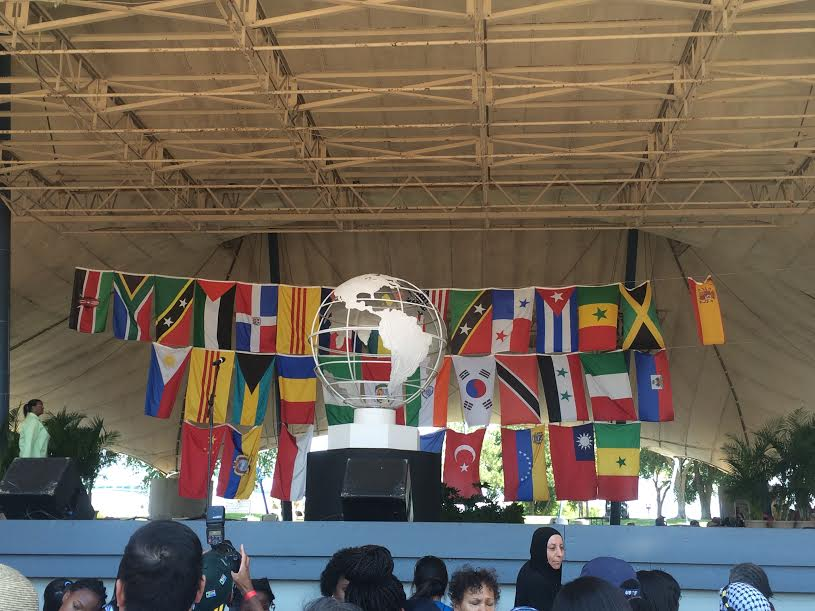
The annual World of Nations Celebration

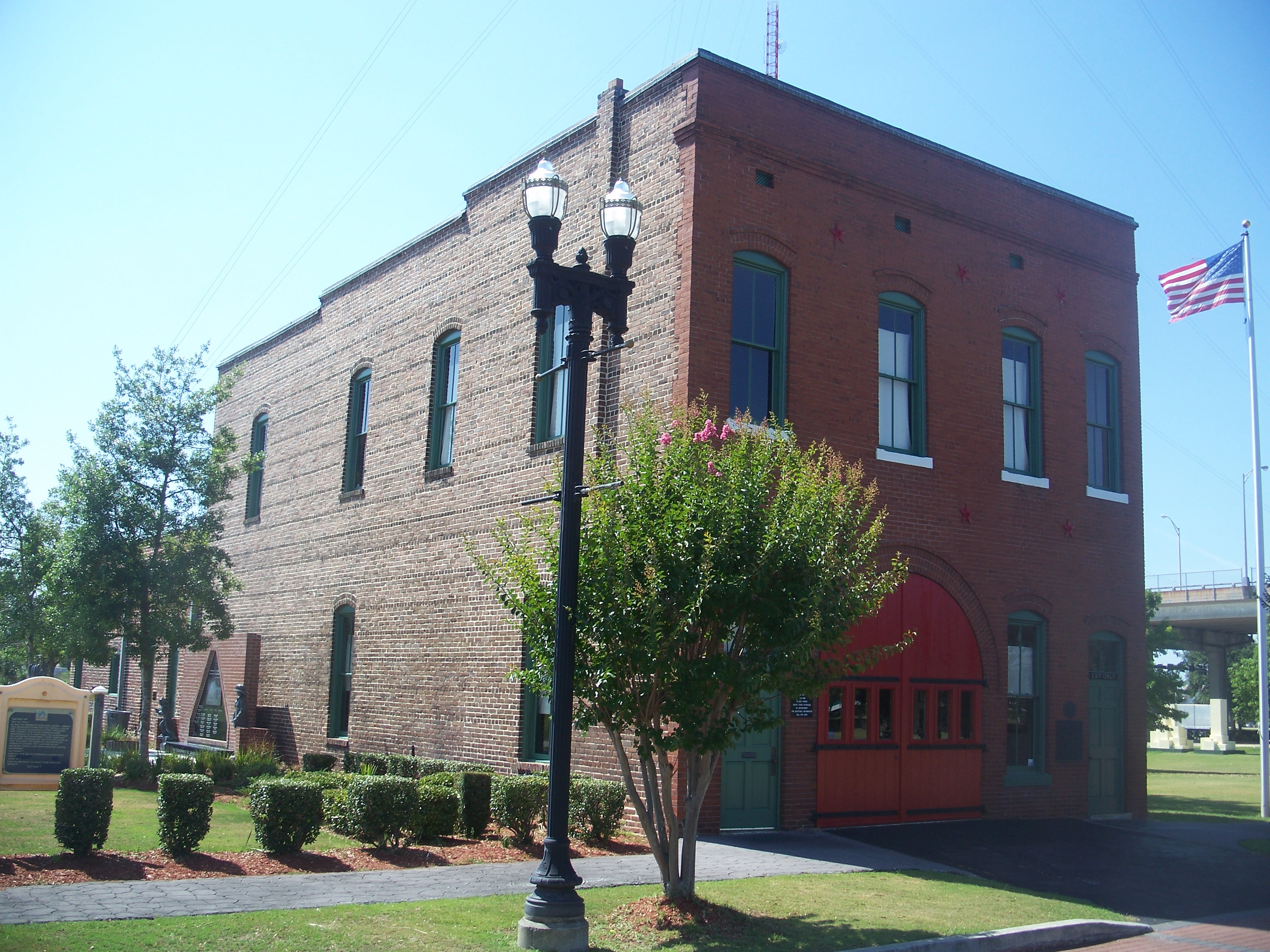
Jacksonville Fire Museum is adjacent to Metropolitan Park.to
