= World of Nations Celebration =

Annual international festival held in Jacksonville, Florida

Coordinates: 30.3228°N 81.6336°W

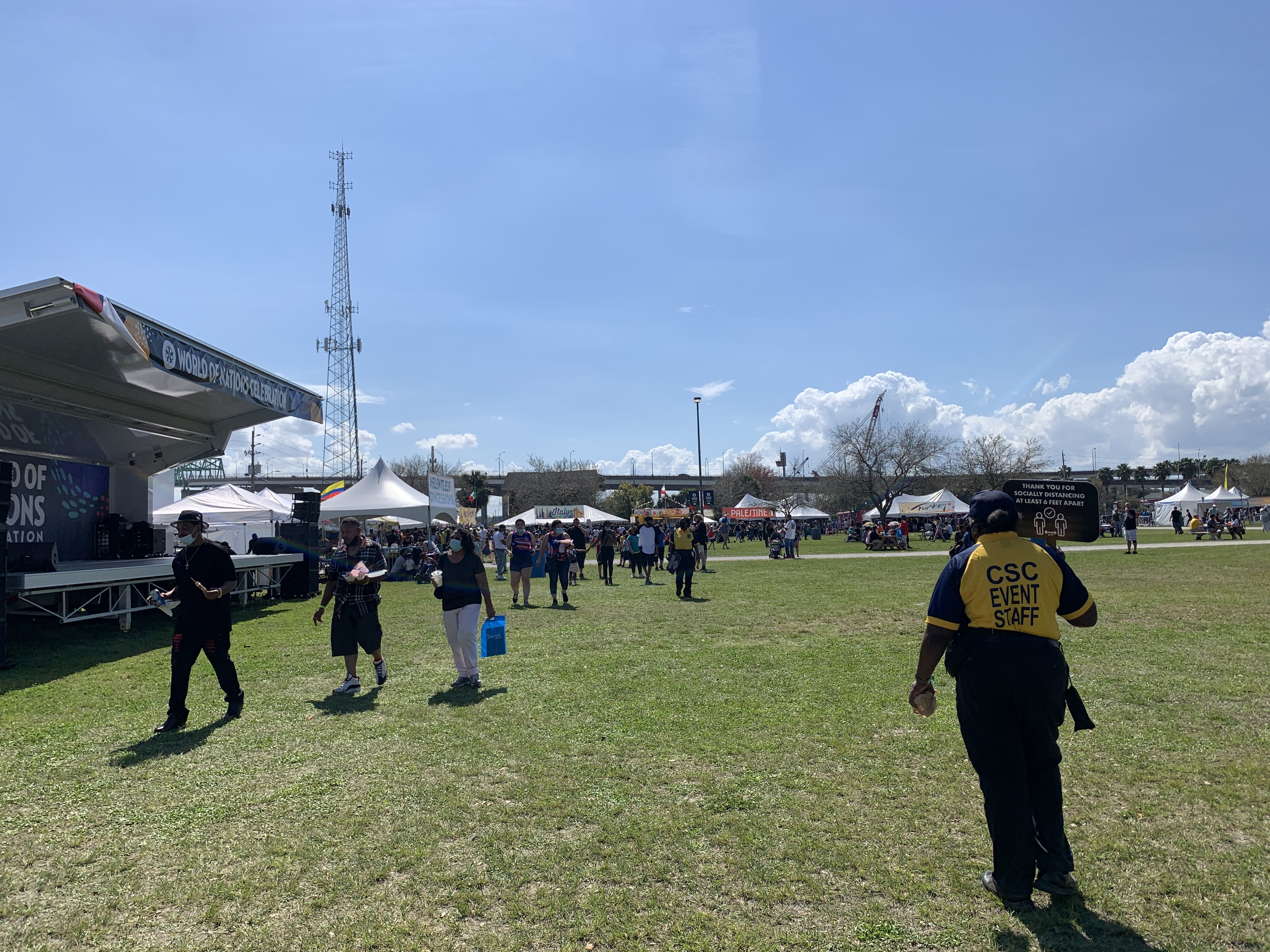
2021 World of Nations Celebration

Celebration logo 2008

World of Nations Celebration is an annual international festival held in Jacksonville, Florida, U.S. It is North Florida's largest multicultural festival, and features exhibitions and events from a variety of countries. It has been held at Metropolitan Park every February–May since 1993.

The celebration is designed to showcase the diverse immigrant and international communities of Jacksonville and the northeast Florida area. It hosts over 75,000 visitors, including 12,000 children on school field trips. On Saturday morning, there is a naturalization ceremony at 10:00 am, where as many as 50 people become U.S. citizens.

Each "country" represented has its flag on display, at least one person speaking that country's official language, and serving food native to that nation. Many play traditional music and demonstrate their style of dance or relate stories from their culture. Artwork and clothing/costumes representing the country are also exhibited. The celebration also includes the "World of Kids Playland", which features arts and crafts and other programs for children.

Countries represented vary each year. Past celebrations have included Brazil, Cambodia, the Caribbean, China, Colombia, Democratic Republic of Congo, Cuba, the Dominican Republic, Ethiopia, the French Caribbean, Ghana, Haiti, India, Italy, Jamaica, Japan, Laos, Lebanon, Mexico, Native America, Nigeria, Norway, Panama, Peru, the Philippines, Poland, Puerto Rico, South Korea, Taiwan, the United States, Turkey, Venezuela, and Vietnam.

2021 sees strict measures undertaken against the COVID-19 pandemic, such as wearing masks and social distancing.
