= Murder the Dance =

Studio album by Bleed the Sky
- Released: June 10, 2008
- Recorded: April–July 2007 in Reseda, California
- Genre: Metalcore, groove metal
- Length: 63:46
- Label: Nuclear Blast (US); Massacre Records (Europe)
- Producer: Christian Olde Wolbers

Bleed the Sky chronology
Paradigm in Entropy (2005)	Murder the Dance (2008)	This Way Lies Madness (2020)

Murder the Dance is the second studio album by American metal band Bleed the Sky. It was released on June 10, 2008, in the United States through Nuclear Blast Records and on June 13 in Europe through Massacre Records. It features a total of 13 tracks, one of which being hidden.

The album was originally scheduled to be released by the end of 2007 and was finished recording by July of that same year. Due to internal issues within the band, its release was delayed. Bleed the Sky acquired new guitarist Justin Warrick who helped finish the recording of the album. The album was completed as of January 2008.

== Track listing ==
1. "Knife Fight in a Phone Booth" – 3:41
2. "Sullivan" – 3:54
3. "Murder the Dance" – 4:16
4. "The Sleeping Beauty" – 4:25
5. "Morose" – 5:27
6. "Occam's Razor" – 4:04
7. "Bastion" – 4:14
8. "Slavior" – 4:40
9. "Kettle Black" – 3:23
10. "Poseidon" – 4:20
11. "The Demons That Could Be" – 3:49
12. "Vertical Smile" – 17:35

== Personnel ==
- Noah Robinson – vocals
- Rob Thornton – guitar
- Justin Warrick – guitar, backing vocals
- Ryan Clark – bass
- Austin D'Amond – drums, backing vocals
- Wayne Miller – writing credit on "The Demons That Could Be" but did not record

Additional musicians

- Sons of Nero – artwork
- Ryan Clark – backing vocals

Production

- Christian Olde Wolbers – producer, engineering, mixing, mastering
