= Bleed the Sky (band) =

American metalcore band

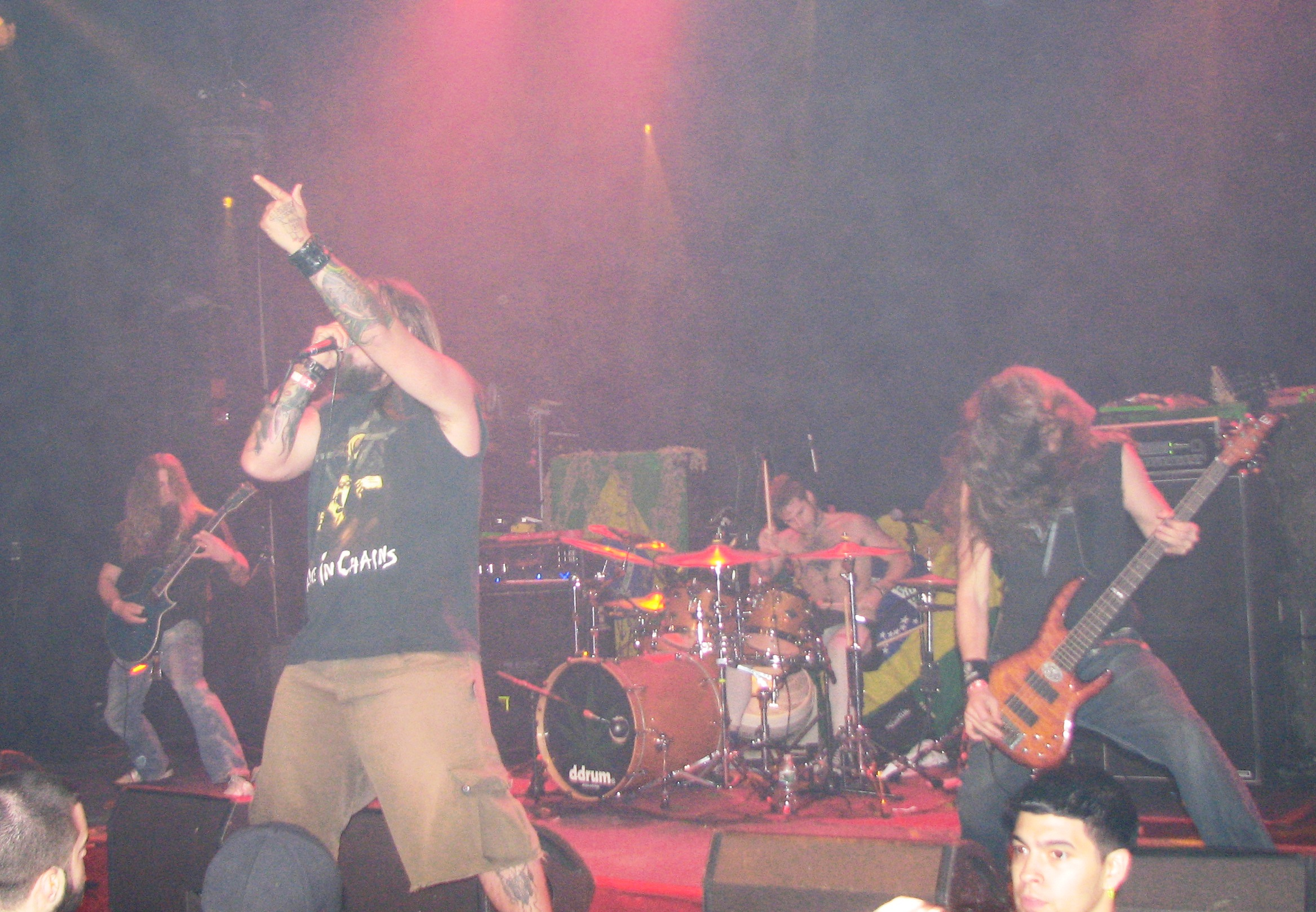
- Bleed the Sky performing in 2008

Background information
- Origin: Orange County, California, U.S.
- Genres: Metalcore; groove metal; deathcore
- Years active: 2003–2009; 2017–present
- Labels: Nuclear Blast; Massacre; Art is War; Intercept
- Members: Austin D'Amond; Wayne Miller; David Culbert; Kevin Garcia; Monte Barnard
- Past members: Noah Robinson; Casey Kulek; Kyle Moorman; Daylen Elsey; Rob Thornton; David "Tank" Garcia; Ryan Clark; Justin Warrick; Luke "Puck" Andersen; Rudy Flores
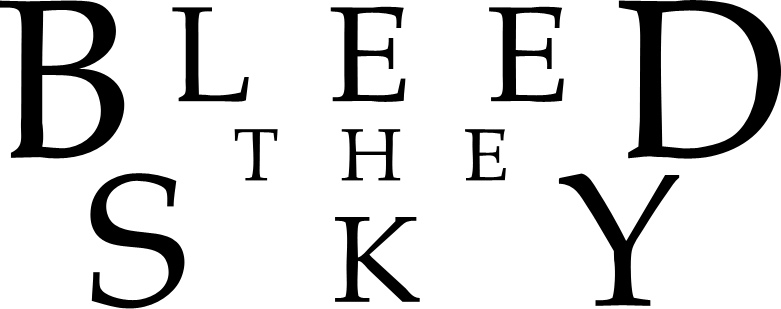

Bleed the Sky is an American metalcore band from Orange County, California, formed in 2003. They have released three studio albums, Paradigm in Entropy (2005), Murder the Dance (2008), and This Way Lies Madness (2020).

== History ==
=== Formation and Paradigm in Entropy (2003–2006) ===
The band formed in January 2003 and is considered to be part of the new wave of American heavy metal movement. The band consisted of vocalist Noah Robinson, guitarists Kyle Moorman and Wayne Miller, bassist David "Tank" Garcia, and drummer Austin D'Amond. After being a band for only two months, Bleed the Sky played their first show as an opener for progressive death metal band Opeth. Shortly after, they independently recorded and released a demo EP, Bleed the Sky, recorded at Cleveland's Spider Studios with Producer, and former Chimaira manager, Thom Hazaert and engineered and mixed by Ben Schigel. The EP caught the attention of Emerica who was working on a compilation CD and thought Bleed the Sky would make a good addition. The EP also gained attention of locals as the band also started to headline and sellout local shows. Bleed the Sky toured with legendary hardcore band Integrity throughout the summer of 2003. Due to the large following that Bleed the Sky developed selling out shows along the Sunset Strip in Hollywood, CA, they received an endorsement by Jägermeister and soon caught the attention of Nuclear Blast Records. Bleed the Sky signed a worldwide deal with Nuclear Blast on November 11, 2004, and began working on their debut full-length album.

Producer Ben Schigel (Chimaira, Integrity, Drowning Pool) contributed his talent in the making of Paradigm in Entropy, the band's first studio album. While recording, on January 3, 2005, the band parted with bassist Casey Kulek due to "personal reasons". He was replaced by Daylen Elsey. The new album, Paradigm in Entropy, was released on April 19, 2005.

After the release of the new album, Bleed the Sky toured extensively throughout North America opening for bands such as Silent Civilian, Ill Niño, Chimaira, Arch Enemy, Static-X, Dope, God Forbid, American Head Charge, Disturbed, My Ruin and Diecast. In November 2005, they joined the Persistence Tour in Europe opening up for Agnostic Front, The Red Chord, Napalm Death and Hatebreed. Towards the end of their touring cycle for "Paradigm in Entropy" the band began having internal issues, bringing about a few lineup changes. On September 9, 2006, the band announced the departure of guitarist Kyle Moorman citing that he wanted to pursue other elements of the music business. Moorman was later replaced by David Culbert. On January 3, 2007, the band announced that guitarist Wayne Miller would be departing from the band. While on tour with Dope in June 2006, Miller was rushed to the hospital due to severe pneumonia and an unknown viral infection. He ended up getting sepsis and went into organ shock. Miller was in the hospital for 2 weeks. After getting out of the hospital, while the band was still on tour, he went home to recover. He ended up in a car accident that later left nerve damage in his left hand that required months of rehab. He was eventually replaced by Rob Thornton. Wayne Miller was still involved with the band, as he was a key part in Bleed the Sky's business deals whilst co-managing the band alongside Archetype Management.

=== New lineup, Murder the Dance, and hiatus (2007–2009) ===
Bleed the Sky went into the studio on April 11, 2007, to record their second album. It was produced by Fear Factory's Christian Olde Wolbers; Ben Schigel mixed, and Matt Rosebery mastered. They finished recording in July 2007, but due to lineup changes and internal struggles, post-production was delayed several months. Justin Warrick joined the band and replaced David Culbert. The album is titled Murder the Dance and features a special guest appearance by Jeremy Hall from Audkik as a vocalist on one of the tracks. It was released on June 10, 2008, on Nuclear Blast Records in the US, and on Massacre Records in Europe. On May 10, the band released two new songs from the album entitled "Sullivan" and "Bastion". On their MySpace page, lead singer Noah Robinson discussed the making of the new album:

"Our inspiration for this album was listening to all the stuff we grew up on. During every part of this recording, we had some sort of drink in our hand. We wanted to be relaxed and comfortable. We're finally putting out the record that nearly killed us. This is exactly what we wanted to do from the beginning, but we just weren't really sure how. We wanted to make the end-all, be-all record, and I think we accomplished that. Everything on this album is blood, sweat, and tears, even the hidden track. The first part of it are voicemails that somebody left us, and the second part was kind of last-minute. When you hear it, you can tell. It was played on Quincy Jones' piano at Westlake Studios in Beverly Hills. Bottom line, we can't wait to hit the road again and show everyone the new BLEED THE SKY!!!"

Bleed the Sky shot a video in Oklahoma for "Sullivan" with David Brodsky (Hate Eternal, The Red Chord, Soilent Green) which debuted on Headbanger's Ball on October 4, 2008. Guitarist Rob Thornton left Bleed the Sky in the beginning of 2009 due to their extensive touring schedule. Bleed the Sky continues on with one guitarist, Justin Warrick. Shortly after, Rob Thorton's departure, Bleed the Sky completed a successful tour as direct support for Soulfly in 2009. Bleed the Sky also did a successful headlining tour with support from Straight Line Stitch, Ekotren and Within Chaos. November 1, 2009, former guitarist, Rob Thorton suddenly died at his home in Texas at the age of 35. Bleed the Sky went on hiatus.

=== Return from hiatus and This Way Lies Madness (2017–present) ===
In 2017, Alleged rumors on social media sites, such as Facebook, stated that Bleed the Sky might be having a reunion.

On April 22, 2018, Bleed the Sky shared photos from the studio and confirmed work on a third full-length album. The first single, "Quiet Here", was released on March 26, 2019. The band announced of October 23, 2019, that they signed to Art Is War Records for the upcoming release of their new album, titled This Way Lies Madness, which was released on January 17, 2020. They also announced a headlining tour for January and February 2020 with Skinlab, Arise in Chaos, and So This Is Suffering. Due to the COVID-19 pandemic, they ended up postponing any future touring and went back into the studio. They released their single "The Devil Will See You Now" on October 30, 2020, through Art Is War Records/Intercept Music. This was the bands first song to break 1,000,000 streams on Spotify.

On April 19, 2022, it was announced the band had parted ways with vocalist Noah Robinson and the band's new vocalist would be revealed soon. On April 25, Rudy Flores of So This Is Suffering was announced as the band's new vocalist. The band also released a music video for a new song, "Rot in Flesh", featuring Flores. However, on July 13, it was announced Flores was fired from the band since him and the band were "not able to see eye to eye on a lot of important issues".

On February 21, 2023, the band announced Monte Barnard as the new vocalist, and released a single "The Parasite", featuring Barnard and Chimaira vocalist Mark Hunter. On April 26, 2023, Bleed The Sky released their second single with Monte Barnard, "Soul Collapse".

On November 15, 2023, the band announced that they are back in the studio to record their fourth album, which was due for release in 2024.

=== Other projects ===
Drummer Austin D'Amond played drums for Chimaira from 2011 until the band's dissolution in 2014, appearing on their album Crown of Phantoms. He also played drums for Chimaira's one-off reunion in 2017 when drummer Andols Herrick could not attend. Austin D'Amond also joined DevilDriver as their full-time drummer from 2015 to 2022, and he also joined to a supergroup called Vented in 2021 replacing Joey Jordison. Guitarists Wayne Miller and Kevin Garcia played in Solus Deus, along with drummer Austin D'Amond and guitarist Rocky Gray of Evanescence/Living Sacrifice fame from 2012–2017.

== Band members ==
=== Current ===
- Austin D'Amond – drums, backing vocals (2003–2009, 2017–present)
- Wayne Miller – guitar (2003–2007, 2017–present)
- David Culbert – bass (2017–present), guitar (2006–2007)
- Kevin Garcia – guitar (2017–present)
- Monte Barnard – vocals (2023–present)

=== Former ===
- Noah Robinson – vocals (2003–2009, 2017–2021)
- Kyle Moorman – guitar (2003–2006)
- David "Tank" Garcia – bass (2003)
- Luke "Puck" Andersen – samples and sequencing, backing vocals (2003–2007)
- Casey Kulek – bass (2003–2005)
- Daylen Elsey – bass (2005–2006)
- Ryan Clark – bass (2006–2009)
- Justin Warrick – guitar, backing vocals (2007–2009)
- Rob Thornton – guitar (2007–2008)
- Rudy Flores – vocals (2022)

== Discography ==
- Bleed the Sky (2004, self-produced EP)
- Paradigm in Entropy (2005, Nuclear Blast Records)
- Murder the Dance (2008, Nuclear Blast Records, Massacre Records)
- This Way Lies Madness (2020, Art Is War Records)

=== Music videos ===
- "Minion"
- "Sullivan"
- "Quiet Here"
- "Serpent"
- "The Devil Will See You Now"
- "Rot in Flesh"
- "The Parasite" featuring Mark Hunter
- "Soul Collapse"
