= The Poison Red =

Studio album by Nonpoint
- Released: July 8, 2016
- Recorded: Uptown Recording Studio, Chicago
- Genre: Nu metal, alternative metal
- Length: 47:45
- Label: Spinefarm
- Producer: Rob Ruccia, Nonpoint

Nonpoint chronology
The Return (2014)	The Poison Red (2016)	X (2018)

Singles from The Poison Red
- 1. "Generation Idiot" Released: May 26, 2016; 2. "Divided.. Conquer Them" Released: November 10, 2016

The Poison Red is the tenth studio album by American nu metal band Nonpoint. It was produced by Rob Ruccia and released on July 8, 2016, via Spinefarm Records. The band released two singles from the album: "Generation Idiot" and "Divided.. Conquer Them". It is the first album to feature lead guitarist B.C. Kochmit.

== Reception ==
Professional ratings
Review scores
Source	Rating
Cryptic Rock	5/5 stars
Metal Injection	6.5/10
New Noise Magazine	4/5 stars
Ultimate Guitar	6.7/10

The Poison Red has received generally positive reviews from music critics. Megan Lockard (Cryptic Rock) praised the album and stated that "Nonpoint has used The Poison Red to highlight the story of life, beautifully. With lyrics that illustrate the different trials people face every day and hard-hitting beats to fill in the rest of the story, The Poison Red is an album full of deep, rich emotion." Nicholas Senior of New Noise Magazine wrote, "The Poison Red is a really fun album that harnesses the right amount of anger, mixing it in with shout-a-long choruses and meaty riffs."

Riley Rowe of Metal Injection was more critical, stated that "Nonpoint has sharpened their songwriting, melody, and edge, but lack the capability to fully capture my attention. While I enjoyed the singles and a few tracks here and there, the overall impact of the album was a tad predictable." UG Team (Ultimate Guitar) said, "All in all, though, this record, cliches and all, isn't all that bad. You're probably not going to lose yourself in it unless you're already a huge Nonpoint fan, but the songs are good for a listen and there's a lot of good riffs and solos to like on the album."

== Track listing ==
All songs and lyrics written by Nonpoint.

No.	Title	Length
1.	"Generation Idiot"	3:27
2.	"Foaming at the Mouth"	3:30
3.	"Bottled Up Killer Bees"	3:18
4.	"Rabbit Hole (Prelude)"	0:35
5.	"Chasing White Rabbits"	3:58
6.	"Standing in the Flesh"	3:22
7.	"Divided.. Conquer Them"	3:09
8.	"Radio Chorus"	3:14
9.	"Spanish Radio Hour (Prelude)"	0:08
10.	"El Diablo"	4:07
11.	"No Running Allowed"	3:14
12.	"Promises"	4:52
13.	"Be Enough"	4:20
14.	"My Last Dying Breath"	6:35
Total length:		47:45

Best Buy deluxe edition
No.	Title	Length
1.	"Generation Idiot"	3:27
2.	"Foaming at the Mouth"	3:30
3.	"Bottled Up Killer Bees"	3:18
4.	"Rabbit Hole (Prelude)"	0:35
5.	"Chasing White Rabbits"	3:58
6.	"Standing in the Flesh"	3:22
7.	"Divided.. Conquer Them"	3:09
8.	"Radio Chorus"	3:14
9.	"Spanish Radio Hour (Prelude)"	0:08
10.	"El Diablo"	4:07
11.	"Service (Prelude)"	0:15
12.	"Walk on Water"	4:01
13.	"No Running Allowed"	3:14
14.	"Promises"	4:52
15.	"Be Enough"	4:20
16.	"All or Nothing Again"	3:08
17.	"My Last Dying Breath"	6:35
Total length:		55:09

== Personnel ==
Nonpoint

- Elias Soriano – lead vocals
- Robb Rivera – drums
- Rasheed Thomas – rhythm guitar, backing vocals
- Adam Woloszyn – bass
- B.C. Kochmit – lead guitar, backing vocals

Production

- Nonpoint – producer
- Rob Ruccia – co-producer, engineering, mixing
- Cliff Weiner – management
- Steve Davis – management
- Brad Blackwood – mastering
- B.C. Kochmit – artwork, layout, design

== Charts ==
Chart (2016)	Peak position
US Billboard 200	73
US Independent Albums (Billboard)	2
US Top Rock Albums (Billboard)	7
