= Jacksonville Fire Museum =

The Jacksonville Fire Museum
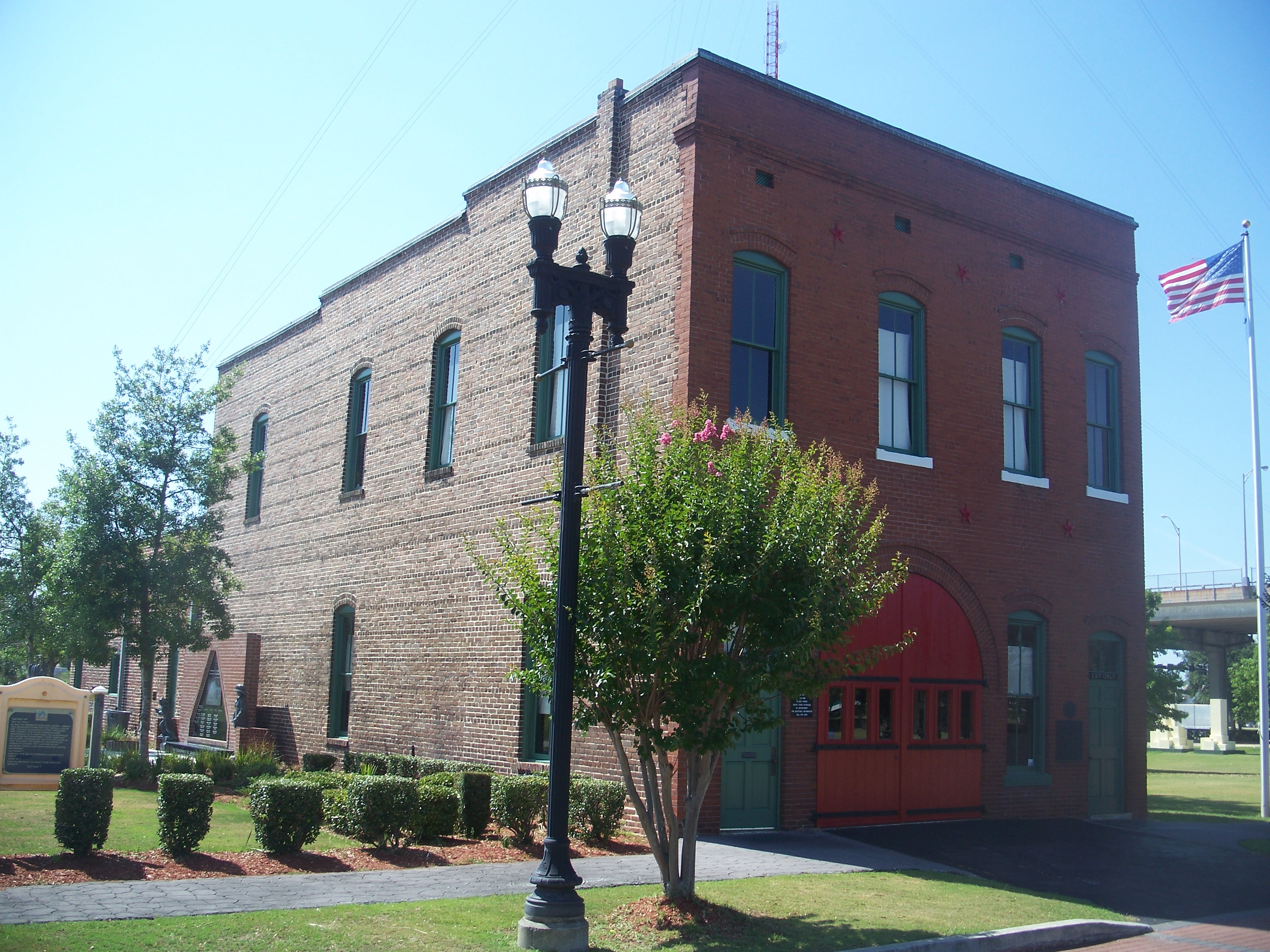

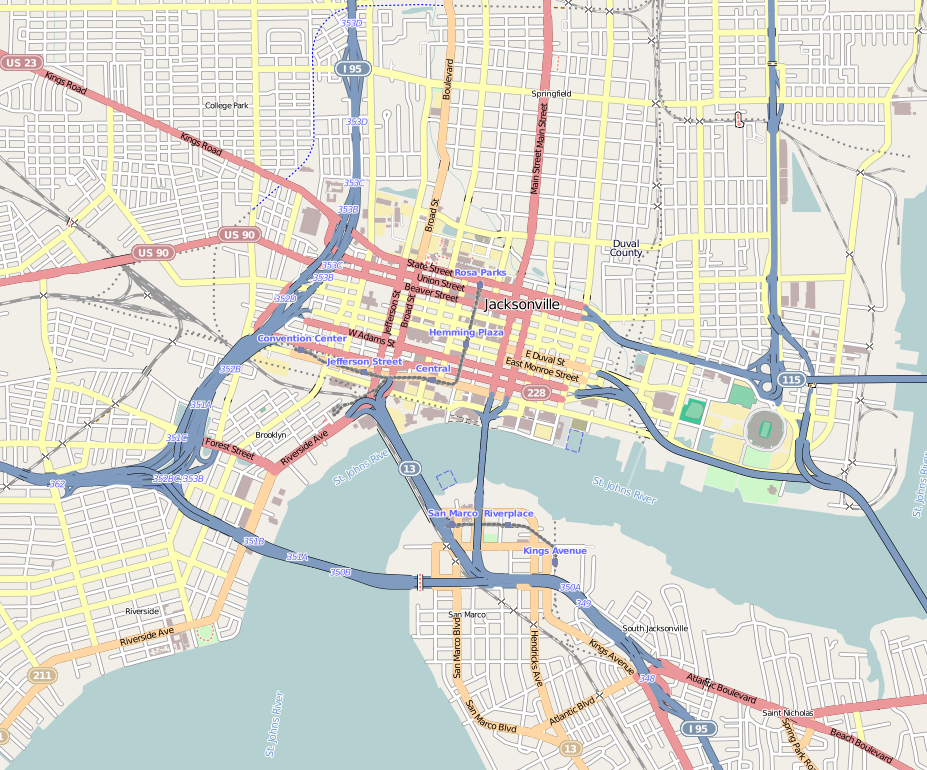
- Location of Jacksonville Fire Museum in Jacksonville Jacksonville Fire Museum (Florida)
- Established: 1982
- Location: Jacksonville, Florida
- Coordinates: 30.32500°N 81.65056°W
- Visitors: 12,677
- Director: Wyatt Taylor
- Public transit access: Bus: Talleyrand Shuttle
- Website: www.jacksonvillefiremuseum.com

The Jacksonville Fire Museum is part of the Jacksonville Fire and Rescue Department's Fire Prevention Division. The museum is home to artifacts detailing the history of the fire service not only in Jacksonville, but the entire state of Florida. Exhibits include photos from and a diorama of the Great Fire of 1901, a fully restored 1902 LaFrance horse-drawn fire engine, and a 1926 American LaFrance fire engine.

The Catherine Street Fire Station, also known as Station 3, is home to the Jacksonville Fire Museum. It is listed on the National Register of Historic Places and has been designated as an official landmark of the City of Jacksonville. Having initially been home to an African-American company of firefighters, the building is also part of Florida's Black Heritage Trail and is registered with the Northeast Florida African-American Historical Society. The station was located at 12 Catherine Street for nearly a century before being moved in 1994 to its current home adjacent to Metropolitan Park.

The museum is currently closed pending the outcome of a planned multi-use development that would utilize its land.

== Catherine Street Fire Station ==
- Catherine Street Fire Station
- Formerly listed on the U.S. National Register of Historic Places
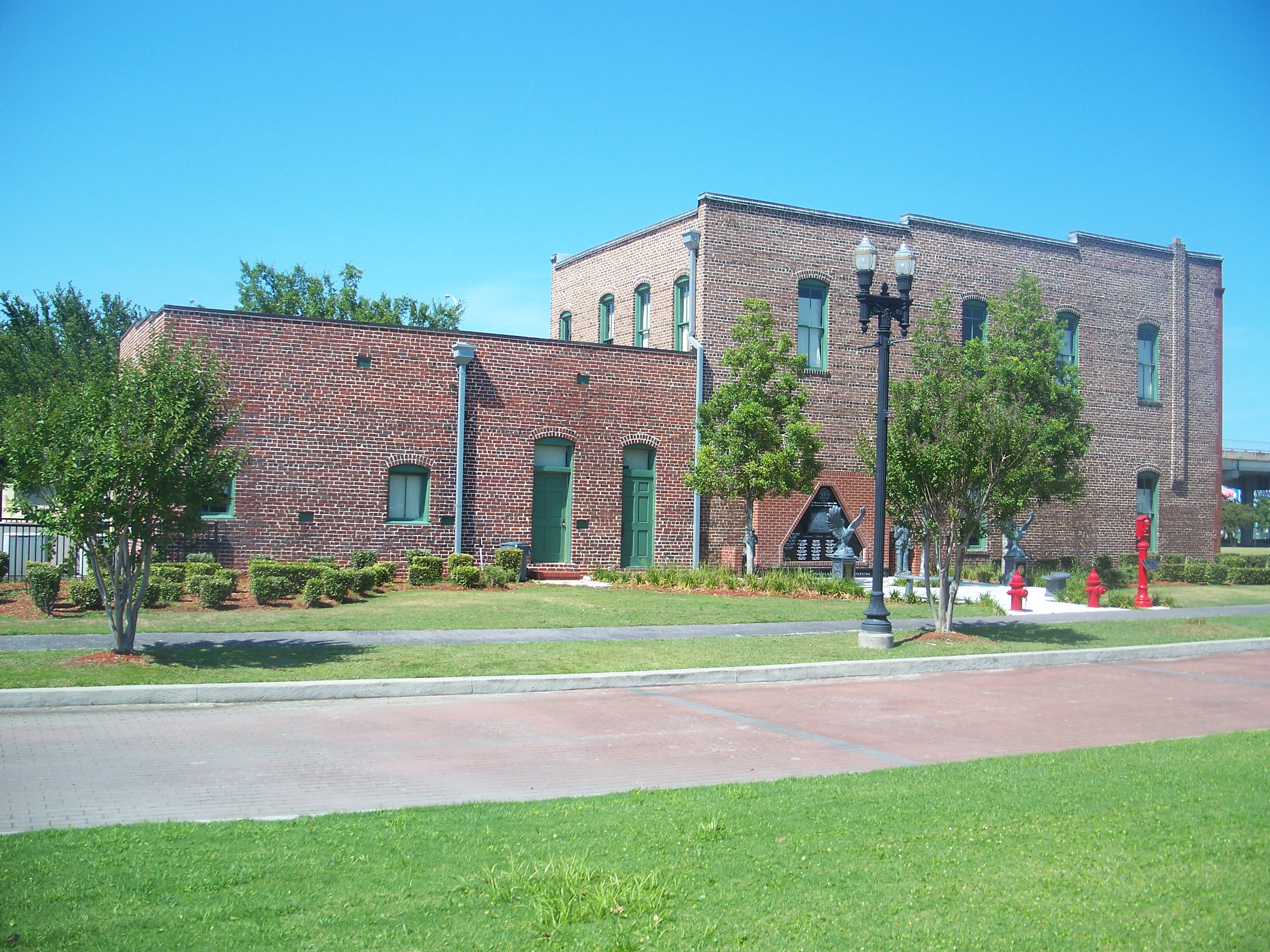
- Area: less than one acre
- Built: 1902
- NRHP reference No.: 72000309

Significant dates
- Added to NRHP: June 13, 1972
- Removed from NRHP: August 22, 2023

On April 20, 1886, the Jacksonville City Council passed an ordinance creating a professional fire department. The department initially consisted of 3 fire stations and 17 firefighters. Station 3, or the Catherine Street Fire Station, was located at 500 East Bay Street and staffed entirely by African Americans. Henry Butler served as foreman along with privates Louis M. Kelly and J. Sirmans. Station 3 was also home to a hose reel pulled by a horse named George.

After Fire Station No. 3 was disbanded in 1933, the building was used first to host the Jacksonville Fire Department shop facilities, and then as a storage facility. The Catherine Street Fire Station was added to the U.S. National Register of Historic Places on June 13, 1972 and converted into the Jacksonville Fire Museum in 1982. It was delisted on August 22, 2023.

The building was last renovated following a 1993 report highlighting a deterioration of its foundations. The building is currently closed for more renovations.
