= To the Pain =

Studio album by Nonpoint
- Released: November 8, 2005
- Genre: Nu metal
- Length: 73:11
- Label: Bieler Bros.
- Producer: Andrew Goldman

Nonpoint chronology
Recoil (2004)	To the Pain (2005)	Vengeance (2007)

Singles from To the Pain
- 1. "Bullet with a Name" Released: 2005; 2. "Alive and Kicking" Released: May 2, 2006

To the Pain is the fifth studio album released by the American nu metal band Nonpoint. It is their first release through independent label Bieler Bros. Records. The album was produced by guitarist Andrew Goldman.

The album debuted #147 on the Billboard 200 charts. It sold 9,000 copies in its first week. As of March 2006, the album has sold 130,000 copies.

The album's two singles, "Bullet with a Name" and "Alive and Kicking," are both used in the pro wrestling video game WWE SmackDown vs. RAW 2007.

== Track listing ==
All tracks are written by Nonpoint

No.	Title	Length
1.	"Bullet with a Name"	3:26
2.	"There's Going to Be a War!"	3:02
3.	"The Wreckoning"	3:44
4.	"Alive and Kicking"	3:59
5.	"Explain Yourself"	3:38
6.	"Buscandome"	4:15
7.	"To the Pain"	5:43
8.	"(Ren-Dishen)"	3:17
9.	"Explain Myself?"	4:13
10.	"Skin"	5:05
11.	"Code Red"	4:02
12.	"Wrong Before"	3:29
13.	"The Longest Beginning"	3:16
14.	"The Shortest Ending"	4:44
15.	"Untitled"	16:03
Total length:		73:11

The final track is a hidden track, separated by sixteen 4-second blank "untitled tracks". An untitled instrumental starts at 9:22 after silence, running 6:42. The release to all streaming services on December 25, 2019, includes the hidden track as part of "The Shortest Ending" after a 5:10 period of silence, bringing the total length of track 14 to 16:37. Four live tracks are included as bonuses.

== Personnel ==
Nonpoint

- Elias Soriano – lead vocals
- Andrew Goldman – guitar, backing vocals, producer, mixing
- Ken MacMillan – bass, backing vocals
- Robb Rivera – drums

Additional

- Luis González – percussion
- Mike Fuller – mastering
- Matt LaPlant – engineer, mixing
- Jason Edwards – cover model
