= Statement (album) =

Studio album by Nonpoint
- Released: October 10, 2000
- Recorded: February 2000 at Elysian Studios, Boca Raton, Florida
- Genres: Nu metal, rap metal
- Length: 47:50
- Label: MCA
- Producer: Jason Bieler

Nonpoint chronology
Struggle (1999)	Statement (2000)	Development (2002)

Professional ratings
Review scores
Source	Rating
AllMusic	3/5 stars

Statement is the major label debut, and second studio album by American nu metal band Nonpoint, and their third studio release overall. It was their first album released through MCA Records (now Geffen Records). The album debuted No. 166 on the Billboard 200 charts. The first single from the album, "What a Day", peaked at No. 24 on the Mainstream Rock charts.

== Music and lyrics ==
Statement is considered by Loudwire to be a stylistically typical release in the nu metal genre. The album combines rap vocals with singing, and is regarded as a rap metal album. According to Alex Henderson of AllMusic: "Nonpoint's Statement very much reflects a time when metalheads grew up being obsessed with hip-hop. Most of the CD is forceful, abrasive rap-metal along the lines of (hed)p.e., Korn, and Limp Bizkit." The track "Orgullo" is rapped in Spanish.

== Critical reception ==
Alex Henderson of AllMusic wrote: "Nonpoint won't win any awards for innovation. But despite its limitations and its derivative nature, Statement gives listeners an exhilarating dose of rap-metal bombast." Loudwire ranked it at #47 on its list of the top 50 nu-metal albums of all time: "Where this album fails to stand out sonically, it sure does make up for with an impressive vocal performance by frontman Elias Soriano. [...] Genuine fans of metal and rap alike, Nonpoint made something rock solid with their major label debut.

== Track listing ==
No.	Title	Length
1.	"Mindtrip"	4:04
2.	"Victim"	3:20
3.	"Endure"	2:58
4.	"Back Up"	3:16
5.	"What a Day"	3:18
6.	"Misled"	3:26
7.	"DoubleStakked"	7:43
8.	"Orgullo"	4:23
9.	"Years"	3:20
10.	"Hive"	3:45
11.	"Levels"	3:43
12.	"Tribute" (Tribute To "Children's Story", "Woo Hah! Got You All In Check," and "Method Man")	4:29
Total length:		47:50

Japanese edition
No.	Title	Length
13.	"X-Today Theme"	1:47
14.	"What A Day (Live)"	3:16
Total length:		49:37

The song "Orgullo" translates to "Pride"; it's about Soriano and Rivera's Puerto Rican Heritage. It originally appeared on the band's 1996 demo Generate.

The song "Tribute" is a cover of sorts. It mashes up Children's Story by Slick Rick, Woo-Hah by Busta Rhymes, and Method Man by the Wu-Tang Clan. Guest vocals provided by Grimm of Darwin's Waiting Room.

== Personnel ==
Members

- Elias Soriano - lead vocals
- Robb Rivera - drums
- Ken "K. Bastard" MacMillan - bass, backing vocals
- Andrew Goldman - guitars, backing vocals

Production

- Recorded and produced by Jason Bieler, at Elysian Studios, Boca Raton, Florida (on Pro Tools Mix Plus 24)
- Engineered by Jason Bieler, Keith Rose, Chad Milosevich & Spidee Plaskon
- Mixed by Tom Lord-Alge, at South Beach Studios, South Beach, Florida
- Mastered by Bob Ludwig, at Gateway Mastering, Portland, Maine
- Management by BVB Music Group
- A&R by Hans Haedelt
- Booking by Scott Sokol
- Legal by Elliot Groffman
- Photo by Matt Swig
