= Allele (band) =

American rock band

- Origin: Jacksonville, Florida
- Genres: Hard rock; alternative metal; post-grunge
- Years active: 2002–present
- Labels: Corporate Punishment; Goomba Music; Hype Music
- Members: Wally Wood; Dusty Winterrowd; Joey Rodriguez; Tyler Hensley
- Past members: Kelly Hayes; Lane Maverick; Tim Tobin; Giancarlo Autenzio; Andy Toole; Mason Romaine; Ryan St. John; Keith O'Gara

Allele is an American alternative metal band from Jacksonville, Florida.

The band was founded in 2002 by vocalist Wally Wood and former Otep guitarist Lane Maverick. The name is a reference to alleles, a term in biology that refers to different variants of a gene.

The band first signed with the label Corporate Punishment Records and released their debut album Point of Origin on October 25, 2005.

In 2011, the band switched to the Chicago label Goomba Music and later that year released their second album, Next to Parallel. Guitarist Lane Maverick had previously left the band and was replaced by Cold member Kelly Hayes, who had occasionally performed with Allele before. In August 2012, Allele signed a record deal with MTV's Hype Music label, after having previously begun working on new material. Lane Maverick rejoined the band at this time, again replacing Kelly Hayes. They next released a self-titled EP in 2013, before entering a period of inactivity.

The band returned with a single in July 2025 titled "Red Heart Love". Alongside Wood, guitarist Joey Rodriguez and drummer Dusty Winterrowd returned to the band, joined by guitarist Billy Grey of Fozzy and bassist Tyler Hensley.

== Discography ==
=== Albums ===
| Year | Album details |
|---|---|
| 2005 | Point of Origin: Released: October 25, 2005; Label: Corporate Punishment |
| 2011 | Next to Parallel: Released: September 27, 2011; Label: Goomba |

=== EPs ===
- Allele (2013)

=== Singles ===
- "Closer to Habit" (2005)
- "Stitches" (2006)
- "Red Heart Love" (2025)
