= The Return (Nonpoint album) =

Studio album by Nonpoint
- Released: September 30, 2014
- Recorded: February 2014, at Groovemaster Studios, Chicago
- Genres: Alternative metal, nu metal
- Length: 45:39
- Labels: Razor & Tie, Metal Blade
- Producers: Daniel Salcido, Nonpoint

Nonpoint chronology
Nonpoint (2012)	The Return (2014)	The Poison Red (2016)

Singles from The Return
- 1. "Breaking Skin" Released: August 12, 2014; 2. "Misery" Released: 2015

Professional ratings
Review scores
Source	Rating
Blabbermouth.net	7/10
Cryptic Rock	4/5
MetalSucks	1.5/5 stars
New Noise Magazine	Positive

The Return is the ninth studio album by American nu metal band Nonpoint. It was released on September 30, 2014 in the United States via Razor & Tie and worldwide via Metal Blade Records. "Breaking Skin", the first single from the album, was released on August 12, 2014.

The album entered the Billboard 200 charts at No. 38, making it their highest charting album to date with approximately 8,125 copies sold during its first week of release. It has sold 27,000 copies in the United States as of June 2016.

== Track listing ==
No.	Title	Length
1.	"Pins and Needles"	4:18
2.	"Breaking Skin"	2:55
3.	"Razors"	3:21
4.	"Misery"	3:09
5.	"The Return"	4:03
6.	"Take Apart This World"	3:35
7.	"Forcing Hands"	3:35
8.	"Goodbye Letters"	3:13
9.	"Never Ending Hole"	3:10
10.	"Widowmaker"	4:22
11.	"Never Cared Before"	3:29
12.	"F**K'D"	3:02
13.	"Know Myself"	3:32
Total length:		45:39

== Personnel ==
The band's new album titled The Return was released on September 30, 2014. Also Nonpoint released the song "Breaking Skin" as the album's lead single on August 12, 2014. BC Kochmit (Eye Empire, Switched) took over Nonpoint's lead guitar duties following the removal of Dave Lizzio.

Members

- Elias Soriano – lead vocals
- Robb "El Martillo" Rivera - drums
- Rasheed Thomas - rhythm guitar, backing vocals
- Adam Woloszyn - bass
- Dave Lizzio – lead guitar

Production

- Produced by Daniel Salcido & Nonpoint
- Engineered & mixed by Johnny K, at Groovemaster Studios, Chicago, Illinois
- Mastered by Brad Blackwood
- Management by Steve Davis (Davis Entertainment Group)

== Chart performance ==
Chart (2014)	Peak position
US Billboard 200	39
US Independent Albums (Billboard)	5
US Top Alternative Albums (Billboard)	3
US Top Hard Rock Albums (Billboard)	1
US Top Rock Albums (Billboard)	7
