= Development (album) =

Studio album by Nonpoint
- Released: June 25, 2002
- Recorded: October 2001
- Studio: Elysian Fields
- Genre: Nu metal; alternative metal
- Length: 42:54
- Label: MCA
- Producer: Jason Bieler

Nonpoint chronology
Statement (2000)	Development (2002)	Recoil (2004)

Professional ratings
Review scores
Source	Rating
AllMusic	4/5 stars

Development is the third studio album released by American nu metal band Nonpoint. It was their final album released through MCA Records.

The album debuted at No. 52 on the Billboard 200 album chart. The single, "Your Signs", hit No. 29 on Billboard's Active Rock chart, and No. 35 on the Mainstream Rock Airplay chart, both in early July.

== Critical reception ==
AllMusic wrote that the album "finds the band literally developing its own signature sound, in the process refining its scope to a much sharper point."

== Track listing ==
Tracks 1–12 by Nonpoint.

No.	Title	Length
1.	"Development"	3:27
2.	"Circles"	3:30
3.	"Your Signs"	3:29
4.	"Normal Days"	4:04
5.	"My Own Sake"	3:36
6.	"Hands"	4:01
7.	"Excessive Reaction"	2:51
8.	"Mountains"	4:05
9.	"Any Advice?"	3:29
10.	"Hide and Seek"	3:05
11.	"Get Inside"	2:54
12.	"Mint"	4:24

Special edition
No.	Title	Length
13.	"Evil Ways" (Willie Bobo cover)	2:21

== Personnel ==
Members

- Elias Soriano - lead vocals
- Robbie Rivera - drums
- Ken "K. Bastard" MacMillan - bass
- Andrew Goldman - guitars, backing vocals

Production

- Produced by Jason Bieler & Nonpoint
- Engineered by Keith Rose and Chad Milosevich
- Mixed by Bob Clearmountin, at Mix This Studios, Pacific Palisades, California
- Mastered by Mike Fuller
- Drum tech: Tony R. Adams
- A&R by Gary Ashley, Hans Haedelt & Jeanne Venton
- Photo by Matt Swig
