= Miracle (Nonpoint song) =

Single by Nonpoint featuring Chad Gray

from the album Miracle
- Released: February 15, 2010
- Recorded: 2010
- Length: 3:43
- Label: Rocket Science/RED
- Songwriter: Elias Soriano
- Producers: Nonpoint; Chad Gray; Greg Tribbett

Nonpoint featuring Chad Gray singles chronology
"Hands Off" (2008)	"Miracle" (2010)	"Frontlines" (2010)

"Miracle" is a song by the American nu metal band Nonpoint, released as the first single from their sixth studio album, Miracle. The song was released to alternative and active rock radio stations on February 15, 2010. It was also made available for download on iTunes and other online music retailers on March 30. It features Chad Gray of Mudvayne fame contributing vocals during the song's chorus.

== Meaning ==
Elias Soriano explained the meaning of the song saying "I wrote this song as a gigantic 'Fuck You' to all those that doubted this band's will and perseverance. It's for all the naysayers that tried to lead us into defeat, and the fans that have stood behind us for over ten years. It set the tone for the whole record. We're here to wage war on the airwaves, and to stop us is going to take a fucking miracle."

== Music video ==
The song video was directed by Dale "Rage" Resteghini, whose credits include videos for Anthrax, Fall Out Boy, Lil Wayne, The Game, Busta Rhymes, Soulja Boy, and many others. Rage says, "Elias Soriano and I have known each other for a number of years but never had the chance to work together. When he sent me 'Miracle', I was blown away as I think this is one of, if not the best song Nonpoint has ever recorded.

== Charts ==
Chart (2010)	Peak position
US Mainstream Rock (Billboard)	19
US Rock Songs (Billboard)	44
