= Frontlines (song) =

Single by Nonpoint

from the album Miracle
- Released: August 10, 2010
- Recorded: 2010
- Genre: Hard rock, alternative metal
- Length: 3:29
- Label: Rocket Science/RED
- Songwriter: Elias Soriano
- Producers: Nonpoint; Chad Gray; Greg Tribbett

Nonpoint singles chronology
"Miracle" (2010)	"Frontlines" (2010)	"Crazy" (2011)

"Frontlines" is a song by American nu metal band Nonpoint, released as the second single from their sixth studio album, Miracle. The song impacted alternative and active rock radio stations on August 10, 2010. Lead singer Elias Soriano said, "'Frontlines' is for our country's armed forces. They risk their lives every day to protect the rights, liberties and lives of people whose names they don't even know."

In the wake of the COVID-19 pandemic in 2020, Nonpoint would rework this song acoustically as "Remember Me (A Frontlines Tribute)" with a music video supporting healthcare workers and first responders on the front lines of the pandemic.

== Song meaning ==
"After hours of looking at photos online of soldiers, solely for the sake of a picture to be worked into the artwork of the release of "Frontlines" I was so moved and inspired by the commitment, not to mention the emotional and physical risk our soldiers take for strangers every day, that I had to create this as a reminder. We are blessed that we are protected by such strong hearts." - Elias Soriano

== Music video ==
The official music video premiered on MTV2 on September 23. In addition, Nonpoint's frontman, Elias Soriano, made a viral video and the band released it on their YouTube channel in August, a month and a half before the release of the official music video.
