= Struggle (Nonpoint album) =

Studio album by Nonpoint
- Released: May 18, 1999
- Recorded: 1998
- Studio: Studio 13, Deerfield Beach, Florida
- Genres: Nu metal; rap metal
- Length: 48:57
- Label: Jugular Records
- Producer: Jeremy Staska

Nonpoint chronology
Separate Yourself (1997)	Struggle (1999)	Statement (2000)

Struggle is the debut studio album by American nu metal band Nonpoint. It was released through the now defunct independent label Jugular Records.

Several of the songs were later re-used on the band's next album, Statement. The album was originally released independently as Separate Yourself in 1997 with a different track listing. Although the same mixes are used between both releases, a number of songs are exclusive to each. There is no edition which contains every known song from the album sessions. Although the album was reissued again under the original name, but with the suffix "The Beginning 1997–1998" added on, the track-listing for this release is the same as the first reissue and does not feature the songs exclusive to Separate Yourself.

== Reception ==
Professional ratings
Review scores
Source	Rating
AllMusic	3/5 stars

AllMusic wrote: "Melding funk and hardcore with their own vision of what rapmetal should sound like, Nonpoint managed to create a sound that isn't readily comparable to other groups."

== Track listings ==
Struggle track listing
No.	Title	Length
1.	"Mindtrip"	5:24
2.	"The Piper"	3:38
3.	"Senses"	3:48
4.	"Victim"	3:59
5.	"H.I.V.E."	5:27
6.	"Struggle"	4:42
7.	"My Words... What For?"	3:07
8.	"Doublestacked"	6:20
9.	"Clown Sex"	1:26

Reissue
No.	Title	Length
1.	"Preface"	1:35
2.	"Mindtrip"	3:48
3.	"Hive"	5:35
4.	"Double Stacked"	6:26
5.	"Senses"	3:51
6.	"Years"	3:55
7.	"Victim"	4:00
8.	"No Say"	4:00
9.	"Struggle"	4:43
10.	"Two Tone"	3:31
11.	"The Piper"	3:39
12.	"Gimmick"	4:00

== Personnel ==
Members

- Elias Soriano – vocals
- Robb Rivera – drums
- Dru – guitar
- Ken "K. Bastard" MacMillan – bass guitar

Production

- Recorded by Jeremy Staska @ Studio 13
