= Nonpoint (album) =

Studio album by Nonpoint
- Released: October 9, 2012
- Recorded: Groovemaster Studios (Chicago)
- Genre: Alternative metal, nu metal
- Length: 39:10
- Label: Razor & Tie
- Producer: Johnny K, Brian Virtue

Nonpoint chronology
Miracle (2010)	Nonpoint (2012)	The Return (2014)

Singles from Nonpoint
- 1. "Left for You" Released: June 28, 2012; 2. "That Day" Released: May 21, 2013

Nonpoint is the eighth studio album by American nu metal band Nonpoint, released on October 9, 2012 via Razor & Tie. It was produced and engineered by Johnny K (Disturbed, Staind, Sevendust) at Groovemaster Studios in Chicago, Illinois. In June 2012, the band released two songs from the album, "I Said It" and "Left for You", the latter of which serves as the album's lead single. This is the first album to feature guitarists Rasheed Thomas and Dave Lizzio, and bassist Adam Woloszyn.

== Recording and production ==
The album was produced/mixed by producer Johnny K at Groovemaster Studios in Chicago, Illinois, and features additional production and mixing from Brian Virtue features new lineup and label. Soriano explains the new album, "We wanted this record to be a punch in the face. There was a lot of stuff I wanted to artistically vent about. It's a fresh start for us. We felt like having a self-titled record says it all. We hit the reset button, and there's life again. You can hear it musically. We're not going anywhere." "This album is the beginning of a brand new chapter in the world of NONPOINT... rejuvenated and full of positivity," adds Rivera. "Elias has written his most personal lyrics yet that shows the signs of endurance this band has had in our 15-year career."

== Reception ==
Professional ratings
Review scores
Source	Rating
AllMusic	2.5/5 stars

Eduardo Rivadavia of AllMusic gave the album a mixed review and has compared its sound to contemporary post-grunge bands such as Nickelback and 3 Doors Down, writing "Nonpoint's eponymous seventh album sees them moving ever closer to the corporate rock of Nickelback or 3 Doors Down, which may seem like a long way removed from their Floridian nu-metal roots alongside Limp Bizkit, Cold, and other musical crimes against humanity."

== Track listing ==
No.	Title	Length
1.	"Lights, Camera, Action"	3:13
2.	"The Way I See Things"	3:23
3.	"I Said It"	2:42
4.	"Left for You"	2:59
5.	"International Crisis"	3:29
6.	"Another Mistake"	3:36
7.	"That Day"	3:30
8.	"Pandora's Box"	3:04
9.	"Go Time"	2:56
10.	"Independence Day"	3:15
11.	"Temper"	3:08
12.	"Ashes"	3:55
Total length:		39:10

iTunes bonus track version
No.	Title	Length
13.	"I Said It" (Advance Mix)	2:39
14.	"Reborn"	3:16

Best Buy exclusive version
No.	Title	Length
13.	"Another Mistake" (Acoustic)	3:27
14.	"I Said It" (Alternate Mix)	2:39
15.	"Left for You" (Acoustic)	3:23
16.	"Bonus DVD" (Live in South Florida)

== Personnel ==
Members

- Elias Soriano - lead vocals
- Robb Rivera - drums
- Rasheed Thomas - rhythm guitar, backing vocals
- Adam Woloszyn - bass
- Dave Lizzio - lead guitar, backing vocals

Production

- Produced and mixed by Johnny K and Brian Virtue at Groovemaster Studios, Chicago, Illinois
- Engineered by John Karkazis, Brian Virtue, Matt Dougherty, Daniel Salcido and Jeremy Nolan
- Mastered by Brad Blackwood
- Additional composer: Rob Graves
- Booking by Dan Devita and Andrew Goodfriend
- A&R by Pete Giberga
- Artwork and design by Jeff Chenault
- Photo by Ryan Baker
