= Vengeance (Nonpoint album) =

Studio album by Nonpoint
- Released: November 6, 2007
- Recorded: 2006–2007
- Genre: Nu metal
- Length: 43:48
- Label: Bieler Bros.
- Producers: Nonpoint, Matt LaPlant

Nonpoint chronology
To the Pain (2005)	Vengeance (2007)	Miracle (2010)

Vengeance is the sixth studio album by American nu metal band Nonpoint. It debuted No. 129 on the Billboard 200 charts.

The first single from the album, "March of War", was released via Nonpoint's MySpace page. The band shortly thereafter added a sample of the opening track off the album, "Wake Up World". A remix of the eleventh track from the album, titled "Everybody Down", is featured in the video game WWE Smackdown vs. Raw 2008.

Guitarist and founding member Andrew Goldman left Nonpoint nearly a year after this album's release.

== Track listing ==
All tracks are written by Nonpoint.

No.	Title	Length
1.	"Wake Up World"	3:26
2.	"What I Do Best"	3:23
3.	"Vengeance"	2:55
4.	"Bring Me Down"	3:46
5.	"March of War"	4:16
6.	"Breathe"	5:03
7.	"Hands Off"	3:40
8.	"A Way Out"	3:32
9.	"Change Your Mind"	3:42
10.	"Witness"	3:45
11.	"Everybody Down"	3:18
12.	"When It's Over"	3:02
Total length:		43:48
