= Recoil (album) =

Studio album by Nonpoint
- Released: August 3, 2004
- Recorded: 2004
- Genre: Nu metal
- Length: 55:51
- Label: Lava
- Producer: Jason Bieler; Nonpoint

Nonpoint chronology
Development (2002)	Recoil (2004)	To the Pain (2005)

Singles from Recoil
- 1. "The Truth" Released: 2004; 2. "In the Air Tonight" Released: 2004; 3. "Rabia" Released: 2004

Professional ratings
Review scores
Source	Rating
AllMusic	3.5/5 stars
Rolling Stone	3/5 stars

Recoil is the fourth studio album released by American nu metal band Nonpoint. It was their only release through Lava Records.

The album debuted No. 115 on the Billboard 200 charts.

== Track listing ==
All tracks are written by Nonpoint, except "In the Air Tonight", written by Phil Collins.

No.	Title	Length
1.	"The Same"	2:58
2.	"The Truth"	4:02
3.	"Broken Bones"	2:53
4.	"Wait"	3:01
5.	"Rabia"	4:16
6.	"Done It Anyway"	3:22
7.	"In the Air Tonight" (Phil Collins cover)	4:31
8.	"Move Now"	3:19
9.	"Peace of Mind"	3:34
10.	"Past It All"	3:43
11.	"Impossible Needs"	3:34
12.	"Side with the Guns"	2:58
13.	"Reward/Past It All (Acoustic Version)"	13:42
Total length:		73:11

=== Notes ===
- The album also contains 14 tracks if you count the acoustic version of "Past It All" at the end of track 13.
- Track 5, "Rabia", translates to "Rage", is sung entirely in Spanish, but the lyrics in the disc's booklet are printed in English.
- Track 7, "In the Air Tonight", is a cover of the Phil Collins hit song and was featured in the 2006 film Miami Vice.
- Track 13, "Reward", is 4:00 in length, "Past It All", is 3:39 in length. "Past It All" begins 9:54 into track 13. 954 is the telephone area code of Ft. Lauderdale, FL - Nonpoint's hometown.

== Personnel ==
Nonpoint

- Elias Soriano – vocals
- Andrew Goldman – guitar, vocals
- Ken "KB" MacMillan – bass
- Robb Rivera – drums, percussion

Technical personnel

- Jason Bieler – producer, mixing, engineer
- Nonpoint – producer
- Andrew Goldman – mixing, engineer
- Mark "Cheeseboy" Krieg – studio technician
- Mike Fuller – mastering
