= Switched (band) =

American nu metal band

- Also known as: Sw1tched; Sw1tch (formerly)
- Origin: Cleveland, Ohio, U.S.
- Genres: Nu metal
- Years active: 1999–2010
- Labels: Immortal; Corporate Punishment

Switched (previously depicted as Sw1tched) was an American nu metal band from Cleveland, Ohio.

== History ==
Forming in 1999 as Sw1tch, the band played shows around Ohio and released a demo entitled Fuckin' Demo. The songs "Anymore", "Wrongside", "Inside", "Darkening Days", "Last Chance", and "Skins", which appear in their demo versions on this CD, went on to appear on the Subject to Change album. This demo was later re-released on disc two of the "Ghosts in the Machine" album in 2006. Since a funk band already had rights to the name Switch, the band had to change their name to Sw1tched, and was later signed to Immortal/Virgin Records. After recording all of the bass for the Subject to Change album, bassist Shawn May left the band for unknown reasons, and was replaced by Chimaira drum tech Jason French. French did play bass on one song on the album, though, since the band re-recorded the song "Walk Away" before the album was released.

Switched rose to prominence playing at popular festivals such as Ozzfest in 2002 and on the Vans Warped Tour in 2001 and 2002. Their debut album titled, Subject to Change was released via Immortal/Virgin Records in 2002, and went on to sell over 100,000 records worldwide.

In mid-2003, the group severed ties with both their label Immortal Records and their former management team. Bassist Jason French was replaced by former Stuck Mojo and Stereomud bassist Corey Lowery, who would eventually leave the band to join Dark New Day. During the recording phase for their second album, they had planned to adopt a new name, Sky Fall Down, by January 2004 – a reflection on the new direction the band was taking. Instead, the band went on a two-year hiatus, with several members of the band moving on to other projects.

Former bassist Shawn May, who had left the band in 2001 prior to the release of "Subject to Change", started a custom bass shop in Michigan. Drummer Chad Szeliga joined Leo in 2004 and then later joined popular post-grunge group Breaking Benjamin in 2005. Bassist Corey Lowery helped form alternative metal group Dark New Day, and later formed Eye Empire. Lead guitarist B.C. Kochmit joined then left hard rock group "Rikets" to form his own projects, called "Tinjen", "Shambella", and "My Alter-Ego Experiment." He was the lead guitar player in Dark New Day for a short time, and Eye Empire with Lowery and also was a member of the band Nonpoint. Vocalist Ben Schigel found success as a producer working with bands such as Drowning Pool, Chimaira, Breaking Benjamin, Rikets, Bleed the Sky, Solus Deus and Allele.

With help from their first manager, Thom Hazaert, now co-president of Californian indie label, Corporate Punishment Records, the group reformed (with a modified lineup) and released their second album titled, Ghosts in the Machine on January 10, 2006. The two-disc album contains rarities, b-sides and demos. The first disc includes eleven tracks that were intended for the band's second Immortal release, while the second disc includes four live songs plus several demos and the unreleased track "She Blinded Me with Science". The quality of the first disc can be described as "rough" as the tracks weren't yet mastered and still in the demo phase.

A repackaged version of Subject to Change was also released which features the b-side track "Spread", the Howard Benson produced alternate versions of "Walkaway" and "Inside" and the Rick Will mix of "Inside". Two videos for "Inside" are also included.

== Current status ==
Switched declared a second hiatus after Ghosts in the Machine but as of January 2010, according to Ben Schigel, there are no plans to continue with Sw1tched. Ben Schigel currently works as a producer at Spider Studios in Olmsted Falls, Ohio. He has produced bands such as Ringworm, Chimaira, Bleed The Sky and Solus Deus; just to name a few.

Bassist Corey Lowery and guitarist B.C. Kochmit have since formed hard rock supergroup Eye Empire with solo artist Dixie Duncan and former members of Submersed singer Donald Carpenter and drummer Garrett Whitlock. Lowery has also been a member of the bands Saint Asonia and Seether.

Ben Schigel produces bands at his Spider Studio. He also plays drums for pop rock band SomeKindaWonderful.

== Band members ==
Last known lineup

- Ben Schigel – vocals
- B.C. Kochmit – guitar, vocals
- Joe Schigel – guitar
- Joshua Jansen – bass
- Angel Bartolotta – drums

=== Former members ===
- Corey Lowery – bass
- Chris Nelson – guitar
- Jason French – bass
- Shawn May – bass
- Chad Szeliga – drums

== Discography ==
| Release date | Title | Label |
|---|---|---|
| 2000 | Fuckin' Demo | Independently released |
| 2001 | Spread Your E.P. | Immortal Records |
| 2002 | Inside EP | Immortal Records |
| February 26, 2002 | Subject to Change | Immortal Records |
| January 10, 2006 | Subject to Change (re-release) | Corporate Punishment |
| January 10, 2006 | Ghosts in the Machine | Corporate Punishment |
