= Bullet with a Name =

Single by Nonpoint

from the album To the Pain
- Released: June 2005
- Genre: Nu metal
- Length: 3:26
- Label: Bieler Bros.
- Songwriter: Nonpoint
- Producer: Andrew Goldman

Nonpoint singles chronology
"Rabia" (2004)	"Bullet with a Name" (2005)	"Alive and Kicking" (2006)

"Bullet with a Name" is a song by American nu metal band Nonpoint. The song is the opening track on the band's fourth studio album To the Pain and was released as the album's first single. The song is one of Nonpoint's most popular tracks and is usually played as the band's closing song when performed live.

"Bullet with a Name" peaked at #22 on the Billboard Mainstream Rock chart on March 11, 2006.

== Music video ==
The song's music video was directed by Darren Doane.

== Use in other media ==
"Bullet with a Name" was included on the soundtrack for the 2006 video game WWE SmackDown vs. Raw 2007. The song was featured in the 2007 film The Condemned, but did not appear on the film's soundtrack. Former CZW wrestler and the late Brain Damage used the song as his entrance music during his time in Combat Zone Wrestling.

== Charts ==
Chart (2006)	Peak position
US Mainstream Rock (Billboard)	22

== Personnel ==
- Elias Soriano – lead vocals
- Andrew Goldman – guitars, backing vocals
- Ken MacMillan – bass
- Robb Rivera – drums
