= Miracle (Nonpoint album) =

Studio album by Nonpoint
- Released: May 4, 2010
- Recorded: Late 2009
- Genre: Alternative metal, nu metal
- Length: 54:17
- Label: 954 Records / Rocket Science Ventures
- Producer: Nonpoint, Chad Gray, Greg Tribbett

Nonpoint chronology
Vengeance (2007)	Miracle (2010)	Nonpoint (2012)

Singles from Miracle
- 1. "Miracle" Released: February 15, 2010; 2. "Frontlines" Released: August 10, 2010; 3. "Crazy" Released: February 2011

Professional ratings
Review scores
Source	Rating
AllMusic	3/5 stars
Louder	3.5/5 stars
PopMatters	7/10

Miracle is the seventh studio album by American nu metal band Nonpoint, released on May 4, 2010. It was released in Europe on June 14 via Powerage Records.

The album's title track serves as its first single. This is the only Nonpoint album to feature guitarist Zach Broderick, who joined the band in late 2008 following the departure of original member Andrew Goldman, and the last to feature founding bassist Ken MacMillan. The album was recorded in Racine, Wisconsin and was produced by Mudvayne members Chad Gray and Greg Tribbett.

The album debuted No. 59 on the Billboard 200 chart. It is the second highest debut of the band's career. It also landed at No. 5 on the Rock Albums chart in its first week of release.

It was announced in February 2010 that the album was to be released on April 27, 2010; however, it was delayed and was announced on March 10, that the release date would be on May 4, 2010.

== Track listing ==
All lyrics are written by Elias Soriano; all music is composed by Nonpoint except "5 Minutes Alone" by Pantera.

No.	Title	Length
1.	"Shadow"	3:29
2.	"Miracle" (featuring Chad Gray)	3:44
3.	"Crazy"	3:34
4.	"Frontlines"	3:29
5.	"Looking Away"	3:00
6.	"Electricity"	2:40
7.	"What You've Got for Me"	3:31
8.	"Throwing Stones"	3:56
9.	"5 Minutes Alone" (Pantera cover)	5:48
10.	"What I've Become"	3:23
11.	"Dangerous Waters"	3:28
12.	"Lucky #13"	3:25
13.	"Dead Soul" (contained as a hidden track starting at 9:54 of "Lucky #13")	4:19

Powerage Records release bonus tracks

No.	Title	Length
13.	"What a Day (Acoustic)"
14.	"Circles (Acoustic)"
15.	"Rabia (Acoustic)"

== Personnel ==
Members

- Elias Soriano – lead vocals
- Robb Rivera – drums, percussion
- Ken Charman – bass, backing vocals
- Zach Broderick – guitars

Production

- Nonpoint – producer
- Chad Gray – producer
- Greg Tribbett – producer
- Chris Wisco – engineer
- Jeremy Parker – mixing
- Dave McNair – mastering
- James Rochette – drum technician
- Brian Porizek – art direction, package design
- Ty Watkins – band photo
