= Nonpoint =

American metal band

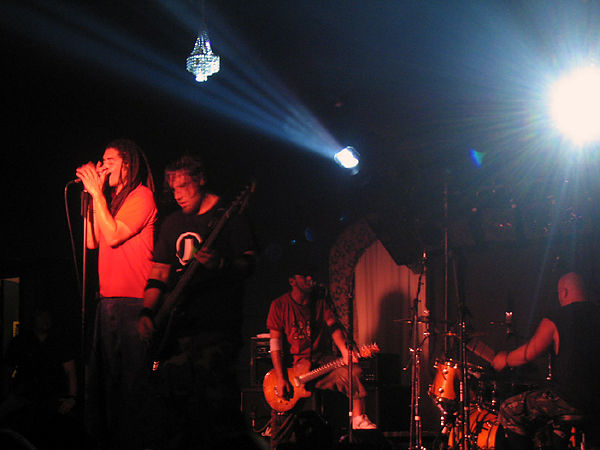
- Nonpoint performing in 2005

Background information
- Origin: Fort Lauderdale, Florida, U.S.
- Genres: Nu metal; alternative metal; hard rock; groove metal; rap metal
- Years active: 1997–present
- Labels: Bieler; Lava; MCA; Razor & Tie; Metal Blade; Spinefarm
- Members: Elias Soriano; Robb Rivera; Rasheed Thomas; Adam Woloszyn; Jaysin Zeilstra
- Past members: Andrew Goldman; Ken MacMillan; Zach Broderick; Dave Lizzio; B.C. Kochmit
- Website: nonpointstore.com

Nonpoint is an American heavy metal band from Fort Lauderdale, Florida. The band currently consists of vocalist Elias Soriano, drummer Robb Rivera, rhythm guitarist Rasheed Thomas, bassist Adam Woloszyn, and lead guitarist Jaysin Zeilstra.

Nonpoint was formed in 1997 by Rivera and Soriano. They released two independent demo albums in the 1990s, followed by their major label debut album, Statement, in 2000. Over the years, Nonpoint released numerous albums, with their most recent, X, released in 2018. The band has toured extensively and has had their music featured in various video games, movies, and soundtracks. In April 2021, Nonpoint announced the creation of their independent record label, 361 Degrees Records.

== History ==
=== Early years (1997–2004) ===
During the early 1990s, drummer Robb Rivera formed a band named Nonpoint Factor. The band released various demos and its lineup changed numerous times, with Rivera as the only constant member. By 1997, the band's name was shortened to simply "Nonpoint", and the lineup was restructured with Rivera on drums, Elias Soriano on vocals, Ken MacMillan on bass, and Andrew Goldman on guitar. The name Nonpoint came from a Believer song named "Nonpoint". Soriano recalls: "I dug the name so I started using it around that time. It has no real meaning to us. It has something to do with pollution, but to us it just sounded cool." The band self-released their first independent album, Separate Yourself, in late 1997. Another independent album, Struggle, was released on May 18, 1999, on the now-defunct Jugular Records.

The band released their debut major label album Statement on October 10, 2000, via MCA Records. To promote the album, as well as the band on a nationwide scale, Nonpoint toured with such artists as Hed PE, Mudvayne, Fuel, Taproot, and Drowning Pool, with their main tour appearing on the United States leg of the 2001 Ozzfest tour. A year after its release, the album entered the Billboard 200 charts, where it peaked at No. 166. The first single from the album, "What a Day", peaked at No. 24 on the Mainstream Rock charts.

Nonpoint's second album Development was released on June 25, 2002. The album entered the Billboard charts at No. 52, with the first single released from the album, "Your Signs", peaking at No. 36 on the Mainstream Rock charts. Nonpoint completed a successful second appearance at Ozzfest, during the Donington Park leg of the European tour. Other tours included Sevendust on the first Locobazooka tour, dates with Filter, Sunset Black, and Papa Roach. A second single, "Circles", was featured in NASCAR Thunder 2003, as well as the soundtrack for Hot Wheels AcceleRacers.

Two years after the release of Development, Nonpoint released their third major album Recoil on August 3, 2004, via their new label Lava Records. The album entered the Billboard charts at No. 115. The album's first single, "The Truth", peaked at No. 22 on the Mainstream Rock charts. Another single, "Rabia" was later released.

=== Middle years (2005–2009) ===
After departing from Lava Records, Nonpoint signed with independent label Bieler Bros. Records. The label's co-owner, Jason Bieler, produced the band's previous three albums. Nonpoint re-emerged with their fourth major album To the Pain on November 8, 2005. The album entered the Billboard charts at No. 147, with approximately 9,000 copies sold during its first week of release. The single, "Bullet with a Name", peaked at No. 22 on the Mainstream Rock charts and was featured on the game WWE SmackDown vs. Raw 2007 and 2007 film The Condemned. The album's second single, "Alive and Kicking", peaked at No. 25. The song was also featured on the game WWE SmackDown vs. Raw 2007. "In the Air Tonight", which was previously featured on the Recoil album, was the theme song for the Miami Vice movie. It made a belated appearance on the Mainstream Rock charts, peaking at No. 34. Beginning in late 2005, Nonpoint toured extensively with Sevendust for three months, later concluding the tour in New Hampshire. Nonpoint toured on the third annual Music as a Weapon Tour with Disturbed, Stone Sour and Flyleaf. The band also did tours with Sevendust and Buckcherry.

Nonpoint released a CD and DVD set, Live and Kicking, on November 7, 2006. The live album was recorded at the band's April 29, 2006, show in Fort Lauderdale, Florida. The album sold 3,475 copies during its first week of release.

As of 2019, To the Pain has sold over 130,000 copies in the United States.

On November 6, 2007, Nonpoint released their fifth major album, Vengeance, under Bieler Bros. Records. The album sold 8,400 copies in the first week. Vengeance peaked at 129th on the Billboard charts. The first single, "March of War", was released early on the band's Myspace page, as well as a sample of the lead track "Wake Up World". For the second year in a row one of their songs was featured in the franchise of WWE SmackDown vs. Raw 2008. The song was a remix of "Everybody Down" from the album.

They went on the first ever Great American Rampage Tour. Nonpoint headlined the What Does Not Kill You tour with 12 Stones and Anew Revolution. The band announced that in February 2009 they would embark on a tour with Mudvayne and In This Moment.

On January 20, 2009, drummer Robb Rivera announced that the band had parted ways with Bieler Bros. and were seeking a new label and management. Nonpoint later signed on with Split Media LLC.

Nonpoint recorded demos in Phoenix in May 2009. Nonpoint released a new acoustic EP digitally through their own label, 954 Records, on December 8. Dubbed, Cut The Cord, the outing features acoustic renditions of "What a Day", "Circles", "Rabia", "Victim", and "Your Signs".

Nonpoint streamed a cover of Pantera's "5 Minutes Alone" on their MySpace. The track is a bonus track for the Metal Hammer magazine tribute to "Dimebag" Darrell Abbott which was made available on December 16. The Pantera cover was later featured on their sixth studio album, Miracle.

=== Recent years (2010–present) ===
The band started work on their sixth studio album in late 2009, with plans to release it early to mid-2010. In February 2010, they released the first single and title track off the new album, "Miracle", along with a release date of April 27. About a month later, the release was pushed back a week to May 4.

At the time of its release, Miracle was No. 59 on the Billboard 200, the second highest debut of the band's career, also reaching No. 5 on the Rock Albums chart in the week following the release. The second single, "Frontlines", was released in August, and was inspired by the military and their daily risk-taking to protect the United States.

During late February and early March, the band performed at Soundwave in Australia. This marked the first time the band had played there in their career. They also released a free download of their cover of Michael Jackson's "Billie Jean".

The Icon compilation—part of a series released by the label with other artists—spanned the band's earlier major label work and included a number of rarities, including an acoustic version of their song "What a Day", plus the rare songs "Across The Line" and "Pickle". The set surfaced through UMG on April 5. The song "Across the Line" made its appearance in NASCAR Thunder 2004 before appearing in the greatest hits album.

The band stated that they had been writing new music and that they planned to start recording a new album at the end of the year through Razor & Tie. They released a free advanced mix of a song off the album titled "I Said It". Another track, "Left for You", was later released.

It was confirmed through Nonpoint's Facebook page that they would be recording for a DVD when they play their show in their hometown on May 8.

Nonpoint completed the recording process for their self-titled seventh studio album with producer Johnny K. The band released the song "I Said It", and made plans to tour with Call Me No One.

The band later announced that the album would be released on September 18, 2012. It was pushed to October 9, 2012. Nonpoint released a music video for Left For You on October 1, 2012.

In early January 2014, Nonpoint announced on Facebook that they were working on a new album: "Update. We are writing a new album. Really blown away with what we have done so far. If you liked the last album then you will dig this new stuff. From what I can hear we are digging deeper into our influences. Really exciting."

Nonpoint signed with Metal Blade Records for areas outside of North America. They remain signed to Razor & Tie for North American releases.

The band's new album titled The Return was released on September 30, 2014. Also Nonpoint released the song "Breaking Skin" as the album's lead single on August 12, 2014. Not long after the album's release, BC Kochmit (Eye Empire, Switched) took over Dave Lizzio's role as Nonpoint's lead guitarist.

While playing a show at Amos Southend in Charlotte, North Carolina on the Crack the Sky tour with 10 Years, the band revealed they had begun work on their ninth studio album and that they would enter begin recording in February 2016. It was announced on October 15, 2015, that the band had signed with Spinefarm Records. In early May the band announced the 14-track album and the first song, "Generation Idiot" via their official Facebook page. The Poison Red was released on July 8, 2016. Nonpoint revealed plans to take a hiatus from touring in 2018.

The band's tenth album, X, was released on August 24, 2018. The band released a lyric video for the song "Dodge Your Destiny" on June 22 while simultaneously releasing "Chaos and Earthquakes" as the first radio single, with an official video for the latter premiering on the band's YouTube channel on August 16.

In April 2021, Nonpoint announced that they had created their own independent record label called 361 Degrees Records.

In early 2026 the band announced spring US tour dates with Soil and Sumo Cyco, dubbed the "Outta Control Tour". They also teased new music during this time. The band are also confirmed to be making an appearance at Welcome to Rockville, which will take place in Daytona Beach, Florida in May 2026.

On September 18, 2026, Nonpoint released a new album named The Last Word, the first released under 361 Degrees Records.

== Musical style and influences ==
Nonpoint have been described as nu metal, alternative metal, hard rock, groove metal, and rap metal. Vocalist Elias Soriano views Nonpoint both as a metal band and a rock band, elaborating, "We don't try to pigeonhole ourselves."

Originally playing an aggressive style, Nonpoint moved to more melodic sounds with their 2002 album Development, due to pressure from their record label MCA. The 2004 album Recoil marked a return to the band's heavier roots. In a 2000 interview, Soriano reflected on the band's musical influences, stating "We all have a lot of separate influences. My drummer comes from a more metal/hardcore background. My bass player is from the straight edge hardcore, Earth Crisis, Hatebreed, stuff like that. My guitar player is really into Stevie Ray Vaughan and blues and a lot of industrial stuff like Nine Inch Nails. Me personally, I grew up on a lot of R&B, a lot of rap. I'm into that smooth, soulful sound." The band's self-titled album "[added] a dash of post-grunge to the mix," according to AllMusic.

Nonpoint frequently use frog symbolism (specifically that of the coquí, a group of several species native to Puerto Rico) on their album covers, as well as in vocal samples in Development.

== Band members ==
Current members

- Elias Soriano – lead vocals (1997–present)
- Robb Rivera – drums (1997–present)
- Rasheed Thomas – rhythm guitar, backing vocals (2011–present)
- Adam Woloszyn – bass (2011–present)
- Jaysin Zeilstra – lead guitar, backing vocals (2019–present)

Former members

- Andrew Goldman – guitars, backing vocals (1997–2008)
- Ken MacMillan – bass, backing vocals (1997–2011)
- Zach Broderick – lead guitar (2008–2011)
- Dave Lizzio – lead guitar, backing vocals (2011–2014)
- B.C. Kochmit – lead guitar, backing vocals (2014–2019)

Timeline

== Discography ==
- Statement (2000)
- Development (2002)
- Recoil (2004)
- To the Pain (2005)
- Vengeance (2007)
- Miracle (2010)
- Nonpoint (2012)
- The Return (2014)
- The Poison Red (2016)
- X (2018)
- The Last Word (2026)
