= Corporate Punishment Records =

American independent record label

- Founded: 2004
- Founder: Thom Hazaert, Eric Nielsen
- Distributor: Trustkill Records/Universal Music
- Genre: Heavy metal; rock; punk; alternative rock
- Country of origin: U.S.
- Location: Los Angeles, California
- Official website: corporatepunishment.com

Corporate Punishment Records (abbreviated CPR) is a Los Angeles–based independent record label. The company was formed in 2004 by Thom Hazaert and Eric Nielsen, also co-founders of Loudside.com and Total Assault Street Teams. The label's most prominent artists include David Reilly of God Lives Underwater, Trigger Point, Switched, Allele, Ghost Machine, and Amity Lane.

== History ==
CPR was formed in 2004 by Thom Hazaert and Eric Nielsen, who were also the co-founders of Loudside.com – a comprehensive music and entertainment site, and the Total Assault Street Teams. Their previous work with artists including Chimaira, Depswa, Switched, Korn, Limp Bizkit, Staind, The Used, Cold, Glassjaw, My Chemical Romance, Hed PE and Nine Inch Nails, amongst others, helped lay the foundation of the label.

Corporate Punishment was distributed by The Navarre Corporation in America, and Universal Music in Canada, until Navarre was purchased by E1/Koch, who became the label's distributor until 2008. After being released from their distribution deal with E1, the label went on hiatus until January 2010 when it was announced that Corporate Punishment had signed a Worldwide distribution deal with Trustkill Records. Shortly thereafter, it was announced the label went on hiatus, and Hazaert went on to form the INgrooves/Fontana distributed THC : MUSIC.

== Roster ==
=== Current ===
- 3 Mile Scream
- Allele
- Amity Lane
- Broken Teeth
- Dangerous Toys
- Defiance
- Kïll Cheerleadër
- On A Pale Horse
- N3V3R 3N0U6H
- Onesidezero
- Pain Principle
- The Penny Royals
- Re:Ignition
- Tinjen
- Years of Fire
- Divided By Zero
- 9mm Solution
- My Downfall
- Invent the Dark
- Victory Pill

=== Past ===
- AM Conspiracy
- David Reilly
- KCUF
- Mastery
- Nobis
- Rikets
- Shenoah
- Ghost Machine
- Silent Civilian
- Sinkin' Ships
- Trigger Point
- Hydrovibe
- Switched

== See also ==
- List of record labels
