= Bradley Kochmit =

American musician

Bradley "B.C." Kochmit is an American musician, best known as the former lead guitarist for Nonpoint, also known for being in Dark New Day and Eye Empire. He was once the guitarist for Switched.

In 2008, Kochmit left Switched to replace Troy McLawhorn in Dark New Day,

== Violent Plan ==
In June 2009, it was announced that both Corey Lowery and Kochmit had formed a new group called Violent Plan with singer Donnie Hamby of doubleDrive, and drummer Dan Richardson, of Pro-Pain, Crumbsuckers, Life of Agony and Stereomud, completing a nine-song demo. This group was short lived and by November 2009 had disbanded.

== Eye Empire ==
In October 2009, Kochmit helped form Eye Empire along with Corey Lowery, Donald Carpenter, and Garrett Whitlock.
