= Vanishing Acts =

2005 novel by Jodi Picoult

- First edition
- Author: Jodi Picoult
- Language: English
- Genre: Family saga novel
- Publisher: Atria Books
- Publication date: 2005
- Publication place: United States
- Pages: 418
- ISBN: 9780743267649
- OCLC: 56617337

Vanishing Acts (2005) is the twelfth novel by the American author Jodi Picoult. The novel is set in rural New Hampshire, and the story focuses on Delia Hopkins, a missing persons' investigator, and her family, including her young daughter, Sophie, her widowed father, Andrew, and her search and rescue bloodhound, Greta.

== Plot ==
Delia Hopkins is a missing persons' investigator, who lives in New Hampshire with her widowed father Andrew and her young daughter Sophie. Delia works with her own search-and-rescue bloodhound to find missing people. Delia is on the verge of marrying Eric, a friend since childhood. Suddenly, she learns that her father has been arrested for her kidnapping as a young child.

== Narrative style ==
Vanishing Acts is narrated through the perspective of five characters, including Delia, Eric, Andrew, and Fitz. Additionally, each character's chapter is given a different font. In the alternating narrative technique each character takes turns narrating events that are unfolding in their lives. Picoult frequently employs this alternating narrative style in her writing, including in My Sister's Keeper, House Rules, Songs of the Humpback Whale, Change of Heart, Handle With Care, Sing You Home, Lone Wolf, and The Storyteller.
