= Small Great Things =

2016 novel by Jodi Picoult

- First edition (US)
- Author: Jodi Picoult
- Language: English
- Genre: Novel
- Published: October 11, 2016
- Publisher: Ballantine Books (US); Hodder & Stoughton (UK)
- Publication place: United States
- Media type: Print (Hardcover and Paperback)
- ISBN: 9780345544971
- Followed by: A Spark of Light

Small Great Things (2016) is the twenty-fifth novel by American author Jodi Picoult. The book focuses on race in America and revolves around the protagonist, a delivery nurse, named Ruth Jefferson. This is Picoult's first novel with an African American protagonist.

== Synopsis ==
The story concentrates on an African-American labor/delivery (L&D) nurse, Ruth Jefferson, in charge of newborns at a fictional Connecticut hospital. Ruth is ordered not to touch or go near the baby of a white supremacist couple. After the baby dies in her care, Ruth is charged with murder, and taken to court.

== Narrative style ==
The story is told from the complex multiple racial perspectives of the principal characters, including the nurse, Ruth, Turk Bauer, the white supremacist father of the baby, and Kennedy McQuarrie, Ruth's attorney. Picoult frequently employs an alternating multi-perspective narrative style in her novels, including My Sister's Keeper, Songs of the Humpback Whale, Sing You Home, Handle With Care, Change of Heart, House Rules, Lone Wolf, and The Storyteller.

== Characters ==
- Ruth Jefferson: A twenty-year employed nurse at Mercy-West Haven Hospital who is accused of murder when an infant dies in her care.
- Edison: Ruth's son.
- Adisa: Ruth's sister.
- Turk Bauer: A white supremacist with swastika tattoos.
- Brittany Bauer ("Brit"): Turk's wife.
- Francis: Brit's father, who is a white supremacist.
- Kennedy: Ruth's public defender.
- Odette Lawton: The prosecutor for Ruth's case, an African-American woman.
- Micah: Kennedy's husband.
- Violet: Kennedy and Micah's daughter.
- Wallace Mercy: A popular televangelist.

=== Minor characters ===
- Sam Hallowell: The man for whose family Ruth's mother works as a domestic servant.
- Rachel: Adisa's birth name, which she changes as a young adult to Adisa.
- Ms. Mina: The woman for whose family Ruth's mother works as a domestic servant.
- Christina: Ms. Mina's daughter. She is around Ruth's age and they are friends.
- Corrine: A nurse who works alongside Ruth.
- Lucille: A nurse who works alongside Ruth.
- Carla: A legal consultant for the hospital where Ruth works.
- Jack DeNardi: An office clerk ("paper pusher") at the hospital, from whom Kennedy "fishes" information.
- Judge "Thunder" Turner: The judge who presides over Ruth's court trials.
- Howard: Kennedy's assistant, helps to form a legal defense for the murder trial of Ruth.
- Marie: Ruth's boss at Mercy-West Haven Hospital.
- Adele: Brit's mother.
- Raine: The man who introduced Turk to white supremacy.

== Critical reception ==
Eleanor Brown of The Washington Post wrote that, "'Small Great Things' is the most important novel Jodi Picoult has ever written. Frank, uncomfortably introspective and right on the day's headlines, it will challenge her readers", although she felt that the book is "overly long, with a meandering middle, a tendency toward melodrama and a rushed ending that feels glib." Whereas, Roxane Gay, writing for the New York Times thought Turk, the white supremacist character, was well-written; though also found that the protagonist and African American character, Ruth, to be the least believable: "The more we see of Ruth and her family, the more their characterization feels like black-people bingo — as if Picoult is working through a checklist of issues in an attempt to say everything about race in one book." Gay found it a "flawed novel" but felt "generous" toward the book and gave her "a lot of credit for trying, and for supporting her attempt with rigorous research, good intentions and an awareness of her fallibility". Gay further wrote: "The novel is messy, but so is our racial climate." The novel also received reviews from BookPage.com and Bookreporter.com. Kirkus Reviews noted negatively of the novel, "After she sets up a world in which racism thoroughly defines every aspect of character and plot, Picoult's conclusion occurs in a separate fairy-tale world where racism suddenly does not exist, resulting in a rather juvenile portrayal of racial politics in America."

== Planned film adaptation ==
In January 2017, it was announced that Amblin Partners acquired the screen rights to Small Great Things for a film adaptation starring Viola Davis and Julia Roberts. Marc Platt and Adam Siegel were named as producers, with the project planned to be put through Amblin's DreamWorks Pictures banner.
