= The Storyteller (Picoult novel) =

2013 novel by Jodi Picoult

First edition (publ. Atria Books)

The Storyteller is the twenty-second novel written by the American author Jodi Picoult.

== Plot ==
25-year-old Sage Singer lives in the small town of Westerbrook, New Hampshire. A couple of years before the story began, Sage and her mother were in a car accident while Sage was driving. Sage's mother was killed in the crash, and Sage was left with a large scar across her cheek, which is a constant reminder that she was responsible for her mother's death. Sage is self-conscious about her facial scar, and chooses to wear her hair across her face in order to hide it. Sage works nights, alone, as a baker, as she believes that she deserves a lonely life. Sage believes that her sisters, Pepper and Saffron, blame her for their mother's death, so she actively avoids contact with them. Her best friend is Mary D'Angelis, an ex-nun who owns Our Daily Bread, the bakery where Sage works. Sage is in a relationship with the local funeral director, Adam, who also happens to be married. Initially, Sage seems to be fine with their arrangement, as it allows her to live independently.

Although Sage's family is deeply Jewish, she refers to herself as an atheist. Sage, recently began attending a grief group, where she meets an elderly man, Josef Weber. Josef is widely known around town for being a kind and generous man. He and his wife lived in Westerbrook for 40 years, though his wife recently died. Josef is seen by many in their town as a model citizen, as he was the long time German teacher at the high school, as well as the baseball coach. After Josef and Sage become close friends, he reveals a secret about his past; he was a Nazi commander in the Holocaust at the Auschwitz concentration camp and asks Sage if she will help him die.

Josef tells Sage that he committed horrific crimes and killed many people. He asks her to help him die by suicide. Sage is conflicted by the request, and after much deliberation, she calls the local police department, and tells them she has discovered a Nazi. Sage is referred to the U.S. Department of Justice, and is directed to Leo Stein, the individual in control of Holocaust-related things in the U.S. Leo, who is immediately attracted to Sage, tells her how difficult it will be to verify that Josef is actually telling the truth, and that it will be exponentially more difficult to convict him of his crimes. Leo is also skeptical of Sage's story as he does not believe that a Nazi would simply confess his crimes 70 years later. Leo investigates "Josef Weber" and finds that no such SS guard by that name existed, but under much coaxing from Sage, Josef confesses his real name was Reiner Hartmann, who was indeed an officer at Auschwitz.

Over time Sage is able to gather bits and pieces of information (photographs, dates, people, places, documents) from Josef and she gives it to Leo. Leo is able to confirm that the information provided by Josef was accurate, though not enough to prove that Josef is who he says he is. In order to prove that Josef is Reiner, Sage must uncover information from Josef that only Reiner would know (such as a confession to some of his personal crimes that nobody else would know about).

Sage's grandmother, Minka, is a Holocaust survivor and was imprisoned at Auschwitz. After much persuading, Leo manages to convince Minka to open up about her past. Minka tells of her time in Poland as a teenager, moving into a ghetto, and then being imprisoned at Auschwitz, as well as how she ultimately survived. Minka begins to explain a story that she began writing in childhood with her best friend Darija and carried on writing throughout her time in Auschwitz. She continued writing as a survival tactic for herself and for those she was imprisoned with. However, an SS guard, known as Franz Hartmann, expressed interest in the story as he believed that it explained the complex relationship he had with his brother. Franz offers Minka small comforts such as warmth and food scraps in exchange for 10 pages of the story each day.

One day, Minka, accompanied by Darija, who had been smuggled into the administration offices to keep warm, catches Franz's cruel older brother Reiner, Franz's superior, stealing money out of the safe that was originally taken from dead prisoners. To prevent Minka from turning him in, Reiner shoots Darija in the face, killing her instantly, and blames Minka for the theft. Minka is promptly sent from Auschwitz to a death march in 1944, which she manages to survive. With Leo and Sage returning the following day with photographs of Nazi generals, Minka is able to positively identify one of the guards as Reiner Hartmann, stating "I would never forget the man that murdered my best friend".

In order to have Josef arrested and extradited, an eyewitness account was needed, something that only Reiner would know, so Sage is sent by Leo to talk to Josef, wearing a wire to record his confession(s). When Sage asks what the worst thing he ever did was, he replies that it was killing Darija, and then blaming Minka for the theft. Josef explains how the bullet was actually meant for Minka, but hit Darija instead as he had an unstable hand. This confession deeply upsets Sage, and having obtained the material she needed, she immediately leaves Josef's house.

Not long after hearing Josef's confession, Sage receives a call saying that Josef is in the hospital from an attempted suicide. Sage begins to ponder her relationship with Adam, after running into him with his arm around his wife in a cafe while she was with Leo. Sage cuts ties with Adam, as she comes to realize that she is not happy being "the other woman". Adam, trying to recover their relationship, goes to Sage's home and proposes, telling her that he is filling for divorce so he can marry her, but she tells him to leave. While Josef is in the hospital, Sage learns that her grandmother Minka has died in her sleep, which Sage blames herself for, as she thinks that making her discuss the Holocaust caused her great stress and upset.

At Minka's wake, Sage is overwhelmed by the number of people present, so Leo takes her away to a hotel, where the two of them become intimate and enter into a relationship. Upon Josef's release from hospital, Sage decides to help him achieve his final wish. After an in-depth chat with Mary about forgiveness, Sage decides she cannot forgive Josef for the crimes he committed. Josef further confesses to Sage that the worst crime he ever committed was not Darija's murder, but watching his brother choke to death in front of him and choosing not to save him. Sage eventually poisons Josef with a pastry with Monkshood inside instead of cinnamon and chocolate. Josef's last words are "how does it end", with Sage replying "like this" and leaving, not realizing that the words were in fact about Minka's story, which she never completed.

Once Sage returns home, she discovers that the hospital wristband Josef was wearing states his blood type as B+, although Reiner's was known to be AB. After rifling through his possessions, Sage also finds the story that her grandmother wrote during her time in Auschwitz on the back of photos of dead Jews, which had been taken by Reiner's brother, Franz, who had made up his own ending to the story as he was desperate for closure. Sage realizes that Josef Weber was not Reiner Hartmann, but his younger brother Franz, and that she killed a man who was not who she thought he was. Nonetheless, Sage realizes that Franz's conscience was not clear either, as he was still an SS officer.

== Main characters ==
- Sage Singer: The protagonist who (unknowingly) befriends Josef Weber, an ex-Nazi, and eventually agrees to help him die by suicide.
- Josef Weber: An elderly Nazi, who believes that he should die for his crimes and his role in the Holocaust.
- Leo Stein: Works for the Department of Justice and becomes romantically involved with Sage.
- Minka Singer: Sage's grandmother who is a Holocaust survivor.
- Darija Horowicz: Minka's best friend who was killed by Reiner Hartmann during the Holocaust.
- Mary D'Angelis: An ex-nun, Sage's best friend, owner of the bakery where Sage works, and regularly provides Sage with advice.

== Narrative style ==
The Storyteller is narrated by four characters: Sage, Leo, Josef, and Minka. Each character's narrative is told using a different font. Picoult often employs this alternating narrative style throughout her novels, including in, My Sister's Keeper, House Rules, Change of Heart, Songs of the Humpback Whale, Sing You Home, Handle with Care, and Lone Wolf.

== Response ==
The Storyteller reached #1 on the New York Times Bestseller's List.

== Removal from libraries ==
In 2023, the novel was removed from school library shelves in the Martin County School District in Florida, along with 91 other books. Moms for Liberty demanded the removal following the 2022 passage of the Stop WOKE Act, supported and signed into law by Florida Governor Ron DeSantis. The book describes sexual assaults by Nazi concentration camp guards. Twenty of Picoult's books were removed in all, leading her to protest against what she called a "shocking breach of freedom of speech and freedom of information". Referencing Nazi book burnings, she said that there was "a strange irony that a parent wanted this particular book removed, because it felt a bit like history repeating itself".
