= Lone Wolf (Picoult novel) =

2012 novel by Jodi Picoult

- First edition hardcover
- Author: Jodi Picoult
- Publisher: Atria Books
- Publication date: February 28, 2012
- Media type: Print (Hardcover)
- Pages: 421
- ISBN: 978-1-4391-0274-9

Lone Wolf (2012) is the twentieth novel by the American author Jodi Picoult, and it is a New York Times bestselling book. The novel was released on February 28, 2012 through Atria Books and focuses on a man returning to his childhood home after a terrible accident.

== Plot ==
Edward Warren has been living in Thailand for nearly 6 years when he receives a frantic telephone call: His estranged family have been badly injured in a car accident in New Hampshire. Warren's father, Luke is comatose, and his sister, Cara, has also been injured.

Cara still holds a grudge against Edward, ever since his departure led to their parents' divorce. In the wreckage of her parents' ruined marriage, Cara decides to live with her father - an animal conservationist who became famous after living with a gray wolf pack in the Canadian wilderness.

It is almost impossible for Cara to reconcile the broken man in the hospital bed with her father.

== Development ==
Picoult initially began developing Lone Wolf in the early 2000s after speaking with a neurologist about his patients that were in vegetative states. Picoult chose to bring in elements of wolves after dreaming about them and wondering what a person would be like that lived with wolves rather than studying them from afar. Picoult researched the behavior of gray wolves with the help of Shaun Ellis, the founder and head of Wolf Pack Management at Combe Martin Wildlife Park.

== Narrative style ==
Lone Wolf is told through multiple character perspectives, including Luke, Cara, Georgie, Edward, and the final chapter is narrated by Barney. Each character's narrative is written in a different and corresponding font. Picoult has employed this writing technique in a number of her novels, including House Rules, My Sister's Keeper, Songs of the Humpback Whale, Change of Heart, Sing You Home, and Handle with Care.

== Reception ==
Critical reception for Lone Wolf has been mostly positive, with USA Today rating the book three out of four stars. ABC and AZ Central also gave positive reviews, with AZ Central writing, that although parts of the family drama were "predictable", "Picoult's depiction of Luke's other families, the packs of wolves he has known and loved" saved the book.

In comparison, Barbara King, a reviewer for the Washington Post, criticized the book as lacking the balance of Picoult's earlier work. King further criticized the novel in a post for NPR, stating that the portrayal of the wolves was inaccurate and that it misinformed the reader. Lone Wolf was also criticized on similar grounds by representatives of the IWC (International Wolf Center). The IWC's chief wolf educator, Cornelia Hutt, stated the following:

In an effort to debunk the myths about the wolf as 'the beast of waste and desolation,' Picoult has created an equally unscientific, inaccurate and ultimately harmful portrayal of wolves and wolf packs.

L. David Mech, the IWC's founder, and an internationally recognized wolf expert, reviewed the book, and described it as 'outrageous' and 'unbelievable'. He further leveled specific criticism against Picoult's portrayal of wolves as wanting to "study" humans, how wolves supposedly allocate different body parts of a kill to different pack members, how they can tell the age of a prey animal by smelling its teeth, and how most of Picoult's information came from Shaun Ellis, whom he described as "neither a scientist nor an expert on the natural behavior of wolves."
