= Off the Page =

Off the Page may refer to:

- Off the Page (radio series), a British discussion programme, broadcast on BBC Radio 4
- Off the Page (novel), a 2015 young adult fiction novel by Jodi Picoult
