= Between the Lines (musical) =

American stage musical

- Original cast recording cover art
- Music: Elyssa Samsel and Kate Anderson
- Lyrics: Elyssa Samsel and Kate Anderson
- Book: Timothy Allen McDonald
- Basis: Between the Lines (novel)
- Premiere: September 15, 2017: Kansas City Repetory Theatre
- Productions: 2017 Kansas City; 2022 Off-Broadway

Between the Lines is a musical based on the novel of the same name, written by Jodi Picoult, with music and lyrics by Elyssa Samsel and Kate Anderson, and a book by Timothy Allen McDonald. The musical follows 17-year-old Delilah as she struggles to balance fitting in at her new school and a romance with a prince who is another world away.

== Productions ==
Between the Lines had its world premiere production at Kansas City Repertory Theatre. It opened on September 15, 2017, following previews from September 8. It played a limited run to October 1, 2017. Arielle Jacobs played the lead role of Delilah.

The show was scheduled to open Off-Broadway at the Tony Kiser Theatre in May 2020. The production was delayed twice, first to 2021, and then to 2022 due to the COVID-19 pandemic. Between the Lines began previews on June 15, 2022, with an official opening on July 11. It was scheduled to play until October 2, 2022, but closed early on September 11. A cast recording was released on January 13, 2023.

== Musical numbers ==
Act I

- "Another Chapter" – Delilah & Ensemble
- "Between the Lines" – Delilah & Oliver
- "Happily Ever After Hour" – Frump & Ensemble
- "When I'm Talking to Oliver" – Delilah & Ensemble
- "Mr Darcy and Me" – Ms. Winx
- "Inner Thoughts" – Allie, Janice, Martin, Mrs. Brown & Ryan
- "Start Again Tomorrow" – Grace
- "In My Perfect World" – Delilah & Oliver
- "Crazy Chemistry" – Allie & Ensemble
- "Butterflies" – Rapskullio
- "I'm Not Through" – Grace & Delilah
- "A Whole New Story" – Delilah

Act II

- "Best Day Ever" – Ensemble
- "In My Perfect World (reprise)" – Oliver & Delilah
- "Do It For You" – Ondine, Marina & Kyrie
- "Butterflies (reprise)" – Rapskullio
- "Something to Hold On To" – Oliver
- "Leaps and Bounds" – Grace
- "Something to Hold on To (Reprise)"- Oliver
- "Out of Character" – Frump
- "Inner Thoughts (reprise)" – Allie, Janice, Martin & Ryan
- "Allie McAndrews" – Jules, Delilah & Ensemble
- "Can't Get 'Em Out" – Jessamyne, Delilah & Ensemble
- "Between the Lines (reprise)" – Delilah & Oliver
- "Say It In Other Words" – Delilah & Ensemble

== Synopsis ==
=== Act I ===
Delilah McPhee has just moved to a new high school and is dealing with her parents' divorce and her father leaving for his second family. On top of this, she becomes a social pariah after injuring the most popular girl in her grade, Allie McAndrews. To deal with the stress and ridicule, Delilah turns to reading on her roof as a means of escape. She becomes entranced with a children's fairytale called Between the Lines, which documents the story of Prince Oliver defeating his foes to save his betrothed. Delilah thinks that he's good-looking and relatable and begins talking to him about her problems. During one of her rereads, the word HELP shows up on the page, then disappears before she can get a second look.

She learns that Oliver is forced to relive a damsel-saving tale every time someone opens his book and that he and his other fantastical counterparts spend their lives on-call, waiting for their time to perform for the reader. From then on, Delilah and Oliver "meet" and talk on the only page he is alone so they can be fully open with each other. The characters are not as they seem; the villain, Rapskullio, is kind and gentle and prefers painting butterflies to evil schemes, the seemingly guy-crazed mermaids are all feminists, and Oliver is less than pleased with his ditzy love interest, Princess Seraphima. Oliver wants to escape and live an autonomous life, but Delilah tells him that her world isn't perfect, either. The two discuss plans to get each other into the other's world, even asking Rapskullio for help, but nothing seems to work.

Delilah's classmates and teachers sing about their "inner thoughts", which include the weight of being popular, a lesbian crush, and a not-so-secret inter-staff relationship. Feeling alone, Delilah calls her dad, who doesn't answer, and she and her mom end up in a fight that ends in Delilah retreating to her room.

She decides to talk to the school librarian, Ms. Winx, to see if she can provide any guidance. Ms. Winx reveals her literary crush is Mr. Darcy of Pride and Prejudice and says that Delilah should join the creative writing club to make some friends in her world. Jules, another outcast at Delilah's school and a member of the creative writing club, approaches Delilah, who blows Jules off.

Delilah accidentally injures Allie again after Allie teases her about her book, causing Delilah to be suspended. Simultaneously, Oliver asks Rapskullio again if he can bring Delilah into their book so they can be together. Back in Delilah's world, she and her mother fight over her suspension and Delilah storms up to the roof to say goodbye to Oliver for good; her life has been destroyed by her obsession and she feels she needs to get a grip. She closes the book, but falls off the roof, and when she awakens, she is inside of Oliver's story.

=== Act II ===
Delilah wakes up in Oliver's world, where he introduces her to the other characters and takes her to a private place where they kiss. The two have a perfect day, but Delilah meets a group of mermaids who help her realize she can't just abandon her mother for a fairytale and a man. Delilah knows she needs to get home, so she and Oliver visit Rapskullio again to see if there is any way to get her home and are reminded that the book restarts every time someone opens it. The two share one last dance before she disappears back into the real world.

After waking up hospitalized with a concussion, Delilah and her mom make the first steps in repairing their relationship. She sees that Oliver hasn't written to her and worries that she's lost her ability to communicate with him. Heartbroken, Oliver tells her he's devastated that she's gone and that he'll forget about her eventually.

During this whole debacle, Frump, Oliver's sidekick who gets turned into a dog, is asked by Princess Seraphima what she should do since Oliver doesn't love her. Frump confesses his love and the two begin a relationship.

It feels like the world is falling apart, not just for Delilah, but for her classmates as well, although they relegate this feeling to their inner thoughts. Realizing she needs someone on her side in the real world, Delilah joins the creative writing club and tells Jules about Oliver. Jules is friendless and identifies as non-binary, so they and Delilah form a sort of camaraderie. Allie and the bullies start up again, but Jules tells her to ignore them and lead her own life. Jules suggests finding Jessamyn Jacobs, the author of Between the Lines, and asking her to rewrite the ending so that Oliver can come out.

Delilah finds her, but Jessamyn tells Delilah that she can't rewrite the book, she wrote it ages ago to help her son process his father's death. Dejected, Oliver and Delilah meet one final time to say their goodbyes, and Delilah worries that there is no path to her own happy ending.

Funnily enough, Delilah discovers that Jessamyn's son looks exactly like Prince Oliver, and the two start to talk and realize how alike they are. The two fall in love as they begin a new chapter together.

== Cast and characters ==
Character	Off-Broadway (2022)
Delilah	Arielle Jacobs
Prince Oliver	Jake David Smith
Ms. Winx/Mrs. Brown/Kyrie/Jessamyn Jacobs/Lady in Waiting	Vicki Lewis
Grace/Queen Maureen	Julia Murney
Allie McAndrews/Princess Seraphima	Hillary Fisher
Ryan/Frump	Will Burton
Janice/Marina	Jerusha Cavazos
Dr. Ducharme/Doctor/Rapskullio	John Rapson
Jules/Ondine	Wren Rivera
Martin/Troll/Process Server	Sean Stack
Swings/Understudies	Heather Ayers, Dan Hoy, Martin Landry, Aubrey Matalon

== Awards and nominations ==
Year	Award	Category	Nominee	Result
2023	Outer Critics Circle Awards	Outstanding New Off-Broadway Musical		Nominated
2023	Outer Critics Circle Awards	Outstanding Featured Performer in an Off-Broadway Musical	Vikki Lewis	Nominated
2023	Outer Critics Circle Awards	Outstanding New Score	Kate Anderson and Elyssa Samsel	Nominated
