= Leaving Time =

2014 novel by Jodi Picoult

- First edition
- Author: Jodi Picoult
- Language: English
- Genre: Fiction
- Publisher: Ballantine Books (first edition)
- Publication date: October 14, 2014
- Publication place: United States
- Media type: Print (paperback)
- Pages: 416pp (first edition)
- ISBN: 978-0-345-54492-6 (first edition)
- OCLC: 954719403
- Preceded by: The Storyteller
- Followed by: Off the Page

Leaving Time is a 2014 novel by American writer Jodi Picoult. It is the twenty-third novel written by the author. The first edition was published on October 14, 2014, by Ballantine Books, an imprint of Random House.

== Plot summary ==
Ten years after her mother went missing, Jenna sets out to find her with a retired detective and a psychic.

When Jenna was three, her mother, Alice, was in an accident at an elephant sanctuary in New Hampshire, where Jenna's parents and another family worked. The accident resulted in another employee found trampled to death, and Alice sustained a head injury. That same night, Alice checked herself out of the hospital and was never seen again. Jenna's father and Alice's husband, Thomas Metcalf, develops bipolar disorder and is taken to a mental institution. Jenna is placed into the custody of her grandmother.

After Jenna's 13th birthday, she sets out to find her mother and convinces two adults to help her: Virgil, a former detective, and Serenity, a psychic who had lost her ability to connect to the beyond. After some struggles and disagreements along the way, the trio sets out to find clues at the elephant sanctuary. At the scene of the accident, they find a pebble necklace.

In hopes of finding more information, they go visit Thomas Metcalf, who reacts violently when seeing Jenna in the necklace. This makes Virgil believe that Thomas acted out because there was suspicion that Alice had been having an affair with another worker at the elephant sanctuary, Gideon. Jenna then starts tracking down Gideon, whom she finds at another elephant sanctuary in Tennessee.

Gideon confesses that he and Alice had an affair. When his wife, Grace (another employee at the elephant sanctuary) discovered this, she killed herself.

Alice becomes pregnant with Gideon's baby; they plan to run away with Jenna. Nevvie, Grace's mother and Gideon's mother-in-law, is devastated by her daughter's death and enraged at Alice and Gideon.

Jenna now believes her mother is probably dead, so she asks Serenity to contact her. Serenity needs a strong presence to be able to communicate with the dead, so they go to a spot in the elephant sanctuary that had a special meaning for Alice. Despite her efforts, Serenity cannot see anything, but to give Jenna some form of closure, she fakes a vision. During this time, she stumbles across a new piece of evidence—a tooth lodged in the dirt.

Virgil, Serenity, and Jenna take the tooth for DNA testing and get the results back stating that the tooth comes from a child under the age of five. Immediately, Jenna remembers what happened that night...

Three-year-old Jenna is led out to the sanctuary grounds by her babysitter Nevvie, who smashes Jenna over the head with a rock in revenge for her daughter's death. When Alice arrives at the scene, it is too late for her daughter, but not for Nevvie. They fight and Alice loses consciousness after receiving a blow to the head. The next thing Alice remembers at the scene is her daughter's missing body, and Nevvie dead. One of the elephants drags Jenna's body away and covers it with dirt, a symbol of mourning. Alice flees to Africa, in fear of being accused of murder.

This is when Jenna realizes that she is actually dead, but caught in the middle of the physical world and spirit dimension. Virgil also realizes that he is a ghost. When he failed to solve Alice's disappearance the first time, he tried to kill himself, but didn't realize that it worked. After thinking they were alive for the previous ten years, both of them are able to move onto the spirit realm, teaching Serenity that she hadn't lost her psychic gift.

In their memory, Serenity contacts the police to show them the tooth. Shortly after, Jenna's body is found near the scene of the accident, and the case is finally put to rest. Alice gets a call that her daughter's body has been found, so she returns to the United States for Jenna's burial. Alice finally gets closure when Serenity contacts her, and claims that she has spoken to Jenna. At first, Alice is skeptical, but Serenity is able to convince Alice that she is not crazy by telling her different trivial facts that were impossible to explain, as well as manifest Jenna's spirit into a mirror. Finally, everyone is able to move on.

== Reception ==
The Boston Globe notes, "Picoult does her homework, and her main themes are thoroughly researched and engrossingly presented. With this new novel, 'Leaving Time,' her fans will not be disappointed." Critics at The Globe and Mail also believe that "this is Picoult at the top of her game". A positive audiobook review by Kirkus Reviews notes, "The backstory of family drama played out against the plight of African elephants is as rich and captivating as the prevailing plot. Leaving before the story ends will not be an option!"
