= Plain Truth =

Plain Truth may refer to:

- Plain Truth (novel), 2001 novel by Jodi Picoult
  - Plain Truth (film), 2004 TV drama directed by Paul Shapiro based on the novel
- Plain Truth (pamphlet), 1776 pamphlet authored by loyalist James Chalmers during the American Revolution as a rebuke of Thomas Paine's pamphlet Common Sense
- The Plain Truth, free of charge monthly magazine, first published in 1934 by Herbert W. Armstrong, founder of The Radio Church of God, which he later named The Worldwide Church of God
- Plain Truth, a song from Jacobite Relics
