= Picture Perfect =

Picture Perfect may refer to:

== Film and television ==
- Picture Perfect (1995 film), a comedy starring Dave Thomas and Mary Page Keller
- Picture Perfect (1997 film), a romantic comedy starring Jennifer Aniston and Jay Mohr
- Picture Perfect (2016 film), a Nigerian romantic drama film
- "Picture Perfect!" (The Raccoons), an episode of The Raccoons
- "Picture Perfect" (The Loud House), a 2016 episode of The Loud House
- "Picture Perfect" (PB&J Otter), an episode of PB&J Otter
- "Picture Perfect" (Sabrina: The Animated Series), an episode of Sabrina: The Animated Series
- "Picture Perfect" (Max & Ruby), an episode of Max & Ruby
- "Picture Perfect" (Handy Manny), an episode of Handy Manny
- "Picture Perfect" (Lloyd in Space), an episode of Lloyd in Space

== Literature ==
- Picture Perfect (novel), a 1995 novel by Jodi Picoult
- Picture Perfect, a novel based on the TV series Charmed

== Music ==
=== Albums ===
- Picture Perfect (12 Stones album), 2017
- Picture Perfect (Ahmad Jamal album), 2001
- Picture Perfect (Every Avenue album), 2009
- Picture Perfect (Soil album), 2009
- Picture Perfect, by Close to Home, 2006
- Picture Perfect, by Rittz, 2020

=== Songs ===
- "Picture Perfect" (Roll Deep song), 2012
- "Picture Perfect" (Sevendust song), 2013
- "Picture Perfect", by Angela Via released before her song "I Don't Care"
- "Picture Perfect", by Chamillionaire from The Sound of Revenge
- "Picture Perfect", by Chris Brown from Exclusive
- "Picture Perfect!", by Jeffree Star from Cupcakes Taste Like Violence
- "Picture Perfect", by Man Overboard from Man Overboard
- "Picture Perfect", by Michael W. Smith from Change Your World
- "Picture Perfect", by Nelly Furtado from Folklore
- "Picture Perfect", by Skylar Grey from Natural Causes
- "Picture Perfect", by Wizkid from Sounds from the Other Side
- "Picture Perfect (Freestyle)", by Jhené Aiko from Trip

== See also ==
- Perfect Picture (disambiguation)
