= Ian Fletcher =

Ian Fletcher may refer to:

- Ian Fletcher (diplomat), Director of GCSB in New Zealand
- Ian Fletcher (literary critic) (1920–1988), British scholar
- Ian Fletcher (tennis) (born 1948), former tennis player from Australia
- Ian Fletcher, historian of the British Army during the early 19th century, especially in the Peninsular War campaign
- Ian Fletcher, the main character in the novel Keeping Faith by Jodi Picoult
- Ian Fletcher, the main character in the BBC comedy series Twenty Twelve and its follow-up W1A, played by Hugh Bonneville

== See also ==
- Iain Fletcher (born 1966), British television actor
- Iain Fletcher (cricketer) (born 1971), English cricketer
