= Wish You Were Here (Picoult novel) =

2021 novel by Jodi Picoult

- First edition (US)
- Author: Jodi Picoult
- Language: English
- Publisher: Ballantine Books (US); Hodder & Stoughton (UK); Allen & Unwin (AUS)
- Publication date: November 30, 2021
- Publication place: United States of America
- Media type: Print (hardcover), e-Book
- Pages: 310 pp
- ISBN: 9781984818416
- Preceded by: The Book of Two Ways

Wish You Were Here is a novel written by American novelist Jodi Picoult. It was first published by Ballantine Books in 2021.
