= Elvis McGonagall =

Scottish poet and stand-up comedian (born 1960)

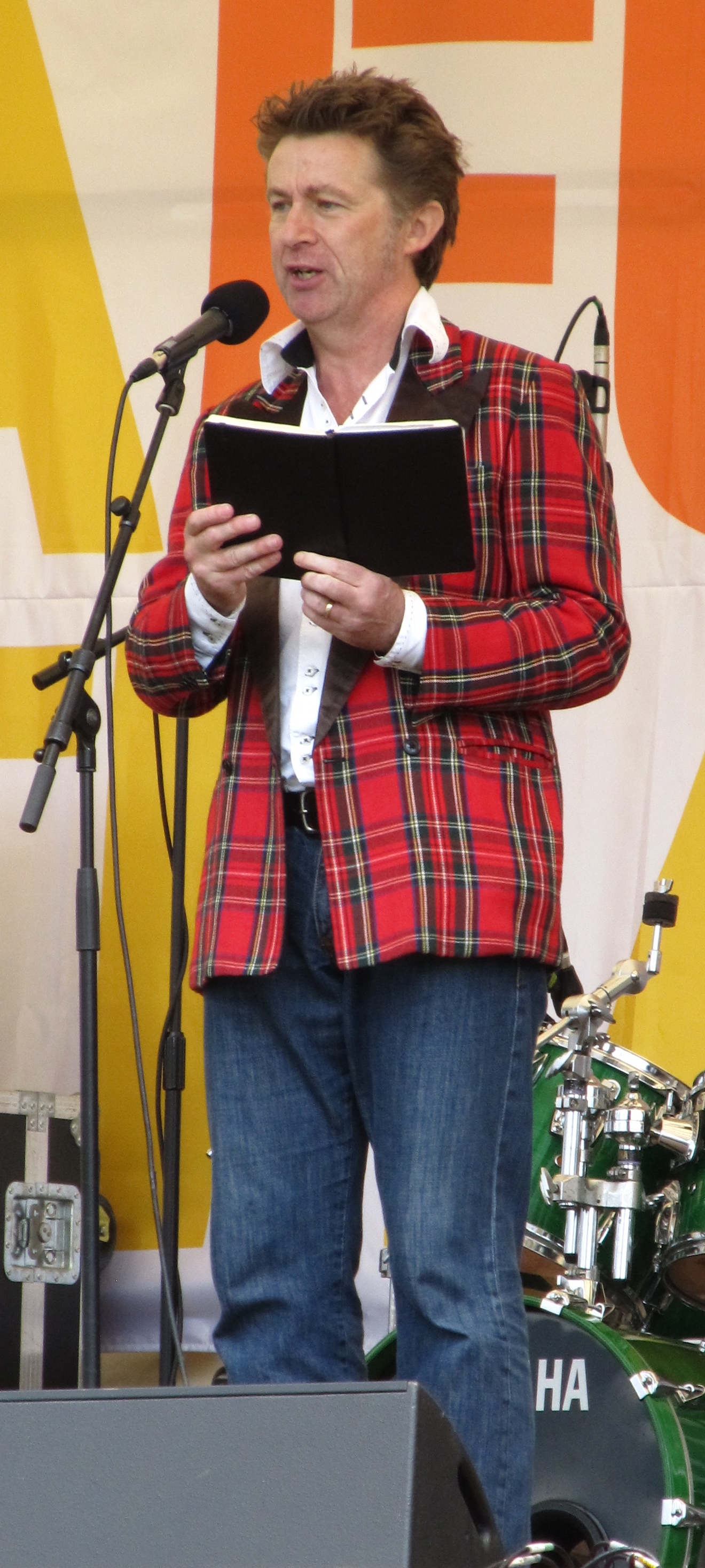
Elvis McGonagall reading poetry at the Tolpuddle Martyrs' Festival and Rally 2012

Elvis McGonagall (born Richard Smith; 22 December 1960) is a Scottish poet and stand-up comedian who is especially notable for poetry slam performances.

== Biography ==
McGonagall was born in Perth, Scotland, and now lives in Stroud in South West England. His stage name combines a reference to the notoriously bad poet William McGonagall with 'Elvis' "because it's just so wrong, the wrongest name I could think of to go with McGonagall".

== Poetry ==
=== Slam performances ===
McGonagall first performed publicly at the UK Allcomers' Slam at the Cheltenham Literature Festival in 2003, finishing runner-up; he went on to win the slam the following year. His career saw significant progress in 2006, in which year McGonagall won the Spokefest UK Slam Championship and the World Slam Championship at the Rotterdam Poetry International Festival.

McGonagall performs at poetry events nationwide, as well as competing at the Blue Suede Sporran Club.

=== Media performances ===
McGonagall has regularly appeared on BBC Radio 4's Saturday Live, beginning with contributions to the premiere episode. He has appeared frequently on other BBC Radio 4 programmes, including Today, Last Word and Off the Page as well as starring in two series of his own sitcom Elvis Mcgonagall Takes a Look on the Bright Side, Radio 4's Comedy of the Week stand-up special Full Tartan Jacket (2021) and a documentary My Name Is Elvis (2021).

McGonagall has also appeared on various television programmes for a number of broadcasters. His credits include BBC One's The One Show, BBC Two's The Culture Show and Channel 4's Random Acts.

== Works ==
Audio

- Gie’ It Laldy! (2018) - Elvis McGonagall & His Resurrectors
- One Man And His Doggerel - Live! (2010)

Written

- Complete & Utter Cult! (2020)
- Viva Loch Lomond! (2017)
- Mostly Dreich (2012)
