= Nineteen Minutes =

2007 novel by Jodi Picoult

- First edition
- Author: Jodi Picoult
- Language: English
- Genre: Thriller
- Publisher: Atria
- Publication date: March 9, 2007
- Publication place: USA
- Media type: Print (Paperback)
- Pages: 455 pp
- ISBN: 978-1-74175-072-0

Nineteen Minutes (2007) is the fourteenth novel by the American author Jodi Picoult. It was Picoult's first book to debut at #1 on the New York Times Best Seller list. This novel follows the unfolding of a school shooting, including the events leading up to the incident and the aftermath of the incident.

== Plot ==
The story begins on March 6, 2007, in the small town of Sterling, New Hampshire, tracking the lives of a number of characters on an "ordinary day." The characters include Alex Cormier, a superior court judge; her daughter Josie, a junior in high school; Lacy, Lewis, and Peter Houghton; Detective Patrick Ducharme; and several victims-to-be.

At the local high school, Sterling High, the story follows a routine day of students in classes, at the gym, and in the cafeteria. Suddenly, a loud bang is heard from the parking lot, which turns out to be a bomb set off in Matt Royston's car. As the students are distracted by the noise, gunshots are fired. When Patrick, the only detective on the Sterling police force, arrives at Sterling High, he searches the school to seek out the gunman, who is alleged to be a student. After passing several dead and wounded victims, Patrick traps and arrests the shooter, Peter Houghton, in the locker room, where he finds two students, Josie Cormier and Matt Royston, lying on the floor surrounded in blood. While Matt is dead, having been the only victim shot twice, Josie is not seriously injured, but only shocked: she cannot remember what occurred.

The shooting kills 10 people (nine students and one teacher) and wounds many other people.

Throughout the book, time flashes back and forth between events before and after the shooting. In the past, the reader learns that Peter and Josie were once close friends. Peter was frequently the target of severe bullying at school, and Josie often stuck up for him. The friends slowly drifted apart as they got older: Josie joined the popular crowd in order to protect her own interests, seeing her relationship to Peter as embarrassing. The story pictures Peter as an outcast at home as well; Peter believes his older brother Joey is favored by their parents. Joey is a popular straight-A student and athlete, but feels it necessary to ridicule Peter to protect his reputation, even fabricating a story that Peter was adopted. When Joey is killed in a car accident in 2006, Lacy and Lewis Houghton are too upset to pay attention to their remaining son, causing a bigger rift between Peter and his parents.

In their sophomore year, Josie begins dating Matt, a popular jock who leads his friends Drew Girard and John Eberhard in bullying Peter. Matt often calls Peter "homo" and "fag," leading Peter to question his sexual orientation. The bullying intensifies once Matt begins dating Josie, in his possessive efforts to keep her away from other boys. On one occasion, Peter approaches Josie after school to try talking to her. Matt beats him up, leaving Peter humiliated in front of the school.

The flashbacks also reveal several subplots: the difficult relationship between Josie and her single mother Alex, Alex's dilemma of being a judge and a mother, Peter's escape from bullying into the world of video games, Josie's fear of falling out of the popular crowd and her suicide back-up plan when she does, Matt's abusive behavior toward Josie, Josie's pregnancy and subsequent miscarriage, as well as Lewis Houghton's hunting lessons with his son Peter.

One month before the shooting, Matt rapes Josie, while Peter realizes that he has feelings for Josie, and sends her an email expressing his love. Courtney Ignatio reads this email before Josie and has Drew forward it to the entire school, while Josie realizes to her horror that she's pregnant. Courtney then convinces Peter that Josie likes him. Peter asks Josie to join him later during lunch, only to suffer public humiliation as Matt pulls down Peter's pants and exposes his genitals to a cafeteria full of students. Josie miscarries Matt's child, and Peter's psychotic break is triggered on the morning of the shooting when he turns on his computer and accidentally opens the email he wrote to Josie.

After the shooting, Peter is sent to jail while the trial proceeds. The probable cause hearing is waived as Peter admits to killing ten people and wounding nineteen others. Jordan, Peter's defense attorney, uses battered person syndrome caused by severe bullying and abuse as a basis to convince the jury that Peter's actions were justified as a result of his suffering from post-traumatic stress disorder. Jordan argues that he was in a dissociative state at the time of the shooting. In the final stage of the trial, Josie reveals that she was the one who shot Matt the first time in the stomach after grabbing a gun that fell out of Peter's bag. She admits later that she did this on account of the abusive behavior that she had endured while in a relationship with him. Peter later fired the fatal second shot; a blow to the head. Peter promised her he would not tell anyone what she had done, and he kept this promise, happy to have Josie as his friend again.

Peter is convicted of eight counts of first-degree murder and two counts of second-degree murder and is sentenced to life in prison. A month afterward, Peter commits suicide by stuffing a sock into his throat.

At the end of the book, one year from the date of the massacre, Josie has received a five-year sentence for accessory of manslaughter and is regularly visited in jail by her mother. Throughout the book, Josie never told the whole story, instead repeating, "I cannot remember." When Josie admits to shooting Matt, Peter's sentence is reduced. Alex and Patrick, who are expecting their first child, walk the halls of the high school. Sterling High has been extensively remodeled after the shooting. The cafeteria, the gym and locker room where the massacre took place have been replaced by a large glass atrium with a memorial to the dead in the center, a row of ten white chairs bolted to the floor. A plaque declares the building "A Safe Harbor."

== Characters ==
- Peter Houghton: The protagonist. An odd kid, who has been mercilessly bullied for most of his life. He has an avid interest in computers and video games. Peter wears glasses, making him a frequent target of teasing. Peter maintained a friendship with Josie Cormier until middle school, when she distanced herself from him and instead chose to befriend the popular students. After his friendship with Josie deteriorates, Peter befriends Derek, often creating video games with him. Peter's home life is rocky; he never seemed to relate to his parents, despite his mother's best efforts. His older brother, Joey, teased Peter and often encouraged bullying, even fabricating that Peter was adopted. During his high school years, Peter realizes he is in love with Josie, sparking a drastic chain of events. Peter emails Josie a love letter, which is intercepted by some of Josie's popular friends. This event is the catalyst in Peter's actions. After a lengthy trial and eventual conviction for murdering and severely injuring his classmates, Peter kills himself in prison by stuffing a sock down his throat.
- Josie Cormier: Once Peter's best friend, their relationship fractures in middle school when Josie becomes part of the popular clique. Over the years, Josie has great difficulty maintaining her image, torn between what she is expected to be and how she wants to be. Josie realizes the shallowness of her clique and even acknowledges it on occasion, but she is too afraid to leave them, fearing social obscurity and alienation. Josie deeply dislikes her friends' and boyfriend's treatment of less popular students, but is never able to stand up to them. Josie's home life is not perfect; she has a strained relationship with her mother and never knew her father. She clings to Matt for emotional support and comfort. Matt is physically abusive towards her, but she does not want to break up with him. In a final twist in the novel, it is revealed that Josie shot Matt in the stomach the day of Peter's rampage. Josie is sentenced to five years in prison.
- Alex Cormier: Josie's mother. Throughout the novel, flashbacks reveal that she had trouble connecting with her daughter. Alex is also the judge assigned to Peter's trial, until Josie is called as a witness.
- Patrick Ducharme: A detective on the Sterling Police Force and Alex's love interest. He is a recurring character, appearing previously in Picoult's novel Perfect Match. Patrick is the chief detective on the Sterling High School shooting case. At the end of the novel, he and Alex are romantically involved and expecting their first child.
- Lacy Houghton: Peter's mother. She is a midwife, and struggles to understand her son's actions. When she discovers Joey, Peter's older brother, was a heroin addict, she disposes of the evidence, as she cannot bring herself to accept her deceased son was anything other than perfect. At the end of the novel, she keeps Peter's room maintained as a memento to her son.
- Lewis Houghton: Peter's father. A happiness economist and college lecturer. He owns many guns, which are stored in the house, and used frequently for hunting. Lewis tried to introduce Peter to hunting, and often took him on trips, but Peter was uninterested. When Peter was in jail, awaiting trial, Lewis does not visit him, instead, he went to the grave of the victims of the shooting. It is revealed that Lewis favoured Joey, Peter's older brother, over Peter, but he only acknowledges this truth near the end of the novel.
- Matt Royston: Josie's boyfriend. Matt is the most popular boy in at Sterling High and is an aggressive hockey player. Matt and his best friend, Drew, often bullied Peter, beginning in kindergarten. Matt is abusive towards Josie, on one occasion, causing her to break her leg. Matt is the final victim in the school shooting, and the only victim to be shot twice. Despite being a victim, he is the primary antagonist of the story.
- Jordan McAfee: Peter's defense attorney. He is a recurring character, appearing in Picoult's novels The Pact, Salem Falls and Mad Honey. He has an infant son, as well as an older son, Thomas McAfee (who appears in The Pact and Salem Falls) and is married to Selena McAfee. He represents Peter because he believes that the boy deserves a fair trial.
- Selena McAfee: Jordan's wife who assists with her husband's case and one of the few people who is sympathetic towards Peter. Selena is a recurring character, appearing along with Jordan, and Jordan's son from his first marriage, Thomas McAfee.
- Drew Girard: A popular student, and Matt's best friend. He, along with Matt, would repeatedly bully Peter. Drew was shot in the shoulder while he was running away from the gunfire with Matt and Josie.
- John Eberhard: A popular student who was sustained a head wound during the shooting. He is left with severe brain damage, and is now mentally handicapped.
- Brady Pryce: A popular student who dated Haley Weaver. He and Haley were considered "The Brangelina of Sterling High". He was injured protecting Haley during the shooting.
- Haley Weaver: The girlfriend of Brady Pryce, a Sterling High senior. She and Brady were considered "The Brangelina of Sterling High". Prior to the shooting, she was elected Homecoming Queen. She was badly disfigured in the shooting, needing a multitude of plastic surgery operations to her face.
- Derek Markowitz: Peter's only friend after Josie becomes friends with the designated "popular crowd". He and Peter met when their mothers forced them to play soccer together. The teens have been friends since. Derek enjoys creating computer games, several of which were co-created with Peter.
- Ed McCabe: A closeted math teacher who dies during the shooting. He offered support to Peter, who was confused about his sexuality in a flashback in the novel.
- Courtney Ignatio: A popular girl who is friends with Josie, after she and Peter have a falling-out. Courtney dies after being shot in the chest during the shooting. She relentlessly bullied Peter; convincing him that Josie had feelings for him and then publicly humiliating him.
- Joey Houghton: Peter's dead brother. Joey was seen as the "all American son", good grades, great athlete, etc. However, this is contradicted by his actions later in the story (such as when he bullied Peter or when he used heroin.) Joey was killed by a drunk driver.
- Logan Rourke: Josie's biological father. Married, and not interested in Josie's life. He tried to bribe Josie to leave him alone when she attempted to connect with him, thinking it was an attempt at blackmail.

== Reception ==
The book received generally favorable reviews by critics, for the writing, character development, plot twists, and the moral issues raised, including peer pressure, popularity, self-image, school bullying, betrayal and deception, sexual orientation doubt, teen dating violence, suicide, video game violence, single parenthood and communication barriers between adolescents and adults. The Associated Press acknowledged that although Peter's guilt cannot be in doubt from a legal perspective, it is hard for readers to know where to put the blame as the story unfolds. Rocky Mountain News agreed, stating that while the beginning shooting scene makes it "painfully clear who the victims and killer are. As the novel unfolds, Picoult succeeds in lifting those assumptions up for scrutiny, until villains and victims seem to blend into a motley jumble of alliances and rejection."

The Free Lance-Star mentioned that Nineteen Minutes created a two-sided story that helps readers understand everything about the school shooting, which is more than what normal media coverage will provide about this type of tragedy. Janet Maslin in the New York Times praised Picoult's writing, commenting that she "writes articulately and clearly, making her all too much of a rarity among popular authors." Frances Taliaferro in the Washington Post called the book not only a thriller that is "complete with dismaying carnage, urgent discoveries and 11th-hour revelations", but also a source of serious moral questions about relationships between children and adults, and among children themselves. The Boston Globe considered Nineteen Minutes "an insightful deconstruction of youthful alienation, of the shattering repercussions of bullying, and the disturbing effects of benign neglect."

An ambiguous point in the story is the identity of the author of the handwritten journal entries at the start of the book chapters, with New York Times saying this writer may or may not be Peter, although "it doesn't sound like him", and Hippo Press analyzing that whether or not the writer is identified "doesn't matter"; the author may be either Josie or Peter, and the point is that the diary pieces "provide insight into the workings of the teenage mind", showing that they are "not all that different." Peter, the shooter, is also noted by USA Today as a lonely bullied student more similar to the offender in 1997 Heath High School shooting in Paducah, Kentucky than the offenders in Columbine High School massacre. (Both shooting incidents are mentioned in the story and used by Picoult as materials for research.)

=== Censorship ===
In 2022, Nineteen Minutes was listed among 52 books banned by the Alpine School District following the implementation of Utah law H.B. 374, "Sensitive Materials In Schools". As of 2025, according to PEN America it was the book most sanctioned by US school districts in the US, with 98 bans. According to the author the reason most commonly cited for the bans is her use on page 313 of the word "erection".

Forty-two percent of removed books "feature LBGTQ+ characters and or themes." Many of the books were removed because they were considered to contain pornographic material according to the new law, which defines porn using the following criteria:

- "The average person" would find that the material, on the whole, "appeals to prurient interest in sex"
- The material "is patently offensive in the description or depiction of nudity, sexual conduct, sexual excitement, sadomasochistic abuse, or excretion"
- The material, on the whole, "does not have serious literary, artistic, political or scientific value."

== Autobiographical elements ==
Jodi Picoult says her "children struggled with fitting in and being bullied" which made them "guinea pigs" for her characters in the novel. Picoult understood that the topic of bullying was universal because everyone has experienced bullying in some form.
