= Salem Falls =

2001 novel by Jodi Picoult

- First edition
- Author: Jodi Picoult
- Language: English
- Publisher: Simon & Schuster
- Publication date: 23 April 2001
- Publication place: United States
- Media type: Print (Hardcover & Paperback)
- Pages: 434 pp
- ISBN: 0-7434-1870-0
- OCLC: 45556191
- Dewey Decimal: 813/.54 21
- LC Class: PS3566.I372 S26 2001

Salem Falls (2001) is the eighth novel by the American author Jodi Picoult. The novel explores what happens to a person when he is given a label and is not allowed to escape from it.

== Plot summary ==
Jack is a highly educated high school teacher at a private school for girls in New England. However, he is falsely accused of committing statutory rape with one of his students. Following his lawyer's advice, he accepts a plea bargain for a lesser charge and is sentenced to eight months in prison. Jack's mother refuses to believe his claims of innocence and abandons him.

After serving his sentence, Jack wants to have a fresh start, which he finds when he wanders into a diner in Salem Falls, New Hampshire. Without disclosing his past, he is hired as a dishwasher. He begins a romantic relationship with Addie Peabody, the woman who operates the diner with her father, Roy. At the time, she is still mourning the death of her young daughter, Chloe, who died from bacterial meningitis at age six. Under the law, he is required to register with the local police as a convicted sex offender. As this is public record, the entire town becomes aware of his past. However, Addie does not change her attitude toward him.

Simultaneously, the novel focuses on local teenage girls who experiment with Wicca: disturbed Gillian, the daughter of prominent businessman Amos Duncan; Chelsea; Whitney; and Meg. One night, after a fight with Addie, Jack accidentally stumbles upon them in the woods while they are celebrating the Wiccan holiday of Beltane. He is accused of sexually assaulting Gillian. Due to his intoxicated state at the time, he is unable to recall exactly where he was that night.

Jack is defended by attorney Jordan McAfee. Throughout the trial, Jordan casts reasonable doubt on Gillian's testimony. However, Meg confides in Addie that she remembers Jack touching her in a sexual manner. Addie takes Meg to report the incident to policeman Charlie, who is Meg's father. Clues begin to unravel that Gillian has been lying about the assault. Sources allege that she and her clique were taking hallucinogenic drugs. The initial blood screening test Gillian takes show no evidence of drugs. Jordan hires a private toxicologist to run tests on the blood samples, which reveal extreme amounts of a hallucinogen. Gillian's psychiatric records note that she was known to be a compulsive liar after the death of her mother.

Chelsea, feeling a sense of conscience, mails "The Book of Shadows" (a witch's handbook and proof that the teenagers are part of a witch's coven) to Thomas, Jordan's son, who takes it to Jordan. Jordan uses the book as evidence against Gillian and Jack is found not guilty. After the trial, Meg tells her father that Gillian convinced the teenagers to fabricate everything as a game to see if they could ruin Jack's life because Gillian was attracted to him and he turned her down. Meg's report of Jack having touched her is found to be accidental, as Jack was saving Meg from a fall and accidentally touched her breast.

Addie tells Jack that she was gang-raped at sixteen by Charlie and Amos. As such, she never knew who Chloe's father was. Jack asks Addie to move with him to New York in an effort to reconcile with his mother. Addie agrees.

The final twist is saved for the last paragraph: Amos has been sexually abusing Gillian since she was a young child, and it is likely that the seminal fluid found on Gillian's thigh is his, not Jack's.

== Characters ==
- Jack St. Bride: Protagonist, a former star athlete and high school history teacher who is accused and convicted of statutory rape. He is an avid watcher of Jeopardy!.
- Addie Peabody: Owns and operates the diner in Salem Falls, along with her father, Roy. She was raped and became pregnant in her teenage years. Her daughter, Chloe, died early in childhood.
- Roy Peabody: Addie's father who co-owns and operates the diner.
- Gillian Duncan: A teenage girl living in Salem Falls who is attracted to Jack; she is Amos's daughter.
- Amos Duncan: Gillian's father and owner of the largest pharmaceutical company in Salem Falls. He and Addie went to school together.
- Jordan McAfee: Jack's defense attorney. Jordan, his son Thomas McAfee, and his assistant Selena Damascus appear in other Jodi Picoult novels, The Pact, Nineteen Minutes, and Mad Honey.

== Film adaptation ==
The film debuted November 19, 2011 on Lifetime Television. Filming started August 10, 2011, according to Picoult. The film stars James Van Der Beek, Sarah Carter, and Amanda Michalka. Some scenes from the film were shot in and around the town of Fergus in Centre Wellington, Ontario, Canada.

=== Cast ===
- James Van Der Beek as Jack McBradden
- Sarah Sanguin Carter as Addie Peabody, Chloe's mother
- AJ Michalka as Gillian Duncan
- Rick Roberts as Amos Duncan, Gillian's father
- Peter MacNeil as Roy Peabody, Addie's father and Chloe's maternal grandfather
- James Thomas as Jordan McAfee, Jack's attorney and Thomas's father
- Allie MacDonald as Megan Saxton
- Zoe Belkin as Chelsea
