= Mercy (novel) =

1996 novel by Jodi Picoult

- Author: Jodi Picoult
- Language: English
- Genre: Family saga novel
- Publisher: Putnam
- Publication date: 1996
- Publication place: United States
- ISBN: 9781416549383
- OCLC: 1015606433

Mercy (1996) is a popular novel by Jodi Picoult.

== Plot ==
The book is about the police chief of a small Massachusetts town, Cameron McDonald, whose cousin Jamie confesses to him that he has assisted the suicide of his terminally ill wife. Cameron arrests Jamie and proceeds to testify for the prosecution over the objections of his wife, Allie. Cameron is also the chieftain of the McDonald clan, who form a significant part of the town and its culture.

== Reception ==
Mercy was named one of the top seven novels of 1996 by Glamour magazine, and included in selection for the Literary Guild and Doubleday Book Club.

== See also ==
- Euthanasia
- Scottish clans
