= Last Breath (Sevendust song) =

Single by Sevendust

from the album Cold Day Memory
- Released: January 24, 2011
- Studio: Groovemaster (Chicago, Illinois)
- Genre: Alternative metal
- Length: 3:48
- Label: 7 Bros.
- Songwriters: John Connolly; Vinnie Hornsby; Clint Lowery; Corey Lowery; Morgan Rose; Lajon Witherspoon
- Producer: Johnny K

Sevendust singles chronology
"Forever" (2010)	"Last Breath" (2011)	"Decay" (2013)

"Last Breath" is a song by the American rock band Sevendust. It was released as the third and final single from the band's eighth studio album, Cold Day Memory (2010), on January 24, 2011.

== Charts ==
Chart (2011)	Peak position
US Mainstream Rock (Billboard)	32
