= Forever (Sevendust song) =

Single by Sevendust

from the album Cold Day Memory
- Released: July 26, 2010
- Studio: Groovemaster (Chicago, Illinois)
- Genre: Alternative metal
- Length: 3:26
- Label: 7Bros/ILG
- Songwriters: John Connolly; Vinnie Hornsby; Clint Lowery; Corey Lowery; Morgan Rose; Lajon Witherspoon
- Producer: Johnny K

Sevendust singles chronology
"Unraveling" (2010)	"Forever" (2010)	"Last Breath" (2011)

"Forever" (also known as "Forever Dead") is a song by the American rock band Sevendust. It was released as the second single from their eighth studio album, Cold Day Memory (2010). The single was released in radio stations on July 26, 2010. The song was originally titled "Forever Dead", with advance copies of the album using that title instead of "Forever".

== Charts ==
Chart (2010)	Peak position
US Mainstream Rock (Billboard)	18
