= Second Glance =

2003 novel by Jodi Picoult

- First edition
- Author: Jodi Picoult
- Language: English
- Publisher: Atria
- Publication date: April 8, 2003
- Publication place: United States
- Media type: Print (Hardcover)
- Pages: 432 pp
- ISBN: 978-0-7434-5450-6
- OCLC: 51927506

Second Glance (2003) is the tenth novel by the American author Jodi Picoult.

== Plot summary ==
Second Glance follows the lives of several characters throughout the book. In Picoult's signature writing style, the novel flashes back and forth many decades to piece together the story. The novel is set in the fictional town of Comtosook, Vermont.

The story is about Abenaki territorial land that is planned to be turned into a shopping mall. However, if the Abenaki are able to show that an ancestor was buried on this expanse of land, then the mall cannot, legally, be built on the land.

Ross Wakeman arrives in Comtosook to stay with his sister, Shelby. Ross is the survivor of many varied suicide attempts, which began after his fiancée Aimee was killed in a car accident years ago. Ross became a ghost hunter in the hopes that someday he would encounter Aimee's spirit. Fortunately for Ross, when he arrives in Comtosook, the town begins to experience strange phenomena, as the result of the new plans to build a strip mall on the Abenaki land.

== Characters ==
- Ross Wakeman: The male protagonist, a ghost hunter who moves around the country, now living with his sister in Comtosook, Vermont.
- Shelby Wakeman: Ross's sister, Ethan's mother, divorced, a librarian with a passion for unusual, complicated words, and etymology.
- Ethan Wakeman: Ross's nine-year-old nephew and Shelby's son. He suffers from Xeroderma pigmentosum.
- Cecelia Pike/Lia Beaumont: A suicidal woman featured in the present-day as well as in flashbacks.
- Eli Rochert: A half-Abenaki police officer whose wife left him. After seeing Shelby in his dreams for weeks, he finds her and falls in love with her. He works with Ross to solve the murder mystery.
- Meredith Oliver: A woman who works doing preimplantation genetic diagnosis. She is divorced, and has little luck with men. As a working mother, she relies on her grandmother, Ruby, to take care of her daughter.
- Lucy Oliver: The eight-year-old daughter of Meredith. She is intelligent for her age, but she sees things that nobody else can, including ghosts.
- Spencer Pike: Cecelia's abusive husband, works as a eugenicist in the flashbacks. In the present-day, he lives at the Comtosook nursing home.
- John Delacour: Also known as, Gray Wolf and Az Thompson. A 102-year-old Abenaki man, the last surviving member of his tribe, and the suspected murderer of Cecelia Pike.
