= Decay (Sevendust song) =

Single by Sevendust

from the album Black Out the Sun
- Released: January 22, 2013
- Studio: Architekt Music (Butler, New Jersey)
- Genre: Alternative metal
- Length: 3:25
- Label: 7 Bros./ADA
- Songwriters: John Connolly; Vinnie Hornsby; Clint Lowery; Morgan Rose; Lajon Witherspoon
- Producer: Sevendust

Sevendust singles chronology
"Last Breath" (2011)	"Decay" (2013)	"Picture Perfect" (2013)

Music video
- "Decay" on YouTube

"Decay" is a song by the American rock band Sevendust. It was released on January 22, 2013, as the lead single from their ninth studio album, Black Out the Sun (2013).

== Recording and production ==
The song was recorded at Architekt Music studios in Butler, New Jersey with engineer Mike Ferretti. "We were starting to get burnt and we didn't want to push it," Rose said during interview with Billboard magazine. "So we had this riff, and we said, 'Let's jam it and see if anything comes of it.' And before you know it, it became a song that ends up on the record, and everybody listens to it and they end up picking that as the single, which was pretty cool."

The song was originally intended as a bonus track but the finished product was massive and became the first single.

== Music video ==
The band filmed the video for the song at the end of January 2013, just before their tour that had started on February 2, 2013. The music video was released on March 26, 2013.

The video features the band setting up shop in a rather spooky house, while the look of old film stock gives it that extra ounce of dark atmosphere. Each of the band members are seen entering the house and setting up shop in different rooms, with a rather dooming fate befalling of them.

== Reception ==
Brent Wells from The News & Advance stated "the first single 'Decay' is a hard-hitting number that ponders the state of the world. Primed with a propulsive groove and layers of chunky guitars, Witherspoon passionately roars, 'Decay/Cut the tongue you speak with to say/Don’t believe, don’t believe it/The wrong way on a path to somewhere/Don’t feed the selfish mouth of man.'"
