= A Spark of Light =

2018 novel by Jodi Picoult

- First edition (US)
- Author: Jodi Picoult
- Language: English
- Genre: Fiction
- Publisher: Ballantine Books (US); Hodder & Stoughton (UK); Allen & Unwin (CAN)
- Publication date: October 2, 2018
- Publication place: United States
- Pages: 400
- ISBN: 9780345545008
- Preceded by: Small Great Things
- Followed by: The Book of Two Ways

A Spark of Light is a 2018 contemporary novel by American writer Jodi Picoult. The plot of the book surrounds a shooting in a women's health clinic in Mississippi. A police negotiator bargains for the release of hostages including his teenage daughter. The book focuses on the father-daughter dynamic and the issue of abortion.
