= Harvesting the Heart =

1993 novel by Jodi Picoult

- First edition
- Author: Jodi Picoult
- Language: English
- Genre: Novel
- Publisher: Viking
- Publication date: 1993
- Publication place: United States
- Media type: Print ( Hardcover & Paperback )
- ISBN: 978-0-670-85099-0

Harvesting the Heart is the second novel by the American author Jodi Picoult, published in 1993 by Viking. The book has three parts: Conception, Growth, and Delivery.

== Synopsis ==
Paige O'Toole only has a few memories of her mother, who left her when she was five. One of the most vivid memories is of her mother painting winged horses on the ceiling of her childhood home. After Paige grows up, she marries Nicholas and becomes pregnant. She then starts to doubt her own maternal love and ability, because of her history and lack of maternal care and love as a child. After their son Max slips off the couch and gets a nosebleed, she flees and goes on a journey of self-discovery.

Paige revisits her childhood home in Chicago and tracks down her mother, now giving children horseback riding lessons. On this journey, Paige is able to understand more about her childhood and her mother, prompting her to eventually return home to her husband and child.

== Characters ==
- Paige O'Toole - Protagonist, described as, "sweet and innocent, but... plagued by unanswered questions", has an uncanny ability to sketch a subject's secrets into a portrait
- Nicholas Prescott - Harvard medical school graduate, successful cardiac surgeon, and husband of Paige
- Max Prescott - Son of Nicholas and Paige, named after his grandmother, May
- Astrid Prescott - Nicholas's mother, Paige's mother-in-law, and Max's grandmother
