= Perfect Picture =

Perfect Picture may refer to:

- Perfect Picture (album), 2023 album by British artist Hannah Diamond
- The Perfect Picture (2009 film), Ghanaian film written and produced by Shirley Frimpong-Manso
- The Perfect Picture: Ten Years Later, 2019 Ghanaian film written and produced by Shirley Frimpong-Manso

== See also ==
- Picture Perfect (disambiguation)
