= Perfect Match (novel) =

2002 novel by Jodi Picoult

- First edition
- Author: Jodi Picoult
- Language: English
- Publisher: Simon & Schuster
- Publication date: 27 May 2002
- Publication place: United States
- Media type: Print
- Pages: 368 pp
- ISBN: 0-7434-1872-7
- OCLC: 191753141

Perfect Match (2002) is the ninth novel by the American author Jodi Picoult. The novel explores the themes of family conflict, individual inner turmoil and guilt, personal and professional conflict, and vengeance. Though primarily, the novel focuses on child sexual abuse and (justifiable) murder. Unlike many of Picoult's other novels, Perfect Match does not follow the back-and-forth flashback format.

== Plot summary ==
The story begins with a prologue, in which an unnamed female character enters a courtroom and inexplicably shoots and kills the defendant as he approaches his defense attorney. The shooter is revealed to be Nina Frost, the York County, Maine, Assistant District Attorney, and the defendant is Father Glen Szyszynski, a priest at a church that Nina's family attends. At the time of the shooting, Nina believed that Szyszynski had sexually abused her five-year-old son, Nathaniel, after laboratory tests confirmed that Szyszynski's bodily fluids were found in the child's underpants.

It is later revealed that Nina had killed the wrong man, and a visiting priest named Father Gwynne, not Father Glen, had molested Nathaniel. However, Fathers Gwynne and Szyszynski shared the same DNA because Father Szyszynski had a bone marrow transplant from Father Gwynne (they were half brothers), leading to the belief that the semen on Nathaniel's underpants belonged to Szyszynski. Although this fact was entered into evidence at Nina's own murder trial, after which the jury could not reach a verdict, the judge ultimately ruled that Nina's reasons were justified. As such, Nina was found not guilty of murder. However, under Maine jurisprudence, Nina was found guilty of manslaughter because the judge believed she was under the influence of a reasonable fear or anger brought about by reasonable provocation. Nina was sentenced to 20 years in prison, but this sentence was suspended.

In a final twist at the end, Nina's best friend and colleague Patrick Ducharme moves away. Nina had a very brief affair with Patrick during a short split from her husband, Caleb. Nina also later discovers that Caleb had poisoned Father Gwynne with antifreeze, despite Caleb's earlier admonishment towards her killing Father Szyszynski.

== Main characters ==
- Nathaniel Patrick Frost: The five-year-old boy who is molested and whose confession about the abuse sparks the central conflict in the novel.
- Nina Maurier Frost: Nathaniel's mother, Caleb's wife, an assistant district attorney who kills Father Szyszynski.
- Caleb Frost: Nathaniel's father and Nina's husband, a stonemason who later poisons Father Gwynne and his cat.
- Patrick Ducharme: A police detective and close friend of Nina's. Patrick expresses his love for Nina on several occasions, but is constantly reminded that they cannot be together. He is a reoccurring character, also appearing in Picoult's novel, Nineteen Minutes.
- Father Gwynne: A visiting priest at the Frost's church who molests Nathaniel. He is later revealed to be Father Szyszynski's half-brother.
- Father Glen Szyszynski: A priest at the Frost's church that was falsely accused of molesting Nathaniel and murdered by Nina.

== Reception ==
A reviewer for Publishers Weekly was somewhat disappointed with the novel stating that "while the argument that the current system is flawed is solid, the only alternative offered is an iffy form of frontier justice that many readers may find unpalatable."

Kirkus added to the bleak feedback commenting "nicely written, but hopelessly contrived and generally unconvincing."

== See also ==
- Pedophilia
- Child sexual abuse
- Eyewitness testimony
- Catholic Church sex abuse scandal

== Other Links ==
- Hood, Ann, Breaking Faith, Review, The Washington Post; May 5, 2002; T.06
- Rhule, Patty, Love and hate are 'Perfect Match'; Mom turns vigilante after son's molestation, Review, USA Today; May 2, 2002
- Vidmos, Robin, Murder or Justice? D.A.'s vigilante action poses questions of pride, ethics and fairness, Review, The Denver Post, April 21, 2002; Page EE-01
