= House Rules (novel) =

2010 novel by Jodi Picoult

- First edition
- Author: Jodi Picoult
- Language: English
- Publisher: Atria
- Publication date: March 2, 2010
- Publication place: United States
- Media type: Print (hardcover)
- Pages: 532 pp
- ISBN: 978-0-7432-9643-4

House Rules (2010) is the eighteenth novel by the American author Jodi Picoult. The novel focuses on a young adult male, Jacob Hunt, with Asperger's syndrome living in Townshend, Vermont, who is accused of murder. The novel follows the struggle between Jacob and his family (consisting of his mother, Emma, and his younger brother, Theo), the law, and his disability.

== Plot ==
Eighteen-year-old Jacob Hunt lives with his mother Emma and his younger brother, Theo. Jacob has Asperger's syndrome, then considered a form of high-functioning autism. Jacob lives by a highly structured schedule and feels comfortable when all of his daily activities are pre-planned. Jacob thrives when he is able to engage in structured, focused activities, and he particularly enjoys things that are incredibly intellectual and academic. Emma is able to ensure that Jacob's anxiety and outbursts are infrequent by creating her and Theo's schedules around Jacob's needs. However, this often displeases Theo.

Jacob is deeply interested with forensic analysis to the point of obsession. The novel begins with Jacob setting up a crime scene (in which he plays the victim) for his mother to solve. Jacob is later accused of murdering his tutor, Jess Ogilvy. It is eventually revealed that Theo snuck into a house that Jess was house sitting at and startled her, causing her to accidentally hit her head on the sink and subsequently die.

When Jacob arrived at the home for his tutoring sessions, he staged a crime scene to make it appear as if Jess's boyfriend, Mark Maguire, had committed the murder, and then tried to make it appear as if it was a kidnapping. Eventually, Jacob is arrested for Jess's murder. During the trial, Jacob states that he staged the crime scene to take care of his brother, in accordance with a "house rule" set by Emma to take care of one another. Jacob asserts that if, by chance, the circumstances arose again, he would do it again for his brother.

== Characters ==
- Jacob Hunt – The eldest son of Emma, and Theo's brother. He has Asperger's syndrome and because of the way Jacob behaves and interacts with others, he is deemed suspicious by the police, and subsequently accused of murdering Jess Ogilvy, his social skills tutor.
- Emma Hunt – The single mother of Jacob and Theo Hunt. She works as an advice columnist for their town's local newspaper. Emma has devoted herself to her eldest son, Jacob, as a consequence of his disability. She creates a list of "House Rules" which stipulates the following: "Clean up your messes, tell the truth, brush your teeth twice a day, don't be late for school, and take care of your brother; he's the only one you've got."
- Theo Hunt – The 15-year-old younger brother of Jacob, who claims to be independent and rebellious.
- Rich Matson – The lead detective investigating the death of Jess.
- Oliver Bond – Jacob Hunt's attorney.
- Jess Ogilvy – Jacob's social skills tutor and the murder victim.
- Mark Maguire – Jess's abusive boyfriend and first suspect in her murder, who is later dismissed when Jacob is arrested.
- Judge Cuttings – The judge presiding over Jacob's murder trial.
- Helen Sharp – The prosecutor for Jacob Hunt's murder trial.

== Narrative style ==
House Rules is told through the perspective of five character voices, including, Emma, Theo, Jacob, Rich, and Oliver. Each chapter is a character's perspective of a particular event unfolding in their lives. Additionally, each character's narrative is assigned a different font. Picoult frequently uses this narrative technique in her novels, including in, My Sister's Keeper, Songs of the Humpback Whale, Change of Heart, Sing You Home, and Handle with Care.

== Murders discussed ==
The novel contains short discussions of murder(s) committed by real murderers, including: Ted Bundy, Richard Crafts, Christopher Hightower, Darryl Littlejohn, Jeffrey MacDonald, Stella Nickell, Dorothea Puente, Dennis Rader, Gary Ridgway, and Bill Sybers.

== Reception ==
Kirkus Reviews described the novel as "worth the read for the detailed dramatization of Asperger’s; however, like Jacob, the reader will solve this whodunit far in advance of the principals."
