= Jodi Picoult =

American author (born 1966)

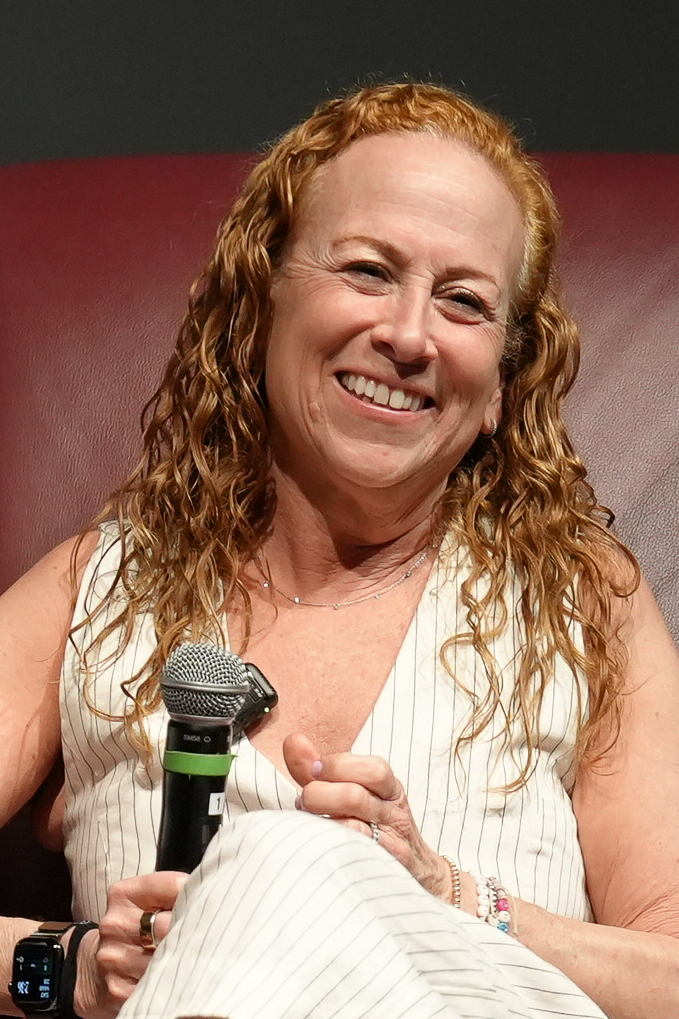
- Picoult at San Diego Writers Festival 2026
- Born: 1966 (age 59–60); Nesconset, New York, U.S.
- Education: Princeton University (AB); Harvard University (MA)
- Occupation: Novelist
- Spouse: Timothy Warren van Leer (m. 1989)
- Children: 3
- Writing career
- Period: 1992–present
- Website: jodipicoult.com

Jodi Lynn Picoult (/ˈpiːkoʊ/ PEE-koh; born 1966) is an American writer. As of 2026, Picoult has published 30 novels, several short stories, and has also written several issues of Wonder Woman. Approximately 40 million copies of her books are in print worldwide and have been translated into 34 languages. In 2003, she was awarded the New England Bookseller Award for fiction.

Picoult writes fiction which has been characterized as family saga, frequently centering storylines with moral dilemmas or procedural dramas which pit family members against one another. Over her writing career, Picoult has covered a wide range of controversial issues, including abortion, the Holocaust, assisted suicide, race relations, eugenics, LGBT rights, fertility issues, religion, the death penalty, and school shootings. Picoult has been described by Janet Maslin as "a solid, lively storyteller, even if she occasionally bogs down in lyrical turns of phrase."

== Early life ==
Picoult was born in Nesconset, New York, on Long Island in 1966. She has one younger brother. She graduated from Smithtown High School East in June 1983. She has described her family as "non-practicing Jewish". Picoult wrote her first story at age five, titled "The Lobster Which Misunderstood". Picoult's mother and grandmother were both teachers and had an important influence on her.

== Education ==
Picoult studied creative writing at Princeton University with Mary Morris, and graduated in 1987 with an A.B. in English after completing a senior thesis titled Developments. She published two short stories in Seventeen magazine while still in college. Immediately after graduation, she began a variety of jobs, ranging from editing textbooks to teaching eighth-grade English. She earned a master's degree in education from Harvard University.

Picoult has received two honorary Doctor of Letters degrees: one from Dartmouth College in 2010, the other from the University of New Haven in 2012. In 2016, Picoult was selected to be Princeton's Class Day Speaker before commencement.

== Career ==
Picoult expanded her writing beyond novels in 2007 when she became the writer of the DC Comics series Wonder Woman (vol. 3), following the departure of Allan Heinberg. Her first issue, number 6, was released on March 28, 2007, and her last was issue number 10, released on June 27, 2007.

That same year, her novel Nineteen Minutes, which is about the aftermath of a school shooting in a small town, published on March 9, 2007, was her first book to debut at number 1 on the New York Times Best Seller list. Change of Heart was published on March 4, 2008, Handle with Care in 2009, and House Rules in 2010, all of which also reached number 1 on the list.

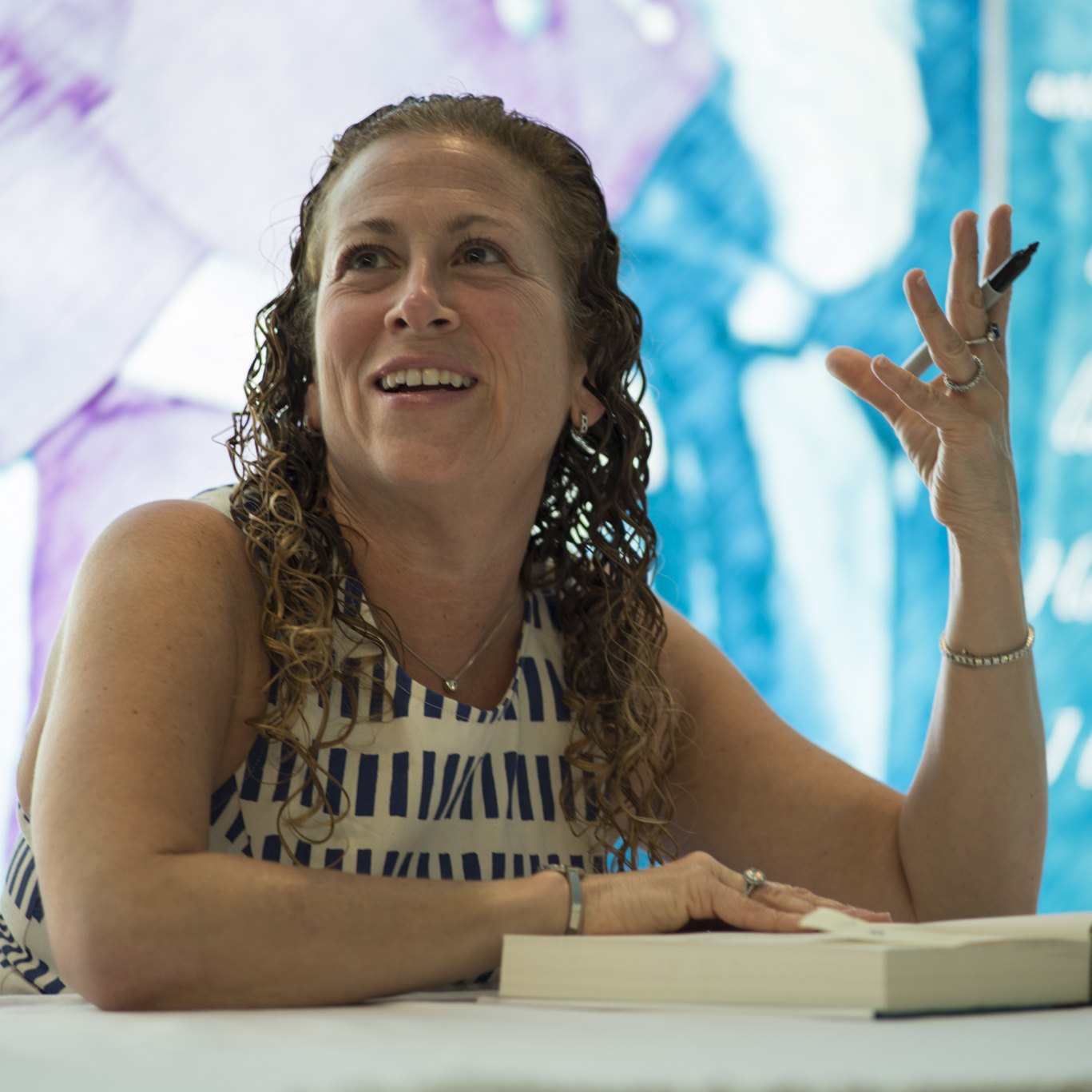
Picoult as the 2013 Harry Middleton Lecturer at the LBJ Presidential Library

Picoult's work is often categorized as chick lit. She has claimed to accept a lack of critical acclaim in exchange for popularity: "I'm never going to win the Nobel Prize for Literature, not going to win a National Book Award, never even going to be nominated. What you trade for that is sales and readership. And I would rather reach more people."

In November 2019, Picoult was involved in a widely reported online controversy with Brooke Nelson, a college student who was mentioned in her local newspaper as saying she thought that author Sarah Dessen's YA novels were not suitable for the Common Read program run by Northern State University, Aberdeen. Instead she advocated for the inclusion of Just Mercy, a memoir by civil rights attorney Bryan Stevenson. Picoult described Nelson's views as "sinister" and "demeaning to women", and encouraged her followers on Twitter to "fight the patriarchy" in response to Nelson's comments. When the story was reported in Jezebel, The Guardian, The Washington Post, and Slate, Picoult posted an apology on Twitter, noting that her remarks had resulted in harassment of Nelson.

Her 2024 novel By Any Other Name is based on the premise that the poet Emilia Lanier was the author of several works traditionally attributed to William Shakespeare. In the publication of the book, Picoult raises alternate theories of Shakespeare authorship, claiming that the name "William Shakespeare" functioned as a collective identity for many different types of authors. Picoult characterizes Shakespeare's identity as a literary in-joke whose context was lost over time, and argues that the widely accepted Stratfordian Shakespeare could not have written the protofeminist characters in many of his works. The novel's premise was widely rejected by Shakespearean historians.

== Advocacy ==
=== Representation in literary arts ===
Since 2013, Picoult has been member of the inaugural Writers Council of the National Writing Project, an organization that aims to provide professional development opportunities for writing teachers and expand opportunities for underrepresented youths to write and publish about topics important to them. Picoult was also a member of the advisory board of feminist nonprofit VIDA: Women in Literary Arts.

=== Book banning ===
Throughout 2023, Picoult was an outspoken critic of book bannings across the United States, particularly Florida. In March of that year, 92 titles—20 of which were authored by Picoult—were removed from Florida's Martin County School District for review for potentially "inappropriate" content.

In an op-ed, Picoult challenged the characterization of such books as "adult romance," arguing that they address topics such as racism, abortion rights, gun control, and gay rights, "that encourage kids to think for themselves."

During the summer of 2023, the Urbandale Community School District in Iowa reviewed her novel Nineteen Minutes under a new law banning books with sex acts from school libraries. The book, which focuses on a school shooting, was one of 374 books considered by the district for removal. According to PEN America, Nineteen Minutes was one of the most banned books during the 2023–2024 academic year.

In 2024, Picoult worked with the organization Unite Against Book Bans on a series of book tour events, where speakers focused on the issue of book censorship and provided resource kits to attendees.

=== Trumbull Hall Troupe ===
In 2004, Picoult co-founded Trumbull Hall Troupe with Marjorie Rose to provide a fun, educational theater experience for youths in the Upper Valley, while also supporting charitable causes. The troupe consists of students in grades ranging from six through twelve, who are selected through an audition process. In its early years, the troupe, performed original shows written by Picoult and composed by the troupe's former musical director Ellen Wilbur. Since 2016, the troupe has performed licensed musicals and donates 100 percent of net proceeds to its charities.

In addition to performances, troupe members run in CHAD Hero, an annual 5K race for Children's Hospital at Dartmouth Hitchcock Medical Center, write to orphans in Zimbabwe through the Zienzele Foundation, and run theater workshops for children at the Upper Valley Haven.

== Honors and awards ==
- New England Bookseller Award for Fiction (2003)
- Alex Award (2005)
- BookBrowse Award for Best Book (2005)
- Association of Illinois School Library Educators Illinois Teen Readers' Choice Lincoln Award (2006)
- Cosmopolitan Fearless Fiction Award (2007)
- Vermont Green Mountain Book Award (2007)
- Virginia State Reading Association Readers' Choice Award (2007)
- Maryland Association of School Librarians Black-Eyed Susan Award (2007)
- Princeton Alumni Weekly "Most Influential Alumni" list (2017)
- Richards Free Library Sarah Josepha Hale Award (2019)
- Keene State College Granite State Award (2025)

== Personal life ==
Picoult is married to Timothy Warren van Leer, whom she met in college. They reside in Hanover, New Hampshire. They have three children and three grandchildren. Picoult has published two books with her daughter Samantha.

== Recurring characters ==
- Jordan McAfee, his son Thomas, and his wife, Selena, are featured in the novels The Pact, Salem Falls, Nineteen Minutes, and Mad Honey.
- Detective Patrick Ducharme is featured in Perfect Match and Nineteen Minutes.
- Ian Fletcher of Keeping Faith makes a brief appearance in Change of Heart.
- Frankie Martine, first featured in Salem Falls, returns in Second Glance and Perfect Match.
- Nina Frost, a main character in Perfect Match, makes a cameo in Nineteen Minutes.
- Peter Houghton, a main character in Nineteen Minutes, is mentioned briefly in House Rules and Mad Honey.

== Published works ==
- Songs of the Humpback Whale (1992)
- Harvesting the Heart (1993)
- Picture Perfect (1995)
- Mercy (1996)
- The Pact (1998)
- Keeping Faith (1999)
- Plain Truth (2001)
- Salem Falls (2001)
- Perfect Match (2002)
- Second Glance (2003)
- My Sister's Keeper (2004)
- Vanishing Acts (2005)
- The Tenth Circle (2006)
- Nineteen Minutes (2007)
- Wonder Woman (vol. 3) #6–10 (cover date: late May 2007 – August 2007)
- Wonder Woman: Love and Murder (2007) (hardcover and softcover volume collecting Wonder Woman #6–10)
- Change of Heart (2008)
- Handle with Care (2009)
- House Rules (2010)
- Leaving Home: Short Pieces (2011)
- Sing You Home (2011)
- Between the Lines, co-written with Samantha van Leer (2012)
- Lone Wolf (2012)
- The Storyteller (2013)
- Leaving Time (2014)
- Off the Page, co-written with Samantha van Leer (2015)
- Small Great Things (2016)
- A Spark of Light (2018)
- The Book of Two Ways (2020)
- Wish You Were Here (2021)
- Mad Honey, co-written with Jennifer Finney Boylan (2022)
- By Any Other Name (2024)
- Hollow Bones (2026)

== Film and television adaptations ==
- The Pact (2002) (Lifetime original movie)
- Plain Truth (2004) (Lifetime original movie)
- The Tenth Circle (2008) (Lifetime original movie)
- My Sister's Keeper (2009) (feature film)
- Salem Falls (2011) (Lifetime original movie)

Preceded by Allan Heinberg	Wonder Woman writer 2007	Succeeded by Gail Simone
