= Sing You Home =

2011 novel by Jodi Picoult

- Cover of hardcover 1st edition
- Author: Jodi Picoult
- Publisher: Atria Books
- Publication date: 2011-03-01
- Media type: Print (Hardcover)
- Pages: 480
- ISBN: 978-1-4391-0272-5

Sing You Home (2011) is the nineteenth novel by the American author Jodi Picoult. The novel was released on March 1, 2011, and follows the story of a bisexual woman fighting for the right to use the frozen embryos she created with her ex-husband with her new wife. The novel features a companion soundtrack CD of ten original songs with lyrics written by Picoult, and music by her best friend, Ellen Wilber. Wilber also performs the songs on the CD in the voice of the story's main character, Zoe Baxter.

== Plot ==
Zoe Baxter, a music therapist, and her husband, Max, have tried to have children for the past decade, but cannot due to fertility issues. Zoe has experienced multiple miscarriages during five rounds of in vitro fertilization and eventually learns that she suffers from polyendocrine metabolic ovarian syndrome (PMOS) (known in the book by the condition's previous name of polycystic ovary syndrome (PCOS)). Max learns that he has a genetic condition that leads to infertility. After two miscarriages, Zoe successfully becomes pregnant, but loses the baby late in her pregnancy, during her baby shower. Zoe and Max soon divorce because Max doesn't want Zoe to pressure him into continuing to try for a child.

Zoe struggles to recover from the loss of another baby and the shock of the divorce. Max has since moved in with his brother, Reid, and his sister-in-law, Liddy. Reid and Liddy are devout Christians who are also trying to have children, and have similarly experienced several miscarriages because of the Baxter men's infertility. Initially, Max is hostile to Reid, Liddy, and Pastor Clive's efforts to convert him to Evangelical Christianity, but he eventually warms up to the church and becomes a born-again Christian.

Zoe eventually meets Vanessa Shaw, an openly gay woman. They quickly become friends and eventually fall in love. Zoe runs into Max at the grocery store, and tells him that she and Vanessa are dating. Max is shocked and disgusted, and admits to Pastor Clive that he fears Zoe "turned" to lesbianism because he was not enough of a man to satisfy her.

Soon after the incident, Zoe and Vanessa marry. Zoe still wants to have a child, but must have a hysterectomy after she is diagnosed with endometrial cancer. Vanessa suggests that she could carry one of Zoe's frozen embryos, and Zoe readily agrees. Zoe and Vanessa learn that since the embryos are Max's too, Max must agree for Zoe and Vanessa to use the embryos. Zoe asks Max if he will agree to the use of the embryos, and Max tells her he will think about it. Zoe and Vanessa, thinking that Max is surely going to agree, begin thinking of names and furnishing the baby's room. Meanwhile, Zoe is working with a rebellious teenage girl named Lucy, who is hostile and angry.

Max consults Pastor Clive, who tells him that no child should be subjected to being raised in a same-sex household. Pastor Clive urges Max to sue Zoe and Vanessa for the parental rights of the embryos so that Reid and Liddy can use them instead. Max agrees, and sues Zoe and Vanessa.

Zoe is incredulous at Max's betrayal. She and Vanessa hire their own lawyer, Angela Moretti, who specializes in gay and lesbian cases. In turn, Max and Pastor Clive enlist legal help from Wade Preston, a Christian lawyer, and Ben Benjamin.

A judge known to be hostile to LGBT rights is assigned to the trial. Initially, he seems to side with Zoe and Vanessa, but then Max's legal team alleges that Lucy—who is Pastor Clive's stepdaughter, which Zoe was unaware of—was molested by Zoe. The allegation is untrue, but Zoe is distraught and agrees to let Max have sole parental rights over the embryos.

Max eventually realizes that he is in love with Liddy, and that he is incapable of acting as an uncle figure while she and Reid raise his genetic child. He changes his mind and gives the embryos to Zoe and Vanessa to raise as their own. Zoe and Vanessa allow Max to have a paternal role in the child's life.

The epilogue is set seven years in the future, through the eyes of Samantha "Sammy" Baxter. Sammy is six years old, has a dog named Ollie, and calls her mothers "Mama Ness" and "Mommy Zoe". Sammy defends her mothers against bullying remarks made by her classmates. She reveals that Liddy and Max are together and plan on getting married. In the end, Sammy relays that she is a very happy child, and is, really, the luckiest little girl in the world.

== Characters ==
Zoe Baxter: A music therapist for burn victims, individuals with Alzheimer's disease, and hospice patients. Previously married to Max, and then Vanessa. Samantha's mother.

Max Baxter: Zoe's ex-husband, a spiraling alcoholic who is eventually saved by the local Evangelical church and Pastor Clive. Samantha's biological father.

Vanessa Shaw: An openly gay guidance counselor, Zoe's eventual wife, and Samantha's mother.

Clive Lincoln: An overzealous and charismatic Evangelical Christian pastor, deeply opposed to gay marriage and LGBTQ rights.

Lucy: Pastor Clive's step-daughter, and an adolescent that Zoe is helping with music therapy. She falsely accuses Zoe of molesting her.

Angela Moretti: Zoe and Vanessa's lawyer, who specializes in gay and lesbian legal cases.

Wade Preston: A Christian lawyer, hired by Pastor Clive for Max's lawsuit against Zoe and Vanessa.

Samantha "Sammy" Baxter: Zoe and Vanessa's young daughter, also Max's biological daughter.

Ollie: Sammy's dog.

== Narrative style ==
Sing You Home is told from multiple alternating character perspectives. This narrative style entails characters taking turns to narrate the events in their lives from differing perspectives. Each chapter is told through the perspective of either Zoe, Max, Vanessa, and Samatha, and each character's narrative is told in a different font. Picoult often employs this writing technique, including in, Songs of the Humpback Whale, My Sister's Keeper, Change of Heart, and House Rules.

== Film adaptation ==
Ellen DeGeneres acquired the rights to the book in order to turn it into a film. DeGeneres will be producing the film along with Craig Zaden and Neil Meron.
