= Plain Truth (novel) =

2001 novel by Jodi Picoult

- Plain Truth
- Author: Jodi Picoult
- Language: English
- Genre: Novel
- Publisher: Washington Square Press
- Publication date: April 3, 2001
- Publication place: United States
- Media type: Print (Hardcover & Paperback)
- Pages: 405 pp
- ISBN: 0-671-77613-4
- OCLC: 36620856

Plain Truth (2001) is the seventh novel written by the American author Jodi Picoult. The story follows a murder on an Amish farm.

== Plot summary ==
The novel recounts the story of how a dead infant found on an Amish farm in Pennsylvania rocks the entire community. As the police investigate the death, they discover that the baby was not stillborn, but instead had died shortly after birth. Police were able to find cloth fibers in the infant's mouth and throat, including bruises on the mouth, which leads them to conclude that he was suffocated. An 18-year-old, unmarried Amish girl, Katie Fisher, is charged with the murder of her newborn son. However, Katie denies ever being pregnant. Ellie Hathaway, an experienced defense attorney and a distant relative of Katie, reluctantly accepts the case after a confrontation with her aunt (the relative who connects Ellie with Katie by marriage). As part of the bail conditions of the pre-trial hearing, Ellie has to remain on the farm with Katie prior to the trial—a period that lasts several months.

A doctor is able to determine that the infant was born prematurely, and could have died from natural causes due to listeriosis, a bacterial infection that Katie contracted from drinking unpasteurized milk from their Amish dairy farm. During that time, Ellie begins a relationship with her former lover Coop, a legal psychologist whom she trusts with Katie's interviews, and whom she had previously left years before. Coincidentally, on the first day of Katie's trial, Ellie finds out she is pregnant with Coop's baby. Coop then asks Ellie to marry him, but she defers. After the jury deliberates for several days, Katie instead chooses to settle for a plea agreement and is sentenced to one year of electronic monitoring, which allows her to stay at the farm while wearing an electronic bracelet.

Katie's mother, Sarah Fisher, gives Ellie the scissors that were used to cut the umbilical cord, revealing that she knew Katie was pregnant and had gone to her the night she gave birth, though Katie didn't know. Ellie has an ethical obligation as an attorney to provide this evidence to the police, but instead, she opts not to because of Sarah's plea to her - mother-to-mother. The novel ends with Coop picking up Ellie from the Fisher dairy farm to begin their life together.

== Characters ==
- Katie Fisher: Protagonist; an unmarried 18-year-old Amish girl. After giving birth to a baby that was later found dead, she is accused and arrested for murder.
- Ellie Hathaway: A 39-year-old lawyer. Ellie is distantly related to Katie through their aunt.
- Coop: Ellie's ex-boyfriend, a psychiatrist, and the father of Ellie's unborn child.
- Jacob Fisher: Katie's older brother, he was excommunicated from the church for continuing schooling and giving up his Amish ways.
- Aaron Fisher: Katie's father, and owner of the dairy farm, he is extremely rigid and fundamentalist in his views on religion.
- Sarah Fisher: Katie's mother, she truly loves her children, and would do anything for them, though she follows her husband's strict belief system in an effort to not upset the church.
- Adam Sinclair: A friend of Jacob's in college, it's revealed that he is the father of Katie's baby.
- Samuel Stoltzfus: An Amish boy who works for Katie's father, Aaron Fisher, he is also Katie's boyfriend, and seems to love her.
- Leda: Katie's aunt and Sarah Fisher's sister who was once excommunicated, but now serves as the Fishers' confidant (excluding Aaron Fisher).

== Reception ==
Publishers Weekly had a mixed review of the novel, saying, "told from both third-person omniscient and first-person (Ellie's) vantages, the story rolls leisurely through the trial preparations, the results of which are repeated, tediously, in the courtroom. Perhaps the story's quietude is appropriate, given its magnificently painted backdrop and distinctive characters, but one can't help wishing that the spark igniting the book's opening pages had built into a full-fledged blaze."

However, Kristina Lanier wrote a more positive review for the Christian Science Monitor, saying, "Picoult sets a big task for herself in 'Plain Truth', but she pulls it off - avoiding sentimentality and even maintaining the cultural tension and thriller-like guessing game into the book's final scenes. Picoult's strength, though, lies in sculpting solid characters and a thoughtful, well-researched, and well-paced yarn."

Plain Truth was Book of the Week in the May 8, 2000 issue of People Magazine. The review of the book, written by Jill Smolowe stated, "despite the occasional cliche and a coda that feels artificially tacked on, Picoult's seventh novel never loses its grip. The research is convincing, the plotting taut, the scenes wonderfully vivid. Most impressive, the author gets beneath the uniformities of dress, custom and conduct to paint a unique community--closed to most Americans--in all its social and psychological complexity."

== Film, TV and Theatrical adaptations ==
In 2004, Lifetime debuted the Plain Truth, the television adaption of the novel, starring Mariska Hargitay as the attorney Ellie Hathaway (whose name was changed to Ellie Harrison in the film), and Alison Pill as the accused and disowned Amish girl, Katie Fisher (whose name was changed to Katie Fitch in the film).
