= Handle with Care (novel) =

2009 novel by Jodi Picoult

- First edition
- Author: Jodi Picoult
- Language: English
- Publisher: Atria
- Publication date: March 3, 2009
- Publication place: United States
- Media type: Print (hardback & paperback)
- Pages: 496 pp
- ISBN: 978-0-7432-9641-0

Handle with Care (2009) is the 17th novel by the American author Jodi Picoult. It debuted at #1 on The New York Times Best Seller list.

== Plot ==
The story follows the life of a young girl, Willow O'Keefe, and her family. Willow has Type III osteogenesis imperfecta (OI), a disease also known as brittle bone syndrome. To her parents, Sean and Charlotte O'Keefe, the disease has meant many sleepless nights, mounting hospital and insurance bills, and the pitying stares of "luckier" parents.

After a disastrous vacation to Walt Disney World that results in Willow severely breaking both of her femora, Sean and Charlotte visit a lawyer to inquire about a lawsuit against the park and hospital after staff thought that Willow's broken bones indicated child abuse. The lawyer, Marin Gates, mentions a different possibility: a wrongful birth lawsuit against the OB/GYN that treated Charlotte during her pregnancy. Essentially, if the O'Keefe's had known earlier that their fetus had OI, they would have been equipped with all the information needed to choose whether or not to have the pregnancy aborted. However, the OB/GYN the O'Keefes are suing is Piper Reece, Charlotte's best friend.

Amelia, Charlotte's eldest daughter from a previous relationship with a drug addict, develops bulimia and begins to self-harm, partially due to the stress of her home life. Sean considers a divorce after countless disagreements with Charlotte about the lawsuit, but they eventually reconcile.

During the trial, it is revealed that at an 18-week ultrasound, there was evidence of OI that Piper should have informed Charlotte about. The jury awards $8 million to the O'Keefes. This forces Piper to leave her practice and take up a part-time job at a free health clinic. Marin, the O'Keefe's lawyer, is trying to track down her birth parents over the course of the trial. She discovers that her birth mother is on the jury and it is later revealed that Marin was a product of rape.

The final chapter is narrated by Willow. She begins first grade, and is going to a camp for kids with OI. Amelia received treatment for her eating disorder and returned home healthy and with a passion for painting. Charlotte, who used to be a pastry chef, wrote a recipe book and is donating all of the profits to the OI Foundation. Sean and Charlotte put the check aside for when they might really need it. Willow has always been jealous of her sister because she is a brilliant ice skater.

One day, Willow wanders alone to the frozen pond in the backyard and tries to crawl over it carefully. However, the thin ice breaks under her weight and she drowns. Willow mentions how, this time, it was not her that broke. The story concludes with Charlotte burying the $8 million check with Willow.

== Characters ==
Charlotte O'Keefe - The mother of Willow and Amelia O'Keefe. She files a lawsuit against Piper Reece, her obstetrician/gynaecologist and best friend, in order to be able to secure the medical resources needed for Willow. The lawsuit is successful and she is awarded $8 million in damages. After Willow's death, she tucks the check into the lining of Willow's coffin, never cashing it.

Sean O'Keefe - Charlotte's husband, Willow's father and Amelia's stepfather. He is a police officer who works hard to support his family. Although he initially attempts to set aside his personal feelings about the lawsuit in order to support Charlotte, his disgust for the wrongful birth suit eventually leads him to testify for the defense. He files for divorce from Charlotte, but they eventually reconcile.

Willow O'Keefe - A young girl born with osteogenesis imperfecta. She is extremely intelligent and often reads while recovering from a bone break. During the lawsuit, she worries that her parents do not want her anymore because she is not perfect. At the end of the novel, she attempts to go skating on a frozen pond, but the ice breaks and she drowns. As she sinks deeper in the water, she reflects on her short life: how she was loved, and profoundly, that this time, it was not her that broke.

Amelia O'Keefe - Willow's older half-sister, who is overshadowed by her sister's illness. Amelia falls in love with a boy who has the same disease as her sister, whom she meets at an OI convention. She lies and tells the boy that she is the one with OI, but he finds out. Eventually, the differences in their health lead to the boy breaking up with her, which further pushes her into isolation, as her parents are occupied by the lawsuit. Amelia develops bulimia and begins to self-harm. She begins shoplifting and dyes her hair blue. Sean eventually discovers Amelia's eating disorder, after Piper brings them to his attention when the pipes burst in their home due to being eroded by the stomach acid (caused by her frequent vomiting). Charlotte suggests that Amelia should check into a treatment center. Amelia, furious with her mother, testifies in court that Charlotte told Willow that she would never wish that Willow had never been born. Charlotte admits later that they should have discussed the treatment center as a family before she and Sean made that kind of decision.

Marin Gates - The lawyer handling the O'Keefes' case, although she is privately opposed to it. She is adopted and searches for her birth mother, who she eventually discovers by chance on the jury for Charlotte's case. However, her mother confides to her that she was the product of rape, and makes it clear that she does not want a relationship with her. Marin accepts this and becomes more appreciative and closer to her adoptive parents.

Piper Reece - Charlotte's best friend and obstetrician/gynaecologist, as well Willow's godmother. She is a competent doctor, although this is called into question during the trial. She is forced to take an extended leave from work during the lawsuit. She brings Amelia's bulimia and self-harming to Sean's attention.

Rob Reece - Piper's husband. He is an orthodontist whose patients include many people from the town of Bankton, including Amelia. His older brother, Stephen, died by suicide at the age of 17; then-12-year-old Rob discovered his brother's body. Although the lawsuit initially causes strain in their marriage, Rob ultimately supports his wife.

Emma Reece - Piper and Rob's daughter. She met Amelia through skating and became her best friend. However, she quickly casts Amelia aside after Charlotte sues Piper and the two never reconcile. When she finds out about the lawsuit, she is able to persuade the other students to alienate Amelia. She was the first person to notice Amelia's self-harming.

== Narrative style ==
Handle with Care employs an alternating narrative style, in which various characters take turns narrating chapters and providing their perspective on the events that are unfolding. The novel is narrated by Charlotte, Sean, Marin, Piper, Amelia and the final chapter by Willow. Picoult has used this technique in several novels, including Songs of the Humpback Whale, My Sister's Keeper, Change of Heart and House Rules.

== Reception ==
People magazine gave the book four stars. The Washington Post called it "a great read, with strong characters, an exciting lawsuit to pull you along and really good use of the medical context". However, The Boston Globe called the novel "fairly engaging if sometimes [an] arduous read".
