= Keeping Faith =

1999 novel by Jodi Picoult

- First edition
- Author: Jodi Picoult
- Language: English
- Publisher: William Morrow
- Publication date: May 1999
- Publication place: United States
- Media type: Print ( Hardcover & Paperback )
- Pages: 432
- ISBN: 0-688-16825-6

Keeping Faith (1999) is the sixth novel by the bestselling American author Jodi Picoult. The book is about a custody battle involving a seven-year-old girl, Faith White, who may be seeing God.

== Plot summary ==
When Mariah White catches her husband, Colin White, having an affair with another woman for the second time in their marriage, he files for divorce and gives her full custody of their child, Faith. After the divorce, Mariah becomes deeply depressed, while Faith develops an imaginary friend called her "Guard". Not long after, Faith begins to quote passages from the Bible, which she has never read. It is at this point that her mother takes her to see a therapist, fearing for her sanity. The therapist finds that Faith may in fact be seeing God.

News of Faith's visions (or images of God) reach Ian Fletcher, a "Teleatheist", who is travelling around the United States to debunk "miracles" that feature God. Ian shows up at the Whites' house, where he has a confrontation with Millie Epstein, Faith's grandmother. This exchange later leads to Millie having a heart attack and upon arriving at the hospital being pronounced dead. About an hour later Faith kisses her grandmother goodbye, and raises her back to life. This further increases the attention that Faith receives from the public, with complete strangers and media representatives surrounding the house, making it impossible for Faith and her mother to continue on with their lives as normal.

Faith performs a few other miracles, including healing a baby with AIDS and showing what appear to be stigmata. Colin, hearing of the commotion surrounding his daughter, sues Mariah for custody of Faith. Mariah and Faith flee to Kansas City, where they are confronted by Ian, who is visiting his autistic brother, Michael. Mariah and Faith end up staying with Ian, who promises Mariah that he will not betray them and that he will provide them with accommodation. After a confrontation with Faith trying to "heal" Michael, Ian becomes enraged. However, Mariah and Ian appear to have fallen in love. After hearing from Millie that Colin is suing her, Mariah takes Faith back home. Meanwhile, Faith is admitted to the hospital again and her mother is prevented from seeing her by the court. At this point, Faith's symptoms begin to worsen, eventually leaving her near death. Upon being reunited with her mother her health increases drastically, and in the end, Mariah is awarded custody. The holes that appeared in Faith's hands disappear, and her "Guard" vanishes. Mariah and Ian begin a romantic relationship, and they and Faith eventually live together as a family. At the end of the novel, it remains unclear whether the "Guard" is really gone forever, or is still with Faith.

== Main characters ==
- Faith White: Protagonist; the little girl who begins to see and speak to God, otherwise referred to as her "Guard".
- Mariah White: Faith's mother.
- Ian Fletcher: The "teleatheist" who arrives at the home of the Whites' in an effort to disprove Faith's claims of seeing and speaking to God; begins a relationship with Mariah.
- Millie Epstein: Mariah's mother, she died of a heart attack, but after being kissed by Faith came back to life.
- Colin White: Faith's father, sues Mariah (his ex-wife) for custody of Faith.

== Connections ==
Ian Fletcher is featured in the 2008 novel by Jodi Picoult, Change of Heart. Faith and Mariah also make a brief appearance. The novel reveals that Ian and Mariah married and had twin boys together. Faith seems to no longer have a connection to her "Guard".

== Reception ==
Kirkus delivered a review full of praise stating that the novel is a "sweetly affirmative portrait of mother-daughter love that explores big questions while also providing a riveting narrative of a custody battle." And they also extended the praise to the writer by saying "Picoult offers a perfectly pitched take on the great mysteries of the heart."

In agreement, Laura Gross delivered a review on behalf of Publishers Weekly predicting that the "fans of Picoult's fluent and absorbing storytelling will welcome her new novel, which, like Harvesting the Heart, explores family dynamics and the intricacies of motherhood."

== See also ==
- Visions of Jesus and Mary
- Perceptions of religious imagery in natural phenomena
- Religious delusions
