= Between the Lines (novel) =

2012 novel by Jodi Picoult and Samantha Van Leer

- Author: Jodi Picoult
- Language: English
- Genre: Fiction
- Published: Simon & Schuster
- Publisher: Simon Pulse (first edition)
- Publication date: June 26, 2012
- Publication place: United States
- Media type: Print (paperback)
- Pages: 368 pp (first edition)
- ISBN: 9781451635751 (first edition)
- OCLC: 1090910605
- Followed by: Off the Page

Between the Lines is a young adult (YA) fiction novel co-written by the American author Jodi Picoult and her daughter, Samantha Van Leer. Between the Lines is Picoult's first YA novel and Van Leer's first published work. The novel was published on June 26, 2012 by Simon Pulse, an imprint of Simon and Schuster. Picoult and Van Leer authored a sequel called Off the Page, which was released in 2015 by Delacorte Press.

== Synopsis ==
Delilah, a 15-year-old teenager, bookworm, and social outcast is obsessed with a fairy tale story about Prince Oliver called Between the Lines. No one is able to understand Delilah's obsession with a book written for children. Delilah's parents are divorced, and her best friend is a punk-rocker named Jules, who is an outcast of her own choosing.

Delilah feels caught between her erratic family life and her loneliness at school. While Delilah loves her over-protective mother dearly, she also wishes for something more. Delilah creates a vision of what her father must be like, as she has never known him. All she knows about her father is that he left when she was a baby, and that he has his own life.

Delilah's nemesis is the most popular girl in school, Ally McAndrews.

Delilah confides her worries to Prince Oliver and is shocked when he suddenly begins to talk back to her. Before long, Delilah and Oliver forge a bond neither has experienced before, and they begin to fall in love.

== Recognition ==
In 2013, Between the Lines was nominated for the Young Adult Library Services Association's "Teen's Top Ten Award".

== Adaptation ==
Between the Lines was adapted into a musical in 2017 at Kansas City Repertory Theatre. It premiered Off-Broadway for a limited run at the Tony Kiser Theater beginning June 14, 2022 with an official opening on July 10, after being postponed due to the COVID-19 pandemic. The show closed on September 11, 2022.
