= Picture Perfect (Sevendust song) =

Single by Sevendust

from the album Black Out the Sun
- Released: August 6, 2013
- Studio: Architekt Music (Butler, New Jersey)
- Genre: Alternative metal
- Length: 3:47
- Label: 7Bros./ADA
- Songwriters: John Connolly; Vinnie Hornsby; Clint Lowery; Morgan Rose; Lajon Witherspoon
- Producer: Sevendust

Sevendust singles chronology
"Decay" (2013)	"Picture Perfect" (2013)	"Black" (2014)

"Picture Perfect" is a song by the American rock band Sevendust. It was released as the second single from their ninth studio album, Black Out the Sun on August 6, 2013.

== Song meaning ==
John Connolly described the meaning behind the song as "Picture Perfect is talking about being wronged by somebody. But at the end of the day, it's about your own point of view. Your picture perfect point of view is the only one you have got".

== Personnel ==
Sevendust

- Lajon Witherspoon – lead vocals
- Clint Lowery – lead guitars, backing vocals
- John Connolly – rhythm guitars
- Vinnie Hornsby – bass guitar
- Morgan Rose – drums, backing vocals

Production

- Mike Ferretti – engineer

== Charts ==
Chart (2013)	Peak position
US Mainstream Rock Songs (Billboard)	25
