= Plain Truth (film) =

2004 American television drama film

- Written by: Jodi Picoult
- Screenplay by: Matthew Tabak
- Directed by: Paul Shapiro
- Starring: Mariska Hargitay; Alison Pill; Jan Niklas
- Music by: Yves Laferrière
- Country of origin: United States
- Original language: English

Production
- Producer: Michael Mahoney
- Cinematography: David Greene
- Editor: Michael Pacek
- Running time: 90 minutes
- Production company: Muse Entertainment Enterprises

Original release
- Release: October 4, 2004

Plain Truth is a 2004 TV drama directed by Paul Shapiro, starring Mariska Hargitay, Alison Pill and Jan Niklas. The film is based on Jodi Picoult's book Plain Truth, in which an Amish teen hides a pregnancy, gives birth in secret, and then flatly denies it all when the baby's body is found. An urban defense attorney, Ellie Harrison, decides to represent her when she's charged with murder.

== Plot summary ==
Katie (Alison Pill) is an 18-year-old girl who lives in a small Amish community in the Pennsylvania farm country. When a newborn baby is found dead, police suspect foul play. Katie is accused of having given birth to the child and then murdering it due to her shame about the baby's illegitimacy. Katie protests her innocence on both charges, and Ellie Harrison (Mariska Hargitay), a tough and well-respected attorney, is brought in to defend her in court. Eventually it is revealed that Katie had conceived the child by a young male academic student whom she had befriended while visiting her excommunicated brother at his college. The baby had been born very sick due to Katie's lifetime practice of drinking unpasteurized milk. It is assumed by the jury and the townspeople that the baby died naturally of its weakened condition shortly after birth, and Katie is declared innocent of all wrongdoing. At the very end of the story, Katie's mother Sarah privately reveals to Ellie that she had known that Katie was pregnant and that she followed her the night that Katie gave birth. Sarah shows Ellie the scissors that had been missing from her husband's barn since that night. The implication is that she used the scissors to cut the umbilical cord, suffocated the baby, and disposed of the body in the pond. Though shocked and horrified at the gaunt older woman's admission, Ellie chooses not to reveal her knowledge to the police. The classic Picoult twist is that after all Ellie had been through trying to get the truth out of Katie, it seems as though Katie had been covering for her mother's murder all along.

== Cast ==
- Mariska Hargitay as Ellie Harrison
- Alison Pill as Katie Fitch
- Jan Niklas as Aaron Fitch
- Kate Trotter as Sarah Fitch
- Alec McClure as Jacob Fitch
- Robert Bockstael as George Calloway
- Colin Fox as Bishop Stoflus
- Jonathan LaPaglia as Cooper
- Laura Leigh Hughes as Det. Lisa Munro
- Catherine Disher as Leda
- Andrew Martin-Smith as Samuel Stoflus
- Christopher Ralph as Adam Sinclair
- Jeremy Akerman as Judge
- Mauralea Austin as Jury foreman
- Nigel Bennett as Jeremy Whitmore
