= Picture Perfect (novel) =

1995 novel by Jodi Picoult

- First edition
- Author: Jodi Picoult
- Language: English
- Genre: Family saga novel
- Publisher: Putnam
- Publication date: April 1995
- Publication place: United States
- Media type: Print
- Pages: 369 pp
- ISBN: 0-399-14040-9
- OCLC: 156344828

Picture Perfect (1995) is the third novel by the American author Jodi Picoult. The book is about a female anthropologist, Cassie Barrett, and the history of the abuse she receives from her celebrity husband, Alex Rivers.

== Plot ==
Cassie Barrett is a renowned anthropologist. Cassie wakes up on top of a grave, suffering from amnesia, unable to recall any details about herself or her situation. She is found and taken to the hospital by Will Flying Horse, a half-Lakota Los Angeles police officer, until she is retrieved by her husband, Alex Rivers, a Hollywood celebrity. Cassie returns to her Bel Air mansion, and it appears that she lives a picture perfect life. As memories gradually return to Cassie she recalls the whirlwind romance with Alex in Tanzania, her deep and unconditional love for Alex, and the physical abuse he has inflicted upon her.

When Cassie finds a positive pregnancy test in her bathroom, she recalls why she left—to protect her baby. Cassie returns to Will who hides her on the Lakota reservation in South Dakota. Cassie quickly grows to love the Reservation and its people. Meanwhile, Alex's life is beginning to fall apart, although he has won three Oscars; he cannot live and is lost without Cassie. Rumours abound concerning Cassie's disappearance that tarnish his reputation.

On the night of the Oscars, Cassie calls Alex to say that she is proud of him. After giving birth to Connor, her son, Cassie calls Alex again and tells him where she is, but says that she will not return home for another month. She makes him promise he will not come after her, but he breaks this promise, and shows up outside the Flying Horses' house two weeks later. They reunite and Cassie tells Alex of their son, Connor. She tells Alex she only left to protect their baby, and that she would never have left otherwise because of Alex. Cassie makes Alex agree that she will return on two conditions: that he see a therapist and not assault her. He agrees and when they are back in Los Angeles his reputation is restored, but only temporarily.

Alex stops going to therapy, and speculation about where Cassie was and the paternity of Connor circulates. Alex becomes aware of the rumours and assaults Cassie. Regret comes later that evening when Alex begs Cassie not to again leave. He again promises that he would do anything and says he cannot be without her. Cassie agrees, but she realizes that she cannot stay with Alex despite her love for him. She realizes that something has to make him hate her, so that they can both be free.

Cassie holds a press conference, announcing she is divorcing Alex on the grounds of extreme cruelty. She knows this will ruin Alex's career, and kill her as she is forcing Alex to stop loving her but she cannot stop loving him. She sees him in the crowd of reporters and when a reporter asks if she could say anything to Alex right at this moment, what it would be, she says, "I'd say what he always said to me. I never meant to hurt you."

== Main characters ==
Cassie Barrett - Protagonist, renowned anthropologist, Alex's wife, and Connor's mother.

Alex Rivers - Cassie's husband, actor, Connor's father.

Connor - Cassie and Alex's child.

Will Flying Horse - Los Angeles police officer, and half-Lakota man, who finds Cassie on the morning that she awakes in a cemetery.

== Reception ==
A reviewer for Publishers Weekly was critical of the author's choice at attempting to salvage a "predictable plot" by throwing in "a dollop of Native American culture and a noble savage who skirts the periphery of Cassie's tumultuous existence."

== See also ==
- Spousal abuse
- Domestic violence
