= The Book of Two Ways (novel) =

2020 novel by Jodi Picoult

- First edition (US)
- Author: Jodi Picoult
- Language: English
- Genre: Fiction
- Publisher: Ballantine Books (US); Hodder & Stoughton (UK)
- Publication date: September 22, 2020
- Publication place: USA, Egypt
- Pages: 432
- ISBN: 978-1-984818-35-5
- Preceded by: A Spark of Light

The Book of Two Ways is a 2020 novel by American writer Jodi Picoult.
