= The Pact (novel) =

1998 novel by Jodi Picoult

- First edition
- Author: Jodi Picoult
- Cover artist: Nada Bankovic & Tabitha King
- Language: English
- Genre: Novel
- Publisher: Allen & Unwin
- Publication date: 1998
- Publication place: United States
- Media type: Print (Paperback)
- Pages: 451 pp
- ISBN: 978-1-74114-036-1

The Pact (1998) is the fifth novel by the American author Jodi Picoult about a possible suicide pact between two teenage lovers, and the journey that one must take after losing a loved one.

== Structure ==
The Pact does not have traditional numbered chapters. The novel alternates between a series of present-day occurrences, labelled as "Now", and past events, labelled as "Then", which provides context to the relationships of the characters and the story line. Each segment of the novel contains a different character's perspective, while being narrated in the third person. The interplay between past and present throughout the story leads to a climactic revelation that provides an answer to the "whodunnit" mystery.

== Plot ==
In the fall of 1979, the Golds, consisting of a recently pregnant Melanie Gold and her husband Michael Gold, moved into the small town of Bainbridge, New Hampshire. They moved in next door to the Hartes, another coincidentally pregnant couple, and through their shared interests, the women, Gus Harte and Melanie Gold, began to forge a lasting friendship. Their husbands, James Harte and Michael Gold would follow suit and the families would soon raise their firstborns together.

From the moment they were delivered from the womb it seemed that Emily Gold and Chris Harte were destined to be together, and their parents certainly hoped that to be the case. By the time Chris and Emily were teenagers it was easy for them to develop feelings for each other and before they knew it they were dating. Everything seemed perfect, until a 3 a.m. telephone call to both family homes sent them running to the hospital. Chris and Emily had been found at the carousel where Chris worked, he was unconscious with an open head wound, and she had a gun shot to the head from a gun Chris's father owned. Emily was later pronounced dead in the emergency room

When a detective comes looking for Chris to answer questions about Emily's death, he learns that he is the main suspect in her death, which is being investigated as a homicide. However, Chris claims that he and Emily made a suicide pact, and he had fallen unconscious before he had the chance to end his own life as well. When a grieving Melanie caught wind of this, she is relieved to have the finger turned away from herself after struggling to believe she had not seen Emily's suicidal tendencies. Melanie focused all her anger at her daughter's premature death on making sure that her murderer (i.e. Chris) paid for his crime. Meanwhile, her husband, Michael, did not believe that Chris could have done such a thing after seeing the way he treated her with such care while they were friends and subsequently in a relationship together. Michael considers the possibility that his daughter may have kept more from him than he had thought. With mounting evidence against him, and an autopsy report that revealed that Emily had been several weeks pregnant at the time of her death, the state of New Hampshire had enough evidence to arrest Chris. He was soon after charged with first-degree murder. During this time, Chris met his lawyer, Jordan McAfee, who would deny him of revealing the truth about the night of Emily's death because to McAfee the only truth that mattered was the one that was most likely to help his client. Due to the severity of the charge, Chris is remanded to jail without bail until the trial, which would be several months away.

When Melanie Gold comes across a hidden diary belonging to Emily that contains proof that Chris had not known about the baby because she had not told him, she destroys the book in a fire. Meanwhile, Michael Gold agrees to take the stand as a witness for the defense after his convictions would not allow him to believe that Chris was guilty. During the trial, it is revealed that Emily had been molested as a young girl and kept it to herself for the remainder of her life. Emily also feared that her pregnancy at such a young age would ruin her reputation and her ability to meet the expectations that she had set for herself in her youth. It is further revealed that Emily loved Chris like a brother not as a boyfriend and future husband. She felt her pregnancy would trap her into a potential marriage and forever tie her to Chris which she did not want. Emily secretly attempted to get an abortion, but she backed out at the last minute when a male doctor inadvertently gave her a flashback to her assault as a child. Feeling like she has no way out from her situation and from the self-deprecating thoughts in her head she begins to contemplate suicide as her only option.

Chris's trial begins and it appears as though McAfee could give his client a fighting chance with the jury. It is up to Chris's last witness, Gus Harte, his mother, to speak for her son's behalf, but she cannot find it in herself to remain composed after her visit with Chris the previous night, when he angrily told her that he had in fact shot Emily. In a last minute decision Chris requests his mother's removal as a defense witness, and instead wishes to testify on his own behalf. Much to his lawyer's dismay Chris takes the stand and tells the truth about what happened the night of Emily's death. He begins telling the story a few weeks before that fateful night when Emily first told him she wanted to die by suicide, and he had dismissed her statement, but then she brought it up again and he could not ignore it any longer. Chris explains that at first he wanted to tell someone, but quickly realized he would be betraying Emily's trust, and that the burden of saving her fell onto him alone. In order to maintain Emily's trust, he plays along with her plan and brings his father's gun loaded upon her request to the carousel that held so much sentimental value for them. After basking in each other's presence for some time, Emily lifted the gun to her head and found that she was too scared to do it on her own so she begged Chris to do it for her. In that moment he felt the pain that she was trying so hard to escape from and knew that he would do anything for her. Chris held the gun to Emily's head and could not find the strength to shoot her. He felt the pressure of Emily's hand over his own on the trigger and then a shot was fired. From Chris's account it was clear he was not sure if he truly had pulled the trigger or if Emily's hand had pushed his fingers onto it. Jordan McAfee continues to question Chris after his confession, and pressed him to remember exactly who had pulled the trigger, until Chris finally admitted that he could not definitively say who had ultimately fired the gun.

The jury had reached a verdict, and neither McAfee nor anyone else supporting Chris thought there was much hope of the decision being in his favor after his confession on the stand. However, in a surprising turn of events the jury found Chris not guilty. Since the end of the trial, life went on for both the Hartes and the Golds, but neither were the same after what had happened, nor were their friendships.

== Main characters ==
Christopher Harte: Protagonist; an 18-year-old boy who is in love with his childhood best friend, Emily Gold. He is very caring and compassionate as can be seen through his interactions with Emily, he is honest and noble, and he is a proficient swimmer. When he finds himself on trial for the murder of his girlfriend, amidst half-truths, lies, and foggy memories, he must decipher what truly happened that night and hope his love for Emily is as real to the jury as it is for him.

Emily Gold: Chris Harte's best friend and love interest. She is a troubled 17-year-old girl who is very artistically talented. She struggles to maintain her positive image as she fights an internal losing battle. When she is found dead with a bullet wound from a gun that Chris's father owned and Chris is the last person she was with prior to her death, the only question remains, was it suicide or was it murder?

Michael Gold: The kind and nurturing father of Emily Gold. He is a veterinarian who values every life and he has a very passive, non-confrontational attitude. He does not believe that Chris killed his daughter and tries to be open to other possibilities rather than immediately pointing a finger.

Melanie Gold:The reserved and loving mother of Emily Gold. She works as a librarian and is a bibliophile. She is best friends with Gus Harte, whose firecracker personality complements her more mellow personality well. When her daughter dies she becomes resentful and angry. Her loyalties begin to shift when Chris Harte is found at the crime scene, alive.

James Harte: The father of Chris Harte and a practicing ophthalmologist. He is a very composed man who values his reputation very highly and avoids anything that will taint it. The scandal of Emily Gold's death and his son's murder charge leads him to try and attain any semblance of normalcy to avoid addressing the issues facing him, and in this process he drives away his wife and son.

Gus Harte: The mother of Chris Harte and wife of James Harte. She has a bright and bubbly personality. She is a dedicated mother that puts her children first. She is also best friends with Melanie Gold. She is at a crossroads when she is left to defend her son's character in court, while trying to mend a relationship with Melanie who has already convicted Chris before the jury has even reached a verdict.

Jordan McAfee: The defense attorney of Chris Harte. When circumstance and evidence appear to be against his client, he musters up his creativity, wit and legal expertise to save Chris from imprisonment.

== Themes ==
Friendship: The Pact emphasizes the lines that blur between that of close friendships and family, and how they can be tested when there is an unexpected death and evidence points to a member of the group.

Love: The book discusses the power of love and how it goes beyond the grave. It also considers the idea of loving someone so much that one would be willing to do anything for them even if it means ending their life, and endangering one's own freedom.

Family: The Pact delves into family bonds, and explores the question of how well parents can know their own children.

Loss: The novel considers the pain of loss and demonstrates the varying ways individuals express and feel grief. For instance, Melanie Gold distances herself from others and becomes resentful from grief, Gus Harte keeps herself busy, being anywhere she is needed, and James Harte tries to ignore the situation entirely.

== Recognition ==
The Pact was on the New York Times Bestseller list.

== Film adaptation ==
On November 4, 2002 Lifetime Television debuted a film adaptation of the novel, The Pact. Directed by Peter Werner it starred Henry Czerny, Megan Mullally, Jessica Steen, Juliet Stevenson, Bob Gunton, Eric Lively, and J.C. Mackenzie

=== Cast ===
- Megan Mullally as Melanie Gold, Emily's mother
- Juliet Stevenson as Gus Harte, Chris's mother
- Henry Czerny as Michael Gold, Emily's father
- Bob Gunton as James Harte, Chris's father
- Eric Lively as Chris Harte, Emily's love interest
- J.C. MacKenzie as Jordan McAfee, Chris's attorney
- Jessica Steen as Detective Anne-Marie Marrone

== Differences Film Adaptation and Novel ==
In the film, Chris Harte attends Emily Gold's funeral. However, in the novel Chris is undergoing a mental evaluation, after he was found at the carousel and neither the hospital nor his mother think it would be a good idea for him to attend the funeral.

In the movie Melanie Gold and Gus Harte interact considerably more and are more central characters, while in the novel Melanie distances herself from Gus.

In the film Chris is able to afford bond and is let out of jail on his own recognizance after being charged with first-degree murder. However, in the novel, Chris is specifically held in jail without the possibility of bond because of the severity of the case. Chris experiences a lot of personal growth during his time in jail while awaiting his trial.

In the film Chris's father, James, testifies on his son's behalf in court, but in the novel James refuses to testify, as he tries to distance himself from the entire situation.
