= Off the Page (novel) =

2015 young adult novel

- Author: Jodi Picoult; Samantha van Leer
- Language: English
- Genre: Young adult fiction, Fantasy
- Publisher: Ember Publishing; Delacorte Press
- Publication date: May 19, 2015
- Publication place: USA
- Pages: 356pp (ebook)
- ISBN: 9780553535587 (first edition)
- OCLC: 896687718
- Preceded by: Between The Lines

Off the Page is a young adult fiction novel co-written by American author Jodi Picoult and her daughter, Samantha Van Leer. Off the Page is Picoult's second YA novel, and also Van Leer's second published work. The novel was published on May 19, 2015, by Ember Publishing, an imprint of Random House Publishing Group and Delacorte Press. It is the second novel in the Between The Lines duology, following Between the Lines.

== Plot summary ==
Delilah, a 15-year-old teenager, bookworm and social outcast, is obsessed with a fairy tale story about Prince Oliver called Between the Lines. No one is able to understand Delilah's obsession with a book written for children. Delilah's parents are divorced, and her best friend is a punk-rocker named Jules, who is an outcast of her own choosing. Oliver and Delilah falls in and soon, Delilah discovers she can bring him out of the book.
