= Off the Page (radio series) =

British discussion programme

- Running time: 30 mins
- Country of origin: United Kingdom
- Language: English
- Home station: BBC Radio 4
- Hosted by: Matthew Parris; Dominic Arkwright
- Website: Website

Off The Page is a British discussion programme, broadcast on BBC Radio 4 on Fridays at 11 pm. It is produced in Bristol.

The programme features a panel of contributors who tackle a subject on which they are experts. Each panelist writes an introductory column with their take on the week's topic which acts as a springboard for further discussion.

Until 2006 the series was presented by Matthew Parris, who has moved on to Radio 4's biography series Great Lives. He was succeeded by Dominic Arkwright, a radio reporter for the Today programme who has covered conflicts in Afghanistan, Mozambique, Nagorno-Karabakh, Kashmir and Kosovo among others.

The programme is intended to attract listeners who like thoughtful and observant writing and free-flowing uninhibited conversation.
