= Songs of the Humpback Whale (novel) =

1992 novel by Jodi Picoult

- First edition
- Author: Jodi Picoult
- Language: English
- Genre: Family saga novel
- Publisher: Faber & Faber
- Publication date: 1992
- Publication place: United States
- Media type: Print (Paperback)
- Pages: 352 pp
- ISBN: 0-7434-3101-4
- OCLC: 53973621

Songs of the Humpback Whale (1992) is the debut novel of Jodi Picoult. The book is about Jane, a woman who chooses to leave her emotionally abusive and distant husband behind in favor of driving across the country from San Diego, California to live with her brother in Massachusetts on an apple orchard. Her teenage daughter, Rebecca, chooses to come with her. Oliver, her husband, tracks them down in an attempt to save his family.

== Plot summary ==
Jane Jones, a speech pathologist, has been married to Oliver Jones for almost twenty years. Together, they have a teenage daughter named Rebecca. Oliver is a world-renowned marine biologist. However, Oliver has a history of behaving emotionally abusive and emotionally unavailable. After a heated argument that culminated in Jane slapping Oliver, Jane calls her brother Joley, who is living and working on an apple orchard in Massachusetts. Through a series of letters awaiting the mother-daughter duo at designated post offices, Joley guides Jane and Rebecca across the country until they are reunited, while Oliver begins to obsessively track them down.

The orchard is owned by Sam, who employs and lodges his friend, Hadley, as well as Jane's brother, Joley. Soon into her stay at the orchard, Jane and Sam begin an affair, and a relationship develops between Rebecca and Hadley. This is controversial, as Hadley is 25 and Rebecca is 15, while Jane is 35 and Sam is 25. Jane is worried about her daughter, and is able to persuade Sam to chase Hadley away. Sam agrees to do so reluctantly.

Eventually, Oliver is able to track Jane and Rebecca to the apple orchard. Oliver arrives with the intention of bringing the women back to San Diego. However, Rebecca, afraid of being separated from Hadley, runs away to his mother's house, where he resides. The pair are discovered one morning atop a mountain by Oliver, along with Sam, and a park ranger. Hadley, startled and attempting to run falls from the mountain to his death. Sick with pneumonia from spending the night outside, Rebecca has no choice but to return to the orchard.

Confronted with the consequences of leaving her husband and travelling across the country, Jane returns home to San Diego with Oliver and Rebecca.

== Narrative style ==
Songs of the Humpback Whale is told in five voices. It uses the alternating narrator style that Picoult often employs, including in My Sister's Keeper, in which the characters take turns narrating chapters and providing their perspective on the same event. However, Rebecca's chapters are told in reverse order of the events from her and Jane deciding to return home to California from Massachusetts. In the paperback version of the book, each characters' narrative is told in a different font style.

== Characters ==
Jane Jones: Mother of Rebecca, wife of Oliver, speech pathologist, age 35.

Oliver Jones: Jane's husband, Rebecca's father, marine biologist studying the songs of male humpback whales.

Rebecca Jones: Teenage daughter of Jane and Oliver, age 15.

Joley: Jane's brother, Rebecca's uncle, employee at Sam's apple orchard in Massachusetts.

Sam: Owner of the apple orchard in Massachusetts, Jane's lover, age 25.

Hadley: Sam's friend and an employee at his apple orchard, in a relationship with Rebecca, age 25.

== Critical reception ==
According to a 2011 review in The Guardian, "The story is difficult to follow, as it keeps switching from one character to another, flashing back and going forward to events that never end up happening. Each character has a story to tell, but it all links together very poorly. Clearly, Jodi Picoult has put in an immense effort, but because this is her first novel, it is very easy to see that she was not yet the writer she is today."

== See also ==
- Spousal abuse
- Domestic violence
- Marine biology
- Whale vocalization
