= Change of Heart (novel) =

2008 novel by Jodi Picoult

- Hardcover USA edition
- Author: Jodi Picoult
- Language: English
- Publisher: Atria Books
- Publication date: March 4, 2008
- Publication place: United States
- Media type: Print (hardcover)
- Pages: 461
- ISBN: 978-0-340-93583-5
- OCLC: 166373133
- Dewey Decimal: 813/.54 22
- LC Class: PS3566.I372 C47 2008

Change of Heart is the sixteenth novel by American author Jodi Picoult, published in 2008. The novel explores themes of loss, redemption, religion and spirituality, and punishment.

== Plot summary ==
=== Prologue ===
A man, Jack, is killed by an impaired driver, leaving his wife, June, and his daughter, Elizabeth behind. At the scene of the accident, June meets Kurt Nealon, a police officer, who becomes a close friend and later June's husband. A number of years later, June is pregnant and Kurt plans to create an addition onto their home. A young man named Shay Bourne offers to help with the addition, to which June explains is "the beginning of the end."

=== The Trial ===
Elizabeth, June's eldest daughter, and Kurt are found murdered. Shay, the construction worker, is identified as the only suspect. The case unfolds during the trial which becomes a media sensation. The jury convicts Shay of two counts of capital murder. The jury deliberates on the death penalty, and after much time, 11 members agree, with Michael Wright, a young man about Shay's age, being the last juror to agree on the death penalty conviction, after being coerced by the other jury members.

=== Eleven Years Later ===
Shay Bourne is transferred to the I-tier at the Concord state prison. Shay resides in a cell next to Lucius DuFresne, an artist. During the night, Shay confides in Lucius that he wants to donate his heart to a little girl he saw on TV in need of a heart transplant. The little girl on television that Shay spoke about is revealed to be the daughter of June and the late Kurt, Claire, who has a terminal heart condition.

June agrees to meet Shay in for a restorative justice meeting. There she asks him, "Why did you do it?" to which Shay answers cryptically, "She was better off dead." Out of spite, June agrees to take Shay's donated heart once he is executed. Maggie, an attorney, begins the legal process to petition the commissioner of corrections to allow Shay to be hanged rather than executed by lethal injection, so he will be able to donate his heart to Claire. Claire's doctor is able to determine that Shay is a perfect heart transplant match.

Maggie, Shay's lawyer, arranges a dinner meeting with Dr. Christian Gallagher, a doctor she's consulting to discuss organ donation for Shay. June sneaks Dudley, the family's spaniel, into the hospital to make Claire feel better, and a nurse reveals the upcoming transplant to Claire, which June hadn't discussed with her daughter yet.

Shay's trial begins, and Father Michael testifies to Shay's religious belief that he needs to donate his heart to Claire to be redeemed. Father Michael uses Shay's quotations from the Gnostic Gospels as his religious foundation. Ian Fletcher testifies as an expert on the Gnostic Gospels. Father Michael, privately, admits to Shay that he was on the jury that convicted him to death. Father Michael is able to locate Shay's sister, Grace, and tries to convince her to forgive Shay for setting the fire that ultimately disfigured her face. However, Grace actually started the fire in an attempt to kill their abusive father. Shay took the blame to protect his sister. While Shay testifies, all of his chains (including the belly chain and handcuffs) fall away from him for no apparent reason.

During Shay's trial, it is revealed that Kurt was sexually abusing his step-daughter, Elizabeth. At the time of the murders, Shay walked in on Kurt assaulting Elizabeth. Shay killed Kurt, who accidentally shot Elizabeth instead of Shay.

The trial concludes, and Shay is granted his request to be executed by hanging to be able to donate his heart to Claire.

=== Epilogue ===
Three weeks after Claire's surgery, she is able to go home. While resting at home, Grace, Shay's sister, visits her. Claire sees that her dog Dudley has died, but when she picks him up and holds him to her chest, his heart begins to beat again.

== Characters ==
- June Nealon - Mother of Claire and Elizabeth, wife of Jack, and then Kurt.
- Elizabeth Nealon - June's daughter by Jack. She was one of Shay Bourne's victims. She was sexually abused by Kurt, her step-father, before she died.
- Kurt Nealon - The policeman at Jack's car accident, then June's husband. He was one of Shay Bourne's victims.
- Claire Nealon - Kurt and June's daughter, who needs a new heart.
- Shay Bourne - The accused murderer of Kurt and Elizabeth. He has been on death row for eleven years. He wishes to donate his heart after his execution to Claire.
- Michael Wright - University of New Hampshire college student, member of Shay's first jury trial, priest, and eventually Shay's spiritual advisor.
- Lucius DuFresne - A prisoner in the state prison in Concord. He has HIV, is an artist, and resides in the cell adjacent to Shay. Lucius is in prison because he killed his lover, Adam in a fit of jealous rage when he was found with another man.
- Alma - A prison nurse.
- Calloway - A white-supremacist prisoner residing on the I-tier with Shay.
- Maggie Bloom - An ACLU lawyer who takes on Shay's case.
- Oliver - Maggie's pet rabbit.
- Dudley - June and Claire's 13-year-old springer spaniel. He is the last connection between Elizabeth and Claire.
- Dr. Wu - Claire's cardiac physician. He encourages June to take Shay's heart.
- Rabbi Joel Bloom - Maggie's father.
- Judge Haig - The judge that presides over Shay's trial to control his method of execution.
- Dr. Christian Gallagher - The doctor who provides Maggie with information on organ donation. He eventually begins a romantic relationship with Maggie. He is also the physician of record for Shay's execution.
- Grace Bourne - Shay's sister, who was disfigured in the fire that sent Shay to juvenile detention. She was sexually abused by a foster father when she was thirteen. Ultimately, Grace was the one to tell June that Kurt was sexually abusing her daughter, Elizabeth.
- Ian Fletcher - A recurring character, joined with his step-daughter, Faith, from Picoult's novel, Keeping Faith.

== Style ==
Change of Heart is written such that each chapter is from the point of view of one of the characters, either Maggie, Michael, Lucius, or June. According to Picoult, the narrators were set up like the Four Gospels of Matthew, Mark, Luke, and John. Accordingly, the Bible's Gospel of Matthew, Mark, Luke, and John correspond to the narrators names.

== Literary significance and reception ==
In their review, Publishers Weekly said, "Picoult bangs out another ripped-from-the-zeitgeist winner. Picoult moves the story along with lively debates about prisoner rights and religion, while plumbing the depths of mother-daughter relationships and examining the literal and metaphorical meanings of having heart." The publication also said, "The point-of-view switches are abrupt, but this is a small flaw in an impressive book". However, others say that the different viewpoints of the characters provide valuable insight to the story for the reader and abruptness is inevitable.

Donna Seaman reviewing in Booklist writes, it is "a compulsively readable saga and dramatic critique of capital punishment". Seaman compares Change of Heart to The Da Vinci Code by Dan Brown, describing the novel as, "Laced with intriguing musings on the Gnostic Gospels, Picoult's bold story of loss, justice, redemption, and faith reminds us how tragically truth can be concealed and denied."

Janet Maslin writing for The New York Times had several criticisms of the book. Maslin wrote that Picoult wrote the novel on "authorial autopilot", as it has the "subtlety of a jackhammer" and was made needlessly long by scenes such as Maggie chatting with her pet rabbit. Maslin asserts that June Nealon is "a wet hankie of a character, full of grief and anger, but otherwise lacking any distinguishing characteristics." She felt that Picoult missed her own chance at redemption, "had Change of Heart culminated in revelations that were truly plausible or unexpected, its vapidity might have been transcended. But there is no substance to the story's last surprises."

In terms of public reception, Change of Heart debuted as number one on The New York Times Fiction bestseller list. It remained at the number one position for two additional weeks, before being knocked from the number one position on April 13, 2008 by Jonathan Kellerman's Compulsion.

== Film adaption ==
On December 13, 2011 Paramount Pictures announced their plan to produce a film based on the novel. On December 26, 2011 it was confirmed that Paramount Pictures had obtained the film rights to the novel and MTV Films was lined up to co-produce. Peter Jackson, the director of Alice Sebold's novel The Lovely Bones, is slated to direct the film adaption with Fran Walsh writing the screenplay. In an interview on January 8, 2012 the senior president of MTV Films stated that they are no longer involved with the project.

On January 13, 2012 Paramount Pictures announced that the first actor to be cast was Sean Bean who will play the role of Shay Bourne. Selena Gomez was the first choice for the role of Claire Nealon but she turned down the project. Instead, Dakota Fanning was cast as Claire. On January 19, 2012 Rachel Weisz and Scott Porter signed onto the project to play as June and Kurt Nealon. On January 20, 2012 Screen Gems Production asked to co-produce the film in place of MTV Films.

On January 26, 2012 author, singer-actress Hilary Duff expressed her interest in the film.

== Publication history ==
- 2008, USA, Atria Books ISBN 978-0-7434-9674-2, ISBN 0-7434-9674-4, Pub Date 4 March 2008, Hardcover
- 2008, USA, Recorded Books ISBN 978-1-4281-9817-3, Audio CD
- 2008, UK, Hodder & Stoughton ISBN 978-0-340-93581-1, Pub Date 17 April 2008, Hardcover
- 2008, Australia, Allen & Unwin ISBN 978-1-74175-496-4, Hardcover
- 2008, Australia, Allen & Unwin ISBN 978-1-74175-073-7, Paperback

== See also ==
- Gnostic gospels
- The miracles of Jesus
