= My Sister's Keeper (novel) =

2004 novel by Jodi Picoult

- First edition
- Author: Jodi Picoult
- Language: English
- Publisher: Atria
- Publication date: April 6, 2004
- Publication place: United States
- Media type: Print (Hardcover & Paperback)
- Pages: 432 pp
- ISBN: 0-7434-5452-9
- OCLC: 54811160
- Dewey Decimal: 813/.54 22
- LC Class: PS3566.I372 M9 2003

My Sister's Keeper is the eleventh novel by the American author Jodi Picoult. It is based upon Anissa and Marissa Ayala. Published in 2004, it tells the story of thirteen-year-old Anna Fitzgerald, who sues her parents for medical emancipation when she is told to donate a kidney to her elder sister Kate, who is suffering from acute leukemia.

== Summary ==
The story takes place in the fictional town of Upper Darby, Rhode Island in 2004. Anna Fitzgerald's older sister, Kate, suffers from acute promyelocytic leukemia, a blood and bone marrow cancer. Anna was born as a savior sister specifically so she could save Kate's life through the donation of her umbilical cord blood. At first it is successful, but the cancer continues to reoccur throughout Kate's life.

Anna is usually willing to donate whatever Kate needs, but when she turns 13, she is told that she will have to donate one of her kidneys due to Kate's kidney failure. The surgery required for both Kate and Anna would be major; it is not guaranteed to work, as the stress of the operation may kill Kate anyway, and the loss of a kidney could have a serious impact on Anna's life. Anna petitions for medical emancipation with the help of lawyer Campbell Alexander, so she will be able to make her own decisions regarding her medical treatment and the donation of her kidney.

At first Sara, their mother, believes that Anna's decision is led by a simple need of attention, but Anna is serious and refuses to withdraw her complaint, so the case has to be discussed in front of a judge. Having been a civil attorney before becoming a mother, Sara decides to represent herself. The judge assigned to the case is Judge De Salvo, who the year before lost his 12-year-old daughter because of a drunk driver.

Recognizing that it is impossible for Anna and Sara to be together during the trial, Judge De Salvo hires Julia Romano, the court-appointed guardian ad litem whose job it is to decide what would be best for Anna. Julia was once romantically involved with Campbell when they went to high school together, but Campbell broke her heart when he left her. Unbeknownst to Julia, Campbell left her because, after an accident that resulted in a concussion, he developed epilepsy and thought she deserved better.

Meanwhile, Anna's older brother, Jesse, who has spent most of his life being ignored in favor of ill Kate or donor Anna, spends most of his time setting fire to abandoned buildings with homemade explosives and using illegal drugs. He is a self-confessed juvenile delinquent, which leads to their father Brian eventually confronting Jesse for his behavior.

During the trial, it is revealed that Anna is acting under her sister's wishes: Kate is tired of living; she's prepared to die and doesn't want to force Anna to donate a kidney that will likely not be adequate to save her life, so she encouraged Anna to gain the independence that has always been denied to her. As Anna stands up to testify, Campbell has an epileptic seizure and, thanks to this, Julia discovers the reason of their breakup, leading her to swear to Campbell that he doesn't need to hide his illness from her, and that they can be together. The judge rules in Anna's favor, and grants Campbell a medical power of attorney. After gaining medical emancipation, Anna hints that she plans to donate her kidney to Kate, wanting her sister to live. However, as Campbell drives her home after the trial, their car is T-boned by a truck. The on-call firefighter, who happens to be Brian, arrives at the scene, retrieving an unconscious and severely injured Anna from the wreckage of the crushed car.

At the hospital, the doctor informs Sara and Brian that Anna is brain-dead and says that they will need to act quickly if they wish to donate her organs. An injured Campbell approves the procedure and Kate's life is saved. Sara and Brian are devastated and struggle to cope for the next eight years after Anna's life support machines are shut off. During this time, Jesse becomes a police officer and Kate becomes a ballet teacher. Kate ends the story by reflecting on the tragedy and explaining that she feels deep guilt but also a bond with the part of Anna inside of her.

== Characters ==
- Katherine "Kate" Fitzgerald – A frail teenage girl who was diagnosed with promyelocytic leukemia at a young age. She is the older sister of Anna, and the middle child out of all three Fitzgerald siblings. She sometimes finds all the attention on her stifling. One of the few times that Kate experiences being a typical teenaged girl is when she dates, and has her first kiss with a boy named Taylor. Kate supports the feelings of her younger sister, Anna, and is thankful for the bodily donations Anna has been made to give her throughout her lifetime. At the end of the novel, Kate is revealed to be the one who asked Anna to sue for medical emancipation, because, fed up with the awareness of how much she took from her and the rest of their family, she wanted, for once, to be the sister who protected the other one.
- Andromeda "Anna" Fitzgerald – A girl who was biologically engineered in order to be a "savior sibling" to her elder sister, Kate. At first Anna was only meant to donate her umbilical cord, but in response to Kate's relapses, Anna repeatedly donates blood, marrow, and eventually, an organ to her. She is 13 years old at the time the novel takes place, and seeks to be medically emancipated from her parents. She believes that this legal support is necessary to help her resist the growing pressure on her to donate a kidney. She is the main protagonist of the novel.
- Jesse Fitzgerald – The oldest Fitzgerald child. Throughout most of the novel, he is a delinquent teenager, but eventually reforms after a confrontation with his father.
- Sara Fitzgerald – The controlling mother of Kate, Anna, and Jesse. She tries her hardest to keep her oldest, ill, daughter alive and well. Sara refuses to accept the idea that Kate is likely to die, and in doing so she neglects the needs of her two other children, whom she keeps seeing in relation to Kate. Before the novel's end, Sara finally listens to Anna about Kate and comes to terms with Kate's choice to die, expressing remorse for her behavior.
- Brian Fitzgerald – Sara's husband, who understands Anna's decision to not donate her kidney, but also feels compassion for his wife. He is fond of astronomy and becomes torn between his daughters, and his wife, during Anna's emancipation trial. Ultimately, Brian sides with his wife during his testimony in court, regardless of his conflicting feelings. He also shows concern for his son, and is the one to confront him about his troubling behavior. After Anna's death, he too needs a lot of time to cope with it.
- Julia Romano – The court-appointed, guardian ad litem, whose job it is to decide what is best for Anna. She also often advises Anna regarding medical emancipation. She and Anna's lawyer, Campbell Alexander, dated in young adulthood, before he left her without explaining why.
- Campbell Alexander – The lawyer who defends Anna as she tries to become medically emancipated from her parents. He believes that she should have control over her own body, and eventually obtains medical power of attorney over her, when the case is successful. He personally uses a service dog, which others find mysterious, because he does not tell anyone why. It is later uncovered that Campbell has epilepsy, and that this diagnosis is the reason he broke up with Julia, as he did not believe she "deserved" an unwell mate, that she'd have to look after.
- Suzanne – Jesse, Kate and Anna's wealthy aunt, Brian's sister-in-law and Sara's older sister of 10 years. Their relationship is strained due to her overzealousness in keeping Kate alive. Unlike Brian, Suzanne shows more support for Anna, even explaining how disappointed she is in Sara for how she treated both her daughters.
- Dr. Harrison Chance – Kate's oncologist.
- Judge DeSalvo – The presiding judge over Anna's medical emancipation case.
- Isobel "Izzy" Romano – Julia's twin sister and roommate. She is a jewelry designer and she is fresh from a relationship with another woman named Janet. She is very close to her sister and as such despises Campbell for having left Julia.
- Taylor Ambrose – Kate's boyfriend. He is diagnosed with myeloid leukemia and meets her at the hospital while undergoing chemotherapy. Kate has some of her happiest times with him, as he's one of the only people with whom she's been able to fully relate. After they go to a prom, Kate comes to believe that Taylor has ceased contact with her. She becomes estranged from her mother after learning the truth, which is that Sara learned about Taylor's death and concealed it from Kate, fearing that the grief would rob Kate of the will to live.

== Publication history ==
Picoult, Jodi. My Sister's Keeper. Atria Books: New York, 2004; ISBN 9781416549178/ISBN 141654917X.

== Critical reception ==
In review for The Washington Post, Katherine Arie described some of the characters as unconvincing, such as Brian, who is "too good to be true", Jesse, "a poster child for self-destructive behavior", and Kate, who is "as weak and wispy on the page as she's supposed to be in life", but ultimately called the book "a thrill to read".

In 2009, the American Library Association (ALA) and the office for Intellectual Freedom named My Sister's Keeper the seventh out of ten most frequently challenged books in the US. The book has been a frequent target of censorship challenges in schools and public libraries.

== Adaptations ==
New Line Cinema adapted My Sister's Keeper into a feature film, which was directed by Nick Cassavetes and released on June 26, 2009. It starred Cameron Diaz as Sara and Alec Baldwin as Campbell. Kate and Anna were played respectively by Sofia Vassilieva and Abigail Breslin.

The film features an alternate ending and more emphasis on certain subplots while entirely eliminating others, which went against the wishes of Picoult.
