= Sevendust discography =

Band discography

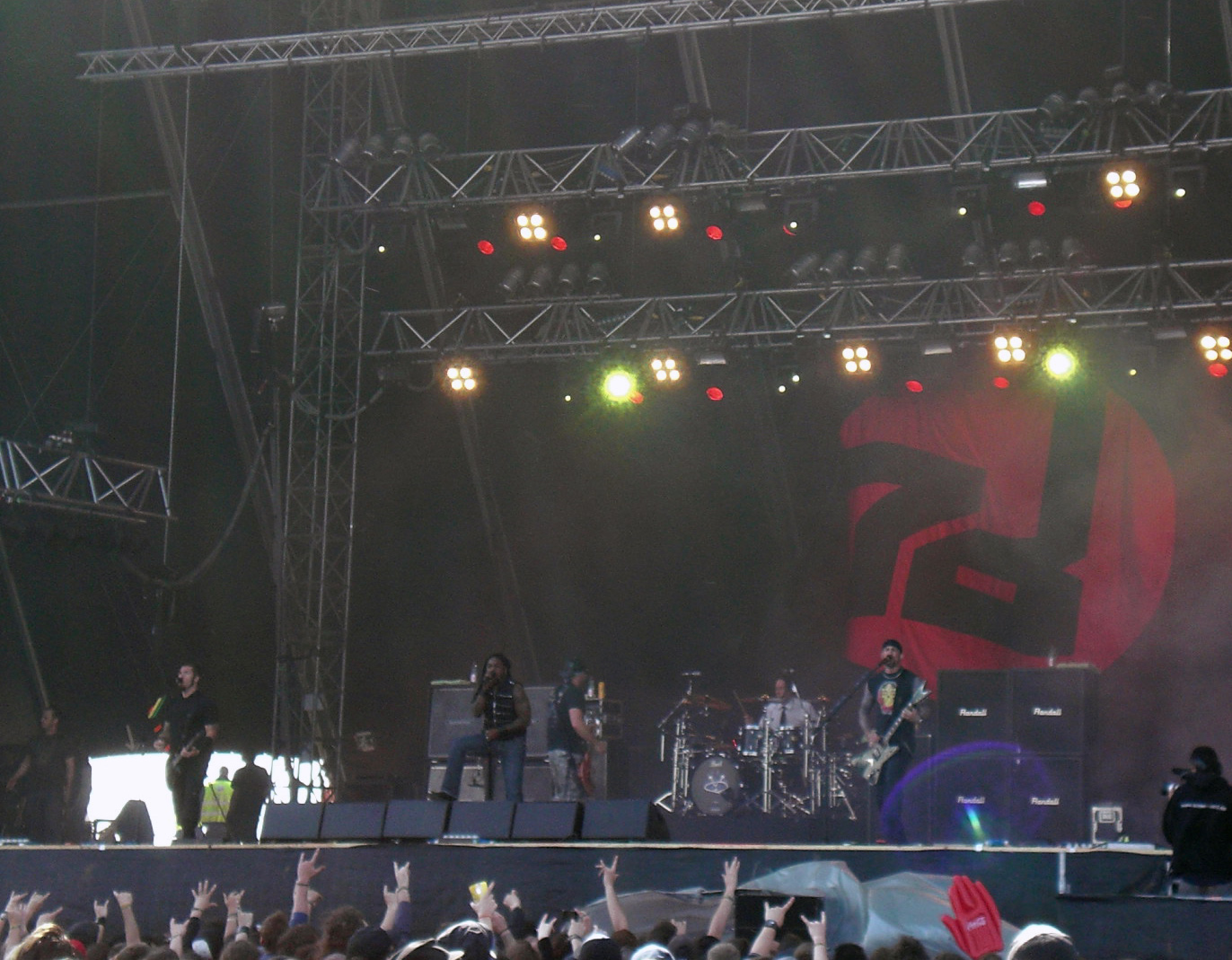
- Studio albums: 15
- Live albums: 1
- Compilation albums: 2
- Singles: 33
- Video albums: 5
- Music videos: 32
- Promotional singles: 22

The American rock band Sevendust has released 15 studio albums, one live album, two compilation albums, 33 singles, 22 promotional singles and 32 music videos.

== Albums ==
=== Studio albums ===
List of studio albums, with selected chart positions and certifications
Title	Details	Peak chart positions							Certifications
Title	Details	US	US Hard Rock	US Rock	AUS	NZ	SWI	UK Rock	Certifications
Sevendust	Released: April 15, 1997; Label: TVT; Formats: CD, cassette, digital download	165	—	—	—	—	—	—	RIAA: Gold
Home	Released: August 24, 1999; Label: TVT; Formats: CD, cassette, digital download	19	—	—	73	26	—	—	RIAA: Gold
Animosity	Released: November 13, 2001; Label: TVT; Formats: CD, cassette, digital download	28	—	—	34	26	—	—	RIAA: Gold
Seasons	Released: October 7, 2003; Label: TVT; Formats: CD, digital download	14	—	—	38	20	—	—	
Next	Released: October 11, 2005; Label: Winedark; Formats: CD, digital download, vinyl	20	—	—	60	—	—	31	
Alpha	Released: March 6, 2007; Label: Asylum, 7 Bros.; Formats: CD, digital download, vinyl	14	—	6	—	—	—	—	
Chapter VII: Hope & Sorrow	Released: April 1, 2008; Label: Asylum, 7 Bros.; Formats: CD, digital download, vinyl	19	12	9	—	—	—	—	
Cold Day Memory	Released: April 20, 2010; Label: Asylum, 7 Bros.; Formats: CD, digital download, vinyl	12	3	4	—	—	—	—	
Black Out the Sun	Released: March 26, 2013; Label: Asylum, 7 Bros.; Formats: CD, digital download, vinyl	18	1	5	—	—	—	29	
Time Travelers & Bonfires	Released: April 15, 2014; Label: Asylum, 7 Bros.; Formats: CD, digital download, vinyl	19	1	4	—	—	—	—	
Kill the Flaw	Released: October 2, 2015; Label: Asylum, 7 Bros.; Formats: CD, digital download, vinyl	13	2	2	44	—	—	39	
All I See Is War	Released: May 11, 2018; Label: Rise; Formats: CD, digital download, vinyl	28	2	5	92	—	59	12	
Blood & Stone	Released: October 23, 2020; Label: Rise; Formats: CD, digital download, vinyl	55	2	10	90	—	—	27	
Truth Killer	Released: July 28, 2023; Label: Napalm; Formats: CD, digital download, vinyl	80	3	11	—	—	58	23	
One	Released: May 1, 2026; Label: Napalm; Formats: CD, digital download, vinyl	—	20	—	92	—	—	16	
"—" denotes a recording that did not chart or was not released in that territory.

=== Live albums ===
List of live albums, with selected chart positions
Title	Details	Peak chart positions
Title	Details	US
Southside Double-Wide: Acoustic Live	Released: May 4, 2004; Label: TVT; Formats: CD, digital download	90

=== Compilation albums ===
List of compilation albums, with selected chart positions
Title	Details	Peak chart positions
Title	Details	US
Best Of (Chapter One 1997–2004)	Released: December 27, 2005; Label: TVT; Formats: CD, digital download	156
Retrospective 2	Released: December 11, 2007; Label: Asylum, 7 Bros.; Formats: CD, digital download	—
"—" denotes a recording that did not chart or was not released in that territory.

=== Video albums ===
List of video albums, with selected chart positions
Title	Details	Peak chart positions
Title	Details	US Video
Live and Loud	Released: September 16, 1998; Label: TVT; Formats: DVD	—
Retrospect	Released: September 11, 2001; Label: TVT; Formats: DVD	—
Southside Double-Wide: Acoustic Live	Released: May 4, 2004; Label: TVT; Formats: DVD	2
Retrospective 2	Released: December 11, 2007; Label: Asylum, 7 Bros.; Formats: DVD	40
Sevendust Acoustic Live in Denver	Released: December 14, 2016; Label: AXS TV; Formats: DVD	—
"—" denotes a recording that did not chart or was not released in that territory.

== Singles ==
List of singles, with selected chart positions, showing year released and album name
Title	Year	Peak chart positions							Album
Title	Year	US Alt.	US Heri. Rock	US Main. Rock	US Rock	US Rock Air.	AUS	UK Rock	Album
"Black"	1997	—	—	30	—	—	—	—	Sevendust
"Bitch"	1998	—	—	30	—	—	—	—	Sevendust
"Too Close to Hate"	1998	—	—	39	—	—	—	—	Sevendust
"Denial"	1999	26	—	14	—	—	—	—	Home
"Waffle"	1999	33	—	23	—	—	77	—	Home
"Praise"	2001	23	29	15	—	—	—	—	Animosity
"Live Again"	2001	36	27	21	—	—	—	—	Animosity
"Angel's Son"	2002	15	—	11	—	—	—	28	Animosity
"Xmas Day"	2002	—	—	38	—	—	—	—	Animosity
"Enemy"	2003	30	23	10	—	—	—	—	Seasons
"Broken Down"	2004	—	—	20	—	—	—	—	Seasons
"Face to Face"	2004	—	—	22	—	—	—	—	Seasons
"Ugly"	2005	—	—	12	—	—	—	—	Next
"Failure"	2006	—	—	28	—	—	—	—	Next
"Driven"	2007	—	—	10	—	—	—	—	Alpha
"Beg to Differ"	2007	—	—	33	—	—	—	—	Alpha
"Prodigal Son"	2008	—	28	19	—	—	—	—	Chapter VII: Hope & Sorrow
"The Past" (featuring Chris Daughtry)	2008	—	29	27	—	—	—	—	Chapter VII: Hope & Sorrow
"Unraveling"	2010	—	19	7	29	29	—	—	Cold Day Memory
"Forever"	2010	—	—	18	—	—	—	—	Cold Day Memory
"Last Breath"	2011	—	—	32	—	—	—	—	Cold Day Memory
"Decay"	2013	—	20	10	—	42	—	—	Black Out the Sun
"Picture Perfect"	2013	—	—	25	—	—	—	—	Black Out the Sun
"Black" (acoustic)	2014	—	—	23	—	—	—	—	Time Travelers & Bonfires
"Thank You"	2015	—	—	12	—	40	—	—	Kill the Flaw
"Death Dance"	2016	—	—	29	—	—	—	—	Kill the Flaw
"Dirty"	2018	—	—	17	—	—	—	—	All I See Is War
"Unforgiven"	2018	—	—	32	—	—	—	—	All I See Is War
"Risen"	2019	—	—	33	—	—	—	—	All I See Is War
"The Day I Tried to Live"	2020	—	—	16	—	48	—	—	Blood & Stone
"Dying to Live"	2020	—	—	21	—	—	—	—	Blood & Stone
"Everything"	2023	—	—	6	—	27	—	—	Truth Killer
"Unbreakable"	2026	—	—	16	—	—	—	—	One
"—" denotes a recording that did not chart or was not released in that territory.

=== Promotional singles ===
List of promotional singles, showing year released and album name
Title	Year	Album
"Breathe"	1997	Strangeland soundtrack
"Denial"	1999	Home
"Licking Cream" (featuring Skin)	1999	Home
"Home"	2000	Home
"Bender" (featuring Chino Moreno and Troy McLawhorn)	2000	Home
"Going Back to Cali"	2000	Take a Bite Outta Rhyme: A Rock Tribute to Rap
"Crucified"	2002	Animosity
"Pieces"	2006	Next
"Deathstar"	2006	Alpha
"Inside"	2009	Chapter VII: Hope & Sorrow
"Falcons on Top"	2010	Non-album single
"Ride Insane"	2011	Cold Day Memory
"Not Today"	2015	Kill the Flaw
"Not Original"	2018	All I See Is War
"Medicated"	2018	All I See Is War
"Blood from a Stone"	2020	Blood & Stone
"Alone"	2021	Blood & Stone
"Fence"	2023	Truth Killer
"Holy Water"	2023	Truth Killer
"Superficial Drug"	2023	Truth Killer
"Is This the Real You?"	2026	One
"Threshold"	2026	One
"Construct"	2026	One

== Guest appearances ==
List of non-single guest appearances, showing year released and album name
Title	Year	Album
"Terminator (Breathe Remix)"	1999	MTV Celebrity Deathmatch
"Fall"	2000	Scream 3 soundtrack
"What U See Is What U Get" (with Xzibit)	2000	Loud Rocks
"I Am (I'm Me)"	2001	Twisted Forever
"Corrected"	2002	The Scorpion King soundtrack
"Break the Walls Down"	2002	WWF: Forceable Entry
"Leech"	2003	Freddy vs. Jason soundtrack

== Music videos ==
List of music videos, showing year released and director
Title	Year	Director(s)
"Black"	1997	Mark Haefeli
"Bitch"	1998	Mark Haefeli
"Denial"	1999	Paul Andresen
"Waffle"	1999	Marcos Siega
"Licking Cream" (featuring Skin)	2000	Ben Joe Dempsey
"Bender" (featuring Chino Moreno)	2000	Ian Barrett
"Praise"	2001	Glen Bennett
"Angel's Son"	2001	Noble Jones
"Live Again"	2002	Noble Jones
"Enemy"	2003	Adam Polina
"Broken Down"	2004	Fran Strine
"Ugly"	2005	P. R. Brown
"Pieces"	2006	Fran Strine
"Driven"	2007	Marc Vadeboncoeur, Morgan Murphy
"Beg to Differ"	2007	Morgan Murphy
"Prodigal Son"	2008	Jason Sciavicco, Tim Walbert
"Unraveling"	2010	Rafael Alcantara
"Falcons on Top"	2010	Dale Resteghini
"Decay"	2013	Davo
"Dirty"	2018	Caleb Mallery
"Not Original"	2018	Caleb Mallery
"Medicated"	2018	Caleb Mallery
"Unforgiven"	2018	Scott Hansen
"Risen"	2019	Dan Sturgess
"Dying to Live"	2020	Jensen Noen
"Fence"	2023	Ollie Jones
"Everything"	2023	J.T. Ibanez
"Holy Water"	2023	J.T. Ibanez
"Superficial Drug"	2023	J.T. Ibanez
"Is This the Real You?"	2026	Paul Ribera
"Unbreakable"	2026	Dan Sturgess
"Threshold"	2026	Ollie Jones
