= Retrospect (Sevendust album) =

Video by Sevendust
- Released: September 11, 2001
- Genre: Nu metal, alternative metal, hard rock
- Label: TVT
- Director: Ian Barret

Sevendust chronology
Live and Loud (1998)	Retrospect (2001)

Retrospect is the second video album by American rock band Sevendust, featuring behind-the-scenes footage, music videos, and live performances. It was released in DVD on August 14, 2001.

== Track listing ==
1. Retrospect – History of Sevendust
2. Retrospect – The first album Sevendust
3. Retrospect – The second album Home
4. Retrospect – Woodstock 1999
5. Retrospect – Lynn Strait / "Angel's Son"
6. Retrospect – Preview of Animosity
7. Live and Loud – "Too Close to Hate"
8. Live and Loud – "Bitch"
9. "Denial" (music video)
10. "Waffle" (music video)
11. "Licking Cream" (music video)
12. "Angel's Son"
13. "Angel's Son" – The Tonight Show with Jay Leno
14. "Waffle" – Late Night with Conan O'Brien
15. "Angel's Son" – Worcester Centrum (2000)
16. "Black" – The Palladium (1998)
17. "Rumblefish" – Woodstock (1999)
18. Electronic Press Kit (1997)

== Personnel ==
- Lajon Witherspoon – vocals
- Clint Lowery – lead guitar, backing vocals
- John Connolly – rhythm guitar
- Vinnie Hornsby – bass guitar
- Morgan Rose – drums, backing vocals
