= Time Travelers & Bonfires =

Studio album by Sevendust
- Released: April 15, 2014
- Recorded: January 2014
- Studio: Architekt Music in Butler, New Jersey
- Genre: Acoustic rock
- Length: 50:33
- Labels: Asylum, 7Bros.
- Producer: Sevendust

Sevendust chronology
Black Out the Sun (2013)	Time Travelers & Bonfires (2014)	Kill the Flaw (2015)

Singles from Time Travelers & Bonfires
- 1. "Black (acoustic)" Released: March 25, 2014

Time Travelers & Bonfires is the tenth studio album by the American rock band Sevendust, released on April 15, 2014. It includes several previously released songs re-recorded as acoustic versions, as well as six new acoustic tracks. Although the band released their critically acclaimed Southside Double-Wide: Acoustic Live in 2004, Time Travelers & Bonfires is their first acoustic studio album. The album sold around 15,000 copies in the United States in its first week of release to debut at position No. 19 on The Billboard 200 chart.

== Writing and production ==
On November 22, 2013, Sevendust partnered with PledgeMusic for a direct-to-fan campaign to help fund the creation of Time Travelers & Bonfires and was set to last 130 days. It is said they reached their goal over the course of the first weekend. Therefore, the band reconvened at Architekt Studios in Butler, New Jersey, where they recorded their ninth studio album, to work on six brand-new songs which had been written and recorded for the acoustic album and re-recorded some of their previous released songs and fan-selected cuts from their catalog included "Black", "Gone", "Denial", "Karma", "Trust" and "Crucified" in the sounds of acoustics.

Lead singer Lajon Witherspoon stated that the band decided to do an acoustic studio album after the strong positive reaction Southside Double-Wide received from their fanbase. Also Morgan Rose explained that the band looked into utilizing PledgeMusic upon the suggestion of their band manager, and pursued it because it allowed for close communication and feedback from the fanbase.

"Time Travelers & Bonfires was a perfect way to revisit some older songs and give them a different twist and it gives us a chance to showcase the melodic side of the band and focus on vocals."

— Clint Lowery on writing Time Travelers & Bonfires

Time Travelers & Bonfires is the follow-up to Sevendust's ninth studio album, Black Out the Sun, which debuted at #1 on Billboard's "Top Hard Music Albums" chart.

== Touring ==
Following the release of album, Sevendust started "An Evening With Sevendust" acoustic tour, which was kicked off in Athens, Georgia at the Georgia Theatre on April 1, 2014. It's their first acoustic tour since 2004, when they were touring in support of their fourth album, Seasons. Also, the band recently announced that they planned for a second leg to "An Evening With" acoustic trek, which started in St. Louis on May 27 and went through June 28, 2014, ending in Kent, Connecticut. According to Clint Lowery, the two legs would cover most of the areas of the United States.

Sevendust also added dates for the final leg of acoustic tour. Dates began on November 4 and ran through November 26, 2014.

== Reception ==
Professional ratings
Review scores
Source	Rating
Allmusic	3/5 stars
About.com	3.5/5 stars
Rate Your Music	3.73/5 stars
KNAC	5/5 stars
Rock Revolt Magazine	5/5 stars
AntiHero Magazine	10/10

The album received generally favorable reviews from music critics. Gregory Heaney from Allmusic gave the album three out of five stars, commenting that "Time Travelers & Bonfires gives fans of the band a clearer look at the emotional core that lives at the heart of Sevendust's music, further stressing the importance of singer Lajon Witherspoon's vocal performances." The About.com review gave the album three and a half out of five stars, praising the Lajon Witherspoon's voice, saying that "Witherspoon is the focus on all the songs and especially so on Come Down. He is always been a controlled modulator of the melody, a vocalist who gets it right and never leaves a bad aftertaste." Thomas Woroniak from Rock Revolt Magazine stated "Time Travelers & Bonfires shines with energy throughout the twelve tracks...This is a must have for any Sevendust fan of old and the acoustic format potentially opens their music to a wider demographic...just as intense as any of their previous studio releases."

The album was Revolver's album of the week upon its release.

== Singles ==
"Black" is the album's first single and is currently available on iTunes and other digital outlets. The song climbed the Billboard Hot Mainstream Rock Tracks, reaching number 23.

== Track listing ==
No.	Title	Writer(s)	Length
1.	"Come Down"	Clint Lowery	4:04
2.	"Under It All"	Lowery	3:59
3.	"The Wait"	Lowery, John Connolly	4:23
4.	"Upbeat Sugar"	Lowery, Connolly, Morgan Rose, Lajon Witherspoon, Vinnie Hornsby	3:52
5.	"One Life"	Lowery, Connolly, Rose, Witherspoon, Hornsby	4:25
6.	"Bonfire"	Lowery, Rose	3:56
7.	"Gone" (from Seasons, 2003)	Lowery, Rose	3:35
8.	"Denial" (from Home, 1999)	Lowery, Rose	4:12
9.	"Trust" (from Animosity, 2001)	Lowery, Witherspoon	5:06
10.	"Crucified" (from Animosity, 2001)	Lowery, Rose, Witherspoon	4:43
11.	"Karma" (from Cold Day Memory, 2010)	Lowery, Rose	3:41
12.	"Black" (from Sevendust, 1997)	Lowery, Connolly, Rose, Witherspoon, Hornsby	4:32
Total length:			50:33

== Personnel ==
Band

- Lajon Witherspoon - lead vocals
- Clint Lowery - acoustic guitars, guitars, backing vocals, producer
- John Connolly - acoustic guitars, backing vocals
- Vinnie Hornsby - bass guitar
- Morgan Rose - drums, backing vocals

Other

- Mike Ferretti - recording engineer, mixing engineer
- Kurt Wubbenhorst - keyboards and sound design
- William Schneider - assistant engineer
- Andy VanDette - mastering
- Jim Ansell - artwork, layout design, photography
- George Roskos - logistics, transportation
