= Retrospective 2 =

Compilation album by Sevendust
- Released: December 11, 2007
- Genre: Alternative metal
- Length: 40:36
- Label: 7Bros.; Asylum

Sevendust chronology
Alpha (2007)	Retrospective 2 (2007)	Chapter VII: Hope & Sorrow (2008)

Professional ratings
Review scores
Source	Rating
AllMusic	2.5/5 stars

Retrospective 2 is the second compilation album by the American rock band Sevendust. It is a follow-up to the Retrospect DVD, released in 2001. The compilation covers Next and Alpha, and does not contain any material from Animosity or Seasons. It also comes with a DVD which has the makings of the albums, Next and Alpha, as well as music videos and live performances.

== Track listing ==
All tracks are written by Sevendust.

No.	Title	Length
1.	"Losing You"	4:30
2.	"The Rim"	3:15
3.	"Sleeper"	5:32
4.	"Hero" (Live)	4:32
5.	"Silence" (Live)	4:12
6.	"Deathstar" (Live)	5:09
7.	"Clueless" (Live)	4:13
8.	"Beg to Differ" (Live)	5:03
9.	"Alpha" (Live)	4:10

Bonus track listing
No.	Title	Length
10.	"A Day in the Life of Sevendust"
11.	"Ugly"
12.	"Pieces"
13.	"Too Close to Hate"
14.	"Hero" (Live)
15.	"Silence" (Live)
16.	"Driven"
17.	"Beg to Differ"
18.	"The Rim"
19.	"Deathstar" (Live)
20.	"Clueless" (Live)
21.	"Alpha" (Live)
22.	"Bitch" (Live)
