= Best Of (Chapter One 1997–2004) =

Compilation album by Sevendust
- Released: December 27, 2005
- Genre: Alternative metal; nu metal
- Length: 61:03
- Label: TVT
- Producer: Various

Sevendust chronology
Next (2005)	Best Of (Chapter One 1997–2004) (2005)	Alpha (2007)

Professional ratings
Review scores
Source	Rating
AllMusic	3.5/5 stars
PopMatters	6/10

Best Of (Chapter One 1997–2004) is the first compilation album by the American rock band Sevendust. It was released on December 27, 2005, by TVT Records.

== Track listing ==
No.	Title	Original album	Length
1.	"Black"	Sevendust (1997)	4:08
2.	"Bitch"	Sevendust (1997)	3:41
3.	"Too Close to Hate"	Sevendust (1997)	4:48
4.	"Denial"	Home (1999)	4:17
5.	"Waffle" (Tom Lord-Alge Mix)	Home (1999)	3:30
6.	"Assdrop" (listed as "Rumble Fish" on Home)	Home (1999)	3:22
7.	"Bender" (featuring Chino Moreno & Troy McLawhorn)	Home (1999)	3:45
8.	"Angel's Son"	Animosity (2001)	3:49
9.	"Praise"	Animosity (2001)	3:40
10.	"Follow" (featuring Aaron Lewis)	Animosity (2001)	4:34
11.	"Enemy"	Seasons (2003)	3:03
12.	"Face to Face"	Seasons (2003)	3:55
13.	"Coward"	Seasons b-side (2003)	3:35
14.	"Rain"	Seasons b-side (2003)	3:35
15.	"Inner City Blues" (Marvin Gaye cover)	Seasons bonus DVD (2003)	3:31
16.	"School's Out" (Alice Cooper cover)	Sevendust b-side (1997)	3:30
Total length:			61:03

== Charts ==
Chart (2006)	Position
Billboard 200	156
Independent Albums	8
