= Waffle (song) =

Single by Sevendust

from the album Home
- Released: 2000
- Studio: Long View Farm (North Brookfield, Massachusetts)
- Genre: Nu metal
- Length: 3:30
- Label: TVT; Festival Mushroom
- Composers: John Connolly; Vinnie Hornsby; Clint Lowery; Morgan Rose; Lajon Witherspoon
- Lyricists: Clint Lowery; Morgan Rose; Lajon Witherspoon
- Producers: Toby Wright; Sevendust

Sevendust singles chronology
"Licking Cream" (1999)	"Waffle" (2000)	"Home" (2000)

Music video
- "Waffle" on YouTube

"Waffle" is a song by the American rock band Sevendust. It was released as a single from the band's second studio album, Home (1999).

Two different versions of the song exist. One is the version that's on the album, while the other, mixed by Tom Lord-Alge, is the one used as the single. The Tom Lord-Alge mix is the one used on Best Of (Chapter One 1997–2004). "Waffle" peaked at No. 23 and No. 33 on Billboard's Mainstream Rock and Modern Rock Tracks charts, respectively.

According to Morgan Rose, the song's title was unknowingly coined by Sharon Osbourne, during a phone call he had with her while the band was writing the song.

== Track listing ==
No.	Title	Length
1.	"Waffle"	3:30
2.	"Black" (live)	4:13
3.	"Speak" (live)	3:26
4.	"Too Close to Hate" (live)	4:04
5.	"Bitch" (live)	3:45

Notes

- All live songs were recorded live at the Metro in Chicago, Illinois, during the Live and Loud TV special, which can be located on the Retrospect DVD.

== Charts ==
Chart (2000)	Peak position
Australia (ARIA)	77

== Release history ==
Year	Album	Label	Ref.
1999	Home	Dream On	
1999	Home (Japan)	Import	
2000	Gravity Games 2000: Summer Sounds, Vol. 1	PolyGram	
2000	Naked 4-Play	Wicked Disc	
2000	Rock Hard: TVT Rock 2000	TVT Records	
2000	Tattoo the Earth: The First Crusade	1500 Records	
2000	Tattoo the Earth: The First Crusade (clean)	1500 Records	
2005	Best Of (Chapter One 1997–2004)	TVT Records	
2005	Best Of (Chapter One 1997–2004) (clean)	TVT Records	
