= Southside Double-Wide: Acoustic Live =

Live album by Sevendust
- Released: May 4, 2004
- Recorded: September 12, 2003
- Venue: Georgia Theatre, Athens, Georgia, U.S.
- Genre: Acoustic rock
- Length: 62:26
- Label: TVT

Sevendust chronology
Seasons (2003)	Southside Double-Wide: Acoustic Live (2004)	Next (2005)

Southside Double-Wide: Acoustic Live is the first live album by the American rock band Sevendust. It is a live recording of the band's September 12, 2003, performance at the Georgia Theatre in Athens, Georgia. It includes a bonus DVD with the entire album performed live, and also comes in a special cardboard package that includes a set of lithographed pictures of the show.

== Track listing ==
No.	Title	Album	Length
1.	"Trust"	Animosity	5:18
2.	"Seasons"	Seasons	3:48
3.	"Xmas Day"	Animosity	5:17
4.	"Beautiful"	Animosity	4:07
5.	"Follow"	Animosity	4:27
6.	"Skeleton Song"	Seasons	4:22
7.	"Disgrace"	Seasons	3:55
8.	"Hurt" (Nine Inch Nails cover from The Downward Spiral)	Southside Double-Wide: Acoustic Live	4:07
9.	"Angel's Son" (Snot cover from Strait Up)	Southside Double-Wide: Acoustic Live	3:45
10.	"Rumble Fish"	Home	4:10
11.	"Too Close to Hate"	Sevendust	4:46
12.	"Black"	Sevendust	4:49
13.	"Prayer"	Sevendust	3:09
14.	"Bitch"	Sevendust	2:52
15.	"Broken Down" (Studio Acoustic Version)	Seasons	3:34
Total length:			62:26

== Reception ==
Professional ratings
Review scores
Source	Rating
AllMusic	4/5 stars

=== Chart positions ===
Chart	Peak position
Billboard 200	90
Independent Albums	1

== Personnel ==
=== Sevendust ===
- Lajon Witherspoon – lead vocals (1–7, & 9–15) & co-song writing (1, 4, & 9–14)
- Clint Lowery – acoustic guitar, co-vocals, lead vocals on "Hurt", & co-song writing (1–7, & 9–14)
- John Connolly – acoustic & guitar, backing vocals, & co-song writing (11–14)
- Vinnie Hornsby – bass guitar, backing vocals, & co-song writing (11–14)
- Morgan Rose – drums, backing vocals, & co-song writing (4, 6, 7, 9, & 10–15)

=== Co-Song writers ===
- Butch Walker – on "Seasons"
- Trent Reznor – on "Hurt"
- Mikey Dolan – on "Angel's Son"
