= Human (Projected album) =

Studio album by Projected
- Released: September 18, 2012
- Genre: Hard rock; alternative metal
- Length: 41:58
- Label: 1119
- Producer: John Connolly; Michael Baskette (co.)

Projected chronology
Human (2012)	Ignite My Insanity (2017)

Singles from Human
- 1. "Watch It Burn" Released: August 7, 2012

Human is the debut album by American hard rock band Projected. It was released on September 18, 2012. Initially envisioned as a solo project by founder John Connolly, the project eventually grew into a full-fledged band involving a number of musicians that he had intentions of working with, namely Scott Phillips of Creed and Alter Bridge, and Eric Friedman of Submersed. The album received generally positive reception but limited public exposure, as little promotion of the album in the way of touring was possible due to members' commitments to their respective bands.

== Background ==
After completing the recording and touring for Sevendust's eighth studio album, Cold Day Memory, guitarist John Connolly desired to branch out to a new project in the downtime before working on what would become their ninth album, Black Out the Sun. He originally envisioned doing a solo album where he would play all the instruments and sing all the vocals, much in the same vein as Dave Grohl's first album under the Foo Fighters name, Foo Fighters. However, before really starting on it, he spoke with a number of other musicians who he had spoken with working on material with over the years, and ended up working with them as well.

The band recorded as a four piece, with each of the members coming from different bands. Connolly and Vinnie Hornsby had both played together for many years in the alternative metal band Sevendust, as the guitarist and bassist respectively. Eric Friedman had previously been the guitarist for the now-defunct band Submersed, and Scott Phillips is the drummer for Creed and Alter Bridge. Members had other past connections as well. Creed had toured with Sevendust in the past, such as for Woodstock 99. Friedman had worked members of Creed in the past; Phillips played drums for half the tracks on Submersed's first album, In Due Time, while Creed guitarist Mark Tremonti produced the album and played on one track. Additionally, Friedman later contributed to Tremonti's 2012 solo project, and respective album, All I Was.

Connolly summarized how the recording lineup fell into place:

...we said we're just going to go in here and have fun with this. We had a bunch of songs lying around that we wanted to take in. Originally, it was just going to be me going in there and doing most everything. The more we talked about it and the more we got together a game plan and studio time, the more we kind of started talking about, "Hey, Scott, remember ten years ago when we first talked about doing that thing, that side project? Well, what are you doing in March?" [laughs] Literally, it was pretty much that. Erock [Eric Friedman] was like, "Hey, man I want to get in on this." I had already talked to Vinnie about doing it, because we knew that [fellow Sevendust members] Morgan Rose and Clint Lowery were going to be doing Call Me No One. It literally came together, for lack of a better description and explanation for how it really happened. It wasn't like I sat down and said, here is my top fifty drummers that I'm going to go after, here's my top 25 guitar players — it wasn't that at all. It was just us saying, "Hey, man, let's just go in and do what we always said we were going to do." I think the end result at the end of the day surprised us just as much as it surprised everyone else.

== Recording and composition ==
The band began formally recording the album in February 2012. The album was self-produced, and recorded in Connolly's private recording home-based studio. Connolly stated this approach came with both its benefits and its difficulties:

...being a singer recording in your own house in a neighborhood, which is very interesting. It was probably the most bizarre recording schedule I’ve ever been on. Actually tracked the vocals from about 8:30 in the morning till about 11:00/11:30/noon, somewhere around there, because it was the only time of the day where I could get complete quiet in the neighborhood. It’s either that or UPS trucks or here comes the landscapers down the street...It’s a great concept to go, “Yeah, yeah, we’re just going to make a record in the house,” then all of a sudden you start doing it and, wait a minute, turn the Wii off, I can hear Just Dance coming through. And the landscapers are definitely in a couple of songs for sure. I heard it and we buried it enough..But just coming to terms with the sound of your voice and doing it here at home, kind of where I can do it by myself and critique the shit out of it, it’s tough when you step out for the first time and you go, I need to become a lead singer. How do you do that? So I had to really kind of sit down and do a little bit of homework and figure out what my strengths were, things I did better than others, what you want to do but don’t want to overdue [sic].

The track "12804" was written as a tribute to Pantera guitarist Dimebag Darrell, who was shot and killed while performing at a concert on December 8, 2004 (12/8/04). The track "Bring You Back" features guest vocals by Connolly and Hornsby's Sevendust bandmate Lajon Witherspoon.

Connolly said that the band took inspiration from bands such as the Foo Fighters and A Perfect Circle in a sound he described as "sorta heavy, just not real metal."

== Release and promotion ==
The band had a contest on their Facebook allowing for fans to submit their artwork for the album, with the band choosing their favorite to appear within the album booklet. Similarly, the band held a poll on Facebook to see which song should be the album's first single. The three options were "HELLo", "Watch It Burn", and "Closure". Additionally, a local radio DJ that Connolly knew, also played "HELLo" and "Watch It Burn" for feedback. While Conolly had originally felt that "HELLo" would be the best choice, the band ended up going with "Watch it Burn" because it received far more support than other songs in both scenarios.

Conolly has stated that he desires to perform the album live, but if and when will ultimately come down to the availability of members and their respective bands.

== Reception ==
The album has received mostly positive reviews. Lithium Magazine strongly praised the album, stating, "To say that this band is more than the sum of their parts just doesn’t seem to cut it. The songs on this disc are, plainly put, awesome! With a natural, un-contrived flow from track to track, you can actually hear that these cats are friends who just wanted to jam, without anyone fighting to put their own stamp on the tunes...Projected takes you on a furious flight, a musical journey that is at once both familiar and exhilaratingly new." The New Review praised the album for being "...a quality release worth checking out for fans of early-2000s era hard rock along the lines of Disturbed, Crossfade, Godsmack and Seether." Metalholics praised the album as well, giving it an "8.7 out of 10" rating and stating that the album "...is more than a mere 'side' project or vanity recording. Projected has legs and Human offers complexity and depth you can sink your ears into. This is a complete album one can listen to repeatedly without the need to skip tracks." Jam Magazine stated that "All eleven songs on Human are solid, well-crafted tunes that prove to be a great listen from beginning to end. You can really hear and feel this music. Each member made sure to add their own unique signature to the music despite the well-known sounds they created with previous projects." Broken Records Magazine called the album a "unique masterpiece".

The album was Revolver's album of the week upon its release.

== Track listing ==
1. "Into" - 1:29
2. "HELLo" - 3:38
3. "Watch It Burn" - 4:25
4. "So Low" - 4:21
5. "Bring You Back" - 3:58
6. "12804" - 4:04
7. "Alive" - 3:50
8. "The Crown" - 4:31
9. "Stella" - 4:37
10. "Closure" - 3:36
11. "Breaking Me" - 3:29

== Personnel ==
=== Projected ===
- John Connolly – lead vocals, guitar, production, engineering, programming
- Eric Friedman – guitar, backing vocals, programming
- Vinnie Hornsby – bass guitar
- Scott Phillips – drums

=== Production ===
- Michael "Elvis" Baskette – co-producer, mixing, string arrangements
- Jef Moll – editing, programming
- Bill Papp – engineer
- Jacob Crabb – engineer
- Ryan Denman – engineer
- Ted Jensen – mastering
