= Driven (Sevendust song) =

Single by Sevendust

from the album Alpha
- Released: February 13, 2007
- Studio: Tree Sound (Atlanta, Georgia)
- Length: 3:48
- Label: Asylum
- Songwriters: John Connolly; Shawn Grove; Vinnie Hornsby; Sonny Mayo; Morgan Rose; Lajon Witherspoon
- Producers: John Connolly; Morgan Rose; Shawn Grove

Sevendust singles chronology
"Failure" (2006)	"Driven" (2007)	"Beg to Differ" (2007)

Music video
- "Driven" on YouTube

"Driven" is a song by the American rock band Sevendust. It was released on February 13, 2007, as the lead single from their sixth studio album, Alpha (2007). "Driven" was the band's highest charting single (matched only by "Enemy"), peaking at No. 10 on Billboard's Mainstream Rock chart, and since surpassed by "Unraveling" and "Everything", which peaked at No. 7. and No. 6, respectively, on the same chart.

== Music video ==
The music video for "Driven", which was shot in New Hampshire during the band's rehearsal for their 2007 tour, features rare behind-the-scenes footage of the band's members as they prepare material from their sixth studio album, Alpha (2007). The video debuted nationwide on March 3 and was featured on the "Headbangers Ball" program on cable channel MTV2 on March 10.

== Charts ==
=== Weekly charts ===
Weekly chart performance for "Driven"
Chart (2007)	Peak position
US Mainstream Rock (Billboard)	10

=== Year-end charts ===
Year-end chart performance for "Driven"
Chart (2007)	Position
US Mainstream Rock Songs (Billboard)	32
