= One (Sevendust album) =

Studio album by Sevendust
- Released: May 1, 2026
- Studio: Studio Barbarosa in Gotha, Florida
- Genres: Alternative metal; hard rock
- Length: 39:59
- Label: Napalm
- Producer: Michael "Elvis" Baskette

Sevendust chronology
Truth Killer (2023)	One (2026)

Singles from One
- 1. "Is This the Real You" Released: January 29, 2026; 2. "Unbreakable" Released: March 5, 2026; 3. "Threshold" Released: April 2, 2026; 4. "Construct" Released: April 30, 2026

One is the fifteenth studio album by the American rock band Sevendust. The album was released on May 1, 2026, by Napalm Records. Four songs were showcased from the album ahead of its full release; the lead single "Unbreakable", along with three other promotional songs and singles "Is This the Real You", "Threshold", and "Construct".

== Writing and recording ==
One was written during the initial creative sessions for the album, which began in early 2025 at the farmhouse of Lajon Witherspoon and was officially recorded at Studio Barbarosa in Gotha, Florida, in the fall of 2025. It was produced by the band’s longtime collaborator Michael "Elvis" Baskette, who also handled the mixing. The engineering was provided by Jef Moll and Josh Saldate.

== Release and promotion ==
On January 21, 2026, Sevendust announced their fifteenth studio album One. On January 29, they released the album's lead promotional single and first overall "Is This the Real You". On March 5, the band released the lead single and second overall "Unbreakable". On April 2, Sevendust released the second promotional single and third overall "Threshold". On April 30, they released the third promotional single and fourth overall "Construct", which was the last, one day before the release of the album One.

In addition to a headlining US tour alongside Atreyu, Fire from the Gods, and American Adrenaline, Sevendust also booked various festival appearances throughout 2026 in support of One.

== Reception ==
Professional ratings
Review scores
Source	Rating
Blabbermouth.net	9/10
Distorted Sound	8/10
Kerrang!	3/5
Spill Magazine	4.5/5 stars

=== Commercial performance ===
"Unbreakable" peaked at No. 21 on the Mainstream Rock Tracks chart, which continued Sevendust's streak of appearances on the aforementioned chart (dating back to their self-titled debut album). One became the group's first record to miss the Billboard 200 albums chart.

=== Critical reception ===
Kerrang! praised the album, concluding that "Yes, it's easy to be cynical about bands like Sevendust who essentially offer different takes on the same thing. But when it's this consistent, this unstoppable, it does make you step back and salute the hard-working progenitors, in this case a quintet that have mastered their art.

== Track listing ==
All tracks are written by Sevendust.

No.	Title	Length
1.	"One"	3:48
2.	"Unbreakable"	4:11
3.	"Is This the Real You"	3:47
4.	"Threshold"	3:40
5.	"We Won"	3:52
6.	"Construct"	3:57
7.	"Bright Side"	3:36
8.	"The Drop"	3:50
9.	"Blood Price"	4:01
10.	"Misdirection"	5:13
Total length:		39:59

== Personnel ==
Sevendust

- Lajon Witherspoon – lead vocals
- Clint Lowery – lead guitar, backing vocals
- John Connolly – rhythm guitar, lead vocals on "Misdirection", backing vocals
- Vinnie Hornsby – bass
- Morgan Rose – drums, backing vocals

Technical and artistic personnel

- Michael "Elvis" Baskette – production, mixing
- Jef Moll – engineering, digital editing
- Josh Saldate – assistant engineer
- Brad Blackwood – mastering
- Chuck Brueckmann – photography
- Alan Ashcraft – art direction, design

== Charts ==
Chart performance for One
Chart (2026)	Peak position
Australian Albums (ARIA)	92
French Rock & Metal Albums (SNEP)	80
UK Album Downloads (Official Charts)	60
UK Independent Album Breakers (OCC)	14
UK Rock & Metal Albums (Official Charts)	16
US Independent Albums (Billboard)	43
US Top Album Sales (Billboard)	12
US Top Hard Rock Albums (Billboard)	20
