= The Past (Sevendust song) =

Single by Sevendust featuring Chris Daughtry

from the album Chapter VII: Hope & Sorrow
- Released: July 29, 2008
- Length: 3:53
- Label: Asylum
- Songwriters: John Connolly; Shawn Grove; Vinnie Hornsby; Sonny Mayo; Morgan Rose; Lajon Witherspoon
- Producers: John Connolly; Morgan Rose; Shawn Grove

Sevendust singles chronology
"Prodigal Son" (2008)	"The Past" (2008)	"Unraveling" (2010)

"The Past" is a song by the American rock band Sevendust. Featuring a guest appearance by vocalist Chris Daughtry, it was released as the second and final single from the band's seventh studio album, Chapter VII: Hope & Sorrow (2008).

== Controversy ==
Florida TV station WFTV-Channel 9 reported that "The Past" was played repeatedly by Casey Anthony, who had been charged with first-degree murder in the disappearance of her daughter, Caylee while she was out on bond. The track carries this lyric: "Beneath the water that's falling from my eyes, Lays a soul I've left behind." The song was also apparently a topic of discussion on "Nancy Grace", a nightly current affairs show on CNN's Headline News hosted by Nancy Ann Grace, an American legal commentator, television host, and former prosecutor.

Sevendust has issued the following statement regarding the matter, "After hearing the news that our song "The Past" was a topic of discussion on the Nancy Grace show yesterday, we would like to elaborate. The song was written as a song of hope. A song with positive message. To look back on your life and reflect and to feel good about getting through the rough times that everyone goes through, the roller coaster of life, so to speak." Also they added, "We regret that we've been linked to the horrible subject involving the disappearance of little Caylee Anthony. Most of us have children and have been saddened by the story from the beginning."

== Charts ==
Chart (2008)	Peak position
US Mainstream Rock (Billboard)	27
