= Chapter VII: Hope & Sorrow =

Studio album by Sevendust
- Released: April 1, 2008
- Studio: Tree Sound (Atlanta, Georgia)
- Genre: Alternative metal
- Length: 49:03
- Labels: 7Bros.; Asylum
- Producers: John Connolly; Morgan Rose; Shawn Grove

Sevendust chronology
Retrospective 2 (2007)	Chapter VII: Hope & Sorrow (2008)	Cold Day Memory (2010)

Singles from Chapter VII: Hope & Sorrow
- 1. "Prodigal Son" Released: February 19, 2008; 2. "The Past" Released: July 29, 2008

Professional ratings
Review scores
Source	Rating
AllMusic	3/5 stars
Blabbermouth	6.5/10 stars
Bullz-Eye	4/5 stars
Live Metal	9.5/10 stars
TuneLab Music	9.5/10 stars

Chapter VII: Hope & Sorrow is the seventh studio album by the American rock band Sevendust. It was released on April 1, 2008, through the band's own label, 7 Bros. Records, in conjunction with Warner Music Group's Independent Label Group. It was also the last album to feature guitarist Sonny Mayo, who was replaced by original guitarist Clint Lowery before its release. The album features guest appearances by Chris Daughtry (Daughtry), Myles Kennedy (Alter Bridge, Slash), and Mark Tremonti (Alter Bridge, Tremonti, Creed).

== Track listing ==
All tracks are written by Sevendust.

No.	Title	Length
1.	"Inside"	4:36
2.	"Enough"	4:34
3.	"Hope" (featuring Mark Tremonti)	4:42
4.	"Scapegoat"	3:55
5.	"Fear"	5:06
6.	"The Past" (featuring Chris Daughtry)	3:53
7.	"Prodigal Son"	3:33
8.	"Lifeless"	4:34
9.	"Sorrow" (featuring Myles Kennedy)	4:49
10.	"Contradiction"	3:24
11.	"Walk Away"	6:34
Total length:		49:03

Best Buy bonus tracks
No.	Title	Length
12.	"Lucky One"	3:05
13.	"Heart in Your Hands"	3:35

iTunes bonus track
No.	Title	Length
13.	"Disgust"	3:40

== Personnel ==
Sevendust

- Lajon Witherspoon – lead vocals
- John Connolly – lead guitar, backing vocals
- Sonny Mayo – rhythm guitar
- Vinnie Hornsby – bass
- Morgan Rose – drums, backing vocals

Additional personnel

- John Connolly – producer
- Morgan Rose – producer
- Shawn Grove – producer, engineer, editing
- Travis Daniels – assistant engineer, editing, programming,
- Lee Stoker – additional engineering
- Jason Suecof – additional engineering
- Ted Jensen – mastering
- Raegan Wexler – editing, programming, drum technician
- Jason Cook – guitar technician
- Mark Tremonti – lead guitar (3)
- Chris Daughtry – additional vocals (6)
- Myles Kennedy – additional vocals (9)
- John Mark Painter – strings arranger and engineer
- The Love Sponge Strings
  - David Davidson – violin
  - David Angell – violin
  - Kristin Wilkinson – viola
  - John Catchings – cello

== Charts ==
=== Album ===
Year	Chart	Position	Ref.
2008	The Billboard 200	19	
2008	Top Hard Rock Albums	12	
2008	Top Rock Albums	9	
2008	Top Modern Rock/Alternative Albums	6	
2008	Top Digital Albums	19	

=== Singles ===
Year	Song	Chart	Position
2008	"Prodigal Son"	Mainstream Rock Tracks	19
2008	"The Past"	Mainstream Rock Tracks	27
