= Black Out the Sun (album) =

Studio album by Sevendust
- Released: March 26, 2013
- Studio: Architekt Music (Butler, New Jersey)
- Genre: Alternative metal; nu metal
- Length: 44:23
- Label: 7Bros.; Asylum
- Producer: Sevendust

Sevendust chronology
Cold Day Memory (2010)	Black Out the Sun (2013)	Time Travelers & Bonfires (2014)

Singles from Black Out the Sun
- 1. "Decay" Released: January 22, 2013; 2. "Picture Perfect" Released: August 6, 2013

Black Out the Sun is the ninth studio album by American rock band Sevendust, released on March 26, 2013, through 7Bros. and Asylum Records.

== Background ==
Black Out the Sun marks the band's first album in almost three years. After concluding touring in support of their eighth studio album, Cold Day Memory, many of the members spent 2012 working on side projects, with guitarist Clint Lowery and drummer Morgan Rose forming Call Me No One and releasing Last Parade. Concurrently, guitarist John Connolly and bassist Vinnie Hornsby formed Projected and released Human. By the end of the year, the members reunited and began collective work on Black Out the Sun.

=== Writing and recording ===
Rose stated that the band took the same approach to the album as he and Lowery had with making Last Parade, stating:

"For that album we went in with very little material, and it was really exciting and we had a good time doing it...It was fresh. We didn't over think stuff too much. So we kinda sold the rest of the guys on trying to do it that way. We were maybe a little apprehensive going in, but it worked exactly the way we had hoped. We didn't have any songs, but everybody grabbed their station and kind of picked up whatever needed help or work, and we were able to bang out it with nothing but riffs. It was really from the cuff..."

The exception to this was the band's first single, "Decay", which had a riff that originated from the Cold Day Memory sessions, but the band had waited to finish it for Black Out the Sun, in fear they were too burned out to do it justice originally.

The album was recorded at Architekt Music Studios in Butler, New Jersey. Witherspoon stated that the album's title was chosen due a dream of his, stating, "In the dream, the sun was going away and I was just looking for safety before it happened and not necessarily knowing what would happened [sic] when it blacked out but just knowing that something was scary. I guess it just seems more like the feeling of the unknown."

=== Sound ===
Connolly described the album's sound as having "a darker vibe", with "still plenty of melody", comparing it more to the band's earlier albums Animosity, Alpha and Sevendust and that it "is almost like a greatest-hits record of songs you've never heard before." Lowery described the album's sound as "spontaneous" and said that it "has the spirit of our older records, but it's evolved as well".

== Critical reception ==
Professional ratings
Review scores
Source	Rating
AbsolutePunk	85%
About.com	4/5 stars
AllMusic	3.5/5 stars
Blabbermouth.net	7/10
Loudwire	4/5 stars
KNAC	5/5 stars
PopMatters	9/10

The album received critical acclaim on release. Artist Direct gave a positive review, saying "it's like they've transmuted the ferocity of their classic self-titled debut, Home, and Animosity into the sharp, succinct songwriting sensibility of Cold Day Memory." Similarly AllMusic stated that "Black Out The Sun is such a solidly constructed album that it's hard to fault these guys for doing what they do best and giving the people the kind of skull-crushing hard rock that they're asking for." Larry Petro from KNAC gave the album 5 out of 5, stating, "I absolutely love it when a band puts out an album that is great from start to finish, with no urge to skip a track, and that's exactly what Sevendust has done with Black Out The Sun." The Aquarian Weekly reviewer praised the album, saying, "This album shows the group remains dedicated to their craft, excited about making new music and eager to embrace the risks that go with it. And that's the kind of thing that will keep the fans excited for a good while longer." Dusty Peters from UnRated Magazine wrote, "Black Out the Sun is one of the most complete metal albums that has been released in quite some time. A fan or not of Sevendust, after listening to Black Out the Sun, you will truly experience the love that the band has for music and themselves. With over 16 years together and 9 recorded albums to their name, Sevendust has completed their musical journey to the top with Black Out the Sun."

== Commercial performance ==
The album debuted at No. 18 on the Billboard 200, and No. 5 on the Top Rock Albums chart, selling around 27,000 copies in its first week of release.

== Track listing ==
All tracks are written by John Connolly, Vinnie Hornsby, Clint Lowery, Morgan Rose and Lajon Witherspoon.

No.	Title	Length
1.	"Memory"	1:24
2.	"Faithless"	4:10
3.	"Till Death"	3:06
4.	"Mountain"	3:08
5.	"Cold as War"	4:03
6.	"Black Out the Sun"	3:27
7.	"Nobody Wants It"	3:10
8.	"Dead Roses"	3:01
9.	"Decay"	3:25
10.	"Dark AM"	3:28
11.	"Picture Perfect"	3:47
12.	"Got a Feeling"	4:32
13.	"Murder Bar"	3:42
Total length:		44:23

== Personnel ==
Sevendust

- Lajon Witherspoon – lead vocals
- Clint Lowery – lead guitar, co-lead vocals on "Till Death" and "Got a Feeling", backing vocals
- John Connolly – rhythm guitar, backing vocals
- Vinnie Hornsby – bass guitar
- Morgan Rose – drums, backing vocals

Production and design

- Sevendust – record producer
- Mike Ferretti – recording engineer, mixing engineer
- Kurt Wubbenhorst – keyboards and sound design
- Ted Jensen – mastering
- Jim Ansell – artwork, design

== Charts ==
Chart (2013)	Peak position
US Billboard 200	18
US Top Hard Rock Albums (Billboard)	1
US Independent Albums (Billboard)	4
US Top Rock Albums (Billboard)	5
US Indie Store Album Sales (Billboard)	8
