= MTV The Return of the Rock =

Compilation album by Various Artists
- Released: June 13, 2000
- Genres: Nu metal, alternative metal, industrial metal, rap metal
- Length: 65:51
- Label: Roadrunner

MTV The Return of the Rock is a compilation album released in 2000. It coincided with MTV's Return of the Rock tour.

It peaked at #42 on the Billboard charts.

== Track listing ==
No.	Title	Music	Length
1.	"Fuck That"	Kid Rock
2.	"Spit It Out"	Slipknot
3.	"Crash"	Methods of Mayhem
4.	"Make Me Bad (sickness in salvation remix)"	Korn
5.	"Southtown"	P.O.D.
6.	"Just Go"	Staind
7.	"From This Day"	Machine Head
8.	"Suite-Pee"	System of a Down
9.	"Brackish"	Kittie
10.	"Pardon Me"	Incubus
11.	"Not Living"	Coal Chamber
12.	"Stain"	Full Devil Jacket
13.	"S.O.M."	Static-X
14.	"Do it Again"	Boiler Room
15.	"Denial"	Sevendust
16.	"Infest"	Papa Roach
17.	"Blunt Force Trauma"	Liquid Gang
18.	"When Worlds Collide"	Powerman 5000
19.	"Everything Sucks (Andy Wallace Remix)"	Dope
