= Praise (Sevendust song) =

Single by Sevendust

from the album Animosity
- Released: 2001
- Genre: Nu metal
- Length: 3:38
- Label: TVT
- Composers: John Connolly; Vinnie Hornsby; Clint Lowery; Morgan Rose; Lajon Witherspoon
- Lyricists: Lajon Witherspoon; Morgan Rose; Clint Lowery
- Producer: Ben Grosse

Sevendust singles chronology
"Home" (2000)	"Praise" (2001)	"Live Again" (2001)

Music video
- "Praise" on YouTube

"Praise" is a song by the American rock band Sevendust. It was released as the first single from their third studio album, Animosity (2001). The song peaked on Billboard's Mainstream Rock and Modern Rock Tracks charts at No. 15 and No. 23, respectively. "Praise" also appears on the band's first compilation album, Best Of (Chapter One 1997–2004).

== Music video ==
The music video for "Praise", directed by Glen Bennett, was shot in Orlando, Florida.

== Charts ==
Chart (2001)	Peak position
US Alternative Airplay (Billboard)	23
US Mainstream Rock (Billboard)	15

== Release history ==
Year	Album	Label	Ref.
2001	Animosity	TVT Records	
2001	Animosity (bonus track)	Island Records	
2001	Animosity (China bonus tracks)	Dream On	
2001	Animosity (clean)	TVT Records	
2001	Animosity (clean bonus tracks)	Universal Distribution	
2001	CMJ New Music, Vol. 98	CMJ	
2001	Promo Only: Modern Rock Radio (October 2001)	Promo Only	
2002	Hip Hop & Hard	Universal Distribution	
2005	Best Of (Chapter One 1997–2004)	TVT Records	
2005	Best Of (Chapter One 1997–2004) (clean)	TVT Records	
2005	TVT: Best of Rock & Alternative	TVT Records	
