= Licking Cream =

Promotional single by Sevendust featuring Skin

from the album Home
- Released: 1999
- Studio: Long View Farm (North Brookfield, Massachusetts)
- Genre: Nu metal
- Length: 3:17
- Label: Dragnet; TVT; Epic
- Composers: John Connolly; Skin; Vinnie Hornsby; Clint Lowery; Morgan Rose; Lajon Witherspoon
- Lyricists: Skin; Lajon Witherspoon; Clint Lowery
- Producers: Toby Wright; Sevendust

Sevendust chronology
"Denial" (1999)	"Licking Cream" (1999)	"Waffle" (2000)

Music video
- "Licking Cream" on YouTube

"Licking Cream" is a song by the American rock band Sevendust. It was released as a promotional single from their second studio album, Home (1999). "Licking Cream" was the band's first song to be released as a single in Europe. It features additional vocals by Skin, lead singer of the English rock band Skunk Anansie.

== Music video ==
The music video for "Licking Cream" was directed by Ben Joe Dempsey. The video was made depicting the band playing in a dilapidated apartment building.

== Track listing ==
No.	Title	Length
1.	"Licking Cream" (album version)	3:17
2.	"Licking Cream" (radio version)	3:17
3.	"Bitch"	3:41
4.	"School's Out" (Alice Cooper cover)	3:33

== Release history ==
Year	Album	Label	Ref.
1999	Home	Dream On	
1999	Home (Japan)	Import	
2000	Crossing All Over, Vol. 11	BMG	
