= Alpha (Sevendust album) =

Studio album by Sevendust
- Released: March 6, 2007
- Studio: Tree Sound (Atlanta, Georgia)
- Genres: Alternative metal; nu metal
- Length: 51:43
- Labels: 7Bros.; Asylum
- Producers: John Connolly; Morgan Rose; Shawn Grove

Sevendust chronology
Best Of (Chapter One 1997–2004) (2005)	Alpha (2007)	Retrospective 2 (2007)

Singles from Alpha
- 1. "Driven" Released: February 13, 2007; 2. "Beg to Differ" Released: 2007

Alpha is the sixth studio album by the American rock band Sevendust, released on March 6, 2007. It is the band's second album featuring Sonny Mayo on rhythm guitar and the first with him as part of the writing process. Alpha is also the first album by the band to be released under the Warner-affiliated Asylum Records.

== Recording and production ==
The album was recorded at Tree Sound Studios in Atlanta, Georgia. The production team was a collaborative effort, with guitarist John Connolly, drummer Morgan Rose, and engineer Shawn Grove all taking on producer roles. Grove, who had previously worked with the band, was considered by vocalist Lajon Witherspoon to be like another member of Sevendust due to his understanding of their sound, melody, and harmony.

A significant shift in the recording process for Alpha was the band's decision to track the bass and guitar parts live along with the drum tracks. This was a departure from the more common practice of recording each instrument separately. Guitarist Sonny Mayo explained that this approach was chosen to capture a "real unified energy".

Alpha was the first album to feature Sonny Mayo in the writing process, though the primary songwriting partnership for the album was between Morgan Rose and John Connolly.

Morgan Rose recording vocals.

Their chemistry was enhanced by the fact that Connolly is a former drummer himself, which allowed for a unique dynamic in crafting the rhythmic foundation of the songs. Rose would often challenge himself to learn and perform complex drum machine beats that Connolly had written.

Connolly also made a deliberate decision to avoid programming on the album, wanting the album to be "raw and in your face" and to capture a vibe reminiscent of their earlier album, Animosity. He felt that while programming had its place for transitions and textures, it could sometimes detract from the aggressive edge of heavier music.

== Concept and themes ==
"Burn"
Sample of "Burn," praised by critics as a standout track for its layered composition and extended instrumentals, highlighting the band's experimental side.

Morgan Rose explained in an interview with Launch that the title Alpha refers to the internal conflict, and the struggle to determine which is stronger. He stated:

"I like the idea of the alpha concept, but that isn't why it's called Alpha. It's basically called Alpha because the record has a conceptual feel to it and it's the good and evil side of one's mind and which one is the stronger. But we are definitely looking at this as a new start in a bunch of different ways."

Rose also revealed that much of the album's lyrical content was influenced by personal struggles he experienced around the time of recording, including his divorce and both his and his father's drug-related arrests the year before.

== Label change ==
The band's previous label, WineDark Records, collapsed in 2006, leaving Sevendust without distribution or tour support and heavily in debt. This implosion was a major blow, with the band's financial situation becoming so dire they had to cancel a European tour in May 2006.

This turmoil, however, led to a fresh start. In December 2006, Sevendust announced a new partnership. Their own label, 7Bros. Records, signed a deal with Asylum Records, a subsidiary of Warner Music Group, making them the first rock act on the predominantly hip-hop and rap-focused label.

The new arrangement provided the band with a level of creative control they had been seeking. In a 2007 interview, Morgan Rose described the deal as "very interesting," explaining that it allowed them to funnel their work through Asylum while having the backing of the larger Warner Music Group. He noted that this gave them "strength behind you" and the integrity to write the songs they wanted to write, free from the creative pressures they had experienced previously.

== Artwork ==
The artwork for Alpha was directly inspired by a print titled "Hemorrhage" by artist Derek Hess, who is known for his work with bands like Pantera and Deftones. He created the original piece in 2005. It depicts a figure with blood streaming from its head, a powerful metaphor for an open wound that cannot heal due to a lack of closure. The image was adapted and illustrated for the album cover by Southern California artist Erik C. Casillas.

== Tour ==
Sonny Mayo and John Connolly performing live with Sevendust during the Alpha tour in 2007

Following the release of Alpha, Sevendust launched an extensive touring schedule throughout 2007 to support the record. The Alpha Tour saw the band headlining a significant 57-date tour across North America and performing at various festivals.

The touring cycle for Alpha began even before the album's official release. In late 2006, the band played a handful of shows with He Is Legend and Revelation Theory. The primary North American leg of the "Alpha Tour" kicked off in February 2007 and ran through April of that year. For this initial leg, Sevendust was supported by Bloodsimple and Diecast. Throughout 2007, Sevendust played over 100 shows.

The band's touring in support of Alpha also included appearances at several festivals, such as JJO Band Camp 2007 in Madison, Wisconsin, where they shared the bill with bands like Stone Sour, and Nonpoint. They also made appearances at Summerfest in Milwaukee, Wisconsin, and WJRR's Earthday Birthday 14 at Tinker Field in Orlando, Florida.

== Critical reception ==
Professional ratings
Review scores
Source	Rating
AllMusic	2/5 stars
Blabbermouth.net	7/10 stars
Entertainment Weekly	C+
IGN	7.9/10
MetalSucks	3/5 stars
PopMatters	6/10 stars
Ultimate Guitar	7.7/10

The album received generally positive to mixed reviews from music critics, with praise directed toward its heavier sound, consistent energy, and moments of experimentation, though several reviewers noted a lack of innovation compared to the band's earlier work. IGN awarded the album a 7.9 out of 10, commending its aggressive riffing, tight musicianship, and the confident performances from the band, while suggesting that it would primarily appeal to listeners already invested in Sevendust's established style. Ultimate Guitar described it as “a great record for those… who don’t expect Sevendust to ever change,” Blabbermouth rated the album 7 out of 10, highlighting its “crunching power chords,” “thumping rhythms,” and Lajon Witherspoon's commanding vocals. The review singled out "Deathstar" and "Clueless" as strong openers and praised the band’s willingness to stretch their songwriting on the nine-minute "Burn" and the thrash-influenced title track. However, it also remarked that much of the material shared similar tempos and structures, which could make the songs blur together over the course of the record.

Others were more reserved in their assessments. MetalSucks argued that Alpha showed little creative growth since guitarist Clint Lowery's departure, noting that while the record was heavier and more focused, several songs fell into predictable patterns. PopMatters, which gave the album a 6 out of 10, called "Burn" a standout for its ambition but described the rest of the album as offering "no new ideas" and being the least distinctive Sevendust release in a decade. AllMusic's Stephen Thomas Erlewine echoed the sentiment, stating that the band stuck to their "primal strengths" but delivered few memorable hooks to distinguish individual tracks.

== Track listing ==
All tracks are written by Sevendust.

No.	Title	Length
1.	"Deathstar"	3:38
2.	"Clueless"	3:49
3.	"Driven"	3:48
4.	"Feed"	3:37
5.	"Suffer"	3:50
6.	"Beg to Differ"	4:00
7.	"Under"	3:14
8.	"Story of Your Life"	4:09
9.	"Confessions of Hatred"	4:09
10.	"Aggression"	4:24
11.	"Burn"	9:02
12.	"Alpha"	3:45
Total length:		51:25

Target exclusive bonus track
No.	Title	Length
13.	"The Rim"	3:13

UK import bonus tracks
No.	Title	Length
13.	"The Rim"	3:13
14.	"Abuse Me"	3:30

== Personnel ==
Sevendust

- Lajon Witherspoon – lead vocals
- John Connolly – lead guitar, backing vocals
- Vinnie Hornsby – bass
- Morgan Rose – drums, backing vocals, co-lead vocals on "Burn"
- Sonny Mayo – rhythm guitar

Production

- John Connolly – producer, mixing
- Shawn Grove – producer, mixing
- Ted Jensen – mastering
- Joe Miller – executive producer
- Shilpa Patel – digital editing
- Morgan Rose – producer, mixing
- Fran Strine – photography, video
- Reagan Wexler – programming

== Charts ==
The album entered the US Billboard 200 at No. 14, selling about 42,000 copies in its first week.

Year	Chart	Position	Ref.
2007	Billboard 200	14	
2007	Top Rock Albums	6	
2007	Top Digital Albums	14	
2007	Top Internet Albums	14	
