= Blood & Stone =

Studio album by Sevendust
- Released: October 23, 2020
- Recorded: Late 2019 – early 2020
- Studio: Studio Barbarosa in Gotha, Florida
- Genre: Alternative metal; hard rock
- Length: 49:23
- Label: Rise
- Producer: Michael "Elvis" Baskette

Sevendust chronology
All I See Is War (2018)	Blood & Stone (2020)	Truth Killer (2023)

Singles from Blood & Stone
- 1. "The Day I Tried to Live" Released: June 26, 2020; 2. "Dying to Live" Released: October 20, 2020

Professional ratings
Review scores
Source	Rating
AllMusic	3/5 stars
Classic Rock	3.5/5 stars
Kerrang!	3/5 stars

Blood & Stone is the thirteenth studio album by the American rock band Sevendust. It was released on October 23, 2020. Two songs were showcased from the album ahead of its full release; the first single, a tribute to the late singer Chris Cornell of Soundgarden, "The Day I Tried to Live", along with one other promotional song and single, "Blood from a Stone".

== Writing and recording ==
The band starting writing and recording the album shortly after the "All I See Is War" tour in 2019. The band had chosen to work with music producer Michael "Elvis" Baskette on the album, which marks his second collaboration with the band.

== Themes and composition ==
The title track "Blood from a Stone" is about the endurance and threshold of the band, the wins and the losses, and the good years and bad years from the band. It was also described to be brooding and dark with surging rhythms, slightly off-key melodies, and very strong drumming by Morgan Rose.

== Track listing ==
All tracks are written by Sevendust, except "The Day I Tried to Live", written by Chris Cornell.

No.	Title	Length
1.	"Dying to Live"	3:09
2.	"Love"	3:58
3.	"Blood from a Stone"	3:22
4.	"Feel Like Going On"	4:21
5.	"What You've Become"	3:44
6.	"Kill Me"	3:38
7.	"Nothing Left to See Here Anymore"	3:30
8.	"Desperation"	3:33
9.	"Criminal"	4:16
10.	"Against the World"	4:01
11.	"Alone"	3:38
12.	"Wish You Well"	3:17
13.	"The Day I Tried to Live" (Soundgarden cover)	4:56
Total length:		49:23

Deluxe Edition bonus tracks
No.	Title	Length
14.	"Dying to Live (Jake Bowen Remix)"	4:08
15.	"Kill Me (Richard Wicander Remix)"	2:53
16.	"What You've Become (Justin deBlieck Remix)"	3:41
17.	"All I Really Know"	3:34
18.	"What You Are"	3:27
Total length:		60:06

== Personnel ==
=== Sevendust ===
- Lajon Witherspoon – lead vocals
- Clint Lowery – lead guitar, backing vocals, co-lead vocals on "Love" and “Blood from a Stone”
- John Connolly – rhythm guitar, backing vocals
- Vinnie Hornsby – bass, backing vocals
- Morgan Rose – drums, backing vocals

=== Production and design ===
- Michael "Elvis" Baskette – production, mixing
- Brad Blackwood − mastering
- Ryan Clark − designer
- Jeff Moll − digital editor, engineer
- Josh Saldate − assistant engineer
- Jeremiah Scott − photographer

== Charts ==
Chart performance of Blood & Stone
Chart (2020)	Peak position
Australian Albums (ARIA)	90
UK Album Downloads (OCC)	54
UK Independent Album Breakers (OCC)	19
UK Rock & Metal Albums (OCC)	27
US Billboard 200	55
US Top Hard Rock Albums (Billboard)	2
US Top Rock Albums (Billboard)	10
