= Next (Sevendust album) =

Studio album by Sevendust
- Released: October 11, 2005
- Recorded: 2005
- Studio: J. Stanley Productions Inc. (Orlando, Florida)
- Genres: Alternative metal, nu metal
- Length: 43:15
- Label: Winedark
- Producers: John Connolly; Morgan Rose; Shawn Grove; Sevendust (co.)

Sevendust chronology
Southside Double-Wide: Acoustic Live (2004)	Next (2005)	Best Of (Chapter One 1997–2004) (2005)

Singles from Next
- 1. "Ugly" Released: July 19, 2005; 2. "Failure" Released: 2006

Professional ratings
Review scores
Source	Rating
AllMusic	2.5/5 stars

Next is the fifth studio album by the American rock band Sevendust. It was released on October 11, 2005 through Winedark Records, with distribution by Universal Music. This album was their first release after departing from TVT Records and the introduction of guitarist Sonny Mayo, formerly of Snot and Amen, replacing Clint Lowery.

== Track listing ==
All tracks are written by Sevendust.

No.	Title	Length
1.	"Hero"	3:47
2.	"Ugly"	4:10
3.	"Pieces"	3:04
4.	"Silence"	3:59
5.	"This Life"	4:36
6.	"Failure"	3:45
7.	"See and Believe"	4:11
8.	"The Last Song"	3:52
9.	"Desertion"	3:20
10.	"Never"	4:03
11.	"Shadows in Red"	4:28
Total length:		43:15

== Personnel ==
Sevendust

- Lajon Witherspoon – lead vocals
- John Connolly – lead guitar, backing vocals
- Sonny Mayo – rhythm guitar
- Vinnie Hornsby – bass
- Morgan Rose – drums, backing vocals

Production

- John Connolly – producer, mixing
- Eddie Gowan – executive producer
- Shawn Grove – producer, engineer, mixing
- Joe Miller – executive producer
- Shilpa Patel – digital editing
- Morgan Rose – producer, mixing
- Eddy Schreyer – mastering
- Sevendust – co-producer
- Viggy Vignola – programming and drum technician

== Charts ==
Chart performance for Next
Chart (2005)	Peak position
Australian Albums (ARIA)	60
US Billboard 200	20
