= Denial (Sevendust song) =

Promotional single by Sevendust

from the album Home
- Released: 1999
- Studio: Long View Farm (North Brookfield, Massachusetts)
- Genre: Nu metal; post-grunge
- Length: 4:17
- Label: TVT
- Composers: John Connolly; Vinnie Hornsby; Clint Lowery; Morgan Rose; Lajon Witherspoon
- Lyricists: Clint Lowery; Morgan Rose
- Producers: Toby Wright; Sevendust

Sevendust singles chronology
"Too Close to Hate" (1998)	"Denial" (1999)	"Licking Cream" (1999)

Music video
- "Denial" on YouTube

"Denial" is a song by the American rock band Sevendust. It was released as a promotional single from the band's second studio album, Home (1999).

== Track listing ==
=== CD single 1 ===
No.	Title	Length
1.	"Denial" (radio edit)	3:44
2.	"Denial" (callout hook)	0:12

=== CD single 2 ===
No.	Title	Length
1.	"Denial"	4:17
2.	"Bender" (feat. Chino Moreno and Troy McLawhorn)	3:45

== Chart performance ==
The song peaked at No. 14 on Billboard's Mainstream Rock chart and at No. 26 on the Modern Rock Tracks chart.

== Release history ==
Year	Album	Label	Ref.
1999	CMJ New Music, Vol. 73	College Media	
1999	Crossing All Over, Vol. 10	BMG	
1999	Home	Dream On	
1999	Home (Japan)	Import	
2000	Free Air, Vol. 2	Never Records Group	
2000	MTV The Return of the Rock	Roadrunner	
2000	MTV The Return of the Rock (clean)	Roadrunner	
2000	Rebirth of the Loud	Priority	
2000	Rebirth of the Loud (clean)	Priority	
2001	Animosity (China, bonus tracks)	Dream On	
2005	Best Of (Chapter One 1997–2004)	TVT Records	
2005	Best Of (Chapter One 1997–2004) (clean)	TVT Records	
2006	Sons of Metal	Time; Life Music	
