= Angel's Son =

2000 single by Snot feat. Lajon Witherspoon, Clint Lowery and Morgan Rose

Single by Snot featuring Lajon Witherspoon, Clint Lowery and Morgan Rose

from the album Strait Up
- Recorded: 2000
- Genre: Acoustic rock
- Length: 3:49
- Label: Immortal
- Songwriters: Mikey Dolan; Clint Lowery; Morgan Rose; Lajon Witherspoon

Music video
- "Angel's Son" on YouTube

"Angel's Son"

Single by Sevendust

from the album Animosity
- Released: May 2002
- Genre: Post-grunge
- Length: 3:49
- Label: TVT
- Songwriters: Clint Lowery; Lajon Witherspoon

Sevendust singles chronology
"Live Again" (2002)	"Angel's Son" (2002)	"Crucified" (2002)

Music video
- "Angel's Son" on YouTube

"Angel's Son" is a song written by Clint Lowery and Lajon Witherspoon of Sevendust and performed by Witherspoon, fellow Sevendust members (drummer Morgan Rose and guitarist/vocalist Clint Lowery) and ex-Snot band member (now ex-Sevendust guitarist) Sonny Mayo, for the post-mortem compilation CD in honor of Snot founding vocalist James Lynn Strait known as Strait Up.

The Snot version of the song, credited to "Strait Up featuring Lajon", peaked at number 15 on the Billboard Modern Rock Tracks chart and number 11 on the Billboard Mainstream Rock Tracks chart. Sevendust recorded a studio version of the song for their 2001 album, Animosity.

== Music video ==
=== Strait Up ===
The Strait Up version features the band with ex-Snot bandmates playing on a beach around a camp fire. Footage of James Lynn Strait who died with his dog Dobbs in a car accident, is superimposed during a vigil around the campfire, growing in attendance with appearances of fellow musicians and friends including members of System of a Down, Coal Chamber, Sugar Ray, Kittie, Incubus, Korn and others to say goodbye as a memorium title is revealed at the last moments of the song. Strait's mother is also featured in the video.

=== Animosity ===
The video opens with a man walking through a hospital waiting room, wearing an 'In Memory of Lynn Strait' t-shirt. Another man is shown in critical condition as the ER staff works to keep him alive. Towards the end of the video, the man expires, just as a woman rushes to check on him. As the doctor approaches with this news, he looks down to a photograph from the victim that shows the woman standing with him, revealing that she is the deceased's mother. Shots of the band playing the song in different parts of the hospital are interspliced.

Drummer Morgan Rose commented about the video, "I'm not really into videos where people are playing on fields or hospitals or places where there's no chance in hell that you'd see them play, but this actually turned out great." The video features all of the members of the band: lead vocalist, Lajon Witherspoon; guitarist, Clint Lowery; guitarist, John Connolly; drummer, Morgan Rose and bassist, Vinnie Hornsby.
