= Enemy (Sevendust song) =

Single by Sevendust

from the album Seasons
- Released: August 12, 2003
- Studio: Ruby Red (Atlanta, Georgia)
- Length: 3:03
- Label: TVT
- Composers: John Connolly; Vinnie Hornsby; Clint Lowery; Morgan Rose; Lajon Witherspoon
- Lyricists: Morgan Rose; Butch Walker
- Producer: Butch Walker

Sevendust singles chronology
"Xmas Day" (2002)	"Enemy" (2003)	"Broken Down" (2004)

Music video
- "Enemy" on YouTube

"Enemy" is a song by the American rock band Sevendust. It was released on August 12, 2003, as the lead single from their fourth studio album, Seasons (2003). The song peaked at No. 10 on Billboard's Mainstream Rock chart, their first song to reach the top 10, and peaked at No. 30 on the Modern Rock Tracks chart, their last song to crack that chart to date.

== Background and meaning ==
"Enemy" was written and largely sung by drummer Morgan Rose, who was then married to bass guitarist Rayna Foss-Rose of Coal Chamber. According to Rose, the song is a diatribe directed toward Coal Chamber's frontman Dez Fafara. "Enemy" was originally called "Pez," a derogatory nickname Rose had for Fafara. Regarding the nickname itself, Rose explained: "We called him that because I used to say, 'I want to take this dude's head and pull it back and rip his tongue out of his neck.'"

"That song is about the person in the world that I hate more than Saddam Hussein", Rose said. "It was good to be able to get that stuff off my chest because I was able to express myself without doing anything stupid that would get me in trouble." Rose held such rancor for Fafara because of the way he allegedly treated Foss-Rose during her time in Coal Chamber. But Rose also stated his anger "turned out to be a really good song." Sevendust guitarist John Connolly also expressed strong dislike for Fafara.

== Music video ==
The music video for "Enemy" was directed by Adam Pollina, a former artist for the Marvel comic book X-Force, and features former WWE wrestler Chyna. It includes no band performance and solely depicts a violent yet comical plot. The video begins with a tall man named Romp and his accompanying dwarf manager, Chi Chi Gigante, who carries his championship belt, an Attitude Era WWE Championship. As they walk down a sidewalk busy with food vendors and breakdancers, they meet a muscular blond woman, named Lu Lu (Chyna), beating on a defenseless man in an alley. The two silently challenge Lu Lu to a fight before Chi Chi removes Romp's jacket to reveal he has no arms. Romp and Lu Lu face each other in a violent, bloody bout ending with a victorious Romp. The duo walk away with a caption reading "...to be continued." Artwork of the Sevendust band lineup, as seen on the Seasons album cover, is shown as the video comes to an end.

== Charts ==
Chart (2003)	Peak position
US Mainstream Rock (Billboard)	10
US Alternative Airplay (Billboard)	30
