= Unraveling (song) =

Single by Sevendust

from the album Cold Day Memory
- Released: February 22, 2010
- Studio: Groovemaster (Chicago, Illinois)
- Length: 3:59
- Label: Asylum
- Songwriters: John Connolly; Vinnie Hornsby; Clint Lowery; Corey Lowery; Morgan Rose; Lajon Witherspoon; Dave Bassett
- Producer: Johnny K

Sevendust singles chronology
"The Past" (2008)	"Unraveling" (2010)	"Forever" (2010)

Music video
- "Unraveling" on YouTube

"Unraveling" is a song by American rock band Sevendust. It was released as the lead single from their eighth studio album, Cold Day Memory (2010). "Unraveling" was the highest charting single of the band's career up to that point, peaking at No. 7 and No. 29 on Billboard's Mainstream Rock and Rock Songs charts, respectively; however, in 2023, the band's single "Everything" surpassed it, peaking at No. 6 and No. 27 on the same respective charts.

== Music video ==
The music video for the song premiered April 20, 2010 on MTV2 and MTV2.com. Directed by Rafa Alcantara, the video showcases live performances combined with footage from the DVD.

== Charts ==
Chart (2010)	Peak position
US Mainstream Rock Songs (Billboard)	7
US Rock Songs (Billboard)	29
