= Cold Day Memory =

Studio album by Sevendust
- Released: April 20, 2010
- Studio: Groovemaster (Chicago, Illinois)
- Genre: Alternative metal
- Length: 46:30
- Label: 7Bros.; Asylum
- Producer: Johnny K; Sevendust (co.); Corey Lowery (co.)

Sevendust chronology
Chapter VII: Hope & Sorrow (2008)	Cold Day Memory (2010)	Black Out the Sun (2013)

Singles from Cold Day Memory
- 1. "Unraveling" Released: February 22, 2010; 2. "Forever" Released: July 26, 2010; 3. "Last Breath" Released: January 24, 2011

Cold Day Memory is the eighth studio album by American rock band Sevendust, released on April 20, 2010. The album marks the return of guitarist Clint Lowery, who previously left Sevendust in 2004 to work with Dark New Day. The album debuted at No. 12 on the Billboard 200 chart, selling around 27,000 copies in the United States in its first week of release, marking the band's highest debut ever.

== Recording and production ==
The album was recorded at Groovemaster Studios in Chicago, Illinois with producer Johnny K. Clint Lowery's brother, Corey Lowery, who had previously worked with Clint Lowery in the band Dark New Day, also aided the band in their recording process.

On January 20, 2010, drummer Morgan Rose revealed that the album title was Cold Day Memory.

Guitarist Clint Lowery, who rejoined Sevendust in March 2008, commented: "This record personally has been one of the most difficult, but most rewarding records I've ever worked on. I put a lot of pressure on myself to contribute good material to the guys after being gone for last three records and that helped me focus more than I ever had." Lajon Witherspoon added: "I feel this album shows new growth for the band. We're very happy to have Clint back and are looking forward for everyone hearing the magic that's made when we're all together!"

=== Lyrical themes ===
Rose described the writing process for the album as "a more personal experience to him", and said that due to the events that transpired in the prior year, he would sometimes have trouble coming up with words, and would often write gibberish as a temporary filler. While Rose would be the primary writer, all five members of the band would contribute. Rose focused on more distressing themes, while Witherspoon, who had just become a father, focused his lyrics on responsibility and commitment. The album's first single, "Unraveling", was co-written by Lowery and is about the collapse of a relationship, while "Confession" indirectly addresses Lowery quitting and returning to the band. On Lowery's return, Rose spoke: "Since we all write, it's hard to tell exactly what each song is about, but we like to leave it up to the listeners to decide for themselves". Rose says: "It's funny because in the end you almost don't know what you wrote. I remember telling John one time, 'Dude, that was an amazing line you wrote,' and he went, 'What are you talking about? You wrote that.' We wanted to change the template completely from what we did with our last album, 'Hope And Sorrow'. We were going, 'Let's bring back those other elements Clint brought in that made us what we were.' So we sort of made a silent agreement that we were going to let Clint run wild. We said we'll jump in when it's time, but if you've got an idea let's go with it."

== Reception ==
Professional ratings
Review scores
Source	Rating
411mania	8.5/10 stars
AllMusic	2.5/5 stars
Live-Metal	8.5/10 stars
Metalunderground	4.5/5 stars
PopMatters	8/10 stars
Sputnikmusic	3/5 stars
TuneLab Music	9/10 stars

Reception to Cold Day Memory was quite positive. 411mania.com stated "What you'll find here is the best Sevendust album since Seasons in terms of lyrics, emotion, guitarwork and drums." ultimate-guitar.com stated "At times the band broaches the industrial genre, but those moments are extremely fleeting. In both "Splinter" and "Forever Dead", the intros feature computer-like effects that could easily have led into NIN territory." Chris Colgan of PopMatters focused on the significance of Clint Lowery's return to the band, saying that "...the reunion with Lowery immediately proves to be a huge step forward for the veteran quintet." Colgan goes on to say that the album "...has the energy and vitality of the band's older work, but it also has exponentially greater musicianship and subtlety, the kind that only a veteran band can achieve."

The album did receive some level of criticism, though. thenewreview.net stated "With songs like 'Ride Insane' 'Here and Now' and 'Nowhere', I became a little bored. I felt as if I were listening to songs I had already heard before by the band, or perhaps even elsewhere, and wasn't completely blown away by what was there." Guitarinternational.com stated "Cold Day Memory is a killer release, and one that should act to propel the band into the new decade with a renewed sense of confidence, hopefully forgetting, at least somewhat, the events that haunted them for the majority of the past decade. If this record is any indication of things to come, then we could be hearing great things from a band that has more than paid their dues, and come screaming back onto the scene, leaving no doubt that they deserve to be included next to the biggest names in Metal today."

== Track listing ==
All tracks are written by Sevendust, except "Unraveling" and "Confessions (Without Faith)", co-written with Dave Bassett.

No.	Title	Length
1.	"Splinter"	3:54
2.	"Forever"	3:26
3.	"Unraveling"	3:58
4.	"Last Breath"	3:48
5.	"Karma"	3:52
6.	"Ride Insane"	3:15
7.	"Confessions (Without Faith)"	4:06
8.	"Nowhere"	3:29
9.	"Here and Now"	4:07
10.	"The End Is Coming"	4:34
11.	"Better Place"	4:21
12.	"Strong Arm Broken"	3:39
Total length:		46:30

== Personnel ==
Sevendust

- Lajon Witherspoon – lead vocals
- Clint Lowery – lead guitar, backing vocals
- John Connolly – rhythm guitar, backing vocals
- Vinnie Hornsby – bass
- Morgan Rose – drums, backing vocals

Production

- Johnny K – producer, mixing
- Corey Lowery – co-producer
- Justin Walden – programming
- Ted Jensen – mastering

== Charts ==
Year	Chart	Position	Ref.
2010	The Billboard 200	12	
2010	Rock Albums	4	
2010	Digital Albums	6	
2010	Alternative Albums	2	
2010	Hard Rock Albums	3	
