= Black (Sevendust song) =

1997 promotional single by Sevendust

Promotional single by Sevendust

from the album Sevendust
- Released: 1997
- Studio: Triclops (Atlanta, Georgia)
- Genre: Nu metal; hard rock
- Length: 4:08
- Label: TVT
- Songwriters: John Connolly; Vinnie Hornsby; Clint Lowery; Morgan Rose; Lajon Witherspoon
- Producers: Mark Mendoza; Jay Jay French

Sevendust singles chronology
"Black" (1997)	"Breathe" (1998)

"Black" is a song by the American rock band Sevendust. It was released as a promotional single from their self-titled debut album. The song was included on the band's first compilation album, Best Of (Chapter One 1997–2004). Live acoustic versions of the song were also included on the Seasons limited edition DVD and on the band's first live album, Southside Double-Wide: Acoustic Live (2004). The band's signature song, "Black" peaked at No. 30 on Billboard's Mainstream Rock chart.

== Recording ==
Sevendust tried to pull "Black" off of the band's self-titled debut album before recording the song. Guitarist John Connolly said:

It was one of the first songs that we had done together as a band. By the time we got a record deal, we had probably played it 500-600 times and we were just kinda tired of it. It was the last song we played for our label and the producers and they all just laughed and [said], "You guys are funny, man. That's the best song of the bunch." And we were like, "No, it's not." And they're like, "Yes, it is – watch! This song will stick around for a long time." And you know what? They were right! (laughs)

== Meaning ==
Drummer Morgan Rose said that "Black" is "one of those things where it's not strictly about racism, but it takes a little tap on it". Rose continued, saying:

[Lajon] states it pretty clearly: if people would mind their own business, the world would be a better place. Everyone's trying to stick their nose in everybody's business, instead of worrying about themselves.

== Reception ==
"Black" has been described as the band's signature song. The song peaked at No. 30 on Billboard's Mainstream Rock chart.

In 2017, Annie Zaleski of Spin named "Black" the 21st-best nu metal song of all time.

== Track listing ==
No.	Title	Length
1.	"Black" (radio version)	4:10

== Charts ==
Chart (1997)	Peak position
US Mainstream Rock (Billboard)	30

== Appearances in other media ==
The song was included on the soundtrack of the American film Swimfan (2002).

== Release history ==
Year	Album	Label	Ref.
1997	Got TVT	TVT Records	
1997	Sevendust	TVT Records	
1997	Sevendust (China)	Import	
1999	Home (Japan)	Import	
1999	Live and Loud	TVT Records	
1999	The Hard + the Heavy, Vol. 1	Rhino	
2001	Animosity (clean, bonus track)	Universal Distribution	
2002	Swimf@n	TVT Records	
2004	Southside Double-Wide: Acoustic Live	TVT Records	
2005	Best Of (Chapter One 1997–2004)	TVT Records	
2005	Best Of (Chapter One 1997–2004) (clean)	TVT Records	

== Acoustic version ==
"Black (acoustic)"

Single by Sevendust

from the album Time Travelers & Bonfires
- Released: March 25, 2014
- Studio: Architekt Music (Butler, New Jersey)
- Genre: Acoustic rock
- Length: 4:32
- Label: 7Bros.
- Songwriters: John Connolly; Vinnie Hornsby; Clint Lowery; Morgan Rose; Lajon Witherspoon
- Producers: Clint Lowery; Morgan Rose

Sevendust singles chronology
"Picture Perfect" (2013)	"Black (acoustic)" (2014)	"Thank You" (2015)

The acoustic version of "Black" was recorded by Sevendust and was released to rock radio stations on March 25, 2014. The song was included on Sevendust's first official acoustic album, Time Travelers & Bonfires, which was released by the band's 7Bros. Records label in conjunction with ADA Label Services on April 15, 2014. It was ultimately the only single released for Time Travelers & Bonfires.

=== Track listing ===
No.	Title	Length
1.	"Black" (acoustic version)	4:32

=== Charts ===
Chart (2014)	Peak position
US Mainstream Rock (Billboard)	23
