= Live and Loud (Sevendust album) =

Video by Sevendust
- Released: September 16, 1998
- Venue: Metro Chicago
- Genre: Alternative metal; nu metal; hard rock
- Length: 30:00
- Label: TVT
- Director: Mark Haefali

Sevendust chronology
Live and Loud (1998)	Retrospect (2001)

Professional ratings
Review scores
Source	Rating
Allmusic	3/5 stars

Live and Loud is the first video album by American rock band Sevendust, shot at Metro Chicago on September 16, 1998. It was directed by Mark Haefali.

== Track listing ==
1. "Black"
2. "Speak"
3. "Too Close to Hate"
4. "Bitch"
5. "Prayer"
6. "Terminator"
