= Seasons (Sevendust album) =

Studio album by Sevendust
- Released: October 7, 2003
- Studios: Ruby Red (Atlanta); Brannon (Atlanta)
- Genres: Nu metal; alternative metal
- Length: 43:54
- Label: TVT
- Producers: Butch Walker; Sevendust (co.)

Sevendust chronology
Animosity (2001)	Seasons (2003)	Southside Double-Wide: Acoustic Live (2004)

Singles from Seasons
- 1. "Enemy" Released: August 12, 2003; 2. "Broken Down" Released: 2004; 3. "Face to Face" Released: 2004

Seasons is the fourth studio album by the American rock band Sevendust. It would be the band's final album with TVT Records and was dedicated to the memory to both Dave Williams (Drowning Pool's original singer), who died of cardiomyopathy in August 2002, and Reginald Witherspoon (Lajon Witherspoon's younger brother), who was murdered in November 2002.

Seasons was, for a time, the band's last album with Clint Lowery as he left in 2004. Lowery would return to Sevendust in March 2008.

A limited edition of Seasons was released. It includes a DVD featuring "Black" (live and acoustic) and other special features.

== Recording and production ==
In an unusual choice, Butch Walker was chosen to produce the band's fourth album. Although Walker had produced some demos for the band in their early years as Crawlspace, he had a largely pop-oriented résumé. In a 2003 interview, guitarist John Connolly described the album's overall approach:

"It's really heavy and just tons of melody. We're real big fans of melody and there's no reason that a heavy band can't have something to sing over, and we just really pushed it a lot farther than we had a chance to on the last few records."

Connolly also compared Seasons to the band's previous albums:

"A lot more mature. A lot more focused. We just had a lot more time to spend with it. Working with Butch Walker in the studio just made us a lot more efficient, and we could move a lot faster. We wrote a lot of songs for this record. I think we just pushed better songs further along then we had a chance to with Animosity."

In retrospect, Morgan Rose has described Seasons as too commercial. This was due to Sevendust's loss of creative control with TVT Records thinking that Seasons should be suitable for radio airplay. He noted in an interview, "When we finished our touring cycle for Seasons, and our number one priority was to figure out a way to get out of the record deal that we had been stuck in for quite a while. Once we finally got out, our next priority was not to be stuck in the same position as far as creative control and to be able to make a lot of the musical decisions on our own."

== Reception ==
Professional ratings
Review scores
Source	Rating
AllMusic	4/5 stars
Exclaim!	(positive)
Star Pulse	4/5 stars

=== Commercial performance ===
Seasons gained substantial commercial success. It debuted at No. 14 in the US, selling nearly 68,000 copies in its first week. The album's lead single, "Enemy" reached No. 10 on Billboard's Mainstream Rock chart to become the group's highest charting single up to that point (it was matched by 2007's "Driven" at No. 10 and then surpassed by 2010's "Unraveling" at No. 7). The following two promotional singles did not achieve such a high standard but nevertheless gained frequent airplay upon release. Despite mostly positive reviews, the album failed to sell as well as its predecessors, which all were certified gold.

=== Critical reception ===
The album gained overall positive reception from critics. Its approach to heaviness and melody were commended as was the band for their continued strength in songwriting. However, Seasons provided little diversity from previous albums. Amber Authier of Exclaim! noted, "...as these Atlanta, Georgia natives release more discs, they start to blend into each other. They take small steps into a new direction but they aren't willing to take a leap of faith into something radically outside of the style that has given them success to date." AllMusic's Alex Henderson described the album as "far from a happy CD, but it's a compelling one -- perhaps too dark for some listeners, but compelling nonetheless" and added, "Sevendust continues to live up to its high standards throughout the band's fourth album."

== Touring and promotion ==
Building up to the release of Seasons, the band performed lengthy acoustic sets in various cities and had listening parties for the new album. Their performance at the Georgia Theatre would be released as the band's first live album, Southside Double-Wide: Acoustic Live, in May 2004. Following the acoustic shows, Sevendust opened for Staind. They also joined Cold for a US tour in the spring of 2004.

The album's first promotional single, "Enemy", had a music video which was shown frequently on Headbangers Ball in late 2003. It features former professional wrestler Chyna in a comical yet violent street brawl against an armless man. Two more promotional singles were released and gained substantial airplay. The track "Separate" was also included on the MTV2 Headbangers Ball compilation in 2003.

== Track listing ==
Credits adapted from the album's liner notes.

No.	Title	Writer(s)	Length
1.	"Disease"	Clint Lowery, Morgan Rose, Lajon Witherspoon	3:33
2.	"Enemy"	Rose, Butch Walker	3:03
3.	"Seasons"	Lowery, John Connolly, Walker	3:32
4.	"Broken Down"	Connolly, Rose	3:23
5.	"Separate"	Lowery, Rose, Walker	3:41
6.	"Honesty"	Connolly, Rose, Walker, Lowery	3:30
7.	"Skeleton Song"	Lowery, Rose	4:22
8.	"Disgrace"	Lowery, Connolly, Rose	3:58
9.	"Burned Out"	Lowery	3:52
10.	"Suffocate"	Lowery, Rose	3:22
11.	"Gone"	Lowery, Rose	3:43
12.	"Face to Face"	Lowery, Connolly, Rose	3:55
Total length:			43:54

Bonus track release
No.	Title	Writer(s)	Length
13.	"Coward"	Rose, Walker	3:36

Bonus tracks release
No.	Title	Writer(s)	Length
13.	"Rain"	Lowery, Rose	3:35
14.	"Coward"	Rose, Walker	3:36

Japanese release
No.	Title	Writer(s)	Length
13.	"Rain"	Lowery, Rose	3:35
14.	"Number One (The Ballad)"	Lowery, Rose	4:47
15.	"Coward"	Rose, Walker	3:34

== B-sides ==
- "Inner City Blues" (Marvin Gaye cover, bonus DVD audio track included with Seasons)

== Personnel ==
Sevendust

- Lajon Witherspoon – lead vocals
- Clint Lowery – lead guitar, backing vocals, co-lead vocals on "Skeleton Song"
- John Connolly – rhythm guitar, backing vocals
- Vinnie Hornsby – bass
- Morgan Rose – drums, backing vocals

Production

- Produced and recorded by Butch Walker, co-produced by Sevendust
- Assisted by Rusty Cobb and Shawn Grove
- Recorded at Ruby Red Studios and Brannon Studios, Atlanta, Georgia
- Mixed by Jay Baumgardner at NRG Studios, Hollywood, California
- Programming by William Vignola
- Drum tech: Mickey Wade / Guitar tech: Brent Mullins
- Mastered by Tom Baker at Precision Mastering
- Executive producers: Jeff Hanson, Steve Gottlieb, and Jay Jay French

== Charts ==
=== Album ===
Chart performance for Seasons
Chart (2003)	Peak position
Australian Albums (ARIA)	38
New Zealand Albums (RMNZ)	20
US Billboard 200	14

=== Singles ===
Year	Song	Chart	Position	Ref.
2003	"Enemy"	Mainstream Rock	10	
2003	"Enemy"	Alternative Airplay	30	
2004	"Broken Down"	Mainstream Rock	20	
2004	"Face to Face"	Mainstream Rock	22	
