= Sevendust =

American rock band

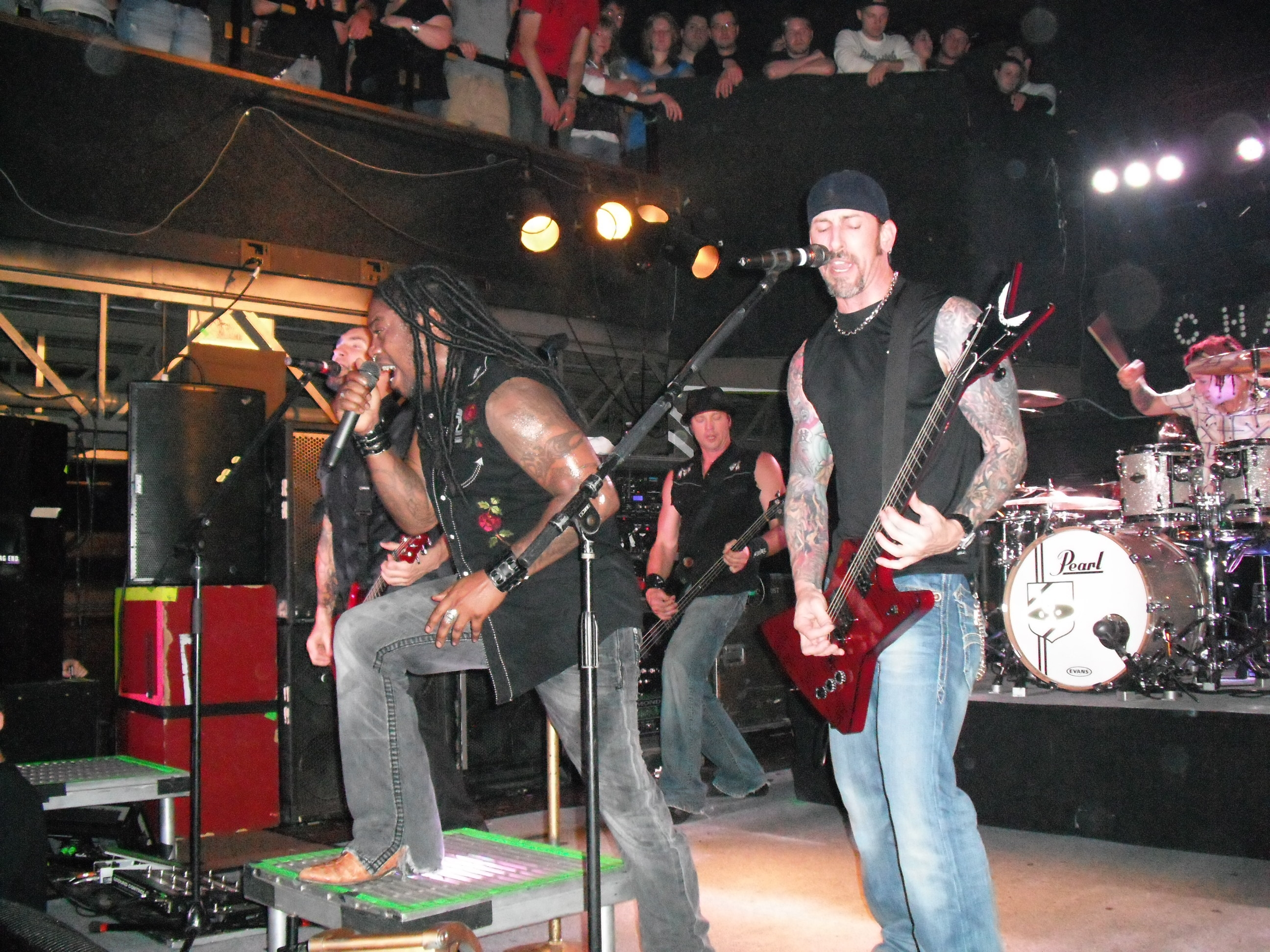
- Sevendust performing at The Chameleon Club in 2010

Background information
- Also known as: Snake Nation (1994); Rumblefish (1994); Crawlspace (1994–1995)
- Origin: Atlanta, Georgia, U.S.
- Genres: Alternative metal; nu metal; hard rock
- Works: Sevendust discography
- Years active: 1994–present
- Labels: TVT; Roadrunner; Asylum; Winedark; 7 Bros.; Rise; Napalm
- Members: Vinnie Hornsby; Morgan Rose; John Connolly; Lajon Witherspoon; Clint Lowery
- Past members: Sonny Mayo; Lee Banks
- Website: sevendust.com

Sevendust is an American rock band from Atlanta, Georgia, formed in 1994 by bassist Vinnie Hornsby, drummer Morgan Rose, and guitarist John Connolly. After their first demo, lead vocalist Lajon Witherspoon and guitarist Clint Lowery joined the group. Following a few name changes, the members settled on Sevendust and released their self-titled debut album in 1997, which sold only 311 copies in its first week but ultimately achieved gold certification.

Since their formation, Sevendust have attained success with three consecutive RIAA gold-certified albums, a Grammy nomination, and have sold millions of records worldwide. The group has released a total of 15 studio albums.

== History ==
=== Early years and Sevendust (1994–1998) ===
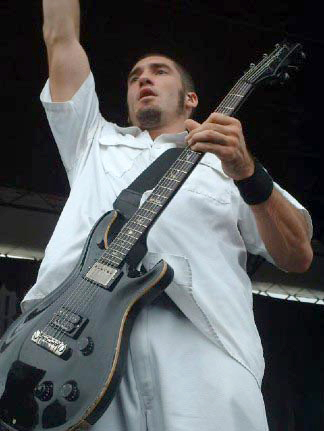
Guitarist Clint Lowery, photographed in 1998, is one of Sevendust's primary songwriters.

In 1994, bassist Vinnie Hornsby joined drummer Morgan Rose in a band called Snake Nation. Drummer John Connolly then joined the group as guitarist. They recorded one early demo, but were displeased with the lead vocals and thus they hired Lajon Witherspoon following a yearlong search. Around the same time, guitarist Lee Banks joined to complete the lineup, and the band renamed themselves Rumblefish. Rumblefish renamed themselves again after discovering another band with the same name. They chose Crawlspace, but shortly after, Banks became dissatisfied with the touring schedule. The band replaced him with Clint Lowery. Their first commercialized appearance was the song "My Ruin" on the 1996 compilation album Mortal Kombat: More Kombat through TVT Records. The band changed their name for the third and final time after another group named Crawlspace sent notice they wanted $2,500 in exchange for the naming rights. The band renamed themselves Sevendust, inspired by the commercial insecticide "Sevin", after Hornsby found a can of Sevin's powder variant in his grandmother's garage.

Sevendust released their self-titled debut album, with production by Twisted Sister members guitarist Jay Jay French and bassist Mark Mendoza, on April 15, 1997. The singles "Black" and "Bitch" both peaked at No. 30 on the Mainstream Rock Tracks chart. "Black" notably became the opening song for nearly every Sevendust concert until 2004. Sevendust appeared on the Billboard 200, remained there for sixteen weeks, and peaked at No. 165 on April 4, 1998. The album went gold on May 19, 1999.

In 1998, Sevendust performed at Dynamo Open Air (May 29–31) and Ozzfest 1998 (July through August). In the same year, they released the compilation Live and Loud, which featured live footage of the band's performance of September 16, 1998, at Metro Chicago.

=== Home and Animosity (1999–2002) ===
In July 1999, Sevendust played on the last day at the infamous Woodstock '99 concert in Rome, New York. Rose recalled that they were escorted by numerous security guards to the stage for their set as attendees grew violent. On August 24, 1999, Sevendust released their second album Home, which peaked at No. 19 on the Billboard 200. Two singles were released from the album, "Denial" and "Waffle", the latter of which was played on Late Night with Conan O'Brien. That year, the band gained European exposure by opening various shows in Germany for Skunk Anansie, whose vocalist Skin provided guest vocals on the track "Licking Cream" off Home. Sevendust also opened for Metallica, with Kid Rock and Ted Nugent, on New Year's Eve in 1999 at the Pontiac Silverdome near Detroit, Michigan. In 2000, the band joined Slipknot, Slayer, Sepultura, Coal Chamber, and others on the Tattoo the Earth tour.

In November 2001, Sevendust released their third album Animosity, which went gold due to the success of the singles "Praise" and "Angel's Son", which peaked at No. 15 and No. 11 respectively on the Mainstream Rock Tracks chart. "Angel's Son" was a tribute to Lynn Strait, lead singer of Snot, whom the members of Sevendust were friends with. Strait died in a car accident in 1998. In addition to being re-recorded for Animosity, the song originally appeared on the compilation album Strait Up. The band made an appearance on Late Show with David Letterman playing an acoustic version of "Angel's Son" featuring Paul Shaffer on keyboards.

Tragedy struck again when Witherspoon's younger brother was shot and killed later that year. Due to his death, Sevendust went on hiatus in 2002.

=== Seasons, Lowery's departure, and Next (2003–2005) ===
In 2003, Sevendust returned with their fourth album Seasons. Featuring their highest-charting single at that point, "Enemy", which peaked at No. 10 on the Mainstream Rock Tracks chart, the album debuted at No. 14 in the US, selling around 68,000 copies in its first week. "Enemy" was also the official theme song for WWE Unforgiven 2003. In 2004, for the first time in the band's career, they released a live album on a CD/DVD double disk package titled Southside Double-Wide: Acoustic Live. This concert showcased a mellower side to the band with their acoustic performance.

On December 11, 2004, after a show in Columbus, Ohio, it was announced Lowery had left the band mid-tour, because he wanted to play with his brother Corey in his new band Dark New Day, who had reportedly just signed with Warner Bros. Records. A temporary guitarist was found for the rest of the dates, and Lowery was ultimately replaced with Sonny Mayo of Snot and Amen. At roughly the same time, Sevendust and TVT Records parted ways.

On October 11, 2005, Sevendust joined producer/engineer Shawn Grove and released their fifth studio album Next on the WineDark Records label, distributed by Universal Music. In the process, Sevendust created their own record label, 7Bros Records. The album was recorded in a private house-turned-studio owned by a couple outside the band's hometown of Atlanta, Georgia. The first radio single off Next was "Ugly", released to radio August 9, 2005, followed by the music video. "Pieces" appeared on the soundtrack for the film Saw II. Next debuted at No. 20 in the US, selling around 37,000 copies in its first week. After the release of Next, Sevendust's former label TVT Records released a greatest hits package for Sevendust, titled Best of (Chapter One 1997–2004), the label's final Sevendust release.

A few months after the October 2005 release date of Next, the band was at odds with WineDark. "I had people come up to me and say, 'When is the record coming out?'. And it had already been out for five months", Rose stated. "Basically, the main person that was in charge of the whole thing fell off the face of the earth. There were no more cheques coming in, and the money had not been paid in full."

=== Alpha, Chapter VII: Hope & Sorrow, and Lowery's return (2006–2008) ===
In early 2006, the band was considered bankrupt. WineDark imploded, leaving Sevendust without distribution, tour support, or promised advance payments. The band owed money to crew members and other staffers and had a mounting credit card debt. In April, they expected a tax refund from the US government in order to help ease the burden. Afterwards, they found out their accountant had not paid their taxes and thus they owed $120,000 to the government. "We were beyond broke", said Rose. "We had a debt load close to a million dollars, and we were in a position where, no matter how much money we thought we were making, we were still having to pay and pay."

Sevendust, with Shawn Grove as producer/engineer once again, released their sixth studio album Alpha on March 6, 2007 via Warner-affiliated Asylum Records. It debuted at No. 14 in the US, the band's highest chart position at that point, and went on to sell over 42,000 copies in its first week on sale. Alpha contained the album's preceding internet track "Deathstar", in addition to "Driven" (which peaked in the top 10 of the Mainstream Rock Tracks chart). Alpha was the band's second album featuring Mayo on rhythm guitar and the first with him as part of the writing process. The band headlined a 57-date tour in early 2007 with Diecast, Invitro, and Red.

Retrospective 2, a CD/DVD including two previously unreleased studio tracks, live concert footage never before seen, and the music videos for the songs "Beg to Differ", "Ugly", "Pieces", and "Driven", was released on December 11, 2007.

Sevendust rejoined Grove and returned to the studio at the end of November 2007 to finish their seventh studio album Chapter VII: Hope & Sorrow. Released on April 1, 2008, the album debuted at No. 19 on the Billboard 200. Its first single "Prodigal Son" peaked at No. 19 on the Mainstream Rock Tracks chart. The single was followed by "The Past", which peaked at No. 27 on the Mainstream Rock Tracks chart and also featured Chris Daughtry as a special guest. Around the same time as the album's release, Sevendust announced Lowery had quit Dark New Day and would return to Sevendust in place of Mayo. On Lowery's return, Rose stated "This was extremely tough considering Sonny is our brother and has been amazing to work with. [Sonny] didn't do anything wrong at all; we just owe it to ourselves and all the folks that grew up with us to put our original band back together."

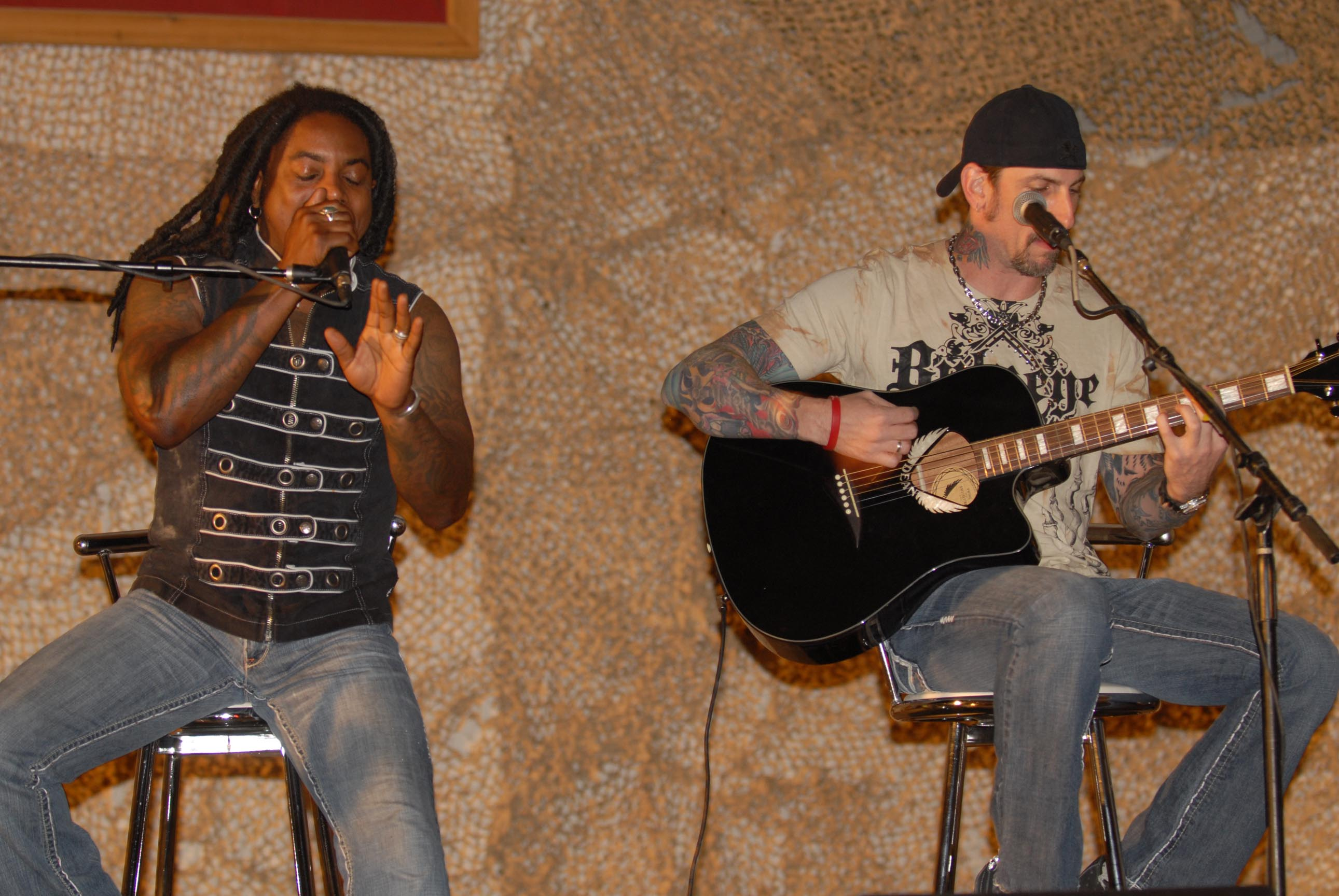
Sevendust performing at Bagram Air Field, Afghanistan

=== Cold Day Memory (2009–2011) ===
Sevendust toured with Black Stone Cherry in December 2008, with Disturbed in January 2009, and performed multiple shows for US troops in Iraq and Afghanistan in the spring. They released a limited-edition box set in November 2008 entitled Packaged Goods. Each five-disc set was autographed by the band. The box set included Next, Alpha, Retrospective 2 (CD/DVD), and Chapter VII: Hope and Sorrow.

In October 2009, Sevendust began recording Cold Day Memory in Chicago with producer Johnny K. The band launched a specialized website promoting the new album. During recording, the band posted daily videos on their official site and also their YouTube channel with updates on the album, recording sessions in the studio, and recording sessions from their new house. On February 6, 2010, the band uploaded "Forever Dead" on their website. Cold Day Memory was ultimately released on April 20, 2010. It was Sevendust's first studio recording with the original lineup since 2003's Seasons. The first official single "Unraveling" hit No. 29 on the Rock Songs chart and No. 7 on the Mainstream Rock Tracks chart. The album went to No. 12 on the Billboard 200. The album included two more singles, "Forever" and "Last Breath", both of which also charted.

Sevendust toured with Chevelle, Shinedown, Puddle of Mudd, and 10 Years on the Carnival of Madness tour during the summer of 2010. The band re-released their self-titled debut album called Sevendust: Definitive Edition later that year. It was the first time a Sevendust album was given a reissued "deluxe" treatment. In November, it was announced Sevendust would play with Disturbed, Korn, and In This Moment on the Music as a Weapon 5 tour. In February and March 2011, Sevendust toured in Australia with Iron Maiden, Slayer, Ill Niño, and Stone Sour for the Soundwave Festival.

=== Black Out the Sun and Time Travelers & Bonfires (2012–2014) ===
On June 27, 2012, Sevendust announced they would enter the studio for their next album on September 5, 2012. They entered Architekt Music Studio in Butler, New Jersey with engineer Mike Ferretti. In an October 2012 interview, Lowery described the album as "...a basic Sevendust record", stating "There's nothing, like, too completely different than anything we've done before. It's got a darker vibe to it. We've got a good amount of the programming element in there. It's a lot of what we do. It's heavy and it's got its melodic element in it". Additionally, he discussed the possibility of touring in early 2013 with Lacuna Coil.

Sevendust announced they would release the album Black Out the Sun on their 7Bros Records label (through Warner Music Group's Independent Label Group) on March 26, 2013. The album's debut single, "Decay", was released to radio and retail outlets on January 22, 2013. It peaked at No. 10 on the Mainstream Rock Tracks chart. Black Out the Sun landed at No. 1 on the Top Hard Rock Albums chart in the first week of its release. It became the band's best-selling album in its first week of release since 2007's Alpha.

Sevendust recorded an acoustic album in early 2014 and supported it with an acoustic tour. The album, Time Travelers & Bonfires, was released on April 15 via 7Bros Records, in conjunction with ADA Label Services. Half of the album contained new original compositions and the other half contained re-recorded songs from prior albums. The album's first single was the acoustic version of "Black", added on radio stations on March 25, 2014. The album sold around 15,000 copies in the US during its first week of release to debut at No. 19 on the Billboard 200.

=== Kill the Flaw and Grammy nomination (2015–2016) ===
It was reported the band finished recording their then-new album by late March 2015. The record, Kill the Flaw, was self-produced and recorded at Architekt Music Studio in Butler, New Jersey. It was released on October 2, 2015, via 7Bros Records with ADA/Warner Brothers distribution. The album debuted at No. 13 on the Billboard 200, selling over 21,000 units in the first week of release. On July 24, the band released the single "Thank You" to various rock radio stations around the US. Sevendust was announced as direct support on the then-upcoming Godsmack tour, which began on September 23, 2015. Sevendust traveled to Australia and New Zealand in March 2016. The tour was the band's first trip there in six years after their slated 2014 Soundwave Festival appearance was cancelled. The band previously suffered backlash from Australian fans who blamed the band for the last minute cancellation. "Thank You" was nominated for Best Metal Performance at the 2016 Grammy Awards, the band's first ever Grammy nomination. The band Ghost ultimately won the award. On January 27, 2016, the band announced a US headlining tour with Trivium and Like a Storm as direct support. Sevendust embarked on another headlining tour of North America including Canadian dates in August. Sevendust then released the Live in Denver acoustic DVD on December 14, 2016.

=== All I See Is War and Blood & Stone (2017–2022) ===
On March 1, 2017, Sevendust announced they were writing and demoing a new album. On July 6, 2017, Connolly posted a live video on Sevendust's Facebook page stating the band would go into the studio in November 2017 with producer Michael Baskette, with a tentative release in the spring of 2018. Additionally, he announced the band signed a deal with Rise Records.

Sevendust's 12th album, All I See Is War, was announced on February 28, 2018. The album's first single, "Dirty", was released on March 16, with a music video. "Dirty" eventually peaked at No. 17 on the Mainstream Rock Tracks chart. The album was released on May 11, 2018, via Rise Records. On April 20, the band began a headlining tour with support from Memphis May Fire, Fire from the Gods, and Madame Mayhem. In early 2019, Sevendust toured the US with Tremonti and Cane Hill. In April 2019, the band played an Australian leg to support All I See Is War.

The band's 13th album, Blood & Stone, was released on October 23, 2020, again through Rise Records. It was preceded by the single "The Day I Tried to Live", a Soundgarden cover, released on June 26, 2020. "Blood from a Stone" was the second single, released on August 28, followed by "Dying to Live" on October 20. On October 23, 2020, the band played its first livestream concert, "Sevendust: Live in Your Living Room".

In March 2021, Sevendust played the Animosity 21st Anniversary Tour with support from Tetrarch and Dead Poet Society. Sevendust played two special back-to-back livestream events where they performed the albums Seasons and Home in their entirety on April 10 and 11, respectively. In June and July 2021, the band played a socially-distanced US tour. A deluxe edition of Blood & Stone was released on December 10, 2021, via Rise Records, which included a few unreleased tracks from the album's sessions.

=== Truth Killer and One (2023–present) ===
On April 12, 2023, the band announced their 14th studio album Truth Killer, revealing its cover and track listing, followed by the first single, "Fence", with a music video. On May 11, Sevendust released the second single "Everything". "Everything" notably peaked at No. 6 on the Mainstream Rock Tracks chart (Sevendust's highest position on the chart up until then). Truth Killer was released on July 28, 2023, via Napalm Records.

In August 2023, the band supported Alter Bridge on the summer leg of the Pawns & Kings tour with Mammoth WVH and MJT. Sevendust completed a US co-headlining tour with Static-X and Dope in the fall of 2023, titled the Machine Killer tour.

Sevendust supported Alter Bridge on a tour of Europe in January 2026. On January 21, 2026, the band announced their fifteenth studio album One. It was preceded by four singles: "Is This the Real You", "Unbreakable", "Threshold", and "Construct". "Unbreakable", in particular, peaked at No. 17 on the Mainstream Rock Tracks chart, which continued Sevendust's streak of appearances on the aforementioned chart (dating back to their self-titled debut album). In addition to a headlining US tour alongside Atreyu, Fire from the Gods, and American Adrenaline, Sevendust also booked various festival appearances throughout 2026 in support of One.

== Musical style and influences ==
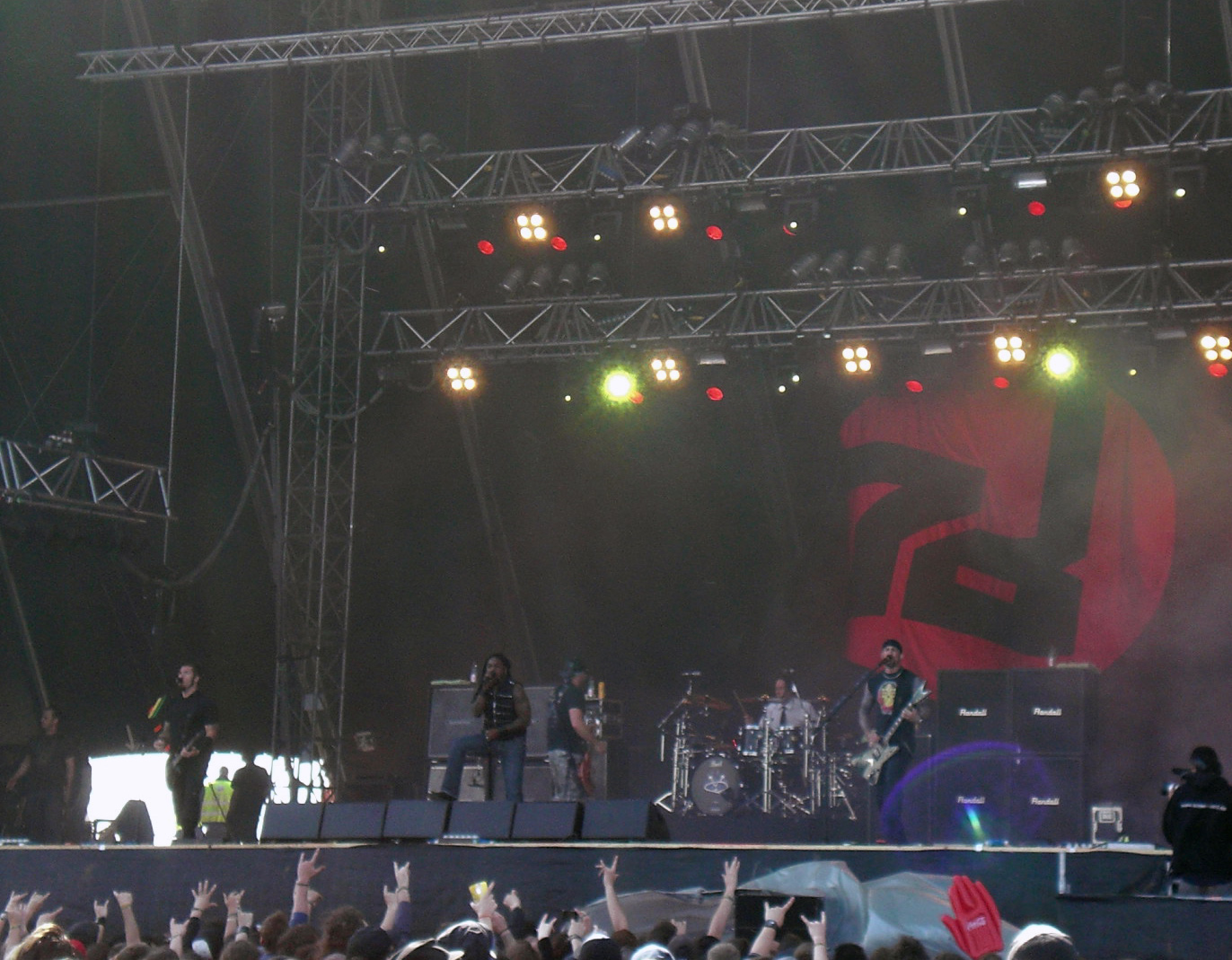
Sevendust at Nova Rock Festival 2009

Sevendust has been categorized as alternative metal, nu metal, hard rock, heavy metal, and post-grunge. According to Eli Enis of Revolver, the band employs a "grunge-inflected approach" to the nu metal style. Guitarist Connolly was asked what the band defined their genre as. He said:

"I don't know. I've been trying to figure that out. It was back in the day. People, for five minutes called us progressive, and then it was nu-metal. Then, all of a sudden, we were playing alternative metal. We are some kind of heavy and some kind of rock and some kind of metal."

According to AllMusic, Sevendust became one of the rising acts in the late 1990s but with aggressive blends (bottom-heavy riffs and soulful melodies). The band's lead singer, Lajon Witherspoon, has been praised for his soulful vocals. Mark Jenkins of Washington Post stated that "Witherspoon is more flexible than most heavy-rock vocalists, capable of lilting as convincingly as he growls." Ultimate Guitar mentioned, "He has a fairly distinct voice for metal, which originally helped the band stand out". Guitarist Lowery has been cited as a major part of Sevendust's sound. He is one of the main contributors to the band's style and sound, and is known for his raw melodies and empowering riffs. Lowery incorporates ultra-low baritone tunings, and creative 6-string tunings.

Sevendust's influences include Metallica, Anthrax, Testament, Ozzy Osbourne, Pantera, Van Halen, Steve Vai, Iron Maiden, Ronnie James Dio, Nine Inch Nails, and Suicidal Tendencies. Frontman Witherspoon said he is influenced by "so many" genres of music, "from R&B, to rock, to jazz, and classical." Witherspoon then said that he has been "influenced by everything."

== Side projects ==
- Lowery and Rose started a band called Call Me No One in 2012. They released an album, Last Parade, on June 5, 2012, and have publicly stated that the band will not continue.
- Connolly and Hornsby joined forces with Alter Bridge and Creed drummer Scott Phillips and former Submersed guitarist Eric Friedman to form a band called Projected. They have released three albums: Human in 2012, Ignite My Insanity in 2017, and Hypoxia in 2022.
- Lowery released four EPs under the moniker Hello Demons Meet Skeletons from 2008 to 2013. In 2020, he revived his solo career under his own name and released his debut full-length album God Bless the Renegades, produced by Baskette, in addition to a self-produced EP Grief & Distance, both released through Rise Records. In 2023, Lowery released the Ghostwriter EP.
- Rose released his debut solo EP, Controlled Chaos, via Rise Records in 2020.
- Rose formed Table 9 in 2022, an alternative metal supergroup featuring himself on vocals, drummer Shaun Foist of Breaking Benjamin, guitarist Barry Stock of Three Days Grace, guitarist Jose Urquiza of 3 Years Hollow, and bassist Jason Christopher of Prong.

== Band members ==
Current

- Vinnie Hornsby – bass (1994–present), backing vocals (2014–present)
- Morgan Rose – drums, backing vocals (1994–present), lead vocals (1994)
- John Connolly – rhythm guitar (1994–2005, 2008–present), backing vocals (1994–present), lead guitar (1994, 2005–2008)
- Lajon Witherspoon – lead vocals (1994–present)
- Clint Lowery – lead guitar, backing vocals (1995–2004, 2008–present)

Former

- Lee Banks – lead guitar (1994–1995)
- Sonny Mayo – rhythm guitar (2005–2008)

Timeline

== Discography ==
Studio albums

- Sevendust (1997)
- Home (1999)
- Animosity (2001)
- Seasons (2003)
- Next (2005)
- Alpha (2007)
- Chapter VII: Hope & Sorrow (2008)
- Cold Day Memory (2010)
- Black Out the Sun (2013)
- Time Travelers & Bonfires (2014)
- Kill the Flaw (2015)
- All I See Is War (2018)
- Blood & Stone (2020)
- Truth Killer (2023)
- One (2026)

== Awards and nominations ==
Grammy Awards

Year	Nominee / work	Award	Result
2016	"Thank You"	Best Metal Performance	Nominated

Loudwire Music Awards

Year	Nominee / work	Award	Result
2014	Black Out the Sun	Rock Album of the Year	Nominated
2014	"Decay"	Rock Song of the Year	Nominated
2015	Kill the Flaw	Rock Album of the Year	Nominated

Revolver Golden Gods Awards

Year	Nominee / work	Award	Result
2011	Sevendust	Best Live Band	Nominated
