= Home (Sevendust album) =

Studio album by Sevendust
- Released: August 24, 1999
- Recorded: 1999
- Studio: Long View Farm (North Brookfield, Massachusetts)
- Genres: Nu metal; alternative metal
- Length: 41:05
- Label: TVT
- Producers: Toby Wright; Sevendust

Sevendust chronology
Sevendust (1997)	Home (1999)	Animosity (2001)

Singles from Home
- 1. "Denial" Released: 1999; 2. "Licking Cream" Released: 1999; 3. "Waffle" Released: 2000; 4. "Home" Released: 2000; 5. "Bender" Released: 2000

Professional ratings
Review scores
Source	Rating
AllMusic	4/5 stars
Collector's Guide to Heavy Metal	7/10
Entertainment Weekly	C
Rolling Stone	3/5 stars

Home is the second studio album by the American rock band Sevendust, released on August 24, 1999, by TVT Records. The album appeared on the Billboard 200 chart, remained there for fourteen weeks and peaked at No. 19 on September 11, 1999. It was certified gold on May 18, 2000, by the Recording Industry Association of America (RIAA). The album features thirteen tracks on the US release and sixteen tracks on the Japanese release, with two tracks featuring artists outside of Sevendust. one of the album's songs was released as a single: "Waffle". "Licking Cream", "Denial", "Bender" and "Home" were released as promotional singles. "Denial" and "Waffle" appeared on Billboard's Mainstream Rock and Modern Rock Tracks charts.

== Track listing ==
All music is composed by Sevendust, except "Licking Cream", composed by Sevendust and Skin.

No.	Title	Lyrics	Length
1.	"Home"	Clint Lowery, Morgan Rose, John Connolly	3:34
2.	"Denial"	Lowery, Rose	4:17
3.	"Headtrip"	Lowery, Rose, Lajon Witherspoon	3:08
4.	"Insecure"		1:01
5.	"Reconnect"	Lowery, Rose, Witherspoon	3:37
6.	"Waffle"	Lowery, Rose, Witherspoon	3:30
7.	"Rumble Fish" (later known as "Assdrop")	Lowery, Rose, Witherspoon	3:21
8.	"Licking Cream" (featuring Skin)	Skin, Witherspoon, Lowery	3:17
9.	"Grasp"	Witherspoon, Rose	4:21
10.	"Crumbled"	Lowery, Rose, Witherspoon, Connolly	3:28
11.	"Feel So"	Lowery, Rose, Witherspoon, Connolly	3:38
12.	"Grasshopper"	Vinnie Hornsby	0:08
13.	"Bender" (featuring Chino Moreno and Troy McLawhorn)	Chino Moreno, Lowery, Rose, Witherspoon	3:45
Total length:			41:05

Japanese release

No.	Title	Length
14.	"Black" (Live)	4:13
15.	"Speak" (Live)	3:26
16.	"Too Close to Hate" (Live)	4:04

B-sides
No.	Title	Lyrics	Length
14.	"Fall" (released on the Scream 3 soundtrack)	Lowery, Rose	5:22

== Personnel ==
Credits taken from the CD liner notes. Sevendust

- Lajon Witherspoon – lead vocals
- Clint Lowery – lead guitar, backing vocals
- John Connolly – rhythm guitar
- Vinnie Hornsby – bass
- Morgan Rose – drums, backing vocals

Additional musicians

- Skin – additional vocals on "Licking Cream"
- Pony 1 – additional vocals on "Bender"
- Troy McLawhorn – additional guitar on "Bender"

Technical

- Jay Jay French – executive producer
- Toby Wright – producer, engineer
- Sevendust – producer
- Justin Walden – digital editing
- Jonathan Leary – assistant digital editing
- Robert "Jesse" Henderson – assistant digital editing
- Andy Wallace – mixing
- Steve Sisko – mixdown engineer
- Stephen Marcussen – mastering

Artwork

- Michelle Munoz-Dorna – art design
- Roger Gorman – art design
- Robin Glowski – art direction
- Jon Gipe – photography
- Caroline Greyshock – photography
- Jana Leon – photography
- Neil Zlozower – photography

== Charts ==
Chart performance for Home
Chart (1999–2000)	Peak position
Australian Albums (ARIA)	73
New Zealand Albums (RMNZ)	26
US Billboard 200	19

== Certifications ==
Region	Certification	Certified units/sales
United States (RIAA)	Gold	500,000^{^}
^{^} Shipments figures based on certification alone.

== Release history ==
Region	Date	Label	Format	Catalog	Ref.
United States	1999	Epic	CD	4961579	
United States	1999	TVT	CS	5820	
Japan	2000	Import	CD	87210	
United States	2000	Festival	CD	12986	
United States	2000	Toy's Factory	CD	TFCK87210	
Japan	2002	Dream On	CD	7009	
United States	2002	Dream On	CD	DOR-7009	
