= Sonny Mayo =

American guitarist (born 1971)

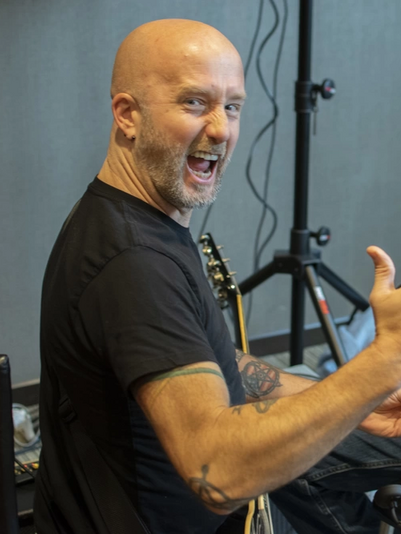
- Mayo in 2018

Background information
- Born: July 16, 1971 (age 54); Washington, D.C., U.S.
- Genres: Alternative metal; nu metal; hardcore punk; funk metal; punk rock
- Occupations: Musician; producer; songwriter
- Instrument: Guitar
- Years active: 1992–present
- Formerly of: Sevendust; Hed PE; Amen; Snot

Ronald D. Mayo (born July 16, 1971) is an American guitarist. He is best known for playing with Snot, Amen, and Sevendust, co-writing several albums. He co-founded Rock to Recovery, a music therapy non-profit, in 2014.

== Career ==
Mayo began playing in a thrash metal band called Silence in the late 1980s. Silence (John Mayes, Benjamin Gaither, Louie Denslow, Jason Robinson and Sonny), regularly sold out venues in the DC Metro area including the "Bayou" in Georgetown. While with Silence, he released a nine track CD, Vision, and recorded a three song tape with Alex Perialas (who produced Anthrax, Overkill, S.O.D., etc.). One of the songs from the tape, "One Race" was made into a black and white video filmed at the Bayou (note, the director of the video was John Brenkus, who now does Sport Science on ESPN).

He then joined M.F. Pitbulls with Shannon Larkin (Wrathchild America, Ugly Kid Joe, Amen, now Godsmack) on vocals, Jamie Miller (Snot, Bad Religion, TheStart) on drums, and John "Tumor" Fahnestock (Snot, Amen, Noise Within) on bass.

In 1995, Mayo moved to Santa Barbara to join the band Snot. Snot was signed to Geffen Records in 1996 and recorded their only full-length release, Get Some, in May 1997. Mayo then rejoined Shannon Larkin in the band Amen in 1998 and subsequently recorded and released albums on Roadrunner Records (Amen self-titled) and Virgin Records (We Have Come For Your Parents). In 1998, Mayo contributed to the Vanilla Ice album Hard to Swallow.

In 2002, Mayo replaced Chad Benekos in Hed PE. He toured in support of the album Blackout.

On January 19, 2005, he got a call from Morgan Rose to join Sevendust after Clint Lowery left for Dark New Day. Mayo co-wrote and recorded three full-length releases with Sevendust. Next – Winedark Records, 2005; Alpha – Asylum Records, 2007; and Chapter 7: Hope & Sorrow – Asylum, 2008. In early 2008, Mayo was replaced by the original Sevendust guitarist, Clint Lowery. According to Mayo, he was not pleased with the way he was fired.

Shortly after departing Sevendust, Snot reformed with ex-Divine Heresy frontman Tommy Vext on vocals. Snot wrote and recorded new material and toured the U.S. supporting Mudvayne in late 2008. Mayo decided not to continue with Snot in May 2009, and enrolled in the Recording Institute Of Technology program at the Musicians Institute in Hollywood, California. After receiving a certificate in audio engineering and Pro Tools certification, Mayo produced and engineered several bands and artists.

In 2011, Mayo engineered and co-produced Ugly Kid Joe's Stairway to Hell album then joined the band in 2012 as touring guitarist, filling in for Dave Fortman.

In June 2014, Sonny joined Wesley Geer in the non-profit organization, Rock to Recovery, which harnesses the healing power of music by bringing musical instruments and equipment in to treatment facilities to write and record original songs with people recovering from drug/alcohol addiction, PTSD, eating disorders, and other illnesses.

In June 2015, Sonny joined Ugly Kid Joe in the studio to write/record Uglier Than They Used ta Be, which released in late 2015.
