= Sevendust (album) =

Studio album by Sevendust
- Released: April 15, 1997
- Studio: Triclops (Atlanta, Georgia)
- Genre: Nu metal
- Length: 48:27
- Label: TVT
- Producers: Mark Mendoza; Jay Jay French

Sevendust chronology
Sevendust (1997)	Home (1999)

Alternative cover
- Definitive Edition cover

Singles from Sevendust
- 1. "Black" Released: 1997; 2. "Breathe" Released: 1997; 3. "Bitch" Released: 1998; 4. "Too Close to Hate" Released: 1998

Sevendust is the debut studio album by the American rock band Sevendust, released on April 15, 1997, through TVT Records.

The Japan reissue has live versions of the songs "Bitch" and "Prayer" as ending bonus tracks.

Sevendust celebrated the 20th anniversary of the release of the album by performing the record in its entirety at a special hometown show on March 17, 2017, at the Masquerade in Atlanta, Georgia.

In 2021, the staff of Revolver included the album in their list of the "20 Essential Nu-Metal Albums".

== Release and reception ==
Professional ratings
Review scores
Source	Rating
AllMusic	3/5 stars
Collector's Guide to Heavy Metal	5/10

The album sold only 311 copies in its first week but ultimately achieved gold certification.

The album appeared on the Billboard 200 chart, remained there for sixteen weeks, and peaked at No. 165 on April 4, 1998. It was certified gold by the Recording Industry Association of America (RIAA) on May 19, 1999, and has sold at least 732,000 copies in the US. Four of the album's songs were released as promotional singles: "Black", "Breathe", "Bitch" and "Too Close to Hate". The album was re-mastered and re-released on June 21, 2010, entitled "The Definitive Edition", featuring two B-sides and two live tracks.

== Track listing ==
All tracks are written by Sevendust.

No.	Title	Length
1.	"Black"	4:08
2.	"Bitch"	3:41
3.	"Terminator"	4:54
4.	"Too Close to Hate"	4:48
5.	"Wired"	3:55
6.	"Prayer"	4:18
7.	"Face"	4:47
8.	"Speak"	3:28
9.	"Will It Bleed"	4:51
10.	"My Ruin"	5:38
11.	"Born to Die"	3:59
Total length:		48:27

Definitive Edition bonus tracks
No.	Title	Writer(s)	Length
12.	"Breathe" (from the Strangeland soundtrack)		3:17
13.	"School's Out" (Alice Cooper cover)	Alice Cooper; Michael Bruce; Glen Buxton; Dennis Dunaway; Neal Smith	3:22
14.	"Bitch" (Live)		4:01
15.	"Prayer" (Live)		4:13
16.	"Terminator" (Breathe Remix)		4:37
Total length:			67:57

Definitive Edition DVD

1. Live and Loud
2. Electronic Press Kit (1997)
3. Behind the Scenes & Live Footage

== Personnel ==
Credits taken from the CD liner notes.

Sevendust

- Lajon Witherspoon – lead vocals
- Clint Lowery – guitar, backing vocals
- John Connolly – guitar, backing vocals
- Vinnie Hornsby – bass
- Morgan Rose – drums, backing vocals

Technical

- Mark Mendoza – producer, mixing
- Jay Jay French – producer, executive producer
- Denny McNerney – engineering, mixing
- John Nielsen – assistant engineer
- Lou Holtzman – assistant mixer
- Howie Weinberg – mastering

== Charts ==
=== Album ===
Chart (1998)	Peak position
US Billboard 200	165
US Heatseekers Albums (Billboard)	5

=== Singles ===
Year	Single	Chart	Peak position
1998	"Black"	US Mainstream Rock	30
1998	"Bitch"	US Mainstream Rock	30
1998	"Too Close to Hate"	US Mainstream Rock	39

== Certifications ==
Region	Certification	Certified units/sales
United States (RIAA)	Gold	500,000^{^}
^{^} Shipments figures based on certification alone.

== Release history ==
Region	Date	Label	Format	Catalog
United States	1997	TVT	CD	5730
United States	1997	TVT	CS	5730
China	2000	Import	CD	87230
United States	2000	Toy's Factory	CD	TFCK87230
China	2002	Dream On	CD	7010
United States	2002	Dream On	CD	DOR-7010
United States	2010	TVT	CD/DVD	TV6770
