= John Connolly (musician) =

American guitarist

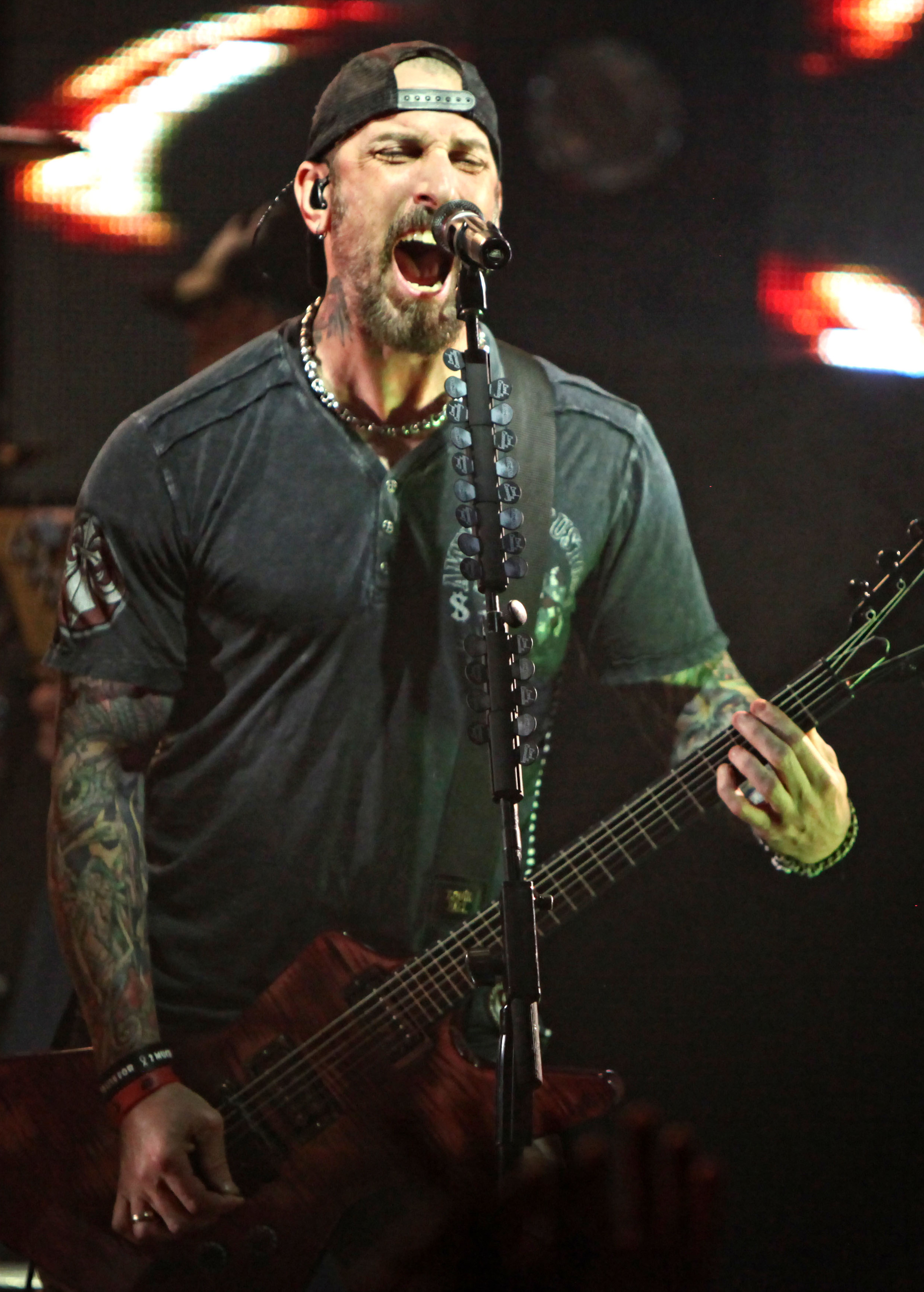
- Connolly performing in 2013

Background information
- Born: October 21, 1968 (age 57); New Jersey, U.S.
- Genres: Alternative metal; heavy metal; nu metal; thrash metal; power metal; hard rock
- Occupation: Musician
- Instruments: Guitar, drums, vocals
- Years active: 1988–present

John Connolly (born October 21, 1968) is an American musician best known as one of two guitarists in rock band Sevendust. Connolly is known for his fire-designed custom-made Les Paul guitar designed by Epiphone, but has since switched to Dean Guitars.

== Career ==
=== Piece Dogs ===
In 1988, John Connolly, accompanied by vocalist Greg Anderson, guitarist Mike Grimmett and bassist Kyle Sanders started a band called Piece Dogs in Atlanta, Georgia. In 1992, Piece Dogs released an LP titled Exes for Eyes through Energy Rekords. Connolly was the band's original drummer. The band genre was power and thrash metal. Piece Dogs disbanded several months after releasing the album.

=== Sevendust ===
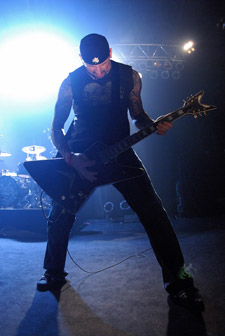
Connolly performing in 2009

In 1994, Connolly joined the rock band Sevendust as a guitarist, and has since been with the band through all of their studio releases. He also provides backing vocals.

=== Projected ===
In 2012, Connolly formed a rock supergroup consisting of Connolly on guitar and lead vocals, fellow Sevendust member Vinnie Hornsby, Alter Bridge and Creed drummer Scott Phillips, and former Submersed and current Tremonti guitarist Eric Friedman. The band released their first album Human in June 2012, before falling into inactivity as members returned to their respective bands in late 2012. The band released their second studio album, Ignite My Insanity, in July 2017.

== Personal life ==
Connolly married his wife Lori on March 24, 2001. They have a daughter. He cited KISS (Alive! specifically) as his primary entry point into music, noting that the theatricality and spectacle of the band were major draws for him as an eight-year-old.

== Discography ==
=== Piece Dogs ===
- Exes for Eyes (1992)

=== Sevendust ===
- Sevendust (1997)
- Home (1999)
- Animosity (2001)
- Seasons (2003)
- Next (2005)
- Alpha (2007)
- Chapter VII: Hope and Sorrow (2008)
- Cold Day Memory (2010)
- Black Out the Sun (2013)
- Time Travelers & Bonfires (2014)
- Kill the Flaw (2015)
- All I See Is War (2018)
- Blood & Stone (2020)
- Truth Killer (2023)

=== Projected ===
- Human (2012)
- Ignite My Insanity (2017)
- Hypoxia (2022)

== Gear ==
=== Guitars ===
Current

- Dean Soltero (USA Custom Shop for John)
- Dean Soltero (Japanese Custom Shop)
- Dean Black Gold Z
- Dean Z '79 Silverback reissue
- Dean Z
- Dean Stealth Two Tone

Past

- Epiphone signature John Connolly Les Paul guitar
- Gibson Les Paul Customs (78' and 79')
- Gibson Explorer
- Gibson Les Paul Studios (83', 91')

Not Sure

- 12 string Epiphone Les Paul
- Yahama acoustic

=== Effects and more ===
- Digitech XP-100 Whammy II Wah
- Dunlop Uni-Vibe / Wah Controller Pedal
- Dunlop DCR-ISR Crybaby Rack Wah
- Korg DTR-2 Rack Tuner
- Mesa/Boogie Amp Switcher
- Rocktron Hush IICX Noise Gate
- Shure Wireless
- MXR Phase 90
- TC Electronic pedals (studio)
- Electro-Harmonix (studio)
- Dimebag Wah (Dunlop DB01)
- Vox Tonelab

=== Strings ===
- Dean Markley Blue Steel strings
