= Lajon Witherspoon =

American singer

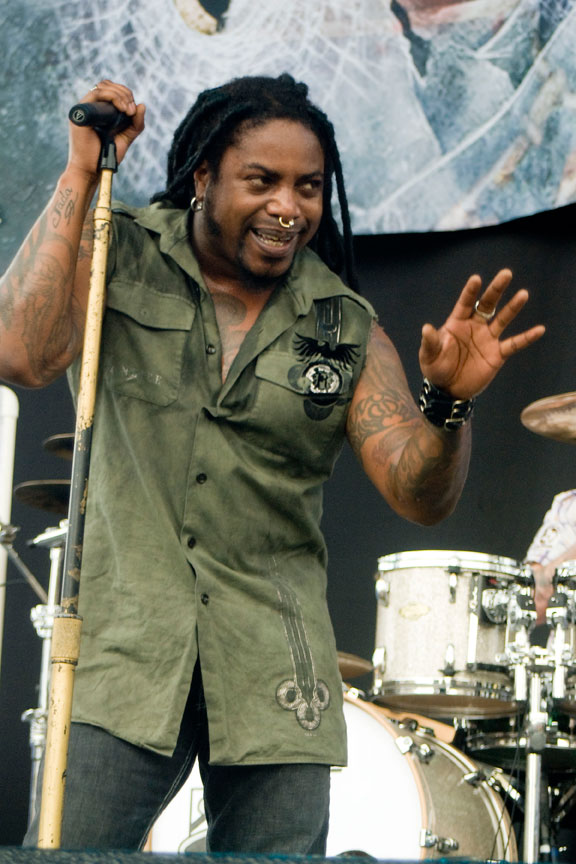
- Witherspoon in 2010

Background information
- Born: October 3, 1972 (age 54); Nashville, Tennessee, U.S.
- Origin: Atlanta, Georgia, U.S.
- Genres: Alternative metal; nu metal
- Occupations: Singer; songwriter
- Years active: 1988–present
- Member of: Sevendust
- Formerly of: Body & Soul
- Website: Lajon Witherspoon on Facebook

Lajon Jermaine Witherspoon (born October 3, 1972) is an American singer best known as the lead vocalist of Atlanta-based rock band Sevendust.

Members from bands such as Staind, Seether, Alter Bridge, and Diecast have listed Witherspoon and Sevendust as musical influences. In March 2008, Witherspoon was ranked at number 35 in Hit Parader's "Top 100 Metal Vocalists of All Time".

== Early life and career ==
Lajon Witherspoon was born in Nashville, Tennessee, but grew up in Atlanta, Georgia with his parents, along with his brother Reginald Ladon Witherspoon. Witherspoon's father was a singer in a funk band when his family lived in Nashville. Before getting into music, Witherspoon played football and wrestled for Norcross High School. He also practiced judo for a number of years, but eventually chose music over sports as his primary activity. He worked at Hardee's. Growing up, Witherspoon listened to Black Sabbath, Pink Floyd, Thin Lizzy, Jimi Hendrix, Grateful Dead, Aretha Franklin, and Stevie Wonder.

Before his days in Sevendust, Witherspoon was the frontman of a funk rock band, Body & Soul. In 1994, his group supported local band Snake Nation at a gig. Impressed by his vocal abilities, Vinnie Hornsby and Morgan Rose asked Witherspoon to sing for their band. Guitarist John Connolly, the former drummer of the Piece Dogs, and Lee Banks joined them to form Rumblefish. The name was soon changed to Crawlspace. When the band's schedule proved too much for Banks, Clint Lowery from North Carolina's Still Rain replaced him. The band had to change their name again when a group on the west coast claimed the rights to it. Struggling with a new moniker, the members settled on Sevendust after Hornsby found a can of Sevin insecticide powder in his grandmother's garage.

On Saturday, November 9, 2002, Lajon's brother Reginald (age 23) was fatally shot in Nashville, Tennessee. Lajon heard the news from his father just minutes before the band's performance in St. Joseph, Minnesota. His father urged him to go on with the show and dedicate it to Reginald. Sevendust had postponed all shows until November 15 where they performed in Hampton Beach, New Hampshire.

Lajon Witherspoon recorded a song titled "Ready to Go" for the NHRA's 10-song compilation, released on June 1, 2010. He talked about recording a solo project after the end of the touring and promotion cycle for Sevendust's ninth record, Black Out the Sun. He has released three singles called "Love Song," "Black or White," and a cover of "Chainsmoking" originally performed by Jacob Banks. In regards to "Love Song," Lajon said, "I think it resonates with what's going on in the world today," regarding the inspiration of the song.

== Personal life ==
Witherspoon has a wife, Ashley; two daughters, Maya Diane and Jada Legend; and a son, Kingston. They live in Overland Park, Kansas.

Witherspoon is a devout Christian.

== Discography ==
=== Other appearances ===
- NHRA Compilation 2010 – various artists – "Ready to Go" (2010)
- A Dream in Static – Earthside – "Mob Mentality" (2015)
- Truth Rising – Hed PE – "Stand Up" (2010)
- Moment of Impact – Eye Empire – "Victim (of the System)" (2010)
- Dearly Beloved – Daughtry – "Hunger Strike" (2021)
- Intercorrupted – Ra – "Nobody Loves You" (2021)
