= 2020 in heavy metal music =

This is a timeline documenting the events of heavy metal in the year 2020.

== Bands formed ==
- Act of Denial
- Bodom After Midnight
- Disembodied Tyrant
- Kanonenfieber
- Ov Sulfur
- Sleep Theory
- Worm Shepherd

== Bands disbanded ==
- Abnormality
- Absu
- All Shall Perish
- Anathema (hiatus)
- Dream On, Dreamer
- Falconer
- Lynch Mob
- Morgoth
- Myka Relocate
- Nachtmystium
- Obey the Brave
- SHVPES
- Slapshock
- Stone Sour (hiatus)
- Unlocking the Truth
- Van Halen

== Bands reformed ==
- Affiance
- The Amenta
- Attack Attack!
- Dark the Suns
- Darkwoods My Betrothed
- Forced Entry
- Genghis Tron
- I, the Breather
- To/Die/For
- Trail of Tears
- Vektor

== Deaths ==
- January 4 – Nick Blagona, recording engineer of multiple Deep Purple, Ian Gillan, and Rainbow albums, died from multiple organ failure at the age of 74.
- January 7 – Neil Peart, drummer of Rush, died from brain cancer at the age of 67.
- January 24 – Joe Payne, former bassist of Nile and Divine Heresy, died from undisclosed reasons at the age of 35.
- January 24 – Sean Reinert, former drummer of Cynic and Death, died from undisclosed reasons at the age of 48.
- January 26 – Santtu Lonka, former drummer of To/Die/For, died from undisclosed reasons at the age of 41.
- January 27 – Reed Mullin, drummer of Corrosion of Conformity, died from undisclosed reasons at the age of 53.
- January 31 – Josh Pappe, former bassist of D.R.I. and Gang Green, died from undisclosed reasons at the age of 53.
- February 6 – Diego Farias, former guitarist of Volumes, died from undisclosed reasons at the age of 27.
- February 24 – Justin Frear, former guitarist of Ultimatum, died from a heart attack at the age of 47.
- March 7 – Mikro Virdis, former drummer of Trick or Treat, died from a car crash at the age of 38.
- March 9 – Keith Olsen, former producer of numerous artists, including Bruce Dickinson, Ozzy Osbourne, Scorpions, and Whitesnake, died from cardiac arrest at the age of 74.
- March 16 – Jason Rainey, former guitarist of Sacred Reich, died from a heart attack at the age of 53.
- March 24 – Bill Rieflin, former drummer of Ministry, KMFDM, and Revolting Cocks, died from cancer at the age of 59.
- March 28 – Lou A. Kouvaris, former guitarist of Riot, died from COVID-19 at the age of 66.
- April 21 – Derek Jones, guitarist of Falling in Reverse, died from undisclosed reasons at the age of 35.
- April 26 – McKenzie Bell, former guitarist of He Is Legend, died from undisclosed reasons at the age of 35.
- April 28 – Bob Fouts, former drummer of the Gates of Slumber and Burn It Down, died from undisclosed reasons at the age of 45.
- May 13 – Derek Lawrence, former producer of Deep Purple, Wishbone Ash, and Quiet Riot, died from cancer at the age of 78.
- May 28 – Bob Kulick, former session guitarist of Kiss and W.A.S.P., died from heart disease at the age of 70.
- June 1 – Joey Image, former drummer of Misfits, died from liver cancer at the age of 63.
- June 9 – Paul Chapman, former guitarist of UFO and Waysted, died from undisclosed reasons at the age of 66.
- June 16 – Yuji "You" Adachi, guitarist of Dead End, died from sepsis at the age of 56.
- July 16 – Jamie Oldaker, former drummer of Frehley's Comet, died from cancer at the age of 68.
- August 4 – Tony Costanza, former drummer of Machine Head and Crowbar, died from undisclosed reasons at the age of 52.
- August 7 – Alan Peters, former bassist of Agnostic Front, died from undisclosed reasons at the age of 55.
- August 9 – Martin Birch, producer and engineer for albums by Iron Maiden, Black Sabbath and Deep Purple, died from undisclosed reasons at the age of 71.
- August 14 – Pete Way, former bassist of UFO, Michael Schenker Group, Fastway and Waysted, died from life-threatening injuries at the age of 69.
- August 18 – Jack Sherman, former guitarist of Red Hot Chili Peppers, died from undisclosed reasons at the age of 64.
- August 20 – Frankie Banali, drummer of Quiet Riot and former drummer of W.A.S.P., died from pancreatic cancer at the age of 68.
- August 24 – Riley Gale, vocalist of Power Trip, died from fentanyl overdose at the age of 34.
- August 25 – Enrique Maseda, vocalist of NJ Bloodline, died from undisclosed reasons.
- August 31 – Jay White, bassist of the Agony Scene, died from undisclosed reasons.
- September 5 – Greg Messick, guitarist of Intruder, died from undisclosed reasons at the age of 55.
- September 19 – Lee Kerslake, former drummer of Ozzy Osbourne and Uriah Heep, died from prostate cancer at the age of 73.
- September 25 – Brent Young, former bassist of Trivium, died from undisclosed reasons at the age of 37.
- September 26 – Mark Stone, former bassist of Van Halen, died from cancer.
- September 28 – Donny Hillier, vocalist of Trauma, died from undisclosed reasons.
- October 6 – Eddie Van Halen, guitarist of Van Halen, died from throat cancer at the age of 65.
- October 12 – Timo Ketola, also known as Davthvs, illustrator and cover artist for numerous metal bands, including Asphyx, Deathspell Omega, Dissection, Funeral Mist, Grave, Marduk, Opeth, Therion, and Watain, died from leukemia at the age of 45.
- October 21 – Marc Evans, former guitarist of Hecate Enthroned, died by suicide at the age of 48.
- November 4 – Ken Hensley, former keyboardist of Uriah Heep, died from undisclosed reasons at the age of 75.
- November 25 – Aaron Melzer, former vocalist of Secrets, died from undisclosed reasons.
- November 26 – Jamir Garcia, vocalist of Slapshock, died from committing suicide by hanging at the age of 42.
- December 9 – Sean Malone, bassist of Cynic, died from committing suicide at the age of 50.
- December 22 – Leslie West, vocalist and guitarist of Mountain, died from cardiac arrest at the age of 75.
- December 29 – Alexi Laiho, vocalist and guitarist of Children of Bodom and Bodom After Midnight, died from alcohol-induced degeneration of the liver at the age of 41.

== Albums released ==
=== January ===
Day	Artist	Album
3	Stabbing Westward	Dead & Gone (EP)
10	Apocalyptica	Cell-0
10	Haunt	Mind Freeze
10	Mystic Prophecy	Metal Division
10	Poppy	I Disagree
10	Rage	Wings of Rage
17	Antagonist A.D.	Through Fire (EP)
17	Bleed the Sky	This Way Lies Madness
17	British Lion	The Burning
17	Kaoteon	Kaoteon
17	Mark Morton	Ether (EP)
17	Odious Mortem	Synesthesia
17	Sons of Apollo	MMXX
20	Impiety	Versus All Gods
24	Annihilator	Ballistic, Sadistic
24	Breaking Benjamin	Aurora
24	Davey Suicide	Rock Ain't Dead
24	Dawn of Solace	Waves
24	Higher Power	27 Miles Underwater
24	Jorn	Heavy Rock Radio II – Executing the Classics (covers album)
24	Kirk Windstein	Dream in Motion
24	Marko Hietala	Pyre of the Black Heart
24	Nero di Marte	Immoto
24	Novelists	Cèst La Vie
24	Pyogenesis	A Silent Soul Screams Loud
24	Temperance	Viridian
24	Thy Catafalque	Naiv
29	Lovebites	Electric Pentagram
31	Amberian Dawn	Looking for You
31	Clint Lowery	God Bless the Renegades
31	Gnaw	Barking Orders (EP)
31	Lordi	Killection
31	Lorna Shore	Immortal
31	Serenity	The Last Knight
31	Theory of a Deadman	Say Nothing

=== February ===
Day	Artist	Album
7	Delain	Apocalypse & Chill
7	God Dethroned	Illuminati
7	Loathe	I Let It in and It Took Everything
7	Napalm Death	Logic Ravaged by Brute Force (EP)
7	Sepultura	Quadra
7	Stone Temple Pilots	Perdida
7	Sylosis	Cycle of Suffering
14	Anvil	Legal at Last
14	Diabulus in Musica	Euphonic Entropy
14	Hollywood Undead	New Empire, Vol. 1
14	Ihsahn	Telemark (EP)
14	Kreator	London Apocalypticon – Live at the Roundhouse (DVD)
14	Kvelertak	Splid
14	Necrowretch	The Ones from Hell
14	Psychotic Waltz	The God-Shaped Void
14	Suicide Silence	Become the Hunter
20	Reflections	Willow
21	The Amity Affliction	Everyone Loves You... Once You Leave Them
21	Biff Byford	School of Hard Knocks
21	Demons & Wizards	III
21	H.E.A.T	H.E.A.T II
21	Lost Society	No Absolution
21	Mondo Generator	Fuck It
21	On Thorns I Lay	Threnos
21	Ozzy Osbourne	Ordinary Man
21	Polaris	The Death of Me
21	The Word Alive	Monomania
28	Beneath the Massacre	Fearmonger
28	Dark Fortress	Spectres from the Old World
28	Five Finger Death Punch	F8
28	Intronaut	Fluid Existential Inversions
28	John Dolmayan	These Grey Men (covers album)
28	Neaera	Neaera
28	Nils Patrik Johansson	The Great Conspiracy
28	Shakra	Mad World
28	Today Is the Day	No Good to Anyone
28	Tombs	Monarchy of Shadows (EP)

=== March ===
Day	Artist	Album
6	Allen/Olzon	Worlds Apart
6	Body Count	Carnivore
6	Crematory	Unbroken
6	Harem Scarem	Change the World
6	My Dying Bride	The Ghost of Orion
6	Ross the Boss	Born of Fire
6	Semblant	Obscura
6	Trauma	Ominous Black
12	Ded	Mannequin Eyes (EP)
13	Burzum	Thulêan Mysteries
13	Code Orange	Underneath
13	Conny Bloom	Game! Set! Bloom!
13	Gotthard	#13
13	Haggard Cat	Common Sense Holiday
13	Invent Animate	Greyview
13	Stitched Up Heart	Darkness
13	Vulcano	Eye in Hell
13	Wolf	Feeding the Machine
18	Lynch	Ultima
20	Heaven Shall Burn	Of Truth and Sacrifice
20	Lucifer	Lucifer III
20	Myrkur	Folkesange
20	Thanatos	Violent Death Rituals
20	VV	Gothica Fennica, Vol. 1 (EP)
23	Old Man Gloom	Seminar IX: Darkness of Being
26	Nine Inch Nails	Ghosts V: Together
26	Nine Inch Nails	Ghosts VI: Locusts
27	Ayreon	Electric Castle Live and Other Tales (live album)
27	Candlemass	The Pendulum (EP)
27	Deranged	Deeds of Ruthless Violence
27	Disbelief	The Ground Collapses
27	Igorrr	Spirituality and Distortion
27	In This Moment	Mother
27	Mamaleek	Come & See
27	Parkway Drive	Viva the Underdogs (live album)

=== April ===
Day	Artist	Album
2	Necrodeath	Neraka (EP)
3	Ad Infinitum	Chapter I: Monarchy
3	August Burns Red	Guardians
3	Blaze Bayley	Live in Czech (live album)
3	Bonfire	Fistful of Fire
3	Conception	State of Deception
3	Dynazty	The Dark Delight
3	Red	Declaration
3	Testament	Titans of Creation
3	WVRM	Colony Collapse
10	Archgoat	Black Mass XXX (live album)
10	Azusa	Loop of Yesterdays
10	Benighted	Obscene Repressed
10	Dream On, Dreamer	What If I Told You It Doesn't Get Better
10	Metal Church	From the Vault (compilation album)
10	Nightwish	Human. :II: Nature.
15	Outrage	Run Riot
17	Aborted	La Grande Mascarade (EP)
17	Abysmal Dawn	Phylogenesis
17	The Black Dahlia Murder	Verminous
17	Cadaver	D.G.A.F. (EP)
17	Khemmis	Doomed Heavy Metal (EP)
17	Myrath	Live in Carthage (live album)
17	Oranssi Pazuzu	Mestarin Kynsi
17	Turmion Kätilöt	Global Warning
22	Matenrou Opera	Chronos (EP)
24	Axel Rudi Pell	Sign of the Times
24	Cirith Ungol	Forever Black
24	Danzig	Danzig Sings Elvis (covers album)
24	Elder	Omens
24	Katatonia	City Burials
24	Mantric	False Negative
24	Trick or Treat	The Legend of the XII Saints
24	Trivium	What the Dead Men Say
24	Ulcerate	Stare into Death and Be Still
24	Warbringer	Weapons of Tomorrow

=== May ===
Day	Artist	Album
1	Havok	V
1	Killswitch Engage	Atonement II: B-Sides for Charity (EP)
1	Orange Goblin	Rough & Ready, Live & Loud (live album)
1	Vader	Solitude in Madness
1	Witchcraft	Black Metal
8	...And Oceans	Cosmic World Mother
8	Brant Bjork	Brant Bjork
8	Destruction	Born to Thrash – Live in Germany (live album)
8	Forgotten Tomb	Nihilistic Estrangement
8	Green Carnation	Leaves of Yesteryear
8	Mekong Delta	Tales of a Future Past
8	Naglfar	Cerecloth
8	Oathbreaker	Ease Me & 4 Interpretations (EP)
8	Secrets of the Moon	Black House
8	Winterfylleth	The Reckoning Dawn
15	Abramelin	Never Enough Snuff
15	AC×DC	Satan Is King
15	Asking Alexandria	Like a House on Fire
15	Binary Code	Memento Mori
15	Firewind	Firewind
15	Paradise Lost	Obsidian
15	Ravenscry	100
15	Tokyo Blade	Dark Revolution
15	Triptykon	Requiem (Live at Roadburn 2019) (live album)
15	Voodoo Gods	The Divinity of Blood
22	Caligula's Horse	Rise Radiant
22	Crossfaith	Species (EP)
22	Fairyland	Osyrhianta
22	Killitorous	The Afterparty
22	Old Man Gloom	Seminar VIII: Light of Meaning
22	Oz	Forced Commandments
22	Revenge	Strike.Smother.Dehumanize
22	Sinister	Deformation of the Holy Realm
22	Soulfly	Live Ritual NYC MMXIX (EP)
27	Novelbright	Wonderland
29	Acârash	Descend to Purity
29	Alestorm	Curse of the Crystal Coconut
29	Behemoth	A Forest (EP)
29	Bleed from Within	Fracture
29	Centinex	Death in Pieces
29	Def Leppard	London to Vegas (live album)
29	Grave Digger	Fields of Blood
29	Sorcerer	Lamenting of the Innocent
29	Xibalba	Años en Infierno

=== June ===
Day	Artist	Album
5	16	Dream Squasher
5	The Ghost Inside	The Ghost Inside
11	Power Trip	Live in Seattle – 05.28.2018 (live album)
12	Anonymus	La Bestia
12	Behold... The Arctopus	Hapeleptic Overtrove
12	BPMD	American Made (covers album)
12	Clint Lowery	Grief & Distance (EP)
12	Lord	Chaos Raining (EP)
12	Magnus Karlsson's Free Fall	We Are the Night
12	Michael Angelo Batio	More Machine Than Man
17	SiM	Thank God, There Are Hundreds of Ways to Kill Enemies
18	Protest the Hero	Palimpsest
19	Alarum	Circle's End
19	Beyond the Black	Hørizøns
19	Cro-Mags	In the Beginning
19	Eisregen	Leblos
19	Lamb of God	Lamb of God
19	Make Them Suffer	How to Survive a Funeral
19	Mushroomhead	A Wonderful Life
19	Rise of the Northstar	Live in Paris (EP)
19	Spirit Adrift	Angel & Abyss Redux EP (EP)
19	The Sword	Chronology 2006–2018 (compilation album)
19	The Sword	Conquest of Kingdoms (compilation album)
19	Trapt	Shadow Work
19	Trash Talk	Squalor (EP)
22	Al-Namrood	Wala'at
25	Thomas Giles	Feel Better (EP)
26	Ahab	Live Prey (live album)
26	Carach Angren	Franckensteina Strataemontanus
26	Emmure	Hindsight
26	Falconer	From a Dying Ember
26	Ice Nine Kills	Undead & Unplugged: Live from the Overlook Hotel (EP)
26	Long Distance Calling	How Do We Want to Live?
26	Mantar	Grungetown Hooligans II (covers album)
26	Mike Lepond's Silent Assassins	Whore of Babylon
26	Paysage d'Hiver	Im Wald
26	Pyrrhon	Abscess Time
26	Wino	Forever Gone

=== July ===
Day	Artist	Album
3	Boris	NO
3	Bury Tomorrow	Cannibal
3	Haunt	Flashback
3	Henry Derek Elis	All the Pretty Little Horses (EP)
3	Jesu	Never (EP)
3	Khemmis	More Songs About Death, Vol. 1 (EP)
3	Poltergeist	Feather of Truth
3	Powerwolf	Best of the Blessed (compilation album)
10	Crown the Empire	07102010
10	Ensiferum	Thalassic
10	Enuff Z'Nuff	Brainwashed Generation
10	Kiko Loureiro	Open Source
10	Static-X	Project: Regeneration Vol. 1
10	Voivod	The End of Dormancy (EP)
17	Ace Kool	Soy Suficiente (single)
17	Dark Sarah	Grim
17	U.D.O.	We Are One
24	The Acacia Strain	Slow Decay
24	Angband	IV
24	Defeated Sanity	The Sanguinary Impetus
24	Haken	Virus
24	Judicator	Let There Be Nothing
24	Primal Fear	Metal Commando
24	Valkyrie	Fear
31	Alcatrazz	Born Innocent
31	Anneke van Giersbergen	Let the Light In (live album)
31	Dee Snider	For the Love of Metal Live! (live album)
31	Disavowed	Revocation of the Fallen
31	Imperial Triumphant	Alphaville
31	Katalepsy	Terra Mortuus Est
31	Lionheart	The Reality of Miracles
31	Septicflesh	Infernus Sinfonica MMXIX (live album)
31	Upon a Burning Body	Built from War (EP)

=== August ===
Day	Artist	Album
5	Crystal Lake	The Voyages
7	Avatar	Hunter Gatherer
7	Batushka	Раскол/Raskol (EP)
7	Black Crown Initiate	Violent Portraits of Doomed Escape
7	Blue Öyster Cult	45th Anniversary – Live in London (live album)
7	Deep Purple	Whoosh!
7	In Hearts Wake	Kaliyuga
7	Krallice	Mass Cathexis
7	Lord of the Lost	Swan Songs III
7	Messiah	Fatal Grotesque Symbols – Darken Universe (EP)
7	Misery Signals	Ultraviolet
7	Onslaught	Generation Antichrist
7	Steve Von Till	No Wilderness Deep Enough
14	Halestorm	Reimagined (EP)
14	Ingested	Where Only Gods May Tread
14	Kamelot	I Am the Empire – Live from the 013 (live album)
14	Primitive Man	Immersion
21	Buried Alive	Death Will Find You (EP)
21	Hed PE	Class of 2020
21	Incantation	Sect of Vile Divinities
21	Mad Max	Stormchild Rising
21	The Obsessed	Live at Big Dipper (live album)
21	Unleash the Archers	Abyss
21	Vicious Rumors	Celebration Decay
28	Dokken	The Lost Songs: 1978–1981 (compilation album)
28	John Petrucci	Terminal Velocity
28	Metallica	S&M2 (live album)
28	Pain of Salvation	Panther
28	Pig Destroyer	The Octagonal Stairway (EP)
28	Powerman 5000	The Noble Rot
28	Seether	Si Vis Pacem, Para Bellum
28	Shattered Sun	Bled for You
28	Ulver	Flowers of Evil
28	Venom	Sons of Satan (compilation album)
28	Venomous Concept	Politics Versus the Erection

=== September ===
Day	Artist	Album
4	Cloudkicker	Solitude
4	Code Orange	Under the Skin (live album)
4	Humanity's Last Breath	Humanity's Last Breath (Remixed & Remastered)
4	Oceans of Slumber	Oceans of Slumber
4	Stryper	Even the Devil Believes
11	Epica	The Quantum Enigma B-Sides (compilation album)
11	Ihsahn	Pharos (EP)
11	Marilyn Manson	We Are Chaos
11	Mastodon	Medium Rarities (compilation album)
11	Messiah	Fracmont
11	Uniform	Shame
18	Ace Frehley	Origins Vol. 2 (covers album)
18	Derek Sherinian	The Phoenix
18	Finntroll	Vredesvävd
18	Fit for a King	The Path
18	Heathen	Empire of the Blind
18	Napalm Death	Throes of Joy in the Jaws of Defeatism
18	Raven	Metal City
18	StillWell	Supernatural Miracle
23	Ewigkeit	23 (EP)
25	Alpha Wolf	A Quiet Place to Die
25	Ayreon	Transitus
25	Cristian Machado	Hollywood Y Sycamore
25	Deftones	Ohms
25	Hittman	Destroy All Humans
25	Kat	The Last Convoy
25	Kataklysm	Unconquered
25	Obsidian Kingdom	Meat Machine
25	The Ocean	Phanerozoic II: Mesozoic / Cenozoic
25	Svalbard	When I Die, Will I Get Better?

=== October ===
Day	Artist	Album
1	Greg Puciato	Child Soldier: Creator of God
2	Amaranthe	Manifest
2	Anaal Nathrakh	Endarkenment
2	Corey Taylor	CMFT
2	DevilDriver	Dealing with Demons I
2	Enslaved	Utgard
2	Gotthard	Steve Lee – The Eyes of a Tiger: In Memory of Our Unforgotten Friend
2	Iron Angel	Emerald Eyes
2	Nachtblut	Vanitas
2	Silentium	Motiva
2	Six Feet Under	Nightmares of the Decomposed
2	Sumac	May You Be Held
2	Tallah	Matriphagy
9	Blue Öyster Cult	The Symbol Remains
9	Death Angel	Under Pressure (EP)
9	Five Finger Death Punch	A Decade of Destruction, Volume 2 (compilation album)
9	King Parrot	Holed Up in the Lair (EP)
9	Necrophobic	Dawn of the Damned
9	The Unguided	Father Shadow
9	Venom Prison	Primeval
9	Wolves at the Gate	Dawn (EP)
16	Benediction	Scriptures
16	Skálmöld	10 Year Anniversary: Live in Reykjavík (live album)
16	Sons of Otis	Isolation
16	Spirit Adrift	Enlightened in Eternity
16	Tommy Lee	Andro
21	Marty Friedman	Tokyo Jukebox 3
21	Mors Principium Est	Seven
23	Armored Saint	Punching the Sky
23	Earth Groans	Waste (EP)
23	Fever 333	Wrong Generation (EP)
23	HammerFall	Live! Against the World (live album)
23	Leaves' Eyes	The Last Viking
23	Pallbearer	Forgotten Days
23	Raging Speedhorn	Hard to Kill
23	Rusty Eye	Dissecting Shadows
23	Saul	Rise as Equals
23	Sevendust	Blood & Stone
23	Zeal & Ardor	Wake of a Nation (EP)
24	Infectious Grooves	Take U on a Ride (EP)
30	Autopsy	Live in Chicago (live album)
30	Black Stone Cherry	The Human Condition
30	Botanist	Photosynthesis
30	Bring Me the Horizon	Post Human: Survival Horror (EP)
30	Carcass	Despicable (EP)
30	Convulse	Deathstar
30	Draconian	Under a Godless Veil
30	Evildead	United $tate$ of Anarchy
30	I Prevail	Post Traumatic (live album)
30	Ice Nine Kills	I Heard They KILL Live!! (live album)
30	Like Moths to Flames	No Eternity in Gold
30	Mr. Bungle	The Raging Wrath of the Easter Bunny Demo
30	Paleface Swiss	Chapter 3: The Last Selection
30	Stabbing Westward	Hallowed Hymns (EP)
30	Tom Morello	Comandante (EP)
30	Visions of Atlantis	A Symphonic Journey to Remember (live album)
30	Wytch Hazel	III: Pentecost

=== November ===
Day	Artist	Album
6	Black Tusk	Years in Black (compilation album)
6	Celebrity Sex Scandal	The Fundamental
6	Fates Warning	Long Day Good Night
6	Jeff Scott Soto	Wide Awake (In My Dreamland)
6	Lionheart	Live at Summer Breeze (live album)
6	Lords of Black	Alchemy of Souls – Part I
6	Loudblast	Manifesto
6	Sólstafir	Endless Twilight of Codependent Love
7	Jucifer	نظم
12	Mina Caputo	The Mones
13	Intervals	Circadian
13	Jesu	Terminus
13	Katatonia	Dead Air (live album)
13	King 810	AK Concerto No. 47, 11th Movement in G Major
13	L.A. Guns	Renegades
13	Macabre	Carnival of Killers
13	Phil Campbell and the Bastard Sons	We're the Bastards
13	Pyramaze	Epitaph
13	Soulburn	Noa's D'ark
20	Communic	Hiding from the World
20	Contrarian	Only Time Will Tell
20	Dark Tranquillity	Moment
20	Ellefson	No Cover (covers album)
20	Fuck the Facts	Pleine Noirceur
20	Inquisition	Black Mass for a Mass Grave
20	Iron Maiden	Nights of the Dead, Legacy of the Beast: Live in Mexico City (live album)
20	Jinjer	Alive in Melbourne (live album)
20	Killer Be Killed	Reluctant Hero
20	Liturgy	Origin of the Alimonies
20	My Dying Bride	Macabre Cabaret (EP)
20	Nader Sadek	The Serapeum (EP)
20	Thrown into Exile	Illusion of Control
20	Tombs	Under Sullen Skies
27	Azarath	Saint Desecration
27	Cadaver	Edder & Bile
27	Defiance	Checkmate: The Demo Collection (compilation album)
27	Dream Theater	Distant Memories – Live in London (live album)
27	Hatebreed	Weight of the False Self
27	Horse the Band	Your Fault (EP)
27	Morgan Rose	Controlled Chaos (EP)
27	Psycroptic	The Watcher of All (EP)
27	Scour	Black (EP)
27	Sodom	Genesis XIX
27	Within the Ruins	Black Heart

=== December ===
Day	Artist	Album
4	Deafheaven	10 Years Gone (live album)
4	Gama Bomb	Sea Savage
4	Hollywood Undead	New Empire, Vol. 2
4	Iron Mask	Master of Masters
4	Iron Savior	Skycrest
4	Persuader	Necromancy
4	Soilwork	A Whisp of the Atlantic (EP)
9	Wes Borland	The Astral Hand
11	Chris Cornell	No One Sings Like You Anymore, Vol. 1 (covers album)
11	Cro-Mags	2020 (EP)
11	Deeds of Flesh	Nucleus
16	Nocturnal Bloodlust	The Wasteland (EP)
18	A Sound of Thunder	Parallel Eternity
18	Ashes of Ares	Throne of Iniquity (EP)
18	Grayceon	Mothers Weavers Vultures
24	Batushka	Black Liturgy (live album)
24	Papa Roach	20/20 (EP)
25	Hate Forest	Hour of the Centaur
25	Worm Shepherd	In the Wake ov Sòl

Preceded by 2019	Heavy Metal Timeline; 2020	Succeeded by 2021
