= Call Me No One =

American rock band

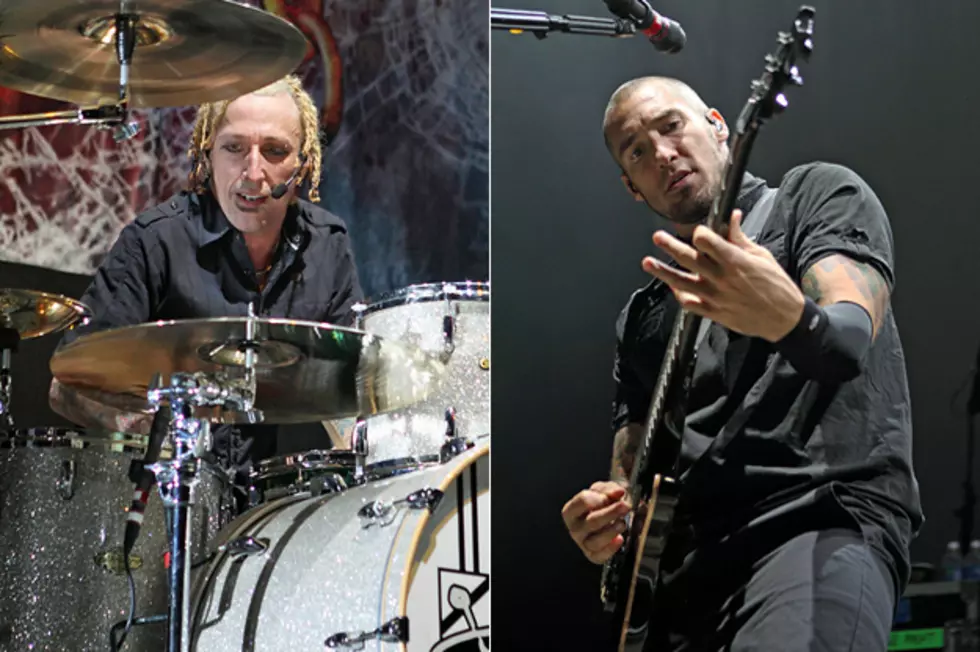

Background information
- Origin: United States
- Genres: Alternative metal; hard rock
- Years active: 2012
- Labels: Asylum, 7 Bros.
- Members: Clint Lowery; Morgan Rose

Call Me No One (sometimes abbreviated as CMNO) was an American rock band founded by Sevendust members Clint Lowery and Morgan Rose in 2012. It was later extended with Rek Mohr (Leo/Hurt) on bass and Souls Harbor guitarist/bassist and Shinedown touring guitarist Alan Price on guitar.

The band entered the studio on January 22, 2012, to begin recording their debut album Last Parade, which was ultimately released on June 5, 2012, via 7 Bros. Records (through a partnership with Asylum). Their first single, "Biggest Fan", was released onto digital media outlets on April 24, 2012. Subsequently, a tour followed in the late summer alongside the bands Nonpoint and Eye Empire.

Talking about the project Lowery has explained that "It all has a dark spooky twist to it; kind of Nine Inch Nails meets Foo Fighters. [...] We felt like it was time to explore a little bit beyond Sevendust.", and also that the sound of the band is "...a lot different from Sevendust, it's hard but it's not the same type of heavy that Sevendust is.".

In 2016, Clint Lowery mentioned that there would be no more Call Me No One, adding that it was a one-time deal.

== Discography ==
=== Studio albums ===
Year	Album details	Peak positions		
Year	Album details	US	US Heatseekers	US Hard Rock
2012	Last Parade: Released: June 5, 2012; Label: Asylum	199	10	19

=== Singles ===
Year	Song	Peak chart positions	Album
Year	Song	US Main.	Album
2012	"Biggest Fan"	37	Last Parade

== Band members ==
- Clint Lowery – vocals, guitars, bass
- Morgan Rose – drums, percussion

Touring musicians

- Rek Mohr – bass
- Alan Price – guitars
