= Michael Kelly Guitars =

Musical instrument company based in Clearwater, Florida, USA

Michael Kelly Guitar Company
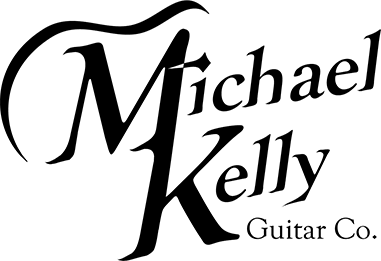
- Company type: Private
- Industry: Musical instruments
- Founded: 1999; 27 years ago
- Founder: Tracy Hoeft
- Headquarters: Clearwater, Florida, United States
- Area served: Worldwide
- Products: Electric and acoustic guitars, basses, acoustic and electric mandolins
- Website: michaelkellyguitars.com

The Michael Kelly Guitar Company is a US musical instrument company founded in 1999 and based in Clearwater, Florida. Michael Kelly imports high quality instruments manufactured to their specifications (mainly from South Korea). The company has recently gained popularity, particularly due to the release of their new Mod Shop Guitars, where they take some of their standard designs and swap out the pickups using Lindy Fralin, Seymour Duncan, TV Jones, Bare Knuckle and Fishman.

Michael Kelly gained popularity due to their Dragonfly II acoustic bass, which has been used by Duff McKagan of Guns N' Roses, Shavo Odadjian of System of a Down, and Tony Bigley of Souls Harbor.

Current line of products commercialised by Michael Kelly includes electric and acoustic guitars, basses, acoustic and electric mandolins.

== Current models ==
=== Electric guitars ===
- Patriot Black
- Patriot Custom
- Patriot Decree
- Patriot Limited
- Patriot Premium
- Patriot Standard
- Patriot Supreme
- Hybrid
- Hybrid Special
- 1950s Model Guitars
- 1960s Model Guitars

=== Acoustic guitars ===
- Forte Port
- Forte Exotic JE
- Koa Special
- Triad 10E
- Triad Port
- Forte Port X
- 3D Grand Auditorium

=== Acoustic basses ===
- Dragonfly 4 String
- Dragonfly 4 String Left Handed
- Dragonfly 5 String
- Dragonfly 4 String Fretless
- Dragonfly 5 String Fretless

=== Electric basses ===
- Element 4Q
- Element 5Q
- Custom Collection Element 4
- Custom Collection Element 5
- Rick Turner B4 Bass

=== Mandolins ===
- A-Style Mandolins
- F-Style Mandolins
- Electric F-Style Mandolins

=== Discontinued electric models ===
- Hex Deluxe
- Valor X #Double-cut#
- Valor Q #Double-cut#
- Valor Limited #Double-cut#
- Valor Custom #Double-cut#
- Hourglass (PRS Santana/Les Paul, Double-cut)
- Vibe #Hollowbody#
- Deuce Phoenix #Hollowbody#
- Phoenix JZ #Hollowbody#
- Patriot Phoenix #Single-cut)
1. vex nv #double cut#
