= Live Again (Sevendust song) =

Single by Sevendust

from the album Animosity
- Released: 2001
- Length: 4:11
- Label: TVT; Festival Mushroom
- Composers: John Connolly; Vinnie Hornsby; Clint Lowery; Morgan Rose; Lajon Witherspoon
- Lyricists: Morgan Rose; John Connolly
- Producer: Ben Grosse

Sevendust singles chronology
| "Praise" (2001) | "Live Again" (2001) | "Angel's Son" (2002) |

Music video
- "Live Again" on YouTube

"Live Again" is a song by the American rock band Sevendust. It was released as the second single from their third studio album, Animosity (2001). The song peaked at No. 21 and No. 36 on Billboard's Mainstream Rock and Modern Rock Tracks charts, respectively.

== Music video ==
The music video for "Live Again" was directed by Noble Jones. The video concerns a girl who gets thrown out of her house by her father, who pushes her out the front door as her mother and neighbors stand by watching.

"I've always been fascinated and disturbed by young people and children that get thrown to the street," drummer Morgan Rose said. "The video deals with this girl dealing with the fact that she doesn't have any money or food and there are always pig guys out there that are looking to do something terrible to somebody that's down."

The girl's not alone in her quest for survival. During the video, another woman appears to guide her away from trouble. "She acts as almost a guardian angel," Rose said. "Some people might take it in a religious way and other people might see it more as a spiritual thing. But it's really just about looking for somebody, not knowing where to find that person and needing help, and that person being available if you had just asked."

The band was filmed in an old, empty theater, and there are photo images in the background of the girl, the angel, the father and the lecherous antagonists. "As we're playing, the camera goes around the pictures, and then the still photos turn into real life," Rose said.

== Track listing ==
| No. | Title | Length |
|---|---|---|
| 1. | "Live Again" |
| 2. | "Angel's Son" (live) |
| 3. | "Denial" (live) |

== Charts ==
| Chart (2002) | Peak position |
|---|---|
| US Alternative Airplay (Billboard) | 36 |
| US Mainstream Rock (Billboard) | 21 |
