= Torn & Burnt =

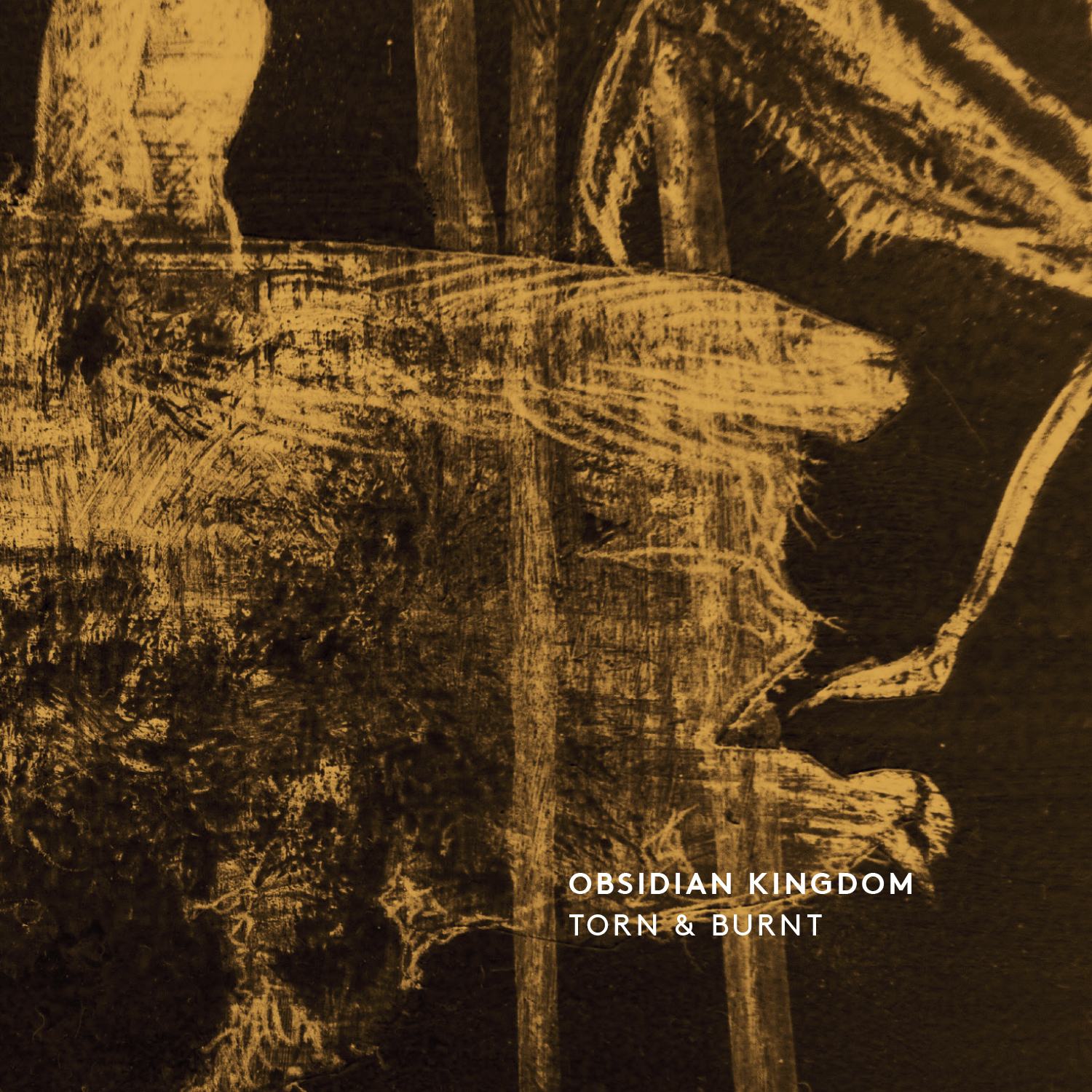

Remix album by Obsidian Kingdom
- Released: November 15, 2013
- Genre: IDM, dubstep, industrial music
- Length: 32:25

Torn & Burnt – The Mantiis Remixes (2013) is an album by the Barcelonian band Obsidian Kingdom that contains remixes of seven cuts from its previous release, Mantiis, produced by various electronic music artists - Oktopus (Dälek), Subheim, Poordream, Drumcorps, Larvae, Mothboy, Necro Deathmort and Jr Morgue, many of them signed to the independent German label Ad Noiseam -. The design of the physical edition, looked after by Tomeu Mullet, is based on an original artwork by Belgian taxidermist Raf Veulemans.

== Reception ==
The album receives good reviews that praise its unexpected combination of metal and electronic music. It is proposed that the remixes have their own unique entity while remaining true to the original songs and even reaching the point of surpassing them in some cases.

== Track listing ==
No.	Title	Length
1.	"And Then It Was (Oktopus Remix)"	5:00
2.	"Last Of The Light (Subheim Vs Poordream Remix)"	5:05
3.	"Awake Until Dawn (Necro Deathmort Remix)"	5:32
4.	"Fingers In Anguish (Jr Morgue Remix)"	1:12
5.	"Haunts Of The Underworld (Drumcorps Remix)"	3:45
6.	"The Nurse (Larvae Remix)"	3:53
7.	"Answers Revealing (Mothboy Remix)"	7:58
