= Last Parade (album) =

Studio album by Call Me No One
- Released: June 5, 2012
- Recorded: January 2012 – March 2012
- Studio: Architekt Music in Butler, New Jersey
- Genres: Hard rock, alternative metal
- Length: 44:26
- Label: Asylum

Singles from Last Parade
- 1. "Biggest Fan" Released: April 24, 2012; 2. "Thunderbird" Released: August 7, 2012

Professional ratings
Review scores
Source	Rating
Artistdirect.com	4.5/5 stars
Loudwire.com	4/5 stars
PopMatters.com	7/10 stars
Type3media.com	8/10 stars
Unsungmelody.com	9/10 stars

Last Parade is the only studio album by American hard rock band Call Me No One. The album was recorded and mixed at Architekt Music in Butler, New Jersey and it was released on June 5, 2012. The album is to be on 7Bros. record company, with Asylum as a distributor.

== Recording and production ==
The album was recorded and mixed at Architekt Music in Butler, New Jersey. During an interview with Loudwire.com Lowery says about the album "Me and Morgan are writing and recording it, we have a really good team with us. It's a lot different from Sevendust, it's hard but it's not the same type of heavy that Sevendust is and we're really excited about it. Then he added "it's gonna be on the same label that releases Sevendust, the 7 Bros. record company, with Asylum as a distributor. It's really cool; we've wanted this opportunity to do something different, it's exciting to finally have the opportunity to do this. The band launched their official website with a new design to promote the album. They also posted some videos on YouTube showing how the album was created. On May 14 a clip of track titled "War Song" was released. Plus the band streamed a clip of title track "Last Parade" on various internet websites. Prior to the album's release, Lowery released videos of himself discussing preview clips from the album.

== Reception ==
Last Parade has received positive reviews from critics. Writing for Sputnikmusic, Rick Florino said that Last Parade "illuminates just how dynamic and diverse Clint Lowery and Morgan Rose truly are." Chris Colgan of Popmatters wrote "Lowery's singing style is the perfect fit for Call Me No One, filling out the sound in a way that virtually no other singer could." Loudwire gave the album 4 out of 5, stating, "Clint Lowery and Morgan Rose have created a piece of work that is far different from Sevendust but is powerful all on its own. Their hard work, frustration and passion can all be heard throughout the album."

== Track listing ==
All tracks are written by Call Me No One.

No.	Title	Length
1.	"Intro"	1:30
2.	"The World Is Dead"	3:18
3.	"Thunderbird"	3:48
4.	"Soapbox"	3:52
5.	"Hillbilly"	3:42
6.	"All's Well"	5:15
7.	"Biggest Fan"	2:50
8.	"Pleased to Meet You"	3:21
9.	"Broken Record"	4:56
10.	"You Surprise Me"	3:57
11.	"War Song"	3:27
12.	"Last Parade"	4:35
Total length:		44:26

Deluxe edition
No.	Title	Length
13.	"Whatever Happened"	4:05
14.	"Time Machine"	4:09
Total length:		52:41

== Personnel ==
=== Call Me No One ===
- Clint Lowery – vocals, guitars, bass
- Morgan Rose – drums, percussions

=== Additional personnel ===
- Kurt Wubbenhorst – additional bass, programming
- Dante Portella – banjo
- George Roskos – executive producer
- Mike Ferretti – engineer, mixing
- Johnny Fantozzi – assistant engineer
- Ted Jensen – mastering
- Jeremy Adamos – photography
- Douglas Mackenzie – photography
- Andrea Smith – design
- Blake Plonsky – drum technician

== Charts ==
Chart (2012)	Peak position
U.S. Billboard 200	199
U.S. Billboard Top Heatseekers Albums	10
U.S. Billboard Top Hard Rock Albums	19
