= Choices (EP) =

EP by Hello Demons...meet Skeletons
- Released: October 22, 2013
- Recorded: July 2013 Recorded and Mixed at Architekt Music in Butler, New Jersey
- Genre: Acoustic rock, hard rock
- Length: 31:05
- Label: Architekt Music

Hello Demons...meet Skeletons chronology
Uncomfortable Silence (2011)	Choices (2013)

Choices is fourth and last solo EP by American musician and songwriter, Clint Lowery (under the name Hello Demons...Meet Skeletons). It was released on October 22, 2013. As well as the EP, Lowery is also releasing a limited edition deluxe of the complete HDMS series. The EP was preceded by the song, "Caved In," which was released in SoundCloud.com in September 2013.

== Writing and production ==
Clint Lowery during an interview talked about sound of new album, described "It’s a lot like the Call Me No One project, mostly electric. Harder at times, but overall pretty chill in a sense. I think we covered such major ground on it." The album's instrumental and programming work was recorded at Architekt Music in Butler, NJ.

== Track listing ==
All tracks are written by Clint Lowery.

No.	Title	Length
1.	"I Give Up"	4:22
2.	"Better Half"	4:32
3.	"Caved In"	5:43
4.	"Expectations"	4:32
5.	"Your Ghost"	3:18
6.	"The Curtain Burns" (contains hidden track "Walkin' the Streets At Night", starting at 5:05)	8:37
Total length:		31:05

== Personnel ==
- Clint Lowery - Vocals, Guitar, Bass, Drums, Producer
- Mike Ferretti - Mixing
- Kurt Wubbenhorst - Composer, Additional Bass, Additional Drums, Programming
- Alex Goldenthal - Composer, Guitar solo on "The Curtain Burns"
- Recorded and Mixed at Architekt Music in Butler, New Jersey
- Jill Colbert - Artwork
