= Hunted (album) =

Studio album by Khemmis
- Released: October 21, 2016
- Genre: Doom metal
- Length: 43:48
- Label: 20 Buck Spin

Khemmis chronology
| Absolution (2015) | Hunted (2016) | Desolation (2018) |

Hunted is the second studio album by American doom metal band Khemmis. It was released on October 21, 2016 by the label 20 Buck Spin. The album received critical acclaim and was named the 11th-best metal album of 2016 by Rolling Stone.

== Track listing ==
| No. | Title | Length |
|---|---|---|
| 1. | "Above the Water" | 7:22 |
| 2. | "Candlelight" | 7:19 |
| 3. | "Three Gates" | 6:37 |
| 4. | "Beyond the Door" | 9:00 |
| 5. | "Hunted" | 13:30 |
| Total length: | | 43:48 |
