= Animosity (Sevendust album) =

Studio album by Sevendust
- Released: November 13, 2001
- Recorded: 2001
- Genres: Nu metal; alternative metal
- Length: 55:39
- Label: TVT
- Producers: Ben Grosse; Sevendust (co.)

Sevendust chronology
| Home (1999) | Animosity (2001) | Seasons (2003) |

Singles from Animosity
- 1. "Praise" Released: October 21, 2001; 2. "Live Again" Released: April 9, 2002; 3. "Angel's Son" Released: May 24, 2002; 4. "Xmas Day" Released: 2002

European cover

Professional ratings
Review scores
| Source | Rating |
|---|---|
| AllMusic | 2.5/5 stars |
| Blender | 3/5 stars |
| Entertainment Weekly | C |
| Rolling Stone | 2/5 stars |
| Ultimate Guitar | 8.4 stars on a 10 point scale |

Animosity is the third studio album by the American rock band Sevendust, released on November 13, 2001, through TVT Records. The album appeared on the Billboard 200, remained there for thirteen weeks and peaked at 28 on December 1, 2001. It was certified gold on March 11, 2002 by the Recording Industry Association of America.

Sevendust released five variations of the album. Two variations were released in the United States with thirteen tracks, one version with explicit lyrics and the other with censored lyrics. Another explicit lyric version was released in the United States with a bonus track, and another censored version was released with two bonus tracks. The China release featured fifteen tracks. Four singles were released from the album, all of which appeared on the mainstream and modern Billboard charts.

"T.O.A.B." (Tits on a Boar) was featured in the computer animation Galerians: Rion.

"Angel's Son" is a tribute to Lynn Strait, former lead-singer of the band Snot. Strait died in a car accident on December 11, 1998, at the age of 30.

== Track listing ==
All music is composed by Sevendust

| No. | Title | Lyrics | Length |
|---|---|---|---|
| 1. | "T.O.A.B." | Morgan Rose | 3:39 |
| 2. | "Praise" | Rose, Clint Lowery, Lajon Witherspoon | 3:38 |
| 3. | "Trust" | Lowery, Witherspoon | 5:14 |
| 4. | "Crucified" | Rose, John Connolly | 4:13 |
| 5. | "Xmas Day" | Lowery | 5:14 |
| 6. | "Dead Set" | Lowery, Witherspoon, Rose | 4:59 |
| 7. | "Shine" | Witherspoon | 3:43 |
| 8. | "Follow" (featuring Aaron Lewis of Staind) | Connolly | 4:33 |
| 9. | "Damaged" | Connolly, Rose | 4:34 |
| 10. | "Live Again" | Rose, Connolly | 4:11 |
| 11. | "Beautiful" | Lowery, Witherspoon, Rose | 4:11 |
| 12. | "Redefine" | Rose, Lowery, Witherspoon | 3:41 |
| 13. | "Angel's Son" | Lowery, Witherspoon | 3:49 |
| Total length: | | | 55:39 |

Bonus release (clean)
| No. | Title | Length |
|---|---|---|
| 14. | "Angel's Son" (live) | 4:12 |
| 15. | "Black" (live) | 5:40 |

Bonus release (explicit)
| No. | Title | Length |
|---|---|---|
| 14. | "Angel's Son" (live) |

Chinese release
| No. | Title | Length |
|---|---|---|
| 14. | "Denial" (live) |
| 15. | "Angel's Son" (live) |

B-sides
| No. | Title | Lyrics | Length |
|---|---|---|---|
| 14. | "Leech" (released on the Freddy vs. Jason soundtrack) | | 4:30 |
| 15. | "Corrected" (released on The Scorpion King soundtrack) | Witherspoon, Connolly, Lowery, Rose | 4:31 |

== Personnel ==
Sevendust

- Lajon Witherspoon – lead vocals
- Clint Lowery – lead guitar, backing vocals, co-lead vocals on "Xmas Day" and "Angel's Son"
- John Connolly – rhythm guitar, backing vocals
- Vinnie Hornsby – bass
- Morgan Rose – drums, backing vocals

Additional musicians

- Blumpy – additional keyboards, programming
- Ben Grosse – programming
- Aaron Lewis – additional vocals on "Follow"
- Luis Resto – strings and keyboards on "Xmas Day"
- Justin Z. Walden – additional keyboards, programming

Production and management

- Tony Adams – drum technician
- Orville Almon Jr. – legal representation
- Chuck Bailey – assistant engineer
- Tom Baker – mastering
- Adam Barber – digital recording and editing
- Rick Behrens – assistant engineer
- Blumpy – digital recording and editing
- Jeff Cameron – executive producer, management
- Norm Costa – drum technician
- Toby Dearborn – assistant engineer
- Ken Fermaglich – U.S. booking
- Jay Jay French – executive producer
- Steve Gottlieb – executive producer
- Matthew Grasse – photography
- Ben Grosse – producer, engineer, mixing, digital recording and editing
- Jeff Hanson – executive producer, management
- Robert Hannon – assistant engineer
- David Johnson – business management
- Jeff McAlear – assistant engineer
- Brent Mullins – guitar technician
- Michelle Oakes – A&R coordination
- David "Bull" Parrish – guitar technician
- Di Quon – A&R administration
- Sean Roberts – A&R direction
- Sevendust – co-producer
- Thad Thompson – merchandising
- Dan Tremonti – cover art & design
- Alex Uyochocde – assistant engineer
- Neil Warnock – worldwide booking
- Garry Whitfield – business management

== Charts ==
=== Album ===
Chart performance for Animosity
| Chart (2001) | Peak position |
|---|---|
| Australian Albums (ARIA) | 34 |
| New Zealand Albums (RMNZ) | 26 |
| US Billboard 200 | 28 |

=== Singles ===
| Year | Song | Chart | Position | Ref. |
|---|---|---|---|---|
| 2001 | "Praise" | Mainstream Rock Tracks | 15 | |
| 2001 | "Praise" | Modern Rock Tracks | 23 | |
| 2002 | "Angel's Son" | Mainstream Rock Tracks | 11 | |
| 2002 | "Angel's Son" | Modern Rock Tracks | 15 | |
| 2002 | "Live Again" | Mainstream Rock Tracks | 21 | |
| 2002 | "Live Again" | Modern Rock Tracks | 36 | |
| 2002 | "Xmas Day" | Mainstream Rock Tracks | 38 | |

== Certifications ==
| Region | Certification | Certified units/sales |
|---|---|---|
| United States (RIAA) | Gold | 500,000^{^} |
^{^} Shipments figures based on certification alone.

== Release history ==
| Region | Date | Label | Format | Catalog | Ref. |
|---|---|---|---|---|---|
| United States | 2001 | TVT | CD (Clean) | 5873 | |
| United States | 2001 | TVT | CD (Explicit) | 5870 | |
| United States | 2001 | TVT | CS (Explicit) | 5870 | |
| China | 2002 | Dream On | CD (Explicit) | 7008 | |
| United States | 2002 | Dream On | CD (Explicit) | DOR-7008 | |
| United States | 2003 | Island | CD (Bonus Track) | 9800090 | |
| United States | 2003 | Universal Distribution | CD (Clean Bonus Track) | CID8132 | |
