= Meat Machine (album) =

MEAT MACHINE

Studio album by Obsidian Kingdom
- Released: September 25, 2020
- Recorded: Summer 2019 at Ax Studios, Barcelona
- Genre: industrial rock, post-metal, experimental rock, electronica, sludge metal
- Length: 47:38
- Label: Season of Mist
- Producer: Jorge Mur

Obsidian Kingdom chronology
A Year With No Summer (2016)	MEAT MACHINE (2020)

MEAT MACHINE is the third studio album by Barcelona-based band Obsidian Kingdom. It features ten songs that draw from a diverse range of styles including experimental rock, industrial rock, post-metal, sludge and electronica. The album was released by Season of Mist on September 25, 2020, with artwork designed by Elena Gallen and Ritxi Ostáriz.

The release received generally favorable reviews from critics worldwide, who praised its variety and unpredictability. With regard to its experimental value, Trent Bos from Heavy Blog is Heavy wrote that "Metal needs bands to continue to push the boundaries of what it can be, and that’s exactly what MEAT MACHINE has accomplished".

== Style ==
MEAT MACHINE is noted for creatively combining a wide range of disparate styles and influences, its clear and aggressive production and the creation of cinematic atmospheres with disturbing undertones. Regarding the combination of ambiance and violence, Sophie Maugan from Metal Hammer wrote that "the songs are equally immersive and destined to enthrall anyone with a penchant for altered states and arse-shattering riffs".

It is also the first time that the band uses female vocals, sung by guitarist Eaten Roll I, in contrast with Rider G Omega's death growls.

== Production ==
Initially, the band intended for MEAT MACHINE to be an electronic album. One year before the recording, the band handed the album demo to producer Jorge Mur, who rejected the material due to finding it uninteresting, which led the band to re-write the whole work.

The album was recorded, mixed, and produced in the summer of 2019 by Jorge Mur at Ax Studios in Barcelona, and co-produced by Mr Ax and the band itself. It was mastered by Magnus Lindberg at Redmont Studio in Stockholm in November 2019.

Shortly before the end of the recording, guitarist Eaten Roll I decided to leave the band due to internal tensions.

== Critical reception ==
Professional ratings
Review scores
Source	Rating
Metal Hammer	3.5/5 stars
Mondo Sonoro	9/10 stars
Metal1.info	9/10 stars
Distorted Sound	9/10 stars

MEAT MACHINE was met with positive reviews that highlighted its weirdness and its replayability in spite of its demanding production. But the trait that was most often brought into focus was its eclecticism – while most reviewers found the mix of styles to be bold and enticing, others thought it to be incoherent and confusing. In this respect, Langdon Hickman from Consequence of Sound wrote that "Obsidian Kingdom are a band that feels like they can syncretistically alloy anything under the sun".

In December 2020, Mondo Sonoro declared MEAT MACHINE the "Best Spanish Metal Album" of 2020.

== Track listing ==
All tracks are written by Obsidian Kingdom.

No.	Title	Length
1.	"THE EDGE"	3:55
2.	"THE PUMP"	4:24
3.	"MR PAN"	5:38
4.	"NAKED POLITICS"	4:05
5.	"FLESH WORLD"	6:15
6.	"MEAT STAR"	4:41
7.	"SPANKER"	4:18
8.	"VOGUE"	3:41
9.	"WOMB OF WIRE"	5:16
10.	"A FOE"	5:26
Total length:		47:38

== Personnel ==
Obsidian Kingdom

- Rider G Omega – guitar and vocals
- Ojete Mordaza II – drums
- Om Rex Orale – bass
- Eaten Roll I – guitar and vocals
- Jade Riot Cul – keyboards

Other personnel

- Jorge Mur – bowed guitars and microwave sounds
