= Biggest Fan (Call Me No One song) =

Single by Call Me No One

from the album Last Parade
- Released: April 24, 2012
- Recorded: January 2012–March 2012 Recorded and Mixed at Architekt Music in Butler, New Jersey
- Genre: Hard rock, alternative metal
- Length: 2:50
- Label: Asylum, 7 Bros.
- Songwriter: Clint Lowery
- Producer: Call Me No One

Call Me No One singles chronology
"Biggest Fan" (2012)	"Thunderbird" (2012)

"Biggest Fan" is a song by American hard rock band Call Me No One. It is the first single from their debut album Last Parade. It was released onto digital media outlets on April 24, 2012.

== Song meaning ==
Clint Lowery in an interview with theaquarian.com explained the story behind of the song:

"The song was just basically, you know, about observational topics. It's based on what I see in a lot of musicians and a lot of singers. They're all kind of self-absorbed, not just musicians, but people in entertainment, actors, and people who are kind of put on a pedestal of any kind. They start to believe that they really are special and are above other people, so it's just kind of my whole jab at that. It's about people who are just completely involved with themselves and look at themselves as being above others. That was just the spark, the inspiration, that people just get this ego that takes over their lives".

== Reception ==
Liz Ramanand from Loudwire gave the song 3.5/5, stating that "With crushing drum patterns, blistering guitar riffs and a serious solo, 'Biggest Fan' is going to pound your ear drums. Right out of the gate Lowery croons, There’s nothing worse than a hero / Condescending believer, creating an anthem to keep arrogant, egotistical chumps in check and also the chorus is bound to get stuck in your head.

== Charts ==
Chart (2012)	Peak position
US Mainstream Rock (Billboard)	37
US Active Rock (Billboard)	31
