= Truth Killer =

Studio album by Sevendust
- Released: July 28, 2023
- Studio: Studio Barbarosa (Gotha, Florida)
- Genre: Alternative metal; hard rock; nu metal
- Length: 49:47
- Label: Napalm
- Producer: Michael "Elvis" Baskette

Sevendust chronology
Blood & Stone (2020)	Truth Killer (2023)	One (2026)

Singles from Truth Killer
- 1. "Everything" Released: May 11, 2023

Truth Killer is the fourteenth studio album by the American rock band Sevendust. It was released on July 28, 2023. The song "Everything" was issued as the lead single from the album ahead of its release.

== Writing and recording ==
The band again chose to work with music producer Michael "Elvis" Baskette on the album, which marks his third collaboration with the band. The album was described as the band sticking to their established sound while adding additional electronic sounds into the mix. The song "Superficial Drug" provides a critique of modern social media.

== Release and promotion ==
The album was first announced in April 2023. Its announcement was coupled with the release one of the album's promotional singles, "Fence", and an accompanying claymation music video.

== Reception ==
The album was generally well received by critics. Metal Injection gave the album an 8/10 review score, praising it for being "focused and streamlined with plenty of catchy songs and a few surprises." Blabbermouth similarly gave it an 8/10 score, concluding that while its "not super varied or diverse" it is still "well-written and exquisitely executed" and that "even though they're 14 albums in, they aren't watering anything down, and they have much more music in them." Wall of Sound agreed with the sentiment in their own 8/10 review, stating that "with album 14 Truth Killer, they sound just as inspired and creatively juiced up as ever".

In 2024, Loudwire staff elected it as the best hard rock album of 2023.

== Track listing ==
All tracks are written by Sevendust.

Truth Killer track listing
No.	Title	Length
1.	"I Might Let the Devil Win"	4:27
2.	"Truth Killer"	3:43
3.	"Won't Stop the Bleeding"	4:04
4.	"Everything"	4:18
5.	"No Revolution"	3:47
6.	"Sick Mouth"	3:38
7.	"Holy Water"	3:56
8.	"Leave Hell Behind"	4:42
9.	"Superficial Drug"	4:33
10.	"Messenger"	4:03
11.	"Love and Hate"	4:52
12.	"Fence"	3:37
Total length:		49:47

== Personnel ==
=== Sevendust ===
- Lajon Witherspoon – lead vocals
- Clint Lowery – lead guitar, co-lead vocals on “Leave Hell Behind” and "Love and Hate", backing vocals, programming
- John Connolly – rhythm guitar, backing vocals
- Vinnie Hornsby – bass, backing vocals
- Morgan Rose – drums, backing vocals

=== Production and design ===
- Michael "Elvis" Baskette – production, mixing (tracks 2–12)
- Jef Moll – engineering, digital editing
- Josh Saldate – assistant engineer
- Richard Wicander – mixing (track 1)
- Brad Blackwood – mastering
- Ryan Clark – art direction, design
- Jeremiah Scott – artwork photography
- Chuck Brueckmann – band photography

== Charts ==
Chart performance for Truth Killer
Chart (2023)	Peak position
Swiss Albums (Schweizer Hitparade)	58
UK Album Downloads (OCC)	62
UK Independent Album Breakers (OCC)	14
UK Rock & Metal Albums (OCC)	23
US Billboard 200	80
US Top Hard Rock Albums (Billboard)	3
US Top Rock Albums (Billboard)	11
