= A Year With No Summer =

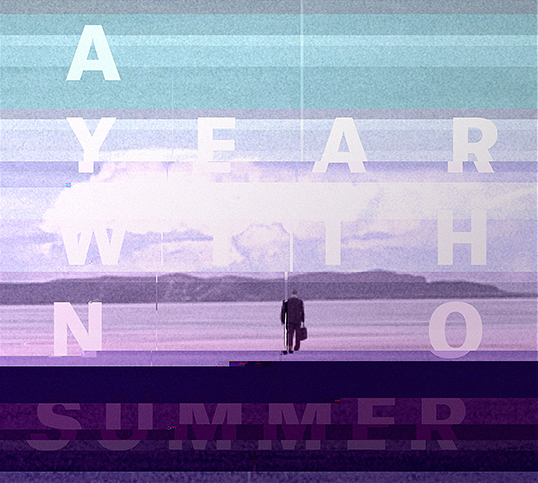

Studio album by Obsidian Kingdom
- Released: March 11, 2016
- Recorded: September 2015 at Orgone Studios, London
- Genre: Progressive metal, post-metal, post-rock
- Length: 43:12
- Label: Season of Mist
- Producer: Jaime Gomez Arellano

Obsidian Kingdom chronology
Mantiis (2012)	A Year With No Summer (2016)	Meat Machine (2020)

A Year With No Summer is the second studio album by Barcelona-based band Obsidian Kingdom. It is a concept album featuring seven songs that draw from a diverse range of styles including alternative rock, drone, black metal, progressive rock, post-metal and electronica. The album was recorded, mixed, mastered and produced in September 2015 by Jaime Gómez Arellano at Orgone Studios in London, and co-produced by Jorge Mur and the band itself.

The album was released by Season of Mist on March 11, 2016, with artwork designed by Ritxi Ostáriz and Elena Gallen. A different cover was created for each of the different physical formats, all of them presenting a different glitch variation on an original picture by French photographer Mathieu Bernard-Reymond. The release received generally favorable reviews from critics, who praised its complexity and gloomy sound.

A Year With No Summer features the collaboration of Ulver's singer Kristoffer Rygg in the song "10th April" and Mayhem's Attila Csihar in "The Kandinsky Group". The digipak and jewelcase editions feature a hidden track that consist of a stripped-down bossanova rendition of the track "Darkness" by Jr Morgue.

== Style ==
A Year With No Summer is noted for featuring a much different sound approach than the band's debut Mantiis (especially in the vocal field, with a register often compared to that of Genesis' Peter Gabriel and Phil Collins), however retaining its variety and difficult classification. The critics also pointed out the decrement of extreme metal resources such as blast beats and death growls in favor of a more accessible sound.

In respect of the wide range of styles and genres displayed in the album, Loudwire wrote that "A Year Without Summer will appeal to fans of My Bloody Valentine, Pharmakon and Cult of Luna. Not any of them — all three."

== Critical reception ==
Professional ratings
Review scores
Source	Rating
Angry Metal Guy	4/5 stars
Heavy Blog is Heavy	3.5/5 stars
Metal Hammer	6/10 stars
Terrorizer	4/5 stars

A Year With No Summer was met with positive reviews that highlighted its general aura of disenchantment and resignation, its thematic depth, and the bold shift in style from the band's debut, while a few critics found this turn to feel bland and disappointing. Regarding Obsidian Kingdom's sophomore's apparent softening, PROG stated that "Boiled down to easy-to-swallow essentials, there’s a mainstream and very marketable album in here just bursting to get out."

== Track listing ==
All tracks are written by Obsidian Kingdom

No.	Title	Length
1.	"A Year With No Summer"	6:25
2.	"10th April"	4:48
3.	"Darkness"	7:08
4.	"The Kandinsky Group"	10:31
5.	"The Polyarnik"	2:41
6.	"Black Swan"	4:10
7.	"Away/Absent"	7:25

== Personnel ==
Obsidian Kingdom

- Rider G Omega – guitar and vocals
- Ojete Mordaza II – drums
- Zer0 Æmeour Íggdrasil – keyboards and vocals
- Seerborn Ape Tot – guitar
- Om Rex Orale – bass

Other personnel

- Kristoffer Rygg – vocals in "10th April"
- Attila Csihar – vocals in "The Kandinsky Group"
- Jr Morgue – guest appearance in "Darkness (reprise)"
