= Khemmis (band) =

American doom metal band

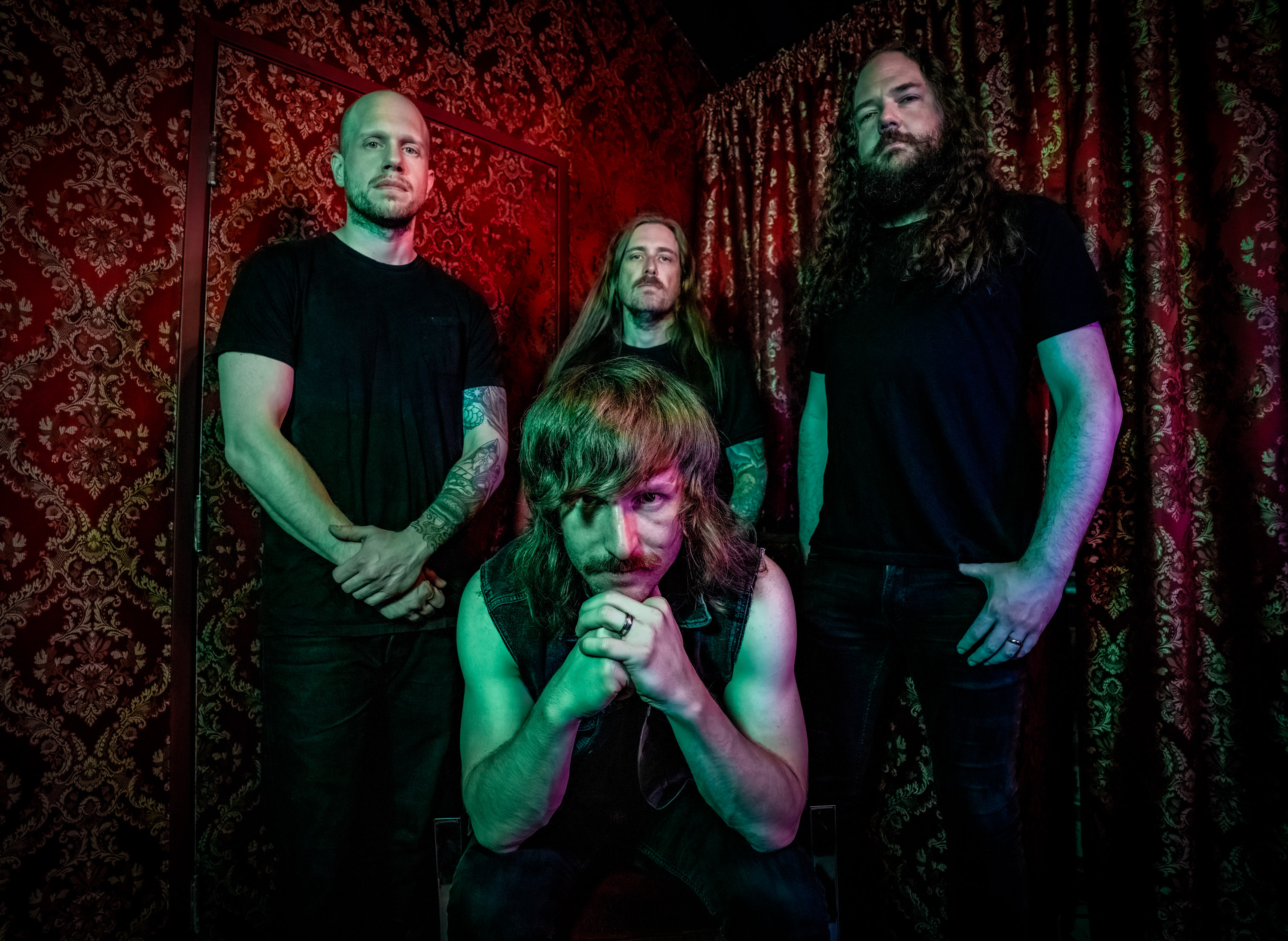
- Khemmis in 2024

Background information
- Origin: Denver, Colorado, U.S.
- Genres: Doom metal, epic doom metal
- Years active: 2012–present
- Labels: 20 Buck Spin, Nuclear Blast
- Members: Zach Coleman; Phil Pendergast; Ben Hutcherson; David Small
- Past members: Daniel Beiers; Dan Barnett
- Website: khemmisdoom.com

Khemmis is an American doom metal band from Denver, Colorado, that formed in 2012. The band's music combines doom and traditional heavy metal with elements of death and black metal. The band released their first two studio albums, Absolution and Hunted, through independent label 20 Buck Spin. Their third album, Desolation, and subsequent mini-LP, Doomed Heavy Metal, were licensed for all territories outside of North America by Nuclear Blast and were co-released with 20 Buck Spin. In November 2021, the band released their Nuclear Blast worldwide debut record Deceiver. They are named after an ancient city located in Egypt, now known as Akhmim.

== History ==
Khemmis was formed in 2012 after guitarist Ben Hutcherson moved to Colorado to pursue a doctorate at the University of Colorado.

The band recorded their debut album, Absolution, with producer/engineer Dave Otero. It was released by 20 Buck Spin on July 7, 2015, and was ranked 9th on Decibel Magazine's Top 40 Albums of 2015.

Their second studio album, Hunted, arrived in October 2016. It was ranked 11th on Rolling Stone′s 20 best metal albums of 2016, 1st on Decibel magazine's Top 40 Albums of 2016, 7th on PopMatters' Best Metal of 2016, and 6th on Consequence of Sound's Top 10 Metal Albums of 2016.

In July 2017, the band announced that they had signed to Nuclear Blast (via licensing deal with 20 Buck Spin) for the release of their third album, Desolation.

The band began touring regularly in support of the record. They toured North America alongside Enslaved, Wolves in the Throne Room, and Myrkur as part of the 2018 Decibel Magazine Tour. They also made their European debut with performances at the Roadburn and Doom Over Leipzig festivals.

They released their third album, Desolation, on June 22, 2018, on 20 Buck Spin (North America) and Nuclear Blast (all other regions). The album was ranked 9th on Decibel Magazine's Top 40 Albums of 2018 and 12th on Consequence of Sound's Top 25 Metal + Rock Albums of 2018.

In February 2019, the band announced that they had signed a worldwide deal with Nuclear Blast.

In August 2019, the band's cover of "A Conversation with Death", previously only available on the 2017 split 7" with Spirit Adrift entitled Fraught with Peril, was featured in the video game series The Dark Pictures Anthology.

In 2019, the band completed two headlining American tours—a summer East Coast/Midwest tour with support from Cloak and a West Coast tour with support from Un—as well as a European tour with German doom metal band Iron Walrus.

Khemmis released Doomed Heavy Metal, a collection of rarities, live tracks, and a newly recorded cover of Ronnie James Dio's "Rainbow in the Dark", on April 17, 2020. The mini-LP was co-released by 20 Buck Spin and Nuclear Blast.

In 2020, they released a cover of "Down in a Hole" by Alice in Chains as part of Magnetic Eye Records' Dirt (Redux).

Prior to their livestreamed appearance at Decibel Magazine's “200th Issue Extremely Ex-Stream” in April 2021, the band announced that original bassist Dan Beiers had left the band in December 2020. This was the band's first performance with David Small handling live bass duties.

The band released Deceiver, their fourth studio album overall and their first worldwide release on Nuclear Blast, on November 19, 2021. The record was ranked 2nd on Decibel Magazine's Top 40 Albums of 2021. Following the release, the band announced a spring North American tour supporting Mastodon and Opeth.

On October 1, 2022, the band confirmed that David Small had joined as their permanent bassist.

On April 28, 2023, the band released their EP, Where the Cold Wind Blows, ahead of their spring headlining tour "Deceiver North America MMXXIII" with support from bands Conjurer and Wake.

On April 9, 2026, the band announced their self-titled fifth album, which was released on June 12.

== Members ==
=== Current ===
- Zach Coleman – drums
- Phil Pendergast – guitar, vocals
- Ben Hutcherson – guitar, vocals
- David Small – bass (2022–present; live member 2021–2022)
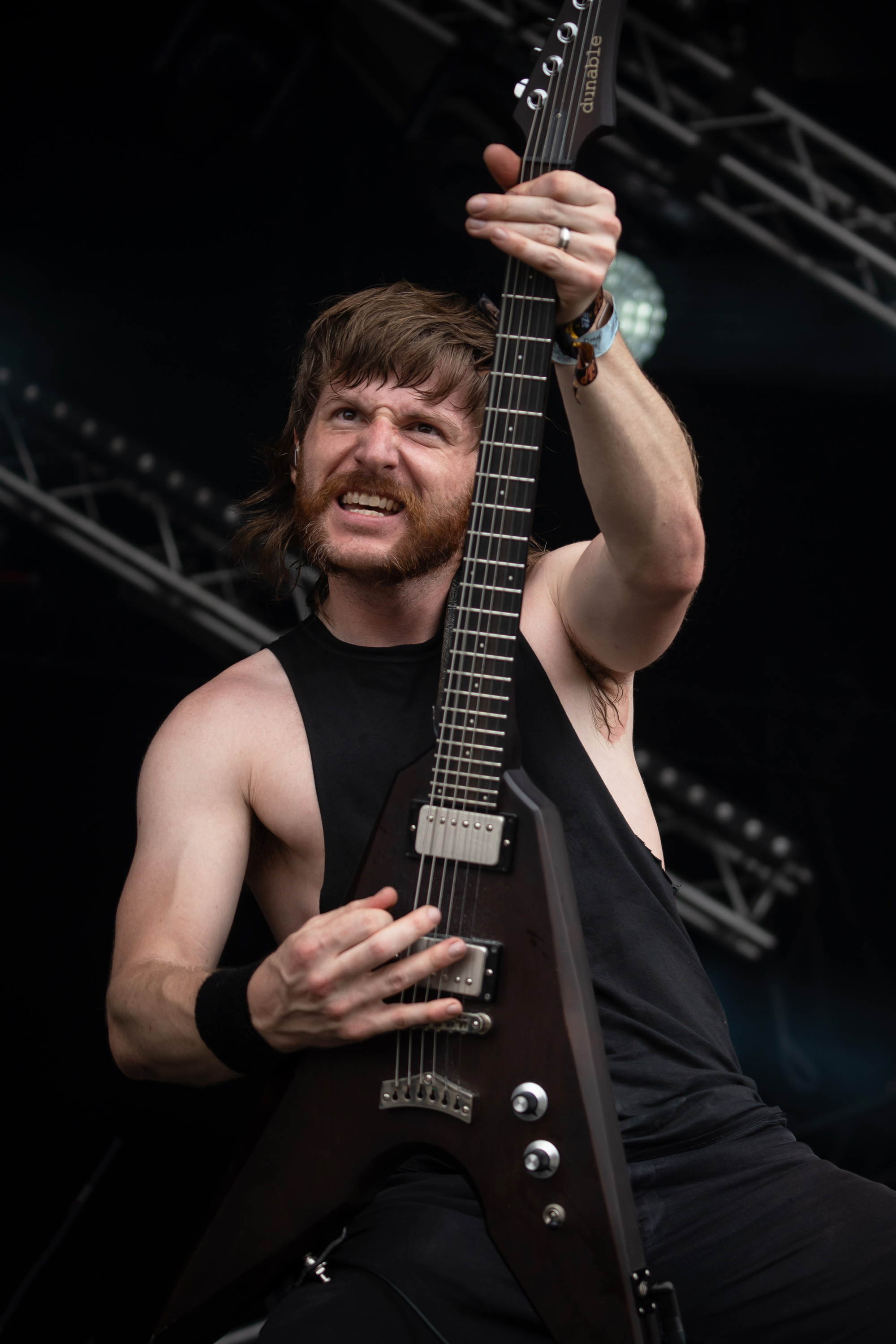
Phil Pendergast

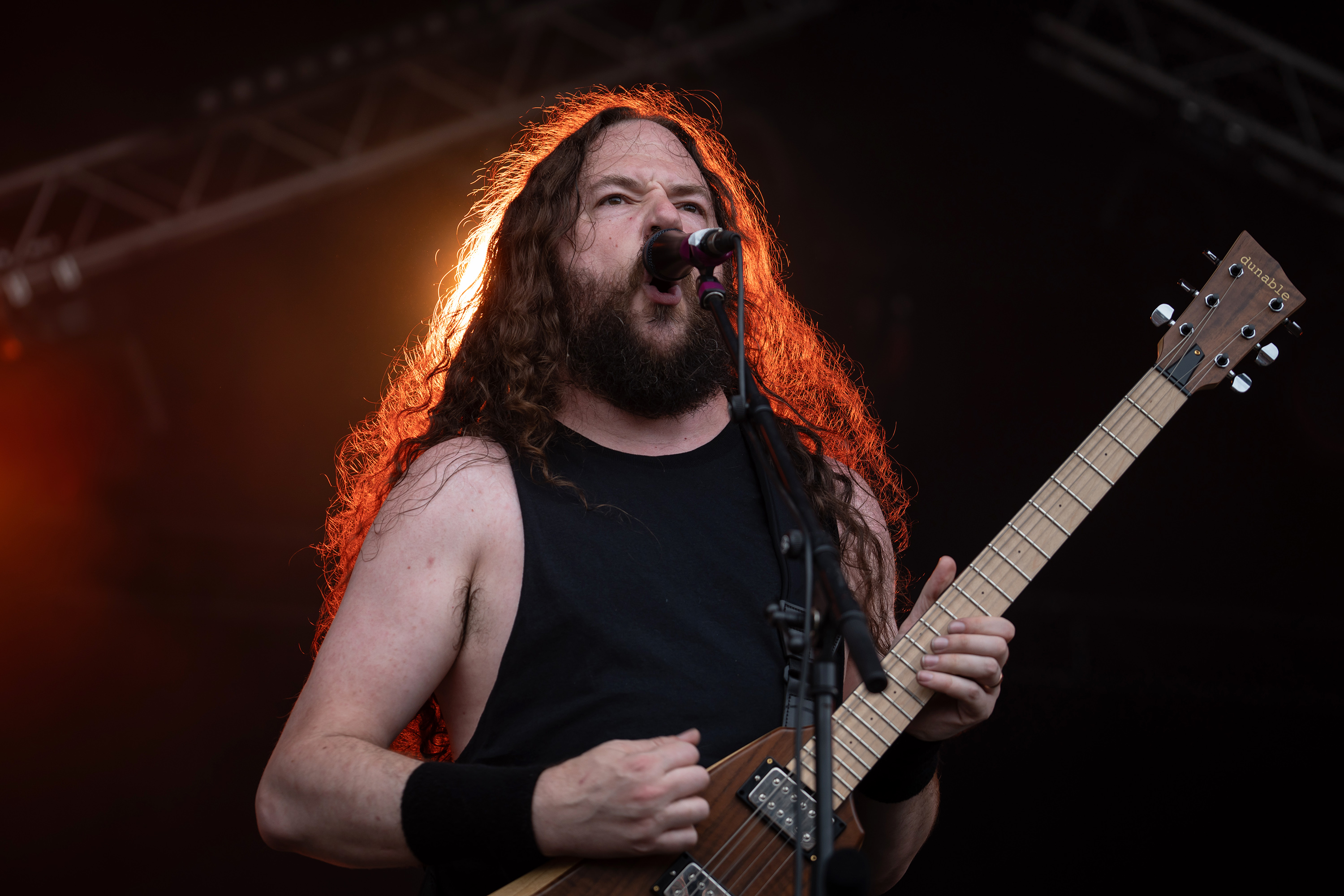
Ben Hutcherson

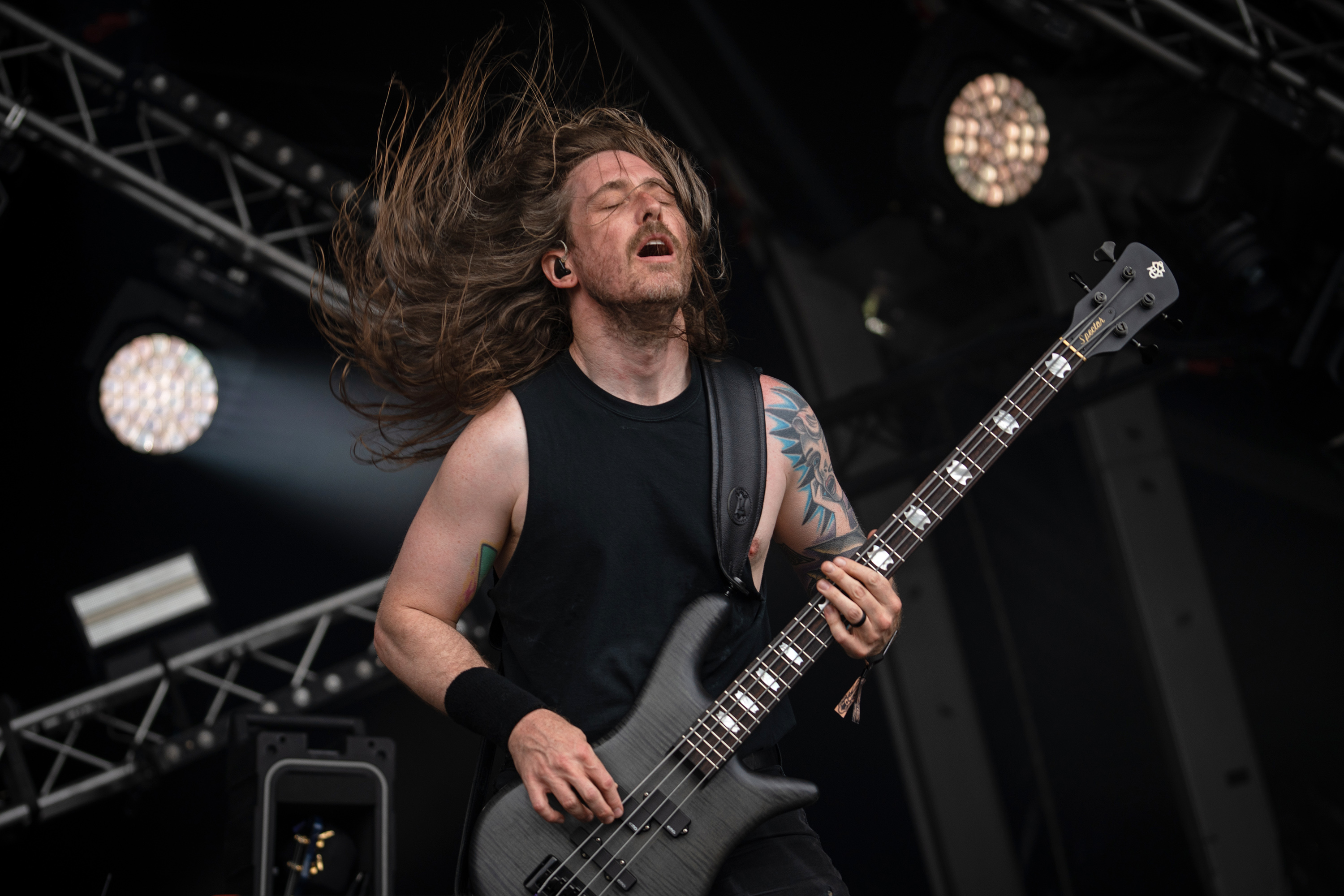
David Small

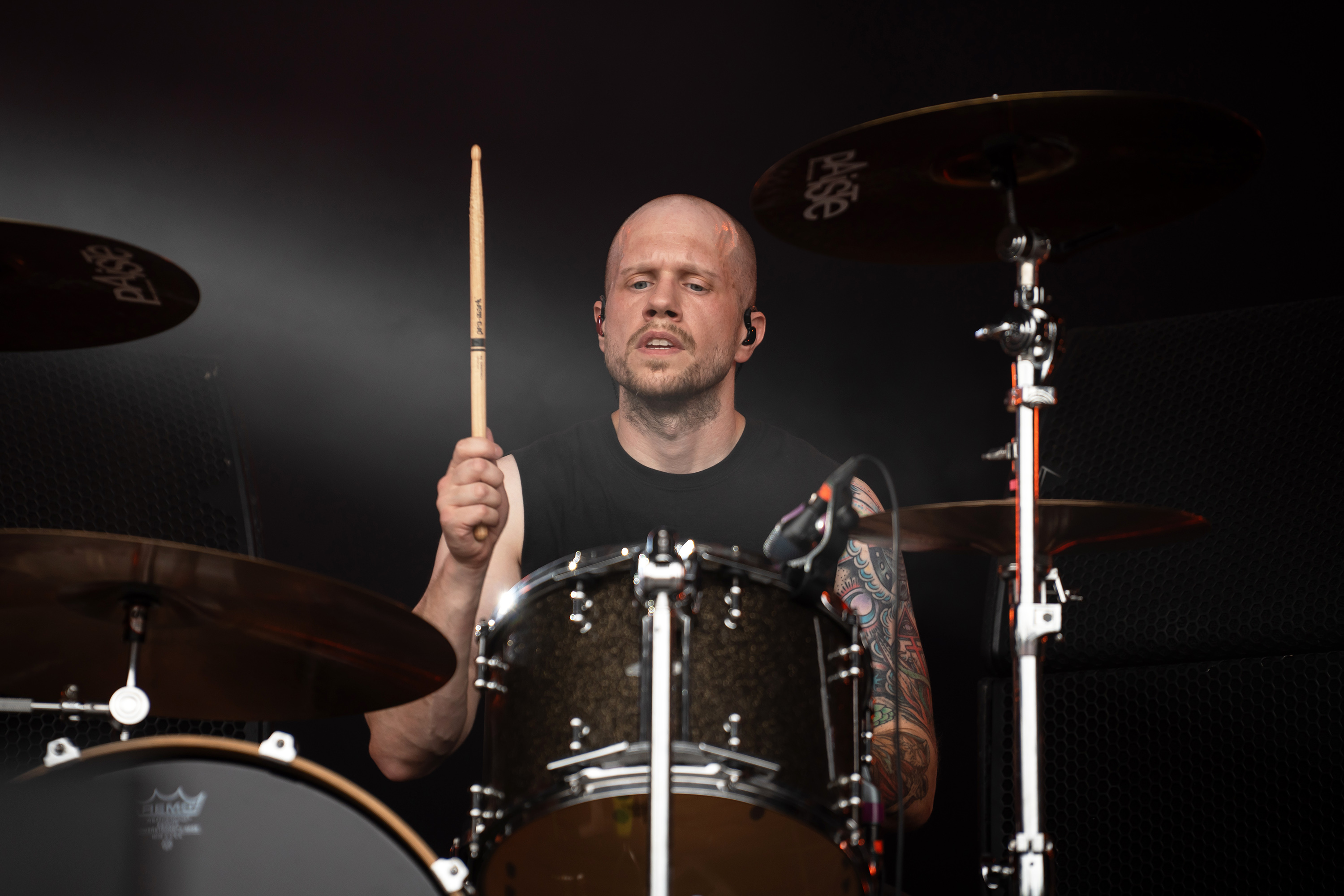
Zach Coleman

=== Former ===
- Daniel Beiers – bass (2012–2020)

== Discography ==
Khemmis discography
- Studio albums: 5
- EPs: 3
- Singles: 2
- Music videos: 4
- Splits: 1
- Mini-LPs: 1

=== Studio albums ===
| Year | Album details |
|---|---|
| 2015 | Absolution: Released: July 7, 2015; Label: 20 Buck Spin; Formats: vinyl, CD, digital download |
| 2016 | Hunted: Released: October 21, 2016; Label: 20 Buck Spin, Graven Earth Records; Formats: vinyl, CD, cassette, digital download |
| 2018 | Desolation: Released: June 22, 2018; Label: 20 Buck Spin, Nuclear Blast; Formats: vinyl, CD, cassette, digital download |
| 2021 | Deceiver: Released: November 19, 2021; Label: Nuclear Blast; Formats: vinyl, CD, cassette, digital download |
| 2026 | Khemmis: Released: June 12, 2026; Label: Nuclear Blast; Formats: vinyl, CD, cassette, digital download |

=== EPs ===
| Year | EP details |
|---|---|
| 2013 | Khemmis: Released: November 14, 2013; Label: independent; Formats: digital download |
| 2020 | More Songs About Death Vol 1: Released: July 3, 2020; Label: independent; Formats: digital download |
| 2023 | Where the Cold Wind Blows: Released: April 28, 2023; Label: Nuclear Blast; Formats: digital download |

=== Mini-LPs ===
| Year | Mini-LP details |
| 2020 | Doomed Heavy Metal: Released: April 17, 2020; Label: Nuclear Blast; Formats: vinyl, CD, digital download |

=== Singles ===
| Year | Single details |
| 2017 | "Empty Throne": Released: May 17, 2017; Label: Decibel Magazine; Formats: flexi disc |
| 2021 | "Sigil": Released: September 7, 2021; Label: Decibel Magazine; Formats: flexi disc |

=== Splits ===
| Year | Details | Track listing |
| 2017 | Fraught with Peril: Released: June 16, 2017; Label: War Crimes Recordings; Formats: vinyl, digital download | Side A: Khemmis – "A Conversation with Death" Side B: Spirit Adrift – "Man of Constant Sorrow" |
