= Grief & Distance =

EP by Clint Lowery
- Released: June 12, 2020
- Recorded: March 2020
- Studio: Sawhorse Studios in St. Louis
- Genre: Acoustic rock
- Length: 21:58
- Label: Rise
- Producer: Clint Lowery

Clint Lowery chronology
God Bless the Renegades (2020)	Grief & Distance (2020)

Professional ratings
Review scores
Source	Rating
Sonic Perspectives	8.6/10
Dead Press	7/10
Square One Magazine	3/5 stars

Grief & Distance is an EP by Sevendust's guitarist Clint Lowery, which was released on June 12, 2020, through Rise Records.

== Writing and production ==
Clint Lowery began working on the EP after a tour with Alter Bridge, in early 2020. He recorded five songs at Sawhorse Studios in St. Louis, Missouri. The EP features three new songs, plus acoustic versions of "What's The Matter" and "Kings", which were previously released on God Bless the Renegades.

He dedicated this album to his mother who died in March 2020. Lowery says, "This EP was my way to process the loss of my mother, and the hard hit and the uncertainty of my livelihood from the pandemic." He continues, "I escaped into my basement and into the songwriting process…it never fails me."

== Track listing ==
All tracks are written by Clint Lowery, except where noted

No.	Title	Writer(s)	Length
1.	"Distance"		4:17
2.	"Haunted"		3:34
3.	"I'm Wrong"		4:11
4.	"What's the Matter" (Acoustic Version)	Lowery; Michael "Elvis" Baskette	4:33
5.	"Kings" (Acoustic Version)	Lowery; Baskette; Drew Fulk	4:23
Total length:			21:58

== Personnel ==
- Clint Lowery – vocals, guitar, bass, drums, producer
- Brian Vodinh – programming
- Jason McEntire – engineering
- Mike Ferretti – mixing
- Brad Blackwood – mastering
