= Spirit Adrift =

American heavy metal band

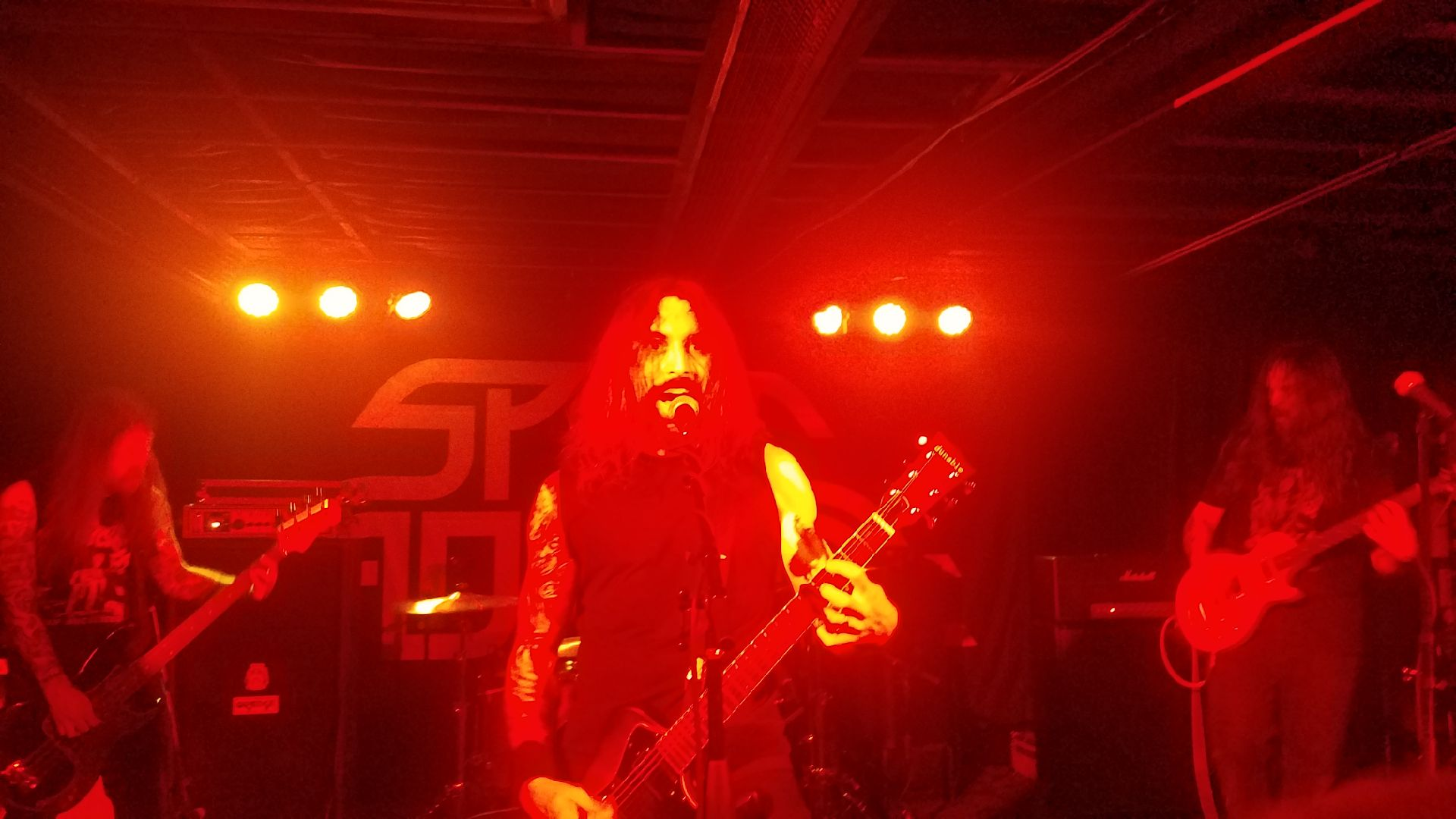
- Spirit Adrift performing live in 2019

Background information
- Genres: Heavy metal, doom metal
- Years active: 2015–2026
- Labels: 20 Buck Spin, Century Media
- Members: Nate Garrett
- Website: spiritadrift.com

Spirit Adrift was an American heavy metal band formed in Mesa, Arizona. The project began in 2015 as the solo endeavor of Nate Garrett, and eventually grew into a full touring band. The band is now based in Austin, Texas. Kerrang! ranks Spirit Adrift among the top ten American bands of the 2010s.

== History ==
Spirit Adrift started in 2015, in the immediate wake of multi-instrumentalist and songwriter Nate Garrett's newfound sobriety. The debut EP Behind - Beyond and first full-length album Chained to Oblivion were recorded in 2015 and released in February and October 2016, respectively. Because of demand for live performances, a full band was formed consisting of Marcus Bryant, Jeff Owens, and Chase Mason. The first Spirit Adrift show took place on May 15, 2017 at The Rebel Lounge in Phoenix, Arizona with Gatecreeper and Pallbearer. Shortly after, a split with Khemmis was released on War Crime Recordings. The split, entitled Fraught with Peril, features updated heavy metal versions of traditional Appalachian songs. Spirit Adrift reinterpret Man of Constant Sorrow on this release.

On October 6, 2017, Spirit Adrift released their second full-length, Curse of Conception on 20 Buck [Spin. The band embarked on North American tours in support of its release, including dates at Decibel Metal & Beer Fest, Migration Fest and Psycho Las Vegas. Curse of Conception received widespread critical acclaim, including landing the number two spot on Decibel's Best of 2017 list.

On October 23, 2018, "Eyes Were Not Alive" was released as a single via the Decibel Flexi Series.

On May 10, 2019, the band released their third full-length, Divided by Darkness, again on 20 Buck Spin. Leading up to the album's release, Revolver debuted the official music video for the song "Angel and Abyss". The North American tour in support of Divided by Darkness included dates at Northwest Terror Fest and Modified Ghost Fest. In late 2019, Eric Wagner replaced Jeff Owens on guitar. The band then embarked on a co-headlining tour of Europe with Sanhedrin, and appeared at Aftershock Festival in Sacramento.

In early 2020, Garrett announced that Eric Wagner and Chase Mason would no longer be part of Spirit Adrift. In June 2020, the band surprise-released the Angel & Abyss Redux EP to raise money for the NAACP Legal Defense Fund. Then in August, they announced their new album Enlightened in Eternity, which was released on October 16 on 20 Buck Spin in North America, and Century Media in the rest of the world.

On March 24, 2023, the band announced their upcoming fifth album, Ghost at the Gallows. In anticipation for the new album, the song "Death Won't Stop Me" was released as a single.

On April 10, 2026, Spirit Adrift released their sixth and final album, Infinite Illumination, the swan song of Spirit Adrift. Their final live show took place on May 28, 2026 (opening for Necrot and Cryptopsy).

== Members ==
- Nate Garrett – vocals, guitar, bass, drums, piano, synthesizer (2015–present)

=== Live ===
- Tom Draper - guitar
- Sonny DeCarlo - bass
- Michael Arellano - drums

== Discography ==
=== Studio albums ===
- Chained to Oblivion (2016)
- Curse of Conception (2017)
- Divided by Darkness (2019)
- Enlightened in Eternity (2020)
- Ghost at the Gallows (2023)
- Infinite Illumination (2026)

=== EPs ===
- Behind - Beyond (2016)
- Angel & Abyss Redux (2020)
- Forge Your Future (2021)

=== Live ===
- Hot & Heavy: Live In Tejas (2024)

=== Compilations ===
- Volume 4 (Redux) (2020)
- 20 Centuries Gone (2022)

=== Singles ===
- "Eyes Were Not Alive" (2018)

=== Splits ===
- Fraught with Peril (2017)
