= Killitorous =

Canadian metal band

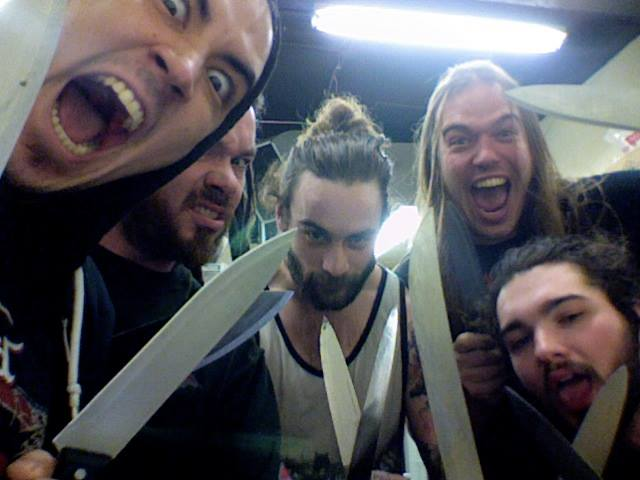

Background information
- Origin: Ottawa, Ontario, Canada
- Genres: Technical Death Metal, Grindcore, Death Metal
- Years active: 2006–present
- Label: Tentacles Industries
- Members: Aaron Homma; Eric Morotti; Nick Miller; Mathieu Dhani; Marc Roy; Xavier Sperdouklis

Killitorous is a Canadian technical death metal band based in Ottawa, Ontario. The band is known for its unorthodox blend of technical death metal, grindcore and hardcore as well as using comedy and pop culture references rather than stereotypical death metal themes.

Formed in 2006 the band has seen multiple line up changes leaving founding guitarist Aaron Homma as the only original member, although Eric Morotti and Nick Miller from the debut 2014 full length Party, Grind still remain in the band.

== History ==
=== Demo (2006–2008) ===
The band was formed in 2006 by guitarists: Aaron Homma, Andrew Allston, Alan Steinke, Bryan Lomas and Matt Milford in Ottawa, Ontario, Canada. Killitorous immediately recorded a demo which featured the songs: "Fecal Fellatio" and "Carving A Totem Pole A Top Blood Mountain Whilst Enslaving The Local Mountain Folk Population As Cattle". Following the release of the demo the band started working with Canadian guitar company Indie Guitars exclusively.

=== Pretend To Make Babies EP (2009–2010) ===
The band solidified its line-up by adding drummer Eric Morotti and guitarist Derek St-Amour for the release of the Pretend To Make Babies EP.

The EP was recorded in Ottawa, Ontario, Canada, at Addictive Sound Studios with Dean Hadji.

=== Hiatus (2011–2013) ===
Following multiple shows to promote the EP the band decided they would be going on hiatus. Aaron and Matt were busy toured with Immersed (Unique Leader Records) and Eric with Blind Witness (Mediaskare Records).

In mid-2011 Nick Miller joined the band plans to reunite for a mini-tour in 2012 began. Following the success of the reunion the band announced plans for their new album.

=== Party, Grind (2014–2015) ===
The band recruited Immersed vocalist Mark Phillips and started working on the first full-length album Party, Grind. Tracking of the album started in 2012 at Garage Studios/The Grid Studios in Montreal, Quebec, with producer Chris Donaldson from Cryptopsy.

Party, Grind was premiered in 2014 online via MetalSucks and was independently released in physical format. The band also released two music videos for the songs: "It's not Stanley, It's Stan Lee" and "Fecal Fellatio". The music video for "It's not Stanley, It's Stan Lee" helped boost the bands following greatly, making the Kerrang Magazine list of "Best superhero songs of all time".

Following the album release tour in 2014, Mark Phillips and Matt Milford parted ways with the band. In 2014, Youri Raymond from the bands Cryptopsy and Unhuman joined on vocals. In 2015, Szymon Szańczuk joined on bass.

=== The Afterparty (2020) ===
Returning with The Afterparty being released on Tentacles Industries May 22, 2020. The album features 3 harmonious guitars on the entire album, Marc Roy who played bass previously switched over to guitar and Xavier Sperdouklis joined as a full time bassist in 2019. The album features tons of notable guests musicians, and is much more progressive than the previous album.

== Band members ==
=== Current ===
- Mathieu Dhani - vocals (2015–present) (ex-Epiphany from the Abyss)
- Aaron Homma - guitar (2006–present) (Annihilator, Erimha (live), ex-Immersed, ex-Vital Remains, ex-Today I Caught the Plague)
- Nick Miller - guitar (2011–present) (First Fragment, Erimha (live), Unleash the Archers (live), Obduracy, ex-Drillpoint, ex-Sonburst, ex-Crimson Shadows (live))
- Marc Roy - guitar (2015–present) (ex-Divine Realm)
- Xavier Sperdouklis - bass (2018–present)
- Eric Morotti - drums (2009–present) (Suffocation, ex-Epocholypse, Blind Witness)

=== Live ===
- Youri Raymond - vocals (2014–2017)
- Szymon Szanczuk - bass (2015–2017)
- Eric Castilla - bass (2014–2015)
- Nick "Le Fou" Wells - drums (2018–2020)

=== Former ===
- Lanie Klipp - vocals (2014) (Murder Dove, ex-Among Ashes, ex-Seconds Flat, ex-Still Breathing, ex-Wydasleep)
- Mark Phillips - vocals (2012–2014)
- Luke McIsaac - vocals (2011–2012)
- Franky Falsetto - vocals (2010–2011)
- Bryan Lomas - vocals (2006–2010) (ex-Conquering Valhalla, ex-Kenoma)
- Alan Steinke - guitar (2006–2008)
- Andrew Allston - guitar (2006–2009) (ex-Kenoma, ex-Argus Panoptes, ex-Insurrection)
- Derek St-Amour - guitar (2009–2010)
- Matt Milford - bass (2006–2014)
- Adrian Taylor Chasse - drums (2008) (Mehkaya)
- Adrian Blackburn - drums (2008)
- Dave Maclean - drums (2008)
- Tyler Black - drums (2009)
