= Mantiis =

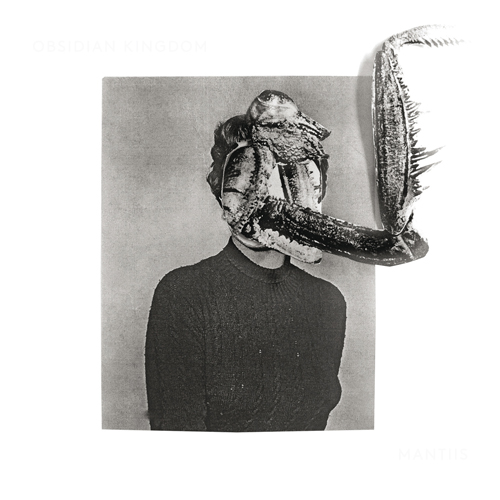

Studio album by Obsidian Kingdom
- Released: November 16, 2012
- Recorded: August 2012 at Ax Studios, Barcelona
- Genre: post-metal progressive death metal experimental rock avant-garde metal post-rock blackened death metal
- Length: 47:03
- Producer: Jorge Mur and Obsidian Kingdom

Obsidian Kingdom chronology
Mantiis	A Year With No Summer

Professional ratings
Review scores
Source	Rating
Terrorizer	4/5 stars
Legacy	14/15 stars

Mantiis – An Agony in Fourteen Bites (2012) is the first studio album by Barcelona-based band Obsidian Kingdom. It is a concept album featuring a single song divided into fourteen tracks, noted for reflecting a broad range of emotions through a great variety of genres. The album was recorded, mixed and produced by Jorge Mur and the band at Ax Studios in Barcelona, and mastered by Jens Bogren at Fascination Street Studios. The artwork of the physical edition was in charge of Elena Gallen, under art direction by Ritxi Ostáriz and the band itself.

== Critical reception ==
Mantiis was well received critically, obtaining positive reviews during 2012 and 2013, which praised the complex fusion of different genres, the originality of the proposal and the quality of its sound production.

== Track listing ==
All tracks are written by Obsidian Kingdom.

No.	Title	Length
1.	"Not Yet Five"	4:18
2.	"Oncoming Dark"	2:51
3.	"Through the Glass"	2:25
4.	"Cinnamon Balls"	3:04
5.	"The Nurse"	1:49
6.	"Answers Revealing"	2:35
7.	"Last of the Light"	5:06
8.	"Genteel to Mention"	2:51
9.	"Awake Until Dawn"	3:45
10.	"Haunts of the Underworld"	3:52
11.	"Endless Wall"	4:45
12.	"Fingers in Anguish"	2:56
13.	"Ball-Room"	2:22
14.	"And Then it Was"	4:26

== Personnel ==
Band members

- Rider G Omega – guitar and vocals
- Prozoid Zeta JSI – guitar
- Zer0 Æmeour Íggdrasil – keyboards and vocals
- Fleast Race O'Uden – bass
- Ojete Mordaza II – drums

Other personnel

- Nicholas Dominic Talvola – trumpet on "Last of the Light"
- Fiar – vocals on "Awake Until Dawn"
