= God Bless the Renegades =

Studio album by Clint Lowery
- Released: January 31, 2020
- Recorded: June 2019
- Studio: Studio Barbarosa in Gotha, Florida
- Length: 40:57
- Label: Rise
- Producer: Michael "Elvis" Baskette

Clint Lowery chronology
God Bless the Renegades (2020)	Grief & Distance (2020)

Singles from God Bless the Renegades
- 1. "Kings" Released: November 1, 2019

Professional ratings
Review scores
Source	Rating
Kerrang!	2/5 stars

God Bless the Renegades is the first full-length solo album by Sevendust's guitarist Clint Lowery. The album was recorded and mixed at Studio Barbarosa in Gotha, Florida, produced by Michael "Elvis" Baskette. It was released under label Rise on January 31, 2020.

== Track listing ==
All tracks are written by Clint Lowery and Michael "Elvis" Baskette except where noted.

No.	Title	Writer(s)	Length
1.	"God Bless the Renegades"		4:16
2.	"Here"		3:47
3.	"Kings"	Lowery; Baskette; Drew Fulk	4:07
4.	"Alive"		3:34
5.	"What's the Matter"		4:09
6.	"You Go First"		4:06
7.	"Allowed to Run"	Lowery; Baskette; Erik Ron	4:50
8.	"Silver Lining"		4:10
9.	"She's Free"		3:38
10.	"Do We Fear God"		4:20
Total length:			40:57

== Personnel ==
- Clint Lowery – vocals, guitars, bass guitar, drums
- Wolfgang Van Halen – drums, bass guitar
- Michael "Elvis" Baskette – production, mixing, programming
- Jef Moll – engineering, digital editing
- Josh Saldate – assistant engineer
- Brad Blackwood – mastering

== See also ==
- List of 2020 albums
