= Obsidian Kingdom =

Spanish rock band

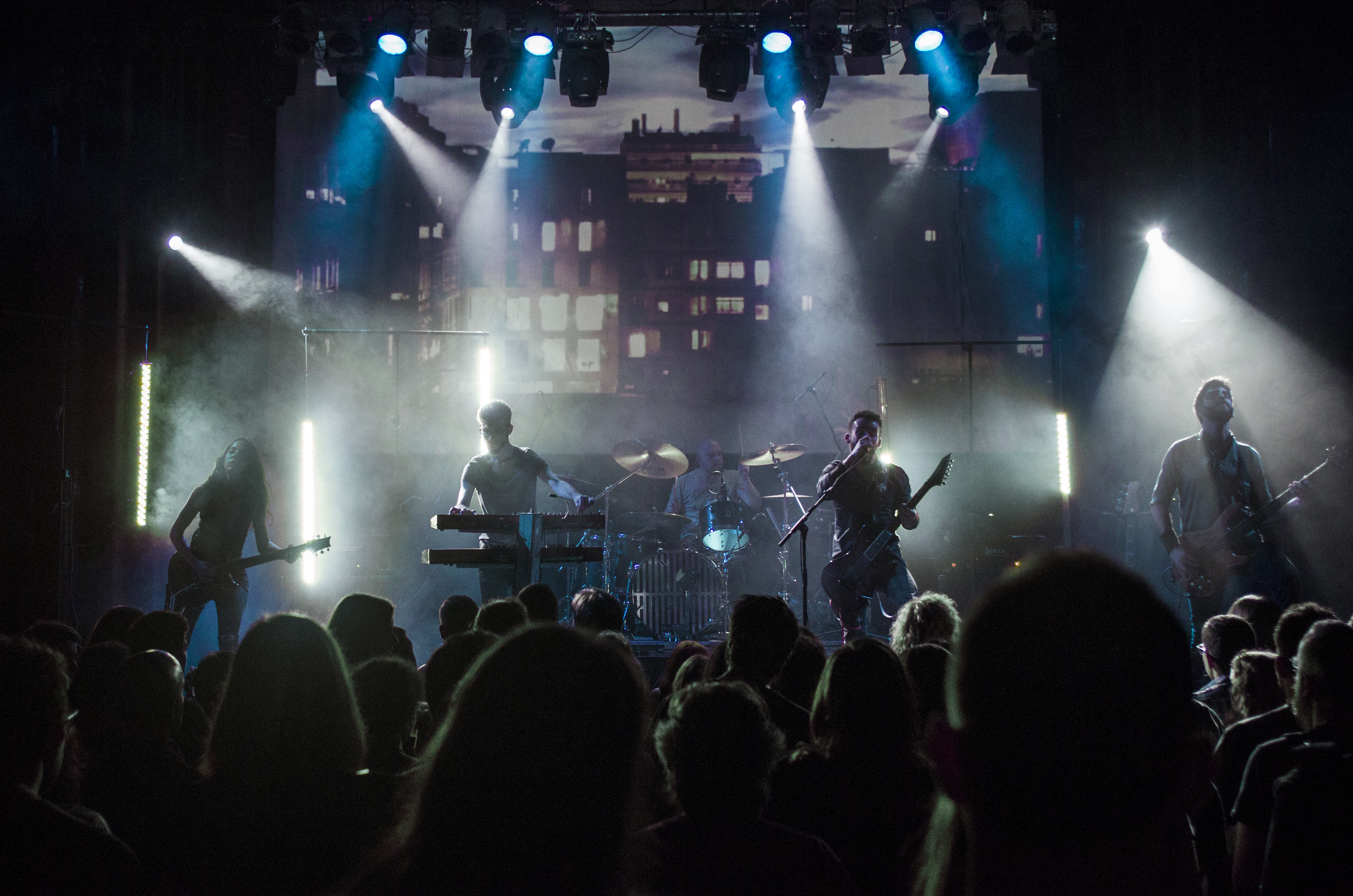
- Obsidian Kingdom performing A Year With No Summer during its presentation concert at Apolo in Barcelona, April the 16th 2016. Caption by Carles Romagosa.

Background information
- Origin: Barcelona, Spain
- Genres: Progressive metal, post-metal, experimental rock, alternative rock
- Years active: 2005–present
- Members: Rider G Omega; Ojete Mordaza II; Om Rex Orale; Jade Riot Cul; Viral Vector Lips
- Past members: Eaten Roll I Seerborn Ape Tot; Zer0 Æmeour Íggdrasil; Fleast Race O'Uden; Prozoid Zeta JSI; Saten Haz Im Nu; Fatal Error Pl(a)n; Croma LAN Ro
- Website: http://obsidiankingdom.com/

Obsidian Kingdom is a music band formed in 2005 in Barcelona, whose music is not easy to label. The band itself defines it as “hard-to-classify heavy sound with plenty of contrasts”. The band's music has been characterized as drawing equally on progressive rock, post-metal, black metal, alternative and electronic music. In 2013, Metal Injection called them "the masters of every genre".

== History ==
=== 2005–2011: Early works ===
The band was originally formed by guitar player Rider G Omega and drummer Croma LAN Ro in Barcelona. Guitar player Prozoid Zeta JSI and bass player Fatal Error Pl\:A\n joined the band later in 2005, and the line-up was completed in 2006 with singer Saten Haz Im Nu. Their first work was the MCD Matter (2007), the reviews of which were overall good while highlighting production as a weak point. During the subsequent year after Matter’s release, Obsidian Kingdom toured Spain and Portugal.

Their following release, the EP 3:11, was recorded during 2009 and out in 2010, serving as a preview to what should have been their first album: Fera. The band entrusted Ritxi Ostáriz (Ulver, Ihsahn) with the artwork design. On this occasion, reviews underlined the band's evolution in sound and composition, as well as the great amount of influences and different styles that could be heard in their music.

Right before the release of 3:11, the band's line-up suffered drastic changes, with the departures of Nu, Ro, and Pl(a)n, but by 2011 the lineup had stabilized with the addition of keyboard player Zer0 Æmeour Íggdrasil, drummer Ojete Mordaza II, and bass player Fleast Race O’Uden. Obsidian Kingdom promoted 3:11 with this new setup during 2011, through a few local shows.

=== 2012: Mantiis ===
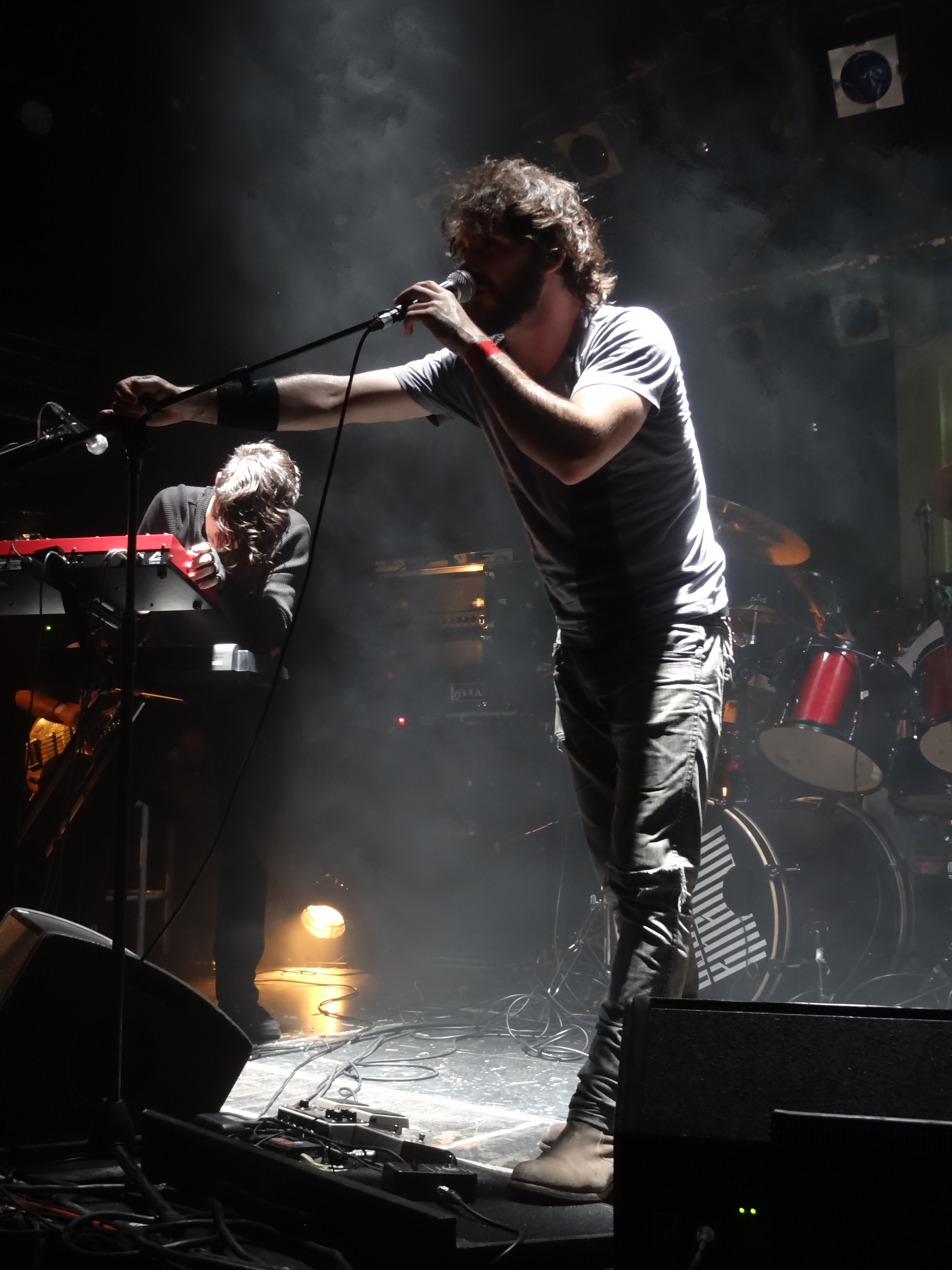
Obsidian Kingdom performing in Barcelona, January 2013.

In November 2012 Obsidian Kingdom released the LP Mantiis, a concept album consisting of a single song divided into 14 tracks, which is defined by reflecting a diverse palette of emotions and the great amount of genres that it contains. The album, that includes guest appearances by Fiar (singer from the Catalan black metal band Foscor) and trumpeter Nicholas Dominic Talvola, obtained very positive reviews from specialized press. Once more, design was in charge of Ritxi Ostáriz, who posed this time as Art Director, while creative responsibilities relied on visual artist Elena Gallen.

Mantiis was officially presented live on December 14, 2012, at Music Hall in Barcelona with Cut the End as supporting band. The album was played in its entirety and the band finished the concert with a cover of the traditional American folk song Wayfaring Stranger. Late live appearances during 2013 include the support of Cult of Luna during their January shows in Madrid and Barcelona, and their performance in April at Headway Festival.

In November 2013, the band released Torn & Burnt, which contains seven remixes from Mantiis signed by electronic producers such as DJ Oktopus from Dälek, Subheim, Poordream, Necro Deathmort, Jr Morgue, Drumcorps, Larvae and Mothboy.

In April 2014 Obsidian Kingdom is signed to the independent music label Season of Mist. Following the re-issue of Mantiis on October 24, the band embarked on a tour across Europe and the UK, headlined by the Icelandic post-rock band Sólstafir. Obsidian Kingdom's performance throughout the tour received praiseworthy reviews from the media, which highlighted the band's presence, energy and intensity onstage.

Mantiis was played live in its entirety for the last time at Ritual Cvlt Fest in October 2014. The band ended their performance with a cover of the Necro Deathmort Remix of their track "Awake Until Dawn".

=== 2016: A Year With No Summer ===
In June 2015, Obsidian Kingdom played a special show with their Drone Set side-project at the Centre de Cultura Contemporània de Barcelona. Shortly thereafter, the band announced a new line-up (with two new members Seerborn Ape Tot on guitars and Om Rex Orale on bass) and the recording of their new album in the Fall of 2015 with the London-based Colombian producer Jaime Gomez Arellano (Ulver, Paradise Lost).

A Year With No Summer was released by Season of Mist on March 11, 2016 with the songs "Away/Absent", "Black Swan" and "Darkness" as singles. A mockumentary was released for "Black Swan", directed by the Catalan documentary filmmaker Silvia Subirós. The album received several favorable ratings from music critics, that underlined the bold change in style from the band's debut (especially in the vocal register), its thematic depth and the decrement of extreme metal resources in favor of a more accessible sound. It features the guest appearances of Kristoffer Rygg in "10th April" and Attila Csihar in "The Kandinsky Group" and the artwork design is once more credited to Ritxi Ostáriz and Elena Gallen.

In May 2016, the band announced a new line-up change with the incorporation of young guitar player Eaten Roll I and former guitar player Seerborn Ape Tot now playing keyboards after the departure of Zer0 Æmeour Íggdrasil. In Spring 2016 a few presentation shows were held in different cities of Spain, along with the band's performance at Be Prog and Resurrection festivals in July 2016. The album was then promoted in a full-blown European and UK tour in September 2016 with Shining and Intronaut.

To commemorate the first anniversary of the record, the band performed electronic covers of its songs at the Error! Design Art Gallery on March 11, 2017, along with some others from Radiohead, Led Zeppelin and Lou Reed.

=== 2020: MEAT MACHINE ===
In June 2018, Obsidian Kingdom received a commission from the Centre de Cultura Contemporània de Barcelona to write an original score for the classic silent film The Phantom Carriage, to be performed as the opening for the Gandules'18 "Illuminated cinema: Magic, altered states and the occult" open air cinema cycle, which was part of an exhibition dedicated to the occult called "La Llum Negra" (The Black Light). The score was written by producer and long-time collaborator Jorge Mur, and was performed on the evening of 7 August 2018 before a full patio.

In December 2019, the band performed two new songs for the first time at the Madrid is the Dark Fest, displaying another line-up change: Jade Riot Cul on the keyboards and Eaten Roll I no longer on guitar.

MEAT MACHINE was released worldwide by Season of Mist on September 25, 2020. Two videos were released as singles: "MEAT STAR" was directed by Spanish filmmakers Ferran Ureña and Eric Morales and received the "Best International Music Video" award at the 2020 edition of the Santiago Horror Film Festival in Santiago de Chile, and "THE PUMP" featured an animated piece produced by Ukrainian artist Jakov Burov. The release was met with critical acclaim and most journalists highlighted the band's ability to remain inclassificable while pushing the limits of the metal genre. The album was noted for its variety, unpredictability and frantic creativity, and was declared the "Best National Metal Record of 2020" by Spanish music magazine Mondo Sonoro.

In September 2020, Obsidian Kingdom was featured on the cover of the Spanish edition of Metal Hammer magazine. In December 2020, MEAT MACHINE was first presented live at the ninth edition of AMFest in Barcelona. The band has announced a European tour in May 2021 in support of Enslaved.

== Discography ==
=== Studio albums ===
- Mantiis (16 November 2012, LP)
- Torn & Burnt (15 November 2013, remix album)
- A Year With No Summer (11 March 2016, LP)
- MEAT MACHINE (25 September 2020, LP)

=== EPs ===
- Matter (2007, MCD)
- 3:11 (2010, EP)

== Members ==
Timeline

Current members

- Rider G Omega - guitars, vocals (2005–present)
- Ojete Mordaza II - drums (2010–present)
- Om Rex Orale - bass guitar (2015–present)
- Jade Riot Cul - keyboard (2016–present)
- Viral Vector Lips - guitars (2019–present)

Former members

- Eaten Roll I - guitars (2016–2019), vocals (2018–2019)
- Seerborn Ape Tot - keyboards (2015–2016), guitars (2015)
- Zer0 Æmeour Íggdrasil - keyboards, vocals (2010–2016)
- Fleast Race O'Uden - bass guitar (2011–2015)
- Prozoid Zeta JSI - guitars (2005–2015)
- Saten Haz Im Nu - vocals (2006–2011)
- Fatal Error Pl/:a/n - bass guitar (2005–2011)
- Croma LAN Ro - drums (2005–2011)
