= Clint Lowery =

American musician

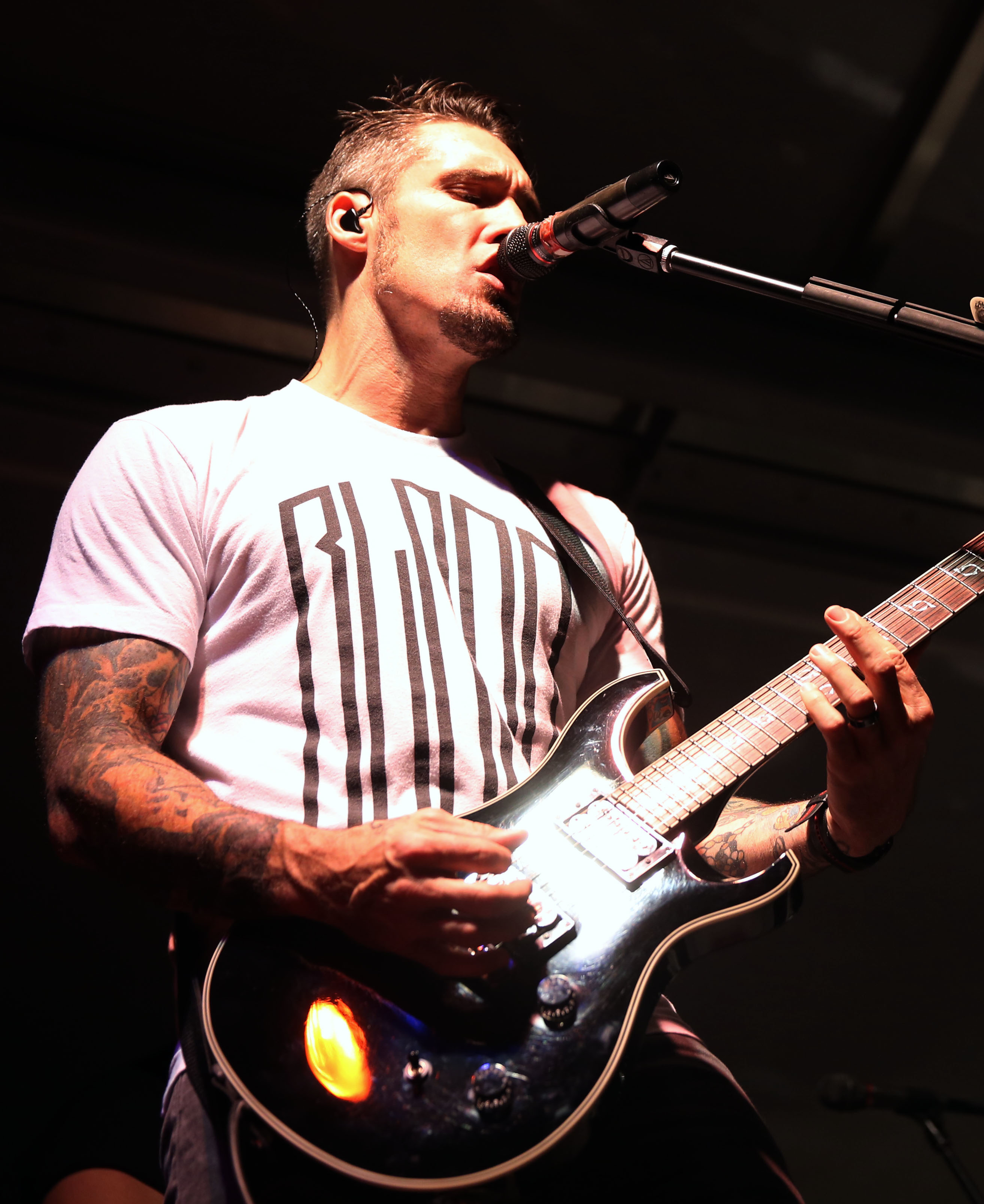
- Lowery performing in 2014

Background information
- Also known as: Cleetus; Johnny Hollywood; Hello Demons Meet Skeletons
- Born: Clint Edward Lowery; December 15, 1971 (age 54); Jacksonville, Florida, U.S.
- Origin: Fayetteville, North Carolina, U.S.
- Genres: Heavy metal; hard rock; alternative metal; nu metal; acoustic
- Occupations: Musician; songwriter; producer
- Instruments: Guitar; vocals
- Years active: 1988–present
- Labels: Warner Bros.; Rise; 7 Bros.; Dark Blanket
- Member of: Sevendust
- Formerly of: Still Rain; Dark New Day; Call Me No One; Seether; Korn
- Website: clintlowery.net

Clint Edward Lowery (born December 15, 1971) is an American musician, songwriter and producer, best known as a guitarist and backing vocalist in the rock band Sevendust. He has also played in Dark New Day and Still Rain, and served as the touring guitarist for Korn and Seether through most of 2007 and 2017, respectively. In 2008, he decided to work on new music as a solo artist, and the name of the project was titled Hello Demons Meet Skeletons. Lowery wrote and recorded a six-song EP while off the road with Sevendust, just for a week. He played every instrument on the CD, which was produced by his brother Corey Lowery. The EP, Chills, was released in October, followed by a tour at the same month. He would also later release two more EPs with HDMS. Also his fourth and last EP, Choices, was released in 2013.

In summer of 2012, Lowery went on to form a band, Call Me No One, as lead vocalist and guitarist alongside Sevendust bandmate Morgan Rose. Their first album was released in June 2012, titled Last Parade.

He unveiled a signature guitar for Paul Reed Smith, the PRS SE Clint Lowery in June 2013.

== Career ==
=== Still Rain ===
In 1989, Lowery alongside vocalist Donnie Hamby, guitarist Troy McLawhorn, bassist Corey Lowery and drummer Bevan Davies started a new band called Still Rain. Lowery with the band played everywhere from Daytona to Atlanta to Louisville, Kentucky. Even as far north as Grand Rapids, Michigan, at Club Eastbrook. The band averaged 300 shows per year. Mixing multiple sets of covers with their own original music. Doing this, they built up quite a big following. After doing this for a few years, they decided to go all original, producing their first album (they had done tapes before, which sold out quickly) called Still Rain. A second album, Bitter Black Water, soon followed.

=== Sevendust ===
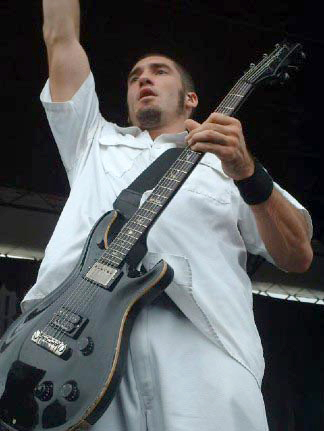
Lowery with Sevendust in 1998

After Still Rain, Lowery joined American heavy metal band Sevendust as a guitarist, quite different from previous band's style and sound. They released their first studio album titled Sevendust, On April 15, 1997. In 1998, they released a compilation called Live and Loud, which featured live footage of the band's September 16, 1998 performance at Chicago's Metro. In 1999, they released their second studio album Home, which had four singles and had good chart performance in mainstream and modern rock charts which were better than first album's singles chart. He performed with the band at Woodstock '99, and also they gained European exposure by opening for Skunk Anansie at various shows in Germany. They opened with Kid Rock and Ted Nugent for Metallica on New Year's Eve in 1999 at the Pontiac Silverdome near Detroit, Michigan. They also joined Slipknot, Coal Chamber and other bands on the Tattoo the Earth Tour in June 2000. In 2001, Sevendust released new album Animosity. In 2003, Sevendust returned with their fourth album, Seasons. This was one of the band's best received albums and to-date features their highest-charting single (tied with "Driven"), "Enemy", which peaked at #10 on the Mainstream Rock Chart. "Enemy", was also used as the official theme song for "Unforgiven (2003)". In 2004, for the first time in the band's career, they released a live album on a CD–DVD double-disk package titled Southside Double-Wide: Acoustic Live, includes a tribute cover of "Hurt" by Nine Inch Nails. In 2004, Lowery left Sevendust to join the post-grunge band Dark New Day. However, Lowery returned to Sevendust in the spring of 2008 and recorded their eighth album Cold Day Memory, released in 2010. "I didn't want to come back and have people say, 'Oh, it's not as good as it was,' " Lowery said. "There was definitely a need to go up another notch, and I hope we did." In September 2012, it was announced that Sevendust would go to studio to record its ninth album for an early 2013 release. The released another studio album: Truth Killer, in 2023. Their most recent album: One, was released in 2026

=== Dark New Day ===
On December 11, 2004, after playing a Sevendust show in Columbus, Ohio, it was announced that Lowery had left the band mid-tour, because he wanted to play with his brother Corey Lowery in his new band Dark New Day, who had reportedly just signed with Warner Bros. records. Guitarist J3, formerly of Tommy Lee, was hired temporarily to fill in for the rest of the dates, and was eventually replaced by Sonny Mayo (from Snot and Amen). On June 14, 2005, the band released their first album, Twelve Year Silence through Warner Bros. Records. The first single from the effort, "Brother", was a surprise hit on active and alternative stations, although the follow-up, "Pieces", did not fare nearly as well. On September 5, 2006, Dark New Day released an EP through iTunes called Black Porch (Acoustic Sessions), which features new tracks "Breakdown" and "Storm" as well as acoustic versions of some of the songs from Twelve Year Silence. The only single that was released, was the acoustic version of "Follow The Sun Down". In September 2007, Lowery posted on Dark New Day's MySpace page saying that the band returned to the studio to record their next album with producer Dave Bendeth. On February 7, 2009, after months of no word on the album, he posted a blog entry stating the likely possibility that the second album will never be released. He did say that there was a chance of it getting released on iTunes but no word of when. However, on September 1, via Twitter he posted, "Cool, 2 new complete dnd records will be available on iTunes and other digital stores soon. Some real cool unreleased material. Stay tuned!." This was followed by another message by Lowery a day later stating "FYI- Dark new day "hail Mary" and "B-sides" albums should be available next week on iTunes etc. if all goes well. Was a long time coming." Dark New Day albums 'Hail Mary' and 'B-Sides' are now available on iTunes. Also, the band rerecorded some of the material and released "New Tradition" in 2012. Regarding the future of the band, Lowery stated that he didn't know what shape the band was in but that it was most likely on permanent hiatus.

=== Korn ===
In 2007, Lowery toured with Korn as their live guitarist for 8 months until he left in October 2007. Lowery made his debut with the band on March 1, 2007, when the band made its first appearance ever on NBC's "The Tonight Show with Jay Leno". Following his arrest due to damaging his hotel room, Lowery was forced to leave Korn one month earlier than anticipated. He was replaced by Shane Gibson. On March 26, 2008, he announced that he had rejoined Sevendust. In a blog stated on the band's MySpace, Will Hunt announced that he would be happy to have Lowery join Dark New Day for any shows in the near future during time off.

=== Solo work ===
Lowery performing as a solo artist in 2008

In September 2008, Lowery wrote and recorded a six-song EP while off the road with Sevendust for a week. He played every instrument on the CD, which was produced by Corey Lowery, at Exocet Studios, under name of "Hello Demons Meet Skeletons".

According to Lowery's personal website, Hello Demons Meet Skeletons was a phrase used to described what happened to a life when all the demons in someone's life came head to head with the skeletons one can accumulate in life. This project was created to unload the demons and skeletons in Lowery's life. A way to lyrically touch on subjects that needed to be touched on in order to move forward with his life and leave the past behind without completely forgetting it. He wanted to play everything himself and sing everything himself because it's a very personal project. He had time off between tours with Sevendust and thought he would take that time to get this out of his system. The EP Chills has 6 songs. His brother Corey Lowery produced, engineered and mixed it for him. It was released over iTunes on October 12, 2008. As of 2009, Lowrey's side project remained on hiatus.

However, in May 2010, he released a solo track titled "The Drive" to iTunes. Lowery also released another new solo song titled "Kicking Tree" to iTunes. On May 23, 2010, he released an old song titled "Bitter" to iTunes.

Lowery's new EP titled "Words That Sing Well", which was mixed at Architekt Music in Butler, NJ, was released on April 19, 2011, to iTunes and other digital outlets. In June 2011, he tweeted about working on a new EP which subsequently would be released as "Uncomfortable Silence", on August 22, 2011. He said this will be the last HDMS for a while.

On June 30, 2013, Lowery wrote on his website about entering studio to record 6 acoustic songs. On June 6, he said that this will be the last record under name of Hello Demons Meet Skeletons and he wants to end this musical project. The EP is recorded at Architekt Music studios in Butler, New Jersey. and ended up as the EP "Choices" released on October 22, 2013. Recently, he decided to bring back the project and announced it in an interview that he is currently working on new EP.

Lowery released debut single "Kings" off of his first full-length studio album God Bless the Renegades, on November 1, 2019. Back in June, he was in the studio working on his official first solo album under his name with producer Michael "Elvis" Baskette, which was released on January 31, 2020, under label Rise.

An EP titled Grief & Distance was released on Rise Records on June 12, 2020.

Ghostwriter EP was released on February 1, 2023, via Dark Blanket Records.

=== Call Me No One ===
In 2012, Lowery and Morgan Rose launched a new project called Call Me No One. They started recording their debut album in the middle of January for a late spring release. The single "Biggest Fan" came out in April and later in June their debut album Last Parade was released. Last Parade was recorded and mixed at Architekt Music in Butler, NJ. The band announced a tour for the summer. and released Thunderbird as second single of Last Parade. Lowery was asked about future of the band, he stated "it's time to put CMNO on a small hold to do the new Sevendust record after a much needed break of course." However he later mentioned on his Instagram page that there will be no more Call Me No One and added that it was a one time deal.

=== Seether ===
In February 2017, it was announced that Lowery would be augmenting the band Seether as a touring guitarist during 2017, then helped out making the album Poison the Parish. Upon completing the tour in 2017, Lowery returned to Sevendust. His brother, Corey, has since taken over duties as Seether's lead guitarist.

== Other works ==
=== Angel's Son ===
"Angel's Son" is a song written by Lajon Witherspoon and Lowery, and performed by Witherspoon, Lowery, Sevendust drummer Morgan Rose and ex-Snot band member (now ex-Sevendust guitarist) Sonny Mayo, for the post-mortem compilation CD, in honor of James Lynn Strait, known as Strait Up. This was the only single track from the tribute album. Subsequently, a studio version of the song was produced by Sevendust for the closing track to their 2001 album, Animosity.

Strait Up
The Strait Up version features the band with ex-Snot bandmates playing on a beach around a camp fire. Footage of James Lynn Strait from the band Snot, who died with his dog Dobbs in a car accident, is superimposed during a vigil around the campfire, growing in attendance with appearances of fellow musicians, including System of a Down, Coal Chamber, Sugar Ray, Kittie, Incubus, Korn and others to say goodbye to their friend as a memorium title is revealed at the last few moments of the song.

=== A Song for Chi ===
An all-star lineup included Lowery, as well as Korn bassist Reginald "Fieldy" Arvizu, drummer Ray Luzier, former guitarist Brian "Head" Welch, Slipknot guitarist Jim Root, have banded together and recorded an instrumental song to benefit Deftones bassist, Chi Cheng, who was left in a coma due too a car accident in November 2008, and died on April 13, 2013, when his heart stopped.

=== Yahweh ===
In 2014, Stryper vocalist/guitarist Michael Sweet met Lowery on a plane. According to Stryper's Facebook page, Sweet said, "I reached out to Clint and asked him if he would like to co-write a track or two for the new Stryper album. Clint agreed and sent me a few riff ideas. I was instantly drawn to the riff that he sent which eventually became 'Yahweh'. I took his original idea and somehow created this 6:30 minute song, which is quite epic and honestly may be one of the most powerful songs we've done in a long time." Lowery responded, "The tune is amazing man. It's got that old school spirit with this modern take. That choir vibe on chorus is beautiful. Vibe change for the solo. Epic my man. Solos are stellar. I don't remember sending anything near this cool". According to the page, Lowery mentioned how Stryper was "an influence on [him] we he was younger."

=== Guitar lessons ===
Lowery planned to offer online guitar lessons via Skype. The lessons go over scales, improvisation, songwriting, and soloing. In January 2015, he released an instructional DVD as part of Fret12's "The Sound And The Story" series.

=== Producing ===
In 2012 and 2013, Lowery produced releases for the bands Dead Fish Handshake, Novus Dae, Statik Silence, Annandale, The Farthest Edge, and Digital Collapse, all at Architekt Music in Butler, New Jersey. Lowery featured co-songwriter on four songs on sophomore album from the Massachusetts-based band Half Past My Sin. Lowery was also recruited for recording the new 3 Years Hollow album.

== Personal life ==
Lowery has two brothers, Corey Lowery and Dustin Lowery, who have played in different bands over the years. All went to Douglas Byrd High School in Fayetteville, North Carolina.

Lowery married Tara Jenkins in St. Louis, Missouri in September 2010. They have a son, Harper, in December 2010 and a daughter, Evie, in March 2013.

Lowery's father Willie Lowery was a musician and an advocate for the Lumbee tribe. He died in 2012.

In an interview with MusicRadar, Lowery mentioned that his first guitar was an Aria Pro II and he was twelve years old when he bought it. Lowery then added that he was a drummer first, and then he started playing acoustic guitar.

=== Legal issues ===
Lowery was arrested on July 5, 2007, at the Hodokvas Festival in Piestany, Slovakia during a Korn tour after a "wild, drunken night" at the event, after which he trashed his room. Lowery was released the following afternoon from police custody after apologizing and paying for the damages.

== Equipment ==
Lowery has used:

- PRS SE Clint Lowery
- PRS Custom 22 guitars (has a black PRS nicknamed "Bruce Lee")
- PRS Singlecuts (Has a custom seven string Singlecut made for him while performing with Korn)
- PRS S2 Starla (Used with Seether)
- Yamaha LJX6C acoustic
- L Series Handcrafted Guitar
- Kemper Profiler
- 2x EVH 5150III Heads (white)
- 2x EVH 5150III Cabs (white)
- Diamond Phantom 100watt amplifier heads (x2) (No longer used live)
- Diamond 4x12 cabinets (No longer used live)
- Mesa/Boogie Mark IV
- Hughes & Kettner (during Dark New Day)
- GCX Ground Control and Audio Switcher
- MXR Phase 90
- TC Electronic ND-1 Nova Delay pedal
- Dunlop Wah pedal
- Electro Harmonix Effects
- TC Electronic G-Force
- Furman AC Line Regulator
- DigiTech Whammy
- DiMarzio Clip Lock Strap (black)

=== PRS SE Clint Lowery ===
In September 2012, PRS said that the new SE Clint Lowery guitar is designed for heavy metal and hard rock players with attitude. It features a beveled mahogany body with white binding on the body, neck, and headstock, a 24-fret, 25½" scale length mahogany neck with rosewood fretboard, Lowery-designed inlays, PRS-designed SE adjustable stoptail bridge and tuners, black nickel hardware, and string gauges 11, 18, 22p, 32, 44, 56 tuned to C♯/drop "B" (C♯-G♯-E-B-F♯-B). The guitar has a wide fat neck profile and comes equipped with SE HFS treble and Vintage bass pickups with one volume and push/pull tone control with 3-way toggle switch.

== Discography ==
=== Solo ===
==== As Hello Demons...Meet Skeletons ====
- Chills EP (October 12, 2008)
- Words That Sing Well EP (April 19, 2011)
- Uncomfortable Silence EP (August 22, 2011)
- Choices EP (October 22, 2013)

==== As Clint Lowery ====
- God Bless the Renegades (January 31, 2020)
- Grief & Distance (EP) (June 12, 2020)
- Ghostwriter (EP) (February 17, 2023)

=== Sevendust ===
- Sevendust (April 15, 1997)
- Home (August 24, 1999)
- Animosity (November 13, 2001)
- Seasons (October 7, 2003)
- Cold Day Memory (April 20, 2010)
- Black Out the Sun (March 26, 2013)
- Time Travelers & Bonfires (April 15, 2014)
- Kill the Flaw (October 2, 2015)
- All I See Is War (May 11, 2018)
- Blood & Stone (October 23, 2020)
- Truth Killer (July 28, 2023)
- One (May 1, 2026)

=== Still Rain ===
- Still Rain
- Bitter Black Water

=== Dark New Day ===
- Twelve Year Silence (June 14, 2005)
- Black Porch (Acoustic Sessions) (September 5, 2006)
- New Tradition (February 28, 2012)
- Hail Mary (February 19, 2013)

=== Call Me No One ===
- Last Parade (June 5, 2012)

=== Guest appearances ===
- Digital Summer - Breaking Point - guitar on "Forget You"
- Brookroyal - Jump - guitar on "Jump"
- 3 Years Hollow - The Cracks - guitar on "The Cracks"
- Statik Silence - "Killer Instinct" - acoustic guitar on "Killer Instinct"
- Interleaved - "Condescend" (feat. Clint Lowery)
- Maks Gabriel - "I Mean This (Cinematic Remix)"
