= Souls Harbor =

Former American heavy metal band

- Origin: Beaufort, South Carolina, USA
- Genres: Alternative metal, hard rock, heavy metal, post-grunge
- Years active: 2001–present
- Labels: Crash Music
- Past members: Doug Marshall; Tony Bigley; Jonathan Fenin; Rob Cadiz; Ryland Underwood; Alan Price; Eric Rickert; Justin Long

Souls Harbor was an American heavy metal band based in Beaufort, South Carolina.

The band originated on the USS John F. Kennedy (CV-67), while Doug Marshall, Jonathan Fenin and Rob Cadiz were in the United States Marine Corps. They formed the band in late 1999 while on cruise in the Persian Gulf.

The band won the 2002 and 2003 South Carolina/Georgia Battle of the Bands.

They released their first full-length album, Writing on the Wall, in 2006, signed under the record label Crash Music Inc. The album was produced by Shinedown's bassist, Eric Bass.

Writing on the Wall was compared to material by the alternative metal band, Sevendust. "Sevendust are a definite influence; 'For Me,' for example, packs a funky alterna-metal punch that has Sevendust written all over it," wrote Alex Henderson for AllMusic.

In 2008 the band released the EP Take No Thought of the Morrow. A Tunelab review said it was "a completely new and different sound for Souls Harbor, and one that works out victoriously six different times." The album was produced by Eric Bass and Corey Lowery.

The band spent ten months recording with Rick Beato (Shinedown, Bullet for my Valentine), putting together the album Anxiety Society, which they hope to be a major label release.

In the early months of 2011 Souls Harbor lost two of its key members, Jonathan Fenin and Tony Bigley. Fenin left to devote his time to his successful career in the motion picture industry.

In November 2011 it was announced that Tony Bigley had joined the metal band Defiler from East San Francisco, California.

== Band members ==
- Doug Marshall – vocals (2001–present)

== Past band members ==
- Tony Bigley – guitar (2001–2011)
- Jonathan Fenin – guitar (2001–2011)
- Thomas Keneally – bass (2000–2003, toured in 2011)
- Alan Price – bass (2010–2012)
- Ryland Underwood – bass (2003–2010)
- Rob Cadiz – drums (2005–2007)
- Justin Long – drums (2008–2012)
