= Skunk Anansie discography =

- Skunk Anansie in concert at the Brighton Concorde 2
- Studio albums: 7
- Live albums: 2
- Compilation albums: 1
- Singles: 24
- Music videos: 24

The discography of Skunk Anansie, an English rock band, consists of seven studio albums and twenty-four singles, including one re-issue. The band's members include Skin (Deborah Dyer), Cass (Richard Lewis), Ace (Martin Kent) and Mark Richardson. The group formed in 1994 and disbanded in 2001; they re-united in 2009. Skunk Anansie are named after the West African folk tales of Anansi the Spider-man, with "Skunk" added to "make the name nastier".

In 1995, Skunk Anansie released their debut album, Paranoid and Sunburnt, on the One Little Indian record label. It was recorded with Robbie France on drums, who left before the album was released. Mark Richardson replaced France. The album peaked at number eight on the UK albums chart and was certified Platinum in their native United Kingdom with a Gold certification in the Netherlands; the band also won the Kerrang! Award for "Best British Band" in the same year. Paranoid and Sunburnt spawned two top 20 singles in the United Kingdom: "Weak" and a re-issue of "Charity", which had previously made the top 40.

One year after the release of their debut, Skunk Anansie released Stoosh, which was certified gold in several European countries, with a Platinum certification in Italy and also became their second UK album to be certified Platinum, while peaking at number nine on the UK album charts. Stoosh spawned their highest-charting singles, which included "Hedonism (Just Because You Feel Good)", which reached the top 20 in several European countries. "Brazen (Weep)" from the same album became their highest-charting UK single, peaking at number 11. European sales for the album stand at two million. Skunk Anansie released Post Orgasmic Chill on Virgin in 1999. The album was certified Platinum by the International Federation of the Phonographic Industry (IFPI) for selling more than 1 million units in Europe and the UK. The album was multi-platinum in both Italy and Portugal.

2009 saw the band re-unite, with the single releases of "Because of You" and "Squander", from the compilation Smashes and Trashes. The album was certified Gold in Poland and Italy while also making the top 10 in Portugal. Skunk Anansie's first studio album after the reunion, Wonderlustre, was released internationally on 13 September 2010. Despite debuting at number 1 in Italy, the album charted moderately in many European territories and became their first studio album to miss the UK top 40. Wonderlustre spawned the singles "My Ugly Boy", "Over the Love" and "You Saved Me". In 2012, the band released the album Black Traffic, which reached the top 10 in Italy and Switzerland. Their sixth studio album, Anarchytecture, was released on 15 January 2016.

In July 2019, Skunk Anansie released the single "What You Do for Love". A video for the song was also released.

== Albums ==
=== Studio albums ===
Title	Album details	Peak chart positions										Certifications (sales thresholds)
Title	Album details	UK	AUS	AUT	BEL	GER	ITA	NL	POL	SWE	SWI	Certifications (sales thresholds)
Paranoid & Sunburnt	Released: 18 September 1995; Label: One Little Indian (TPLP55); Format: CD, CD+DVD-V, CS, DL, LP	8	61	19	8	37	—	22	—	7	—	UK: Platinum; NL: Gold
Stoosh	Released: 7 October 1996; Label: One Little Indian (TPLP85); Format: CD, CD+DVD-V, CS, DL, LP	9	37	6	14	11	15	5	—	18	8	UK: Platinum; AUT: Gold; GER: Gold; ITA: Platinum; NL: Gold; SWE: Gold; SWI: Gold
Post Orgasmic Chill	Released: 22 March 1999; Label: Virgin (V2881); Format: CD, CS, DL, LP, MD	16	56	6	6	5	2	10	—	31	10	UK: Gold; AUT: Gold; SWI: Gold; EU: Platinum
Wonderlustre	Released: 13 September 2010; Label: V2 (VVNL21652); Format: CD, CD+DVD-V DL, LP	58	—	33	8	27	1	12	9	—	11	ITA: Gold; POL: Gold
Black Traffic	Released: 17 September 2012; Format: CD, CD+DVD-V, DL, LP	42	—	28	30	33	2	32	11	—	7	
Anarchytecture	Released: 15 January 2016; Label: Boogooyamma; Format: CD, DL, LP	85	—	48	25	52	5	37	8	—	11	
The Painful Truth	Released: 23 May 2025; Format: CD, DL, LP	7	—	38	—	58	—	—	—	—	—	
"—" denotes releases that did not chart or were not released in that country.

=== Live albums ===
Title	Album details	Peak chart positions							
Title	Album details	UK	BEL	GER	ITA	NL	POL	POR	SWI
An Acoustic Skunk Anansie (Live in London)	Released: 23 September 2013; Label: Boogooyamma; Format: CD+DVD, Blu-ray	—	16	—	21	28	16	30	87
25Live@25	Released: 25 January 2019; Label: Republic of Music	99	55	64	93	—	34	—	53
"—" denotes releases that did not chart or were not released in that country.

=== Compilation albums ===
Title	Album details	Peak chart positions									Certifications
Title	Album details	UK	AUT	BEL	GER	ITA	NL	POL	POR	SWI	Certifications
Smashes and Trashes	Released: 2 November 2009; Label: One Little Indian (#986); Format: CD (+DVD), LP, limited box set, digital download	74	44	22	53	12	30	47	8	31	ITA: Gold; POL: Gold

== Singles ==
Title	Year	Peak chart positions										Album
Title	Year	UK	AUS	AUT	BEL	GER	ITA	NOR	NL	SWE	SWI	Album
"Little Baby Swastikkka" [promo] ^{[I]}	1995	—	—	—	—	—	—	—	—	—	—	Paranoid and Sunburnt
"Selling Jesus"	1995	46	—	—	—	—	—	—	—	—	—	Paranoid and Sunburnt
"I Can Dream"	1995	41	60	—	—	—	—	—	—	—	—	Paranoid and Sunburnt
"Charity"	1995	40	—	—	—	—	—	—	—	—	—	Paranoid and Sunburnt
"Weak"	1996	20	105	—	—	—	—	—	31	12	—	Paranoid and Sunburnt
"Charity" (re-issue)	1996	20	—	—	—	—	—	—	—	—	—	Paranoid and Sunburnt
"All I Want"	1996	14	80	—	—	—	—	—	—	58	—	Stoosh
"Twisted (Everyday Hurts)"	1996	26	82	—	—	—	—	—	100	—	—	Stoosh
"Hedonism (Just Because You Feel Good)"	1997	13	—	11	—	12	—	8	6	18	2	Stoosh
"Brazen (Weep)"	1997	11	—	—	—	—	—	—	48	—	—	Stoosh
"Charlie Big Potato"	1999	17	72	—	61	96	20	—	59	—	—	Post Orgasmic Chill
"Secretly"	1999	16	—	—	64	—	5	—	30	—	—	Post Orgasmic Chill
"Lately"	1999	33	—	—	—	—	—	—	80	—	—	Post Orgasmic Chill
"You'll Follow Me Down"	1999	—	—	—	—	—	17	—	—	—	—	Post Orgasmic Chill
"Tear the Place Up" [promo]	2009	—	—	—	—	—	—	—	—	—	—	Smashes and Trashes
"Because of You"	2009	—	—	—	—	—	10	—	—	—	—	Smashes and Trashes
"Squander"	2009	—	—	—	67	—	—	—	—	—	—	Smashes and Trashes
"My Ugly Boy"	2010	—	—	—	—	—	15	—	—	—	—	Wonderlustre
"Talk Too Much"/"Over the Love"	2010	—	—	—	58	—	—	—	—	—	—	Wonderlustre
"You Saved Me"	2011	—	—	—	—	—	—	—	—	—	—	Wonderlustre
"I Believed in You"	2012	—	—	—	—	—	—	—	—	—	—	Black Traffic
"I Hope You Get to Meet Your Hero"	2012	—	—	—	—	—	—	—	—	—	—	Black Traffic
"This Is Not a Game"	2013	—	—	—	—	—	—	—	—	—	—	Black Traffic
"Love Someone Else"	2015	—	—	—	—	—	30	—	—	—	—	Anarchytecture
"Death to the Lovers"	2016	—	—	—	—	—	—	—	—	—	—	Anarchytecture
"Without You"	2016	—	—	—	—	—	—	—	—	—	—	Anarchytecture
"What You Do for Love"	2019	—	—	—	—	—	—	—	—	—	—	Non-Album singles
"This Means War"	2020	—	—	—	—	—	—	—	—	—	—	Non-Album singles
"Piggy"	2022	—	—	—	—	—	—	—	—	—	—	Non-Album singles
"Can't Take You Anywhere"	2022	—	—	—	—	—	—	—	—	—	—	Non-Album singles
"An Artist Is An Artist"	2025	—	—	—	—	—	—	—	—	—	—	The Painful Truth
"Cheers"	2025	—	—	—	—	—	—	—	—	—	—	The Painful Truth
"Lost and Found"	2025	—	—	—	—	—	—	—	—	—	—	The Painful Truth
"Animal"	2025	—	—	—	—	—	—	—	—	—	—	The Painful Truth
"Shame"	2025	—	—	—	—	—	—	—	—	—	—	The Painful Truth
"—" denotes releases that did not chart, were not released in that country or were ineligible.

Notes

- ILimited-edition vinyl promotional release.

== Other appearances ==
Song	Year	Compilation or single	Notes
"Army of Me" (Sucker Punch Remix)	1995	"Army of Me" single by Björk	Released as track four on CD2 of the single release, including the Japanese edition
"Feed"	1995	Strange Days soundtrack	Compilation exclusive
"Black Skin Sexuality"	1996	Tonnage Volume 2	Compilation exclusive
"Tracy's Flaw" and "You'll Follow Me Down"	2000	Pavarotti & Friends for Cambodia and Tibet	Collaborations with Luciano Pavarotti as part of the Pavarotti and Friends concert
"I've Had Enough"	2011	Download-only track	Available only to holders of a fan club card.
"Search and Destroy"	2011	Sucker Punch Original Motion Picture Soundtrack	Compilation exclusive, originally recorded by The Stooges.

== Music videos ==
Title	Year	Director
"Selling Jesus"	1995	Gob TV
"I Can Dream"	1995	Gob TV
"Selling Jesus" (Strange Days Version)	1995	Kathryn Bigelow
"Charity"	1995	David Mould
"Weak"	1996	Hammer & Tongs
"All I Want"	1996	Stephen Norrington
"Twisted (Everyday Hurts)"	1996	Anton Beebe
"Hedonism (Just Because You Feel Good)"	1997	Thomas Krygier
"Brazen (Weep)"	1997	Thomas Krygier
"Charlie Big Potato"	1999	Giuseppe Capotondi
"Secretly"	1999	Giuseppe Capotondi
"Lately"	1999	Howard Greenhalgh
"You'll Follow Me Down"	1999	Thomas Krygier
"Tear the Place Up"	2009	Adam Powell
"Because of You"	2009	Shotopop
"Squander"	2009	Hope Audikana
"My Ugly Boy"	2010	Paul Street
"Over the Love"	2010	Mark Richardson
"Talk Too Much"	2011	
"You Saved Me"	2011	Ben Foley
"I Believed in You"	2012	Thomas Hicks
"I Hope You Get to Meet Your Hero"	2012	Loran Dunn
"Spit You Out"	2013	Sylvain Tardiveau
"This Is Not a Game"	2013	Lore&Jun
"Love Someone Else"	2015	Isaac Tomiczek
"Victim"	2016	Mark Richardson
"What You Do For Love"	2019	
"This Means War"	2020	
