= Smashes and Trashes =

Greatest hits album by Skunk Anansie
- Released: 14 September 2009
- Recorded: 1994–2009
- Genre: Alternative rock; punk rock; indie rock; alternative metal; hard rock
- Label: One Little Indian; Virgin

Skunk Anansie chronology
| Post Orgasmic Chill (1999) | Smashes and Trashes (2009) | Wonderlustre (2010) |

Singles from Smashes and Trashes
- 1. "Tear the Place Up" Released: 3 July 2009 (Music video and free download only); 2. "Because of You" Released: 14 September 2009; 3. "Squander" Released: 9 November 2009

Professional ratings
Review scores
| Source | Rating |
|---|---|
| AllMusic | 4/5 stars |
| MusicOMH | 3.5/5 stars |

Smashes and Trashes is a greatest hits album by the British rock band Skunk Anansie. It is a 15-track career-embracing album and includes three previously unreleased tracks; "Tear the Place Up", "Because of You" and "Squander". The bonus track edition includes acoustic versions of "Weak" and "Because of You". This is the band's first new material since splitting in 2001. The album was released surrounding a greatest hits tour around Europe.

On 3 July 2009, the music video for "Tear the Place Up" was posted on My Space. On 10 August 2009 a new video and song, "Because of You", was presented exclusively on Kerrang.com. It was released on 14 September 2009 in the UK, with "Squander" following on 9 November 2009. In 2010. It was awarded a silver certification from the Independent Music Companies Association which indicated sales of at least 30,000 copies throughout Europe.

In Italy the album was certified Gold by the Federation of the Italian Music Industry for sales in excess of 30,000 copies.

== Track listing ==
| No. | Title | Length |
|---|---|---|
| 1. | "Charlie Big Potato" | 5:32 |
| 2. | "I Can Dream" | 3:35 |
| 3. | "Hedonism (Just Because You Feel Good)" | 3:28 |
| 4. | "Tear the Place Up" | 2:59 |
| 5. | "Weak" | 3:33 |
| 6. | "Secretly" | 4:47 |
| 7. | "Because of You" | 4:28 |
| 8. | "All I Want" | 3:54 |
| 9. | "Brazen (Weep)" | 4:33 |
| 10. | "Twisted (Everyday Hurts)" | 4:14 |
| 11. | "Squander" | 4:29 |
| 12. | "Lately" | 3:55 |
| 13. | "Selling Jesus" | 3:51 |
| 14. | "Charity" | 4:38 |
| 15. | "You'll Follow Me Down" | 4:03 |
| 16. | "Weak" (acoustic version; bonus track edition only) | 3:13 |
| 17. | "Because of You" (acoustic version; bonus track edition only) | 4:18 |

== Charts ==
Chart performance for Smashes and Trashes
| Chart (2009) | Peak position |
|---|---|
| Austrian Albums (Ö3 Austria) | 44 |
| Belgian Albums (Ultratop Flanders) | 22 |
| Belgian Albums (Ultratop Wallonia) | 53 |
| Dutch Albums (Album Top 100) | 30 |
| German Albums (Offizielle Top 100) | 53 |
| Italian Albums (FIMI) | 12 |
| Portuguese Albums (AFP) | 8 |
| Scottish Albums (Official Charts) | 87 |
| Swiss Albums (Schweizer Hitparade) | 31 |
| UK Albums (Official Charts) | 74 |
| UK Album Downloads (Official Charts) | 57 |
| UK Independent Albums (Official Charts) | 8 |
