= Skin discography =

Recordings by British singer

Skin is the lead singer of Skunk Anansie and a solo artist. She has released two albums as a solo artist and featured on several other artists albums. For Skunk Anansie's full discography, see Skunk Anansie discography.

This discography features Skin's main releases across Europe.

== Studio albums ==
| Title | Details | Peak chart positions | | | | | | | |
| Title | Details | UK | AUT | BEL (FL) | BEL (WA) | GER | ITA | NLD | SWI |
|---|---|---|---|---|---|---|---|---|---|
| Fleshwounds | Released: 9 September 2003; Label: EMI; Format: CD, cassette | 43 | 42 | 40 | 50 | 18 | 6 | 56 | 13 |
| Fake Chemical State | Released: 20 March 2006; Label: V2; Format: CD, cassette | 176 | 44 | 60 | 75 | 67 | 21 | 43 | 8 |

== Singles ==
| Title | Year | Peak chart positions | | | | Album |
| Title | Year | UK | ITA | NLD | SWI | Album |
|---|---|---|---|---|---|---|
| "Trashed" | 2003 | 30 | 6 | 96 | 98 | Fleshwounds |
| "Faithfulness" | 2003 | 64 | 17 | 99 | — | Fleshwounds |
| "Lost"/"Getting Away with It" | 2003 | — | — | — | — | Fleshwounds |
| "Alone in My Room" | 2005 | — | — | — | — | Fake Chemical State |
| "Just Let the Sun" | 2006 | — | 9 | 51 | 88 | Fake Chemical State |
| "Purple" (Note: "Purple" was only released in the Netherlands and Italy. It was set for release across Europe but "Nothing But" was scheduled instead.) | 2006 | — | — | — | — | Fake Chemical State |
| "Tear Down These Houses" | 2008 | — | 7 | — | — | Parlami d'amore |

== Appearances ==
As a solo artist, Skin has worked with various other artists and provided her work for sound tracks.

| Title | Notes |
|---|---|
| "Licking Cream" | By Sevendust from their album Home. Skin features on track 1 and 2 of the single and track 8 of the album. |
| "It's Only Rock 'n' Roll" | Skin features amongst the likes of Sir Paul McCartney and the Rolling Stones on this charity single. |
| "Comfort of Strangers" | Skin features on the track "Comfort of Strangers" from the OST of the English film Timecode. The track is number 2. |
| "Carmen Queasy" | Skin features on the track "Carmen Queasy" from Maxim's album Hell's Kitchen. It is track 3 on the album. |
| "Meat" | Skin features on the track "Meat" from Tony Iommi's album Iommi. It is track 2 on the album. |
| "Stagioni d'amore" | Skin features on the track "Stagioni d'amore" from the OST of the film Rent. The track is known as "Seasons of Love" in English. |
| "Burning Shed" | Skin features on the track "Burning Shed" from the OST of the film Hotel. |
| "La canzone che scrivo per te" | Skin features on the track "La canzone che scrivo per te" from Italian band Marlene Kuntz's album Che Cosa Vedi. |
| "You Can't Find Peace" | Skin features on the track "You Can't Find Peace" by Pale3, from the OST to Der Krieger und die Kaiserin (The Princess and the Warrior) |
| "Good Times" | Skin features on the track "Good Times" by Ed Case, from his album Ed's Guests. It reached No. 49 in the UK. |
| "Mayhem" | Skin features on the track "Mayhem" by Ed Case, from his album Ed's Guests. It is a hidden track. |
| "Still Standing" | Skin features on the track "Still Standing" with Brian Eno and Rachid Taha from the Official Athens 2004 Olympic Games album. The track is number 15. |
| "Kill Everything" | Skin features on the track "Kill Everything" from the OST of French film L'Empire des Loups. |
| "Simmer Down" | Skin features on the track "Simmer Down" with Robot Club and Adi Tribe from the album Bruce Parry Presents Amazon Tribe – Songs for Survival. The track is number 9 on disc 1. |
| "How Does It End" | Skin features on the track "How Does It End" from the OST of English film The Truth About Love. |
| "Last1con" | Skin features on the unpublished track "Last1con" by Boosta from Italian band Subsonica. |
| "Not an Addict" | Stripped-back re-recording of "Not an Addict" featuring Skin, who had previously performed the song live with the group on several occasions. |
