= You'll Follow Me Down =

Single by Skunk Anansie

from the album Post Orgasmic Chill
- B-side: "Hedonism" (Live)
- Released: 25 October 1999
- Genre: Indie rock
- Length: 3:29
- Label: Virgin (UK)
- Songwriters: Skin, Len Arran
- Producer: Skunk Anansie. Clif Norrell

Skunk Anansie singles chronology
"Lately" (1999)	"You'll Follow Me Down" (1999)	"Tear the Place Up" (2009)

"You'll Follow Me Down" is a song by Skunk Anansie, released as the final single from Post Orgasmic Chill. It was released in October 1999 and was the last release from the band – until their 2009 reunion. The CD was released as a limited, numbered edition to mark the end of the band.

== Music video ==
The music video was directed by Thomas Krygier

== Track listing ==
=== CD single ===
No.	Title	Length
1.	"You'll Follow Me Down"	3:29
2.	"Hedonism (Just Because You Feel Good) – Live"	3:55
3.	"The Skank Heads – Live"	3:10
4.	"You'll Follow Me Down (Rollo and Sister Bliss [from Faithless] Mix)"	3:29
5.	"You'll Follow Me Down (Golden Ashes Mix)"	7:55
Total length:		21:58

== Chart ==
You'll Follow Me Down was ineligible to chart the UK Singles charts because of regulations for chart inclusion said that a CD must be under 20 minutes long if more than one track, including remixes, is featured. This CD featured three tracks and two remixes which made it ineligible.
