= Lately (Skunk Anansie song) =

1999 single by Skunk Anansie

Single by Skunk Anansie

from the album Post Orgasmic Chill
- B-side: "Decadence of Your Starvation"; "The Pill's Too Painful"
- Released: 26 July 1999
- Length: 3:53
- Label: Virgin
- Songwriters: Skin; Len Arran
- Producers: Skunk Anansie; Clif Norrell

Skunk Anansie singles chronology
"Secretly" (1999)	"Lately" (1999)	"You'll Follow Me Down" (1999)

"Lately" is a song by British rock band Skunk Anansie, released as the third single from their third studio album, Post Orgasmic Chill (1999). It was released in July 1999. CD1 of the single comes with an interactive element featuring the video, and CD2 features three exclusive Polaroid pictures of the band. As of 2026, it is the band's last major hit, charting at number 33 in their native United Kingdom and number two in Iceland.

== Music video ==
The surreal music video was directed by Howard Greenhalgh. The video shows the band performing in a small town where all its maladjusted inhabitants are deformedly smiling while a comet (played by Skin) begins to have a collision course with Earth, killing everyone in the neighborhood. The video for the single was a homage to Soundgarden's music video for "Black Hole Sun", which was also directed by Greenhalgh in 1994.

== Track listings ==
CD1

No.	Title	Length
1.	"Lately"	3:53
2.	"Decadence of Your Starvation"	3:37
3.	"Charlie Big Potato (Smokin' Jo Skin Up mix)"	6:25
4.	"Interactive Section"	N/A
Total length:		13:55

CD2

No.	Title	Length
1.	"Lately"	3:53
2.	"The Pill's Too Painful"	3:59
3.	"Secretly (Armand Van Helden mix)"	7:40
Total length:		15:32

== Charts ==
Chart (1999)	Peak position
Europe (Eurochart Hot 100)	94
Iceland (Íslenski Listinn Topp 40)	2
Netherlands (Single Top 100)	80
Scottish Singles Sales (Official Charts)	23
UK Singles (Official Charts)	33
