= Len Arran =

English composer and songwriter

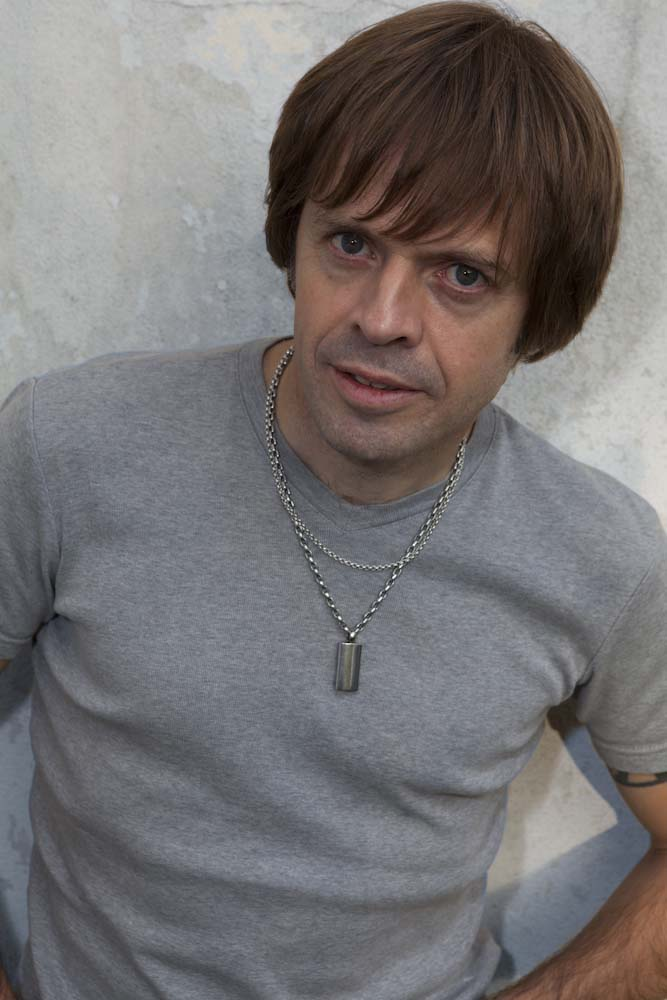
Len Arran

Len Arran (born Leonard Arran, 7 June 1961, Thornaby-on-Tees, England) is an English composer of film scores, and songwriter for Skunk Anansie and solo artist Deborah Dyer (Skin).

He began his career as a guitarist in London in the late 1980s. In 1991, he developed a writing partnership with Dyer, leading to the formation of rock band Skunk Anansie.

From 1994 onwards, they produced eight Top 40 singles, including "Hedonism (Just Because You Feel Good)", "Twisted" and "Brazen (Weep)", and three gold/platinum albums: Paranoid and Sunburnt (1995), Stoosh (1997) and Post Orgasmic Chill (1999). 2004 saw the release of songs for Skin's first Solo Album, Fleshwounds on EMI followed by her second solo album, Fake Chemical State (V2 Music) released in March 2006.

The huge hit song Secretly was used in the film Cruel Intentions (1999), along with other tracks for the films Strange Days (1995), Mission: Impossible (1998), The Avengers (1998), and other television credits in Europe and America.

Arran has composed music for many computer games, including the Sony Entertainment PC game Tellurian Defence. He has scored music for several Irish short films, in addition to music for "Simon Community" TV commercials.

He has scored films including the award-winning A Dublin Story (2003), and Push Hands (2004), Past Pupil (2005) and L'Empire des loups (2005). Other works include the British romantic comedy The Truth About Love (2006), the Shimmy Marcus/Paul Davey documentary "[Breaking Boundaries]"(2008) and the latest feature from Shimmy Marcus, Soulboy.

In 2009 the film New Boy (film) (2007), scored by Arran was nominated for an Oscar at the 81st Academy Awards (2009).

He has recently written for singers J Marie Cooper and Indie Murton both of whom appeared on BBC show The Voice UK (series 1) 2012, and played guitar with Skunk Anansie for European acoustic shows in April 2013, recorded for a live DVD in summer of 2013.

Arran lives on the island of Gozo in Malta.
