= Brazen (Weep) =

1997 single by Skunk Anansie

Single by Skunk Anansie

from the album Stoosh
- B-side: "Twisted (Everyday Hurts)"; "All I Want"; "It Takes Blood and Guts"; (live)
- Released: 2 June 1997
- Length: 4:31
- Label: One Little Indian
- Songwriters: Skin, Cass, Ace
- Producers: GGGarth, Skunk Anansie

Skunk Anansie singles chronology
| "Hedonism (Just Because You Feel Good)" (1997) | "Brazen (Weep)" (1997) | "Charlie Big Potato" (1999) |

"Brazen (Weep)" is the fourth and final single from British rock band Skunk Anansie's second album, Stoosh (1996). It was released on 2 June 1997 and reached number 11 on the UK singles chart, making the song the band's most successful hit in their home country. In Iceland, it peaked at number one, ending 1997 as the year's third-most-successful single. Three versions of the single were released; CD2 and CD3 are remix CDs.

== Music video ==
The video was directed by Thomas Krygier, who directed the video for "Hedonism". The video shows the band becoming attacked in a red room (hinted to be a mental hospital). The video ends with Skin waking up in a street, implying that it was a dream after she presumably fell on the ground unconscious or run over by a car, but with no injuries.

== Track listing ==
=== CD single – CD1 ===
| No. | Title | Length |
|---|---|---|
| 1. | "Brazen (Weep)" | 4:31 |
| 2. | "Twisted (Everyday Hurts) – BBC Radio 1 Session" | 4:13 |
| 3. | "All I Want – BBC Radio 1 session" | 3:44 |
| 4. | "It Takes Blood and Guts – BBC Radio 1 session" | 4:09 |
| Total length: | | 16:37 |

=== CD single – CD2 ===
| No. | Title | Length |
|---|---|---|
| 1. | "Brazen (Weep) (Dreadzone Remix)" | 9:20 |
| 2. | "Brazen (Weep) (Hani's Weeping Club Mix)" | 10:48 |
| 3. | "Brazen (Weep) (Ventura's Underworld Mix)" | 4:07 |
| 4. | "Brazen (Weep) (Stealth Sonic Orchestra Remix)" | 4:51 |
| 5. | "Brazen (Weep) (Electro Mix)" | 4:49 |
| Total length: | | 33:55 |

=== CD single – CD3 ===
| No. | Title | Length |
|---|---|---|
| 1. | "Brazen Weep (Junior's Arena Anthem)" | 9:37 |
| 2. | "Brazen Weep (Perfecto Mix)" | 7:15 |
| 3. | "Brazen Weep (Dreadzone's Instrumental Mix)" | 9:22 |
| 4. | "Brazen Weep (Jr's Riff Dub)" | 7:29 |
| 5. | "Brazen Weep (Hani's Hydro Instrumental Mix)" | 5:39 |
| Total length: | | 39:22 |

== Charts ==
=== Weekly charts ===
| Chart (1997) | Peak position |
|---|---|
| Europe (Eurochart Hot 100) | 42 |
| Iceland (Íslenski Listinn Topp 40) | 1 |
| Netherlands (Dutch Top 40) | 19 |
| Netherlands (Single Top 100) | 48 |
| Scottish Singles Sales (Official Charts) | 12 |
| UK Singles (Official Charts) | 11 |
| UK Indie (OCC) | 1 |

=== Year-end charts ===
| Chart (1997) | Position |
|---|---|
| Iceland (Íslenski Listinn Topp 40) | 3 |
