= Trashed (Skin song) =

Single by Skin

from the album Fleshwounds
- Released: 26 May 2003
- Length: 4:19
- Label: EMI
- Songwriter(s): Skin, Len Arran
- Producer(s): Marius De Vries

Skin singles chronology
"Trashed" (2003)	"Faithfulness" (2003)

Alternate DVD Cover
- Trashed DVD Cover

"Trashed" is the debut solo single by Skunk Anansie frontwoman Skin. The single was released on 26 May 2003 and taken from Skin's 2003 debut solo album, Fleshwounds. It was released as a CD single and DVD single.

== Track listings ==
UK 7 inch single

A. "Trashed"
B. "The Girl Who Never Cries"

UK CD single

1. "Trashed"
2. "On and On"
3. "Video Interview"

UK DVD single

1. "Trashed" (video)
2. "On and On" (audio)
3. "The Girl Who Never Cries" (audio)

== Charts ==
Chart (2003)	Peak position
Europe (Eurochart Hot 100)	80
Italy (FIMI)	6
Netherlands (Single Top 100)	96
Scotland (OCC)	28
Switzerland (Schweizer Hitparade)	98
UK Singles (OCC)	30
