= Giuseppe Capotondi =

Italian director

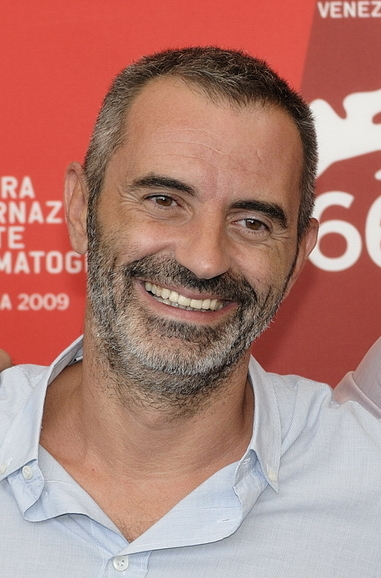
- Born: 1 January 1968 (age 58); Corinaldo, Italy
- Occupation: Film director

Giuseppe Capotondi (born 1 January 1968) is an Italian director of feature films, music videos and commercials signed to Oil Factory in the United States and Factory Films in the United Kingdom. Before signing with Factory Films, he worked with Battlecruiser and Soixan7e Quin5e.

Capotondi's feature-length debut, The Double Hour starring Filippo Timi and Kseniya Rappoport, was released on 6 November 2009 after premiering in competition in the Venice Film Festival that September.

== Videography ==
- Negrita - "Rumore" (1994)
- Zucchero - "Papà Perchè" (1995)
- Ligabue - "Certe notti" (1995)
- Ligabue - "Viva!" (1995)
- Mietta - "Oggi Dani è più felice" (1995)
- Soon - Il Fiume (1996)
- Furslide - "Over my head" (1998)
- Skunk Anansie - "Charlie Big Potato" (1999)
- Skunk Anansie - "Secretly" (1999)
- Melanie C - "Goin' Down" (1999)
- Our Lady Peace - "Is Anybody Home?" (1999)
- Sunna - "Power Struggle" (2000)
- Pale 3 featuring Skin - "You can't find peace" (2000)
- Bush - "Inflatable" (2002)
- Emma Bunton - "I'll Be There" (2003)
- Amy Studt - "Under the Thumb" (2003)
- Kelis featuring Andre 3000 - "Millionaire" (2004)
- Skin - "Lost" (2005)
- Natalie Imbruglia - "Counting down the days" (2005)
- Ms. Dynamite - "Judgement Day" (2005)
- Keane - "Crystal ball" (2006)
- Keane - "Nothing in My Way" (2006)

== Filmography ==
=== Film and television ===
- The Double Hour (2009 film, director)
- Endeavour (British TV series, director of the Season 2 episode "Nocturne", 2014)
- Berlin Station (American TV series, director of four episodes, 2016–2017)
- Suburra: Blood on Rome (Italian TV series, director of four episodes, 2017)
- The Burnt Orange Heresy (2019 film, director)

=== Commercials ===
- BMW / Mini
- Tam Oil
- BMW / 1 Series
- Findus
- Costa Cruises
- Grolsch / Kidnapped
