= Capotondi =

Capotondi is an Italian surname. Notable people with the surname include:

- Cristiana Capotondi (born 1980), Italian actress
- Giuseppe Capotondi (born 1968), Italian director
