= The Trouble with Me =

The Trouble with Me may refer to:

- "The Trouble with Me", a 2005 song by Robbie Williams from Intensive Care
- "The Trouble with Me", a 2003 song by Skin from Fleshwounds
