= The Painful Truth =

Studio album by Skunk Anansie
- Released: 23 May 2025
- Studios: Federal Prism, Los Angeles
- Length: 37:55
- Label: FLG
- Producers: David Andrew Sitek; Hudson Mohawke

Skunk Anansie chronology
Anarchytecture (2016)	The Painful Truth (2025)

Singles from The Painful Truth
- 1. "An Artist Is An Artist" Released: 13 January 2025; 2. "Cheers" Released: 26 February 2025; 3. "Lost and Found" Released: 7 April 2025; 4. "Animal" Released: 30 April 2025; 5. "Shame" Released: 10 July 2025

The Painful Truth is the seventh studio album by English band Skunk Anansie. It was released on 23 May 2025 by FLG Records.

== Background ==
On 26 February 2025, Skunk Anansie, alongside producer David Sitek, announced the release of their new studio album The Painful Truth.

== Critical reception ==
Professional ratings
Aggregate scores
Source	Rating
Metacritic	79/100
Review scores
Source	Rating
Classic Rock	3.5/5 stars
The Guardian	4/5 stars
Kerrang!	4/5 stars
Metal Hammer	4/5 stars
MusicOMH	3.5/5 stars

The Painful Truth was met with "generally favorable" reviews from critics. At Metacritic, which assigns a weighted average rating out of 100 to reviews from mainstream publications, this release received an average score of 79, based on 6 reviews.

== Track listing ==
All tracks are written by Skunk Anansie and David Andrew Sitek except where noted.

The Painful Truth track listing
No.	Title	Writer(s)	Length
1.	"An Artist Is an Artist"		3:11
2.	"This Is Not Your Life"		3:24
3.	"Shame"		4:06
4.	"Lost and Found"	Skin; Sitek	4:15
5.	"Cheers"		3:26
6.	"Shoulda Been You"		3:50
7.	"Animal"		4:07
8.	"Fell in Love With a Girl"		4:27
9.	"My Greatest Moment"	Skin; Sitek; Daniel Ledinsky; Hudson Mohawke	3:43
10.	"Meltdown"		3:26

== Personnel ==
- Skin – vocals and backing vocals, keyboards, echo
- Cass – bass
- Ace – guitar
- Mark Richardson – drums, percussion, Pulsar
- David Andrew Sitek – guitars, keyboards
- Charlie Coffeen – keyboards on "Lost and Found", "Meltdown"
- Patrick Siroishi – horns on "An Artist Is an Artist"

Technical

- David Andrew Sitek – producer (all tracks), recording
- Hudson Mohawke – producer ("My Greatest Moment")
- Derek Coburn – recording
- Elizaveta Boldyreva – recording
- Matty Green at Studio 55 – mixing
- Ted Jensen at Sterling Sound, Nashville – mastering

Visual

- Stylorouge – design and art direction
- Dan Abbott – front cover illlustration
- Rob O'Connor – photography
- Kim Howells – styling
- Daniel Kolaric – make up

== Charts ==
Chart performance for The Painful Truth
Chart (2025)	Peak position
Austrian Albums (Ö3 Austria)	38
Belgian Albums (Ultratop Wallonia)	180
German Albums (Offizielle Top 100)	58
Scottish Albums (Official Charts)	6
Swiss Albums (Schweizer Hitparade)	17
UK Albums (Official Charts)	7
UK Album Downloads (Official Charts)	5
UK Independent Albums (Official Charts)	3
