= Faithfulness (song) =

Single by Skin

from the album Fleshwounds
- Released: September 2003
- Label: EMI (UK)
- Songwriter(s): Skin, Len Arran
- Producer(s): David Kosten, Flo

Skin singles chronology
| "Trashed" (2003) | "Faithfulness" (2003) | "Lost"/"Getting Away with It" (2003) |

"Faithfulness" is a song by Skunk Anansie frontwoman Skin, released in September 2003 as the second single from her debut solo album Fleshwounds. It reached No. 17 in Italy and in Spain, No. 64 on the UK Singles Chart and No. 99 in the Netherlands.

== Track listing ==
UK CD single

1. "Faithfulness" (Radio Mix)
2. "Faithfulness" (Scumfrog Mix)

UK DVD single

1. "Faithfulness" (Video)
2. "Faithfulness" (Kinky Boy Rock Goth Mix - Audio)
3. "Faithfulness" (Moonbootica Mix - Audio)
