= Purple (Skin song) =

Single by Skin
- Released: 2006
- Label: V2 RecordsV2 Records (UK)
- Songwriters: Skin, Gary Clark (musician)
- Producers: Skin, Gordon Raphael

Skin singles chronology
"Just Let the Sun" (2006)	"Purple" (2006)

"Purple" is the third release from Skin's second album Fake Chemical State. It has only been released on CD in The Netherlands. A download EP is available to most audiences. The CD single features live-acoustic tracks from a radio broadcast for NPO 3FM in The Netherlands.

== Track listing ==
=== CD single ===
1. Purple
2. Just Let the Sun (Live Acoustic)
3. Purple (Live Acoustic)
4. Hedonism (Live Acoustic)

=== Download EP ===
1. Purple
2. Nothing But (Live Acoustic)
3. Just Let the Sun (Live Acoustic)
4. Purple (Live Acoustic)
5. Hedonism (Live Acoustic)

== Charts ==
Chart (2006)	Peak position
Italy (FIMI)	18
