= I Can Dream =

1995 single by Skunk Anansie

Single by Skunk Anansie

from the album Paranoid & Sunburnt
- B-side: "Aesthetic Anarchist"; "Black Skin Sexuality"; "Little Baby Swastikkka"
- Released: 5 June 1995
- Length: 3:39
- Label: One Little Indian
- Songwriters: Skin; Len Arran
- Producers: Sylvia Massy; Skunk Anansie

Skunk Anansie singles chronology
"Selling Jesus" (1995)	"I Can Dream" (1995)	"Charity" (1995)

"I Can Dream" is a song by British rock band Skunk Anansie, released as their second single in June 1995. The song was taken from their debut album, Paranoid & Sunburnt (1995), and reached number 41 on the UK singles chart. The CD single features two B-sides and a live recording of "Little Baby Swastikkka".

== Critical reception ==
Mark Sutherland from Smash Hits gave "I Can Dream" four out of five, writing, "Meet the scariest band on the planet. The Skunks play blood-and-guts indie-metal, their singer Skin makes Tank Girl look like Zoe Ball (now there's an idea!) and the moshpit at their gigs should carry a Government Health Warning. In other words, they are ace to the power of fantastic and this will be a hit, otherwise Ms Skin will be very cross indeed. And believe me, you DO NOT want that."

== Music video ==
The black-and-white music video for "I Can Dream" was directed by production team Gob TV, who also directed the video for "Selling Jesus".

== Track listings ==
- UK CD single
1. "I Can Dream" – 3:39
2. "Aesthetic Anarchist" – 2:56
3. "Black Skin Sexuality" – 5:52
4. "Little Baby Swastikkka" – 4:08
- UK 10-inch and cassette single
1. "I Can Dream" – 3:39
2. "Aesthetic Anarchist" – 2:56
3. "Black Skin Sexuality" – 5:52

== Charts ==
Chart (1995–1996)	Peak position
Australia (ARIA)	60
Scottish Singles Sales (Official Charts)	40
UK Singles (Official Charts)	41
