= Anarchytecture =

Studio album by Skunk Anansie
- Released: 15 January 2016
- Studio: RAK Studios (London)
- Length: 37:48
- Label: earMUSIC, Carosello
- Producer: Tom Dalgety

Skunk Anansie chronology
Black Traffic (2012)	Anarchytecture (2016)	25Live@25 (2019)

Anarchytecture is the sixth studio album by English band Skunk Anansie. It was produced by Tom Dalgety and released in January 2016 through earMUSIC and Carosello Records.

== Critical reception ==
Professional ratings
Aggregate scores
Source	Rating
Metacritic	65/100
Review scores
Source	Rating
Clash	6/10
Drowned in Sound	7/10
Gigwise	7/10 stars
Hackney Gazette	2/5
London Evening Standard	2/5 stars
Record Collector	3/5 stars
TeamRock	7/10

Anarchytecture received mixed professional reviews.

The Clash magazine wrote that while it sounded "more sincere" than the previous album Black Traffic the songwriting was still "timid", citing the lead single "Love Someone Else" as "one of the dullest songs" ever written by Skunk Anansie. The reviewer did, however, remark specific tracks like "Death To The Lovers" that was reminiscent of early songs like "Hedonism", and "Without You" as typical Skunk Anansie songs. Drowned in Sound wrote that the album skipped from genre to genre "in a fairly risk-free, but comfortably accomplished way". With Anarchytecture, Skunk Anansie knew how "to produce the best possible version of themselves". The reviewer for Gigwise criticised that after 20 years, Skunk Anansie's original sounds had been turned to "more conventional, melody-driven rock". Nonetheless, he praised singer Skin's honest lyrics and found that the album was enjoyable for old and new fans alike. The Record Collector magazine wrote that Anarchytecture continued the band's 1990s sound. Also the reviewer for the Sonic Seducer found references to Skunk Anansie's musical past in songs like "We Are The Flames" and "Suckers!". He wrote also that "In The Backroom" was reminiscent of Gossip while the opulent "Death To The Lovers" could as well have been performed by Annie Lennox.

Papers like the Hackney Gazette and the London Evening Standard were more critical. The former stated that the album was partly solid but also "forgettable" in other parts and that the band was struggling to match their early dynamic style. A review by the latter newspaper found that the album's "horrible portmanteau title [was] reflected in the record’s jarring combination of big guitars and lurking synths."

== Track listing ==
All songs written by Skunk Anansie, except "Love Someone Else" by Skin and Martin Buttrich.

No.	Title	Length
1.	"Love Someone Else"	3:31
2.	"Victim"	4:16
3.	"Beauty Is Your Curse"	3:41
4.	"Death to the Lovers"	4:08
5.	"In the Back Room"	3:39
6.	"Bullets"	3:53
7.	"That Sinking Feeling"	2:46
8.	"Without You"	3:35
9.	"Suckers!"	1:22
10.	"We Are the Flames"	3:26
11.	"I'll Let You Down"	3:30

== Personnel ==
Skunk Anansie

- Skin - vocals, backing vocals
- Martin "Ace" Kent - guitar
- Richard "Cass" Lewis - bass guitar, keyboards
- Mark Richardson - drums, percussion

with

- Pete Davis - keyboards, programming

== Charts ==
Charts	Peak position
Austrian Albums (Ö3 Austria)	48
Belgian Albums (Ultratop Flanders)	25
Belgian Albums (Ultratop Wallonia)	36
Dutch Albums (Album Top 100)	37
French Albums (SNEP)	105
German Albums (Offizielle Top 100)	52
Italian Albums (FIMI)	5
Polish Albums (ZPAV)	8
Scottish Albums (Official Charts)	91
Swiss Albums (Schweizer Hitparade)	11
UK Albums (Official Charts)	85
UK Album Downloads (Official Charts)	69
