= Wonderlustre =

Studio album by Skunk Anansie
- Released: 13 September 2010
- Recorded: 2010
- Studio: 21 Studio, London
- Genre: Alternative rock; post-grunge
- Length: 41:03
- Label: V2; earMUSIC; Carosello
- Producer: Skunk Anansie; Brio Taliaferro; Jeremy Wheatley

Skunk Anansie chronology
Smashes and Trashes (2009)	Wonderlustre (2010)	Black Traffic (2012)

Singles from Wonderlustre
- 1. "My Ugly Boy" Released: 15 August 2010; 2. "Talk Too Much" / "Over the Love" Released: 8 November 2010; 3. "You Saved Me" Released: 24 January 2011

Professional ratings
Review scores
Source	Rating
AllMusic	4/5 stars
BBC	(favourable)
Kerrang!	4/5 stars
MetalSucks	4/5 stars
PopMatters	7/10

Wonderlustre is the fourth studio album by the British rock band Skunk Anansie. It was the band's first full studio album since Post Orgasmic Chill in 1999. It was released on 13 September 2010 in Europe on V2 Records, earMUSIC and Carosello Records and was preceded by the single "My Ugly Boy", which was released on 16 August 2010. The album is available digitally, as a single CD, a 2 CD tour edition set, a CD/DVD digipack and as a 12" double LP.

In 2012 it was awarded a silver certification from the Independent Music Companies Association, which indicated sales of at least 20,000 copies throughout Europe.

== Track listing ==
All tracks written by Skunk Anansie; except where indicated

No.	Title	Writer(s)	Length
1.	"God Loves Only You"		3:48
2.	"My Ugly Boy"		3:27
3.	"Over the Love"		3:27
4.	"Talk Too Much"	Skin, Elliot King	3:20
5.	"The Sweetest Thing"		3:38
6.	"It Doesn't Matter"		2:46
7.	"You're Too Expensive for Me"	Skin, Elliot King, Wayne Riches	2:29
8.	"My Love Will Fall"		3:56
9.	"You Saved Me"		3:38
10.	"Feeling the Itch"		3:06
11.	"You Can't Always Do What You Like"		3:31
12.	"I Will Stay But You Should Leave"		3:58
13.	"Would You?" (Digital Bonus Track)		2:58
14.	"Over The Love (Shoreditch Version)" (Tour Edition Only)		3:26
15.	"You Saved Me (Shoreditch Version)" (Tour Edition Only)		3:20
16.	"Tracy's Flaw (Shoreditch Version)" (Tour Edition Only)		3:25
17.	"I Will Stay But You Should Leave (Shoreditch Version)" (Tour Edition Only)		3:50
18.	"God Loves Only You (Shoreditch Version)" (Tour Edition Only)		4:04
19.	"Because Of You (Acoustic Version live at 3FM, Holland)" (Tour Edition Only)		3:37

== DVD ==
No.	Title	Length
1.	"The Making of Wonderlustre"	10:09
2.	"Skunk Anansie on the Road – Festivals 2010"	11:47
3.	"My Ugly Boy – Video"	3:27
4.	"The Making of My Ugly Boy"	8:39

== Personnel ==
Skunk Anansie

- Skin – vocals, backing vocals; guitar on "God Loves Only You"; piano on "My Love Will Fall" and "I Will Stay But You Should Leave"
- Martin "Ace" Kent – guitar
- Richard "Cass" Lewis – bass guitar
- Mark Richardson – drums, percussion

with:

- Toby Baker – Hammond organ on "God Loves Only You", "Over the Love" and "I Will Stay But You Should Leave"
- James McMillan – piano on "You Saved Me"
- Brio Taliaferro – programming; keyboards on "You Saved Me"
- Neil Comber – additional programming
- Brio Taliaferro, Oliver Kraus and Skin – string arrangement on "Talk Too Much"
- Oliver Kraus – strings on "Talk Too Much"

Technical

- Chris Sheldon – engineer
- Cenzo Townshend, Jeremy Wheatley – mixing
- Shotopop – cover illustration, art direction
- Jeon Seung Hwan – photographt

== Charts ==
Chart (2010)	Peak position
Austrian Albums Chart	33
Belgian Albums Chart (Flanders)	19
Belgian Albums Chart (Wallonia)	47
Dutch Albums Chart	12
European Albums Chart	20
French Albums Chart	67
Italian Albums Chart	1
Polish Albums Chart	9
Scottish Albums	74
Swiss Albums Chart	11
UK Albums Chart	58
UK Album Downloads Chart	66
UK Independent Albums	8

== Certifications ==
Region	Certification	Certified units/sales
Italy (FIMI)	Gold	30,000^{*}
Poland (ZPAV)	Gold	10,000^{*}
Portugal (AFP)	Gold	10,000^{^}
^{*} Sales figures based on certification alone.^{^} Shipments figures based on certification alone.
