= Black Traffic =

Studio album by Skunk Anansie
- Released: 17 September 2012
- Genre: Alternative rock, hard rock
- Length: 37:50
- Label: 100% Records; earMUSIC; Carosello
- Producer: Chris Sheldon, Skunk Anansie

Skunk Anansie chronology
| Wonderlustre (2010) | Black Traffic (2012) | Anarchytecture (2016) |

Black Traffic is a fifth studio album by English alternative rock band Skunk Anansie. It was released on 17 September 2012 through 100% Records, earMUSIC and Carosello Records. The first single from the album is "I Believed in You" which is about people being disappointed in their politicians.

In 2012 it was awarded a silver certification from the Independent Music Companies Association, which indicated sales of at least 20,000 copies throughout Europe.

== Critical reception ==
Professional ratings
Aggregate scores
| Source | Rating |
|---|---|
| Metacritic | 55/100 |
Review scores
| Source | Rating |
| AllMusic | 3.5/5 stars |
| Louder Sound | 3.5/5 stars |
| MusicOMH | 2/5 stars |
| MusicOMH | 2/5 stars |
| NME | 0.5/5 stars |
| PopMatters | 4/10 |

Black Traffic was met with "mixed or average" reviews from critics. At Metacritic, which assigns a weighted average rating out of 100 to reviews from mainstream publications, this release received an average score of 55, based on 6 reviews.

== Track listing ==
All tracks written by Skunk Anansie.

| No. | Title | Length |
|---|---|---|
| 1. | "I Will Break You" | 3:12 |
| 2. | "Sad Sad Sad" | 2:57 |
| 3. | "Spit You Out" (featuring Shaka Ponk) | 3:30 |
| 4. | "I Hope You Get to Meet Your Hero" | 3:44 |
| 5. | "I Believed in You" | 3:12 |
| 6. | "Satisfied?" | 3:22 |
| 7. | "Our Summer Kills the Sun" | 4:14 |
| 8. | "Drowning" | 4:11 |
| 9. | "This Is Not a Game" | 3:21 |
| 10. | "Sticky Fingers in Your Honey" | 2:33 |
| 11. | "Diving Down" | 3:48 |

== Personnel ==
Skunk Anansie

- Skin - vocals; keyboards on "Spit You Out" and "This is Not a Game"
- Martin "Ace" Kent - guitar
- Richard "Cass" Lewis - bass; keyboards on "Spit You Out", "This is Not a Game" and "Drowning"
- Mark Richardson - drums

with:

- François "Frah" Charon, Samaha Achoun - additional voices and guitar on "Spit You Out"
- Erika Footman - backing vocals on "Our Summer Kills the Sun"
- Anthony Leung - keyboards, programming
- Isaac Aryee - keyboards on "Drowning"
- Wil Malone - string arrangements and conductor on "I Hope You Get to Meet Your Hero" and "Drowning"

== Charts ==
Chart performance for Black Traffic
| Chart (2012) | Peak position |
|---|---|
| Austrian Albums (Ö3 Austria) | 28 |
| Belgian Albums (Ultratop Flanders) | 30 |
| Belgian Albums (Ultratop Wallonia) | 55 |
| Dutch Albums (Album Top 100) | 32 |
| French Albums (SNEP) | 72 |
| German Albums (Offizielle Top 100) | 33 |
| Italian Albums (FIMI) | 2 |
| Scottish Albums (Official Charts) | 42 |
| Swiss Albums (Schweizer Hitparade) | 7 |
| UK Albums (Official Charts) | 42 |
| UK Album Downloads (Official Charts) | 67 |
| UK Independent Albums (Official Charts) | 9 |
