= Charlie Big Potato =

1999 single by Skunk Anansie

Single by Skunk Anansie

from the album Post Orgasmic Chill
- B-side: "Feel"; "80s Mellow Drone"; "Sane"; "Jack Knife Ginal"
- Released: 1 March 1999
- Length: 4:45
- Label: Virgin
- Songwriters: Skin; Len Arran
- Producers: Skunk Anansie; Clif Norrell

Skunk Anansie singles chronology
"Brazen (Weep)" (1997)	"Charlie Big Potato" (1999)	"Secretly" (1999)

"Charlie Big Potato" is the first single released from British rock band Skunk Anansie's third studio album, Post Orgasmic Chill (1999). The single came after the band switched record labels, moving from the independent label One Little Indian to Virgin Records. The song was released on 1 March 1999, reaching number 17 on the UK singles chart and number three in Iceland.

CD 1 of the single contains an interactive element featuring the video, and CD 2 includes three specially produced polaroid photographs of the band. The song was a favourite at festivals and Skin often performs a slower version of the song at her solo gigs.

== Music video ==
The single's music video, directed by Giuseppe Capotondi and storyboarded by Concept Developer Andrew Trovaioli, shows the band appearing in different locations, with Skin waking up in a toilet, followed by a boy beginning to realise that his nightmares have become real.

== Track listings ==
CD single – CD1

No.	Title	Length
1.	"Charlie Big Potato"	4:45
2.	"Feel"	5:28
3.	"80s Mellow Drone"	3:50
4.	"Interactive Section"	N/A
Total length:		14:03

CD single – CD2

No.	Title	Length
1.	"Charlie Big Potato"	4:45
2.	"Sane"	5:11
3.	"Jack Knife Ginal"	4:17
Total length:		14:13

== Charts ==
Weekly chart performance for "Charlie Big Potato"
Chart (1999)	Peak position
Australia (ARIA)	72
Belgium (Ultratip Bubbling Under Flanders)	11
Europe (Eurochart Hot 100)	68
Iceland (Íslenski Listinn Topp 40)	3
Germany (GfK)	96
Netherlands (Single Top 100)	59
Scottish Singles Sales (Official Charts)	18
UK Singles (Official Charts)	17
UK Rock & Metal (Official Charts)	1
