= Secretly (Skunk Anansie song) =

1999 single by Skunk Anansie

Single by Skunk Anansie

from the album Post Orgasmic Chill
- B-side: "King Psychotic Size"; "Painkillers"; "Breathing"
- Released: 10 May 1999
- Length: 4:46
- Label: Virgin
- Songwriters: Skin; Len Arran
- Producers: Skunk Anansie; Clif Norrell

Skunk Anansie singles chronology
"Charlie Big Potato" (1999)	"Secretly" (1999)	"Lately" (1999)

"Secretly" is a song by British rock band Skunk Anansie, released as the second single from their third studio album, Post Orgasmic Chill (1999), on 10 May 1999. The song charted at number 16 on the UK Singles Chart, number eight in Italy, and number two in Iceland. CD1 includes an interactive element featuring the video. The song was played during the closing credits to the film Cruel Intentions and is included on the film's soundtrack album. The video for the single drew heavily on the film.

== Music video ==
The music video was directed by Giuseppe Capotondi.

== Track listing ==
CD single – CD1

No.	Title	Length
1.	"Secretly"	4:46
2.	"King Psychotic Size"	4:28
3.	"Painkillers"	2:32
4.	"Interactive Section"	N/A
Total length:		11:46

CD single – CD2

No.	Title	Length
1.	"Secretly"	4:46
2.	"Secretly (Optical Vocal Mix)"	8:10
3.	"Breathing"	2:53
Total length:		15:49

== Charts ==
=== Weekly charts ===
Weekly chart performance for "Secretly"
Chart (1999)	Peak position
Belgium (Ultratip Bubbling Under Flanders)	14
Iceland (Íslenski Listinn Topp 40)	2
Italy (Musica e dischi)	8
Italy Airplay (Music & Media)	2
Netherlands (Dutch Top 40)	28
Netherlands (Single Top 100)	30
Scottish Singles Sales (Official Charts)	15
UK Singles (Official Charts)	16

=== Year-end charts ===
Year-end chart performance for "Secretly"
Chart (1999)	Position
Netherlands (Dutch Top 40)	185
