= All I Want (Skunk Anansie song) =

Single by Skunk Anansie

from the album Stoosh
- B-side: "Fragile"; "Punk by Numbers" (1996 Mix); "Your Fight"; "But the Sex Was Good"; "Every Bitch but Me"; "Black Skinhead Coconut Dogfight"
- Released: 16 September 1996
- Genre: Punk rock
- Length: 3:50
- Label: One Little Indian (UK)
- Songwriters: Skin, Cass, Ace
- Producer: GGGarth. Skunk Anansie

Skunk Anansie singles chronology
"Weak" (1996)	"All I Want" (1996)	"Twisted (Everyday Hurts)" (1996)

"All I Want" is a song by Skunk Anansie, released as the first single from their second album, Stoosh. It was released in September 1996 and reached number 14 on the UK Singles Chart.

== Music video ==
The music video was directed by Stephen Norrington.

== Track listing ==
=== CD single – CD1 ===
No.	Title	Length
1.	"All I Want"	3:50
2.	"Fragile"	3:18
3.	"Punk By Numbers"	3:01
4.	"Your Fight"	1:58
Total length:		12:07

=== CD single – CD2 ===
No.	Title	Length
1.	"All I Want (DVS Mix)"	3:50
2.	"But the Sex Was Good"	4:32
3.	"Every Bitch but Me"	4:08
4.	"Black Skinhead Coconut Dogfight"	6:37
Total length:		19:07

== Charts ==
Chart performance for "All I Want"
Chart (1996)	Peak position
Australia (ARIA)	80
Sweden (Sverigetopplistan)	58
UK Singles (Official Charts)	14
