= Charity (song) =

1995 single by Skunk Anansie

Single by Skunk Anansie

from the album Paranoid & Sunburnt
- B-side: "Used"; "Killer's War"; "Kept My Mouth Shut"
- Released: 21 August 1995
- Length: 4:36
- Label: One Little Indian
- Songwriters: Skin; Len Arran
- Producers: Sylvia Massy; Skunk Anansie

Skunk Anansie singles chronology
"I Can Dream" (1995)	"Charity" (1995)	"Weak" (1996)

Alternative cover
- Re-release artwork (CD1)

Alternative cover
- Re-release artwork (CD2)

"Charity" is a song by British rock band Skunk Anansie, released as their third single on 21 August 1995 by One Little Indian and re-released on 15 April 1996. The original release reached number 40 on the UK singles chart while the re-release reached number 20. In Iceland, the song became the band's first of three number-one singles. When re-released, two new CDs were made available. CD1 contains live versions of "I Can Dream" and "Punk by Numbers", and CD2 includes live versions of tracks from Paranoid & Sunburnt.

== Critical reception ==
Roy Wilkinson from Select wrote, "On this front, 'Charity' is their trump card, welding the stridently soul momma-ish chorus to a soulfully country-tinged verse that wouldn't have been that out of place on the last Scream album."

== Music video ==
The music video for "Charity" was directed by David Mould. Stills of the video were used as covers for the single.

== Track listings ==
- Original release CD single

No.	Title	Length
1.	"Charity"	4:36
2.	"Used"	4:54
3.	"Killers' War"	4:00
4.	"Kept My Mouth Shut"	3:38
Total length:		17:08

- Re-release CD single: CD1

No.	Title	Length
1.	"Charity"	4:36
2.	"I Can Dream (Live)"	3:36
3.	"Killers' War"	2:48
Total length:		11:00

- Re-release CD single: CD2

No.	Title	Length
1.	"Charity (Live)"	4:53
2.	"Here I Stand (Live)"	5:33
3.	"It Takes Blood and Guts (Live)"	4:28
4.	"Intellectualise My Blackness (Live)"	4:21
Total length:		19:15

- 10-inch vinyl

No.	Title	Length
1.	"Charity"	4:36
2.	"Used"	4:54
3.	"Killer's War"	4:00
Total length:		13:30

== Charts ==
=== Weekly charts ===
Chart (1995)	Peak position
Scottish Singles Sales (Official Charts)	35
UK Singles (Official Charts)	40

Chart (1996)	Peak position
Iceland (Íslenski Listinn Topp 40)	1
Netherlands (Dutch Top 40 Tipparade)	18
Netherlands (Single Top 100 Tipparade)	3
Scottish Singles Sales (Official Charts)	19
UK Singles (Official Charts)	20

=== Year-end charts ===
Chart (1996)	Position
Iceland (Íslenski Listinn Topp 40)	19
