= Fake Chemical State =

Studio album by Skin
- Released: 20 March 2006
- Recorded: 2005
- Studios: The Silver Transporterraum of London; The Garden, London; Kung Fu Gardens, Burbank, California; Mercy Sound, New York
- Genre: Alternative rock
- Length: 35:59
- Label: V2
- Producers: Skin, Gordon Raphael, Paul Draper

Skin chronology
Fleshwounds (2003)	Fake Chemical State (2006)

Singles from Fake Chemical State
- 1. "Alone in My Room" Released: 14 November 2005; 2. "Just Let the Sun" Released: 6 March 2006; 3. "Purple" Released: 2006; 4. "Nothing But" Released: 2006

Fake Chemical State is the second solo album by Skunk Anansie lead vocalist Skin. Released on 20 March 2006, the album was produced by Gordon Raphael and Skin herself, except for the first single "Alone in My Room", which Skin produced with former Mansun lead vocalist Paul Draper. The track "Take Me On" features Italian music group Marlene Kuntz with whom Skin previously collaborated on the track "La canzone che scrivo per te" for their album Che cosa vedi.

The album was re-released in Italy on 17 November 2006. This release contained new artwork and a bonus DVD with the 4 singles' music videos and a 30-minute Electronic Press Kit.

== Track listing ==
All songs were written by Skin and Paul Draper, except where noted.

1. "Alone in My Room" – 2:38
2. "She's On" – 3:16
3. "Movin'" (Skin) – 3:58
4. "Just Let the Sun" – 3:46
5. "Purple" (Gary Clark, Skin) – 3:42
6. "Don't Need a Reason" (John Blackburn, Ben Christophers, Elliot King, Wayne Riches, Skin) – 3:47
7. "Nothing But" (Skin) – 3:50
8. "Take Me On" – 4:06
9. "Fooling Yourself" (Len Arran, Skin) – 3:09
10. "Falling for You" (Arran, Skin) – 3:41

=== Bonus tracks ===
iTunes Store

11. "I Can Dream" (live) – 2:58

Japanese edition

11. "Cheating on Myself" – 3:47

== Personnel ==
- Skin – vocals, guitar (track 8), production
- Luca Bergia – drums (track 8)
- John Blackburn – bass guitar (tracks 2 to 6 and 8 to 10)
- Ben Christophers – guitar (tracks 3, 6, 9 and 10)
- Paul Draper – production, guitar, bass (track 1)
- Joshua Freese – drums (track 7)
- Cristiano Godano – guitar (track 8)
- Elliot King – guitar (tracks 2 to 7 and 9 to 10)
- Mark Kulke – guitar
- Linda Perry – bass, Mellotron (track 7)
- Gordon Raphael – production (tracks 2 to 10), Hammond organ, synthesizer (track 4)
- Mark Richardson – drums (tracks 9 and 10)
- Wayne Riches – drums
- Riccardo Tesio – guitar (track 8)

Technical

- Alan Moulder – mixing
- Derrick Santini – photography

== Charts ==
Chart (2006)	Peak position
Austrian Albums (Ö3 Austria)	44
Belgian Albums (Ultratop Flanders)	60
Belgian Albums (Ultratop Wallonia)	75
Dutch Albums (Album Top 100)	43
French Albums (SNEP)	153
German Albums (Offizielle Top 100)	67
Italian Albums (FIMI)	21
Swiss Albums (Schweizer Hitparade)	8
UK Albums (Official Charts)	176
UK Independent Albums (Official Charts)	18
