= Twisted (Everyday Hurts) =

1996 single by Skunk Anansie

Single by Skunk Anansie

from the album Stoosh
- B-side: "She's My Heroine"; "Milk Is My Sugar"; "Pickin on Me"; "Yes It's Fucking Political"
- Released: 18 November 1996
- Length: 4:14
- Label: One Little Indian
- Songwriters: Skin; Cass; Ace
- Producers: GGGarth; Skunk Anansie

Skunk Anansie singles chronology
"All I Want" (1996)	"Twisted (Everyday Hurts)" (1996)	"Hedonism (Just Because You Feel Good)" (1997)

"Twisted (Everyday Hurts)" is a song by British rock band Skunk Anansie, released as their second single from their second album, Stoosh (1996). It was released in November 1996, reaching number 26 on the UK Singles Chart and number three in Iceland.

== Music video ==
The music video was directed by Anton Beebe. It begins the band walking through a desert while chained and ends with Skin pressing the button, only to reveal that the "desert" was in fact a dream with the band still asleep in a black room. It was inspired by the film Total Recall.

== Track listing ==
CD single – CD1

No.	Title	Length
1.	"Twisted (Everyday Hurts)"	4:14
2.	"She's My Heroine (Polyester & Cotton Mix)"	4:03
3.	"Milk Is My Sugar (Cement Mix)"	4:44
4.	"Pickin on Me (Instrumental Picknmix)"	4:15
Total length:		17:16

CD single – CD2

No.	Title	Length
1.	"Twisted (Everyday Hurts) (Cake Mix)"	5:52
2.	"Pickin on Me (Pick'n'Mix)"	4:18
3.	"Yes It's Fucking Political (Comix)"	3:31
4.	"Milk Is My Sugar (Instrumental Cement Mix)"	4:42
Total length:		18:23

== Charts ==
=== Weekly charts ===
Weekly chart performance for "Twisted (Everyday Hurts)"
Chart (1996–1997)	Peak position
Australia (ARIA)	82
Iceland (Íslenski Listinn Topp 40)	3
Netherlands (Single Top 100)	100
Scottish Singles Sales (Official Charts)	32
UK Singles (Official Charts)	26
UK Indie (Music Week)	1

=== Year-end charts ===
Year-end chart performance for "Twisted (Everyday Hurts)"
Chart (1997)	Position
Iceland (Íslenski Listinn Topp 40)	56
