= Just Let the Sun =

Single by Skin
- Released: 6 March 2006
- Label: V2
- Songwriter(s): Skin, Paul Draper
- Producer(s): Gordon Raphael, Skin

Skin singles chronology
| "Alone in My Room" (2006) | "Just Let the Sun" (2006) | "Purple" (2006) |

"Just Let the Sun" is the second released from Skin's second album Fake Chemical State. Like her previous single, "Alone in My Room", the song was co-written with Paul Draper from Mansun. This was the first single from the album to be available on CD single. The release featured two B-Sides, "Only Vultures" and "Petrol Station Flowers". "Only Vultures" is often used as the opening number to many of Skin's gigs.

== Track listing ==
=== CD single ===
1. Just Let The Sun
2. Only Vultures
3. Petrol Station Flowers

== Chart positions ==
| Chart (2006) | Position |
|---|---|
| Italy (FIMI) | 9 |
| Netherlands (Dutch Top 40) | 38 |
| Netherlands (Single Top 100) | 51 |
| Switzerland (Schweizer Hitparade) | 88 |
| UK Indie (OCC) | 27 |
