= Weak (Skunk Anansie song) =

1996 single by Skunk Anansie

Single by Skunk Anansie

from the album Paranoid & Sunburnt
- B-side: "Tour Hymn"; "100 Ways to Be a Good Girl" (remix); "Rise Up" (remix)
- Released: 15 January 1996
- Length: 3:33
- Label: One Little Indian
- Songwriters: Skin; Cass Lewis; Martin Kent; Robbie France
- Producers: Sylvia Massy; Skunk Anansie

Skunk Anansie singles chronology
"Charity" (1995)	"Weak" (1996)	"All I Want" (1996)

"Weak" is a song by British rock band Skunk Anansie, released on 15 January 1996, by One Little Indian, as the fourth and final single from their debut album, Paranoid & Sunburnt (1995). It reached number two in Iceland and became a top-20 hit in Sweden and on the UK Singles Chart. At many of her solo gigs, lead singer Skin performs a slower, more ballad-like version.

== Composition ==
Skin wrote the core of the song based on a past abusive relationship experience. The band helped build this out.

== Recording ==
The song was produced by the band with Sylvia Massy. The band 'made a kind of “battle zone” in the studio for Skin, with all these banners and placards all over the place. She’d put on war paint.'

== Critical reception ==
Roy Wilkinson from Select wrote, "'Weak' could be their 'Under the Bridge', an understated, casually memorable verse leading into a chorus thas has as much to do with Heart as Metallica."

== Music video ==
The music video for "Weak" was directed by duo Hammer & Tongs. It is filmed primarily (with cutaways to third party views) from the point of view of a collapsed cameraman in what appears to be a restaurant carpark (Route 66). The cameraman collapses behind a car which then drives off to show Skin and the band forming to perform for the offset camera. The recording is interrupted by a little boy who, after being pulled out of the way of the camera abruptly, decides to run off with it and the band gives chase after him.

== Track listings ==
- CD single – CD1

No.	Title	Length
1.	"Weak"	3:33
2.	"Selling Jesus"	3:44
3.	"Tour Hymn"	3:18
Total length:		10:35

- CD single – CD2

No.	Title	Length
1.	"Weak" (Ackee and Saltfish mix)	3:56
2.	"Charity" (Clit Pop mix)	4:34
3.	"100 Ways to Be a Good Girl" (Anti Matter mix)	4:32
4.	"Rise Up" (Bonhamoon mix)	5:00
Total length:		18:02

== Charts ==
=== Weekly charts ===
Chart (1996)	Peak position
Australia (ARIA)	105
Europe (Eurochart Hot 100)	36
Iceland (Íslenski Listinn Topp 40)	2
Israel (Israeli Singles Chart)	15
Netherlands (Dutch Top 40)	35
Netherlands (Single Top 100)	31
Scottish Singles Sales (Official Charts)	21
Sweden (Sverigetopplistan)	12
UK Singles (Official Charts)	20

=== Year-end charts ===
Chart (1996)	Position
Iceland (Íslenski Listinn Topp 40)	45
Sweden (Topplistan)	64

== Certifications ==
Region	Certification	Certified units/sales
United Kingdom (BPI)	Silver	200,000^{‡}
^{‡} Sales+streaming figures based on certification alone.
