= Fleshwounds =

Studio album by Skin
- Released: 9 September 2003
- Recorded: 2002–2003
- Genre: Indie rock, alternative rock
- Length: 43:56
- Label: EMI
- Producer: Skin, David Kosten, Marius de Vries, FLO, Guy Chambers, Richard Flack, Adrian Bushby

Skin chronology
Post Orgasmic Chill (1999)	Fleshwounds (2003)	Fake Chemical State (2006)

Alternative cover
- Original cover

Professional ratings
Review scores
Source	Rating
AllMusic	4/5 stars

Fleshwounds is the debut solo album from Skunk Anansie lead singer Skin. Not entirely satisfied with its initial release, Skin re-released it with new album artwork and a slightly different track listing. "As Long as That's True" was replaced with "Getting Away with It", a cover of the song by Electronic. The radio edit to "Faithfulness" was also added.

Three singles were released from this album; "Trashed", "Faithfulness" and the double A-side, "Lost" / "Getting Away with It".

== Track listing ==
All tracks composed by Skin and Len Arran; except where indicated.

=== Original release ===
1. "Faithfulness"
2. "Trashed"
3. "Don't Let Me Down"
4. "Listen to Yourself"
5. "Lost" (Skin, Guy Chambers)
6. "The Trouble with Me"
7. "I'll Try" (Skin, Craig Ross)
8. "You've Made Your Bed"
9. "As Long as That's True"
10. "Burnt Like You"
11. "'Til Morning"

=== Re-release ===
1. "Faithfulness"
2. "Trashed"
3. "Don't Let Me Down"
4. "Listen to Yourself"
5. "Lost"
6. "The Trouble with Me"
7. "Getting Away with It" (Electronic cover)
8. "You've Made Your Bed"
9. "I'll Try"
10. "Burnt Like You"
11. "'Til Morning"
12. "Faithfulness" (Radio Mix)

== Personnel ==
- Skin – lead vocals, backing vocals
- Ben Christophers – electric guitar, Wurlitzer organ, piano
- Craig Ross – electric and acoustic guitar, Hammond organ
- Milton McDonald – acoustic and electric guitar
- Jacob Golden – acoustic and electric guitar, piano
- Len Arran – acoustic guitar
- Gail Ann Dorsey – electric bass, tambourine
- Danny Thompson – double bass, acoustic bass
- Richard "Cass" Lewis, Phil Spalding – electric bass
- Phil Palmer – guitar
- David Kosten – Wurlitzer organ, glockenspiel, vibraphone, Hammond organ, piano
- Marius de Vries – keyboards, programming
- Guy Chambers – keyboards, piano
- Fay Lovsky – theremin
- Gavin Bowes, Ian Thomas, Richard Jupp, Darrin Mooney, Gary O'Toole – drums
- Mark Feltham – harmonica
- Augusta Harris – cello
- Drucilla Harris – violin
- Livia Harris – recorder
- Mike Figgis, Terry Edwards – trumpet
- Mike Kearsey – trombone

== Singles ==
Three singles were released from Fleshwounds.

=== Trashed ===
1. "Trashed" (Skin & Len Arran)
2. "On & On" (Skin & Len Arran)
3. "Interview"

=== Faithfulness ===
1. "Faithfulness" (Radio Mix) (Skin & Len Arran)
2. "Faithfulness" (Scumfrog Mix) (Skin & Len Arran)

=== Lost/Getting Away with It ===
A video was shot and released before the single was withdrawn.

1. "Lost"
2. "Getting Away with It"

== Charts ==
=== Weekly charts ===
Chart (2003)	Peak position
Austrian Albums (Ö3 Austria)	42
Belgian Albums (Ultratop Flanders)	40
Belgian Albums (Ultratop Wallonia)	50
Dutch Albums (Album Top 100)	56
French Albums (SNEP)	147
German Albums (Offizielle Top 100)	18
Italian Albums (FIMI)	6
Portuguese Albums (AFP)	23
Swiss Albums (Schweizer Hitparade)	13
UK Albums (OCC)	43

=== Year-end charts ===
Chart (2003)	Position
Swiss Albums (Schweizer Hitparade)	68
