= Hedonism (Just Because You Feel Good) =

1997 single by Skunk Anansie

Single by Skunk Anansie

from the album Stoosh
- B-side: "So Sublime"; "Let It Go"; "Strong"; "Song Recovery"; "Contraband"; "I Don't Believe"
- Released: 13 January 1997
- Genre: Rock
- Length: 3:27
- Label: One Little Indian
- Songwriters: Skin; Len Arran
- Producer: GGGarth

Skunk Anansie singles chronology
"Twisted (Everyday Hurts)" (1996)	"Hedonism (Just Because You Feel Good)" (1997)	"Brazen (Weep)" (1997)

Music video
- "Hedonism (Just Because You Feel Good)" on YouTube

"Hedonism (Just Because You Feel Good)" is a song by British rock group Skunk Anansie, released in January 1997 by One Little Indian as a single from their second album, Stoosh (1996). The song was written by Skin and Len Arran, and produced by GGGarth. It reached number 13 on the UK singles chart and was certified silver by the British Phonographic Industry (BPI) in February 2019 for sales and streams exceeding 200,000. It also entered the top 10 in the Netherlands, Norway, and Switzerland. In Iceland, the song peaked at number one. It is regarded as one of Skunk Anansie's most known singles and was a popular choice at concerts. Skin performs a version of the song at many of her solo gigs.

== Critical reception ==
Tania Branigan from Melody Maker felt the song "could be Sheryl Crow or Joan Osbourne; expect heavy rotation on MTV." David Sinclair from The Times wrote, "Wild-woman singer Skin shows her gentler side, at last, on this rock ballad. The most obvious hit yet from their album Stoosh."

== Music video ==
The accompanying music video for "Hedonism (Just Because You Feel Good)" was directed by Thomas Krygier, who also directed "Brazen (Weep)". It shows the band performing in a flat, followed by cutaway scenes that shows various people's instincts in the same flat. The video contained computer-generated imagery to manipulate some of the people's faces in the flat to show their emotions. The video also caused minor controversy when scenes contained two women tongue kiss.

== Track listings ==
- UK CD1 and Australian CD single
1. "Hedonism (Just Because You Feel Good)"
2. "So Sublime"
3. "Let It Go"
4. "Strong"
- UK CD2
1. "Hedonism (Just Because You Feel Good)" (allegedly acoustic mix)
2. "Song Recovery"
3. "Contraband"
4. "I Don't Believe"
- UK cassette single
1. "Hedonism (Just Because You Feel Good)"
2. "So Sublime"
- French CD single
1. "Hedonism (Just Because You Feel Good)"
2. "Hedonism (Just Because You Feel Good)" (allegedly acoustic mix)

== Charts ==
=== Weekly charts ===
Chart (1997)	Peak position
Austria (Ö3 Austria Top 40)	11
Europe (Eurochart Hot 100)	13
Europe Airplay (European Radio Top 50)	27
France (SNEP)	20
Germany (GfK)	12
Iceland (Íslenski Listinn Topp 40)	1
Israel (Israeli Singles Chart)	27
Italy Airplay (Music & Media)	5
Netherlands (Dutch Top 40)	6
Netherlands (Single Top 100)	6
Norway (VG-lista)	8
Scottish Singles Sales (Official Charts)	18
Sweden (Sverigetopplistan)	18
Switzerland (Schweizer Hitparade)	2
UK Singles (Official Charts)	13
UK Indie (Music Week)	1

=== Year-end charts ===
Chart (1997)	Position
Europe (Eurochart Hot 100)	54
Germany (Media Control)	55
Iceland (Íslenski Listinn Topp 40)	9
Netherlands (Dutch Top 40)	32
Netherlands (Single Top 100)	62
Romania (Romanian Top 100)	87
Switzerland (Schweizer Hitparade)	15
UK Singles (OCC)	163

== Certifications ==
Region	Certification	Certified units/sales
United Kingdom (BPI)	Silver	200,000^{‡}
^{‡} Sales+streaming figures based on certification alone.
