= Stoosh =

1996 studio album by Skunk Anansie

Studio album by Skunk Anansie
- Released: 7 October 1996
- Recorded: 1996
- Studio: Great Linford Manor (Milton Keynes, England)
- Genre: Hard rock; alternative rock
- Length: 47:33
- Label: One Little Indian, Epic
- Producer: GGGarth

Skunk Anansie chronology
Paranoid & Sunburnt (1995)	Stoosh (1996)	Post Orgasmic Chill (1999)

Singles from Stoosh
- 1. "All I Want" Released: 16 September 1996; 2. "Twisted (Everyday Hurts)" Released: 18 November 1996; 3. "Hedonism (Just Because You Feel Good)" Released: 13 January 1997; 4. "Brazen (Weep)" Released: 2 June 1997

Stoosh is the second studio album by British rock band Skunk Anansie, released on 7 October 1996.

== Critical reception ==
Professional ratings
Review scores
Source	Rating
AllMusic	4/5 stars
Entertainment Weekly	B
Music Week	4/5 stars
Robert Christgau	(neither)
Rock Hard	9.5/10
Sputnik Music	3/5

In July 1997, CMJ New Music described their sound on this album as "sludgy retro metal", and compared them to Faith No More and New Model Army. AllMusic's Tom Demalon retrospectively stated: "Skunk Anansie's full-frontal charge can be wearing at times, but for a good dose of aggressive, hard rock with better-than-average lyrics, Stoosh succeeds more than it fails." Tom Sinclair of Entertainment Weekly wrote that the record "finds Skunk Anansie trading their debut's polite Pat Benatar-ish rock for a bigger, more confrontational sound that flirts with metallic overkill even as it embraces folk and pop", adding that "they've toughened up with Stoosh."

In 2005, Stoosh was ranked number 367 in Rock Hard magazine's book The 500 Greatest Rock & Metal Albums of All Time. In 2020, PopMatters's Enio Chiola featured the record on its list for "15 Overlooked and Underrated Albums of the 1990s."

== Track listing ==
No.	Title	Writer(s)	Length
1.	"Yes It's Fucking Political"	Skin, Cass, Ace	3:51
2.	"All I Want"	Skin, Cass, Ace	3:52
3.	"She's My Heroine"	Skin, Len Arran	5:03
4.	"Infidelity (Only You)"	Skin, Cass, Ace	6:00
5.	"Hedonism (Just Because You Feel Good)"	Skin, Len Arran	3:29
6.	"Twisted (Everyday Hurts)"	Skin, Len Arran	4:13
7.	"We Love Your Apathy"	Skin, Cass, Ace	5:11
8.	"Brazen (Weep)"	Skin, Len Arran	4:38
9.	"Pickin On Me"	Skin, Len Arran	3:18
10.	"Milk Is My Sugar"	Skin, Cass, Ace	3:48
11.	"Glorious Pop Song"	Skin, Cass, Ace	4:18

Skin gave a track-by-track guide to Select:

1. Yes It's Fucking Political "The main criticism we have had is that you can't mix politics and music, which seems like quite a fascist idea from music journalists. This song is about how everything is fucking political, and we'll always have that element to our music."
2. All I Want "We wrote this song in America. We just kept bumping into these people whose only religion was money. It's a song about greed. It's not typical of Americans – just people who like hanging around bands."
3. She's My Heroine "There's quite a few melancholic songs on this album, like this one. This is a song about how some things that you think are really good for you can also really fuck you up. I discovered this with someone I used to go out with."
4. Infidelity (Only You) "The title is what it is about. We have a string quartet on a few songs on this album, which was arranged by Michael McKeegan, who works with Therapy?. He also plays cello and he's fantastic."
5. Hedonism (Just Because It Feels Good) "This is one of my favourite lyrics on the album, just because it is so simple but says so much. As a band, you are forced into so many situations where you are pushed to just have a good time all the time, and you sometimes have to take a step back and see what success is doing to you."
6. Twisted (Everyday Hurts) "I'm really not sure what this song is about! I wrote it while I was in a bad situation and, now I'm out of it, the song means something different. The lyrics are quite depressive, which goes against the whole happy groove of the music. It's a bit of an oxymoron."
7. We Love Your Apathy "This song is about how we keep voting in the same piece-of-shit government, and how the Labour Party are condoning this apathy. I always vote, though. I like to have a voice, even if it is a tactical vote."
8. Brazen (Weep) "This opens with quite a demonic laugh, which fits in with the dark, violent mood of the song. Like 'Twisted', this is about the extremely sad situation I was in."
9. Pickin On Me "We have never done a song with just guitar and vocals before, but it works well on this song. It was inspired by someone I knew at school who really wound me up and was always up the teacher's arse. You just knew he was going to grow up to be a policeman, and he did. It's about how racism really starts in the classroom."
10. Milk Is My Sugar "This is a fucking disgusting song about sex. My mum asked me what it's about and I said breakfast and she believed me. I bet some squirmy little bastard will show her a copy of Select now!"
11. Glorious Pop Song "This song was originally called 'You're Still A Strange One'. It was so poppy that we got worried that the record company would release it and that we would become known for it, like Extreme did with 'More Than Words'. When we recorded it, we covered it with swear words, so it will never be a single."

== Hidden tracks ==
The album contains a number of hidden tracks and surprises for the listener. The first is hidden before the start of track 1 (0:35 or 2:38 long, depending on release), it is an instrumental mix of the song "100 ways to be a good girl" taken from the first album. After track 3 (1:31), 7 (0:40) and 9 (0:57) there is a short jam which can be accessed directly by rewinding from tracks 4, 8, and 10 respectively. Technically it exists in the pause between the end of one track and the beginning of another. CD players can sometimes be seen counting down to zero while they play these hidden tracks. Some rippers will often append these hidden tracks to the end of the previous song.

The final track, "Glorious Pop Song", ends at 3:43 and is followed by two seconds of silence followed by a recorded conversation which is mostly laughter that lasts for around 30 seconds.

== Personnel ==
Skunk Anansie

- Skin – vocals, theremin, backing vocals
- Cass – bass guitar, backing vocals
- Ace – guitars
- Mark Richardson – drums, percussion, backing vocals

== Charts ==
=== Weekly charts ===
Weekly chart performance for Stoosh
Chart (1996–1997)	Peak position
Australian Albums (ARIA)	37
Austrian Albums (Ö3 Austria)	6
Belgian Albums (Ultratop Flanders)	14
Belgian Albums (Ultratop Wallonia)	22
Dutch Albums (Album Top 100)	5
Finnish Albums (Suomen virallinen lista)	11
French Albums (SNEP)	31
German Albums (Offizielle Top 100)	11
Italian Albums (FIMI)	17
Norwegian Albums (VG-lista)	8
Scottish Albums (OCC)	15
Swedish Albums (Sverigetopplistan)	18
Swiss Albums (Schweizer Hitparade)	8
UK Albums (OCC)	9
UK Independent Albums (OCC)	5
UK Rock & Metal Albums (OCC)	1

=== Year-end charts ===
Year-end chart performance for Stoosh
Chart (1997)	Position
Austrian Albums (Ö3 Austria)	28
Belgian Albums (Ultratop Flanders)	87
Belgian Albums (Ultratop Wallonia)	93
Dutch Albums (Album Top 100)	28
German Albums Chart	28
Italian Albums (FIMI)	30
Swedish Albums (Sverigetopplistan)	100
Swiss Albums (Schweizer Hitparade)	25
UK Albums (OCC)	33

== Certifications and sales ==
Region	Certification	Certified units/sales
Austria (IFPI Austria)	Gold	25,000^{*}
Belgium (BRMA)	Gold	25,000^{*}
France (SNEP)	Gold	100,000^{*}
Germany (BVMI)	Gold	250,000^{^}
Iceland	—	6,721
Italy (FIMI)	3× Platinum	300,000
Netherlands (NVPI)	Gold	50,000^{^}
Norway (IFPI Norway)	Gold	25,000^{*}
Sweden (GLF)	Gold	40,000^{^}
Switzerland (IFPI Switzerland)	Gold	25,000^{^}
United Kingdom (BPI)	Platinum	300,000^{^}
United States	—	30,000
^{*} Sales figures based on certification alone.^{^} Shipments figures based on certification alone.
