= Paranoid & Sunburnt =

1995 studio album by Skunk Anansie

Studio album by Skunk Anansie
- Released: 18 September 1995
- Recorded: 1994–1995
- Studio: Great Linford Manor (Milton Keynes, England)
- Genre: Alternative rock; hard rock; punk rock
- Length: 44:10
- Label: One Little Indian; Epic
- Producer: Sylvia Massy; Skunk Anansie

Skunk Anansie chronology
Paranoid & Sunburnt (1995)	Stoosh (1996)

Singles from Paranoid & Sunburnt
- 1. "Selling Jesus" Released: 13 March 1995; 2. "I Can Dream" Released: 5 June 1995; 3. "Charity" Released: 21 August 1995; 4. "Weak" Released: 15 January 1996

Professional ratings
Review scores
Source	Rating
AllMusic	3/5 stars
The Austin Chronicle	4/5 stars
Christgau's Consumer Guide	(neither)
The Guardian	3/5 stars
Los Angeles Times	3/4 stars
NME	8/10
Select	3/5

Paranoid & Sunburnt is the debut studio album by the British rock band Skunk Anansie, first released in 1995 via One Little Indian Records. It was re-released in 2005 with a DVD featuring the videos to the singles. This album was recorded with the band's original drummer, Robbie France, but he is not featured on the cover. The album, featuring a mix of controversial protest songs (mainly about politics and religion), peaked at number 8 in the UK Albums Chart.

== Track listing ==
All tracks are written by Skin and Len Arran; except where noted.

No.	Title	Writer(s)	Length
1.	"Selling Jesus"		3:45
2.	"Intellectualise My Blackness"		3:45
3.	"I Can Dream"		3:51
4.	"Little Baby Swastikkka"		4:04
5.	"All in the Name of Pity"		3:23
6.	"Charity"		4:33
7.	"It Takes Blood & Guts to Be This Cool But I'm Still Just a Cliche"		4:12
8.	"Weak"	Skin, Ace, Richard Lewis, Robert France	3:34
9.	"And Here I Stand"	Skin, Ace, Richard Lewis, Robert France	5:14
10.	"100 Ways to Be a Good Girl"		3:58
11.	"Rise Up"		4:05

== Singles ==
"Little Baby Swastikkka" was the first release from the album. It was not a commercial release, however. It was a radio single and only 2,000 copies were pressed.

"Selling Jesus" was the first commercial single release from the album. Released in March 1995, it peaked at No. 46 in the UK Singles Chart. It also appeared on the Strange Days soundtrack. It is written in protest of religion and politics, and in particular Christianity. The single is taken from their debut album, Paranoid & Sunburnt, and reached number 46 on the UK Singles Chart. Three added B-sides were included on the CD release, with track 4 'Skunk Song' being written by Ace, R. France, C. Lewis and Skin. There are two versions of the video, the first video was directed by production team Gob TV, who also directed the video for "I Can Dream", and the second video was directed by Kathryn Bigelow, for their film Strange Days.

"I Can Dream" was the follow-up single, released in June 1995, and charted at No. 41.

"Charity" was the third single, released in August 1995, and charted at No. 40. It was re-released in 1996 (see below).

"Weak" was the fourth single, released in January 1996, and charted at No. 20.

"Charity" was re-released in April 1996 and its peak chart position was higher than the original release. It peaked at No. 20.

== Personnel ==
- Deborah "Skin" Dyer – lead vocals, guitar, theremin, piano, keyboards
- Martin "Ace" Kent – guitar, backing vocals
- Richard "Cass" Lewis – bass, guitar, backing vocals
- Robbie France – drums, percussion, backing vocals

Technical

- Andy Wallace – mixing
- Donald Christie – photography

== Charts ==
=== Weekly charts ===
Weekly chart performance for Paranoid & Sunburnt
Chart (1995–1996)	Peak position
Australian Albums (ARIA)	61
Austrian Albums (Ö3 Austria)	19
Belgian Albums (Ultratop Flanders)	8
Belgian Albums (Ultratop Wallonia)	24
Dutch Albums (Album Top 100)	22
German Albums (Offizielle Top 100)	37
Norwegian Albums (VG-lista)	34
Scottish Albums (OCC)	14
Swedish Albums (Sverigetopplistan)	7
UK Albums (OCC)	8
Chart (1998)	Peak position
UK Independent Albums (OCC)	9

=== Year-end charts ===
Year-end chart performance for Paranoid & Sunburnt
Chart (1996)	Position
UK Albums (OCC)	65

== Certifications ==
Certifications for Paranoid & Sunburnt
Region	Certification	Certified units/sales
Netherlands (NVPI)	Platinum	100,000^{^}
United Kingdom (BPI)	Platinum	300,000^{^}
^{^} Shipments figures based on certification alone.
