= Post Orgasmic Chill =

1999 studio album by Skunk Anansie

Studio album by Skunk Anansie
- Released: 22 March 1999
- Recorded: 1998–1999
- Studios: Clinton (New York City); Bearsville (Bearsville, New York)
- Genres: Alternative rock; indie rock; hard rock; alternative metal
- Length: 50:50
- Label: Virgin
- Producer: Andy Wallace

Skunk Anansie chronology
Stoosh (1996)	Post Orgasmic Chill (1999)	Smashes and Trashes (2009)

Singles from Post Orgasmic Chill
- 1. "Charlie Big Potato" Released: 1 March 1999; 2. "Secretly" Released: 10 May 1999; 3. "Lately" Released: 26 July 1999; 4. "You'll Follow Me Down" Released: 25 October 1999

Professional ratings
Review scores
Source	Rating
AllMusic	3.5/5 stars
NME	8/10

Post Orgasmic Chill is the third studio album by British rock band Skunk Anansie, first released in 1999. Two album covers exist: the European version with the band lounging in an oceanside apartment, and the American version with the band standing on the Atlantic City boardwalk. It was a complete departure from their previous two albums, which had elements of punk rock and alternative rock, towards a new harder sound with elements of hard rock and alternative metal. It took eleven years for the group to release their next album, Wonderlustre.

Two-disc 25th Anniversary Expanded Edition was released in 2024.

== Etymology ==
The album title resembles the title of the 13th song, a Japanese bonus track called "Post Orgasmic Sleep".

== Legacy ==
The album was included in the book 1001 Albums You Must Hear Before You Die.

== Track listing ==
All tracks written by Skunk Anansie; except where indicated

Post Orgasmic Chill track listing
No.	Title	Writer(s)	Length
1.	"Charlie Big Potato"		5:32
2.	"On My Hotel T.V."		3:34
3.	"We Don't Need Who You Think You Are"		4:21
4.	"Tracy's Flaw"	Skin, Ace, Len Arran	4:30
5.	"The Skank Heads"		3:11
6.	"Lately"		3:53
7.	"Secretly"	Skin, Len Arran	4:45
8.	"Good Things Don't Always Come to You"	Skin, Ace, Len Arran	5:25
9.	"Cheap Honesty"	Skin, Len Arran	3:47
10.	"You'll Follow Me Down"	Skin, Len Arran	4:01
11.	"And This Is Nothing That I Thought I Had"		3:04
12.	"I'm Not Afraid"		4:48
13.	"Post Orgasmic Sleep" (Japan bonus track)		5:17

== Personnel ==
Skunk Anansie

- Skin – vocals, theremin, vibraphone
- Cass – electric bass, acoustic bass, programming
- Ace – electric guitar, acoustic guitar
- Mark Richardson – drums, percussion

Other personnel

- Wil Malone – strings, arrangement, conductor
- Michael Nash Associates – design
- Clif Norrell – engineering
- Chris Laidlaw – assistant engineering
- Howie Weinberg – mastering
- Steve Sisco – assistant mixing
- Andy Wallace – production, mixing

== Charts ==
=== Weekly charts ===
Weekly chart performance for Post Orgasmic Chill
Chart (1999)	Peak position
Australian Albums (ARIA)	56
Austrian Albums (Ö3 Austria)	6
Belgian Albums (Ultratop Flanders)	6
Belgian Albums (Ultratop Wallonia)	25
Dutch Albums (Album Top 100)	10
Finnish Albums (Suomen virallinen lista)	12
French Albums (SNEP)	19
German Albums (Offizielle Top 100)	5
New Zealand Albums (RMNZ)	27
Norwegian Albums (VG-lista)	8
Scottish Albums (Official Charts)	24
Swedish Albums (Sverigetopplistan)	31
Swiss Albums (Schweizer Hitparade)	10
UK Albums (Official Charts)	16
UK Rock & Metal Albums (Official Charts)	1
Chart (2019)	Peak position
UK Independent Albums (Official Charts)	29

=== Year-end charts ===
Year-end chart performance for Post Orgasmic Chill
Chart (1999)	Position
Austrian Albums (Ö3 Austria)	49
Belgian Albums (Ultratop Flanders)	47
Dutch Albums (Album Top 100)	47
German Albums (Offizielle Top 100)	57

== Certifications ==
Certifications for Post Orgasmic Chill
Region	Certification	Certified units/sales
Austria (IFPI Austria)	Gold	25,000^{*}
Italy (FIMI)	3× Platinum	300,000
Switzerland (IFPI Switzerland)	Gold	25,000^{^}
United Kingdom (BPI)	Gold	100,000^{^}
Summaries
Europe (IFPI)	Platinum	1,000,000^{*}
^{*} Sales figures based on certification alone.^{^} Shipments figures based on certification alone.
