= Skin (musician) =

British singer (born 1967)

Skin OBE
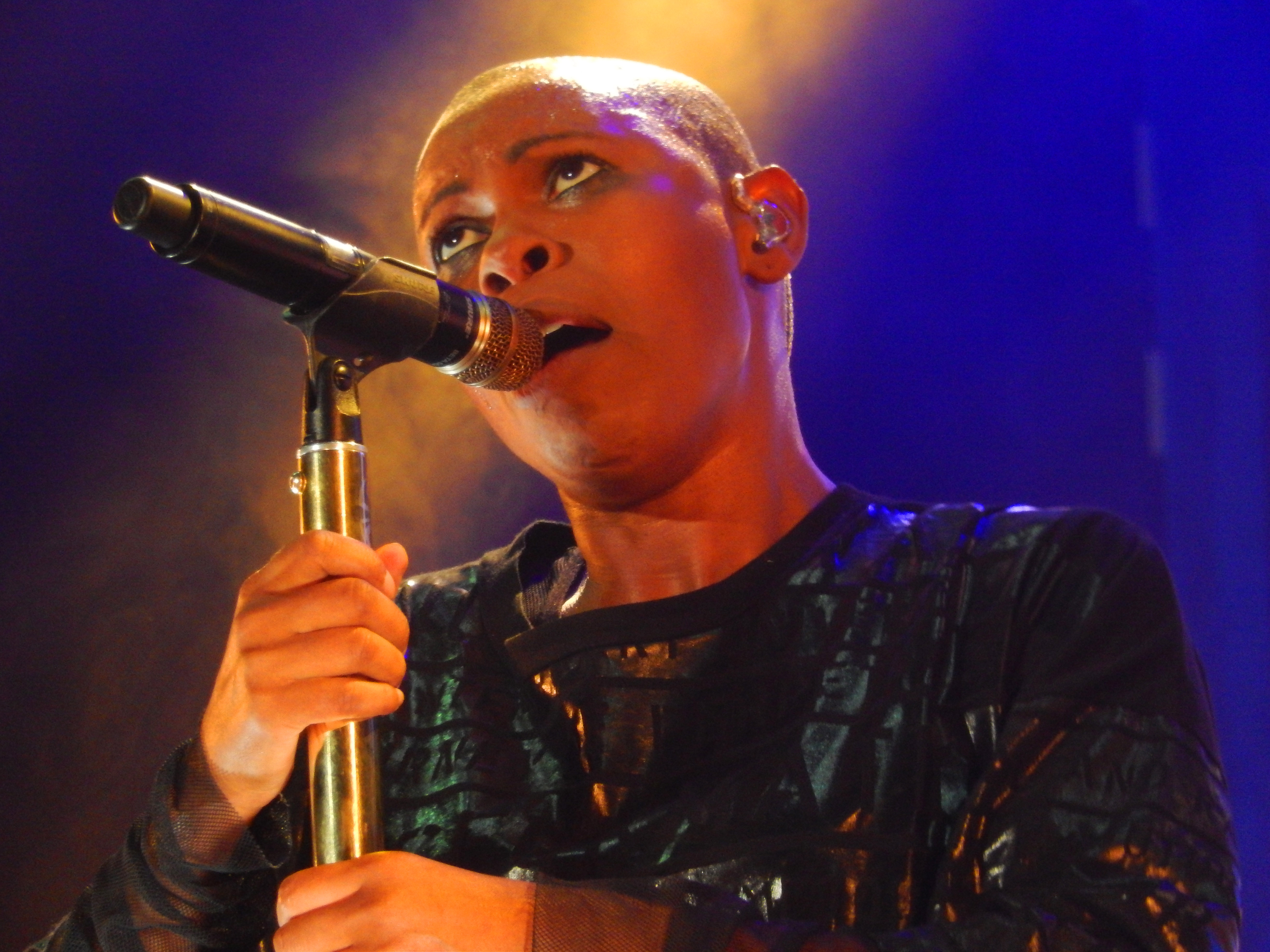
- Skin in 2016

Background information
- Born: Deborah Ann Dyer; 3 August 1967 (age 59); Brixton, London, England
- Genres: Indie rock; alternative rock; alternative metal
- Occupations: Singer; musician; songwriter
- Instruments: Vocals; guitar; keyboards; theremin; tambourine
- Works: Discography
- Years active: 1994–present
- Labels: One Little Indian; Virgin; EMI; V2
- Member of: Skunk Anansie
- Website: www.skinmusic.com

Deborah Anne Dyer OBE (born 3 August 1967), known mononymously by the stage name Skin, is a British singer, musician and songwriter. She is the lead vocalist of Skunk Anansie, who are often grouped as part of the Britrock movement in the UK, and has gained attention for her powerful, wide-ranging soprano voice and striking look.

In 2015, Skin joined the judging panel of the Italian version of the talent show The X Factor for one season, and in 2016 she was on the cover of the UK lesbian magazine Diva. After releasing new music and touring with Skunk Anansie, in 2018 Skin was featured as one of the cover stars of Classic Rock magazine's special "She Rocks" issue and was honoured with the Inspirational Artist Award at the Music Week Awards ahead of celebrating 25 years of Skunk Anansie. She also appeared on the cover of Kerrang! magazine in November 2018.

Mavis Bayton, author of Frock Rock, stated that "women like Skin, Natacha Atlas, Yolanda Charles, and Debbie Smith are now acting as crucial role models for future generations of black women".

== Early life ==
Deborah Ann Dyer was born on 3 August 1967 in Brixton, London, to Jamaican parents. Her father, Kenneth, was in the Royal Air Force and later worked on oil rigs. Her mother, Patricia, was born in Jamaica in 1944. Patricia moved to England in 1961 and after working as a nurse, took a government position in the environmental department. She describes her parents as "very strict, very Jamaican". Aged six, she moved into a two-up two-down in Acre Lane, with her grandfather, who ran a nightclub in the basement, in which she mentions there was "always music and rum" and posters of Bob Marley and Muhammad Ali, which inspired her. As a child, she wanted to be a pianist. Aged 14, she read Macbeth, later stating that she loved the "intricacy and complexity of Shakespeare's play".

Skin graduated with a BA (Hons) degree in Interior Architecture and Design from Teesside Polytechnic in 1989 and received an honorary Master of Arts degree from Teesside University in 2000.

== Skunk Anansie ==
The band formed in 1994, releasing three albums, Paranoid & Sunburnt, Stoosh and Post Orgasmic Chill. They sold more than five million records worldwide. Their biggest hit was the single "Weak". They disbanded in 2001, after which Skin embarked on a solo career, and reformed in 2009. As of 2024 the band have released six studio albums and toured with David Bowie, U2, and Lenny Kravitz.

== Solo career ==
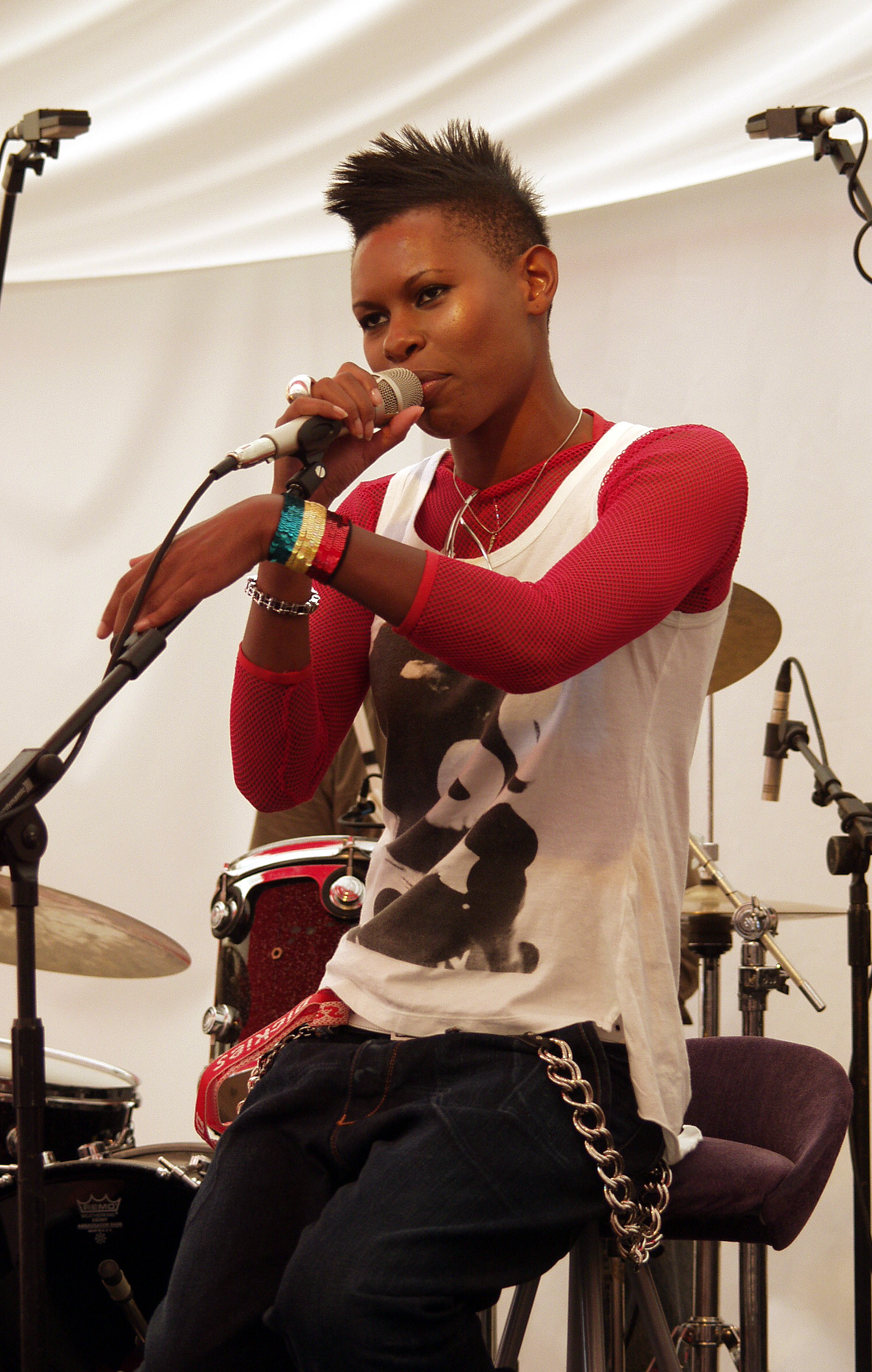
Skin performing in 2003

After Skunk Anansie split, Skin released her debut solo album Fleshwounds. The album was toned down from her Skunk Anansie days and did not gain the same acclaim from Skunk Anansie fans. She even ditched her trademark bald look and grew her hair into a boyish crop. While the album was not a massive success in the UK, two singles were released from it: "Trashed" and "Faithfulness". "Lost", a double A-side with "Getting Away with It". Skin felt that her record company didn't put any money or effort into promoting the album in England. She felt they did better in Europe with the album selling over half a million copies.

After releasing Fleshwounds, Skin went on to perform various solo gigs around Europe. She was also support for the European leg of Robbie Williams' and Placebo's world tours. Soon after touring, she began to record her second album, Fake Chemical State, which was released for sale on 20 March 2006, preceded by new single "Just Let the Sun" two weeks earlier. The first single actually issued from this album was "Alone in My Room", a download-only track released on 7 November 2005. "Alone in My Room" was also the name given to Skin's first solo tour in two years, which commenced in Berlin in November 2005. For this album she shaved her head bald again, returning to the look she had in her Skunk Anansie days.

Skin's next solo outing was a small promotional "Fake Chemical State" tour. It started in Glasgow on 17 March 2006. She went on to perform many festivals around Europe including Rock Werchter in Belgium and the Southside/Hurricane festivals in Germany. She performed on the main stage at most of these festivals. In February 2008, she announced that she was working with Timo Maas and Martin Buttrich on a side project called "Format-3". Her 2008 song "Tear Down These Houses" was released as a part of the soundtrack to Parlami d'Amore, directed by Silvio Muccino. She sings in the opening musical piece "Renaissance", in Medici: Masters of Florence, a Netflix original series released in October 2016.

Skin has always had a love of electronic music and she moved into the genre when her friend Damian Lazarus gave her a mixer in 2009. Going under the moniker D-Dyer she made her first steps into the DJ world which she has now been doing for the past decade. She plays Techno, Tech House and Minimal all over the world at classic venues such as Output in New York, Sound Nightclub in LA and Fabric in London.

In 2015 Skin collaborated with techno icon Nicole Moudaber and they released the Breed EP on Nicole's Mood Records. It features five tracks including "Don't Talk To Me I'm Dancing". In 2016 she DJ-ed at Carl Cox's Revolution in Ibiza, Coachella and also released Techno music under the guise of Juvenal through Mood Records. In 2020, Skin participated in the UK version of The Masked Singer, appearing as Duck. Her identity was revealed in episode six, when she was eliminated. A memoir, It Takes Blood and Guts, co-written with Lucy O'Brien, was published by Simon & Schuster in September 2020. On 18 October 2020, Skin began presenting a Sunday-night radio show titled The Skin Show on Absolute Radio.

== Personal life ==
Skin is openly queer. In 2013, she entered into a civil partnership with Christiana Wyly, daughter of American billionaire Sam Wyly. The relationship ended in 2015. In September 2020, Skin announced her engagement to Rayne Baron. They have a daughter, born in 2021.

In January 2021, Skin assumed the role of Chancellor at Leeds Arts University in Leeds, England. She was appointed Officer of the Order of the British Empire (OBE) in the 2021 Birthday Honours for services to music.

== Political views ==
Since the United Kingdom European Union membership referendum in 2016, Skin has spoken against Brexit and what she sees as its effect in terms of a rise in racism, labour shortages and the impoverishment of British culture in numerous interviews. After the results of the 2022 Italian general election were announced, Skin said she was disappointed that the Italian people voted for Giorgia Meloni and that Italy was "sinking towards fascism" once again.

== Discography ==
=== Solo studio albums ===
- Fleshwounds (2003)
- Fake Chemical State (2006)

=== Guest appearances ===
- Vocals on "Carmen Queasy" from Maxim's (of The Prodigy) 2000 solo album, Hell's Kitchen – UK Chart Number 33
- Vocals on "Licking Cream" from Sevendust's second album, Home
- Vocals on "You Can't Find Peace", by Pale3, which was made for the Tom Tykwer film Der Krieger und die Kaiserin (The Princess and the Warrior)
- Vocals on "Good Times", by Ed Case – UK Chart Number 68
- Vocals on "If This Ain't Love" by Erick Morillo & Eddie Thoneick – released 2012
- Contributes vocals to "Still Standing" from Unity – The Official Athens 2004 Olympic Games Album
- Performs "Kill Everything" on the OST of L'Empire des Loups
- Contributes vocals to "La Canzone Che Scrivo Per Te" on the album Che Cosa Vedi by Marlene Kuntz
- Contributes vocals on "Stagioni D'Amore" (Seasons of Love) from the cast album to the Italian production ofRent
- Vocals on "Meat" from Tony Iommi's album Iommi
- Vocals on "Comfort of Strangers" on the OST to Timecode
- Vocals on "Remains" on the third part of Bastille's Other People's Heartache EP
- Contributes to charity single "It's Only Rock And Roll"
- "Not an Addict" (with K's Choice) – live at Pinkpop 1996
- "Army of Me" (with Björk) – live version on Top of the Pops, 5 May 1995
- "Anti Love Song" (Betty Davis cover; live on Taratata with Lenny Kravitz)
- Vocals on "Nothing Matters" by Mark Knight.

== Sources ==
- Roberts, David (2006). British Hit Singles & Albums (19th ed.). London: Guinness World Records Limited. ISBN 1-904994-10-5.
