= Pointfest =

Outdoor rock music festival

- Genre: Hard rock, heavy metal, punk
- Dates: Various
- Locations: Maryland Heights, Missouri, United States
- Years active: 1993–present

Pointfest is a large outdoor rock music festival held annually by radio station KPNT in St. Louis, Missouri, at the Hollywood Casino Amphitheatre (formerly known as Verizon Wireless Amphitheater, UMB Bank Pavilion, and Riverport Amphitheater). Local music favorites the Urge, Gravity Kills, Story of the Year, Ludo, and Greek Fire have made several appearances as well.

Traditionally, there is a main stage where the larger acts and headliners perform, and two or more stages off to the sides of the lawn for other bands (one of them usually reserved for local bands). The side stages will play from the start of the concert (generally around 10 am) to when the main stage will start playing (generally around 6 pm).

== Pointfest 1 ==
Held on September 11, 1993

- Matthew Sweet
- They Might Be Giants
- Hothouse Flowers
- Aimee Mann
- Midnight Oil
- Dramarama

== Pointfest 2 ==
Known as Pointfest '94, it was held on Saturday, August 20, 1994.

- 311
- The Urge
- Lisa Loeb
- MC 900 Ft. Jesus
- The Smithereens
- Material Issue
- They Might Be Giants
- Violent Femmes
- The SKoubies

== Pointfest 3 ==
Originally known as Pointfest '95, it ended up being the first of two Pointfests in 1995. It was held on May 26, 1995.

- Toad the Wet Sprocket
- Bush
- Faith No More
- Blues Traveler
- Sponge
- Collective Soul
- The Stone Roses

== Pointfest 4 ==
This Pointfest was known as Pointfest 4, the first numbering of Pointfests, it was the second festival in 1995, held on August 19, 1995

- Ramones
- Everclear
- The Urge
- They Might Be Giants
- Big Audio Dynamite
- Matthew Sweet
- Better Than Ezra
- The Nixons
- Ben Folds Five
- Gren
- Jewel- played a short acoustic set
- Blink-182
- The Dambuilders
- New World Spirits
- Great Big Everything
- Phunk Junkeez
- Dishwalla
- Stir

== Pointfest 5 ==
Held on May 27, 1996

- Candlebox
- Gravity Kills
- Garbage
- Cracker
- No Doubt
- Jars of Clay
- Everclear
- Love & Rockets
- Seven Mary Three
- Luster
- God Lives Underwater
- Pulp
- Poe
- Triplefast Action
- Goldfinger

== Pointfest 6 ==
Held on September 8, 1996

- 311
- The Urge
- Soul Asylum
- Cheap Trick
- Descendents
- Stir
- The Nixons
- They Might Be Giants
- Dishwalla
- Nada Surf
- The Refreshments
- Reacharound
- I Mother Earth
- New World Spirits
- Primitive Radio Gods

== Pointfest 7 ==
Held on May 17, 1997, the first of two festivals in 1997

- Matchbox Twenty
- Bloodhound Gang
- L7
- Soul Kiss
- Stir
- Social Distortion
- The Offspring
- Reel Big Fish
- Jungle Dogs
- Red Five
- That Dog
- AFI
- Ultrafink
- Recliners
- Radio Iodine

== Pointfest 8 ==
Held on May 26, 1997 (show #2)

- Third Eye Blind
- The Verve Pipe
- Beck
- Rollins Band
- Orbit
- Cunninghams
- K's Choice
- Local H
- Echo & the Bunnymen
- Better Than Ezra
- The Mighty Mighty Bosstones
- Pave the Rocket
- Skunk Anansie
- Cowboy Junkies
- Cowboy Mouth

== Pointfest 9 ==
Held on May 24, 1998

Hosted by Matt Pinfield of MTV.

- Foo Fighters
- Green Day
- Creed
- Deftones
- Semisonic
- Econoline Crush
- Big Wreck
- The Reverend Horton Heat
- Soul Kiss
- Gravity Kills
- Rocket from the Crypt
- Atomic Fireballs
- Wank
- Anthenaeum
- God Lives Underwater

== Pointfest 10 ==
Held on September 5, 1998

- Candlebox
- The Urge
- Seven Mary Three
- Fuel
- Reel Big Fish
- Local H
- K's Choice
- They Might Be Giants
- Fragile Porcelain Mice
- Smash Mouth
- Stabbing Westward
- Feeder
- Stella Soleil
- Monster Magnet

== Pointfest 11 ==
Held on May 23, 1999 (all times St. Louis local)

Main Stage

- Red Hot Chili Peppers at 9:30 p.m.
- Hole at 8:00 p.m.
- Silverchair at 6:45 p.m
- Blink-182 at 5:35 p.m
- Orgy at 4:25 p.m
- 2 Skinnee J's at 3:15 p.m.
- Modern Day Zero (performing as Mesh) at 2:05 p.m

Front Stage

- Lit at 7:30 p.m.
- Econoline Crush at 6:15 p.m.
- Bellyfeel at 4:55 p.m.
- Citizen King at 3:55 p.m.
- Die Symphony at 2:35 p.m.
- Thisway at 1:05 p.m.

== Pointfest 12 ==
Held on May 21, 2000

Slipknot and Mudvayne were scheduled to perform at Pointfest 12 but canceled on the day of the show for unknown reasons.

- 311
- The Mighty Mighty Bosstones
- Everclear
- Our Lady Peace
- Goldfinger
- The Nixons
- Stir
- MxPx
- Die Symphony
- Toadies
- Mesh
- Blue October
- 8stops7
- Colony

== Pointfest 13 ==
Held on May 20, 2001

- Weezer
- Run-D.M.C.
- Staind
- Fuel
- Our Lady Peace
- Toadies
- Alien Ant Farm
- Mesh
- Hed PE
- Lucky Boys Confusion
- Puddle of Mudd
- Tantric
- Cold
- Saliva
- Monster Magnet

== Pointfest 14 ==
Held on May 19, 2002 Big Blue Monkey won the contest for the opening slot on the bill at Pointfest 14, and managed to get one of their videos onto the tour bus of Goldfinger. The video immediately grabbed the attention of vocalist John Feldmann, which paid off in a spot touring with Goldfinger, a major record deal, and a name change to Story of the Year.

Main Stage

- Sevendust
- Our Lady Peace
- The X-Ecutioners
- Mesh STL
- Hoobastank
- Reel Big Fish
- Tenacious D
- Local H

Second Stage

- Goldfinger
- Unwritten Law
- The Apex Theory
- Dashboard Confessional
- Quarashi
- Trik Turner
- Lostprophets

Third Stage

- 3rd Strike
- Ash
- Greenwheel
- Headstrong
- Moth
- Pressure 4-5
- Big Blue Monkey

== Pointfest 15 ==
Held on June 8, 2003

New Empire was the local band contest winner, which earned them a spot in the lineup.

Main Stage

- Staind
- Hed PE
- Breaking Benjamin
- Cold
- The Used
- The All-American Rejects
- Seether
- Socialburn

Second Stage

- Trapt
- Finch
- Ra
- Smile Empty Soul
- Cavo
- New Empire
- Ripd

== Pointfest 16 ==
Held on June 5, 2004,

The Von Bondies were scheduled to perform but failed to arrive due to problems with their tour bus.

Main Stage

- The Urge
- Breaking Benjamin
- Papa Roach

Side Stages

- Story of the Year
- Lit
- Sugarcult
- Flaw
- Thornley
- The Adored
- Auf de Maur
- Crossfade
- Apartment 26
- Modern Day Zero
- Shaman's Harvest
- Adair

== Pointfest 17 ==
Held on May 15, 2005

The Exies were scheduled to perform but did not play due to an illness. TRUSTcompany was also scheduled but canceled their performance amid personal issues with band members and issues with their record label. They officially announced their breakup a couple months later.

- Breaking Benjamin
- Mudvayne
- Story of the Year
- Modern Day Zero
- Sum 41
- Unwritten Law
- Life of Agony
- American Head Charge
- Mudworm
- Bloodsimple
- No Address
- Mourningside
- Ultra Blue
- Hed PE
- Apartment 26

== Pointfest 18 ==
Held on May 6, 2006. Blue October was scheduled to play. However, as a result of lead singer Justin Furstenfeld's broken leg, the band did not play.

- Coheed and Cambria
- Avenged Sevenfold
- Shinedown
- Trapt
- 10 Years
- Hurt
- People in Planes
- Bril
- Autovein
- Rock Kills Kid
- Bullets and Octane
- Eighteen Visions
- Damone
- ThreeSixtySmile

== Pointfest 19 ==
Held on August 5, 2006.

- Staind
- Breaking Benjamin
- Hurt
- Blue October
- Three Days Grace
- Buckcherry
- Evans Blue
- Black Stone Cherry
- Inimical Drive

== Pointfest 20 ==
Held on Saturday, May 12, 2007, at the newly renamed amphitheater Verizon Wireless Amphitheater St. Louis

Mainstage

- Lye (mainstage winner)
- Red Romance
- The Red Jumpsuit Apparatus
- Wolfmother
- The Killers

Side Stages

- Bullet for My Valentine
- Say Anything
- Modern Day Zero
- Papa Roach
- The Exies
- Flyleaf
- Smile Empty Soul
- Dropping Daylight
- Autovein
- Madina Lake
- Blackpool Lights
- Straylight Run
- Operator
- DeFunkt
- In Fear and Faith

Local bands

- Ava, Wait
- The New Embrace
- In Fear & Faith
- Lye (main stage winner)
- Dead By Tuesday
- Bi-Level
- Murder in a Tuxedo
- Cavo
- Shaman's Harvest
- Sonic Reducer
- 360 Smile
- Arythma

== Pointfest 21 ==
September 30, 2007 - Verizon Wireless Amphitheater

- Hed PE was originally scheduled to play but they were removed from the lineup. The band cited issues getting one of their members a passport to make it back from their European dates. Reported issues were linked to the member's past encounters with law enforcement officials. Pointfest was to be the first date of their US tour.

Main Stage

- Breaking Benjamin
- Three Days Grace
- Seether
- Finger Eleven was originally scheduled to play but the lead singer lost his voice.
- 13 Days (mainstage winner)

Iron Age Studios Stage

- Copperview
- The Daybreak Boys
- 12 Stones
- Evans Blue
- Hurt
- Saliva
- Chevelle

Main Street Bistro Stage

- Shaman's Harvest
- Lapush
- Sick Puppies
- The Starting Line
- Mutemath
- Sum 41

Pop's Local Stage

- Behind the Blindfold
- Brookroyal
- D-railed
- Blinded Black
- Allusive
- Soul Descenders
- Social Slave
- Leo
- eclectic fusion

== Pointfest 22 ==
Sunday, May 18, 2008- Verizon Wireless Amphitheater

Atreyu was scheduled to play the main stage, but they were forced to cancel, because the band's flight from Los Angeles was grounded. Sick Puppies canceled due to a death in the family. Blind Melon was scheduled to play the Jägermeister Stage, but the band canceled. Rogers Stevens of Blind Melon explained the cancellation on the band's website by stating "There are some political things afoot that it's best for me not to go into. In addition, we were mistakenly booked for 5 shows in a row, which we didn't know about until last week." Local band Severed Ties also had to cancel due to their drummer sustaining an injury from a car accident.

Main Stage

- Serj Tankian
- Shinedown
- Killswitch Engage
- Filter

New Amsterdam Stage

- Coheed & Cambria
- Hurt
- Ludo
- 10 Years
- RED
- SafetySuit
- Cavo

Jägermeister Stage

- Finger Eleven
- Copperview
- Cavo
- Theory of a Deadman
- Scary Kids Scaring Kids
- LucaBrasi

Pop's Local Stage

- Iron Fist Dillusion
- The New Translation
- Soul Descenders
- Sunday but Summer
- Course of Nature
- Strych 9 Hollow
- Bare Knuckle Conflict
- Feed the Flame
- Inimical Drive
- Severed Ties (canceled due to injury of the drummer)
- Never My Silence
- Fivefold

== Pointfest 23 ==
Saturday, September 20, 2008, at 10:00 am - Verizon Wireless Amphitheater

Avenged Sevenfold was scheduled but canceled citing vocalist M. Shadows (Matt Sanders) needed to rest his ailing voice. The band would resume its tour dates on October 15. Toryn Green, the lead singer for Fuel, sang for Apocalyptica. This was the first Pointfest to feature the two side stages to be next to each other. So after a band on the Black Stage would get done, then a band on the White stage would start almost immediately.

Main Stage

- Seether
- Shinedown
- Puddle of Mudd
- Bullet for My Valentine
- Apocalyptica

Black Stage

- The Upright Animals
- Ava, Wait
- Miser
- Copperview
- Sick Puppies
- Local H
- Story of the Year

White Stage

- Red Line Chemistry
- Brookroyal
- Black Tide
- Saving Abel
- Ludo

Pops Stage

- Ready the Cannons
- Tell Tale Heart
- 12 Summers Old
- Soul Descenders
- Minutes to Midnight
- Everyday Drive

== Pointfest 24 ==
May 23, 2009 Verizon Wireless Amphitheater

The New Translation was the Pop's local show winner to open up on the side stages.

Main Stage

- The Offspring
- Chevelle
- Taking Back Sunday
- Sick Puppies
- The Used

White Stage

- The New Translation
- Inimical Drive
- The Parlor Mob
- Hed PE
- Cavo
- Anberlin
- Ludo

Black Stage

- Street Dogs
- Greek Fire
- Framing Hanley
- Shiny Toy Guns
- Hurt
- Blue October

Local Stage

- Isabella
- Killer Me Killer You
- Sunday But Summer
- Arythma
- Opposites Attack
- All Fall Down
- Fer De Lance
- Stone Dog Diaries
- Defiance Pointe
- Amorath
- The Gorge

== Pointfest 25 ==
Pointfest 25 was on August 23, 2009, and boasted "35 bands for $35.00." Killer Me Killer You won the Pop's Battle to Open Pointfest and greeted the crowd at 10 am by showering them with Pop Tarts for breakfast.

Main Stage Start

- Our Lady Peace 5:30 pm
- Atreyu 6:25 pm
- Chevelle 7:30 pm
- Shinedown 8:30 pm
- Staind 9:45 pm

Energy Side Stage Start

- Killer Me Killer You 10:00 am
- Burn Halo 11:00 am
- Billy Boy on Poison 12:10 pm
- Brookroyal 1:20 pm
- Living Things 1:20 pm
- Trapt 3:40 pm
- Hollywood Undead 5:00 pm

Buckle Up Arrive Alive Stage Start

- Copperview 10:25 am
- The Veer Union 11:35 am
- Halestorm 12:45 am
- Evans Blue 1:55 pm
- All That Remains 3:05 pm
- Street Sweeper Social Club 4:15 pm

Best Buy Musical Instruments Stage Start

- Aranda 11:00 am
- Janus 12:00 pm
- Red Line Chemistry 1:00 pm
- Lucabrasi 2:00 pm
- Shaman's Harvest 3:00 pm
- Messe 4:00 pm

Pop's Stage Start

- Allusive 10:10 am
- Iron Fist Dillusion 11:10 am
- Make Me Break Me 11:30 am
- Life Among the Dead 12:10 pm
- Strata-G 12:50 pm
- Final Drive 1:30 pm
- From Mars to Venus 2:10 pm
- Arythma 2:50 pm
- Persona Crown 3:30 pm
- Exit 714 4:10 pm
- Saence 4:50 pm

== Pointfest 26 ==
Pointfest 26 was on June 6, 2010, at Verizon Wireless Amphitheater in Maryland Heights, Mo. Hurt was originally scheduled to play but canceled due to illness. Autovein played in their place.

- Three Days Grace
- Seether
- Papa Roach
- Coheed & Cambria
- Saliva

Side Stages

- Hollywood Undead
- Story of the Year
- Janus
- Brookroyal
- Crash Kings
- Flobots
- Motion City Soundtrack
- Shaman's Harvest
- Greek Fire
- Autovein
- Jonathan Tyler and the Northern Lights
- Pop's Nightclub winner: Opposites Attack

Pop's Local Stage

- Delta
- Inimical Drive
- Option Control
- Count the Lies
- Make Me Break Me
- Sonic Candy
- From Skies of Fire
- Killer Me Killer You
- Fivefold
- Break These Walls
- Breakdances with Wolves

== Pointfest 27 ==
Pointfest 27 took place on August 14, 2010, at the Verizon Wireless Amphitheater located in Maryland Heights, Missouri.

Main Stage

- Hurt
- Flyleaf
- Puddle of Mudd
- Stone Sour
- Avenged Sevenfold

U.S. Marines Side Stage

- Sonic Candy
- My Darkest Days
- Red Line Chemistry
- Hail the Villain
- Halestorm
- Cavo
- Sick Puppies

Air Force Side Stage

- LucaBrasi
- Autovein
- Violent Soho
- American Bang
- 10 Years
- Ludo

Pop's Local Stage

- Me Verse You
- Outrageous
- Option Control
- Last Nights Vice
- Opposites Attack
- Killer Me Killer You
- Fer De Lance
- The Gorge
- Parallel 33
- Break These Walls
- Sicfaist

== Pointfest 28 ==
Pointfest 28 was held on Sunday May 15, 2011 at Verizon Wireless Amphitheater in Maryland Heights, MO.

- Korn
- Papa Roach
- Hollywood Undead
- Sevendust
- Finger Eleven
- Sick Puppies
- Alter Bridge
- All That Remains
- 10 Years
- Damned Things
- Drive A (canceled due to tour bus breaking down)
- Breakdances with Wolves
- Greek Fire
- RED
- Jonathan Tyler and the Northern Lights
- Adelitas Way
- Hail the Villain (canceled for medical reasons. Posted on the Facebook page of 105.7 The Point)
- Pop Evil
- Red Line Chemistry
- Last Nights Vice
- Isabella won a battle of the bands to be the opening band for this pointfest
- From Skies of Fire
- Days Taken

== Pointfest 29 ==
Pointfest 29 was held September 10, 2011 at Verizon Wireless Amphitheater. Exit 714 won the final Pop's Local Show "Battle for Pointfest" and was the opening act for Pointfest.

Chevy Main Stage

- Middle Class Rut 5:15
- Cake 6:15
- Chevelle 7:30
- The Urge 8:45
- Bush 10:00

Big St Charles Motorsports White Stage

- Exit 714 11:00
- LucaBrasi 11:50
- Red Line Chemistry 1:00
- Brookroyal 2:10
- Janus 3:20
- 10 Years 4:30

Marines Black Stage

- Last Nights Vice 11:25
- Kyng 12:25
- Shaman's Harvest 1:35
- Greek Fire 2:45
- Hurt 3:55

Pops/Prime Sole Stage

- Something Heroic 11:00
- Gateway Getaway 11:40
- Corvus 12:20
- Saence 1:00
- Deny the Gravity 1:40
- Opposites Attack 2:20
- From Skies of Fire 3:00
- Hollow Point Heroes 3:40
- Fivefold 4:20
- Connibal Road 5:00

== Pointfest 30 ==
Pointfest 30 was on May 19 and 20, 2012, at the Verizon Wireless Amphitheater.

Saturday, May 19

- Rob Zombie
- Megadeth
- 10 Years
- Trapt
- Hurt
- Janus
- Taproot
- Greek Fire
- Shaman's Harvest
- Killer Me Killer You
- Inimical Drive
- Fungonewrong (Battle for Pointfest co-winner)
- Mesoterra
- Iron Fist Dillusion
- Make Me Break Me
- Carthage
- Outcome of Betrayal
- Midnight Hour
- Hollow Point Heroes

Sunday, May 20

- Incubus
- Chevelle
- Cypress Hill
- P.O.D.
- Middle Class Rut
- Awolnation
- Neon Trees
- Foxy Shazam
- Cavo
- Kyng
- Machree
- Ghost in the Machine (Battle for Pointfest co-winner)
- Connibal Road
- Strata G
- 30aut6
- From Skies of Fire
- Lori's Puppets
- Between the Rivers
- Tear Out the Heart

== Pointfest 31 ==
Pointfest was held Sunday, May 12, 2013, at the Verizon Wireless Amphitheater.

- Alice in Chains
- Three Days Grace
- Papa Roach
- Bullet for My Valentine
- Volbeat
- Hollywood Undead
- Sick Puppies
- Halestorm
- P.O.D.
- Stardog Champion
- Bloodnstuff
- City Avenue
- Lye
- Evading Azrael
- River City Sound
- Fivefold
- Love Me Leave Me
- Brokeneck
- Mercury Descends
- Seven Year Nightmare
- Make Me Break Me

== Pointfest 32 ==
This Pointfest was held May 10, 2014 at the Verizon Wireless Amphitheater.

- Queens of the Stone Age
- The Offspring
- AFI
- Blue October
- Neon Trees
- The Head and the Heart
- Crosses (†††)
- Band of Skulls
- The Airborne Toxic Event
- Morning Parade
- The Orwells
- Chelsea Wolfe
- Hollow Point Heroes
- Arythma
- D-Railed
- Peze
- OATM
- Midnight Hour
- Evading Azreal
- Spacetrain
- Facing Infamy
- The Weekend Routine

== Pointfest 33 ==
This Pointfest was held on May 23, 2015, at the Hollywood Casino Amphitheatre.

- Breaking Benjamin
- Seether
- Chevelle
- The Used
- Greek Fire
- Yelawolf
- Meg Myers
- Young Guns
- Shaman's Harvest
- Highly Suspect
- Lori's Puppets
- Nervous Pudding
- Soundtrapp
- Hollow Point Heroes
- Rev Nation (Battle for Pointfest 2015 winner)
- City of Parks

== Pointfest 34 ==
This Pointfest was held on May 21, 2016, at the Hollywood Casino Amphitheatre.

- Deftones
- Coheed and Cambria
- Holy White Hounds
- Story of the Year
- Chevelle
- Highly Suspect
- Flogging Molly
- Bring Me the Horizon
- The Struts
- Sick Puppies
- The Hush List
- City of Parks
- Conquer as They Come
- Disguise the Limit
- OneDay

== Pointfest 35 ==
Pointfest 35 also called Pointfest 2017, was supposed to take place on May 13 and 20, 2017 at Hollywood Casino Amphitheatre. Korn was set to headline the show on May 13, but had to cancel due to doctor-ordered vocal rest for lead singer Jonathan Davis. Breaking Benjamin took over the headlining spot on May 13. The show on May 20 was canceled entirely due to the death of Soundgarden lead singer Chris Cornell on May 18. Soundgarden was to be the headlining act on May 20.

May 13

- Korn (canceled due to doctor-order vocal rest for lead singer Jonathan Davis)
- Breaking Benjamin
- Alter Bridge
- Thrice
- Sick Puppies
- You Me at Six
- Holy White Hounds
- Discrepancies

May 20 this entire date was canceled due to Chris Cornell's death two days before the show

- Soundgarden
- Stone Sour
- Pierce the Veil
- Greek Fire
- J. Roddy Walston and the Business
- Biffy Clyro
- The Dillinger Escape Plan
- The Hush List
- Monster Eats Manhattan

== Pointfest 36 ==
This Pointfest was held on May 12, 2018, at the Hollywood Casino Amphitheatre.

Mid America Chevy Dealers Main Stage

- Alice in Chains
- Shinedown
- Stone Temple Pilots
- The Struts
- Brookroyal

Pointfest Side Stage

- Blue October
- Candlebox
- The Glorious Sons
- Common Jones

Pop's Local Stage

- The Skagbyrds
- Scrub & Ace Ha (Played two sets, back-to-back)
- Stump Water Shine
- Guerrilla Theory
- Silent Hollow

== Pointfest 37 ==
This Pointfest was held on May 25, 2019, at the Hollywood Casino Amphitheatre.

Main Stage

- Seether
- Coheed And Cambria
- Fuel
- Live

Pointfest White Stage

- Filter
- Greek Fire
- The Glorious Sons
- Palaye Royale
- Dirty Honey

Pointfest Black Stage

- P.O.D.
- Andrew W.K.
- Badflower
- Friday Pilots Club
- Bleach

Pop's Local Stage

- After Alberta
- Sixes High
- Man the Helm
- The Scatterguns
- Comoon Jones
- Retro Champ
- For the City
- Facing INfamy
- Smiley Boy

== Pointfest 40 ==
- Incubus
- Coheed & Cambria
- The Pretty Reckless
- Bad Omens
- Badflower
- Greek Fire
- White Reaper
- Band-Maid
- Tiger Cub
