= Lapush =

American rock band

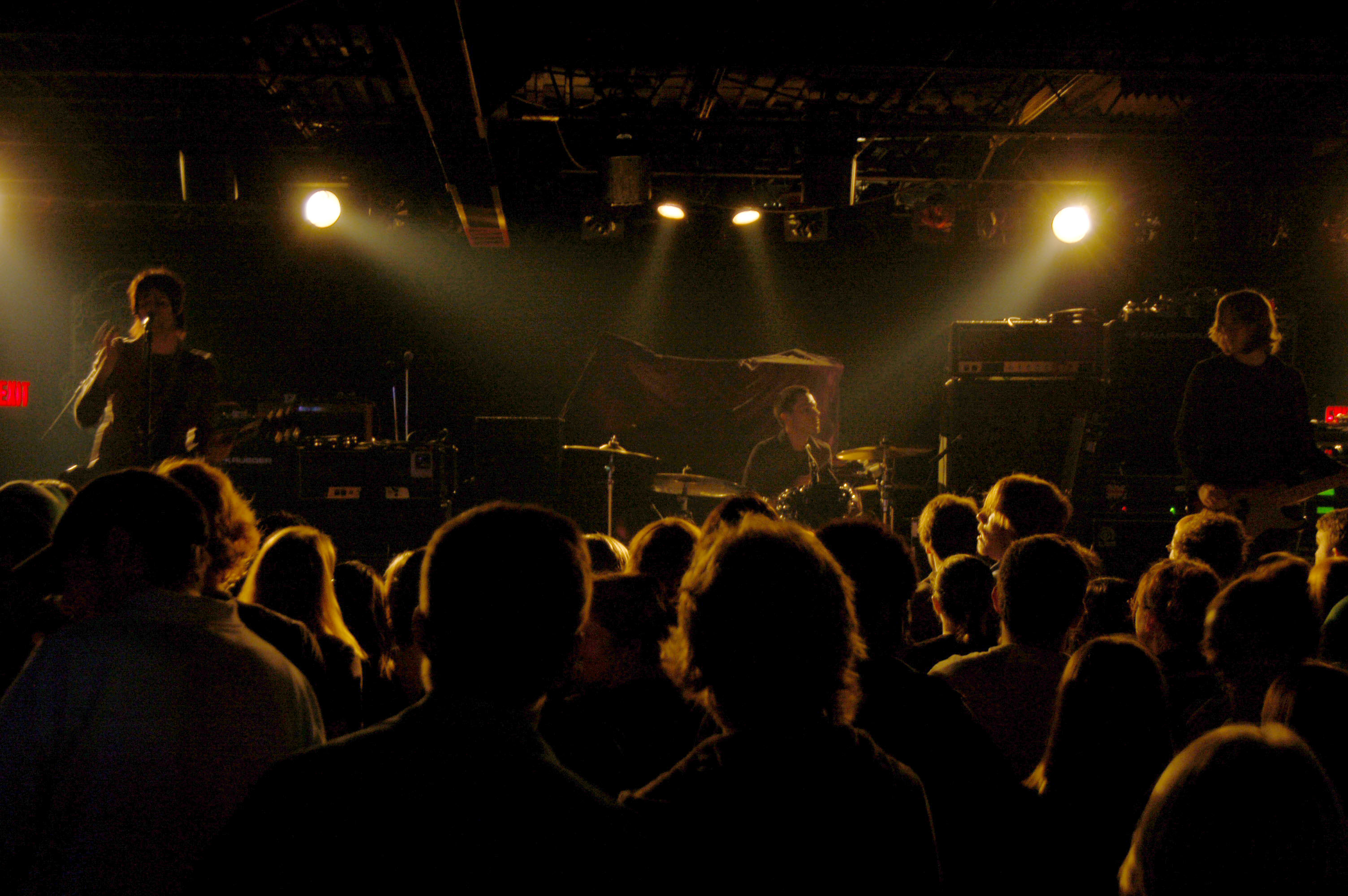
- Lapush performing at Mississippi Nights in St. Louis, MO in 2002.

Background information
- Origin: St. Charles, Missouri, United States
- Genres: Alternative rock, pop, indie
- Years active: 2002–2008
- Labels: 456, Fontana, Universal
- Members: Thom Donovan; Kevin Bachmann; Neil Bardon
- Past members: Brett Voelker; Stephen Donovan; Casey Bazzell
- Website: www.lapush.net

Lapush is an American rock band, formed in 2002 in St. Charles, Missouri.

After releasing several singles and one EP independently, Lapush signed to New York-based label, 456 (Universal Music Group) in 2005. The label is co-owned by Carson Daly and Jonathan Rifkind.

Their music features a melding of American and European influences.

The band's discography consists of two studio albums, one EP and 10 singles. Lapush made their network television debut on Last Call with Carson Daly on NBC (December 2005) performing two songs; Quit You Now and Tout Le Monde. Their debut album, Someplace Closer To Here, reached No. 15 on the Alternative/Specialty Albums Chart. The second single from that record, Aurora, reached No. 15 on the Alternative/Specialty Singles Chart and also appeared in the television show Moonlight on CBS.

== History ==
Lapush formed in St. Charles, Missouri, in 2002 by brothers Thom Donovan and Stephen Donovan. Thom previous played guitar in the band Stir and Stephen played bass in the band Flynova. The original Lapush lineup consisted of: Thom Donovan (guitar and vocals), Stephen Donovan (guitar and vocals), Kevin Bachmann (bass), Casey Bazzell (keyboards and vocals) and Brett Voelker (drums). The band was named after La Push, Washington; a small community in Washington state. The name La Push is an infusion of the French la bouche, meaning "mouth", into Chinook Jargon. It describes the town's location at the mouth of the river. Instead of separating 'La Push', the band would simply combine the two into one word, 'Lapush'.

The band played their first show October 2003 and quickly became a top draw in the local St. Louis music scene. Early shows included a sold-out performance at The Pageant opening for The Urge, as well as sold-out concerts at Mississippi Nights and Creepy Crawl.

Lapush released a self-titled EP in 2004 which sold out of its initial pressing. The band began receiving airplay on KEXP (Seattle), Indie 103.1 (Los Angeles), Q101 (Chicago), 105.7 The Point (St. Louis) as well as XM Satellite Radio. The band toured regionally and developed a following in neighboring college towns including Columbia, MO and Lawrence, KS. During this period, Lapush opened for several national acts including; Matt Nathanson and Nikka Costa.

Unable to commit to the band's touring schedule, Stephen Donovan and Casey Bazzell left the group late 2004. Thom Donovan took over singing full-time and the band carried on as a trio. By early 2005 Lapush signed to 456 (Universal Music Group), a New York-based indie label co-owned by Carson Daly and Jonathan Rifkind.

Someplace Closer To Here (2005)
Lapush began recording Someplace Closer To Here in 2004. The album was produced and mixed by Thom Donovan in the band's rehearsal space using the minimal amount of recording equipment the band owned. The band thought they were simply recording demos. Those "demos" were eventually released as the bands nationally distributed debut album.

Someplace Closer To Here was released on June 5, 2005. The album features 3 singles, Say Something, Quit You Now and Aurora. Aurora would go to No. 15 on the Alternative/Specialty Singles Chart. The album would follow suit on the Alternative/Specialty Albums Chart. The band continued to play across the country; including shows with Hot Hot Heat and The Sounds. Lapush also performed a DJ set at Hiro Ballroom in New York City with Andy Rourke from The Smiths. Thom Donovan performed a DJ set with Kasabian after a sold-out show in St. Louis. In December 2005, Lapush would make their network television debut, performing 2 songs on Last Call with Carson Daly on NBC.

Music from Someplace Closer To Here has appeared in several television shows including, Moonlight (CBS), Laguna Beach (MTV), The Hills (MTV), College Life (MTV), The T.O. Show (VH1) as well as the Clear Pictures indie film, Outpatient.

Someplace Closer To Here was also listed at No. 18 on PlaybackSTL Magazine's Top Albums of 2005.

Press Reviews for Someplace Closer To Here
If Lapush hailed from England, no one would be the least bit surprised at the band's debut, Someplace Closer To Here, which recalls the romanticism of Coldplay, the insistent groove of Oasis, the drama of Radiohead, or the expansive bombast of The Verve. Savvy listeners would nod and smile at the lush production, the eclectic arrangements, and the gauzy vocals and tip their bowlers once more at the cleverness of another handful of talented Brits. The trouble is that Lapush, who sound every bit as good as the bands noted above, did not burst from a posh London studio, but from a basement in St. Louis, MO. — Amplifier Magazine

There's something eternally attractive about the rock trio format — some of rock & roll's finest and most powerful bands have consisted of nothing more than a guy singing and playing guitar with a bass player and drummer alongside him. That's the format used by the St. Louis-based trio Lapush, but if you're expecting something like either the Jam's taut mod-pop attack or Cream's elephantine, bluesy swagger, think again: these guys specialize in a medium-tempo, sometimes rather mopey version of the rock trio approach that puts mood over hooks and doesn't hesitate to add a few quirky electronic keyboards to the mix. Singer Thom Donovan comes across as something kind of like an enervated Bono, letting his voice fall into a croak at times but rarely pushing himself to emotional extremes. As a guitarist he's more interesting than flashy — Tout le Monde features what is probably the best six-note guitar solo ever recorded. Throughout the album there are hints of an extensive 1980s record collection; apart from the Bono influence, there's Quit You Now, which sounds suspiciously like an Echo & the Bunnymen outtake circa 1984. You'll find yourself being quietly enchanted over and over again. Recommended. — Rick Anderson, All Music Guide

Modern Blues (2007)
By late 2006, drummer Brett Voelker left the band and was replaced by Neil Bardon. Modern Blues, the band's second album, was released on May 30, 2007. Brad Booker from Stir recorded drums on Modern Blues prior to Neil Bardon joining the band. Richard Fortus performed cello on the album's closing track, All The Lost Souls; a track Donovan penned after reading Richard Dawkins book, The Ancestor's Tale. The liner notes of Modern Blues includes a dedication to Donovan's father, who died in 2006 from pancreatic cancer. The band's record label, 456 (Universal Music Group), had shut down and Modern Blues was released independently through their own imprint, Lapush Recordings. Music from Modern Blues has appeared in several television shows including, The Hills (MTV), College Life (MTV) and 16 And Pregnant (MTV). In the Fall of 2008, Lapush played to their biggest hometown crowd; performing at Verizon Wireless Amphitheater in front of 22,000 people for Pointfest.

Press Review for Modern Blues
The title of the trio's latest EP doesn't refer to the musical genre, but the feeling of loss, heartbreak and bereavement. This can lead bands to write dreary, sad-sack mopers—or, in the case of Lapush, turn the hurt into something grand and uplifting. Singer and guitarist Thom Donovan wrote the album-opening Closer after the death of his father, and it's as good of a send-off as anyone could want: The spacey guitar atmospherics and the alternately sad and hopeful lyrics are enough to bring a tear to the eye of the hard-hearted cynic. — Riverfront Times

Aurora - Digital Single (2008)
The band released an acoustic version of Aurora on March 12, 2008, on iTunes.

Hiatus
The band's last performance was in March 2008 at The Duck Room in St. Louis, Missouri.

In July 2008, Thom Donovan performed a solo acoustic set; opening for OneRepublic in St. Louis, Missouri. Donovan's first solo album, Cast a Light, was released on March 30, 2010. The album release was kicked off by a pair of shows at SXSW in Austin, TX March 2010. Songs from the album were featured in the series finale of The Hills on MTV. September Glows, the final track from Cast A Light, received airplay on KROQ-FM in Los Angeles. Donovan released his second solo album, "Mercury Maybe", in March 2012. His third solo album, "Canon", was released June 16, 2014. The first single, Shipwreck, features a collaboration with Wyclef Jean and Ruby Amanfu. He also has a small role in the ABC musical drama series, Nashville, as the keyboardist in Avery Barkley's band. In 2012 Donovan formed Nashville-based duo, Rossi, with Kendall Morgan.

Kevin Bachmann has released two studio albums with Troubadour Dali.

== Band members ==
Members

- Thom Donovan - vocals, guitar, keyboards (2002–2008)
- Kevin Bachmann - bass (2002–2008)
- Neil Bardon - drums (2007–2008)

Former members

- Brett Voelker - drums (2002–2006)
- Stephen Donovan - vocals, guitar (2002–2004)
- Casey Bazzell - vocals, keyboards (2002–2004)

== Discography ==
=== Albums ===
Release date	Album	Label	Format
30 May 2007	Modern Blues	Lapush Recordings	CD, digital download
7 June 2005	Someplace Closer To Here	456, Fontana Distribution, Universal Music Group	CD, digital download

=== EP ===
Release date	Album	Label	Format
4 March 2003	An EP By Lapush	Lapush Recordings	CD

=== Singles ===
Year	Single	Label	Format
2009	Lucky One (Remixed & Remastered)	456, Fontana Distribution, Universal Music Group	CD, digital download
2009	Hideaway	456, Fontana Distribution, Universal Music Group	CD, digital download
2008	Closer (Remixed & Remastered)	Lapush Recordings	digital download
2008	Aurora (Acoustic)	Lapush Recordings	digital download
2008	Leave The Light On	Lapush Recordings	digital download
2007	Run	Lapush Recordings	CD, digital download
2007	Closer	Lapush Recordings	CD, digital download
2006	Quit You Now	456, Fontana Distribution, Universal Music Group	CD, digital download
2005	Aurora	456, Fontana Distribution, Universal Music Group	CD, digital download
2005	Say Something	456, Fontana Distribution, Universal Music Group	CD, digital download
2003	Through It All	Lapush Recordings	CD, digital download
2002	Quit You Now (demo)	Lapush Recordings	CD, digital download
