= Modern Day Zero =

- Also known as: MDZ
- Origin: St. Louis, U.S.
- Genres: Hard rock, post-grunge
- Years active: 1995–2007, 2017–2018
- Label: Bullet 339
- Members: Scott Gertken; Scott "Rock" Davis; Rich Criebaum; Brian Pearia; Matt Arana
- Past members: Zach Broderick; Andrew "Goony" Brown; Jimmy "Angel" Johansen; Blake Nelson
- Website: MySpace

Modern Day Zero is a hard rock band based in St. Louis, Missouri. Formerly called Mesh—changed to Mesh STL after the name-conflict with Mesh—the band renamed and restarted as Modern Day Zero. Their single, "Sick Inside," from their first album, Coming Up for Air, spent eight weeks as the most-requested song on St. Louis-area alternative rock radio station KPNT. Modern Day Zero has had songs included in the video games NHL 2004 and NASCAR Thunder 2004 and has toured with bands such as Puddle of Mudd, Nickelback, Velvet Revolver, Hoobastank, and Guns N' Roses.

== History ==
=== Mesh (1995-2001) ===
In June 1995, Brian Pearia and Rich Criebaum of the Saint Charles, Missouri-based band Ten Stories Tall were in search of a new lead singer after losing theirs. They approached Scott Gertken while he was singing and playing rhythm guitar for a Foristell, Missouri-based band called Trailer. Gertken first declined the position, but when Trailer disbanded a few months later he joined up Pearia, Criebaum, and Pat Ryan. The group considered calling themselves Zero Hour before settling on Mesh instead. The band began playing shows at local bars and clubs with sets composed popular radio hits and some of their original music, and they released a self-titled four-track EP in 1997. By 1998, they had enough of their own material to play all-original shows. In 1998, lead guitarist Pat Ryan left the band and was replaced by Scott Davis. Mesh traveled to Memphis, Tennessee, in 1998 and entered the studio in with producer Malcolm Springer to record their second EP. Springer had previously worked with other similar rock acts such as Greenwheel, Matchbox 20, and Collective Soul. Mesh played a CD release party show for Ripple Effect on May 22, 1999, at Rotary Park in Wentzville, Missouri, and then followed up the following day with the opening performance on the main stage at Pointfest 11. Ripple Effect spawned Mesh's first radio hit "Clear Day" and the EP went on to sell more than 10,000 copies.

In 2000, Mesh added additional guitarist Matt Arana to complete the group. Mesh had moved from being a cover band that played around St. Charles to become a popular regional group. Mesh's fan base in St. Louis expected big things from the power rock group as they were on the verge of signing with Capitol Records in 2000. The band and the label had agreed to terms, and the contract was all but signed, but then the deal took a turn for the worse when the incoming president, Andy Slater, took over the label. At that point, talks quieted as Slater shifted the label's focus to other priorities. The band members eventually realized that they had no choice but to go on without Capitol, and in May 2001 Mesh self-released what would have been their full-length major-label debut. The album was titled Lowercase as a reference to its release independent from Capitol Records. The first single, "Maybe Tomorrow," earned significant airplay on KPNT in St. Louis.

=== Mesh STL (2001-2003) ===
The regional success of "Maybe Tomorrow" and the strength of their live show quickly attracted the attention of other record labels, and Mesh was picked up by The Label, which was new record company managed and operated by The Firm management group. "Maybe Tomorrow" hit rock radio airwaves nationwide on August 14, 2001, and then the group filmed the music video for the single inside the abandoned Herald Examiner building in Los Angeles. The video quickly became a staple on MTV2. Mesh announced a name change to Mesh STL in mid-October because of a conflict with the British synth-pop band of the same name. Lowercase was remixed by Tom Lord-Alge and repackaged for its major-label release on November 20, 2001, and Mesh STL embarked on a rigorous tour schedule alongside Puddle of Mudd. "Maybe Tomorrow" went on to rise to the Top 20 of both the Modern Rock and Active Rock format charts. "Believe Me" was released in the spring of 2002 as the second single from Lowercase, and the group continued touring in 2002 with other successful acts including Tantric. "Believe Me" experienced minor chart success in the US, peaking at #39 on the Billboard Hot Mainstream Rock Tracks chart.

In summer 2002, Mesh STL entered the studio once again with producer Malcolm Springer to begin recording demos for a new album. Among the new tracks recorded was "Down", which made its way onto the soundtracks for EA Sports NHL 2004 and NASCAR Thunder 2004 video games. The track was the first heard live as early as spring 2002, and it was the first heard of the recordings for the band's second full-length album. The Firm's record label closed shop in 2003, leaving Mesh once again without major-label support. The band continued recording and members of the band formed their own record label, Bullet 339 Records. The band announced that the title of the upcoming album would be Coming Up For Air. Lead singer Scott Gertken explained the title of the forthcoming record, "We've been suffocated by the industry. It's in such a bad state right now. But we feel a breath of fresh air doing this ourselves and being excited about it. So instead of suffocating, we're coming up for air."

Late that year, Mesh STL announced their farewell show would take place on December 13 at The Pageant in St. Louis. Although the band's second album had been recorded, it would not be released under the Mesh STL name except for the track "Down," which was released on a limited edition EP shortly before the band ceased to exist.

=== Modern Day Zero (2004-2007) ===
The band was reborn in 2004 as Modern Day Zero, meaning starting all over again. "Every day begins anew and you start from zero," according to guitarist Rock Davis. Modern Day Zero, commonly referred to as MDZ, adapted the still unreleased material recorded for the second Mesh STL along with new material for their debut release Coming Up For Air, which hit stores in June 2004. The album, recorded in the band's own recording studio, was released under their own record label. With their new, more aggressive sound, the first single, "Sick Inside," was quick to earn airplay throughout the Midwest and became the most requested song at modern rock station KPNT in St. Louis for 8 weeks and a top requested song at several other stations nationwide including WGIR in Manchester, New Hampshire. In 2004 guitarist Matt Arana decided to leave because of his personal circumstances, and he was replaced by Zach Broderick.

Following the release of Coming Up For Air, the band hit the road again opening for bands such as Breaking Benjamin, Collective Soul, Puddle of Mudd, Shinedown in 2005. In May 2005, MDZ announced they would be opening for Velvet Revolver and Hoobastank on the 2nd leg of the Electric Wonderland tour. "Broken" was released to radio in June 2005 as the second single off Coming Up For Air. In July 2006, long time drummer Brian Pearia left the band for personal reasons. During that summer, John Pessoni of The Urge filled in on drums for live shows. Later in 2005, the band's own record label released the Midwest Music Explosion: St. Louis Vol. 1 compilation, which featured other up and coming Midwestern rock acts and featured the new MDZ single "Show Me." Andrew "Goony" Brown was officially announced as the new drummer for MDZ in late 2005.

In January 2006, MDZ announced that they were selected by Airwalk and Revolver Magazine as the Unsigned Hero 2006 recipient, which earned them Airwalk, Randall Amps, and Washburn Guitar endorsement deals along with the opening slot for Disturbed at the House of Blues in Anaheim, CA on January 20, 2006. In early 2006, the band entered their studio to begin work on a new album, and they began giving fans a preview of the new tracks at live shows. One of the new tracks, "Spit You Out", was selected to be in the movie Lycan, and MDZ filmed a music video for the single on November 1, 2006. MDZ closed out 2006 by opening several shows for Guns N' Roses.

On May 15, 2007, Modern Day Zero released its second studio album entitled The Wait featuring the first single "Spit You Out." Thom & Jeff of 105.7 The Point began playing "Superhuman" which quickly became a top requested song and turned into the new single.

In November 2007, Modern Day Zero posted a blog on their MySpace page that said the band was going to be taking an extended, indefinite break so that everyone can focus on the other aspects of life. In addition, they said they are not disbanding, only taking a break. November also marked the release of "In Our Lives", a DVD showing a glimpse into the lives of MDZ, available only via their website.

Modern Day Zero played their final show together on December 20, 2007, at Ameristar Casino's Bottleneck Blues Bar in St. Charles, Missouri.

=== Post-Break (2008-2011) ===
Gerkten is focusing on his band management company, TVR Management. Criebaum is the lead engineer/producer at Trailer Studios in Foristell, MO. Davis is a guitar tech for Guns 'N' Roses lead and rhythm guitarist and background vocalist Richard Fortus. After initially joining Royal, a local band in his hometown of Chicago, IL, in September 2008 Broderick was announced as the new guitarist for the hard-rock band Nonpoint, replacing former guitarist Andy Goldman. Nelson is playing in various local cover bands.

=== Reunion (2017-2018) ===
On August 16, 2017, the band announced that a reunion show was scheduled for September 23, 2017, at Delmar Hall in Saint Louis. The band also announced that Brian Pearia and Matt Arana had returned to the band, returning the band to its lineup from 2000 to 2004. MDZ also played the Mississippi Nights Reunion Show at Delmar Hall on March 29, 2018, alongside a number of other Saint Louis area bands including The Urge. On September 3, 2018, the band played in the 3rd annual Wayback Pointfest at Hollywood Casino Amphitheatre (Maryland Heights, Missouri). The one day festival was headlined by 311 and The Offspring. Modern Day Zero played on the side stage earlier in the afternoon. Since this concert, the band has been on hiatus.

== Discography ==
=== Albums ===
- Mesh EP (Mesh, 1997)
- Ripple Effect (Mesh, 1998)
- Lowercase (Mesh, May 2001 and re-released as mesh StL on Jive, November 2001)
- Down EP (mesh StL, October 2003)
- Coming Up For Air (Modern Day Zero, June 2004)
- The Wait (Modern Day Zero, May 2007)

=== Compilations ===
- Point Essential 5 featuring "For All The People"
- Point Platinum 1 featuring "For All The People"
- Point Essential 6 featuring "Clear Day"
- The Addiction 5 featuring "Sick Inside"
- Midwest Music Explosion: St. Louis Volume 1 featuring "Show Me"
- Werewolf: The Devil's Hound - Original Motion Picture Soundtrack featuring "Spit You Out"

=== Singles ===
| Year | Title | Peak Chart Position | Album |
| Year | Title | US Hot Mainstream Rock Tracks | Album |
|---|---|---|---|
| 1999 | "Clear Day" | - | Ripple Effect |
| 2001 | "Maybe Tomorrow" | 26 | Lowercase |
| 2002 | "Believe Me" | 39 | Lowercase |
| 2003 | "Down" | - | Down EP |
| 2004 | "Sick Inside" | - | Coming Up for Air |
| 2005 | "Broken" | - | Coming Up for Air |
| 2007 | "Spit You Out" | - | The Wait |
| 2007 | "Superhuman" | - | The Wait |
