= Rockfest =

Outdoor music festival in Kansas City, US (1992–2018)

- Genre: Hard rock; heavy metal
- Locations: Kansas City, United States
- Years active: 1992–2018

Rockfest was an outdoor, hard rock and metal music festival held annually by Kansas City radio station KQRC-FM 98.9 The Rock since 1992. Over the years, the festival was held at various venues around the city, including Liberty Memorial Park, Kansas Speedway, and Sandstone Amphitheater. As of 2010, it was considered North America's largest one-day music festival. Major bands such as Godsmack, Staind, Seether, Stone Temple Pilots, Korn, Alice in Chains, Rob Zombie, and Disturbed have all headlined Rockfest. The large size and rain-or-shine ethos of the concert led to community disputes regarding its continuation.

In 2017, Rockfest was held at Kansas Speedway instead of Liberty Memorial Park due to inclement weather in previous years, making the original venue unsuitable.

In 2019, it was announced that Rockfest would be postponed until 2020. No official announcement was made regarding the postponement aside from a brief spot on the radio station and on Facebook, confusing many and giving rise to rumors. The primary reason cited by organizers was that the costs for big-name bands was too high.

A statement was made on February 13, 2020, announcing there would not be a Rockfest that year. There were no subsequent events, making 2018 the final year for the festival.

== Event lineup ==
Date	Lineup
May 30, 2009	Korn, Buckcherry, Shinedown, Corey Taylor, Theory of a Deadman, Saving Abel, Rev Theory, Drowning Pool, Loaded, Dope, The Parlor Mob, Burn Halo, The Veer Union, Crooked X, The Federation of Horsepower
May 15, 2010	Godsmack, Three Days Grace, Papa Roach, Seether, Drowning Pool, Rev Theory, Halestorm, Five Finger Death Punch, Airbourne, Janus, The Veer Union, Burn Halo, Adelitas Way, Shaman's Harvest, Taddy Porter
May 14, 2011	Disturbed, Stone Sour, Papa Roach, Alter Bridge, Sevendust, Hinder, Halestorm, Black Label Society, All That Remains, 10 Years, Crossfade, Red Line Chemistry, Art of Dying, New Medicine, Evelyn Awake
May 12, 2012	Shinedown, Five Finger Death Punch, Trivium, Theory of a Deadman, Slash, Hell Yeah, Volbeat, Chevelle
May 11, 2013	Alice in Chains, All That Remains, Killswitch Engage, In This Moment, Sevendust, Papa Roach, Seether, Volbeat, Halestorm, Eye Empire, Young Guns, Aranda, Device, Red Line Chemistry
May 31, 2014	Korn, Five Finger Death Punch, Staind, Killswitch Engage, Steel Panther, Black Label Society, Pop Evil, Adelitas Way, Escape the Fate, Soil, The Pretty Reckless, Heaven's Basement, Eve to Adam, Nothing More
May 30, 2015	Rob Zombie, Anthrax, Volbeat, In This Moment, Papa Roach, Nothing More, Tech N9ne, Halestorm, Otherwise, All That Remains, Crobot, We Are Harlot, Motionless in White, Sidewise
May 14, 2016	Disturbed, Seether, Hell Yeah, Sixx A.M., Ghost, Jackyl, Trivium, Sevendust, Drowning Pool, Escape the Fate, Pop Evil, Saint Asonia, Red Sun Rising, Like a Storm, The Veer Union
June 3, 2017	Godsmack, the Circle, Volbeat, Halestorm, Ratt, Collective Soul, Buckcherry, P.O.D., Zakk Sabbath, Tom Keifer, Blackberry Smoke, Crobot, Candlebox, Sidewise, One Less Reason, Watching the Fall
June 2, 2018	Five Finger Death Punch, Ghost, Stone Temple Pilots, Vince Neil, Sevendust, Underoath, I Prevail, Of Mice & Men, Red Sun Rising, 10 Years, Butcher Babies, Miss May I, Powerman 5000, Bad Wolves, Shaman's Harvest, Hyborian
