= Revolution One =

American alternative rock band

- Origin: St. Louis, Missouri, United States
- Genres: Alternative rock
- Label: unsigned
- Members: Bryan Roach (vocals); Zack Alexopulos (guitar); Brandon Armstrong (bass); Andy Herrin (drums)
- Past members: Chris Capaletti (guitar); Ben Miller (drums); Matt Fine (drums); Jesse Fine
- Website: http://www.therevolutionone.com/

Revolution One is an American alternative rock band formed in St. Louis, Missouri, United States.

== History ==
=== The Adored/For the World (2003–2007) ===
Following the breakup of his previous band, Flynova, Bryan Roach continued writing music and working on songs with Memphis producer Skidd Mills, who offered a production deal. While recording early demos, Roach played all the instruments except for drums. Roach settled on The Adored for a band name, and he started performing around the St. Louis area with fill-in musicians, occasionally including members of Greenwheel. Permanent band members were eventually selected, including drummer Matt Fine and bassist Jesse Fine, followed by guitarist Tedd Foxx. The band continued writing songs, and in 2004 they showcased at the Double Door in Chicago, where the band caught the attention of a Columbia Records rep. The Adored signed a major-label deal with Columbia Records in fall 2004.

The Adored entered the studio early in 2005 to begin work on their major-label debut with producer Garth Richardson. Around the same time they also adopted the name "For the World" to avoid confusion with L.A.-based power pop band The Adored. For the World finished recording their debut full-length album with Garth Richardson, and it was later mixed by Adam Kasper. For the World toured with The Juliana Theory. KPNT began spinning "Bullet in an Angel", and the band landed a slot playing the Pointfest music festival in St. Louis. After touring for over a year as For the World, Columbia Records recommended another name change.

=== Autovein (2007-2011) ===
In mid-2006, The Adored changed their name once again to Autovein. Soon after the final name change and in the midst of preparing for the release of their major label debut, the band found themselves without their record deal and fighting for the right to release the album. Throughout this period, they continued to tour in support of the new material. In November 2006, Autovein joined Fall Out Boy and Coheed and Cambria for KPNT's annual Christmas show.

After being dropped from Columbia Records, Autovein came across Denver-based Outlook Music who signed Autovein late in 2006. Their debut album Bullets and Bruises was finally released in March 2007. "Save Me" was announced as the first single from the new album. In addition, "Bullet in an Angel" was featured on the Midwest Music Explosion Vol. 2 compilation CD. Autovein spent Spring 2007 touring in support of the new album opening for Smile Empty Soul and The Exies

Following the release of their debut album, Autovein made a couple changes to their lineup. Bassist Zack Alexopulos moved to guitarist when Chris Capaletti left the band. Brandon Armstrong, formerly of Greenwheel joined Autovein as the new bassist. Ben Miller was replaced by Andy Herrin, of One Lone Car, on drums in November 2009.

Autovein self-released their second album, Souvenirs, in November 2009. They pulled it from stores just a few months later to begin working on a proper release, but that deal never materialized.

In summer 2010, Autovein performed at both of KPNT's Pointfest music festivals in St.Louis. The band announced on stage that they had recently recorded a brand new album that will be released in January 2011.

On August 24, Autovein joined Filter for a free Q101 show in Chicago at 115 Bourbon Street.

In January and February 2011, four of the band's new tracks were featured on the MTV shows World of Jenks, Teen Mom 2, and Jersey Shore.

=== Revolution One (2011-present) ===
In February 2011, Autovein announced yet another name change. The band would now be known as Revolution One. Following the name change, the band unveiled a new video for "Suicides & Lullabies". On April 20, 2011 Revolution One joined Biffy Clyro for a show at The Double Door in Chicago.

Revolution One released the Lay Down Our Lives EP on May 3, 2011. 2011.

In July 2012, drummer Andy Herrin, joined the band Cavo.

== Discography ==
=== Albums ===
Title	Type	Label	Release date
The Adored	full-length CD	Ephin Music	2003
Bullets and Bruises	full-length CD	Outlook Music	March 2007
Souvenirs	full-length CD	self-released	November 2009
Lay Down Our Lives	EP	self-released	May 3, 2011

=== Singles ===
- "Save Me" (2007)
- "Bullet in an Angel" (2007)
