= Last Nights Vice =

Last Night's Vice
- Also known as: LNV, Last Night's Vice
- Origin: St. Louis, Missouri, US
- Genres: Pop rock, alternative rock, dance-rock
- Years active: 2005–present
- Members: Brandon House; Jason Hackett; Andrew Ghiassi; Chris Blake; Jordan Phoenix

Last Night's Vice is a five-piece pop rock band from St. Louis, Missouri. After forming in 2006, the group self-released their debut EP called The Power Cosmic EP. Locally, some of their milestones would include playing at both Pointfest 27 and Pointfest 28 as well as the 2011 Fair Saint Louis. Nationally, Last Night's Vice has played at a number of iconic venues from The Cubby Bear in Chicago, Illinois and The Viper Room in Los Angeles, California.

Last Night's Vice is known for their do-it-yourself mentality, taking charge of their own recordings, websites, videos, promotions and show-bookings. Their most recent music video for "Dance While You Still Have Time", filmed and edited by Jordan Phoenix(Guitarist) and Dave Moore, showcases their guerrilla promotional efforts.

Last Night's Vice is currently touring and promoting the release of their full-length album titled Perfect Little Noise.

== History ==
Last Night's Vice is a culmination of two defunct St. Louis bands. Joe and Chris were original members of the band Blame Gary, while Andrew and Jordan had joined later. Blame Gary disbanded after a traveling back from a tough show in Topeka, KS.

Brandon was then the guitarist for the band Duke 45 and singer for Richboy Falling. Andrew had recorded demos for Brandon and recruited him for Last Night's Vice.

=== The Power Cosmic EP (2008) ===
The Power Cosmic EP was Last Night's Vice's first release. It was a 6-song EP with 2 additional songs that were available for download only from sites such as iTunes and Amazon. The album name and title track were inspired by the Silver Surfer comic book character.

=== Perfect Little Noise (2010) ===
The guys released their first full-length album produced by Andrew Ghiassi(Drummer) in summer 2010 at their concert sponsored by 105.7 the Point. They wrapped on their first music video spring 2010, filmed and edited by Anthony Meadows and Scott Hutcherson, for their single Lock and Key. They received mostly positive reviews from multiple music publications.

=== The End Is Near (2014) ===
This album was the first album released after Last Nights Vice separated with Joe, Blake and Jordan. It was released digital only in 2014 and was accompanied with a few one of shows since its release.

== Musical classification ==
Last Night's Vice is considered to be a Pop-Rock band with a dance sound. They can borrow heavily from funk and metal as well and their songs are usually fast and energetic.

Last Night's Vice's influences include all sorts of bands such as Tower of Power, Blink-182, The Temptations and Pantera.

== Members ==
- Brandon House – Vocals
- Jason Hackett – Guitar
- Andrew Ghiassi – Drums

== Former members ==
- Joe Fitzsimmons- Guitar
- Chris Blake – Bass guitar
- Jordan Phoenix – Guitar

== Discography ==
=== Albums ===
| Date of US Release | Title | Label |
|---|---|---|
| September 16, 2008 | The Power Cosmic EP | Self-Released |
| August 31, 2010 | Perfect Little Noise | Self-Released |
