= KPNT =

Coordinates: 38.2195°N 90.5957°W

- Collinsville, Illinois; United States
- Broadcast area: Greater St. Louis
- Frequency: 105.7 MHz (HD Radio)
- Branding: 105-7 The Point

Programming
- Format: Active rock, Modern rock
- Subchannels: HD2: Sports radio

Ownership
- Owner: Hubbard Broadcasting; (St. Louis FCC License Sub, LLC)
- Sister stations: KSHE, WARH, WIL-FM, WXOS

History
- First air date: March 1967 (as KSGM-FM)
- Former call signs: KSGM-FM (1967–1987); KSTZ (1987–1991); KFXB (1991–1993)
- Call sign meaning: "Point"

Technical information
- Facility ID: 56525
- Class: C1
- ERP: 54,000 watts
- HAAT: 254.4 meters (835 ft)

Links
- Webcast: Listen Live; Listen Live (HD2 and HD3)
- Website: 1057thepoint.com tmastl.com (HD2)

KPNT (105.7 FM, "105-7 The Point") is a commercial radio station licensed to Collinsville, Illinois, and broadcasting to Greater St. Louis. It mainly airs a modern rock radio format, with some elements of active rock. It is owned by Hubbard Broadcasting.

KPNT has studios and offices in Creve Coeur (with a St. Louis address). The transmitter is off Mackenzie Road in Shrewsbury, MO, just outside the St. Louis city limits, on a tower used by numerous local TV and FM stations. KPNT broadcasts in HD, and similar to their primary channel, KPNT's HD2 sub-channel feature a replay of sports radio "The Morning After STL".

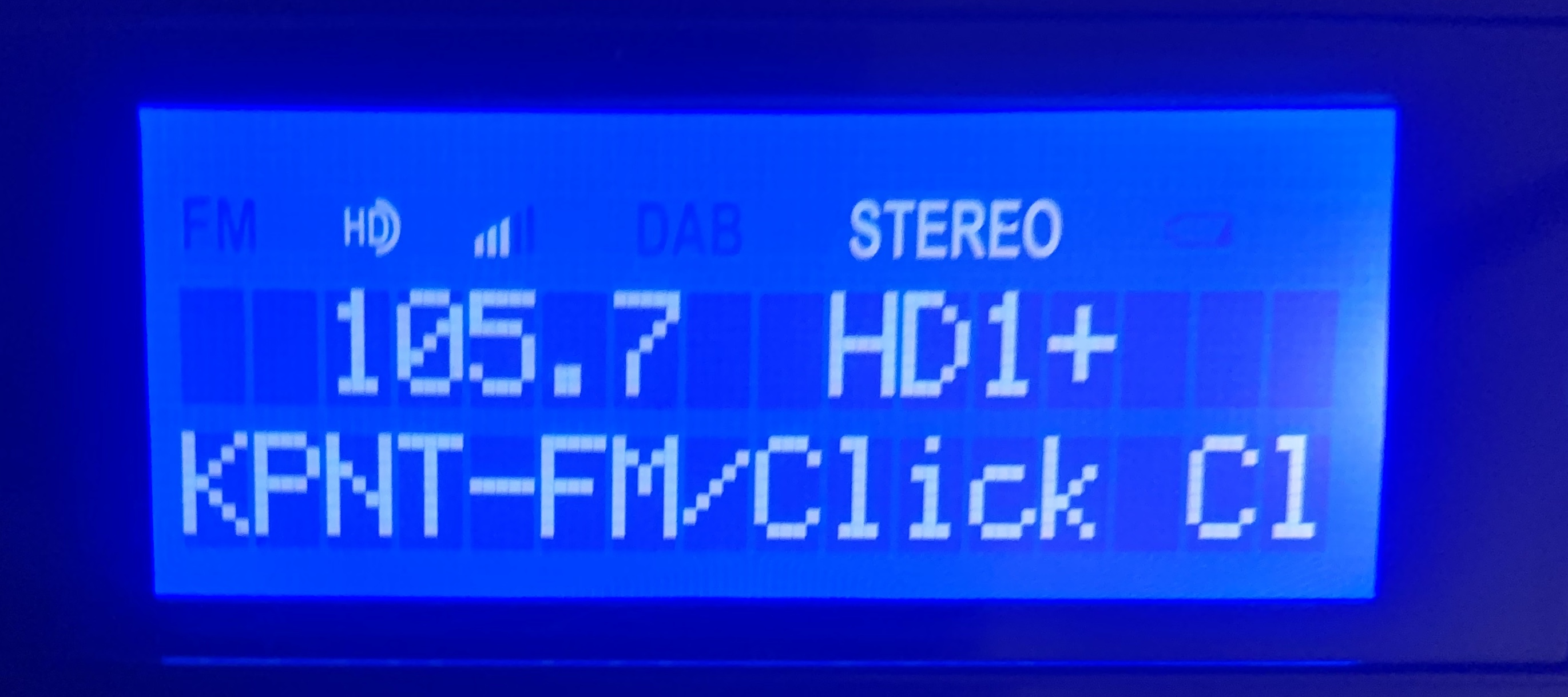

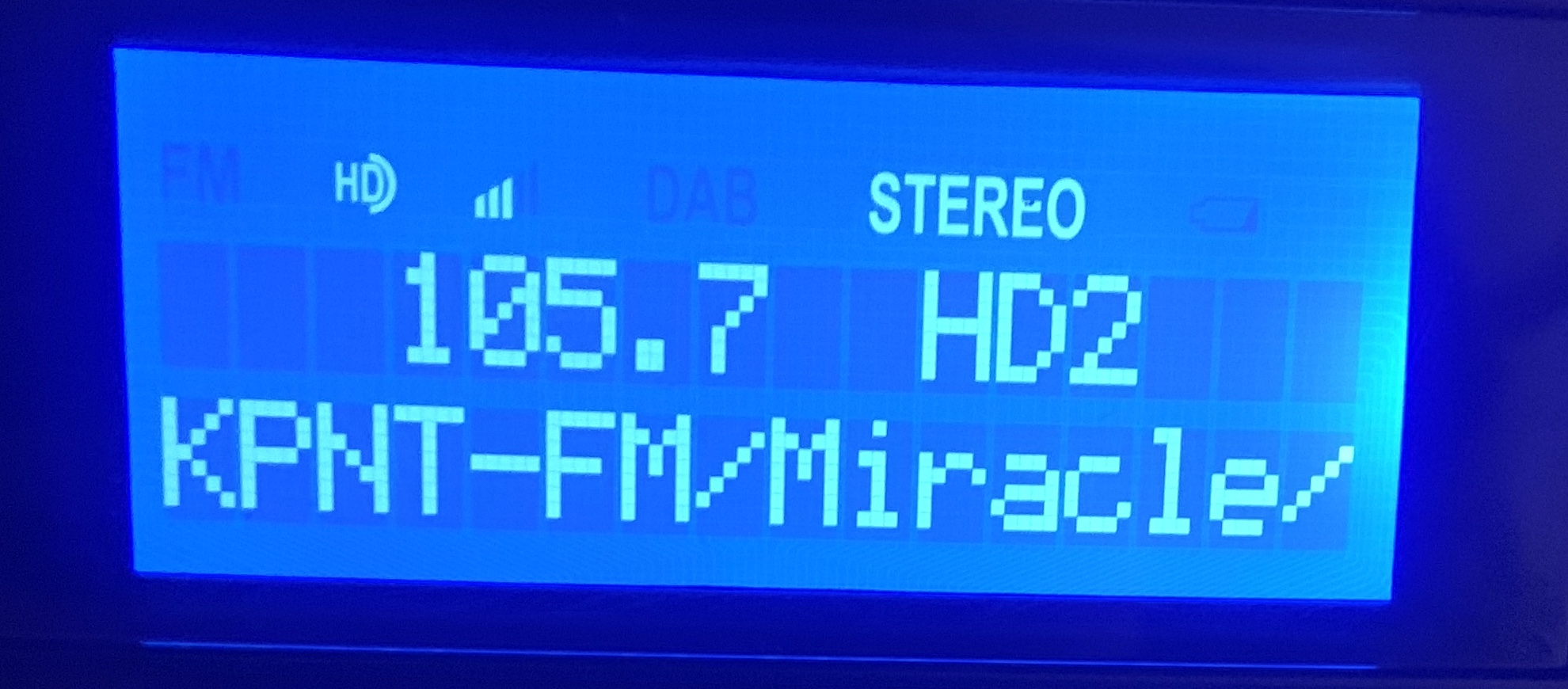
KPNT broadcasting in HD including all the subchannels.

== History ==
KPNT is considered a "move-in" station. In March 1967, the station signed on in Ste. Genevieve, Missouri, about 50 miles south of St. Louis. It had the call sign KSGM-FM and was simulcast with its sister station, KSGM (AM 980); the call letters were derived from the stations' city of license. (KSGM has since moved across the Mississippi River to Chester, Illinois.) KSGM-FM broadcast at 27,000 watts from a 285-foot antenna, with only limited coverage of the southern part of the St. Louis radio market.

In 1987, KSGM-FM was bought by Channel One Communications for $7.5 million. The power was boosted to 100,000 watts, giving the station coverage of the St. Louis metropolitan area. Channel One launched a hot adult contemporary music format with the new call letters, KSTZ, and was known as "Kissed FM" and by mid 1990 briefly as CHR "Kiss FM".

On March 6, 1991, KSTZ was rebranded as "The Fox" with an album-oriented rock (AOR) format and new set of call letters, KFXB. KFXB began a simulcast on sister station WFXB (now WXOS) on 101.1 FM.

The simulcast was broken in February 1993; following several days of stunting with various sound effects and television show theme songs, on February 17, the station adopted the current call sign, KPNT, and flipped to modern rock, partially inspired by the success of St. Louis' first full-time alternative rock station KYMC, a small non-profit station broadcasting out of Ballwin, Missouri. The first song on "105.7 The Point" was "Radio Song" by R.E.M.

In 2000, KPNT was purchased by Emmis Communications, which owned rival rock station WXTM. Emmis changed the format of WXTM and shifted many of its staff to KPNT including The Howard Stern Show, program director Tommy Mattern, and afternoon DJ Jeff "Woody" Fife. Many longtime KPNT staff members were dismissed. The station also shifted to a harder rock sound.

Following Howard Stern's departure from terrestrial radio at the end of 2005, the station began airing the syndicated Rover's Morning Glory. The show never caught on and was dropped in January 2007.

In 2006, KPNT expanded the playlist to include a wider variety of active rock artists while maintaining a strong emphasis on alternative artists. The new slogan, "Everything Alternative", was adopted to promote this change.

In January 2013, KPNT moved its city of license from Ste. Genevieve, Missouri, to Collinsville, Illinois, and its transmitter moved north from Jefferson County, Missouri, to St. Louis. The license for this change was issued by the Federal Communications Commission (FCC) on February 27, 2015. The station was required to reduce its effective radiated power from 100,000 watts to 54,000 watts and height above average terrain from more than 1,300 feet to 835 feet, but the trade was considered beneficial to KPNT by moving its transmitter within the immediate St. Louis metropolitan area, now using a TV and FM tower off Mackenzie Road.

In 2014, the station launched "The Rizzuto Show" as their morning program. The show runs from 6:07 to 9:33am followed by commercials until 10am. The show has won numerous awards and has earned strong ratings. The personalities are host Scott Rizzuto, musician Moon Valjean of Greek Fire/Goldfinger, Lern (formerly at KSHE), comedian Rafe Williams, and King Scott. Co-host Jeff Burton died in August 2022. In January 2023, producer/co-host Tony Patrico was fired for inappropriate conduct.

In November 2025, the station dismissed afternoon host Liv Maddix in a cost-saving move. She was replaced by the syndicated The Woody Show, which airs on tape delay from KYSR in Los Angeles. The Woody Show previously aired on rival station KTLK-FM, until a format change in 2020 due to low ratings.

== Concerts and events ==
KPNT is also well known for promoting an annual music festival known as Pointfest. In recent years, the station has added a Throwback Pointfest.

== Compilation albums ==
KPNT produced a series of compilation albums, featuring tracks submitted by local up and coming artists from throughout the St. Louis metropolitan area. This series of albums is known as Pointessential (stylized as POINTESSENTIAL). Bands featured in the Pointessential series before they became well known have included Gravity Kills, The Urge, Stir, Modern Day Zero, Cavo, Die Symphony, and Autovein. The CD series was an annual release from 1994 through 1999. After KPNT was sold to Emmis Communications, the series was temporarily suspended. It was brought back again in 2002 after a three-year break when the station renewed its commitment to the local music scene in St. Louis.

- Pointessential, Volume 1 (1994)
- Pointessential, Volume 2 (1995)
- Pointessential, Volume 3 (1996)
- Pointessential, Volume 4 (1997)
- Pointessential, Volume 5 (1998)
- The Point Platinum, Version 1.0 (1998)
- Pointessential, Volume 6 (1999)
- Pointessential, Volume 7 (2002)

=== Former slogans for KPNT ===
- "105-7 The Point, Get It" 1993-1999
- "St. Louis' New Rock Alternative, 105-7 The Point" 1999-2006
- "105-7 The Point, "Everything Alternative" 2006–2018
- "105-7 The Point, "St Louis' Rock Alternative" 2018–Present

== Hoax ==
In May 1995, KPNT reported that R.E.M. drummer Bill Berry had died, reportedly receiving the information from Warner Music Group via fax. It was later revealed to be a hoax. Berry had recently undergone an operation to relieve an aneurysm he suffered during the band's tour in support of Monster.
