= Soma Holiday (Greenwheel album) =

Studio album by Greenwheel
- Released: June 25, 2002
- Recorded: House of Blues, Memphis, Tennessee; Sound Stage, The Groove Room, Javalina, The Rock Studios, Nashville, Tennessee
- Genres: Alternative rock Alternative metal
- Length: 42:31
- Label: Island (USA)
- Producer: Malcolm Springer

Professional ratings
Review scores
| Source | Rating |
|---|---|
| AllMusic | (3/5) |

Soma Holiday is the first full-length major label release by the American alternative rock band Greenwheel, released in 2002 on Island Records. The title derives from the catatonic, drug-induced state of mind in Aldous Huxley's Brave New World.

== Track listing ==
1. "Shelter"
2. "Sustain You"
3. "Breathe"
4. "Louder Than Words"
5. "Strong"
6. "Drowning Man"
7. "Faces"
8. "Identity"
9. "Disappear"
10. "Dim Halo"
11. "Radiance"
12. "The End"

In Japan, the album was released with a bonus track entitled "Flood".

Prior to the release of Soma Holiday, "Shelter" originally debuted on the second soundtrack to The Fast and the Furious, titled More Fast and Furious, and later included on the Spider-Man soundtrack. The only difference between both albums is that the latter removed the first six seconds of the song.

"Strong" is featured in the video game NHL 2003.

“Breathe” was used in the season one finale of Smallville entitled “Tempest”.

"Breathe" was covered by Melissa Etheridge, which garnered her a Grammy nomination in 2005.

== Use in Public Media ==
The song "Louder Than Words" is a common ending to the popular podcast Distorted View Daily.
