= Blinded Black =

American post-hardcore band

Blinded Black is a five-piece post-hardcore band from St. Louis, Missouri. After forming in 1999 as a six-piece, the group self-released their debut album and began touring both locally and around the Midwest. The group signed with SideCho Records and began working with producer Marc McClusky. Their album Under the Sunrise was released on February 27, 2007 on SideCho Records; following its release the band toured with LoveHateHero and Vanna.

Blinded Black disbanded in March 2008. The band had a small farewell tour in Indiana and Missouri from May 16–30, with their last show being in Missouri on May 30, 2008. Since then, the members of Blinded Black have joined other bands. They reunited on May 2, 2009, for a reunion show in Evansville, Indiana. They also reunited for a show on February 25, 2011 at Pops in Sauget, Illinois, supported by Last Nights Vice, Wild Tiger, Breakdances With Wolves, Gateway Getaway, and Clayton Jones Band.

On January 4, 2017, Blinded Black announced that they have reunited after a "decade of silence", and the following month the band announced the release of their new single titled "The Next Chapter," which was released on March 3, 2017.

== Members ==
- Jeff Nizick – lead vocals
- Mike Smith – guitar
- Nick Rohlmann – guitar
- Tyler Hanks – bass guitar, unclean vocals
- Jake Rohlmann – drums, percussion

=== Former members ===
- Chuck Kraus – keyboards, synthesizers, backing vocals

== Discography ==
=== Albums ===
Date of US Release	Title	Label
2006	Sealed with a Stitch	Self-Released
February 27, 2007	Under the Sunrise	SideCho Records

=== Songs on Compilations ===
- Under the Sunrise – Warped Tour 2007 Tour Compilation
- Set in Stone – Automaton Transfusion Soundtrack
