= Breathe (Greenwheel song) =

2002 single by Greenwheel

Single by Greenwheel

from the album Soma Holiday
- Released: July 29, 2002
- Length: 3:19
- Label: Island
- Songwriter: Greenwheel
- Producer: Malcolm Springer

Greenwheel singles chronology
"Shelter" (2002)	"Breathe" (2002)

Music video
- "Breathe" on YouTube

"Breathe" is a song by American alternative rock band Greenwheel, written by members Ryan Jordan, Marc Wanninger, Andrew Dwiggins, Douglas Randall, and Brandon Armstrong. Produced by Malcolm Springer, it was released as the second single from the band's first full-length album, Soma Holiday (2002), in July 2002 and peaked at number 37 on the US Billboard Modern Rock Tracks chart. The song experienced renewed popularity in 2004 when American singer-songwriter Melissa Etheridge covered the track for her eighth studio album, Lucky (2004).

== Charts ==
Chart (2002)	Peak position
US Alternative Airplay (Billboard)	37

== Release history ==
Region	Date	Format(s)	Label(s)	Ref.
United States	July 29, 2002	Mainstream rock; active rock; alternative radio	Island	
United States	September 23, 2002	Hot adult contemporary; contemporary hit radio	Island	

== Melissa Etheridge version ==
"Breathe"

Single by Melissa Etheridge

from the album Lucky
- B-side: "Kiss Me"
- Released: January 12, 2004
- Studio: Henson (Hollywood, California)
- Length: 3:15
- Label: Island
- Songwriters: Ryan Jordan; Marc Wanninger; Andrew Dwiggins; Douglas Randall; Brandon Armstrong
- Producer: John Shanks

Melissa Etheridge singles chronology
"I Want to Be in Love" (2001)	"Breathe" (2004)	"This Moment" (2004)

Music video
- "Breathe" on YouTube

Melissa Etheridge covered "Breathe" for her eighth studio album, Lucky. Her version was produced by John Shanks and was released as the album's lead single on January 12, 2004. Although the song did not enter the Billboard Hot 100 chart, stalling at number six on the Bubbling Under Hot 100, it became Etheridge's second number-one single on the Billboard Triple-A chart, staying at the top for two weeks. It also became a top-10 hit on the Billboard Adult Top 40 and briefly charted in the Netherlands, where it reached number 96.

=== Background and release ===
"Breathe" is the only song from Lucky that Etheridge did not write. John Shanks produced the track while Paul Bushnell from American rock band Ednaswap plays bass guitar on the song. Etheridge recorded the song at Henson Recording in Hollywood, California. In the United States, AOL Music made "Breathe" available for streaming on December 1, 2003, and it was officially sent to radio on January 12, 2004, as the album's lead single. The same year, the song was released physically in the Netherlands, issued as a CD single with the B-side "Kiss Me". Lucky was released on February 10, 2004, with "Breathe" appearing as the fourth track.

=== Critical reception ===
Reviewing "Breathe" for the January 24, 2004, issue of Billboard, Keith Caulfield noted Etheridge's "warm and familiar" voice and "gutsy" vocals, calling the track "solid" and "rocking" with a "killer" chorus. During an album review for the same publication, Michael Paoletta wrote that "Breathe" does not have the same charm as Etheridge's previous hits such as "Come to My Window" and "I'm the Only One". Johnny Loftus of AllMusic was also indifferent to the track, calling it "sappy". In 2005, at the 47th Annual Grammy Awards, the song was nominated for Best Solo Rock Vocal Performance, losing to "Code of Silence" by Bruce Springsteen.

=== Credits and personnel ===
Credits are taken from the Lucky liner notes.

Studios

- Recorded at Henson Recording (Hollywood, California)
- Mixed at Image Recording Inc. (Hollywood, California)

Personnel

- Ryan Jordan – writing
- Marc Wanninger – writing
- Andrew Dwiggins – writing
- Douglas Randall – writing
- Brandon Armstrong – writing
- Melissa Etheridge – vocals, acoustic guitar
- John Shanks – acoustic and electric guitars, production
- Paul Bushnell – bass
- Jamie Muhoberac – keyboards
- Kenny Aronoff – drums
- Chris Lord-Alge – mixing
- Jeff Rothschild – engineering
- Marc Valentine – additional engineering
- Jaime Sickora – assistant engineering
- Keith Armstrong – assistant engineering
- Shari Sutcliffe – contract coordination

=== Charts ===
==== Weekly charts ====
Chart (2004)	Peak position
Netherlands (Single Top 100)	96
Quebec (ADISQ)	19
US Bubbling Under Hot 100 (Billboard)	6
US Adult Alternative Airplay (Billboard)	1
US Adult Contemporary (Billboard)	22
US Adult Pop Airplay (Billboard)	9

==== Year-end charts ====
Chart (2004)	Position
US Adult Top 40 (Billboard)	22
US Triple-A (Billboard)	15
