= Red Line Chemistry =

American hard rock band

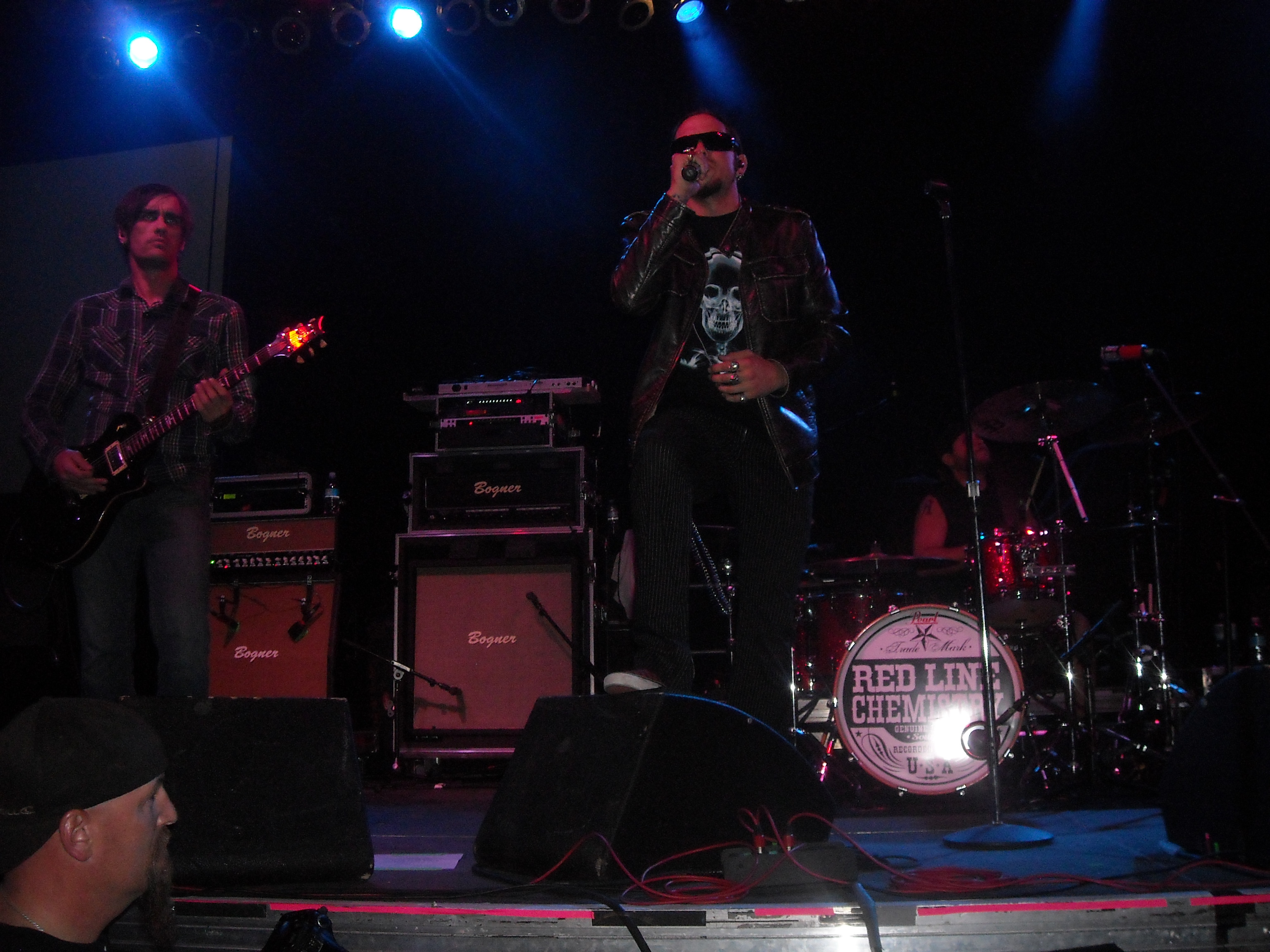
- Performing in Spokane, WA in July 2011

Background information
- Origin: Kansas City, Missouri, U.S.
- Genres: Hard rock, post-grunge
- Years active: 2004–2014
- Label: Pavement
- Members: Brett Ditgen; Andrew Breit; Dave Fyten; Tom Brown; Mike Mazzarese
- Website: redlinechemistry.com

Red Line Chemistry was an American hard rock band formed in 2004, hailing from Kansas City, Missouri. The band went on hiatus in 2014, but has since re-released their first album and performed at select shows.

== History ==
Originally named Penumbra, the band added vocalist Brett Ditgen and changed their name to Red Line Chemistry in 2004. With the help of local radio support in their home state of Missouri, the band was able to score a spot on stage at Kansas City Rock Fest 2007 and the Warped Tour. They have also performed five times between 2008 and 2011 at Pointfest, a bi-annual rock festival held by rock station KPNT FM.

With the release of Tug of War on May 14, 2013, produced by Grammy-award-winning producer Nick Raskulinecz, the band spent much of the middle of the year touring alongside Nonpoint, Drowning Pool and Whitesnake.

Red Line Chemistry went on hiatus in 2014 after parting with Vertusent Music Group. In 2015, Pavement Entertainment contacted the band about recording a new album. Frontman Brett Ditgen told Pavement the band was not in the right place to do that, but they agreed that the band's earlier work should be remixed and re-released as Chemical High & a Hand Grenade (Special Edition). The band has only done occasional shows in the Kansas City area while on hiatus.

== Members ==
- Tom Brown – bass, vocals
- Mike Mazzarese – percussion
- Dave Fyten – guitar, vocals
- Andrew Breit – guitar, keyboard, vocals
- Brett Ditgen – lead vocals

== Discography ==
=== Studio albums ===
- Chemical High & a Hand Grenade (2006)
- Dying for a Living (2010)
- Tug of War (2013)

=== Remix albums ===
- Chemical High & a Hand Grenade (Special Edition) (2015)

=== EPs ===
- Red Line Chemistry (2004)
- Escape Plan (2008)
- Easy Does It (2011)

=== Singles ===
Year	Title	US Main.	Album
2010	"Dumb Luck"	33	Dying for a Living
2011	"You Don't Get It"	37	Dying for a Living
2011	"Ultragigantor"	34	Dying for a Living
2012	"Unspoken"	34	Tug of War
2013	"Paralyzed"	33	Tug of War
2013	"Sucker Punch"	—	Tug of War
2015	"Meds For The Hypocrite"	—	Chemical High & A Hand Grenade (Special Edition) remixed & reinvented
