= Cast a Light =

Studio album by Thom Donovan
- Released: March 30, 2010
- Genre: Alternative
- Length: 41+ minutes
- Label: Lapush Recordings / AWAL

Thom Donovan chronology
Cast a Light (2010)	Mercury Maybe (2012)

Singles from Cast a Light
- 1. "Cold Winds Will Blow" Released: January 4, 2010; 2. "September Glows" Released: May 10, 2010; 3. "Let Your Love Shine On" Released: August 30, 2010

Cast a Light is the first studio album from American producer Thom Donovan. It was released on March 30, 2010, through Lapush Recordings and AWAL.

== Track listing ==
No.	Title	Length
1.	"Swear Tonight"	3:28
2.	"Cold Winds Will Blow"	4:06
3.	"Always Mine"	3:32
4.	"Knock On My Door"	3:32
5.	"Blue Rose"	5:48
6.	"I Love How You Love Me"	2:29
7.	"The Polemicist"	4:04
8.	"Who Do You Think You're Foolin'"	3:47
9.	"Let Your Love Shine On"	4:45
10.	"September Glows"	5:09
