= Greek Fire (band) =

American rock band

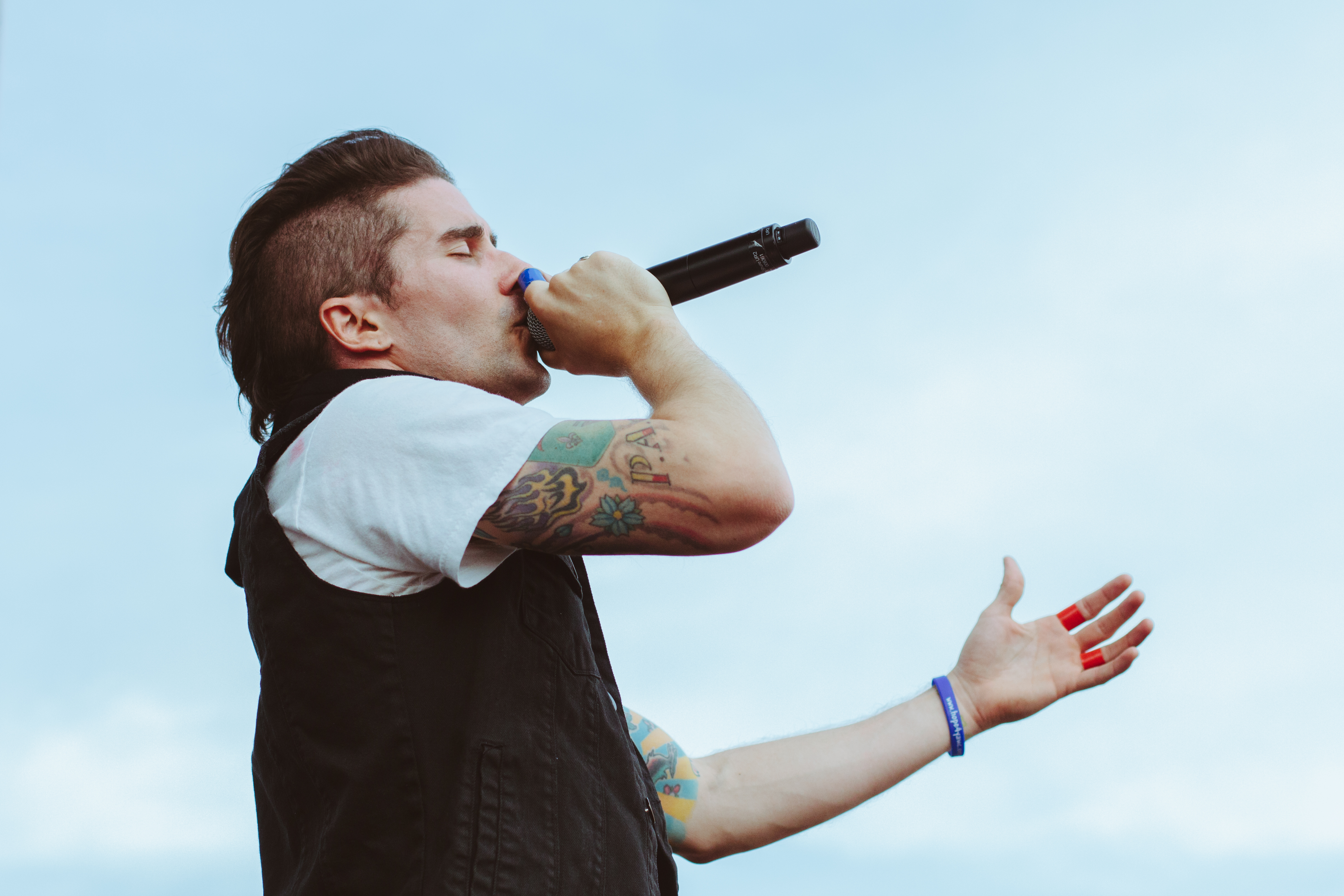
- Moon Valjean performing with Greek Fire at Pointfest 2015

Background information
- Origin: St. Louis, Missouri, US
- Genres: Alternative rock
- Years active: 2008–present
- Labels: beKko Recordings; WITHYN RECORDS
- Spinoff of: Story of the Year
- Members: Philip "Moon Valjean" Sneed; Johnny Venus; Chris Hobbs; Brian "Pookee Jones" Smith
- Past members: Ryan Phillips; Mark Roth

Greek Fire is an American rock band from St. Louis, Missouri. The band was formed in 2008 by Philip Sneed and Ryan Phillips, the members of rock bands Story of the Year and Maybe Today. Since formation, Greek Fire has released a self-titled EP, a single titled "Doesn't Matter Anyway", on August 16, 2011, they released their debut, full-length album, Deus Ex Machina, the hit EP Lost featuring A Real Life and Top of The World (Big Hero 6.) A full length in 2018 titled Broken, and an EP entitled "Orientation." They have since announced a reforming of the group along with a brand new full length album for late 2026.

== History ==
=== Formation (2008–09) ===
In May 2009, Philip Sneed (aka Moon Valjean) and Ryan Phillips (both from Story of the Year) joined with Johnny Venus and Mark Joseph Roth (both from Maybe Today) to start performing as the band Greek Fire. While their first official show was on May 16, 2009, the band's short documentary posted on YouTube specifies that the band formed in 2008.

=== Debut EP and "Doesn't Matter Anyway" (2009–10) ===
Greek Fire posted numerous demos (including some teaser clips) since forming, the oldest of which are their songs titled "Dreaming in Deja Vu", "The Ride", and "Down In Mexico" which first appeared on MySpace.

Greek Fire released a three-song EP on November 19, 2010, while they continued to write and record music for a currently unreleased full-length album. Greek Fire went to the studio in late January 2011 to record. Greek Fire released "Doesn't Matter Anyway" to iTunes on March 10, 2011. "Doesn't Matter Anyway" has received considerable radio play in St. Louis on 105.7 ThePOINT KPNT, Sirius Satellite Radio, KSHE95, and in Chicago at Q101 since then.

=== Deus Ex Machina (2011–12) ===
Greek Fire played several live performances at venues throughout the midwest: Fubar Lounge, Pops Nightclub and Verizon Wireless Amphitheater in Saint Louis, MO (where they opened for Incubus on August 20, 2011, and played in POINTFest in May and September 2011), as well as many other locations including Columbia, MO (where they opened for Good Charlotte), Toledo OH, Grand Rapids MI and Chicago IL where they opened for the band Madina Lake.

On August 1, 2011, Greek Fire announced that they would be releasing their independent debut album Deus Ex Machina on August 16, 2011, through many outlets, online and otherwise.

In support of Deus Ex Machina the band toured with Eve 6 and played Pointfest along with Megadeth, Incubus, P.O.D., Chevelle, HURT and more, and played Uproar with Godsmack, Staind, Papa Roach, Shinedown, Thousand Foot Krutch and Adelitas Way.

=== Lost/Broken/Found (2012–present) ===
The band announced at the 2012 HoHo show that their next album will be entitled Lost/Found. The first single, "A Real Life" from the record was released March 12, 2013. The second single "Top Of The World" was released on December 2, 2013, and a stripped-down version was released February 21, 2014.

The band later announced that the concept album would instead be released as 2 EPs called Lost and Found respectively. The Lost EP was released on May 13, 2014.

They later added a third EP to be released before Found titled Broken

James Gunn, a St. Louis native, planned to feature the band in the soundtrack to Guardians of the Galaxy, but ultimately decided to stay with a mix of 1970's music.

In September 2014, "Top Of The World" was featured in a commercial spot for Disney's Big Hero 6, while "A Real Life" was featured in a November episode of The Bold and the Beautiful.

Sneed (aka moon) is now a member of the "Rizzuto Show" on 105.7 THE POINT

== Johnny Venus illness ==
While touring in Japan in early 2012, Johnny Venus started to feel exhaustion. After the tour in Japan, Venus's exhaustion did not fade. When he returned home, he had some blood tests. Hours after the blood tests, Venus was admitted to the hospital with a diagnosis of Acute promyelocytic leukemia. Venus had no medical insurance. While he was recovering and receiving treatment, the band asked Story of the Year singer, Dan Marsala, to play drums with Greek Fire. Marsala did so for the months of June and July. Venus completed his first round of treatment in early August. On November 10, 2012, Venus made his official return to the group in a show at Missouri University of Science and Technology. He has declared himself cancer-free and has returned to touring with the band.

== Musical style ==
The band describes themselves this way:

Greek Fire is a mission to capture the attention of a rock deprived generation. A mission to re-vitalize the spirit of rock music in all of its purity and greatness. A mission to create uplifting, soaring music for those who need it now more than ever. Greek Fire is composed of four young men from the planet Earth, each sharing an extreme passion for their respective instruments. Greek Fire is about purity and expression, poetry and mystery, the beauty of the journey. Faith in something greater, a quest into the unknown, a connection with the fire within. Embracing the power of words, the beauty of the guitar riff, the energy created through real rhythm, Greek Fire is a quest to resurrect the greatness of rock music for those who want something more. Natural melodies and rhythm with no cover ups, no pitch correction, no splicing and dicing it to perfection, just the spirit of that natural and attitude-filled first take. We invite you to the ride.

== Members ==
Current members

- Philip "Moon Valjean" Sneed - lead vocals, piano, rhythm guitar, keyboards, synthesizers (2008–present)
- Johnny Venus - drums, percussion (2008–present)
- Chris Hobbs - guitar (2018–present)
- Brian "Pookee Jones" Smith - bass guitar, backing vocals (2025–present)

Touring Members

- Dan Marsala - drums, percussion (2012)

Past members

- Ryan Phillips - guitar (2008–2018)
- Mark Roth - bass (2008–2024)

== Discography ==
=== Studio albums ===
Title	Album Details	Peak chart positions		
Title	Album Details	Rock Albums	Hard Rock Albums	Heatseekers Albums
Deus Ex Machina	Released: August 16, 2011; Label: beKko Recordings; Formats: CD, Digital download, LP	—	—	—
BROKEN	Released: July 12, 2019; Label: WITHYN RECORDS; Formats: CD, Digital download, LP	—	—	—
"—" denotes a recording that did not chart or was not released in that territory.

=== Extended plays ===
- Greek Fire (2010)
- LOST (2014)
- ORIENTATION (2018)

=== Singles ===
Year	Song	Album
2010	"Doesn't Matter Anyway"	Deus Ex Machina
2011	"Break Me Down"	Deus Ex Machina
2012	"If This Is the End (The Sound of Belief)"	BROKEN
2013	"A Real Life"	LOST
2013	"Top of the World"	LOST
2014	"Coming Alive"	LOST
2017	"Coming Out of the Rain"	BROKEN
2018	"The Ride"	ORIENTATION
2018	"Running Away"	ORIENTATION
2019	"I Do"	BROKEN
2019	"True Colors"	BROKEN
2020	"I Don't Wanna Leave This Place"	BROKEN

=== Music videos ===
List of music videos, showing year released, album and director(s)
Title	Year	Album	Director(s)
"Doesn't Matter Anyway"	2011	Deus Ex Machina	
"If This Is the End (The Sound of Belief)"	2012	BROKEN	
"Top of the World"	2014	LOST	Justin James Muir
"Coming Out of the Rain"	2017	BROKEN	
"The Ride"	2018	ORIENTATION	Jordan Phoenix and Ben Vogelsang
"I Do"	2019	BROKEN	Ben Vogelsang
"True Colors"	2019	BROKEN	Jordan Phoenix and Ben Vogelsang
"Coming Alive"	2021	LOST	J.T. Ibanez
"A Real Life"	2024	LOST	Kavan the Kid
"Top Of The World (Real Fans, Real Moments)"	2026	LOST	
