= Stir (band) =

American alt-rock ensemble

- Origin: St. Louis, Missouri
- Genre: Alternative rock
- Years active: 1994–2005, 2016–present
- Label: Capitol
- Members: Andy Schmidt; Kevin Gagnepain; Brad Booker; Michael Eisenbeis; Jake Elking
- Past members: Thom Donovan; John Pessoni

Stir is a four piece alternative rock band from St. Louis, Missouri.

== History ==
=== Formation and major label signing ===
Stir was founded in 1994 as a three-piece band at the University of Missouri, and consisted of lead vocalist and guitarist Andy Schmidt, bassist Kevin Gagnepain, and drummer Brad Booker. Schmidt, Gagnepain, and Booker had been in another band previously to Stir named "The Choice" and decided to form the band when that band's lead singer, Rick Smith, decided to no longer pursue a music career.

The band released a self-produced, independent LP titled "Until Now" in 1995 under its own label, Stir Music. Later that year, the band played at the South by Southwest festival. The band signed with the indie label Aware Records following the performance, subsequently releasing their eponymous debut album, Stir, in 1996. This record included much of the material from the independent release. Later signed up by major label Capitol Records, the self-titled Stir was re-released to wider distribution.

Under the Capitol imprint they also released their second record, Holy Dogs, in 2000 and were praised by radio program directors as the "new golden boys."

=== Commercial efforts and successes ===
The band found some radio success in the alternative rock genre. The highest-charting single was "Looking For", from the eponymous debut, which peaked at number 8 in 1997 on the Billboard mainstream rock chart. However, the follow-up single, "One Angel" was said to be their breakthrough song, but failed to significantly chart during its release. The two singles from Holy Dogs, "New Beginning" and "Climbing The Walls", also saw some success on the Billboard charts in 2000, but were ill-supported by Capitol. While on tour with Train, five songs from the band's set, including "Superstation", were broadcast live on the Westwood One radio network. During this time the band also made two appearances on the nationally syndicated radio show Rockline, on May 12, 1997, and March 13, 2000. During support of Holy Dogs they made an appearance on then-popular VH1 show The List, performing "New Beginning" as well as a cover of the Nirvana single "In Bloom" live in the studio. Rumors and talks of a late night TV performance never blossomed, although the band has stated they were close to appearing on the Late Show with David Letterman.

Even with all of this self-promotion, and the semi-success of the singles, Holy Dogs failed to make a dent in the industry, selling roughly 45,000 copies by the end of the album cycle.

In late 2001/early 2002, Andy and Kevin entered a new song of theirs into the International Songwriting Competition, an annual contest typically receiving 15,000+ entries from bands and artists around the globe, featuring industry judges such as Rob Thomas of matchbox twenty, Arif Mardin, and many others. Their song, "Skeletons", won the grand prize out of all entries.

This song, plus others such as "Hold On" and "What You Do", were slated for release on the band's forthcoming album, which Capitol Records had scheduled for release on April 22, 2003.

=== Changes and setbacks ===
Following the tour in support of Holy Dogs, founding member and drummer Brad Booker left the band to pursue a solo career, arranging compositions for some Volkswagen and NCAA ads, as well as joining up briefly with Gravity Kills and then Apartment 26 (see notes below). In addition to his replacement on drums, a second guitarist was added to the band. At a concert in St. Louis on July 5, 2002, the newly reformed Stir appeared for the first time as a four piece, now including:

- Thom Donovan, guitarist (Lapush)
- John Pessoni, drummer (formerly of The Urge)

Stir debuted several new songs, including "Not the Only One", "First Time", and "Hold On." They also performed a cover of Guns N' Roses "Sweet Child o' Mine", as well as the fan-favorite cover of Ozzy Osbourne's "Crazy Train", which had been previously recorded for the Westwood One In Concert program. All of the original songs, also possibly including a studio cover of The Who's "Baba O'Riley", were set to be released on the group's third major-label disc on April 22, 2003. However, weeks before the scheduled release date, the album was shelved indefinitely due to a shift in the label's ownership and management.

Attributed to this change, a falling out occurred with Capitol Records, as everyone who was behind the band had either left or been fired by Capitol, leaving the group in limbo and the album of new material without official release. The band was eventually dropped by Capitol after extended talks, but the label retained the rights to the unreleased material as well as the previous albums (both of which were out of print, but have since been reissued, both physically and digitally). As posted to the band's message board, bassist Kevin Gagnepain refers to the unreleased CD by the title Untitled, Unmastered, and Unemployed. Since then, much of the material has been released to the internet by the band and is also available at an unofficial site with a large amount of compiled live and unreleased material, stirmusic.net.

=== Start of decade-long hiatus ===
The band unofficially broke up in 2005, shortly after Andy and Kevin played an acoustic concert on 11/26 at The Pageant in St. Louis, in support of a local musicians showcase. Gagnepain had stated on numerous occasions that the band is not indefinitely finished. However, there were rumors circulating that Schmidt confirmed at the time that the likelihood of any type of Stir reunion or concert is "very slim" and "probably won't happen."

During the extended hiatus as Stir, several members established themselves in new musical efforts as solo artists or with new bands during the lull:

- Brad Booker, after spending time in the groups Gravity Kills and Apartment 26, currently writes solo music and has racked up credits as producer, mixer, and co-writer with acts such as Piper and Bloom, J. Relic, Mic Averich, and Apryl Lauren. He is also involved in the cover band, Wyld Stallyns. In addition, he has played drums on Chloe Day's Trip-Hop hit "Kingpin". He is also currently a successful real estate agent in St. Louis.
- Founding member and bassist Kevin Gagnepain was the bassist with Tobi Kai & the Strays. Currently, he plays bass in the tongue-in-cheek cover band Joe Dirt and the Dirty Boys Band (using the stage moniker "Jethro Dirt") and also with his new St. Louis based band, Shooting With Annie. He has also joined an alt-country band called Whiskey Morning, who released their debut album in October 2016.
- Thom Donovan founded the band Lapush, handling vocals and guitar. In 2004, the band signed to Carson Daly's co-owned label, FourFiveSix (Universal). Lapush appeared on Last Call with Carson Daly on NBC (Dec. 2, 2005). Their debut album, Someplace Closer To Here, was released on June 5, 2005. The album went to #15 on the Alternative/Specialty Chart and featured the singles, "Quit You Now" and "Aurora". "Aurora" was also featured in the television show Moonlight on CBS. The band released their second album, Modern Blues, in 2007. Songs from this release have appeared in several television shows on MTV, including The Hills, and College Life.
- Thom lives in Nashville and has a recurring role as a musician on Nashville on ABC. His third studio album, Canon, was released on June 17, 2014, and features a collaboration with Wyclef Jean and Ruby Amanfu. The album was mixed by Grammy winning engineer, Vance Powell (Jack White, The White Stripes). His music continues to appear in major TV shows, including The Good Wife on CBS and Body of Proof on ABC. Thom and Ruby appeared live in New Orleans at the Voodoo Music + Arts Festival with Nine Inch Nails, Pearl Jam, and The Cure. Currently, Thom is touring with Will Hoge as his lead guitar player. He was also involved in the recording of Hoge's 2017 album, Anchors.
- Thom writes for Kobalt Music Group.
- John Pessoni is still active in the St. Louis music scene as part of Joe Dirt and the Dirty Boys Band (using the stage moniker "Johnny Dirt"), as well as The Urge.

The original members of STIR started a "side gig" as El Monstero y Los Masked Avengers back in the early 2000s, where they would play a Pink Floyd cover show in between album/tour cycles in order to stay sharp and earn some cash. Over the years, the concerts became an annual ritual, and grew in both size, scope, and production. Today, El Monstero has grown to be a very well regarded Pink Floyd tribute band and typically plays 10-15 shows per year throughout the Midwest, including an annual "residency" of shows during the Christmas season in St. Louis. While the original members of STIR started the band, Kevin is the only one still an active member of El Monstero.

Andy Schmidt is still residing in the Los Angeles, California area, working for Roland Sands Designs. He occasionally performs solo acoustic shows.

=== 2016 reunion ===
St. Louis radio station 105.7 The Point announced on April 19, 2016, that Stir would be part of the lineup for its Wayback Pointfest on July 9, 2016, at the Hollywood Casino Amphitheater.

The original members, Andy, Brad, and Kevin, along with supporting musicians, rocked through a ten-song setlist, including "Lady Bug", "One Angel", "Holy Dogs" and "Hold On". They also belted out a cover of the Led Zeppelin hit "Kashmir."

Due to the overwhelming response to the festival appearance, it was announced the following week that Stir had been tapped to be the inaugural concert on September 30 at Delmar Hall, a new 750 capacity venue next to The Pageant in the Delmar Loop area of St. Louis. Tickets for the show went on sale on July 15, and within hours, the concert sold out. The band delivered an over 2 hour set for the show, covering the expanse of their career (including a number of songs from their unreleased third album). Their setlist included covers of U2's ""Where The Streets Have No Name" and Simple Minds' "Don't You (Forget About Me)". Andy Schmidt and his brother, Justin, also performed a brand new song called "Steve's Song (Free From It All)" which Andy wrote as a tribute to their father, who had died in December 2015.

In the weeks leading up the September 30 concert, it was announced that due to the quick sellout of Delmar Hall, an "Encore" concert was scheduled for December 2 at The Pageant.

The band would not deny the possibility of more of these "pop-up" or annual concerts in the future, and indicated that they'd be up for them if they were continually welcomed. Outside of that, the future of the band was up in the air.

=== 2018 concerts ===
After taking 2017 off, the band announced on Facebook that they would be opening for Daughtry at the 2018 O'Fallon Heritage and Freedom Festival on the 4th of July in O'Fallon, MO, along with Portrait: The Music of Kansas and the School of Rock Ballwin House Band. Two of the members of Portrait, James Comparato and Mike Gregory, are longtime friends of Andy Schmidt and the original STIR lineup and have a storied history of sharing stages together with their band Almost Joshua, both with The Choice and Stir.

Later that summer, it was announced that Stir would perform at the Aware Records 25th Anniversary Concert at House Of Blues in Chicago on November 9. Other performers included Matt Scannell of Vertical Horizon, Alice Peacock, Brian Vander Ark of The Verve Pipe, Jackopierce, and a special performance by Isaac Slade of The Fray. The sold out concert was a hit with critics, and praise was specifically placed on Stir's rousing acoustic set.

== Discography ==
=== Albums ===
- Fall, 1993, Forty Lashes Music (independent release as four-piece band "The Choice")
- ...Until Now, 1995, Stir Music (independent release as three-piece band "Stir")
- STIR, 1996, Aware Records, re-released on Capitol Records
- Holy Dogs, 2000, Capitol Records
- Untitled, Unmastered, and Unemployed, 2003, (unreleased)

=== Charting singles ===
| Year | Title | Chart Positions | | Album |
| Year | Title | US Modern Rock | US Mainstream Rock | Album |
|---|---|---|---|---|
| 1996 | "Looking For" | - | 8 | STIR |
| 1997 | "One Angel" | - | 23 | STIR |
| 1997 | "Stale" | - | 21 | STIR |
| 2000 | "New Beginning" | 18 | 16 | Holy Dogs |
| 2000 | "Climbing the Walls" | 39 | 39 | Holy Dogs |
