= One Lone Car =

American alternative rock band

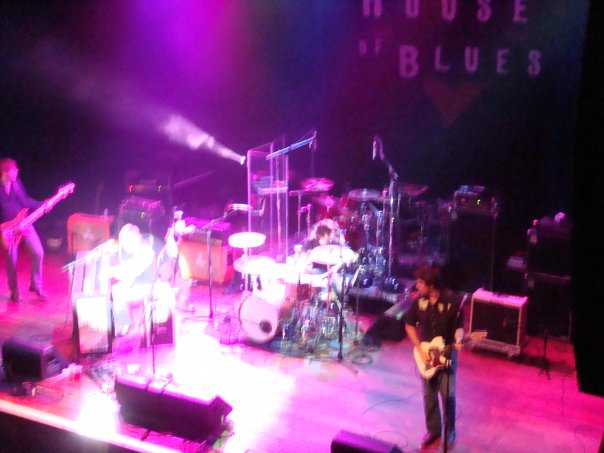
- One Lone Car at House of Blues Atlantic City, 2008

Background information
- Origin: St. Louis, Missouri, United States
- Genres: Rock, alternative rock
- Years active: 2004–2011
- Labels: Shock City, Uranus
- Past members: Dustin Plegge; Aaron Kellim; Brian White; Chris Rhein; Neal Klein; Michael Hickey; Andy Herrin
- Website: www.onelonecar.com

One Lone Car is an indie rock band from St. Louis, Missouri. Formed in 2004 by Dustin Plegge and Andy Herrin. They combined members from Satellite Affair and Behind the Stars, both bands originally from Alton, IL They self-released the Variety Half Hour EP in 2005. MTV licensed the album that same year.

== Background ==
One Lone Car was approached by keyboardist Doug Firley of Gravity Kills in 2006 about his new label he had recently started, Shock City Records. The band went into the studio and recorded two new songs with producers Doug Firley and Chris Loesch. Variety Hour was released on October 31, 2006, through Shock City Records. The album was a re-release of the 2005 independent Variety Half Hour EP, which featured two new songs, "The City" and "Mention Love". Variety Hour, like the original release, was also licensed to MTV.

One Lone Car met Robin Wilson of Gin Blossoms in 2006. Drummer Andy Herrin had received the phone number for Robin's studio and called and left a voicemail about One Lone Car. Robin checked the band out online and personally called them back to discuss working on an album with them. The band recorded North, South, East and the Rest in May 2007 at Uranus Recording Studio in Tempe, Arizona. The album was produced by Jamie Woolford of The Stereo and Let Go and co-produced by Robin Wilson, both of which provide guest vocals and percussion. The album was released on April 8, 2008, on Wilson's label, Uranus Recordings. Shortly after the album's release, the band embarked on a tour with Gin Blossoms. While on tour, Wilson would join the band onstage nightly to perform three songs. The band has said in interviews that Wilson became the fifth member of One Lone Car at that time. The songs "Highway" and "Villain" appeared in The Hills marathon, The Hills: The Lost Scenes on MTV in the summer of 2008. One Lone Car returned to producer Jamie Woolford in December 2008 to record EP23 at his home studio in Tempe, Arizona.

Flickerstick invited One Lone Car to join them for a secret farewell show at Lola's in Fort Worth, Texas in January 2009. The show was billed as The Obsolete Queers with One Lone Car. In February 2009, One Lone Car performed with Chuck Berry at Blueberry Hill in their hometown of St. Louis, Missouri. Aaron Kellim, left the band in September 2009 to focus on his new project Audri and Aaron. He was replaced by Chris Rhein shortly after. In October 2009, One Lone Car played their first live show with their new lineup at The Wildhorse Saloon in Nashville, with Soul Asylum. On January 7, 2011, the band performed an entire set of all new material at The Double Door in Chicago with Marcy Playground. In January 2011, One Lone Car performed with the Pussycat Dolls and Auburn at House of Blues in Park City, Utah for the Sundance Film Festival. On October 6, 2011, the band joined the B-52's for a sold-out show at The Wildhorse Saloon in Nashville, Tennessee. In 2011, Neal Klein and Michael Hickey joined the band John Henry & The Engine. In July 2012, it was announced that drummer Andy Herrin had joined the band Cavo.

In 2012 drummer Andy Herrin formed the band *repeat repeat with Jared Corder and in 2016 brought in former One Lone Car guitarist Neal Klein to the project. Herrin left *repeat repeat in 2017. After leaving *repeat repeat, Herrin went on to play drums for Framing Hanley, David Cook, Will Hoge, Better Than Ezra.

In 2019, “We Are In The Wild And We Are Home”, a collaboration by Matthew Caws of Nada Surf and John Davis of Superdrag, was released featuring Andy Herrin on drums.

In 2024 drummer Andy Herrin began playing drums for Gin Blossoms and is currently on tour with them.

== Discography ==
=== Albums ===
Title	Type	Label	Release date
Variety Half Hour	EP	Self Released	2005
Variety Hour	full-length CD	Shock City Records	October 31, 2006
North, South, East, and the Rest	full-length CD	Uranus Recordings	April 8, 2008
EP23	EP	Uranus Recordings/Downtrodden	March 3, 2009
