= Thom Donovan =

American musician, producer (born 1974)

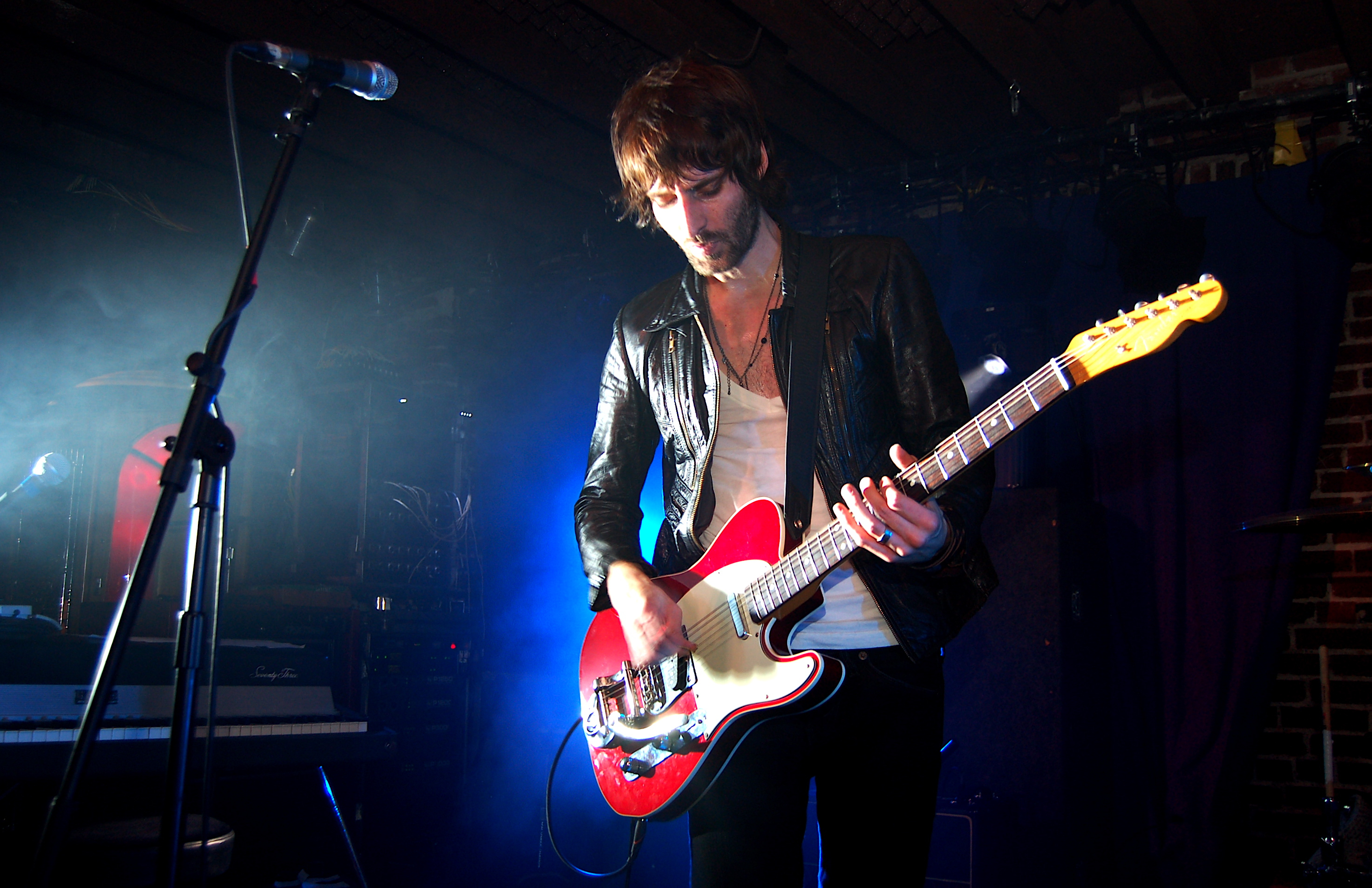
- Thom Donovan performing with Lapush at the Duck Room in St. Louis, MO, 2008.

Background information
- Born: Thomas Joseph Donovan; July 24, 1974 (age 52)
- Origin: St. Louis, Missouri, United States
- Genres: Alternative rock, Indie rock, Singer/songwriter
- Occupations: Guitarist, Singer, Songwriter, Producer, and Author
- Instruments: Guitar, Voice, Bass, Keyboards
- Years active: 1995–present

Thom Donovan (born Thomas Joseph Donovan; July 24, 1974, in St. Louis, Missouri) is an American guitarist, singer, songwriter, and writer. His first novel The Twin Affair was published by Pegasus on September 28, 2023.

Donovan has released five solo albums and was the lead vocalist and guitarist of the band Lapush. His international performance career has included concerts across the United States as well as cities around the world. Donovan has performed with Brandi Carlile, Ruby Amanfu, Will Hoge, and worked with Wyclef Jean of The Fugees on his single, "Shipwreck".

Donovan's music has frequently appeared in film and television, and he had a recurring uncredited background role in the ABC musical drama series, Nashville, as a musician.

Since 2023, Donovan has written for American Songwriter.

== Childhood and early life ==
Of Irish and Italian descent, Donovan, the middle of three children, was born in St. Louis, MO. His father's record collection inspired him to begin writing songs at a young age. Thom Donovan was educated at Lindenwood University where he graduated with a BA in music, studying under John McClellan (Luciano Pavarotti). At Lindenwood, Donovan performed in a master class with Scott Tennant of the Los Angeles Guitar Quartet.

== Career ==
=== Novel ===
Donovan's first novel, The Twin Affair, was published on September 28, 2023. Author and journalist Keel Hunt of The Tennessean described the book as "true to this current moment in our nation - a gripping tale of human nature, politics and madness." His non-fiction writing on music has appeared in American Songwriter. He's written pieces on R.E.M., Oasis, Kim Gordon, Red Hot Chili Peppers, and others.

=== Early work (1995–2000) ===
While in college, Thom Donovan formed a duo with his brother, Stephen Donovan, called Elevator to a Penthouse. The duo's primary influences were Velvet Underground and the sounds of Motown, which the brothers had discovered in their father's record collection. An album, bigelectricheart, was recorded on 8-track, half-inch tape.

=== Stir, Capitol Records, and Lapush (2001–2008) ===
In 2001, Donovan formed Lapush with his brother, Stephen. Singing and playing guitar and working as the band's primary songwriter and producer, Lapush marked the first time Donovan would front a band on his own. However, Lapush would have to wait, as later in 2001, Donovan briefly joined the band Stir in the studio during the recording of their third studio album (which was never officially released). He then agreed to tour the album once it was released and performed St. Louis-area gigs with the band from 2002 through 2003. However, the band was dropped from their label, Capitol Records, and then went on hiatus, allowing Donovan to concentrate on Lapush.

In 2004, Lapush signed to 456 Entertainment (Fontana/Universal) and released their debut album, Someplace Closer to Here, in June 2005. Later that same year, the band would make their television debut performing on Last Call with Carson Daly on NBC. The album featured the singles "Aurora", "Quit You Now", and "Say Something". Songs from the album were featured frequently in film and television, including Moonlight on CBS as well as Laguna Beach and The Hills on MTV.

The band's second album Modern Blues was released in 2007 and featured the singles "Closer", "Run", and "Leave The Light On". Modern Blues was dedicated to the memory of Donovan's father, who died in 2006 from pancreatic cancer. Donovan penned the song "Closer" for his father. Songs from this record were featured on several television shows. Lapush also performed with Nikka Costa, Matt Nathanson, The Sounds and Hot Hot Heat. Donovan produced and mixed both Lapush albums in his home studio, The Control Tower.

Lapush officially broke up in June 2008.

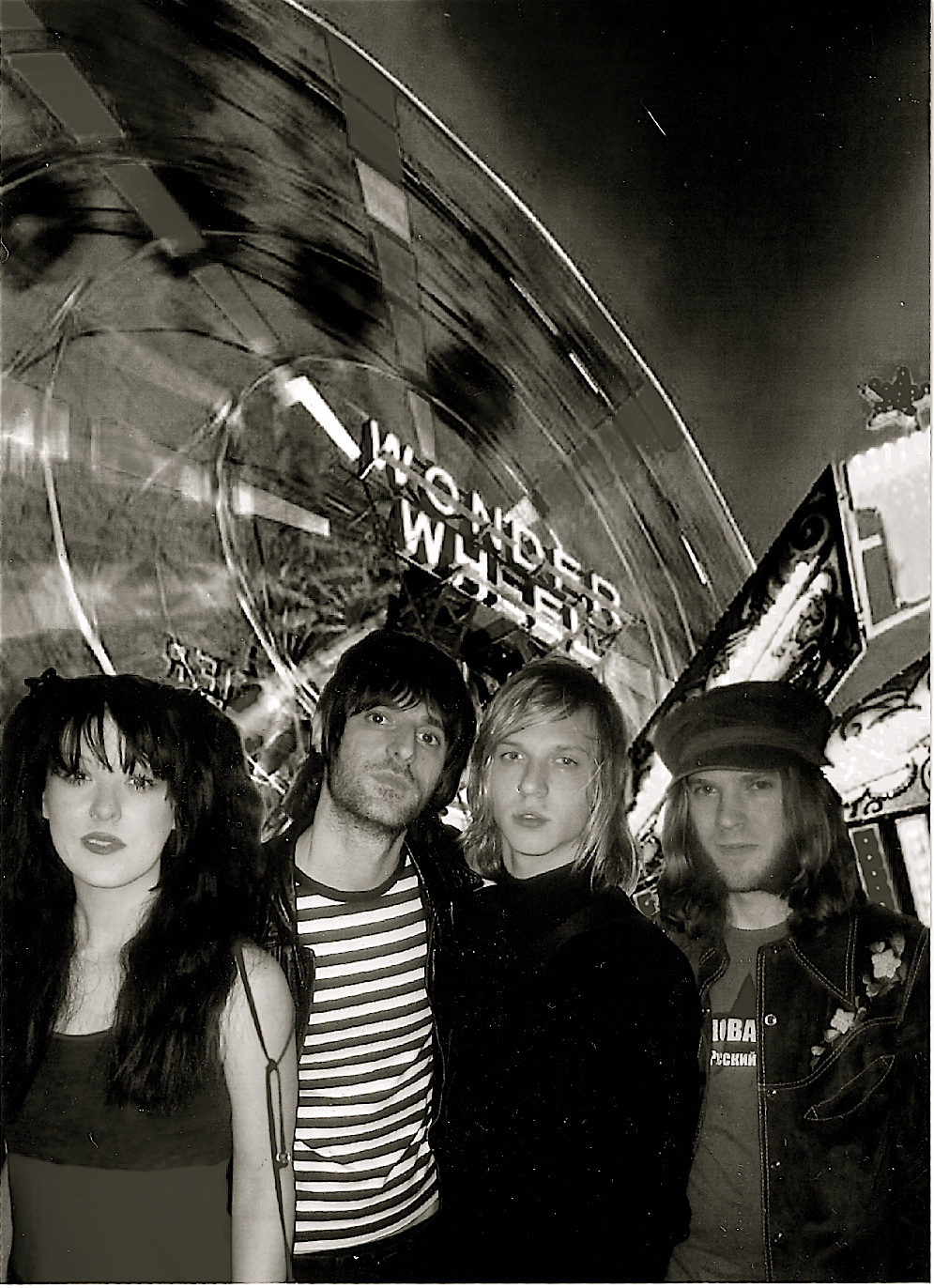
Thom Donovan with Lapush (2008)

=== Solo career/Nashville (2008–present) ===
"I Love How You Love Me" was the first solo single released by Donovan in 2008. Donovan's first solo performance was on July 26, 2008, in St. Louis, MO, opening for OneRepublic.

Cast A Light, Donovan's debut solo album, was released on March 30, 2010, through his own imprint, Lapush Recordings. "September Glows", the final track from Cast A Light has been featured on KROQ-FM in Los Angeles and has also been featured on MTV. Songs from Cast A Light have appeared in television shows on MTV, and VH-1. Donovan celebrated the release of his first solo album with two performances at SXSW in Austin, TX on March 17, 2010.

Donovan moved from St. Louis to Nashville in 2010 after signing a publishing contract with Nettwerk and Revelry Music Group. He signed a new publishing contract with Kobalt in 2012. Donovan's solo albums are released via AWAL, a London-based distributor owned by Kobalt.

Mercury Maybe, was released on March 27, 2012. The first single, "Drive", was re-recorded and taken from the original Elevator to a Penthouse sessions. Donovan collaborated with Ken Harrison and Roberta Carter-Harrison from Wild Strawberries on Mercury Maybe. Donovan and Harrison co-wrote "Division Street", "Liza", and "Still All Right". Roberta Carter-Harrison sang on "Drive" and "Still All Right". The trio would eventually collaborate on an electronic project called Sealt in 2013, releasing an EP.

Donovan released his third solo album, Canon, on June 17, 2014. Donovan collaborated with Wyclef Jean and Ruby Amanfu on the album's first single, "Shipwreck". The video for "Shipwreck" was directed by Anthony Matula and features members of the Nashville Ballet. Donovan composed the lyrics for "Shipwreck"—inspired by Arthur Brooke and his poem, The Tragicall History of Romeus and Juliet (1562). The album was mixed by Grammy award-winning engineer, Vance Powell.

Donovan released his fourth album, Sea of Stories, on July 6, 2018. Sea of Stories is an electronic album featuring the singles "So Cruel", "Ship Is Coming In", and "How's It Gonna Be?".

Timekeeper was released on June 18, 2021. On Donovan's fifth studio album, the sound was focused primarily on acoustic guitar. The album was inspired by a music festival he played in November 2019 in the Dominican Republic with John Prine.

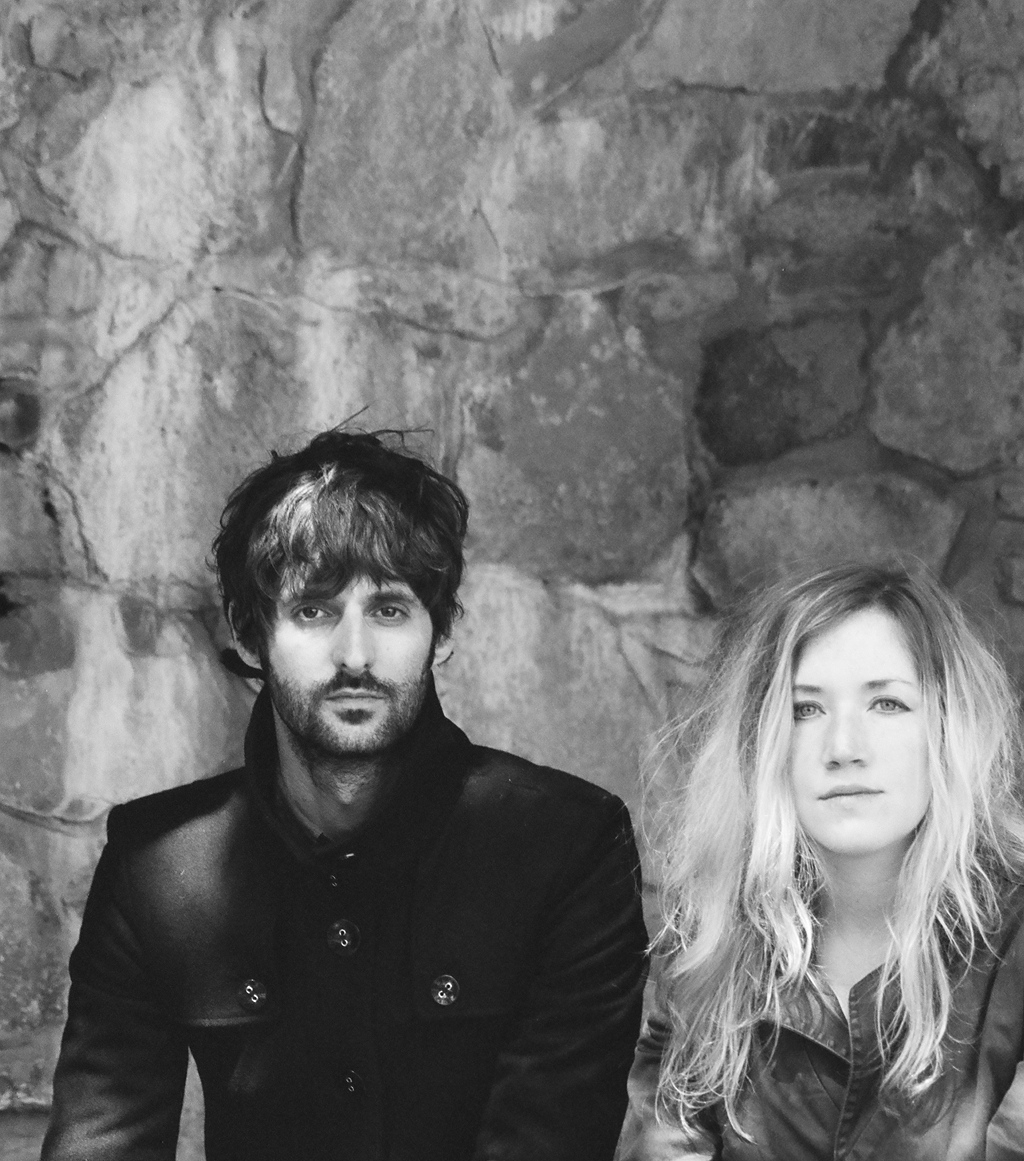
Rossi (2012)

=== Rossi (2012–2013) ===
In January 2012, Donovan formed Rossi with Kendall Morgan. Before launching Rossi, the two co-wrote a song called "Overload," which Morgan released as solo material and was featured on CBS's The Good Wife. The group's first two singles, "Ossetia" and "War Within", were featured on My Old Kentucky Blog's radio show on Sirius Satellite Radio. Rossi's debut show was on March 2, 2012, at The Basement in Nashville opening for Mona. "War Within" has been featured on Simon Raymonde's radio show on Amazing Radio in the UK.

On March 5, 2013, Rossi's third single, "Your God", appeared in an episode of Body of Proof on ABC.

=== Will Hoge (2017–2023) ===
Donovan was tapped by Will Hoge to play guitar on his studio album "Anchors." Donovan officially joined the band in early 2017. Hoge and Donovan initially spoke of Donovan joining Hoge's band around 2007, but Donovan's schedule did not allow him to join at the time.

== Musical equipment and sound ==
Donovan has been credited with a unique sound and approach to the guitar. Rick Anderson, Allmusic comments: "Tout Le Monde" features what is probably the best six-note guitar solo ever recorded." Donovan cites a combination of traditional, classical, and electronic music as sources of inspiration. In an interview with Amplifier Magazine, Donovan states, "The idea is to blend two things that have no business with each other. I enjoy composing on the computer as much as writing with an acoustic instrument. I want to take sounds from the past and push them into the future."

=== Influences ===
Donovan's earliest influence was the sound of Motown, discovered in his father's record collection. Other notable influences include: Leonard Cohen, The Velvet Underground, John Frusciante, The Smiths, and Oasis. Donovan studied classical guitar in college.

== Film and television ==
Donovan's music has appeared in film and television including: Body of Proof, The Good Wife, Moonlight, The Hills, The City, and Laguna Beach: The Real Orange County.

Donovan appeared in an uncredited role as a guitarist and keyboardist in Nashville, seen at different times in the background, playing in the bands of characters Avery Barkley (Jonathan Jackson), Deacon Claybourne (Charles Esten) and Scarlett O'Connor (Clare Bowen).

In December 2005, Donovan – with Lapush – performed two songs on an episode of Last Call with Carson Daly; Carson Daly co-founded the band's record label, 456.

== Discography (Solo career) ==
=== Albums ===
- (2021) Timekeeper
- (2018) Sea of Stories
- (2014) Canon
- (2012) Mercury Maybe
- (2010) Cast a Light

== Discography (Lapush) ==
=== Albums & EPs ===
- (2007) Modern Blues
- (2005) Someplace Closer to Here
- (2003) an EP by Lapush

== Collaborations ==
- 2025: The Collections, Vol. VIII by Ruby Amanfu (Credits: guitar solo on "You're My Favorite")
- 2025: Blackbird on a Lonely Wire (Will's Version) by Will Hoge (Credits: mix engineer on "King of Grey" and "Baby Girl")
- 2022–2025: Guitarist for Leigh Nash
- 2024: Big Love - Single by Ruby Amanfu (Credits: co-writer, co-producer, all instruments, mix engineer)
- 2013–2014, 2019–2023: Guitarist and music director for Ruby Amanfu
- 2017–2023: Guitarist for Will Hoge
- 2022: War Within by Kendall Morgan (Credits: songwriter)
- 2022: Arsenic by Dave Hause (Credits: ambient guitar)
- 2022: Wings on My Shoes by Will Hoge (Credits: guitar)
- 2021: Different Plans by Jackie Darlene (Credits: guitar)
- 2020: Tiny Little Movies by Will Hoge (Credits: guitar, background vocals)
- 2018: My American Dream by Will Hoge (Credits: guitar, background vocals)
- 2017: Anchors by Will Hoge (Credits: guitar)
- 2016: Buffalo by Shelly Fairchild (Credits: co-writer "Lies")
- 2016: Guitarist for Shelly Fairchild
- 2013: "Love Out Loud" single by Ruby Amanfu (Credits: co-producer)
- 2013: 1 EP by Sealt (Credits: producer, co-writer)
- 2013: "Your God" single by Rossi (Credits: producer, co-writer)
- 2012: "War Within" single by Rossi (Credits: producer, co-writer)
- 2012: "Ossetia" single by Rossi (Credits: producer, co-writer)
- 2012: Through Frozen Forests EP by Aaron Espe (Credits: co-writer on "Turn")
- 2012: Three by Aaron Espe (Credits: mastering)
- 2011: "Overload" single by Kendall Morgan (Credits: producer, co-writer)
- 2011: "First Days Of Summer" single (alternate version) by Carter's Chord (Credits: producer)
- 2011: "Again" single (alternate version) by Carter's Chord (Credits: producer)
- 2003: Untitled, Unmastered, and Unemployed by Stir • Capitol Records (Credits: co-writer, guitar)
- 2002–2003: Guitarist for Stir
- 2001: nevertheless EP by Flynova (Credits: guitar, writer on "You're Still Pretending")
- 1999–2000: Guitarist for British rock band, Fono, including world tour with Goo Goo Dolls and Robert Plant
- 1997–1998: bigelectricheart 8-track demos by Elevator to a Penthouse (Credits: co-producer, co-writer)
