= Someplace Closer to Here =

Studio album by Lapush
- Released: June 7, 2005
- Genre: Alternative
- Length: 41:46
- Label: 456, Fontana, Universal
- Producer: Thom Donovan

Lapush chronology
Lapush EP (2003)	Someplace Closer to Here (2005)	Modern Blues (2007)

Singles from Someplace Closer To Here
- 1. "Say Something" Released: May 3, 2005; 2. "Aurora" Released: August 16, 2005; 3. "Quit You Now" Released: December 6, 2005

Someplace Closer To Here is the debut studio album by American rock band Lapush. It was released on June 7, 2005 through 456 and Fontana/Universal.

== Track listing ==
No.	Title	Length
1.	"Sticking Around"	3:55
2.	"Say Something"	4:22
3.	"Aurora"	4:46
4.	"Tout Le Monde"	3:51
5.	"Lucky One"	4:36
6.	"Quit You Now"	4:34
7.	"Through It All"	3:40
8.	"Everything You Asked For"	4:29
9.	"Car Song"	4:06
10.	"Hideaway"	3:28
