= Hollywood Casino Amphitheatre (Maryland Heights, Missouri) =

Outdoor concert venue in Missouri, U.S.

Coordinates: 38.744304°N 90.469502°W

Hollywood Casino Amphitheater
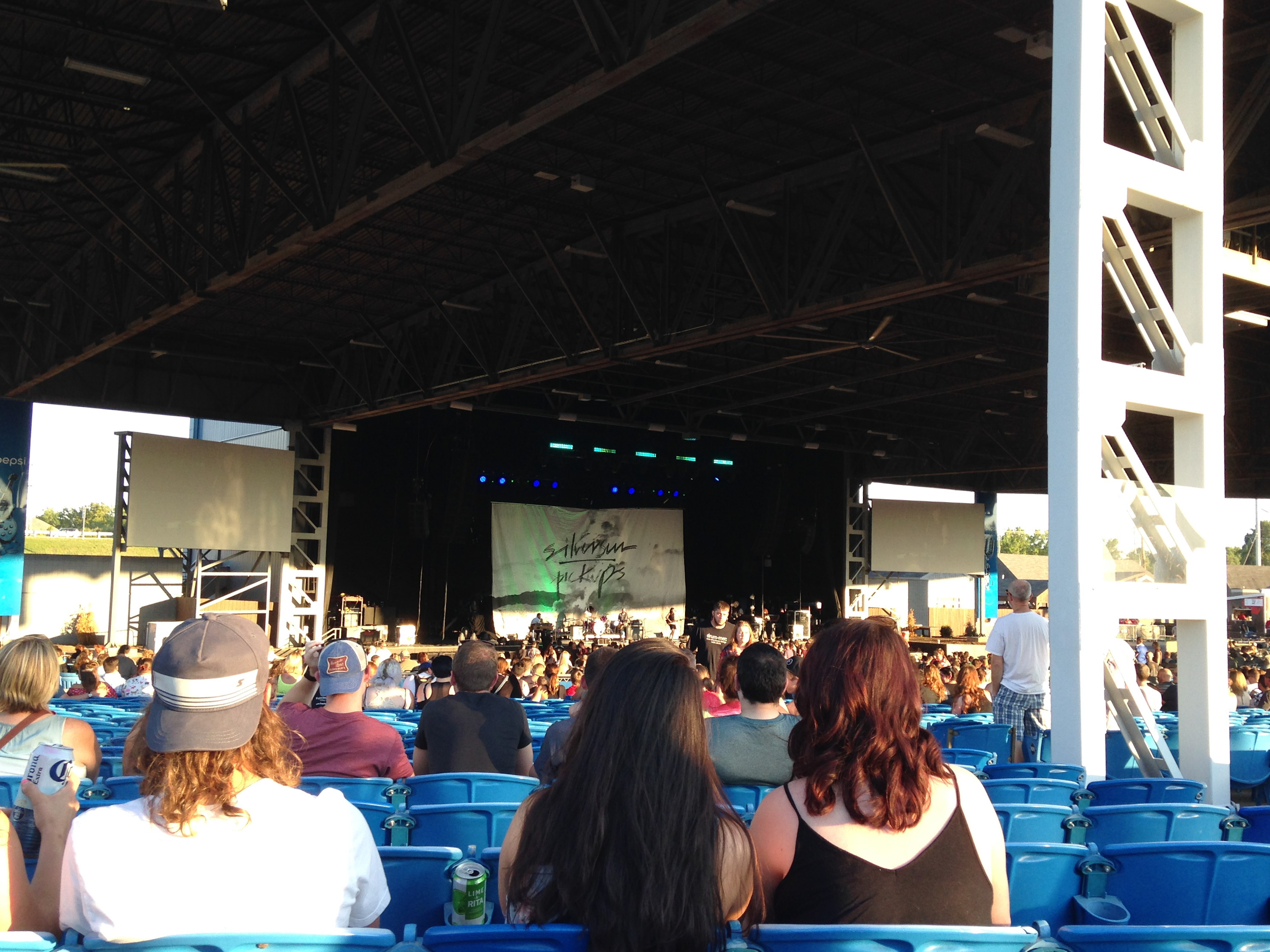
- Venue before a concert
- Interactive map of Hollywood Casino Amphitheater
- Former names: Riverport Amphitheatre (1991–2002); UMB Bank Pavilion (2002–2006); Verizon Wireless Amphitheater (2007–2014)
- Address: 14141 Riverport Dr; Maryland Heights, MO 63043-4807
- Location: Greater St. Louis
- Owner: Live Nation
- Capacity: 20,000
- Public transit: MetroBus

Construction
- Opened: June 14, 1991
- Cost: $12 million ($28.4 million in 2025 dollars)

Hollywood Casino Amphitheater (originally Riverport Amphitheatre and formerly the UMB Bank Pavilion and Verizon Wireless Amphitheater) is an outdoor concert venue in Maryland Heights, Missouri, near St. Louis.

== History ==
The venue was built for approximately $12 million, and opened on June 14, 1991, with a performance by Steve Winwood.

Shortly after opening, the amphitheater became the site of the infamous Riverport Riot, July 2, 1991, during a Guns N' Roses concert, during their Use Your Illusion Tour.

In 1998, the local promoter Contemporary Group, who built the amphitheater, was acquired by SFX. SFX corporate successor Live Nation Entertainment continues to own and operate the venue.

In 2002, UMB Bank acquired the naming rights to the venue for five years. Verizon Wireless then purchased the naming rights in November 2006.

Venue owner Live Nation announced December 17, 2014, that they had signed a multiyear agreement with Hollywood Casino St. Louis (located 2 miles (3.2 km) north), which is owned and operated by Penn National Gaming, to be the amphitheater's title sponsor. The length of the agreement was not disclosed.

== Notable events ==
Guns and Roses Riot - On July 2, 1991 concert at the then-brand new Riverport Amphitheatre (now known as Hollywood Casino Amphitheater) in nearby Maryland Heights, Mo., erupted into a violent and bloody riot, injuring 65 people — including 25 police officers — and resulting in dozens of arrests and hundreds of thousands of dollars in property damage.

On June 9, 2000, the bands REO Speedwagon and Styx performed at the venue together and released Arch Allies Live at Riverport and releasing 2 single-disc versions for Styx and one for REO.

Sting performed during his Symphonicities Tour on June 23, 2010, along with the Royal Philharmonic Orchestra.

On July 23, 2010, Kings of Leon abruptly ended their set, after only three songs, allegedly being pelted with feces by pigeons while onstage. The band gave fans their money back and later announced a makeup show. The new date was scheduled to be on September 25, 2010. Tickets were free for those who attended their last show and were $10.00 for other fans planning on attending.

On May 31, 2022, AJR headlined the amphitheater for their tour supporting their album "OK Orchestra".

On July 30, 2024, Red Hot Chili Peppers concluded their Unlimited Love Tour at the amphitheater.

The amphitheater has played host to many music festivals, including 60's Summer Spectacular, All That! Music and More Festival, Anger Management Tour, Crüe Fest, Crüe Fest 2, Family Values Tour, Farm Aid, H.O.R.D.E. Festival, Honda Civic Tour, Lilith Fair, Lollapalooza, Mayhem Festival, Ozzfest, Pointfest, Projekt Revolution, Uproar Festival and Vans Warped Tour.

== See also ==
- Starlight Theatre
- Live Nation
