= College Life =

American reality television program

College Life is a reality television program on MTV created by David Wexler about the day-to-day lives of eight University of Wisconsin–Madison freshmen, filmed on the campus of the University but without the cooperation thereof (a disclaimer is aired at the beginning of each episode stating that UW does not endorse the program). It debuted on April 13, 2009. Students were given cameras by producers and were told to document their college experiences.

The premiere episode drew a 1.18 rating in the MTV network's target 12–34 demographic, and 1.16 million total viewers. Broadcasting & Cable reported that for a show this cheap to make, this was highly satisfactory to the network.

Future NFL star J. J. Watt was mentioned and made an appearance during the shows first few episode, being briefly involved with cast member Andrea Endries.

== Cast ==
- Alex, 19, (Montgomery, Texas) - Passionate about volunteer work and a music junky.
- Andrea Endries, 19, (Mukwonago, Wisconsin) - Sports fanatic.
- Anna (Wisconsin/Minnesota) (Exclusive online cast member)
- Lindsay (Milwaukee, Wisconsin)
- Kevin, 18, (St. Paul, Minnesota) - Party hard reputation.
- Jordan, 19, (Wheaton, Illinois) - Half Jamaican, half Canadian who grew up in a predominantly white suburb.
- Josh (Mukwonago, Wisconsin) (Sophomore)
- Dan (Brattleboro, Vermont) (Exclusive online cast member)

Note: Ages are at the time of filming.
