= Greenwheel =

American alternative rock band

- Origin: St. Charles, Missouri
- Genres: Alternative rock
- Years active: 2000–2006
- Labels: Unsigned currently; formerly Island Records
- Members: Ryan Jordan (vocals, guitar); Brandon Armstrong (bass); Andrew Dwiggins (guitar); Drew Bailey (drums)
- Past members: Marc Wanninger (guitar); Douglas Randall (drums)

Greenwheel was an American alternative rock band formed by friends Ryan Jordan, Brandon Armstrong, Andrew Dwiggins, Douglas Randall, and Marc Wanninger in November 1998. The band was formed in St. Charles, Missouri, in a local record shop. This group of high school bandmates were originally called Hindsight before changing their name to Soma Holiday. They released a self-titled album that same year which garnered them local attention. After this brief period, they went underground, performing only occasionally.

== Major label success ==
One night at a local club, vocalist Ryan Jordan passed a copy of their self-produced CD to producer Malcolm Springer. Springer was impressed by the album and took the band to Memphis, Tennessee, for pre-production work on a four-track demo CD that he later recorded with the band in Nashville, Tennessee. In 2000, the group renamed themselves Greenwheel and began performing at various venues in New York City in support of the new Springer-produced demo CD. Island Records signed Greenwheel as a result of the demo and their performances in New York.

Greenwheel returned to Nashville, and they completed recording on their major-label debut album in 2001. The debut album, Soma Holiday, was released in May 2002. This record was also recorded and produced by engineer Malcolm Springer. Their track "Shelter" earned a spot on the soundtrack albums More Fast and Furious: Music from and Inspired by the Motion Picture The Fast and the Furious and Music from and Inspired by Spider-Man.

In 2001, Greenwheel began an aggressive touring schedule. They spent the summer of 2001 on tour with Flickerstick and Rubyhorse. In June and July 2002, Greenwheel played 10 shows alongside Injected and Default. The band opened 20 shows for Our Lady Peace in July and August 2002. Following the tour with Our Lady Peace, Greenwheel toured as the opening act for Blindside and Hoobastank.

Melissa Etheridge covered Greenwheel's "Breathe", and the song was selected as the first single off her 2004 release, Lucky. Their single "Breathe" earned regular airplay on alternative radio stations around the country, and the video for "Breathe" could be seen on MTV2. Etheridge's cover version of "Breathe" went on to reach the Top 10 on the radio charts in three different formats, as well as earn a Grammy Award nomination for the Greenwheel cover.

== Post–Island Records work ==
Greenwheel worked with producer Jim Wirt in early 2004 on 16 new songs for a second full-length release on Island Records. The tentative name of the record was Electric Blanket, but the album was never released since the band parted ways with Island Records in 2004. Greenwheel was not permitted to release tracks from the Electric Blanket sessions for sale, but the band made the unreleased tracks available through a media player on their official website. The band expressed interest at their shows that fans distribute the CD among themselves if they don't have a copy, and the band provided burned copies of the disc for free at their shows.

After parting ways with Island, the band remixed and remastered their first independent self-titled release, and they re-released it to the public in 2005. While it shared the same name as their first major-label release, it consisted of a completely different track lineup (with the exception of "Drowning Man" and "Louder Than Words," which appear on both releases.)

In addition to parting ways with Island, the band also parted ways with long-time drummer Doug Randall, and Drew Bailey joined the band to fill the vacant spot behind the drum kit. Long-time guitarist Marc Wanninger also departed the band, resulting in the current four-member lineup.

On March 28, 2006, the band released a brand new five-song EP entitled Bridges For Burning. The new release was accompanied by Greenwheel's five-month-long "Bridges for Burning Tour".

In 2007, the band announced that they were forming a new band named Go Van Gogh, and in March of that year they released the new album Ruby and the Starlight Ballroom. Although both Greenwheel and Go Van Gogh had the same band members, the band members insisted the two bands would coexist as separate entities with different musical styles. In August 2008 both Greenwheel and Go Van Gogh played together at the i-Fest concert at the Family Arena in St. Charles, Missouri. Lead singer Ryan Jordan described the unique situation, "This is going to be my first time opening for myself. That's going to be fun. It's two different characters. With Go Van Gogh, it's us in ties and vests. In Greenwheel, it's T-shirts and jeans."

Ryan Jordan and Andrew Dwiggins have been playing in a cover band called "The Wyld Stallyns", playing mostly bars in their local Missouri.

== Discography ==
Year	Title	Type	Label
2000	Soma Holiday	full-length demo CD	none/independent
2001	Hello	EP	Island Records
2002	Shelter	CD single	Island Records
2002	Shelter	3" CD single	Island Records
2002	Soma Holiday	full-length CD	Island Records
2002	Soma Holiday	full-length JAP CD (includes "Flood" bonus track)	Island Records
2002	Breathe	CD single	Island Records
2004	Electric Blanket	full-length CD (never officially released)	Island Records
2005	Soma Holiday	full-length CD (re-release of 2000 indie version)	none/independent
2006	Bridges for Burning	EP	none/independent
