= Welcome to Rockville =

Annual rock music festival in Florida

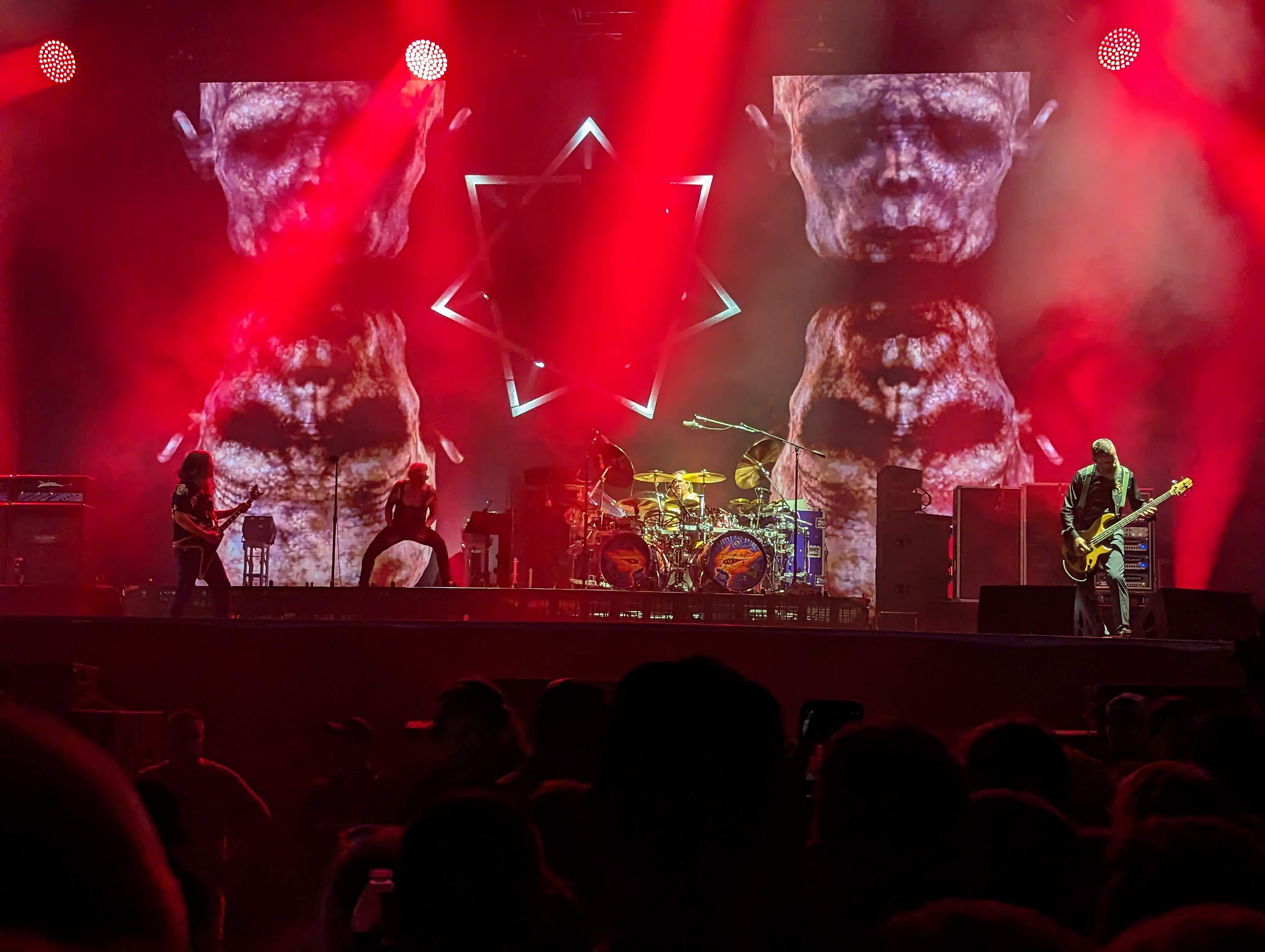
- Tool performing at Welcome to Rockville 2023
- Genre: Heavy metal, hard rock, alternative rock, punk
- Dates: May 8, 2011; April 29, 2012; April 27–28, 2013; April 26–27, 2014; April 25–26, 2015; April 30–May 1, 2016; April 29–30, 2017; April 27–29, 2018; May 3–5, 2019; November 11–14, 2021; May 19–22, 2022; May 18–21, 2023; May 9–12, 2024; May 15–18, 2025; May 7–10, 2026
- Locations: Daytona Beach, Florida (2020–present); Jacksonville, Florida (2011–2019)
- Years active: 2011–2019, 2021–present
- Website: WelcomeToRockville.com

Welcome to Rockville is a four-day rock/heavy metal event held annually at the Daytona International Speedway in Daytona Beach, Florida.

== History ==
The inaugural Welcome to Rockville was held on Mother's Day, May 8, 2011, at Metropolitan Park in Jacksonville, Florida. Headlined by Godsmack and hosted by Mistress Juliya, the festival ran from 11 AM to 10 PM due to local noise ordinances.

A second festival was held on Sunday, April 29, 2012, which featured Jacksonville natives Shinedown headlining the festival along with Korn.

The Welcome to Rockville festival was expanded from a one-day event to a two-day event in 2013, and Jacksonville native band Lynyrd Skynyrd headlined with Alice in Chains. The 2013 festival started a minor controversy about the enforcement of a noise ordinance, which was waived for the festival.

The headlining bands of the 2014 festival were Avenged Sevenfold and Korn.

The headlining bands of the 2015 festival were Korn and Slipknot.

Disturbed and Rob Zombie headlined at Welcome to Rockville 2016.

Soundgarden and Def Leppard headlined Welcome to Rockville 2017.

In 2018, Welcome to Rockville expanded to a three-day event (Friday-Sunday). The festival featured headliners Ozzy Osbourne, Avenged Sevenfold, and the Foo Fighters.

Korn, Rob Zombie, and Tool headlined Welcome to Rockville in 2019. In July, Danny Wimmer Presents announced the festival's move to Daytona Beach, Florida.

In March 2020, it was announced that the festival would be canceled due to the COVID-19 pandemic but would return in 2021.

Welcome to Rockville returned in 2021, relocating to Daytona Beach and drawing a record-breaking 161,000 attendees over four days (Nov 11–14). Headlined by Metallica for two nights, along with Slipknot and Disturbed, the festival was hailed as the largest rock event in the US that year. Online viewership also surged, with 1.2 million people tuning in to select performances on Twitch. The success fueled the announcement of a return in May 2022.

Welcome to Rockville 2022 took place from May 19–22, featuring a lineup that included Kiss, Korn, Guns N' Roses, and the Foo Fighters. While Kiss headlined on Thursday, severe weather on Friday and Saturday forced the cancellation of several acts, including Korn and Guns N' Roses. The death of drummer Taylor Hawkins led to the Foo Fighters' cancellation, but Nine Inch Nails stepped in to perform on Sunday.

The 2023 edition of Welcome to Rockville was held in May, featuring Slipknot, Avenged Sevenfold, Pantera, and Tool as headliners.

The 13th installment of Welcome to Rockville, held in 2024, featured Mötley Crüe, Limp Bizkit, Foo Fighters, and Slipknot as its headliners.

Headlining the 2025 Welcome to Rockville were the performances of Shinedown, Green Day, Linkin Park, and Korn.

Welcome to Rockville took place in 2026 from May 7–10 and included headliners Guns N' Roses, Foo Fighters, Bring Me The Horizon, and My Chemical Romance.

== Estimated yearly attendance ==
- 2011 – 10,000 sold-out event
- 2012 – 11,000 sold-out event
- 2013 – 25,000 (two-day total)
- 2014 – 40,000 (two-day total) sold-out event
- 2015 – 50,000 (two-day total) sold-out event
- 2016 – 50,000 (two-day total) sold-out event
- 2017 – 75,000 (two-day total)
- 2018 – 90,000 (three-day total) sold-out event
- 2019 – 99,000 (three-day total) sold-out event
- 2021 – 161,000 (four-day total)
- 2022 – 140,000 (four-day total)
- 2023 – 170,000 (four-day total)
- 2024 – 200,000 (four-day total)
- 2025 – 230,000 (four-day total)
- 2026 – 240,000 (four-day total)

== Lineup ==
=== 2011 ===
Main Stage:

- Godsmack
- Stone Sour
- Seether
- Theory of a Deadman
- Puddle of Mudd
- Skillet
- Halestorm
- Son of a Bad Man

Budweiser Stage:

- Cold
- My Darkest Days
- Cavo
- Rev Theory
- Art of Dying
- Down Theory
- Bleeding in Stereo

Jägermeister Stage:

- Red Jumpsuit Apparatus
- Revis
- Fit for Rivals
- Six Shot Revival
- Mindslip
- Viktr
- Broken Trust
- Manna Zen
- Efen
- In Whispers

=== 2012 ===
Main Stage 1:

- Korn
- Evanesence
- Halestorm
- Trivium
- Adelitas Way
- Otherwise
- Soulswitch

Main Stage 2:

- Shinedown
- Five Finger Death Punch
- P.O.D.
- Lacuna Coil
- Art of Dying
- Eye Empire

=== 2013 ===
Day one (Saturday, April 27)

Monster Energy Stage East:

- Alice in Chains
- Stone Sour
- Papa Roach
- Halestorm
- All That Remains
- Pop Evil

Monster Energy Stage West:

- Limp Bizkit
- Three Days Grace
- Bullet for My Valentine
- Asking Alexandria
- In This Moment
- Young Guns

Emerging Artist Stage:

- Escape the Fate
- Otherwise
- Whitechapel
- Gemini Syndrome
- Hell or High Water
- Rockville Rumble Winner

Jaxlive Stage:

- Rockville Rumble Winner
- Edens Fill
- Rockville Rumble Winner
- Rockville Rumble Winner
- Stars in Stereo
- MonstrO
- Rockville Rumble Winner

Day two (Sunday, April 28)

Monster Energy Stage East:

- Lynyrd Skynyrd
- 3 Doors Down
- Skillet
- Filter
- Saving Abel
- Red

Monster Energy Stage West:

- Shinedown
- Buckcherry
- Hollywood Undead
- Steel Panther
- Nonpoint
- Farewell 2 Fear

Emerging Artist Stage:

- Nothing More
- Device
- Motionless in White
- Saliva
- Girl On Fire
- Soulswitch
- Nebraska Bricks

Jaxlive Stage:

- Rockville Rumble Winner
- Rockville Rumble Winner
- Rockville Rumble Winner
- Rockville Rumble Winner
- The Apprehended
- (N)ception

=== 2014 ===
Day one (Saturday, April 26)

Monster Energy West Stage:

- Avenged Sevenfold
- A Day to Remember
- Chevelle
- Hellyeah
- Adelitas Way
- Rev Theory
- Digital Summer

Monster Energy East Stage:

- The Cult
- Volbeat
- Alter Bridge
- Chiodos
- Middle Class Rut
- Gemini Syndrome

Jägermeister stage:

- We Came as Romans
- Memphis May Fire
- Smile Empty Soul
- Evergreen Terrace
- Silvertung
- World Gone

Ernie Ball Stage:

- Fozzy
- Devour the Day
- We as Human
- Monster Truck
- Cathercist

Day two (Sunday, April 27)

Monster Energy West Stage:

- Korn
- Five Finger Death Punch
- Seether
- Sick Puppies
- Within Reason

Monster Energy East Stage:

- Rob Zombie
- Staind
- Theory of a Deadman
- Black Stone Cherry
- The Pretty Reckless

Jägermeister stage:

- Motionless in White
- Emmure
- Lacuna Coil
- Kyng
- Ghost of War

Ernie Ball Stage:

- Trivium
- Butcher Babies
- Nothing More
- Twelve Foot Ninja

=== 2015 ===
April 24 pre-party (Friday night)

Jacksonville Landing Stage:

- Hollywood Undead
- Nonpoint
- Avatar
- 36 Crazyfists
- World Gone
- Scare Don't Fear

Day one (Saturday, April 25)

Monster Energy Main Stage:

- Korn
- Slayer
- Halestorm
- Of Mice & Men
- Hollywood Undead
- Stars in Stereo

Jack Daniel's Met Park Main Stage:

- Marilyn Manson
- Ministry
- Queensrÿche
- Scott Weiland and the Wildabouts
- Nonpoint
- Like a Storm

ReverbNation Stage:

- Suicidal Tendencies
- Testament
- Exodus
- Fozzy
- Sons of Texas
- Red Sun Rising

Jägermeister Stage:

- The Devil Wears Prada
- Periphery
- Beartooth
- Upon a Burning Body
- Sangre
- World Gone

Day two (Sunday, April 26)

Monster Energy Main Stage:

- Slipknot
- Papa Roach
- The Pretty Reckless
- In This Moment
- We Are Harlot

Jack Daniels Met Park Main Stage:

- Godsmack
- Slash featuring Myles Kennedy and The Conspirators
- Breaking Benjamin
- Motionless in White
- Young Guns
- '68

ReverbNation Stage:

- All That Remains
- Hatebreed
- Butcher Babies
- Starset
- ReverbNation Band
- Shattered Sun

Jägermeister Stage:

- In Flames
- Tremonti
- Vamps
- Islander
- From Ashes to New

=== 2016 ===
Day one (Saturday, April 30)

Monster Energy Righty Stage:

- Shinedown
- Bring Me the Horizon
- Pennywise
- Bullet for My Valentine
- Trivium
- Wilson

Monster Energy Lefty Stage:

- Disturbed
- Sixx:A.M.
- Hellyeah
- Asking Alexandria
- Red Sun Rising
- Monster Truck

Metropolitan Stage:

- 3 Doors Down
- Collective Soul
- Pop Evil
- Candlebox
- Filter
- Lacey Sturm

River Stage:

- Escape the Fate
- Crown the Empire
- Enter Shikari
- Miss May I
- Cane Hill
- Big Jesus

Day two (Sunday, May 1)

Monster Energy Righty Stage:

- Rob Zombie
- A Day to Remember
- Cypress Hill
- P.O.D.
- Sick Puppies
- From Ashes to New

Monster Energy Lefty Stage:

- ZZ Top (cancelled)
- Megadeth
- Sevendust
- Yelawolf
- Texas Hippie Coalition
- Glorious Sons

Metropolitan Stage:

- Five Finger Death Punch
- Lamb of God
- Ghost
- We Came as Romans
- Memphis May Fire
- Avatar

River Stage:

- Anthrax
- Clutch
- Parkway Drive
- Issues
- Beartooth

=== 2017 ===
Day one (Saturday, April 29)

Monster Energy Stage:

- Soundgarden
- The Offspring
- Coheed and Cambria
- Eagles of Death Metal
- All That Remains
- I Prevail
- Goodbye June

Metropolitan Stage:

- A Perfect Circle
- Mastodon
- The Pretty Reckless
- Highly Suspect
- Starset
- Dinosaur Pile-Up
- Badflower

River Stage:

- Pierce the Veil
- In Flames
- Frank Carter & The Rattlesnakes
- Volumes
- Royal Republic
- As Lions
- The Charm The Fury

Day two (Sunday, April 30)

Monster Energy Stage:

- Def Leppard
- Papa Roach
- Three Days Grace
- Of Mice & Men
- The Dillinger Escape Plan
- Nothing More
- Rival Sons

Metropolitan Stage:

- Chevelle
- Seether
- Alter Bridge
- In This Moment
- Motionless in White
- Beartooth
- Kyng

River Stage:

- Amon Amarth
- Gojira
- Every Time I Die
- Attila
- Sylar
- Fire from the Gods
- Cover Your Tracks

=== 2018 ===
Day one (Friday, April 27)

Monster Energy Stage:

- Ozzy Osbourne (ft. Zakk Wylde)
- Five Finger Death Punch
- The Used
- Underoath
- Texas Hippie Coalition
- MDFK

Metropolitan Stage:

- Godsmack
- Halestorm
- Parkway Drive
- Trivium
- '68
- Palisades

River Stage:

- Atreyu
- Power Trip
- Toothgrinder
- Bad Wolves
- Them Evils

Day two (Saturday, April 28)

Monster Energy Stage:

- Avenged Sevenfold
- Breaking Benjamin
- Hollywood Undead
- Black Veil Brides
- Sevendust
- Avatar
- Tyler Bryant & the Shakedown

Metropolitan Stage:

- Stone Sour
- Stone Temple Pilots
- Asking Alexandria
- Pop Evil
- Red Sun Rising
- Joyous Wolf

River Stage:

- Andrew W.K.
- Butcher Babies
- Stick to Your Guns
- Palaye Royale
- He Is Legend
- The Wild!
- Yashira

Day three (Sunday, April 29)

Monster Energy Stage:

- Foo Fighters
- Billy Idol
- Bullet for My Valentine
- Greta Van Fleet
- Red Fang
- The Bronx

Metropolitan Stage:

- Queens of the Stone Age
- Clutch
- Thrice
- Quicksand
- The Sword
- Fireball Ministry

River Stage:

- Baroness
- Wolf Alice
- Turnstile
- The Fever 333
- Spirit Animal

=== 2019 ===
Day one (Friday, May 3)

Monster Energy Stage:

- Korn
- Chevelle
- Flogging Molly
- Tom Morello
- Hyro the Hero
- Hands Like Houses
- Dirty Honey

Metropolitan Stage:

- Evanescence
- The Crystal Method
- Killswitch Engage
- Beartooth
- Light the Torch
- Amigo the Devil

River Stage:

- Circa Survive
- Mark Lanegan Band
- Black Pistol Fire
- Wilson
- Demob Happy
- Cleopatrick

Day two (Saturday, May 4)

Monster Energy Stage:

- Rob Zombie
- Shinedown
- In This Moment
- Black Label Society
- The Damned Things
- Dead Girls Academy

Metropolitan Stage:

- Judas Priest
- The Cult
- Skillet
- Tremonti
- Badflower
- Crobot

River Stage:

- Yelawolf
- Zeal and Ardor
- Wage War
- Movements
- Boston Manor

Day three (Sunday, May 5)

Monster Energy Stage:

- Tool
- Bring Me the Horizon
- The Interrupters
- Fever 333
- Yungblud
- The Glorious Sons
- Hyde

Metropolitan Stage:

- Incubus
- Papa Roach
- The Struts
- Reignwolf
- Dorothy
- The Dirty Nil

River Stage:

- Meshuggah
- Architects
- grandson
- While She Sleeps
- SHVPES

=== 2021 ===
Day one (Thursday, November 11)

Space Zebra Stage:

- Cypress Hill
- Grandson
- Dead Sara
- Spiritbox
- Dana Dentata

Octane Stage:

- Slipknot
- A Day to Remember
- Gojira
- Dorothy
- Teenage Wrist
- Siiickbrain

Rockvillian Stage:

- Brass Against
- NASCAR Aloe
- Jeris Johnson
- Blame My Youth
- Contracult Collective

Twitch Stage:

- Them Evils
- Revision, Revised
- The Alpha Complex
- A War Within
- Scarlett O'hara
- Dead Reckoning
- Shadow the Earth
- As You Were

Day two (Friday, November 12)

Space Zebra Stage:

- Metallica
- Social Distortion
- Pennywise
- Ice Nine Kills
- Ayron Jones
- Austin Meade

Octane Stage:

- Rob Zombie
- Chevelle
- Beartooth
- Starset
- Zero 9:36
- Whit3 Collr

Rockvillian Stage:

- Wage War
- Butcher Babies
- Amigo the Devil
- Bad Omens
- Tallah
- Eva Under Fire

Twitch Stage:

- Zero 9:36
- Whit3 Collr
- Divided Truth
- ReBirth
- Tragic
- VENTRUSS
- The Coursing
- As You Were

Day three (Saturday, November 13)

Space Zebra Stage:

- Staind
- The Offspring
- Badflower
- Fever 333
- Dead Poet Society
- Brkn Love

Octane Stage:

- Disturbed
- Lamb of God
- Asking Alexandria
- Atreyu
- Sick Puppies
- Fame on Fire

Rockvillian Stage:

- Gwar
- Crown the Empire
- 3Teeth
- All Good Things
- Joyous Wolf
- Reach NYC

Twitch Stage:

- Magnolia Bayou
- Actus Reus
- Widow7
- Timmy Taylor
- NoSelf
- Troy
- Higher Ground
- As You Were

Day four (Sunday, November 14)

Space Zebra Stage:

- Metallica
- Mudvayne
- Falling in Reverse
- Sleeping with Sirens
- Alien Weaponry
- Goodbye June

Octane Stage:

- Lynyrd Skynyrd
- Mastodon
- Anthrax
- Dance Gavin Dance
- Fire from the Gods
- Survive the Sun

Rockvillian Stage:

- Code Orange
- Jelly Roll
- The Warning
- Avoid
- Hero the Band
- As You Were

Twitch Stage:

- Lone Wolf
- The Dev
- Imperial Tide
- Lines of Loyalty

=== 2022 ===
Day one (Thursday, May 19)

Space Zebra Stage:

- Kiss
- Papa Roach
- Black Label Society
- Mammoth WVH
- Fuel
- Plush

Octane Stage:

- Five Finger Death Punch
- In This Moment
- Clutch
- Bad Wolves
- Oxymorrons
- Tetrarch
- Widow7

Rockvillian Stage:

- Down
- Ill Niño
- Shaman's Harvest
- Gemini Syndrome
- Contracult Collective

DWPresents Stage:

- The Sword
- Bad Omens
- Redlight King
- Devil's Cut
- Post Profit
- As You Were

Day two (Friday, May 20)

Space Zebra Stage:

- Korn (cancelled)
- Megadeth (cancelled)
- Ministry (set cut short)
- Baroness
- Blacktop Mojo
- Diamante

Octane Stage:

- Breaking Benjamin (cancelled)
- Seether
- Skillet (cancelled)
- Sevendust
- Ded
- Giovannie and the Hired Guns

Rockvillian Stage:

- Underoath (cancelled)
- RED (set cut short)
- Tyler Bryant & the Shakedown
- Stick to Your Guns
- Archetypes Collide

DWPresents Stage:

- We Came as Romans
- Whitechapel
- Mike's Dead
- Extinction A.D.
- Young Other
- As You Were

Day three (Saturday, May 21)

Space Zebra Stage:

- Guns N' Roses (cancelled)
- Rise Against (cancelled)
- Jerry Cantrell (set cut short)
- Dirty Honey (cancelled)
- Saint Asonia (set cut short)
- Against the Current

Octane Stage:

- Shinedown (set cut short)
- Bush (cancelled)
- Nothing More
- Alexisonfire (cancelled)
- The Violent
- John Harvie

Rockvillian Stage:

- In Flames (set cut short)
- John 5 (set cut short)
- Agnostic Front
- S8nt Elektric
- Afterlife

DWPresents Stage:

- Crown the Empire
- The Word Alive
- Stitched Up Heart
- A River Runs Thru It
- As You Were

Day four (Sunday, May 22)

Space Zebra Stage:

- Nine Inch Nails (replaced the Foo Fighters)
- Porno for Pyros (replaced Jane's Addiction)
- The Pretty Reckless
- Poppy
- Lilith Czar
- Superbloom

Octane Stage:

- The Smashing Pumpkins
- Halestorm
- The Struts
- Spiritbox
- Radkey

Rockvillian Stage:

- The Hu
- Bones UK
- Motor Sister
- Aeir
- The Mysterines

DWPresents Stage:

- Escape the Fate
- Lacey Sturm
- Crobot
- The Dead Deads
- NVRLESS
- As You Were

=== 2023 ===
Day one (Thursday, May 18)

- Slipknot
- Rob Zombie
- The Cult (replaced Queens of the Stone Age)
- Puscifer
- Trivium (cancelled)
- Bullet for My Valentine (set cut short)
- Suicidal Tendencies
- Avatar (set cut short)
- Black Stone Cherry
- Converge
- Band-Maid
- Austin Meade
- Bloodywood
- Stray from the Path (cancelled)
- Brutus
- Rain City Drive
- Malevolence
- Vended
- Rivals
- Wargasm
- Nevertel
- Widow7
- Conquer Divide
- Budderside

Day two (Friday, May 19)

- Avenged Sevenfold
- Evanescence
- Hardy
- I Prevail
- Motionless in White
- Sleeping with Sirens
- Badflower
- Ayron Jones
- Memphis May Fire
- From Ashes to New
- Born of Osiris
- The Warning
- Mothica
- Des Rocs
- Varials
- Tallah
- Tigercub
- Slay Squad
- Ryan Oakes
- Tuk Smith and The Restless Hearts
- Bastardane
- OTTTO
- Until I Die
- As You Were

Day three (Saturday, May 20)

- Pantera
- Godsmack
- Alice Cooper
- Chevelle
- Alter Bridge (cancelled)
- Jason Bonham's Led Zeppelin Evening
- Knocked Loose
- Rival Sons
- Yelawolf Presents: Sometimes Y
- Pop Evil
- Suicide Silence
- Sepultura
- The Bronx
- Poorstacy
- Ho99o9
- Zero 9:36
- Maylene and the Sons of Disaster
- Dayseeker
- Dead Poet Society (cancelled)
- Kreator
- The Violent
- Starcrawler
- Hammerhedd

Day four (Sunday, May 21)

- Tool
- Deftones
- Incubus
- The Mars Volta
- Coheed & Cambria
- Pennywise
- Ghostemane
- Grandson
- Sueco
- Filter
- Deafheaven
- Anti-Flag
- Senses Fail
- New Years Day
- Nothing,Nowhere
- Angel Dust
- Nova Twins
- Point North
- Bob Vylan
- Capital Theatre
- Uncured
- Reddstar

=== 2024 ===
Day one (Thursday, May 9)

Apex Stage

- Mötley Crüe
- Judas Priest
- Anthrax
- Dirty Honey
- Amigo the Devil
- Cold
- Point North

Octane Drift Stage

- Disturbed
- Mudvayne
- Skillet
- Flyleaf
- Saliva
- Orgy
- Imperial Tide

Vortex Stage

- Kerry King
- Biohazard
- Lacuna Coil
- Shadows Fall
- Stabbing Westward
- Gideon
- Thrown
- Fuming Mouth

Inferno Stage

- Machine Head
- August Burns Red
- Soulfly
- Bury Tomorrow
- New Years Day
- Spite
- Bodysnatcher
- Until I Wake

Garage Stage

- Insane Clown Posse
- Bad Wolves
- Miss May I
- Fleshwater
- Moon Fever
- TX2

Day two (Friday, May 10)

Apex Stage

- Limp Bizkit
- Falling In Reverse
- In This Moment
- Starset
- Nonpoint
- Flat Black
- Powerman 5000

Octane Drift Stage

- Jelly Roll
- The Offspring
- Koe Wetzel
- Living Colour
- Kim Dracula
- Sleep Theory
- Alien Ant Farm

Vortex Stage

- Mr. Bungle
- Electric Callboy
- Nitzer Ebb
- Catch Your Breath
- Lø Spirit
- Mike's Dead

Inferno Stage

- In Flames
- Slaughter to Prevail
- Kittie
- Mushroomhead
- I See Stars
- Imminence
- Dying Wish

Garage Stage

- Tech N9ne
- The Amity Affliction
- Currents
- Kublai Khan TX
- Harms Way
- Rain City Drive
- Citizen Soldier

Day three (Saturday, May 11)

Apex Stage

- Foo Fighters
- Greta Van Fleet
- Primus
- Mammoth WVH
- Reignwolf
- Nova Twins
- Destroy Boys

Octane Drift Stage

- Queens of the Stone Age
- A Day to Remember
- Stone Temple Pilots
- Royal Blood
- The Struts
- Taipei Houston

Vortex Stage

- Cypress Hill
- L7
- Helmet
- Frank Carter and the Rattlesnakes
- Fire From the Gods
- Hed PE
- Calva Louise
- Vukovi

Inferno Stage

- Clutch
- Baroness
- All Them Witches
- Red Fang
- Austin Meade
- Crobot
- Tim Montana
- Hotbox

Garage Stage

- Code Orange
- Drain
- Terror
- Stick to Your Guns
- The Chisel
- Bad Nerves
- Afterlife

Day four (Sunday, May 12)

Apex Stage

- Slipknot
- Breaking Benjamin
- Architects
- Wage War
- P.O.D.
- Taproot
- Adema

Octane Drift Stage

- Evanescence
- Bad Omens
- Theory of a Deadman
- Sebastian Bach
- Drowning Pool
- Nita Strauss
- TRUSTcompany

Vortex Stage

- Sum 41
- Atreyu
- The Chats
- Magnolia Park
- Bob Vylan
- Militarie Gun
- Gel
- Stratejacket

Inferno Stage

- Black Veil Brides
- Movements
- Enter Shikari
- SiM
- Dead Poet Society
- Plush
- Return to Dust
- Kill the Robot

Garage Stage

- Polyphia
- The Ghost Inside
- Of Mice & Men
- Fear Factory
- While She Sleeps
- Eva Under Fire
- Blind Channel
- Another Day Dawns

=== 2025 ===
Day one (Thursday, May 15)

Apex Stage

- Shinedown
- Three Days Grace
- The Pretty Reckless
- Theory of a Deadman
- Blue October
- Evans Blue
- Royale Lynn

Octane Stage

- Rob Zombie
- Halestorm
- Trivium
- Crossfade
- Finger Eleven
- Saving Abel
- Smile Empty Soul

Vortex Stage

- Bullet For My Valentine
- Asking Alexandria
- We Came As Romans
- From Ashes To New
- Fit For A King
- Until I Wake
- Of Virtue
- The Pretty Wild

Inferno Stage

- Body Count
- Arch Enemy
- Gwar
- Exodus
- The Acacia Strain
- Shadow of Intent
- Frozen Soul
- Gates to Hell

Garage Stage

- The Dillinger Escape Plan
- Quicksand
- Health
- Converge
- Full of Hell
- Harms Way
- Candy
- Big Ass Truck

Day two (Friday, May 16)

Apex Stage

- Green Day
- Social Distortion
- Jimmy Eat World
- New Found Glory
- Bowling For Soup
- Lit
- Red Jumpsuit Apparatus

Octane Stage

- Good Charlotte
- Sublime
- Bush
- Candlebox
- Everclear
- Dorothy
- Dexter & the Moonrocks

Vortex Stage

- Knocked Loose
- Kublai Khan tx
- Incendiary
- Erra
- Invent Animate
- Boundaries
- One Step Closer
- Left to Suffer

Inferno Stage

- Killswitch Engage
- Jinjer
- August Burns Red
- Miss May I
- It Dies Today
- Butcher Babies
- Bleed From Within
- As You Were

Garage Stage

- Underoath
- Saosin
- Silverstein
- The Devil Wears Prada
- Silent Planet
- Scary Kids Scaring Kids
- Alesana
- I Set My Friends On Fire

Day three (Saturday, May 17)

Apex Stage

- Linkin Park
- Incubus
- Beartooth
- Taking Back Sunday
- P.O.D.
- Hoobastank
- Sleep Theory

Octane Stage

- Pierce The Veil
- I Prevail
- Hollywood Undead
- Sleeping With Sirens
- Of Mice & Men
- Escape The Fate
- Liliac

Vortex Stage

- Mastodon
- Acid Bath
- Obituary
- Municipal Waste
- Nails
- Havok
- Dead Heat
- Chained Saint

Inferno Stage

- Dayseeker
- Bilmuri
- The Plot in You
- Set it Off
- Real Friends
- The Funeral Portrait
- Nerv
- Nevertel

Garage Stage

- White Chapel
- All Shall Perish
- Attila
- After The Burial
- Emmure
- Brand of Sacrifice
- Upon A Burning Body
- Angelmaker

Day four (Sunday, May 18)

Apex Stage

- Korn
- Marilyn Manson
- Chevelle
- Daughtry
- Filter
- Snot
- The Union Underground

Octane Stage

- Bad Omens
- Mudvayne
- Motionless in White
- Sevendust
- Chimaira
- Dry Kill Logic
- Return to Dust

Vortex Stage

- Insane Clown Posse
- Testament
- The Black Dahlia Murder
- Seven Hours After Violet
- Fit For An Autopsy
- Gatecreeper
- Sanguisugabogg
- Allt

Inferno Stage

- Chiodos
- Hawthorne Heights
- Memphis May Fire
- Blessthefall
- ATTACK ATTACK!
- A Skylit Drive
- Caskets
- Wind Walkers

Garage Stage

- Power Trip
- Deafheaven
- Sunami
- Pain of Truth
- 200 Stab Wounds
- Peeling Flesh
- Bodybox
- Mugshot
