= Carolina Rebellion =

Hard rock and heavy metal music festival

- Genre: Hard rock; heavy metal; alternative rock; rap rock
- Dates: First weekend in May
- Locations: Charlotte, North Carolina (2011); Rockingham, North Carolina (2012); Concord, North Carolina (2013–2018)
- Years active: 2011–2018
- Founders: AEG Live; Danny Wimmer Presents; Monster Energy; Right Arm Entertainment
- Website: www.carolinarebellion.com

Carolina Rebellion was a rock festival that took place annually in North Carolina. It was produced by AEG Live and Danny Wimmer Presents. The inaugural festival took place at the Metrolina Expo in Charlotte, North Carolina. The second year of the festival it was relocated to Rockingham Speedway in Rockingham, North Carolina. The festival took place at Rock City Campgrounds at Charlotte Motor Speedway in Concord, North Carolina in 2013 and the promoters aimed to make that the permanent venue. In 2013, Carolina Rebellion expanded to two days and to three days in 2016. Due to a split between DWP and AEG Live, a new festival, Epicenter, was announced on November 28, 2018, to be the replacement for Carolina Rebellion, scheduled to start in 2019.

== 2011 ==
May 7

Monster Carolina Stage

- Avenged Sevenfold (headliner)
- Three Days Grace
- Seether
- Bullet for My Valentine
- Skillet
- Halestorm
- Cavo

Monster Rebellion Stage

- Godsmack (co-headliner)
- Stone Sour
- Theory of a Deadman
- Alter Bridge
- Hinder
- Saving Abel
- My Darkest Days

Jägermeister stage

- Rev Theory
- Black Stone Cherry
- Pop Evil
- Art of Dying
- Drop D

== 2012 ==
May 5

Monster Carolina Stage

- Shinedown (headliner)
- Evanescence
- Five Finger Death Punch
- Chevelle
- Halestorm
- Paper Tongues

Monster Rebellion Stage

- Korn (co-headliner)
- Staind
- Slash featuring Myles Kennedy & The Conspirators
- Volbeat
- Adelitas Way
- Weaving the Fate

Jägermeister Stage

- P.O.D.
- Redlight King
- Red
- New Medicine
- Ghosts of August

== 2013 ==
Day 1, Saturday May 4

Monster Energy Carolina Stage

- Alice in Chains (headliner)
- Deftones
- Papa Roach
- Halestorm
- In This Moment
- Otherwise

Monster Energy Rebellion Stage

- Limp Bizkit (co-headliner)
- Three Days Grace
- Bullet for My Valentine
- Asking Alexandria
- Sick Puppies
- Young Guns

Jägermeister Stage

- Device
- Aranda
- MonstrO
- 3 Quarters Dead

Day 2, Sunday May 5

Monster Energy Carolina Stage

- Soundgarden (canceled)
- Rise Against (canceled)
- Volbeat (canceled)
- Hollywood Undead
- All That Remains
- Nonpoint (canceled)

Monster Energy Rebellion Stage

- Bush (canceled)
- 3 Doors Down (canceled)
- Buckcherry
- Steel Panther
- Sevendust
- Pop Evil

Jägermeister Stage

- Escape the Fate
- Red Line Chemistry
- Heaven's Basement
- American Fangs

== 2014 ==
Day 1, Saturday May 3

Monster Energy Carolina Stage

- Avenged Sevenfold (headliner)
- Volbeat
- Anthrax (replacement for Motörhead)
- Black Label Society
- Adelitas Way

Monster Energy Rebellion Stage

- Rob Zombie (co-headliner)
- Seether
- Killswitch Engage
- Black Stone Cherry
- Trivium

Jägermeister Stage

- Fozzy
- Thousand Foot Krutch
- Kyng
- Devour the Day
- Truckfighters

Day 2, Sunday May 4

Monster Energy Carolina Stage

- Kid Rock (headliner)
- 311
- A Day to Remember
- Theory of a Deadman
- Hellyeah

Monster Energy Rebellion Stage

- Five Finger Death Punch (co-headliner)
- Staind
- Alter Bridge
- Fuel
- Nothing More

Jägermeister Stage

- Memphis May Fire (replacement for Of Mice & Men)
- Redlight King
- Twelve Foot Ninja
- Gemini Syndrome

== 2015 ==
Day 1, May 2 Monster Energy Carolina Stage

- Marilyn Manson (co-headliner)
- Rise Against
- Chevelle
- Scott Weiland & The Wildabouts
- Nonpoint

Monster Energy Rebellion Stage

- Korn (headliner)
- Sammy Hagar & The Circle
- Papa Roach
- Hollywood Undead (replacement for Bush)
- Of Mice & Men
- We Are Harlot

ReverbNation Stage

- Cheap Trick
- Jackyl
- Stars In Stereo
- Islander
- ReverbNation Band

Jägermeister Stage

- Motionless in White
- Periphery
- Beartooth
- Sons of Texas
- Lola Black

Day 2, May 3

Monster Energy Carolina Stage

- Godsmack (co-headliner)
- Slash featuring Myles Kennedy & The Conspirators
- Halestorm
- In This Moment
- Young Guns

Monster Energy Rebellion Stage

- Slipknot (headliner)
- Slayer
- Breaking Benjamin
- The Pretty Reckless
- Butcher Babies

ReverbNation Stage

- Queensrÿche
- Suicidal Tendencies
- Testament
- Exodus

Jägermeister Stage

- In Flames
- Tremonti
- Hatebreed
- Starset

== 2016 ==
Day 1, Friday May 6

Monster Energy Carolina Stage

- Lynyrd Skynyrd (co-headliner)
- Sixx:A.M.
- Pop Evil
- Black Stone Cherry
- Sick Puppies

Monster Energy Rebellion Stage

- Scorpions (headliner)
- 3 Doors Down
- Hellyeah
- Avatar
- Lacey Sturm
- Aranda

Black Stage

- Collective Soul
- Filter
- Candlebox
- Big Jesus
- The Glorious Sons
- Something Clever

Gold Stage

- Between the Buried and Me
- Escape the Fate
- New Years Day
- From Ashes to New
- Stitched Up Heart

Day 2, Saturday May 7

Monster Energy Carolina Stage

- Five Finger Death Punch (co-headliner)
- Megadeth
- Anthrax
- P.O.D.
- Saint Asonia

Monster Energy Rebellion Stage

- Shinedown (headliner)
- A Day to Remember
- Bullet for My Valentine
- Sevendust
- Trivium
- Red Sun Rising

Black Stage

- Lamb Of God
- Ghost
- Parkway Drive
- Audiotopsy
- Andrew Watt
- Monster Truck

Gold Stage

- Clutch
- The Sword
- Texas Hippie Coalition
- Wilson
- Cane Hill

Day 3, Saturday May 8

Monster Energy Carolina Stage

- Rob Zombie (co-headliner)
- Deftones
- Cypress Hill
- Yelawolf
- Thousand Foot Krutch

Monster Energy Rebellion Stage

- Disturbed (headliner)
- Bring Me the Horizon
- Pennywise
- The Struts
- Hands Like Houses

Black Stage

- Alice Cooper
- Babymetal
- Enter Shikari
- Royal Thunder
- The Shrine

Gold Stage

- Asking Alexandria
- August Burns Red
- Code Orange
- Unlocking the Truth
- '68

== 2017 ==
Day 1, Friday May 5

Monster Energy Carolina Stage

- Soundgarden (headliner)
- Mastodon
- Pierce the Veil
- Of Mice & Men
- The Dillinger Escape Plan
- Black Map

Monster Energy Rebellion Stage

- A Perfect Circle (co-headliner)
- The Cult
- Highly Suspect
- Eagles of Death Metal
- Starset

Black Stage

- Opeth
- Amon Amarth
- Volumes
- Wage War
- As Lions

Gold Stage

- Gojira
- Every Time I Die
- Radkey
- Dorothy
- Mother Feather

Day 2, Saturday May 6

Monster Energy Carolina Stage

- Def Leppard (headliner)
- Tesla
- Alter Bridge
- Rival Sons
- All That Remains
- I Prevail

Monster Energy Rebellion Stage

- Korn (co-headliner)
- Chevelle
- The Pretty Reckless
- In This Moment
- Nothing More
- Aeges

Black Stage

- Sum 41
- Machine Gun Kelly
- Dinosaur Pile-Up
- Royal Republic
- Ded

Gold Stage

- In Flames
- The Amity Affliction
- Frank Carter & The Rattlesnakes
- Badflower
- Cover Your Tracks

Day 3, Sunday May 7

Monster Energy Carolina Stage

- Avenged Sevenfold (headliner)
- Volbeat
- Three Days Grace
- Skillet
- Beartooth

Monster Energy Rebellion Stage

- The Offspring (co-headliner)
- Papa Roach
- Seether
- Motionless in White
- Kyng

Black Stage

- Coheed and Cambria
- Taking Back Sunday
- Sylar
- Citizen Zero

Gold Stage

- Falling in Reverse
- Fozzy
- Fire From the Gods
- Goodbye June
- The Charm The Fury

== 2018 ==
Day 1, Friday May 4

Monster Energy Carolina Stage

- Alice in Chains (headliner)
- Stone Sour
- Bullet For My Valentine
- Pop Evil
- Red Sun Rising

Monster Energy Rebellion Stage

- Shinedown (co-headliner)
- Stone Temple Pilots
- Parkway Drive
- Sevendust
- Avatar

Black Stage

- Underoath
- Tremonti
- Power Trip
- He Is Legend
- Dube

Gold Stage

- Andrew W.K.
- Texas Hippie Coalition
- Stick to Your Guns
- Counterfeit.
- The Wild!

Day 2, Saturday May 5

Monster Energy Carolina Stage

- Godsmack (headliner)
- Breaking Benjamin
- In This Moment
- Trivium
- Shaman's Harvest

Monster Energy Rebellion Stage

- Five Finger Death Punch (co-headliner)
- Halestorm
- Black Veil Brides
- Asking Alexandria
- From Ashes to New

Black Stage

- The Used
- Butcher Babies
- New Years Day
- Them Evils
- Palaye Royale
- Big Story

Gold Stage

- Hatebreed
- Emmure
- Joyous Wolf
- Toothgrinder
- Bad Wolves
- Palisades

Day 3, Sunday May 6

Monster Energy Carolina Stage

- Muse (headliner)
- Incubus
- The Struts
- Greta Van Fleet
- The Bronx

Monster Energy Rebellion Stage

- Queens of the Stone Age (co-headliner)
- Billy Idol
- Clutch
- Thrice
- Quicksand

Black Stage

- Baroness
- The Sword
- Code Orange
- JellyRoll
- Spirit Animal
- Something Clever

Gold Stage

- Red Fang
- The Fever 333
- The Blue Stones
- Mutoid Man
- Cane Hill
