= Rock on the Range =

Former annual rock music festival

- Genre: Hard rock, heavy metal, punk rock
- Dates: Columbus: May 19, 2007; May 17–18, 2008; May 16–17, 2009; May 22–23, 2010; May 20–22, 2011; May 18–20, 2012; May 17–19, 2013; May 16–18, 2014; May 15–17, 2015; May 20–22, 2016; May 19–21, 2017; May 18–20, 2018; Winnipeg: June 27, 2009; August 7, 2010; August 20, 2011
- Locations: Columbus, Ohio, United States; Winnipeg, Manitoba, Canada
- Years active: 2007–2018
- Founders: Right Arm Entertainment
- Website: rockontherange.com

Rock on the Range was an annual rock festival co-promoted by Danny Wimmer Presents (DWP) and AEG Presents. It was held at two locations. The first and main location was in Columbus, Ohio, United States at Mapfre Stadium (originally Columbus Crew Stadium; renamed in 2015) from 2007 to 2018, while the other was in Winnipeg, Manitoba, Canada at the Canad Inns Stadium from 2009 to 2011. Rock on the Range debuted in Columbus on May 19, 2007, and in Winnipeg on June 27, 2009.

The Columbus festival was always held in May and was DWP's first festival produced, while the Winnipeg festival was pushed back to August in 2010. Due to creative differences with AEG, DWP replaced Rock on the Range with the Sonic Temple Art & Music Festival in May 2019.

== Columbus ==
The first Rock on the Range was held on May 19, 2007, at Columbus Crew Stadium. The sold-out festival ran all day, beginning around noon and ending after 11:00 pm. Due to such success, Rock on the Range was turned into an annual event by returning to Columbus Crew Stadium in 2008. The second festival was a two-day event held on the weekend of May 17–18, 2008. This show had the very first Stone Temple Pilots performance in seven years, ending the band's hiatus. The 2009 show was two days as well, on the weekend of May 16–17, 2009. The lineup was announced on Rock on the Range's official website on Friday, February 13, 2009. For the 2010 festival, each stage has its own sponsor. While the Zippo Music Stage (formerly Jägermeister) is still the same, the "second" stage and the main stage (as they have been previously called) are now referred to as the Bud Light Stage (formerly the Kicker Stage) and the Monster Energy Stage, respectively. Other sponsors host their own events, such as Sony's PlayStation bus that demos new video games. An FYE tent is located near the Kicker Stage where, upon purchase of certain bands' CDs, many meet-and-greets take place.

The festival would often draw more than 30,000 fans each day onto the Columbus Crew Stadium grounds from its inception but in recent years that number has swelled to approximately 40,000 per day. This has occurred mainly due to a rise in the festival's popularity as well as some changes to the festival grounds layout and expansion of the number of festival days.

Rock on the Range's Main Stage at Columbus Crew Stadium in 2008

In 2007 and 2008, two stages were set up: The main stage is inside the stadium at one end of the soccer field, and the second stage is in the parking lot just outside the stadium. For the 2009 show, a third stage was added, the Zippo Music Stage (formerly the Jägermeister stage). It is located outside of the stadium on the opposite side of the second stage. The typical ticket price in the past, and for 2010 as well, is around $50–65 per day, depending on whether attendees choose to have field-access or not. Rock on the Range 2009 was Avenged Sevenfold's last appearance in the United States before their drummer, Jimmy "The Rev" Sullivan died on December 28, 2009. During their performance on May 22, 2010, the music video for Papa Roach's single "Kick in the Teeth" was filmed.

In 2011 and 2012 the festival saw a major change and was expanded to include an additional half-day Friday Night Pre-party that saw the addition of four more bands being added for the party.

In 2013 it was announced that the pre-party day would be made into another full day by adding six more bands to the previous four bands to officially make the festival a three-day event. Also, new to this event year is an updated festival layout and new amenities including a comedy tent and stage, thanks to sponsors Old Milwaukee, Pabst Blue Ribbon and The Funny Bone.

In 2014 it was announced that the third day added in 2013 would be expanded to allow for additional bands to be added to the line-up. The comedy tent and stage added in 2013 would also return. Also, new was an updated festival layout with the addition of carnival rides including a Ferris wheel and a Shock drop.

After the 2018 festival, Danny Wimmer Presents announced that Rock on the Range would be replaced by the Sonic Temple Art & Music Festival in 2019 at the same location due to creative differences with co-promoter AEG Presents.

=== Estimated attendance each year ===
- 2007 – 35,000 (one-day total) sold-out event
- 2008 – 55,000 (two-day total)
- 2009 – 55,000 (two-day total)
- 2010 – 60,000 (two-day total)
- 2011 – 70,000 (two-and-a-half-day total)
- 2012 – 70,000 (two-and-a-half-day total)
- 2013 – 103,000+ (three-day total) sold-out event
- 2014 – 120,000 (three-day total) sold-out event
- 2015 – 120,000 (three-day total) sold-out event
- 2016 – 120,000 (three-day total) sold-out event
- 2017 – 135,000 (three-day total) sold-out event
- 2018 – 140,000 (three-day total) sold-out event

=== 2007 lineup ===
Saturday, May, 19 14 bands, all 14 played

Main Stage:

- ZZ Top
- Evanescence
- Velvet Revolver
- Hinder
- Chevelle
- Three Days Grace
- Buckcherry
- Breaking Benjamin

"Mad Packers" Second Stage:

- Papa Roach
- Puddle of Mudd
- Black Stone Cherry
- Operator
- 2Cents
- Whitestarr

=== 2008 lineup ===
27 bands scheduled, 26 played

Day one (Saturday, May 17)

Main Stage:

- Stone Temple Pilots
- Disturbed
- Staind
- Killswitch Engage
- Serj Tankian
- Shinedown
- Finger Eleven

The ODPS Stage:

- Filter
- 10 Years
- Red
- Theory of a Deadman
- Airbourne
- Ashes Divide
- Drive A

Day two (Sunday, May 18)

Main Stage:

- Kid Rock
- 3 Doors Down
- Papa Roach
- Seether
- Flyleaf did not play
- Alter Bridge
- Five Finger Death Punch

The ODPS Stage:

- Sevendust
- Drowning Pool
- Bobaflex
- Black Tide
- Rev Theory
- Saving Abel

=== 2009 lineup ===
38 bands scheduled, all played

Day one (Saturday, May 16)

Main stage:

- Slipknot
- Alice in Chains
- Korn
- Chevelle
- Flyleaf
- Saliva
- Black Stone Cherry

Second stage:

- Atreyu
- All That Remains
- Rev Theory
- Loaded
- Crooked X
- The Veer Union
- Early Pearl

Jägermeister stage:

- Static-X
- Hurt
- Halestorm
- X Factor 1
- Leo Project

Day two (Sunday, May 17)

Main stage:

- Mötley Crüe
- Avenged Sevenfold
- Buckcherry
- Shinedown
- Blue October
- Saving Abel
- Hoobastank

Second stage:

- The Used
- Billy Talent
- Sick Puppies
- Pop Evil
- Cavo
- Framing Hanley
- Drive A

Jägermeister stage:

- Clutch
- Charm City Devils
- Adelitas Way
- Burn Halo
- Royal Bliss

=== 2010 lineup ===
38 bands scheduled, all played

Day one (Saturday, May 22)

Monster Energy stage:

- Godsmack
- Three Days Grace
- Rise Against
- Deftones
- Papa Roach
- Puddle of Mudd
- Drowning Pool
- Sevendust

Kicker stage:

- Killswitch Engage
- Skillet
- Halestorm
- Adelitas Way
- Violent Soho
- Richy Nix

Jägermeister stage:

- Helmet
- Nonpoint
- Janus
- Taddy Porter
- Like a Storm

Day two (Sunday, May 23)

Monster Energy stage:

- Limp Bizkit
- Rob Zombie
- Seether
- Slash
- Theory of a Deadman
- Bullet for My Valentine
- Five Finger Death Punch
- Apocalyptica

Kicker stage:

- Mastodon
- Coheed and Cambria
- Anberlin
- Circa Survive
- Airbourne
- Shaman's Harvest

Jägermeister stage:

- Mushroomhead
- Taproot
- Year Long Disaster
- Noise Auction
- State Your Cause

=== 2011 lineup ===
May 20 pre-party (Friday night)

f.y.e. stage only (all four bands)

- Steel Panther
- Danko Jones
- Lez Zeppelin
- Red Line Chemistry

40 bands scheduled, all played

Day one (Saturday, May 21)

Monster Energy stage:

- Avenged Sevenfold
- Korn
- Staind
- Alter Bridge
- Hinder
- Sick Puppies
- Rev Theory
- Finger Eleven

f.y.e. stage:

- Danzig
- Escape the Fate
- My Darkest Days
- Crossfade
- Asking Alexandria
- Trust Company

Jägermeister stage:

- P.O.D.
- Black Veil Brides
- 2Cents
- Egypt Central
- Hourcast
- Downplay

Day two (Sunday, May 22)

Monster Energy stage:

- A Perfect Circle
- Disturbed
- Puddle of Mudd (replacement for Stone Sour)
- Bullet for My Valentine
- Black Label Society
- All That Remains
- Saving Abel
- 10 Years

f.y.e. stage:

- Hollywood Undead
- A Day to Remember
- Trapt
- Cavo
- Pop Evil
- Greek Fire

Jägermeister stage:

- The Damned Things
- The Red Jumpsuit Apparatus
- Evans Blue
- Art of Dying
- Red Fang
- 7th Cycle

=== 2012 lineup ===
May 18 Pre-party, Friday Night 4Play

f.y.e. stage four bands

- Hairball
- Foxy Shazam
- Black Tide
- Hells Bells

40 bands scheduled, all played

Day one (Saturday, May 19)

Monster Energy stage:

- Incubus
- Shinedown
- Five Finger Death Punch
- Slash featuring Myles Kennedy and The Conspirators
- Chevelle
- Theory of a Deadman
- Halestorm
- Adelitas Way

f.y.e. stage:

- Cypress Hill
- P.O.D.
- Cavo
- Falling in Reverse
- New Medicine
- Emphatic

Jägermeister stage:

- Bobaflex
- In This Moment
- Kyng
- Rival Sons
- Otherwise
- Noise Auction

Day two (Sunday, May 20)

Monster Energy stage:

- Rob Zombie
- Marilyn Manson
- Megadeth
- Mastodon
- Volbeat
- The Darkness
- Escape the Fate
- Black Stone Cherry

f.y.e. stage:

- Anthrax
- Down
- Attack Attack!
- Trivium
- Redlight King
- Aranda

Jägermeister stage:

- Lacuna Coil
- 12 Stones
- James Durbin
- SOiL
- Eve to Adam
- Ghost of August

=== 2013 lineup ===
50 bands scheduled, all played

Day one (Friday, May 17)

Monster Energy main stage:

- Korn
- Cheap Trick
- Buckcherry
- Hollywood Undead
- Love and Death

Jägermeister stage:

- In Flames
- Oleander
- Mindset Evolution
- American Fangs
- XFACTOR1

Day two (Saturday, May 18)

Monster Energy main stage:

- The Smashing Pumpkins
- Stone Sour
- Three Days Grace
- Papa Roach
- Bullet for My Valentine
- Halestorm
- All That Remains
- Pop Evil

Pabst Blue Ribbon stage:

- A Day to Remember
- Asking Alexandria
- Black Veil Brides
- Motionless in White
- Otherwise
- Young Guns

Jägermeister stage:

- Clutch
- The Sword
- Red Line Chemistry
- Heaven's Basement
- Gemini Syndrome
- Scorpion Child

Old Milwaukee comedy stage:

- Ari Shafir
- Jim Florentine
- Big Jay Oakerson
- Bill Arrundale
- Bill Squire

Day three (Sunday, May 19)

Monster Energy main stage:

- Soundgarden
- Alice in Chains
- Bush
- Volbeat
- Skillet
- Steel Panther
- Sevendust
- Sick Puppies

Pabst Blue Ribbon stage:

- Lamb of God
- Device
- In This Moment
- Ghost B.C.
- Red
- Big Wreck

Jägermeister stage:

- Deuce
- Middle Class Rut
- Thousand Foot Krutch
- Beware of Darkness
- O'Brother
- Error 504

Old Milwaukee comedy stage:

- Jim Florentine
- Big Jay Oakerson
- Rod Paulette
- Dan Swartwout
- Bob Cook

=== 2014 lineup ===
60 bands scheduled, all played

Day one (Friday, May 16)

Monster Energy main stage:

- Guns N' Roses
- Staind
- Seether
- Black Label Society
- Killswitch Engage
- Black Stone Cherry
- Redlight King

Ernie Ball stage:

- Down
- Living Colour
- Reignwolf
- We Came as Romans
- Thousand Foot Krutch
- Kyng
- Devour the Day

Jägermeister stage:

- Lacuna Coil
- Butcher Babies
- One Ok Rock
- Truckfighters
- Werm
- Kill Devil Hill

Old Milwaukee comedy stage:

- Jim Florentine
- Michael Harrisson
- Chuck Zumock
- Sumukh Torgalkar
- Keith Bender

Day two (Saturday, May 17)

Monster Energy main stage:

- Avenged Sevenfold
- Slayer
- Chevelle
- Theory of a Deadman
- Pop Evil
- Fuel
- Rev Theory

Ernie Ball stage:

- Suicidal Tendencies
- The Pretty Reckless
- Nothing More
- Texas Hippie Coalition
- King 810
- We as Human
- Stars in Stereo

Jägermeister stage:

- Exodus
- Fozzy
- Avatar
- Crobot
- Wilson
- INFIDEL

Old Milwaukee comedy stage:

- Don Jamieson
- Joe Howard
- Bill Crawford
- Bill Squire
- Brian Kenny

Day three (Sunday, May 18)

Monster Energy main stage:

- Kid Rock
- Five Finger Death Punch
- Alter Bridge
- Mastodon
- Wolfmother
- Adelitas Way
- Trivium

Ernie Ball stage:

- Jason Bonham's Led Zeppelin Experience
- Of Mice & Men
- Miss May I
- Harlot
- Heaven's Basement
- Gemini Syndrome
- Righteous Vendetta

Jägermeister stage:

- Gojira
- Kvelertak
- Jim Breuer Band
- Twelve Foot Ninja
- Monster Truck
- Sleepwave

Old Milwaukee comedy stage:

- Jim Breuer
- Aaron Kleiber
- Chris Coen
- Darrell Dawson

=== 2015 lineup ===
60 bands scheduled, all played

Day one (Friday, May 15)

Monster Energy main stage:

- Slipknot
- Marilyn Manson
- Slash featuring Myles Kennedy and The Conspirators
- Breaking Benjamin
- Live
- Apocalyptica
- We Are Harlot

Ernie Ball stage:

- Falling in Reverse
- Yelawolf
- The Dillinger Escape Plan
- Young Guns
- Vamps
- Islander
- Shaman's Harvest

Jägermeister stage:

- Hatebreed
- Beartooth
- DangerKids
- Dorothy
- Highly Suspect
- X Factor 1

Rolling Rock comedy tent:

- Brian Posehn
- Jim Florentine
- Mark Poolos
- Brent Terhune
- Joe Howard

Day two (Saturday, May 16)

Monster Energy main stage:

- Judas Priest
- Godsmack
- Papa Roach
- In This Moment
- Scott Weiland and The Wildabouts
- Of Mice & Men
- Saint Asonia

Ernie Ball stage:

- Ministry
- In Flames
- Babymetal
- Tremonti
- Sabaton
- Like a Storm
- Screaming for Silence

Jägermeister stage:

- The Devil Wears Prada
- Nonpoint
- Saxon
- From Ashes to New
- Red Sun Rising
- Novallo

Rolling Rock comedy tent:

- Jim Norton
- Don Jamieson
- Bill Squire
- Jay Snyder
- Bill Arrundale

Day three (Sunday, May 17)

Monster Energy main stage:

- Linkin Park
- Rise Against
- Volbeat
- Halestorm
- Anthrax
- The Pretty Reckless
- Hollywood Undead

Ernie Ball stage:

- Tech N9ne
- Motionless in White
- Rival Sons
- Otherwise
- Starset
- Art of Dying
- Unlocking the Truth

Jägermeister stage:

- Periphery
- Upon a Burning Body
- Crobot
- Marmozets
- September Mourning
- Santa Cruz

Rolling Rock comedy tent:

- Rob Schneider
- Rod Paulette
- Jake Innarino
- Craig Peters
- Chad Zumrock

=== 2016 lineup ===
Day one (Friday, May 20)

Monster Energy Main Stage:

- Disturbed
- Shinedown
- A Day to Remember
- Sixx:A.M.
- Bullet for My Valentine
- Sevendust
- Sick Puppies

Stage Two:

- Megadeth
- Machine Gun Kelly
- Asking Alexandria
- Trivium
- Enter Shikari
- Avatar
- Monster Truck

Stage Three:

- Butcher Babies
- Memphis May Fire
- Miss May I
- Andrew Watt
- We Came as Romans
- Cane Hill

Rolling Rock Comedy Tent:

- Jay Mohr
- Bethany Dwyer
- Gary Menke
- Jay Snyder
- Adrian Crosby

Day two (Saturday, May 21)

Monster Energy Main Stage:

- Rob Zombie
- Five Finger Death Punch
- Hellyeah
- Steel Panther
- Pop Evil
- Saint Asonia
- P.O.D.

Stage Two:

- Lamb of God
- Ghost
- Parkway Drive
- Issues
- Texas Hippie Coalition
- Aranda
- Lacey Sturm

Stage Three:

- Clutch
- Crown the Empire
- New Years Day
- Wilson
- JellyRoll
- Citizen Zero

Rolling Rock Comedy Tent:

- That Metal Show live
- Craig Gass
- Madison Malloy

Day three (Sunday, May 22)

Monster Energy Main Stage:

- Red Hot Chili Peppers
- Deftones
- Bring Me the Horizon
- Wolfmother
- Death from Above 1979
- The Struts
- Highly Suspect

Stage Two:

- At the Drive-In
- Pennywise
- Anti-Flag
- Red Sun Rising
- Hands Like Houses
- The Glorious Sons
- The Shelters

Stage Three:

- Between the Buried and Me
- The Sword
- The Shrine
- Wild Throne
- Code Orange
- Silver Snake

Rolling Rock Comedy Tent:

- Jay Oakerson
- Nate Bargatze
- Bill Squire
- Jay Armstrong
- Chad Zumock

=== 2017 lineup ===
Day one (Friday, May 19)

Monster Energy main stage:

- Soundgarden (did not play due to the death of Chris Cornell)
- Live
- Chevelle
- Bush
- Of Mice & Men
- Thrice
- Beartooth

Stage two:

- Pierce the Veil
- Sum 41
- Motionless in White
- The Amity Affliction
- I Prevail
- Badflower
- Goodbye June

Stage three:

- Gojira
- Norma Jean
- Red Fang
- Bleeker
- Cover Your Tracks
- Aeges

Day two (Saturday, May 20)

Monster Energy main stage:

- Korn
- The Offspring
- Papa Roach
- Seether
- Alter Bridge
- Skillet
- Starset

Stage two:

- Coheed and Cambria
- Taking Back Sunday
- The Story So Far
- Kyng
- Ded
- Sylar
- Fire from the Gods

Stage three:

- In Flames
- Whitechapel
- Attila
- Turnstile
- Frank Carter & The Rattlesnakes
- One Less Reason

Day three (Sunday, May 21)

Monster Energy main stage:

- Metallica
- Volbeat
- Primus
- The Pretty Reckless
- Biffy Clyro
- Nothing More
- Rival Sons

Stage two:

- Amon Amarth
- The Dillinger Escape Plan
- Zakk Sabbath
- Dinosaur Pile-Up
- Radkey
- Dorothy
- As Lions

Stage three:

- Deafheaven
- Suicide Silence
- Every Time I Die
- Wage War
- Royal Republic
- Mother Feather

=== 2018 lineup ===
Day one (Friday, May 18)

Monster Energy Main Stage:

- Alice in Chains
- A Perfect Circle
- Breaking Benjamin
- Machine Gun Kelly
- Greta Van Fleet
- 10 Years
- The Bronx

Zippo Encore Stage:

- Underoath
- Quicksand
- Hawthorne Heights
- Turnstile
- Senses Fail
- The Fever 333
- I See Stars

Bud Light Stage:

- Body Count
- Atreyu
- Power Trip
- Dance Gavin Dance
- Mutoid Man
- Spirit Animal

Rolling Rock Comedy Tent:

- Trae Crowder
- Tim Dillon
- Jake Iannarino
- Tom Dustin
- Jay Armstrong

Day two (Saturday, May 19)

Monster Energy Main Stage:

- Avenged Sevenfold
- Stone Sour
- Three Days Grace
- Black Veil Brides
- Asking Alexandria
- New Years Day

Zippo Encore Stage:

- Tech N9ne
- Trivium
- From Ashes to New
- JellyRoll
- My Ticket Home
- Like Moths to Flames

Bud Light Stage:

- Andrew W.K.
- Emmure
- Miss May I
- Wilson
- grandson

Rolling Rock Comedy Tent:

- J.B. Smoove
- Yannis Pappas
- Jason Banks
- Bill Squire
- Chad Zumock

Day three (Sunday, May 20)

Monster Energy Main Stage:

- Tool
- Godsmack
- Stone Temple Pilots
- The Used
- I Prevail
- Red Sun Rising
- Tyler Bryant & the Shakedown
- Them Evils

Zippo Encore Stage:

- Babymetal
- Baroness
- Code Orange
- Like a Storm
- Shaman's Harvest
- Shim
- Stitched Up Heart

Bud Light Stage:

- Yelawolf
- Anti-Flag
- We Came as Romans
- Toothgrinder
- Joyous Wolf
- Pray For Sleep

Rolling Rock Comedy Tent:

- Big Jay Oakerson
- Taylor Tomlinson
- Zach Martina
- Aaron Kleiber

== Winnipeg ==
On February 13, 2009, Rock on the Range announced that the festival would travel to Winnipeg, Manitoba in Canada to play at Canad Inns Stadium. The show was on Saturday, June 27, 2009. The weather throughout the day was rain and clouds, earning this year's festival the nickname "Rock in the Rain".

Rock on the Range Canada 2010 on August 7, 2010, had sunny skies with over 15,000 fans in attendance. On March 19, 2010, it was announced Rock on the Range Canada has signed a new multi-year agreement with Manitoba Telecom Services to become the new title sponsor until 2012. The new name under the agreement is "MTS Rock on the Range Canada". On July 18, 2011, Rock on the Range Canada was going to be moved to the MTS Centre due to the weather.

March 2, 2012, Winnipeg radio station Power 97 posted on their Twitter that MTS Rock on the Range Canada would not be happening in 2012.

=== 2009 lineup ===
15 bands scheduled, all played

Saturday, June 27

Main stage

- Billy Talent
- Rise Against
- Rancid
- Theory of a Deadman
- Shinedown
- Thornley
- Blue October
- Die Mannequin

Second stage

- Anvil
- Silverstein
- Inward Eye
- Hollywood Undead
- Pop Evil
- Age of Daze
- Sick of Sarah

=== 2010 lineup ===
13 bands scheduled, all played

Saturday, August 7

Monster Energy stage

- Stone Temple Pilots
- Godsmack
- Three Days Grace
- Buckcherry
- Finger Eleven
- Crash Karma
- Danko Jones

Jägermeister stage

- The Trews
- Airbourne
- Bleeker Ridge
- Domenica
- MENEW
- Sons of York

=== 2011 lineup ===
13 bands scheduled, 12 played

Saturday August 20

Monster Energy stage

- Alice in Chains
- Evanescence
- Five Finger Death Punch
- Hinder
- Duff McKagan's Loaded
- Art of Dying
- Me Versus:

Jägermeister stage

- The Sheepdogs
- Volbeat
- Anberlin
- The Reason
- Drive A
