= Epicenter (music festival) =

Annual music festival

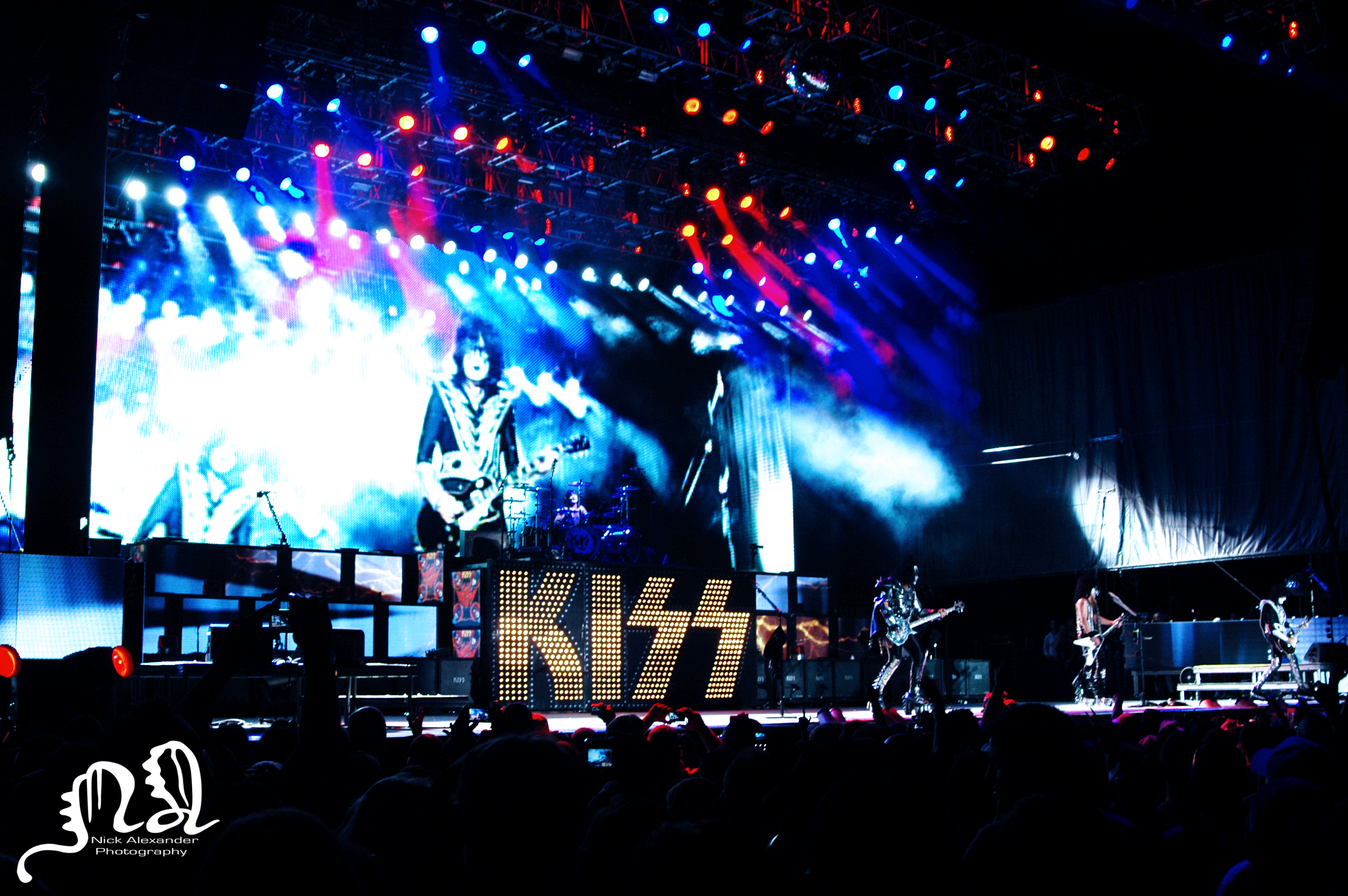
- KISS Performing at Epicenter 2010
- Genre: Hard rock, heavy metal, post-hardcore, progressive metal
- Dates: Multiple
- Locations: Southern California, Rockingham Speedway, Charlotte Motor Speedway
- Years active: 2009–2013, 2015, 2019, 2020
- Website: epicenterfestival.com

Epicenter was a rock festival featuring acts on multiple stages started by Danny Wimmer Presents in Southern California where it was sponsored by KROQ.

Continuing in North Carolina, in 2019 Epicenter took the place of the Carolina Rebellion.

The 2020 edition was cancelled due to the COVID-19 pandemic.

== Event ==
Date	Location	Lineup		
August 22, 2009	Fairplex – Pomona, California	Main stage: Tool, Linkin Park with Dead by Sunrise, Alice in Chains, Wolfmother, Atreyu, Hollywood Undead, Street Sweeper Social Club, DJ "Scratch N Sniff" Monster Energy stage: Atmosphere, Aesop Rock, Paper Tongues, Sonny, After Midnight Project		
September 25–26, 2010	Auto Club Speedway – Fontana, California	Day 1 Main stage: Kiss, Eminem, Bush, Papa Roach, Big Boi, Crash Kings, Deuce (formerly of Hollywood Undead) Monster Energy stage: House of Pain, Big B with Scott Russo (from Unwritten Law), The Knux, Smile Empty Soul, Kinda Major, The Envy VIP stage: DMX		Day 2 Main stage: Blink-182, Rise Against, Thirty Seconds to Mars, Bad Religion, Against Me!, A Day to Remember, The Academy Is... Monster Energy stage: Suicidal Tendencies, The Black Pacific, New Politics, Black Veil Brides, Biffy Clyro
September 24, 2011	Verizon Wireless Amphitheater – Irvine, California	Limp Bizkit, Staind, Papa Roach, Five Finger Death Punch, Everlast, Buckcherry, Puddle of Mudd, P.O.D., Skillet, Crossfade, Red, Asking Alexandria, Redlight King, Middle Class Rut, Drive A		
September 22, 2012	Verizon Wireless Amphitheater – Irvine, California	Stone Temple Pilots, Deftones, Bush, Scars on Broadway, Chevelle, Hollywood Undead, Escape the Fate, Dead Sara, Crash Kings, Hyro Da Hero, Beware of Darkness		
September 21, 2013	Verizon Wireless Amphitheater – Irvine, California	The Offspring, A Day to Remember, Bad Religion, Pennywise, Pierce the Veil, All Time Low, Falling in Reverse, The Wonder Years, Fidlar, New Beat Fund, Plague Vendor		
March 14, 2015	The Forum, – Inglewood, California	Korn, Limp Bizkit, House of Pain, P.O.D., Suicidal Tendencies, Hopsin		
May 10–12, 2019	Rockingham Speedway - Rockingham, North Carolina	Day 1 Korn, Rob Zombie, The Prodigy, Evanescence, Machine Gun Kelly, Meshuggah, Skillet, Beartooth, Mark Lanegan Band, Dorothy, Black Pistol Fire, Zeal & Ardor, Knocked Loose, Slothrust, Wilson, Hands Like Houses, Hyro the Hero, Amigo the Devil, Ded, Arrested Youth, Vein, Black Coffee	Day 2 Tool, Judas Priest, The Cult, Bush, Black Label Society, Circa Survive, Yelawolf, Motionless in White, The Damned Things, Grandson, Badflower, Memphis May Fire, Light the Torch, Wage War, Crobot, Dead Girls Academy, Sylar, Counterfeit, Pretty Vicious, Shvpes, Dirty Honey, Alien Weaponry, Hyde, Tetrarch	Day 3 Foo Fighters, Bring Me the Horizon, 311, Live, Mastodon, Killswitch Engage, Architects, The Interrupters, Tom Morello, Fever 333, Reignwolf, Yungblud, The Glorious Sons, Ho99o9, While She Sleeps, Basement, Scarlxrd, Movements, Teenage Wrist, Demob Happy, Boston Manor, Cleopatrick, The Dirty Nil
