= Rockingham Speedway =

Motorsport track in the United States

Rockingham Speedway and Entertainment Complex
The Rock

- D-shaped Oval (1965–present)
- Location: 2152 North U.S. Highway 1 Rockingham, North Carolina, United States; 28379
- Coordinates: 34°58′27.05″N 79°36′37.51″W
- Capacity: 32,000
- Owner: International Hot Rod Association (December 2025–present)
- Opened: October 27, 1965; 61 years ago
- Construction cost: US$1 million
- Former names: North Carolina Motor Speedway (1965–1997); North Carolina Speedway (1998–2007)
- Major events: Current: NHRA Mission Foods Drag Racing Series (2026–2027); NASCAR O'Reilly Auto Parts Series; North Carolina Education Lottery 250 (1982–2004, 2025–2026); NASCAR Craftsman Truck Series; Black's Tire 200 (2012–2013, 2025–2026); ARCA Menards Series East; Rockingham ARCA Menards Series East 125 (2025–2026); Former: NASCAR Cup Series; Subway 400 (1966–2004); Pop Secret Microwave Popcorn 400 (1965–2003); ARCA Racing Series; American 200 (1973, 2008–2010)
- Website: rockingham-speedway.com

D-shaped Oval (2022–present)
- Surface: Asphalt
- Length: 0.940 mi (1.513 km)
- Turns: 4
- Banking: Turns 1 and 2: 22° Turns 3 and 4: 25° Straights: 8°
- Race lap record: 0:22.847 ( (United States) Brent Crews, Toyota Camry TRD, 2025, ARCA Menards)

Road Course (1977–present)
- Surface: Asphalt
- Length: 1.500 mi (2.414 km)
- Turns: 8
- Banking: Oval turns 1 and 2: 22° Oval turns 3 and 4: 25° Straights: 8°

Little Rock (2008–present)
- Length: 0.526 mi (0.847 km)

D-shaped Oval (1965–2021)
- Surface: Asphalt
- Length: 1.017 mi (1.636 km)
- Turns: 4
- Banking: Turns 1 and 2: 22° Turns 3 and 4: 25° Straights: 8°

Rockingham Speedway and Entertainment Complex (formerly known as North Carolina Speedway from 1998 to 2007 and North Carolina Motor Speedway from 1965 to 1997) is a 0.94 mi (1.513 km) D-shaped oval track in Rockingham, North Carolina, United States. The track has held a variety of events since its opening in 1965, including NASCAR. It has a 32,000-seat capacity as of 2012. Rockingham Speedway is owned by the International Hot Rod Association (IHRA).

Rockingham Speedway opened in 1965 under the control of attorney Elsie Webb. Initially opening as a flat 1 mi (1.6 km) oval, in 1969, the track's dimensions were changed to make the bankings steeper and the track slightly longer. After Webb's death in 1972, NASCAR team owner L. G. DeWitt took over control of the facility. Renovations on the speedway remained slow for decades. Despite a push to make renovations and seating additions after Roger Penske bought the facility in 1997, due to a lack of amenities, poor attendance, and NASCAR's expansion towards bigger markets, NASCAR left the facility in 2004 in the wake of the Ferko lawsuit. With the exception of a brief period of racing under the ownership of Andy Hillenburg, the facility was left desolate for most of the 2010s. In 2018, a group of investors led by Dan Lovenheim bought and renovated the facility into a multi-use complex, with NASCAR returning in 2025 under Lovenheim's leadership.

== Description ==
=== Configuration ===
Rockingham Speedway in its current form is measured at 0.940 mi (1.513 km), with 22° of banking in the track's first two turns, 25° of banking in the track's last two turns, and 8° of banking on the track's straights. A 1.5-mile (2.4 km) road course layout consisting of an infield road course combined with parts of the oval was added to the facility in 1977.

=== Amenities ===
Rockingham Speedway is located in Rockingham, North Carolina, and is served by U.S. Route 1 and North Carolina Highway 177. As of 2012, the track has a capacity of 32,000 according to ESPN. At its peak, the track had a capacity of 60,122 according to The News & Observer. Alongside the main oval, a 0.526-mile (0.847 km) replica of the Martinsville Speedway named "Little Rock" was constructed in 2008 outside of the oval track's confines.

== Track history ==
=== Planning and construction ===
On April 25, 1964, The Charlotte Observer's reported that construction began on a $250,000 racetrack led by Darlington Raceway founder Harold Brasington and businessman W. R. "Bill" Land on a 175-acre (71 ha) plot of land near an intersection of U.S. Route 1 and North Carolina Highway 177. Initial plans for the facility included a 1-mile (1.6 km) paved oval, a 0.500 mi (0.805 km) dirt oval, and a 0.500 mi (0.805 km) drag strip. News on updates largely remained slow, with the construction process of then-called North Carolina Motor Speedway (NCMS) being described as a "well-kept secret" by State writer Joe Whitlock in an April 1965 report. On April 23, 1965, Brasington announced the track's inaugural event: a 500-mile (800 km) NASCAR Grand National Series race on October 31 titled the American 500. In May, grandstands for the facility were constructed. Four months later, Paving of NCMS was completed, At the end of the track's construction, NCMS had a seating capacity of 26,062, with the project costing approximately $1,000,000 (adjusted for inflation, $10,216,473). The entirety of the project was financed by a group of 11 investors headed by attorney Elsie Webb; the group of investors included Webb, Brasington, Dr. George Galloway, L. G. DeWitt, L. V. Hogan, R. N. Lewis, R. W. Goodman, Hugh A. Lee, Bernie Locklear, J. M. Long, and W. R. Webb Jr.

=== Early Elsie Webb years ===
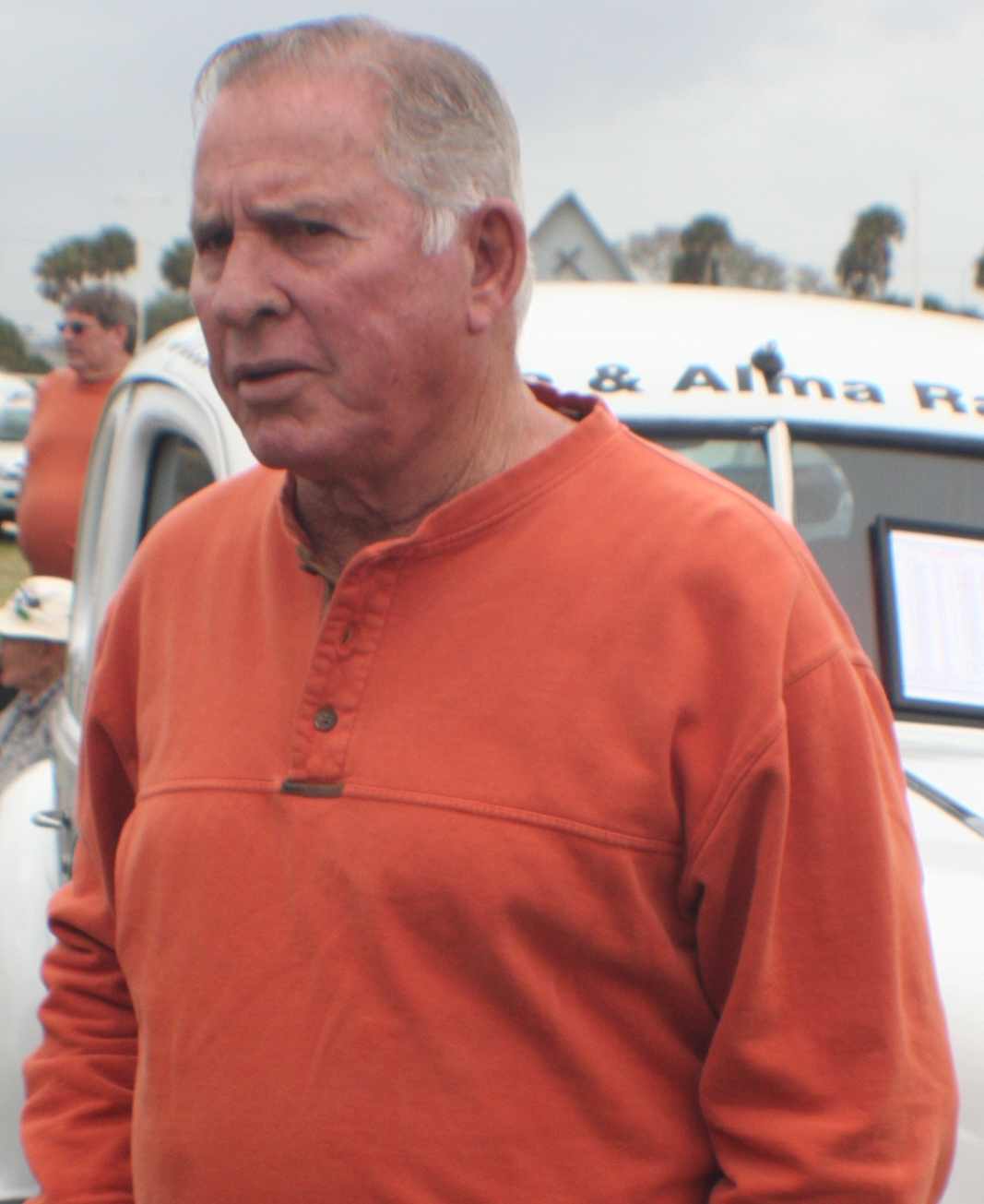
NASCAR driver David Pearson (pictured in 2008) set the first official world record at the facility, setting the record for the fastest mile on a closed oval.

The first testing sessions took place on September 21 by drivers Darel Dieringer and Bobby Isaac, with Dieringer setting an unofficial world record for average speed on a mile-long oval. An official world record attempt was made six days later, with David Pearson setting a lap of 113.175 mph (182.138 km/h). NCMS officially opened to the public on October 27 for qualifying runs for the American 500. The race ran four days later, with Curtis Turner winning the event. After the event, the facility received consistent positive reviews from both drivers and media for its amenities and racing product. In January 1966, Brasington sold his interest of NCMS, with Webb taking over as president and general manager of NCMS a month later. In June 1967, construction of an air-conditioned "experiment" grandstand near the track's press box was completed. A year and a half later, NCMS officials announced a $150,000 project to completely repave the track and add a lane to an infield tunnel that was widely criticized for being one lane wide. Originally, plans were also made to reconfigure the oval to 1.5 miles (2.4 km); however, the idea was scrapped in April, with Webb stating, "I talked with 90% of the drivers and didn't find one in favor of lengthening the track". Repaving of NCMS began on March and was completed in October of that year; by the end of the repave, the straights were banked at 8°, the first two turns at 22°, and the last two turns at 25°. However, after one race that saw numerous crashes due to rough patches caused by rainy weather during the repave, the track was repaved again and completed by February 1970 to correct the issue.

=== L. G. DeWitt era ===
On January 18, 1972, Elsie Webb died from ulcer surgery complications. Nine days later, NASCAR team owner and peach farmer L. G. DeWitt was elected as Webb's replacement as president of NCMS. Developments on the facility remained slow in the early years of DeWitt's leadership. In 1977, after the track surface received complaints from drivers for being too rough, track officials opted to place down sealant in time for the 1977 Carolina 500; it was widely negatively received by drivers and beat reporters for making the surface too slippery, being blamed for numerous wrecks in that year's Carolina 500. Despite complaints, continued occasional coats of sealant were put on the track in following years, with track officials stating that the sealant was cheaper than the alternative of repaving. That same year, a road course layout consisting of parts of the oval and newly constructed sections within the track's infield was completed in December. The following year, the track's scoring board was updated from a manual, hand-operated scoreboard to an electronic scoreboard. In March 1979, a brief attempt to depose DeWitt as president by stockholder L. V. Hogan was made; however, the conflict was resolved after DeWitt agreed to buy any stock from dissenting stockholders.

In the early 1980s, California businessman Warner W. Hodgdon made numerous unsuccessful attempts to purchase ownership of NCMS. Starting in the mid-1980s, numerous developments were made to NCMS. In 1984, NCMS owners purchased the nearby Rockingham Dragway, placing it under NCMS control. Within the same year, new cement barriers to the track's third and fourth turns along with a new 1,500-seat grandstand over the first turn named the Winston Tower were either completed or announced. The following year, after delaying it for a year, NCMS underwent a complete repave in time for the 1985 Nationwise 500; the first since 1969. Another 4,500-seat tower located at the track's fourth turn alongside the addition of six VIP lounges was completed in 1986, increasing seating capacity to approximately 33,000. In 1990, another 1,500-seat grandstand on the track's fourth turn was announced.

=== Conflict with growth of NASCAR, Roger Penske purchase ===
Heading into the 1990s, the facility's future as a whole, particularly on retaining a Cup Series weekend was uncertain due to NASCAR's prioritization in expanding into bigger television markets. On October 9, 1990, L. G. DeWitt died after a lengthy bout with an illness, with Frank Wilson being elected to replace DeWitt as NCMS president nine days later. In 1992, NCMS sold its ownership of Rockingham Dragway to Atlanta Dragway owner Stephen Earwood. NCMS officials also announced the construction of an additional tower containing 2,000 seats at the track's second turn within the year. Frank's tenure as president was brief; four years into his title, he died on August 20, 1994, due to a stroke. L. G. DeWitt's daughter, Joyce DeWitt Wilson, replaced Frank as president of NCMS in September. In July 1995, numerous renovated buildings were built, improving the infield care center, garages, and media center. However, despite expansion and seating additions, the facility remained one of the lowest attended tracks on the NASCAR schedule by the mid-1990s, and fears of NCMS being dropped from the Cup Series schedule due to its small market and attendance numbers were widespread.

==== Penske–Smith battle for control ====
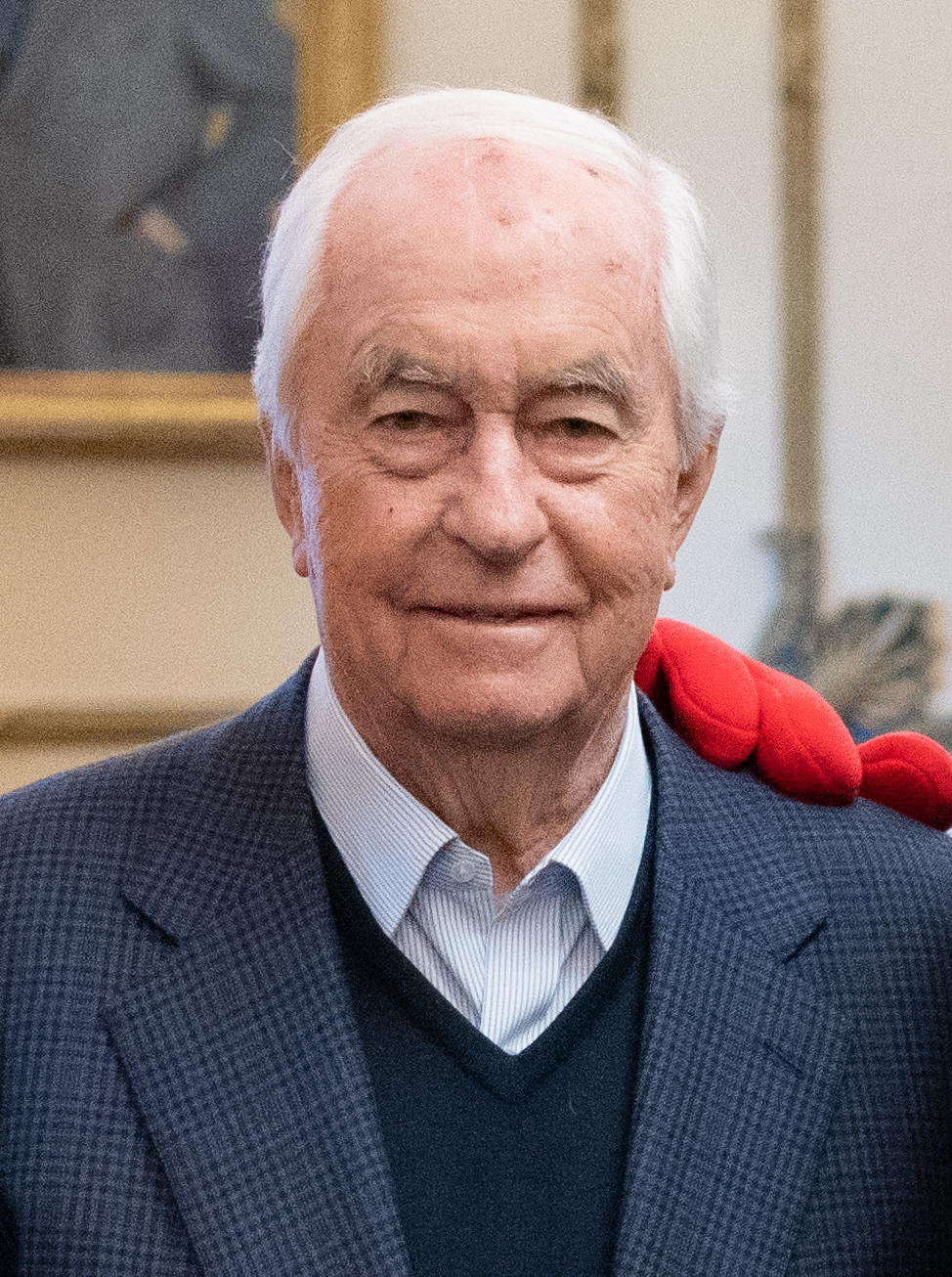
Motorsports businessmen Bruton Smith and Roger Penske (above) both bought partial ownership of NCMS in 1995. Both later entered a bidding war to fully own the track.

In 1995, two businessmen bought partial ownership of NCMS: Speedway Motorsports, Inc. (SMI) founder Bruton Smith bought 24-25% interest from Horris DeWitt in April and motorsports businessman Roger Penske bought "less than 2%" in May. Days after Penske bought partial interest, Smith stated that he wished to completely buy out control of NCMS; in response, majority stockholder Carrie DeWitt stated that she refused to sell her 65% controlling interest for the facility on June 18. Smith later increased his interest in September, buying out Richard Howard and Claude Smith's shares in the facility.

Throughout 1997, Penske and Smith engaged in a bidding war with each other over the purchase and control of NCMS. On April 3, Penske and his company, Penske Motorsports, offered to buy the facility for $29.4 million (adjusted for inflation, $58,964,552). In response, Smith made a counter-offer of $48.3 million (adjusted for inflation, $96,870,336). A week later, Penske increased his offer to "nearly $41 million", obtaining an option to buy out Carrie's interest in NCMS. Despite the offer, Smith stated that Penske's claim of fully purchasing NCMS was "premature", and later increased his offer to $72 million; an offer that Carrie eventually refused due to her fears that the track would be left abandoned like the SMI-owned North Wilkesboro Speedway. In May, Penske announced that he acquired all of Carrie's stock, thus becoming the majority owner of NCMS. However, two months later, NCMS' board of directors recommended merging with SMI, casting doubt on Penske's majority ownership and continuing the dispute into litigation. In November, the North Carolina Business Court dismissed a lawsuit Smith filed against Penske and his company, Penske Motorsports; a month later, Penske Motorsports officially merged with NCMS, placing the facility under Penske's control.

As part of Penske's purchase, in February 1998, the track's name was changed to "North Carolina Speedway". Renovations were also made within the year; the frontstretch grandstands were rebuilt with chairs and the backstretch Hamlet Grandstand was completely replaced with a 28,021-seat grandstand in time for the 1998 AC Delco 400, increasing seating capacity to 60,122. That same year, Smith and 15 shareholders sued Penske in the North Carolina Supreme Court on the argument that the DeWitt family "had to sell to the highest bidder". He additionally asked for Penske to pay him $50 per share for his stock, or $17.7 million total. In May 1999, Penske Motorsports and the France family-owned International Speedway Corporation (ISC) agreed to merge, officially merging two months later under the ISC name. Also in the same year, NCMS' pit road was reconfigured to one singular pit lane and lengthened to 1,436 ft (438 m). In April 2000, the North Carolina Supreme Court determined the stock to be worth $23.47 per share, awarding Smith "more than $3.6 million"; a decision received positively by Penske. Two years later, Jo Wilson stepped down as president of NCMS at the end of the year, with Chris Browning being named as the president in newspaper reports by 2003.

==== Ferko lawsuit, subsequent NASCAR hiatus ====
By the start of 2003, a declining Richmond County economy, lackluster attendance and amenities at North Carolina Speedway compared to other newly built facilities such as Texas Motor Speedway and Kansas Speedway, and NASCAR's prioritization on bigger television and advertising markets put one of its Cup Series weekends in jeopardy. Three months later, The Charlotte Observer stated that the facility's fall race was most likely going to be replaced by Darlington Raceway in order to accommodate a second race at California Speedway; the report was confirmed a month later, with NASCAR stating that the reason was due to lack of fan support and sell-outs. The following year, the ongoing Ferko lawsuit, involving a minority SMI shareholder suing NASCAR and ISC for violating an implied agreement to give Texas Motor Speedway a second Cup Series date placed significant doubt on the retention of the track's only Cup Series weekend due to both the lawsuit and continued attendance woes. On May 14, the lawsuit was settled, giving the facility's remaining date to Texas Motor Speedway. In addition, the facility was bought by Speedway Motorsports for $100.4 million. No NASCAR events were scheduled in the following years, with the track being limited to filming production, NASCAR testing, and driving schools. In later interviews, Rockingham Dragway owner Stephen Earwood stated that SMI "wanted the date; they didn't want the racetrack... it's sad, but times change".

=== Andy Hillenburg purchase, NASCAR's brief return ===
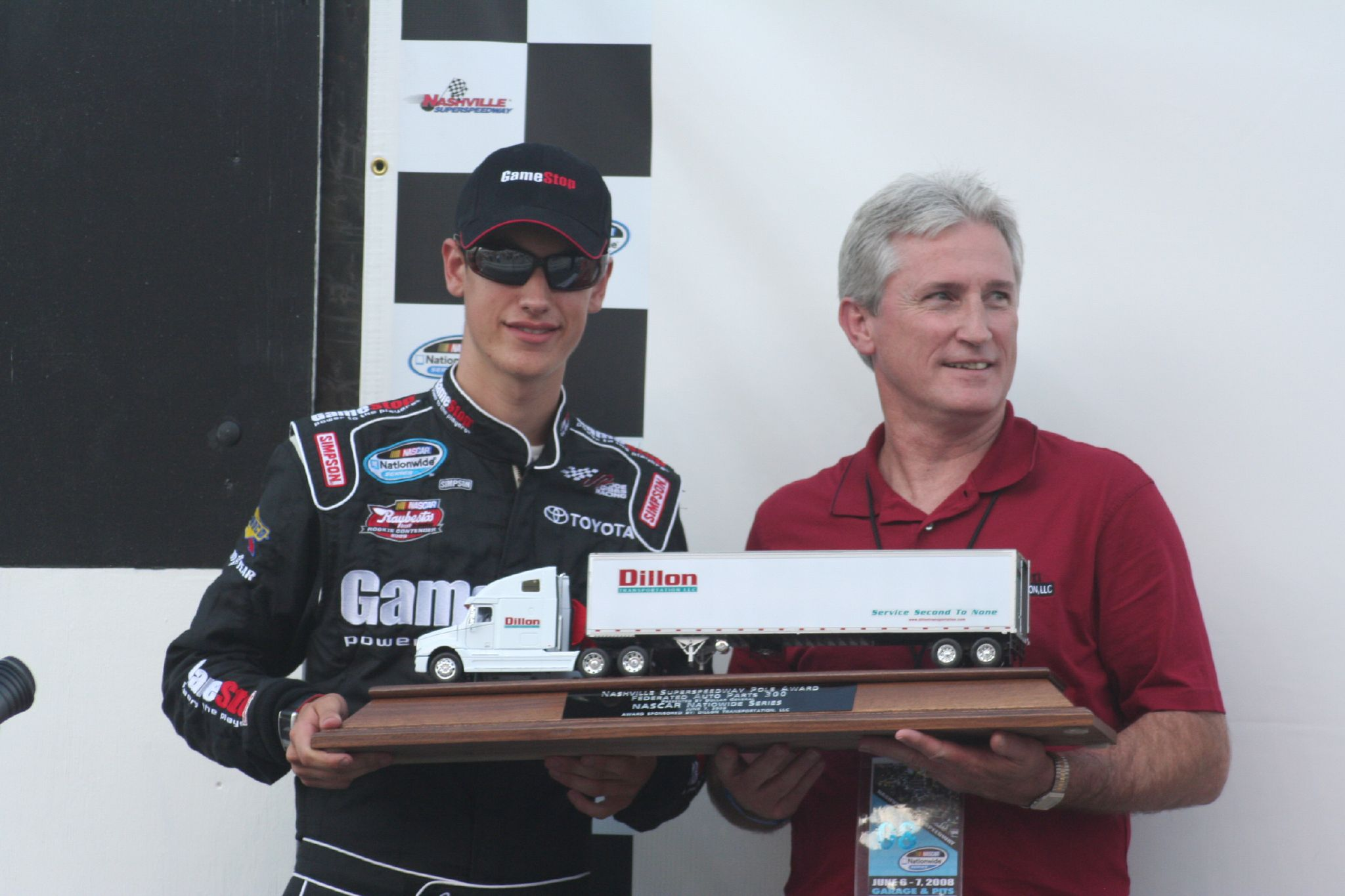
Joey Logano (pictured in 2008) won the first race at Rockingham Speedway after a four-year hiatus of racing in 2008.

On June 20, 2007, SMI spokesman Jerry Gappens stated that the company was planning to put North Carolina Speedway up for auction. Two months later, NASCAR driver Andy Hillenburg stated his intents to enter the auction. Hillenburg was able to win the auction on October 2, putting down a bid of $4.4 million to gain ownership of the facility. With Hillenburg's purchase, the facility was renamed to "Rockingham Speedway". The backstretch grandstands were also removed and were later installed at the ZMax Dragway. A month after the auction, Hillenburg announced the addition of ARCA Re/Max Series races starting in 2008; the first races since NASCAR's departure in 2004. The race ran as scheduled on May 4, with Joey Logano winning the event. Within the year, a new 1/2 mile (0.80 km) oval replicating the Martinsville Speedway was built outside of the main track named "Little Rock", with further plans to construct a dirt track and road course. In November, Little Rock became popular for testing with NASCAR teams after NASCAR banned any testing at any facility NASCAR raced in. ARCA raced at the facility until 2011, when it was dropped from the schedule.

In August 2011, track general manager Robert Ingraham announced plans to install of SAFER barriers at the speedway, causing speculation for potential future lower national division NASCAR races. A month later, Hillenburg announced that Rockingham Speedway would host the third national division NASCAR Truck Series at the facility for the following year, ending an eight-year hiatus of NASCAR racing at the facility. The first testing sessions for Truck Series drivers was held in March, marking the first time any driver from NASCAR's top three series practiced for a race at the facility since NASCAR's initial departure. The race was held on April 15, with Kasey Kahne winning the event. However, NASCAR's return to Rockingham Speedway was brief; after one more Truck Series race in 2013, in October of that year, NASCAR announced its second departure from the track due to "the track fail[ing] to meet its financial obligations".

=== Years of abandon ===
On September 19, 2014, The Charlotte Observer reported that the Richmond County Superior Court approved to hear a motion filed by Salisbury-based Farmers and Merchants Bank to allow The Finley Group to have "immediate and exclusive custody" of the speedway, with the bank claiming that Hillenburg and co-owner Bill Silas owed them "more than $4.5 million". A week later, the Superior Court ruled to let The Finley Group as "managing agent" of the facility, with the bank pursuing to have the track auctioned off instead of foreclosed. In October, the auction was approved, with the deadline set on March 15, 2015. Silas, who claimed in an interview with Moody that he was never a co-owner, stated that hosting Truck Series events was "a complete financial failure... [Rockingham] should have gone on the auction block a long time ago." He also criticized the facility's lack of non-racing events, declaring, "the place is totally underutilized".

Two months before the deadline, disabled veterans charity group Vets-Help expressed interest at buying the facility and turning it into a "reintegration center for veterans". The group set an opening date on July 4 of that same year, and after obtaining a lease set a racing schedule involving several series in 2016. However, by April 2016 and with "absolutely no progress made" according to motorsports journalist Dave Moody, the organization's lease was terminated according to the Richmond County Daily Journal with none of the scheduled races ran. Over a year after its scheduled date, an auction was scheduled for May 5, with Silas and his company BK Rock Holdings placing a credit bid at $3 million. The facility was later put up for sale in November for $3.795 million, with Iron Horse Properties acting as the real estate manager of Rockingham Speedway.

=== Rockingham Properties purchase, second return of NASCAR ===
Rockingham Speedway was bought by a group of investors led by Dan Lovenheim for $2.8 million on August 30, 2018. A week later, Lovenheim released plans to implement renovations and to turn the facility into a multi-use complex focusing on auto racing and music festivals; within the year, plans for a dirt track, originally planned by Hillenburg, were also proposed by the group. The following year, North Carolina Governor Roy Cooper proposed to give $8 million in state funding to help make improvements to the facility. The first major event at the facility since 2013, the Epicenter Festival, took place in May of that year. In 2020, the facility scheduled its first racing event since 2013 with a CARS Tour event in 2021; however, the race was canceled due to a lack of tires from tire supplier Hoosier. Despite the cancellation, Rockingham Speedway was able to hold drifting competitions in 2021; the first motorsports events at the facility since NASCAR's departure.

In May 2021, Cooper proposed a COVID-19 relief package that included $10 million for Rockingham Speedway. The North Carolina General Assembly approved $9 million in November. Track officials soon announced plans to repave the track, which began in October 2022 and finished two months later. After repaving, the track was remeasured at 0.94 mi (1.51 km). By June 2023, renovations to the grandstands and catchfences were completed. NASCAR spokesman Ben Kennedy noted the track had "certainly hit our radar" for a possible return. The infield road course was repaved in early 2024, and on August 29, NASCAR announced it would return in 2025 with Xfinity and Truck Series events. On May 28, 2025, The Charlotte Observer reported that the speedway had been listed for sale again after being owned by the Rockingham Properties group for seven years.

=== International Hot Rod Association purchase ===
On December 31, 2025, the International Hot Rod Association (IHRA) announced their purchase of the facility for an undisclosed price. With their purchase, IHRA owner Darryl Cuttell stated hopes of expanding the facility's racing events and renovations to amenities in press statements.

== Events ==
=== Racing events ===
==== NASCAR ====
Rockingham Speedway formally hosted NASCAR Cup Series races the Subway 400 and the Pop Secret Microwave Popcorn 400. The track also formally hosted the O'Reilly Series' North Carolina Education Lottery 250 and the Truck Series' Black's Tire 200.

==== Other racing events ====
Alongside NASCAR, the track has hosted various other racing series throughout its existence, including USAR Pro Cup and Automobile Racing Club of America (ARCA) races.

=== Non-racing events ===
Rockingham Speedway has held numerous festivals throughout its existence. Its first was on August 18, 1972, when the speedway hosted the Peach Tree Celebration, a rock music festival. Approximately 70,000 attended the event. In recent decades, various festivals have been held, including the Carolina Rebellion in 2012, the Epicenter festival in 2019, and the Tailgate N’ Tallboys festival in 2023.

=== Filming production ===
Rockingham Speedway has been used as a site for filming production for various movies and shows, including Talladega Nights: The Ballad of Ricky Bobby, Days of Thunder, Ta Ra Rum Pum, and the 2011 edition of World's Strongest Man.

== Race lap records ==
As of April 2025, the fastest official race lap records at Rockingham Speedway are listed as:

Category	Time	Driver	Vehicle	Event
D-Shaped Oval (2022–present): 0.940 mi (1.513 km)
ARCA Menards	0:22.847	Brent Crews	Toyota Camry TRD	2025 Rockingham ARCA 125
NASCAR Truck	0:22.912	Corey Heim	Toyota Tundra TRD Pro	2025 Black's Tire 200
NASCAR Xfinity	0:23.267	Jesse Love	Chevrolet Camaro SS	2025 North Carolina Education Lottery 250
