= Mother Feather =

American rock band

Mother Feather is an American rock band from New York City. Formed by vocalist Ann Courtney in 2009, the group also includes keyboardist and vocalist Elizabeth Carena, guitarist Chris Foley, and drummer Gunnar Olsen.

== History and formation ==
Mother Feather was formed in late summer 2009 by Ann Courtney on a weekend trip out of New York City, on which she experienced what she described as a "pop cock rock catharsis", inspiring her to form a band that was "bigger than her everyday self", "harnessed big feelings", "embodied showmanship through commitment and urgency", and was "uplifting and fun".

The name Mother Feather came to Courtney as a fumbled expletive, which she described as a "direct message from my subconscious via a Freudian slip".

Impressed with her performance work in Third Rail Projects, Courtney enlisted her best friend, roommate, and fellow Fordham University at Lincoln Center theater alumnus Carena as her "hype woman/sidekick".

Former bassist Matt Basile, who worked alongside Courtney on staff at Rockwood Music Hall, joined shortly thereafter and the trio enlisted guitarist and long-time friend Chris Foley in the fall of 2009. Gunnar Olsen joined in early 2010 to round out the lineup and by December 2017, Omaha native Seth Ondracek took over on bass.

The band released two independent recordings, the "Mother Feather EP" in 2011 and the "Living Breathing EP" in 2013. On September 14, 2015, it was announced that the band signed to Metal Blade Records and their eponymous debut LP "Mother Feather" would be released on Friday, May 13, 2016, comprising the band's prior EPs with an additional two songs.

Because of Radio 1 Rock Show DJ Daniel P. Carter's enthusiasm for their debut single, "Mother Feather", the band was invited to record a session at the BBC's Maida Vale Studio 4 in March 2016. The band recorded three songs from the album and a previously unreleased song, "I.C.U."

The band performed the entirety of the Vans Warped Tour in the summer of 2016 and at large-scale stadium rock festivals Rock on the Range and Carolina Rebellion in the spring of 2017. According to a March 2017 announcement, Mother Feather entered the studio with Grammy-nominated producer Joshua Valleau to begin production on their second album for Metal Blade. The eclectic and ambitious "Constellation Baby" was released on Nov 2, 2018 on Metal Blade imprint Blacklight Media to positive reviews. Soundblab called the album “as glorious, glittering and multifaceted as the night sky itself.” By 2020, the band reclaimed their independent status with a searing new single, the ferocious revenge fantasy "You're a Dead Man." Two weeks in advance of its worldwide release on October 30, the band leaked the song exclusively on Bandcamp to raise money for the global women's rights organization Madre.

== Reception ==
Mother Feather has been noted in the press for its energetic live shows. The Huffington Post declared it "a great New York City band in the tradition of Great New York City Bands", and The Village Voice called the group "as gritty and New York as it gets". Time Out NY and Metro NY have praised the band for its "bombast" and "showmanship".

== Discography ==
=== EPs and singles ===
- Mother Feather EP, 2011, independent release
- LIVE/FUTURES EP, 2012 independent release
- Living Breathing EP, 2013, independent release
- You're a Dead Man, Single, 2020 independent release

=== Albums ===
- Mother Feather - Metal Blade Records/ Blacklight Media (release date: May 13, 2016)
- Constellation Baby - Metal Blade Records (release date: November 2, 2018)
- KICK3R - Independent release (release date: October 18, 2024)
