= Bourbon & Beyond =

Annual music festival in Louisville, Kentucky

- Genre: Rock, Folk, Pop, Country
- Dates: 4-day weekend in September (currently)
- Locations: Highland Festival Grounds at the Kentucky Exposition Center, Louisville, Kentucky
- Years active: 2017–present
- Attendance: 210,000 (2024, weekend total)
- Organizer: Danny Wimmer Presents
- Website: bourbonandbeyond.com

Bourbon & Beyond is an annual bourbon and music festival that takes place in Louisville, Kentucky, United States. It is known as "The World's Largest Bourbon, Food, & Music Festival". The festival is held the weekend before Louder Than Life at the same venue. Both festivals are produced by Danny Wimmer Presents. The two festivals combined had an estimated impact of $42 million on the local economy in 2024.

== History ==
In 2013, Louisville Mayor Greg Fischer established the Bourbon and Local Food Work Group with the goal of guiding tourism and economic development centered around bourbon and food. The committee published the Bourbon & Food Work Group Report in 2014 with recommendations for the city, including "creating an annual world-class signature Bourbon and Food Festival." Due to a lack of resources and experience with this type of festival, the city gave Danny Wimmer Presents the opportunity to establish a private bourbon festival in Louisville as a result of their success with Louder Than Life. The city provided suggestions for the name and how to celebrate Louisville culture, which the company used to establish Bourbon & Beyond.

The festival began in 2017 as a 2-day weekend festival held at Louisville Champions Park. In 2019, the festival changed to a 3-day festival and moved to Highland Festival Grounds at the Kentucky Exposition Center to prevent flooding.

The 2020 festival was cancelled due to the COVID-19 pandemic and was not held in 2021.

In 2025, major changes to the festival and venue were announced including reworking the layout, adding stages, and adding an entrance. As part of these changes the venue was moved from within the Kentucky Exposition Center south of Phillips Lane to an area adjacent to Freedom Hall and Kentucky Kingdom. Tickets now include free access to a section of Kentucky Kingdom.

== Estimated yearly attendance ==
- 2017: 50,000
- 2018: 25,000 (Day 2 cancelled due to weather)
- 2019: 91,000
- 2020: Cancelled due to the COVID-19 pandemic
- 2021: Not held due to the COVID-19 pandemic
- 2022: 140,000
- 2023: 120,000
- 2024: 210,000
- 2025: TBD
