= Danny Wimmer Presents =

American music-festival production company

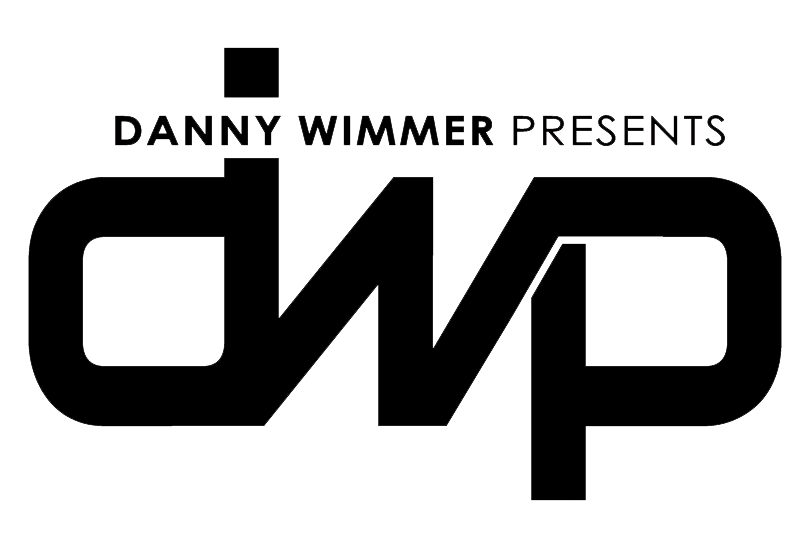
- Industry: Music Festivals, Entertainment
- Founded: 2011
- Founder: Danny Wimmer
- Headquarters: Los Angeles, California
- Website: dannywimmerpresents.com

Danny Wimmer Presents (DWP) is an American music festival production and promotion company headquartered in Los Angeles, California. Focusing primarily on the rock music scene, DWP is one of the smallest high-capacity national promoting companies in the United States and was ranked on Pollstar's Top 100 Promoters Worldwide in 2014 and 2015. Since 2011, DWP has created, developed, and produced events including Rock on the Range, Aftershock, Louder than Life, Welcome to Rockville, Bourbon & Beyond, Golden Sky, Inkcarceration, Carolina Rebellion, Epicenter, and Sonic Temple.

== Background ==
Danny Wimmer, from Jacksonville, Florida, entered the music industry in 1993 by opening a venue named The Milk Bar. In 1995, he let a local band named Limp Bizkit play The Milk Bar, and stayed in contact with their singer Fred Durst as they rose to international fame in the coming years. Wimmer and Durst moved to Los Angeles to launch Flawless Records in 1999. Wimmer later worked at Epic Records and Atlantic Records, where he formed a relationship with AEG Presents, the second largest event promotor in the world. In 2007, Wimmer launched his first festival, Rock on the Range, in Columbus, Ohio. In 2011, he began his own company, Danny Wimmer Presents.

In 2025, CEO Danny Hayes stepped down after a decade. Wimmer bought Hayes' shares. Sources close to the situation say the split was the result of differing strategic focus. While the partnership was long and successful, the decision to go separate ways was ultimately about aligning visions for what comes next.

== Music festivals ==
- Aftershock is a hard rock and heavy metal festival in Sacramento, California.
- Carolina Rebellion was an annual rock music festival held in Concord, North Carolina. Due to a split between DWP and AEG, it was replaced in 2019 by Epicenter. Epicenter was held in Rockingham, North Carolina in 2019. In 2020 it was cancelled due to the pandemic. There are no current plans for Epicenter to return.
- Louder Than Life is a 4 day hard rock and heavy metal festival in Louisville, Kentucky.
- Rock on the Range was a rock music festival in Columbus, Ohio that was co-produced by Danny Wimmer Presents and Live Nation. It was replaced in 2019 by Danny Wimmer Presents with the Sonic Temple Festival.
- Welcome to Rockville is a hard rock and heavy metal music festival in Daytona Beach, Florida.
- Inkcarceration is a hard rock, heavy metal, and tattoo festival held in Mansfield, Ohio at the historic Ohio State Reformatory.
- Bourbon & Beyond is a 4 day music and bourbon festival held in Louisville, Kentucky. The festival is held the weekend prior to Louder than Life at the same location.
- GoldenSky is a multi-day music and beer festival held in Sacramento, California presented by Danny Wimmer Presents and in partnership with Visit Sacramento. The festival held typically the weekend after Aftershock at the same location, Discovery Park. After 3 years, GoldenSky was put on pause for 2025 with plans to return in 2026.
