= Radkey =

American rock band

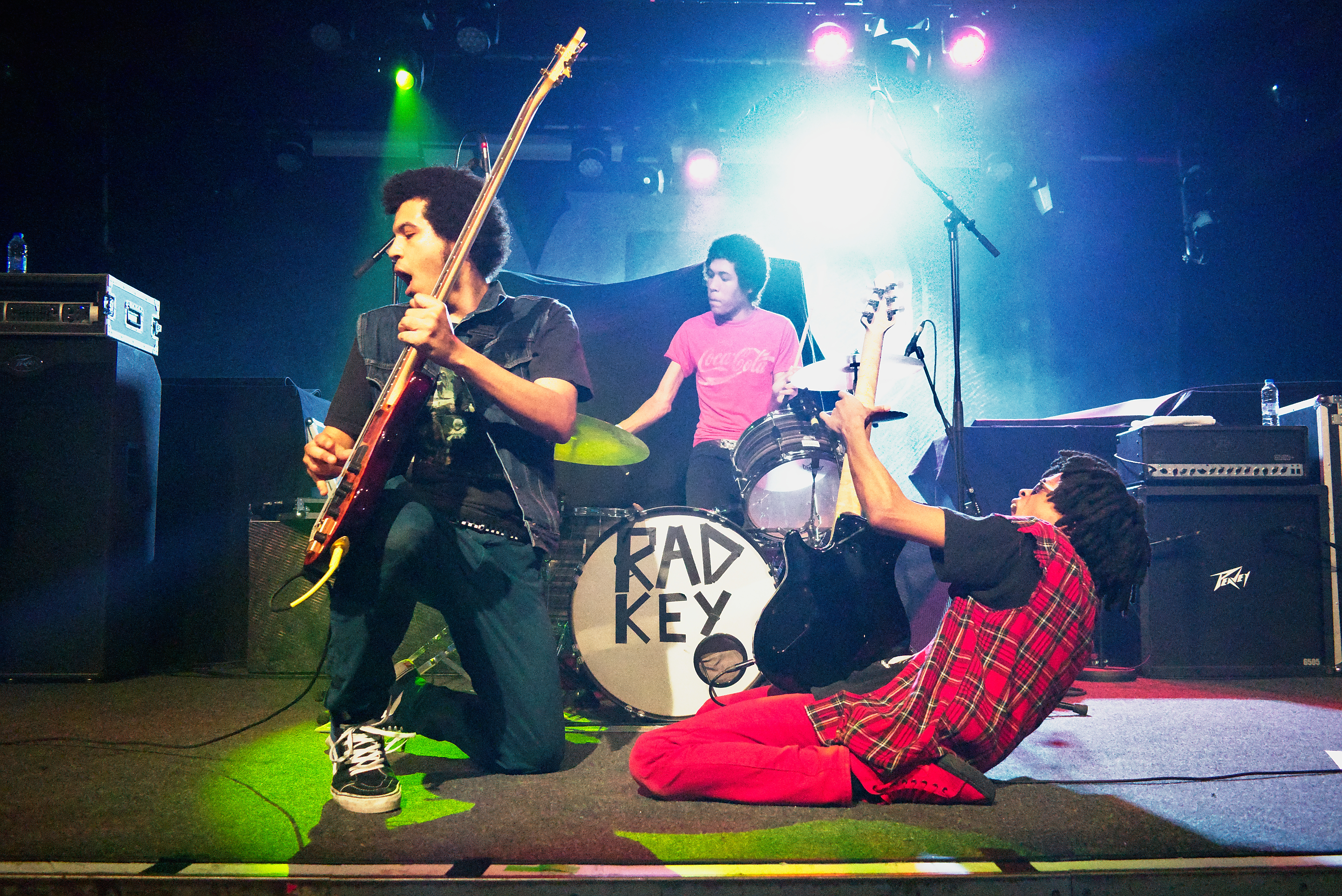
- Radkey performing in Berlin, 2019

Background information
- Origin: St. Joseph, Missouri, U.S.
- Genres: Punk rock; garage rock; garage punk; psychedelic rock
- Years active: 2010–present
- Labels: Wreckroom, Little Man Records, Another Century, Sony RED
- Members: Isaiah Radke; Solomon Radke; Dee Radke
- Website: www.radkey.net

Radkey is an American punk rock band from St. Joseph, Missouri formed in 2010 by brothers, Dee, Solomon, and Isaiah Radke.

== History ==
Radkey consists of three home-schooled brothers from St. Joseph, Missouri. Isaiah Radke (bass), Solomon Radke (drums), and Dee Radke (lead vocals and guitar) who formed their family-titled band in 2010, and played their first show in 2011 when they opened for Fishbone. With their dad, Matt Radke, as their manager, they have since played with the likes of the Foo Fighters, Jack White, Cozy Danger, The Offspring, Descendents, Local H, Black Joe Lewis, Titus Andronicus and performed at festivals like SXSW, Riot Fest, Afropunk, Japan's Punkspring the U.K.’s Download Festival, and Coachella Valley Music and Arts Festival. They have released two EPs since their inception: 2012’s Cat & Mouse with Adrian Grenier’s Wreckroom Records and 2013's Devil Fruit on Little Man Records. The band worked with Ross Orton (Arctic Monkeys, Drenge) to release their latest single, "Feed My Brain" and the team released their debut LP Dark Black Makeup in August 2015 The music video for their song "Glore" was featured near the ending of the episode "Shapes" of Off the Air on Adult Swim. Their debut album was re-released in 2016 under a new name, 'Delicious Rock Noise' and featuring two bonus tracks. In 2020, the group released their follow up album, Green Room.

== Performances ==
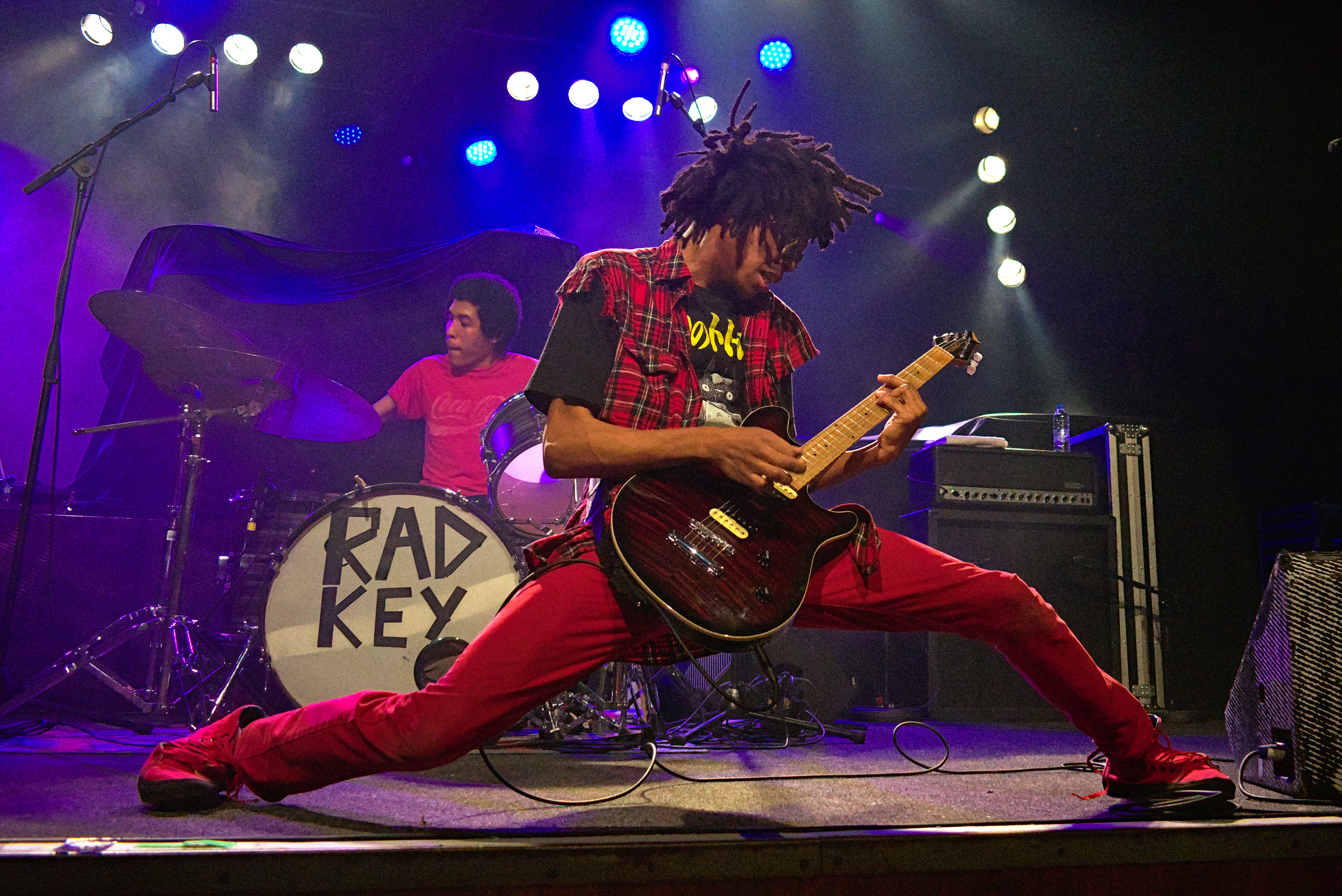
Dee Radke

Radkey's first chance to play Afropunk Fest in 2011 was cancelled due to Hurricane Irene. The band would then return to Brooklyn to play Afropunk in 2012. September 25, 2012 the trio tracked the single and video, Cat & Mouse, for Wreckroom Records. The band had their first Daytrotter session January 30, 2013. Radkey's performances at SXSW 2012 attracts the attention of NY Times reporter Jim McKinley. On April 18, 2013, Radkey releases Spirals & N.I.G.G.A. (Not Okay) on Replay Records single 7" Following SXSW 2013, radio producer for Zane Lowe introduces the music to Zane's program; Zane Lowe debuts two tracks - Spirals and Cat & Mouse on his show May 2, 2013. June 4, 2013 Radkey releases Cat & Mouse EP on Wreckroom Records. Radkey was invited to play at Download Festival in the UK - Summer 2013. While in Europe the band attracted critical press with NME, both in print and online. Radkey then went on to record their second EP, Devil Fruit, with Joel Nanos at Element Studios Kansas City, Missouri. The EP is mixed by Rory Attwell (Palma Violets, The Vaccines). The band then hits the road for their US tour in support of NAAM. September 24, 2013 radkey's video, Romance Dawn, debuts on NME. Directed by Shaun Hamontree (MK12 design crew, video for Common 'Go', Jack White & Alicia Keys 'Another Way to Die', Title design for Quantum of Solace, The Kite Runner and Stranger than Fiction).

October 1, 2013 the band appeared on Jools Holland to perform Out Here in My Head. The trio continued touring in late 2013 in support of Drenge, Black Joe Lewis and Red Fang. Following their tour, the band recorded their latest single, Feed My Brain, and the track, Digging the Grave, with Justin Mantooth at Westend Studio, KC, MO - mixed by Ross Orton. In early 2014 Radkey was featured in a print edition of NME. In fall of 2014 Radkey went on tour with Rise Against and Touché Amoré

The band toured in Europe and North America through 2015. The band predominantly toured North America through 2016. The band played at Rock on the Range festival in Columbus, Ohio in May 2017. In summer of 2018 Radkey went on tour with Jack White. In late 2018 they toured with British punk rock and psychedelic band The Damned.

== Members ==
- Dee Radke - lead vocals, guitars
- Isaiah Radke - bass, backing vocals
- Solomon Radke - drums, backing vocals

== Discography ==
=== LPs ===
- Delicious Rock Noise (2016)
- Green Room (2020)
- Bedroom Sand (2026)

=== EPs ===
- Irrationally Yours (2011)
- Cat & Mouse (2013)
- Devil Fruit (2013)
- No Strange Cats (2019)

=== Singles ===
- "Mind Ride" / "Where Do You Stand" (2011)
- "Romance Dawn" (2013)
- "Feed My Brain" (2014)
- "Romance Dawn (UNKLE Reconstruction)" (2014)
- "Dark Black Makeup" (2015)
- "Marvel" (2016)
- "Not Smart" (2016)
- "You Can't Judge a Book by the Cover" (2017)
- "Basement" (2018)
- "St. Elwood" (2018)
- "Rock & Roll Homeschool" (2018)
- "Junes" (2018)
- "Portraits" (2019)
- "Bend" (2020)
- "Ain't No Sunshine" (2020)
- "Seize" (2020)
- "Underground" (2020)
- "I'll Stick Around" (2021)
- "Games (Tonight)" (2022)
- "Better Than This" (2022)
- "Strays" (2024)

== Awards and nominations ==
2016: Berlin Music Video Awards, nominated in the Most Trashy category for 'GLORE'
