= Paper Tongues =

American alternative rock band

- Origin: Charlotte, North Carolina
- Genres: Alternative rock
- Years active: 2007–2018
- Label: Am & Octone Records
- Members: Aswan North
- Past members: Jordan Hardee; Clayton Simon; Cody Blackler; Devin Forbes; Danny Santell; Joey Signa; Luke Anderson

Paper Tongues is an American alternative rock band from Charlotte, North Carolina. The band currently consists of Aswan North (lead vocals). Their sound is described as fusing rock n' roll melodies with beats, and elements of sound. Their debut album was released on March 30, 2010.

== History ==
=== Beginnings, debut album (2007–2012) ===
The group formed in 2007 in Charlotte, North Carolina, when a few musicians with very different musical backgrounds met in Charlotte and ultimately decided to form a band. After meeting producer Brian West, and being invited to Los Angeles to work with him, Paper Tongues front-man Aswan North had a chance encounter with legendary musician-producer Randy Jackson in an L.A. restaurant, Jackson soon became the manager of the band.

Since these events, Paper Tongues has toured with bands such as Jet, Switchfoot, Our Lady Peace, Flyleaf, Linkin Park, etc., as well as co-headlined their own tour with the Neon Trees, Civil Twilight, & the Crash Kings. Paper Tongues has also opened a Vegas show for Cage the Elephant & Muse. They have also appeared on George Lopez's Lopez Tonight and Late Night with Jimmy Fallon.

Their song "Get Higher" is featured on the 2012 season of Fox Television's hit show, "American Idol"

Their song "Soul" is featured on Halogen TV's Fall 2010 promo video.

On Saturday February 12, 2011 they served as the headliners for WFLZ's popular "Meet Ball" concert in Tampa, FL.

They opened for Linkin Park during the A Thousand Suns Tour for their shows in Dallas, Houston, and Phoenix.

=== Rockmen Music Group, Crowd Surfing EP (2012–2013) ===
On May 11, 2012 their single "Amen" was released to Tampa radio stations WSUN and WHPT (via Bubba the Love Sponge), as well as Charlotte station WEND.

On May 30, 2012 Paper Tongues posted on Twitter saying their new song "who I am" was currently in the mixing stages.

On June 9, 2012 Paper Tongues posted on Facebook stating "Just finished our first month in the studio and met our goal of completing a 5-song ep! Can't wait for you all to hear it!!!! Thanks for all the support." Confirming this is in fact an ep and not a full-length album in the progress, however does not deny possibilities of a second full length being on the horizon.

=== Second full-length album (2013–present) ===
Paper Tongues confirmed full length in the works via Twitter "Breakfast at Zada Jane's, now headed to the studio to work on preproduction for the full length. Back to work!!!" However, the new album/EP was never released.

== Discography ==
=== Studio albums ===
- Paper Tongues (March 30, 2010), (No. 110 Billboard 200)

=== EPs ===
- Ride to California EP (2009)
- Crowd Surfing EP (2012) Rockmen Music Group

=== Singles ===
Year	Song	Peak chart positions		Album
Year	Song	US Alt	US Rock	Album
2009	"Ride to California"	22	45	Paper Tongues
2010	"Trinity"	29	—	Paper Tongues
2010	"Get Higher"	36	—	Paper Tongues
2012	"Amen"	—	—	iTunes Single
2018	"Explosion"	—	—	—N/a
