= Reignwolf =

Canadian indie rock band

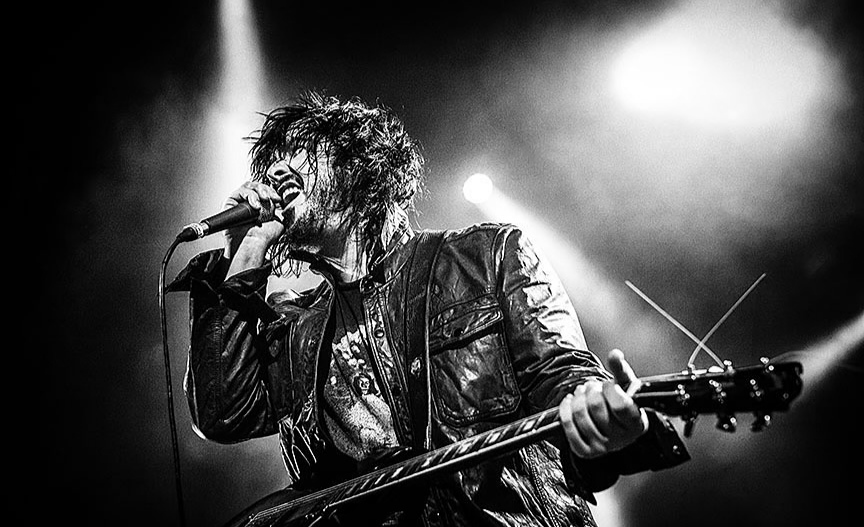
- Reignwolf performing in 2024

Background information
- Origin: Saskatoon, Saskatchewan
- Genres: Indie rock; blues rock
- Years active: 2011–present
- Label: Independent
- Members: Jordan Cook; Joseph Braley; Stacey James Kardash
- Past members: David Rapaport
- Website: reignwolf.com

Reignwolf is a Canadian indie and blues rock trio from Saskatoon, Saskatchewan. It consists of vocalist and guitarist Jordan Cook, bassist Stacey James Kardash, and drummer Joseph Braley. They are known for their hit 2013 single "Are You Satisfied?"

== History ==
In late 2011, guitarist/vocalist Jordan Cook moved to Seattle, Washington, from Saskatoon, Saskatchewan, where he was introduced to David "Stitch" Rapaport and Joseph Braley from the band the Mothers Anger. Cook formed the band Reignwolf and invited Rapaport and Braley to join him.

In August 2013, after more than a full year of nonstop touring, the band released their first single, "Are You Satisfied?", the same day they performed at Lollapalooza. Later that year, they announced they had been selected as the direct support act on Black Sabbath's 2014 North American tour. Two more singles followed ("In the Dark" and "Lonely Sunday"), and Reignwolf was declared one of "10 New Artists You Need to Know" by Rolling Stone in January 2014.

The band played their final show of the year on New Year's Eve, December 31, 2014, at the Showbox in Seattle. In 2015, Reignwolf signed with Stardog Records under the Republic/UMG umbrella and went into the studio to write and record their debut album. During that time, they appeared in the episode "What Would Phil Do?" of Cameron Crowe's Showtime series Roadies.

Released on February 1, 2019, "Black and Red" was the first single from Hear Me Out, which came out on March 1, 2019.

On June 17, 2022, Reignwolf released the single "The Woods" with Rage Against the Machine drummer Brad Wilk.

== Discography ==
Studio albums

- Hear Me Out (2019)

Singles

- "Are You Satisfied?" (2013)
- "In the Dark" (2013)
- "Lonely Sunday" (2014)
- "Hardcore" (2016)
- "Wanna Don't Wanna" (2018)
- "Black and Red" (2019)
- "Over & Over" (2019)
- "Ritual" (2019)
- "Keeper" (2019)
- "Cabin Fever" (2020)
- "The Woods" feat. Brad Wilk (2022)
