= Kyng (band) =

Hard rock band from Los Angeles

Background information
- Origin: Los Angeles, California, United States
- Genres: Stoner metal
- Years active: 2008–present
- Labels: Razor & Tie, Realid
- Members: Eddie Veliz; Pepe Clarke
- Past members: Tony Castaneda

Kyng is a Los Angeles–based stoner metal band consisting of Eddie Veliz (vocals, guitar), Tony Castaneda (bass, backup vocals), and Pepe Clarke (drums). The group formed in 2008 and their debut release, Trampled Sun, was released on September 27, 2011, on Realid Records. The band signed to Razor & Tie Records in August 2013 and the trio released their second album, Burn The Serum, on April 15, 2014. Burn The Serum was recorded at Grandmaster Recorders LTD and Sword & Shield in Hollywood, California, and Studio 606 in Northridge, California. James Rota and Andrew Alekel co-produced the album. Rota is known for Fireball Ministry while Alekel is known for his work on Foo Fighters and Queens of the Stone Age recordings. The band released their third full-length studio album, Breathe in the Water, on October 7, 2016, on Razor & Tie Records.
In an interview with Noisecreep, Eddie explains that the band might not have existed if it weren't for their persistence.

"What is crazy about Kyng is that it was my last hurrah," admits Veliz. "You know, I had a steady job doing my thing. Tony (Castaneda, bass) and I had always talked about getting another band together and it was a side project for a moment but as we started writing music, it just kept getting better and better and we decided that we should try to play in front of people instead of just sitting around. We went at it, stuck to our guns and it started to snowball into a tiny machine that is getting bigger."

The band has toured with Megadeth, Static-X, Saliva, Trivium, Danzig, Clutch, Seether, Papa Roach and Black Label Society. They also performed at Metallica's Orion Music + More Festival in 2012.

From Trampled Sun, the singles "Falling Down" and "I Don't Believe" hit numbers 30 and 35 on the Mainstream Rock chart in 2011 and 2012, respectively. From Burn the Serum, the single "Electric Halo" hit number 25 on the Mainstream Rock chart in 2014. Non-charting singles include "Bleed Easy" from Trampled Sun, and "Self-Medicated Man" and "Sewn Shut" from Burn the Serum.

Breathe in the Water hit number 13 on the Heatseekers Albums chart and number 20 on the Hard Rock Albums chart.

In 2016, the band issued a cease and desist letter towards the rapper Kyyngg over his name, which had previously been spelled the same way as the band's.

== Discography ==
=== Studio albums ===
- Trampled Sun (2011)
- Burn the Serum (2014)
- Breathe in the Water (2016)
- Beyond the Dead Woods (2021)
