= Otherwise (band) =

American hard rock band

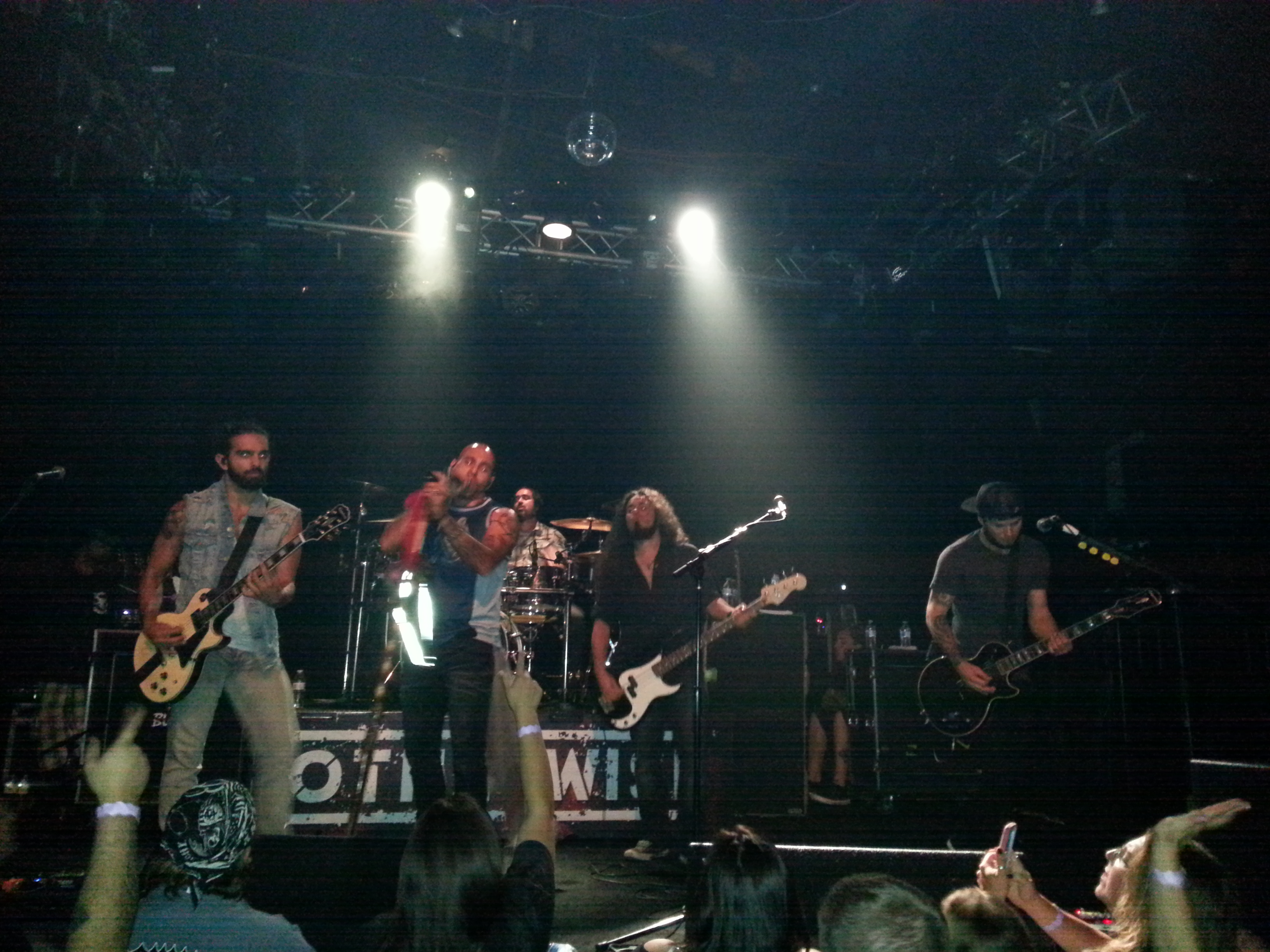

Background information
- Origin: Las Vegas, Nevada
- Genres: Hard rock, post-grunge, alternative metal
- Years active: 2003–present
- Labels: Century Media, Mascot Records
- Members: Adrian Patrick; Ryan Patrick; Joe Conner; Sean Fitz
- Past members: Tony "The Beast" Carboney; Flavio Ivan Mendoza; Don DW King; Vassilios Metropoulos; Corky Gainsford; Andrew Pugh; Jason Juadines; Ted Carrasco; Joe Hardy; Nick Bedrosian; Ray Kemple; Alan Doucette; Dave McMahan; Brian Medeiros
- Website: otherwisemusic.com

Otherwise is an American hard rock band from Las Vegas, Nevada. They have released five full-length albums.

== Career ==
Otherwise released a self-title album in 2006, independently. Their song "Soldiers" charted at #1 on Sirius XM Octane. They signed with Sony Music-owned label Century Media Records and released three albums: True Love Never Dies (2012), Peace at All Costs (2014), Sleeping Lions (2017), and Defy (2019). Their 2023 album Gawdzillionaire was released on Mascot Records.

== Members ==
Current members

- Adrian Patrick – lead vocals (2003–present)
- Ryan Patrick – lead guitar, backing vocals (2004–present)
- Joe Conner – drums (2019–present)
- Sean Fitz - Bass (2023–Present)

Former members

- Ted Carrasco – rhythm guitar (2003–2007)
- Ray Kemple – bass (2004)
- Alan Doucette – drums (2004–2007)
- Nick Bedrosian – bass, backing vocals (2019–2022)
- Don "DW" King – bass, backing vocals (2004–2007)
- Radley Griego – bass (2007)
- Walker Warren – rhythm guitar (2007)
- Jason Juadines – rhythm guitar, backing vocals (2007–2010)
- Flavio Ivan Mendoza – bass, backing vocals (2007–2012)
- Dave McMahan – drums, backing vocals (2007–2010)
- Corky Gainsford – drums, backing vocals (2010–2015)
- Vassilios Metropolous – rhythm guitar (2011–2012), bass (2012–2014), backing vocals (2011–2014)
- Andrew Pugh – rhythm guitar, backing vocals (2012–2015)
- Tony "The Beast" Carboney – bass guitar, backing vocals (2015–2019)
- Brian Medeiros – drums (2016–2019)
- Joe Hardy – lead guitar (1998–2003)
- Ray Kemple – bass (2000–2003)

== Discography ==
=== Studio albums ===
Title	Details	Peak chart positions			
Title	Details	US	US Independent	US Rock	US Heat
Otherwise	Released: October 5, 2006; Label: Independent; Formats: CD, digital download	—	—	—	—
True Love Never Dies	Released: May 8, 2012; Label: Century, Mascot; Formats: CD, digital download	123	18	10	2
Peace at All Costs	Released: September 16, 2014; Label: Century; Formats: CD, digital download	49	10	5	—
Sleeping Lions	Released: September 22, 2017; Label: Century; Formats: CD, digital download	—	30	—	—
Defy	Released: November 8, 2019; Label: Mascot; Formats: CD, digital download, streaming	—	—	—	—
Gawdzillionaire	Released: March 10, 2023; Label: Mascot; Formats: CD, digital download, streaming	—	—	—	—

=== Extended plays ===
Title	Details
Some Kind of Alchemy EP	Released: December 7, 2009; Label: Independent; Formats: CD, digital download
Enjoy the Pain EP	Released: October 31, 2013; Label: Century; Formats: digital download
From the Roots: Vol. 1	Released: October 28, 2016; Label: Another Century; Formats: digital download
From the Roots: Vol. 2 EP	Released: July 13, 2018; Label: Independent; Formats: digital download

=== Singles ===
Year	Song	Peak chart positions				Certifications	Album
Year	Song	Rock Airplay	US Act. Rock	US Rock	US Main.	Certifications	Album
2011	"Soldiers"	41	17	41	20	RIAA: Gold	True Love Never Dies
2012	"I Don't Apologize (1000 Pictures)"	37	13	—	16		True Love Never Dies
2013	"Die for You"	—	23	—	26		True Love Never Dies
2014	"Darker Side of the Moon"	—	16	—	19		Peace at All Costs
2015	"Coming for the Throne"	—	16	—	18		Peace at All Costs
2017	"Angry Heart"	—	—	—	—		Sleeping Lions
2019	"Lifted"	—	—	—	27		Defy
2019	"Bad Trip"	—	—	—	—		Defy
2020	"Run Rudolph Run"	—	—	—	—		Non-album single
2021	"Halo"	—	—	—	—		Defy
2021	"Silver & Black"	—	—	—	—		Defy
2022	"Full Disclosure"	—	—	—	24		Gawdzillionaire
2022	"Exit Would	—	—	—	—		Gawdzillionaire
2022	"Coffins"	—	—	—	—		Gawdzillionaire
2022	"New Way to Hate"	—	—	—	—		Gawdzillionaire
2024	"Bow To Your Kings"	—	—	—	—		Non-album single
2024	"Crossfire (Feat. Hyro The Hero [Acoustic]"	—	—	—	—		Non-album single
2025	"Lighthouse (The Churko Sessions)"	—	—	—	—		Non-album single
2025	"Permanent Vacation"	—	—	—	—		Non-album single
2025	"Stop, Drop, & Roll (Doesn't Work In Hell) "	—	—	—	—		Some Kind Of Alchemy -EP
