= Wilson (band) =

- Origin: East Lansing, Michigan, United States
- Genres: Hard rock, alternative rock
- Years active: 2010–2019
- Labels: Sony RED
- Members: Chad Nicefield; Jason Spencer; Kyle Landry; James Lascu; Matt Puhy
- Website: www.wilsonpartyanimals.com

Wilson was a five-piece rock band from East Lansing, Michigan, United States. The band formed in 2010 when founding member Jason Spencer was attending Michigan State University. Vocalist Chad Nicefield joined in late 2010. They released three full studio albums: Full Blast Fuckery (2013), Right to Rise (2015) and Tasty Nasty (2018). The band also released an EP in 2010 named Standing On The Reel under a different lineup, besides Jason Spencer. Wilson’s final lineup comprised Chad Nicefield (vocals), Jason Spencer (guitar), Kyle Landry (guitar), James Lascu (bass) and Matt Puhy (drums).

== Early years - Full Blast Fuckery (2013) ==
Wilson entered the studio in early 2013 to release what would be their first full studio album following the 2010 EP Standing On The Reel. The album was co-produced and engineered by Shane D. Grush and Steve Evetts, and mixed by Grant Mohrman and Evetts. It was released through Easy Killer Records in the US, and New Damage Records in Canada.

Music videos were released in support of the album, with single video releases for the songs "College Gangbang", "Strictly Doods (Better Off), and "If You Ever Leave Me...". "Better Off" received airtime and video plays in the UK on Scuzz TV, Kerrang!, and Team Rock radio.

Reviews for the album were positive, with particular praise for the high energy and "balls-out nature" of the album. Greg Kennelty of Metal Injection wrote, "In short, Full Blast Fuckery is the album you put on when everyone's at the party and you've opened the first twenty-something beers with every intention of destroying the place".

In support of the album, the band spent the majority of 2013 and 2014 on the road across the US with artists such as Gwar, Jason Newsted, Scorpion Child and The Greenery.

The band released Full Blast Fuckery in the UK on July 7, 2014, with the first ever vinyl record releases of the album.

== Right To Rise (2015) ==
In early 2015, Wilson took some time off from touring and headed back to the studio in preparation for the recording of their second album.

Upon the album's completion, Wilson went to the UK and mainland Europe in March for their first tour of these parts in support of Halestorm alongside Nothing More and The Fallen State (on limited dates). During this time, the band released their first song from the upcoming album Right To Rise, "Hang With The Devil". The band also announced that they had signed a record deal with Razor & Tie Records, with the new album being released on June 29, 2015.

In support of Right To Rise, Wilson embarked on their first headline UK tour in early 2016, with support coming from Devon-based Reigning Days.

In September 2016, the band featured on the cover CD of Metal Hammer's 30-year anniversary issue, with a worldwide exclusive cover of Rage Against The Machine's "Sleep Now In The Fire".

== Tasty Nasty and disbandment (2018–2019) ==
In May 2018, Wilson performed at the Rock On The Range festival in Columbus, Ohio with a new look and appearance, debuting previously unreleased material. Following this show, the band announced the details of their long-awaited third album, Tasty Nasty, to be released August 24, produced by the band and Scott Stevens (Sixx A.M, Papa Roach, Nothingmore). The album also saw the band separate from Razor and Tie, releasing instead via Sony RED music.

In an interview with Blabbermouth, frontman Chad Nicefield spoke of the stylistic changes in the upcoming release, stating, "I just kind of realized who we are as people and our DNA was that of a bunch of lovable, silly dudes, that love to make music."

The announcement also coincided with the release of the first single from the album, "Like A Baller", accompanied by a music video produced and directed by Raymond Rivard and lead singer, Chad Nicefield. The song was dubbed a "reflective introspection" of the adventures of a parking valet.

The band also embarked on a tour in support of Theory Of A Deadman across the summer, along with some festival appearances, including Rock Fest. During this tour, the band released two new singles from the upcoming album, "Dumptruck" and "Fuck Up My High".

In late 2018, Wilson supported Steel Panther on nine shows across the Midwest.

In July 2019, Wilson announced guitarist Kyle Landry is leaving the band to pursue a new career and to be home with his wife and family.

On November 6, 2019, Wilson announced that their final live show would be December 28, 2019.

== Discography ==
=== Studio albums ===
- Full Blast Fuckery (2013)
- Right To Rise (2015)
- Tasty Nasty (2018)

=== Extended plays ===
- Standing On The Reel EP (2010)

=== Singles ===
- "Right To Rise" (2015) - Mainstream Rock Songs No. 22
- "Like A Baller" (2018) - Mainstream Rock Songs No. 35

== Band members ==
- Chad Nicefield - vocals
- Jason Spencer - lead guitar
- Kyle Landry - guitar, vocals
- James Lascu - bass, vocals
- Matt Puhy - drums
