= X-Fest =

Annual music festival in the United States

- Genre: Alternative rock; hard rock; industrial rock; heavy metal; grunge
- Dates: Various
- Locations: San Diego, California, Noblesville, Indiana, Baton Rouge, Louisiana, Dayton, Ohio, Pittsburgh, Pennsylvania, Huntington, West Virginia, Cleveland, Ohio, Fayetteville, Arkansas, Somerset, Wisconsin, Tucson, Arizona
- Years active: 1995–present

X-Fest is an annual music festival held in various venues throughout the United States by Clear Channel Communications radio stations. It features alternative rock, hard rock, heavy metal, grunge, and industrial rock bands.

== Noblesville, Indiana ==
The event is hosted by radio station X103 of Indianapolis and has been held since 1995 at the Klipsch Music Center (previously the Verizon Wireless Music Center and Deer Creek Amphitheater), about 25 miles northeast of downtown Indianapolis in the suburb of Noblesville. Since its inception, the Indianapolis-Noblesville X-Fest has drawn about a quarter million people.

=== Lineups ===
1995: Bush, Weezer, No Doubt, Sponge, Fig Dish, Neena Foundry, Teenage Fanclub, Toadies, Quicksand, Birdmen of Alcatraz, Johnny Socko, Letters to Cleo, Sugar Ray, Ned's Atomic Dustbin, Material Issue, 15 Minutes

1996: Super 8, Reacharound, Goldfinger, the Nixons, Prong, Spacehog, Seven Mary Three, Everclear, the Why Store, No Doubt, the Verve Pipe

1997: Bloodhound Gang, Matchbox Twenty, Sugar Ray, The Vents, Artificial Joy Club, Local H, Gravity Kills, Wilco, The Why Store, Better Than Ezra, Reel Big Fish

1998: Our Lady Peace, Limp Bizkit, Marcy Playground, Stabbing Westward, Third Eye Blind, Creed, Athenaeum, Eve 6, Black Lab, Sprung Monkey

1999: Kid Rock, Everclear, Powerman 5000, Fear Factory, Oleander, The Verve Pipe, Buckcherry, Loudmouth, Pennywise, Push Down & Turn

2000: Stone Temple Pilots, Green Day, Fuel, Wheatus, Papa Roach, P.O.D., Disturbed, Kittie, Kottonmouth Kings, Vallejo

2001: Rammstein, Live, Days of the New, Better Than Ezra, Lifehouse, Zoo Story, Linkin Park, Static-X, Mudvayne, Nonpoint, Saliva
Toadies were originally scheduled to play 2nd on the second stage, but they broke up days before the concert, therefore Nonpoint stepped in and took their place.

2002: Kid Rock, Stone Temple Pilots, Earshot, Uncle Kracker, Trust Company, Chevelle, Breaking Benjamin, Extra Blue Kind, Static-X, Birdmen of Alcatraz,

2003: Godsmack, Seether, Alien Ant Farm, Violent Femmes, Eve 6, Mudvayne, Powerman 5000, Smile Empty Soul, Ill Niño, SR-71

2004: Linkin Park, Korn, Snoop Dogg, The Used, Less Than Jake, Ghostface Killah, M.O.P., Funeral for a Friend, downset.

2005: Disturbed, Fuel, Shinedown, Smile Empty Soul, Cold, Ill Niño, 10 Years, Megan McCauley

2006: Godsmack, Rob Zombie, Shinedown, Buckcherry, Bullet for My Valentine, Alien Ant Farm, Eighteen Visions, The Classic Crime

2007: The Smashing Pumpkins, Fuel, Hurt, Alter Bridge, Another Animal, Black Light Burns, Sick Puppies, A Band Called Pain, The Bravery

2008: Buckcherry, Puddle of Mudd, Candlebox, Bullet for My Valentine, Apocalyptica, Trapt, Hinder

2009: Alice in Chains, Hollywood Undead, Hurt, Red, Sick Puppies, Framing Hanley, Cavo, Cage the Elephant

2010: Buckcherry, Sublime with Rome, Seether, Papa Roach, Drowning Pool, Dirty Heads, Haste the Day, Red Line Chemistry

2011: Avenged Sevenfold, Three Days Grace, Seether, Bullet for My Valentine, Escape The Fate, Sevendust, Black Tide, Art of Dying, Hell Or Highwater (Uproar Festival), Noctura, and Velero

2012 (Day 1): Cake, Metric, The Wombats, others TBA

2012 (Day 2): Shinedown, Godsmack, Staind, Adelitas Way, P.O.D., Fozzy, Redlight King, Deuce, Cruz, Candlelight Red, Mindset Evolution, Within Reason, 7 Days Away, Uncrowned

Papa Roach, scheduled between Staind and Adelitas Way, canceled due to vocalist Jacoby Shaddix needing surgery to remove a nodule on his left vocal cord.

2013: Alice in Chains, Jane's Addiction, Coheed and Cambria, Circa Survive, Walking Papers, Middle Class Rut, New Politics, The Dead Daisies, Danko Jones, The Virginmarys

2014: Godsmack, Seether, Skillet, Pop Evil, Buckcherry, Escape The Fate, Within Reason, 3 Years Hollow, Sons of Revelry, battle band winner.

== Dayton, Ohio ==
Formerly known as "Edge-Fest" when 103.9 was "The Edge". Became X-Fest in 1998 when 103.9 became "The X". Held at the University of Dayton Arena from 1996 to 1999. Held at the Montgomery County Fairgrounds by WXEG since 2000.

=== Lineups ===
1996: Seven Mary Three, Poe, Guided by Voices, The Verve Pipe, Howlin Maggie, A Flock of Seagulls, Magnapop, Van Gogh's Daughter

1997: Matthew Sweet, Veruca Salt, The Refreshments, Kara's Flowers, Sponge, Jars of Clay, K's Choice, Plumb, Puzzle Gut

1998: The Fixx, Better Than Ezra, Everything, Reel Big Fish, Agents of Good Roots, Candlebox, K's Choice, The Urge, Sprung Monkey

1999: Citizen King, Joydrop, Men at Work, Guided by Voices, Fuel, The Verve Pipe, Fastball, Jimmie's Chicken Shack

2000: Due to birthday bash there was no X-Fest

2001: Stroke 9, Transmatic, Jettingham, 8stops7, Tantric, American Hi-Fi, The Calling, Leo

2002: Sevendust, Filter, The Union Underground, Stroke 9, Seether, Audiovent, Goldfinger, Chevelle, Sinch, and Jeremiah Freed

2003: Mudvayne, Cold, Seether, Powerman 5000, Eve 6, Smile Empty Soul, Shinedown, Three Days Grace, V Shape Mind, and Sloth

2004: Puddle of Mudd, Saliva, Shinedown, Smile Empty Soul, Breaking Benjamin, Future Leaders of the World, Crossfade, Finger Eleven, Silvertide, and Earshot

2005: Seether, Papa Roach, Crossfade, 10 Years, Cold, Theory of a Deadman, Hawthorne Heights, Dark New Day, Day of Fire, and Thirty Seconds to Mars

2006: Staind, Avenged Sevenfold, Three Days Grace, Buckcherry, Hinder, Bullet for My Valentine, Hurt, Damone, Black Stone Cherry, Eighteen Visions

2007: Three Days Grace, Chevelle, Breaking Benjamin, Sum 41, Seether, Flyleaf, Finger Eleven, Sick Puppies, Evans Blue, Fair to Midland plus Battle for X-Fest 2007 winners Fluwid, Ithika, and Disagreed.

2008: Hinder, Puddle of Mudd, Buckcherry, 10 Years, Shinedown, Candlebox, Saving Abel, Five Finger Death Punch, Theory of a Deadman, Red, Black Tide, plus Battle for X-Fest 13 winners Chapter of Progress, Seconds Fall, Hollows End, and Felix Tucker. (Avenged Sevenfold was going to play this year but due to Matt "Shadows" Sanders' illness, they had to cancel all their September tour dates. Red blew a tire on the way to the show, and was scheduled to play later on the local stage, but never did. Also, because of high winds due to Hurricane Ike, X-fest 13 was cut short (after Candlebox and before Shinedown). As a result, WXEG traded X-Fest tickets for free tickets to the Jägermeister Tour and half-price vouchers for X-Fest 2K9.)

2009: Alice in Chains, Mudvayne, Our Lady Peace, Hollywood Undead, Cage the Elephant, Hurt, Red, Cavo, Sick Puppies, and Halestorm, plus local bands Three Barrel, Chapter of Progress, Hazard Perry, Shamus Stone, and Hollows End.

2010: Shinedown, Seether, Papa Roach, Sublime with Rome, Drowning Pool, Dirty Heads, Red Line Chemistry, Paper Tongues, American Bang, Janus. As per a release on WXEG. Sublime with Rome pulled out and were replaced with Sick Puppies.

2011: Staind, Theory of a Deadman, Five Finger Death Punch, Alter Bridge, Skillet, Adelitas Way, Kopek, Black Stone Cherry, Emphatic, Downplay

2012: Seether, Sick Puppies, 10 Years, Dropkick Murphys, Filter, Pop Evil, Falling in Reverse, Kyng, Young Guns, Dangerkids, Xfest 2012 was cancelled officially on 8/28/2012 following poor ticket sales, and has not been held in Dayton since.

== San Diego, California ==
Hosted by XTRA at Qualcomm Stadium.

Held at Concerts On The Green at Qualcomm Stadium, (2006–2008) (2017–present).

Held at Sleep Train Amphitheatre, (2010–2016).

=== Lineups ===
2006: The Cult, Dashboard Confessional, Franz Ferdinand, Panic! at the Disco, The Sounds, Echo & the Bunnymen, She Wants Revenge, Hard-Fi, the noise, Reeve Oliver, The Stranger's Six

2007: Sum 41, Social Distortion, Thirty Seconds to Mars, The Bravery, Silversun Pickups, The Used, Amelie, Arm the Angels, Every Thirteen Days, Fight Fair, Four Minutes Til Midnight, The New Addiction, The Paper Dolls, The Power Chords, Sayvinyl, Secret Apollo, The Skank Agents, The Stranger's Six, The Material, Tragedy and Triumph, The Transit War, Two Word Name, White Apple Tree, Yesterdays Rising, Vanity Affair

2008: The Offspring, Pennywise, Jimmy Eat World, MGMT, Ludo, My American Heart, The Material, Weatherbox, The Burning of Rome, The Sess, Shark Attack

2010: 311, The Offspring, Cake, Unwritten Law, Pepper, Authority Zero, Neon Trees, Paper Tongues, Circa Survive, Civil Twilight

2011: Incubus, Bush, Face to Face, Iration, Middle Class Rut, Viva Brother, Little Hurricane, Graffiti6

2012: Jane's Addiction, Garbage, Angels & Airwaves, P.O.D., Rebelution, Grouplove, Of Monsters and Men, Neon Trees, Eve 6, Walk the Moon

2013: Blink-182, Thirty Seconds to Mars, The Offspring, Jimmy Eat World, Silversun Pickups, Dirty Heads, Fitz and the Tantrums (cancelled the day of the show), Wavves, Atlas Genius, New Politics, I Am Dynamite

2014: 311, Foster the People, Panic! at the Disco, Iration, Phantogram, Capital Cities, MS MR, Bleachers, Sir Sly, Cherub, Skaters, KONGOS

2015: Modest Mouse, The Cult, Pennywise, Public Enemy, Cold War Kids, Death from Above 1979, Yelawolf, Atlas Genius, The Orwells, Robert DeLong, Meg Myers, Shady Francos

2016: Cheap Trick, The Offspring, Iration, KONGOS, Wolfmother, The Shelters, Chevy Metal, SWMRS, The Frights, Grace Mitchell, The Young Wild

2017: Phoenix, Empire of the Sun, Creature Canyon, Bob Moses, K.Flay, Missio, the Lemon Twigs, Sir Sly, Lo Moon, and Lightning Cola

== Pittsburgh, Pennsylvania ==
The event has, historically, been held at the Post-Gazette Pavilion in late May, hosted by WXDX-FM. However, a recent decline in the Pittsburgh concert market has forced the festival's format to change yearly.

=== Lineups ===
1998 (partial list): Green Day, Big Wreck, The Mighty Mighty Bosstones, Scott Weiland, The Clarks, Jimmie's Chicken Shack, Fuel, Deftones, God Lives Underwater, The Urge, Black Lab, Brownie Mary,(Stabbing Westward were forced to cancel on the day of the show)

1999: The Offspring, Orgy, Live, Lit, Fuel, The Mighty Mighty Bosstones, Sponge, Citizen King, The Flys, Staind, Videodrone, The Living End, Liars Inc., The Ike McCoy Band, Grapevine, The Distractions, The Buddy Brown Show

2000 (May 29) : (partial list) Stone Temple Pilots, Everclear, Eve 6, Stroke 9, Cypress Hill, Staind, The Flys, Crazy Town, Dynamite Hack, The Berlin Project, 8stops7, Stir, Grapevine, 7th House, The Distractions

2001 (May 18) : (partial list) Staind, Fuel, Our Lady Peace, The Clarks, Crazy Town, Dope, Train, The Buzz Poets, Disturbed, Saliva, Hed PE, New Invisible Joy, Dharma Sons, Juliana Theory

2002 (partial list): Tenacious D, Puddle of Mudd, Rob Zombie, Hoobastank, Reveille, Quarashi, Dashboard Confessional, Static-X, 3rd Strike, Custom, Trik Turner, Unwritten Law, The Clarks

2003 Staind, Evanescence, Godsmack, Punchline, Cold (cancelled the day of the show), The Donnas, The Juliana Theory, Seether, The Used, Breaking Benjamin, Eve 6, 12 Stones, Taproot, Trapt, Smile Empty Soul

2004 (May 28) : (partial list) The Offspring, Cypress Hill, New Found Glory, Drowning Pool, Switchfoot, Story of the Year, Punchline, Finger Eleven

The initial 2005 festival was to be held May 27 at the Chevrolet Amphitheater. This would be the first year that the festival was not held at the Post-Gazette Pavilion. However, the event, which featured Social Distortion, My Chemical Romance, Sum 41, Unwritten Law, and Thirty Seconds to Mars, was not given the X-Fest name. Sum 41 was scheduled to play this show, but was forced to cancel the day of due to sickness in the band. The festival occurred later in the year at the Post-Gazette Pavilion.

2005 (September 9): Disturbed, Our Lady Peace, Megan McCauley, Bloodhound Gang, Cold, Ill Niño, Thirty Seconds to Mars, 10 Years.

In 2006, the festival was changed to a concert series, with multiple (smaller) concerts throughout the summer.

2006 (May 27, Verizon Wireless Music Center): Staind, Three Days Grace, Blue October, People in Planes, Hurt

2006 (June 27, Chevrolet Amphitheater): Taking Back Sunday, Angels & Airwaves, Head Automatica, The Subways, and Punchline.

2006 (July 18, Chevrolet Amphitheater): Panic! at the Disco, The Dresden Dolls, The Hush Sound

2015 (July 25, Stage AE): Rise Against, Chevelle, Killswitch Engage, letlive., and Meg Myers

2015 (August 21, Stage AE): Social Distortion, Anti-Flag, Reel Big Fish, Nikki Lane, X Ambassadors, and Drag the River

2016 (July 3, Stage AE): Weezer, Panic! at the Disco, and Andrew McMahon in the Wilderness

== Huntington, West Virginia ==
Held at Huntington Civic Arena or Harris Riverfront Park by WAMX.

=== Lineups ===
1997: Days of the New, Jimmie's Chicken Shack

1998: The Nixons, Mighty Joe Plum

1999: Sponge, Machine Head, Orange 9mm, Soulmotor, DoubleDrive, Loudmouth

2000: Disturbed, The Union Underground, Days of the New, Bobaflex, Finger Eleven, Marvelous 3, SR-71, My Device, Supafuzz, The Heptanes

2001: Nickelback, Rollins Band, SOiL, Lifer

2002: SR-71, Clutch, Hatebreed, Flaw, 3rd Strike

2003: Type O Negative, Shinedown, Ra, SOiL, DoubleDrive, Lacuna Coil

2004: Sevendust, Monster Magnet, Earshot, Bobaflex, Soundevice, Red Carpet Bombers, Chum

2005: Seether, Crossfade, Dark New Day, Cold, Smile Empty Soul

2006: Black Stone Cherry, Evans Blue, Three Days Grace, Byzantine, Staind, Swamp Jeuce, Stone Buddha

2007: Hinder, Buckcherry, Papa Roach, Black Stone Cherry, Revelation Theory, Stereoside, Cinder Road

2008: Avenged Sevenfold, Shadows Fall, Midnight to Twelve XII, Egypt Central, Another Black Day, Pop Evil, Downtrend, PI

2009: Shinedown, Chevelle, Since October, Tantric, Adelitas Way, Bobaflex, Stitch Rivet, Split Nixon, Blue Sky Falling, Voices of Anatole, Let the Guilty Hang

2010: Seether, Sick Puppies, Cavo, Nonpoint, Stitch Rivet, Byzantine, Bud Carroll, Broken Shadows, Dirt Merchant

2011: Alter Bridge, Theory of a Deadman, Black Stone Cherry, Emphatic, Adelitas Way, (loud n local bands to be announced.)

== Cleveland, Ohio ==
Held at Tower City Amphitheater by WKRK-FM.

=== Lineups ===
2003: Staind, Cold, Trapt, Hed PE, Ra, Smile Empty Soul, Seether, Dirt, The Used were booked but canceled due to an illness

2004: Godsmack, Cypress Hill, New Found Glory, Fuel, Dropbox, Breaking Benjamin, My Chemical Romance

== Baton Rouge, Louisiana ==
Held at the Baton Rouge River Center. Hosted by 104.5/104.9 The X radio station.

=== Lineups ===
2007: The Howling Bells Saosin, The Red Jumpsuit Apparatus, Papa Roach, Jet, AFI, The Killers

2008: My Chemical Romance, Puddle of Mudd, Finger Eleven, Atreyu, Story of the Year, Billy Talent, Meriwether

== Fayetteville, Arkansas ==
Held at Randall Tyson Indoor Track Center by KXNA.

=== Lineups ===
2007: Saliva, Buckcherry, Puddle of Mudd, Three Days Grace

2008: 3 Doors Down, Chevelle, Hurt, Sick Puppies, Benjamin Del Shreve

Metal band 12 Stones was originally booked but dropped the show and was replaced by the Sick Puppies.

== Tucson, Arizona ==
Held at the Pima County Fairgrounds, sponsored by KLPX.

=== Lineups ===
2007: Rick Derringer, Starship, The Marshall Tucker Band, Loverboy, Kansas, The Doobie Brothers.

2009: Styx, REO Speedwagon, War, Eddie Money, Great White
