= Imagen Records =

American record label

Founded	April 2007
President	Bob Winegard
Vice President of A&R	Morgan Rose
Radio Promotion	Steven Nathan
Media Manager	Wade Spencer
Status	Independent
Distributor	ADA
Genre	Active Rock, alternative rock
Country of Origin	United States
Official Website	imagenrecords.com

Imagen Records is an American record label based in Washington D.C.

== History ==
Imagen Records is an independent record label featuring rock artists such as Framing Hanley, New Medicine, 3 Years Hollow, Candlelight Red, and Separations.. Founded in April 2007 by Bob Winegard, and based out of Washington, DC, Imagen Records has been able to establish an impressive roster of artists since its conception. Imagen Records’ Vice President and head of A&R, Morgan Rose, is the drummer for the heavy metal band Sevendust. The label welcomes established artists as well as up and coming artists, and promises a partnership between artist and label as opposed to detachment between the two. Imagen Records enjoys a strategic alliance with Alternative Distribution Alliance (ADA) who provides physical and digital global distribution of records as well as physical and merchandise production.

== Current and former artists ==
- ALBORN
- 3 Years Hollow
- Arnel Pineda
- Candlelight Red
- Framing Hanley
- Jela Cello
- Lloyd Dobler Effect
- Burden Of The Sky
- New Medicine
- Peaches and Herb
- Separations
- The Lonely Ones
- Bill Champlin
- ARTIFAS

== Discography ==
- Peaches and Herb - Colors of Love (May 8, 2009)
- Candlelight Red - The Wreckage (January 1, 2011)
- Candlelight Red - Demons EP (August 13, 2012)
- Candlelight Red - Reclamation (June 4, 2013)
- 3 Years Hollow - The Cracks (February 11, 2014)
- Framing Hanley - The Sum of Who We Are (April 29, 2014)
- New Medicine - Breaking the Model - (August 26, 2014)
- Separations - Dream Eater (October 2, 2015)
- Jela Cello - Christmas Dreams (November 6, 2015)
- Arnel Pineda - Sounds of Christmas (December 18, 2015)
- Namesake - Borders & Fences Deluxe Edition (January 15, 2016)
- Don't Believe in Ghosts - Solutions (May 14, 2021)

== See also ==
- List of record labels: I–Q
