= Edgefest (Little Rock) =

Music concert held in Little Rock, Arkansas

Edgefest is an annual concert held in Little Rock, Arkansas, United States. It is produced by 100.3 The Edge radio station.

== 2006 Edgefest I ==
July 7 North Shore Riverwalk - 7,500 in attendance

Rob Zombie, Anthrax, Shinedown, Trapt, Evans Blue, Halestorm

A look back at Edgefest

== 2007 Edgefest II ==
June 12 North Shore Riverwalk - 10,000 in attendance

Godsmack, Three Days Grace, Breaking Benjamin, Puddle of Mudd, Red, Sevendust, Skillet

== 2008 Edgefest III ==
April 26 East Shore Riverwalk - 15,000 in attendance

Kid Rock, Disturbed, Saliva, Sevendust, Five Finger Death Punch, Black Stone Cherry

== 2009 Edgefest IV (Mudfest) ==
May 9 Cooper Farm - 12,500 in attendance

Slipknot, Staind, Chevelle, Drowning Pool, All That Remains, Hurt, Dirtfedd

== 2009 Edgefest V: The Redemption ==
August 15, 2009 Arkansas State Fairgrounds - 9,000 in attendance. Tickets that were not used at the Edge-Mudfest were honored at this show.

Edgefest 5: The Redemption took place on August 15, 2009 because at the previous Edgefest, many ticket buyers could not get into the show because of rainy and muddy conditions. The Edge put together a second show in 2009 by bringing Mudvayne's Pedal to the Metal tour to Little Rock with the addition of headliners Korn on their Escape from the Studio tour.

Korn, Mudvayne, Black Label Society, Static-X, Suicide Silence, Bury Your Dead, Since October, Burn Halo, Wasting Days, Wishtribe, Dark from Day One, Bombay Black

Also featuring various surprise performances by the SideShow phenomenon HellzaPoppin.

== 2010 Edgefest VI ==
May 8, 2010 Arkansas State Fairgrounds - 19,000+ in attendance.

Godsmack, Rob Zombie featuring Joey Jordison, Seether, Papa Roach, Hellyeah, Five Finger Death Punch, Bullet for My Valentine, Drowning Pool, Lacuna Coil, The Veer Union, Shaman's Harvest, Dark from Day One, The Vail, The Coup de Grace

== 2011 Edgefest VII ==
April 23, 2011 Arkansas State Fairgrounds - 20,000+ in attendance.

Avenged Sevenfold, Stone Sour, Three Days Grace, Seether, Theory of a Deadman, Skillet, Sevendust, Helmet, Halestorm, My Darkest Days, Art of Dying, Dark from Day One

The seventh installment of Edgefest was held at the Arkansas State Fairgrounds, featuring dual main stages that allowed bands to perform in alternating sets.

== 2012 Edgefest VIII ==
August 18, 2012 Arkansas State Fairgrounds

Shinedown, Godsmack, Papa Roach, Staind, Adelitas Way, P.O.D, Deuce, Redlight King, In This Moment, Fozzy, Candlelight Red, Mindset Evolution

During the Edgefest VIII, STAIND frontman Aaron Lewis addressed the audience to express his displeasure after some attendees threw mud onto the stage during the band's performance. Lewis took a moment to voice his concerns about the behavior during the event.
