= WWE NXT =

Professional wrestling television program

- Logo used since 2024
- Also known as: NXT Redemption (2011–12); NXT 2.0 (2021–22); NXT on The CW (2024–present)
- Genre: Professional wrestling
- Created by: Vince McMahon; Paul Levesque
- Written by: Johnny Russo (Lead writer); See list of NXT creative writers
- Presented by: Vic Joseph (play-by-play commentator); Booker T (color commentator)
- Starring: NXT roster
- Announcer: Mike Rome
- Opening theme: "Wild and Young" by American Bang (seasons 1–2 & 4–5); "You Make the Rain Fall" by Kevin Rudolf (season 3); "Welcome Home" by Coheed and Cambria (2012–14); "Roar of the Crowd" by CFO$ (2014–17); "Resistance" by Powerflo (2017–19); "All Out Life" by Slipknot (2019–21); "Say Cheese" by Poppy (2021); "Down South" by Wale feat. Yella Beezy & Maxo Kream (2021–22); "Shredder" by def rebel (2022–24); "Millions From Now" by 2 Chainz & Lil Wayne (2024–26); "Shabang" by Drake (2026-present)
- Country of origin: United States
- No. of seasons: 18
- No. of episodes: 864

Production
- Executive producers: Paul Levesque; Lee Fitting; Shawn Michaels
- Production locations: Various arenas and sports venues (2010–2012; most episodes); Full Sail University (2012–2020; most episodes); WWE Performance Center (2020– present; most episodes)
- Camera setup: Multi-camera setup
- Running time: 120 minutes; 120–180 minutes (TakeOver specials)
- Production company: World Wrestling Entertainment, LLC

Original release
- Network: Syfy
- Release: February 23 – September 28, 2010
- Network: WWE.com
- Release: October 5, 2010 – June 13, 2012
- Network: Hulu
- Release: June 20, 2012 – February 19, 2014 (Note: Replays of new episodes continued to air on Hulu until 2024.)
- Network: WWE Network
- Release: February 27, 2014 – September 11, 2019 (Note: Replays of new episodes continued to air on Peacock's WWE Network channel in the United States until 2024.)
- Network: USA Network
- Release: September 18, 2019 – September 24, 2024
- Network: The CW; ESPN Unlimited (Note: from August 4, 2026)
- Release: October 1, 2024 – present

Related
- WWE Evolve; WWE Raw; WWE SmackDown; WWE Main Event

WWE NXT, also known as NXT on The CW or simply NXT, is an American professional wrestling television program. It is produced by the American professional wrestling promotion WWE, featuring wrestlers from the promotion's NXT brand division. The show currently airs live every Tuesday at 8 p.m. Eastern Time (ET) on The CW and ESPN Unlimited in the United States, and in most international markets on Netflix.

NXT initially debuted in 2010 on Syfy as a seasonal show which was presented as a hybrid between WWE's scripted live event shows and reality television, in which talent from WWE's then-developmental territory Florida Championship Wrestling (FCW) participated in a competition to become WWE's next "breakout star", with the help of mentors from WWE's Raw and SmackDown brands. Five seasons of this iteration were broadcast, with Wade Barrett, Kaval, Kaitlyn, and Johnny Curtis as winners. In June 2012, WWE ended the seasonal competition format and opted to revamp the show as a developmental wrestling program, replacing FCW. NXT became the flagship television show of the NXT brand, and has since received a positive reception and high viewership, with praise for its high quality of wrestling and captivating storylines, particularly from 2014 to 2018.

The initial version of the show made its debut on Syfy on February 23, 2010, replacing WWE ECW, but was replaced by SmackDown in October. It then aired as an hourly webcast on WWE.com in the United States until June 13, 2012, before it was expanded to international markets on the WWE Network in 2014. In 2019, NXT expanded into a live two-hour program on the USA Network, airing on Wednesday nights, at the same time as rival promotion All Elite Wrestling's flagship show Dynamite on TNT, before moving to Tuesday nights in April 2021. In September 2021, NXT was revamped and rebranded as NXT 2.0. A supplementary show titled NXT Level Up aired from February 18, 2022, until December 27, 2024, replacing 205 Live. In September 2022, "2.0" was dropped from the title, and on October 1, 2024, NXT moved to The CW.

The WWE Network ceased operations in the United States on April 5, 2021, with all content being moved to Peacock, which currently has most previous NXT episodes, excluding content that was censored or removed by Peacock TV's standards and practices department. Recent episodes are still available for on-demand viewing 30 days after the original air date.

Since its first episode in 2010, NXT has been taped in or broadcast from five different countries, primarily the United States but also in Canada, the United Kingdom, Mexico in 2011, Japan in 2017, and Australia in 2018.

== History ==
=== Background ===
On February 2, 2010, WWE Chairman Vince McMahon introduced a new weekly program that would replace the canceled ECW in its time slot on Syfy. McMahon described the show as "the next evolution of WWE; the next evolution of television history".

The new show's name, NXT, was later discovered to be trademarked already in the United Kingdom by National Wrestling Alliance (NWA) affiliate Scottish Wrestling Alliance (SWA) which also used "NXT" as their brand for upcoming stars. Both parties ultimately reached an agreement that resulted in SWA releasing the "NXT" trademark in favor of a new one before the show's debut.

The show's format was revealed in an article by Variety on February 16, with a press release from WWE made shortly later that day. NXT is the second reality-based series produced by WWE, the first being WWE Tough Enough which aired between 2001 and 2004. Due to WWE's nature of airing weekly shows without hiatus, the plan for NXT was to split the year's set of episodes into multiple seasons.

=== Original format (2010–2012) ===
NXT's first logo used from February 23, 2010 to June 13, 2012

NXT was formed in 2010 when they paired up wrestlers from WWE's developmental territory Florida Championship Wrestling (dubbed "Rookies") with wrestlers from WWE's existing Raw and SmackDown brands (dubbed "Pros"). Each episode featured the rookies being mentored by the pros as they develop their gimmick and performance skills in front of a live audience. The pairings also enabled the show to crossover into WWE's Raw and SmackDown programs. As the length of each season differed, features of the competition occur at different times accordingly. In addition to matches, weekly challenges were held during the competition to further test the Rookies' physical and mental skills.

Past physical challenges include a keg carrying contest, an assault course contest and a "Rock 'Em Sock 'Em" tournament. Past non-physical challenges include making 30-second promos on a given topic and selling programme within a time limit.

During the first two seasons, the winner of the weekly challenge receives a special prize such as a main event match, a talk show segment or a feature on WWE's official website. One of the more frequent prizes given out to the winner is an "Immunity Pass", which gives the holder immunity from elimination in the next round of polls. During the last three seasons a greater emphasis on challenges was placed on the show. Instead of awarding prizes to the winner of the challenges, points are instead awarded to the winner with a cumulative tally of points recorded before each of the first three polls. The Rookie with the most points before the next upcoming poll is awarded immunity. In season three, one point is awarded for winning the challenge.

In October 2010, WWE moved their show SmackDown to Syfy, with NXT leaving the network at the same time. Despite WWE's stated intention of broadcasting the show on another TV channel, NXT began to be aired as a webcast on WWE's website for American visitors.

In season four, the number of points vary on the difficulty of the challenge. In the result of a tie-break, the audience is then asked to vote for the Rookie they want to get immunity. Season four also saw the introduction of challenge matches involving the entire roster of Pros or Rookies where the winner would be given the chance to swap their respective Rookie or Pro for another. In various weeks, polls were held to evaluate the success of each Rookie and determine the winner of the competition. The poll rankings are entirely determined by votes from the Pros and starting from season 2, votes from fans via WWE's official website. In the Pros' votes, each of the Pros vote for their favorite Rookie, but cannot vote for their own Rookie. Their votes are based on the following four criteria:

- Win–loss record within the show
- Strength of opponents
- Work ethic
- "It" factor

Initially, in the first two seasons the full results and rankings from the poll were revealed. However, since August 17, 2010 only the elimination is revealed. The first poll, usually held a third of the way through the competition, determines the Rookies' rankings. Subsequent polls are held several weeks later near the end of the season, where the lowest ranked Rookie without immunity is eliminated. Season 2 was set to use this format, but was changed to have the first poll an elimination poll. Season three also used the second season's format. The show continued until the season finale, where the final two or three Rookies appear. One or two final polls were then held to determine the winner of the competition. The prize for the winner is a WWE contract as well as a championship match at any list of WWE pay-per-views. Outside of the polls, Rookies could still be eliminated via an executive decision from WWE management, as the first season saw both Daniel Bryan and Michael Tarver eliminated by management for a lack of self-confidence.

NXT Redemption logo used in 2012

Starting in 2012, the all-rookie competition was abandoned with the show now featuring past and present rookies alongside lower cardmembers of the main WWE roster. William Regal would also take over as the authority figure and match coordinator, with Matt Striker being retained as the show's host. On May 30, 2012, it was revealed that a sixth season of NXT under its original format was set to air. The season was supposed to star Big E, Seth Rollins, Damien Sandow, Hunico, Bo Dallas and Adam Rose as the season's rookies, but ultimately was cancelled before airing.

=== Reboot (2012–2019) ===
NXT's second logo used from June 20, 2012 to February 19, 2014

In May 2012, the show's format was revamped. The show began using more talent from FCW as well as talent from the main roster. The first four episodes under the new format were taped at Full Sail University on May 17.

WWE continued to air NXT Redemption, hoping a new television deal could be made. WWE.com revealed on June 13 that the new version of NXT would be made available online via WWE.com and YouTube beginning on Wednesday, June 20; when WWE would begin airing the episodes they taped at Full Sail on May 17. However, WWE removed all of the NXT material from their website on June 19. NXT was then aired exclusively on Hulu and Hulu Plus in the United States, while continuing to be broadcast internationally.

Beginning with NXT Arrival in February 2014, NXT has occasionally aired live specials on the WWE Network. These events would be aired under the NXT TakeOver banner from May 2014 to 2021, and effectively serve as the brand's equivalent to the main roster's pay-per-view shows. On March 13, 2014, NXT began airing episodes on the WWE Network.

On April 8, 2015, WWE aired a special NXT episode which was taped during the WrestleMania Axxess convention on March 26, 2015 at the San Jose McEnery Convention Center in San Jose, California. The episode also featured a tournament to decide the wrestler who would represent NXT in the André the Giant Memorial Battle Royal at WrestleMania 31.

NXT's third logo used from 2014 to 2017

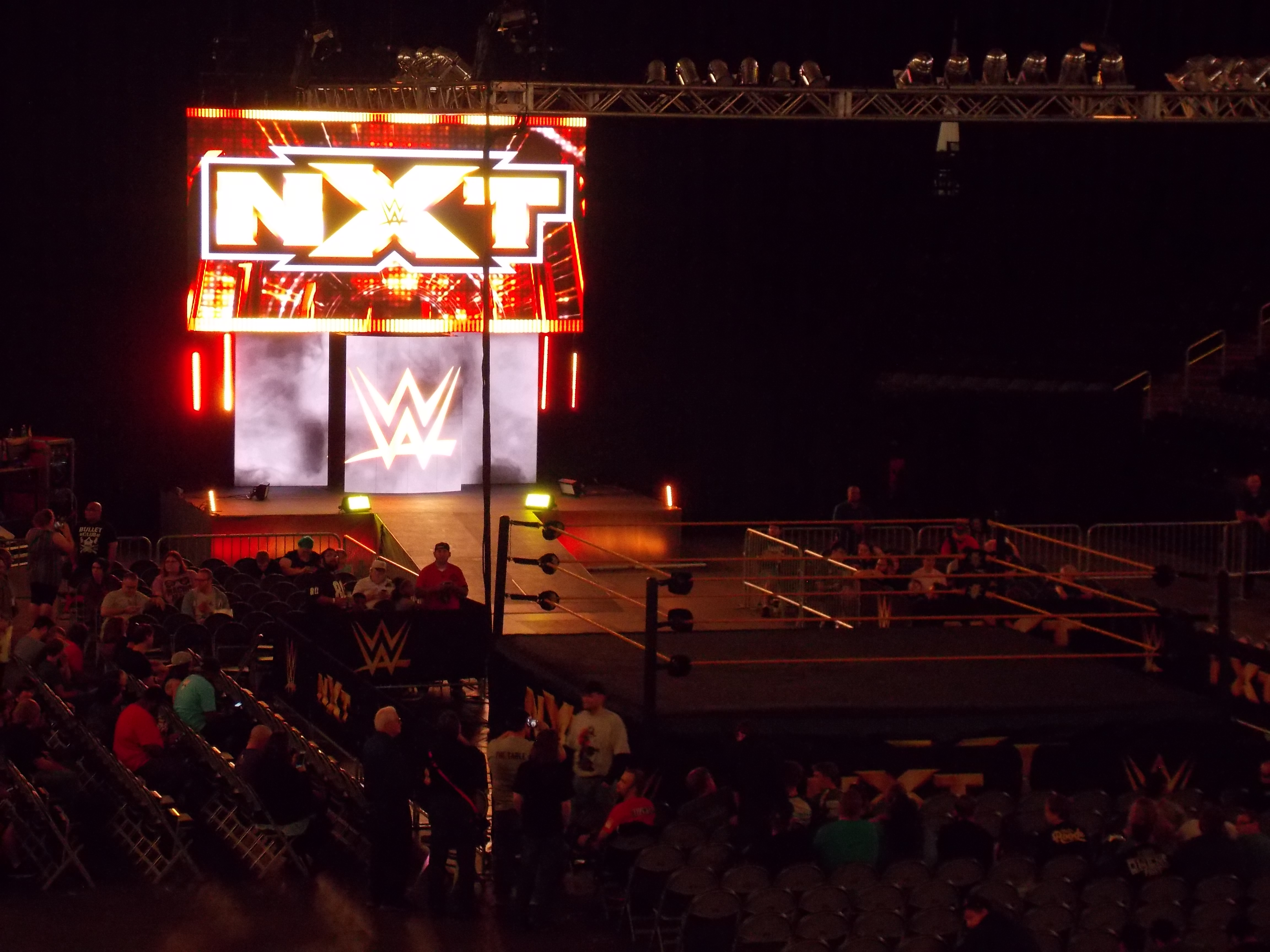
An NXT house show in Ralston, Nebraska in 2016.

NXT returned to cable on December 20, 2017, airing a 1-hour special on USA Network.

=== USA Network (2019–2024) ===
In September 18, 2019, NXT permanently moved to USA Network and was revamped as a live, two-hour program on Wednesday nights, with replays available the following day on WWE Network. Due to scheduling overlap with the final episodes of Suits, the second hour of the program was aired on WWE Network until October 2, when it began airing in its entirety on USA. This started the Wednesday Night Wars, during which NXT was broadcast in direct competition with rival wrestling show AEW Dynamite, which aired in the same time slot on TNT. Several publications noted the similarity between this ratings war and the Monday Night War that had involved Raw and WCW Monday Nitro.

Beginning with the March 18, 2020, episode of NXT, WWE began filming all of its programs without an audience at Full Sail University as a result of restrictions imposed amid the COVID-19 pandemic. On October 4, 2020, NXT relocated from Full Sail to the WWE Performance Center's main studio, citing logistical issues preventing it from continuing its residency at the university. The studio—which had been used by Raw and SmackDown from March to August due to COVID-19—was reconfigured as the "Capitol Wrestling Center", which featured a virtual audience on a video wall, and a limited in-person audience shielded behind plexiglass barriers. COVID-19 measures in the studio began to be lifted in April 2021, and removed entirely in June.

With the end of Wednesday Night Wars, on April 13, 2021, following WrestleMania 37, WWE moved NXT back to Tuesday nights. After twelve NXT wrestlers were released from their contracts that August, Dave Scherer and Mike Johnson of Pro Wrestling Insider reported there had been internal talks of major changes to the brand, such as: "a new logo, new lighting, a focus on younger talents and a different format to the TV shows." Dave Meltzer reported that, after having lost the ratings war with AEW, NXT will likely go back to their developmental roots, with "talent that are younger, bigger and that could someday main event at WrestleMania." WWE President Nick Khan subsequently confirmed that NXT would undergo a "complete revamp" overseen by Triple H. However, due to undergoing heart surgery in September, Levesque stepped away from NXT with Shawn Michaels stepping in to oversee the changes.

On the September 14, 2021 episode of NXT, the program was relaunched as NXT 2.0 to mark the changes, introducing a new rainbow-colored logo and redesigned studio. In September 2022, Michaels' role was made permanent, with his job title confirmed as Senior Vice President of Talent Development Creative, responsible for both creative and development at NXT. At the conclusion of the September 13, 2022 episode of NXT (which marked the one-year anniversary of the relaunch), an updated NXT logo was unveiled, removing the "2.0" branding and returning to a gold color scheme.

NXT's seventh logo used from September 13, 2022 to September 24, 2024

=== Move to The CW (2024–present) ===
On November 7, 2023, WWE announced that NXT would move to The CW in October 2024 under a five-year deal. The network had previously broadcast SmackDown (as a carry-over from its co-predecessor, UPN), as well as the short-lived Saturday Morning Slam (as part of the Saban Brands-produced Saturday morning block Vortexx).

NXT premiered on The CW October 1, 2024; as part of the launch, the program scheduled two weeks of travel shows while the Performance Center studio was redesigned, with the season premiere from Allstate Arena in Rosemont, followed by Enterprise Center in St. Louis the following week. However, the St. Louis show was later moved to a smaller venue—The Factory at The District—in the suburb of Chesterfield, Missouri due to low ticket sales.

On October 21, 2024, WWE announced that it would broadcast NXT 2300 from 2300 Arena in Philadelphia (the former home arena of ECW) on November 6, a special Wednesday night broadcast due to The CW simulcasting corporate sibling NewsNation's coverage of the 2024 United States presidential election the previous day.

On April 28, 2026, WWE announced that the NXT brand's live events would air as television specials on The CW under a multi-year deal covering around 20 events, beginning with The Great American Bash; the rights to NXT live events were previously held by Peacock until March 2026, when they moved to YouTube on an interim basis. The next day, The CW also announced an agreement with ESPN to sublicense streaming rights to all CW Sports and WWE programming carried by the network to the ESPN app for Unlimited subscribers, accompanying its rights to main roster live events.

== Roster ==
The wrestlers featured on WWE take part in scripted feuds and storylines. Wrestlers are portrayed as heroes, villains, or less distinguishable characters in scripted events that build tension and culminate in a wrestling match.

The primary commentators for NXT are Vic Joseph and Booker T. Additional commentary has been provided by Michael Cole, Jim Ross, Tony Dawson, Tom Phillips, Rich Brennan, Mauro Ranallo, Corey Graves and others since its creation.

== Production ==
In its original incarnation, the American Bang song "Wild and Young" had been used for each season with the exception of the third. During season three, the show's opening theme song was "You Make the Rain Fall" by Kevin Rudolf. "Get Thru This" by Art of Dying was also used as bumper music during the initial five seasons of the show. NXT, as a game show, were held in large arenas as a part of the taping schedules of WWE's other shows which featured the ring ropes yellow and used the same HD set used by WWE's other weekly programs.

Upon its reboot and arrival at Full Sail University, "Welcome Home" by Coheed and Cambria was used from the show's relaunch on June 20, 2012, to February 24, 2014, but it retains the yellow ropes and used the black mat. "Roar of the Crowd" by CFO$ served as the official theme song for NXT since its arrival to the WWE Network from (February 27, 2014) to April 5, 2017. A remix of the same song was used starting on June 15, 2016. From April 12, 2017, the theme song was "Rage" by CFO$, followed by "Resistance" by Powerflo; which was first used on the May 31, 2017 episode.

On the April 4, 2019 episode, "All Out Life" by Slipknot was used as the new theme song.

From April 13, 2021, to September 7, 2021, the official theme song for NXT was "Say Cheese" by Poppy, first performed at NXT TakeOver: Stand & Deliver.

When NXT was relaunched as NXT 2.0 on September 14, 2021, the official theme song was "Down South" by Wale featuring Yella Beezy & Maxo Kream. The new set features multicolored LED screens with an arch. The ring mat turned white and the ring ropes became white before turning blue and the announce table was repositioned. After NXT 2.0 was reverted to NXT, the ring ropes were reverted to white and the logo became white with black and gold accents in October 2022.

From October 1, 2024, episode, the new official theme song is "Millions From Now" by 2 Chainz & Lil Wayne and the ring mat would now be middle grey.

== Broadcast history ==
Channel	Timeslot	Years
Syfy	Tuesday 10–11 p.m. ET	February 23, 2010 – September 28, 2010
Syfy	Tuesday 8–10 p.m. ET	February 8, 2022 – February 15, 2022
USA	Wednesday 8–10 p.m. ET	September 18, 2019 – April 7, 2021
USA	Tuesday 8–10 p.m. ET	April 13, 2021 – September 24, 2024
The CW	Tuesday 8-10 p.m ET	October 1, 2024 – present

=== International broadcasts ===
==== Canada ====
NXT currently broadcasts live in Canada on Netflix, alongside Raw and SmackDown. Initially, the show aired on Global Television Network taking the old slot of ECW. In July 2010, the series moved to The Score (renamed to Sportsnet 360 in 2013).

In February 2021, NXT began to broadcast live on Wednesday aligning with USA Network schedule. This continued when NXT returned to Tuesday nights in April 2021.

All archived broadcasts of NXT were available on the WWE Network until its closure in December 2024. Since January 1, 2025, WWE's Canadian broadcast rights are held by Netflix. Select archived episodes are available for streaming on Netflix under the title NXT Vault, with live broadcasts beginning on January 7.

Although Netflix is the current rights holder in Canada, NXT is still available on linear television, as The CW is widely carried by Canadian television providers.

==== Elsewhere ====
WWE NXT is currently broadcast in the United Kingdom on Netflix alongside Raw and Smackdown.

In South Africa, WWE NXT airs live on SuperSport on Wednesdays.

In the Arab world, NXT airs live on Netflix on Wednesday mornings.

In New Zealand, a one-hour version of NXT is broadcast on Sky 5 and Sky Open.

In Germany, ProSieben Maxx started broadcasting NXT episodes on Thursdays after WrestleMania 39. They also air Raw on Wednesdays and SmackDown on Saturdays.

== See also ==
- WWE Performance Center, WWE's training facility, which is close to Full Sail University.
- List of professional wrestling television series
