= Throwdown =

Throwdown or Throw Down may refer to:

== Arts, entertainment, and media ==
=== Games ===
- Animation Throwdown: The Quest For Cards, a mobile crossover card battle game released by Kongregate in 2016, involving characters, settings and episodes from five popular animated sitcoms
- UFC: Throwdown, a 2002 videogame

=== Music ===
- Throw Down (album), a 2013 country album by Tim Hicks
- Throwdown (band), an American groove metal/metalcore band
- Throwdown, a 2014 EP by Fox Stevenson
- "Hoedown Throwdown", a 2009 song performed by American recording artist Miley Cyrus, combining elements of country, dance, pop and rap
- "Small Town Throwdown", a 2014 song by Brantley Gilbert
- The Big Throwdown, a 1987 album by LeVent
- The Throwdowns, an American reggae band
- Throwin' Down, an album Rick James, featuring the song "Throwdown"

=== Television ===
- "Throwdown" (Glee), a 2009 episode of the Fox television series Glee
- Throwdown Thursday, a basketball TV show
- Throwdown! with Bobby Flay, a competition show on Food Network
- The Great Pottery Throw Down, a ceramics competition show on BBC Channel 4

=== Other uses in arts, entertainment, and media ===
- Throw Down (film), a 2004 Hong Kong action film
- Throwdowns, bang snaps fireworks

== Other uses ==
- Throw down, to fist fight or brawl
- Throwdown, a gun planted as a result of police corruption
- Throwdown in Motown, a 2004 NBA brawl with the Indiana Pacers and the Detroit Pistons
