= Edgefest (disambiguation) =

Edgefest was an annual outdoor rock festival in Canada from 1985 to 2015.

Edgefest also refers to:

- Edgefest (Little Rock), a music festival in Little Rock, Arkansas
- Edgefest (New Zealand concert tour)
- Edgefest (Dallas), an annual music festival hosted by KDGE in the Dallas, Texas, area from 1992 to 2017
