= Alternative Distribution Alliance =

Music distribution company

ADA Worldwide
- Type: Subsidiary
- Industry: Music and entertainment
- Genre: Various
- Founded: 1993; 33 years ago
- Headquarters: New York City, United States
- Area served: Worldwide
- Number of employees: 75+
- Parent: Warner Music Group
- Website: Official website

Alternative Distribution Alliance (ADA) is a music distribution company owned by Warner Music Group, which represents the rights to various independent record labels. ADA provides "independent artist and label partners with access to the resources, relationships and experience required to share their creative vision with a global audience".

== History ==
As the independent music distribution arm of Warner Music Group, ADA Worldwide was created in 1993 as a joint-venture between WMG and Restless Records to offer a distribution system and marketing, merchandising, promotion, and music licensing services.

In January 2008, ADA acquired Insound, an online music retailer.

In 2012, Warner Music Group merged the Independent Label Group with ADA, creating a full-service company. The new ADA offered global distribution—both physical and digital—along with physical production, merchandise services, account management, and in-house music licensing. Additional offerings included custom products, marketing and sponsorship support, and digital marketing tools.

In March 2017, ADA announced that it would distribute the catalogs of most of the labels owned by BMG Rights Management worldwide.

In January 2020, Beggars Group, Domino Recording Co., and Saddle Creek left ADA and switched to Redeye Distribution, and later in November, Entertainment One followed suit and had AMPED distribute most of eOne's labels. In October 2023, BMG moved its physical distribution to Universal Music Group, and started distributing their own catalog on digital platforms.

== Independent labels ==
- 3CG Records
- FUSE FOUR
- Alligator Records
- Three Six Zero Recordings
- Acony Records
- Adrenaline Music
- Africori Music Group
- AKM Music
- Alma Records
- Altitude Records
- Anzic Records
- Arhoolie Records
- Avitone Records
- Bad Apple
- Bad Timing Records
- Bar/None Records
- Barrowman/Barker Productions (UK)
- Beauty Marks Entertainment
- Beechwood Park Records
- Bieler Bros. Records
- Blackground Records
- Blind Man Sound
- Bloodshot Records
- Blix Street Records
- Blisslife Records
- Blistering Records
- Blue Corn Music
- Blue Horizon
- BMG Rights Management (some releases)
- Bolero Records
- Boomy
- Born & Bred Records
- Bridge 9 Records
- Brash Records
- Brassland
- Breakbeat Science Records
- Bright Antenna
- Broken Bow Records
- Bronze Records
- Canyon Records
- Carpark Records
- Castle Music
- Cavity Search Records
- Cherry Red Records
- Cherrytree Records
- Chesky Records
- Chime Entertainment
- Cage Riot
- Chrysalis Records (certain artists' reissues only; since 2017)
- CMC International
- Comedy Central Records
- Compass Records
- Courgette Records
- Crunchy Frog Records
- Curb Records
- Cursus Audio, a division of Cursus Holdings Ltd.
- Daft Life
- David Lynch Music Company
- DaySpring Records
- Deko Entertainment
- Dogtree Records
- Dcide Records
- Decaydance Records
- Dim Mak Records
- DimeRock Records
- Discotek Media
- Dualtone Records
- Echo Records
- el Music Group
- Enigma Records (only select titles absorbed into Restless Records)
- Everfine Records
- Eyeball Records
- Ferret Music
- Funzalo Records
- Gauche Records
- Girlhood Records
- Good Fight
- Greensleeves Records
- GWR Records
- Half Note Records
- Herb Alpert Presents
- High Note Records
- Hellcat Records
- Hot Girl Productions
- Heavy Muscle, LLC
- I and Ear Records
- Imagen Records
- INB100
- Inside Recordings
- InVogue Records
- I Scream Records
- JEMP Records
- Kesha Records
- LAB Records
- Lakeshore Records (physical)
- Lex Records
- London Recordings
- Macklemore LLC
- Made by Mutant
- Marshall Records
- Masquerade Recordings
- Mayhem Records
- Manifesto Records
- Miniature Ponies
- Misfits Records
- Metropolis Records
- Minty Fresh Records
- Mute Records
- Myrrh Records
- Napalm Records
- Nervous Records
- Nettwerk
- New High Recordings
- New Noize Records
- Nitro Records
- Nixa Records
- Nuclear Blast
- Nudgie Records
- Onyxx Records
- Omnivore Recordings
- Partisan Records
- Paix Per Mil (South Korea)
- Producer Entertainment Group
- Play Tyme Records
- PRT Records
- Pure Noise Records
- Polyvinyl Record Company
- Popsicle Records
- Projekt Records
- Psychopathic Records
- Punahele Records
- Pye Records
- Real World Records
- Restless Records
- Rhymesayers Entertainment
- Rise Records
- Rock Ridge Music
- Rostrum Records
- RT Industries
- Run For Cover Records
- Sanctuary Records
- Select Records
- SharpTone Records
- StandBy Records
- SideOneDummy Records
- Silver Lining Music
- Skeleton Crew
- SLANG
- Slugfest Records
- Small Stone Records
- Sepulchral Silence
- Stony Plain Records
- Strictly Rhythm Records
- Sub Pop Records
- Tender Loving Empire
- Tommy Boy Entertainment
- Thirsty Ear Recordings
- TML Entertainment
- Troubleman Unlimited
- The Control Group
- The Throwdowns
- Thrill Jockey Records
- Tomorrow Records
- Tortur3 Entertainment
- Touch & Go Records
- Twenty Two Recordings
- Ubiquity Records
- Unidisc Music
- VP Records
- We Put Out Records
- Williams Street Records
- WaterTower Music (excluding Japan)
- Word Records
- Warcon Enterprises
- Wide Sun, a division of FUSE FOUR LLC
- You Entertainment
