= Rise Up (Art of Dying album) =

Studio album by Art of Dying
- Released: 11 December 2015
- Recorded: 2014–15
- Genre: Alternative metal; post-grunge; hard rock
- Length: 44:35
- Label: Better Noise; Eleven Seven
- Producer: David Bendeth

Art of Dying chronology
Vices and Virtues (2011)	Rise Up (2015)	Armageddon (2019)

Singles from Rise Up
- 1. "Rise Up (featuring Dan Donegan)" Released: March 2, 2015; 2. "Tear Down the Wall" Released: March 2015; 3. "Everything" Released: September 24, 2015; 4. "Moth to a Flame" Released: April 6, 2016

'Rise Up' is the third studio album by Canadian rock band Art of Dying. It was released on December 11, 2015, digitally from Better Noise Music and Eleven Seven Music.

The album was rated an eight out of ten by Antihero Magazine.

== Track listing ==
1. "Best Won't Do" – 3:07
2. "Rise Up" (featuring Dan Donegan) – 3:43
3. "Tear Down the Wall" – 3:04
4. "Eat You Alive" – 3:26
5. "Dead Man Walking" – 3:24
6. "Some Things Never Change" – 3:21
7. "Everything" – 3:54
8. "Space" – 3:22
9. "Raging" – 2:51
10. "Just for Me" – 3:29
11. "One Day at a Time" – 3:39
12. "Moth to a Flame" – 3:16
13. "Ubuntu" – 3:59

== Personnel ==
- Jonny Hetherington – lead vocals
- Jeff Brown – drums
- Cale Gontier – bass
- Tavis Stanley – guitar

Additional musicians

- Dan Donegan – additional guitars on "Rise Up"
