= Uproar Festival =

Annual concert tour (2010–2014)

- Genre: Hard rock, post-grunge, heavy metal, alternative metal, metalcore, nu metal, groove metal, thrash metal
- Dates: August–October
- Locations: United States, Canada
- Years active: 2010–2014
- Founders: John Reese
- Website: www.rockstaruproar.com

The Uproar Festival, also called the Rockstar Energy Drink Uproar Festival, was an annual hard rock and heavy metal tour inaugurated in 2010 by John Reese and sponsored by Rockstar Energy Drink. The tour was also created by John Oakes, Darryl Eaton and Ryan Harlacher from the Creative Artists Agency, and Perry Lavoisne from Live Nation. Reese is also responsible for creating Mayhem Festival and the Taste of Chaos tour. Uproar Festival is the replacement for Reese's Taste of Chaos tour, as he was "running out of bands that fit within the profile of what Taste of Chaos was."

Reese attempted to have Pantera as headliner for a 2015 show, but those plans fell through. The 2014 festival was the last.

== 2010 line-up ==
Main Stage

- Disturbed
- Avenged Sevenfold
- Stone Sour
- Halestorm

Jägermeister Stage

- Hellyeah
- Airbourne
- Hail the Villain
- New Medicine
- White Cowbell Oklahoma (for all Canadian dates)
- Jägermeister Battle of the Bands Winner

=== 2010 tour dates ===
Date	City	Country	Venue	Battle of the Bands winner
August 17, 2010	Minneapolis	United States	Target Center	Calous
August 18, 2010	Bonner Springs	United States	Sandstone Amphitheater	Seasons After
August 20, 2010	Council Bluffs	United States	WestFair Amphitheater	
August 21, 2010	Tinley Park	United States	First Midwest Bank Amphitheatre	Ground Effect
August 22, 2010	Corfu	United States	Darien Lake Performing Arts Center	As Summer Dies
August 24, 2010	Columbus	United States	Nationwide Arena	XFactor1
August 25, 2010	Toronto	Canada	Molson Amphitheatre	
August 27, 2010	Scranton	United States	Toyota Pavilion at Montage Mountain	Candlelight Red
August 28, 2010	Saratoga Springs	United States	Saratoga Performing Arts Center	Mutiny Within
August 29, 2010	Holmdel	United States	PNC Bank Arts Center	Stereo Fallout
August 31, 2010	Bristow	United States	Jiffy Lube Live	Fight the Lion
September 1, 2010	Charlotte	United States	Verizon Wireless Amphitheatre	Straight Line Stitch
September 3, 2010	Pelham	United States	Verizon Wireless Music Center	Year and a Day
September 4, 2010	Atlanta	United States	Aaron's Amphitheatre at Lakewood	Uncrowned
September 5, 2010	Tampa	United States	Ford Amphitheatre	Element 55
September 8, 2010	Tulsa	United States	BOK Center	Seasons After
September 10, 2010	Dallas	United States	SuperPages.com Center	Squint
September 11, 2010	Corpus Christi	United States	Concrete Street Amphiteater	Snake Skin Prison
September 12, 2010	The Woodlands	United States	Cynthia Woods Mitchell Pavilion	Ember
September 14, 2010	Greenwood Village	United States	Comfort Dental Amphitheatre	The Sammus Theory
September 15, 2010	West Valley City	United States	USANA Amphitheatre	Riksha
September 17, 2010	Irvine	United States	Verizon Wireless Amphitheatre	Eyes Set to Kill
September 18, 2010	Chula Vista	United States	Cricket Wireless Amphitheatre	Mower
September 19, 2010	Tempe	United States	Tempe Beach Park Amphitheatre	Eyes Set to Kill
September 21, 2010	Bakersfield	United States	Rabobank Arena	Conspiracy Theory
September 22, 2010	Wheatland	United States	Sleep Train Amphitheatre	The Chimpz
September 24, 2010	Post Falls	United States	Greyhound Park	Denots
September 25, 2010	Auburn	United States	White River Amphitheatre	Gwamba
September 26, 2010	Vancouver	Canada	Pacific Coliseum	Carpenter
September 28, 2010	Edmonton	Canada	Rexall Place	
September 29, 2010	Calgary	Canada	Scotiabank Saddledome	
September 30, 2010	Saskatoon	Canada	Credit Union Centre	
October 2, 2010	Winnipeg	Canada	MTS Centre	Saigon Hookers
October 3, 2010	Fargo	United States	Fargodome	3 Pill Morning
October 4, 2010	Madison	United States	Alliant Energy Center Memorial Coliseum	3 Pill Morning

== 2011 line-up ==
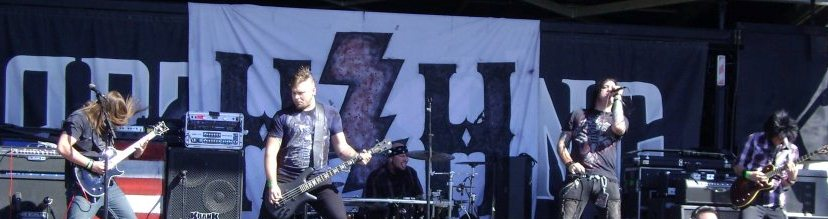
Sam Hughes of Buried as Thieves performing with Phoenix alternative rock band The Sammus Theory at Uproar Festival in Arizona in 2011

Main Stage

- Avenged Sevenfold
- Three Days Grace
- Seether
- Bullet for My Valentine
- Escape the Fate

Best Buy Music Gear Stage

- Sevendust
- Black Tide
- Art of Dying
- Hell or Highwater
- Fozzy (Selected Dates)
- Battle of the Bands Winner

=== 2011 tour dates ===
Date	City	Country	Venue	Battle of the Bands winner
August 26, 2011	Camden	United States	Susquehanna Bank Center	Wildstreet
August 27, 2011	Scranton	United States	Toyota Pavilion	Through The Flood
August 30, 2011	Mansfield	United States	Comcast Center	Thurkills Vision
August 31, 2011	Bristow	United States	Jiffy Lube Live	Sky Came Burning
September 1, 2011	Virginia Beach	United States	Farm Bureau Live at Virginia Beach	Fire Fire
September 3, 2011	Tampa	United States	1-800-ASK-GARY Amphitheatre	Nu Era
September 4, 2011	Biloxi	United States	Mississippi Coast Coliseum	Cathercist
September 5, 2011	The Woodlands	United States	Cynthia Woods Mitchell Pavilion	No Such Thing
September 9, 2011	Clarkston	United States	DTE Energy Music Theatre	Bloodline Riot
September 10, 2011	Corfu	United States	Darien Lake Performing Arts Center	Cry To The Blind
September 11, 2011	Hartford	United States	The Comcast Theatre	Victims of Tragedy
September 13, 2011	Montreal	Canada	Parc Jean-Drapeau	
September 14, 2011	Toronto	Canada	Molson Canadian Amphitheatre	
September 16, 2011	Burgettstown	United States	First Niagara Pavilion	Through These Walls
September 17, 2011	Noblesville	United States	Verizon Wireless Music Center	Luminoth
September 18, 2011	Tinley Park	United States	First Midwest Bank Amphitheatre	Mindset Evolution
September 20, 2011	Grand Rapids	United States	Van Andel Arena	
September 21, 2011	Cuyahoga Falls	United States	Blossom Music Center	Blackout Superstar
September 23, 2011	Omaha	United States	WestFair Amphitheater	The Wreckage
September 24, 2011	Bonner Springs	United States	Sandstone Amphitheater	Echo Vendetta
September 25, 2011	Maryland Heights	United States	Verizon Wireless Amphitheatre	Seldon
September 28, 2011	Calgary	Canada	Saddledome	
September 29, 2011	Edmonton	Canada	Rexall Place	
October 1, 2011	Auburn	United States	White River Amphitheatre	In Her Memory
October 2, 2011	Spokane	United States	Spokane Arena	The Fail Safe Project
October 4, 2011	West Valley City	United States	USANA Amphitheatre	
October 5, 2011	Greenwood Village	United States	Comfort Dental Amphitheatre	I Capture Castle
October 7, 2011	Albuquerque	United States	Hard Rock Pavilion	Signal 99
October 8, 2011	Phoenix	United States	Ashley Furniture HomeStore Pavilion	The Sammus Theory
October 9, 2011	Chula Vista	United States	Cricket Wireless Amphitheatre	Jahmbi
October 13, 2011	Wheatland	United States	Sleep Train Amphitheatre	Stepchild
October 14, 2011	Mountain View	United States	Shoreline Amphitheatre	Kill the Messenger

== 2012 line-up ==
Main Stage

- Shinedown
- Godsmack
- Staind
- Papa Roach (cancelled after first five dates due to Jacoby Shaddix vocal chords problems, Rock the Rapids show was also cancelled)
- Adelitas Way

Ernie Ball Stage

- P.O.D. (except 8/25, replaced Papa Roach on the main stage on the Rock the Rapids show)
- Fozzy (except 8/19, 8/29 and 9/18)
- Mindset Evolution
- Candlelight Red

Jägermeister Stage

- Deuce
- Redlight King (except 9/1 and 9/18)
- In This Moment (until 9/2)
- Thousand Foot Krutch (started 9/7, except 9/8, 9/15. 9/29 and 9/30)
- Greek Fire (select dates only: 8/17, 8/18, 8/19, 8/22, 8/24)
- Switchpin (select dates only: 8/17, 8/18, 8/19, 8/22, 8/24, 8/25, 8/26, 8/28)
- Cruz (select dates only: 8/19, 8/25, 8/26, 8/28, 8/31, 9/1, 9/2, 9/7)
- Silvertung (select dates only: 8/31, 9/1, 9/2)
- Uncrowned (select dates only: 9/7, 9/8, 9/9, 9/11, 9/12, 9/13, 9/16, 9/19, 9/29, 9/30)
- Within Reason (select dates only: 9/8, 9/9, 9/11, 9/12, 9/13, 9/16)
- Attika 7 (select dates only: 9/19, 9/21, 9/22, 9/23, 9/25, 9/29, 9/30)
- Drown Mary (select dates only: 9/21, 9/22, 9/23)

=== 2012 tour dates ===
Date	City	Country	Venue	Battle of the Bands winner
August 17, 2012	Bonner Springs	United States	Cricket Wireless Amphitheater	The Wreckage
August 18, 2012	Little Rock	United States	Arkansas State Fairgrounds (KDJE Radio Show)	
August 19, 2012	Maryland Heights	United States	Verizon Wireless Amphitheater	
August 21, 2012	Grand Rapids	United States	Rock the Rapids (main stage bands only)	
August 22, 2012	Tinley Park	United States	First Midwest Bank Amphitheatre	3 Years Hollow
August 24, 2012	Holmdel	United States	PNC Bank Arts Center	
August 25, 2012	Syracuse	United States	New York State Fair Grandstand	
August 26, 2012	Mansfield	United States	Comcast Center	
August 28, 2012	Scranton	United States	Toyota Pavilion at Montage Mountain	True Becoming
August 29, 2012	Corfu	United States	Darien Lake Performing Arts Center	
August 31, 2012	Burgettstown	United States	First Niagara Pavilion	
September 1, 2012	Saratoga Springs	United States	Saratoga Performing Arts Center	
September 2, 2012	Bristow	United States	Jiffy Lube Live	The Chuck Shaffer Picture Show
September 5, 2012	Simpsonville	United States	Charter Amphitheatre at Heritage Park	
September 7, 2012	Clarkston	United States	DTE Energy Music Theatre	
September 8, 2012	Noblesville	United States	Klipsch Music Center	7 Days Away
September 9, 2012	Cuyahoga Falls	United States	Blossom Music Center	
September 11, 2012	Raleigh	United States	Time Warner Cable Music Pavilion at Walnut Creek	
September 12, 2012	Atlanta	United States	Aaron's Amphitheatre at Lakewood	
September 13, 2012	Tampa	United States	1-800-ASK-GARY Amphitheatre	
September 15, 2012	The Woodlands	United States	The Woodlands Pavilion	
September 16, 2012	Dallas	United States	Gexa Energy Pavilion	Bow Prometheus
September 18, 2012	Greenwood Village	United States	Comfort Dental Amphitheatre	
September 19, 2012	West Valley City	United States	USANA Amphitheatre	
September 21, 2012	Post Falls	United States	Greyhound Park and Events Center	
September 22, 2012	Auburn	United States	White River Amphitheatre	
September 23, 2012	Ridgefield	United States	Sleep Country Amphitheater	In Her Memory
September 25, 2012	Nampa	United States	Idaho Center	
September 29, 2012	Phoenix	United States	Ashley Furniture HomeStore Pavilion	A Story Beneath
September 30, 2012	Albuquerque	United States	The Pavilion	

== 2013 line-up ==
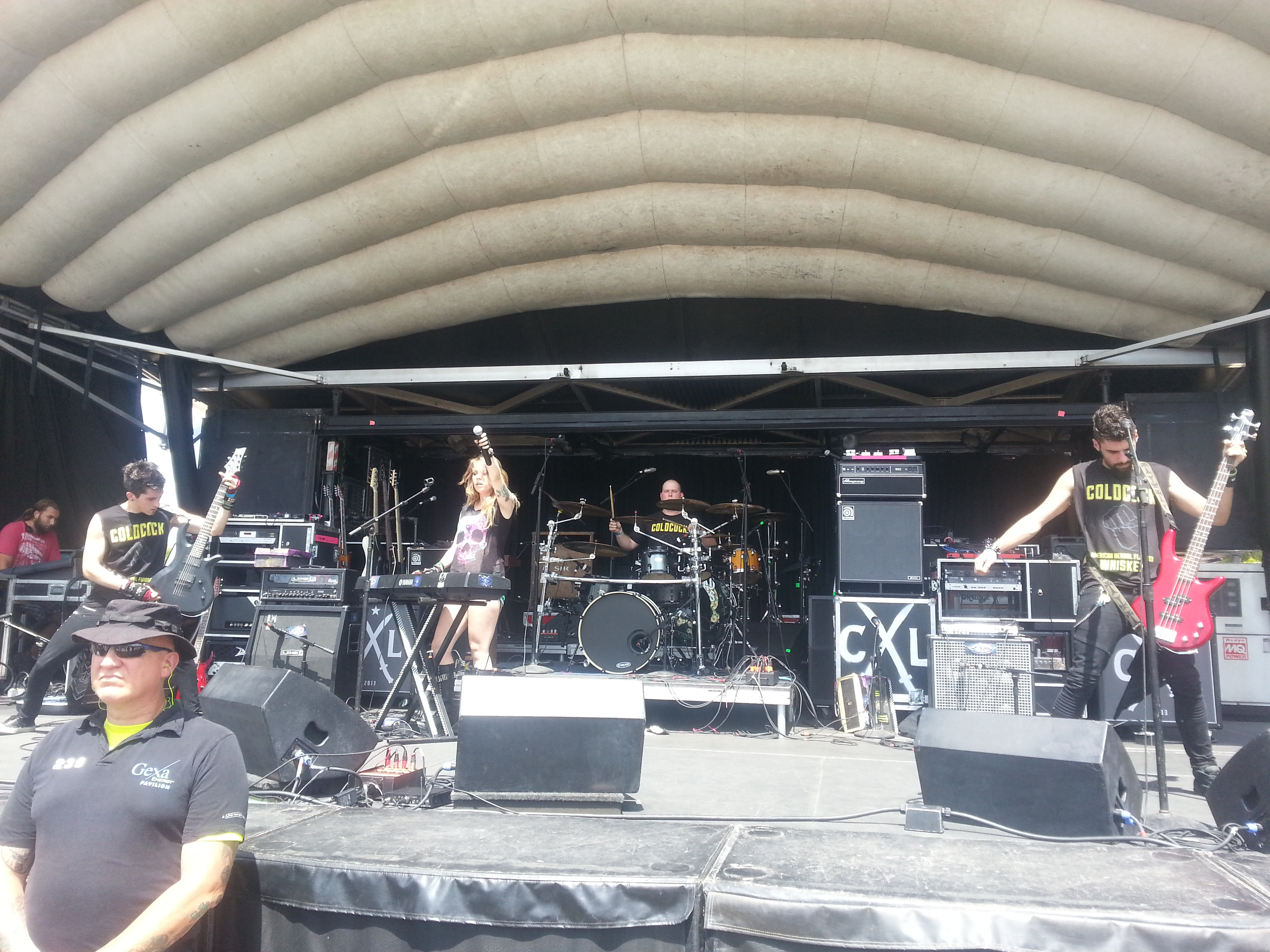
Arlington alternative rock band Solice performing at Uproar Festival in Dallas

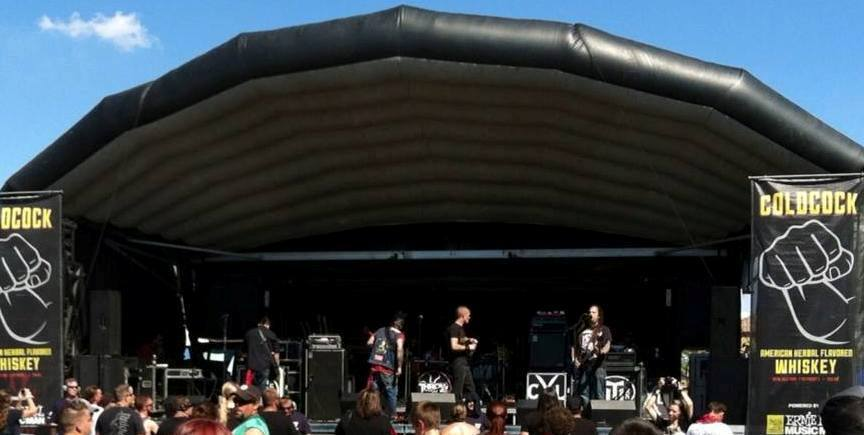
Phoenix groove rock band Throw Logic performing at Uproar Festival in Arizona

Main Stage

- Alice in Chains
- Jane's Addiction
- Coheed and Cambria
- Circa Survive

Festival Stage

- Walking Papers
- Danko Jones
- Middle Class Rut
- New Politics
- The Chuck Shaffer Picture Show

COLDCOCK Spirits Showcase Stage

- The Dead Daisies
- Beware of Darkness
- Charming Liars

=== 2013 tour dates ===
Date	City	Country	Venue	Battle of the Bands winner
August 9, 2013	Scranton	United States	Toyota Pavilion	
August 10, 2013	Hartford	United States	The Comcast Theatre	
August 11, 2013	Darien	United States	Darien Lake Performing Arts Center	
August 13, 2013	Saratoga Springs	United States	Saratoga Performing Arts Center	
August 14, 2013	Mansfield	United States	Comcast Center	
August 16, 2013	Bristow	United States	Jiffy Lube Live	
August 17, 2013	Holmdel	United States	PNC Bank Arts Center	
August 18, 2013	Wantagh	United States	Nikon at Jones Beach Theater	
August 20, 2013	Toronto	Canada	Molson Canadian Amphitheatre	Sons of Revelry
August 22, 2013	Tinley Park	United States	First Midwest Bank Amphitheatre	
August 23, 2013	Noblesville	United States	Klipsch Music Center	
August 24, 2013	Clarkston	United States	DTE Energy Music Theatre	
August 27, 2013	Oklahoma City	United States	Zoo Amphitheater	
August 28, 2013	Dallas	United States	Gexa Energy Pavilion	
August 29, 2013	The Woodlands	United States	Cynthia Woods Mitchell Pavilion	
August 31, 2013	Albuquerque	United States	Isleta Amphitheater	
September 1, 2013	Greenwood Village	United States	Fiddler's Green Amphitheatre	
September 2, 2013	West Valley City	United States	USANA Amphitheatre	
September 7, 2013	George	United States	The Gorge Amphitheatre *	
September 8, 2013	Ridgefield	United States	Sleep Country Amphitheater	
September 11, 2013	Mountain View	United States	Shoreline Amphitheatre	
September 13, 2013	Irvine	United States	Verizon Wireless Amphitheatre	
September 14, 2013	Phoenix	United States	Ak-Chin Pavilion	A Fall to Break
September 15, 2013	Chula Vista	United States	Sleep Train Amphitheatre	Rival Tides

- This show was part of KISW 99.9's Pain In The Grass *

== 2014 line-up ==
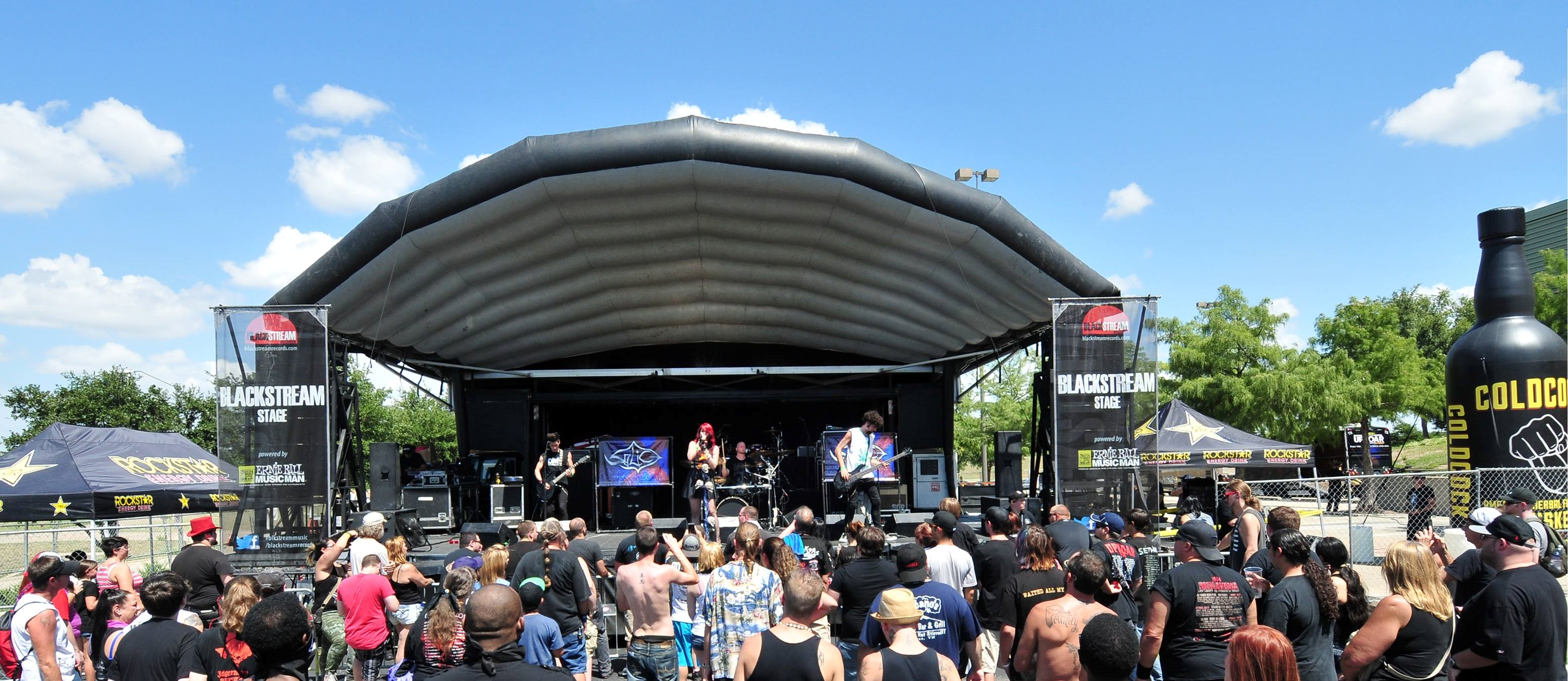
American alternative rock band Solice from Arlington performing Uproar Festival 2014 at Verizon Theatre in Grand Prairie, Texas

Main Stage

- Godsmack
- Seether
- Skillet
- Buckcherry

Blackstream Stage

- Pop Evil
- Escape the Fate
- Redlight King
- These Raven Skies
- Tattered
- Sons of Revelry
- 3 Years Hollow
- Within Reason
- New Medicine
- The Reality Of Yourself (T.R.O.Y)

=== 2014 tour dates ===
Date	City	Country	Venue
August 15, 2014	Detroit	United States	DTE Energy Music Theatre
August 16, 2014	Peru	United States	Illinois Valley Regional Airport
August 17, 2014	Cincinnati	United States	Riverbend Music Center
August 19, 2014	Pittsburgh	United States	Stage AE
August 20, 2014	Uncasville	United States	Mohegan Sun
August 22, 2014	Syracuse	United States	Great New York State Fair
August 23, 2014	Mount Pocono	United States	Mount Airy Casino Resort
August 24, 2014	Noblesville	United States	Klipsch Music Center
August 26, 2014	Camden	United States	Susquehanna Bank Center
August 27, 2014	Gilford	United States	Bank of New Hampshire Pavilion
August 29, 2014	Simpsonville	United States	Charter Amphitheater
August 30, 2014	Tampa	United States	MidFlorida Credit Union Amphitheatre
August 31, 2014	Gulfport	United States	Jones Park
September 2, 2014	Grand Prairie	United States	Verizon Theatre at Grand Prairie
September 3, 2014	Corpus Christi	United States	Concrete Street Amphitheater
September 5, 2014	Bonner Springs	United States	Cricket Wireless Amphitheater
September 6, 2014	Sioux City	United States	Tyson Events Center
September 7, 2014	Oklahoma City	United States	Zoo Amphitheatre
September 9, 2014	Broomfield	United States	1stBank Center
September 11, 2014	Post Falls	United States	Greyhound Park
September 12, 2014	Auburn	United States	White River Amphitheatre
September 16, 2014	Irvine	United States	Verizon Wireless Amphitheatre
September 17, 2014	Las Vegas	United States	The Joint
September 18, 2014	Phoenix	United States	Comerica Theatre
September 20, 2014	Albuquerque	United States	Isleta Amphitheater
September 21, 2014	Tucson	United States	Kino Veterans Memorial Stadium
