= Go for Broke (album) =

Studio album by Kazzer
- Released: 2002
- Genre: Rap rock; hip-hop
- Length: 43:11
- Label: Epic
- Producer: Tawgs; Kazzer; Ashton Price

Kazzer chronology
Go for Broke (2002)	Broke (2005)

Singles from Go for Broke
- 1. "Pedal to the Metal" Released: 2003

Go for Broke is the debut studio album by Canadian musician Kazzer, released in 2002 through Epic Records. The album's debut single, "Pedal to the Metal", charted on both the Australian and Canadian singles chart.

== Background ==
Mark Kasprzyk grew up in Binbrook, Ontario near Hamilton. At the age of 8, he began learning judo and became part of the Canadian National Judo Team and was an alternate for the Canadian team in the 2000 Summer Olympics. Being relegated to alternate status for the Olympics inspired him to pursue a career in music. At 16, Kasprzyk began songwriting, and after discovering hip-hop, took up breakdancing. Around this time, Mark produced a demo which made it into the hands of Epic Records (a subsidiary of Sony BMG).

Under his stage name Kazzer, Kasprzyk was signed to Epic Records in New York City and released his 2002 debut album Go for Broke in Canada, (Germany), France and Scandinavia. The lead single, "Pedal to the Metal", was co-written with Brian West, Grammy-nominated producer for the likes of Nelly Furtado. The song was featured on the soundtrack of the 2003 remake of The Italian Job. It charted at #71 on the Australian Singles Chart and #26 on the Canadian Singles Chart.

Kazzer was nominated for a New Artist of the Year at the 2004 Juno Awards.

== Track listing ==
Track listing per booklet.

No.	Title	Length
1.	"Pedal to the Metal"	3:29
2.	"You Don't Know"	3:42
3.	"For You"	3:09
4.	"Throwin' It Down"	3:09
5.	"Puddem Up"	3:20
6.	"Locked Tight"	4:16
7.	"Dreamin'"	3:21
8.	"Elements"	4:15
9.	"Eighties"	2:51
10.	"No Complaints"	2:16
11.	"Test Me"	2:56
12.	"Halfway Home"	3:11
13.	"When It Rains It Pours"	3:16
Total length:		43:11
