= M. Rivers =

Canadian musician

Mark Kasprzyk
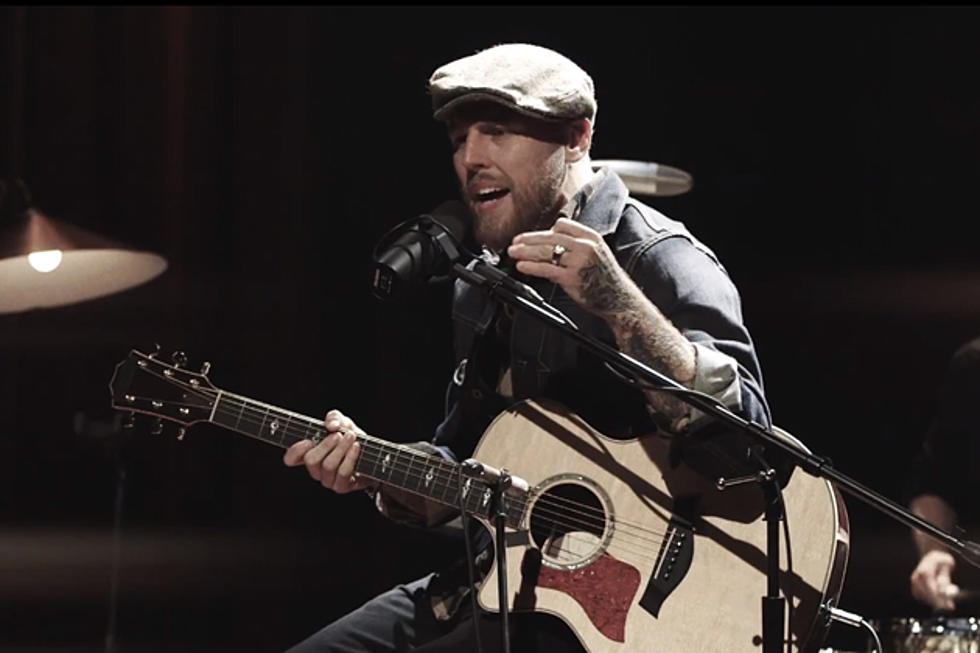
- Rivers in 2016

Background information
- Born: Mark Christopher Kasprzyk
- Origin: Hamilton, Ontario, Canada
- Genres: Alternative rock; rap rock; post-grunge; nu metal; alternative metal
- Occupation: Musician
- Instruments: Vocals; guitar
- Labels: Epic; Hollywood; Parts + Labor; AFM Records
- Member of: Redlight King

Mark Christopher Kasprzyk, referred to often as Kaz, Kazzer or M. Rivers, is a Canadian musician whose work has ranged from rap rock to alternative rock. He is the lead vocalist and lyricist of the rock band Redlight King, best known for their song "Bullet in My Hand", which was aired regularly on MuchMusic and MTV Europe, played on contemporary hit radio, hot adult contemporary, alternative rock and mainstream rock radio stations in Canada. He is also an auto sports television personality.

== History ==
Kasprzyk grew up in Binbrook, Ontario near Hamilton. At the age of 8, he began learning judo and became part of the Canadian National Judo Team and was an alternate for the Canadian team in the 2000 Summer Olympics. Being relegated to alternate status for the Olympics inspired him to pursue a career in music. At 16 Kasprzyk began songwriting, and after discovering hip-hop, took up breakdancing. Around this time, Mark produced a demo which made it into the hands of Epic Records (a subsidiary of Sony BMG).

=== Solo career ===
Under his stage name Kazzer, Kasprzyk was signed to Epic Records and released his 2002 debut album Go for Broke in Canada, (Germany), France and Scandinavia. The energetic lead single, "Pedal to the Metal", was co-written with Brian West, Grammy-nominated producer for the likes of Nelly Furtado. The song was featured on the soundtracks of the 2003 remake of The Italian Job, the 2004 film Catch That Kid on the television series Malcolm in the Middle, and in the Hotwheels Acceleracers movies. It was also featured in the opening "splash" animation and on the soundtrack of the Midway Sports video game NHL HITZ PRO. Additionally, his song "Fueled By Adrenaline" was featured on the Bugbear game Flatout Ultimate Carnage, as well as its PSP Port Flatout: Head On.

Kazzer was nominated for a New Artist of the Year at the 2004 Juno Awards. He has toured Canada repeatedly including a 2003 MTV Campus Invasion tour which on some dates he headlined and on others opened for Gob. He has performed at concerts and festivals in Europe, and opened for The Roots in Chicago, and for a New York Jets game.

Go for Broke sold 25,000 copies worldwide in 2003. Epic Records went through an executive change and Kazzer found himself without representation, and he moved to Linus Entertainment, a leading Canadian independent record label distributed by Universal Records.

Kazzer's second record Broke was mostly recorded at Morph Productions and mixed at EMAC Recording Studios and released on June 28, 2005, featuring the lead single "Ordinary".

=== Redlight King ===
Mark formed a new project called Redlight King in 2009 with longtime collaborator Julian Tomarin, and signed to Hollywood Records. Kasprzyk made news in 2011 for his success in securing permission from Neil Young to allow him to sample Young's 1972 song, "Old Man". The sample is included in the song "Old Man" (originally titled "Hardworking Hands") on his debut album Something for the Pain, released on June 28, 2011. Old Man peaked at number 17 on the Billboard Alternative Songs and Number 26 on the Billboard Hot Mainstream Rock Tracks.

Redlight King's most successful song and second single off Something for the Pain, "Bullet in My Hand", peaked at numbers 3 and 28 on Billboard's Hot Mainstream Rock Tracks and Alternative Songs charts, respectively. Redlight King was also a part of the Rockstar Energy Drink Uproar Festival 2012.

Redlight King released its second studio album Irons in the Fire on September 10, 2013. On July 9, 2013, they released a single from the album entitled "Born to Rise". The track appears in the end title credits for the 2014 film "Draft Day," starring Kevin Costner.

"Born To Rise" has also been used as the pregame music for the NHL's Anaheim Ducks and their AHL affiliate, the San Diego Gulls, and was the title track for the Feature Film "Draft Day" starring Kevin Costner.

=== M. Rivers ===
In 2017, Mark signed with Parts + Labor Records and released "Champion", a single produced by Jimmy Messer (Kelly Clarkson, Kygo, Awolnation). The song was featured on the Redlight King 2020 album Moonshine.

=== Other media ===
He has appeared in film and television, including a cameo appearance as a redneck in the 2004 MuchMusic comedy road movie Going the Distance. He was also one of many collaborators on Sports Car Revolution, aired on the US-based specialty television channel Speed Channel in 2005 and 2006. He has owned a 1962 Ford Thunderbird, a 1949 Mercury and a 1930 Ford Model A. Mark currently hosts a live streaming show called "MuscleKingz Lounge" on Facebook live.

== Discography ==
=== As Kazzer ===
==== Albums ====
- Go for Broke (2002) (Epic Records)
- Broke (2005) (Linus Entertainment)

==== Singles ====
| Year | Song | Peak chart positions | | Album |
| Year | Song | AUT | CAN | Album |
|---|---|---|---|---|
| 2002 | "Pedal to the Metal" | 71 | 26 | Go for Broke |
| 2005 | "Ordinary" | — | — | Broke |
"—" denotes a release that did not chart.

=== As Redlight King ===
==== Albums ====
| Year | Album details | Peak chart positions | | |
| Year | Album details | US | US Heat. | US Rock |
|---|---|---|---|---|
| 2011 | Something for the Pain: Released: June 28, 2011; Label: Hollywood; Formats: CD, DI | — | 3 | 50 |
| 2013 | Irons in the Fire: Released: September 10, 2013; Label: Hollywood; Formats: CD, DI | 152 | 4 | 45 |
| 2015 | Helldriver (EP): Released: June 9, 2015; Label: Redlight King Inc.; Formats: DI | — | — | — |
"—" denotes a release that did not chart.

==== Singles ====
| Year | Song | Peak chart positions | | | | | Album |
| Year | Song | CAN Alt. | CAN Rock | US Alt. | US Main. | US Rock | Album |
|---|---|---|---|---|---|---|---|
| 2011 | "Old Man" | 13 | 19 | 17 | 26 | 24 | Something for the Pain |
| 2011 | "Bullet in My Hand" | 35 | 15 | 28 | 3 | 12 | Something for the Pain |
| 2012 | "Comeback" | — | — | — | 18 | 36 | Something for the Pain |
| 2013 | "Born to Rise" | — | 31 | — | 9 | 30 | Irons in the Fire |
| 2014 | "Times Are Hard" | — | 21 | — | 10 | 31 | Irons in the Fire |
| 2014 | "Devil's Dance" | — | — | — | 34 | — | Irons in the Fire |
| 2019 | "Lift the Curse" | — | — | — | — | — | Moonshine (unreleased) |
"—" denotes a release that did not chart.

==== Music videos ====
| Year | Song | Director | Ref. |
|---|---|---|---|
| 2011 | "Old Man" | | |
| 2011 | "Bullet in My Hand" | | |
| 2011 | "City Life" | | |
| 2012 | "Comeback" | | |
| 2013 | "Born to Rise" | Strati Hovartos | |
| 2014 | "Times Are Hard" | Strati Hovartos | |

== See also ==
- Judo in Canada
