= The Throwdowns =

American music band

- Origin: Maui, Hawaii, Hawaii
- Genres: Punk Pop
- Years active: Since 2009
- Labels: Alternative Distribution Alliance
- Members: Erin Smith; Ian Hollinsworth; Ola Shaw; Kimo Clark
- Website: thethrowdowns.com

The Throwdowns is an American Canadian pop-island-reggae-dance band from Maui, Hawaii, formed in 2009.

The band released their first album, entitled Legs Of Our Own, on August 6, 2011.

In October 2010, The Throwdowns were nominated for two Na Hoku Hanohano Awards (Hawaiian Grammy's). The nominations were both for the "Don't Slow Down" EP: "Rock Album of the Year (Best performance of music in a rock style)" and "Design (Best designed and created album package)".

The band's style has been compared to The Clash, the Yeah Yeah Yeahs, No Doubt, and PJ Harvey.

== Discography ==
- Don't Slow Down (2009)
- Legs Of Our Own (2011)
- Love is Here To Stay (2012)
- Must Be The Wine (2020)
