= Vices and Virtues (Art of Dying album) =

Studio album by Art of Dying
- Released: March 22, 2011
- Genre: Hard rock; post-grunge; alternative metal
- Length: 42:35
- Label: Intoxication; Reprise
- Producer: Howard Benson; Dan Donegan

Art of Dying chronology
Art of Dying (2007)	Vices and Virtues (2011)	Rise Up (2015)

Singles from Vices and Virtues
- 1. "Die Trying" Released: March 22, 2011; 2. "Get Thru This" Released: July 3, 2011; 3. "Sorry" Released: February 4, 2012; 4. "Raining" Released: October 21, 2012

Professional ratings
Review scores
Source	Rating
Allmusic	3/5 stars
AHalfFast.com	4.5/5 stars
Metalholic	8.2/10

Vices and Virtues is the second studio album by Canadian rock band Art of Dying. It is the band's major label debut after signing under David Draiman and Dan Donegan's Intoxication Records. Coincidentally, alternative rock band Panic! at the Disco released their third album, also titled Vices & Virtues (not counting the ampersand), on the same day. As of September 2014, Vices and Virtues has sold over 50,000 copies.

== Track listing ==
Standard version
No.	Title	Writer(s)	Length
1.	"Die Trying"	Greg Bradley; Jonny Hetherington	3:49
2.	"Get Thru This (alternative version)"	Jonny Hetherington	2:43
3.	"Sorry"	Jonny Hetherington; Davor Vulama	4:25
4.	"Whole World's Crazy"	Hetherington; Tavis Stanley; Bradley; Cale Gontier	3:45
5.	"Completely"	Jonny Hetherington; David Mariacci; Greg Bradley	3:23
6.	"I Will Be There"	Jonny Hetherington	3:51
7.	"You Don't Know Me"	Jonny Hetherington; David Mariacci; Greg Bradley; Flavio Cirillo	3:06
8.	"Raining" (featuring Adam Gontier)	Jonny Hetherington	3:57
9.	"Best I Can"	Jonny Hetherington; Tavis Stanley; Greg Bradley; Cale Gontier	5:03
10.	"Straight Across My Mind"	Jonny Hetherington; Tavis Stanley; Greg Bradley; Adam Gontier; Cale Gontier	4:21
11.	"Breathe Again"	Jonny Hetherington; Tavis Stanley; Greg Bradley; Jeff Broen; Cale Gontier	4:12
Total length:			42:35

Deluxe edition
No.	Title	Length
12.	"Better Off"	3:00
13.	"Watching You Watching Me"	3:52
Total length:		49:27

== Personnel ==
- Jonny Hetherington – vocals
- Greg Bradley – guitar
- Jeff Brown – drums
- Cale Gontier – bass
- Tavis Stanley – guitar
- Adam Gontier – additional vocals on "Raining"

== Charts ==
Chart performance for Vices and Virtues
Chart (2011)	Peak position
Canadian Albums (Nielsen SoundScan)	93
US Billboard 200	117
US Heatseekers Albums (Billboard)	1
US Top Alternative Albums (Billboard)	21
US Top Hard Rock Albums (Billboard)	9
US Top Rock Albums (Billboard)	31
