= Jela Cello =

Serbian cellist

- Born: Jelena Mihailović; October 6, 1987 (age 37); Valjevo, SR Serbia, SFR Yugoslavia
- Occupation(s): Musician, composer, cellist

Jelena Mihailović (Serbian Cyrillic: Јелена Михаиловић; born 6 October 1987), also known as Jela Mihailovic, is a Serbian cellist based in Belgrade and Los Angeles who performs classical and contemporary music under the artistic name Jela Cello or JelaCello.

== Early life ==
Mihailović was born in Valjevo, Serbia.

== Career ==
During her solo career, Jela performed original pieces written for her and adapted to her own musical expression. One of these was the World Premiere of a piece called “Black Swan” written by Aleksandar Simic, which Jela performed on the occasion of the 10th anniversary of the Belgrade International Cello Festin July 2013. In 2011, Jela recorded the album Clash, which was released by PGP-RTS. The album contains eleven compositions from different genres and centuries, including covers of works by Bach, Ravel, Brahms, Jimi Hendrix and The Beatles. The songs were arranged for solo cello and symphony orchestra and produced by Aleksandar Habich. Clash was praised by critics and sold out the first edition. Her "Purple Haze" video has had over 1.5 million views. To perform the music from Clash live, Jela formed her own “Jela Cello Power Symphony Orchestra” in 2012 with sixty musicians. During 2012, the group had a sold-out tour, and earned the role of official ambassadors for Belgrade in its bid to become the cultural capital of Europe in 2020. This resulted in invitations to perform both classical and contemporary music. Jela is currently enrolled in doctoral studies at Megatrend University, preparing a European tour with her Jela Cello Power Symphony Orchestra, and is preparing material for a new album.

=== Recognition ===
Jela was awarded the "Golden Shield" and "Golden Charter" awards, which are given for dedication and creative contributions to culture by the Cultural and Educational Community of the Republic of Serbia.

== Discography ==
- Christmas Dreams - 2015
- Jela Cello - 2019
- Potraga Za Magičnim Violončelom (The Search for the Magic Cello) - 2019 - with Jela Cello Power Symphony Orchestra
