= 3 Years Hollow =

American rock band

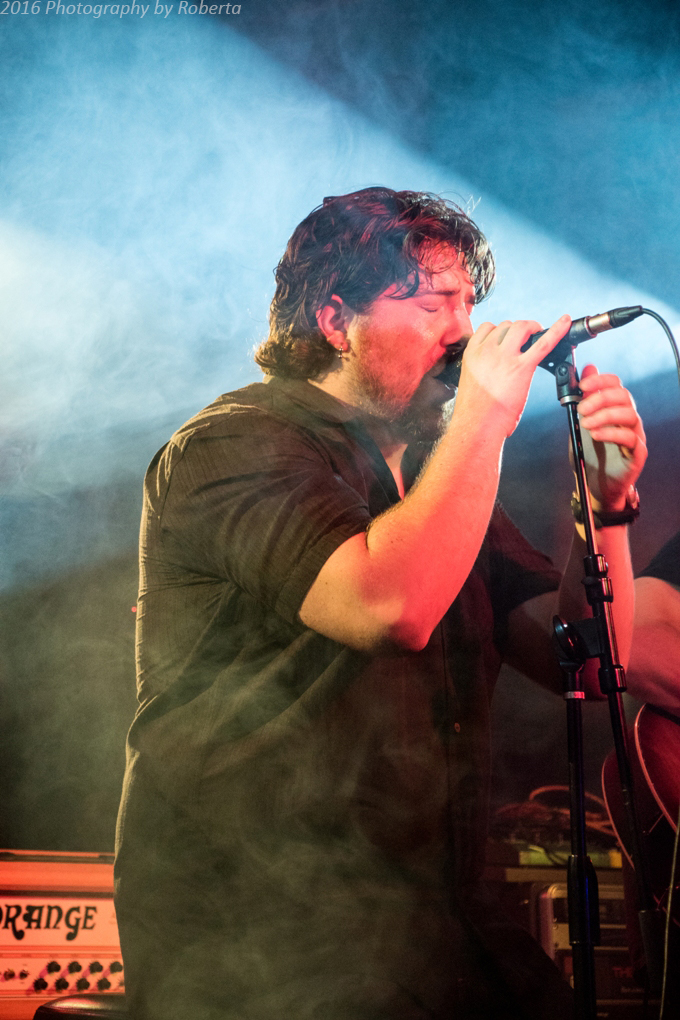
- 3 Years Hollow at Rascals Live, Moline, IL 4/22/16

Background information
- Origin: Quad Cities, IL/IA, United States
- Genres: Hard rock; alternative metal; post-grunge
- Years active: 2003–present
- Label: Imagen Records
- Members: Jose Urquiza; Tony Reeves; Chris Cushman; Dex Digga; Neil Kuhlman
- Past members: Luke Sears; Brian Holmland
- Website: www.3yearshollow.com

3 Years Hollow is an American rock band from the Quad Cities on the border of the US states of Iowa and Illinois. In 2014, the ensemble reached No. 23 on Top Heatseekers with studio album The Cracks. In 2014–2015, the group had two Top 40 singles on Billboard's Mainstream Rock chart. The group promoted The Cracks by touring with Sevendust, Nonpoint, Eye Empire, Saving Abel, Red, Gemini Syndrome, and Islander in 2014–2015. They were also part of the 2014 Rockstar Uproar Festival, with bands: Godsmack, Seether, Skillet, Pop Evil, Escape The Fate, and Buckcherry.

== Discography ==
=== Studio albums ===
Year	Album details	Peak chart positions
Year	Album details	US Heat.
2009	Ascension: Released: 2009	-
2014	The Cracks: Released: 02/11/2014	23
"—" denotes a release that did not chart.

=== Extended plays ===
- Remember (2012)

=== Singles ===
Title	Year	Peak chart positions	Album
Title	Year	US Main.	Album
"Remember"	2012	—	Remember (EP)
"Lost"	2012	—	Remember (EP)
"Hungry"	2014	36	The Cracks
"For Life (Feat. Clint Lowery)"	2014	34	The Cracks
"Chemical Ride"	2015	—	The Cracks
"You and I"	2018	—	Non-album single
"—" denotes a single that did not chart or was not released in that territory.
