= Mindset Evolution =

Former American hard rock band

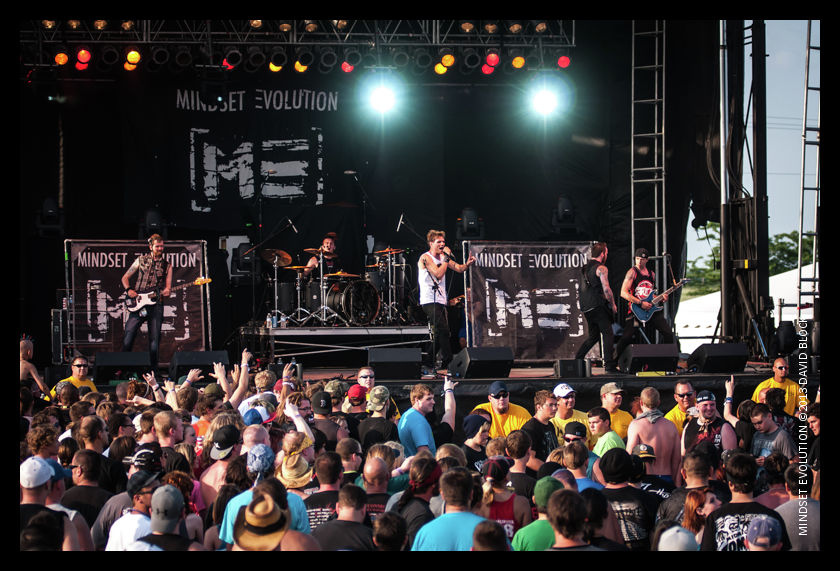
- Mindset Evolution at Rocklahoma

Background information
- Origin: Peoria, Illinois, United States
- Genres: Rock, alternative rock
- Years active: 2005–2017
- Labels: Prospect Park
- Past members: Rob Ulrich; Josh Bodeen; Zakk Burke; Brendan Summers; Tim Chapai; Joey Gibbs

Mindset Evolution (sometimes shortened to [ME] or Mindset) is an American hard rock band from Peoria, Illinois founded in 2005. The group released 3 albums independently (39 Miles West of Normal, Taking Back Today, and Prelude) prior to the success of the self-titled 2012 EP that gained the attention of Prospect Park who signed the band that year. In 2013 they released their first national effort Brave Bold & Broken. The current members are Rob Ulrich (Vocals), Josh Bodeen (Bass, backup vocals), Zakk Burke (Drums) Brendan Summers (lead guitar), and Tim Chapai (guitar)

== History ==
Formed originally by vocalist Rob Ulrich and bassist Josh Bodeen as an acoustic cover band, they later recruited a full band and started writing songs. In the Midwest tour circuit, they entered the 2011 Rockstar Uproar Festival Battle of the Bands with 5300 other hopefuls, and were awarded the win. They gained national traction as they secured a slot on the 2012 Uproar Festival.

== Brave Bold & Broken ==
Mindset began their tour cycle for Brave Bold & Broken at Rock on the Range. They performed as support for label-mates Korn's Reunion Tour with Head, followed by several dates with Buckcherry and an appearance at Rocklahoma. "Burn It Down" was the band's first success at active rock radio, first taking off on Octane (Sirius XM)'s Big Un's countdown, then breaking on to spend 15 weeks on the Billboard Mainstream Rock chart peaking at 30. They spent the summer touring with Fight or Flight followed by a two-week West Coast run of festivals with Avenged Sevenfold, Korn and Volbeat. They finished up 2013 with Gemini Syndrome, and Starset. They are currently writing and planning a new record.

== Members ==
Current

- Rob Ulrich – lead vocals (2005–present)
- Josh Bodeen - bass guitar, backing vocals (2005–present)
- Zakk Burke – drums (2016–present)
- Brendan Summers – lead guitar (2016–present)
- Tim Chapai – guitar (2008–2009, 2016–present)

Previous

- Skyler Baer – guitar (2011–2015)
- Aaron Birdsalli – drums (2015)
- Joey Gibbs – drums (2011–2015)
- Brad Prentice – guitar, backing vocals (2006–2014)
- Josh Blue – drums (2005–2010)

Timeline

== Discography ==
=== Studio albums ===
- 39 Miles West of Normal (Independent 2006)
- Taking Back Today (Independent 2009)
- Prelude (Independent 2011)
- Brave Bold & Broken (Prospect Park 2013)

=== Extended plays ===
- Self Title EP (Independent 2012)

=== Singles ===
Title	Year	Peak Chart Position US Main.	Album
"Burn It Down"	2014	30	Brave Bold & Broken
