= Candlelight Red =

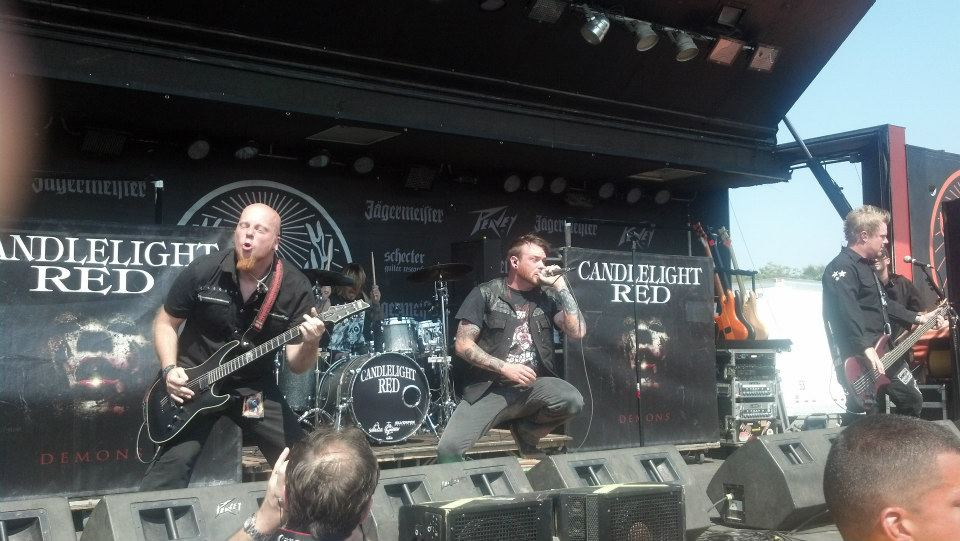
- From left to right: Jeremy Edge, Brian Dugan, Ryan Hoke and Jamie Morral performing at the Rockstar Energy Uproar Festival in Burgettstown, Pennsylvania in August, 2012

Background information
- Origin: Williamsport, Pennsylvania
- Genres: Hard rock, alternative rock, alternative metal
- Years active: 2011–present
- Label: Imagen Records
- Members: Jeremy Edge; Jamie Morral; Ryan Hoke; Brian Dugan
- Past members: Josh Hetrick; Tanner Wayne; Greg Locke; Adam Zimmer; Scott Sellers; Charlotte Kopp

Candlelight Red is a rock band from Williamsport, Pennsylvania. They released two studio albums and an EP in the early 2010s. Their EP Demons and album Reclamation were produced by Morgan Rose of Sevendust. The band took a break from touring in 2013, but when they began planning dates in 2014, vocalist Ryan Hoke announced he was leaving the band for a job opportunity "he felt he just could not pass up". CLR reunited in 2016 and performed several shows between May and December. The band has remained inactive since. Guitarist Jeremy Edge released a solo album in October 2020. The band including Lead Singer Ryan Hoke got back together and released a new 4 Song EP The Flood in January 2022.

== Early years ==
Candelight Red was formed from the merger of two prominent Pennsylvania bands. The founding members consisted of Backstreet Law Guitarist, Jeremy Edge, Bassist Adam Zimmer, and Drummer Josh Hetrick. Members Adam Zimmer and Josh Hetrick were previously part of the State College-based band Stept On. The group left their mark on the Pennsylvania music scene with two EPs and a reputation for sharing the stage with national acts such as Halestorm and Breaking Benjamin.

Edge had previously recorded four albums with his band Backstreet Law, later changing the name to Til December. This group also gained recognition for opening under various national acts and participating in events like the Jägermeister Music Tour. Following either their departure, or the dissolution of both groups, led to the formation of Candlelight Red, marking the beginning of a new chapter for the musicians involved.

== Breakthrough Years ==
The groups big breakthrough came when the rock group, Kiss, announced that they had been selected to receive a $10,000 shopping spree at Guitar Center. After reviewing thousands of entries, Kiss and Guitar Center chose for Candlelight Red to open at a concert slated for July 29, 2011, in Pittsburgh, Pennsylvania. This marked a significant milestone in the band's career, providing them with exposure and resources to further their musical endeavors.

== Reunion ==
In the summer of 2021, the band returned to the studio after a period of inactivity, with Rose not only taking on his previous role as a producer but also helping with songwriting and drumming.

On November 15, 2021 the group released their first single in eight years. Duly named The Flood, the group teamed up with Morgan Rose of Sevendust to record the EP of the same name. Produced by Rose, The Flood was recorded in East Moline, Illinois with Rose also contributing as a drummer for the record. The album's production saw a collaboration with producer and engineer Jose Urquiza (3 Years Hollow), who also mixed the album with Jay Ruston. Mastering was done by Andy Van Dette.

== Discography ==
=== Studio albums ===
- The Wreckage (2011)
- Reclamation (2013)

=== Extended plays ===
- Demons (2012)
- The Flood (2022)

=== Singles ===
Year	Song	Peak chart positions		Album
Year	Song	US Act. Rock	US Main. Rock	Album
2011	"Closer"	—	—	The Wreckage
2012	"She's Got the Look"	—	—	The Wreckage
2012	"Demons"	30	32	Demons
2013	"Feel the Same"	—	—	Reclamation
2021	"The Flood"	—	—	The Flood
"—" denotes a release that did not chart.
