= Redlight King =

Canadian-American rock band

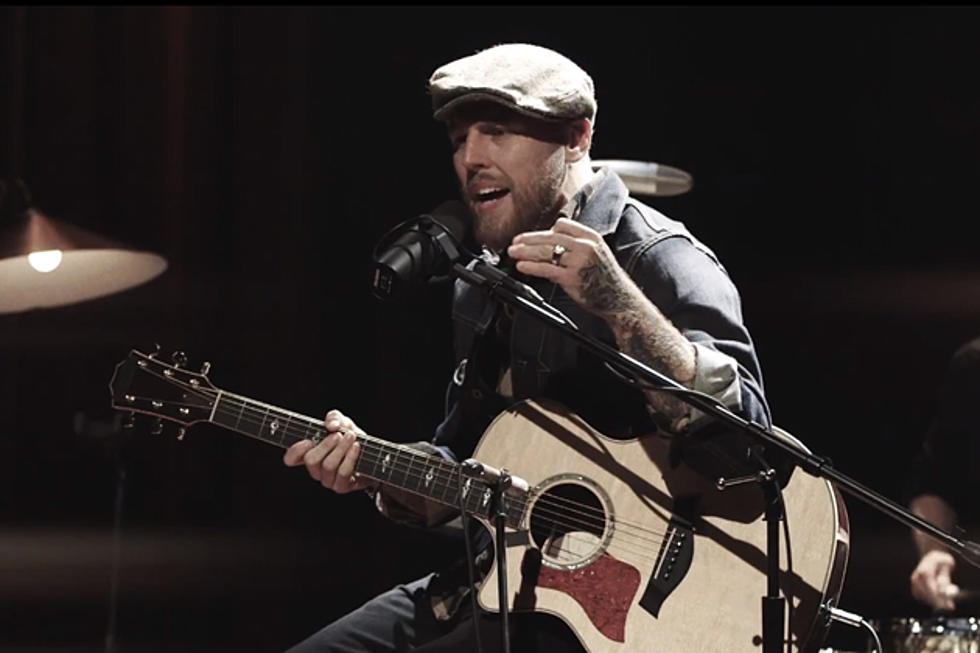

Background information
- Origin: Hamilton, Ontario, Canada
- Genres: Alternative rock; rap rock
- Years active: 2009–present
- Labels: Epic, Hollywood, Parts + Labor, AFM
- Members: Mark Kasprzyk; Julian Tomarin; Brian Weaver; Mark Goodwin
- Website: Official website

Redlight King is a Canadian-American rock band formed in Hamilton, Ontario in 2009. Redlight King have recorded two full-length albums and performed over 1,000 live shows including the largest festivals in North America and Europe. Their credits include over 100 live radio performances and musical guest appearances on both Late Night with Conan O'Brien and The Tonight Show with Jay Leno.

Their music has also been featured in such films as The Italian Job, Draft Day, Iron Man 3 and The Avengers, television shows such as Person of Interest, as well as having songs licensed to ESPN, NASCAR, NFL, CFL, NHL, NBA, and MLB.

== History ==
=== Career ===
Mark Kasprzyk formed Redlight King in 2009 with longtime collaborator Julian Tomarin, and signed to Hollywood Records. Kasprzyk made news in 2011 for his success in securing permission from Neil Young to allow him to sample Young's 1972 song, "Old Man". The sample is included in the song "Old Man" (originally titled "Hardworking Hands") on his debut album Something for the Pain, released on June 28, 2011. Old Man peaked at number 17 on the Billboard Alternative Songs and Number 26 on the Billboard Hot Mainstream Rock Tracks.

Redlight King's most successful song and second single off Something for the Pain, "Bullet in My Hand", peaked at numbers 3 and 28 on Billboard's Hot Mainstream Rock Tracks and Alternative Songs charts, respectively. Redlight King was also a part of the Rockstar Energy Drink Uproar Festival 2012.

Redlight King released its second studio album Irons In The Fire on September 10, 2013. On July 9, 2013, they released a single from the album entitled "Born to Rise". The track appears in the end title credits for the 2014 film "Draft Day," starring Kevin Costner.

"Born To Rise" has also been used as the pregame music for the NHL's Anaheim Ducks and their AHL affiliate, the San Diego Gulls, and was the title track for the Feature Film "Draft Day" starring Kevin Costner.

=== In Our Blood (2022-present) ===
On May 5, 2022, they released the first single "In Our Blood." It is the title track to their forthcoming album In Our Blood. On May 9, it was announced they signed to German label AFM Records who will release the album.

== Discography ==
=== Studio albums ===
Year	Album details	Peak chart positions		
Year	Album details	US	US Heat.	US Rock
2011	Something for the Pain: Released: June 28, 2011; Label: Hollywood; Formats: CD, DI	—	3	50
2013	Irons in the Fire: Released: September 10, 2013; Label: Hollywood; Formats: CD, DI	152	4	45
2020	Moonshine: Released: April 24, 2020; Label: Parts + Labor; Formats: CD, DI	—	—	—
"—" denotes a release that did not chart.

=== Extended plays ===
Year	Album details
2015	Helldiver: Released: June 9, 2015; Label: Redlight King Inc.; Formats: DI

=== Singles ===
Year	Song	Peak chart positions					Album
Year	Song	CAN Alt.	CAN Rock	US Alt.	US Main.	US Rock	Album
2011	"Old Man"	13	19	17	26	24	Something for the Pain
2011	"Bullet in My Hand"	35	15	28	3	12	Something for the Pain
2012	"Comeback"	—	—	—	18	36	Something for the Pain
2013	"Born to Rise"	—	31	—	9	30	Irons in the Fire
2014	"Times Are Hard"	—	21	—	10	31	Irons in the Fire
2014	"Devil's Dance"	—	—	—	34	—	Irons in the Fire
2019	"Lift the Curse"	—	—	—	—	—	Moonshine
2020	"Working Man" (Rush cover)	—	—	—	—	—	Moonshine
2022	"In Our Blood"	—	—	—	—	—	In Our Blood
"—" denotes a release that did not chart.

=== Music Videos ===
Year	Song	Director
2011	"Old Man"	Paul Minor
2011	"City Life"	
2011	"Bullet In My Hand"	
2012	"Comeback"	Chris Stacey
2013	"Born to Rise"	Strati Hovartos
2014	"Times Are Hard"	Strati Hovartos
2019	"Lift the Curse"	Chris Stacey
2020	"Don't Drink the Water"	Sabyn Mayfield
2020	"Long Way to Heaven"	
2021	"Ain't Going Easy"	Strati Havartos
2022	"In Our Blood"	Strati Havartos
2022	"Cold Killer"	Strati Havartos
2022	"Heavy Heart"	Strati Havartos

=== Features ===
- "Hear Our Battle Cry" - Sonic Hijackers, Redlight King
- "Dig Deep" - Sonic Hijackers, Redlight King
- "Run This Town Tonight" - Sonic Hijackers, Redlight King
- "Hard Life" - Redlight King, Robbery Inc.
- "Save You" - Manafest, Redlight King
