= Art of Dying (band) =

Canadian rock band

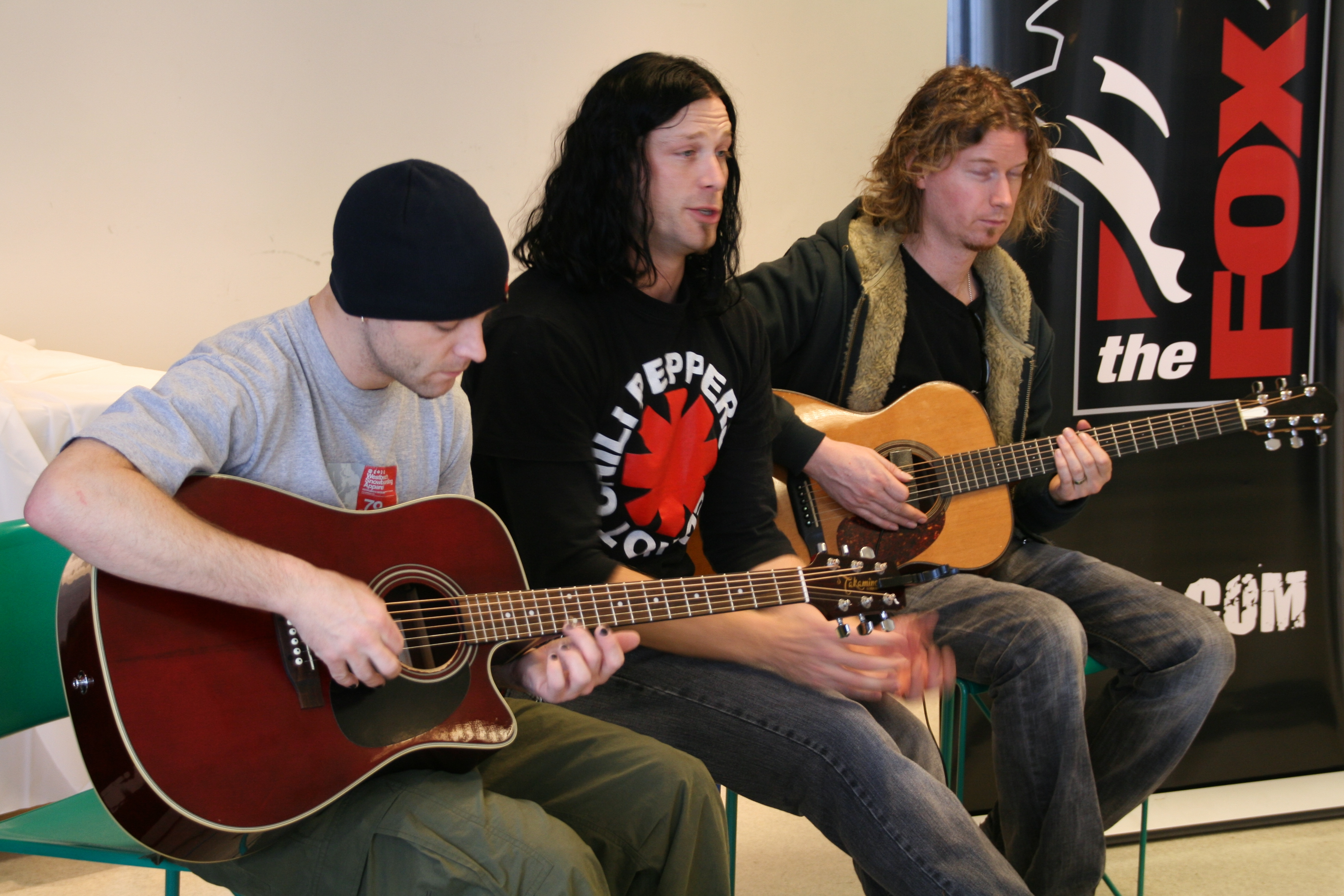
- Art of Dying in 2007

Background information
- Origin: Vancouver, British Columbia, Canada
- Genres: Alternative rock; alternative metal; hard rock; post-grunge
- Years active: 2004–present
- Labels: Thorny Bleeder/Intoxication; Reprise; Better Noise; Revolver; Vices and Virtues
- Members: Jonny Hetherington; Tavis Stanley
- Past members: Chris Witoski; Matt Rhode; Flavio Cirillo; Greg Bradley; Jeff Brown; Cale Gontier; Cody Watkins
- Website: artofdyingmusic.com

Art of Dying is a Canadian rock band from Vancouver, British Columbia, formed in 2004 by lead singer Jonny Hetherington and guitarist Greg Bradley. Soon after, the duo added Chris Witoski on rhythm guitar, bassist Matt Rhode, and drummer Flavio Cirillo.

Combing elements of post-grunge and alternative metal, the band's music makes prominent use of three-part harmony.

== History ==
In 2006, Art of Dying released their first album, Art of Dying on Thorny Bleeder Records. In February 2007, Classic Rock Magazine released the compilation Classic Rock: The Bands You Need to Hear in 2007, and included the Art of Dying song "Completely". The band then supported Seether on the UK leg of their world tour.

On December 1, 2009, it was announced that the band had signed a record deal with Reprise Records and its division Intoxication Records, founded by Disturbed members David Draiman and Dan Donegan. Witoski and Rhode left the band and were replaced by bassist Cale Gontier and guitarist Tavis Stanley, both previously of the band Thornley.

Art of Dying's second album, Vices and Virtues, produced by Howard Benson and mixed by Chris Lord-Alge, was released on March 22, 2011. Art of Dying went on its 'Avalanche Tour', performing 128 concerts in 2011. In addition to headlining and co-headlining club shows, the band played some of the biggest hard rock and heavy metal festivals in the country. They played the 2011 and 2012 Avalanche Tours, headlined by Stone Sour and Shinedown, respectively, and toured on Rockstar's 2011 Uproar Festival, headlined by Avenged Sevenfold.

Let the Fire Burn, a completely acoustic album, was released on April 24, 2012. The band continued to tour heavily in the US, playing several dates with Papa Roach and Buckcherry, opening for Marilyn Manson and appearing at the Rock Vegas Festival and KUPD's first annual Desert Uprising in Phoenix.

In 2014, Art of Dying was signed to Better Noise Records (now Better Noise Music). In 2015, the band toured as the opening act for the cello-metal band Apocalyptica during the North American leg of its Shadowmaker tour. In December 2015, they released the album Rise Up. It was produced by David Bendeth at House of Loud and received excellent reviews.

In 2016, the band self-released the six-track EP Nevermore and stayed on the road.

In 2017, Art of Dying announced on Facebook that drummer Jeff Brown, who had replaced Flavio Cirillo in 2008, left the band to "pursue a different path". He was replaced by longtime drum tech and stage manager Cody Watkins.

In 2019, still without a label, the band released its fifth album, Armageddon.

In 2020, Thorny Bleeder Records released the 11-track Art of Dying Compilation album, Demos & Rarities (2003-2007).

== Band members ==
Current

- Jonny Hetherington – lead vocals (2004–present)
- Tavis Stanley – rhythm guitar, backing vocals (2008–present), lead guitar (2015–present), drums (2023–present), bass (2025–present)

Former

- Chris Witoski – rhythm guitar (2004–2008)
- Matt Rhode – bass (2004–2008)
- Flavio Cirillo – drums (2004–2008)
- Greg Bradley – lead guitar (2004–2015)
- Jeff Brown – drums (2008–2016)
- Cale Gontier – bass, backing vocals (2008–2025)
- Cody Watkins – drums, backing vocals (2016–2023)

Timeline

== Discography ==
Studio albums

- Art of Dying (2006), Thorny Bleeder Records
- Vices and Virtues (2011), Reprise Records
- Let the Fire Burn (2012), Thorny Bleeder Records
- Rise Up (2015), Better Noise Music, Eleven Seven Music
- Armageddon (2019), Vices and Virtues Music
- Won't Look Back (2024), Vices and Virtues Music
- Any Day Now (2026), Vices and Virtues Music
- The Ruliad (2026)

EPs

- Get Through This (2007), Revolver Records
- Rise Up (2015), Better Noise Music
- Nevermore (2016), Vices and Virtues Music
- Nevermore Acoustic (2017), Vices and Virtues Music
- Ready for a Good Time (2022), Vices and Virtues Music

Compilations

- Demos & Rarities (2003–2007) (2020), Thorny Bleeder Records

=== Singles ===
| Year | Song | Peak chart positions | | | | Album |
| Year | Song | CAN Rock | US Alt | US Main | US Rock | Album |
|---|---|---|---|---|---|---|
| 2007 | "Get Through This" | × | × | 23 | × | Art of Dying |
| 2011 | "Die Trying" | 18 | 40 | 6 | 21 | Vices and Virtues |
| 2011 | "Get Thru This" | 43 | — | 18 | 34 | Vices and Virtues |
| 2012 | "Sorry" | 19 | — | 15 | 37 | Vices and Virtues |
| 2013 | "Raining" (featuring Adam Gontier) | 31 | — | — | — | Vices and Virtues |
| 2015 | "Rise Up" (featuring Dan Donegan) | 33 | — | — | — | Rise Up |
| 2015 | "Tear Down the Wall" | × | × | × | × | Rise Up |
| 2015 | "Everything" | — | — | 36 | — | Rise Up |
| 2016 | "Moth to a Flame" | × | × | × | × | Rise Up |
| 2016 | "Torn Down" | × | × | × | × | Nevermore |
| 2017 | "All or Nothing" | × | × | × | × | Nevermore |
| 2019 | "Cut it All Away" | × | × | × | × | Armageddon |
| 2019 | "Do or Die" | × | × | × | × | Armageddon |
| 2019 | "Armageddon" | × | × | × | × | Armageddon |
| 2019 | "Dark Days" | × | × | × | × | Armageddon |
| 2019 | "No One Ever Wins" | × | × | × | × | Armageddon |
| 2020 | "Vices & Virtues" | × | × | × | × | Ready for a Good Time |
| 2021 | "Afterlife" (with the Veer Union) | × | × | × | × | Non-album single |
| 2021 | "That High" | × | × | × | × | Ready for a Good Time |
| 2021 | "Cemetery" | × | × | × | × | Ready for a Good Time |
| 2022 | "Stand My Ground" | × | × | × | × | Ready for a Good Time |
| 2022 | "Prisoner" | × | × | × | × | Ready for a Good Time |
| 2022 | "Sweet Emotion" | × | × | × | × | Ready for a Good Time |
| 2022 | "Ready for a Good Time" | × | × | × | × | Ready for a Good Time |
| 2022 | "Better Dayz" | × | × | × | × | Won't Look Back |
| 2022 | "Just to See You Smile" | × | × | × | × | Won't Look Back |
| 2022 | "Long Shot" (featuring Jason Hook) | × | × | × | × | Won't Look Back |
| 2022 | "Lay Down and Die" | × | × | × | × | Won't Look Back |
| 2023 | "Let's Go" | × | × | × | × | Won't Look Back |
| 2023 | "So Far Gone" (featuring Thousand Foot Krutch) | × | × | × | × | The End Is Where We Begin: Reignited/Won't Look Back |
| 2023 | "Phoenix" | × | × | × | × | Won't Look Back |
| 2023 | "All Too Real" | × | × | × | × | Won't Look Back |
| 2024 | "Best of Me" | × | × | × | × | Won't Look Back |
| 2024 | "Falling" | × | × | × | × | Won't Look Back |
| 2024 | "Way Down We Go" | × | × | × | × | Non-album single |
| 2024 | "Through You" (featuring Adelitas Way) | × | × | × | × | Won't Look Back |
| 2024 | "Nevermore" | × | × | × | × | Nevermore/Won't Look Back |
| 2024 | "Won't Look Back" | × | × | × | × | Won't Look Back |
| 2024 | "Come Back from Nothing" | × | × | × | × | Non-album singles |
| 2024 | "Die Hard Christmas" | × | × | × | × | Non-album singles |
| 2025 | "Ocean" | × | × | × | × | Non-album singles |

== Music videos ==
List of music videos, showing year released and director
| Title | Year | Director(s) |
|---|---|---|
| "Get Through This" | 2007 | Brian Adler |
| "Completely" | 2007 | Darryl Whetung, John Allan |
| "I Will Be There" | 2008 | Unknown |
| "Die Trying" | 2011 | Andrew Bennet |
| "Get Thru This" | 2011 | Brian Adler |
| "Rise Up" | 2015 | Chad Archibald |
| "Torn Down" | 2016 | Davo |
| "All or Nothing" | 2017 | Davo |
| "Come Back From Nothing" | 2024 | Unknown |
