= Feathers & Flesh =

Studio album by Avatar
- Released: 13 May 2016; 2 June 2017 (2CD version)
- Studios: Castle Studios Röhrsdorf, Germany; Suomenlinnan Studio Helsinki, Finland; Spinroad Studios Lindome, Sweden
- Genres: Alternative metal; groove metal; melodic death metal; hard rock
- Length: 67:51
- Label: Entertainment One
- Producer: Sylvia Massy

Avatar chronology
Hail the Apocalypse (2014)	Feathers & Flesh (2016)	Avatar Country (2018)

Singles from Feathers & Flesh
- 1. "For the Swarm" Released: 3 March 2016; 2. "Regret" Released: 17 March 2016; 3. "House of Eternal Hunt" Released: 17 March 2016; 4. "The Eagle Has Landed" Released: 25 March 2016; 5. "Tooth, Beak & Claw" Released: 15 April 2016; 6. "Night Never Ending" Released: 2016; 7. "New Land" Released: 5 January 2017

Professional ratings
Review scores
Source	Rating
AntiHero Magazine	4/5 stars
Metalunderground	5/5
Metalholic	9/10

Feathers & Flesh is the sixth studio album by Swedish heavy metal band Avatar, released on 13 May 2016. A concept album, it is the story of an owl who goes to war to bring on an eternal night and the eagle, who represents the day, fighting to stop her. An extended 2CD version titled Feathers & Flesh (In His Own Words) was released on June 2, 2017. It consists of the regular album and 15 spoken word interludes told by Eckerström, expanding on the story told on the regular tracks.

== Background ==
After several tours supporting 2014's Hail the Apocalypse, Avatar entered the studio in December 2015 to begin recording a then unnamed follow-up studio album. The band split their time between three European studios — Castle Studios in Rohrsdorf, Germany, Suomenlinnan Studio in Helsinki, Finland, and Spinroad Studios in Lindome, Sweden. Acclaimed producer Sylvia Massy, noted for her work with Tool and Red Hot Chili Peppers, praised Avatar as 'relentless', noting singer Johannes Eckerström as having 'wild energy and charisma'. Keyboard arrangements for the album were made by Aron Parmerud. The start of recording sessions also coincided with multiple updates via the band's Instagram account, chronicling their time in the studio. Once recording finished, Avatar took part in Shiprocked 2016, then toured the southern United States with September Mourning and Saint Diablo. On 30 January 2016 in Dallas, Texas, Avatar performed the song For The Swarm, for the first time, the first original song since the release of their previous album.

The February/March 2016 issue of Revolver interviewed Eckerström, who described the concept behind the latest album.

It's about this owl who goes to war against the world to prevent the sun from rising. It's a fable inspired by the work of the famous French fable writer Jean de La Fontaine, so the creatures in the fable represent a side of the human psyche or different behaviors. Something good or bad happens to them depending on what they do in the story, and at the end you learn some kind of lesson.

On 29 February 2016, Avatar began posting random images on their Instagram, referencing the date '3.3.16'. The images turned out to be the cover art for the album when put together. Avatar further teased its fans to listen to SiriusXM's Octane at 4 pm on 2 March 2016. This turned out to be the broadcast premier of For The Swarm. On 3 March 2016, Avatar revealed the name of the new album, Feathers & Flesh, as well as a release date of 13 May 2016 via their official website, and through social media. Several pre-ordering merchandise bundles were made available to order on 17 March 2016. One bundle offers a 60-page, 109-verse poem hardcover book described on the band's Facebook as 'a story too extensive for any booklet'. As an extra, the singles Regret and House of Eternal Hunt were released to coincide with pre-order availability. Tour dates across North America featuring Wilson and Sunflower Dead were also announced.

== Release and promotion ==
Avatar released a music video for the single, "For the Swarm" on 3 March 2016. Directed by longtime collaborator Johan Carlén, it features the band on a series of cubes, rotating and floating through the air, showcasing their unique apparel. The video was voted number 1 in Loudwire's Battle Royale for the week ending 11 March 2016.

On 17 March 2016, the singles "Regret" and "House of Eternal Hunt" were released to help kick off pre-ordering of merchandise bundles for Feathers & Flesh. A video directed by Johan Carlén was released featuring the two songs playing sequentially as the view pans around a darkened art gallery, with many paintings of birds, primarily owls, mirroring some of the artwork that the band has created for the individual songs on their album. "Regret", as the opening track on the album, is described by the band as "an intense journey through epicness" and, "...by far the most different album intro [we have] ever written." The song introduces 'The Owl', the protagonist of the album as she lays dying, reflecting on her past. "House of Eternal Hunt", described by the band as "the definition of metal", starts the tale of The Owl, a "predator ruling the sky" according to Eckerström.

The first 'official' single, "The Eagle Has Landed", was released 25 March 2016. As with the previously released singles, the track was an instant gratification reward for pre-ordering Feathers & Flesh. The official music video for the track was released 9 May 2016. In the video, Avatar are shown as the makers of a miracle tonic, with Eckerström as the salesman. He sells his tonic to three unwitting victims: a farmer unable to reach the last apple at the top of a tree, a former bodybuilder sick with old age, and a young man trying to offer his heart to a young girl. The tonic proves successful, however with tragic side effects. The farmer's arms grow to more than twice their normal length, the old man regains his strength however he is plagued with horrible sores and wounds, and the young man literally offers his heart to his beloved by cutting it out of his chest. The victims get together and ambush Eckerström. Before he meets his demise however, The Eagle appears in a flash of lightning, scaring off his would be killers. Moments later, it is revealed The Eagle was actually the other members of Avatar.

"Tooth, Beak & Claw" was released on 15 April 2016, Eckerström described the song as "...The Beach Boys reporting in from Valhalla. It's a gang of zombie surfers riding the waves of Hades." Introducing 'The Eyes', they "represent all of us at our most fierce and dangerous, ready to fight blindly and full of rage for a cause we may not even fully understand." Eckerström used shifting vocal styles for this song, while Loudwire described the guitars as "riffing aplenty". Those who pre-ordered Feathers & Flesh received the song for free.

A video for "Night Never Ending" was released on 3 October 2016. Directed by Johan Carlén, singer Johannes Eckerström noted the song as a "fragile message of hope and fighting spirit" while calling it a "a prelude to a tragedy", as well as "probably the most upbeat and, dare I say, happy piece we've ever released." In the video, a young girl in a blue dress is being chased through a darkened forest by three childlike beings clad in white clothing and wearing animal masks: a bear, a wolf and a raven. At one point one of them removes their mask to reveal a decayed skull like face underneath. Meanwhile, two men with a bloodhound are shown in the bright of day, attempting to track something through the same woods. During the chase, one of the beings summons a large gust of wind which temporarily slows the two trackers. Back in the dark woods, the little girl coughs up water as the three gather around her. They present her with a small toy shown at the beginning of the video, as well as a mask of her own, an owl. Back in the light, the trackers come to a creek where they find the deceased body of the girl in the blue dress floating in the water. Wading into the water, one of the men, presumably her father, cradles the lifeless body in his arms as he wails into the sky. We then see the face of Johannes Eckerström, as all four children surround him. They all slowly turn and walk off into the darkness together as the video fades to black.

Another single, New Land, was released in 2017.

== Track listing ==
All music is composed by Avatar. All lyrics are written by Avatar.

No.	Title	Length
1.	"Regret"	2:01
2.	"House of Eternal Hunt"	4:58
3.	"The Eagle Has Landed"	5:01
4.	"New Land"	4:31
5.	"Tooth, Beak & Claw"	4:25
6.	"For the Swarm"	1:54
7.	"Fiddler's Farewell"	4:57
8.	"One More Hill"	4:13
9.	"Black Waters"	5:38
10.	"Night Never Ending"	3:32
11.	"Pray the Sun Away"	5:30
12.	"When the Snow Lies Red"	5:16
13.	"Raven Wine"	4:36
14.	"Sky Burial (Note: On the extended 2CD version, the title is written as "Sky Burial...")"	6:54
Total length:		63:26

Deluxe Edition
No.	Title	Length
15.	"I've Got Something in My Front Pocket for You" (South Park cover)	1:17
16.	"Det Är Alldeles Försent" (It's Far Too Late)	3:08
Total length:		67:51

The spoken word tracks of Feathers & Flesh (In His Own Words) are set in between each of the songs, with the first and last track bookending the tracklist.

No.	Title	Length
1.	"An Ancient Old Tale"	2:59
2.	"Each Feather A Blade"	0:43
3.	"Wild, Hungry Eyes"	1:56
4.	"Feed"	3:54
5.	"Stars Among Leaves"	1:33
6.	"Just a Few More"	2:37
7.	"To Deaf Ears"	1:22
8.	"Wickedly They Play"	3:26
9.	"In the Deep"	1:24
10.	"Cutting Skies From Her Eye"	3:09
11.	"A Very Old Song"	3:33
12.	"Eat or be Eaten"	3:48
13.	"Far Too Much Pain"	1:22
14.	"...And The Death Of A Bird"	0:43
15.	"You'll Continue To Suffer"	1:58

== Personnel ==
=== Avatar ===
- Johannes Eckerström – lead vocals
- Jonas "Kungen" Jarlsby – guitar
- Tim Öhrström – guitar, backing vocals
- Henrik Sandelin – bass, backing vocals
- John Alfredsson – drums

== Charts ==
Chart (2016)	Peak position
Belgian Albums (Ultratop Flanders)	135
US Billboard 200	88
