= Hunter Gatherer (album) =

Studio album by Avatar
- Released: 7 August 2020
- Studio: Sphere Studios, Burbank, California, US; Suomenlinnan Studio in Helsinki, Finland; Spinroad Studios in Lindome, Sweden
- Genre: Melodic death metal; alternative metal; groove metal; metalcore
- Length: 45:28
- Label: eOne; Century Media
- Producer: Jay Ruston

Avatar chronology
Avatar Country (2018)	Hunter Gatherer (2020)	Dance Devil Dance (2023)

Singles from Hunter Gatherer
- 1. "Silence in the Age of Apes" Released: 14 May 2020; 2. "God of Sick Dreams" Released: 11 June 2020; 3. "Colossus" Released: 9 July 2020

Hunter Gatherer is the eighth studio album by Swedish heavy metal band Avatar, released on 7 August 2020.

== Background ==
The band recorded their eighth studio album at Sphere Studios in Burbank, California, US, with additional overdubs at Suomenlinnan Studio in Helsinki, Finland, and Spinroad Studios in Lindome, Sweden. Jay Ruston returned as producer; he had produced the band's previous album Avatar Country.

== Song information ==
Avatar released their first music video of the album for the song "Silence in the Age of Apes" on 14 May 2020. The song was said to be inspired by a book by Yuval Noah Harari called Sapiens: A Brief History of Humankind. The band later released a music video for "Colossus".

== Track listing ==
No.	Title	Length
1.	"Silence in the Age of Apes"	4:21
2.	"Colossus"	4:01
3.	"A Secret Door"	6:06
4.	"God of Sick Dreams"	3:57
5.	"Scream Until You Wake"	4:10
6.	"Child"	5:33
7.	"Justice"	4:41
8.	"Gun"	4:31
9.	"When All but Force Has Failed"	2:48
10.	"Wormhole"	5:20
Total length:		45:28

== Personnel ==
- Jonas "Kungen" Jarlsby – guitars
- John Alfredsson – drums
- Johannes Eckerström – lead vocals
- Henrik Sandelin – bass, backing vocals
- Tim Öhrström – guitars, backing vocals

== Charts ==
Chart performance for Hunter Gatherer
Chart (2020)	Peak position
Austrian Albums (Ö3 Austria)	70
Belgian Albums (Ultratop Flanders)	51
Belgian Albums (Ultratop Wallonia)	43
French Albums (SNEP)	107
German Albums (Offizielle Top 100)	79
Scottish Albums (OCC)	97
