= Avatar Country =

Studio album by Avatar
- Released: 12 January 2018
- Recorded: 2017
- Studio: Spinroad, Lindome, Sweden
- Genre: Alternative metal; melodic death metal; heavy metal
- Length: 43:18
- Label: eOne; Century Media
- Producer: Jay Ruston

Avatar chronology
Feathers & Flesh (2016)	Avatar Country (2018)	Hunter Gatherer (2020)

Singles from Avatar Country
- 1. "A Statue of the King" Released: 24 October 2017; 2. "The King Wants You" Released: 19 December 2017; 3. "The King Welcomes You to Avatar Country" Released: 23 May 2018

Professional ratings
Review scores
Source	Rating
Blabbermouth.net	7/10 stars
Metal Injection	8/10 stars

Avatar Country is the seventh studio album by Swedish heavy metal band Avatar, released on 12 January 2018. It is a concept album.

== Background ==
The band recorded their seventh studio album throughout Summer 2017 at Spinroad Studios in Lindome, Sweden. The album was produced by Jay Ruston, noted for working with Stone Sour, Anthrax and Steel Panther. Keyboards and orchestral arrangements were provided by Aron Parmerud.

Avatar took part in the Avatar Country World Tour 2017, touring the United States from January to February 2018, and various countries in Europe from March to April, with The Brains and freakshow attraction Hellzapoppin'. Just one night before the album's release, in New York City, Avatar performed six songs from the album for the first time, along with songs from their previous albums.

== Song information ==
Avatar released music videos for three songs on the album; "A Statue of the King" on 24 October 2017, "The King Wants You" on 19 December 2017, and "The King Welcomes You to Avatar Country" on 23 May 2018. All three videos were directed by longtime collaborator Johan Carlén.

Avatar also called the opening track, "Glory to Our King", the album's "national anthem". Notably, every song on the track listing has the word "King" in its name.

== Track listing ==
No.	Title	Length
1.	"Glory to Our King"	0:51
2.	"Legend of the King"	8:17
3.	"The King Welcomes You to Avatar Country"	5:36
4.	"King's Harvest"	3:55
5.	"The King Wants You"	4:20
6.	"The King Speaks"	3:17
7.	"A Statue of the King"	3:44
8.	"King After King"	5:07
9.	"Silent Songs of the King Pt. 1: Winter Comes When the King Dreams of Snow"	3:34
10.	"Silent Songs of the King Pt. 2: The King's Palace"	4:37
Total length:		43:18

== Personnel ==
=== Avatar ===
- Johannes Eckerström – lead vocals
- Jonas "Kungen" Jarlsby – guitar
- Tim Öhrström – guitar, backing vocals
- Henrik Sandelin – bass, backing vocals
- John Alfredsson – drums

== Charts ==
Chart (2018)	Peak position
Belgian Albums (Ultratop Flanders)	90
Belgian Albums (Ultratop Wallonia)	161
Swiss Albums (Schweizer Hitparade)	87
US Billboard 200	132
US Independent Albums (Billboard)	2
