= Black Waltz =

Studio album by Avatar
- Released: 25 January 2012
- Genres: Alternative metal; groove metal; melodic death metal
- Length: 54:48
- Label: Gain Music Entertainment
- Producer: Tobias Lindell

Avatar chronology
Avatar (2009)	Black Waltz (2012)	Hail the Apocalypse (2014)

Black Waltz is the fourth studio album by Swedish heavy metal band Avatar, released on 25 January 2012. (In the US, it was released on 14 February 2012.) It is the band's last album to feature long-time guitarist Simon Andersson, who left the band in February 2012 to focus on his studies.

During the making of the "Black Waltz" music video, the band asked their makeup artist to come with something to make frontman Johannes Eckerström fit in with the characters, and she responded with the "Clown" face paint, which Eckerström is also seen wearing on the album cover. Eckerström has said, "... Something clicked... seeing that face, it awakened something that really wasn't there before; or was but was well hidden... Suddenly the music got its face." He now regularly wears the face paint in music videos and band photo shoots, as well as during live shows.

In a French book collecting artists' speech about the Hellfest Open Air festival, Eckerström declared that "Black Waltz" almost was the band's last album, frustrated that they could not find their own way. The singer says "we decided to do a last effort, some sort of statement, to tell the world we were here, that we existed. As we were not awaiting anything from our career, we decided, for the first time, to make the album that represented us. We learned to write for ourselves, without caring about the opinion of anyone else. And this formula worked!"

The album reached position 25 on the album list in Avatar's native Sweden.

== Track listing ==
No.	Title	Length
1.	"Let Us Die"	4:12
2.	"Torn Apart"	6:29
3.	"Ready for the Ride"	3:14
4.	"Napalm"	5:32
5.	"Black Waltz"	5:58
6.	"Blod"	3:34
7.	"Let It Burn"	3:32
8.	"One Touch"	4:17
9.	"Paint Me Red"	4:27
10.	"Smells Like a Freakshow"	4:53
11.	"Use Your Tongue"	9:33
Total length:		54:48

Deluxe Edition
No.	Title	Length
12.	"Dying to See You Dead"	3:34
13.	"Smells Like a Freakshow (Radio Edit)"	4:01
14.	"Smells Like a Freakshow (Walter Backlin Retro Mix)"	4:30
15.	"Torn Apart (Live at Sticky Fingers)"	6:58
Total length:		73:51

== Personnel ==
=== Avatar ===
- Johannes Eckerström – lead vocals
- Jonas "Kungen" Jarlsby – guitar
- Simon Andersson – guitar, backing vocals
- Henrik Sandelin – bass, backing vocals
- John Alfredsson – drums

== Charts ==
Chart	Peak position
Swedish Albums (Sverigetopplistan)	25
