= Avatar (band) =

Swedish heavy metal band

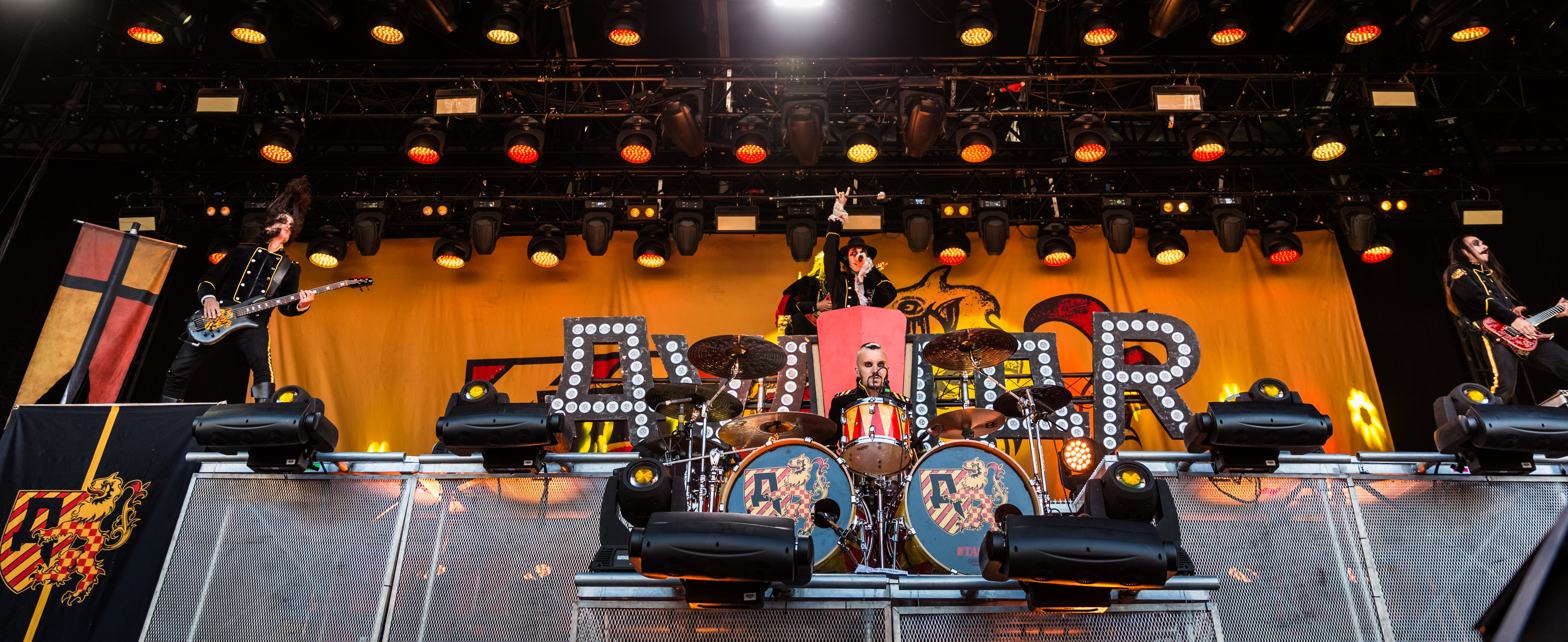
- Avatar at Rock am Ring 2018

Background information
- Origin: Mölndal, Sweden
- Genres: Melodic death metal; groove metal; alternative metal
- Years active: 2001–present
- Labels: Thirty Tigers / Black Waltz Records; eOne; Century Media
- Members: Jonas "Kungen" Jarlsby; John Alfredsson; Johannes Eckerström; Tim Öhrström; Henrik Sandelin
- Past members: Christian Rimmi; Daniel Johansson; Viktor Ekström; Kim Egerbo; Albin Dahlquist; Niklas Green; Björn Risberg; Simon Andersson
- Website: avatarmetal.com

Avatar is a Swedish heavy metal band, formed in Mölndal in 2001. The band has released ten studio albums, with the most recent, Don't Go in the Forest, released in late October 2025. The band has had some success on US rock radio, most recently with "The Dirt I'm Buried In" peaking at number 1 of the same chart in August 2023, making it the song with the longest journey to number 1 in the last 20 years.

== History ==
=== Formation and early releases (2001−2010) ===
Avatar was formed as Lost Soul in the summer of 2001 by drummer John Alfredsson and vocalist Christian Rimmi. They were joined by guitarists Viktor Ekström and Daniel Johansson, as well as bassist John Isacsson. However, Johansson was fired after not attending rehearsals, his replacement was current guitarist Jonas Jarlsby. After a name change to Avatar, the members decided to disband due to the lack of interest in playing heavy music. Some months later, Alfredsson and Jarlsby found guitarist Kim Egerbo, bassist Niklas Green and vocalist Johannes Eckerström, and decided to reform. With this line-up, the band performed their first concert on January 21, 2003, at the Folket's Hus in Mölndal, Sweden. Green left Avatar in February and was replaced by Björn Risberg in April. That month also saw Eckerström leave the band due to problems with his voice although he returned four months later. In July, Egerbo and Risberg left Avatar, but the latter returned as a guitarist in September, along with current bassist Henrik Sandelin. The last member change took place in October 2003, with Simon Andersson replacing Risberg, completing the band's first stable line-up. Avatar released two four-song EP demos in 2004: Personal Observations released on 18 January 2004, and 4 Reasons to Die on 19 November 2004. Avatar's first studio album, Thoughts of No Tomorrow, was released on 25 January 2006 and peaked at No. 47 on the Sweden Albums Top 60. The band completed several European tours as a supporting act for Impaled Nazarene, Evergrey, and In Flames.

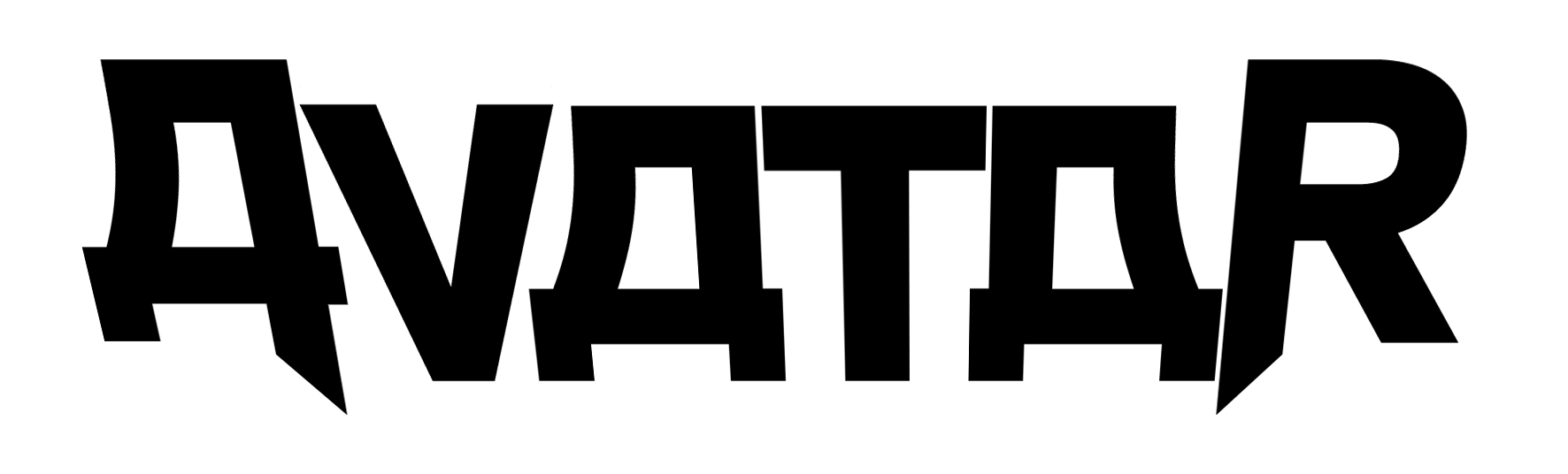
Avatar logo

Avatar's second album, Schlacht, was released on 24 October 2007, reaching spot 27 on the Swedish album chart. Björn Gelotte from In Flames contributed a guitar solo on the track "Letters from Neverend". The subsequent set of tours saw them perform at the 2008 Sweden Rock Festival as well as shows in support of Obituary (January–February 2008), and Hardcore Superstar (October–November 2009).

The band's third album, the self-titled Avatar, was released in Sweden in November 2009 and reached the 36th position on the national album chart. In January 2010 the music video for the song "Queen of Blades" was released on the band's website. Around that time, the band signed with Sony Music for the German and Swiss release of their latest album on 26 March 2010. In April of the same year a deal was signed with the Japanese label Art Union, for a 19 May launch of the album. They then launched into an ambitious touring schedule appearing at the 2010 Storsjöyran, and also with Warrior Soul (March–April 2010), Dark Tranquillity (October–November 2010), and Helloween (December 2010 – January 2011).

=== Black Waltz and Hail the Apocalypse (2011−2015) ===
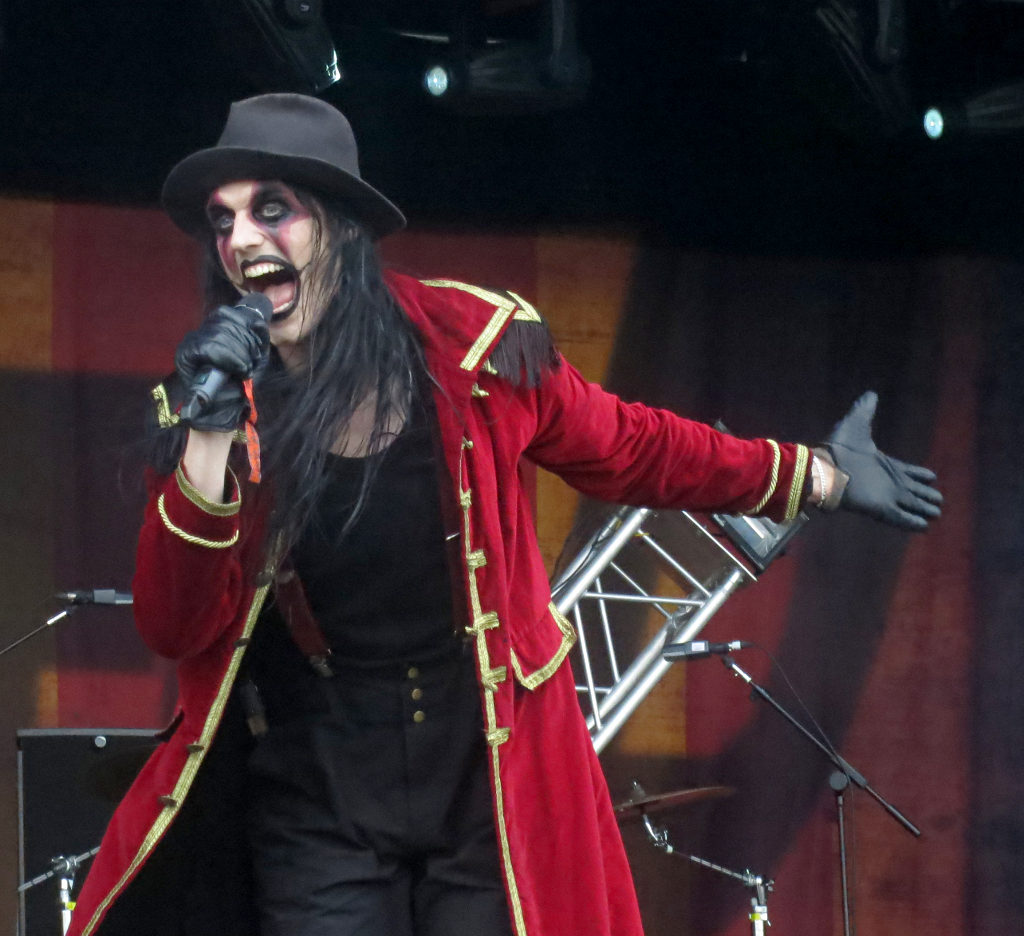
Vocalist Johannes Eckerström performing at Bloodstock Open Air 2014

On 25 January 2012, the album Black Waltz was released in Europe. It reached position 25 on the album list in Avatar's native Sweden. The album was released in the US on 14 February. Black Waltz marks the first appearance of the "Clown" face paint now worn regularly by Eckerström. It is also the band's last album to feature long-time guitarist Simon Andersson, who left the band in February 2012 to focus on his studies. To support the American release of Black Waltz, Avatar embarked on its first ever U.S. tour alongside Lacuna Coil and Sevendust in February 2013.

In August 2013, after the wife of Device and Disturbed vocalist David Draiman gave birth and Draiman opted to bow out of his tour schedule, Avatar was picked by Avenged Sevenfold to replace Device and continue to tour with them and Five Finger Death Punch. The following fall, the band spent a month in Thailand recording for a new album, planned for release in March 2014. On 11 March 2014, it was announced that Avatar's fifth album would be titled Hail the Apocalypse and was released 13 May 2014 via eOne Music. The album's first single, the title track, was released 17 March 2014 and was accompanied by a video. The new album is produced by Tobias Lindell and mixed by Jay Ruston. Since the release of Hail the Apocalypse, Avatar has conducted several tours of the U.S. and Europe as both a supporting and headline act, as well as performing at festivals such as Rock on the Range 2014 and the inaugural Louder Than Life. The music video for "Vultures Fly" premiered on 26 January 2015 and earned distinction by being voted No. 1 for five weeks in a row in Loudwire's Battle Royal video countdown, as well as their 2015 Best Rock Video. Avatar then began a U.S. tour in April 2015 consisting of headline performances, and supporting Five Finger Death Punch and Mushroomhead.

On 6 May 2015, it was announced that Avatar would be included in the lineup of Shiprocked 2016. Avatar returned to the U.S. for another headline tour in August–September 2015 with Gemini Syndrome and First Decree, and in January–February 2016 with September Mourning prior to returning to Sweden to complete writing on the follow-up to Hail the Apocalypse. Sylvia Massy was announced as producer of that album, which was then recorded in three studios across Europe. Towards the end of 2015, it was announced Avatar would be scheduled to appear at several festivals in 2016, to include Rock on the Range and Carolina Rebellion.

=== Feathers & Flesh (2016−2017) ===
After several tours supporting 2014's Hail the Apocalypse, Avatar entered the studio in December 2015 to begin recording a then unnamed follow-up studio album. The band split their time between three European studios — Castle Studios in Rohrsdorf, Germany, Finnvox Studios in Helsinki, Finland and Spinroad Studios in Lindome, Sweden. Acclaimed producer Sylvia Massy, noted for her work with Tool and Red Hot Chili Peppers, praised Avatar as "relentless," noting singer Johannes Eckerström as having "wild energy and charisma." The start of recording sessions also coincided with multiple updates via the band's Instagram account, chronicling their time in the studio. Once recording finished, Avatar took part in Shiprocked 2016, then toured the southern United States with September Mourning and Saint Diablo. On 30 January 2016, in Dallas, Texas, Avatar performed the song "For The Swarm" for the first time, the first original song since the release of their previous album.

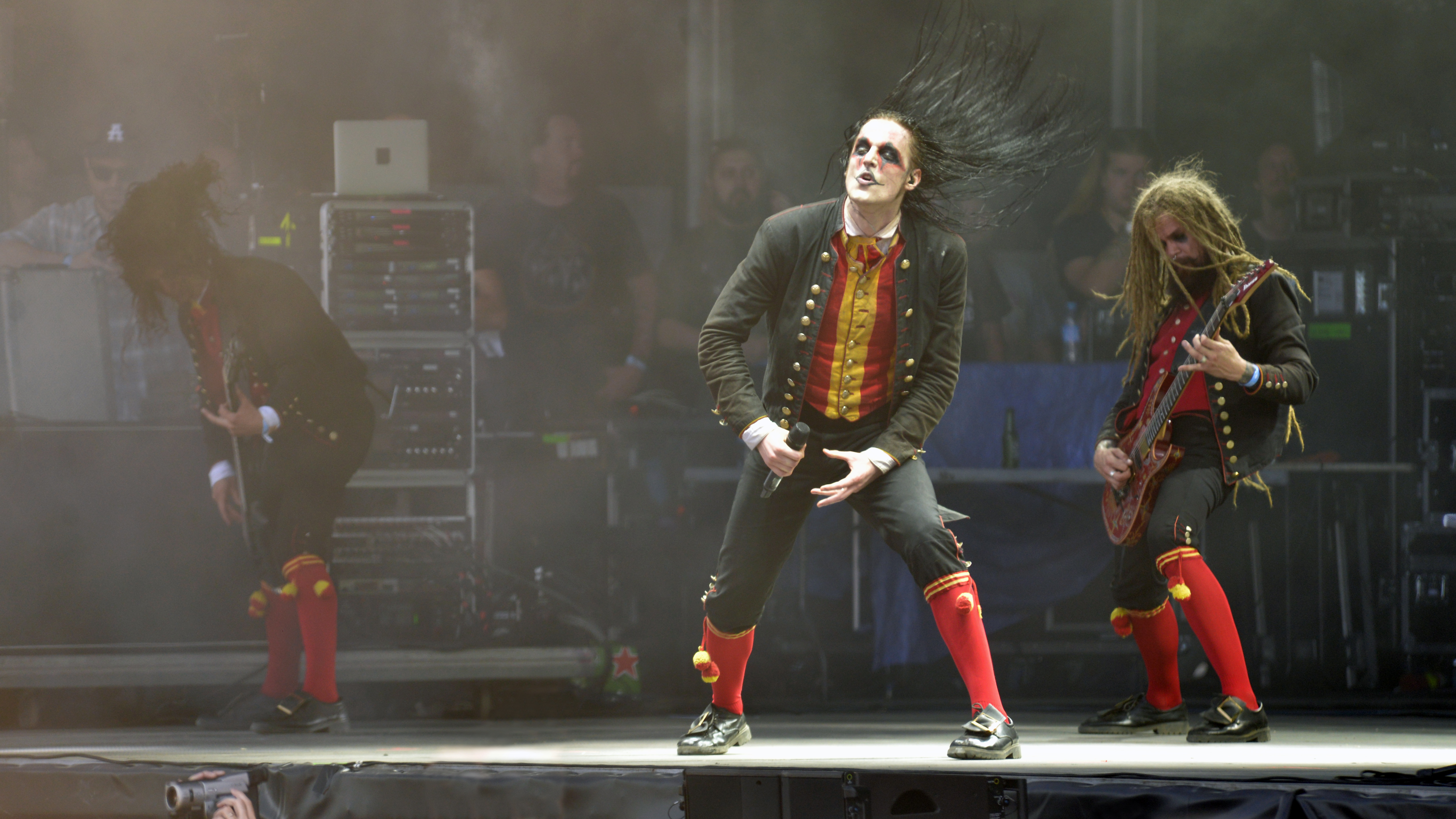
Avatar performing at Hellfest 2017

On 3 March 2016, Avatar revealed the name of the new album, Feathers & Flesh, via their official website, and through social media. A release date of 13 May 2016 was also announced, as well as several pre-ordering merchandise bundles that would be available to order on 17 March 2016. One bundle offers a 60-page, 109-verse poem hardcover book described on the band's Facebook as 'a story too extensive for any booklet'. The first single, "For the Swarm", was released as a reward for those pre-ordering the album on iTunes. A music video of this single was also released. Fan reception of the new song and video were high, as evidenced in "For the Swarm" being voted No. 1 in Loudwire's Battle Royale for the week ending 11 March 2016. On 17 March 2016, the singles, "Regret" and "House of Eternal Hunt" were released to help kick off pre-ordering of merchandise bundles for Feathers & Flesh. A video directed by Johan Carlén was released featuring the two songs playing sequentially as the view pans around a darkened art gallery, with many paintings of birds, primarily owls, mirroring some of the artwork that the band has created for the individual songs on their album. "Regret", as the opening track on the album, is described by the band as "an intense journey through epicness" and, "...by far the most different album-intro we ever written." The song introduces The Owl, the protagonist of the album as she lays dying, reflecting on her past. "House of Eternal Hunt", described by the band as "the definition of metal," starts the tale of The Owl, a "predator ruling the sky" according to Eckerström. The first official single, "The Eagle Has Landed", was released 25 March 2016. As with the previously released singles, this track was an instant gratification reward for pre-ordering Feathers & Flesh. The song introduces The Eagle, "...crashing into the world of his adversary," according to Eckerström. While no new music video was released with this track, the band uploaded the song to its official YouTube channel with the same video featured for the release of "Regret" and "House of Eternal Hunt". Through March and April 2017, the band toured North America with In This Moment, Motionless in White & Gemini Syndrome as a part of In This Moment's Half God Half Devil Tour.

On 12 June 2017, Avatar were awarded the Breakthrough Band Award at the Metal Hammer Golden Gods.

=== Avatar Country (2017−2020) ===
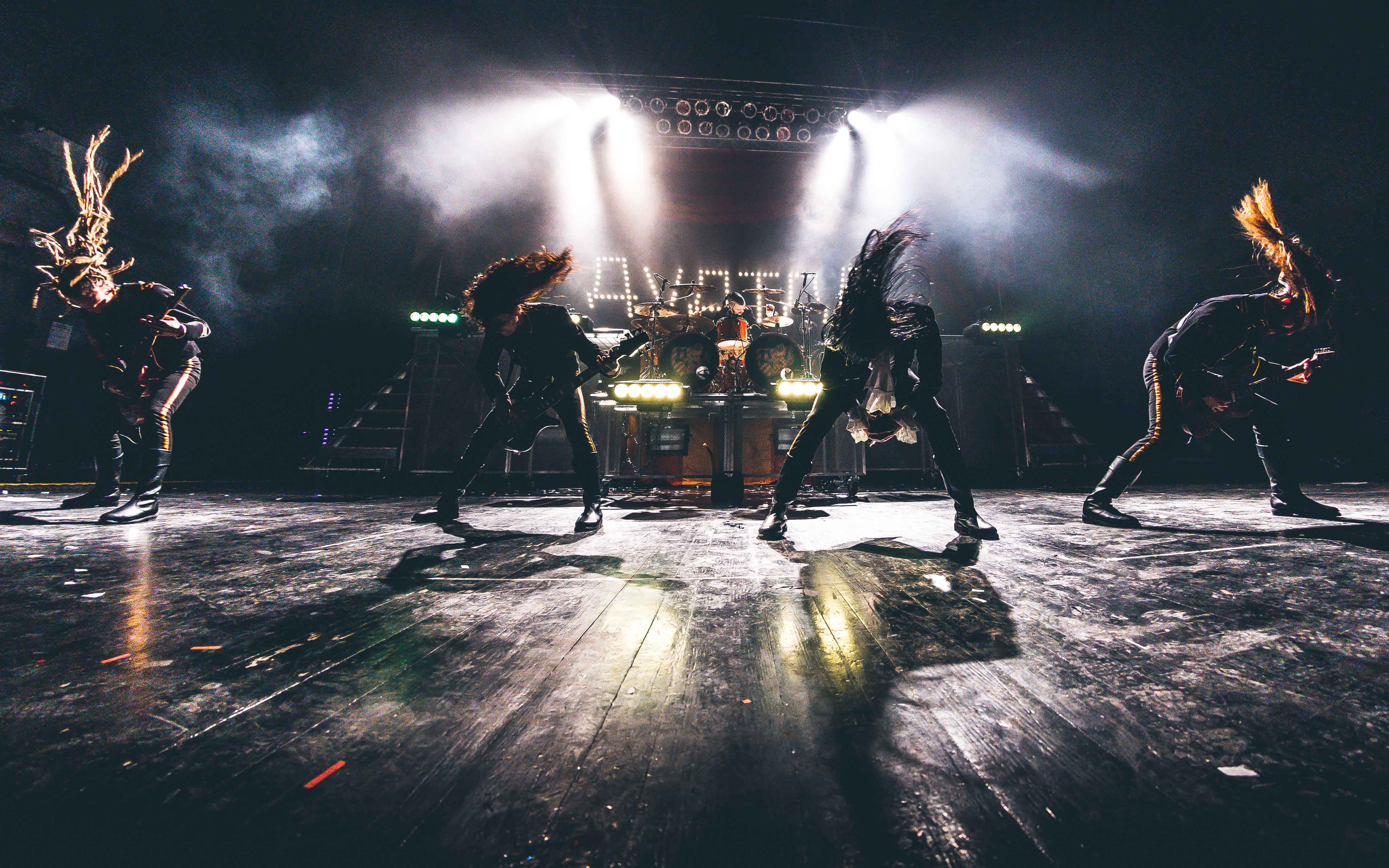
Avatar Country World Tour kick-off show in Columbus, Ohio on 6 January 2018

On 24 October 2017, Avatar released a new single called "A Statue of the King", along with the announcement that they will release their seventh album, Avatar Country, on 12 January 2018. It was also announced the dates of the new Avatar tour, called Avatar Country Tour, which starts in January 2018 in North America and arrives in Europe in March of the same year. On 13 December, the song "The King Wants You" was released on SiriusXM Octane radio, and soon available on digital platforms, being the second single from the album Avatar Country. The official music video was released on 19 December.

On 12 January 2018, Avatar Country was released worldwide, available both through streaming services such as Spotify, and in physical formats from music stores throughout the world. On 29 October 2018, the band launched a Kickstarter campaign for Legend of Avatar Country which has been described as "a film featurette based on the album Avatar Country by the band Avatar." The band needed to meet funding of $50,000 and as of 31 October 2018, the band had raised over $110,000 for the film. By the end of the 20-day campaign, over $188,000 had been pledged.

=== Hunter Gatherer and Dance Devil Dance (2020−2023) ===
In early December 2019, Avatar announced that they had begun recording their next album at Sphere Studios in Los Angeles. An interview with Loudwire in January and later a paywalled video by the band itself revealed that Slipknot and Stone Sour frontman Corey Taylor has a cameo in the song "Secret Door". The same interview also revealed the names of a few other songs on the yet unnamed album: "Colossus", "Child", "Scream Into the Void", and "Silence in the Age of Apes". Speaking of the tone of the album, Johannes Eckerström told Loudwire:

"Avatar Country, we wanted to see if we could do comedy ... It was funny and we wanted to see if we could make something funny ... But it was humorous for us, and now it's important for us to do something devoid of humor, there is no joking around with this and it pulls us back into reality. It deals more with darkness, sadness, detachment, alienation and the anxiety of thinking of the world at large."

In a YouTube video and a tweet on 1 May 2020, the band announced the end of the "Avatar Country" era and teased the upcoming album with the question "Will you hunt with us?".

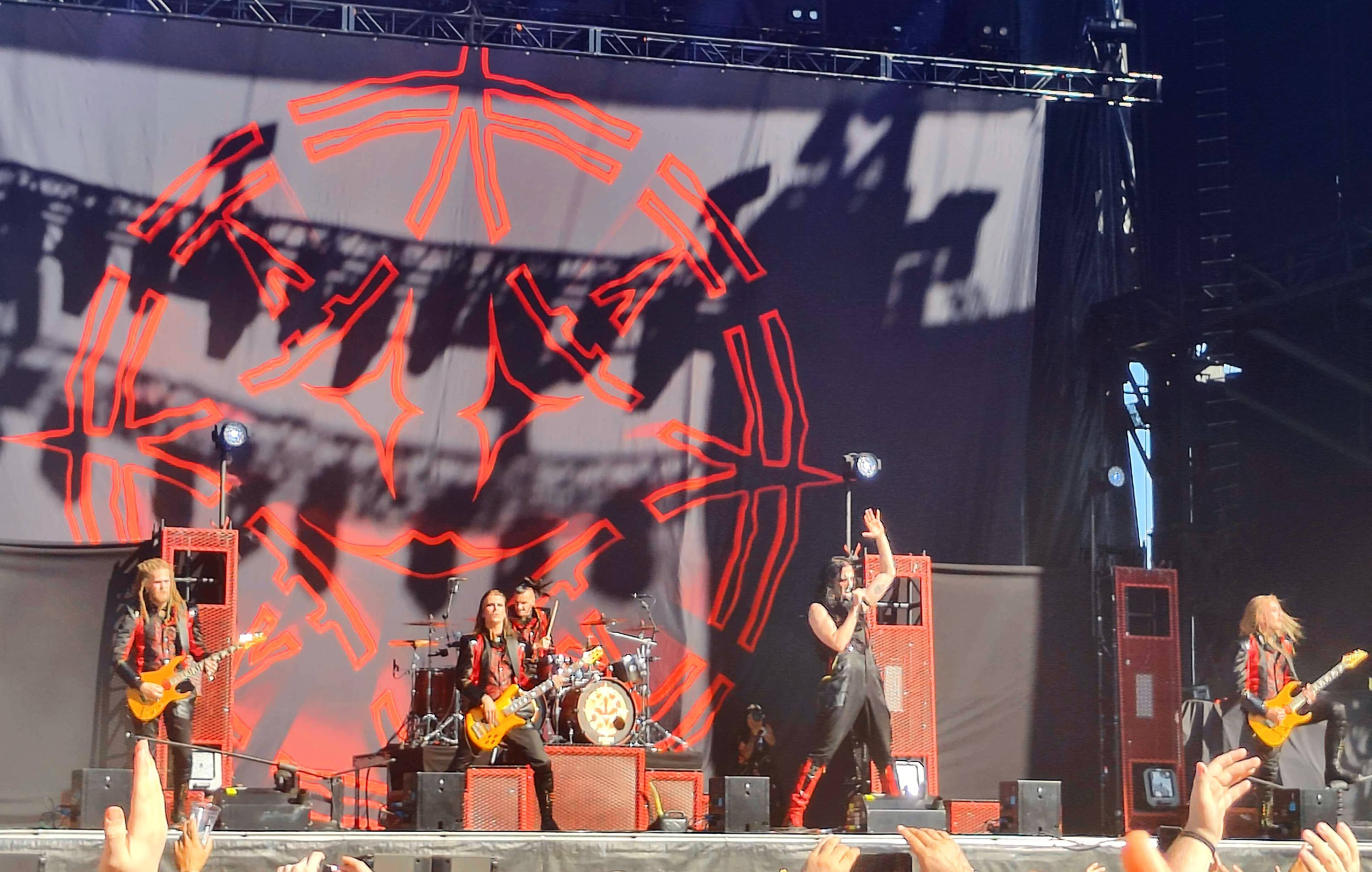
Avatar playing at Aftershock 2023.

The name Hunter Gatherer and the release date of 7 August 2020 were announced through another video on 5 May 2020. The music video for "Silence in the Age of Apes" was released on 14 May 2020 and was released on streaming platforms the following day. Two singles entitled "Going Hunting" and "Barren Cloth Mother" were released on 31 August and 1 September 2021, respectively, ahead of the band's Going Hunting Tour. At the same time, the band announced their split with their record label eOne and the inception of their own label, Black Waltz Records. "Going Hunting" was elected by Loudwire as the 34th best metal song of 2021.

By June 2022, Avatar had been working on new material for their ninth studio album, Dance Devil Dance, released on 17 February 2023. Five non-album singles were released ahead of the album's release. On 14 July 2022, the band played their 1000th show, at the Cadot Rock Fest. In September 2023, the band achieved their first Billboard Mainstream Rock no. 1 single with "The Dirt I'm Buried In". Also in 2023, the Cretaceous brittle star Ophiocoma avatar was named after the band.

=== Don't Go in the Forest (2024–present) ===
In April 2024, Eckerström confirmed that Avatar has been writing new material for their tenth studio album, which they were planning to release around the second half of 2025. In December 2024, amidst a legal battle with their former record label, Avatar released a 7" single of "Tower", consisting of a piano version on the A-side and a live version on the B-side.

The album, titled Don't Go in the Forest, released 31 October 2025, following the release of four stylistically distinct singles. In an interview with Loudwire, Eckerström, expressing satisfaction and pride regarding the album, said of the release:

"[It] sounds weird, but it's like with Dance Devil Dance ... Because I was pleased with it, here comes the letting go part and that's, 'Okay, I'm bored. Next.' I imagine if I would have felt that we failed to some degree in achieving what we set out to do, I don't think I would get to be bored with it. [...] I feel like, once again, with this album, we achieved something."

The album was met with generally positive reviews, with Kerrang! giving it a 4/5 rating, calling it "raucous" and saying that there are "enough good tunes to power Avatar’s luminous live shows" and Louder Sound giving it four stars out of five and praising its catchy nature, saying "For all its stylistic detours, what’s striking is how unashamedly hook-driven this record is." The band is set to tour across Europe and the US over the course of 2026. The band also made an appearance at Welcome to Rockville, which took place in Daytona Beach, Florida in May 2026. They have also opened for Metallica for some of their European M72 Stadium tour in 2026. They will be returning to open for them in 2027 for a North American run of the M72 Stadium tour.

== Musical style and influences ==
Avatar has been described as melodic death metal, alternative metal and groove metal. AllMusic described them as a "groove-oriented, melodic death metal outfit".

Avatar was shaped primarily by the melodic death metal of In Flames and the Haunted, with additional musical influences coming from the industrial machine style of Rammstein, Marilyn Manson and Ministry. Avatar's earliest influences include Beethoven, the Beatles, Iron Maiden and Black Sabbath. They took style cues from Helloween, Strapping Young Lad, Devin Townsend, Thin Lizzy, Meshuggah, Gojira, and Cryptopsy.

== Band members ==
Avatar at Rockharz 2026

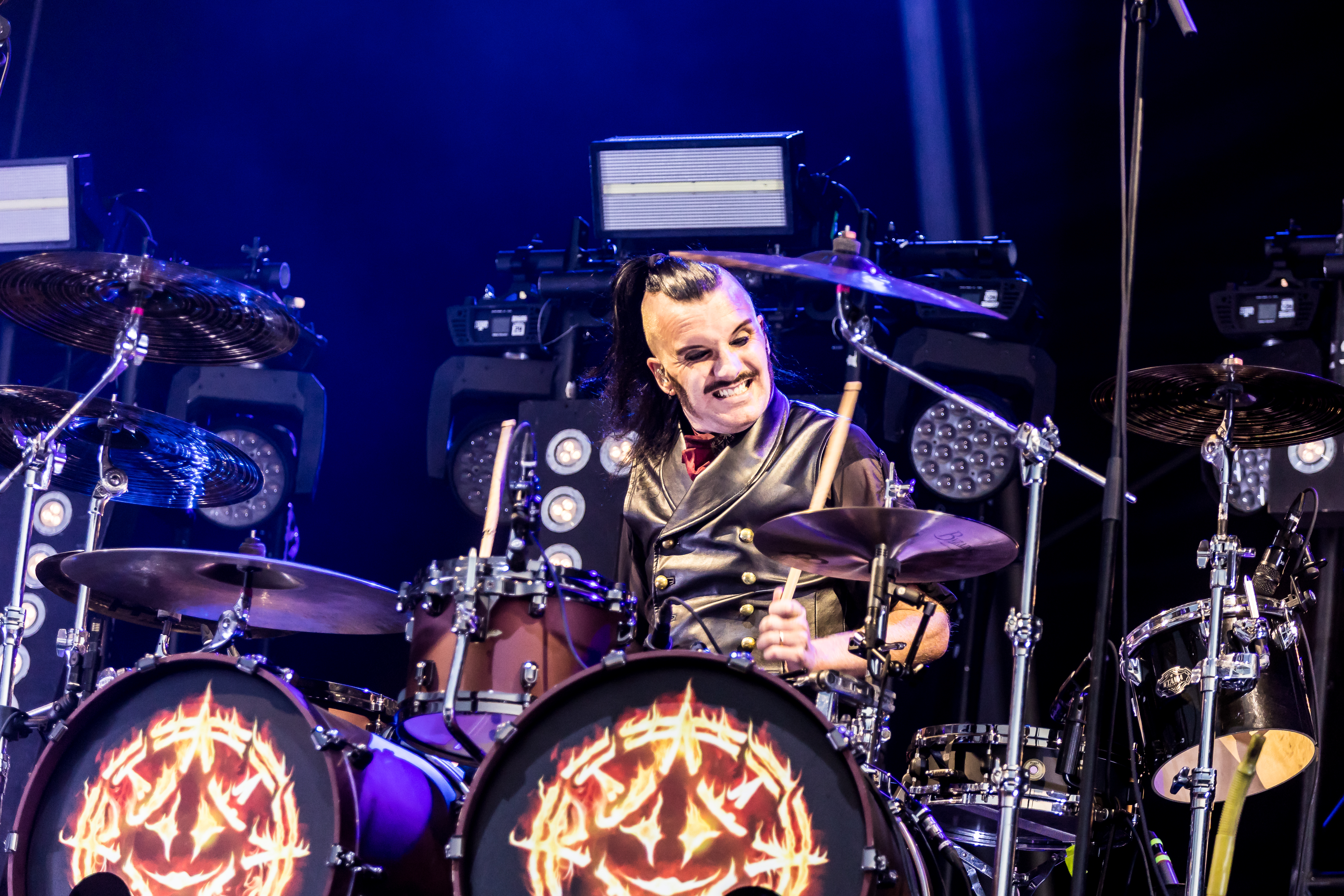
John Alfredsson, drums

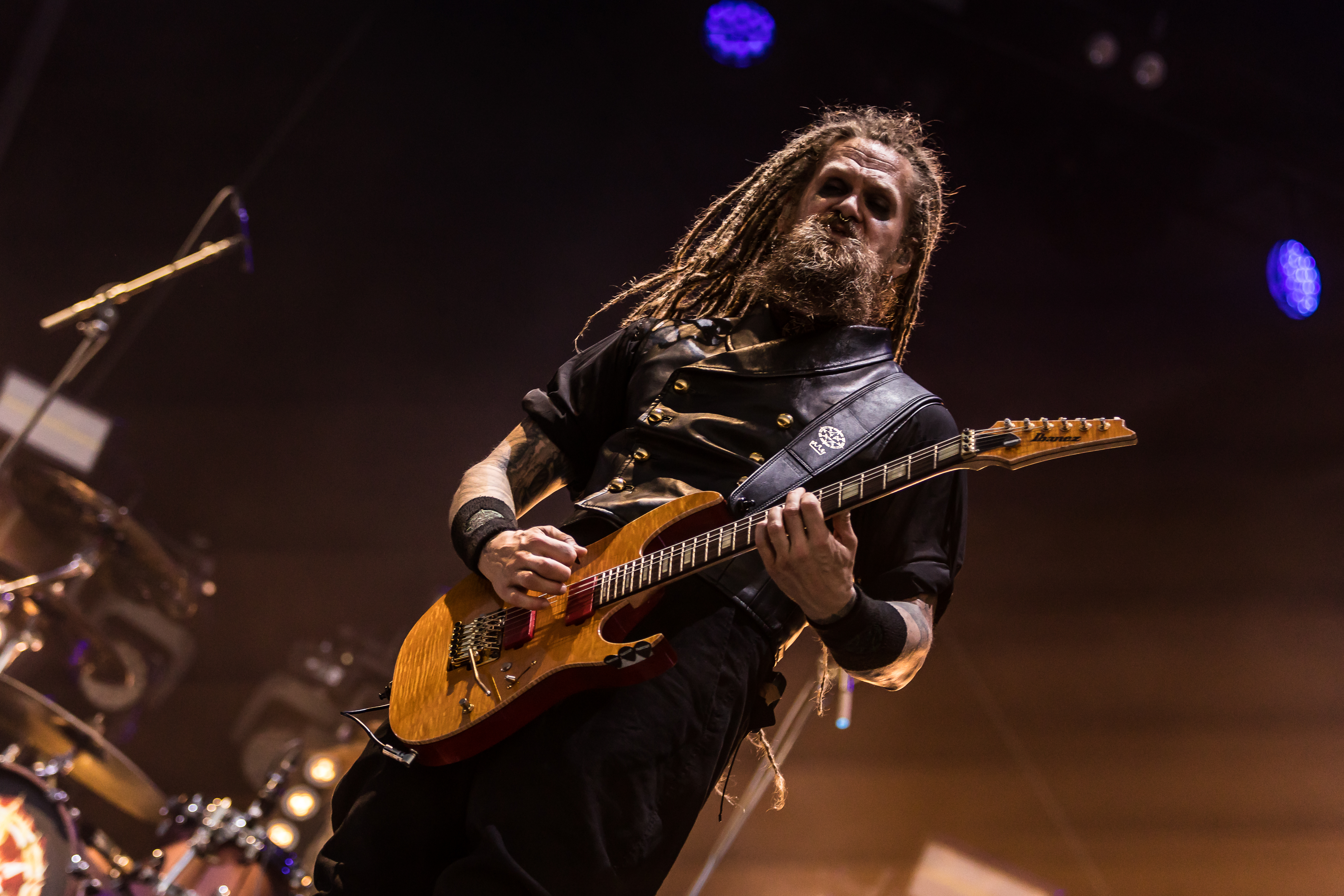
Jonas Jarlsby, guitars

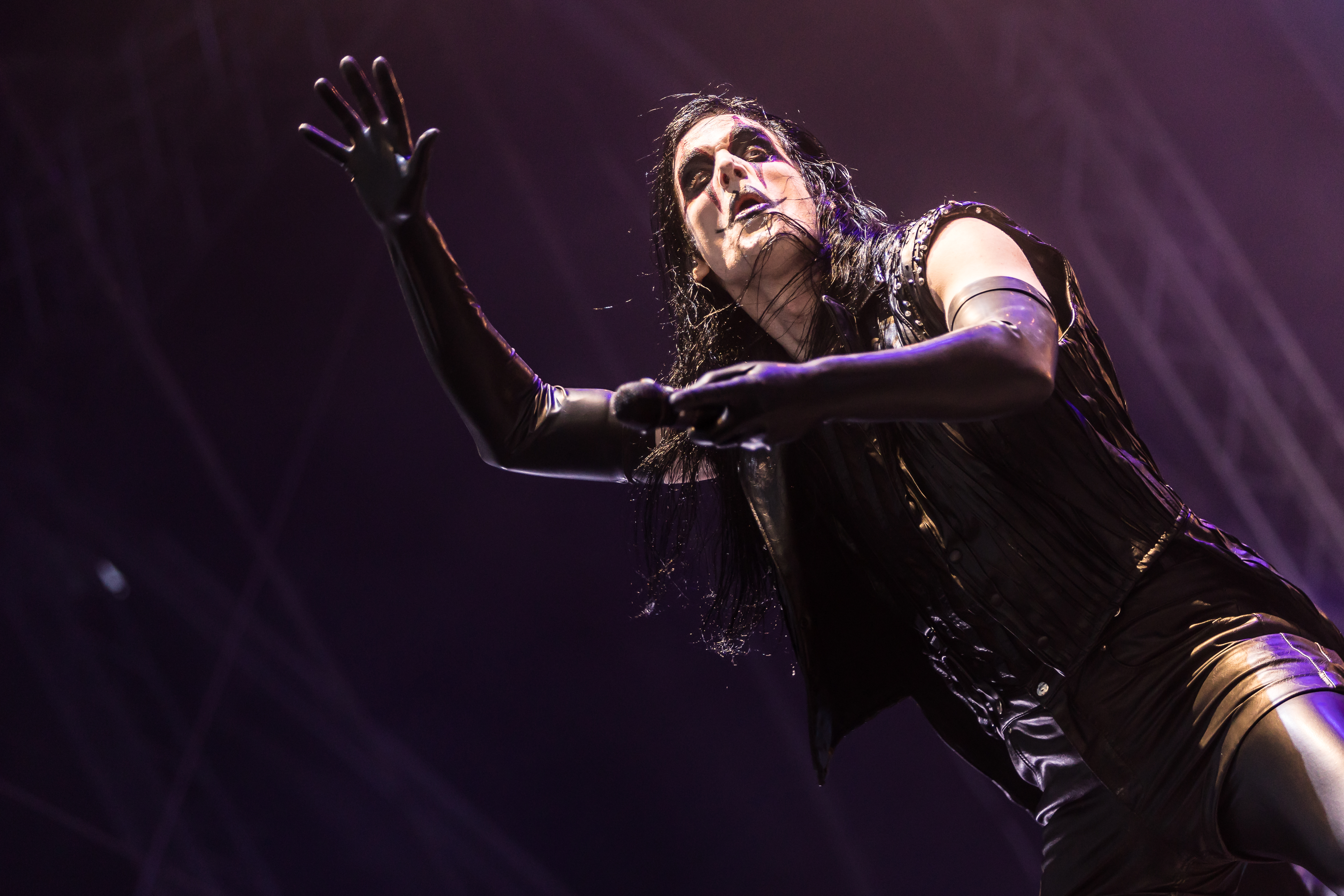
Johannes Eckerström, vocals

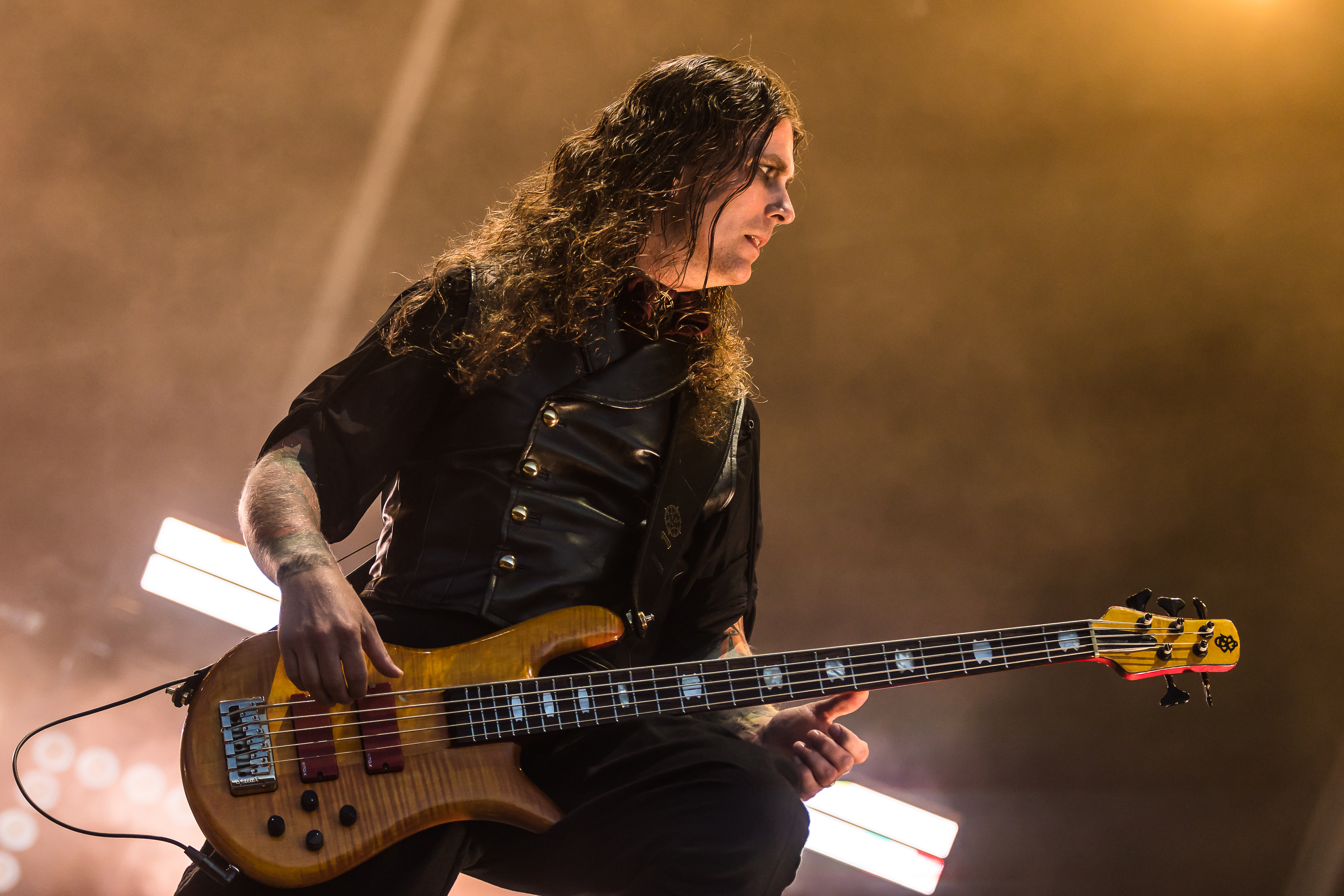
Henrik Sandelin, bass

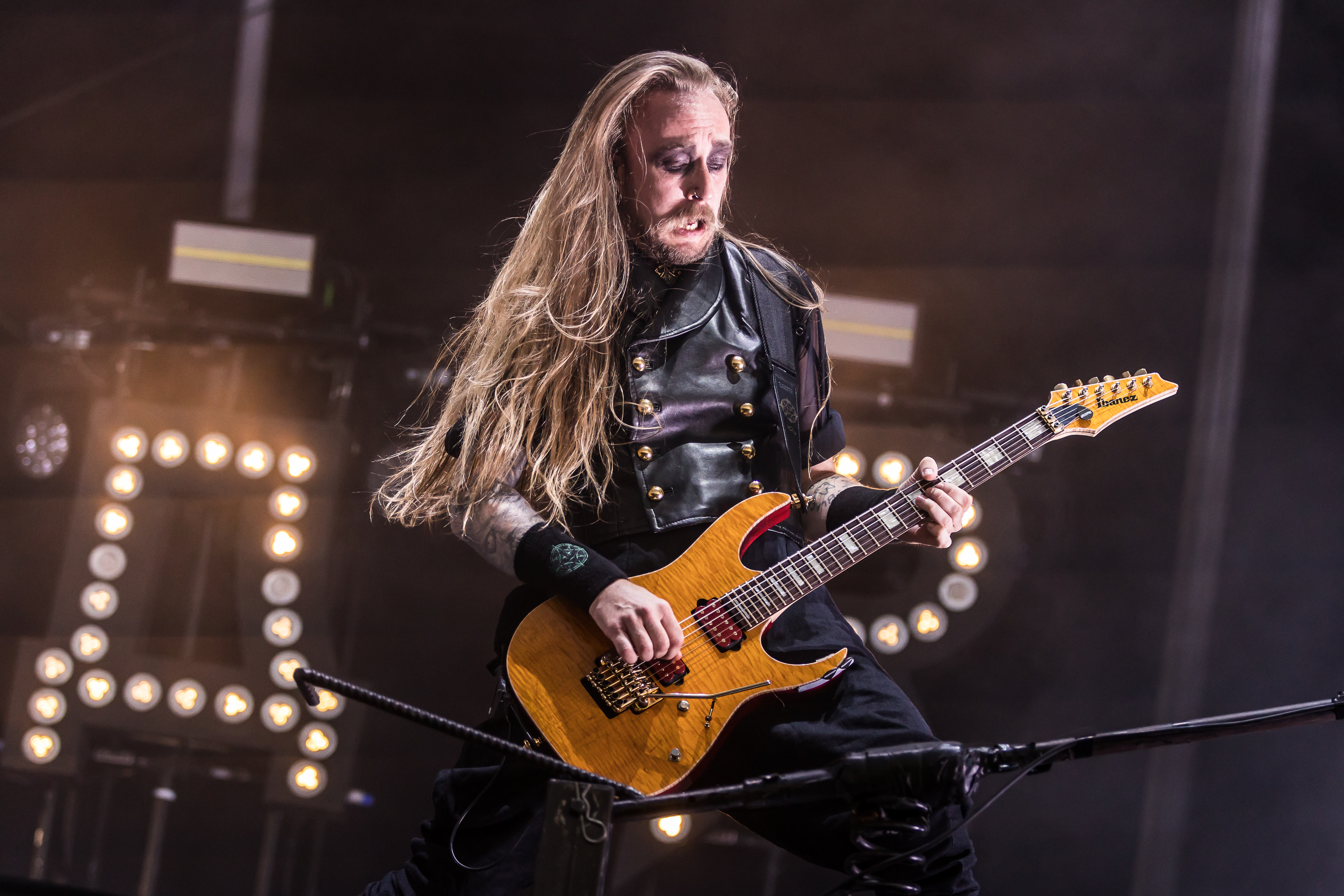
Tim Öhrström, guitars

Current

- John Alfredsson – drums (2001–present)
- Jonas "Kungen" Jarlsby – guitars (2001–present)
- Johannes Eckerström – lead vocals (2002–present), brass (2014–present), piano, keyboards (2021–present)
- Henrik Sandelin – bass, backing vocals (2003–present)
- Tim Öhrström – guitars, backing vocals (2011–present)

Former

- Christian Rimmi – vocals (2001)
- Daniel Johansson – guitars (2001)
- Viktor Ekström – guitars (2001)
- John Isacsson – bass (2001)
- Albin Dahlquist – bass (2001–2002)
- Kim Egerbo – guitars (2002–2003)
- Niklas Green – bass (2002–2003)
- Björn Risberg – bass (2003), guitars (2003)
- Simon Andersson – guitars (2003–2012)

Timeline

== Discography ==
=== Studio albums ===
| Title | Album details | Peak chart positions | | | | | | | | | | | Sales |
| Title | Album details | SWE | US | US Ind. | AUT | BEL | FRA | GER | SWI | SCO | UK Sales | UK Rock | Sales |
|---|---|---|---|---|---|---|---|---|---|---|---|---|---|
| Thoughts of No Tomorrow | Released: 25 January 2006; Label: Gain Music Entertainment; Formats: CD, CS, LP, DL | 47 | — | — | — | — | — | — | — | — | — | — | — |
| Schlacht | Released: 24 October 2007; Label: Gain; Formats: CD, CS, LP, DL | 27 | — | — | — | — | — | — | — | — | — | — | — |
| Avatar | Released: 20 November 2009; Label: Gain; Formats: CD, CS, LP, DL | 36 | — | — | — | — | — | — | — | — | — | — | — |
| Black Waltz | Released: 25 January 2012; Label: Gain; Formats: CD, CS, LP, DL | 25 | — | — | — | — | — | — | — | — | — | — | — |
| Hail the Apocalypse | Released: 13 May 2014; Label: Entertainment One; Formats: CD, CS, LP, DL | — | 97 | 18 | — | — | — | — | — | — | — | — | — |
| Feathers & Flesh | Released: 13 May 2016; Label: eOne; Formats: CD, CS, LP, DL | — | 88 | 7 | — | 135 | — | — | — | — | — | 26 | — |
| Avatar Country | Released: 12 January 2018; Label: eOne, Century Media; Formats: CD, CS, LP, DL | — | 132 | 2 | — | 90 | 181 | — | 87 | — | — | 11 | — |
| Hunter Gatherer | Released: 7 August 2020; Label: eOne; Formats: CD, CS, LP, DL | — | — | 44 | 70 | 51 | 101 | 79 | — | 97 | 55 | 4 | — |
| Dance Devil Dance | Released: 17 February 2023; Label: Thirty Tigers; Formats: CD, CS, LP, DL | — | — | — | — | — | 117 | 66 | 100 | 44 | 23 | 7 | * US: 19,000 |
| Don't Go in the Forest | Released: 31 October 2025; Label: Thirty TIgers; Formats: CD, CS, LP, DL | — | — | — | — | — | — (Note: Don't Go in the Forest did not enter the official Top French Albums chart, but peaked at number 80 on the Top French Physical Albums chart.) | — | — | 93 | 76 | 11 | — |

=== Live albums ===
| Title | Album details |
|---|---|
| The King Live in Paris | Released: 17 May 2019; Recorded at Download Festival 2018 (Paris) |

=== Extended plays ===
| Title | EP details |
|---|---|
| 4 Reasons to Die | Released: 19 November 2004; Label: Bloodstained Art |
| Black Waltz | Released: 24 October 2011; Label: Gain Music |
| Whisper the Unspeakable Collection | Released: 2 February 2024; Label: Black Waltz |
| Going Hunting | Released: 1 March 2024; Label: Black Waltz |

=== Demo ===
| Title | Demo details |
|---|---|
| Personal Observations | Released: 18 January 2004 |

=== Singles ===
| Year | Song | Peak chart positions | | | | | | | Album |
| Year | Song | US Main. | US Rock Air. | CAN Rock | CZE Rock | SWE | FIN | GER Rock | Album |
|---|---|---|---|---|---|---|---|---|---|
| 2005 | "And I Bid You Farewell" | — | — | — | — | — | — | — | Thoughts of No Tomorrow |
| 2005 | "My Shining Star" | — | — | — | — | — | — | — | Thoughts of No Tomorrow |
| 2009 | "The Great Pretender" | — | — | — | — | — | — | — | Avatar |
| 2012 | "Let It Burn" | — | — | — | — | — | — | — | Black Waltz |
| 2012 | "Smells Like a Freakshow" | 32 | — | — | — | — | — | — | Black Waltz |
| 2014 | "Hail the Apocalypse" | — | — | — | — | — | — | — | Hail the Apocalypse |
| 2014 | "Bloody Angel" | 25 | — | — | — | — | — | — | Hail the Apocalypse |
| 2014 | "Vultures Fly" | — | — | — | — | — | — | — | Hail the Apocalypse |
| 2016 | "The Eagle Has Landed" | 16 | 48 | — | — | — | — | — | Feathers & Flesh |
| 2016 | "Night Never Ending" | 31 | — | — | — | — | — | — | Feathers & Flesh |
| 2017 | "New Land" | 20 | — | — | — | — | — | — | Feathers & Flesh |
| 2017 | "A Statue of the King" | — | — | — | — | 19 | — | — | Avatar Country |
| 2017 | "The King Wants You" | 27 | — | — | 5 | 29 | — | — | Avatar Country |
| 2018 | "The King Welcomes You to Avatar Country" | — | — | — | — | 32 | — | — | Avatar Country |
| 2020 | "Silence in the Age of Apes" | — | — | — | — | 10 | — | — | Hunter Gatherer |
| 2020 | "God of Sick Dreams" | — | — | — | — | 51 | — | — | Hunter Gatherer |
| 2020 | "Colossus" | 16 | — | — | — | 20 | — | — | Hunter Gatherer |
| 2021 | "Going Hunting" | 36 | — | — | — | 50 | — | — | Going Hunting |
| 2021 | "Barren Cloth Mother" | — | — | — | — | 154 | — | — | Going Hunting |
| 2021 | "So Sang the Hollow" | — | — | — | — | 178 | — | — | Going Hunting |
| 2021 | "Construction of Souls" | — | — | — | — | 175 | — | — | Going Hunting |
| 2021 | "Cruel and Unusual" | — | — | — | — | 86 | — | — | Going Hunting |
| 2022 | "Valley of Disease" | — | — | — | — | 82 | — | — | Dance Devil Dance |
| 2022 | "Dance Devil Dance" | — | — | — | — | 132 | — | — | Dance Devil Dance |
| 2023 | "The Dirt I'm Buried In" | 1 | 9 | 34 | 2 | 23 | 74 | 21 | Dance Devil Dance |
| 2023 | "Violence No Matter What" (duet with Lzzy Hale) | — | — | — | — | 36 | — | — | Dance Devil Dance |
| 2024 | "Make It Rain" | — | — | — | — | — | — | — | Whisper the Unspeakable Collection |
| 2024 | "On The Other Side of Tonight" | — | — | — | — | — | — | — | Whisper the Unspeakable Collection |
| 2024 | "Tower" | — | — | — | — | — | — | — | Hail the Apocalypse |
| 2025 | "Captain Goat" | 25 | — | — | — | 51 | — | — | Don't Go in the Forest |
| 2025 | "In the Airwaves" | — | — | — | — | — | — | — | Don't Go in the Forest |
| 2025 | "Tonight We Must Be Warriors" | 4 | 32 | — | — | — | — | — | Don't Go in the Forest |
| 2025 | "Death and Glitz" | — | — | — | 4 | 75 | — | — | Don't Go in the Forest |
| 2026 | "Crying Fire" | 8 | 34 | — | — | — | — | — | Non-album single |
| 2026 | "Naughty List" (featuring Zakk Wylde) | — | — | — | — | — | — | — | Non-album single |
"—" denotes a recording that did not chart or was not released in that territory.

== Music videos ==
| Year | Title | Director | Album | Ref. |
|---|---|---|---|---|
| 2004 | "My Shining Star" | Jonas Wolcher | 4 Reasons to Die | |
| 2007 | "Schlacht" | – | Schlacht | |
| 2009 | "The Great Pretender" | PA Nilsson | Avatar | |
| 2010 | "Queen of Blades" | René U. Valdes | Avatar | |
| 2011 | "Black Waltz" | Johan Carlén | Black Waltz | |
| 2012 | "Let It Burn" | – | Black Waltz | |
| 2012 | "Torn Apart" | Johan Carlén | Black Waltz | |
| 2013 | "Smells Like a Freakshow" | Johan Carlén | Black Waltz | |
| 2014 | "Hail the Apocalypse" | Johan Carlén | Hail the Apocalypse | |
| 2014 | "Bloody Angel" | Johan Carlén | Hail the Apocalypse | |
| 2015 | "Vultures Fly" | Axel Widén | Hail the Apocalypse | |
| 2016 | "For the Swarm" | Johan Carlén | Feathers & Flesh | |
| 2016 | "The Eagle Has Landed" | Johan Carlén | Feathers & Flesh | |
| 2016 | "Night Never Ending" | Johan Carlén | Feathers & Flesh | |
| 2017 | "New Land" | Johan Carlén | Feathers & Flesh | |
| 2017 | "A Statue of the King" | Johan Carlén | Avatar Country | |
| 2017 | "The King Wants You" | Johan Carlén | Avatar Country | |
| 2018 | "The King Welcomes You to Avatar Country" | Johan Carlén | Avatar Country | |
| 2019 | "King's Harvest" | Johan Carlén | Avatar Country | |
| 2020 | "Silence in the Age of Apes" | Johan Carlén | Hunter Gatherer | |
| 2020 | "Colossus" | Johan Carlén | Hunter Gatherer | |
| 2020 | "A Secret Door" | Johan Carlén | Hunter Gatherer | |
| 2021 | "Going Hunting" | Johan Carlén | Going Hunting | |
| 2022 | "Dance Devil Dance" | Johan Carlén | Dance Devil Dance | |
| 2022 | "The Dirt I'm Buried In" | Johan Carlén | Dance Devil Dance | |
| 2023 | "Chimp Mosh Pit" | Johan Carlén | Dance Devil Dance | |
| 2024 | "Tower (Piano Version)" | Peter Junge & Andrea Cichecki | —N/a | |
| 2025 | "Captain Goat" | Johan Carlén | Don't Go in the Forest | |
| 2025 | "In the Airwaves" | Johan Carlén | Don't Go in the Forest | |
| 2025 | "Tonight We Must Be Warriors" | Johan Carlén | Don't Go in the Forest | |
| 2025 | "Don't Go In the Forest" | Johan Carlén | Don't Go in the Forest | |
| 2026 | "Crying Fire" | Johan Carlén | Non-album single | |

== Filmography ==
| Year | Title | Director | Type | Ref. |
|---|---|---|---|---|
| 2007 | Irene Huss - Tatuerad torso | Martin Asphaug | Film | |
| 2019 | With Horns in the Air – A Very Special Message from Avatar | Johan Carlén | Documentary | |
| 2019 | Legend of Avatar Country | Johan Carlén | Short film | |

== Awards and nominations ==
| Year | Award | Category | Nominated work | Result | Ref. |
|---|---|---|---|---|---|
| 2015 | Loudwire Music Awards | Best Rock Video | "Vultures Fly" | Won | |
| 2016 | Metal Hammer Golden Gods Awards | Breakthrough Band | Avatar | Nominated | |
| 2016 | The Epiphone Revolver Music Awards | Best New Talent | Avatar | Won | |
| 2017 | Metal Hammer Golden Gods Awards | Breakthrough Band | Avatar | Won | |
| 2017 | Alternative Press Music Awards | Breakthrough Band | Avatar | Nominated | |
