= Hail the Apocalypse =

Studio album by Avatar
- Released: 13 May 2014
- Recorded: Karma Sound Studios, Bang Saray, Thailand
- Genre: Alternative metal; groove metal; melodic death metal
- Length: 50:52
- Label: Entertainment One
- Producer: Tobias Lindell

Avatar chronology
Black Waltz (2012)	Hail the Apocalypse (2014)	Feathers & Flesh (2016)

Singles from Hail the Apocalypse
- 1. "Hail the Apocalypse" Released: 17 March 2014; 2. "Bloody Angel" Released: 8 April 2014; 3. "Vultures Fly" Released: 17 November 2014; 4. "Tower" Released: 12 December 2024

Professional ratings
Review scores
Source	Rating
Revolver	4/5 stars

Hail the Apocalypse is the fifth studio album by Swedish metal band Avatar, released on 13 May 2014. It is their first album to chart on the US Billboard 200, reaching number 97 and selling 3,500 copies in its first week. The album was mixed by Jay Ruston and mastered by Paul Logus.

In December 2024, amidst a legal battle with their former record label, Avatar released a 7" single of "Tower", consisting of a piano version on the A-side and a live version on the B-side.

== Track listing ==
No.	Title	Length
1.	"Hail the Apocalypse"	4:13
2.	"What I Don't Know"	4:53
3.	"Death of Sound"	4:21
4.	"Vultures Fly"	4:38
5.	"Bloody Angel"	6:04
6.	"Murderer"	5:03
7.	"Tsar Bomba"	3:33
8.	"Puppet Show"	4:23
9.	"Get in Line"	3:13
10.	"Something in the Way" (Nirvana cover)	4:27
11.	"Tower"	6:04
12.	"Use and Abuse" (featuring DJ Starscream)	3:26
Total length:		54:18

== Personnel ==
=== Avatar ===
- Johannes Eckerström – lead vocals
- Jonas "Kungen" Jarlsby – guitar
- Tim Öhrström – guitar, backing vocals
- Henrik Sandelin – bass, backing vocals
- John Alfredsson – drums

== Charts ==
Chart	Peak position
US Billboard 200	97
US Top Hard Rock Albums (Billboard)	6
US Top Rock Albums (Billboard)	25
US Independent Albums (Billboard)	18
