= The Dirt I'm Buried In =

2022 song by Avatar

Single by Avatar

from the album Dance Devil Dance
- Released: December 8, 2022
- Length: 4:04
- Label: Black Waltz; Thirty Tigers
- Songwriters: John Alfredsson; Jonas Jarlsby; Johannes Eckerström; Henrik Sandelin; Tim Öhrström
- Producers: Jay Ruston; Avatar

Avatar singles chronology
"Dance Devil Dance" (2022)	"The Dirt I'm Buried In" (2022)	"Violence No Matter What" (2023)

The Dirt I'm Buried In (Live in Paris) single artwork

Music video
- "The Dirt I'm Buried In" on YouTube

"The Dirt I'm Buried In" is a single by Swedish heavy metal band Avatar from their ninth studio album, Dance Devil Dance. It peaked at No. 1 on the US Billboard Mainstream Rock Airplay chart in 2023.

== Release ==
"The Dirt I'm Buried In" was released on December 8, 2022, as a single from Dance Devil Dance, and was issued digitally on December 9, 2022. The song was released to rock radio on January 24, 2023. Avatar released a "Live in Paris" version as a digital single on May 26, 2023. In February 2024, the band announced a 7-inch vinyl single featuring "The Dirt I'm Buried In (Live in Paris)" as a bonus track.

== Music and composition ==
Rich Hobson of Metal Hammer described "The Dirt I'm Buried In" as being built around a "funky beat" and an "oh-so-singable chorus". Graham Ray of Distorted Sound described the track as having an "80s pop swing" and called it "well-written" and "infectiously groovy". He also noted a rock solo before the final chorus. Anne Erickson of Blabbermouth.net described the song as featuring 1980s electronic beats and catchy vocals.

== Reception ==
Ray called it "easily one of their most catchy tracks to date" and "a perfect choice for a single", while Erickson described it as a "no-brainer single" for Avatar.

== Music video ==
The music video was released on December 8, 2022. Revolver described the video as horror-comedy-themed and noted that it features heavy-metal werewolves and other mythical beasts. Metal Injection described the video as featuring what appeared to be a vaudeville show and "marsupial-like aliens". Hobson praised the video's "Universal Horror-inspired collection of horror figures".

== Track listing ==
All tracks are written by John Alfredsson, Jonas Peter Jarlsby, Johannes Eckerström, Henrik Sandelin, and Tim Öhrström.

"The Dirt I'm Buried In" single
No.	Title	Length
1.	"The Dirt I'm Buried In"	4:04
2.	"Dance Devil Dance"	4:00
3.	"Valley of Disease"	4:08
Total length:		12:13

"The Dirt I'm Buried In (live in Paris)" single
No.	Title	Length
1.	"The Dirt I'm Buried In" (live in Paris)	4:18
2.	"The Dirt I'm Buried In"	4:04
Total length:		8:23

Notes

- Apple Music lists only the first track for the "Live in Paris" single.

== Chart performance ==
"The Dirt I'm Buried In" reached No. 1 on the Billboard Mainstream Rock Airplay chart dated September 2, 2023, giving Avatar their first No. 1 on a Billboard chart. It reached No. 1 in its 31st week, marking the longest climb to No. 1 on the chart in more than 20 years and tying Young Guns' "Bones" for the second-longest climb in the chart's history. The song also gave Avatar their first top-10 on the Rock & Alternative Airplay chart.

== Personnel ==
Credits adapted from Apple Music.

Avatar

- John Alfredsson – drums
- Jonas Jarlsby – electric guitar
- Johannes Eckerström – lead vocals, keyboards
- Henrik Sandelin – bass, backing vocals
- Tim Öhrström – electric guitar, backing vocals

Additional musicians

- Jay Ruston – programming
- Walter Bäcklin – programming

Production and engineering

- Jay Ruston – producer, mixing engineer
- Avatar – producer
- Paul Logas – mastering engineer
- John Douglass – recording engineer

== Charts ==
=== Weekly charts ===
Weekly chart performance for "The Dirt I'm Buried In"
Chart (2023)	Peak position
Canada Rock (Billboard)	34
Czech Republic Rock (IFPI)	2
Finland (Suomen virallinen lista)	74
Germany Rock Airplay (GfK)	21
US Rock & Alternative Airplay (Billboard)	9
US Mainstream Rock Airplay (Billboard)	1

=== Year-end charts ===
Year-end chart performance for "The Dirt I'm Buried In"
Chart (2023)	Position
US Rock & Alternative Airplay (Billboard)	50
US Mainstream Rock Airplay (Billboard)	5
