= Schlacht (Avatar album) =

Studio album by Avatar
- Released: 24 October 2007
- Studio: Gain Studio, Gothenburg, Sweden
- Genre: Melodic death metal
- Length: 38:16
- Label: Gain Music Entertainment
- Producer: Markus Tagaris; Avatar

Avatar chronology
Thoughts of No Tomorrow (2006)	Schlacht (2007)	Avatar (2009)

Schlacht is the second studio album by Swedish heavy metal band Avatar, released on 24 October 2007. The album reached at #27 on the Swedish album chart.

== Track listing ==
No.	Title	Length
1.	"Schlacht"	2:37
2.	"Wildflower"	2:41
3.	"All Which Is Black"	2:53
4.	"4 AM Breakdown"	2:28
5.	"As It Is"	3:53
6.	"All Hail the Queen"	2:26
7.	"When Your Darkest Hour Comes"	2:03
8.	"I Still Hate You"	3:18
9.	"One/One/One/Three"	2:50
10.	"Die with Me"	6:02
11.	"The End of Our Ride"	3:10
12.	"Letters from Neverend" (featuring Björn Gelotte)	3:48
Total length:		38:16

== Personnel ==
Credits retrieved from AllMusic.

Avatar

- Johannes Eckerström – lead vocals
- Jonas "Kungen" Jarlsby – guitars
- Simon Andersson – guitars
- Henrik Sandelin – bass, backing vocals
- John Alfredsson – drums

Additional musicians

- Martin Hall – keyboards, programming
- Björn Gelotte – guest guitar solo on track 12
- Henrik Blomqvist and Martin Westerstrand – choir

Additional personnel

- Markus Tagaris – A&R, engineering, production
- Avatar – production
- Sebastian "Zeb O" Olsson – engineering, mixing, programming, editing
- Mattias Wänerstam – mixing
- Dragan Tanaskovic – mastering
- Jakob Herrmann – drum technician
- Bloodstained Art Entertainment – management
- Phillip von Preuschen – illustrations
- Andreas Wretljung – layout
- Rasmus Lindgren and Daniel Falk – photography
