= Thoughts of No Tomorrow =

Studio album by Avatar
- Released: 25 January 2006
- Studio: Gain Studio, Gothenburg, Sweden
- Genre: Melodic death metal
- Length: 40:24
- Label: Gain Music Entertainment
- Producer: Roberth Olausson

Avatar chronology
4 Reasons to Die (2004)	Thoughts of No Tomorrow (2006)	Schlacht (2007)

Thoughts of No Tomorrow is the debut studio album by Swedish heavy metal band Avatar, released on 25 January 2006. The album peaked at #47 on the Sweden Albums Top 60.

Professional ratings
Review scores
Source	Rating
Metal Storm	7/10

== Track listing ==
No.	Title	Length
1.	"Bound to the Wall"	3:27
2.	"And I Bid You Farewell"	3:24
3.	"Last One Standing"	3:38
4.	"War Song"	2:14
5.	"The Willy"	4:21
6.	"My Shining Star"	3:43
7.	"My Lie"	3:50
8.	"Stranger"	5:50
9.	"The Skinner"	1:56
10.	"Sane?"	2:15
11.	"Slave Hive Meltdown"	5:42
Total length:		40:24

== Personnel ==
Credits retrieved from AllMusic.

Avatar

- Johannes Eckerström – lead vocals
- Jonas "Kungen" Jarlsby – guitars
- Simon Andersson – guitars
- Henrik Sandelin – bass, backing vocals
- John Alfredsson – drums

Additional musicians

- Staffan Åberg – keyboards
- Daniel Gill – guest guitar solo
- Andreas Wretljung – choir, layout
- Erik Alfredsson, Alexander Bengtsson, Anders Ek Bredin, Erik Christiansson, Timothy Gramnaes, Johan Gustafsson, Björn Lindgren, Robert Olsson, Aron Parmerud, Johan Sandelin, Johan Sjöblom and Victor Wångstedt – choir

Additional personnel

- Roberth Olausson – engineering, mixing, production
- Dragan Tanaskovic – mastering
- Avatar – arranging
- Markus Tagaris – A&R
- Phillip von Preuschen – illustrations
- Dick Risan – photography
