= Dance Devil Dance =

Studio album by Avatar
- Released: 17 February 2023
- Genres: Alternative metal; groove metal; melodic death metal; hard rock
- Length: 41:16
- Label: Thirty Tigers
- Producers: Jay Ruston; Avatar

Avatar chronology
Hunter Gatherer (2020)	Dance Devil Dance (2023)	Don't Go in the Forest (2025)

Singles from Dance Devil Dance
- 1. "Dance Devil Dance" Released: 8 November 2022; 2. "The Dirt I'm Buried In" Released: 24 January 2023

Professional ratings
Review scores
Source	Rating
Blabbermouth.net	8/10
Distorted Sound	7/10
Kerrang!	3/5 stars
Metal Hammer	3.5/5 stars
Metal Injection	7/10
Rock 'N' Load	9/10

Dance Devil Dance is the ninth studio album by Swedish heavy metal band Avatar. The album was released on 17 February 2023 through Thirty Tigers. It was mostly self-produced by the band with the assistance of Jay Ruston.

== Track listing ==
All tracks are written by Avatar.

Dance Devil Dance track listing
No.	Title	Length
1.	"Dance Devil Dance"	4:00
2.	"Chimp Mosh Pit"	3:02
3.	"Valley of Disease"	4:08
4.	"On the Beach"	4:32
5.	"Do You Feel in Control?" ( (Note: The question mark is missing from the tracklist of the physical release.))	3:09
6.	"Gotta Wanna Riot"	4:03
7.	"The Dirt I'm Buried In"	4:04
8.	"Clouds Dipped in Chrome"	3:45
9.	"Hazmat Suit"	3:35
10.	"Train"	2:59
11.	"Violence No Matter What" (duet with Lzzy Hale)	3:54
Total length:		41:16

== Personnel ==
Credits adapted from AllMusic.

Avatar

- Johannes Eckerström – lead vocals, trumpet, piano, keyboards
- Jonas "Kungen" Jarlsby – guitars
- Tim Öhrström – guitars, backing vocals
- Henrik Sandelin – bass, backing vocals
- John Alfredsson – drums

Additional musicians

- Lzzy Hale – duet vocals on track 11

Additional personnel

- Jay Ruston – mixing, production, programming, sampling
- Avatar – production, programming, sampling
- John Douglass – engineering
- Walter Bäcklin – programming, sampling
- Paul Logus – mastering
- Oscar Nilsson – overdubs
- George Cappellini Jr. – A&R, management
- Mike Cortada – artwork, layout
- Ben Adelberg and Johan Carlén – photography

== Charts ==
Chart performance for Dance Devil Dance
Chart (2025)	Peak position
French Rock & Metal Albums (SNEP)	80
