= New Land (song) =

Single by Avatar

from the album Feathers & Flesh
- Released: 6 March 2017
- Recorded: 2016
- Length: 4:31
- Label: Entertainment One
- Songwriters: John Alfredsson; Johannes Eckerström; Jonas Jarlsby; Tim Öhrström; Henrik Sandelin
- Producer: Sylvia Massy

Avatar singles chronology
"Night Never Ending" (2016)	"New Land" (2017)	"A Statue of the King" (2017)

"New Land" is a single by Swedish heavy metal band Avatar off their sixth studio album Feathers & Flesh. It peaked at number 20 on the US Billboard Mainstream Rock Songs chart in 2017.

== Background and concept ==
The song "New Land" comes from Avatar's studio album Feathers & Flesh, a concept album. The album's overarching concept is telling a fable-like story about an "owl who goes to war against the world to stop the sun from rising." Frontman Johannes Eckerstrom described how the song's message fit in to the overall narrative of the concept album:

This is the first time we see weakness exposed in the Owl. The Eagle threatens to eat her eggs, so she flies away from the forest to hide them far, far away, and in the lyrics, she swears to protect them no matter what – but it’s an empty promise because you cannot always protect your children from the world. You don’t have to fear a terrorist attack every morning on your way to school, but whether it happens or not is something totally beyond your control.

The band released a music video for the song on 6 March 2017. Parting from the song's message in the concept album, the band is instead featured as exploring a fictional version of TRAPPIST-1, and encountering unfriendly inhabitants there. Eckerstrom stated that the band agreed not to do any literal interpretations for any of the songs on the concept album, desiring to present the song's themes in a different light.

== Personnel ==
- Johannes Eckerström - lead vocals
- Jonas "Kungen" Jarlsby - guitars
- Tim Öhrström - guitar
- Henrik Sandelin - bass
- John Alfredsson - drums

== Charts ==
Chart (2017)	Peak position
US Mainstream Rock	20
