= Avatar (Avatar album) =

Studio album by Avatar
- Released: 20 November 2009
- Genre: Melodic death metal; groove metal
- Length: 43:06
- Label: Gain Music Entertainment
- Producer: Markus Tagaris

Avatar chronology
Schlacht (2007)	Avatar (2009)	Black Waltz (2012)

Avatar is the third studio album by Swedish heavy metal band Avatar, released on 20 November 2009.

== Track listing ==
No.	Title	Length
1.	"Queen of Blades"	4:29
2.	"The Great Pretender"	4:03
3.	"Shattered Wings"	3:36
4.	"Reload"	4:13
5.	"Out of Our Minds"	4:30
6.	"Deeper Down"	3:47
7.	"Revolution of Two"	5:08
8.	"Roadkill"	3:30
9.	"Pigfucker"	2:05
10.	"Lullaby (Death All Over)"	7:46
Total length:		43:06

== Charts ==
Chart	Peak position
Swedish Albums (Sverigetopplistan)	36
