= Lindome =

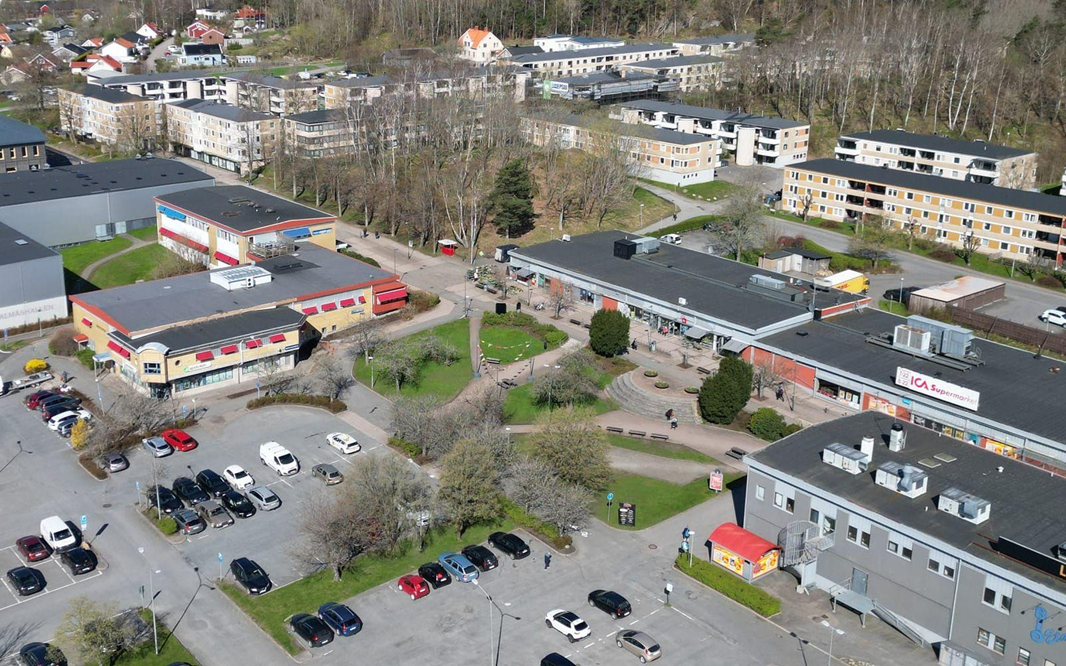
- Central Lindome in April 2006

- Location within Västra Götaland Location within Sweden
- Coordinates: 57°34′N 12°06′E
- Country: Sweden
- Province: Halland
- County: Västra Götaland County
- Municipality: Mölndal Municipality

Area
  - Total: 7.29 km^{2} (2.81 sq mi)

Population (31 December 2010)
  - Total: 11,037
  - Density: 1,514/km^{2} (3,920/sq mi)
- Time zone: UTC+1 (CET)
  - Summer (DST): UTC+2 (CEST)

Lindome (Swedish pronunciation: [ˈlɪ̂nːdɔmɛ]) is a civil parish and a locality situated in Mölndal Municipality, Västra Götaland County, Sweden with 13,830 inhabitants in the parish in 2009 (11,037 inhabitants in the locality in 2010). The Swedish comic creator Rune Andreasson was born in this small town 1925.

== Topography ==
Lindome lies roughly 10–15 kilometres inland from the Swedish west coast and the Kattegat sea, with the coastal town of Kungsbacka located to the south. The proximity to the coast gives Lindome easy access to coastal landscapes while the locality itself is surrounded by forests, lakes, and agricultural land.

== Points of interest ==
Lindome Church

Lindome Church is a parish church belonging to the Church of Sweden. The current building dates from the 19th century, although a church has existed on the site since the Middle Ages. The church is centrally located and remains an active place of worship, serving the local community. Its architecture reflects typical ecclesiastical design of the period in western Sweden.

Spinneriet

Spinneriet is a former textile mill located along the Lindome River. Originally established as an industrial facility, the building has been redeveloped and today houses small businesses, design studios, shops, and cafés. The site represents Lindome’s industrial heritage and its transition from manufacturing to mixed commercial and cultural use.

Recreational Lakes

Several lakes in and around Lindome are used for swimming and outdoor recreation during the summer months. Lakes such as Linduvesjön and other nearby freshwater lakes provide public bathing areas, walking paths, and access to nature. These sites are part of the locality’s recreational life and reflect the strong outdoor traditions of the region.

Power grid

In Lindome there is the static inverter plant of the Konti-Skan HVDC system. On the area of the static inverter plant, there is also a 120.1 metres tall guyed mast, which carries antennas for transmitting telecommands for controlling the Konti-Skan system towards Denmark.

== Sports ==
The following sports clubs are located in Lindome:

- Lindome GIF
- Lindome BTK
- Lindome IBK

== Image Gallery ==
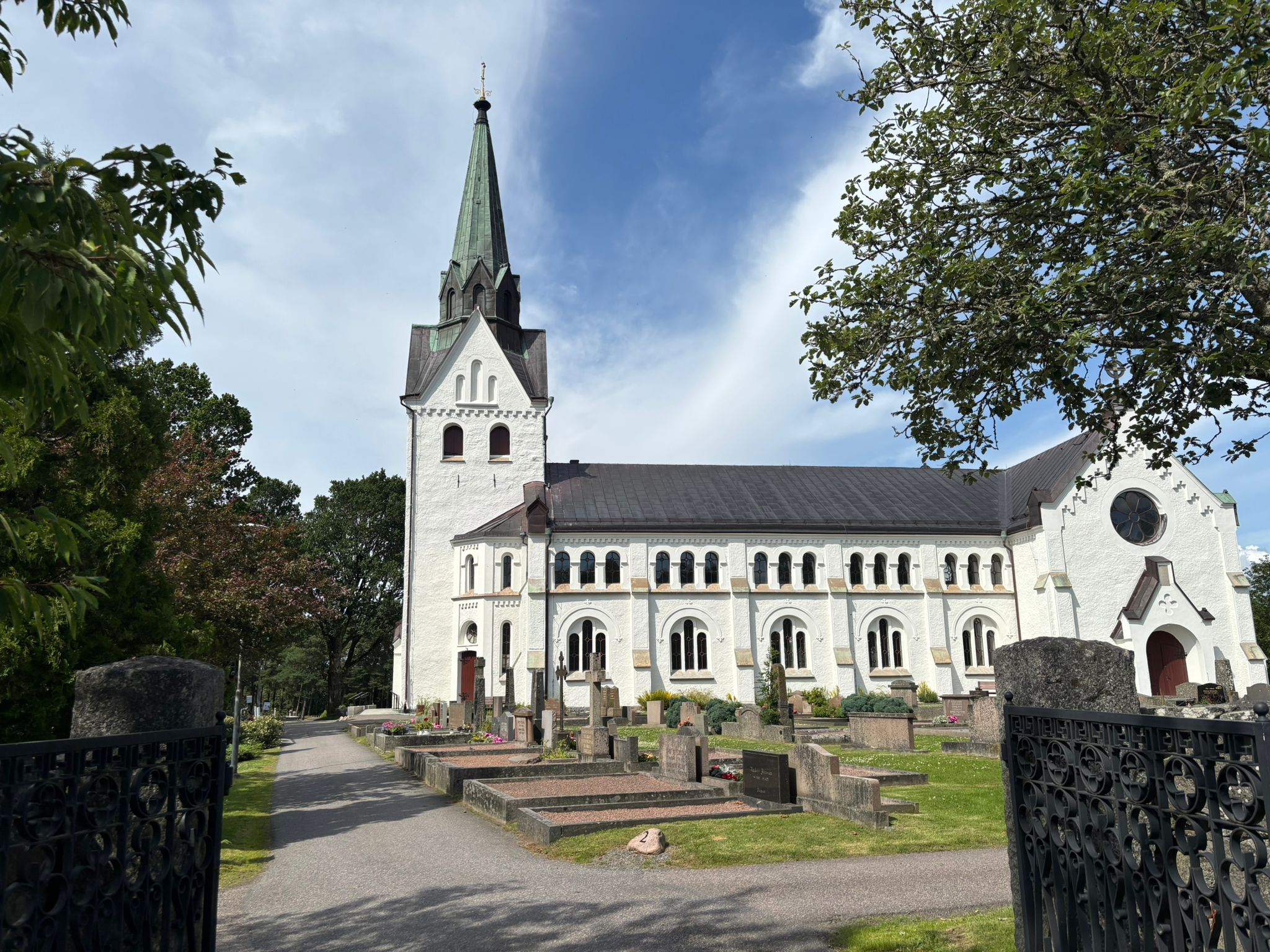
Lindome church located on a hill overlooking the parish.

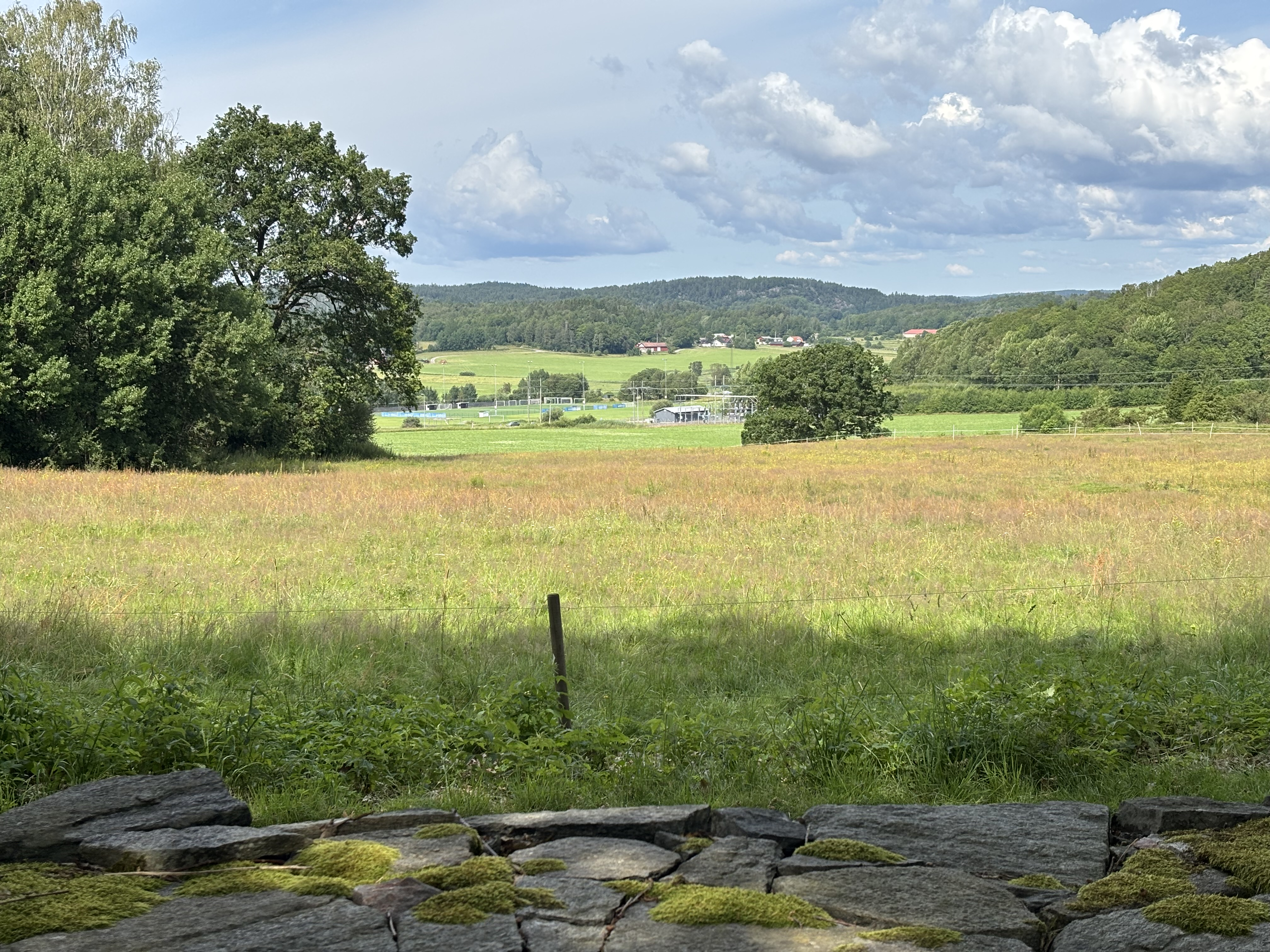
View from the church.

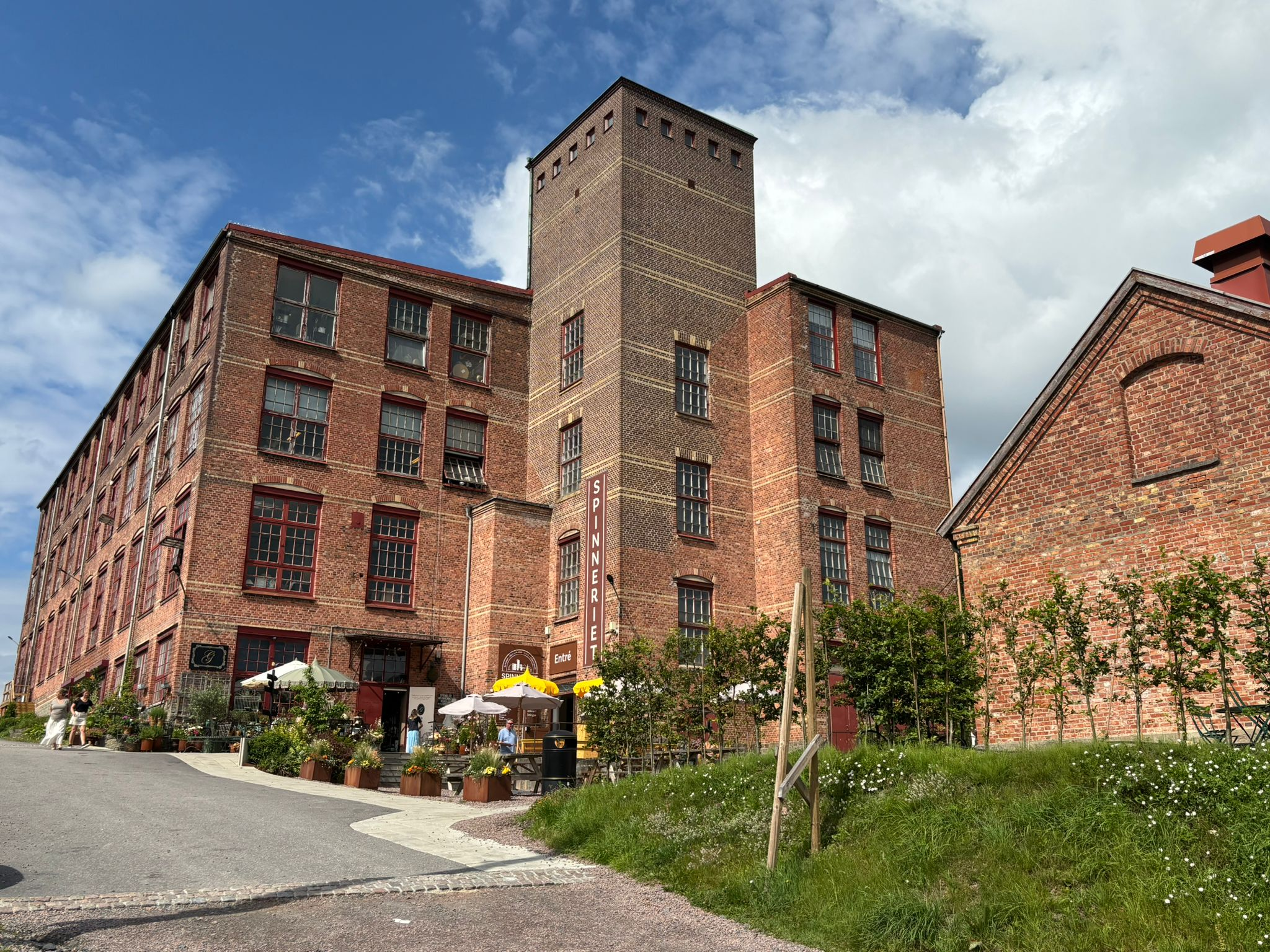
Spinneriet - popular attraction with shopping and art.

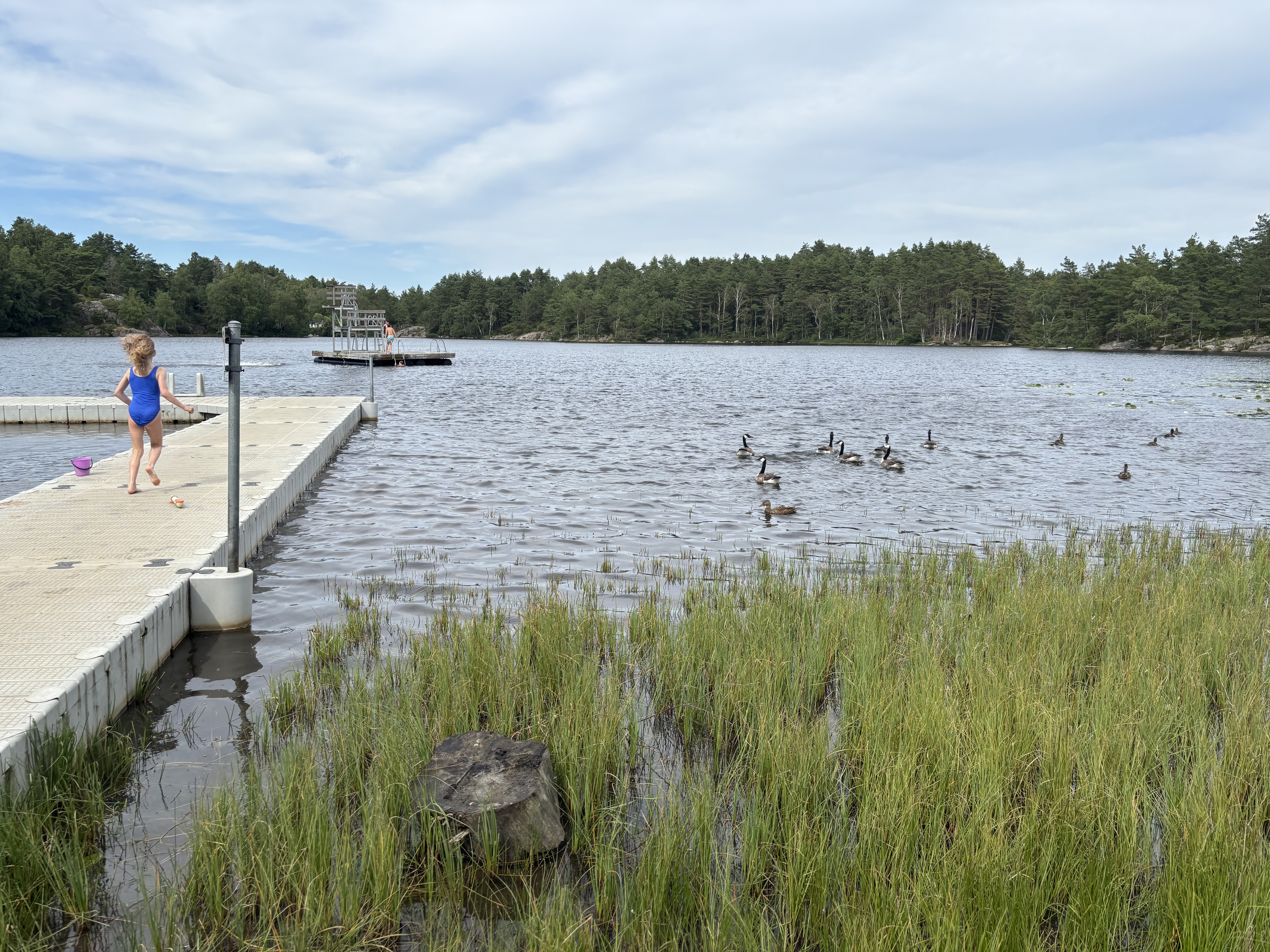
Barnsjön - a popular lake in the summer for recreation.

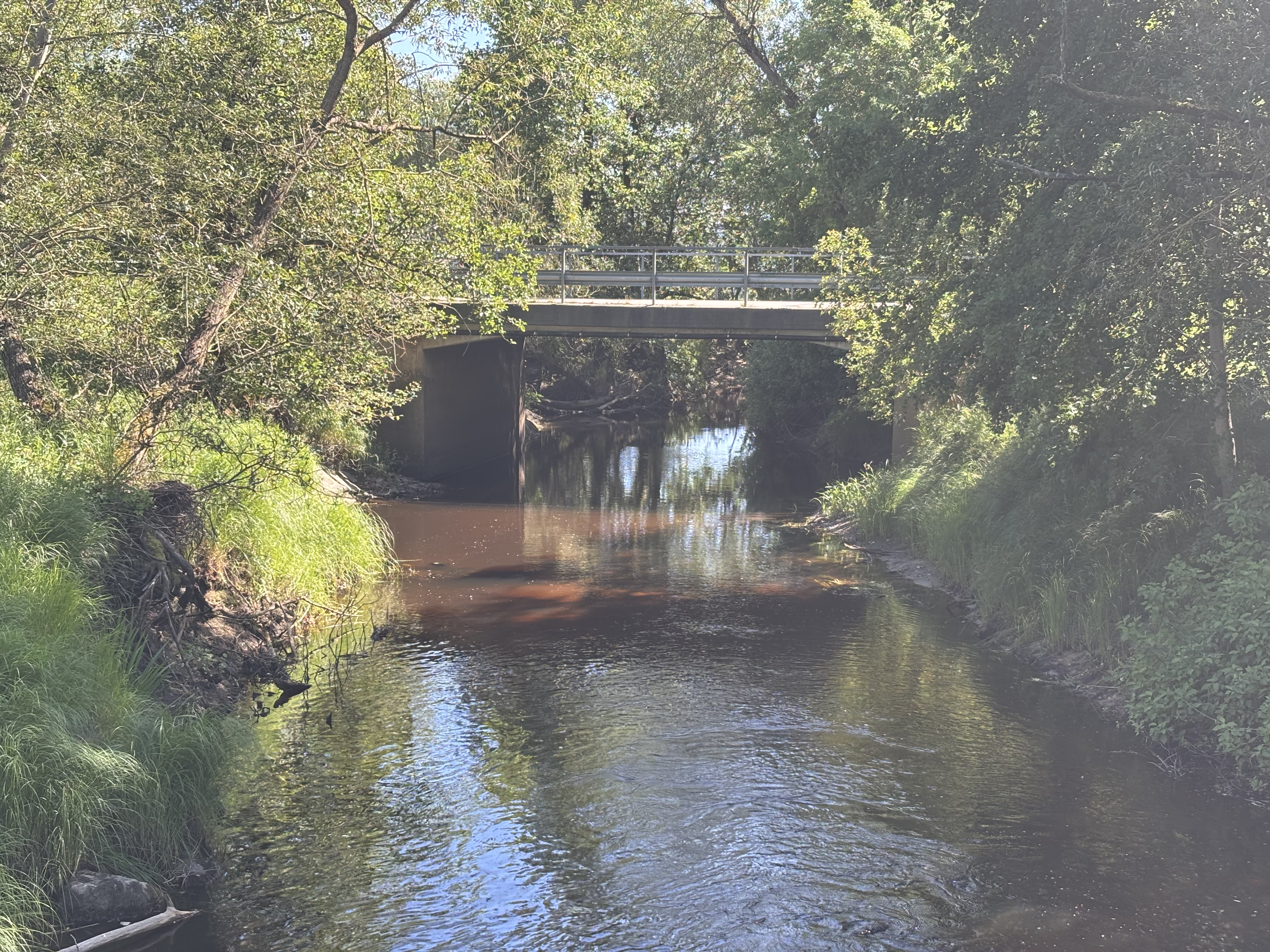
Bridge over the river.

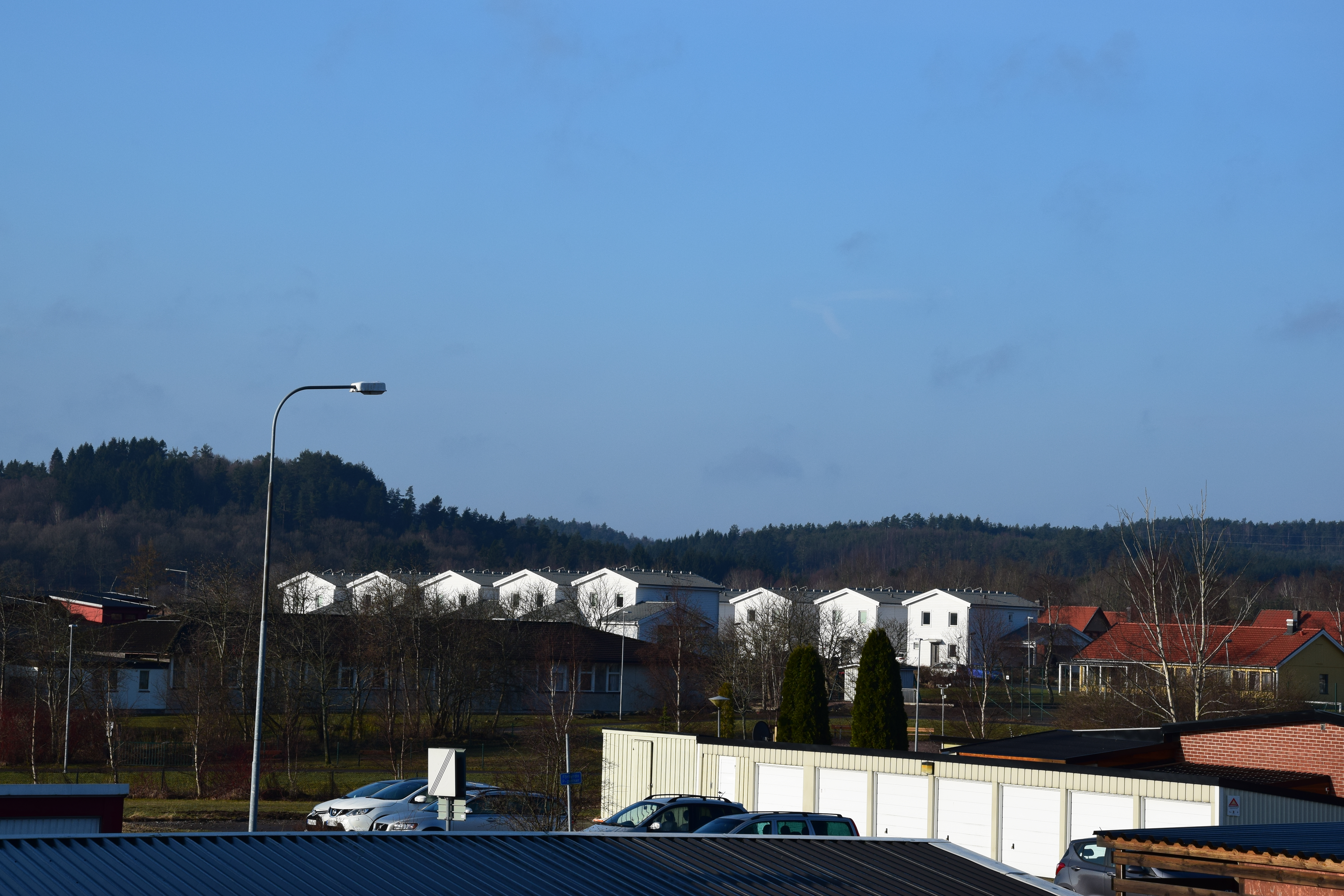
New construction seen from Holmåkravägen.

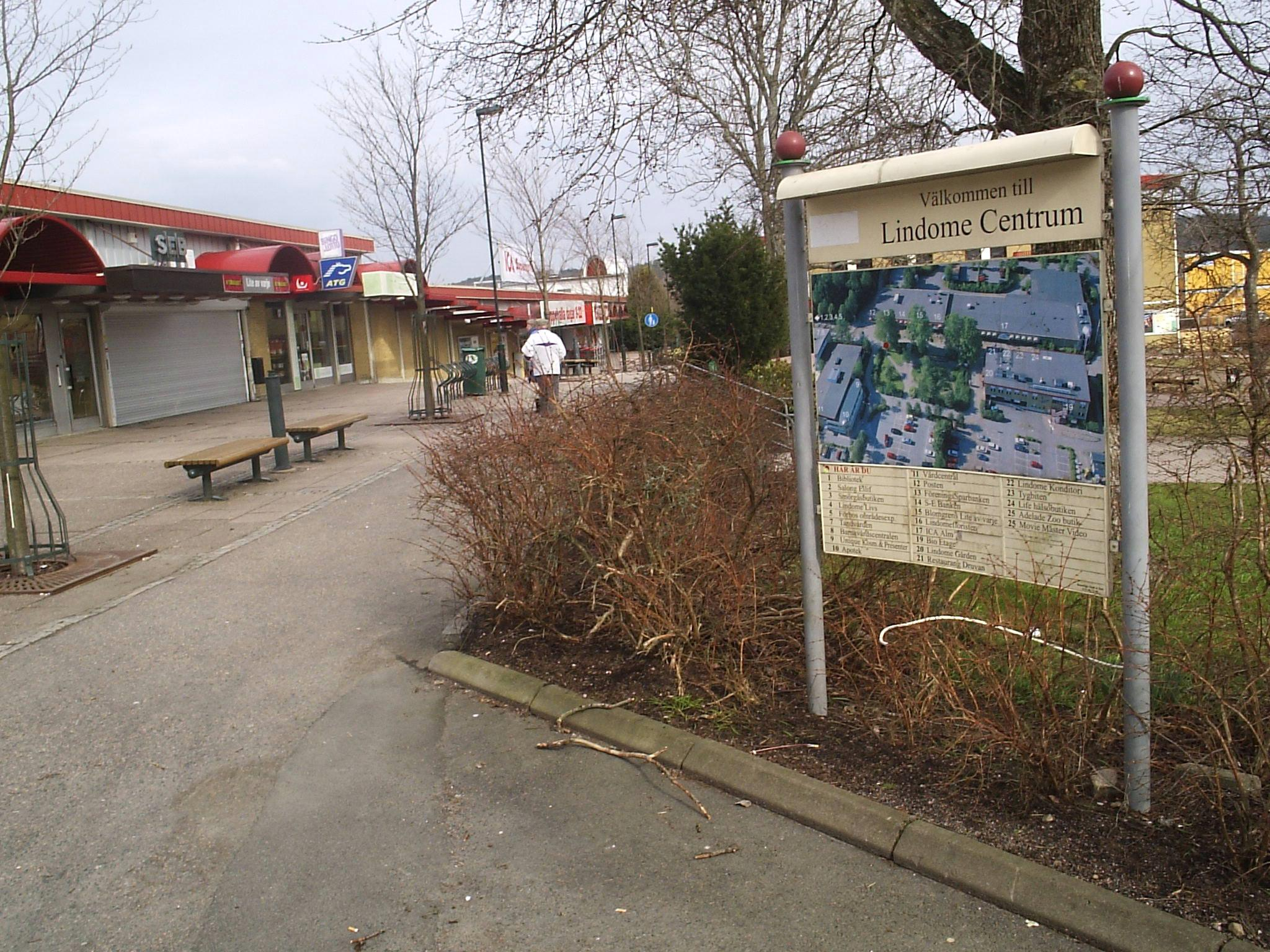
Parish center, built in the 1970s.

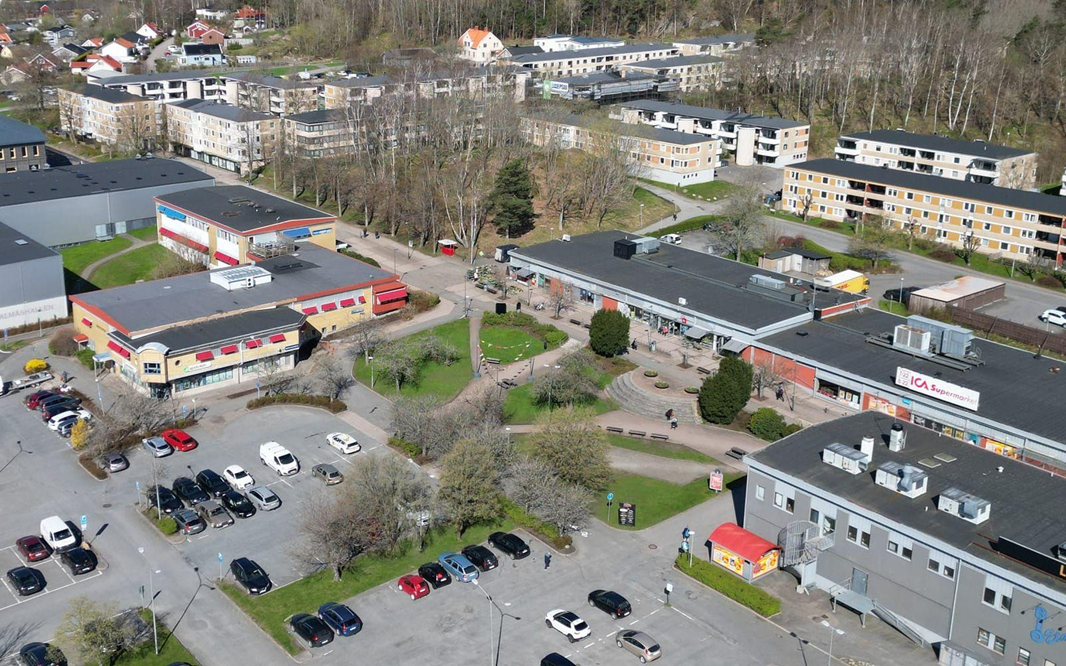
Lindome center.
