= List of museums in Florida =

This article lists museums currently operating across the U.S. state of Florida, together with summaries of their locations and main focuses. There are additional lists of Florida's defunct and proposed museums.

== Museums ==
Museum Name	Image	Community	County	Region	Type	Notes
A. E. Backus Gallery & Museum		Fort Pierce	St. Lucie	Central East	Art	Features landscapes by A. E. Backus and pieces by other Florida artists
A. Quinn Jones Museum and Cultural Center		Gainesville	Alachua	North Central	History	Former home of A. Quinn Jones
ACCORD Civil Rights Museum		St. Augustine	St. Johns	Northeast	Ethnic-African American	Former dental office of Dr.Robert Hayling, which also served as a meetinghouse for the St. Augustine Movement. Currently a private residence.
African-American Research Library and Cultural Center		Fort Lauderdale	Broward	Southeast	Haitian art	Branch of the Broward County Library
African American Museum of the Arts		DeLand	Volusia	Central East	Art	Art and culture of African Americans and Caribbean Americans
Ah-Tah-Thi-Ki Museum		Clewiston	Hendry	Southwest	Ethnic-Native American	Managed by the Seminole Tribe of Florida at the Big Cypress Indian Reservation, artifacts, culture, and life of the Seminole in the swamps of Florida
Air Force Armament Museum		Eglin Air Force Base	Okaloosa	Northwest	Aerospace	Air Force planes, bombs, missiles, rockets, and other military weapons
Air Force Space and Missile Museum		Cape Canaveral	Brevard	Central East	Aerospace	Houses artifacts from early space program and includes extensive outdoor rocket garden with vintage missiles and rockets.
Airport Museum		Melbourne	Brevard	Central East	Aviation	Houses displays on Naval Air Station Melbourne and Melbourne International Airport.
Albin Polasek Museum and Sculpture Gardens		Winter Park	Orange	Central	Art	Sculptures of Albin Polasek and others, and changing art exhibits
Alexander Brest Museum and Gallery		Jacksonville	Duval	Northeast	Art	Part of Jacksonville University, includes changing exhibits of contemporary art, collections of carved ivory, Pre-Columbian artifacts, Steuben glass, Chinese porcelain, Cloisonné, Tiffany glass, and Boehm porcelain
Alfred B. Maclay Gardens State Park		Tallahassee	Leon	North Central	Historic house	28 acres (110,000 m^{2}) of ornamental gardens, 1920s-1940s period Maclay House
Amelia Island Light		Fernandina Beach	Nassau	Northeast	Maritime	
Amelia Island Museum of History		Fernandina Beach	Nassau	Northeast	Local history	Housed in a former jail
American Museum of the Cuban Diaspora		Miami	Miami-Dade	Southwest	Ethnic-Cuban American	
American Muscle Car Museum		Melbourne	Brevard	Central East	Automotive	Not open to the public except for charitable events
American Police Hall of Fame & Museum		Titusville	Brevard	Central East	Law enforcement	Police weapons, vehicles, equipment, badges, uniforms, procedures and more
American Victory Ship and Museum		Tampa	Hillsborough	Central West	Maritime	World War II cargo ship
American Water Ski Educational Foundation Hall of Fame and Museum		Polk City	Polk	Central	Sports	Also known as Water Ski Hall of Fame, features water ski and boating memorabilia
Anita S. Wooten Gallery		Orlando	Orange	Central	Art	website, part of the Valencia College, East Campus
Anna Lamar Switzer Center for Visual Arts		Pensacola	Escambia	Northwest	Art	website, contemporary art exhibits, part of Pensacola State College
Ann Norton Sculpture Gardens		West Palm Beach	Palm Beach	Southeast	Art	Artist's home, studio and outdoor sculpture gardens
Anna Maria Island Museum and Historical Park		Anna Maria Island	Manatee	Southwest	Local history	website
Apalachicola Maritime Museum		Apalachicola	Franklin	Northwest	Maritime	Area maritime heritage, boat building, boat tours, 57-foot ketch
Appleton Museum of Art		Ocala	Marion	Central	Art	Part of College of Central Florida, collections include sculptures, 19th-century paintings, Pre-Columbian, African, European and Asian arts and antiquities
Arcadia Mill		Milton	Santa Rosa	Northwest	History	Remains of an early 19th-century industrial water-powered mill complex
Arch Creek Park		North Miami Beach	Miami-Dade	Southeast	History	8-acre park with museum containing Native American and pioneer artifacts, natural history programs
Archer Historical Society Museum		Archer	Alachua	North Central	Local history	Housed in a railroad depot
Armory Art Center		West Palm Beach	Palm Beach	Southeast	Art	website, community art center with exhibit gallery
Art and Culture Center of Hollywood		Hollywood	Broward	Southeast	Art	Contemporary visual and performing arts
Art Center Sarasota		Sarasota	Sarasota	Southwest	Art	Visual arts center with exhibit galleries and a sculpture garden
ArtCenter Manatee		Bradenton	Manatee	Southwest	Art	website
Arts and Design Society of Fort Walton Beach		Fort Walton Beach	Okaloosa	Northwest	Art	website, visual arts center with exhibit gallery
Art League of Daytona Beach Gallery		Daytona Beach	Volusia	Central East	Art	Exhibits by local artists
ArtCenter/South Florida		Miami Beach	Miami-Dade	Southeast	Art	website, gallery
Atlantic Center for the Arts		New Smyrna Beach	Volusia	Central East	Art	Includes galleries in two locations
Audubon House and Tropical Gardens		Key West	Monroe	Florida Keys	Historic house	1830s period home of artist and ornithologist John James Audubon, includes gallery of his art
Bailey-Matthews Shell Museum		Sanibel	Lee	Southwest	Natural history	Shells and mollusks
Baker Block Museum		Baker	Okaloosa	Northwest	Local history	Complex includes the museum with antiques, tools and period displays, a post office, mill, log cabin, blacksmith shop, corn crib, and outhouse
Barbara Sumwalt Museum		Bokeelia	Lee	Southwest	Local history	Operated by the Useppa Island Historical Society
Barnacle Historic State Park		Coconut Grove	Miami-Dade	Southeast	Historic house	Includes 19th century period home and boathouse of yacht designer Ralph Middleton Munroe
Bass Museum of Art		Miami Beach	Miami-Dade	Southeast	Art	Collections include Renaissance and Baroque paintings, Rococo court painting and English portraiture, painting and sculpture of North America, 19th and 20th century landscape and history paintings, painting and sculpture of North America, Latin America and the Caribbean, contemporary photography, Asian art, European decorative art
Beaches Museum and History Park		Jacksonville	Duval	Northeast	Local history	Operated by the Beaches Area Historical Society, history and culture of the Jacksonville Beaches area
Bienes Museum of the Modern Book		Fort Lauderdale	Broward	Southeast	Library	Changing exhibits from its collections
Bill Baggs Cape Florida State Park		Key Biscayne	Miami-Dade	Southeast	Maritime	Tours of Cape Florida Lighthouse and keeper's quarters
Black Heritage Museum		Middleburg	Clay	Northeast	Ethnic-African American	Open by appointment
Black Heritage Museum		New Smyrna Beach	Volusia	Central East	Ethnic-African American	
Blanchard House Museum		Charlotte Harbor	Charlotte	Southwest	Ethnic-African American	Area African American history and culture
Bob Rauschenberg Gallery		Fort Myers	Lee	Southwest	Art	Modern and contemporary international art in all media, part of Florida SouthWestern State College, Lee County Campus
Boca Raton Children's Museum		Boca Raton	Palm Beach	Southeast	Children's	Hands-on exhibits and exploration areas for young children
Boca Express Train Museum		Boca Raton	Palm Beach	Southeast	Railroad	Includes restored rail cars & a steam engine
Boca Raton History Museum		Boca Raton	Palm Beach	Southeast	Local history	Located in former Town Hall, operated by the Boca Raton Historical Society
Boca Raton Museum of Art		Boca Raton	Palm Beach	Southeast	Art	Collections include 19th and 20th century European and American painting, drawings and sculpture; West African and Pre-Columbian art; modern and contemporary art; decorative arts and sculpture
Bok Tower Gardens		Lake Wales	Polk	Central	Historic house	1930s period mansion, carillon and botanical gardens
Bonnet House Museum & Gardens		Fort Lauderdale	Broward	Southeast	Historic house	20th century estate with art exhibits and gardens
Eastern Florida State College Planetarium & Observatory		Cocoa	Brevard	Central East	Science	Exhibits are at Science Quest Exhibit Hall at Eastern Florida State College, also planetarium (temporarily closed), observatory and art exhibits.
Brevard Museum of History & Natural Science		Cocoa	Brevard	Central East	Multiple	Natural history, science, local history and culture, operated by Florida Historical Society.
Bronson-Mulholland House		Palatka	Putnam	Northeast	Historic house	Mid 19th-century mansion, operated by the Putnam County Historical Society
Brooksville Railroad Depot Museum		Brooksville	Hernando	Central West	Railroad	Includes local history
Browning Railroad Museum		Palatka	Putnam	Northeast	Railroad	Operated by the Palatka Railroad Preservation Society in the Palatka Railroad Depot, includes model train layout
Bulow Plantation Ruins Historic State Park		Flagler Beach	Flagler	Northeast	History	Plantation ruins and exhibits
Burroughs Home		Fort Myers	Lee	Southwest	Historic house	Turn-of-the-20th-century period house, open once a week for living history tours
Butler House Museum		Deerfield Beach	Broward	Southeast	Historic house	Operated by the Deerfield Beach Historical Society
Butterfly World		Coconut Creek	Broward	Southeast	Natural history	Live butterflies, insects and birds, gardens, museum display of mounted butterflies and insects
Cade Museum for Creativity and Invention		Gainesville	Alachua	North Central	Science	Hands-on experiments and activities related to STEAM; exhibits about inventors and their inventions.
Calusa Nature Center and Planetarium		Fort Myers	Lee	Southwest	Natural history	Includes live animals, programs and a planetarium
Camp Blanding Museum and Memorial Park		Starke	Clay	Northeast	Military	
Camp Gordon Johnston Museum		Carrabelle	Franklin	Northwest	Military	History of Camp Gordon Johnston, a WWII amphibious training base, includes artifacts, vehicles, photos, memorabilia
Cape Coral Historical Museum		Cape Coral	Lee	Southwest	Local history	website, operated by the Cape Coral Historical Society
Cape St. George Light		Apalachicola	Franklin	Northwest	Maritime	Reconstructed lighthouse to climb and keepers house
Casa Feliz Historic Home Museum		Winter Park	Orange	Central	Historic house	1930s Spanish-style estate designed by James Gamble Rogers II
Carrabelle History Museum		Carrabelle	Franklin	Northwest	History	History and culture of Carrabelle, includes Native American artifacts and the original World's Smallest Police Station
CAS Gallery		Coral Gables	Miami-Dade	Southeast	Art	website, part of University of Miami
Cason Cottage		Delray Beach	Palm Beach	Southeast	Historic house	Operated by the Delray Beach Historical Society, reflects Florida's lifestyles from 1915 to 1935
Castillo de San Marcos		St. Augustine	St. Johns	Northeast	Military	Spanish fort and museum, living history re-enactments
Cedar Key Historical Museum		Cedar Key	Levy	North Central	Local history	
Cedar Key Museum State Park		Cedar Key	Levy	North Central	Historic house	1920s period house with collection of shells and Native American artifacts
Central Florida Railroad Museum		Winter Garden	Orange	Central	Railroad	
Centre Gallery		Tampa	Hillsborough	Central West	Art	website, student-run gallery in the Marshall Center at the Wolfson campus, University of South Florida
Charlotte County Historical Center		Charlotte Harbor	Charlotte	Southwest	Local history	website, located at Bayshore Live Oak Park, county history and culture
Child of the Sun Visitor Center		Lakeland	Polk	Central	Architecture	Photographs, furniture, and drawings depicting Frank Lloyd Wright's relationship with Florida Southern College, also Wright exhibits
Children's Museum of the Highlands		Sebring	Highlands	Central	Children's	website, interactive play experiences
Children's Science Explorium		Boca Raton	Palm Beach	Southeast	Science	website, located in Sugar Sand Park
Clay County Historical Society Museum		Green Cove Springs	Clay	Northeast	Local history	Located in an old depot, also railroad memorabilia
Clewiston Museum		Clewiston	Hendry	Southwest	Local history	Houses exhibits highlighting the local Clewiston area, including the cattle industry, commercial fishing & Seminole Indians.
Cocoa Beach Surf Museum		Cocoa Beach	Brevard	Central East	History	Located in Ron Jon Surf Shop.
Collection on Palmetto		Clearwater	Pinellas	Central West	Automotive	Museum of antique automobiles and engines
Coral Castle		Homestead	Miami-Dade	Southeast	Art	Stone sculpture castle structure and garden
Corporal Larry E. Smedley National Vietnam War Museum		Orlando	Orange	Central	Military	Vietnam War artifacts, equipment, photos
Coastal Heritage Museum		Crystal River	Citrus	Central West	Local history	Located in the historic old city hall
Colonial Quarter		St. Augustine	St. Johns	Northeast	Living	Life of Spanish soldiers and their families in 1740 St. Augustine
Conrad Center		DeLand	Volusia	Central East	Local history	Operated by the West Volusia Historical Society, part of a complex that also includes the Henry A. DeLand House Museum and Lue Gim Gong Memorial Garden
Constitution Convention Museum State Park		Port St. Joe	Gulf	Northwest	History	Recreated hall with life-size audio-animated figures telling the story of the first Constitution Convention of Florida, also exhibits of 19th century life
Coral Gables Merrick House		Coral Gables	Miami-Dade	Southeast	Historic house	1925 period home of the founder of Coral Gables
Coral Springs Museum of Art		Coral Springs	Broward	Southeast	Art	Focus is present day, nationally recognized and Florida artists who create traditional, modern and Postmodern art
Rollins Museum of Art		Winter Park	Orange	Central	Art	Part of Rollins College, collection includes art and objects from antiquity to the 21st century
Cornell Art Museum at Old School Square		Delray Beach	Palm Beach	Southeast	Art	Located in the Old School Square Cultural Arts Center, exhibits of fine art, craft and American culture
Cracker Country		Tampa	Hillsborough	Central West	Living	Late 19th century rural village
Cracker Trail Museum		Zolfo Springs	Hardee	Central	History	Located along the original Florida Cracker Trail, Florida pioneer history
Crane Point Museum, Nature Center & Historic Site		Marathon	Monroe	Florida Keys	Natural history	Includes museum of natural history, children's museum, bird rehabilitation center
Crealdé School of Art		Winter Park	Orange	Central	Art	Features three galleries: Alice & William Jenkins Gallery, Showalter Hughes Community Gallery, & Contemporary Sculpture Garden
Crooked River Lighthouse		Carrabelle	Franklin	Northwest	Maritime	Late 19th-century lighthouse to climb, Keeper's House Museum
Crowley Natural and Cultural History Center		Sarasota	Sarasota	Southwest	Multiple	website, includes museum of pioneer history, pioneer cabin, blacksmith shop, working sugar cane mill, restored 1892-period Tatum House, nature trails and boardwalk
Crystal River Archaeological State Park		Crystal River	Citrus	Central West	Archaeology	Site includes 6 pre-Columbian mounds and museum with excavated finds
Cultural Center at Ponte Vedra Beach		Ponte Vedra Beach	St. Johns	Northeast	Art	Exhibitions of local, regional and national artists in a variety of media
Cummer Museum of Art and Gardens		Jacksonville	Duval	Northeast	Art	Collection includes European and American paintings, Meissen porcelain
Dade Battlefield Historic State Park		Bushnell	Sumter	Central	Military	Site of the 1835 Second Seminole War battlefield, visitor center museum about the war
Dante Fascell Visitor Center		Homestead	Miami-Dade	Southeast	Natural history	One of several visitor centers for Biscayne National Park, focus is the four ecosystems found in the park, also art gallery
Daytona 500 Experience		Daytona Beach	Volusia	Central East	Automotive	
De Soto National Memorial		Bradenton	Manatee	Southwest	History	Commemorates the 1539 landing of Hernando de Soto
DeBary Hall Historic Site		DeBary	Volusia	Central East	Historic house	10-acre (40,000 m^{2}) late 19th century estate with outbuildings
Deering Estate at Cutler		Miami	Miami-Dade	Southeast	Multiple	Historic house, art exhibits, nature tours of its 444 acres (1.80 km^{2})
DeLand House Museum		DeLand	Volusia	Central East	Historic house	Victoria period house with artifacts, operated by the West Volusia Historical Society, complex includes the Conrad Center
DeLand Memorial Hospital Museum		DeLand	Volusia	Central East	Multiple	Exhibits include 1920s operating room & apothecary, military memorabilia, early days of the area's ice and electric business, elephant-themed collectibles, toys and the West Volusia Black Heritage Gallery
DeLand Naval Air Station Museum		DeLand	Volusia	Central East	Military	Military aircraft & artifacts
Depot Museum		Avon Park	Highlands	Central	Local history	Housed in 1926 railroad depot, operated by the Historical Society of Avon Park
Destin History & Fishing Museum		Destin	Okaloosa	Northwest	Multiple	Maritime and local history
Dixie Cultural Center		Old Town	Dixie	North Central	Local history	
Don Garlits Museum of Drag Racing		Ocala	Marion	Central	Automotive	History of the sport of drag racing
Dr. Carter G. Woodson African American History Museum		St. Petersburg	Pinellas	Central West	Ethnic-African American	African American history and culture
Dudley Farm Historic State Park		Newberry	Alachua	North Central	Farm	Working farm showing agricultural development in Florida from the 1850s through the mid-1940s
Duncan Gallery of Art		DeLand	Volusia	Central East	Art	Part of Stetson University, features works by Southeast and student artists
Dundee Depot Museum		Dundee	Polk	Central	Local history	Located in an old depot, also railroad memorabilia
Dunedin Fine Art Center		Dunedin	Pinellas	Central West	Art	Art center with galleries and David L. Mason Children's Art Museum
Dunedin History Museum		Dunedin	Pinellas	Central West	Local history	Local and state history and culture
Eden Gardens State Park		Freeport	Walton	Northwest	Historic house	Includes the Wesley House with late 18th century furniture and gardens
Edison and Ford Winter Estates		Fort Myers	Lee	Southwest	Multiple	Winter estates of Thomas Edison and Henry Ford, museum with their scientific inventions, and a botanical garden
Electrotherapy Museum		West Palm Beach	Palm Beach	Southeast	Technology	Open by appointment, private collection includes static electric machines, galvanic and faradic batteries, Oudin resonators, Tesla coils, violet rays, diathermy machines and more
Elliott Museum		Hutchinson Island	Martin	Central East	Multiple	American antiques, decorative arts, baseball memorabilia, vintage automobiles, technology and inventions
Emerald Coast Science Center		Fort Walton Beach	Okaloosa	Northwest	Science	Themes include human senses, energy efficiency, color and light, animals, bubbles
Ernest Hemingway Home and Museum		Key West	Monroe	Florida Keys	Historic house	1930s residence of author Ernest Hemingway
Eugene L. Matthews Bradford County Historical Museum		Starke	Bradford	Northeast	Local history	
Eustis Historical Museum		Eustis	Lake	Central	Local history	Each room features a different theme with period antiques, also Citrus Museum
Excelsior Museum and Cultural Center		St. Augustine	St. Johns	Northeast	Ethnic-African American	Located in St. Augustine's first black public high school, area African American history
Explorations V Children's Museum		Lakeland	Polk	Central	Children's	Interactive exhibits on local history, science, agriculture, art
Fairchild Tropical Botanic Garden		Coral Gables	Miami-Dade	Southeast	Multiple	Botanic garden, butterfly conservatory, art exhibits
Family Heritage House Museum		Bradenton	Manatee	Southwest	Ethnic-African American	Part of State College of Florida, Manatee–Sarasota, gallery and resource center for the study of African-American achievements.
Fantasy of Flight		Polk City	Polk	Central	Aviation	Formerly the Weeks Air Museum, which was located in Miami
Father Miguel O'Reilly House Museum		St. Augustine	St. Johns	Northeast	Religious	Catholic heritage of St. Augustine
Flagler Beach Historical Museum		Flagler Beach	Flagler	Northeast	Local history	Photos, documents, memorabilia, prehistoric bones, shells, Native American artifacts
Flagler Museum		Palm Beach	Palm Beach	Southeast	Historic house	55 room Gilded Age mansion, also known as Whitehall
Flamingo Gardens		Davie	Broward	Southeast	Historic house	Botanical gardens and wildlife park with 1930s period Wray Home
Floral City Heritage Hall Museum		Floral City	Citrus	Central West	Local history	Operated by the Floral City Heritage Council
Florida Agricultural Museum		Palm Coast	Flagler	Northeast	Agriculture	Includes restored 1890s pioneer homestead, a turn of the last century dry goods store, five restored buildings from a 1930s Depression-Era citrus operation, and a 5,000-square-foot (460 m^{2}) dairy barn
Florida Air Museum		Lakeland	Polk	Central	Aviation	Includes one-of-a-kind designs, classics, ultra-lights, antique airplanes and warbirds
Florida Atlantic University, University Galleries		Boca Raton	Palm Beach	Southeast	Art	website, Schmidt Center Gallery and Ritter Art Gallery
Florida Carriage Museum & Resort		Weirsdale	Marion	Central	Transportation	Collection of 160 carriages, and equine-related artifacts and artwork
Florida Civilian Conservation Corps Museum		Sebring	Highlands	Central	History	Part of Highlands Hammock State Park, CCC activities in Florida
Florida Governor's Mansion		Tallahassee	Leon	North Central	Historic house	Tours by appointment
Historic Train Depot Museum		Tarpon Springs	Pinellas	Central West	History	Former railroad depot, exhibits on local history and the railroad
Florida Holocaust Museum		St. Petersburg	Pinellas	Central West	Ethnic-Jewish	
Florida Keys Eco-Discovery Center		Key West	Monroe	Florida Keys	Natural history	Plants and animals of the Florida Keys National Marine Sanctuary
Florida Maritime Museum at Cortez		Cortez	Manatee	Southwest	Maritime	Includes a shell collection, ship models, historic boats and photos
Florida Museum of Natural History		Gainesville	Alachua	North Central	Natural history	Located on the campus of the University of Florida, flora, fauna, fossils and historic peoples of the state of Florida
Florida Museum of Photographic Arts		Tampa	Hillsborough	Central West	Art	Photography, formerly Tampa Gallery of Photographic Arts
Florida Pioneer Museum		Florida City	Miami-Dade	Southeast	Local history	
Florida Postal Museum		Orange City	Volusia	Central East	Philatelic	History of postal items, postal history, and postal service
Florida Sports Hall of Fame		Auburndale	Polk	Central	Sports	Memorabilia of famous Florida athletes
Florida Railroad Museum		Parrish	Manatee	Southwest	Railroad	Heritage railroad along 6 miles of track
Florida State Capitol		Tallahassee	Leon	North Central	History	Florida's legislative history
Florida State University Museum of Fine Arts		Tallahassee	Leon	North Central	Art	website, part of Florida State University
Foosaner Art Museum		Melbourne	Brevard	Central East	Art	Collection includes Modern and Contemporary art, American industrial design, Asian art, and women artists; formerly the Brevard Art Museum
Forest Capital State Museum		Perry	Taylor	North Central	Industrial	Forest industry museum and 1864 Cracker Homestead historic house museum
Fort Barrancas		Pensacola	Escambia	Northwest	Military	Restored mid 19th-century fort, also a visitor center for the Gulf Islands National Seashore
Fort Caroline National Memorial		Jacksonville	Duval	Northeast	History	Operated by U.S. National Park Service
Fort Clinch State Park		Fernandina Beach	Nassau	Northeast	Military	Civil War living history demonstrations on the 1st weekend of the month
Fort Christmas Historical Park		Christmas	Orange	Central	Multiple	Includes restored fort and historic houses, exhibits on military, Seminole and pioneer life
Fort De Soto Park		Tierra Verde	Pinellas	Central West	Military	1,136-acre park made up of five interconnected islands, Quartermaster Storehouse Museum with displays about the late 19th-century fort
Fort East Martello Museum & Gardens		Key West	Monroe	Florida Keys	Multiple	Local history, art, military memorabilia
Fort Foster Historic Site		Zephyrhills	Pasco	Central West	Military	Restored early 19th century Seminole War fort
Fort Lauderdale Antique Car Museum		Fort Lauderdale	Broward	Southeast	Automotive	Features 22 Packards and automobile memorabilia
Fort Lauderdale History Center		Fort Lauderdale	Broward	Southeast	History	Includes main museum, a historic house museum and a schoolhouse
Fort Matanzas National Monument		St. Augustine	St. Johns	Northeast	Military	1740 Spanish fort
Fort Meade Historical Museum		Fort Meade	Polk	Central	Local history	Located in the Old Fort Meade School House
Fort Mose Historic State Park		St. Augustine	St. Johns	Northeast	History	Park and museum at site of the first legally sanctioned free African settlement in what is now the United States
Fort Walton Beach Heritage Park & Cultural Center		Fort Walton Beach	Okaloosa	Northwest	Multiple	Includes the Indian Temple Mound Museum with exhibits depicting 12,000 years of Native American occupation and the Fort Walton Temple Mound, the Camp Walton Schoolhouse Museum with early education displays, the Garnier Post Office Museum with postal history items from 1918 to 1956, and the Civil War Exhibits building
Fort Zachary Taylor Historic State Park		Key West	Monroe	Florida Keys	Military	Civil War fort
Foster Tanner Fine Arts Gallery		Tallahassee	Leon	North Central	Art	Gallery at Florida A&M University, focus is art from the African diaspora
Fountain of Youth Archaeological Park		St. Augustine	St. Johns	Northeast	Local history	Site of Ponce de León's Fountain of Youth, includes native and colonial artifacts and historic structures
Four Arts Gardens		Palm Beach	Palm Beach	Southeast	Art	Also known as Philip Hulitar Sculpture Gardens, outdoor sculpture gardens
FPL Energy Encounter		Hutchinson Island	Martin	Central East	Science	website, operated by Florida Power & Light, exhibits about electricity and energy generation, adjacent to the St. Lucie Nuclear Power Plant
Frances Wolfson Gallery		Miami	Miami-Dade	Southeast	Art	At Wolfson Campus, Miami Dade College
Fred Dana Marsh Museum		Ormond Beach	Volusia	Central East	Multiple	Located in Tomoka State Park, art, natural and cultural history
Frost Art Museum		Miami	Miami-Dade	Southeast	Art	At Florida International University, includes American modern sculptures, paintings, and photographs, contemporary Caribbean and Latin American artists
Gadsden Arts Center		Quincy	Gadsden	North Central	Art	Renovated hardware store (1912), with rotating regional & national art exhibitions and a permanent collection of vernacular art.
Gamble Plantation Historic State Park		Ellenton	Manatee	Southwest	Historic house	Antebellum plantation mansion
Genova Museum		Boynton Beach	Palm Beach	Southeast	Multiple	Star Wars, Elvis and Titanic memorabilia
Gillespie Museum		DeLand	Volusia	Central East	Geology	Earth sciences museum at Stetson University
Glazer Children's Museum		Tampa	Hillsborough	Central West	Children's	
Gold Coast Railroad Museum		Miami	Miami-Dade	Southeast	Railroad	Historic railroad cars, equipment and model train building
Golisano Children's Museum of Naples		Naples	Collier	Southwest	Children's	
Goodwood Museum and Gardens		Tallahassee	Leon	North Central	Historic house	World War I period house and gardens
Government House Museum		St. Augustine	St. Johns	Northeast	History	City history back to its founding
Grant Historical House		Grant	Brevard	Central East	Historic house	Local history
Great Explorations Children's Museum		St. Petersburg	Pinellas	Central West	Children's	
Groveland Historical Museum		Groveland	Lake	Central	Local history	Operated by the Groveland Historical Society
Gulf Beaches Historical Museum		St. Pete Beach	Pinellas	Central West	Local history	History of Pinellas County's barrier islands, located in the Pass-a-Grille Historic District
Gumbo Limbo Environmental Complex		Boca Raton	Palm Beach	Southeast	Nature center	
Haitian Heritage Museum		Miami	Miami-Dade	Southeast	Ethnic-Haitian	Art, culture and heritage of Haiti
Halifax Historical Museum		Daytona Beach	Volusia	Central East	Local history	
Hannibal Square Heritage Center		Winter Park	Orange	Central	Ethnic-African American	Operated by the Crealdé School of Art, history, heritage and art of West Winter Park's African American community
Harbor Branch Ocean Discovery Center		Fort Pierce	St. Lucie	Central East	Natural history	Includes exhibits, marine creatures and displays exploring the marine environment and depicting the research efforts of the Harbor Branch Oceanographic Institution
Hamilton County Historical Museum		Jasper	Hamilton	North Central	Prison	Former county jail
Hardee Center for the Arts		Madison	Madison	North Central	Art	website, part of North Florida Community College
Harry P. Leu Gardens		Orlando	Orange	Central	Historic house	Botanical gardens, includes the Leu House Museum, a turn-of-the-20th-century period house
Hawthorne Historical Museum & Cultural Center		Hawthorne	Alachua	North Central	Local history	
Henry B. Plant Museum		Tampa	Hillsborough	Central West	Historic house	Turn-of-the-20th-century Victorian hotel with period rooms
Heritage Museum of Northwest Florida		Valparaiso	Okaloosa	Northwest	Local history	History and culture of Okaloosa and Walton Counties
Heritage Village		Largo	Pinellas	Central West	Living	website, 21-acre (85,000 m^{2}) site includes a school, church, sponge warehouse, railroad depot and store and a variety of historic houses, and displays about agriculture, coastal living, community life and tourism; adjacent to The Florida Botanical Gardens
Hernando Heritage Museum		Brooksville	Hernando	Central West	Local history	
Highlands Museum of the Arts		Sebring	Highlands	Central	Art	Emerging art
Hillsborough River State Park		Thonotosassa	Hillsborough	Central West	Military	Includes replica of Fort Foster, an 1837 fort from the Second Seminole War
Historic Haile Homestead at Kanapaha Plantation		Gainesville	Alachua	North Central	Historic house	Mid 19th-century antebellum cotton plantation homestead
Historic Homestead Townhall Museum		Homestead	Miami-Dade	Southeast	Local history	
Historic Pensacola Village		Pensacola	Escambia	Northwest	Multiple	Includes Pensacola Museum of History, Museum of Commerce, Museum of Industry, Lavalle House, Dorr House, Old Christ Church and Lear-Rocheblave House
Historic Rossetter House Museum		Melbourne	Brevard	Central East	Historic house	Victorian period house
Historic Smallwood Store		Chokoloskee	Collier	Southwest	History	Historic general store with original goods and fixtures
Historic Spanish Point		Osprey	Sarasota	Southwest	Multiple	30-acre (120,000 m^{2}) site with prehistoric middens, a pioneer historic house museum, citrus packing house, trails and gardens
History of Diving Museum		Islamorada	Monroe	Florida Keys	Maritime	website, historical diving apparatus including helmets, air pumps, armored suits, accessory gear and sunken treasure
Holocaust Memorial on Miami Beach		Miami Beach	Miami-Dade	Southeast	Art	Outdoor sculpture garden in memory of the Holocaust
Holocaust Memorial Resource and Education Center of Florida		Maitland	Orange	Central	Ethnic-Jewish	website
Holocaust Museum of Southwest Florida		Naples	Collier	Southwest	Ethnic-Jewish	website
Homeland Heritage Park		Bartow	Polk	Central	Open air	Includes a school, church, log cabin and 1880s residence
House of Refuge Museum at Gilbert's Bar		Hutchinson Island	Martin	Central East	Maritime	Former shipwreck life-saving station with turn-of-the-20th-century furnishings
Hugh Taylor Birch State Park		Fort Lauderdale	Broward	Southeast	Multiple	Terramar Visitor Center features exhibits on the natural and local history of the park and area
IGFA Fishing Hall of Fame & Museum		Dania Beach	Broward	Southeast	Sports	Operated by the International Game Fish Association, history of recreational fishing, art, historic artifacts, scientific breakthroughs
IMAG History & Science Center		Fort Myers	Lee	Southwest	History & Science	Hands-on science and history, aquarium exhibits, live small animals
Immokalee Pioneer Museum		Immokalee	Collier	Southwest	Open air	Part of the Collier County Museum System, pioneering and ranching days of Collier County
Indian River Citrus Museum		Vero Beach	Indian River	Central East	Local history	Citrus industry in Indian River County
Indian Rocks Beach Historical Museum		Indian Rocks Beach	Pinellas	Central West	Local history	Operated by the Indian Rocks Historical Society
InterAmerican Art Gallery		Miami	Miami-Dade	Southeast	Art	information, at InterAmerican Campus, Miami Dade College
International Swimming Hall of Fame		Fort Lauderdale	Broward	Southeast	Sports	
Jacksonville Fire Museum		Jacksonville	Duval	Northeast	Firefighting	Also known as the Museum of City Fire of 1901 and the Catherine Street Fire Museum
Jacksonville University Life Sciences Museum		Jacksonville	Duval	Northeast	Natural history	Part of Jacksonville University, includes shells, fossils, bird mounts, bones, animal skins
Jewish Museum of Florida		Miami Beach	Miami-Dade	Southeast	Ethnic-Jewish	
John G. Riley House & Museum		Tallahassee	Leon	North Central	Ethnic-African American	Educational and social contributions of African Americans to Florida's history
John Gorrie State Museum		Apalachicola	Franklin	Northwest	Local history	Also history of inventor John Gorrie
Jonathan Dickinson State Park		Hobe Sound	Martin	Central East	Multiple	Features the Elsa Kimbell Environmental Education and Research Center with exhibits about the area's natural and cultural history
Richard and Pat Johnson Palm Beach County History Museum		West Palm Beach	Palm Beach	Southeast	Local history	Operated by the Historical Society of Palm Beach County
Jupiter Inlet Lighthouse & Museum		Jupiter	Palm Beach	Southeast	Maritime	Lighthouse and museum
Karpeles Manuscript Library Museum		Jacksonville	Duval	Northeast	History	One of nine facilities in the U.S. devoted to storage & presentation of original manuscripts
Kendall Art Gallery		Miami	Miami-Dade	Southeast	Art	website, at Kendall Campus, Miami Dade College
Kester Cottages		Pompano Beach	Broward	Southeast	Historic house	Operated by the Pompano Beach Historical Society, one a local history museum, the other typical of the late 1930s, open by appointment
Kennedy Space Center Visitor Complex		Merritt Island	Brevard	Central East	Aerospace	Includes tours, U.S. Astronaut Hall of Fame, Apollo-Saturn V Center, IMAX films, Astronaut Memorial
Kent Gallery at FCCJ		Jacksonville	Duval	Northeast	Art	web Kent campus
Key West Heritage House Museum and Robert Frost Cottage		Key West	Monroe	Florida Keys	Historic house	
Key West Light House and Keeper's Quarters Museum		Key West	Monroe	Florida Keys	Maritime	Lighthouse and museum
Key West Museum of Art & History		Key West	Monroe	Florida Keys	Multiple	Art and local history
Key West Shipwreck Historeum Museum		Key West	Monroe	Florida Keys	Maritime	Combines actors, films and actual artifacts from the 1985 rediscovery of the wrecked vessel Isaac Allerton
Kingsley Plantation		Jacksonville	Duval	Northeast	Open air	Operated by U.S. National Park Service, remains of an early 19th-century plantation with slave houses
Kissimmee Air Museum		Kissimmee	Osceola	Central	Aviation	Formerly known as the Flying Tigers Warbird Restoration Museum
Knott House Museum		Tallahassee	Leon	North Central	Historic house	Operated by the Museum of Florida History, mid 19th-century house with Victorian furnishings
Koreshan State Historic Site		Estero	Lee	Southwest	Open air	Remaining buildings of 20th century religious settlement
LaBelle Heritage Museum		LaBelle	Hendry	Southwest	Local history	
Lady Lake Historical Society Museum		Lady Lake	Lake	Central	Local history	Exhibits include area citrus industry, a miniature HO gauge railroad, antique furniture, tools, photographs and memorabilia
Lake City-Columbia County Historical Museum		Lake City	Columbia	North Central	Local history	website
Lake County Historical Museum		Tavares	Lake	Central	Local history	
Lake County Museum of Art		Eustis	Lake	Central	Art	
Lake Kissimmee State Park - Cow Camp		Lake Wales	Polk	Central	Living	1876 period cow camp on weekends from Oct. through May 1
Lake Mary Historical Museum		Lake Mary	Seminole	Central	Local history	
Lake Wales Museum and Cultural Center		Lake Wales	Polk	Central	Local history	Located in a depot, includes a model railroad layout
Lake Worth Historical Museum		Lake Worth	Palm Beach	Southeast	Local history	Includes historic photos, maps, clothing, household items, area ethnic culture
Larimer Arts Center		Palatka	Putnam	Northeast	Art	Art center with gallery
LaVilla Museum		Jacksonville	Duval	Northeast	Ethnic-African American	
Leepa-Rattner Museum of Art		Tarpon Springs	Pinellas	Central West	Art	Part of St. Petersburg College, includes many works by Abraham Rattner and other 20th century artists
Leesburg Heritage Museum		Leesburg	Lake	Central	Local history	
LeMoyne Center for the Visual Arts		Tallahassee	Leon	North Central	Art	website, includes sculpture garden and exhibit galleries
Lewis and Lucretia Taylor House Museum of African-American History and Culture		Tallahassee	Leon	North Central	Ethnic-African American	Also known as the Taylor House Museum, history of the black community in Tallahassee and civil rights
Liberty Bell Memorial Museum		Melbourne	Brevard	Central East	History	Houses military war exhibits, facsimiles of important documents in U.S. history & a full size replica of the Liberty Bell.
Lighthouse ArtCenter		Jupiter	Palm Beach	Southeast	Art	website, museum, gallery and school of art
Lightner Museum		St. Augustine	St. Johns	Northeast	Multiple	Victorian decorative arts, natural history artifacts, antique steam engines, musical instruments, paintings, sculpture, and furniture
Loggerhead Marinelife Center		Juno Beach	Palm Beach	Southeast	Natural history	Rescue and education center for sea turtles
Lowe Art Museum		Coral Gables	Miami-Dade	Southeast	Art	Part of University of Miami, collection includes Greco-Roman antiquities, Renaissance, Baroque, 17th- and 19th-century European art, 19th-century American art, modern art, international works, glass
Lyons Maritime Museum		St. Augustine	St. Johns	Northeast	Maritime	Diving equipment and history
Madame Tussauds Orlando		Orlando	Orange	Central	Wax	
Maitland Art Center		Maitland	Orange	Central	Art	Includes exhibit gallery
Maitland Historical Museum		Maitland	Orange	Central	Local history	Operated by the Maitland Historical Society, area pioneers
Maitland Telephone Museum		Maitland	Orange	Central	Technology	Operated by the Maitland Historical Society, development of the Winter Park Telephone Company and the technological growth of Maitland
Man in the Sea Museum		Panama City	Bay	Northwest	Maritime	History of underwater diving
Manatee County Agricultural Museum		Palmetto	Manatee	Southwest	Agriculture	Part of Palmetto Historical Park
Manatee Village Historical Park		Bradenton	Manatee	Southwest	Open air	Includes 1903 Wiggins General Store, boatworks, 1912 Florida pioneer farmhouse, smokehouse and sugar cane mill, barn, church, school, courthouse, Cow Hunter's bunkhouse, steam engine
Mandarin Museum		Jacksonville	Duval	Northeast	Historic house	Located in Walter Jones Historical Park, turn-of-the-20th-century period farmhouse
Marco Island Historical Museum		Marco Island, Florida	Collier	Southwest	Local history	Part of the Collier County Museum System, history of the Calusa Indians and the development of Marco Island
Marine Science Center		Ponce Inlet	Volusia	Central East	Natural history	Aquariums, touch tanks, rehabilitated seabirds and sea turtles
Marion County Museum of History		Ocala	Marion	Central	Local history	
Maritime & Yachting Museum		Stuart	Martin	Central East	Maritime	Includes antique and classic boats, engines, model ships, navigation equipment, paintings and photographs
Marjorie Kinnan Rawlings Historic State Park		Cross Creek	Alachua	North Central	Farm	Working farm of author Marjorie Kinnan Rawlings
Mary Brogan Museum of Art and Science		Tallahassee	Leon	North Central	Multiple	Science and art, with collections in American Folk art, photography, sculpture, paintings and drawings, prints, and Pre-Columbian art
Mary McLeod Bethune Home		Daytona Beach	Volusia	Central East	Historic house	Home of Mary McLeod Bethune, an educator and civil rights leader
Matheson Museum		Gainesville	Alachua	North Central	Multiple	Includes the local history museum, the historic Matheson House, and the Tison Tool Museum, operated by the Alachua County Historic Trust
Mattie Kelly Arts Center		Niceville	Okaloosa	Northwest	Art	Performing art center with exhibit gallery, part of Northwest Florida State College
McLarty Treasure Museum		Vero Beach	Indian River	Central East	Maritime	Exhibits on the 1715 Spanish treasure fleet
MDC Museum of Art and Design		Miami	Miami-Dade	Southeast	Art	website, operated by Miami Dade College, located in the Freedom Tower
Mel Fisher Maritime Heritage Museum		Key West	Monroe	Florida Keys	Maritime	
Mel Fisher's Treasure Museum		Sebastian	Indian River	Central East	Maritime	Shipwreck finds
Mennello Museum of American Art		Orlando	Orange	Central	Art	American art including traditional and contemporary art, features collection of primitive art by Earl Cunningham
Merrill House Museum		Jacksonville	Duval	Northeast	Historic house	Victorian-era house, operated by the Jacksonville Historical Society
Miami Children's Museum		Miami	Miami-Dade	Southeast	Children's	
Miami-Dade Military Museum		Miami	Miami-Dade	Southeast	Military	
Micanopy Historical Society Museum		Micanopy	Alachua	North Central	Local history	
Middleburg Historical Museum		Middleburg	Clay	Northeast	Local history	
Military Heritage & Aviation Museum		Punta Gorda	Charlotte	Southwest	Military	
Military Museum of North Florida		Green Cove Springs	Clay	Northeast	Military	Includes ship models, military vehicles, uniforms, weapons, equipment, flags
Military Sea Services Museum		Sebring	Highlands	Central	Military	
Mission San Luis		Tallahassee	Leon	North Central	Living	Recreated Colonial Spanish mission village, with Apalachee village, the council house, and the home of the Spanish Deputy Governor
Monticello Old Jail Museum		Monticello	Jefferson	Northwest	Prison	Facebook site, former jail with prison cells, displays of local history
Moore Memorial Park and Cultural Center		Mims	Brevard	Central East	Ethnic-African American	Former home of civil rights leader Harry T. Moore and his wife Harriette Moore, an educator and civil rights worker
Morean Arts Center		St. Petersburg	Pinellas	Central West	Art	Displays works by local, national and international artists
Morikami Museum and Japanese Gardens		Delray Beach	Palm Beach	Southeast	Ethnic-Japanese	Japanese art and culture
Morningside Nature Center		Gainesville	Alachua	North Central	Farm	Weekend living history programs, working farm and nature programs
Morse Museum		Winter Park	Orange	Central	Art	Also known as the Charles Hosmer Morse Museum of American Art, American decorative arts including works by Tiffany, American art pottery, late-19th and early-20th-century American paintings, graphics, decorative arts and the Tiffany Chapel
Mote-Morris House		Leesburg	Lake	Central	Historic house	Victorian house, open twice a month
Mound House		Fort Myers Beach	Lee	Southwest	Local history	website, tours of an ancient Calusa Indian Mound, exhibits of archaeology, history and natural history, 1920s house under restoration
Mount Dora Center for the Arts		Mount Dora	Lake	Central	Art	
Mount Dora History Museum		Mount Dora	Lake	Central	Local history	Formerly the Royellou Museum, contains vintage artifacts housed in the Old City Jail
Mount Dora Museum of Speed		Mount Dora	Lake	Central	Automotive	Includes muscle cars, automobile memorabilia, vintage road signs, Americana collection
Mulberry Phosphate Museum		Mulberry	Polk	Central	Multiple	Includes fossils, area memorabilia and exhibits about the phosphate industry
Museum at Ragtops Motorcars		Palm Beach	Palm Beach	Southeast	Automotive	website, vintage automobiles and memorabilia
Museum of Art Fort Lauderdale		Fort Lauderdale	Broward	Southeast	Art	Contemporary, southeastern Florida and Caribbean art
Museum of Arts and Sciences		Daytona Beach	Volusia	Central East	Multiple	Also called MOAS, includes art, science, Americana, historic house museums, a children's museum, Cuban Museum gallery
Museum of Contemporary Art		North Miami	Miami-Dade	Southeast	Art	
Museum of Contemporary Art Jacksonville		Jacksonville	Duval	Northeast	Art	Also known as MOCA Jacksonville
Museum of Dinosaurs and Ancient Cultures		Cocoa Beach	Brevard	Central	Natural history	Dinosaur dioramas, fossils, artifacts and dioramas of ancient Egypt, China and Mesoamerica
Museum of Discovery and Science		Fort Lauderdale	Broward	Southeast	Science	
Museum of Lifestyle & Fashion History			Palm Beach	Southeast	Fashion	Currently seeking permanent location, exhibits of fashion, Barbie dolls, design
Museum of Fine Arts		St. Petersburg	Pinellas	Central West	Art	Collections include European and American art, photography, Greek and Roman antiquities, pre-Columbian and Asian art
Museum of Florida Art		DeLand	Volusia	Central East	Art	Formerly the DeLand Museum of Art, focus is Florida art
Museum of Florida Art and Culture		Avon Park	Highlands	Central	Art	Part of South Florida Community College, includes art, archaeology, and Florida history exhibits
Museum of Florida History		Tallahassee	Leon	North Central	History	The official history Museum of the State of Florida. Website.
Museum of Geneva History		Geneva	Seminole	Central East	Local history	Operated by the Geneva Historical & Genealogical Society
Museum of Local History		Milton	Santa Rosa	Northwest	Local history	
Museum of Miami		Miami	Miami-Dade	Southeast	History	History of southeastern Florida, including Greater Miami, the Florida Keys and the Everglades; formerly known as HistoryMiami Museum
Museum of Polo & Hall of Fame		Lake Worth	Palm Beach	Southeast	Sports	History of polo
Museum of Science & History		Jacksonville	Duval	Northeast	Multiple	Science, natural history, history of Northeast Florida, planetarium
Museum of Science and Industry		Tampa	Hillsborough	Central West	Science	Exhibits on science, weather, health
Museum of Seminole County History		Sanford	Seminole	Central	Local history	
Museum of Southern History		Jacksonville	Duval	Northeast	History	Also called G. Howard Bryan Museum of Southern History, lifestyle and culture of the antebellum American South
Museum of the Americas		Doral	Miami-Dade	Southeast	Art	website, contemporary art
Museum of the American Arts & Crafts Movement		St. Petersburg	Pinellas	Central West	Art	Collection of fine and decorative arts from the American Arts and Crafts Movement. website
Museum of the Apopkans		Apopka	Orange	Central	Local history	
Museum of the City of Lake Worth		Lake Worth	Palm Beach	Southeast	Local history	
Museum of the Everglades		Everglades City	Collier	Southwest	Local history	Part of the Collier County Museum System, dedicated to the building of the Tamiami Trail and the founding of Everglades City
Museum of the Glades		Belle Glade	Palm Beach	Southeast	Local history	Includes artifacts of the Belle Glade culture, pioneer and area history
Museum of the Islands		Pine Island Center	Lee	Southwest	Local history	Exhibits include shells, dolls, household items, fishing artifacts
My Jewish Discovery Place Children's Museum		Plantation	Broward	Southeast	Ethnic-Jewish	website, hands-on, interactive museum of Jewish culture, history and values
Naples Depot Museum		Naples	Collier	Southwest	Transportation	Part of the Collier County Museum System, exhibits describe how technology and transportation were used to found the City of Naples
The Baker Museum		Naples	Collier	Southwest	Art	Includes American modernism, 20th-century Mexican art, sculpture and 3-dimensional art
Nathan H. Wilson Center for the Arts		Jacksonville	Duval	Northeast	Art	website, part of Florida State College at Jacksonville, South campus, includes an art gallery
National Armed Services & Law Enforcement Memorial Museum		Dunedin	Pinellas	Central West	Law enforcement	website
National Museum of Naval Aviation		Pensacola	Escambia	Northwest	Aviation	History of naval aviation
National Navy UDT-SEAL Museum		Fort Pierce	St. Lucie	Central East	Military	History of the Navy Underwater Demolition Teams (UDT) and Sea, Air, Land (SEAL) Teams
New Smyrna Museum of History		New Smyrna Beach	Volusia	Central East	Local history	
Norman Studios Silent Film Museum		Jacksonville	Duval	Northeast	Cinema	Historic film studio that made films starring African-American actors in non-stereotypic roles
North Brevard Historical Museum		Titusville	Brevard	Central East	Local history	
North Gallery		Miami	Miami-Dade	Southeast	Art	At North Campus, Miami Dade College
North Pinellas Historical Museum		Palm Harbor	Pinellas	Central West	Local history	History of the Palm Harbor, Crystal Beach, and the Ozona and Curlew communities
Norton Museum of Art		West Palm Beach	Palm Beach	Southeast	Art	Collections include European, American, and Chinese art, contemporary art and photography
Old Courthouse Heritage Museum		Inverness	Citrus	Central West	Local history	
Old Davie School Museum		Davie	Broward	Southeast	Local history	
Old Deerfield School		Deerfield Beach	Broward	Southeast	Local history	
Old Dillard Museum		Fort Lauderdale	Broward	Southeast	Ethnic-African American	
Old Florida Museum		St. Augustine	St. Johns	Northeast	History	Hands-on programs with daily living activities from pre-European times to 20th century
Old Jail Museum		St. Augustine	St. Johns	Northeast	Local history	Also known as Florida Heritage Museum
Old Town Hall History Center		Melbourne Beach	Brevard	Central East	Local history	
Oldest House Museum		Key West	Monroe	Florida Keys	Historic house	website, operated by the Old Island Restoration Foundation, 1829 house with original furnishings, ship models, maritime artifacts, items recovered from Keys waters
Oldest House Museum Complex		St. Augustine	St. Johns	Northeast	Local history	Operated by the St. Augustine Historical Society, includes the Gonzalez-Alvarez House, the Manucy Museum of local history, and the Edwards Gallery with changing exhibits
Oldest Store Museum		St. Augustine	St. Johns	Northeast	History	Historic general store with early 20th-century items and re-enactors
Oldest Wooden Schoolhouse		St. Augustine	St. Johns	Northeast	Education	1807 period schoolhouse
Olustee Battlefield Historic State Park		Olustee	Baker	Northeast	Local history	American Civil War battlefield and visitor center museum
Orange County Regional History Center		Orlando	Orange	Central	Local history	
Orlando Auto Museum (Dezerland Park Orlando)		Orlando	Orange	Central	Automotive	Museum with over 2,000 vehicles
Orlando Fire Museum		Orlando	Orange	Central	Firefighting	website, located in a historic firehouse
Orlando Museum of Art		Orlando	Orange	Central	Art	
Orlando Science Center		Orlando	Orange	Central	Science	
Orman House		Apalachicola	Franklin	Northwest	Historic house	1838 antebellum home
Ormond Memorial Art Museum and Gardens		Ormond Beach	Volusia	Central East	Art	Includes a botanical garden, features works by Malcolm Fraser
Osceola Center for the Arts		Kissimmee	Osceola	Central	Art	website
Osceola County Welcome Center and History Museum		Kissimmee	Osceola	Central	Open air	Includes the Osceola County Historical Society Museum with local history exhibits, and the Pioneer Village with the 1889 Ross Lanier House (1889), one-room schoolhouse, citrus packing house (1882), cow camp
Palm Beach Maritime Museum		Riviera Beach	Palm Beach	Southeast	Maritime	website, includes tours of the historic Coast Guard facility and a bomb shelter on Peanut Island
Palm Beach Photographic Centre		West Palm Beach	Palm Beach	Southeast	Photography	Photography exhibits, education
Palm Cottage		Naples	Collier	Southwest	Historic house	Early 20th century period house and gardens
Palmetto Historical Park		Palmetto	Manatee	Southwest	Open air	Includes local history museum, agriculture museum, cottage museum with antiques and dolls, church, school, post office
Panama City Center for the Arts		Panama City	Bay	Northwest	Art	Hosts shows of fine art, sculpture, jewelry and ceramics
Panhandle Pioneer Settlement		Blountstown	Calhoun	Northwest	Living	website, recreates an early agricultural community with a pioneer settlement and a farmstead
Pasco Arts Center		Holiday	Pasco	Central West	Art	Art exhibits, classes and workshops
Paynes Creek Historic State Park		Bowling Green	Hardee	Central	History	Frontier trading post site, exhibits about Seminoles, the trading post, frontier fort and pioneers
Pena-Peck House		St. Augustine	St. Johns	Northeast	Historic house	website, operated by the St. Augustine Woman's Exchange, 18th-century Spanish Colonial house
Pensacola Lighthouse & Museum		Pensacola	Escambia	Northwest	Maritime	
Pensacola Museum of Art		Pensacola	Escambia	Northwest	Art	Includes 20th century and contemporary art, glass and African tribal art
Pérez Art Museum Miami		Miami	Miami-Dade	Southeast	Art	Contemporary art, formerly the Miami Art Museum
Phillip and Patricia Frost Museum of Science		Miami	Miami-Dade	Southeast	Science	Science and natural history, formerly the Miami Science Museum
Pioneer Florida Museum and Village		Dade City	Pasco	Central West	Open air	Includes Overstreet House, a one-room schoolhouse, church, depot, a train engine, and museum with tools, household items and antiques
Pioneer Heritage Museums		Plant City	Hillsborough	Central West	Local history	website, East Hillsborough Historical Society Facebook site
Pioneer Settlement for the Creative Arts		Barberville	Volusia	Central East	Open air	Late 19th and early 20th century buildings and trades
Plantation Historical Museum		Plantation	Broward	Southeast	Local history	website, adjacent to the town's botanical park and arboretum
Plumb House Museum		Clearwater	Pinellas	Central West	Local history	
Polk State College Fine Arts Gallery		Winter Haven	Polk	Central	Art	Part of Polk State College
Polk County Historical Museum		Bartow	Polk	Central	Local history	Located in the Old Polk County Courthouse
Polk County Nature Discovery Center		Lakeland	Polk	Central	Natural history	Polk County's water, wilderness and wildlife, hands-on exhibits, live aquatic plans and animals in aquariums
Polk Museum of Art		Lakeland	Polk	Central	Art	Includes, African, Asian, Pre-Columbian and contemporary art, European and American decorative arts
Ponce de Leon Inlet Light		Ponce Inlet	Volusia	Central East	Maritime	Lighthouse and museum
Port Boca Grande Lighthouse & Museum		Boca Grande	Lee	Southwest	Local & Natural History	Active lighthouse & museum, managed & operated by Barrier Island Parks Society (BIPS)
Potter's Wax Museum		St. Augustine	St. Johns	Northeast	Miscellaneous	Over 160 wax sculptures covering a wide range of real & fictitious figures.
Presidents Hall of Fame		Clermont	Lake	Central	Wax	website, next to the Florida Citrus Tower, wax figures of U.S. presidents, authentic miniature replicas of rooms in the White House, and other representations of Americana
Punta Gorda Historical Museum		Punta Gorda	Charlotte	Southwest	Local history	Operated by the Punta Gorda Historical Society in the A. C. Freeman House
Putnam Historic Museum		Palatka	Putnam	Northeast	Local history	website, information, operated by the Putnam County Historical Society
Railroad Museum of South Florida		Fort Myers	Lee	Southwest	Railroad	website, located in Lakes Regional Park
Randall Knife Museum		Orlando	Orange	Central	Knives	Displays of custom made knives.
Raney House Museum		Apalachicola	Franklin	Northwest	Historic house	19th century period house
Ransom Arts Center		St. Petersburg	Pinellas	Central West	Art	website, Cobb and Elliott Galleries, part of Eckerd College
Ringling College of Art and Design Galleries		Sarasota	Sarasota	Southwest	Art	website, part of Ringling College of Art and Design, includes the Selby, Crossley, Goldstein and Hammond Commons galleries
Ringling Museum of Art		Sarasota	Sarasota	Southwest	Multiple	Formally called The John and Mable Ringling Museum of Art, includes European paintings, Cypriot antiquities and Asian, American, and contemporary art, decorative arts, Ringling's mansion, and a circus museum
Ripley's Believe It or Not! Museum		St. Augustine	St. Johns	Northeast	Miscellaneous	Home of Ripley's personal collections located in Castle Warden, a Moorish Revival style mansion built in 1887.
Rookery Bay National Estuarine Research Reserve		Naples	Collier	Southwest	Natural history	Natural and cultural history of the reserve
Retro Gaming Museum, LLC		Cocoa	Brevard	Central East	Retro Gaming	72+ Exabits Photos, Art Interactive Exabits
Rosemary Duffy Larson Gallery, Broward College		Davie	Broward	Southeast	Art	website, part of Broward College (A. Hugh Adams Campus)
Rubell Museum		Miami	Miami-Dade	Southeast	Art	website, contemporary art
Ruth Funk Center for Textile Arts		Melbourne	Brevard	Central East	Art	Part of Florida Institute of Technology; textiles, clothing and accessories
Safety Harbor Museum and Cultural Center		Safety Harbor	Pinellas	Central West	Local history	website, city and regional history
Safford House Museum		Tarpon Springs	Pinellas	Central West	Historic house	Late 19th century Victorian house
Salvador Dalí Museum		St. Petersburg	Pinellas	Central West	Art	Art by Salvador Dalí, including oil paintings, watercolors and drawings, graphics, photographs, sculptures and objets d'art
Samuel Baker House		Holiday	Pasco	Central West	Historic house	Late 19th-century house, operated by the West Pasco Historical Society
Samuel P. Harn Museum of Art		Gainesville	Alachua	North Central	Art	Part of the University of Florida, includes Asian, African, modern and contemporary art, photography
San Carlos Institute		Key West	Monroe	Florida Keys	Ethnic-Cuban	Cuba's history and the history of the Cuban-American community in Florida
San Marcos de Apalache Historic State Park		St. Marks	Wakulla	North Central	Military	History of the 17th-century fort and excavated items
Sandoway Discovery Center		Delray Beach	Palm Beach	Southeast	Natural history	Exhibits include a large shell collection, local natural and cultural history, tortoises and turtles, live animals and marine creatures
Sanford Museum		Sanford	Seminole	Central	Local history	website
Sarasota Classic Car Museum		Sarasota	Sarasota	Southwest	Automotive	
Scarfone/Hartley Gallery		Tampa	Hillsborough	Central West	Art	website at University of Tampa
Schoolhouse Children's Museum		Boynton Beach	Palm Beach	Southeast	Children's	
Science Center of Pinellas County		St. Petersburg	Pinellas	Central West	Science	Science, natural history, African-American scientists and inventors, live animals, replica 16th Century Native American village, observatory, planetarium
Science and Discovery Center of Northwest Florida		Panama City	Bay	Northwest	Children's	Formerly the Junior Museum of Bay County, hands-on science and natural history exhibits, children's discovery areas, trail
Sebastian Fishing Museum		Melbourne Beach	Brevard	Central East	Maritime	Part of Sebastian Inlet State Park, area fishing industry
Seminole County Public Schools Student Museum		Sanford	Seminole	Central	Local history	
Silver River Museum and Environmental Center		Ocala	Marion	Central	Multiple	Area natural and cultural history, late 19th century pioneer village
Skeletons: Museum of Osteology		Orlando	Orange	Central	Natural history	website, over 450 animal skeletons creatively posed and in dioramas
Society of the Four Arts Galleries		Palm Beach	Palm Beach	Southeast	Art	Includes the Esther B. O'Keeffe Art Gallery and the Mary Alice Fortin Children's Art Gallery
South Florida Museum		Bradenton	Manatee	Southwest	Natural history	Natural and cultural history of Florida's gulf coast, includes the Bishop Planetarium and Parker Manatee Aquarium
South Florida Railway Museum		Deerfield Beach	Broward	Southeast	Railroad	Includes model train layouts, railroad artifacts
South Florida Science Center and Aquarium		West Palm Beach	Palm Beach	Southeast	Science	Includes a planetarium and aquarium
South Gallery at Broward Community College		Pembroke Pines	Broward	Southeast	Art	website, at Broward Community College South Campus
Southeast Museum of Photography		Daytona Beach	Volusia	Central East	Art	Photography
Southeastern Regional Black Archives Research Center and Museum		Tallahassee	Leon	North Central	Ethnic-African American	African American history in Florida, also a branch located in the Union Bank
Southwest Florida Museum of History		Fort Myers	Lee	Southwest	Local history	Exhibits include Paleo Indians, the Calusa, the Seminoles, Spanish explorers and early settlers, cattlemen, military and agriculture, boating and fishing industries; period antiques and decorative arts; a pioneer "cracker" house, 1926 La France fire pumper, and 1929 private Pullman rail car
Spady Cultural Heritage Museum		Delray Beach	Palm Beach	Southeast	Ethnic-African American	African American history, culture and heritage in Florida
Spanish Military Hospital Museum		St. Augustine	St. Johns	Northeast	Medical	Military hospital life in 1791
Spongeorama		Tarpon Springs	Pinellas	Central West	Maritime	Sponge diving & harvesting in Gulf of Mexico
St. Augustine Lighthouse & Maritime Museum		St. Augustine	St. Johns	Northeast	Maritime	On an historic light station, the non-profit museum includes an 1876 lighthouse tower, keepers' house, WWII era restorations, and a maritime museum with shipwreck artifacts discovered via an in-house scientific diving program. Shares the stories of the maritime history of the oldest continually occupied port city in the fifty states. The aid-to-navigation is privately owned and operated by the Museum which is accredited by the American Alliance of Museums.
St. Augustine Pirate & Treasure Museum		St. Augustine	St. Johns	Northeast	Maritime	Pirate artifacts, formerly the Pirate Soul Museum in Key West
St. Cloud Heritage Museum		St. Cloud	Osceola	Central	Local history	Photographs, documents and artifacts of local history and culture, operated by the Woman's Club of St. Cloud
St. Lucie County Regional History Center		Fort Pierce	St. Lucie	Central East	Local history	
St. Petersburg Museum of History		St. Petersburg	Pinellas	Central West	Local history	
St. Photios Greek Orthodox National Shrine		St. Augustine	St. Johns	Northeast	Religious	Site of first Greek settlement in America
Stephen Foster Folk Culture Center State Park		White Springs	Hamilton	North Central	Biographical	Museum about composer Stephen Foster and carillon tower that plays his songs
Stranahan House		Fort Lauderdale	Broward	Southeast	Historic house	1913 period house
Stuart Heritage Museum		Stuart	Martin	Central East	Local history	Housed in a former feed supply store
Sulphur Springs Museum and Heritage Center		Tampa	Hillsborough	Central West	Local history	
Suwannee County Historical Museum		Live Oak	Suwanee	North Central	Local history	Housed in a former railroad depot
Pensacola Museum of History		Pensacola	Escambia	Northwest	Multiple	Part of Historic Pensacola Village, includes historic artifacts, Americana, West Florida history, period store displays, antique transportation, antiques
Tallahassee Automobile Museum		Tallahassee	Leon	North Central	Automotive	Historic cars, toy cars, pedal cars, antique boating items, golf memorabilia, motors, cash registers, clocks, bicycles, sports memorabilia, motorcycles, can openers, spark plugs, artifacts
Tallahassee Museum		Tallahassee	Leon	North Central	Multiple	Includes an open air section with an 1890s school, a 1937 church, and three buildings of the mid-19th century Bellevue Plantation, a living history farm, live wildlife, a children's discovery center, a display gallery for art and cultural exhibits, and trails
Tampa Baseball Museum		Tampa	Hillsborough	Central West	Sports	Former home of Al López, honors the lives of 89 professional players
Tampa Bay Automobile Museum		Pinellas Park	Pinellas	Central West	Automotive	Historic automobiles from the 20th century
Tampa Bay History Center		Tampa	Hillsborough	Central West	Local history	Covers 12,000 years of Florida history with a special focus on Tampa Bay and the Gulf Coast
Tampa Firefighters Museum		Tampa	Hillsborough	Central West	Firefighting	website
Tampa Museum of Art		Tampa	Hillsborough	Central West	Art	Collections include 20th-century fine art, Greek, Roman, and Etruscan antiquities
Tarpon Springs Cultural Center		Tarpon Springs	Pinellas	Central West	Art	Changing art and sculpture exhibits
Tarpon Springs Heritage Museum		Tarpon Springs	Pinellas	Central West	Local history	website, area's sponge diving, Native Americans, Greek immigrants and local area history
Ted Williams Museum and Hitters Hall of Fame		St. Petersburg	Pinellas	Central West	Sports	Located in Tropicana Field, baseball and Ted Williams history and memorabilia
Thomas Center		Gainesville	Alachua	North Central	Multiple	Changing art exhibits, local history and 1920s period hotel rooms
Titanic The Experience		Orlando	Orange	Central	Maritime	website, includes re-creations of actual rooms from the ship RMS Titanic, artifacts, and movie memorabilia
Torreya State Park - Gregory House		Bristol	Liberty	Northwest	Historic house	1840s plantation house
Treasures of Madison County		Madison	Madison	North Central	Local history	Area history and culture
Tree Hill Nature Center		Jacksonville	Duval	Northeast	Natural history	Features live animals, wildlife sanctuary
Truman Little White House		Key West	Monroe	Florida Keys	Historic house	Winter White House for President Harry S. Truman
Umatilla Historical Museum		Umatilla	Lake	Central	Local history	Located in the Paul W. Bryan Historic Schoolhouse
UNF Gallery of Art		Jacksonville	Duval	Northeast	Art	website, part of University of North Florida
University Galleries, University of Florida		Gainesville	Alachua	North Central	Art	website, part of the University of Florida
University of Central Florida Art Gallery		Orlando	Orange	Central	Art	website, part of the University of Central Florida
University of South Florida Contemporary Art Museum		Tampa	Hillsborough	Central West	Art	Part of the University of South Florida, contemporary art including graphics and sculpture
University of West Florida Art Gallery		Pensacola	Escambia	Northwest	Art	website, part of University of West Florida
USCGC INGHAM Maritime Museum		Key West	Monroe	Florida Keys	Maritime	United States Coast Guard Cutter and memorial to guardians killed in action in World War II and Vietnam
USS Mohawk CGC Memorial Museum		Key West	Monroe	Florida Keys	Maritime	World War II US Coast Guard cutter museum ship
Valiant Air Command Warbird Museum		Titusville	Brevard	Central East	Aviation	Fixed and rotary wing military aircraft from World War I to the present
Venice Art Center		Venice	Sarasota	Southwest	Art	web
Vernon Historical Society Museum		Vernon	Washington	Northwest	Local history	Photographs, people, tools
Vero Beach Museum of Art		Vero Beach	Indian River	Central East	Art	Art from the early 20th century to the present in a broad range of media
Villa Zorayda		St. Augustine	St. Johns	Northeast	Historic house	Scaled-down version of the 12th-century Moorish Alhambra Palace in Granada, Spain
Vizcaya Museum and Gardens		Miami	Miami-Dade	Southeast	Historic house	70 room estate with 15th through early 19th century furnishings and European decorative art, also botanical gardens
Von Liebig Art Center		Naples	Collier	Southwest	Art	website, operated by the Naples Art Association, contemporary art
Walton County Heritage Museum		DeFuniak Springs	Walton	Northwest	Local history	
Washington County Historical Museum		Chipley	Washington	Northwest	Local history	Operated by the Washington County Historical Society in a former train depot
Waterhouse Residence and Carpentry Shop Museums		Maitland	Orange	Central	Historic house	Victoria era family home and adjacent carpentry shop, operated by the Maitland Historic Society
Weedon Island Preserve Cultural and Natural History Center		St. Petersburg	Pinellas	Central West	Multiple	Native Americans, natural history, art and local history
Wells'Built Museum		Orlando	Orange	Central	Ethnic-African American	
West Florida Railroad Museum		Milton	Santa Rosa	Northwest	Railroad	Railroad cars and memorabilia from the L & N, Frisco and other railroads
West Pasco Historical Society Museum and Library		New Port Richey	Pasco	Central West	Local history	Exhibits include Native American arrowhead and artifacts, clothing, household items, antiques and decorative items, tools, and historic photographs
Wings of Dreams Aviation Museum		Starke	Clay	Northeast	Aviation	Located at Keystone Heights Airport
Wings Over Miami Museum		Miami	Miami-Dade	Southeast	Aviation	Located at Kendall-Tamiami Executive Airport, historic flying aircraft
Winter Garden Heritage Museum		Winter Garden	Orange	Central	Local history	Exhibits include local citrus labels, Native American artifacts, railroad memorabilia
Winter Park History Museum		Winter Park	Orange	Central	Local history	Operated by the Winter Park Historical Association
Wizard of Oz Museum		Cape Canaveral	Brevard	Central East	Culture	Features a large collection of over 3,000 Wizard of Oz artifacts and memorabilia, including the first known published copy of the original book.
Wolfsonian-FIU		Miami	Miami-Dade	Southeast	Art	Part of Florida International University, late-19th and early-20th century design
WonderWorks		Orlando	Orange	Central	Science	Interactive hands-on science exhibits
WonderWorks		Panama City	Bay	Northwest	Science	Interactive hands-on science exhibits
World Erotic Art Museum		Miami	Miami-Dade	Southeast	Art	Includes art, sculpture, tapestries and artifacts of erotic art
World Golf Hall of Fame		St. Augustine	St. Johns	Northeast	Sports	
Ximenez-Fatio House		St. Augustine	St. Johns	Northeast	Historic house	19th century territorial and early statehood period life
Ybor City Museum State Park		Tampa	Hillsborough	Central West	Local history	History of the local cigar industry and the immigrant communities there from the 1880s through the 1930s
Yesteryear Village		West Palm Beach	Palm Beach	Southeast	Open air	Heritage park at the South Florida Fair, includes a school, farm, blacksmith shop, general store, several historic houses, and the Sally Bennett Big Band Hall of Fame Museum
Young at Art Museum		Davie	Broward	Southeast	Children's	Early childhood development through exhibits and activities in art, culture, the environment
Zephyrhills Depot Museum		Zephyrhills	Pasco	Central West	Local history	Includes local history, railroad history and memorabilia
Zephyrhills Museum of Military History		Zephyrhills	Pasco	Central West	Military	website, World War II memorabilia, located in a World War II barracks building for the former Zephyrhills Army Airfield
Zora Neale Hurston National Museum of Fine Arts		Eatonville	Orange	Central	Art	Also known as The Hurston, work of artists of African descent, including Zora Neale Hurston

== Defunct museums ==
- Armed Forces History Museum, Largo, closed on January 29, 2017, displays included World War I, Japanese memorabilia associated with the World War II attack on Pearl Harbor, USMC in the South Pacific, D-Day landings, German Third Reich, Korean War and 8063rd M.A.S.H memorabilia.
- Burt Reynolds and Friends Museum, Jupiter
- Civil War Soldiers Museum, Pensacola
- Children's Science Center N. Ft. Myers. Closed in 2005.
- Cuban Museum of Arts and Culture, Miami
- Dinosaur Wildlife, Spring Hill, open from 1962 to 1998
- Dow Museum of Historic Houses, |St. Augustine, closed in 2014 and turned into a bed-and-breakfast complex
- Florida International Museum at St. Petersburg College, St. Petersburg, closed in 2010
- Florida Military Aviation Museum, St. Petersburg, closed in about 2007
- Flying Tigers Warbird Restoration Museum, Kissimmee, closed in 2004
- Fred Bear Museum, Gainesville, showcased archery & the contribution of Fred Bear, a man who popularized the sport, closed in 2003, current museum located in Springfield, Missouri
- Gulfcoast Wonder & Imagination Zone, The Hands-On Science Museum, Sarasota
- Gulf Coast Museum of Art, Largo, closed January 2009, collection now part of Florida International Museum at St. Petersburg College
- Klassix Auto Attraction, Daytona Beach, closed in 2003
- Hibel Museum of Art, Jupiter
- Jacksonville Maritime Museum, Jacksonville, Florida, included large scale models of ships from the Mayflower to present day vessels, paintings, photographs and maritime artifacts
- Longboat Key Center for the Arts, closed in May 2017
- Mark K. Wheeler Gallery, Fort Lauderdale, Gallery of the former Art Institute of Fort Lauderdale
- Museum of the Sea and Indian, Destin, destroyed by hurricane in 1995
- Museum of Weapons & Early American History, St. Augustine
- Panama Canal Museum Florida, Seminole, closed in 2012, collections transferred to the George A. Smathers Libraries at the University of Florida in Gainesville
- Skatelab, Atlantic Beach, closed in 2009, original store and museum in Simi Valley, California still open
- Teddy Bear Museum of Naples, Naples, closed in 2005
- Tom Gaskins Cypress Knee Museum, Palmdale, featured carved cypress knees, closed in 2000
- Tragedy in U.S. History Museum, St. Augustine, featured articles and memorabilia related to tragic events, closed in 1998
- Turtle Kraals Museum, Key West
- USS Requin, Tampa, now part of the Carnegie Science Center in Pittsburgh, Pennsylvania
- Welaka Maritime Museum, Welaka
- Wings of Freedom Aviation Museum, Florida, Dunnellon
- World Chess Hall of Fame and Sidney Samole Museum, moved to St. Louis, Missouri in 2011

== Planned museums ==
- Bay of Pigs Museum, Miami
- Holocaust Documentation & Education Center, Dania Beach
- John H. Fetterman Maritime Museum and Research Center, Pensacola, website
- Mark X. and E. Louise Benson Museum, Gulf Breeze, website
- Pulse Memorial and Museum, Orlando

== See also ==
- List of nature centers in Florida
- List of historical societies in Florida
