= Lyons Maritime Museum =

Diving history museum in St. Augustine, Florida

Lyons Maritime Museum is a diving history museum in St. Augustine, Florida, St. Johns County, Florida. The museum exhibits include diving equipment such as diving helmets, diving knives, lamps, flashlights, diving boots, sandals, and chest weights. It opened in 1990. The museum was created by Leon Lyons, author of Helmets of the Deep. The museum was moved into Mr. Lyons home.

== See also ==
- List of museums in Florida

== Links ==
- Official website
- Biography
