= Longboat Key Center for the Arts =

Coordinates: 27.4342°N 82.6817°W

Longboat Key Center for the Arts was an arts center at the Ringling College of Art and Design in Longboat Key, Manatee County, Florida. The Center included the Durante Gallery for changing exhibitions. Opened in 1952, it closed in May 2017.

Ringling College of Art and Design bought the center, which was struggling financially, in 2007. The center offered master classes, community art classes, studio space, concert and lectures.

In February 2017, it was announced that the center would be closing in May to be privately redeveloped into homes. The site has been sold to a developer who intends to build single family homes.

Ringling College of Art and Design and Longboat township had announced a joint project to build a new arts center with a tentative opening date of 2020. However, the joint project failed to materialize due to additional costs and ultimately COVID-19.

== See also ==
- List of museums in Florida
