= Panama City Center for the Arts =

Coordinates: 30°9′19.5″N 85°39′35.5″W

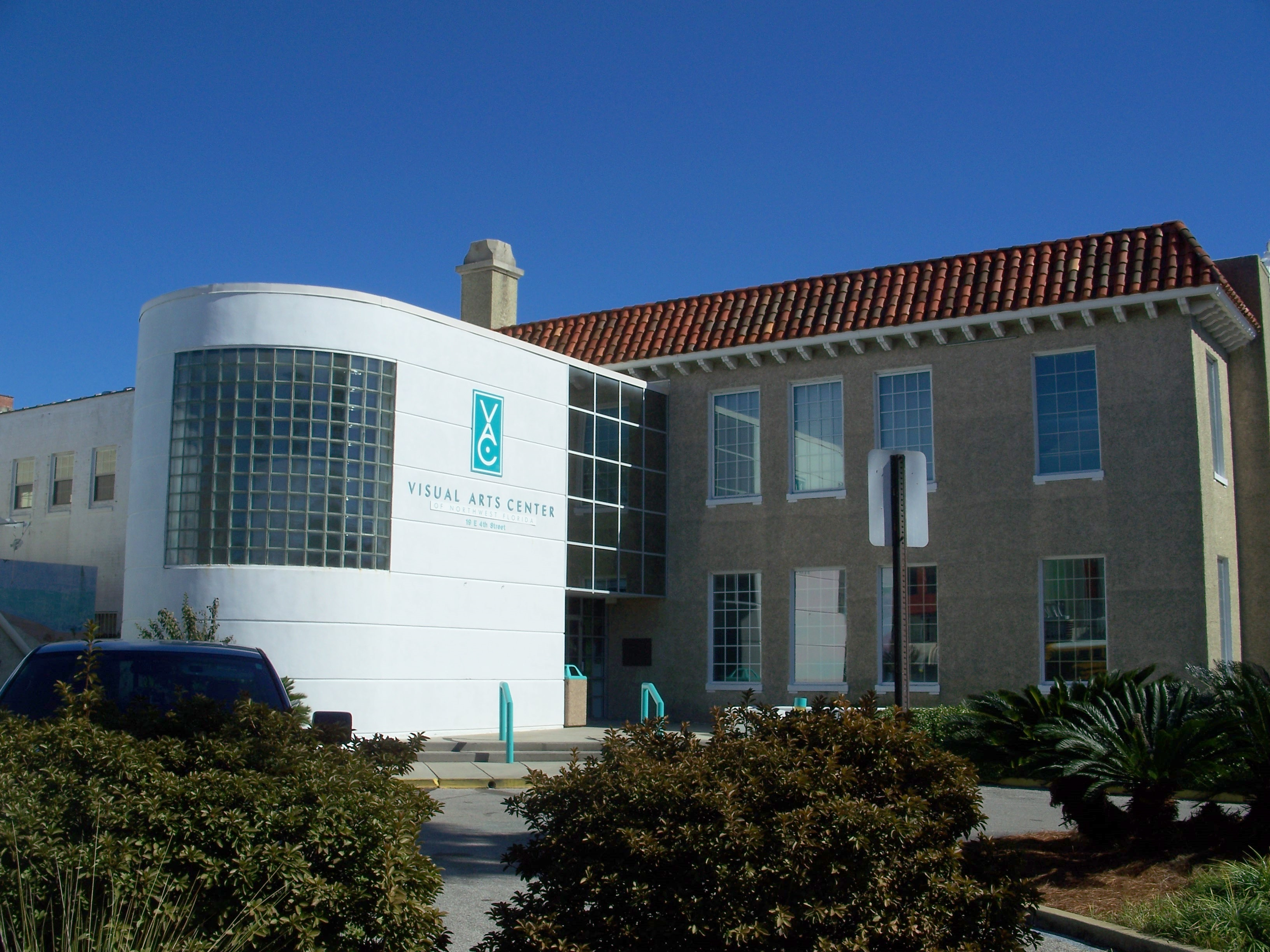
Panama City Center for the Arts

The Panama City Center for the Arts, formerly the Visual Arts Center of Northwest Florida, is an art center in Panama City, Florida. Its development was part of downtown revitalization efforts.

The Center has three galleries and hosts shows of fine art, sculpture, jewelry and ceramics, as well as music, film events, and classes. There is also a gift shop. The main gallery can be rented for private parties.

The Panama City Center for the Arts is located at 19 East 4th Street in historic downtown Panama City. The building was originally Panama City's first city hall.

The Center for the Arts is managed by Bay Arts Alliance, a local non-profit arts agency of Bay County, and is partly supported by the city.

== See also ==
- List of museums in Florida
