= Naval Air Station Richmond Headquarters Building =

Military museum in Miami, FL, US

- U.S. National Register of Historic Places
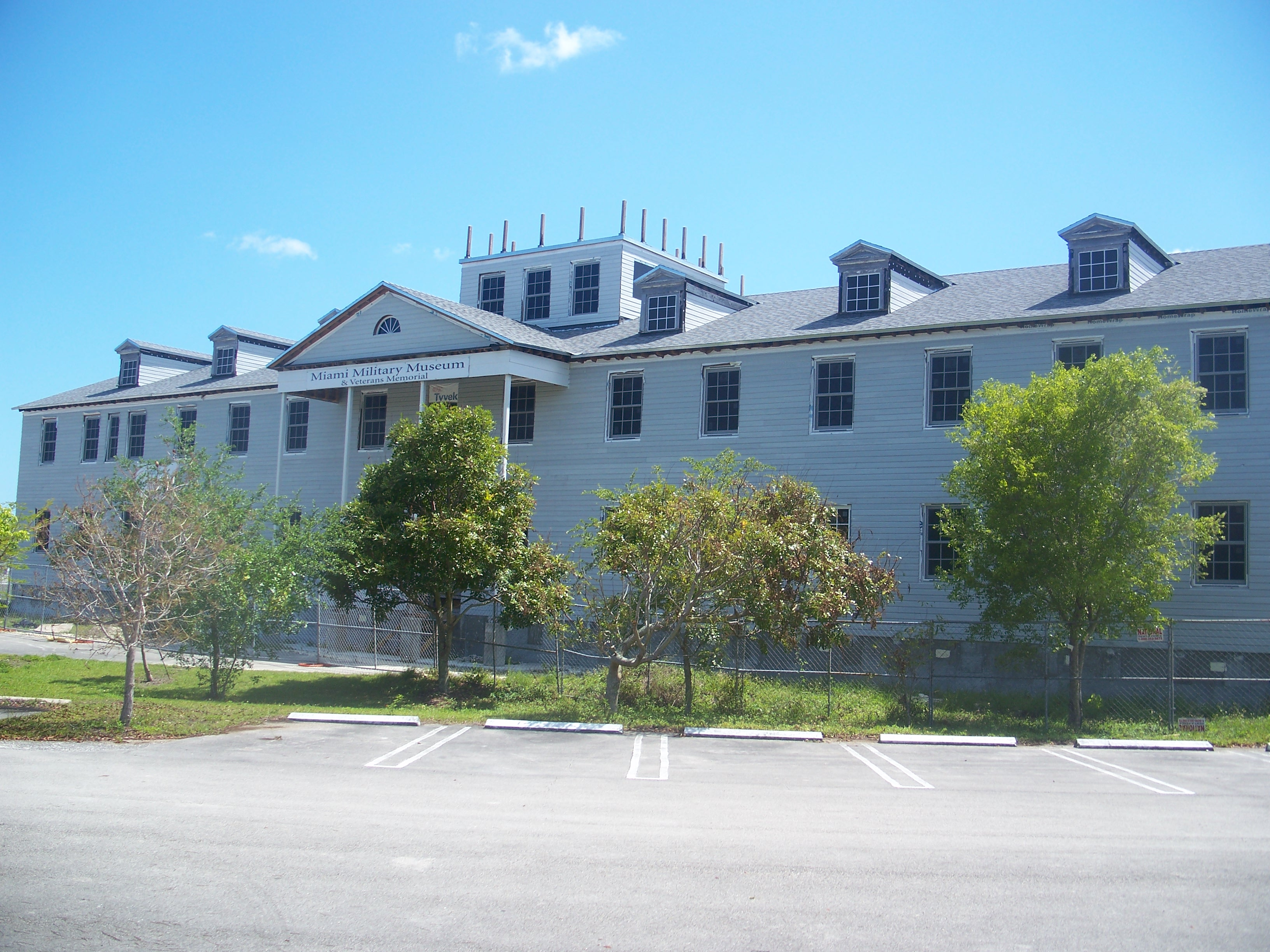

- Location within Miami Location within Florida Location within the United States
- Location: Miami, Florida
- Coordinates: 25.614773°N 80.400152°W
- NRHP reference No.: 100000933
- Added to NRHP: May 1, 2017
- Miami-Dade Military Museum
- Established: 2007; 19 years ago
- Location: 12460 SW 152nd St, Miami, Florida
- Type: Military museum
- Website: www.miamimilitarymuseum.org

The Naval Air Station Richmond Headquarters Building is a National Register of Historic Places-listed building in Miami, Florida. Built in 1942 as part of a blimp facility used in naval defense, the base was closed in 1961 and used for intelligence operations and military reserve activities until the base was significantly damaged by Hurricane Andrew in 1992. Following the hurricane, all base buildings were demolished except for the headquarters building, which in 2010 was relocated within the base and in 2018 was reopened as the Miami-Dade Military Museum.

== History ==
The two-story wooden building was originally the headquarters to the Richmond Naval Air Station, a blimp facility which focused on defending the southeast and Caribbean from German U Boat activities. The building was later used as a CIA headquarters for a covert operation. It was occupied by the Army Reserve and later the Marine Corps Reserve before being abandoned by the government. Anthony Atwood procured it from the federal government for $1 with the condition that he move it off federal property.

In 2019, Atwood was almost out of resources to keep the museum open. By 2022 Miami-Dade County stepped in to support the museum as a learning institution and to support ROTC activities. In April 2024, the museum gained approval to erect a historical marker in Chapman Field.

== See also ==
- List of Museums in Florida
- National Register of Historic Places listings in Miami, Florida
- Timeline of Miami, Florida history
