= Museum of the Islands =

Museum in Lee County, Florida

Coordinates: 26.61542°N 82.11981°W

Museum of the Islands (MOTI) is a museum in Pine Island Center, Lee County, Florida.

Exhibits include shells, dolls, household items, and fishing artifacts. The museum, housed in a former library building, opened in 1989.

== See also ==
- List of museums in Florida
