= Osceola County Welcome Center and History Museum =

Museum in Kissimmee, Florida, US

Coordinates: 28.3049°N 81.4497°W

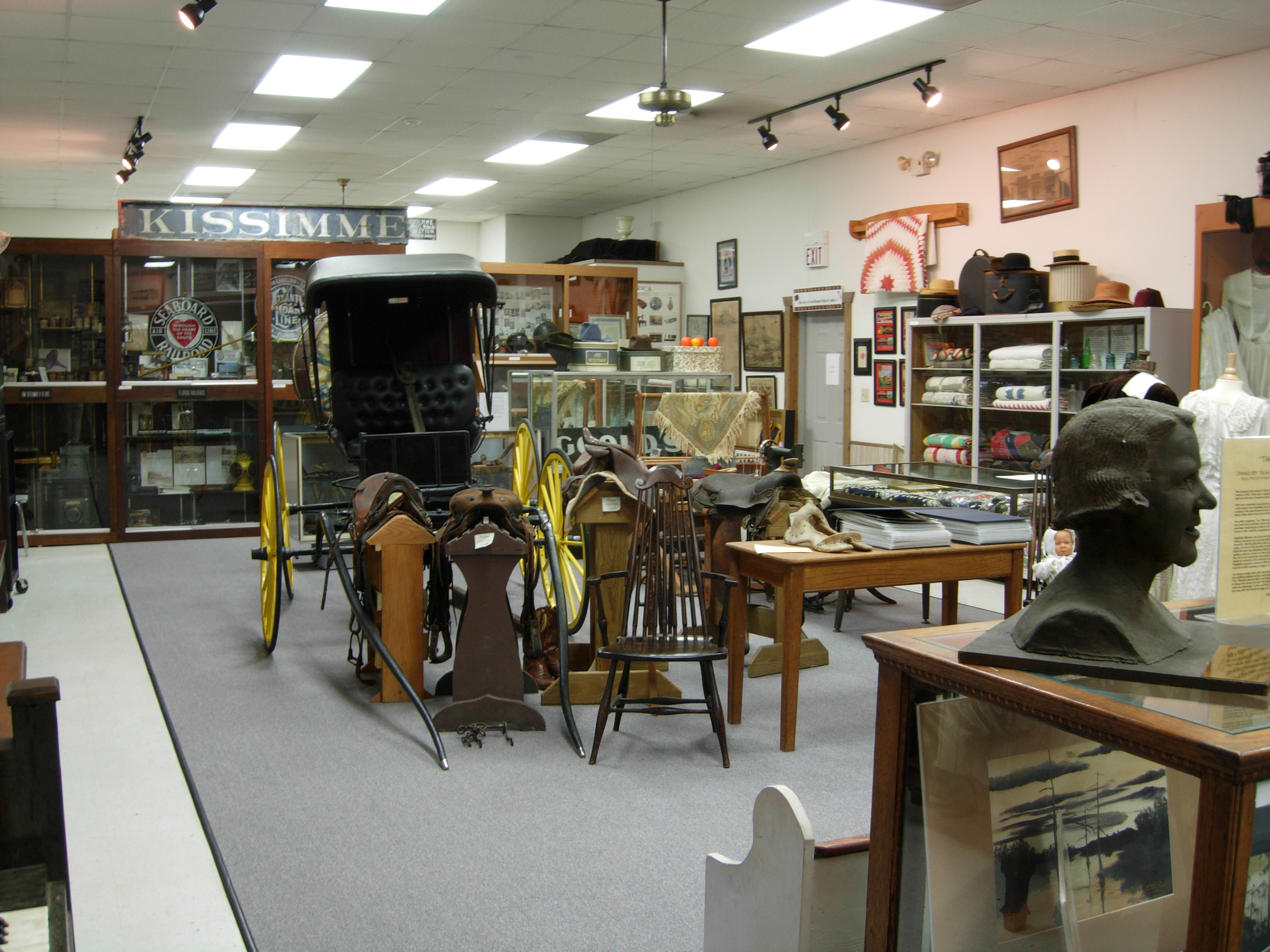
Osceola County Historical Society exhibit

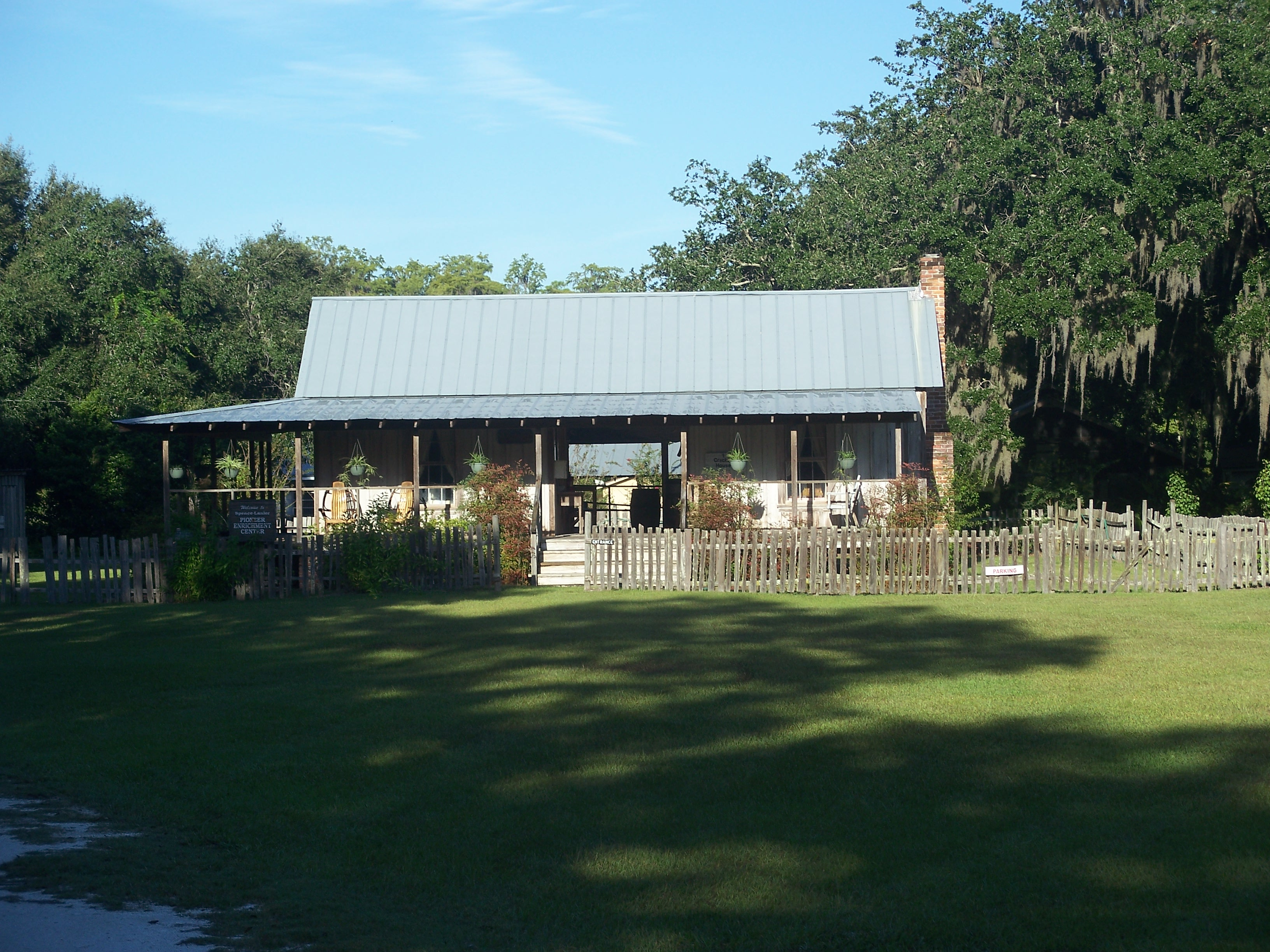
Pioneer Village

Osceola County Welcome Center and History Museum is in Kissimmee, Osceola County, Florida. It includes the Osceola County Historical Society Museum's local history exhibits as well as Pioneer Village and its 1889 Ross Lanier House, blacksmith shop, one-room schoolhouse, 1882 citrus packing house, general store, and "cracker house" cow camp. The center includes a multi-purpose room with 50 theater style seats and mini-kitchen. The center and museum are operated by Osceola County and the Osceola County Historical Society.

Exhibitions feature swamplands, pine flatwoods, oak hammock, and lakefront dioramas with interactive displays and scavenger hunt challenges. A screen room overlooks Shingle Creek, and it can be accessed outside the museum on the 7.8 acre Mary Kendall Steffee Nature Preserve.

== See also ==
- List of museums in Florida
