= The Art League of Daytona Beach =

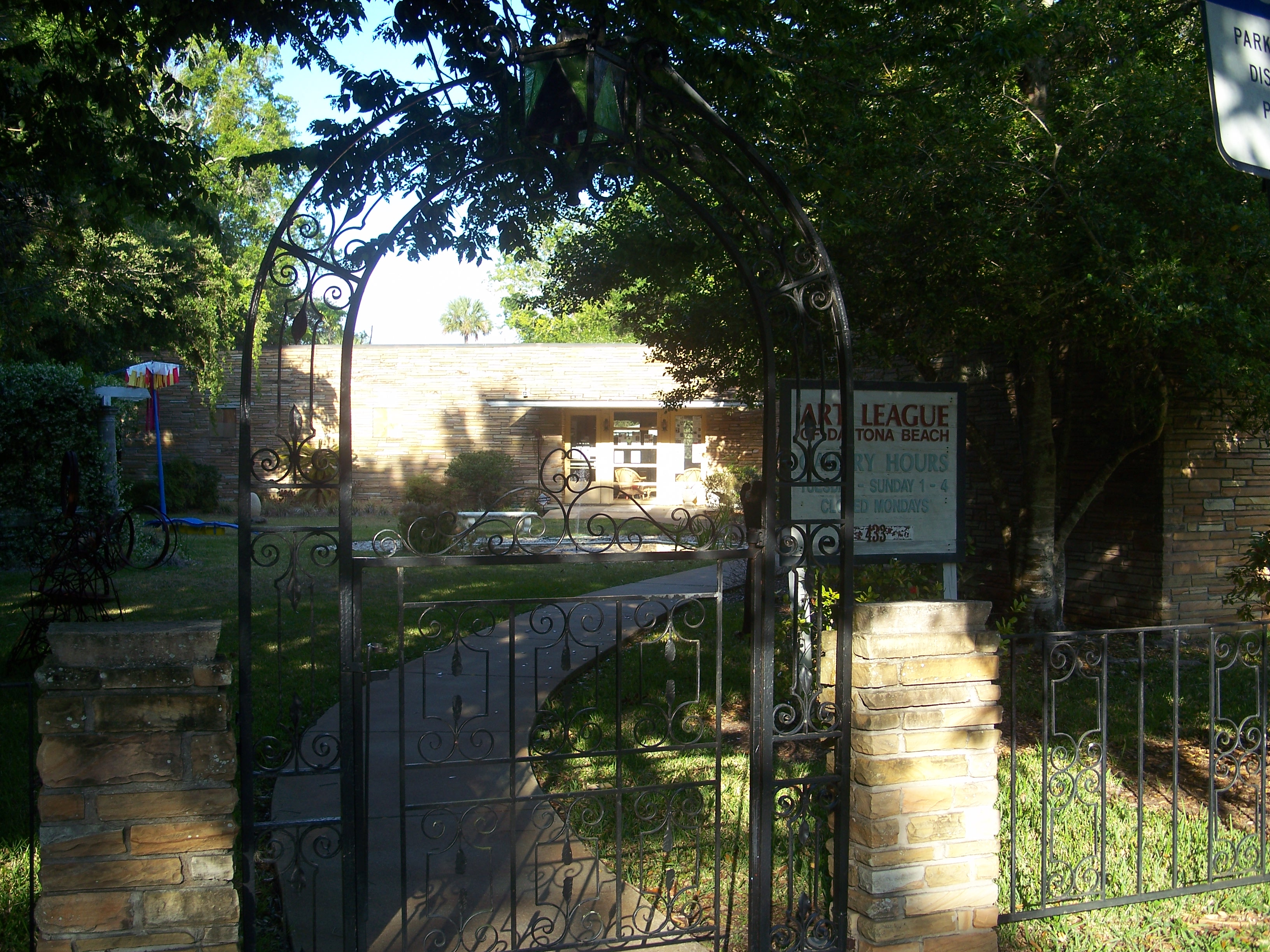

- Location within Volusia County
- Established: 1929
- Location: 433 South Palmetto Avenue; Daytona Beach, Florida
- Coordinates: 29.20501°N 81.01760°W
- Type: Art gallery
- Director: Connie Kryzowzki
- Website: www.artleague.org

The Art League of Daytona Beach is located at 433 South Palmetto Avenue, Daytona Beach, Florida. It contains exhibits by local artists, and holds regular classes and workshops.

== Gallery ==
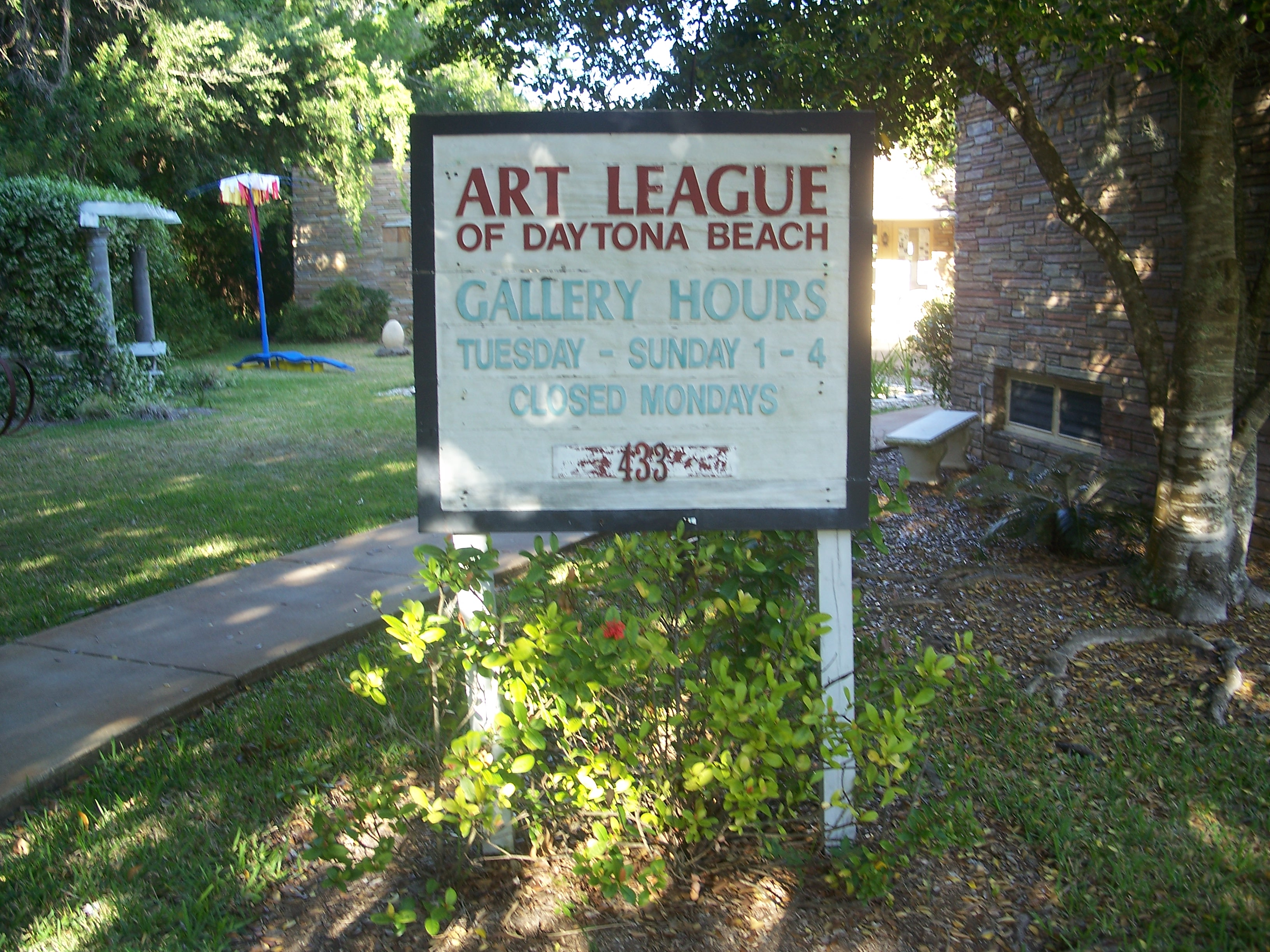

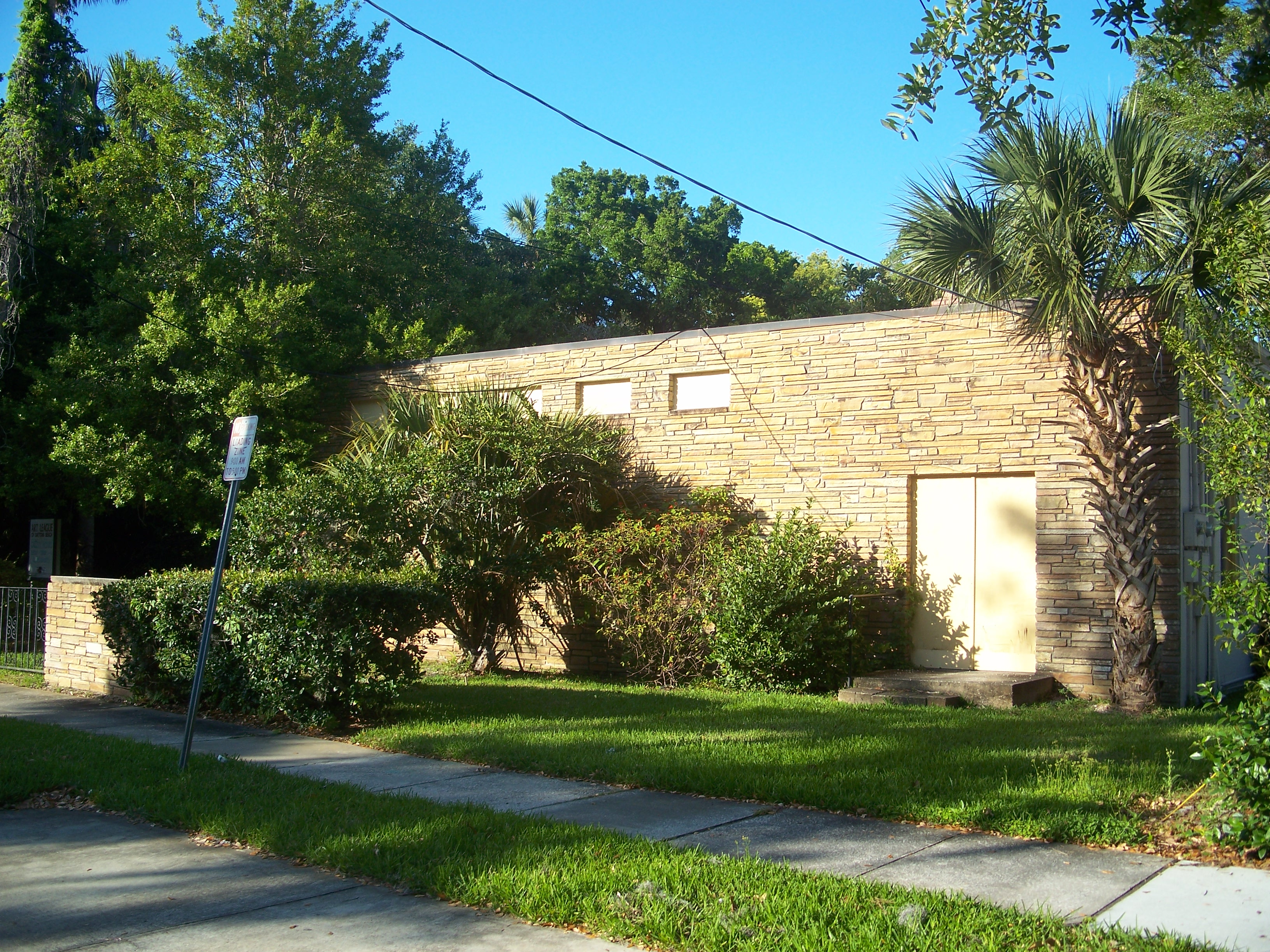
