= Gillespie Museum =

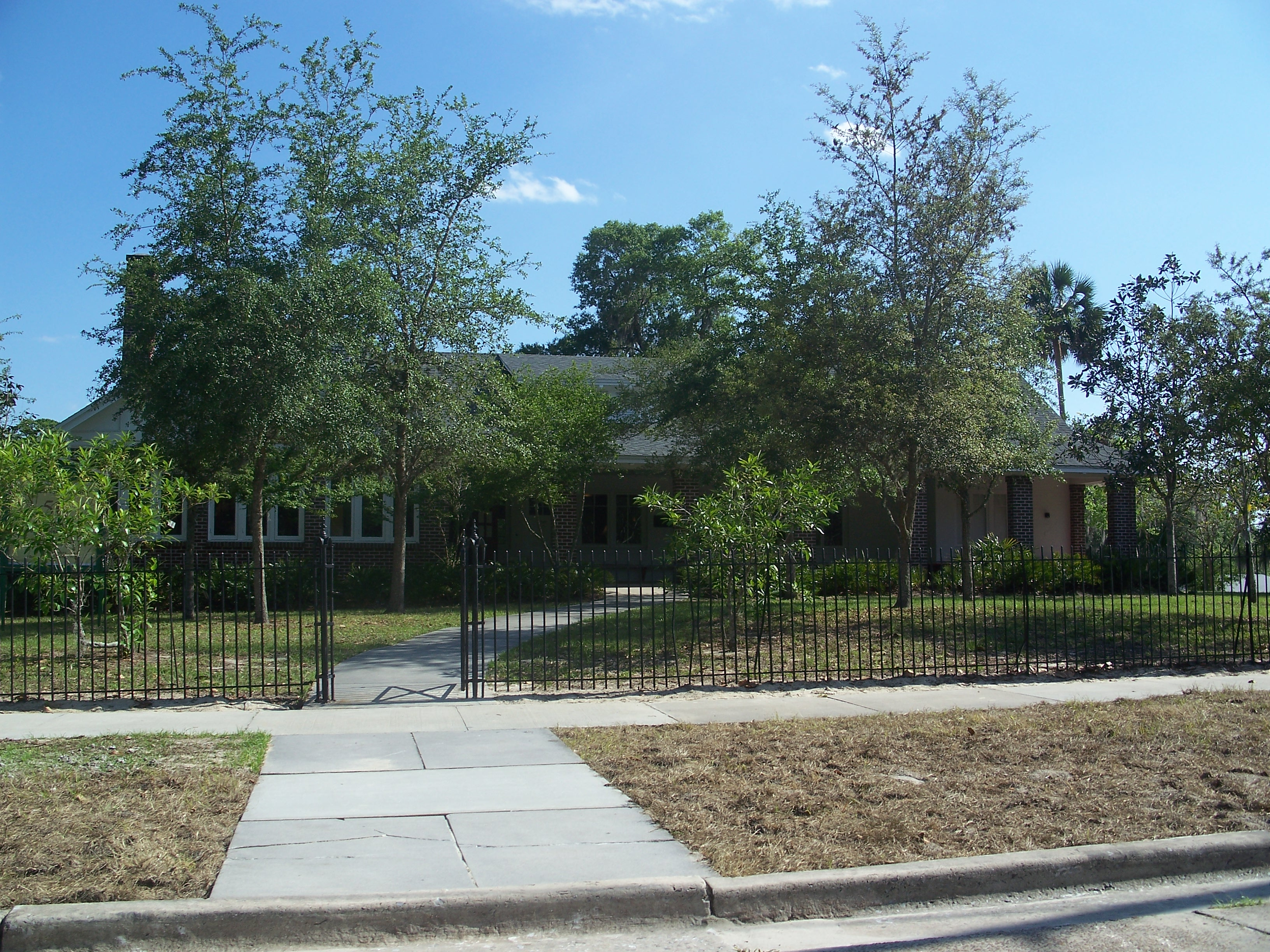

- Location within Volusia County
- Location: 234 East Michigan Avenue; DeLand, Florida
- Coordinates: 29.03313°N 81.29992°W
- Type: Science museum
- Website: The Gillespie Museum

The Gillespie Museum is located in DeLand, Florida, on the Stetson University campus. It houses one of the largest gem and mineral collections in the southeast.

Thomas Byrd and Nellie Gillespie began collecting after being struck by the beauty of a particularly fine mineral collection on display in Seattle in the 1930s. Assisted by mineralogists Edwin Over and Arthur Montgomery, their collection grew to include a considerable number of specimens spanning a wide range of species. After nearly three decades of collecting, the Gillespies donated a significant part of their collection to Stetson University in 1958. They continued to offer financial support for the acquisition of outstanding specimens, in addition to gifting more of their personal collection for years to come.

== Gallery ==
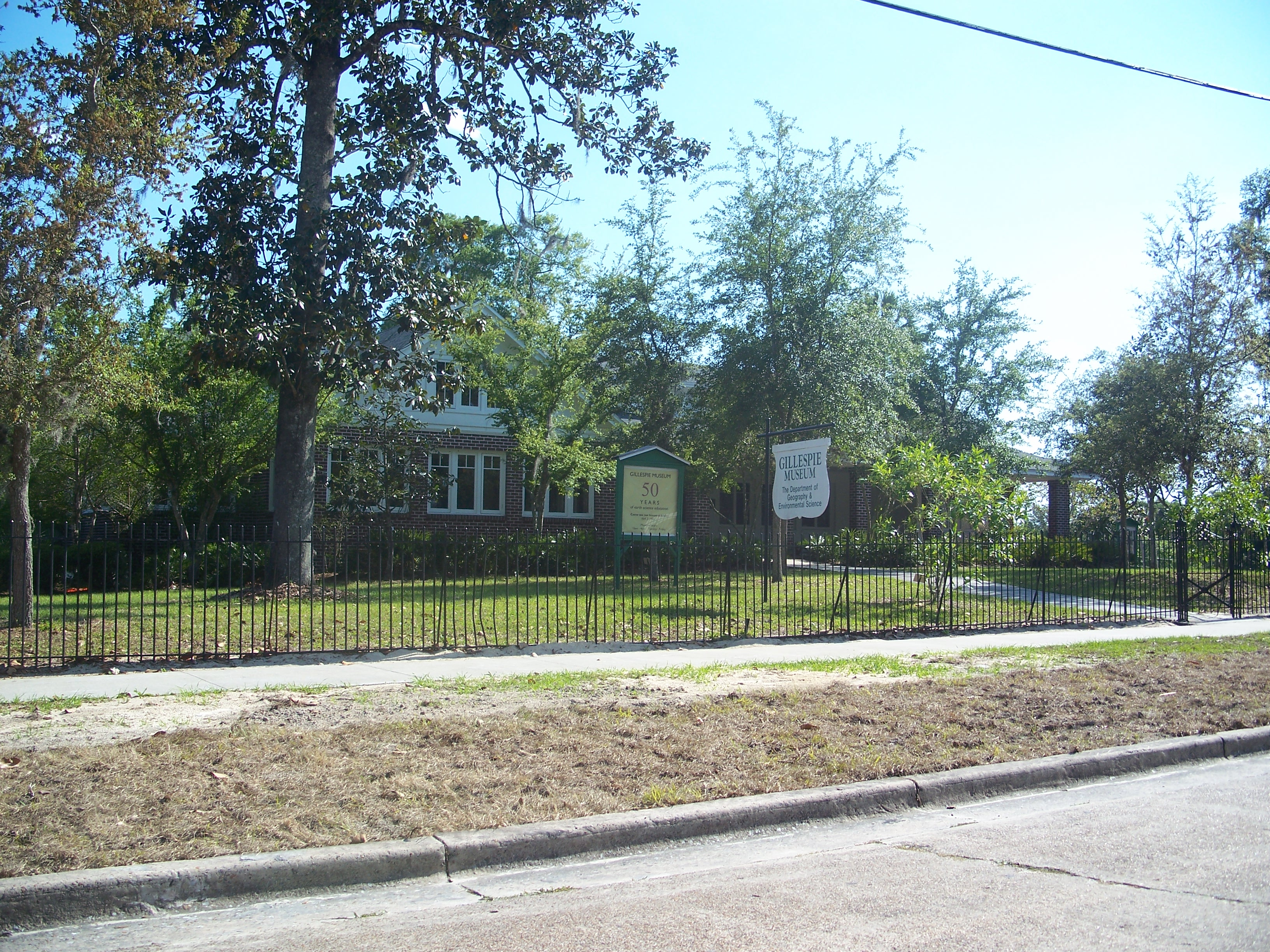
