= Palm Beach Photographic Center =

Coordinates: 26°42′49″N 80°3′16″W

The Palm Beach Photographic Centre is a non-profit visual arts organization dedicated to the enrichment of life through exhibitions and educational activities that promote the photographic arts. It is located in West Palm Beach, Florida.

== History ==
The Palm Beach Photographic Center was founded by Art & Fatima Nejame and was originally located in Boca Raton, Florida. In the early 1990s, the Photographic Center relocated to the Pineapple Grove arts district in the City of Delray Beach where it became a leading educational center in digital photos.

== FotoFusion ==
In the 1990s, the Center developed the annual FotoFusion photography festival, which has hosted international photographers such as Gordon Parks. The Palm Beach County Cultural Council estimated that the FotoFusion festival contributed significant revenue to the City of Delray Beach.

== Relocation/Library ==
In 2009, the Palm Beach Photographic Center moved to the new library center in West Palm Beach where they opened in a modern facility larger than 30,000 square feet (2,800 m^{2}).
