= Palm Cottage (Naples, Florida) =

Historic house in Florida, United States

- Historic Palm Cottage
- U.S. National Register of Historic Places
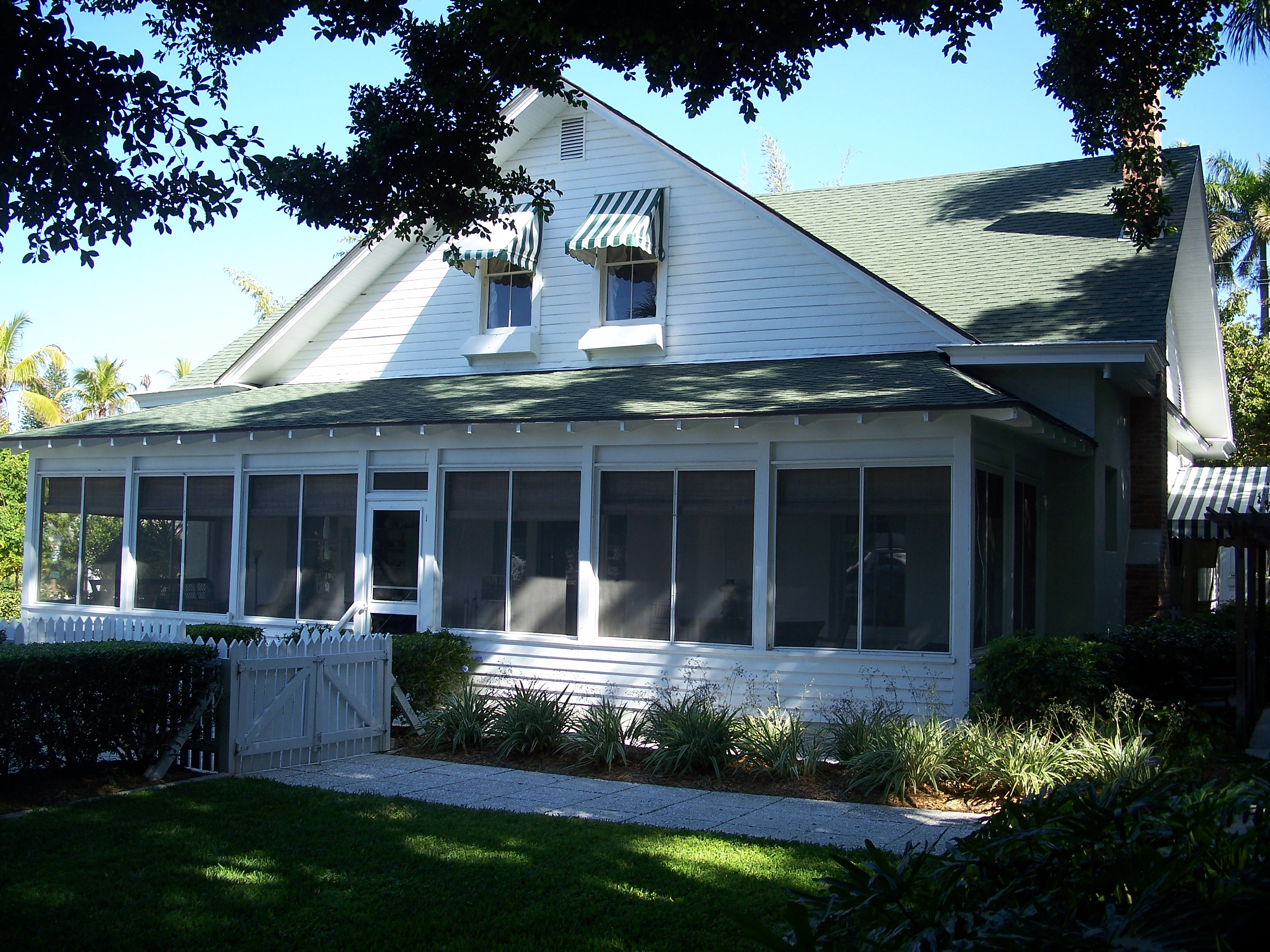

- Location within Florida Location within the United States
- Interactive map showing the location of Palm Cottage
- Location: Naples, Florida
- Coordinates: 26°7′54″N 81°48′15″W
- Architectural style: Masonry Vernacular
- NRHP reference No.: 82002371
- Added to NRHP: May 24, 1982

The Naples Historical Society's Historic Palm Cottage (also known as the Henry Watterson Cottage or The Cement Cottage, The Parmer Home, or Hamilton House) is a historic home in Naples, Florida. It is located in the Naples Historic District.

The antiques filled cottage, is a rare example of tabby mortar construction. The Historic Palm Cottage is Naples oldest house (1895) and is proudly maintained by the Naples Historical Society and is located at 137 12th Avenue South,(at Gulfshore Blvd.) a block East of Naples Pier. On May 24, 1982, it was added to the U.S. National Register of Historic Places.

It was the summer cottage of the Louisville, Ky Courier Journal and Times then owner/editor, Walter N. Haldeman. Other Louisvillians owned homes in the area in this era.

The house is owned and operated as a museum by the Naples Historical Society. The house has been decorated to reflect the early 1900s, and include the adjacent Norris Gardens, which feature five distinct themed areas and both the garden and house are open for docent guided tours Tuesdays through Saturdays from 1:00 p.m. to 4:00 p.m. More information at: http://www.napleshistoricalsociety.org/

== References and external links ==
- Collier County listings at National Register of Historic Places
- Florida's Office of Cultural and Historical Programs
  - Collier County listings
  - Palm Cottage
  - Famous Floridians of Naples
- A History Of Palm Cottage
