= Duncan Gallery of Art =

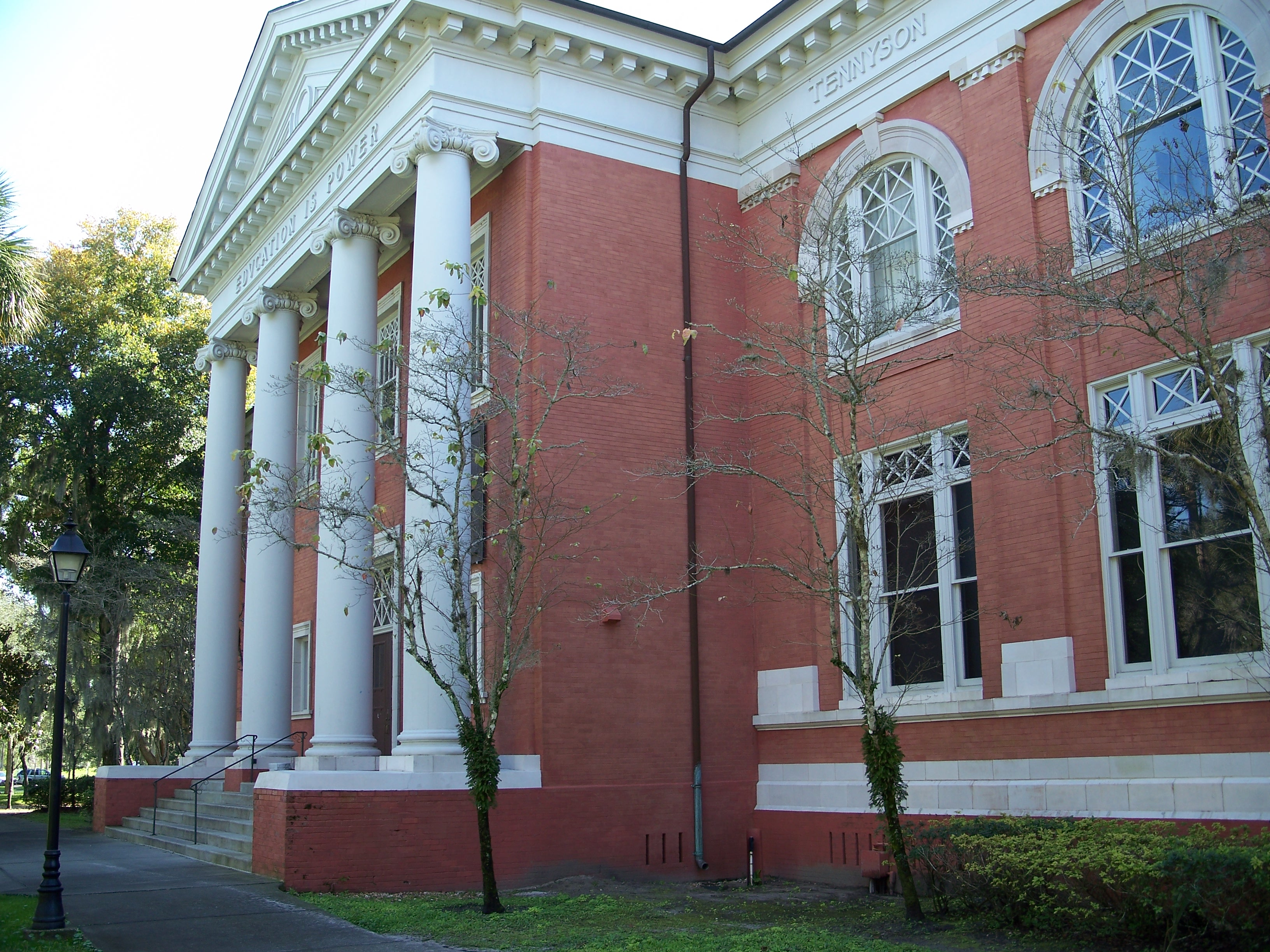
- Sampson Hall, which houses the Gallery

- Location within Volusia County
- Location: 421 North Woodland Boulevard; DeLand, Florida
- Coordinates: 29.03449°N 81.30263°W
- Type: Art museum
- Website: Duncan Gallery of Art

The Duncan Gallery of Art is located at 421 North Woodland Boulevard, DeLand, Florida, in Sampson Hall on the Stetson University campus. It contains artworks primarily by student and southeast artists.

== Gallery ==
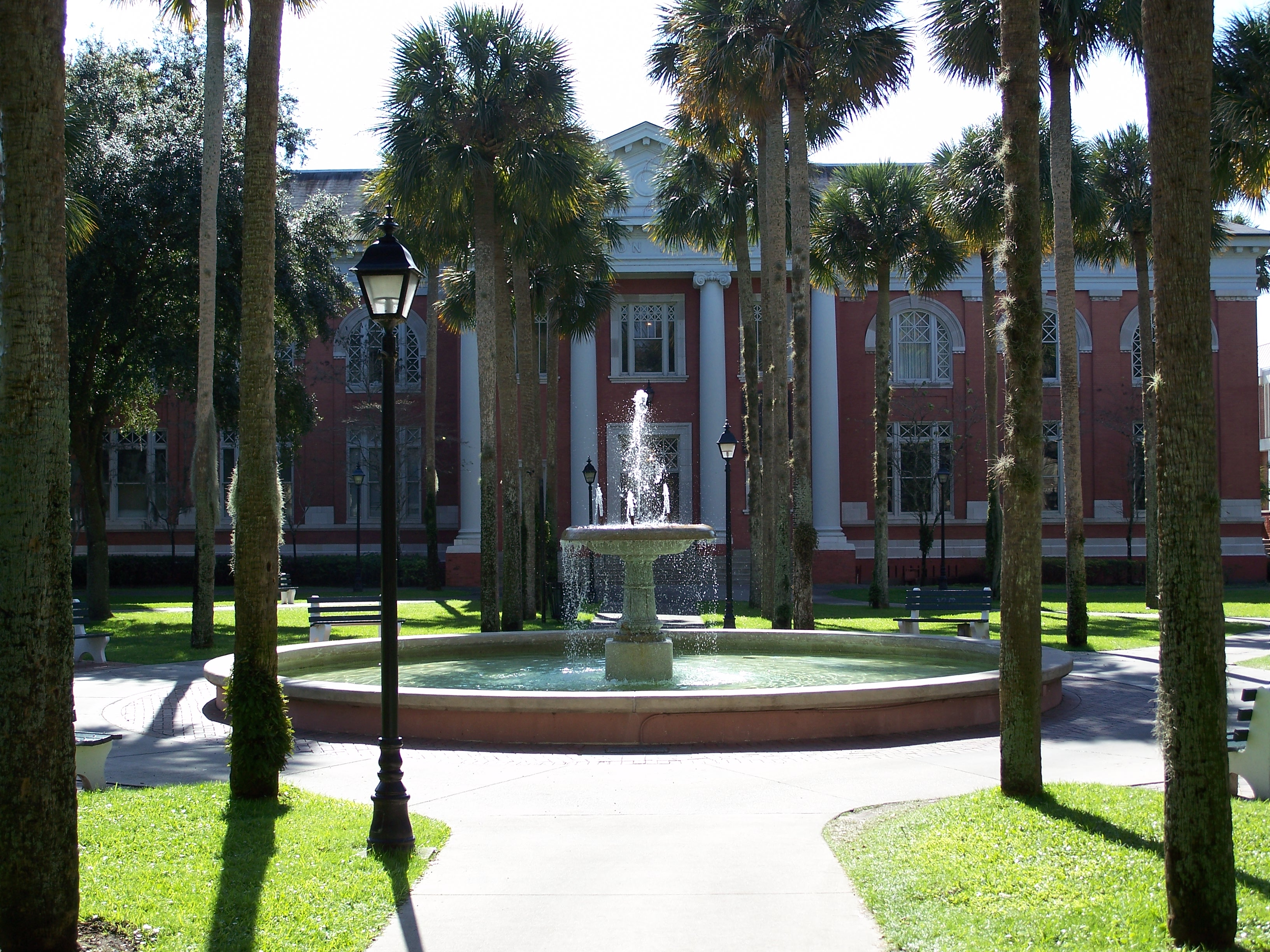
