= Indian River Citrus Museum =

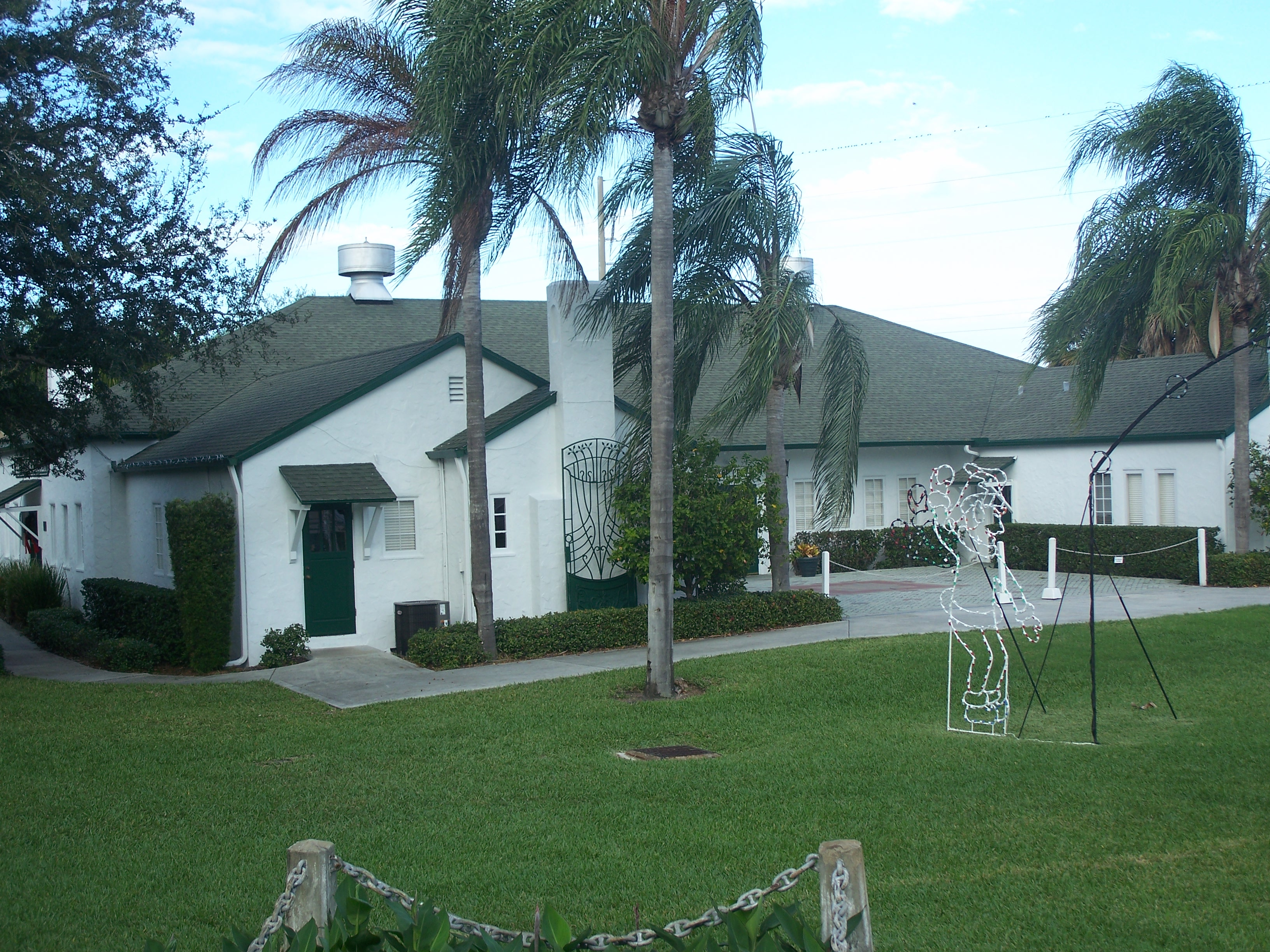

- Location within Florida
- Established: WW II
- Location: 2140 14th Avenue; Vero Beach, Florida
- Coordinates: 27.640771°N 80.398499°W
- Type: History
- Director: Robert Boob
- Website: Indian River Citrus Museum

The Indian River Citrus Museum is located at 2140 14th Avenue, Vero Beach, Florida. It houses an exhibit on the citrus industry in Indian River County.
