= Pioneer Florida Museum and Village =

Open-air museum in Dade City, Florida

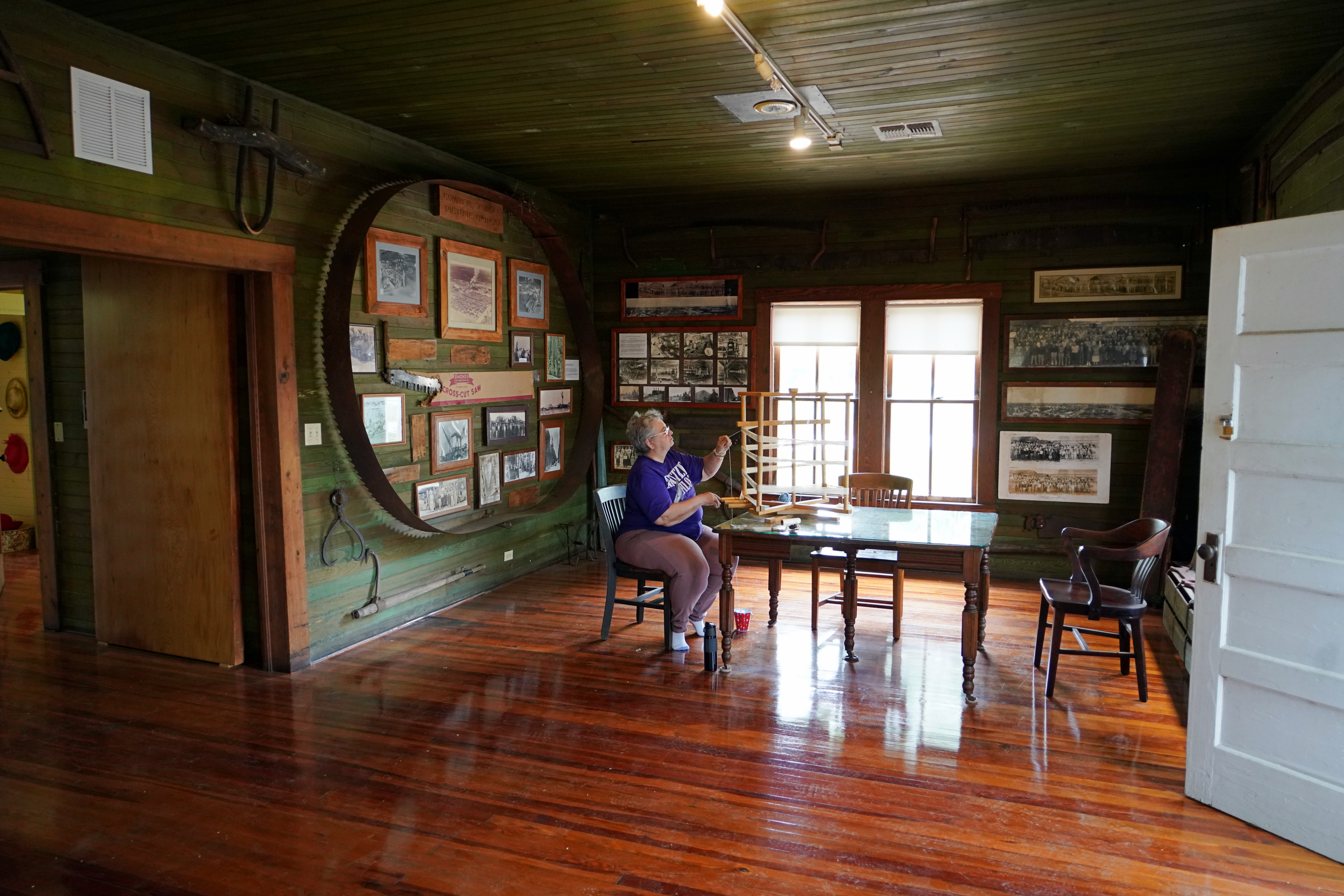
- A room from a building housing the Lacoochee display, 2019 photo
- Established: April 28, 1961
- Location: Dade City, Florida
- Coordinates: 28°23′08″N 82°11′27″W
- Website: http://www.pioneerfloridamuseum.org/

Pioneer Florida Museum and Village is an open-air museum in Dade City, Florida in Pasco County. The museum complex includes Overstreet House, a one-room schoolhouse, a church, a train depot, a train engine, and a museum exhibition of tools, household items, antiques and farm equipment.
