= Seminole County Home =

- U.S. National Register of Historic Places
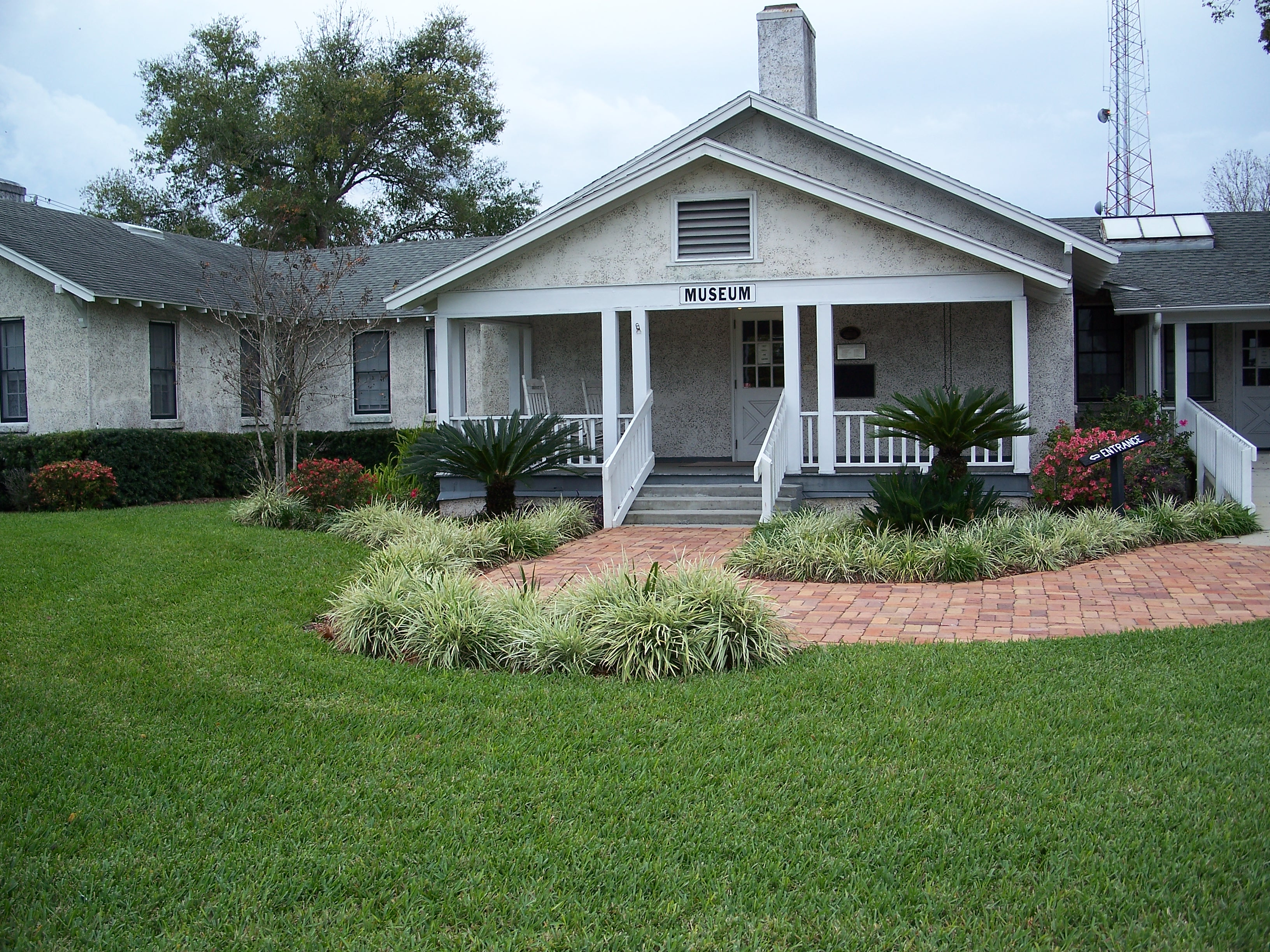

- Location within Florida Location within the United States
- Location: Sanford, Florida; United States; North America
- Coordinates: 28°44′35″N 81°17′58″W
- Built: 1926
- NRHP reference No.: 99000696
- Added to NRHP: June 10, 1999

The Seminole County Home is a historic site located at 300 Bush Boulevard in Sanford, Florida, United States, North America.

== History ==
On June 10, 1999, the site was added to the National Register of Historic Places.

== Museum of Seminole County History ==
The Museum of Seminole County History located at the site focuses on the history of Seminole County and includes exhibits on the area's Native American inhabitants, early settlers and military operations, the impact of railroads and steamships, local agriculture and industries, antiques, and historic artifacts.
