= Emerald Coast Science Center =

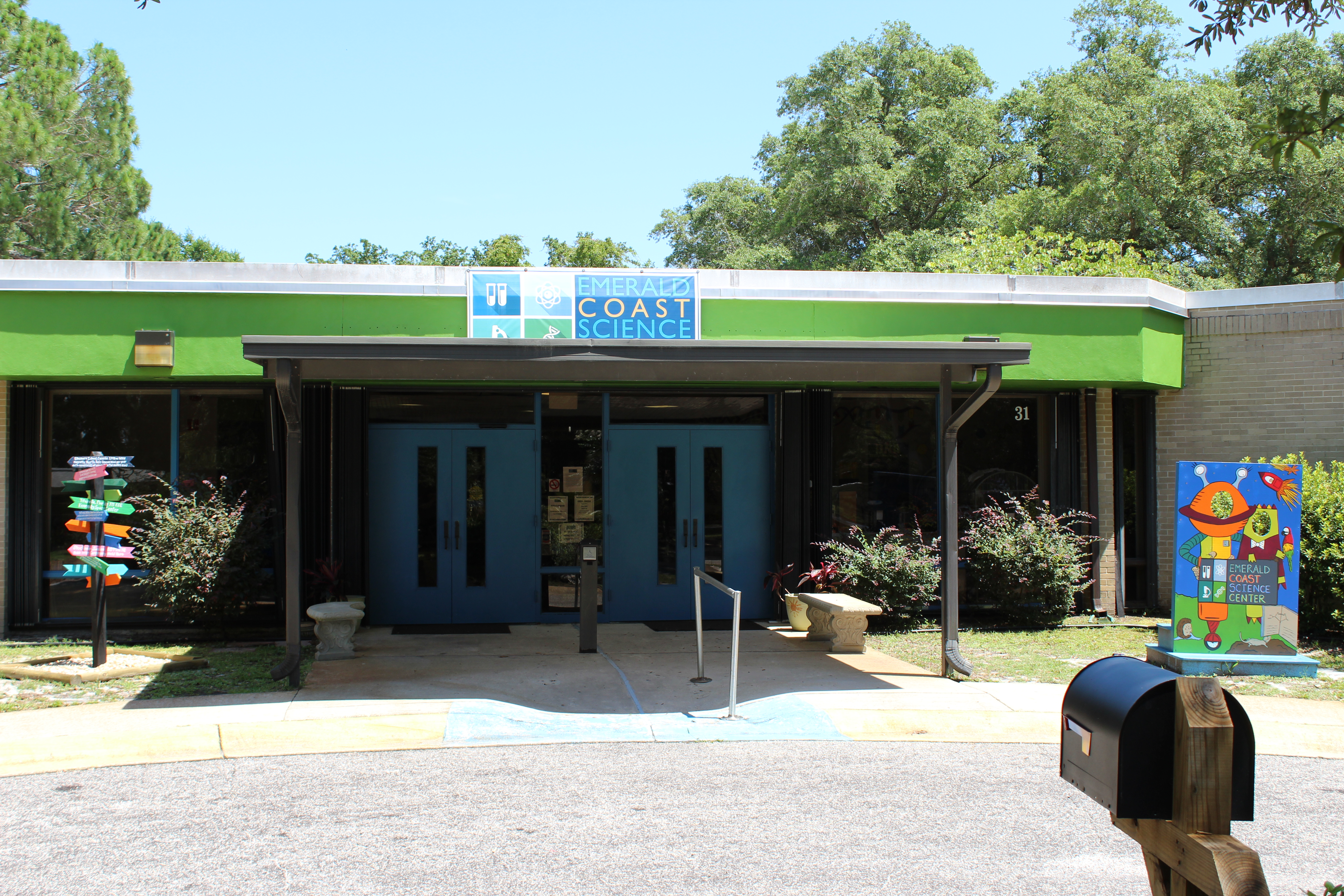
- Established: 1989
- Location: 31 SW Memorial Parkway; Fort Walton Beach, Florida
- Coordinates: 30.40888°N 86.62894°W
- Type: Science
- Website: ecscience.org

The Emerald Coast Science Center (ECSC) is hands-on science discovery center located in Fort Walton Beach, Okaloosa County, Florida.

The Center was established in 1989 as the FOCUS (Families of Okaloosa County Understanding Science) Center and changed its name to Emerald Coast Science Center in 2001. ECSC is a nonprofit center with a mission of inspiring and growing a scientifically engaged community.

== Exhibits ==
Exhibits include both inside and outside spaces. Inside the museum features an animal room, a Makerspace room, KITS in the kitchen, the Florida Ecosystem exhibit room and two main open floor plan halls that host hands-on exhibits, brain games, robotics exhibits and more. The outside space hosts a turtle habitat, butterfly garden, shuffleboard court and more.
