= Museum of the Glades =

History museum in Belle Glade, Florida

Coordinates: 26.6812°N 80.6695°W

The Lawrence E. Will Museum, governed by the Glades Historical Society, is a museum of local history located in Belle Glade, Florida.

The Museum of the Glades represents the total Glades experience with an archive collection that dates back to the early Belle Glade people present thousands of years ago, the Seminoles, early pioneer settlements, agricultural tools and innovations, the early hurricanes of the 20th century, and local history records through the 1960s.

Part of Palm Beach County, the city of Belle Glade is on the southeastern shore of Lake Okeechobee and part of the Everglades Agricultural Area.

The museum is a member of the American Association for State and Local History (AASLH).

== Museum History ==
The museum incorporated as a non-profit in 1976 as a bicentennial observance. The museum's collection was housed in the Belle Glade Branch Library, part of the Palm Beach County Library System, until 2013 when the library relocated.

Lawrence E. Will, the son of Glades pioneer Theodore Will, started the local archive with his own research, photographs, and manuscripts about pioneer life and the culture of the area. His writings on Lake Okeechobee and the northern Everglades produced six books. His writings were all based on first-hand accounts and interviews "during his time operating freight, passenger, and tow boats, as well as floating dredges, in all parts of the Everglades" His best known titles are A Cracker History of Okeechobee and the 1928 Hurricane-Okeechobee Hurricane and the Herbert Hoover Dike.

In the 1930s, the Works Progress Administration, in partnership with the Smithsonian, excavated a prehistoric mound outside the city limits. Archeologists discovered a type site with artifacts dating back over 3,000 years old that explain a culture of prehistoric communities. The "Belle Glade People" were a thriving culture until the mid-1700s. The archives grew following the 1977 excavation of the Belle Glade Mound that held many artifacts including pottery, shells, and bones. In 2012, an archaeologist completed research on the Belle Glade Mound Collection at the Smithsonian, and the prehistoric Native Americans that lived in the area between 700AD-1500AD. For many decades, the archives were curated by Dr. Joseph Orsenigo until his death in 2009.

In 2012, the Belle Glade Historical Society reorganized to become the Museum of the Glades.

== Archaeological Significance ==
The Belle Glades Culture is estimated to have prospered from around 500 BC through 1500 AD. These early people were well organized and had an extensive trade network with other tribes in Florida. During the 1930s, archeologists excavated the Belle Glade Mound, which was the first large mound site to be uncovered.
