= Dinosaur Wildlife =

Defunct museum in Spring Hill, Florida

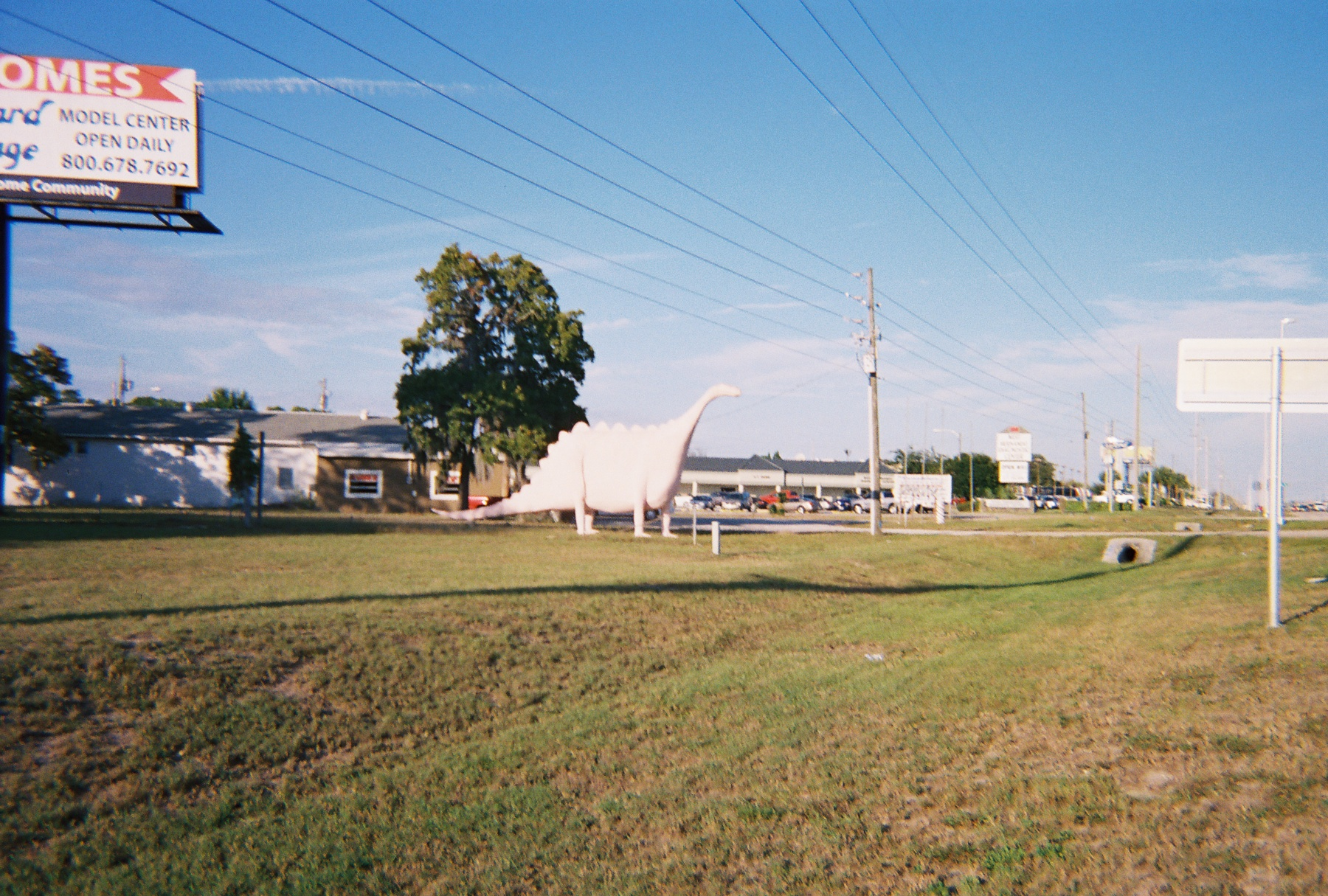
- Dinosaur outside of Dinosaur Wildlife
- Former name: Foxbower Wildlife Museum; Foxbower Wildlife Exhibit
- Established: 1962
- Dissolved: 1998
- Coordinates: 28°28′42″N 82°36′42″W
- Owner: Jacob S. Foxbower

Dinosaur Wildlife was a tourist attraction and museum that was open from 1962 to 1998 off U.S. Route 19 in Spring Hill, Florida. A medium-sized building with a 60-foot (18 m) long hall filled with four rows of 28 display cases, as well as exhibits on the floor and walls, Dinosaur Wildlife presented a vast collection of taxidermy, particularly relating to Floridian insects and animals.

== Naming ==
Despite being named Dinosaur Wildlife, the attraction consisted of many taxidermied animals. The owner and taxidermist Jacob S. Foxbower named it so and erected a 18 foot high pink dinosaur sculpture—ostensibly a stegosaurus—to bring in visitors excited by a wave of popular interest in dinosaurs in the 1960s. When that did not work as well as hoped, the place was renamed Foxbower Wildlife Museum. However, people thought this meant entry was free, so it was renamed again to Foxbower Wildlife.

== Exhibits ==
Some of the most prominent exhibits were taxidermies of a two-headed calf, a four-legged chick, and various albino animals: more specifically, an albino squirrel, opossum, shrew, mockingbird, and two minks were displayed. There were also some exhibits that were unconventional in other ways, such as three fox squirrels posed to fight in a boxing ring and an alphabet made of branches shaped like each letter. There were more than 1,100 taxidermized animals that Jacob had collected over about 62 years.

The gift shop in the front room offered typical museum fare such as plastic animal figurines and postcards, as well as cured otter and raccoon pelts for sale. Not much profit was made, especially when the building was left to decay.

== Decline ==
The attraction never made much money, so Jacob rented out some of the property to two tenants, including another local business, Elio's Barbershop. Passing motorists often believed that Foxbower Wildlife had been abandoned, because of the vandalized dinosaur, the drawn windows, and irregular hours of business. It did not help that Disney World established itself in Florida and dominated the competition for visitors.

When Jacob Foxbower died in 1988, his wife Mary and son Gerald continued to run the attraction. The passion and business waned, causing Foxbower Wildlife to decline even as it remained open for another decade. It officially closed in 1998, with hopes to sell the taxidermy collection.
