= Matheson =

Matheson may refer to:

== People ==
- Matheson (surname)
- Clan Matheson, Scottish clan of that name
- Matheson baronets, two baronetcies in the Baronetage of the United Kingdom
- Matheson family, a political family in Utah, USA
- Matheson Bayley, a British entertainer
- Matheson Lang, a Canadian actor and playwright

== Companies ==
- Matheson (automobile), defunct US automobile manufacturer
- Matheson (compressed gas & equipment), manufacturer of industrial, specialty, and electronics gases
- Matheson (law firm), Ireland's largest corporate tax law firm
- Matheson & Company, London correspondents for Jardine Matheson Holdings

== Places ==
=== Canada ===
==== Manitoba ====
- Matheson Island, Manitoba, a community in Canada
  - Matheson Island Airport, Manitoba, Canada

==== Ontario ====
- Matheson, Ontario, a town in Canada
  - Matheson Fire, a 1916 forest fire
  - Matheson railway station, Black River-Matheson, Ontario, Canada
- Matheson House (Perth), a historic house in Perth, Ontario, Canada
- Matheson Boulevard, a boulevard in Toronto

==== Saskatchewan ====
- Matheson Lake, a lake in Meadow Lake Provincial Park, Saskatchewan

=== United States ===
==== Florida ====
- Matheson Hammock Park, Miami, Florida, USA
- Matheson Museum, a history museum in Gainesville, Florida, USA
  - Matheson House (Gainesville, Florida), a historic building

==== Other states ====
- Matheson, Colorado, an unincorporated town
- Matheson Junior High School, in Magna, Utah

=== Other places ===
- Lake Matheson, New Zealand
- Matheson Glacier, Antarctica

== See also ==
- Mathesons Bay
