= Matheson House =

Matheson House may refer to:

- Matheson House (Gainesville, Florida), a historic home on the National Register of Historic Places in the United States
- Matheson House (Perth), a National Historic Site of Canada in Perth, Ontario
