= Perth Museum (disambiguation) =

Perth Museum may refer to:

- Matheson House (Perth), a historic house in Ontario, Canada that houses the Perth Museum
- Perth Art Gallery in Perth, Scotland, formerly the Perth Museum and Art Gallery
- Perth Museum in Perth, Scotland, opened in 2024

== See also ==
- Museum of Perth in Perth, Western Australia
- Western Australian Museum in Perth, Western Australia
