= Church of the Mediator =

Church of the Mediator may refer to:

- Church of the Mediator (Micanopy, Florida)
- Episcopal Church of the Mediator (Bronx, New York)
