= North Central Florida =

Region of Florida, United States

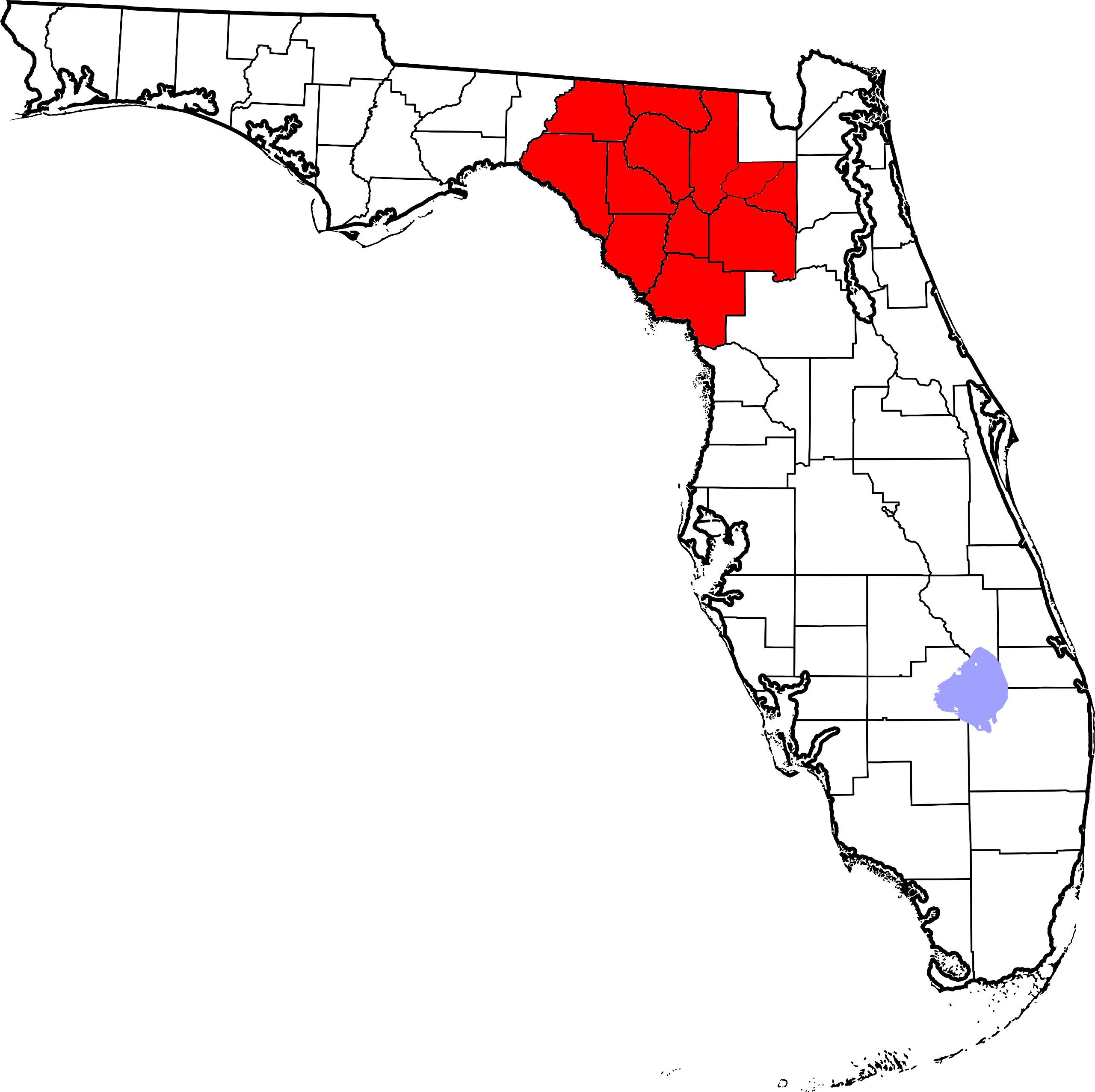
Map of the counties in north central Florida

North Central Florida is a region of the U.S. state of Florida in the north-central part of the state. Part of the North Florida vernacular region, the definition used by the North Central Florida Regional Planning Council includes Alachua, Bradford, Columbia, Dixie, Gilchrist, Hamilton, Lafayette, Levy, Madison, Taylor, and Union counties, while the definition used by Florida Trend also includes Marion County. The region's largest city is Gainesville, home of the University of Florida and center of the Gainesville metropolitan area, which is the largest metro area of the region. As of 2020, the region had a population of 575,622 people.

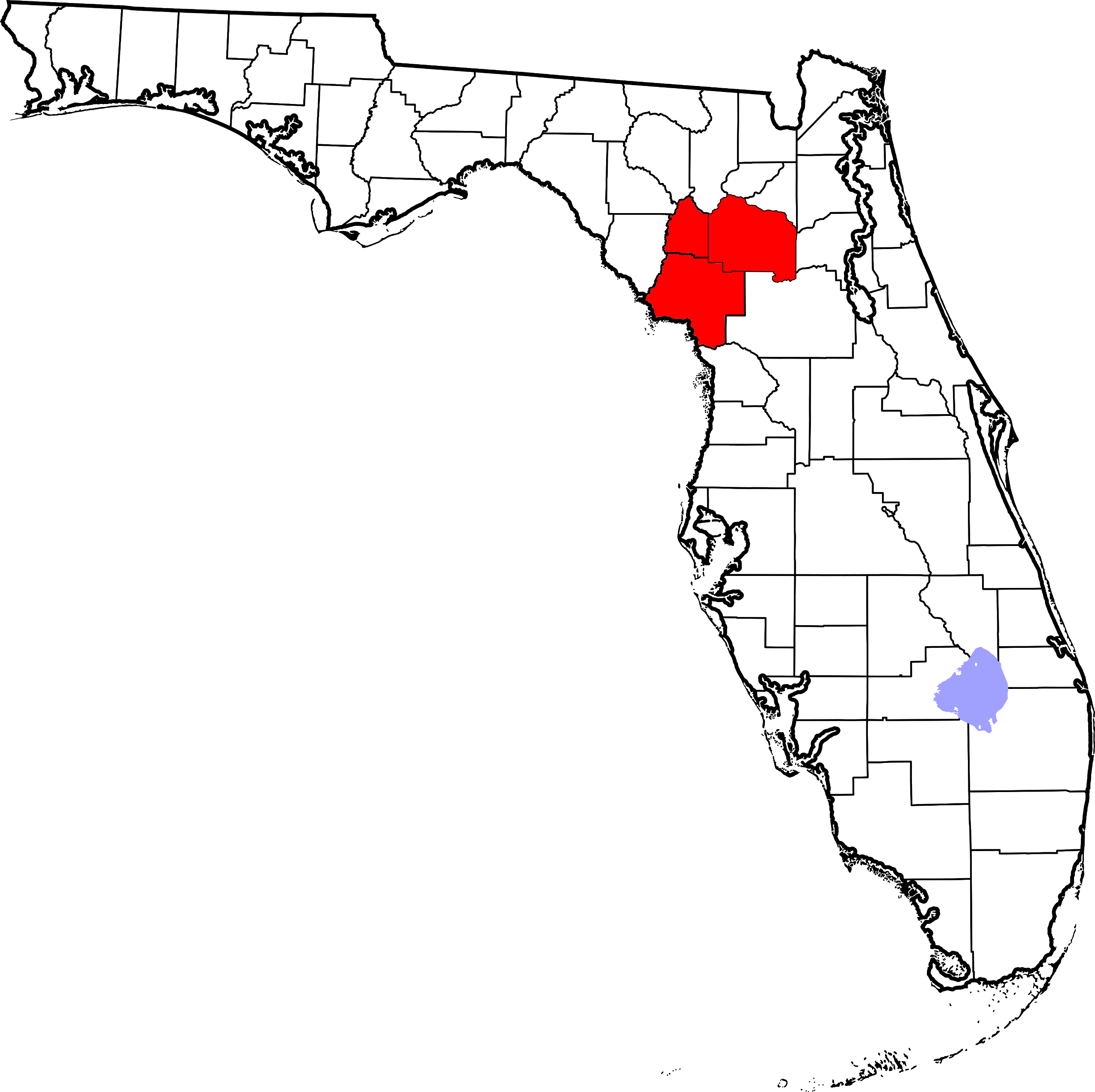
Map of the counties in the Gainesville metropolitan area, the population center of north central Florida.

The landscape and climate of north central Florida is considered to be humid subtropical. The main cultural hub and economic driver is the University of Florida in Gainesville.

== Economy ==
As of 2016, the region had Florida's largest concentration of 18 to 44-year-olds and people with advanced degrees thanks to the presence of the University of Florida and Santa Fe College in Gainesville.

The city of Alachua is home to one of the state's largest bio- and life-science corporate sectors.

Overall, education and healthcare are the leading employers in the region as several major hospitals are located in Gainesville, such as the UF Health Shands Hospital, HCA Florida North Florida Hospital, and the Malcolm Randall Veterans Affairs Medical Center.

Tourism is central to communities such as Cedar Key, White Springs, and Micanopy.

Leading employers as of 2016 are:

#	Employer	Industry	#of employees
1	University of Florida	Education	27567
2	UF Health Shands System	Healthcare	12705
3	Veterans Affairs Medical Center	Healthcare	6127
4	Alachua County School Board	Public education	3904
5	City of Gainesville	City government	2072
6	HCA Florida North Florida Hospital	Healthcare	2000
7	Gator Dining Services	Food service	1200
8	Nationwide Insurance Company	Insurance	960
9	Alachua County	Government	809
10	Publix Supermarkets	Grocery	780
11	Santa Fe College	Education	750
12	Wal-Mart Distribution Center	Grocery	738
13	Dollar General Distribution Center	Retail	600
14	RTI Surgical	Orthopedic/cardio implants	518
15	Wal-Mart Stores	Grocery	312
		Total	60524

== Education ==
The following institutions of higher education are located within north central Florida:

- University of Florida – Gainesville
- Santa Fe College – Gainesville, Alachua, Starke, Archer
- Florida Gateway College – Lake City
- North Florida College – Madison, Live Oak
- College of Central Florida – Chiefland
- North Florida Technical College – Starke
- City College Gainesville

== Culture ==
North central Florida is world-renowned for its fresh water springs and rivers which make it one of the best cave diving regions in the world. Several of the springs are connected to the Suwannee and Santa Fe River systems, some of the more popular being:

- Ginnie Springs
- Wes Skiles Peacock Springs
- Devil's Den
- Manatee Springs

There are a large number of nature parks and cultural centers throughout the area such as:

- Stephen Foster Folk Culture Center State Park
- Big Shoals State Park
- Suwanee River State Park
- Ichetucknee Springs State Park
- Devil's Millhopper Geological State Park
- Paynes Prairie Preserve State Park

Florida pioneer life in the 1800s is the focus at both Morningside Nature Center and Dudley Farm Historic State Park. There are several small, turn-of-the-century towns that represent the culture of the Deep South and are geared toward tourists:

- Cedar Key
- White Springs
- Steinhatchee
- Micanopy
- Melrose

Several museums of note spanning topics such as local and natural history, science, and art are:

- Florida Museum of Natural History
- Samuel P. Harn Museum of Art
- Cade Museum for Creativity and Invention
- P.K. Yonge Library of Florida History
- University Galleries
- Gainesville Fine Arts Association Gallery
- Matheson History Museum
- The Historic Thomas Center
- Cedar Key Museum State Park
- Micanopy Historical Society Museum
- Forest Capital Museum State Park

Gainesville is home to notable performing arts venues like the Curtis M. Phillips Center for the Performing Arts, University Auditorium, Constans Theater, and The Hippodrome Theater. The Gainesville Orchestra has been performing regularly since 1983.

The most popular sporting events are the major sports associated with the University of Florida in Gainesville, including Florida Gator Football, Basketball, and Baseball. Gatornationals is one of the most important annual drag races for the National Hot Rod Association (NHRA).
