= Moses Elias Levy =

Moroccan-American businessman and slave owner (1782–1854)

- Born: 1782; Mogador, Alawi Sultanate
- Died: September 7, 1854; White Sulphur Springs, Virginia

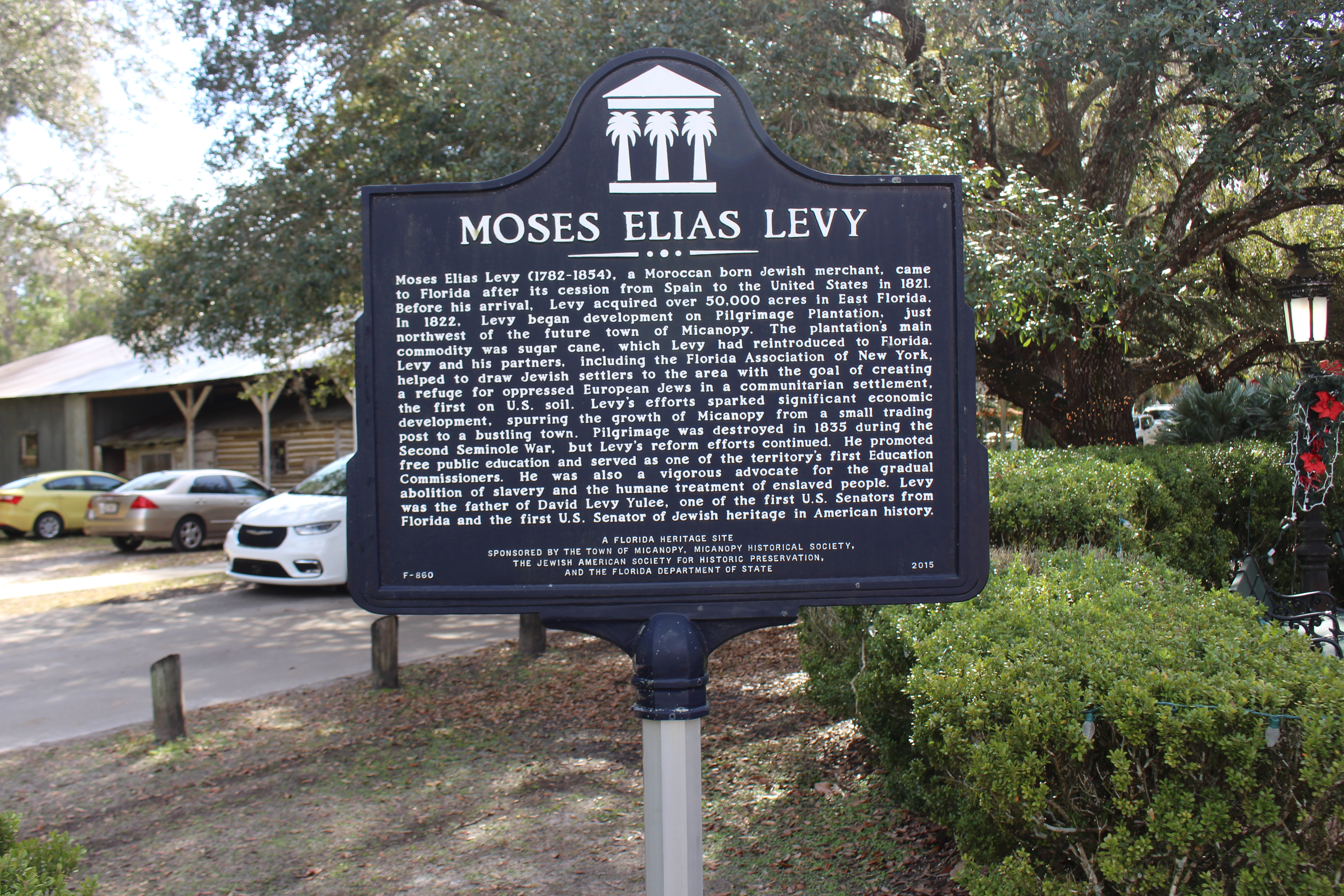
Moses Elias Levy historical marker in Micanopy, Florida (Alachua County)

Moses Elias Levy (July 10, 1782 – September 7, 1854; Hebrew: משה אליאס לוי, Arabic: موسى إلياس ليفي) was a Moroccan-born American businessman, planter, and social and religious reformer. Born into an elite Sephardic Jewish family in Morocco, Levy migrated to Gibraltar as a child and later established himself as a merchant-shipper in the Caribbean with extensive business dealings in the slave trade in England, Europe, and the Americas. His son David Levy Yulee represented Florida in the U.S. congress.

After amassing a fortune, Levy ended his business career in favor of a life centered on philanthropic causes. In 1821 he immigrated to the Florida Territory in the United States where he established a large agrarian refuge for Jews who were suffering under repression in Europe. Although the number of Jews fell far short of expectations, at least five Jewish families made their way to Levy's Pilgrimage Plantation—located in north central Florida—making this the first agrarian Jewish settlement in the United States (1822–1835). The plantation was destroyed by fire during the onset of the Second Seminole War (1835–1842). Levy, a slaveholder, was also unusual in his advocacy of the gradual emancipation of slaves. He wrote "A Plan for the Abolition of Slavery" while in London in 1828, achieving celebrity during the height of the antislavery campaign. Levy was instrumental in leading a series of inter-religious debates in elite venues where he challenged Christians to end antisemitism. Since Jews had never before entered the public sphere in England, and certainly never openly questioned the status quo, these public meetings created a furor in London. Widespread international press coverage referred to these protests as the "Extraordinary Movement of the Jews." Levy was the father of U.S. Senator from Florida David Levy Yulee.

== Early life ==
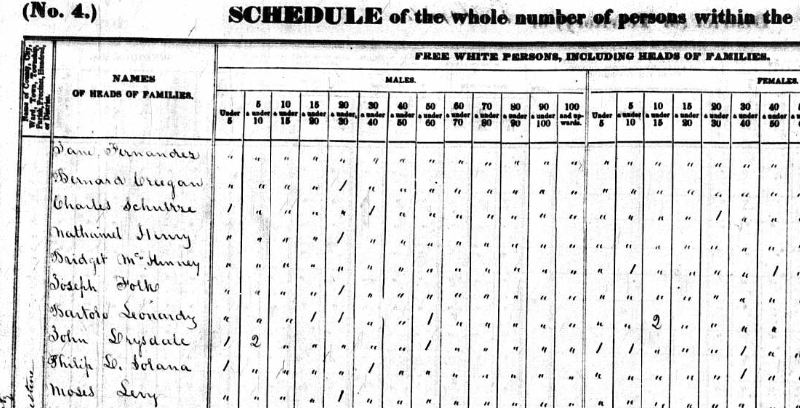
Levy listed on the 1840 Census as a free white male.

Moses Levy was the son of Eliahu Ha-Levi ibn Yuli, who served as an undersecretary to Sultan Mohammed ben Abdullah, and his wife, Rachel, who was from Tangiers, one of three wives in a plural marriage. Rachel was said to have spoken fluent Spanish. The Ibn Yuli family descend from Sephardic Jews who were expelled from Spain. They were elites who served as court officials and advisers to the sultans of Morocco. In 1790, the family fled to Gibraltar, where Moses Levy grew to young adulthood.

== Career ==
At eighteen, Levy—having dropped the Yuli surname—left the region for the Danish Virgin Islands, where he established himself as a leading merchant in Charlotte Amalie, St Thomas. During his time in the Virgin Islands, Levy engaged in the lumber business. His commercial career developed within the slave-based economy of the Caribbean, where lumber, provisions, credit, shipping, sugar, and other plantation commodities were tied to enslaved labor. Historians describe Levy as a merchant-shipper with extensive business dealings connected to the slave trade in England, Europe, and the Americas.

In 1803, he married Hannah Abendanone (1786–1872), the daughter of a local merchant, David Abendanone, and his wife, Rachel. They had four children. The youngest, David Levy Yulee (1810–1886), became the first Jew elected to the United States Senate, representing Florida. Moses Levy's firm of Levy & Benjamin pursued an extensive trade throughout the Caribbean, operating in ports and markets shaped by slavery and the movement of slave-produced goods. Philip Benjamin, his cousin and business partner, was the father of Judah P. Benjamin, future U.S. senator and Confederate Secretary of State. Levy eventually left this firm and ran his own business centered in San Juan, Puerto Rico and then Havana, Cuba, both major slave societies in the nineteenth-century Spanish Caribbean. His friendship with Alejandro Ramirez, the superintendent of Cuba and the Floridas, was influential in expanding Levy's business horizons. At one time, Levy supplied General Pablo Morillo's massive expeditionary forces in Venezuela with food, munitions, and other supplies.

Influenced by evangelical culture, in 1816, Levy underwent a spiritual epiphany, an event that was at least partially attributable to a rancorous and long-failing marriage. After a rare, formal divorce granted by the Danish king in 1818, Levy abandoned a flourishing business in favor of a life devoted to what he called the "sacred cause" of reform. His plans included an "asylum" for Jews, who were then suffering extensive abuse in post-Napoleonic Europe. Levy feared that his wealth and affluent lifestyle would lead to sin.

In 1820, he purchased 53,000 acres of land in what is now Lake City, Florida, near the St. John's River. He later bought more land in what is now Alachua County and Marion County, Florida, establishing agricultural enterprises including the sugar plantation Hope Hill and Pilgrimage Plantation. Levy was himself a slaveholder, and most of the labor at Pilgrimage was performed by enslaved people; one account states that, of about thirty people employed there, only eight or nine were white. Estimates of the number of enslaved people at Pilgrimage range from 15 to 31 at different times. Although Levy later advocated gradual emancipation and published A Plan for the Abolition of Slavery in 1828, his Caribbean wealth, sugar ventures, and Florida plantations were rooted in slave labor. His work to reintroduce sugarcane to the region has been described as hastening the expansion of slavery in southern Florida.

== Reform advocate ==
In London, Levy took on an activist role during 1827–1828 and his writing and oratory became well known in the metropolis. His initial celebrity can be largely attributed to the enthusiastic backing of influential Christians—particularly the editors of the evangelical newspaper The World as well as the leadership of the Philo-Judaean Society. Philo-Judaeans were ostensibly devoted to the material and educational welfare of London's impoverished Jews but nevertheless harbored conversionist goals. In contrast Levy sought tangible relief for his fellow Jews, most of whom dwelt in the East End slums, but steadfastly rejected the tactics of conversion. Levy also set up a plantation called "Pilgrimage", in which he set up as a haven for Jews fleeing persecution in Europe. Striking an unprecedented diplomatic balance, Levy was able to rise within the reform ranks and still retain a staunchly Jewish persona. His prominent Philo-Judaean supporters included the radical evangelical and former Tory MP Henry Drummond; the decorative glass manufacturer Apsley Pellatt; and the Anglican clergyman Hugh McNeile (also M'Neile). Levy's first major address before the organization, held at Freemasons' Hall in May 1827, stressed the commonality of the Judaeo-Christian tradition, condemned antisemitism, and challenged Christians to end "the persecution of contempt." (The World (London), 20 June 1827) Positive press coverage presented Levy as an admired orator, philanthropist, and promoter of inter-faith relations. Millennialist zeal contributed to Levy's notoriety and some viewed his actions as "extraordinary signs of the times" and proof that "something most singular is approaching" (ibid., 9 January 1828). Previously, any public notice among Anglo-Jewry was purposely avoided and debates with gentiles were considered anathema—a passive strategy that emerged after centuries of Old World oppression.

Levy's agenda for reform also included the gradual abolition of slavery and he frequently expounded the subject in England. His pamphlet A Plan for the Abolition of Slavery, Consistently with the Interests of All Parties Concerned (1828) was praised for addressing pragmatic issues that other abolitionists avoided. Despite the publication's anonymity Levy's authorship was well known in reform circles. His anti-slavery philosophy evolved from his background as a sugar planter in the New World—practical experience that few abolitionists could equal. From his perspective immediate emancipation would be calamitous, since blacks were not only psychologically injured by slavery but were also hampered by illiteracy. Consequently, Levy—an actual slave-owner in Florida—advocated for universal education for slave children, a system that would stress reading, writing, and science fundamentals as well as farming skills. Freedom would be awarded at the age of 21, and each family would be given land for cultivation. Levy envisaged a "united association" of philanthropic businesses that would put his tenets into practice.

Despite Levy's rather utopian outlook, his ideas received wide recognition. The London Literary Chronicle recommended his anti-slavery pamphlet "to the serious attention of the legislature and the public" (cited in The World, 20 August 1828); The World devoted a lengthy column to the treatise, in which the author's 'great benevolence of soul, and deep and enlightened piety' (ibid., 9 July 1828) were particularly stressed; and a new anti-slavery society, organized at Salvador House, Bishopsgate, London, took up Levy's far-ranging abolitionist creed.

Levy chaired a series of impassioned and much publicized "public meetings of the Jews" held at the City of London Tavern. These meetings condemned Jewish persecution in Russia—then one of Britain's prime military allies. He was a prolific writer, contributing articles and letters to the newspapers almost daily. His Letters Concerning the Present Condition of the Jews, being a Correspondence between Mr. Forster and Mr. Levy(1829) was published in London with an evangelical co-author, John Forster of Southend. Levy can be seen as a Jewish social activist without parallel in early nineteenth-century Britain. His outsider status allowed for a certain freedom of action, but his transnational standing also marginalized his contributions after he returned to the United States in the summer of 1828. Full recognition has only been recently accorded to him by historians.

== Return to Florida ==
Upon his return to the slave-holding South, Levy curtailed his abolitionism. But other elements of his reform agenda could be safely broached, and from his residence in St. Augustine, Florida, he led the first campaign for free education in public schools in the territory. His appointment as education commissioner by the governor (1831) reflected a growing acceptance of Levy's call to action. However, the onset of the Second Seminole War (1835) and the resultant devastation put an end to his reform career—as well as his communal farming settlement, Pilgrimage—and, in combination with legal challenges to his extensive land holdings, caused great economic hardship. By 1849 Levy had regained much of his former wealth after his claim to nearly 100,000 acres was validated by state and federal courts.

== See also ==
- Robert Owen
- Mordecai Manuel Noah
