= Micanopy, Florida =

Town in the state of Florida, United States

- Town
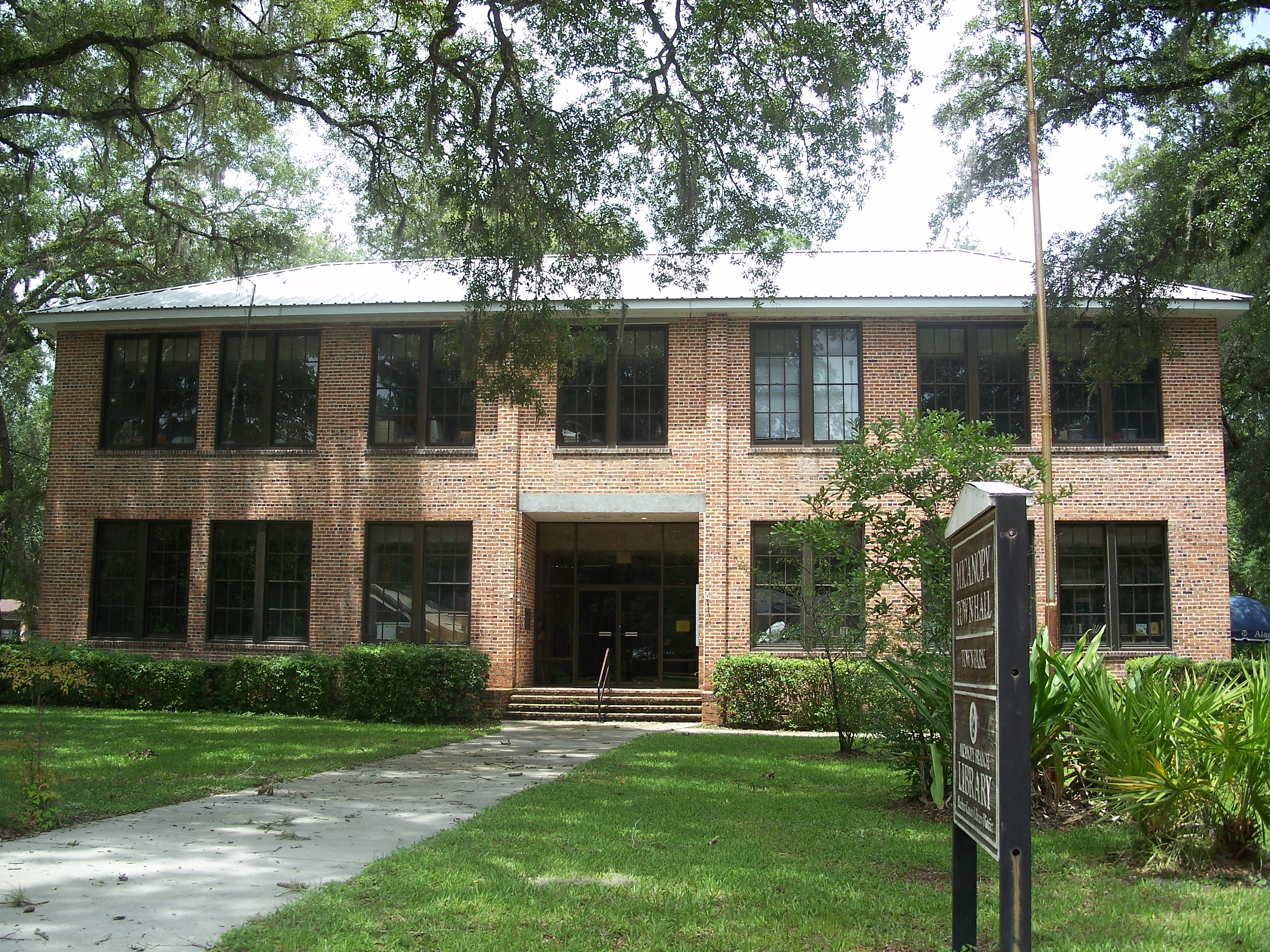
- Micanopy Town Hall and Library

- Seal
- Motto: "The Town that Time Forgot"
- Location in Alachua County and the state of Florida
- Coordinates: 29°30′12″N 82°16′51″W
- Country: United States
- State: Florida
- County: Alachua
- Founded by Native Americans (Cuscowilla): c. 1539–1817
- Settled in Spanish East Florida (Wantons): c. 1817–March 1821
- Settled in the Florida Territory (Wanton's): February 12, 1823–1834
- Unincorporated in the Florida Territory (Micanopy): 1834
- Incorporated in the Florida Territory (Town of Micanopy): 1837
- Reincorporated in the State of Florida (Town of Micanopy): September 15, 1858

Government
  - Type: Mayor-Commission
  - Mayor: Jiana Bradshaw Williams
  - Mayor Pro Tem: Kevin Putansu
  - Commissioners: Ken Wessberg, Judy Galloway, and David Massey
  - Town Administrator and Town Clerk: Sara S. Samario
  - Town Attorney: S. Scott Walker
- Elevation: 118 ft (36 m)

Population (2020)
  - Total: 648
- Time zone: UTC-5 (Eastern (EST))
  - Summer (DST): UTC-4 (EDT)
- ZIP code: 32667
- Area code: 352
- FIPS code: 12-45225
- GNIS feature ID: 2406153
- Website: www.micanopytown.com

Micanopy (/ˌmɪkəˈnoʊpi/ MIK-ə-NOH-pee) is a town in Alachua County, Florida, United States, located south of Gainesville. It is part of the Gainesville, Florida Metropolitan Statistical Area. The population as of the 2020 census was 648, up from 600 at the 2010 census.

It is the oldest continuously inhabited community in the interior of Florida. Its downtown area, the Micanopy Historic District, is listed on the National Register of Historic Places. This municipality contains a number of antique stores, several restaurants, a library, a firehouse, and a post office. Its motto is "The Town that Time Forgot."

== History ==
A historical marker in the area notes that Spanish explorer Hernando de Soto recorded finding a village of the Timucua portion of the Potano tribe located near by in 1539. In 1774, the American naturalist William Bartram recorded his impressions of a proto-Seminole village named "Cuscowilla" (sometimes spelled "Cuscawilla").

By the time Spain ceded Spanish Florida's provinces, (East Florida and West Florida,) to the U.S. in 1821, the newly constructed hamlet of Micanopy became the first distinct United States town in the Florida Territory. One of the early settlers of the area was Moses Elias Levy, a wealthy Jewish businessman and philanthropist who was involved in West Indies shipping and other interests. He immigrated to the United States in 1820 and founded "Pilgrimage", the first Jewish communal settlement in the United States located two miles from town.

The Micanopy community was built under the auspices of the Florida Association of New York (the earliest Florida development corporation, headquartered in Manhattan). Chief Micanopy lived about 60 miles (97 km) south in present-day Sumter County. In 1821, when the territorial village was developed, a faction of Miccosukee Indians lived in the immediate area. In the early days, the frontier village was referred to as "Wantons" (sometime spelled "Wanton's" or called "Wanton"), after one of the original settlers. The historian C. S. Monaco has suggested that the town was named after Micanopy "to appease the chief and acknowledge his original authority over the land." And in 1834, the community was renamed "Micanopy".

The "Historic Micanopy" Sign

Both Fort Defiance (1835–1836) and Fort Micanopy (1837–1843) were located here during the Second Seminole War. Some of the bloodiest battles of that war took place along the road southwest from Fort Micanopy to Fort Wacahoota, just inside modern Alachua County. A recent archaeological study has verified both forts as well as the location of two battlefields within the town limits: the Battle of Micanopy and the Battle of Welika Pond (1836).

The Town of Micanopy was officially incorporated as a municipality in 1837, when Florida was still an American territory. When Florida became an American state, the town was reincorporated on September 15, 1858.

Prior to the 1880s, produce from Micanopy, including citrus, was carried to the southern shore of Lake Alachua and taken by boat to the northern shore, which was served by branch lines from the Transit Railroad. In 1883, the Florida Southern Railway built a branch line to Micanopy from its line running from Rochelle (southeast of Gainesville) to Ocala. In 1895, a rail line was laid from Micanopy by the Gainesville and Gulf Railroad, and by 1889, reached to Irvine and Fairfield in Marion County, and Sampson City in Bradford County, where it connected to the Atlantic, Suwannee River and Gulf Railway and the Georgia Southern and Florida Railroad. The railroads spurred farming in the surrounding area. It had a population of over 600 in 1880. In the 1920s, cars crossed Paynes Prairie on the Micanopy Causeway.

== Geography ==
The Town of Micanopy is located on the southern edge of Alachua County.

According to the United States Census Bureau, the town has a total area of 1.1 square miles (2.8 km^{2}), of which 1.0 square mile (2.6 km^{2}) is land and 0.1 square miles (0.26 km^{2}) (4.63%) is water.

=== Climate ===
The climate in this area is characterized by hot, humid summers and generally mild winters. According to the Köppen climate classification, the Town of Micanopy has a humid subtropical climate zone (Cfa).

== Demographics ==
Historical population
Census	Pop.	Note	%±
1880	432		—
1890	494		14.4%
1900	645		30.6%
1910	613		−5.0%
1920	546		−10.9%
1930	725		32.8%
1940	720		−0.7%
1950	612		−15.0%
1960	658		7.5%
1970	759		15.3%
1980	737		−2.9%
1990	612		−17.0%
2000	653		6.7%
2010	600		−8.1%
2020	648		8.0%
U.S. Decennial Census

=== 2010 and 2020 census ===
Micanopy racial composition (Hispanics excluded from racial categories) (NH = Non-Hispanic)
Race	Pop 2010	Pop 2020	% 2010	% 2020
White (NH)	435	474	72.50%	73.15%
Black or African American (NH)	133	100	22.17%	15.43%
Native American or Alaska Native (NH)	4	1	0.67%	0.15%
Asian (NH)	1	3	0.17%	0.46%
Pacific Islander or Native Hawaiian (NH)	0	0	0.00%	0.00%
Some other race (NH)	0	4	0.00%	0.62%
Two or more races/Multiracial (NH)	10	36	1.67%	5.56%
Hispanic or Latino (any race)	17	30	2.83%	4.63%
Total	600	648		

As of the 2020 United States census, there were 648 people, 201 households, and 111 families residing in the town.

As of the 2010 United States census, there were 600 people, 358 households, and 205 families residing in the town.

=== 2000 census ===
As of the census of 2000, there were 653 people, 302 households, and 172 families residing in the town. The population density was 631.4 inhabitants per square mile (243.8/km^{2}). There were 346 housing units at an average density of 334.6 per square mile (129.2/km^{2}). The racial makeup of the town was 68.30% White, 28.94% African American, 0.61% Native American, 0.31% Asian, 0.31% from other races, and 1.53% from two or more races. Hispanic or Latino of any race were 1.99% of the population.

In 2000, there were 302 households, out of which 21.5% had children under the age of 18 living with them, 36.8% were married couples living together, 15.6% had a female householder with no husband present, and 43.0% were non-families. 35.4% of all households were made up of individuals, and 12.9% had someone living alone who was 65 years of age or older. The average household size was 2.16 and the average family size was 2.74.

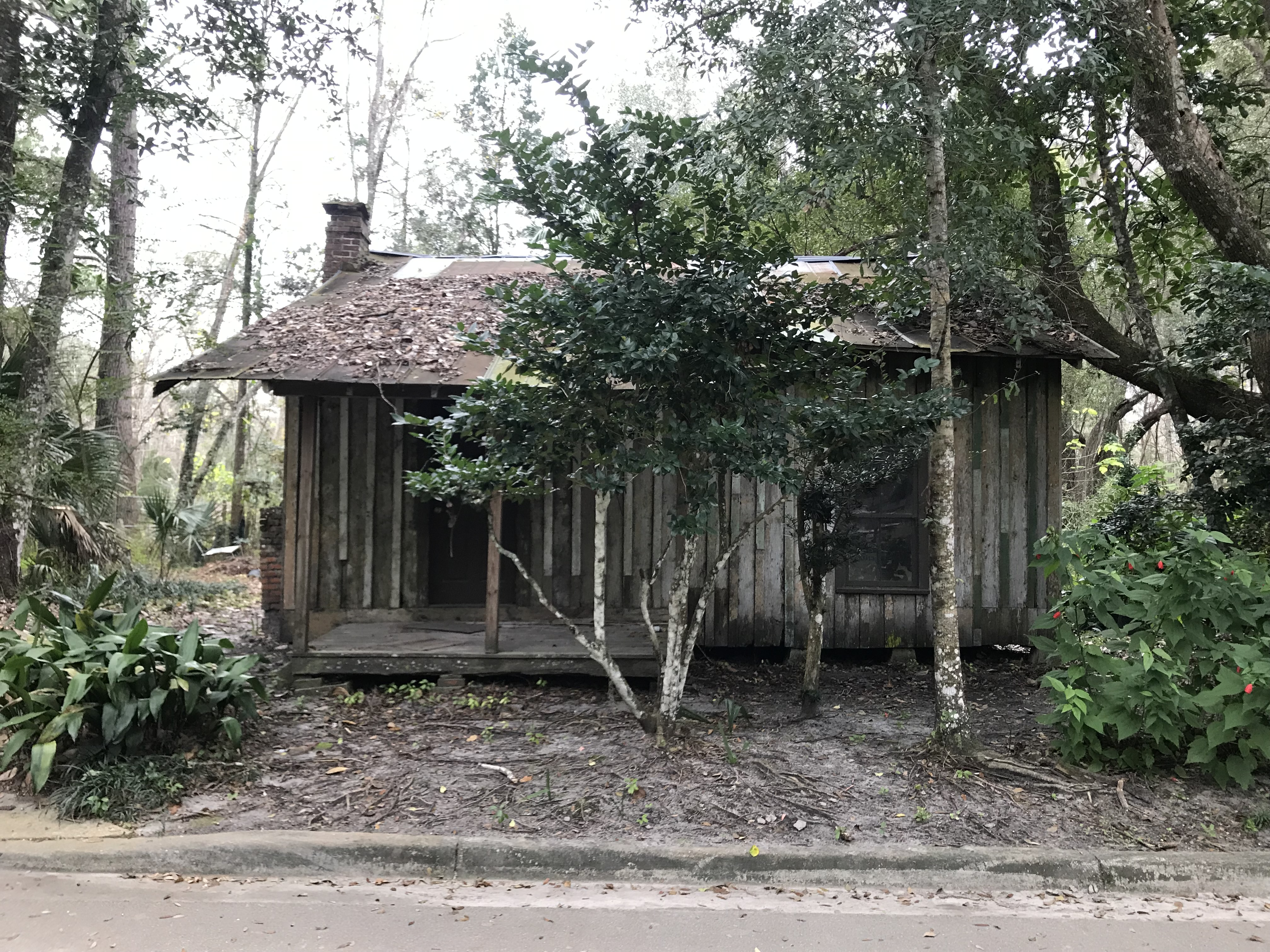
The oldest home in Micanopy that was built by Black people for their family; now sits abandoned

In 2000, in the town, the population was spread out, with 19.8% under the age of 18, 4.7% from 18 to 24, 29.6% from 25 to 44, 31.7% from 45 to 64, and 14.2% who were 65 years of age or older. The median age was 43 years. For every 100 females, there were 94.9 males. For every 100 females age 18 and over, there were 85.8 males.

In 2000, the median income for a household in the town was $27,778, and the median income for a family was $38,611. Males had a median income of $30,938 versus $20,294 for females. The per capita income for the town was $20,433. About 3.0% of families and 15.7% of the population were below the poverty line, including 17.8% of those under age 18 and 21.3% of those age 65 or over.

== Arts and culture ==
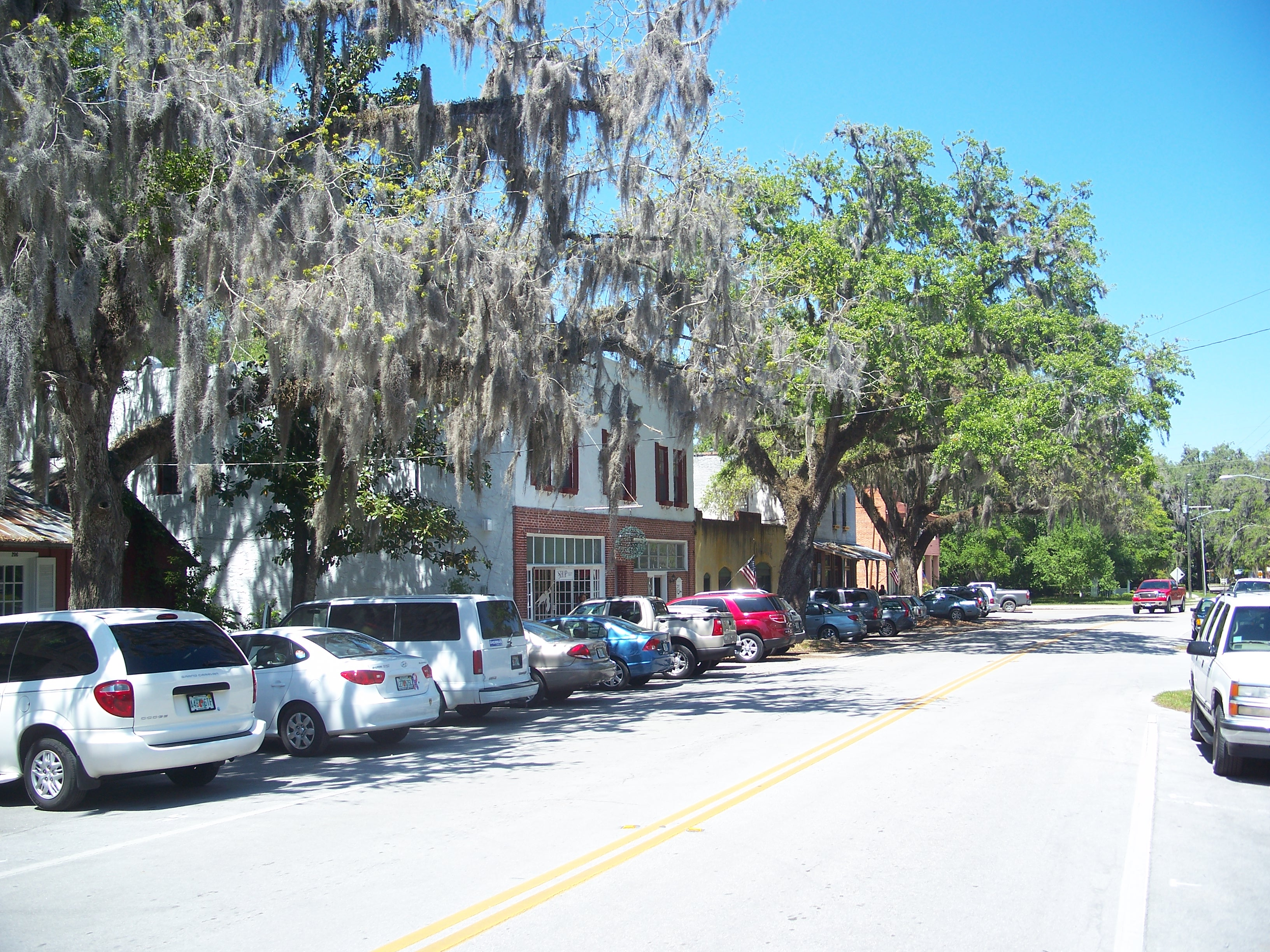
Micanopy Historic District

Micanopy hosts an annual autumn art festival, in which both local and non-local artists participate.

Micanopy Historical Society Museum, housed downtown in the Thrasher Warehouse, features displays of local and town history that range from the early Native Americans, to naturalist William Bartram's travels in the region, to the Seminole Wars and the Civil War. Built in 1896, the warehouse was served by a branch of the Atlantic Coast Line Railroad until the 1950s and was placed on the National Register of Historic Places in 1983.

The Alachua County Library District operates a branch library in the town.

The downtown Micanopy Historic District was listed on the National Register of Historic Places in 1983.

Paynes Prairie Preserve State Park is a major source of outdoor recreation for not only the town, but the entire county itself.

== Education ==
Micanopy is served by the Alachua County Public Schools. The town only has two schools within its borders, both of which are charter schools: Micanopy Area Cooperative School (elementary) and Micanopy Academy (secondary).

== Media ==
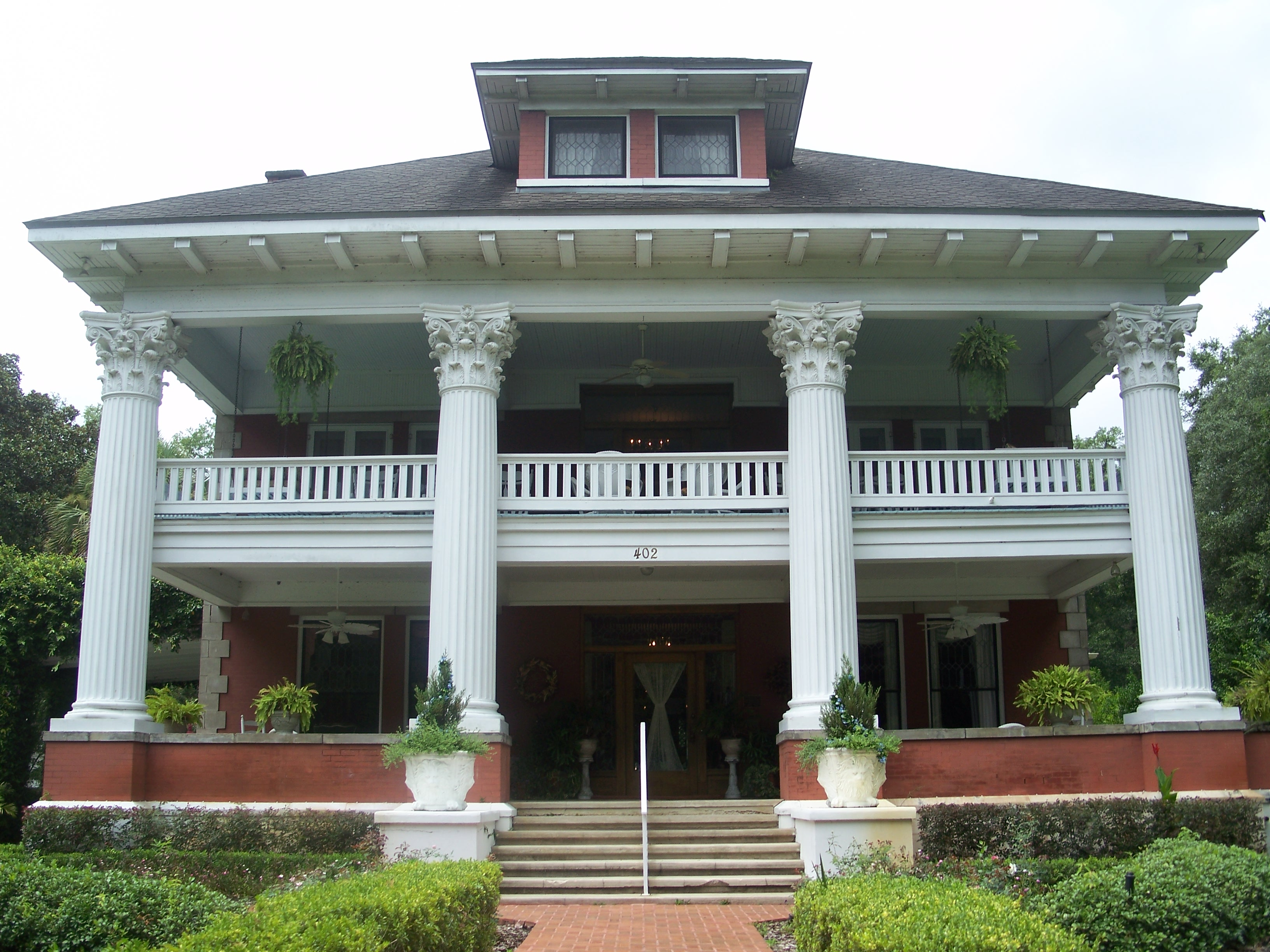
Herlong House, a Bed & Breakfast

Micanopy is mentioned in the Tom Petty song "A Mind with a Heart of Its Own" from the album Full Moon Fever. Petty humorously sings that he's "been to Brooker, been to Micanopy, been to St. Louis too, I've been all around the world!"

Micanopy is noted in the chorus of the John Anderson song "Seminole Wind" from the album Seminole Wind. The song is covered by James Taylor on the album James Taylor Covers.

The film Doc Hollywood, based on the book What? Dead…Again? by Neil B. Shulman and starring Michael J. Fox, was filmed in Micanopy.

On September 27, 1975, the variety show Hee Haw saluted Micanopy.

== Notable people ==
- Archie Carr, zoologist and author, and his wife Marjorie Harris Carr, also a conservationist.
- Stephen F. Eisenman, art historian and environmentalist
- John Horse, Black Seminole leader, lived here before the Seminole Wars and removal to Indian Territory
- Moses Elias Levy, businessman and philanthropist, founded Pilgrimage and Micanopy
- River Phoenix, actor, cremated ashes scattered here at family ranch

== See also ==
- Church of the Mediator
