= Matheson History Museum =

History museum in Gainesville, Florida

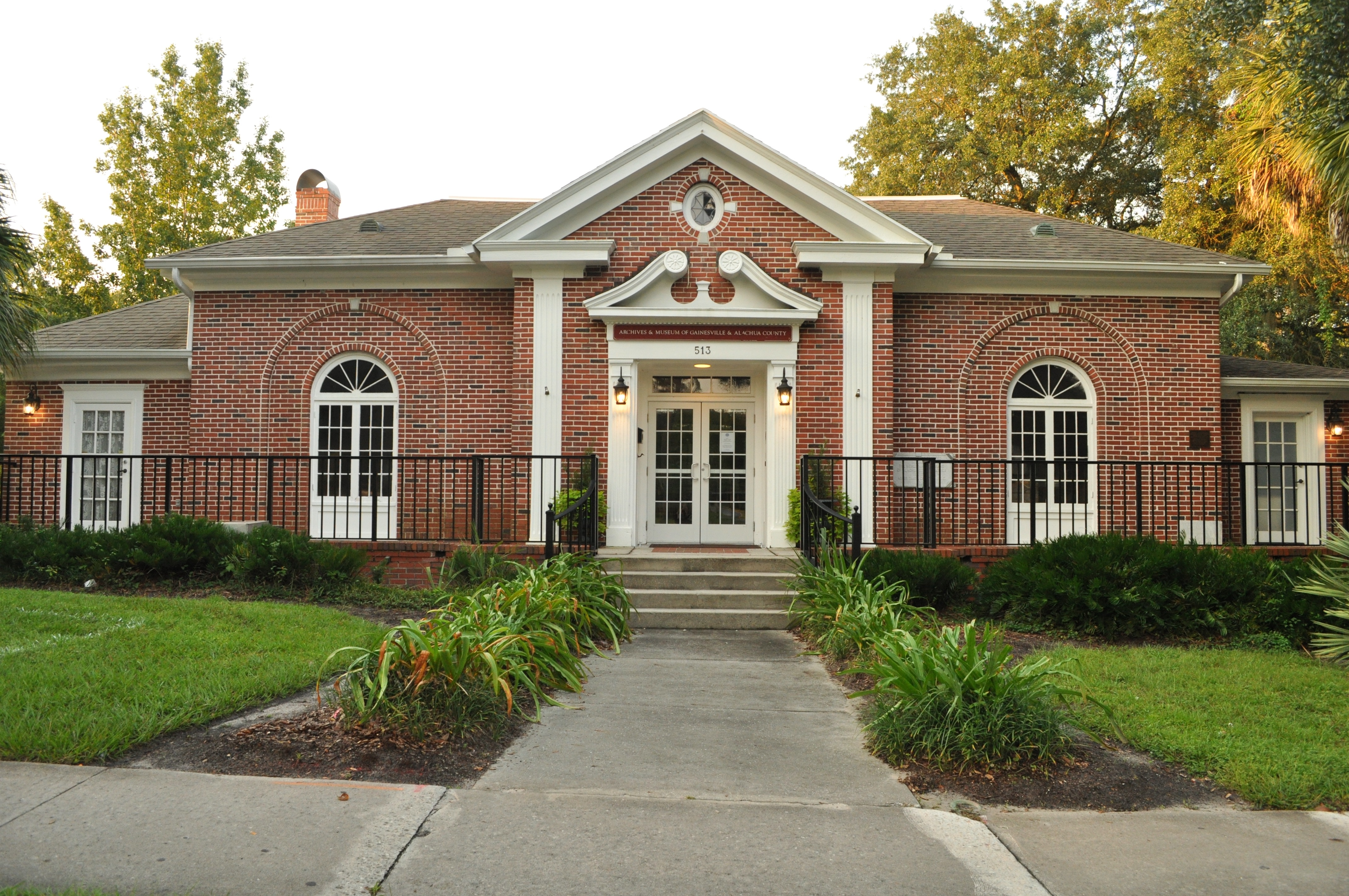

- Gainesville, Florida
- Established: 1994
- Location: 513 East University Avenue, Gainesville, Florida
- Coordinates: 29.651800°N 82.320172°W
- Type: History
- Website: mathesonmuseum.org

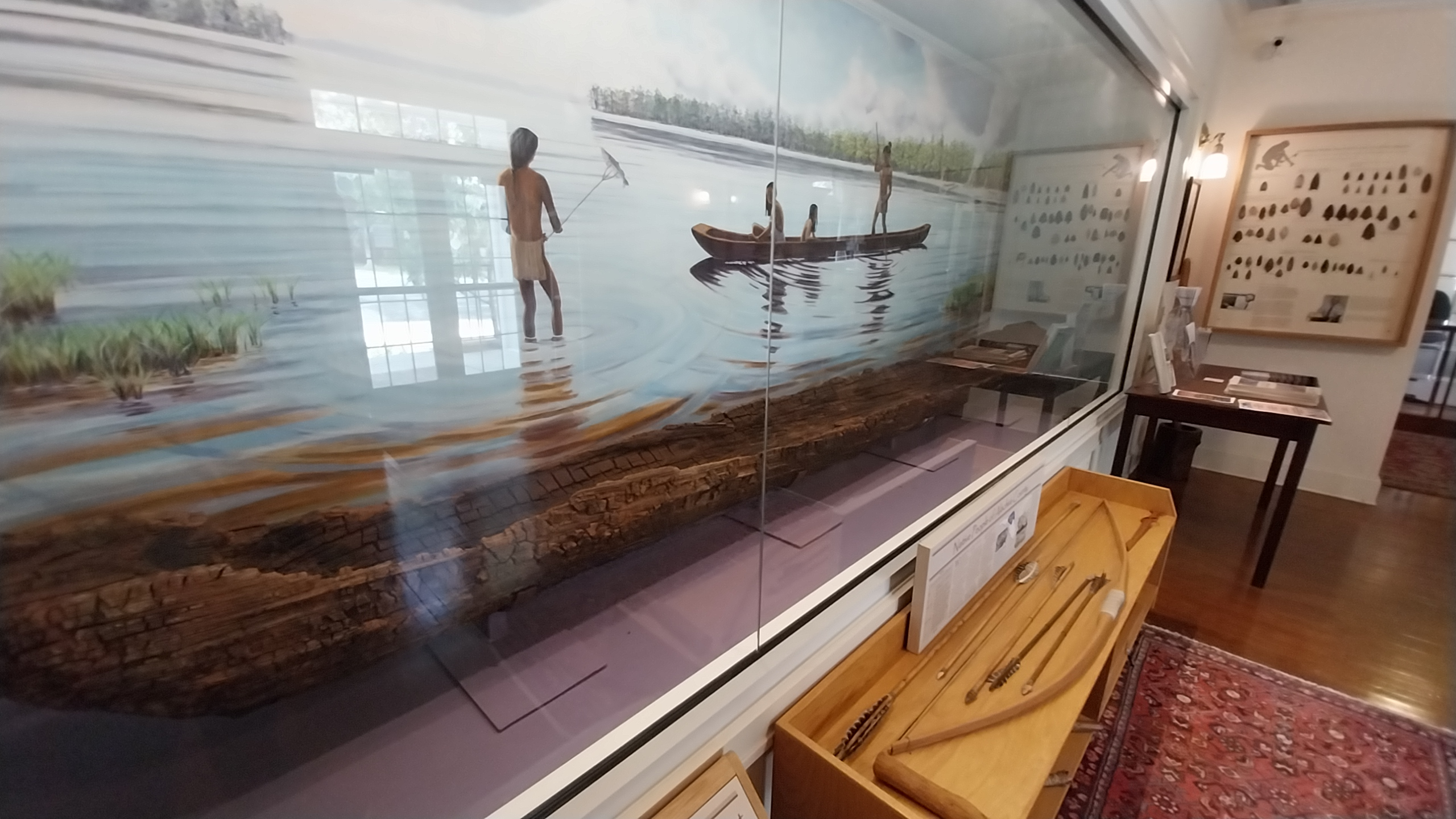
Timucuan Canoe from 420-570 AD located at the Matheson History Museum

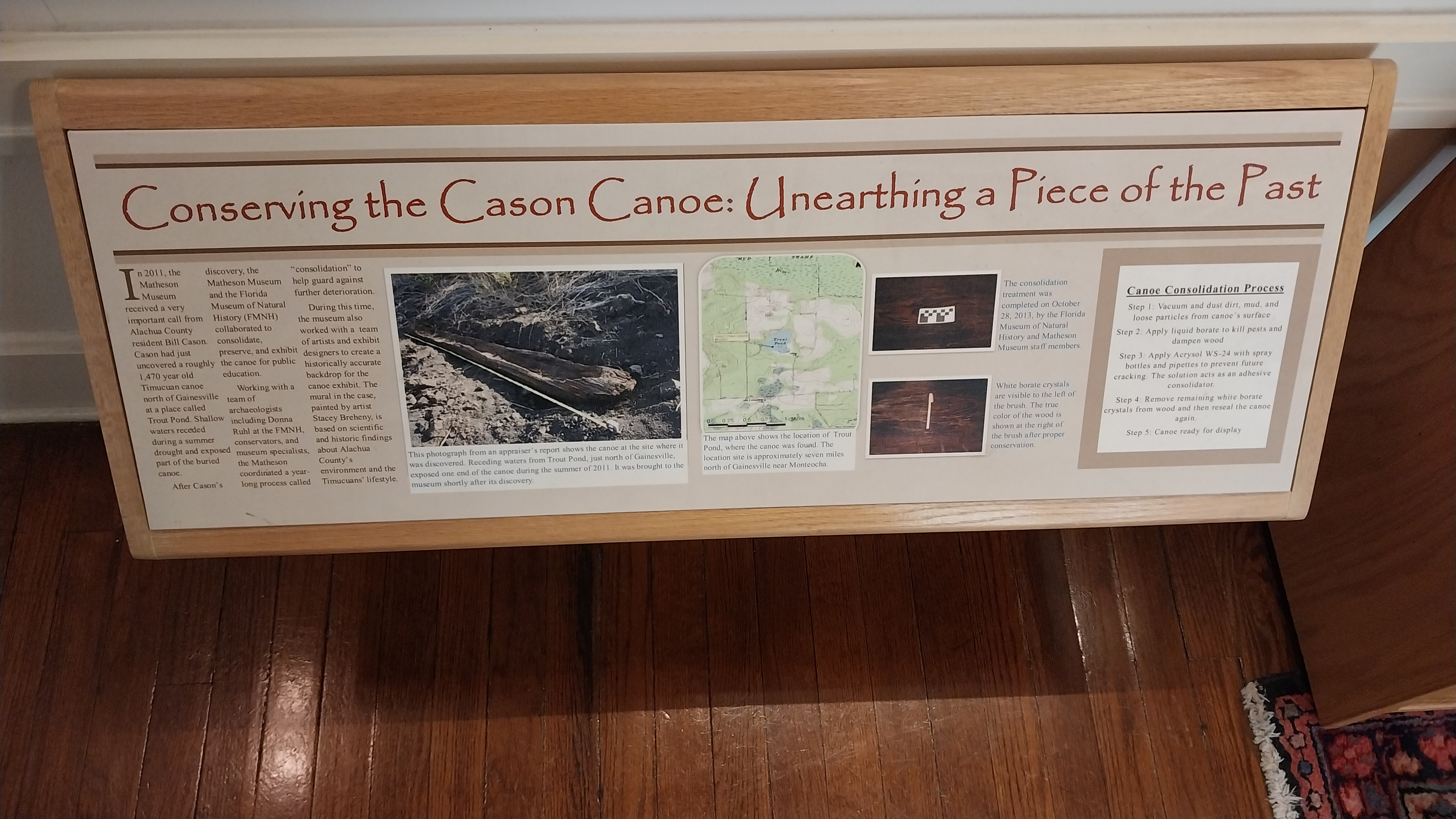
Informational plaque accompanying the Timucuan canoe display describing it's finding and preservation

1867 Matheson House

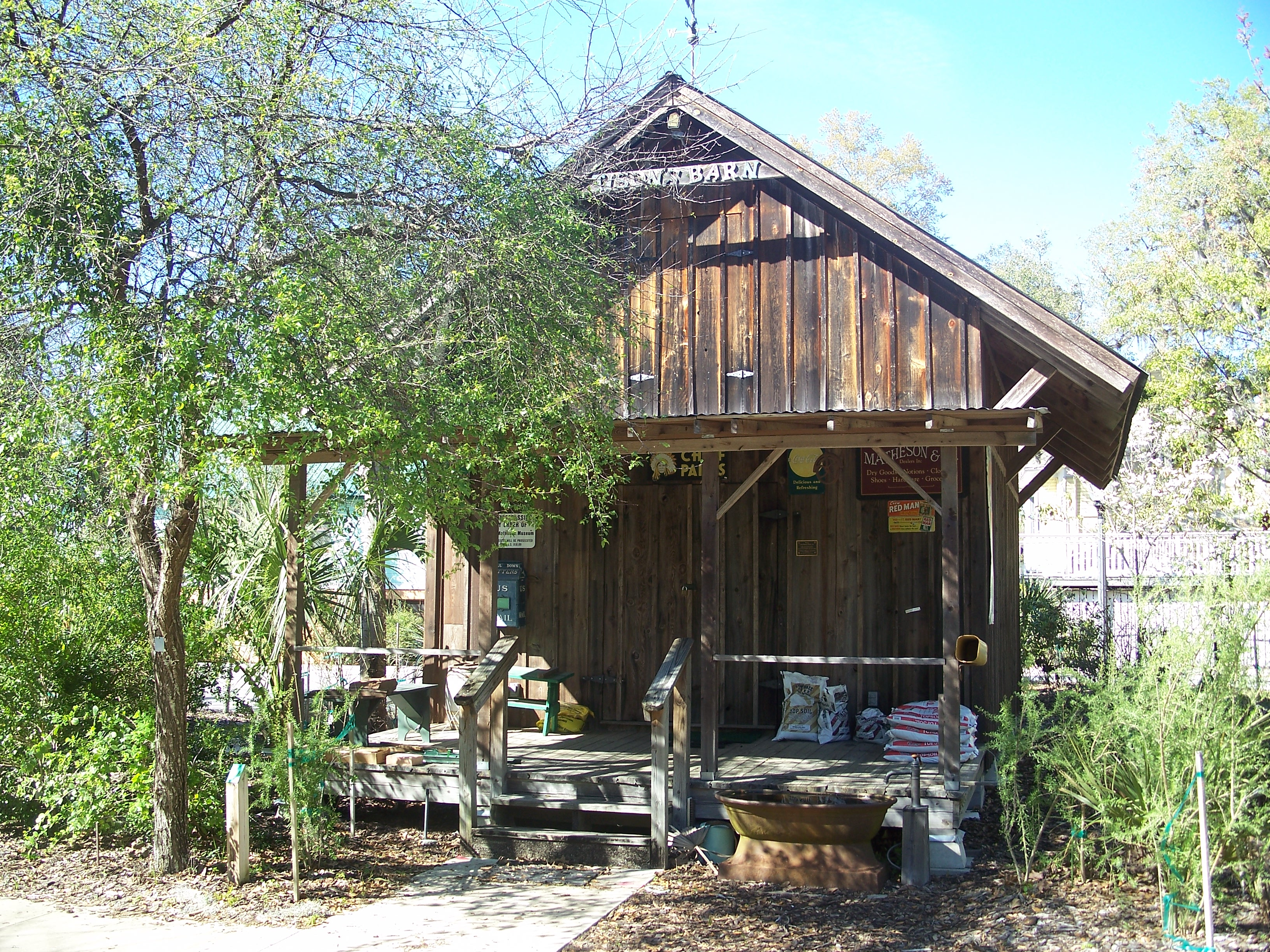
The Tison Tool Barn is located behind the historic Matheson House.

The Matheson History Museum Complex is located in Gainesville, Florida. It includes the Matheson History Museum, the Matheson Library & Archives, the 1867 Matheson House, and the Tison Tool Barn.

== Museum Complex ==
=== Matheson History Museum ===
The Matheson History Museum building, formerly an American Legion Hall and officially opened as a museum in 1994, houses the bulk of the museum complex's exhibitions and programs. The front of the building has a gift shop and a recreation of the Matheson Dry Goods Store that used to exist on Alachua Avenue (now University Avenue). Another permanent exhibit was added to the front of the building in 2015 featuring a canoe from the Timucua Native American tribe that inhabited North Central Florida The canoe was originally discovered in 2011 by Gainesville resident Bill Cason. Cason was north of Gainesville at Trout Pond when the receded waters from the summer had exposed the canoe. Recognizing the artifact he called the Matheson Museum to report his find. The Matheson collaborated with the Florida Museum of Natural History (FMNH) to recover and preserve the canoe. The display case currently showing the canoe features a backdrop mural of historically accurate Timucuan life painted by the artist Stacy Breheny.

The main gallery consists of a permanent display of local and Florida history along the east wall, with the remainder of the space devoted to rotating temporary exhibitions. The back of the building contains the Mary Ann Cofrin Exhibit Hall, where additional temporary exhibitions are on display.

=== 1867 Matheson House ===
Originally owned and built by the Matheson family, from which the museum takes its name, this house was built in 1867 and is the third oldest house in Gainesville (the Bailey House was completed in 1854 and the Haile Homestead in 1856). It was home to James Douglas Matheson and his wife, Augusta Florida Steele Matheson, daughter of Florida pioneer Augustus Steele, founder of Hillsborough County and Cedar Key. Their son, Christopher Matheson, was Gainesville's longest-serving mayor. Chris's widow, Sarah Hamilton Matheson, initially deeded the house to the Alachua County Historical Society, of which she was a founding member, and later to the Matheson Historical Center (now the Matheson History Museum). Sarah Matheson, who died in 1996, was one of the original board members and founders of the museum and was also an early president of the Alachua County Historical Society. The society originated in 1967 and later merged with the museum under the new name of Alachua County Historic Trust: Matheson Museum, Inc. In 2014, the museum changed its name to the Matheson History Museum. The Matheson House contains original furniture, artwork and artifacts from antebellum and Victorian era Florida.

=== Tison Tool Barn ===
The Tison Tool barn was first constructed between 1992 & 1993 by John Mason Tison Jr. at his address of 1842 NW 7th Place in Gainesville Florida . When the barn was donated to the museum in 1998 it had to be dismantled entirely. The materials were then transported and reconstructed next to the Matheson House by Geoffrey O’Meara, a local contractor. The reconstruction was marked with a plaque with the quote “The only barn raised twice”.

The barn itself consists of two floors with the main floor being used to house displays. The display on the first floor consists of tools that originally belonged to the John Mason Tison Jr. or were donated by the community. Through these donations the number of tools total close to 1200 objects. The second floor of the barn is currently used for storage purposes.

=== Sweetwater Park ===
Located directly behind the museum and maintained jointly by the Matheson History Museum and the City of Gainesville, Sweetwater Park is free and open to the public.

=== Matheson Library and Archives ===
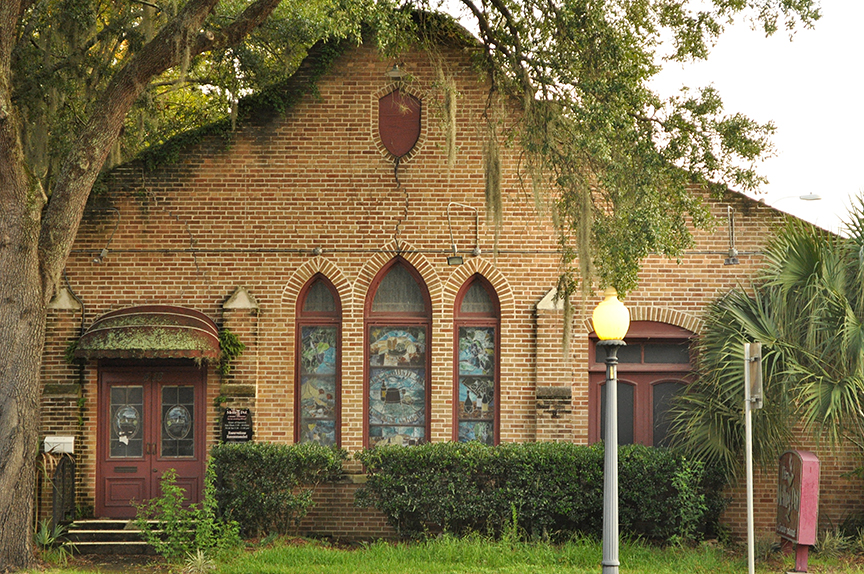
The former Melting Pot restaurant building was restored through a historic preservation grant and private donations and is now the Matheson Library and Archives.

Purchased by the museum in the summer of 2014, this building was originally a tabernacle church built in 1933. From 1976 to 1980 retired cardiologist and Matheson co-founder Dr. Mark Barrow and his wife, Mary, operated an antique store in the building. In 1982 they sold the building to Orlando investors, and from 1982 to 2009 it was a Melting Pot fondue restaurant. Originally operated by Hope Meucci, it was one of the first Melting Pot fondue restaurants in the nation. The Matheson History Museum received a $300,000 historic preservation grant from the Florida Department of State, Division of Historical Resources, along with contributions from private donors, to transform the building into a library and archives for the museum's local history collections. The Matheson Library & Archives was completed in 2017. It houses the Matheson History Museum's collections, including local and Florida artifacts, books and vertical files with images and information on a variety of topics in local and Florida history.

== See also ==
- List of museums in Florida
