= Doc Hollywood =

1991 American romantic comedy film

- Theatrical release poster
- Directed by: Michael Caton-Jones
- Screenplay by: Jeffrey Price; Peter S. Seaman; Daniel Pyne
- Adaptation by: Laurian Leggett
- Based on: What? Dead...Again? by Neil B. Shulman
- Produced by: Deborah D. Johnson; Susan Solt
- Starring: Michael J. Fox; Julie Warner; Barnard Hughes; Woody Harrelson; David Ogden Stiers; Frances Sternhagen; Bridget Fonda
- Cinematography: Michael Chapman
- Edited by: Priscilla Nedd-Friendly
- Music by: Carter Burwell
- Distributed by: Warner Bros.
- Release date: August 2, 1991
- Running time: 103 minutes
- Country: United States
- Language: English
- Budget: $20 million
- Box office: $54.8 million

Doc Hollywood is a 1991 American romantic comedy film directed by Michael Caton-Jones and written by Daniel Pyne along with Jeffrey Price and Peter S. Seaman, based on Neil B. Shulman's book What? Dead...Again? The film stars Michael J. Fox, Julie Warner, Barnard Hughes, Woody Harrelson, David Ogden Stiers, Frances Sternhagen, and Bridget Fonda.

The film was shot on location in Micanopy, Florida. Doc Hollywood was released by Warner Bros. on August 2, 1991. The film received mixed to positive reviews from critics and grossed $54.8 million against a $20 million budget.

== Plot ==
Having completed his medical residency in a Washington, D.C., hospital, Dr. Benjamin "Ben" Stone begins driving to Beverly Hills for a job interview with noted plastic surgeon Dr. Halberstrom. His colleagues and friends think he is wasting his life doing plastic surgery instead of real medicine. While passing through the small town of Grady, South Carolina, Ben crashes into a fence whilst trying to avoid hitting a cow. The fence belongs to Judge Evans, who sentences him to 32 hours of community service (increased from 16 hours due to Ben's anger) at the town's medical clinic, Grady Memorial Hospital.

Mayor Nick Nicholson and the town's reception committee meet Ben, hoping to hire him to replace the "Old and wholly unpleasant" Dr. Aurelius Hogue, who is planning to retire. While his 1956 Porsche Speedster is being repaired, Ben tends to patients and flirts with ambulance driver and law student Vialula (better known as "Lou"), a single mother of a four-year-old daughter. Local insurance agent Hank Gordon also courts Lou, while Nancy Lee, the mayor's daughter, pursues Ben.

The town's residents begin to warm to Ben, and he in turn starts to enjoy small-town life. Ben tells Lou that he was born and raised in a small town in Indiana, and went off to college in Washington, D.C., for a better life. Dr. Hogue, initially dismissive of Ben as being too young and too inexperienced, changes his mind when he has a heart attack and Ben saves his life. Grateful, Hogue privately calls Halberstrom explaining Ben's delay due to his enforced community service (which he explains as being "volunteer work"), while Judge Evans pardons Ben from his remaining sentence.

On the eve of Ben's departure, he shares an intimate evening with Lou. Unwilling to exploit the situation or incite Hank's jealousy, Ben secretly leaves town at night. Near the town's reservoir, Ben happens upon a local man whose wife is in labor inside their car. After a short hesitation, he stops to help. During the delivery, Ben's Porsche is once again damaged when a fatigued carnival truck driver crashes into it.

Ben prepares to leave the next day, as the community has chipped in and bought him a plane ticket to Los Angeles. Lou, not wanting Ben to waste his talents in a small town, hides her feelings for him, and says she is marrying Hank.

Dr. Halberstrom hires Ben based on Hogue's recommendation. However, Beverly Hills's superficiality soon leaves Ben, who grew up in a small town, feeling depressed and isolated. A few weeks later, Hank and Nancy Lee arrive in Los Angeles, bringing Ben's repaired car with them. After Hank tells Ben that he and Lou broke off their engagement, Ben returns to Grady and reconciles with Lou.

== Cast ==
- Michael J. Fox as Dr. Benjamin "Ben" Stone, an aspiring surgeon.
- Julie Warner as Vialula/"Lou", a tomboyish ambulance driver living in Grady who is a single mother and is a law student.
- Barnard Hughes as Dr. Aurelius Hogue, an elderly curmudgeon doctor in Grady.
- Woody Harrelson as Hank Gordon, Grady's local insurance salesman.
- David Ogden Stiers as Mayor Nick Nicholson, the mayor of Grady who is also the owner of the town's café.
- Frances Sternhagen as Lillian, a member of Grady's welcoming committee.
- Bridget Fonda as Nancy Lee Nicholson, the daughter of Nick Nicholson.
- Mel Winkler as Melvin, a mechanic charged with the duty to restore Ben's car.
- Helen Martin as Maddie
- Roberts Blossom as Judge Evans, the judge who sentences Ben to community service.
- Tom Lacy as Cotton
- Macon McCalman as Aubrey Draper
- Raye Birk as Simone Tidwell
- Eyde Byrde as Nurse Packer, Grady's residential nurse who oversees Ben's community service.
- George Hamilton as Dr. Halberstrom, a Beverly Hills doctor.
- Time Winters as Kyle Owens
- K.T. Vogt as Mary Owens

== Production ==
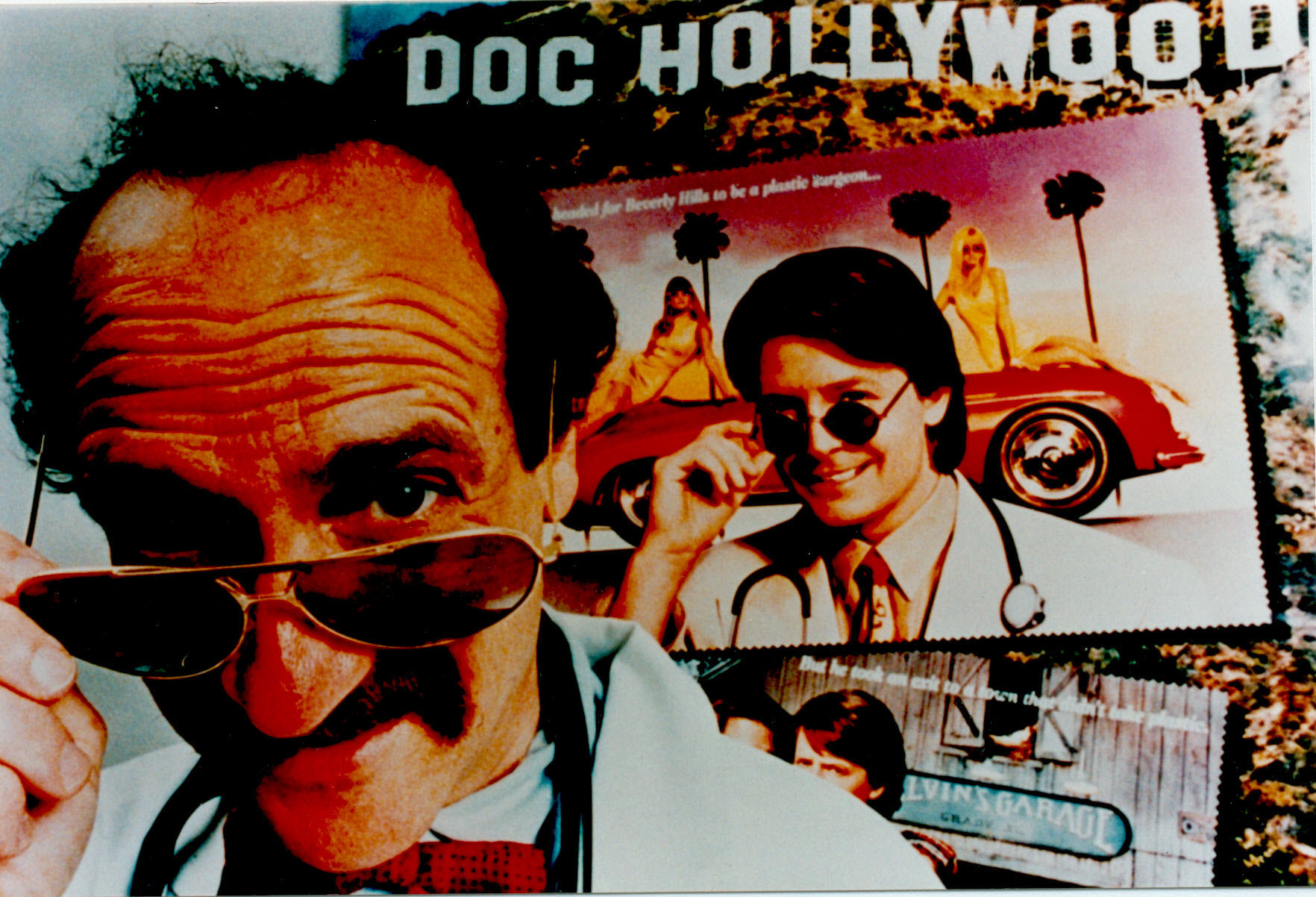
Neil B. Shulman posing in front of a Doc Hollywood poster.

The film is based on the book What? Dead…Again? by Neil B. Shulman, about his time as a doctor in rural Georgia. He was an associate producer on the film.

Daniel Pyne was hired to rewrite the film as Michael J. Fox had admired Pyne's script for The Hard Way. Pyne said, "It was a dream re-write. It was a dry, badly structured doctor comedy, and I pushed it more toward the romantic side, with a touch of Local Hero. Michael committed to that draft, and I did another immediate polish. What wound up thirteen months later on the screen was as much mine as anyone's."

The budget was $20 million. The story location was moved from Georgia to South Carolina but filmed on location in Florida in the towns of Micanopy and McIntosh, south of Gainesville. Further filming took place in Los Angeles.

== Soundtrack ==
The film's soundtrack features the score by Carter Burwell and Chesney Hawkes's song "The One and Only", which reached number 10 on the Billboard Hot 100 singles chart. It also includes Filip Kutev's "Polegnala e Todora", although his name is spelled Philip Kouter.

== Reception ==
=== Critical response ===
Rotten Tomatoes gives the film an approval rating of 67% based on 51 reviews, with an average rating of 6.1/10. The site's critical consensus reads: "Doc Hollywood isn't particularly graceful in its attempt to put a '90s spin on its Capraesque formula, but a light touch and a charming cast make its flaws easy to forgive." On Metacritic it has a weighted average score of 56 out of 100 based on 20 critics, indicating "mixed or average" reviews. Audiences polled by CinemaScore gave the film an average grade of "B+" on an A+ to F scale.

Janet Maslin of The New York Times wrote that "Mr. Fox, blithe and funny as ever, amusingly shrugs off each new surprise the film has to offer", adding that "while retaining his boyish appeal, Mr. Fox also seems a shade more substantial this time, possibly because he is seen making life-or-death decisions when not fielding comic lines". She did, however, say that "the screenplay, by Jeffrey Price, Peter S. Seaman and Daniel Pyne, is occasionally sharp-tongued but more often pleasantly knee-deep in rustic corn".

Peter Rainer of the Los Angeles Times remarked that "[I]f you have any doubt as to the outcome, you haven't been paying attention to the latest self-serving movie trend. The back-to-basics, anti-greed message of Doc Hollywood has been all over the screens this season, from TV's Northern Exposure to the movies' City Slickers, Regarding Henry, Life Stinks and The Doctor". He added:

Doc Hollywood draws its energy almost exclusively from cliché. Caton-Jones, perhaps because he's Scottish, feels free to indulge himself with every piece of small-town, movie-derived Americana he can train his camera on; he's an equal-opportunity borrower. Even Local Hero, directed by fellow Scotsman Bill Forsyth, gets pillaged.

The cornball rowdiness is partially redeemed by the good cast, which includes Woody Harrelson as a lunky insurance salesman, David Ogden Stiers as the mayor, Roberts Blossom as a judge, Barnard Hughes as the town's decrepit doctor and Frances Sternhagen as a local busybody. Bridget Fonda turns up as a Hollywood-struck belle and, as usual, she's much stronger than her role allows for. Fonda has the power and the sass to become a major actress. Why did she bother with this dinky cameo?

Michael J. Fox, as in The Secret of My Success and the Back to the Future films, goes in for a lot of scampering here. In between scampering, he mugs. It's probably just as well that Fox doesn't bring much gravity to the role; if he were any moonier and heartfelt, the film might really be exposed as a crock.

Roger Ebert rated the film a three out of four stars stating "On the basis of the movie's trailer, I was expecting Doc Hollywood to be a comedy. And it is a comedy. But it surprised me by also being a love story, and a pretty good one – the kind where the lovers are smart enough to know all the reasons why they shouldn't get together, but too much in love to care."

Filmink called Hamilton's cameo "hilarious".

=== Box office ===
Doc Hollywood debuted at number three in the U.S. box office.

== Comparisons to Cars ==
The plot of the 2006 Disney/Pixar film Cars shares many similarities with Doc Hollywood. Both films tell the story of an arrogant young individual (in the case of the later film, an anthropomorphized race car) learning to appreciate the values of a small town while performing community service there to make up for damage he caused. The similarities did not go unnoticed by reviewers, one of whom claimed that Cars "rips off Doc Hollywood, almost note for note."
