= Roderick Matheson =

Canadian politician

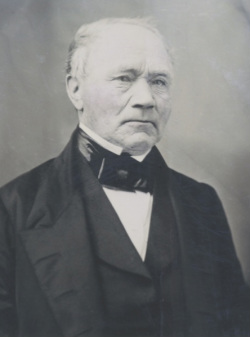
Portrait of the Honorable Roderick Matheson, prominent merchant and statesman.

The Honourable Roderick Matheson (December 1793 – January 13, 1873) was an Ontario businessman and political figure. He was a Conservative member of the Senate of Canada from 1867 until his death.

== Early life ==
He was born in Lochcarron, Ross-shire, Scotland in 1793 and came to Lower Canada around 1806. He served with the Glengarry Light Infantry Fencibles during the War of 1812, reaching the rank of lieutenant. In 1817, he settled at the military settlement at Perth. Matheson operated a general store there and was a director of the Tay Navigation Company. In 1847, he was appointed to the Legislative Council of the Province of Canada and, in 1855, he was made colonel and put in charge of the 1st military district of Canada West. He was named a Senator after Confederation.

== Private life ==
Matheson married Mary Fraser Robertson in Montreal on November 5, 1823. After she died giving birth to twin boys, John and Roderick, in 1825, he married Annabella Russell in Gairloch, Scotland on August 11, 1830. Matheson had seven daughters (Isabella, Flora, Mary, Anna, Eliza, Joan, and Rose) and four sons (William, Charles, Arthur and Alan), one of whom, Arthur, later served as treasurer of Ontario. Of his seven daughters, only one married. The rest lived out their days at the Matheson House in Perth, Upper Canada (Ontario) and helped tend to the house and gardens after their mother died in 1854.

== Death ==
Roderick Matheson died of a stroke in Perth, Ontario in 1873. Matheson House, his former residence in Perth, is a National Historic Site of Canada and now serves as the Perth Museum.
