= International Society on Hypertension in Blacks =

Non-profit medical society

- Abbreviation: ISHIB
- Formation: 1986
- Founder: Dallas Hall, Neil B. Shulman, and Elijah Saunders
- Founded at: Atlanta, Georgia, United States
- Purpose: To improve the health of racial and ethnic minorities
- Headquarters: Arlington, Virginia, United States
- President: Brent M. Egan
- Vice President: Kwame Osei
- Secretary-Treasurer: Angela L. Brown
- Website: www.ahajournals.org/doi/10.1161/hypertensionaha.110.152892

The International Society on Hypertension in Blacks (abbreviated ISHIB) is a non-profit medical society based in Atlanta, United States which is dedicated to improving the health of racial and ethnic minority groups worldwide. It was founded in 1986 by the physicians Dallas Hall, Neil B. Shulman, and Elijah Saunders, in response to concern about high rates of hypertension among African Americans. By 2006, the society had broadened its scope to focus not just on reducing rates of hypertension among African Americans, but also on improving the health of all minority populations around the world. The society's official peer-reviewed journal is Ethnicity & Disease, which it has published since 1991.
