= Church of the Mediator (Micanopy, Florida) =

Historic church in Florida, United States

- Episcopal Church of the Mediator; Micanopy, Florida
- U.S. Historic district – Contributing property
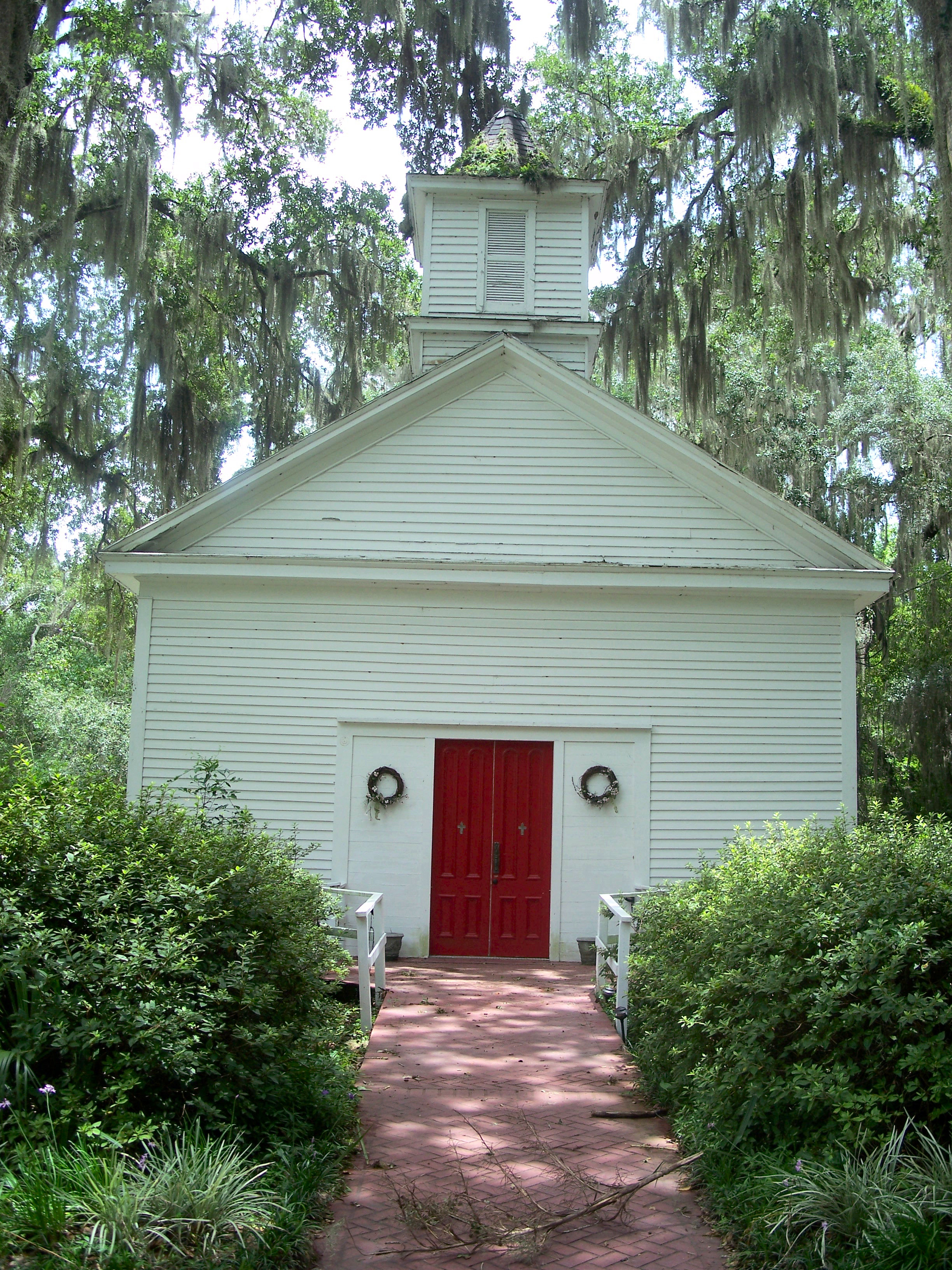
- Church of the Mediator front
- Location: 501 N.E. Cholokka Boulevard; Micanopy, Florida
- Coordinates: 29°30′25″N 82°16′46″W
- Built: 1874

The Church of the Mediator is a historic church in Micanopy, Florida which was built in 1874 as a Presbyterian church but since 1966 has been an Episcopal church. It is a contributing property in the Micanopy Historic District.

== History ==
The church was built in 1874 to serve a Presbyterian congregation that dated back to 1854. Presbyterian services continued in the church until the 1960s. In 1966, the property was acquired for an Episcopal mission which started services in the building on October 16, 1966. The name Church of the Mediator was chosen for the new mission to remember the Episcopal church of that name that existed in Micanopy from 1857 to the 1910s, and whose building at another location in Micanopy was torn down in the 1920s.

== Current use ==
The Church of the Mediator is still active in the Episcopal Diocese of Florida. Its current vicar is the Rev. George Holston.

== See also ==
- Micanopy Historic District
