= Micanopy Historic District =

Historic district in Florida, United States

- U.S. National Register of Historic Places
- U.S. Historic district
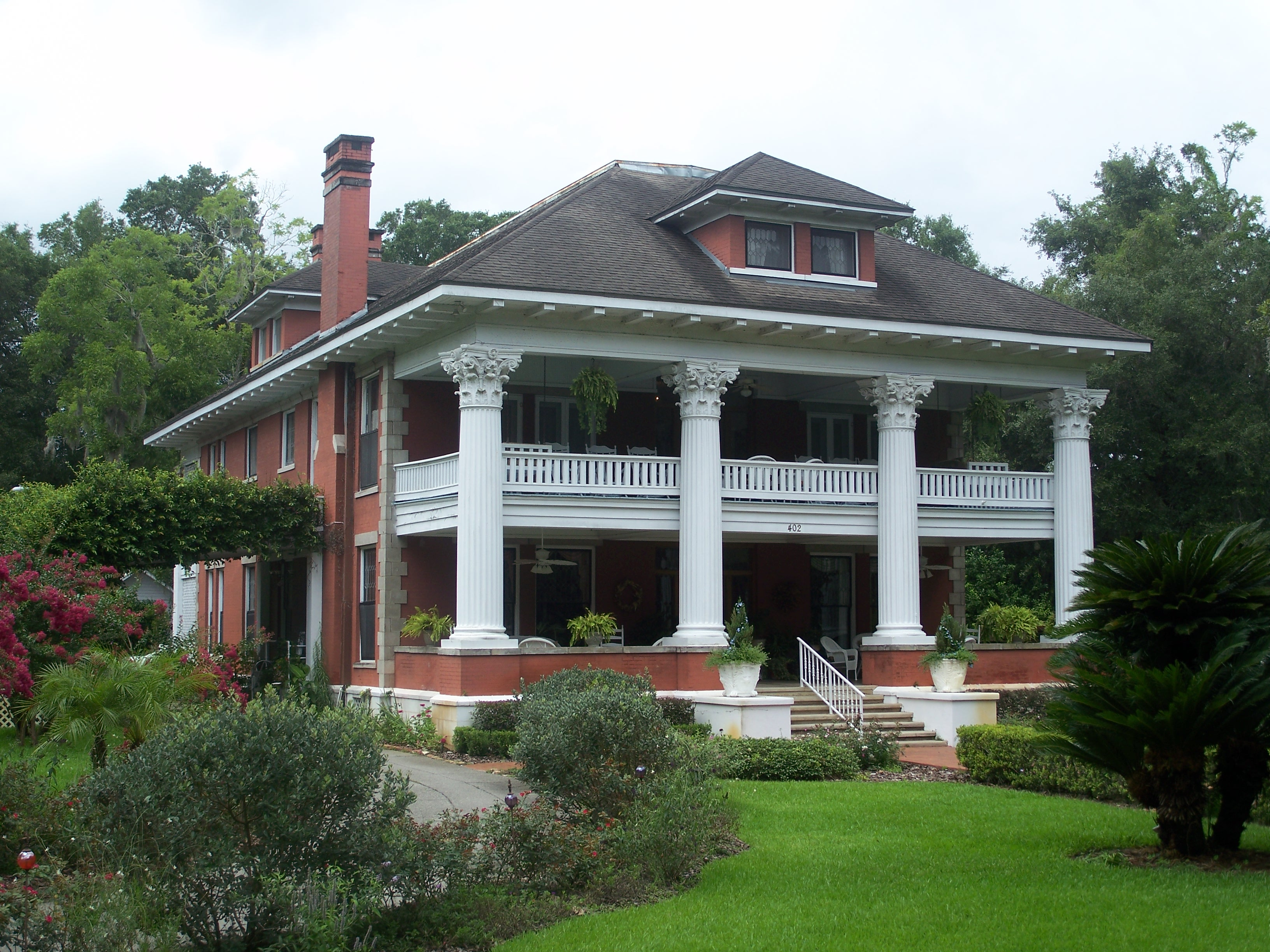
- Herlong Mansion in the Micanopy Historic District

- Location within Florida Location within the United States
- Location: Micanopy, Florida
- Coordinates: 29°30′21″N 82°16′58″W
- Area: 470 acres (1.9 km^{2})
- Built: 1776
- NRHP reference No.: 83003512
- Added to NRHP: January 28, 1983

The Micanopy Historic District is a U.S. historic district (designated as such on January 28, 1983) located in Micanopy, Florida. It encompasses approximately 470 acres (1.9 km^{2}), roughly bounded by Cholokka Boulevard from US 441 to Ocala Street and Smith Street West to Okehumkee Street. It contains 35 historic buildings.

== Gallery ==
=== Churches ===
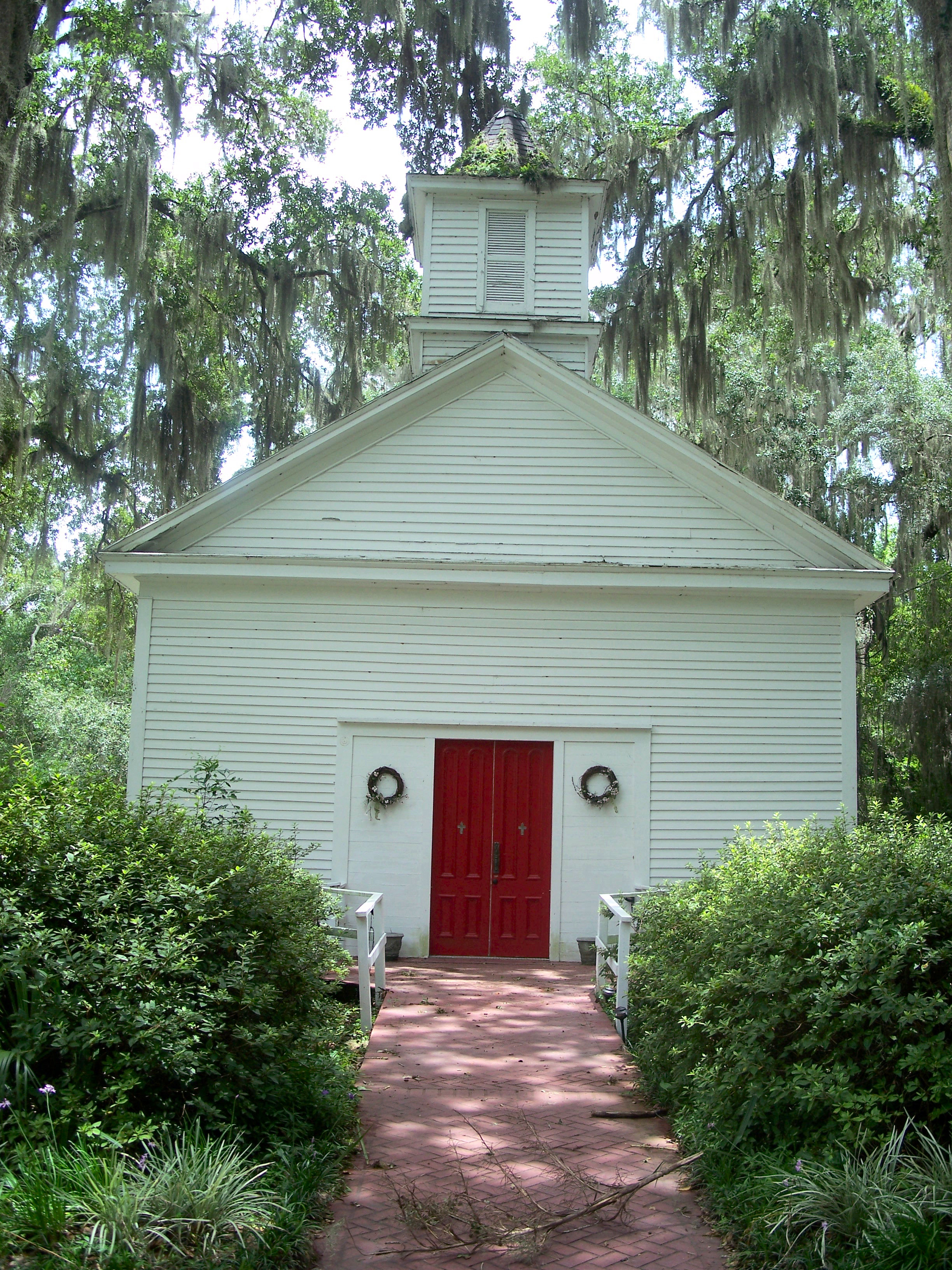
Presbyterian Church, now Episcopal Church of the Mediator.

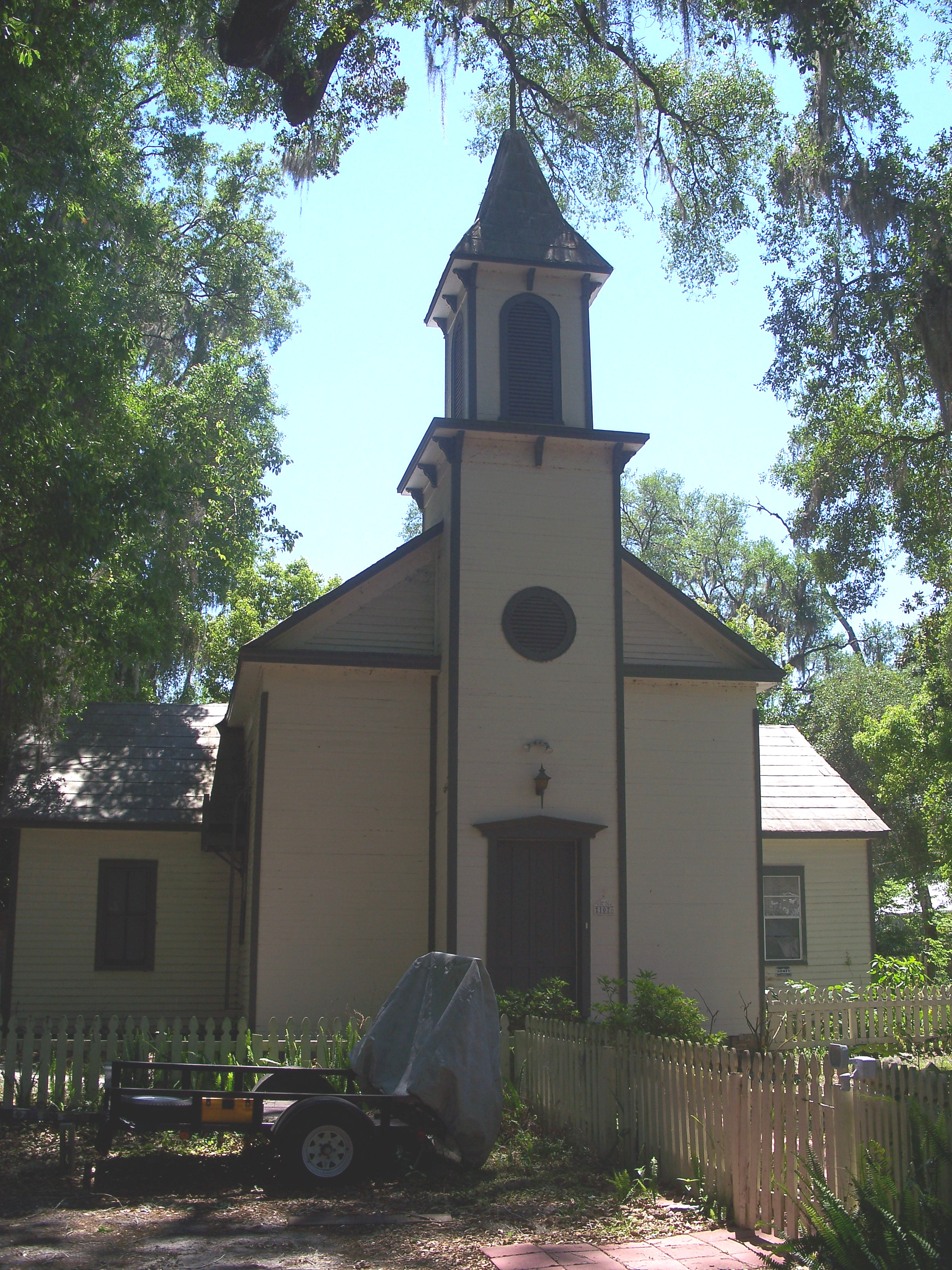
Old Baptist Church, now a private house.

=== Houses ===
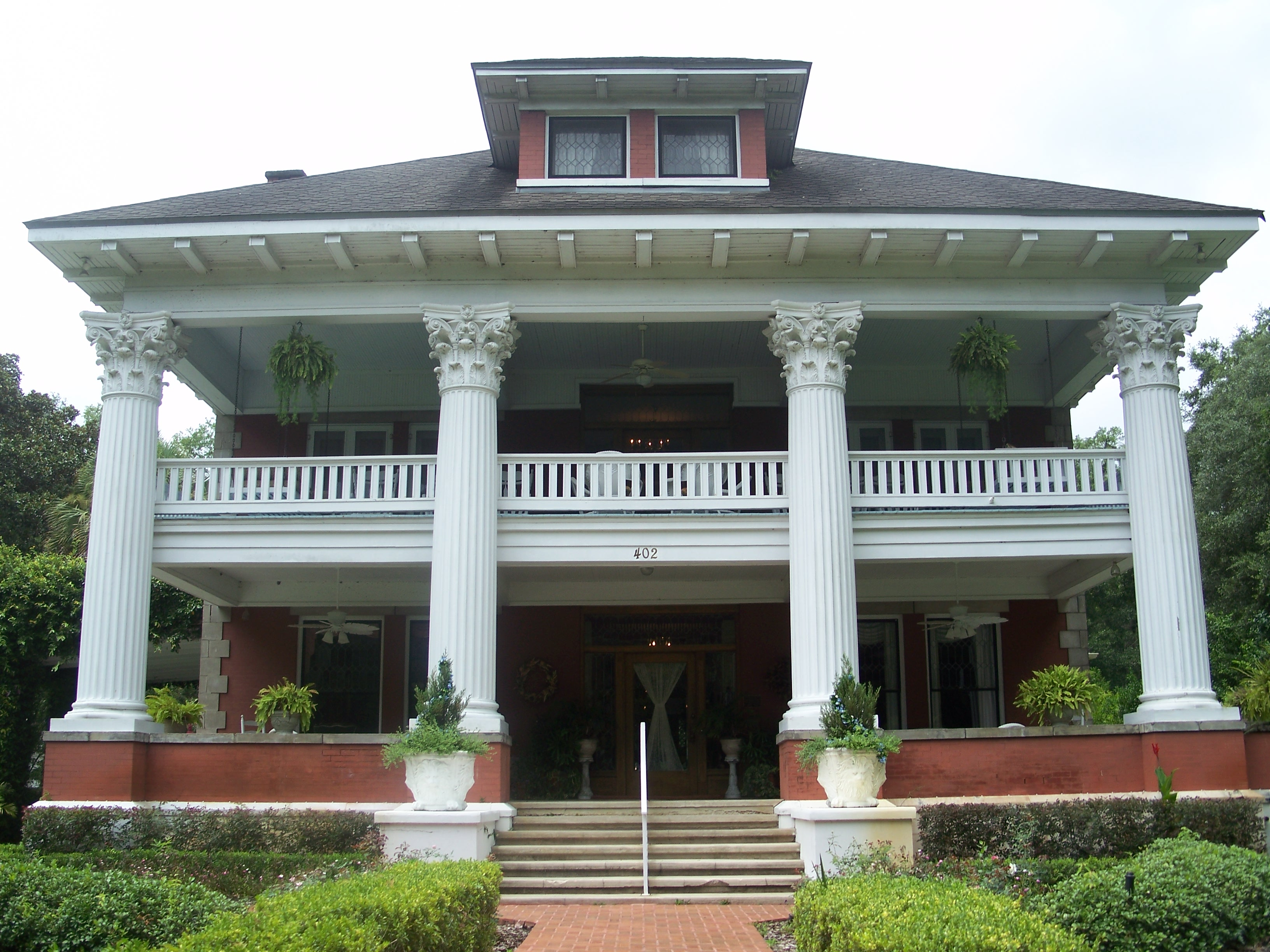
Herlong House, now a bed and breakfast

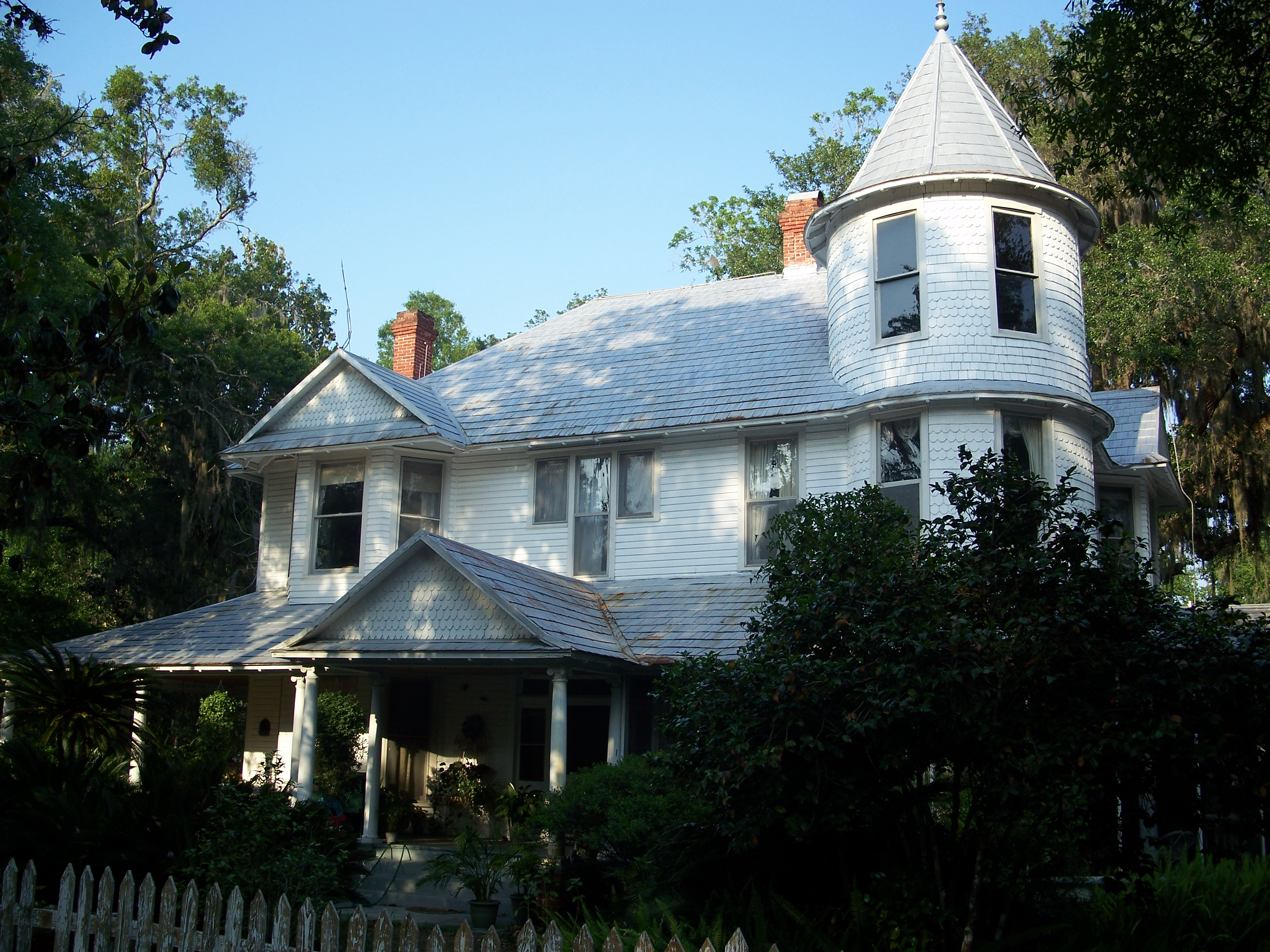
Simonton House

== See also ==
- Church of the Mediator (Micanopy, Florida)
