= Augustus Steele =

American politician

- Born: June 4, 1792; Connecticut
- Died: October 26, 1864 (aged 72); Wellborn, Florida
- Burial place: Evergreen Cemetery (Gainesville, Florida)
- Occupations: Judge; Politician; State Legislator; Postmaster; Port Inspector; Tax Collector
- Known for: Pioneering Florida
- Term: Florida State Legislature, 1850–1852
- Opponent: Thomas Brown
- Spouse: Elizabeth Coddingham

Augustus Steele (June 4, 1792 – October 25, 1864) was a Florida entrepreneur, a Florida state legislator, and helped found Hillsborough County.

== Early life ==
Steele was born June 4, 1792, somewhere in Connecticut.

== Career ==
=== Time in Northern Florida ===
Steele came to Florida in 1825 and was originally a settler in Northern Florida. He helped found the town of Magnolia but it was soon eclipsed by St. Marks. In Magnolia, Steele would be the editor and publisher of The Magnolia Advertiser which was founded in 1828. The paper would cease publishing in 1830. It was the first paper published in Magnolia and the seventh made in what is presently Florida.

=== Tampa ===
Steele left Magnolia for Tampa in 1830 for unclear reasons. When he arrived in Tampa he would establish a newspaper named The Gouger. He would lead efforts in order to create Hillsborough County which was created in 1834. While there he built his home at Fort Brooke in 1830 along the Hillsborough River being permitted to do so as he served as the customs officer there. He would start subdividing lots in Tampa starting in 1838. Also in 1838 the federal government became concerned about land being illegally subdivided within the Fort Brooke military reservation which this subdivision was. However taking action against this was described as being "impossible" as federal law gave United States Marshalls the power to remove these residents who lived on subdivided land. Marshall Joseph Sanchez was instructed twice to remove them but his deputy refused to do so unless the county judge let them so and in this case the judge was Steele. Steele received so many complaints about his conduct serving as a postmaster and revenue collector that the Secretary of War in 1839 recommended removing him.

=== Cedar Keys ===
Steele would apply for 169 acres (0.68 km^{2}) of land in 1843 under the Armed Occupation Act of 1842 that made up Depot Key which he renamed Atsena Otie Key. The meaning and origin of the name Atsena Otie is unknown. Most of the island was destroyed in a recent hurricane and he planned to use the island as a port and resort community building summer cottages there for affluent clientele.

=== Politics ===
Augustus ran for the Florida State Legislature in 1850 and 1852. This allowed him to lobby for a cross-state railroad. The railroad was one of the first in Florida and Steele desired its route to go to Cedar Key which was one of Florida's main ports. In 1852 he joined with David Yulee going against Governor Thomas Brown's idea of it going to St. Marks.

In 1860, local voters decided to send Augustus Steele as a representative of Levy County to the Florida Secession Committee which was trying to secede from the United States and become part of The Confederacy.

=== Death ===
Steele left Cedar Key after Union soldiers arrived and went to Wellborn, Florida where he died at on October 26, 1864.

== Personal life ==
He was an acquaintance of Alonzo B. Noyes who served as a customs collector and the Superintendent of Lights at St. Mark's Florida and during the American Civil War was a major in the Confederate Army.

Steele married an Irish-born Roman Catholic woman named Elizabeth Coddingham in 1846. The two had one child, Augusta "Gussie" Florida Steele who was born on Atsena Otie Key in 1847. Her daughter would be tutored by James Ryder Randall, a man named Lignoski along with Ryder Randall. She married James Douglas Matheson and moved to Gainesville with him in 1867 residing at the Matheson House. Her husband moved to Gainesville from Camden, South Carolina and after fighting in the American Civil War for the Confederacy under Robert E. Lee where he surrendered at Appomattox Courthouse. James served as an Alachua County commissioner, the county treasurer, on the board of East Florida Seminary and as an elder at the First Presbyterian Church in Gainesville. James died in 1911 while Augusta died in 1916 being buried at Evergreen Cemetery. They had four children: Bessie, Catherine, Steele and Chris. Only one of them, Chris survived to adulthood as Steele died in a hunting accident just before his 16th birthday, while . Chris would go onto become a lawyer where he pushed to make Gainesville be the site of the University of Florida and served as Gainesville's mayor from 1910 to 1917. In 1917 he was elected as a member of the Florida House of Representatives but left after completing a single term as he decided to become a minister moving to Oklahoma where he married a woman at but did not have any children with her.
