= Neil B. Shulman =

American doctor and medical writer (1945–2023)

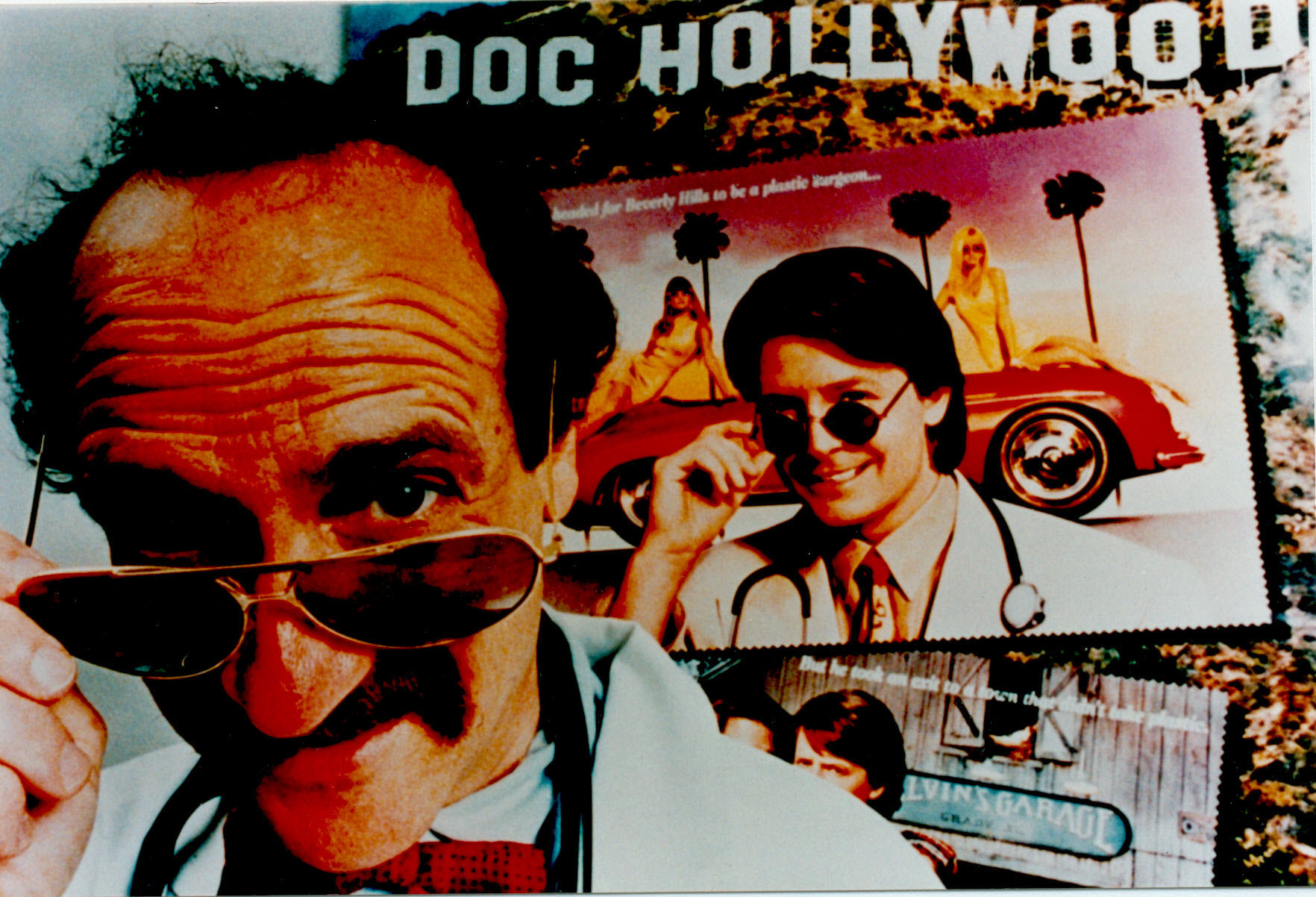
Neil B. Shulman posing in front of a Doc Hollywood poster.

Neil Barnett Shulman (March 18, 1945 – November 6, 2023) was an American doctor and medical writer who was an associate professor in the School of Medicine at Emory University. He conducted and published clinical research on hypertension and was the co-founder of the International Society on Hypertension in Blacks. He was also the author of many books promoting medical literacy for both adults and children, as well as humor and children's books. He was the associate producer of the 1991 film Doc Hollywood, based on one of his books.

== Medical career ==
Shulman graduated from Emory University School of Medicine in 1971, after which he began teaching at the same institution. He has conducted research and published a variety of papers on the field of hypertension, funded at the level of around $8 million by the National Institutes of Health.

In 1986 Shulman co-founded the International Society of Hypertension in Blacks (ISHIB) together with Wilbur Dallas Hall and Elijah Sanders. Through its annual research conference, this society brings the latest approaches to cardiovascular disease prevention and treatment to health care professionals in the West and the Third World. Shulman also helped launch ISHIB's peer-reviewed quarterly journal, Ethnicity & Disease, and the Heart to Heart Program which brought children from developing countries to the United States for life-saving heart surgery.

Shulman was chairman of the board of Patch Adams’ Gesundheit! Institute, and an advisory board member of Global H.E.E.D., a non-profit organization founded by former students of Emory University, Zain Ahmed '08C and Sonny Bandyopadhyay '07C to promote development, medicine, and public health in Guatemala.

== Healthcare activist ==
Shulman was a patient advocate who took an active role on behalf of healthcare consumers and patients with limited access to care. Shulman founded the Medical Volunteerism Conference in 2010 which met at Emory University with over 2,000 international attendants in that year. In 2011 the summit was held again, this time called the Global Health and Humanitarian Summit. He played an active role on behalf of patients affected by the closing of the dialysis clinic at Grady Memorial Hospital in Atlanta, GA, which ultimately led to a favourable outcome for the affected patients. He was a key contributor to the 2013 Global Health and Humanitarian Summit. held at Emory University between April 12 and April 14, 2013.

== Author, filmmaker, website developer ==
Shulman authored and co-authored many books on medical topics, as well as consumer medical primers for adults and children, and children's books. He self-published children's and humour books through his own company, Rx Humor.

In 1991 his book What? Dead…Again? was made into a feature film called Doc Hollywood, starring Michael J. Fox; Shulman was an associate producer on the film. He also produced, co-directed, co-wrote and co-starred in the independent feature film Who Nose? (Wet Sock Productions, 2006).

In 1999 he developed his book Your Body’s Red Light Warning Signals: Medical tips that may save your life into an interactive consumer website (www.redlightwarningsignals.com). In 2007 he developed his children's book What’s in a Doctor’s Bag? into an interactive website (www.whatsinadoctorsbag.com).

Shulman was also a comic performer on the subjects of humour and medical literacy. He often performed in fundraisers for free clinics and other charitable ventures.

== Personal life and death ==
Shulman married actress Zoe Haugo in October 2008. They had one son, born September 2006.

Shulman died on November 6, 2023, at the age of 78.

== Selected bibliography ==
=== Books ===
- Hall, Wilbur Dallas (1985). Hypertension in Blacks: Epidemiology, pathophysiology and treatment. ISBN 0-8151-4095-9. (with W. Dallas Hall and Elijah Saunders)
- Three Medical Experts Tell You What You Want to Know About High Blood Pressure. (with Elijah Sanders and W. Dallas Hall)
- What? Dead…Again?. Rx Humor. 1979. ISBN 0-9639002-2-6.
- Understanding Growth Hormone: New Discoveries to Help Very Short Children...Are They Also a Fountain of Youth?. Hippocrene Books. January 1993. ISBN 0-7818-0071-4. (with Letitia Sweitzer)
- Finally: I'm a Doctor. Rx Humor. May 1993. ISBN 0-938289-32-2.
- Better Health Care for Less. Hippocrene Books. July 1993. ISBN 0-7818-0122-2. (with Letitia Sweitzer)
- High Blood Pressure: A Handbook for Survival. Dell Publishing. September 1993. ISBN 5-556-00514-1.
- The Backyard Tribe. St. Martin's Press. March 1994. ISBN 0-312-10513-4.
- What's in a Doctor's Bag?. Rx Humor. October 1994. ISBN 0-9639002-3-4. (with Sibley Fleming)
- Under the Backyard Sky. Rx Humor. May 1995. ISBN 1-56145-093-6. (with Sibley Fleming)
- Let's Play Doctor: Unlocking the Mysteries of the Physical Exam. Rx Humor. 1995. ISBN 0-945019-61-0. (with Edmond Moses and Daniel Adame)
- Second Wind. Rx Humor. August 1995. ISBN 0-9639002-6-9. (with P. K. Beville)
- The Germ Patrol: A book for all ages about shots for tots…and big kids, too!. Rx Humor. April 1998. ISBN 0-9639002-8-5. (with Todd Stolp and Robin Voss)
- 101 Ways to Know If You're a Nurse. Rx Humor. 1998. ISBN 1-892157-00-4. (with Kristin Anlage)
- Your Body's Red Light Warning Signs: Medical Tips That May Save Your Life. Dell Publishing. April 1999. ISBN 0-440-23461-1.
- The Black Man's Guide to Good Health: Essential Advice for the Special Concerns of African-American Men. Hilton Pub. 2001. (with James W. Reed and Charlene Shucker)
- Healthy Transitions: A Woman's Guide to Perimenopause, Menopause, & Beyond. Prometheus Books. February 2004. ISBN 1-59102-150-2. (with Edmund S. Kim)
- Your Body, Your Health: How to Ask Questions, Find Answers, and Work With Your Doctor. Prometheus Books. September 2002. ISBN 1-59102-012-3. (with Rowena Sobczyk)
- Spotless. Rx Humor. 2004.
- The Great Face Off. Rx Humor. 2005. (with Allison Anderson)
- The Real Origins of Doc Hollywood. AuthorHouse. May 2007. ISBN 978-1-4259-8860-9.
- Get Between the Covers: Leave a Legacy by Writing a Book. Morgan James Publishing. 2008. ISBN 978-1-60037-315-2. (with Eric Spencer)
- The Real Truth About Aging: A Survival Guide for Older Adults and Caregivers. Prometheus Books. June 2009. ISBN 978-1-59102-719-5. (with Michael Silverman and Adam G. Golden)

=== Articles ===
- Shulman, Neil; Cutter, Gary; Daugherty, Robert; Sexton, Mary; Pauk, George; Taylor, Mary Jordan; Tyler, Myra (March 1982). "Correlates of attendance and compliance in the hypertension detection and follow-up program". Controlled Clinical Trials. 3 (1): 13–27. doi:10.1016/0197-2456(82)90016-2. PMID 7067470. (with Gary Cutter, Robert Daugherty, Mary Sexton, George Pauk, Mary Jordan Taylor and Myra Tyler)
- Shulman, N. B.; Martinez, B.; Brogan, D.; Carr, A. A.; Miles, C. G. (1986). "Financial Cost as an Obstacle to Hypertension Therapy". American Journal of Public Health. 76 (9): 1105–1108. doi:10.2105/AJPH.76.9.1105. PMC 1646559. PMID 3740334. (with B. Martinez, D. Brogan, A. A. Carr, and C. G. Miles)
- Davis, B. R.; Langford, H. G.; Blaufox, M. D.; Curb, J. D.; Polk, B. F.; Shulman, N. B. (1987). "The association of postural changes in systolic blood pressure and mortality in persons with hypertension: The Hypertension Detection and Follow-up Program experience". Circulation. 75 (2). American Heart Association: 340–346. doi:10.1161/01.cir.75.2.340. PMID 3802437. (with Barry R. Davis, Herbert G. Langford, M. Donald Blaufox, J. David Curb, and B. Frank Polk)
- Shulman, N. B. (1988). "Treatment of hypertension in black patients with angiotensin-converting enzyme inhibitors". Journal of the National Medical Association. 80 (3): 265–272. PMC 2625639. PMID 3280812.
- Klag, Michael J.; Whelton, Paul K.; Randall, Bryan L.; Neaton, James D.; Brancati, Frederick L.; Ford, Charles E.; Shulman, Neil B.; Stamler, Jeremiah (4 January 1996). "Blood Pressure and End-Stage Renal Disease in Men". New England Journal of Medicine. 334 (1): 13–18. doi:10.1056/nejm199601043340103. PMID 7494564. (with Michael J. Klag, Paul K. Whelton, Bryan L. Randall, James D. Neaton, Frederick L. Brancati, Charles E. Ford, and Jeremiah Stamler)

=== Book chapters ===
- "Medical Regimen Adherence and Appointment Compliance" in Hypertension management: Clinical practice and therapeutic dilemmas, Gary L. Wolman and Wilbur Dallas Hall, eds. 1988: Year Book Medical Publishers, pp. 398–405. ISBN 0-8151-4075-4.
