= Matheson House (Gainesville, Florida) =

Historic house in Florida, United States

- U.S. National Register of Historic Places

- Location within Florida Location within the United States
- Interactive map showing the location of Matheson House
- Location: Gainesville, Florida
- Coordinates: 29°39′3″N 82°19′13″W
- Architectural style: Frame Vernacular with Greek Revival elements
- NRHP reference No.: 73000564
- Added to NRHP: June 4, 1973

The 1867 Matheson House is a historic building in Gainesville, Florida, United States. It is located at 528 Southeast 1st Avenue. It was the home of James Douglas Matheson and Augusta Florida Steele Matheson, the daughter of Florida pioneer Augustus Steele, who founded Hillsborough County and Cedar Key. James Douglas Matheson owned a dry goods store in downtown Gainesville and was active in local and state politics, as was his son, eight-term Gainesville mayor Chris Matheson, who was also a state legislator.

Chris's widow, Sarah Matheson, deeded the house to the Alachua County Historical Society, which later merged with the Matheson History Museum after it opened in 1994. Sarah Matheson lived in the house until her death in 1996. She was the first female elder at First Presbyterian Church in downtown Gainesville and was an early president of the Alachua County Historical Society and a co-founder and member of the original board of directors of the Matheson Histical Center (now the Matheson History Museum). The 1867 Matheson House is now part of the Matheson History Museum Complex, which recounts the history of Alachua County. On June 4, 1973, it was added to the U.S. National Register of Historic Places. The house is open by appointment only.

== History ==
The Matheson house was constructed in 1857 by the Matheson family from Camden, South Carolina. While it was unoccupied during the civil war, James Douglas Matheson moved into it 1867 with his wife, Augusta Florida Steele. Their son, Christopher Matheson, later inherited the house. Christopher's widow, Sarah Hamilton Matheson, would eventually deed the house to the Matheson Museum shortly before her death in 1996.

== Architecture ==
The House combines South Carolina plantation architecture on the first floor with Classic Revival raised cottage architecture on the later added second floor. The roof and interior stairway have gothic design elements, and the house possesses a gambrel roof uncommon to Florida.

== Gallery ==
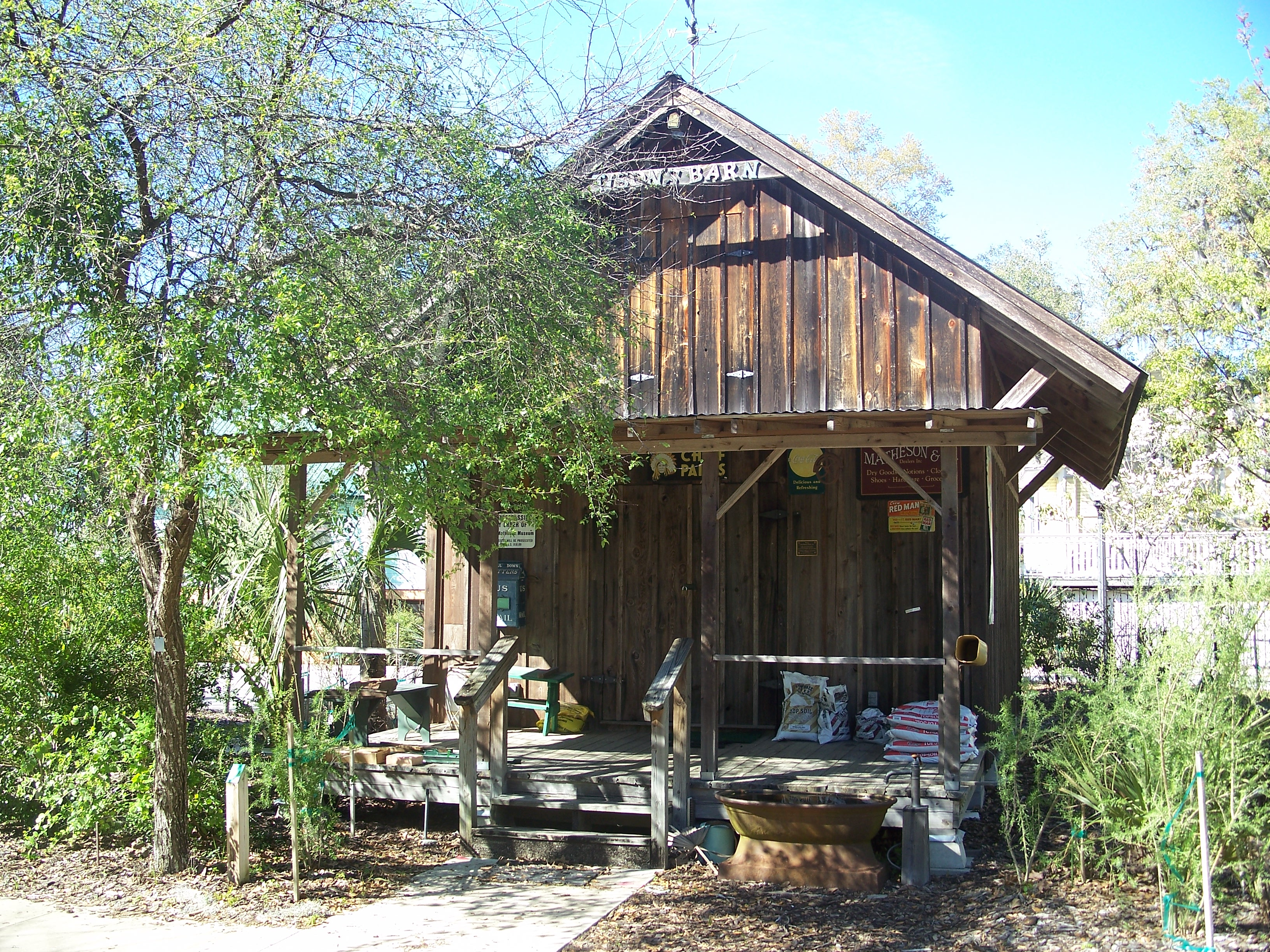
The Tison Tool Museum, located behind the historic Matheson House.
