= Matheson House (Perth) =

Historic house in Perth, Ontario

Coordinates: 44°54′3.92″N 76°15′2.39″W

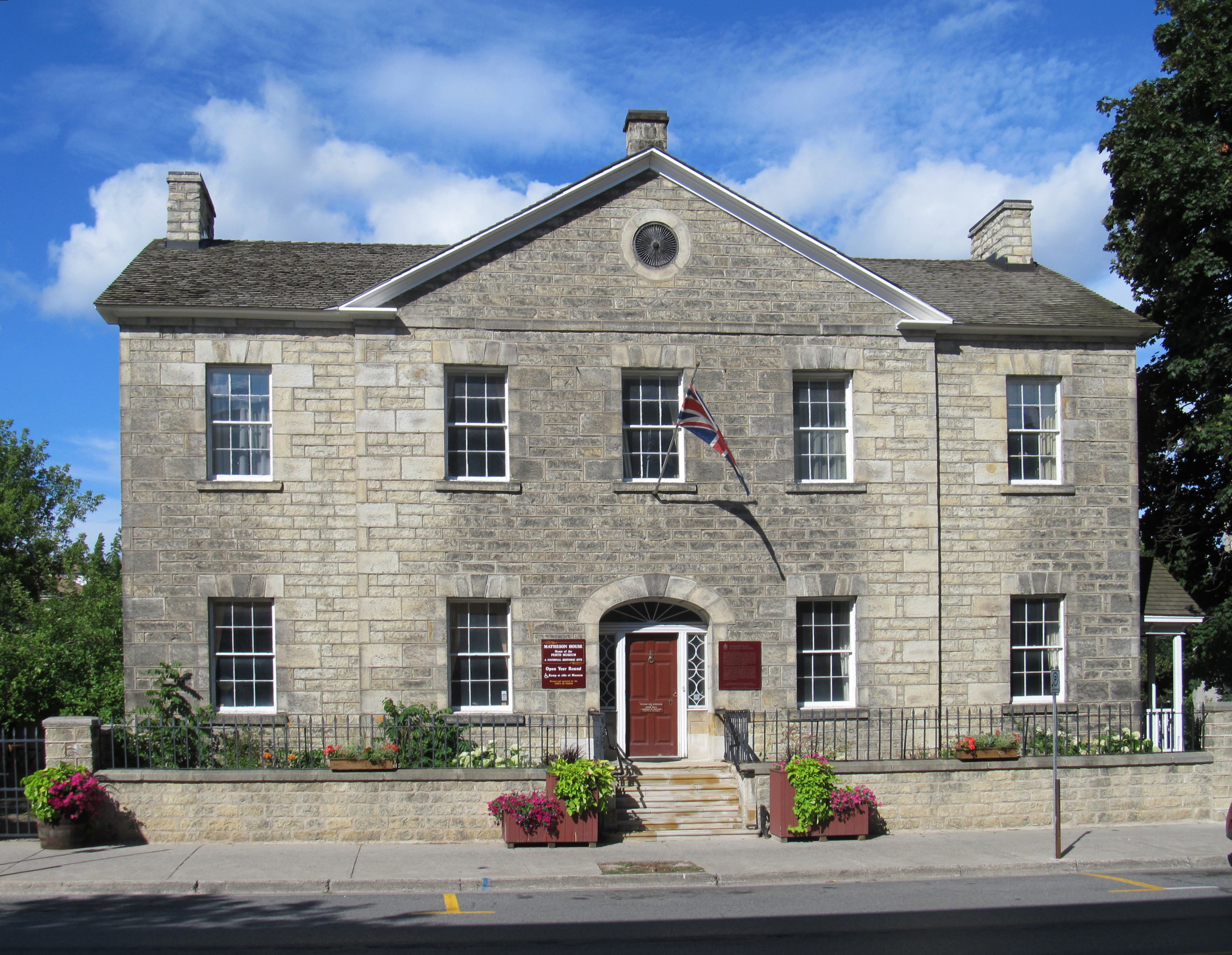
- Location: Ontario, Canada
- Nearest city: Perth
- Built: 1840
- Original use: House
- Current use: Perth Museum
- Governing body: Town of Perth
- Website: http://www.town.perth.on.ca/siteengine/activepage.asp?pageid=97

National Historic Site of Canada
- Designated: 1966

Matheson House is a historic house in Perth, Ontario, Canada. It was constructed in 1840 for Roderick Matheson, a local merchant and later a member of the Senate of Canada.

A two-storey, five-bay sandstone house of Palladian-inspired design, Matheson House is surrounded by a stone garden wall. After Roderick Matheson's death in 1873, the house was inherited by Arthur James Matheson, a lawyer and member of the Legislative Assembly of Ontario. After a series of subsequent owners, the house was acquired by the municipality and became the Perth Museum.

The house was designated a National Historic Site of Canada in 1966.
