= Elizabeth Sparhawk-Jones =

American painter (1885–1968)

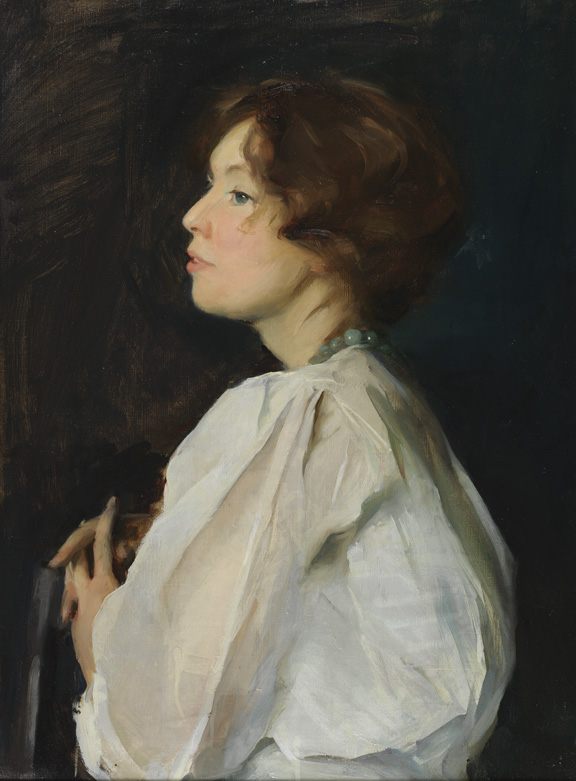
- 1910 portrait by Alice Kent Stoddard
- Born: Elizabeth Huntington Jones; November 8, 1885
- Died: December 26, 1968 (aged 83); Connecticut, U.S.
- Resting place: Immanuel Episcopal Church cemetery, Sparks, Maryland, U.S. 39.55338°N 76.62659°W
- Education: Pennsylvania Academy of the Fine Arts; Academie de la Grande Chaumiere; Darby School of Painting
- Notable work: The Porch (1907); Shoe Shop (1911); Shop Girls (1912); The Dreamer (c. 1942)
- Awards: Mary Smith Prize, Pennsylvania Academy of the Fine Arts 1908; Mary Smith Prize, Pennsylvania Academy of the Fine Arts 1912 In the Spring; Marine award, Silvermine Guild of Artists 1964 A seascape painting

Elizabeth Sparhawk-Jones (born Elizabeth Huntington Jones; November 8, 1885 – December 26, 1968) was an American painter who lived in New York City, Philadelphia, and Paris, France. She had a successful career as a painter at the turn of the century, exhibiting her works internationally and winning awards. She had a mental breakdown that caused a break in her career, and she returned to have a successful second career, creating modern watercolor paintings. She was a resident at three artist colonies, with notable artists, writers, and musicians. Sparhawk-Jones' works are in American art museums, including the Art Institute of Chicago, Metropolitan Museum of Art, and Museum of Modern Art.

== Personal life ==
=== Family ===
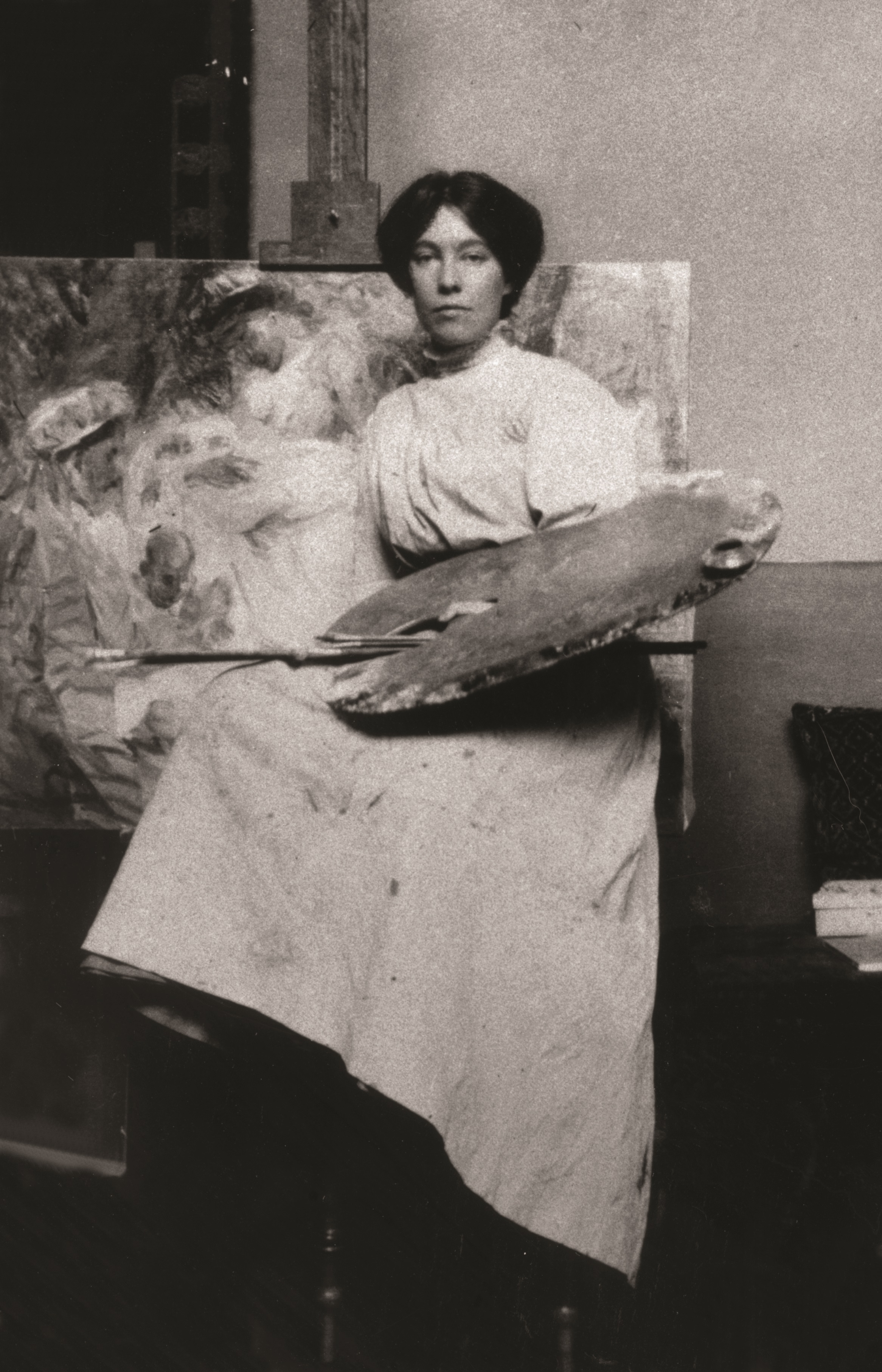
Sparhawk-Jones in her studio c. 1905

Elizabeth Huntington Jones was born on November 8, 1885, the daughter of Rev. John Sparhawk Jones, D.D. and Harriet Sterett Winchester, who grew up in Northern Baltimore County on the Clynmalira estate. (Note: Harriet Winchester Jones, the daughter of Alexander Winchester, wrote about the history and her life at the estate in the article A Childhood at Clynmalira. Her maternal grandfather was Henry Hill Carroll, of the Maryland Carroll family.) John Sparhawk Jones was a clergyman at the Brown Memorial Presbyterian Church in Baltimore's Bolton Hill (Note: John Sparhawk Jones was the son of Judge Joel Jones, who was a mayor of Philadelphia, and Miss Sparhawk.) until 1890. The Sparhawk-Joneses moved to Philadelphia after John suffered a deep depression and he became the pastor of the Calvary Church in 1894. (Note: In 1906, Rev. John Sparhawk Jones' portrait was painted by William Merritt Chase.)

Her mother was a domineering woman who nonetheless believed in allowing children to follow their talents and interests. She introduced Elizabeth and her sister Margaret to classic literature. Both of her parents encouraged Elizabeth to pursue her interest in art, which began at about seven years of age. She won first place in a nationwide art contest as a child and left school at about 15 years of age to attend the Pennsylvania Academy of the Fine Arts (PAFA).

Elizabeth's first love was Morton Livingston Schamberg, who was a fellow artist and student at the Pennsylvania Academy of the Fine Arts. Her parents, though, did not approve of her relationship with Schamberg, likely because he was Jewish. In 1906, she was persuaded by her parents to turn down the coveted two-year traveling scholarship from PAFA, which would have had her in Paris at the same time as Schamberg. Their relationship then ended.

In 1907, Elizabeth changed her name to Elizabeth Sparhawk-Jones to honor her father's mother.

While the family of four was on vacation, Elizabeth's father died on August 20, 1910, in Vermont at Bread Loaf. (Note: The New York Observer stated that he died in Bradlow, Vermont.) That year, Margaret graduated from University of Pennsylvania with a Master's Degree. Margaret married Bayard Turnbull in Paris in October 1913 against her mother's wishes. Harriet pressed Elizabeth to side with her, which resulted in a strained relationship between the sisters for many years. Elizabeth became exhausted from her career efforts, the strain in the relationship with her sister Margaret, and family financial losses.

=== Mental breakdown ===
Sparhawk-Jones struggled with depression, like her father, and when she was not well she burned her paintings, which reduced the number of works available for sale. In 1913, Sparhawk-Jones had a mental breakdown and lived in the Pennsylvania Hospital for the Insane for three years. The experience was hard on her and she was forever changed. Sparhawk-Jones was terrified and lonely at the asylum, and may have been subject to opium or sedative drugs. She moved in with her mother after she was released from the hospital in 1916. Sparhawk-Jones dealt with the losses of her teacher William Merritt Chase, who died in 1916, and Morton Shamburg, who died in 1918. She said that she did not work as an artist for about 12 years.

=== Relationships ===
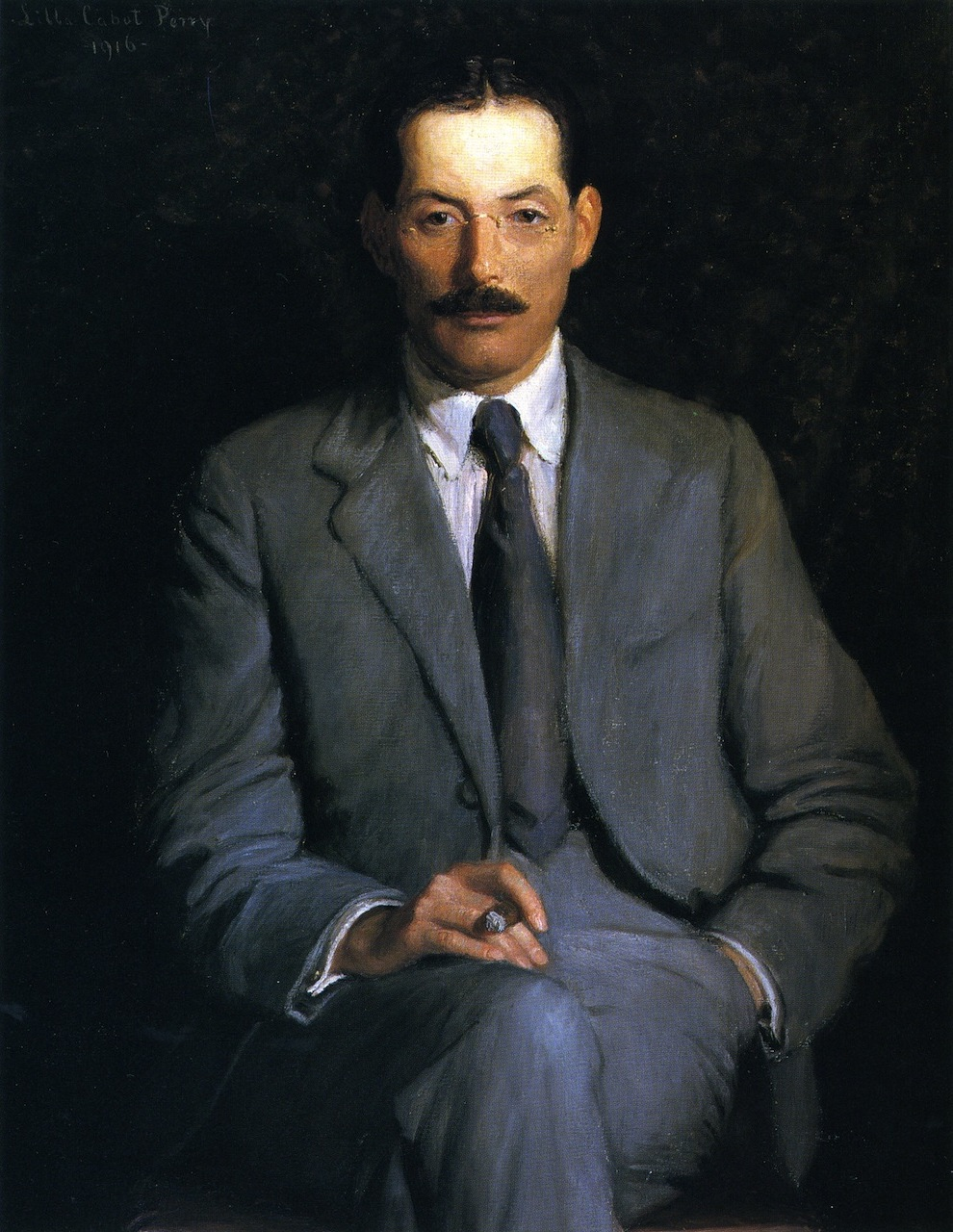
Lilla Cabot Perry, Edwin Arlington Robinson, 1916, Colby College Special Collections, Waterville, Maine

Sparhawk-Jones appreciated the company of writers over other artists, and enjoyed the periods when she lived at artist retreats, like MacDowell Colony and Yaddo, which had resident writers, musicians, and artists. Edwin Arlington Robinson (1868–1935), a Pulitzer Prize winning poet, and Sparhawk-Jones visited the MacDowell Colony at the same times over a cumulative total of ten years. They had a romantic relationship in which she was in love with him, devoted to him, understood him, and did not press for a more intimate relationship. He called her Sparhawk and was courteous towards her. They had a relationship that D. H. Tracy described as "courtly, quiet, and intense." When he died, Sparhawk-Jones attended his vigil and then painted several paintings in his memory. She described him as a charming, sensitive, and emotionally grounded man with high moral values.

Sparhawk-Jones was a friend of Nancy Cox-McCormack, with whom she corresponded between 1935 and 1956, Marsden Hartley, and Hudson Walker (of the Hudson Walker Gallery). Sparhawk-Jones was known for her humor and wit, but confided in a 1964 oral history interview that she always felt lonely, preferring a quiet lifestyle.

=== Residences ===
Sparhawk-Jones lived part of her adult life in and around Philadelphia, including the rural Westtown Township, Pennsylvania. She visited Paris often for up to six months at a time, returning to spend time with her family. (Note: Her sister Margaret, studied at Bryn Mawr, received her Master's in history from the University of Pennsylvania. She married and had a son, Andrew Turnbull, biographer of Scott Fitzgerald and Thomas Wolfe.) In the mid-1950s, she moved to Paris and lived there at least through the mid-1960s.

== Education ==
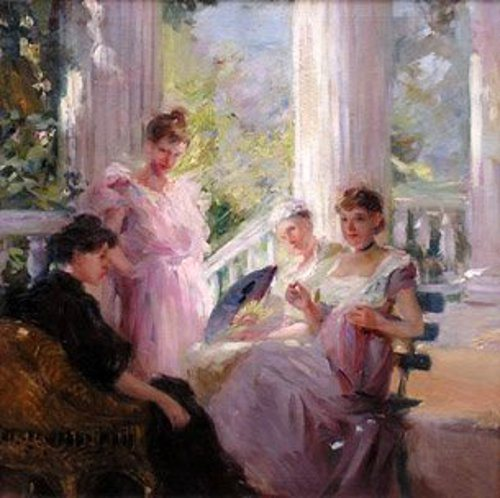
Elizabeth Sparhawk-Jones, The Porch, 1907

Sparhawk-Jones studied at the Pennsylvania Academy of the Fine Arts (PAFA). From about 1900, when she was 15 through about 1903, when Thomas Anshutz, Charles Sheeler, and Morton Livingston Schamberg were there. Anshutz taught sketch classes with plaster cast models and dressed models. She received letters of encouragement and critiques by William Merritt Chase, who taught a portrait and life class. During one of the summers at PAFA, she studied in Paris at the Academie de la Grande Chaumiere, where she found the life drawing classes freer than in the United States. In Paris, models included adolescents and pretty young women, and there was an openness and comfort with nudity. Sparhawk-Jones attended Darby School of Painting at Fort Washington, under Anshutz, who was co-founder of the summer school and taught there through 1910. She learned modern art through Schamberg, who was a romantic interest at PAFA.

== Career ==
=== Early career ===
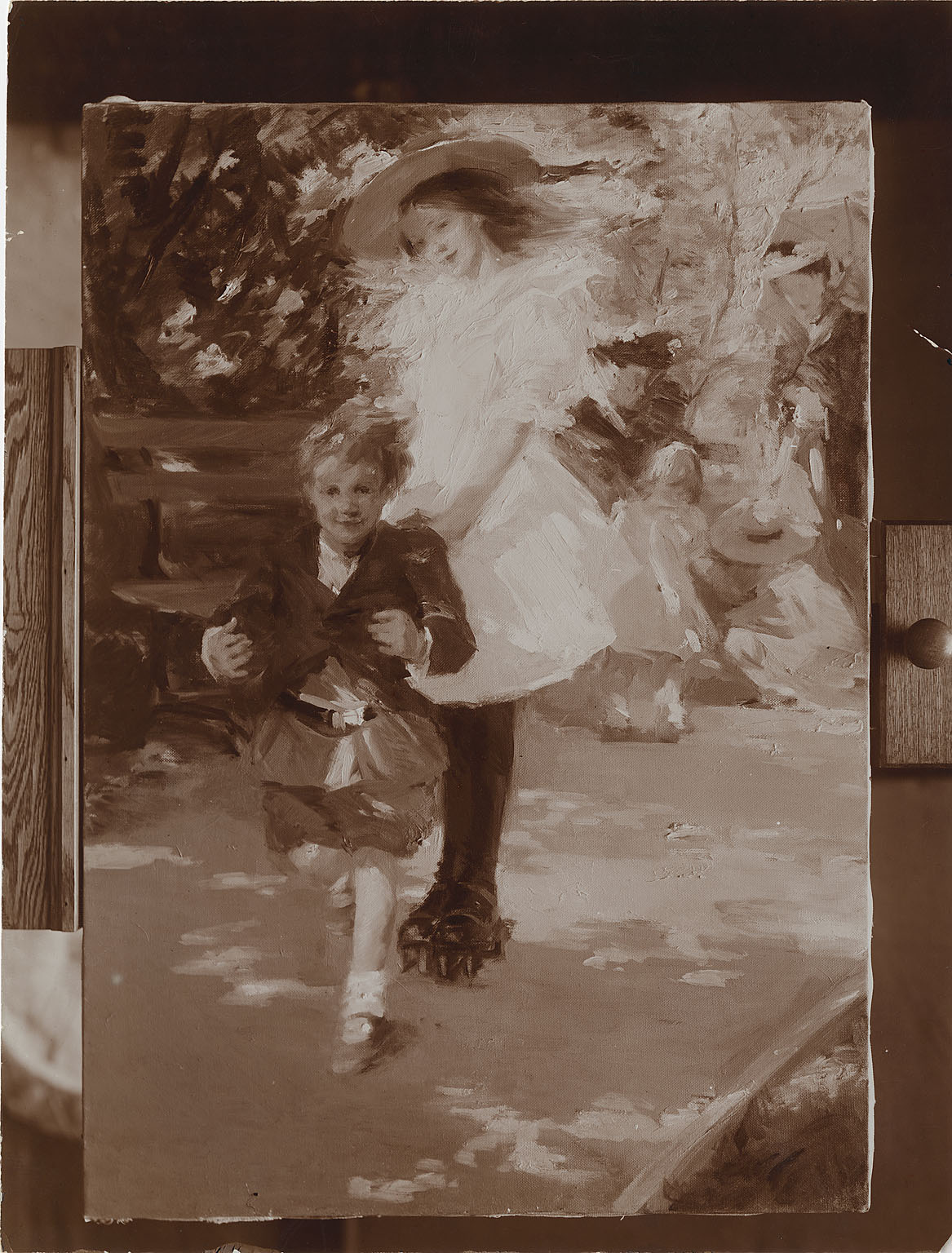
Photograph of painting "Roller Skates" by Elizabeth Sparhawk-Jones, 1908.

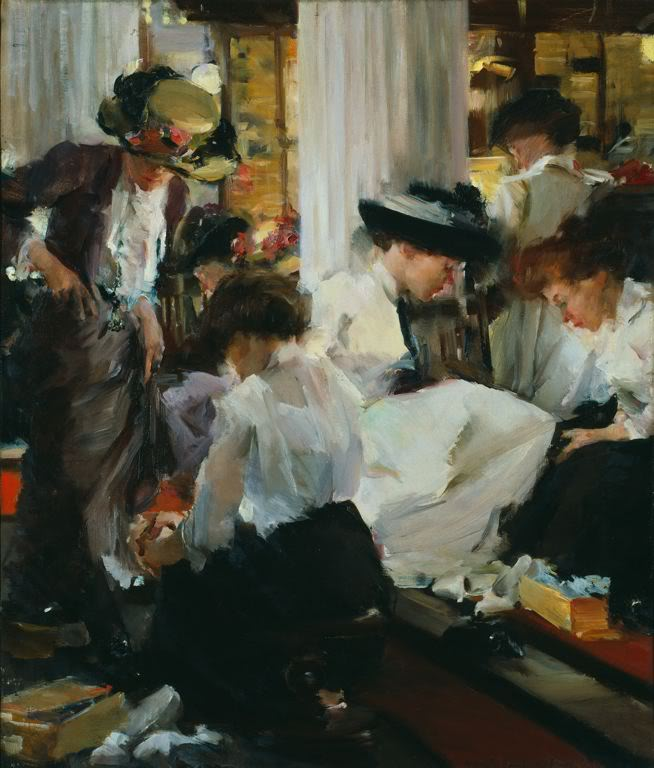
Elizabeth Sparhawk-Jones, Shoe Shop, 1911

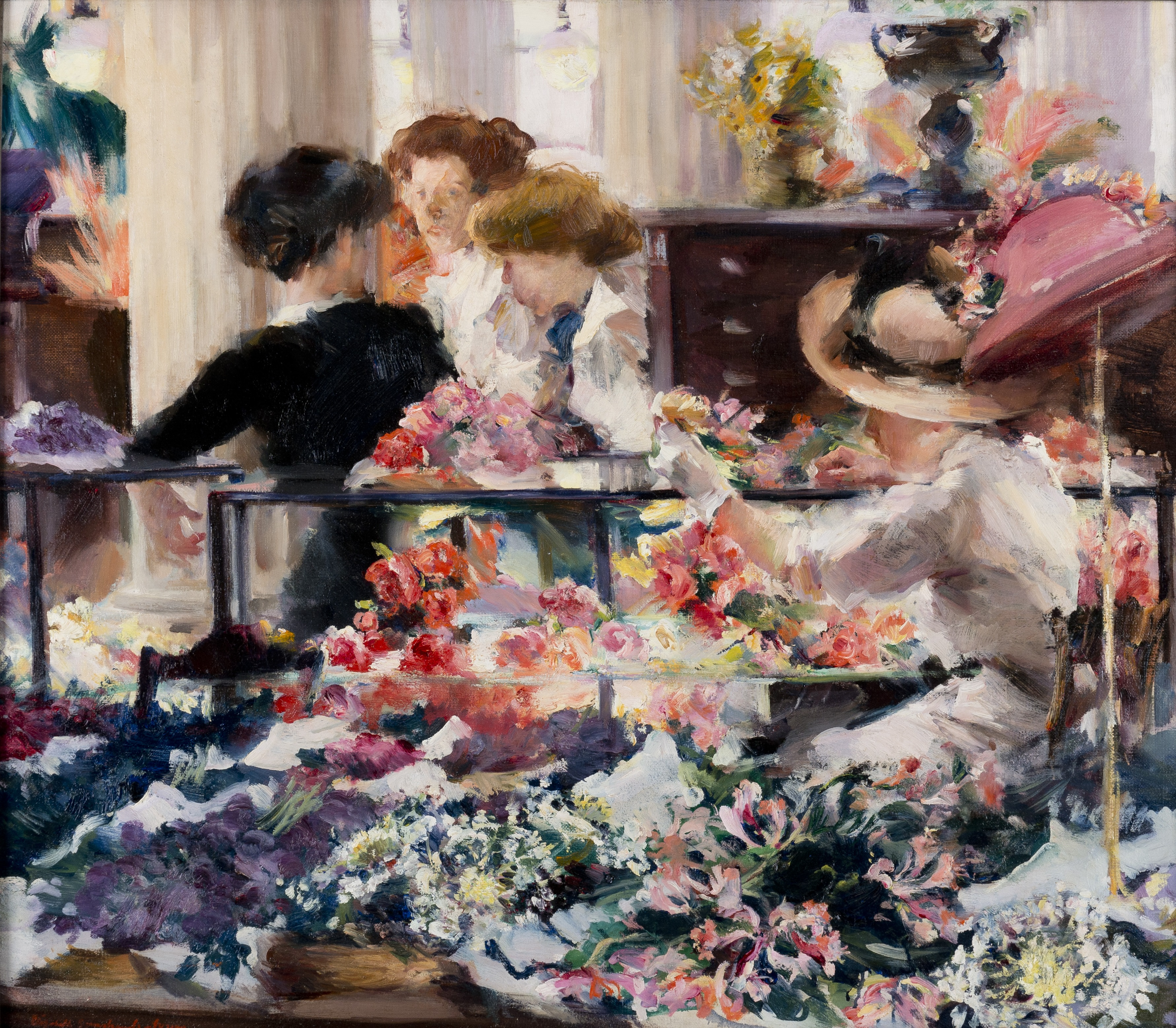
Elizabeth Sparhawk-Jones, In the Spring, 1912

Sparhawk-Jones was supporting herself through the sales of her oil and watercolor paintings by the time she was eighteen. She painted scenes of women reading or shopping as well as mothers and children walking through a park. Her Impressionist works, known for their vivid colors, were exhibited internationally in 1908, like the Carnegie Institute's international exhibition where she was the only woman to win anything and the only artist from the United States to receive an honorable mention. That year, The New York Times called her "the find of the year", having found her painting The Porch to be the "most unforgettable canvas" in the exhibition that they reviewed. Her use of color and expressive brush strokes were compared by art critics to William Merritt Chase's style.

She exhibited at the Pennsylvania Academy of the Fine Arts and in 1908 and 1912 was awarded the Mary Smith Prize. The 1908 prize was won for Roller Skates and the 1912 prize was won for a painting of a flower shop in Paris entitled In the Spring, noted for its radiant colors. Sparhawk-Jones's portrait, painted by Alice Kent Stoddard before 1911, is in the collection of the Pennsylvania Academy of the Fine Arts.

Shoe Shop, which she painted in 1911, captures the chaotic shopping excursions of the cosmopolitan New Women of the 20th century. This is compared to the more sedate painting by William Glackens entitled The Shoppers (1907). Both paintings, though, capture wealthy women who have a new-found interest in shopping in the city, evidenced by the crowded figures in the paintings. The Journal of the American Medical Association, which used Shoe Shop as its March 24, 1999 cover, described Sparhawk-Jones as "witty, spirited, and talented". She received positive critical attention for her paintings, but Sparhawk-Jones did not enjoy and avoided promoting her work.

Her painting Shop Girls c. 1912 was exhibited at the Art Institute of Chicago as part of an intention to pick "eye-popping" or "little masterpieces of compactness and stimulation" from American artists' works of the late 19th century and early 20th-century. Now in the Art Institute's collection, Shop Girls was the first woman's painting bought by the Friends of American Art of the Art Institute. It was purchased in 1913 from Sparhawk-Jones for $550. Women's paintings were not generally as revered as paintings by men, which could fetch several thousands of dollars per painting at that time. The painting was made into a poster in the 1980s by the New York Department of Labor, which had the following quotation:

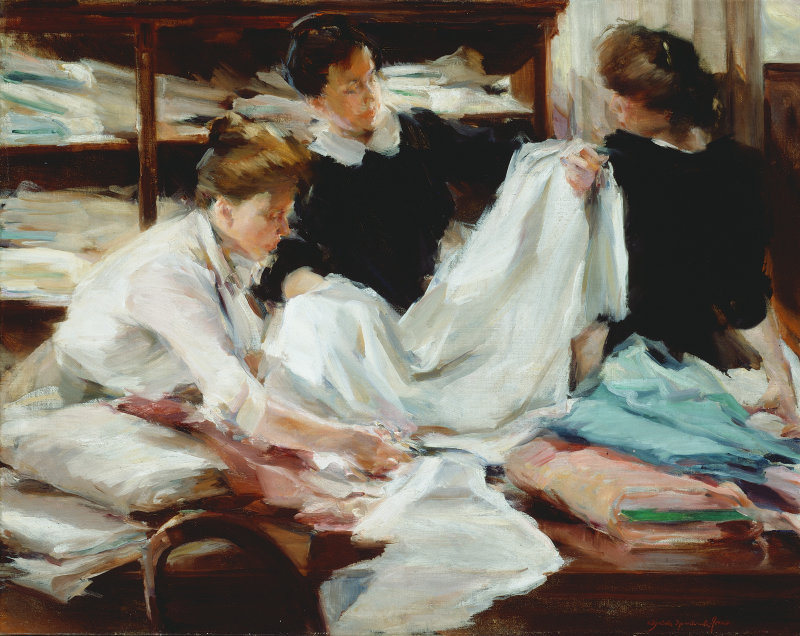
Elizabeth Sparhawk-Jones, Shop Girls, 1912

Over the years, radically different images have helped to shape America's ever changing view of the world of work. Perhaps nowhere is this phenomenon more evident than in the mixed signals America has sent to working women throughout our history. "Shop Girls," painted in 1912, is representative of the last vestiges of Victorian America. The reality for many working women in the early 20th century was confinement to jobs where they were routinely exploited—especially those who worked in mills and factories up to 70 hours a week for three dollars or less.

Around the time "Shop Girls" was being painted, 154 workers, mostly young women, died in the notorious Triangle Shirtwaist Company fire of 1911 in New York City...

The history of America's working women is a history of the advocacy of sharing, the right to vote, the right to unionize, the welfare of children and the extension of human rights to all. Despite the obstacles, despite the stereotypes imposed by society, theirs is a revolution still in the making.

— New York Department of Labor poster

=== Low point ===
She hit a low point in her career when she suffered from mental illness and was admitted to an asylum in 1913. She exhibited work in the mid 1910s, for example at the 1916 exhibition at the Pennsylvania Academy of the Fine Arts when she exhibited The Gardener.

=== Artist colonies ===
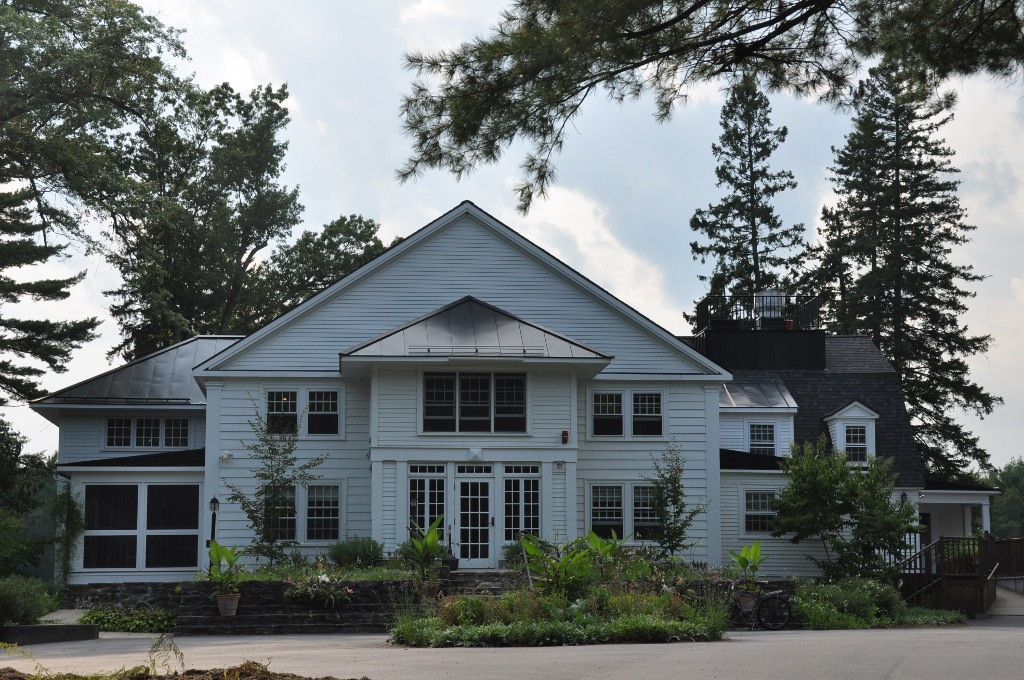
Main House, MacDowell Colony, Peterborough, New Hampshire

She was one of the resident painters in the MacDowell Colony, run by Marian MacDowell in Peterborough, New Hampshire. Lilla Cabot Perry was another of the resident painters. The colony provided residence and a place for men and women to develop their literary, artistic, or musical talent. Sparhawk-Jones was identified as one of the "men and women who have gone on to enrich American life". Among the other named influential people were Puerto Rican Governor and poet Luis Muñoz Marín, novelists Willa Cather and Thornton Wilder, and poet Edwin Arlington Robinson. According to Starhawk-Jones, she was there for a sum total of about ten years, and Robinson was there during each of her stays.

In 1928, she was a resident at Yaddo, a 400-acre estate and artist community in Saratoga Springs, New York founded by Spencer and Katrina Trask. She continued to receive invitations to visit Yaddo for one- to two-month stays over the years, and her works were exhibited with those of Yaddo residents after her stays, such as in 1956 when two of her watercolor paintings incorporated in a Yaddo exhibit at Schenectady Museum while she was living in Europe. Other former Yaddo residents include Langston Hughes, Katherine Anne Porter, Truman Capote, and Sylvia Plath.

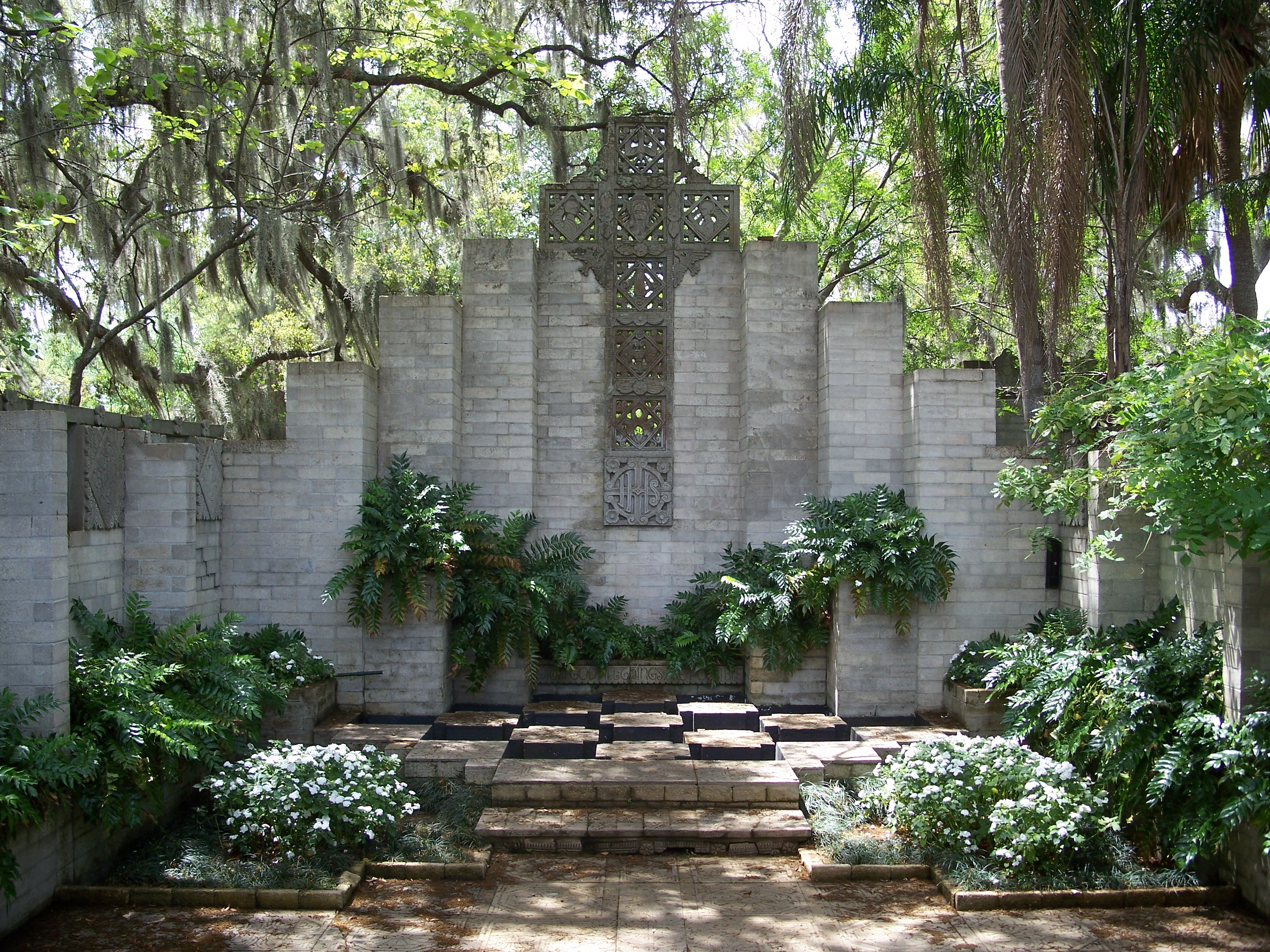
Research Institute, now Maitland Art Center, Maitland, Florida

For two or three years, she lived and worked in Florida at the Research Institute (now Maitland Art Center), which was run by Mary Louise Curtis Bok, later the wife of Efrem Zimbalist, and Andre Smith. Her works were exhibited at the Research Studio Gallery in late March and early April 1940.

=== Later career ===
She encouraged gallery and Pennsylvania Academy of the Fine Arts shows of the works of self-taught Horace Pippin, of whom she said: "For me he is one of the few real artists in our century, when he is at his best."

In the 1940 book Pennsylvania; a Guide to the Keystone State, Sparhawk-Jones was identified as one of the state's "important young artists". William Alexander Newman Dorland also identified her as a talented woman painter, along with Cecilia Beaux and other American and English painters in his book The Sum of Feminine Achievement. She reestablished a successful career of modern works in the 1940s, during which she lived in Philadelphia. Sparhawk-Jones has particularly had a following in Chicago and Philadelphia.

In 1940, she combined watercolor and oil in The Generations. Of her talent, realized in the painting, Marsden Hartley said, "It seems to be with something of a mental rapier that she conceives her subject matter for [her] pictures border on the exceptionally forceful and they are different in thought, as well as execution, from the work of most of the soft painters among men and women. She is a thinking painter with a rare sense of the drama of poetic and romantic incident."

Comparison to Sparhawk-Jones' The Dreamer

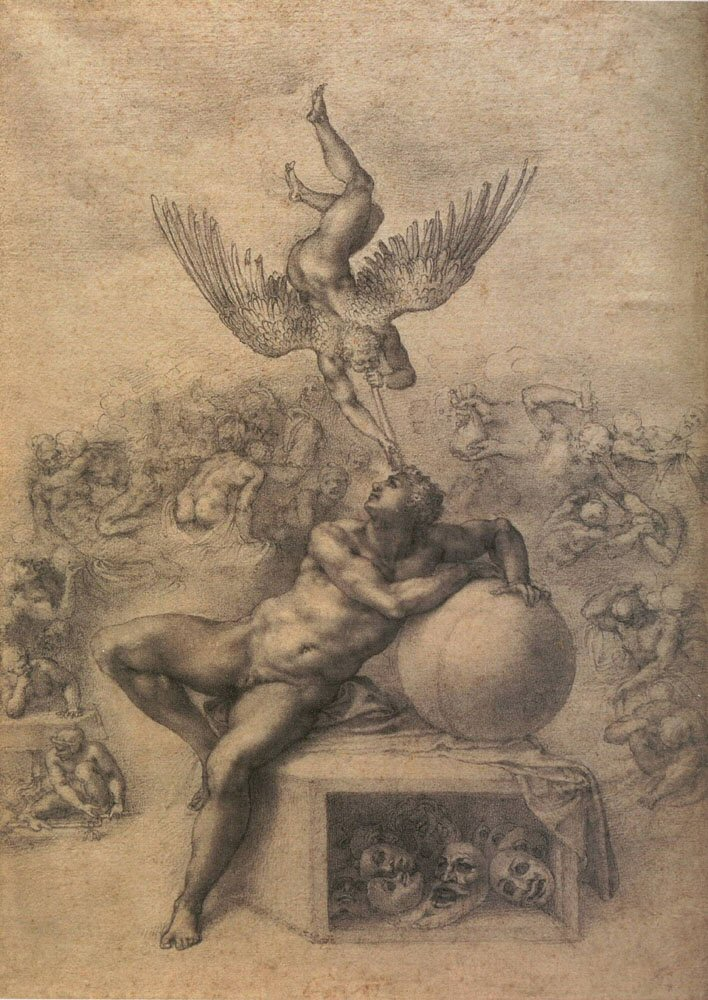
Michelangelo, The Dream, c. 1533, Courtauld Institute of Art, London

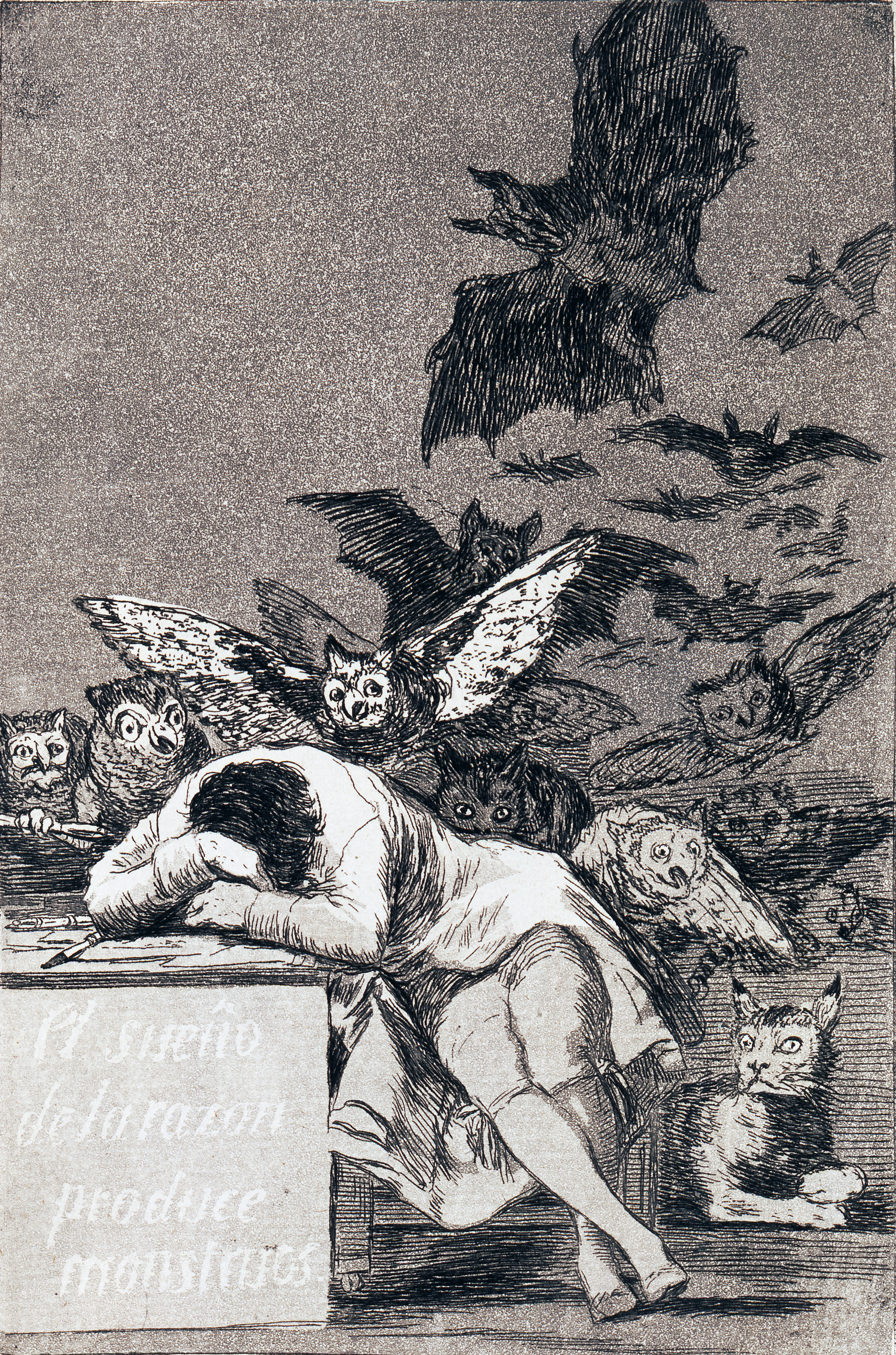
Francisco Goya's Capricho 43: The Sleep of Reason Produces Monsters, 1799, Museum of Fine Arts, Budapest

She painted with watercolor in the 1940s, producing works such as The Dreamer which is in the permanent collection of the Delaware Art Museum.

Curator Heather Campbell Coyle compared it to Michelangelo's The Dream (c.1533) and Francisco Goya's Capricho 43: The Sleep of Reason Produces Monsters (1799). In Sparhawk-Jones' painting, the dreamer is a sleeping nude woman surrounded by images that seem to reflect her eerie nightmare. A skeleton lies against a stone in the foreground and above her nude women are carried by "winged creatures" into the darkness. Women are also carried away by men with wings, dressed in business suits. The painting has a composition similar to Michelangelo's painting, but Coyle states that, to her, the work is more similar to Goya's painting that also includes winged creatures above the sleeping subject of the painting.

Sparhawk-Jones was called a phenomenon in 1944 in an American Artist magazine, in which the author questioned, "Strange, that she is not recognized far and wide as among the ablest, most distinguished women painters in the United States." Sparhawk-Jones may not have attained greater fame, because at that time there was a "glass ceiling" for women artists that prevented them from attaining significant notoriety, according to biographer Townsend Ludington. Jerry Saltz of the Village Voice, for example, found that modern women painters, born 1879 to 1969, only accounted for 5% of the paintings in the Museum of Modern Art's permanent collection, which includes one of her paintings, Startled Woman. Barbara Lehman Smith postulated about additional theories. For instance, it could also have been because she didn't promote her paintings, further complicated by her destruction of paintings when she was ill. Another theory is that she was not taken seriously because of her periods of mental illness.

An exhibition of her watercolor paintings was held at PAFA in April 1948. Beginning in the mid-1950s and into the mid-1960s, she lived and enjoyed painting in Paris at the Saint Roman hotel near Tuileries Garden and the Louvre. Her work was featured in a story in the summer 1954 issue of the New Mexico Quarterly. Sparhawk-Jones was described as an emotional painter who created spiritual works of art in the 1960s. She was interviewed in 1964 for an oral history project by Ruth Gurin Bowman, curator of New York University's art collection, who gave the interview materials to the Archives of American Art. That year she won an award for her painting of a seascape at the Silvermine Guild of Artists show in New England.

== Death and legacy ==
Sparhawk-Jones died on December 26, 1968, in a hospital in Connecticut. She was buried in the same cemetery as her parents in Immanuel Episcopal Church, Glencoe, Maryland; her sister was later buried there too.

Papers about Sparhawk-Jones' career, including exhibition catalogs, sketches, artist's statements, and newspaper clippings are held at the Victor Building in the Smithsonian American Art Museum / National Portrait Gallery Library. In 2010, Elizabeth Sparhawk-Jones: The Artist Who Lived Twice, a biography of her life, was written and published by Barbara Lehman Smith. Her research included four boxes of materials that had originally belonged to Sparhawk-Jones that were inadvertently included with Smith's boxes during an office move from Trimbush, (Note: In the 1960s, Margaret Turnbull sold Trimbush, built by Bayard Turnbull in 1925, and La Paix, built by Lawrence Turnbull in 1885, and the surrounding land to St. Joseph Medical Center in Baltimore.) the former home of Margaret Carroll Jones Turnbull, to another St. Joseph Medical Center location about 1993.

== Collections ==
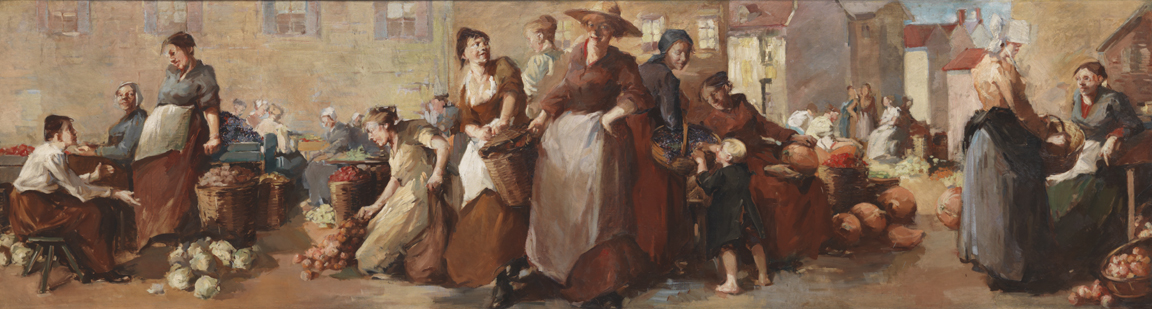
Elizabeth Sparhawk Jones, The Market, 1909, Pennsylvania Academy of Fine Arts, Philadelphia

Actor Claude Rains was a collector of her works. Her works in private collections are valued up to $250,000 and are in the following public collections:

- Art Institute of Chicago
  - Shoe Shop, c. 1911, oil on canvas
  - Shop Girls, c. 1912, oil
- Delaware Art Museum – The Dreamer, c. 1942, tempora on board
- Metropolitan Museum of Art – Caryatides, 1940 watercolor on linen
- Museum of Modern Art – Startled Woman, c. 1956, oil on canvas
- Pennsylvania Academy of the Fine Arts
  - The Market, before 1909, oil
  - Woman with Fish, 1936 or 1937, oil on canvas
- Whitney Museum of American Art – The Sea Claims its Own, 1961, oil on canvas
- Wichita Art Museum – The Generations, c. 1942, watercolor and oil on silk
