= TOSC =

TOSC may refer to:

- Total oxidant scavenging capacity, a quantification of the absorbance capacity of antioxidants toward potent oxidants
- Tournament of State Champions

Tosc may refer:

- Tosc (mountain), a peak in the Julian Alps

== See also ==
- Tošč, a hill in Slovenia
