= Mitch Stadium =

Baseball field in Kenova, West Virginia

- "The Mitch"

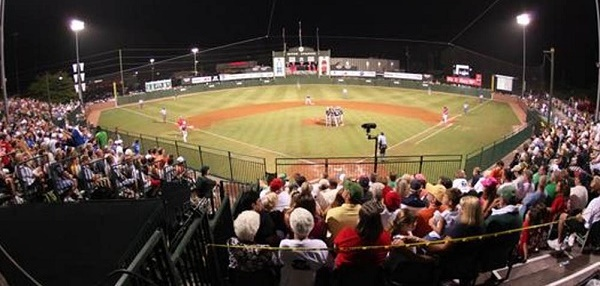
- Interactive map of Mitch Stadium
- Location: 600 Poplar Street; Kenova, WV 25530
- Coordinates: 38.39568°N 82.56512°W
- Owner: Town of Ceredo, WV
- Capacity: 2,000
- Surface: Bluegrass
- Field size: Left Field - 196 ft Left-Center - 205 ft Center Field - 205 ft Right-Center - 205 ft Right Field - 198 ft

Construction
- Groundbreaking: 1955
- Opened: April 10, 1955

Tenants
- Ceredo-Kenova Little League; Tournament of State Champions

Crowd gathers at Mitch Stadium

Mitch Stadium is a baseball field located on the boundary line between the Town of Ceredo and the City of Kenova in West Virginia. It is home to the Ceredo-Kenova Little League and numerous annual community events. The stadium was created in 1955 and is named in honor of Elmer "Big Mitch" Mitchell, who served as groundskeeper at the facility for 27 years until his death in 1981. The facility at Mitch Stadium has previously hosted concerts, youth football and soccer events, and community carnivals and festivals. "The Mitch" has hosted 7 West Virginia Little League State Tournaments, the 1965 Little League Divisional Tournament, the 2009 Little League 2009 Little League Southeast Regional baseball and softball tournaments, and served as the initial host of the Little League 9-10 Year-Old Tournament of State Champions.

== Tournament of State Champions ==
Little League baseball champions in the 9-10 Year-Old Division from ten states (Alabama, Florida, Georgia, Indiana, Kentucky, North Carolina, South Carolina, Tennessee, Virginia, and West Virginia) traveled annually to Mitch Stadium for the annual Tournament of State Champions (TOSC), the first Little League sanctioned tournament in the age division from its inception in 2005 through 2013. Following the 2013 edition of the tournament, the TOSC moved to Elm Street Park in Greenville, NC.

== Good Samaritan Soles 5K ==
The Good Samaritan Soles 5K is an annual 5K race occurring on Labor Day and serves as a fundraiser for the Good Samaritan Center in Kenova, WV. The event draws hundreds of racers each year, and starts and ends at Mitch Stadium.
