= Fort Maitland =

Coordinates: 28.6205°N 81.3648°W

Fort Maitland was a military fort built by the United States Army at what is now Maitland, Florida. It was built in November 1838 as a supply depot during the Second Seminole War. The fort was named after Captain W. S. Maitland, who was injured during the Battle of Wahoo Swamp and later killed himself after 9 months of trying to recover from his injuries.

== See also ==
- Chris Kimball's website on Second Seminole Indian War ~down 7-17-2014
- Fort Maitland's history from official city website
