= Timothy Plan =

- Founded: 1994; 32 years ago
- Founder: Arthur Ally
- Headquarters: Maitland, Florida, United States
- Website: timothyplan.com

Timothy Plan is an American mutual fund company founded in 1994 and headquartered in Maitland, Florida that promotes their products as being the first investments of their type to utilize biblically based screens as the first criteria in the selection of its investment portfolios of companies. The company was founded by Arthur Ally, formerly of Lehman Brothers, who wanted to cater retirement investments to socially conservative Christian American pastors. The company states they are non-Demominational Christian in orientation and their name is taken from passages in Timothy 1.

The fund family avoids companies that support or profit from abortion, pornography, gambling, alcohol and tobacco production, violations of child labor laws, supporting terrorist nations as defined by the US Government, or entertainment, lifestyles or marriages the company perceives as contrary to Biblical principles. The fund family is categorized as Biblically responsible investment (BRI). Its ultimate goal is to provide an alternative investment that allows Christian and socially conservative investors to align their investment portfolio with their beliefs. Timothy Plan constantly monitors the holdings in its investment portfolios to determine if any of the companies have changed their policies and procedures subsequent to being placed into the portfolio. Beyond religious principles, Timothy Plan investments are categorized by common investing criteria such as mutual funds or exchange traded funds based on American companies by size (large or small market capitalization), growth stocks or value stocks, investments in companies outside the United States, and fixed income.

In 2019, Ally published the book Invested With Purpose to describe the history and goals of Timothy Plan.

== Funds ==
ETFs offered by Timothy Plan are listed on the New York Stock Exchange (NYSE):

The Timothy Plan Mutual Funds

· Aggressive Growth Fund
· Conservative Growth Fund (a fund of funds)
· Defensive Strategies Fund (a non-diversified fund)
· Fixed Income Fund
· Growth & Income Fund
· High Yield Bond Fund
· International Fund
· Israel Common Values Fund
· Large/ Mid Cap Growth Fund
· Large/Mid-cap Growth Fund
· Small Cap Value Fund
· Strategic Growth Fund (a fund of funds)

The Timothy Plan Exchange Traded Funds (ETFs)

· High Dividend Stock ETF
· International ETF
· US Large/Mid Cap Core ETF
· US Small Cap Core ETF

The class I shares are offered exclusively through registered investment advisors.
