= Art and History Museums - Maitland =

Museum in Maitland, Florida

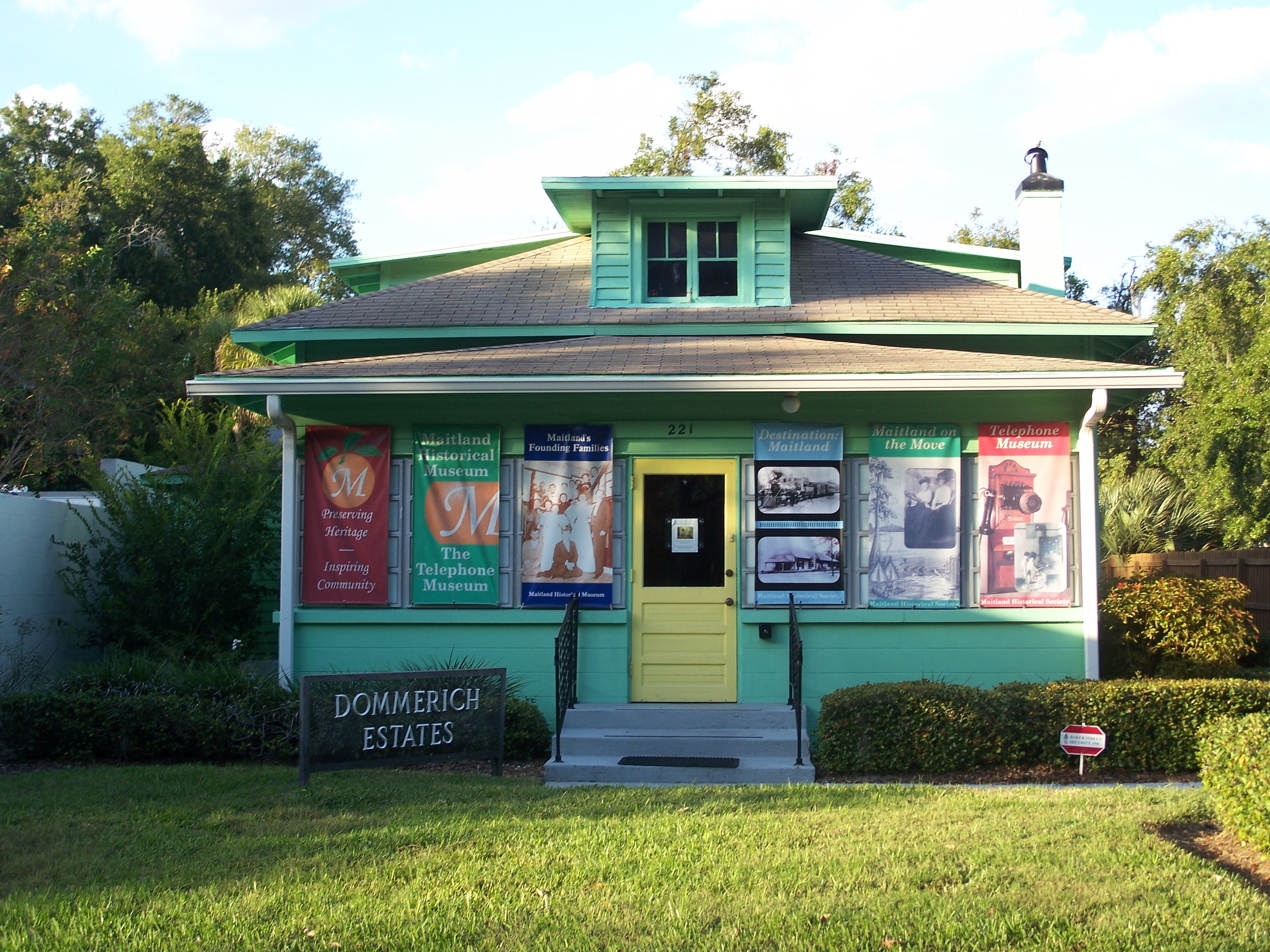
Maitland's Art and History Museum, also the Telephone Museum.

Art and History Museums - Maitland, sometimes styled Art & History Museums - Maitland, and originally called the Maitland Art and History Association is a museum and arts center in Maitland, Florida.

The center was established in 2010 from a merger of the Maitland Art Center, known for its bungalow colony, and Maitland Historical Society when the city allowed the new entity to oversee the Art Center location. The Art Center was named Florida's national historic landmark. Subsequent to the original merger, the Telephone, Waterhouse Residence and Carpentry Shop Museums were added to the organization to tell a broader history of Central Florida.

The Research Studio, opened by Andre Smith in 1937 and the core of the old art center prior to its 1959 closure due to its founder's death, is also now part of the combined organization.

Andrea Bailey Cox served as president and executive director from 2010 through her December 2016 departure.
