= Tournament of State Champions =

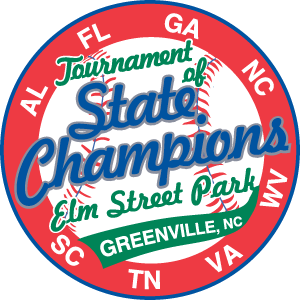

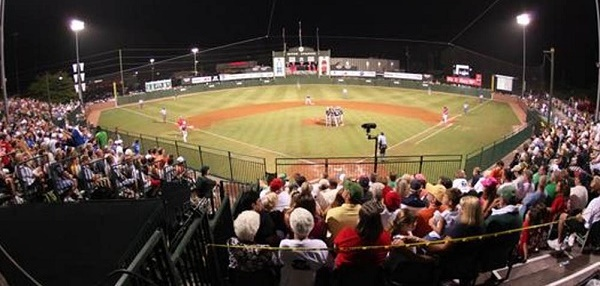
Mitch Stadium

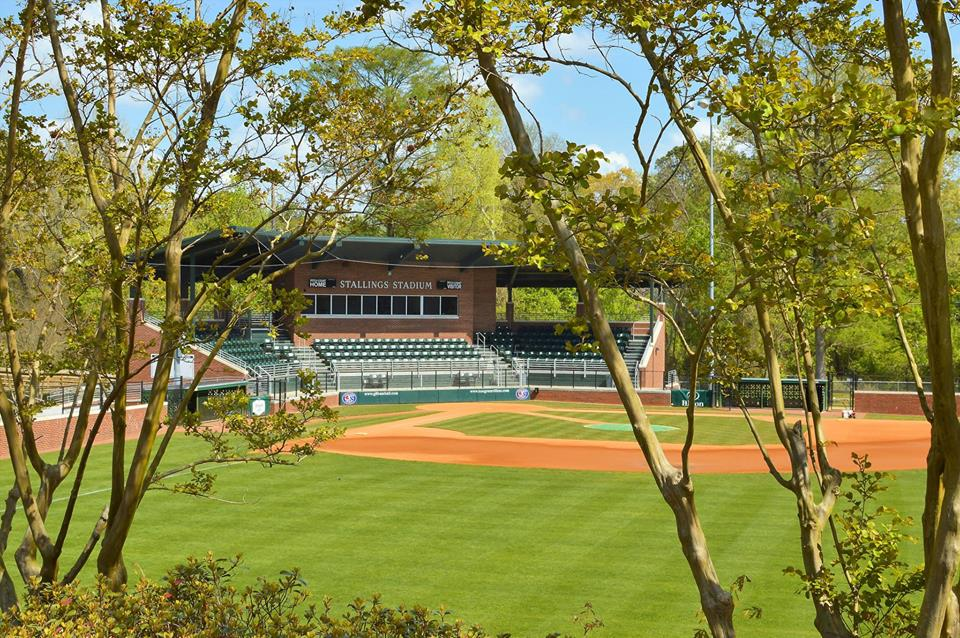
Stallings Stadium at Elm Street Park

The Tournament of State Champions (TOSC) is an annual Little League Baseball tournament featuring 8-10-year-old and 9-11-year-old state champions. The 8-10 tournament was first held in August 2005 at Mitch Stadium, located upon the town borders of Ceredo, West Virginia and Kenova, West Virginia. The 9-11 tournament was first held in August 2010 at Elm Street Park, located in Greenville, NC. In 2022, Wilson City Little League Wilson, NC became the host site. Wilson City Little League is home to Southern Bank Stadium!

In 2009, the Tournament of State Champions was played in Huntington, West Virginia while Mitch Stadium was the location of the 2009 Little League Baseball and Softball Southeast Regional Tournaments. The 2019 Tournament of State Champions will be hosted at Stallings Stadium at Elm Street Park in Greenville, NC.

The participating states in the tournament are Alabama, Florida, Georgia, North Carolina, South Carolina, Tennessee, Virginia, and West Virginia (Indiana and Kentucky participated in the first four tournaments). Over 1,000 registered 8-10 year-old and 9-11 year old teams begin play each June in these eight states.

== TOSC Championship Games ==
Year	Winner	Score	Runner-Up	Tournament Site
2005 9-10	Dumfries-Triangle-Quantico LL (Virginia) Dumfries, VA	5-4	Columbus American LL (Georgia (U.S. state)) Columbus, GA	Ceredo-Kenova, WV
2006 9-10	(Florida) Citrus Park LL Citrus Park, FL	10-0	(Tennessee) Lexington LL Lexington, TN	Ceredo-Kenova, WV
2007 9-10	(Georgia (U.S. state)) Warner Robins American LL Warner Robins, GA	6-3	(North Carolina) Weddington American LL Weddington, NC	Ceredo-Kenova, WV
2008 9-10	(Georgia (U.S. state)) Columbus American LL Columbus, GA	6-5	(Virginia) SYA East LL Centreville, VA	Ceredo-Kenova, WV
2009 9-10	(Alabama) Westside LL Mobile, AL	7-6	(Florida) South Fort Myers LL Fort Myers, FL	Huntington, WV Jerry Straub Stadium Dot Hicks Field
2010 9-10	(Georgia (U.S. state)) Columbus American LL Columbus, GA	5-4	(West Virginia) Bridgeport LL Bridgeport, WV	Ceredo-Kenova, WV
2010 10-11	(Alabama) Westside LL Mobile, AL	12-11	(Florida) Maitland LL Maitland, FL	Greenville, NC
2011 9-10	(Florida) Plant City LL Plant City, FL	3-1	(Virginia) Bridgewater Community LL Bridgewater, VA	Ceredo-Kenova, WV
2011 10-11	(North Carolina) Weddington National LL Weddington, NC	6-3	(Tennessee) Goodlettsville LL Goodlettsville, TN	Greenville, NC
2012 9-10	(Florida) North Springs LL Coral Springs, FL	14-3	(South Carolina) Anderson American LL Anderson, SC	Ceredo-Kenova, WV
2012 10-11	Plant City LL (Florida) Plant City, FL	4-1	Goodlettsville LL (Tennessee) Goodlettsville, TN	Greenville, NC
2013 9-10	Keystone LL (Florida) Odessa, FL	12-6	Goodlettsville LL (Tennessee) Goodlettsville, TN	Ceredo-Kenova, WV
2013 10-11	North Springs LL (Florida) Coral Springs, FL	13-4	Martinez-Evans LL (Georgia (U.S. state)) Evans, GA	Greenville, NC
2014 9-10	Northwood LL (South Carolina) Taylors, SC	6-4	Goodlettsville LL (Tennessee) Goodlettsville, TN	Greenville, NC
2014 10-11	Wilson City LL (North Carolina) Wilson, NC	3-2	Keystone LL (Florida) Odessa, FL	Greenville, NC
2015 9-10	East Surry LL (North Carolina) Pilot Mountain, NC	5-2	Loudoun South National LL (Virginia) Loudoun County, VA	Greenville, NC
2015 10-11	Northern LL (Georgia (U.S. state)) Columbus, GA	15-5	Vienna American LL (Virginia) Vienna, VA	Greenville, NC
2016 8-10	Loudoun South American LL (Virginia) Loudoun County, VA	9-7	Northwood LL (South Carolina) Taylors, SC	Greenville, NC
2016 9-11	Northern LL (Georgia (U.S. state)) Columbus, GA	13-10	North State LL (North Carolina) Greenville, NC	Greenville, NC
2017 8-10	Tar Heel LL (North Carolina) Greenville, NC	11-7	Northwood LL (South Carolina) Taylors, SC	Greenville, NC
2017 9-11	Tar Heel LL (North Carolina) Greenville, NC	5-2	Plant City LL (Florida) Plant City, FL	Greenville, NC
2018 8-10	Winston-Salem National LL (North Carolina) Winston-Salem, NC	8-6	Northwood LL (South Carolina) Taylors, SC	Greenville, NC
2018 9-11	Smyrna LL (Georgia (U.S. state)) Smyrna, GA	15-4	Tar Heel LL (North Carolina) Greenville, NC	Greenville, NC
2019 8-10	Tar Heel LL (North Carolina) Greenville, NC	12-2	Loudoun South American LL (Virginia) South Riding, VA	Greenville, NC
2019 9-11	Northwood LL (South Carolina) Taylors, SC	11-3	Atlee LL (Virginia) Mechanicsville, VA	Greenville, NC

== 8-10 All Time Participating teams ==
Alabama

Year	League	City
2006	Phenix City American	Phenix City
2007	Westside	Mobile
2008	Huntsville Eastern	Huntsville
2009	Westside	Mobile
2010	Huntsville Eastern	Huntsville
2011	Huntsville American	Huntsville
2012	Phenix City American	Phenix City
2013	Phenix City National	Phenix City
2014	Phenix City National	Phenix City
2015	McCalla	McCalla
2016	McCalla	McCalla
2017	Ladonia	Phenix City
2018	Huntsville Eastern	Huntsville

Florida

Year	League	City
2006	Citrus Park	Tampa
2007	Viera/Suntree	Melbourne
2008	Greater Naples	Naples
2009	South Fort Myers	Fort Myers
2010	South Fort Myers	Fort Myers
2011	Plant City	Plant City
2012	North Springs	Coral Springs
2013	Keystone	Odessa
2014	Fort Pierce	Fort Pierce
2015	Plant City	Plant City
2016	Plant City	Plant City
2017	San Carlos	Fort Myers
2018	Sarasota National	Sarasota
2019	Tampa Bay	Tampa
2022	Northeast	St. Petersburg

(Georgia (U.S. state)) Georgia

Year	League	City
2005	American	Columbus
2006	Warner Robins American	Warner Robins
2007	Warner Robins American	Warner Robins
2008	American	Columbus
2009	American	Columbus
2010	American	Columbus
2011	American	Columbus
2012	Northern	Columbus
2013	Oconee County	Watkinsville
2014	American	Columbus
2015	Murphey Candler	Brookhaven
2016	Cartersville	Cartersville
2017	Northern	Columbus
2018	Northern	Columbus
2019	Northern	Columbus
2022	Northern	Columbus

North Carolina

Year	League	City
2005	Weddington	Weddington
2006	Southwest Forsyth	Clemmons
2007	Weddington American	Weddington
2008	Tar Heel	Greenville
2009	Kernersville	Kernersville
2010	Tar Heel	Greenville
2011	Bull City	Durham
2012	North State	Greenville
2013	Wilson City	Wilson
2014	Myers Park Trinity	Charlotte
2015	East Surry	Pilot Mountain
2016	South Durham	Durham
2017	Tar Heel	Greenville
2018	Winston-Salem National	Winston-Salem
2019	Tar Heel	Greenville
2019	Wilson City (NC Runner Up)	Wilson
2022	Tar Heel	Greenville
2022	Wilson City (NC Runner Up)	Wilson

South Carolina

Year	League	City
2005	Irmo	Irmo
2006	Northwood	Taylors
2007	Greenville	Greenville
2008	Irmo	Irmo
2009	Irmo	Irmo
2010	Irmo	Irmo
2011	Northwood	Taylors
2012	Anderson American	Anderson
2013	Irmo	Irmo
2014	Northwood	Taylors
2015	Irmo	Irmo
2016	Northwood	Taylors
2017	Northwood	Taylors
2018	Northwood	Taylors
2019	Irmo	Irmo
2022	Northwood	Taylors

Tennessee

Year	League	City
2005	Tullahoma National	Tullahoma
2006	Lexington	Lexington
2007	Tullahoma National	Tullahoma
2008	Donelson	Donelson
2009	Estill Springs	Estill Springs
2010	Clarksville National	Clarksville
2011	Goodlettsville	Goodlettsville
2012	Karns	Karns
2013	Goodlettsville	Goodlettsville
2014	Goodlettsville	Goodlettsville
2015	Tullahoma	Tullahoma
2016	Goodlettsville	Goodlettsville
2017	Tullahoma	Tullahoma
2018	Goodlettsville	Goodlettsville
2019	Goodlettsville	Goodlettsville
2022	Goodlettsville	Goodlettsville
2024	Nolensville	Nolensville

Virginia

Year	League	City
2005	Dumfries - Triangle - Quantico	Dumfries
2006	Southwestern Youth Association	Centreville
2007	Grottoes	Grottoes
2008	Southwestern Youth Association	Centreville
2009	Bridgewater Community	Bridgewater
2010	Atlee	Atlee
2011	Bridgewater Community	Bridgewater
2012	Mechanicsville National	Mechanicsville
2013	Mechanicsville National	Mechanicsville
2014	Vienna American	Vienna
2015	Loudoun South National	Loudoun County
2016	Loudoun South American	Loudoun County
2017	Vienna American	Vienna
2018	Tuckahoe American	Henrico
2019	Loudoun South American	South Riding
2022	Tuckahoe American	Henrico

West Virginia

Year	League	City
2005	Martinsburg	Martinsburg
2006	Jefferson County	Jefferson County
2007	Fringe	Barrackville
2008	Ripley	Ripley
2009	Ripley	Ripley
2010	Bridgeport	Bridgeport
2011	Charleston Central	Charleston
2012	Bridgeport	Bridgeport
2013	Bridgeport	Bridgeport
2014	Bridgeport	Bridgeport
2015	Martinsburg	Martinsburg
2016	Ona	Ona
2017	Barboursville	Barboursville
2018	Vinson	Huntington
2019	Jefferson County	Shenandoah Junction
2020		
2021		
2022	Huntington	Huntington
2023	Barboursville	Barboursville
2024	Barboursville	Barboursville

== 9-11 All Time Participating teams ==
Alabama

Year	League	City
2010	Westside	Mobile
2011	Phenix City American	Phenix City
2012	Beehive	Auburn
2013	Jackson	Jackson
2014	Choctaw - Washington	Gilbertown
2015	Jackson	Jackson
2016	Huntsville International	Huntsville
2017	Huntsville International	Huntsville
2018	Huntsville International	Huntsville
2019	Huntsville Eastern	Huntsville

Florida

Year	League	City
2010	Maitland	Maitland
2011	Plant City	Plant City
2012	Plant City	Plant City
2013	North Springs	Coral Springs
2014	Keystone	Odessa
2015	North Palm Beach County	North Palm Beach
2016	Oviedo	Oviedo
2017	Plant City	Plant City
2018	Martin County North	Palm City
2019	North Springs	Coral Springs
2020		
2021		
2022		
2023	Keystone	Odessa
2025	Chaires-Capitola	Tallahassee

(Georgia (U.S. state)) Georgia

Year	League	City
2010	Warner Robins American	Warner Robins
2011	Masters City	Augusta
2012	Northern	Columbus
2013	Martinez-Evans	Evans
2014	Smyrna	Smyrna
2015	Northern	Columbus
2016	Northern	Columbus
2017	Northern	Columbus
2018	Smyrna	Smyrna
2019	Warner Robins American	Warner Robins

North Carolina

Year	League	City
2010	Tar Heel	Greenville
2011	Weddington National	Weddington
2012	Bull City	Durham
2013	Myers Park Trinity	Charlotte
2014	Wilson City	Wilson
2015	Myers Park Trinity	Charlotte
2016	North State	Greenville
2017	Tar Heel	Greenville
2018	Tar Heel	Greenville
2019	Myers Park Trinity	Charlotte

South Carolina

Year	League	City
2010	Easley	Easley
2011	Irmo	Irmo
2012	Northwood	Taylors
2013	Greenwood Abbeville	Greenwood
2014	Irmo	Irmo
2015	Northwood	Taylors
2016	Greenville	Greenville
2017	Laurens	Laurens
2018	Northwood	Taylors
2019	Northwood	Taylors

Tennessee

Year	League	City
2010	Clarksville National	Clarksville
2011	Goodlettsville	Goodlettsville
2012	Goodlettsville	Goodlettsville
2013	Goodlettsville	Goodlettsville
2014	Goodlettsville	Goodlettsville
2015	Goodlettsville	Goodlettsville
2016	Tullahoma	Tullahoma
2017	American Legion Post 17	Gallatin
2018	Goodlettsville	Goodlettsville
2019	Goodlettsville	Goodlettsville

Virginia

Year	League	City
2010	Chantilly American	Chantilly
2011	Great Falls	Great Falls
2012	West Springfield American	Springfield
2013	Chantilly National	Chantilly
2014	Mechanicsville National	Mechanicsville
2015	Vienna American	Vienna
2016	Atlee	Mechanicsville
2017	Louisa	Louisa
2018	Loudoun South American	Loudoun County
2019	Atlee	Mechanicsville

West Virginia

Year	League	City
2010	Fairmont	Fairmont
2011	St. Albans	St. Albans
2012	Martinsburg	Martinsburg
2013	Bridgeport	Bridgeport
2014	Bridgeport	Bridgeport
2015	Bridgeport	Bridgeport
2016	Bridgeport	Bridgeport
2017	Barboursville	Barboursville
2018	Barboursville	Barboursville
2019	Bi-State	Fort Ashby
