= William H. Waterhouse House =

Historic house in Florida, United States

- U.S. National Register of Historic Places
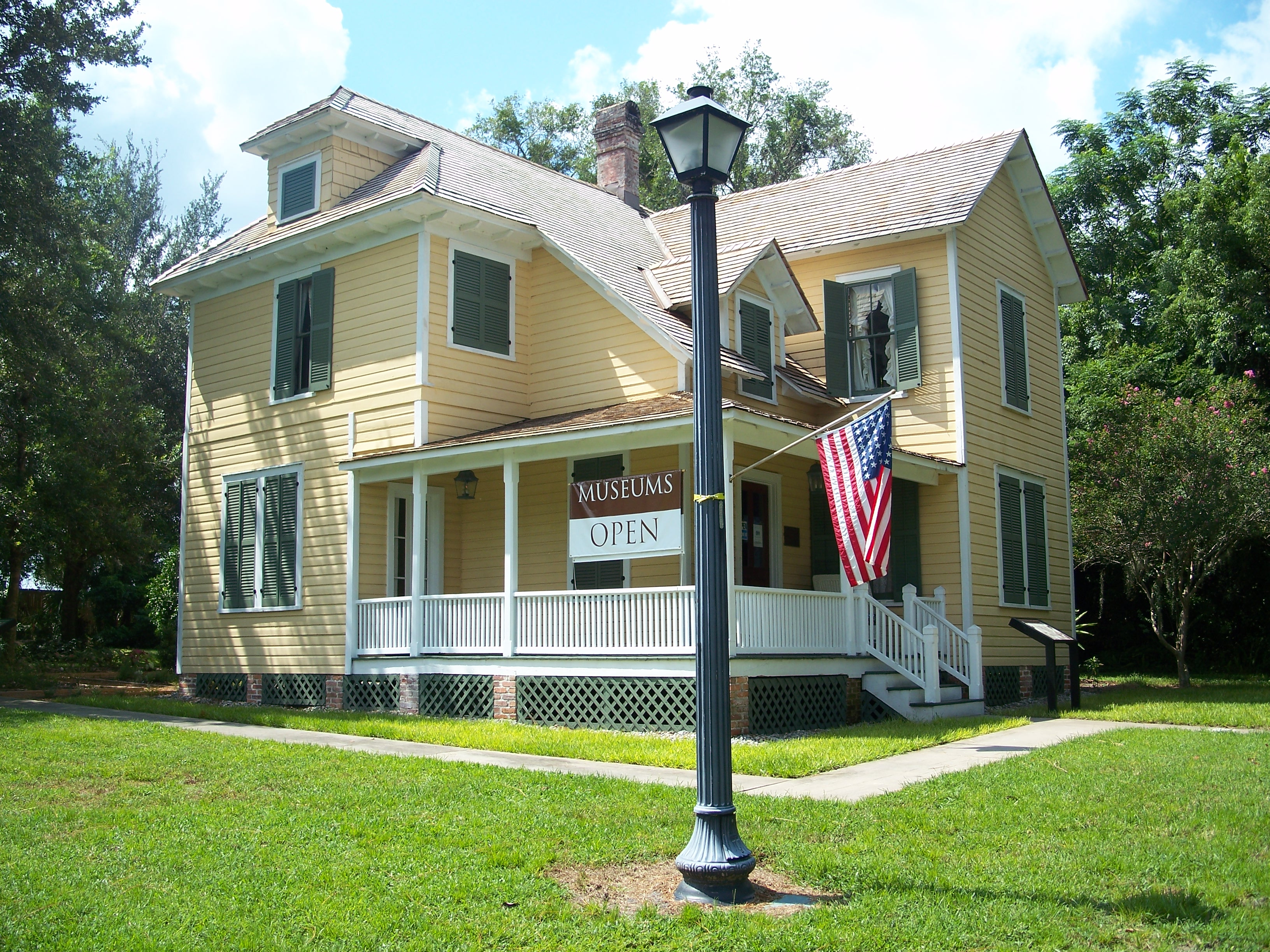
- William H. Waterhouse House, September 2007

- Location within Florida Location within the United States
- Location: Maitland, Florida
- Coordinates: 28°37′15″N 81°22′2″W
- Built: 1884
- NRHP reference No.: 83001434
- Added to NRHP: February 2, 1983

The William H. Waterhouse House is a historic residence in Maitland, Florida, United States, that is listed on the National Register of Historic Places.

== Description ==
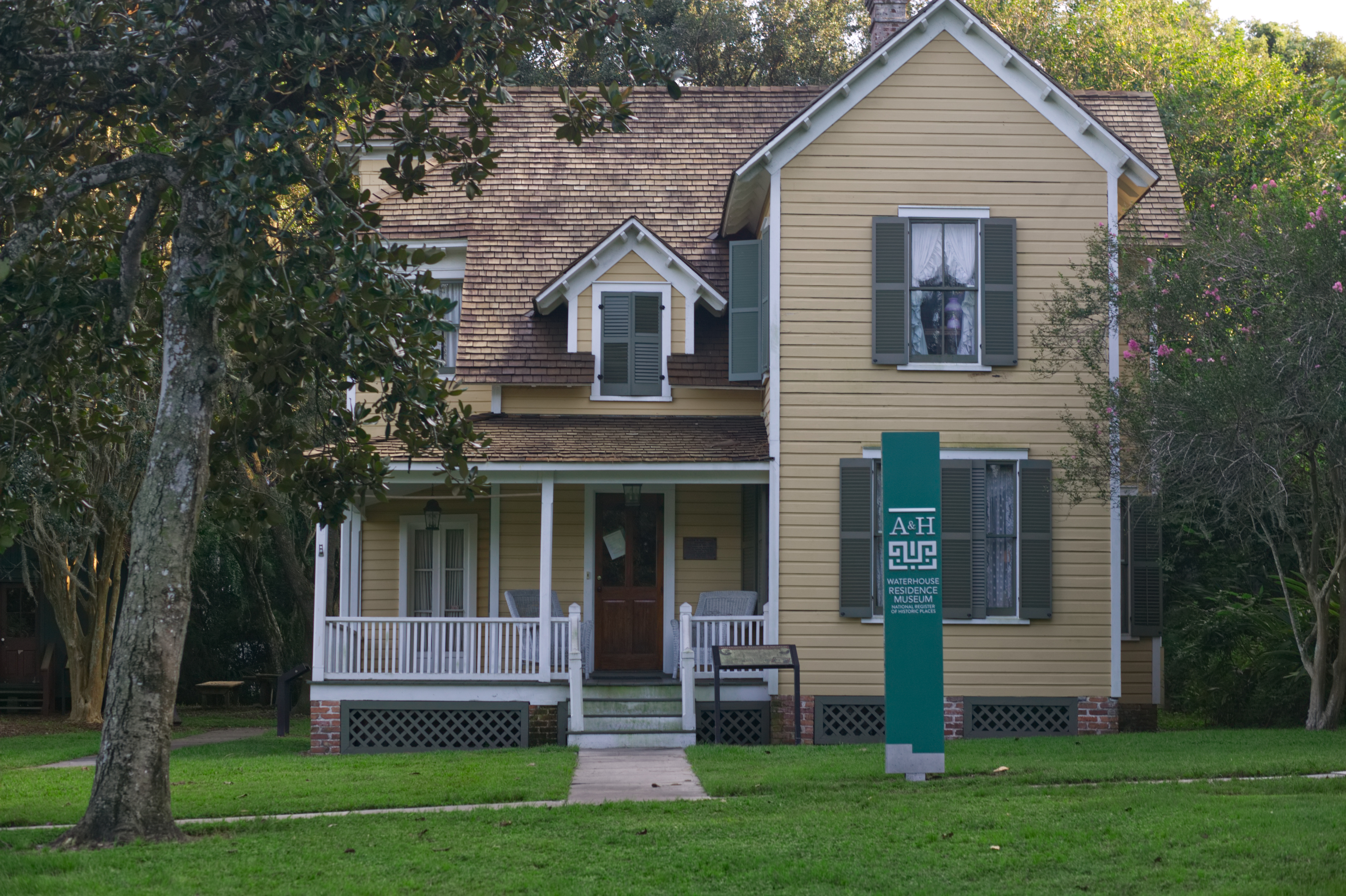
William H. Waterhouse House, September 2018

The home is a 2½ story L-shaped structure located at 820 South Lake Lily Drive, and was originally built in 1884 by carpenter William Waterhouse. Additions to the house were completed in about 1908, 1910, 1930, and the 1950s. It is one of only a few remaining examples of nineteenth century vernacular architecture in Maitland.

The Maitland Historical Society owns the house and operates it as a Victorian era historic house museum known as the Waterhouse Residence Museum. The adjacent 1883 Carpentry Shop Museum features a display of 19th and early 20th century woodworking tools.

The house was added to the National Register of Historic Places February 2, 1983.

== See also ==
- National Register of Historic Places listings in Orange County, Florida
