= Isaac Vanderpool =

Florida homesteader, politician, and citrus baron

Isaac Vanderpool (1850 – May 20, 1917) was a pioneer, citrus businessman and politician in Florida. He served as a councilman and mayor in Maitland, Florida, and was credited with the "scheme" to establish what became Eatonville, Florida, to segregate Maitland's then growing black population and remove those residents from the community. After his plans were realized, Maitland was reported to have no "negro" property owners left.

== Family and early life ==
Vanderpool was born in New York City. His family line was "Holland Dutch". His mother was born in Wolverhampton, England.

== Career ==
After a stint working for a diamond mine in Brazil he came to Florida in 1870 with Henry S. Kedney, with whom he traveled down the St. Johns River. In 1847, Vanderpool established a settlement where Maitland developed with a 160 acre government homestead land grant. He developed orange groves and got into the packing business. His son Fred W. Vanderpool inherited some of the property and got into the insurance business.

Vanderpool settled in the Maitland area of Florida. After returning to New York for about a year he came back to his Florida homestead in 1876. He resided in Maitland for the rest of his life serving two terms as mayor.

Harriet Vanderpool was his wife. She was an organizer of the Florida Audubon Society and they helped establish the Maitland Public Library as well as the Episcopal Church of the Good Shepherd. In 1927, she wrote "Maitland Song", the official song for the city of Maitland. In Vanderpool became mayor of Maitland in 1887 and during this time. His tenure included the acquisition of land for the city's first cemetery. In 1892, he built the first packinghouse in Maitland, which was featured in The Gate City Chronicle as the state's "most modern and best packinghouse." For years he was the largest grove operator and packer in the state, and was prominent in social and business circles.

Grace Norman Tuttle who wrote "Echoes of Miami" columns for the Miami Herald credited Vaderpool and the establishment of Eatonville with solving the "race problem" by establishing a separate town for blacks.

He was photographed and his home by Lake Maitland with his family in front was also photographed.

== Later life and death ==
Vanderpool was one of the three old surviving residents of Orange County forty-two years after moving to the area.

On May 14, 1917, it was reported that Vanderpool was very ill, and a week later it was reported that his eldest son Fred was traveling to attend his funeral.

He was survived by his wife, three sons, and two daughters. Vanderpool's wife died in 1937.
