= Maitland, Florida =

City in Florida, US

- City
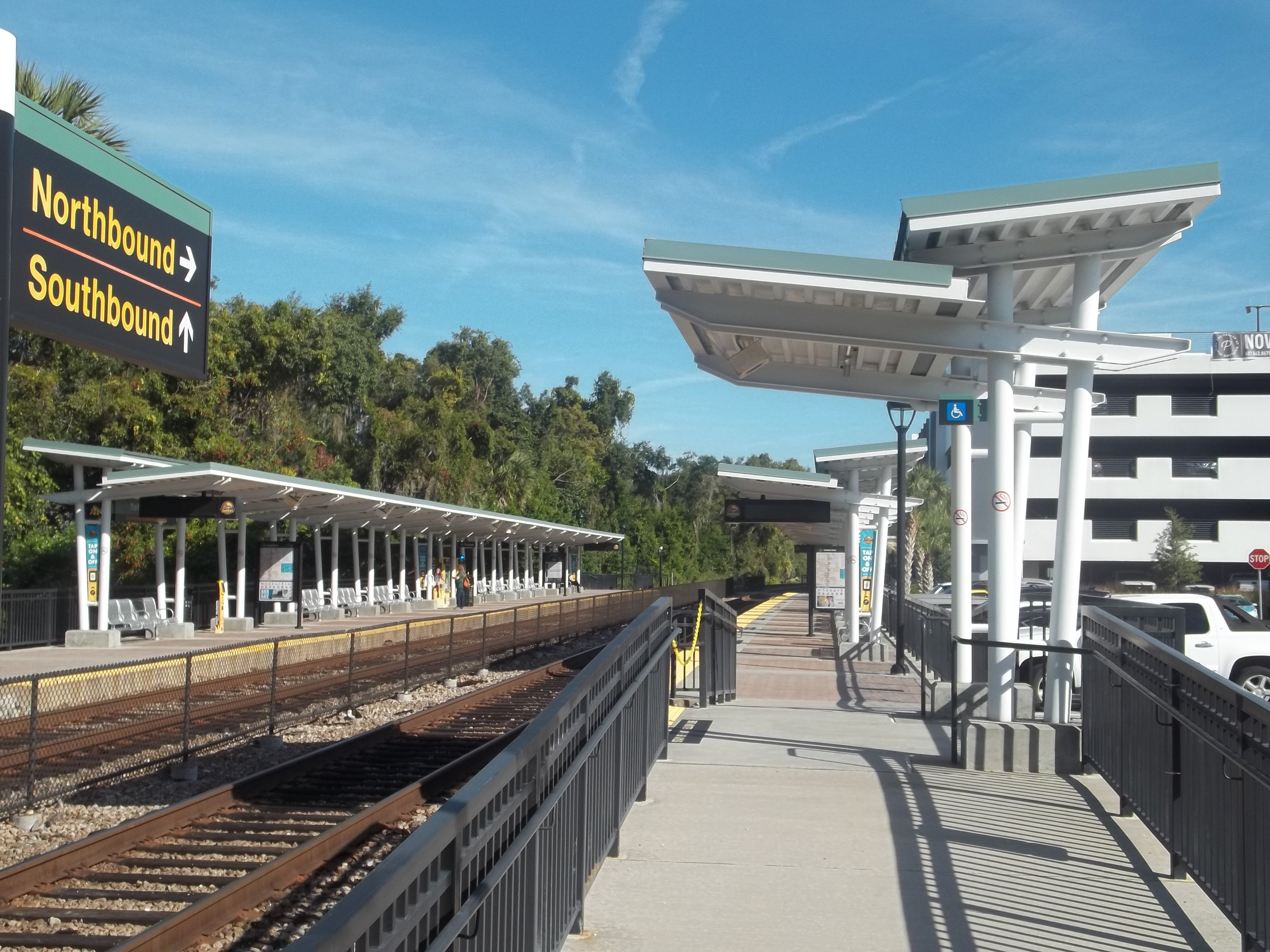
- Maitland station

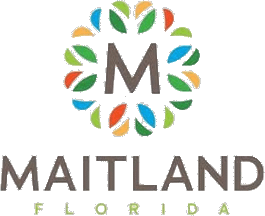
- Logo
- Motto: A Community For Life

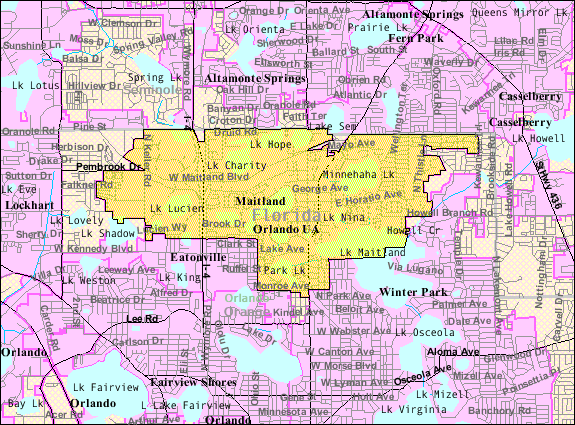
- U.S. Census map
- Coordinates: 28°37′35″N 81°23′01″W
- Country: United States
- State: Florida
- County: Orange
- Incorporated (Town): July 17, 1885
- Incorporated (City): June 1, 1959

Area
  - Total: 6.48 sq mi (16.78 km^{2})
  - Land: 5.36 sq mi (13.88 km^{2})
  - Water: 1.12 sq mi (2.89 km^{2})
- Elevation: 82 ft (25 m)

Population (2020)
  - Total: 19,543
  - Estimate (2021): 18,959
  - Density: 3,646.1/sq mi (1,407.78/km^{2})
- Time zone: UTC-5 (Eastern (EST))
  - Summer (DST): UTC-4 (EDT)
- ZIP codes: 32751, 32794
- Area codes: 407, 689
- FIPS code: 12-42575
- GNIS feature ID: 2405000
- Website: www.itsmymaitland.com

Maitland is a suburban city in Orange County, Florida, United States, part of the Greater Orlando area. The population was 19,543 at the 2020 census. The area's history is exhibited at the Maitland Historical Museum; the city also hosts the Maitland Art Center, as well as notable examples of Mayan Revival architecture and Fantasy architecture, the Maitland Telephone Museum, and the William H. Waterhouse House Museum (all museums and the Maitland Art Center are now managed by Art & History Museums of Maitland). A SunRail station is located in Maitland on Highway 17–92. The city is named for Fort Maitland.

== History ==
Maitland is one of the oldest incorporated suburban municipalities in central Florida. The area was previously inhabited by Timucuan Native Americans. The town was originally named for a nearby Lake, which honored Captain William Seton Maitland, who fought in the Second Seminole Indian War, and was slain in the Battle of Wahoo Swamp. A small military outpost was built in 1838 on the western shore of Lake Fumecheliga (later Lake Maitland) during the Second Seminole War. After the Civil War, new residents arrived in the area. Christopher Columbus Beasley, perhaps the first permanent settler, arrived at Lake Maitland in 1871. A post office opened on January 2 of the next year and operated in his home. Around this post office, a small town grew. In the closing decades of the nineteenth century the area was put into extensive citrus production.

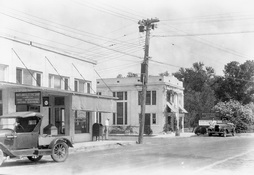
A street corner in Lake Maitland, c. 1926

Lake Maitland was incorporated as a town in 1885, the third such town in Orange County to do so. In its infancy, Lake Maitland was often characterized as a rural village, with streets lined with large oak trees planted by early town aldermen. However, the old town began to rapidly modernize as Orlando's suburban sprawl reached the town in the mid-1920s. During this period the town grew rapidly as new houses and roads were built.

One of the town's pioneers, citrus grower Isaac Vanderpool, became mayor and developed a plan to remove the community's growing black population by helping to organize the separate community that became Eatonville, Florida.

In 1959, Maitland was incorporated as a city. Maitland is a suburb of Orlando. The town's "historical corridor" encompasses old residences still standing and occupied in the Lake Lily-Lake Catherine area and extending through the central portion of the city. Examples of these century-old structures include the Church of the Good Shepherd (1883); the William H. Waterhouse House (1884); the Maitland Public Library (1907); and the Maitland Art Center (1937). The area has always been a vacation spot because of its climate, location to theme parks and people. Maitland has many picturesque parks along lakes, which attract many boaters.

== Geography ==
According to the United States Census Bureau, the city has a total area of 6.4 square miles (16.6 km^{2}), of which 5.3 square miles (13.6 km^{2}) is land and 1.2 square miles (3.0 km^{2}) (17.84%) is water. The city of Maitland has a total of 21 lakes, the largest being Lake Maitland (451 acres).

== Demographics ==
Historical population
Census	Pop.	Note	%±
1900	136		—
1910	157		15.4%
1920	172		9.6%
1930	511		197.1%
1940	463		−9.4%
1950	889		92.0%
1960	3,570		301.6%
1970	7,157		100.5%
1980	8,763		22.4%
1990	9,110		4.0%
2000	12,019		31.9%
2010	15,751		31.1%
2020	19,543		24.1%
2022 (est.)	19,356	▼	−1.0%
U.S. Decennial Census

=== Racial and ethnic composition ===
Maitland racial composition
Race	Pop 2010	Pop 2020	% 2010	% 2020
White	11,595	12,360	73.61%	63.25%
Black or African American	1,657	2,194	10.52%	11.23%
Native American or Alaska Native	17	24	0.11%	0.12%
Asian	538	881	3.42%	4.51%
Pacific Islander or Native Hawaiian	5	4	0.03%	0.02%
Some other race	35	249	0.22%	1.27%
Two or more races/Multiracial	262	771	1.66%	3.95%
Hispanic or Latino (any race)	1,642	3,060	10.42%	15.66%
Total	15,751	19,543		

=== 2020 census ===
As of the 2020 census, Maitland had a population of 19,543. The median age was 36.1 years. 18.7% of residents were under the age of 18 and 14.5% of residents were 65 years of age or older. For every 100 females there were 90.8 males, and for every 100 females age 18 and over there were 87.7 males age 18 and over.

100.0% of residents lived in urban areas, while 0.0% lived in rural areas.

There were 8,984 households in Maitland, of which 24.0% had children under the age of 18 living in them. Of all households, 38.6% were married-couple households, 21.2% were households with a male householder and no spouse or partner present, and 31.5% were households with a female householder and no spouse or partner present. About 36.0% of all households were made up of individuals and 10.2% had someone living alone who was 65 years of age or older.

There were 10,113 housing units, of which 11.2% were vacant. The homeowner vacancy rate was 1.7% and the rental vacancy rate was 14.3%.

Racial composition as of the 2020 census
Race	Number	Percent
White	13,106	67.1%
Black or African American	2,294	11.7%
American Indian and Alaska Native	48	0.2%
Asian	899	4.6%
Native Hawaiian and Other Pacific Islander	12	0.1%
Some other race	1,004	5.1%
Two or more races	2,180	11.2%
Hispanic or Latino (of any race)	3,060	15.7%

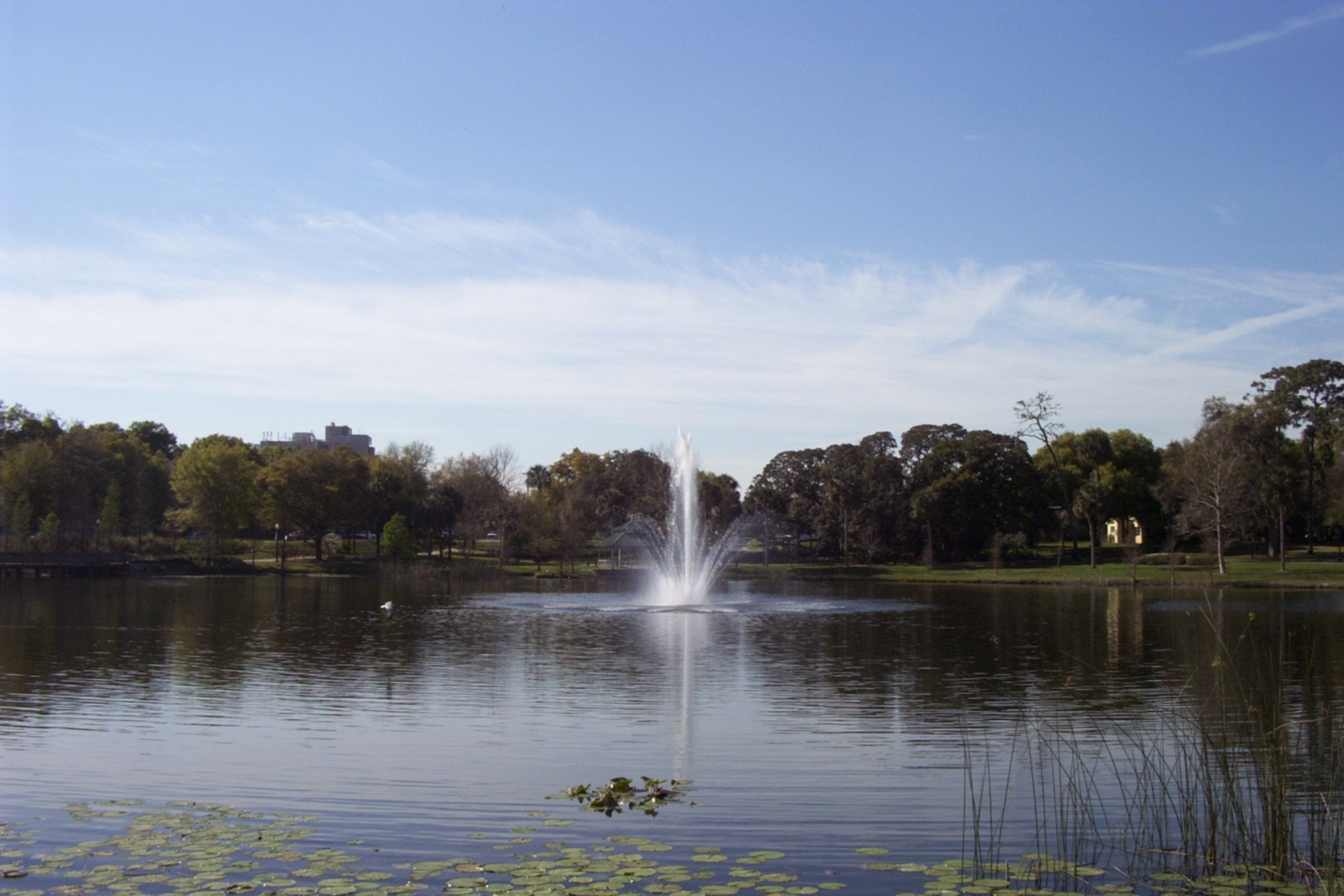
Maitland is peppered with a number of lakes, including Lake Lily pictured here.

=== 2010 census ===
As of the 2010 United States census, there were 15,751 people, 6,274 households, and 3,818 families residing in the city.

== Economy ==
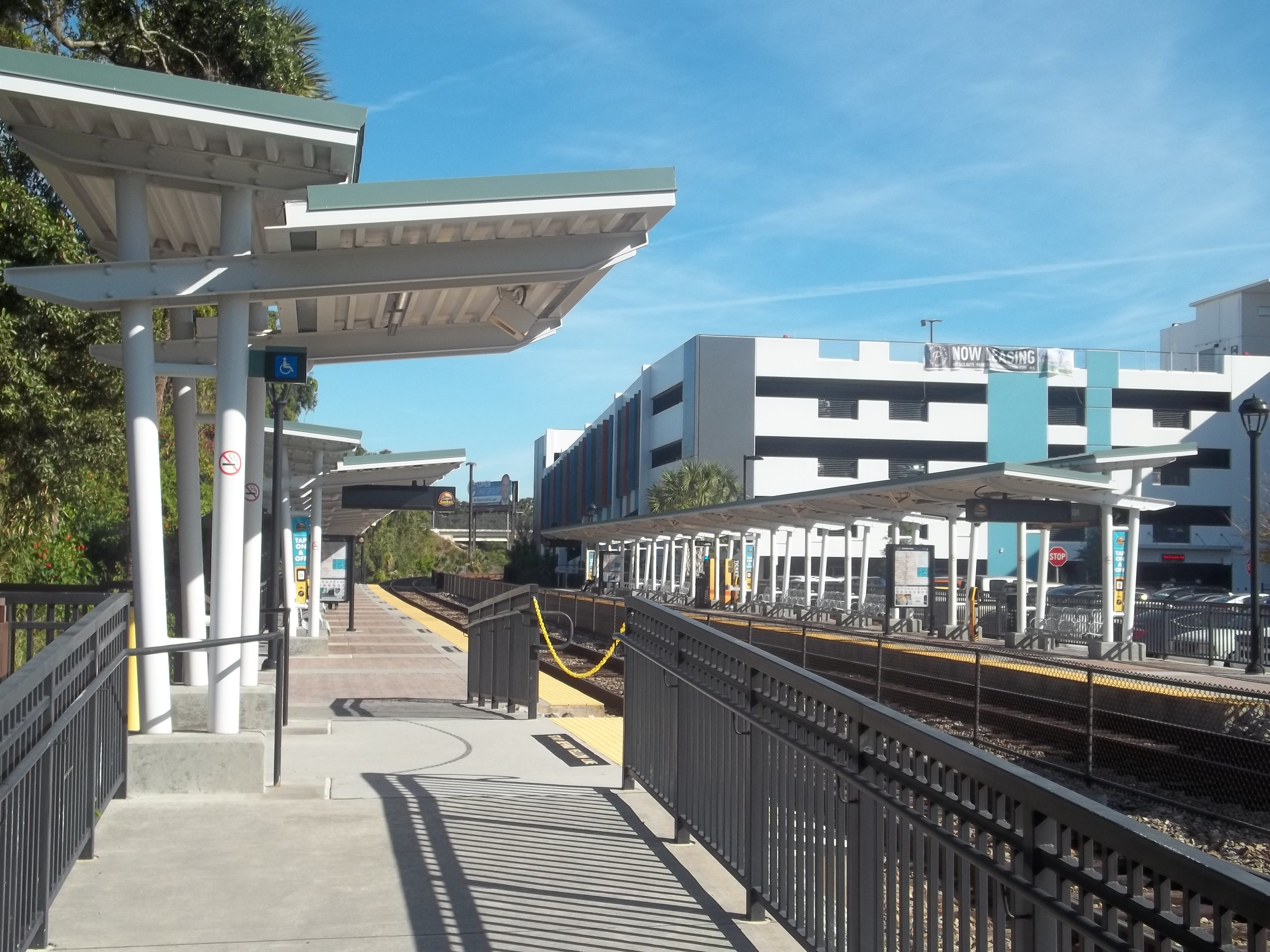
Maitland SunRail station

The Maitland Center was established in 1982 adjacent to Interstate 4. Today its 226 acres (91 ha) include over 400 businesses and over 45 office buildings.

Worldwide Brands has its headquarters in Maitland.

Other local employers include:

- Sonny's Real Pit Bar-B-Q
- Fidelity Integrated Financial Solutions
- Charles Schwab Corporation
- The Timothy Plan, a Christian-oriented investing firm.

SunRail, the regional commuter rail service, operates a passenger rail station in Maitland. The first 31-mile (50 km) segment of the system (between DeBary and Sand Lake Road in Orange County) began operations on May 1, 2014.

== Culture and recreation ==
Maitland is home to the nationally recognized and Central Florida's only full-time independent movie theater, Enzian Theater, in turn home to the Florida Film Festival. Maitland is also home to the Art & History Museums – Maitland, including the Maitland Art Center (formerly the Research Studio, 1937), which is a designated a National Historic Landmark (2014) for its unique Mayan Revival and Fantasy architecture; the Maitland Historical Museum; the Maitland Telephone Museum; the William H. Waterhouse House Museum, also listed on the National Register of Historic Places; and the Carpentry Shop Museum. Maitland is also home to The Roth Family Jewish Community Center of Greater Orlando, which serves as the center of Jewish life in Orlando and welcomes people of all backgrounds.

In August 2005 the Maitland Little League team made it to the semifinals of the 2005 Little League World Series.

== Education ==
Orange County Public Schools operates public schools in Maitland.

- Dommerich Elementary School
- Lake Sybelia Elementary School
- Maitland Middle School

Private schools include:

- Maitland Montessori School
- Jewish Academy of Orlando
- Orangewood Christian School
- Park Maitland School
- King of Kings Lutheran School (K3–8)

Institutions of higher education include:

- Everglades University
- University of Phoenix-Orlando

== Museums and libraries ==
- Maitland Historical Museum
- Telephone Museum
- Waterhouse Carpentry Museum

=== Maitland Public Library ===
The city of Maitland has its own library, independent of the Orange County Library System. The Maitland Public Library is a non-profit organization that originated in 1896, with a donation of 360 books housed in the home of a local teacher. As the collection grew, it moved to a small local storefront open once a week. In 1907, residents worked to develop plans and gather funds to construct a designated library building. Less than a year later in 1908, the Maitland Public Library was officially opened.

Multiple additions have been made to the building, but the Maitland Public Library has continued to operate from the same location for over 100 years. However, the library is currently preparing to move to a new, larger building, garnering support through the Maitland Public Library Project. In 2024, Maitland voters approved a $14 million dollar plan to build the updated, 20,000 square foot library facility. The current building is 12,300 square feet. Designed by HBM Architects in Cleveland, Ohio, the new building is expected to open in the second half of 2027.

Today, the library has over 96,000 items in its collections. It offers Maitland residents a variety of items for check-out, including a large selection of e-books and audiobooks. Special collections include an Audubon Collection, and Library of Things. The library also offers free classes and events.

The Maitland Public Library is run by a director and a board of trustees. The current director is Stacie A. Larson.

== Points of interest ==
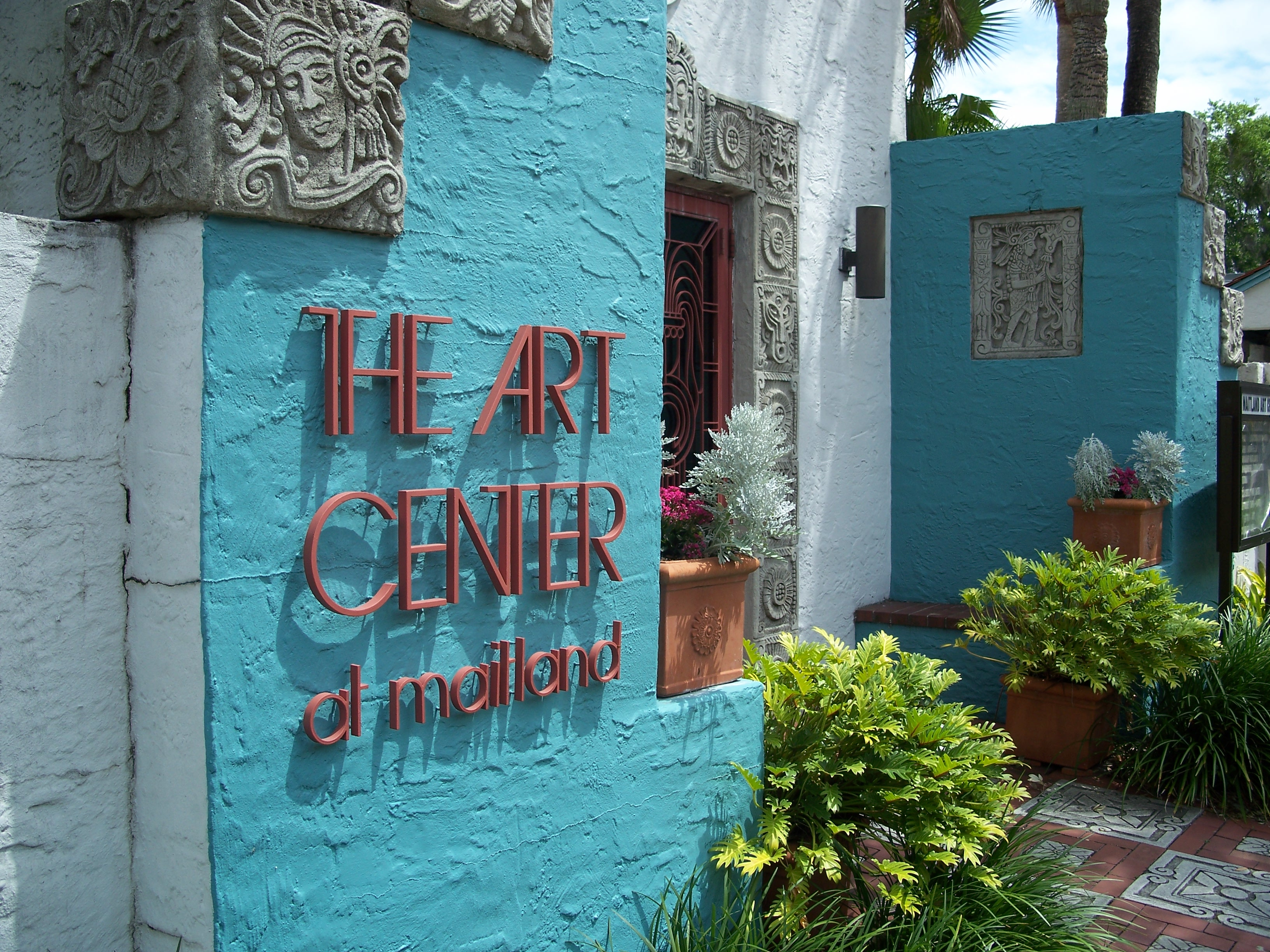
Maitland Art Center

- Maitland Art Center
- Enzian Theater
- Lake Maitland
- William H. Waterhouse House
- Jewish Community Center of Greater Orlando
- Holocaust Memorial Resource and Education Center of Florida
- Audubon Center for Birds of Prey
- Howell Branch Nature Preserve and Park
- Lake Lily – Location for the Maitland Art Festival
- Lake Minnehaha
- Lake Sybelia
- Maitland Community Park
- Maitland Farmer's Market
- Quinn Strong Park

== Notable people ==
- Dante Bichette, former MLB player
- Chip Caray, TBS's lead play-by-play announcer for the Atlanta Braves
- Prichard Colón, MMA fighter (died in 2026)
- McKinley Crone, soccer player
- Jazzy Danziger, winner of the Brittingham Prize in Poetry
- Jan Fortune, former state representative
- Buddy Morrow, leader of the Tommy Dorsey Orchestra
- John M. Pierce, writer on and promoter of amateur telescope making
- J. Andre Smith, artist and architect; founder of the Research Studio (now known as the Maitland Art Center)
- Mike Stanley, former MLB player
