= Jan Fortune =

American politician (born 1926)

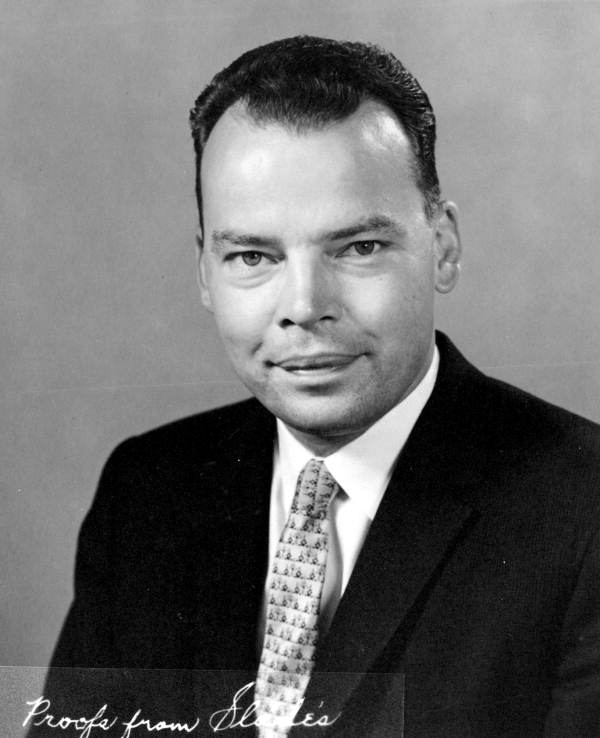

Member of the Florida House of Representatives from the Seminole County district
- In office 1967–1968
- In office 1963–1965

Personal details
- Born: November 24, 1926 Pottsville, Pennsylvania, U.S.
- Party: Republican
- Spouse: Donna Martin
- Education: Pennsylvania State University (BS); University of Pennsylvania (MBA)

Military service
- Branch/service: United States Army
- Battles/wars: World War II; Korean War

Jan Fortune (born November 24, 1926) was an American politician and engineer in the American state of Florida.

== Biography ==
Fortune was born in 1926 in Pennsylvania to Robert J. and Blanch (Rauch) Fortune, of Scottish and Dutch ancestry. He earned a Bachelor of Science degree in industrial management from Pennsylvania State University and a Master of Business Administration from the Wharton School of the University of Pennsylvania.

Fortune worked for the Westinghouse Air Brake Company in Pennsylvania, Curtiss-Wright in New jersey, A. T. Kearney and Company in Chicago, and the Glenn L. Martin Company in Florida.

He served in the Florida House of Representatives for Seminole County from 1963 to 1965 and 1967 to 1968.

== Personal life ==
Fortune married Donna Martin Lee of Norwood, New York, in 1953. They have one son and one daughter, Jan Eric and Jan Marie. Fortune served in the United States Army Signal Corps as a lieutenant during the Korean War and with the United States Maritime Service in World War II. He is Protestant.
