= Total oxyradical scavenging capacity =

Method of quantifying antioxidant capacity

A total oxyradical scavenging capacity (TOSC) assay is a method of quantifying antioxidant capacity in the context of molecular biology and toxicology, as an indication of oxidative stress. The assay measures ethylene (ethene).

The invention of this assay was first made public during 1998.

== See also ==
- Oxygen radical absorbance capacity (ORAC)
