= Maitland Art Center =

- U.S. National Register of Historic Places
- U.S. National Historic Landmark District
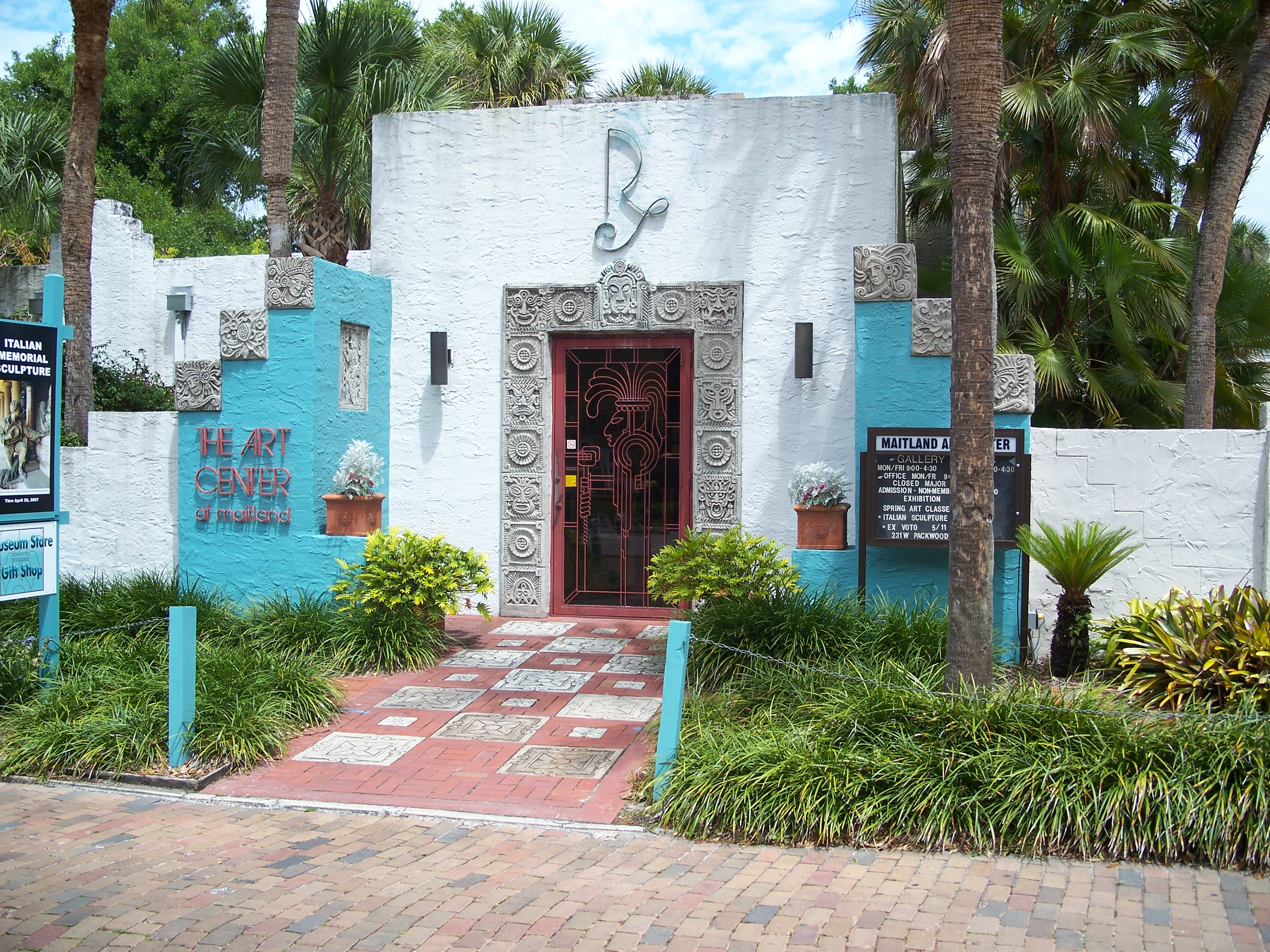

- Location within Florida Location within the United States
- Location: Maitland, Florida
- Coordinates: 28°37′32″N 81°22′3″W
- Built: 1937
- Architect: Jules Andre Smith
- Architectural style: Mayan Revival
- NRHP reference No.: 82001036; 14000920 (NHL)

Significant dates
- Added to NRHP: November 17, 1982
- Designated NHLD: August 25, 2014

The Maitland Art Center (formerly known as The Research Studio) is a historic site in Maitland, Florida. It was founded and designed by architect and artist J. Andre Smith (1880–1959) in 1937 as an artist colony, dedicated to experimental art. Funded by philanthropist Mary Curtis Bok, the colony hosted artists such as Ralston Crawford, Milton Avery, and Consuelo Kanaga. It is located at 231 West Packwood Avenue. On November 17, 1982, it was added to the U.S. National Register of Historic Places.

The Maitland Art Center is one of the five museums encompassed by the Art & History Museums – Maitland (A&H). The A&H's Maitland Art Center offers artist residency programs, a variety of art classes for adults and children, professional development for artists, and dynamic programming for art appreciation. The A&H is a non-profit organization funded by earned income and contributions by the City of Maitland, the State of Florida, United Arts of Central Florida, grants, and individual donations.

The A&H's Maitland Art Center is one of the few examples of Mayan Revival architecture, also known as Fantasy Architecture in the southeast. The grounds are a common location for outdoor weddings. The art center offers three areas for weddings: the Main Garden, the Chapel, and the Mayan Courtyard.

The Center (as The Research Studio (Maitland Art Center)) was designated a National Historic Landmark in August 2014. It was given this designation primarily for its distinctive architecture, a Mayan-influenced interpretation of Art Deco, sometimes referred to as Mayan Revival.

== See also ==
- List of National Historic Landmarks in Florida
- National Register of Historic Places listings in Orange County, Florida
