= J. Andre Smith =

American architect and artist

Jules Andre Smith (1880–1959) was a war artist for the United States Army during World War I. He was born in Hong Kong, lived a few years in Hamburg, Germany as a child after his father died, and moved with his mother and family to New York City. He attended schools and college in New York State, getting an undergraduate and graduate degree in architecture from Cornell University. He eventually became a well-renowned artist, known for his etching and printmaking. His time as a war artist developed his skills, and he would continue his artistic lifestyle throughout his life. He eventually retired to Florida, where he established his Research Studio, now the Art and History Museums Maitland, which is now designated as a National Historic Landmark.

== Biography ==
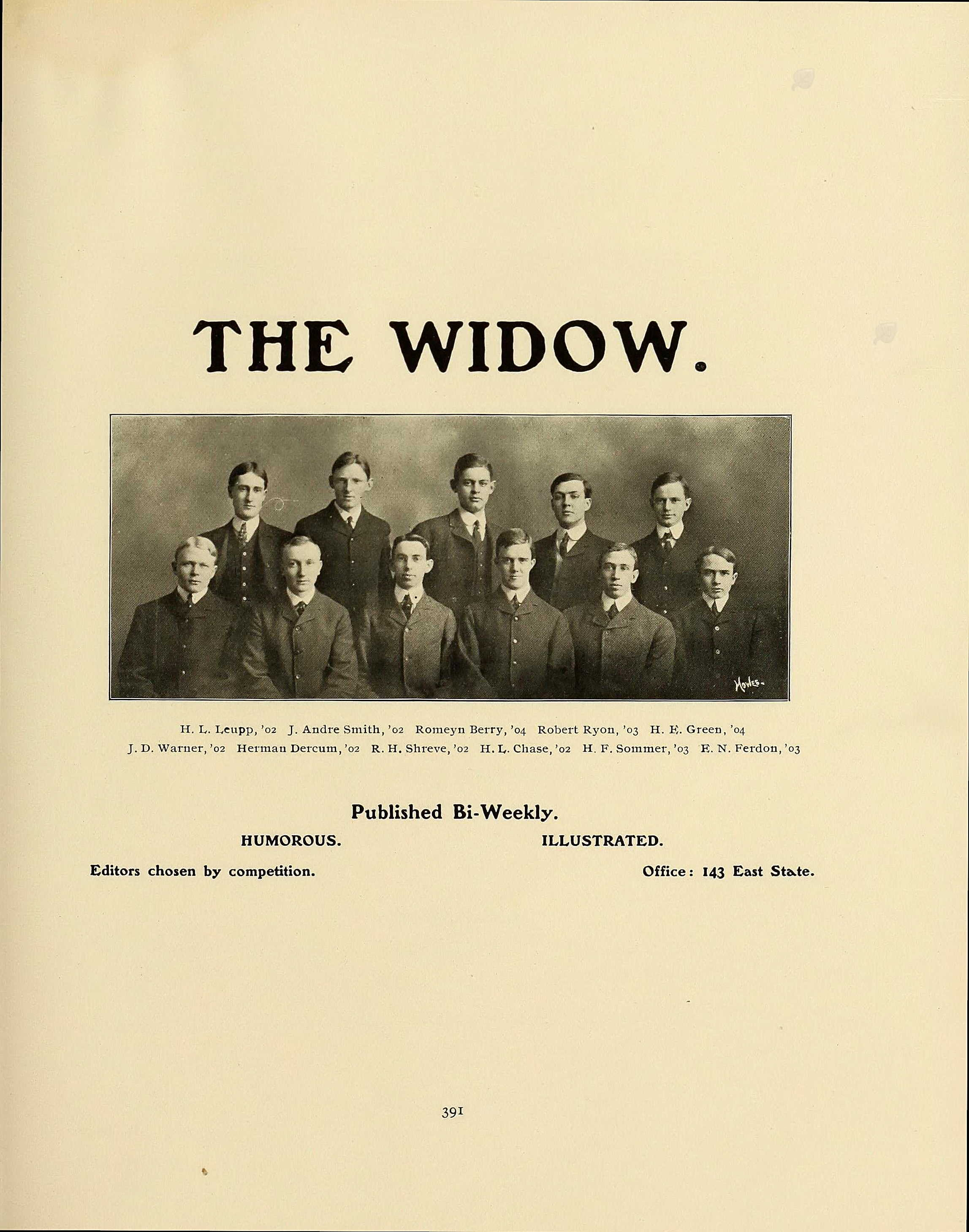
Group photo of those who worked on The Cornell Widow, a humorous student-run magazine that ran from 1894 to 1962. (Top row, second from the left.)

Jules Andre Smith, was born to American parents in Hong Kong in 1880, when the city was under British colonial rule. According to Smith, his father was a shipbuilder who was lost at sea, after which his mother relocated the family first to Hamburg, Germany; then to New York City in 1889; and finally to the small town of Stony Creek, outside New Haven along the Connecticut coast, where they settled. However, passenger lists indicate the family may have immigrated together with Smith's father, John Henry Smith, although there are no records of the family living together in the United States.

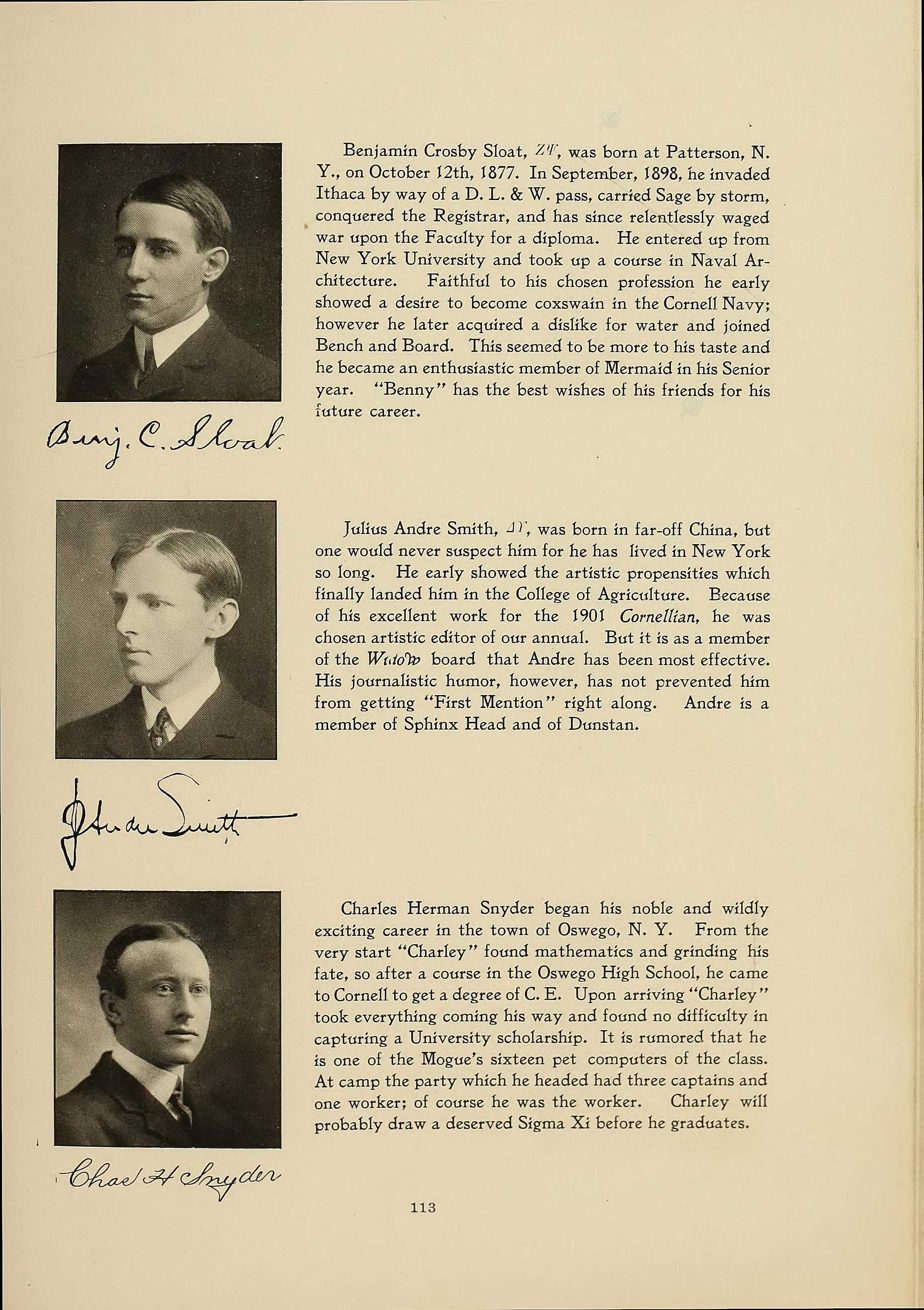
A yearbook biography section from the 1902 edition from Cornell University which includes a biography of Jules Andre Smith.

Smith attended Columbia Grammar School, where he first showed an aptitude for art. However, in deference to his mother's misgivings regarding a career as an artist, it was architecture that he studied when he entered Cornell University in 1898. He received a degree in architecture in 1902, and earned a Master of Science degree in the subject in 1904. He spent two years studying architecture in Europe on a Traveling Fellowship from Cornell. Upon his return from Europe, Smith worked for an architectural firm in New York City. He pursued etching and drawing in his spare time, soon attracting a critical and commercial following. He developed the ability to work quickly and preferred to finish a piece in one sitting. He gave up his career in architecture for art in 1911, and traveled Europe etching landscapes. These works are a wonderful reflection of the artistic spike pre-World War I, and as his artistic skills developed, his works slowly took a radical, experimental turn. In 1915, Smith was awarded the gold medal in etching at the Panama–Pacific International Exhibition in San Francisco. His freelance career had ended by the time the United States entered into World War I.

In 1917, upon America's entry into the war, Smith enlisted in the Army Reserve, where he was given officer training and became a first lieutenant in the Engineer Reserve Corps. He was soon promoted to captain and called to active duty as an artist assigned to the American Camouflage Corps, 40th Engineers, under the command of Aymar Embury, the celebrated New York architect, who organized a unit of eight professional artists to document the activities of the American Expeditionary Force in France, the same unit in which fellow architect-artist Louis Conrad Rosenberg served. Since he was the only one of the artists with any military training, Smith was designated the senior officer of the group. Over the next year he drew upon his architectural training to produce detailed pictures of buildings and places affected by the war, what he called "disquieting and somber images of the war." (He produced more pieces of art during the war than any of his fellow official artists.) Additionally, he designed the Distinguished Service Cross.

=== Post-war career ===
Upon his demobilization following The Armistice, Smith returned to the United States. His wartime experiences served as the basis of In France with the American Expeditionary Forces, a collection of 100 of his field sketches and drawings. The book was published by Arthur H. Halo & Company in 1919, and showed, in Smith's words, ". . . War, the business man, instead of War, the warrior". In it he depicted both the routine of military logistics, as in a study of the harbor at Nantes (#4), and places of " . . . depressing solitude and desolation", as in the view of the ruined town of Bellicourt (#80). His drawings, much like Matthew Brady's panoramas of the American Civil War, strip war of its martial glory and savage allure, and show instead the awful, ordinary banality of war. This was the first of the three books Smith would author, and its sombre tone and disillusioned sensibility prefigures many of the changes and attitudes that characterized his later work.

Smith remained in New York practicing architecture and continuing to make fine art drawings and prints until 1924, when he returned to his Stony Creek, Connecticut home. This may have been due to the amputation of Smith's right leg that year, which had been injured on barbed wire while he was in Plattsburg for officer training. The wound never completely healed, leading to a life of constant pain and disability that affected his activities for the rest of his life. He became involved with a local theater group, designing sets, murals, and stage layouts. This would lead to the publication of his second book "The Scenewright: the making of stage models and settings", published by The Macmillan Company in 1926, which went through multiple editions in the 1920s and 1930s, and which for many years served as a primary reference for the craft of set design. His printmaking continued to attract critical attention, and he coupled his continued success as a fine artist with a series of articles that appeared in periodicals and journals. It was during this period that the expositional Beaux Arts treatment that characterized his pre-war prints gradually became more stylized and expressive.

In 1930, owing to health concerns and the severity of the New England winters, Smith and his studio assistant Attilio J. Banca traveled to Florida in search of a site for a winter studio. The two men drove down the Eastern Seaboard intending to acquire property in South Florida on which they would build a residential studio. Along the way they passed through the small town of Lake Maitland, and paused there long enough to be favorably impressed by its surroundings and nearby lake. This trip, however, proved fruitless, as they did not find a suitable location for their project. In 1931, the two men returned to Florida, once again in search of a winter studio. This time they stopped in Winter Park, Florida, where they rented a house for the season. Through a series of fortuitous meetings and introductions Smith met Mrs. Mary Louise Curtis Bok, a Philadelphia plilanthropist, and it was she who provided the financing to buy six acres of land in Lake Maitland, as well as begin the first stages of construction that would result in The Research Center, Smith's visionary artist colony. This project, begun in 1937, today known as the Maitland Art Center and part of the Art & History Museums - Maitland (A&H). In 2014, the site was distinguished as a National Historic Landmark.

By 1935, Smith's eyesight deteriorated to the point where he was unable to continue the close, detailed work necessary for etching. In 1936, he published the third of his three books Art of the Subconscious. This book, which consists of text, 37 drawings, and related poems depicts a disorderly world of exaggerated conflict, contrast, and surrealist juxtapositions, and owes much to the wordless novels of Frans Masereel (1889–1972) and Lynd Ward (1905–1985), whose work Smith may well have seen, and whose disillusioned view of militarized, industrial society he certainly shared.

In retirement in Florida, Smith established the Maitland Research Studio in 1937 in the town of that name, which he designed the building for. He used the center for an art colony, giving classes and holding exhibits there. It has been adapted by the city as the public Maitland Art Center. One of the few examples of “Mayan Revival” or fantasy architecture in the Southeast, it is a National Historic Landmark and recognized by the state of Florida as a historic site.

Jules Andre Smith died at his studio at the Research Studio in 1959 and was buried in his family's plot at the Branford Center Cemetery near his Connecticut home. Inexplicably, Smith's work is held by a few museums. Despite the success, he enjoyed as a printmaker both before and after World War I, he didn't fully exploit it. His print editions were small, and he had no long-term dealer relationships, hence a small collector base. He frequently gave his art away to friends as gifts. Today, the largest and most significant archive of his personal papers, correspondence, and estate artwork is held by the Art and History Museums Maitland.

== Legacy and honors ==
- His Mayan revival-style Maitland Studio has been listed on the National Register of Historic Places and adapted as a community art center. In 2014, it was designated a National Historic Landmark.
