= Florida Institute of Technology =

Private university in Melbourne, Florida, US

- Former name: Brevard Engineering College (1958–1966)
- Motto: Ad Astra Per Scientiam (Latin)
- Motto in English: "To the stars through science"
- Type: Private research university
- Established: September 22, 1958; 68 years ago
- Accreditation: SACS
- Academic affiliations: AITU; ICUF; ORAU; Space-grant
- Endowment: $112.6 million (2025)
- President: John Nicklow
- Provost: John Z. Kiss
- Faculty: 433
- Undergraduates: 4,152
- Postgraduates: 5,711
- Location: Melbourne, Florida, United States; 28°03′57″N 80°37′28″W
- Campus: 174 acres (70 ha); Small city
- Newspaper: The Crimson
- Colors: Red and silver
- Nickname: Panthers
- Sporting affiliations: NCAA Division II - Sunshine State; GSC
- Mascot: Pete the Panther
- Website: fit.edu
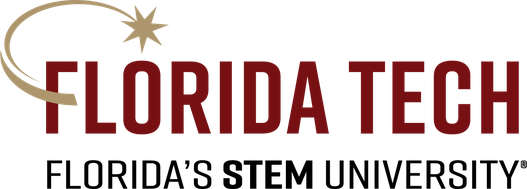

Florida Institute of Technology (Florida Tech or FIT) is a private research university in Melbourne, Florida, United States.

The university comprises four academic colleges: Engineering & Science, Aeronautics, Psychology & Liberal Arts, and Business. Approximately half of Florida Tech's students are enrolled in the College of Engineering & Science. The university's 130 acres (53 ha) primary residential campus is near the Melbourne Orlando International Airport and 16 miles from Patrick Space Force Base.

The university was founded in 1958 as Brevard Engineering College to provide advanced education for professionals working in the U.S. space program at the Kennedy Space Center and Space Launch Delta 45 at Cape Canaveral Space Force Station. Florida Tech has been known by its present name since 1966. In 2024, Florida Tech had an on-campus student body of 5,101 between its Melbourne Campus and Off-Campus Sites, as well as 4,762 students enrolled in their online programs, almost equally divided between graduate and undergraduate students with the majority focusing their studies on engineering and the sciences. Florida Tech is classified among "R2: Doctoral Universities – High research activity".

== History ==
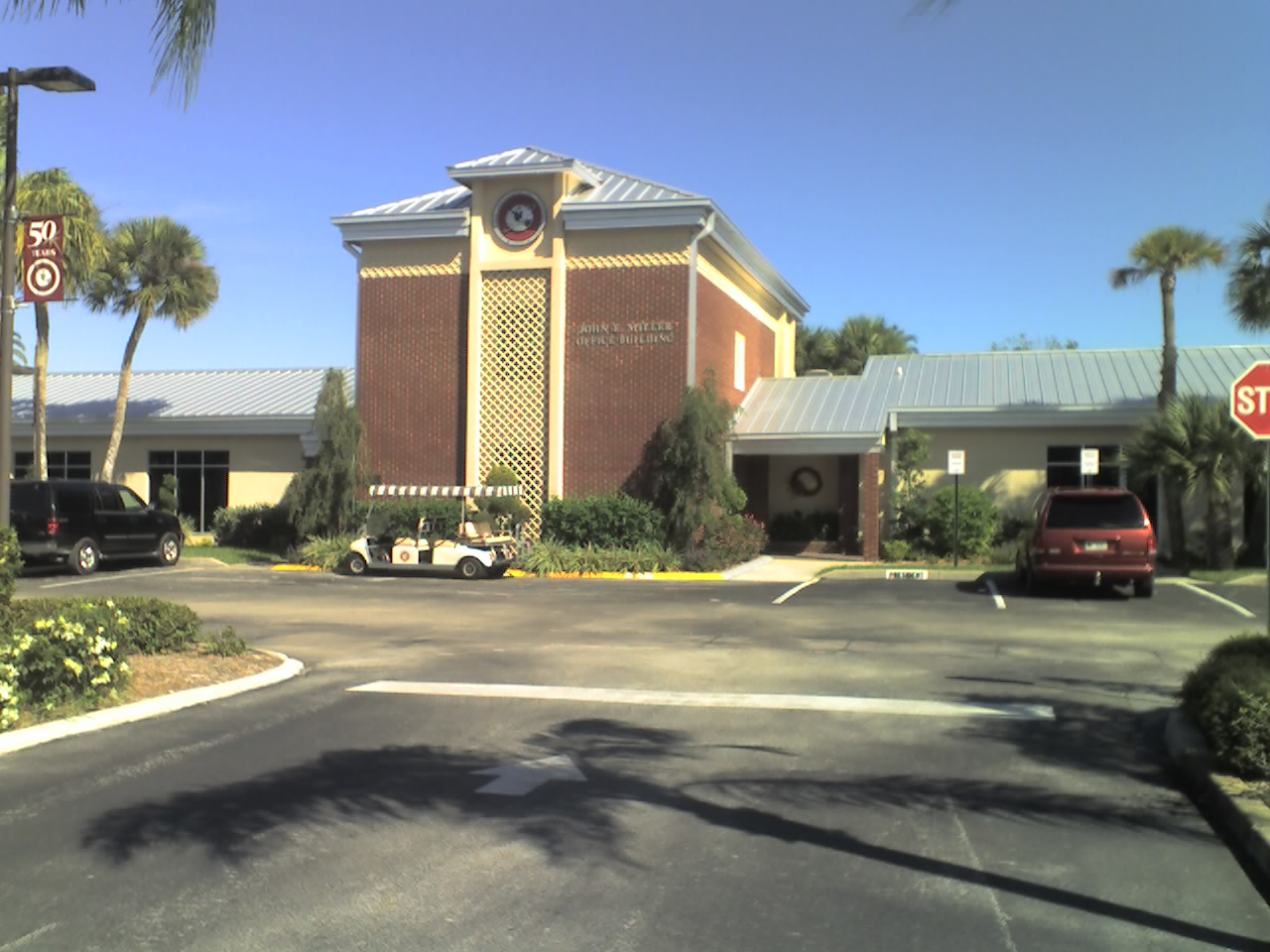
Miller Building

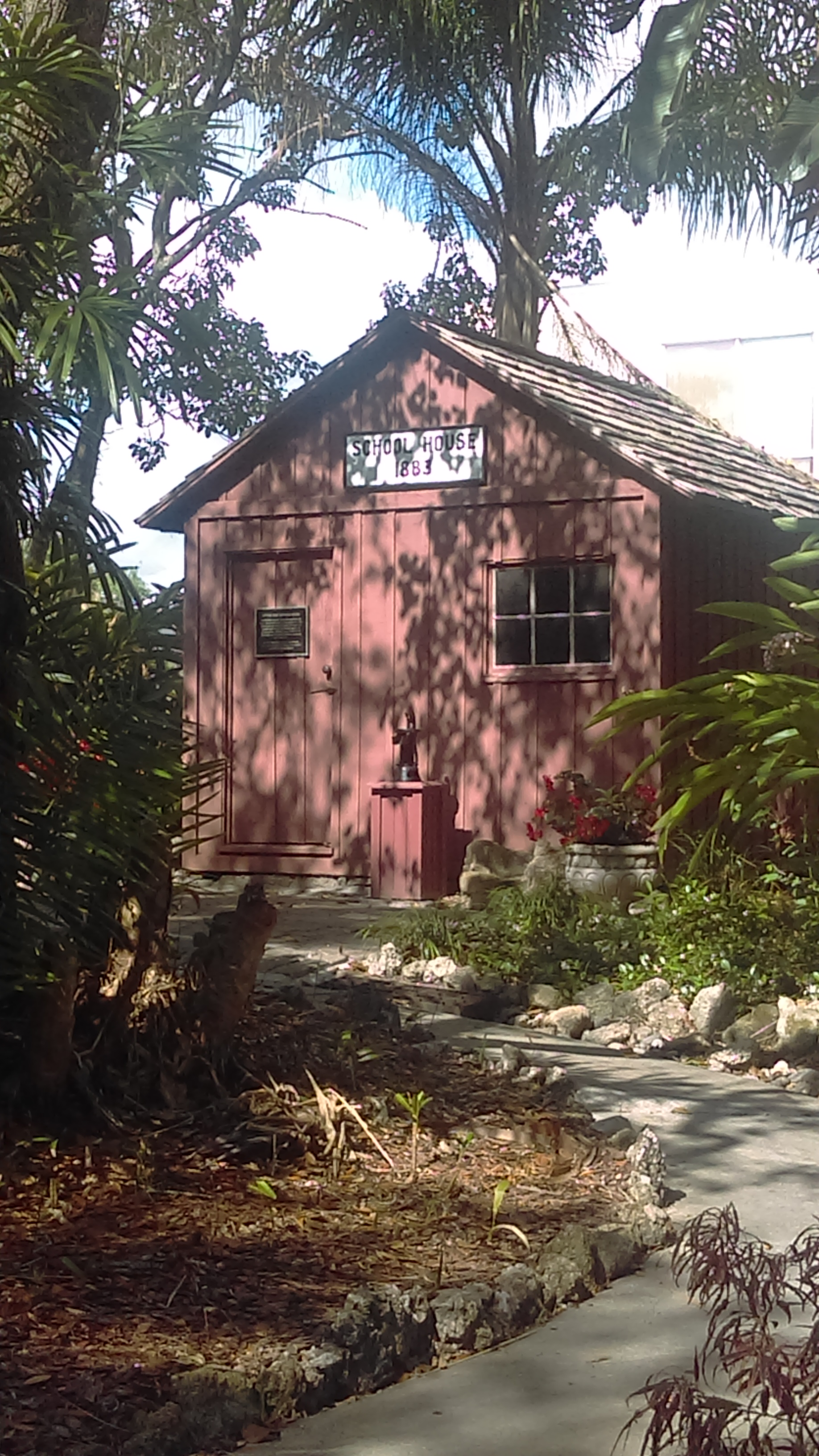
One of the oldest buildings on campus: a schoolhouse built in 1883.

Florida Institute of Technology was founded in 1958 as Brevard Engineering College to support NASA by Dr. Jerome P. Keuper, who became the first president. The first concept for the school was developed under the name Brevard Engineering Institute. Classes were originally held at the Melbourne Municipal Airport in buildings formerly used by the Naval Air Station Melbourne. In 1961, the university moved to its current location in Melbourne, Florida. During the 1960s additional classroom and laboratory buildings, a library (formally dedicated on 23 January 1965), the Denius Student Center, Hedgecock Gymnasium, Gleason Auditorium and several dormitories were constructed. In 1961, the first graduate received an associate degree. The university was accredited by the Southern Association of Colleges and Schools in 1964 and officially changed its name to Florida Institute of Technology in 1966. Also in 1966, Dr. Jack Morelock founded the Department of Oceanography. In 1967, the School of Aeronautics was created. Defense scientists and NASA would meet with students recruiting for the space program. In 1969, the Panther Battalion Army ROTC program was formed. In 1970, the college merged with Aerospace Technical Institute to form the School of Aeronautics.

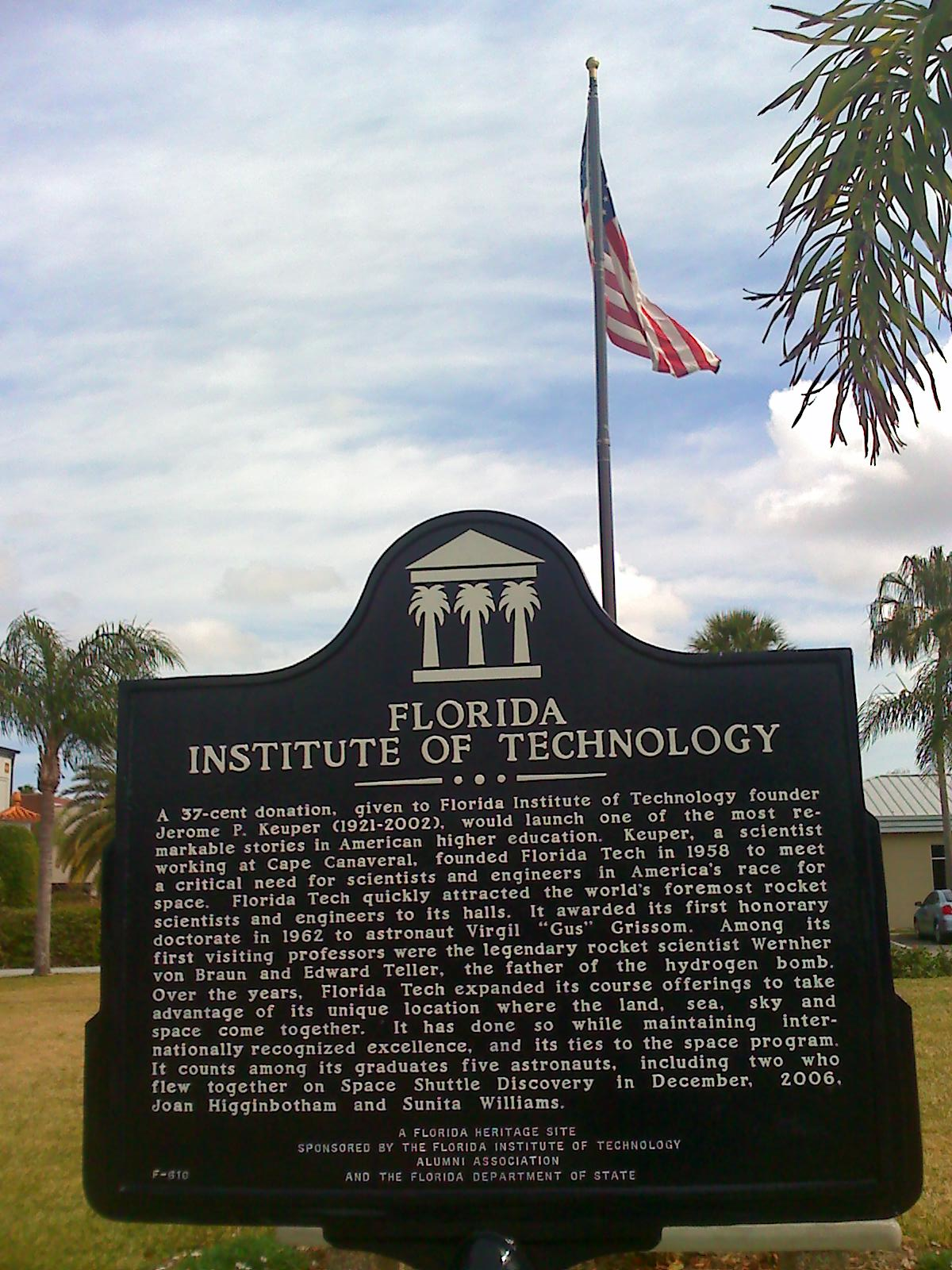
Historic sign from Florida Tech Alumni Association and Florida Department of State.

In 1972, the university launched its first off-campus program at the request of the United States Navy.

The Evans Library was completed in early 1984. The following year the original library was renovated and dedicated as the Jerome P. Keuper Administration Building. In 1988, the Homer R. Denius Student Center was renovated, the student plaza completed, and the applied research laboratory building acquired. The Claude Pepper Institute for Aging and Therapeutic Research and Skurla Hall, home of the School of Aeronautics, opened in 1990. In 1997, the university received a $50 million grant from the F. W. Olin Foundation. An engineering building and life sciences building were opened in 1999 in result of the grant.

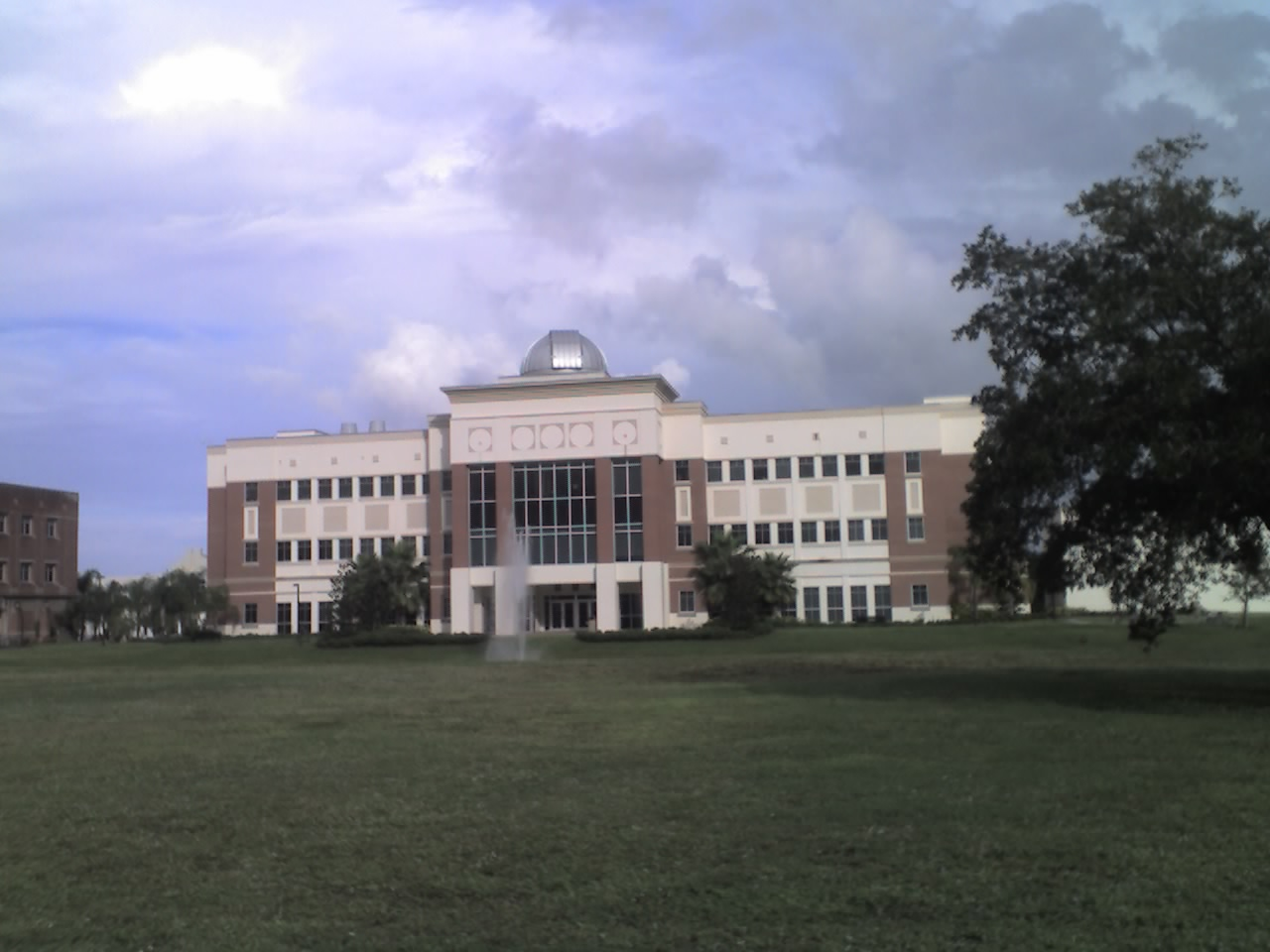
Olin Physical Sciences building home to the Aerospace, Physics, and Space Sciences Department. The building includes the Ortega Observatory & Telescope

Seven new residence halls were completed in 2003. Each residence hall was named after one of the seven fallen astronauts of the Shuttle Columbia disaster and dedicated to their memory. In 2004, Florida Tech obtained National Science Foundation (NSF) funding to build a 24-inch telescope atop the newly completed F.W. Olin Physical Sciences Center. However, Melbourne Beach resident Jim Ortega, who had retired from the University of Virginia to Florida in 1998, stepped forward with the additional funds needed to secure a 32-inch telescope and its associated observatory. In gratitude for this donation, the telescope was named the Ortega Telescope as part of the Ortega Observatory. In 2005, the F.W. Olin Physical Sciences Center opened.

Construction on the Emil Buehler Center for Aviation Training and Research at Melbourne International Airport began in 2008. The following year, the College of Business became the Nathan M. Bisk College of Business, and the Ruth Funk Center for Textile Arts, the Emil Buehler Center for Aviation Training and Research at the Melbourne International Airport, the Scott Center for Autism Treatment, the Harris Center for Science and Engineering and the Harris Institute for Information Assurance were opened.

In 2009, the college began offering online degrees. November 20, 2015, marked the unveiling of the Harris Student Design Center, an 11,500 square foot building on the south side of campus. This facility provides space for students completing design projects. In 2016, the Center for Advanced Manufacturing and Innovative Design (CAMID) and the Larsen Motorsports High Performance Vehicles & Research Development Center opened at the Research and Development Center on Palm Bay Road.

The university established its football program in 2010. The Panther Aquatic Center was opened a year later. In 2011, the university partnered with the Brevard Art Museum and established it as the Foosaner Art Museum.

In October 2020, the university broke ground at the Olin Quad for the new Health Sciences Research Center, a 61,000 square foot three-story facility with 22,300 square feet for classrooms, training and labs.

On April 24, 2026, the university became one of 16 other schools to host a US Coast Guard Auxiliary University Program unit which acts similarly to an ROTC program.

=== College archives ===
The Harry P. Weber University Archives opened in 2014. It was named after professor emeritus Harry Weber, who first joined the college in 1966 and was instrumental in establishing the archives. The archive collection serves to preserve the history of the institution and it is located in the Evans Library.

=== Jensen Beach Campus ===
Florida Institute of Technology's Jensen Beach Campus, also known as School of Marine and Environmental Technology (SOMET), was a specialized branch campus located on the former campus of Saint Joseph College of Florida on the Indian River Lagoon in Jensen Beach, Florida, approximately 50 miles south of the university's main campus. The campus attracted oceanography, underwater technology and other assorted marine biology students. The National Oceanic and Atmospheric Administration had more officers that are graduates of Florida Tech in Jensen Beach than from any other campus or college in the country. The SOMET was transferred to the main campus and became the Department of Marine and Environmental Sciences (DMES). The campus closed after the transition in 1986. In 2016, DMES was renamed Department of Ocean Engineering and Sciences (DOES) to communicate the department's focus.

=== Presidents ===
Presidents of the institution have included:

- John Nicklow, 2023–present
- Robert King (Interim), 2022–2023
- T. Dwayne McCay, 2016–2022
- Anthony J. Catanese, 2002–2016
- Lynn E. Weaver, 1987–2002
- John E. Miller, 1986–1987
- Jerome P. Keuper, 1958–1986

== Campus ==
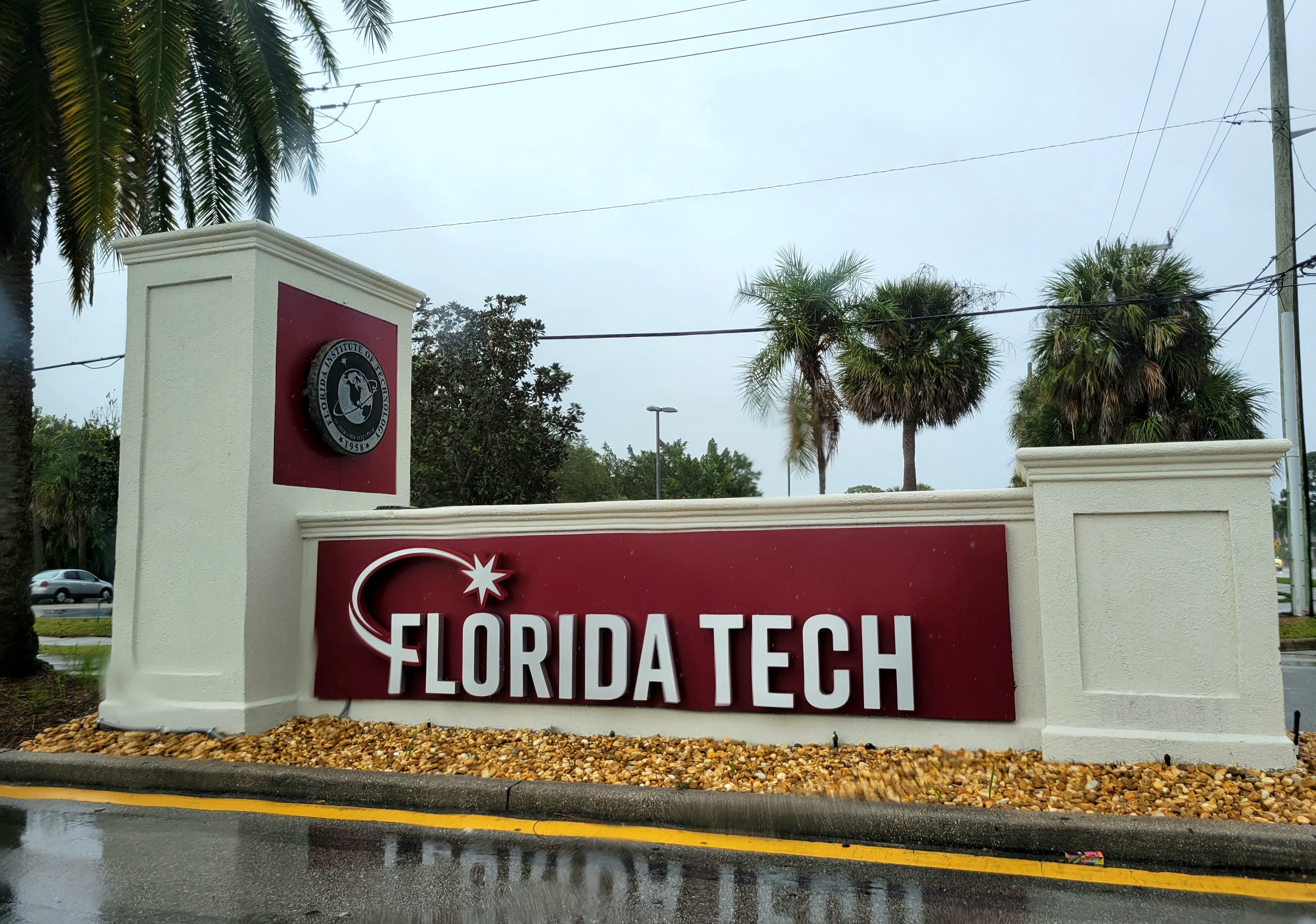
Florida Tech entrance signage

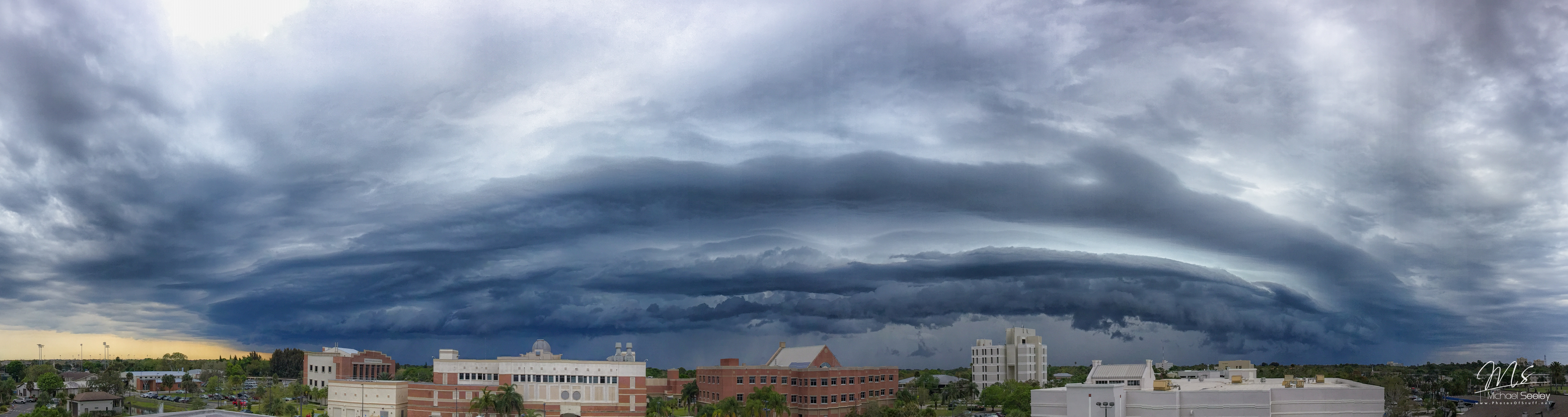
Florida Institute of Technology main campus

The university's 130-acre main campus is located in Melbourne, Florida, on what is known as the Space Coast region along the Atlantic Ocean. The university offers many student services including tutoring, health services, health insurance, and campus safety. Florida Tech has six residence halls and three apartment-style accommodations for on-campus living.

=== Off-campus sites ===
Florida Tech offers specialized graduate degree programs through sites in Titusville, near Kennedy Space Center and Orlando. The university also operates the Center for Advanced Manufacturing and Innovative Design (CAMID) in Palm Bay to solve manufacturing and engineering design challenges for corporate partners. The Ralph S. Evinrude Marine Operations Center and Mertens Marine Center are located on Crane Creek at Melbourne Harbor. The Emil Buehler Center for Aviation Training and Research near Melbourne Orlando International Airport opened in 2009.

== Academics ==
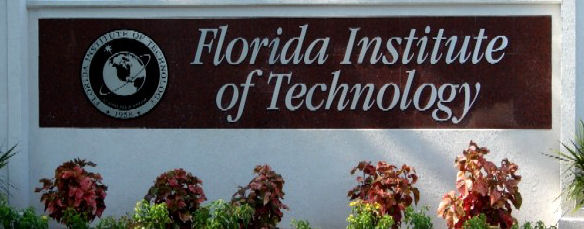
Florida Tech sign from Babcock entrance

=== Student demographics ===
In fall 2024, Florida Tech enrolled 4,727 students at the main campus; 374 at off-campus locations; and 4,762 online for a total of 9,863 students. The male-to-female ratio in the student body was 68:32. 91% of all students came from the United States, 38% of students were from Florida and 7% of all students came from other countries. In 2024, the average combined Critical Reading and Math SAT score of incoming freshmen at the undergraduate level of Florida Tech was 1220.

=== Colleges and academic divisions ===
The university offers degrees in a variety of science and engineering disciplines and is one of the few universities to offer aviation degrees. The university is divided into four academic colleges: College of Aeronautics, College of Engineering and Science, Nathan M. Bisk College of Business, College of Psychology and Liberal Arts.

=== Accreditation ===
Florida Institute of Technology is accredited by the Southern Association of Colleges and Schools Commission on Colleges (SACSCOC). The Engineering programs are accredited by the Engineering Accreditation Commission of the Accreditation Board for Engineering and Technology (ABET). The Computer Science program is accredited by the Computer Science Accreditation Commission of the Computing Sciences Accreditation Board. Florida Tech's chemistry program is accredited by the Committee on Professional Training of the American Chemical Society. Aeronautical Science and Aviation Management programs are accredited by the Council on Aviation Accreditation. The Clinical Psychology PsyD program is accredited by the American Psychological Association and the graduate Behavior Analysis programs by the Association for Behavior Analysis International (ABAI).

=== Rankings ===
Academic rankings

National
- U.S. News & World Report: 231
- Washington Monthly: 426
- WSJ/College Pulse: 498

Global
- THE: 801–1000
- U.S. News & World Report: 1189

Times Higher Education ranks Florida Tech as one of the top 1,000 universities in the world. Florida Tech was also listed as a top 800 world university in the 2017 Academic Ranking of World Universities. U.S. News & World Report ranks Florida Tech 231 among national universities in the U.S., 156 for undergraduate engineering programs, and 328 in social mobility.

PayScale ranks Florida Tech 117 in the U.S. based on return on investment (ROI) earnings. In 2012, Bloomberg rated Florida Tech as the best Florida college in ROI, using their own methodology and data from PayScale. The Brookings Institution ranked Florida Tech first in Florida and 94th nationally for alumni earnings in 2015, also using data from PayScale. CollegeNET ranked Florida Tech 1,012 out of 1,205 colleges for enabling social mobility in 2024.

In 2024, Niche ranked Florida Tech 221 out of 2,650 colleges in America after surveying students and recent alumni about their experiences on and off campus. The university received A's in the areas of academics, diversity, professors, and campus food.

Barron's ranks Florida Tech a "best buy" in college education. Florida Tech is also listed as a top technical institution in the Fiske Guide to Colleges. Florida Tech was named by Times Higher Education as one of the top universities in the United States for graduate employability in 2024.

=== Research ===
Florida Tech is classified as a Doctoral University: Higher Research Activity. In 2022, Florida Tech was awarded $17.7 million in external research funding. From 2009 to 2012, the number of Florida Tech faculty who serve as principal investigators increased by 100% including four recipients of the National Science Foundation (NSF) Career Awards. During this time period, five new interdisciplinary research institutes were initiated that are the focal point for Florida Tech undergraduate and graduate research. These new research university institutes include:

- Indian River Lagoon Research Institute
- Human-Centered Design Institute
- Institute for Energy Systems
- Institute for Marine Research
- Institute for Materials Science & Nanotechnology
- Institute for Research on Global Climate Change

Other research facilities include:

- Harris Institute for Assured Information
- Center for Advanced Manufacturing and Innovative Design (CAMID)
- Institute for Computing and Information Systems
- Center for Advanced Coatings (formerly the National Center for Hydrogen Research)

- Plasma Spray Thermal Laboratory
- High Heat Flux Laser Test Laboratory
- Material Science Analysis Laboratory

- Institute for Biological and Biomedical Sciences
- National Center for Small Business Information
- Institute for Culture, Collaboration & Management

In the College of Science and Engineering, some of the research laboratories and research groups include:

- BioComplex Laboratory
- Information Characterization and Exploitation Laboratory
- Center for Software Testing Research
- Computer Vision Group
- Laboratory for Learning Research
- Laser, Optics, and Instrumentation Laboratory
- Ortega Observatory
- Robotics and Spatial Systems
- Software Evolution Laboratory
- Wind and Hurricane Impact Research Laboratory
- Wireless Center of Excellence

Faculty and students in the Physics/Space Science department conduct research in Astronomy and Astrophysics, Planetary Sciences, High Energy Physics (experimental particle physics), Lightning, Solid State and Condensed Matter Physics, and Space and Magnetospheric Physics.

The Florida Academy of Sciences is headquartered at Florida Tech. The academy is the Florida affiliate of the American Association for the Advancement of Science. The academy also sponsors the Florida Junior Academy of Science and publishes the Florida Scientist journal.

On April 23, 2019, Florida Tech was elected to the Universities Space Research Association.

=== Evans Library ===
The Evans Library at Florida Tech was opened in 1984. Prior to the opening of the Evans Library, the university had a library in what is now the Keuper building. One of the features of the Evans Library is its Applied Computing Center (ACC). The ACC has 70 computers for student use which have high-speed internet connection and access to software programs including word-processing, statistical analysis, programming, and presentation development software. The Special Collections Department at the Evans Library is home to the Radiation, Inc. Archives which houses documents such as manuals, photographs, correspondence, physical objects, and other memorabilia from Radiation, Inc. Radiation Inc., which later became Harris Corporation and then L3Harris Technologies, was an advanced radio communications company located in Melbourne, FL which had a large impact on the city as well as on Florida Tech. Radiation Inc.'s cofounder Homer Denius helped to finance Florida Tech in its early years while cofounder George Shaw served as the first chairman of Florida Tech's board of trustees. The Denius Student Center and Shaw Hall at Florida Tech are named in their honor. The Evans Library Special Collections Department collaborated with retired Radiation, Inc. employees in collecting materials for the Radiation, Inc. Archives.

== Athletics ==
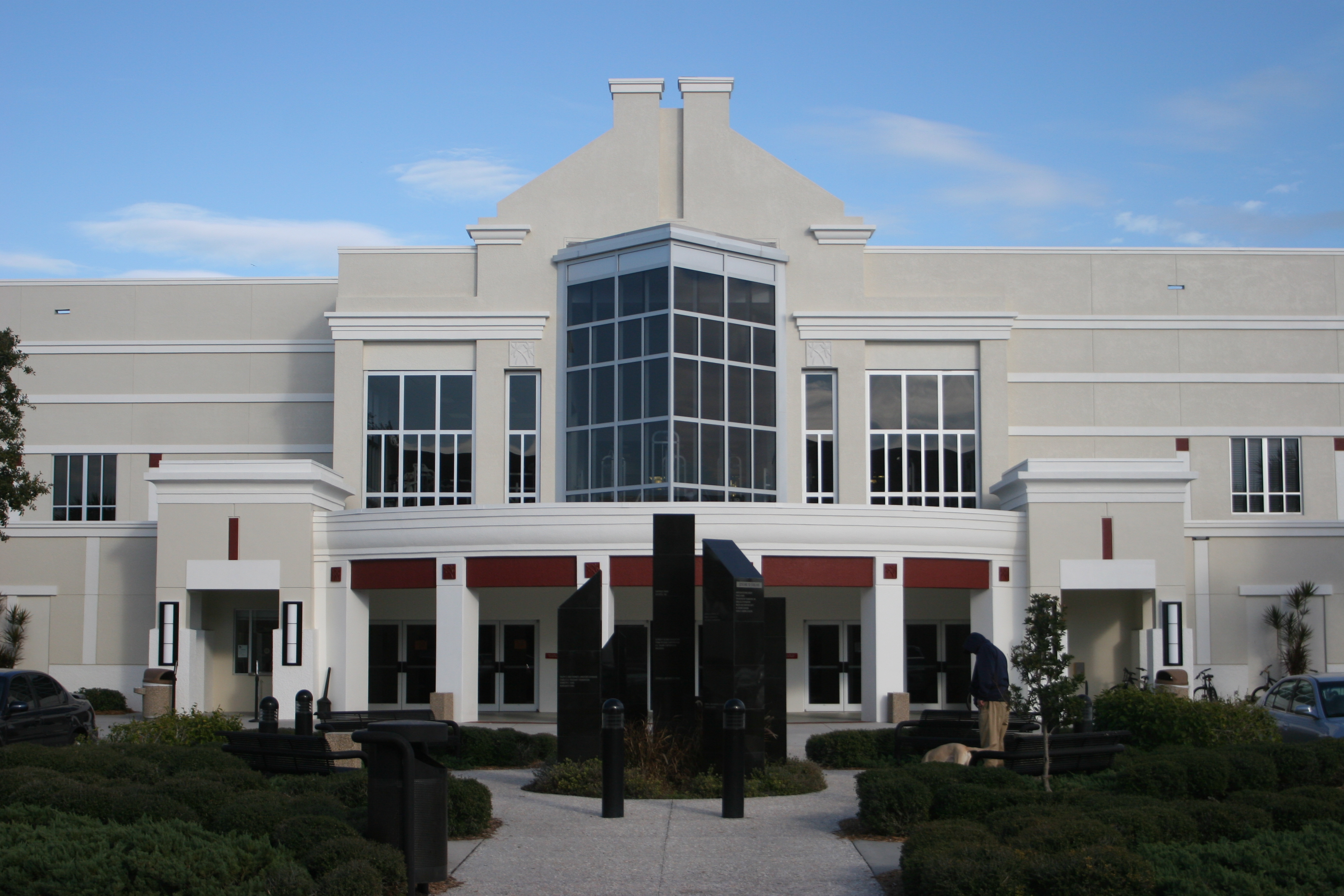
Florida Tech Clemente Center

Florida Tech's athletic teams are known as the Panthers. The school fields teams in 15 sports at the NCAA Division II level and is a member of the Sunshine State Conference. The sports include: baseball, men's and women's basketball, men's crew, men's cross country, men's indoor and outdoor track, men's and women’s lacrosse, men's and women's soccer, softball, men's and women's swimming, and women's volleyball. The men's and women's swimming teams were added in fall 2011 and men's lacrosse in Spring 2012. In 2015, Florida Tech Track joined the Peach Belt Conference as associate members.

The university had a football program from 2013 to 2019. The football team played in the NCAA Division II Gulf South Conference as an affiliate member. It won its first game, its first homecoming game, and its first bowl game. In May 2020, Florida Tech shut down its football program due to budget cuts that followed the COVID-19 pandemic.

Boston Red Sox pitcher Tim Wakefield attended Florida Tech and set the home run record in 1987 as a first baseman. His number (3) was retired in 2006.

Florida Tech teams and individuals have won several national championships. The men's soccer team won the NCAA Division II National Championship in 1988 and 1991. Daniela Iacobelli won the National NCAA Division II Women's Golf Championship in 2007. Florida Tech's Men's swimming 200-yard freestyle relay team won their event in the NCAA Division II National Swim Championship in 2017.

== Student life ==
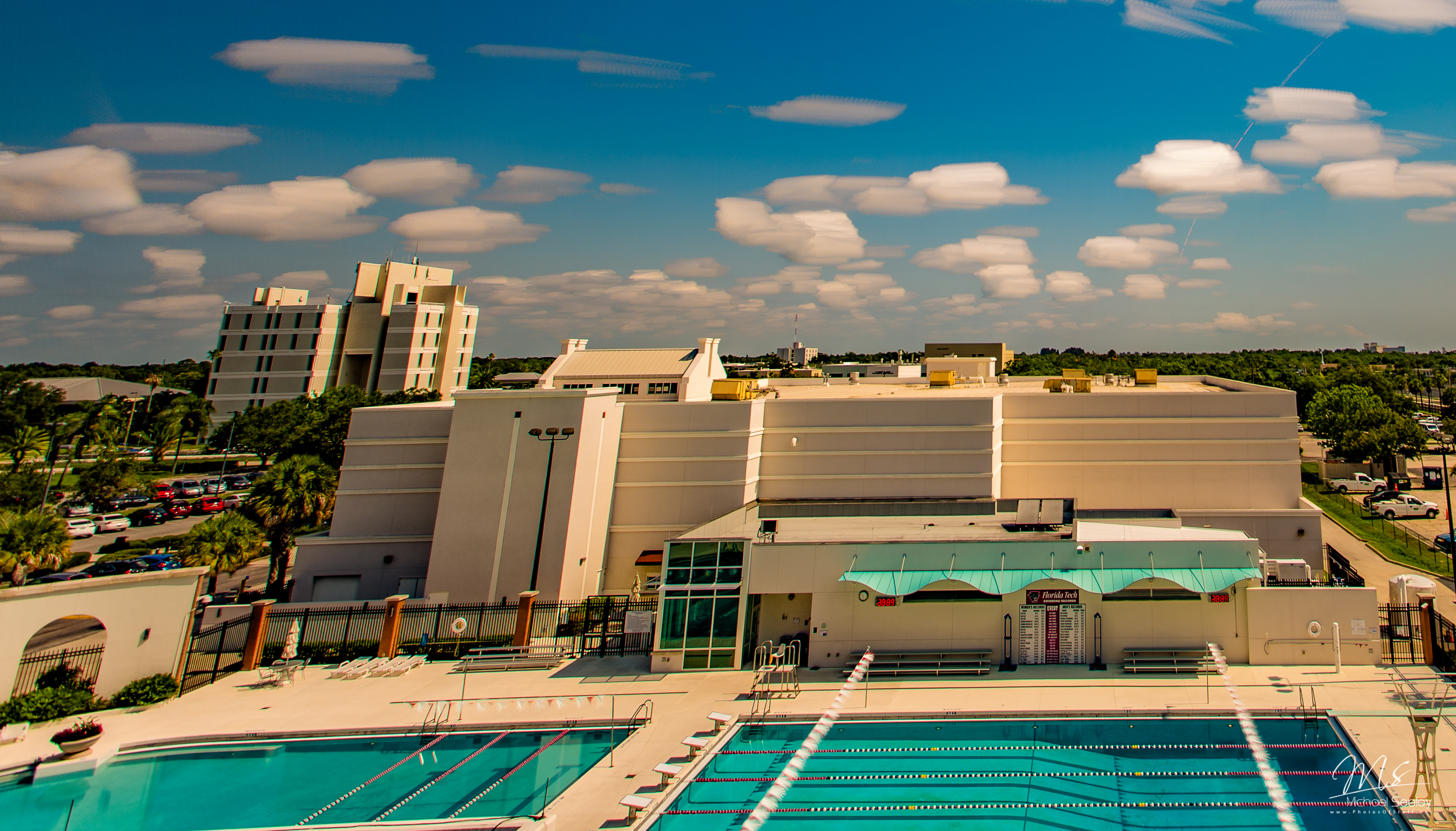
Part of Florida Tech campus

=== On-campus housing ===
Florida Institute of Technology has six traditional residence halls, an eight-building Southgate Apartments complex, a seven-building Columbia Village set of suites and a three-building Harris Village set of suites.

=== Off-campus housing ===
Florida Tech runs apartment-style housing options located near campus at Mary Star of the Sea - Newman Hall and Panther Bay Apartments.

=== Student organizations ===
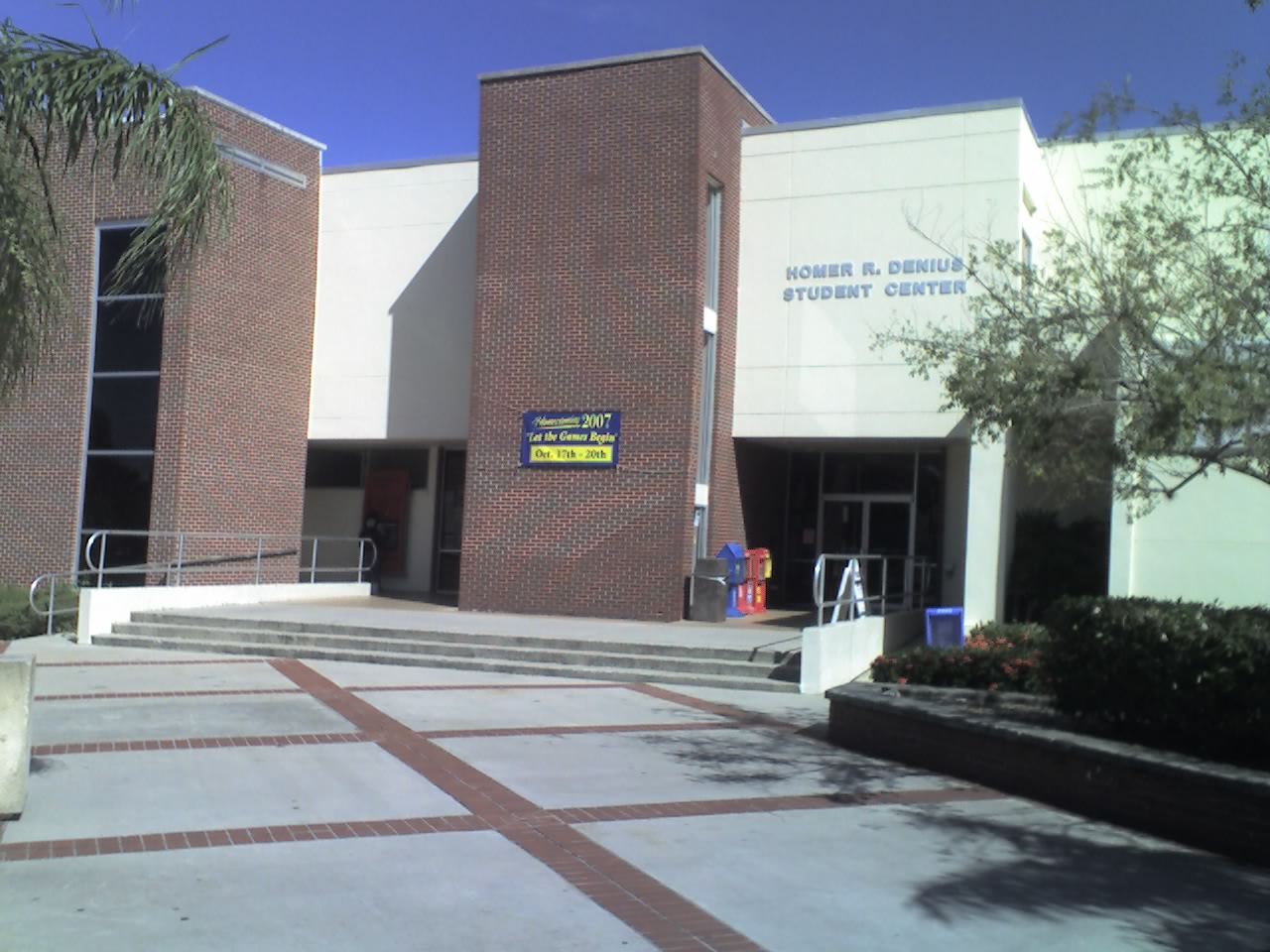
Student Union Building

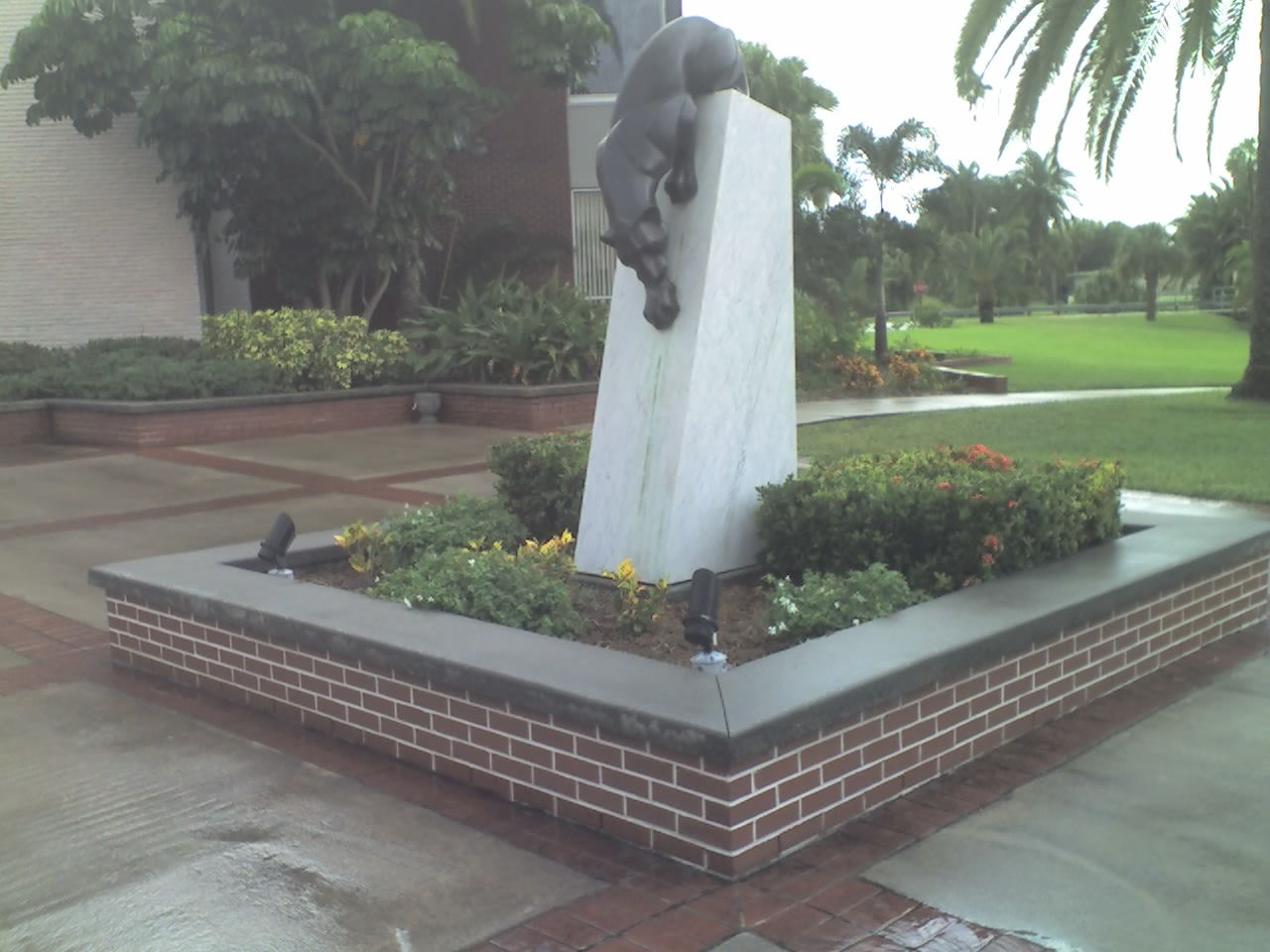
Florida Tech Panther

Florida Institute of Technology has 132 active student organizations on campus. The university-sponsored student organizations, such as Student Government Association, Campus Activities Board, the Homecoming Committee, FITV (CCTV Channel 99 on campus), and The Crimson (student-run university newspaper) operate on primary university funding. Some organizations are run by membership dues, such as the many fraternities and sororities on campus, as well as certain professional organizations like American Society of Civil Engineers (ASCE), IEEE and AIAA. Other organizations are operated via Student Activities Funding Committee funding, overseen by the Student Government Association Treasurer. Organizations like Residence Hall Association, ACM, Anime Club, and others are operated by SAFC funding. The first of these, the Society for Science Fiction and Fantasy, was established in 1960 by founding president Jerome Keuper and still runs today. Arts, media, and performance organizations include: Amateur Radio Club, Belletrist, College Players, Dance Association, Film Society, FITV, Florida Tech Pep Band, The Crimson and WFIT.

Students at Florida Tech have the opportunity to participate in a number of club and intramural sports in addition to the varsity athletics programs. The university offers intramural sports: Flag Football, Ultimate Frisbee, martial arts, paintball, Disc Golf and Judo. Sport clubs include ice hockey, soccer, table tennis, Collegiate wrestling and baseball. The Florida Tech ice hockey program is a member of the American Collegiate Hockey Association, playing at that organization's Division 3 level.

=== Greek life ===
Florida Tech has a number of Greek life opportunities for students.

=== Honor societies ===
The university offers a number of national and international Honor Societies including the Beta Beta Beta Biological Honor Society, Chi Epsilon a Civil Engineering Students honor society, Delta Mu Delta business honor society, Phi Eta Sigma National Honor Society for freshman class academic achievement, Phi Kappa Phi general academic honor society, Psi Chi honor society of psychology, Tau Beta Pi national engineering honor society and Upsilon Pi Epsilon computing and information systems honor society.

== Publications ==
The university publishes the Florida Tech Crimson, a student published newspaper. The Crimson won a Society of Professional Journalists Regional Mark of Excellence Award in 2014 for best in-depth reporting at a small school (fewer than 9,999 students). In 2016, the College of Aeronautics launched an on-line publication, the International Journal of Aviation Sciences. The university also publishes the Florida Tech Magazine.

== Notable people ==
Florida Tech alumni include six NASA astronauts, as well as graduates who have served as leaders in STEM, government, the military, and executive fields.

Notable Florida Institute of Technology alumni include:

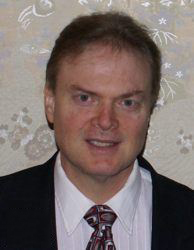
Richard Adams
Inventor of Happy disk drives

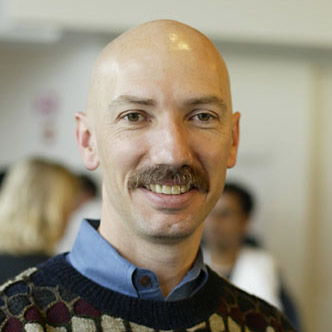
Frank J. Canova
Inventor of the
first smartphone

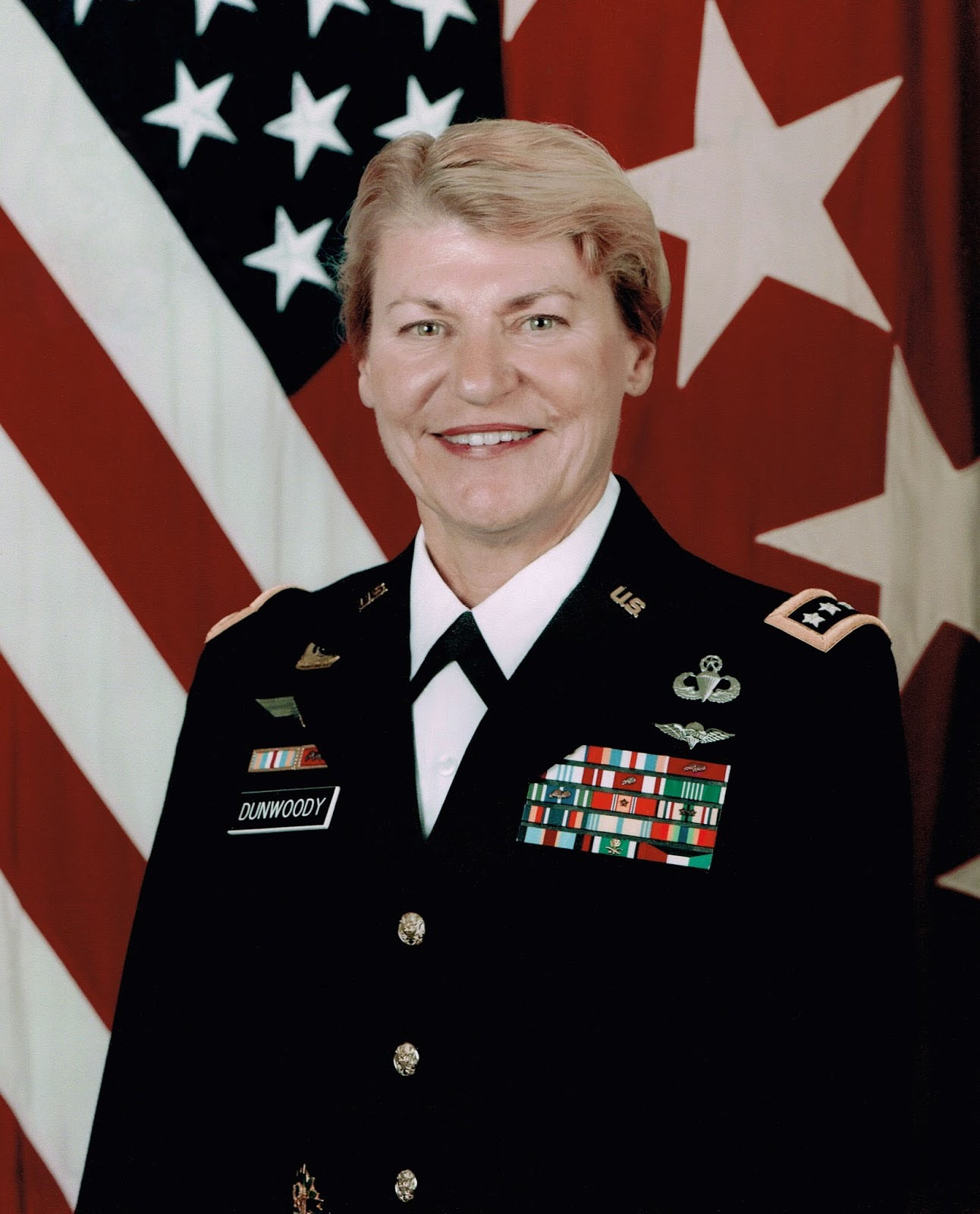
Ann E. Dunwoody
First female U.S. Army
four-star general

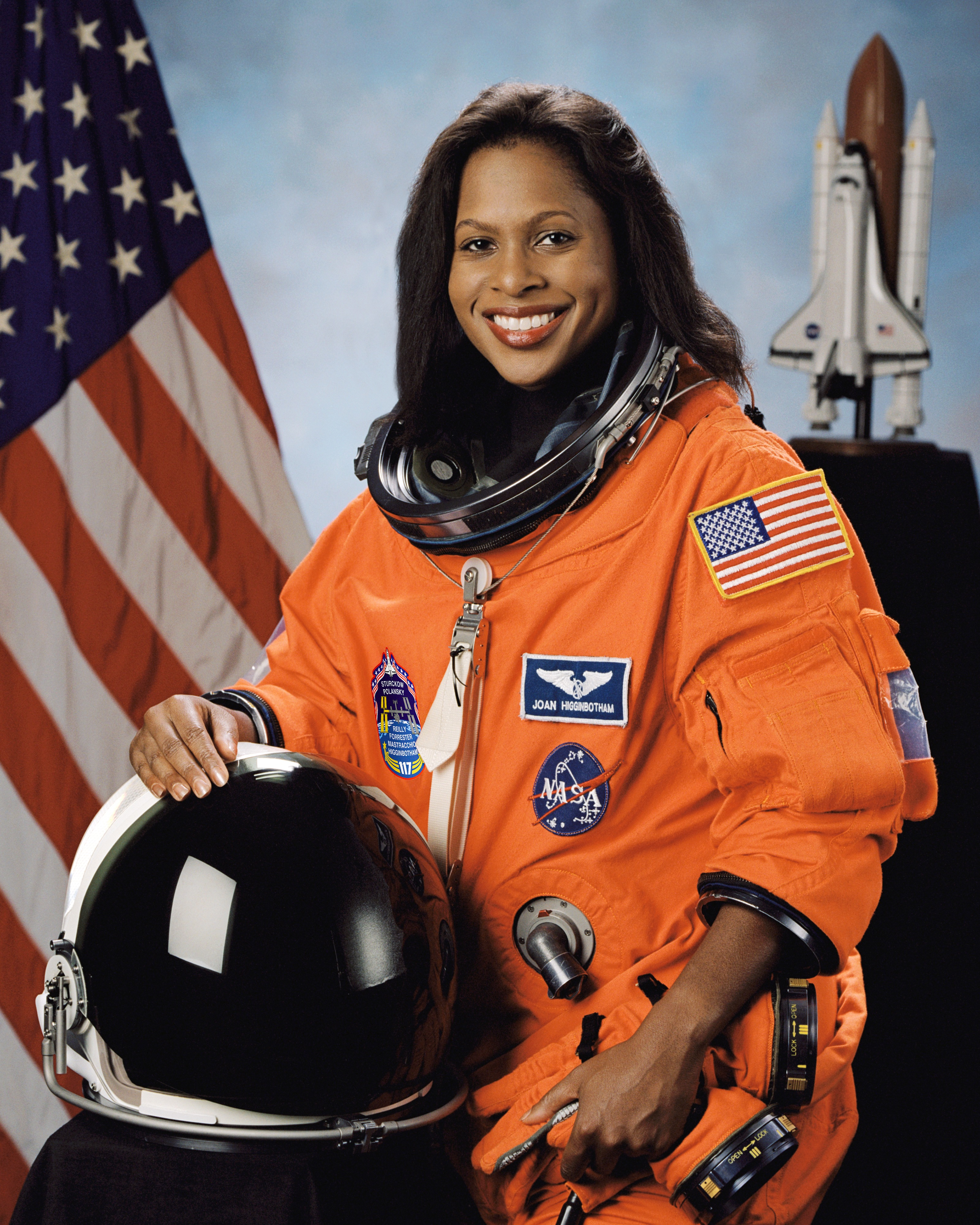
Joan Higginbotham
NASA astronaut
(STS-116 mission)

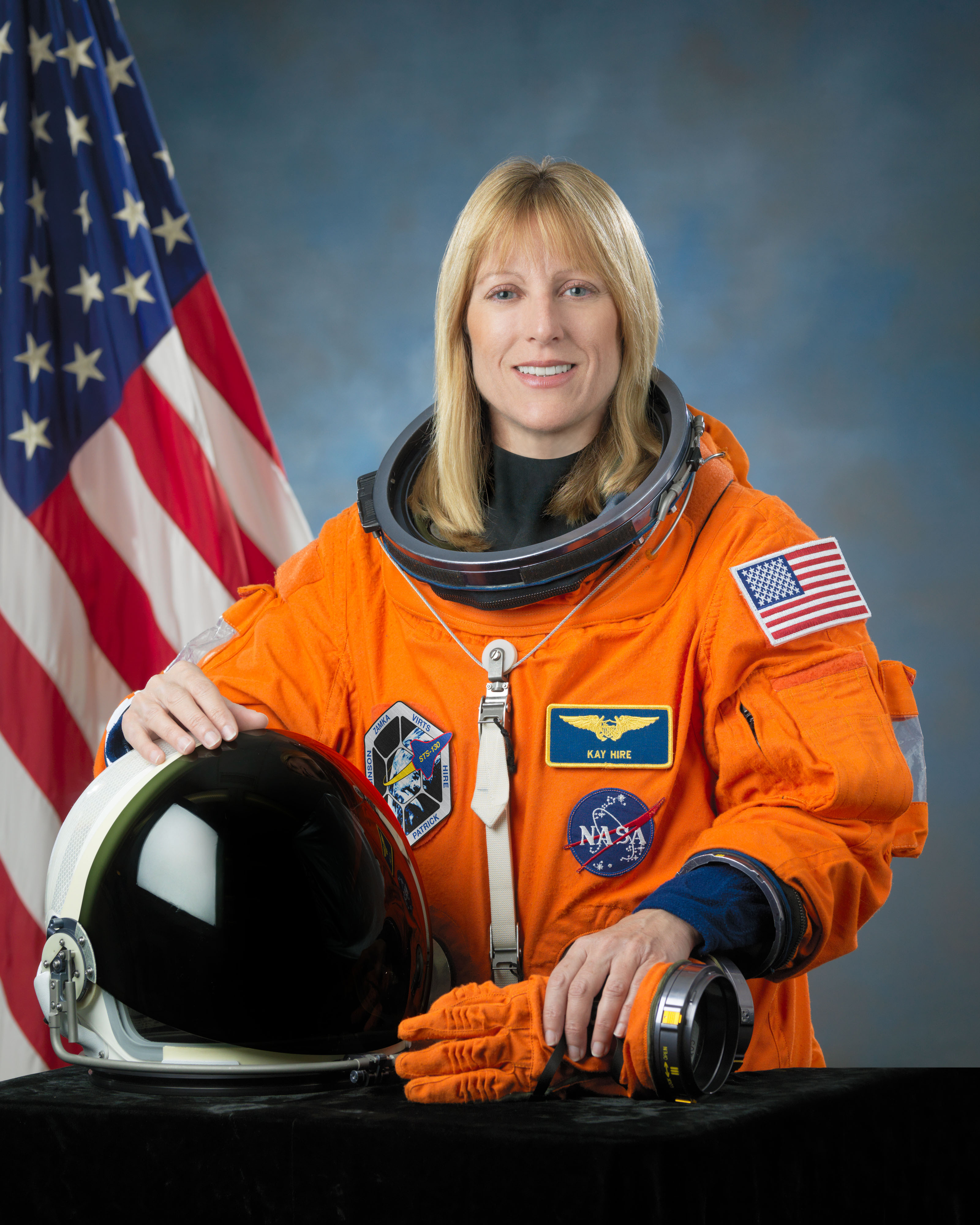
Kathryn "Kay" Hire
NASA astronaut
(STS-90 mission)

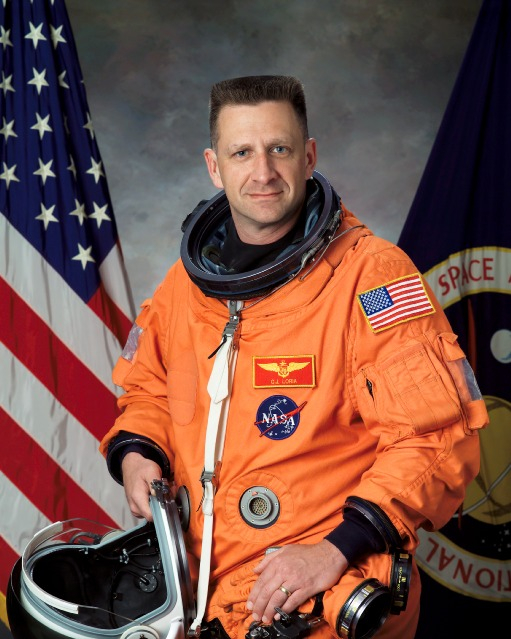
Christopher "Gus" Loria
NASA astronaut &
Marine Corps colonel

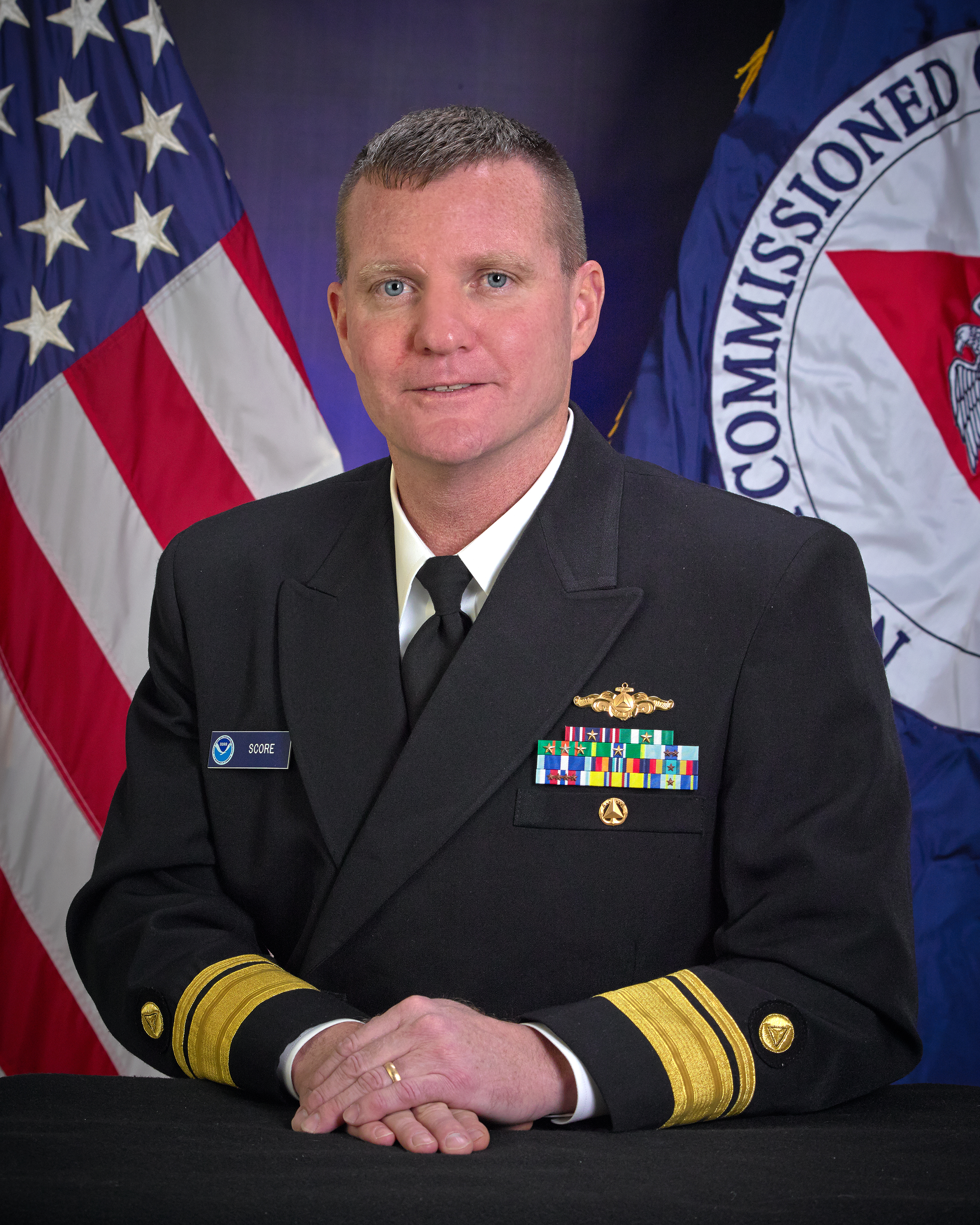
David A. Score
Rear Admiral,
17th Director of NOAA Corps

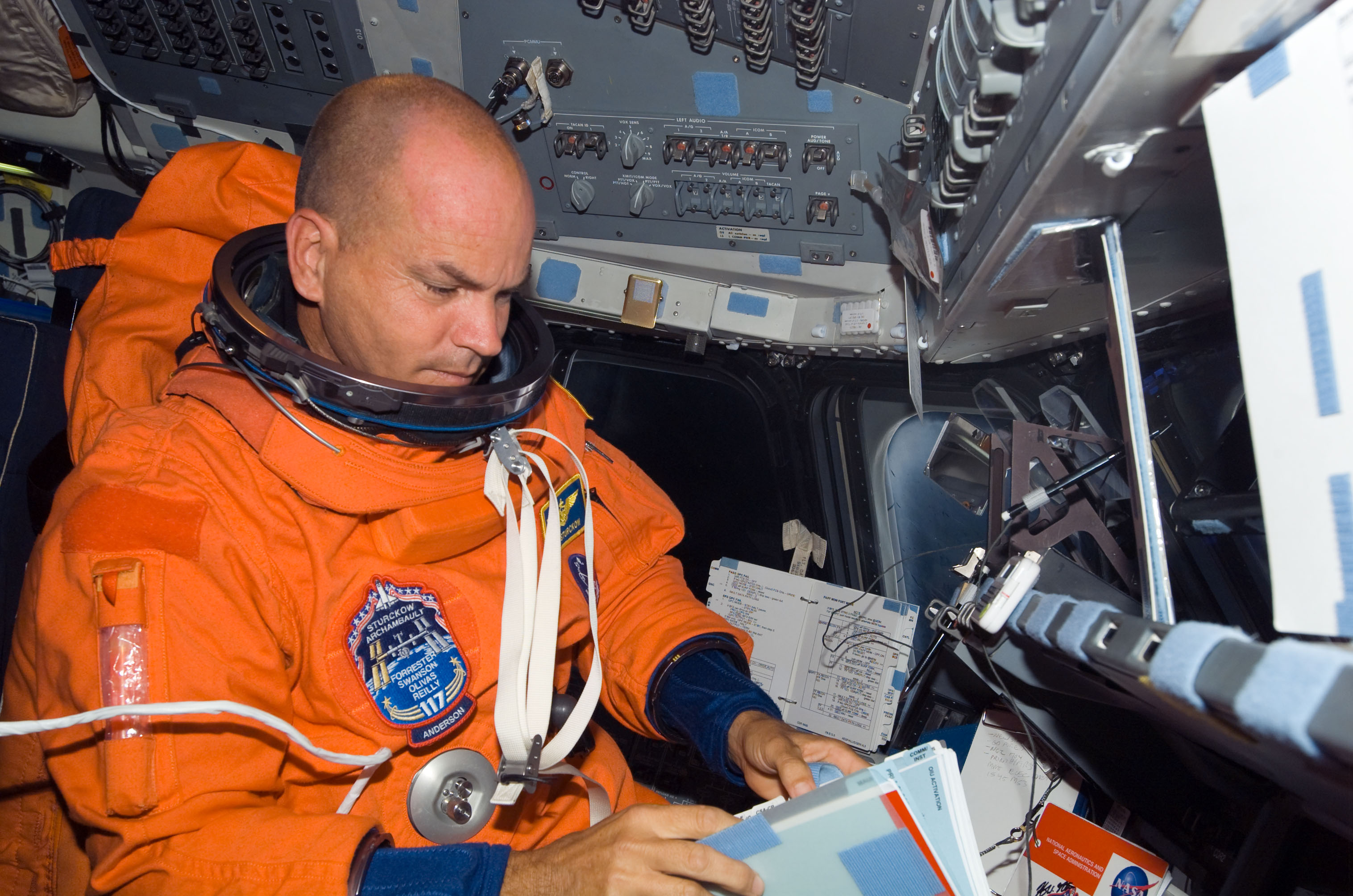
Rick Sturckow
NASA astronaut &
commercial astronaut

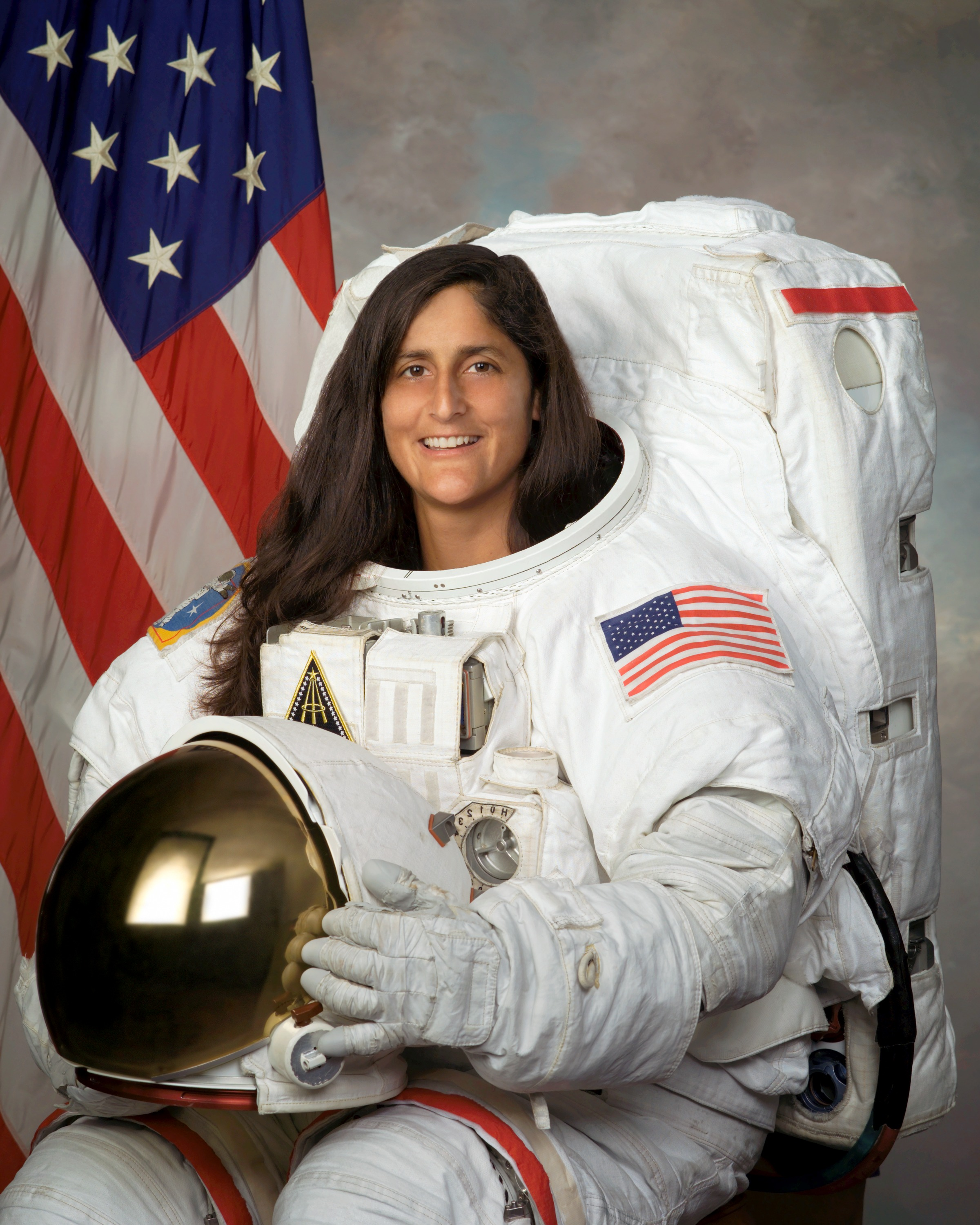
Sunita Williams
NASA astronaut
(ISS commander)

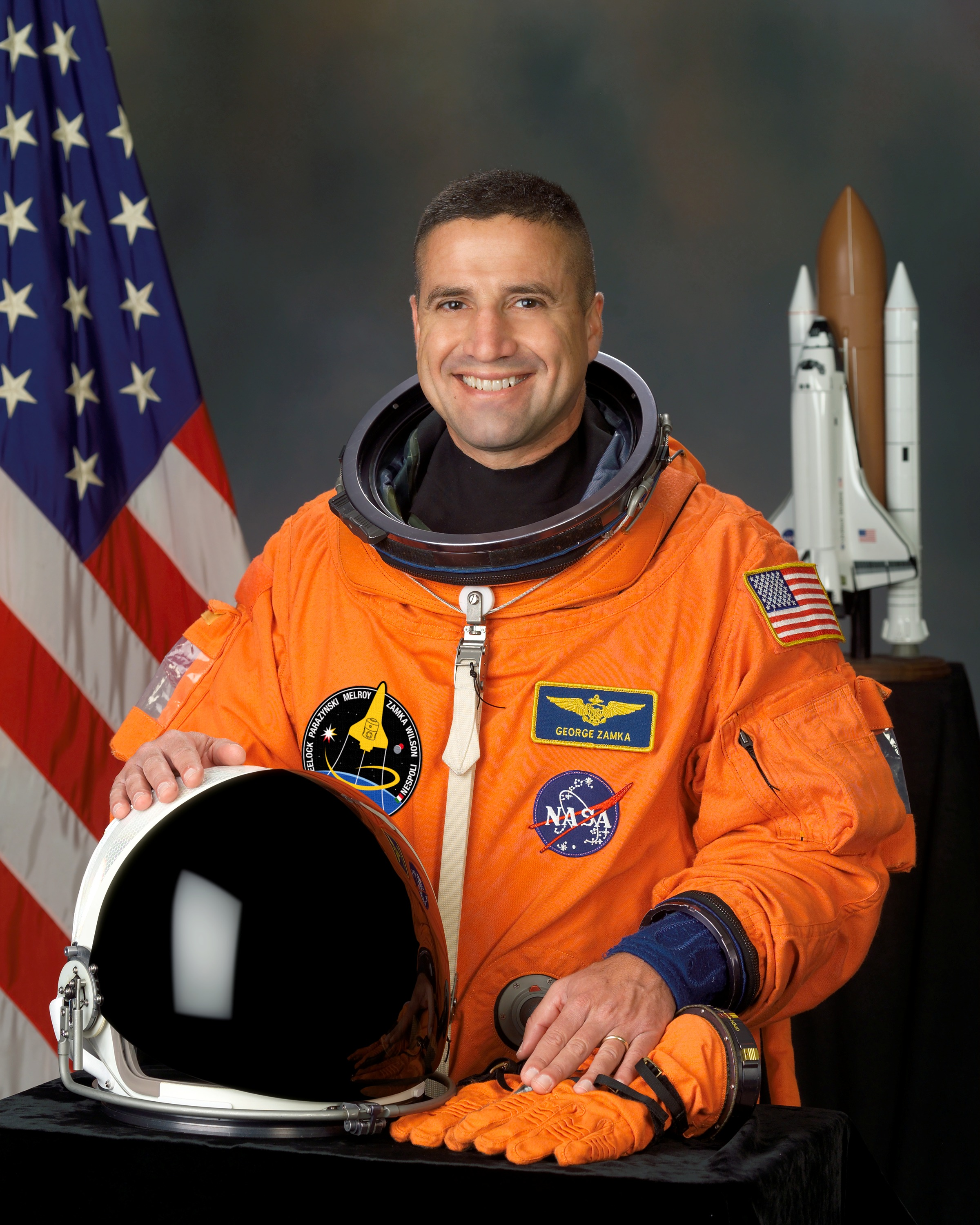
George "Zambo" Zamka
NASA astronaut
(STS-120 & STS-130)

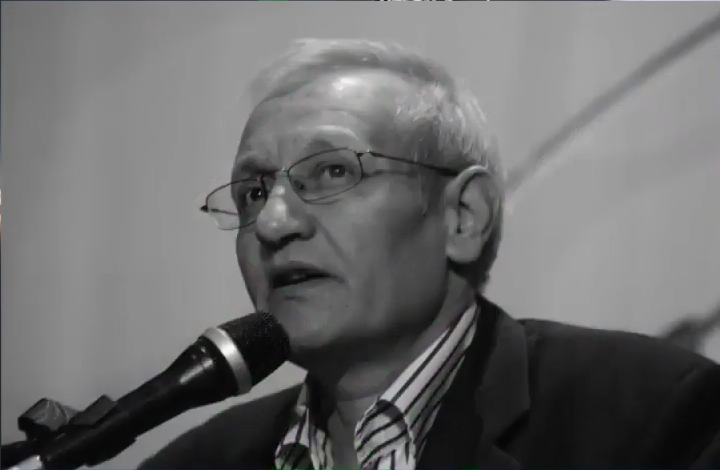
Ayat Karimi (father of insurance science in Iran)

== See also ==
- Independent Colleges and Universities of Florida
