= Ruth Funk Center for Textile Arts =

Textile museum in Melbourne, Florida, US

- Established: 2009
- Location: 150 W. University Blvd. Florida Institute of Technology; Melbourne, Florida
- Coordinates: 28.066085°N 80.623240°W
- Type: Textile museum
- Website: textiles.fit.edu

The Ruth Funk Center for Textile Arts was a museum in Melbourne, Florida, located in Brevard County. It was part of Florida Institute of Technology and exhibited textiles, clothing and accessories.

Opened in 2009, the Center featured an international collection of historical and contemporary textiles, embroidery, clothing, lace, samplers and accessories from North America, Europe, Africa, Japan, India and Central Asia. The collection also included contemporary wearable art and fiber arts.

The museum was named after its founding benefactor, Ruth E. Funk, an artist and designer, who donated funds and her collection of international textiles to the museum in 2006.

The museum was closed in 2021 and the Florida Tech Esports Center was instituted in its location.
