= Melbourne Orlando International Airport =

Airport in Florida, United States

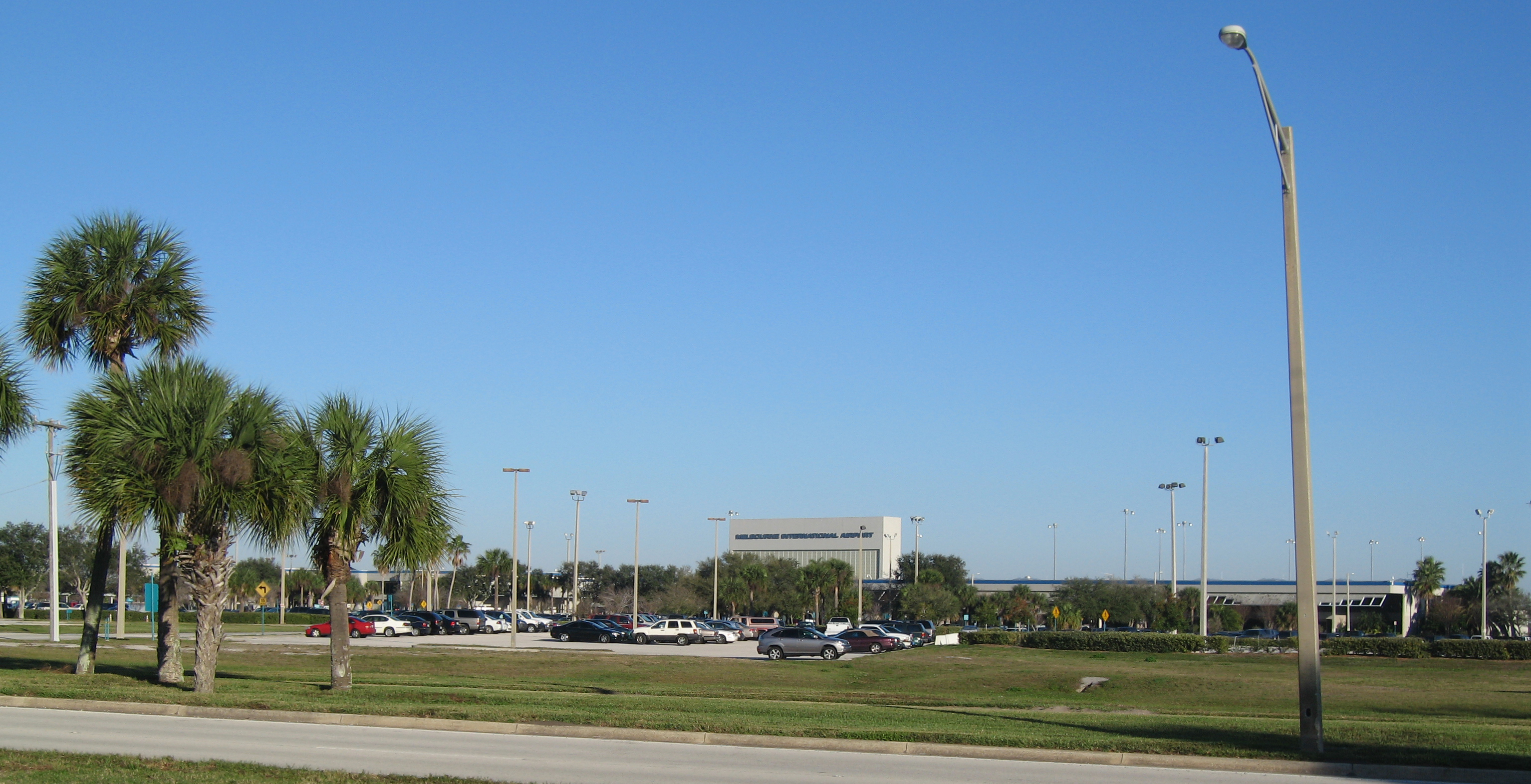
- IATA: MLB; ICAO: KMLB; FAA LID: MLB; WMO: 72204

Summary
- Airport type: Public
- Owner: City of Melbourne
- Operator: Melbourne Airport Authority
- Serves: Brevard County, Florida; Greater Orlando
- Location: Melbourne, Florida, U.S.
- Elevation AMSL: 33 ft (10 m)
- Coordinates: 28°06′10″N 080°38′43″W
- Website: www.mlbair.com

Maps
- FAA airport diagram
- Interactive map of Melbourne Orlando; International Airport

Runways
Direction	Length		Surface
Direction	ft	m	Surface
09R/27L	10,181	3,103	Asphalt
09L/27R	6,000	1,829	Asphalt
05/23	3,001	915	Asphalt

Statistics (2025)
- Total Passengers: 663,919 ▼7.3%
- Aircraft operations: 162,794
- Based aircraft: 264 (2020)
- Source: Federal Aviation Administration

Melbourne Orlando International Airport (IATA: MLB, ICAO: KMLB, FAA LID: MLB) is a public airport 1.5 miles (2.4 km) northwest of downtown Melbourne, in Brevard County, Florida, United States, and 70 miles (113 km) southeast of Orlando, located on central Florida's Space Coast. The airport is reached by NASA Boulevard (State Road 508). There is a VOR-DME located on the field. It is governed by a seven-member board which is appointed by the Melbourne City Council and the private sector. The airport budget is part of the Melbourne municipal budget; the airport receives no local tax dollars. The projected expenses for 2010 were $14.1 million. The executive director of the airport is Greg Donovan, A.A.E.

Previously named Melbourne International Airport, in 2015 the airport had been renamed Orlando Melbourne International Airport. However, due to a lawsuit claiming this name was misleading to passengers, the airport changed its name to Melbourne Orlando International Airport in May 2021.

== History ==
=== Early years ===
Melbourne International Airport began in 1928 when a Pitcairn Aircraft landed on a cow pasture strip north of Kissimmee Highway. Airmail service started in late 1928 when the airport was designated a fueling stop. In 1933, the City of Melbourne acquired 160 acres (65 ha) west of Indian River Bluff to develop as a new airport, which was further developed and operated as Naval Air Station Melbourne during World War II.

Returned to the city as a Surplus Property Airport after the War, Melbourne Airport was deeded to the city in 1947. It was a municipal airport until 1967 when the city created the Melbourne Airport Authority to plan, operate, maintain, and develop the airport, then called Melbourne Municipal Airport. The name was Cape Kennedy Regional Airport and city officials changed the name to Melbourne Regional Airport in 1973 to better reflect its role.

In January 1951, the airport had runways 04/22, 09/27, 13/31 and 16/34, all being listed as being 4,000 to 4,300 feet (1,200 to 1,300 m) long. Scheduled airline flights began in 1953. The April 1957 Official Airline Guide listed four Eastern Airlines departures, Martin 4-0-4s to Vero Beach, Daytona Beach and Jacksonville. National Airlines arrived in 1959 with Douglas DC-6Bs and scheduled the first jet airliner flights in 1963: Douglas DC-8s Miami–Melbourne–New Orleans–Houston–Los Angeles and Los Angeles–Houston–Melbourne–Miami.

In 1960, Meadowlane Elementary School first opened at a Naval hospital on the airport grounds. The school moved to West Melbourne in 1961. In 1969, a National DC-8 flew Los Angeles–Tampa–Melbourne–Miami. Houston and Los Angeles figured in NASA's space program, and Melbourne was close to the NASA Kennedy Space Center. In July 1974, a National Boeing 727 flew Miami–Melbourne–Tampa–New Orleans–Los Angeles–San Diego; National Boeing 727-200s flew direct Houston and New Orleans to Melbourne. In May 1979, National had one flight a day from Melbourne, a 727-200 to Tampa.

In the late 1960s and early 1970s, Eastern Airlines Boeing 727s, Douglas DC-9s and Lockheed Electras flew out of the airport. In June 1967, Eastern announced "The Space Corridor" from Melbourne to three centers in the space program: Huntsville, Alabama, St. Louis and Seattle. Eastern's "Space Corridor" was a Melbourne-Orlando-Huntsville-St. Louis-Seattle Boeing 727-100. In June 1967, Eastern flew nonstop Melbourne to Atlanta, Tampa and Ft. Lauderdale and direct to New York City (JFK Airport), Washington, D.C. (Dulles Airport), Boston and Miami. In February 1976, Eastern flew a 727 direct Los Angeles to Melbourne via Atlanta; Eastern eventually dropped Melbourne upon the airlines closure in 1991.

In the early 1980s, some ending scenes for the film Stranger Than Paradise were shot in the Melbourne area, including several plot scenes shot at the airport (as listed in the credits).People Express Airlines started nonstops to Newark, Baltimore, Columbus and Buffalo, New York in spring 1982 with Boeing 737 jets. They eventually scaled back to just nonstops to Newark and ended service to MLB in 1986. Delta Air Lines started nonstops to Atlanta in 1983 with DC-9s and upgraded to Boeing 737s and MD-80s. In 1999, Spirit Airlines began commercial service to the airport. Presidential Airways had nonstop flights to Daytona Beach and Washington, DC (Dulles), with Boeing 737s and BAE-146 Jets. American Airlines served Melbourne with flights to Raleigh/Durham on MD-80 jets, and Continental flew to Newark Liberty with 727 and 737 aircraft.

The Authority operated a recreational vehicle site, "Port O' Call". This was closed and the tenants evicted in 2003. The intent was to use the property for commercial development. The Melbourne Airport Authority operates Tropical Haven (formerly Trailer Haven), a 760-site manufactured home park.

=== Development since the 2010s ===
In 2010, the airport had nonstop flights to Atlanta on Delta Air Lines and regional partner Atlantic Southeast Airlines, as well as nonstops to Charlotte Douglas International Airport on US Airways' regional subsidiary PSA Airlines. These flights continue on Delta and American. Delta used to fly nonstop from Melbourne to its hubs in Cincinnati; New York–Kennedy and New York–La Guardia; and to Washington–Dulles and Washington–Reagan, though all of this was discontinued. USA3000 Airlines briefly served Melbourne with flights to Baltimore/Washington. Direct Air flew to Niagara Falls, New York, and Punta Gorda, Florida, with 737 and McDonnell Douglas MD-80 jets.

Elite Airways began operating at the airport in 2014 with flights to Washington Dulles International Airport.

In 2015, there were an estimated 15,000 paid attendees to the annual air show over a two-day weekend.

The airport's first scheduled international service was announced by Porter Airlines in September 2015 to Toronto's island airport. The airline discontinued service to the airport in 2019.

In 2015, the airport changed its name to "Orlando Melbourne International Airport." Airport and local tourism officials wanted to brand the airport as a less-congested alternative to Orlando's other two commercial airports, Orlando International Airport and Orlando Sanford International Airport. The airport also believed the name change would attract visitors who wanted to see Walt Disney World, Cape Canaveral, and the area's beaches. The airport is located approximately 70 miles (110 km) southeast of the City of Orlando.

In 2017, a $20 million upgrade was proposed for the airport, 90 percent coming from the Federal Aviation Administration, almost $1 million from the Florida Department of Transportation and $1 million from the airport.

In November 2019, British tour operator and airline TUI Airways announced that, from 2022, they would switch their Orlando operations from their current base at Sanford to Melbourne. This announcement will see a total of 17 weekly flights to/from eight British airports and is to bring their operations nearer to Port Canaveral where TUI's Marella Cruises will sail from in coming years. As a package tour operator, this brings passengers closer to their cruises, although it has angered many TUI passengers who fly with the company to visit Orlando with Walt Disney World and Universal Orlando Resort due to the extended airport transfer time.

In July 2021, the airport announced a $61 million renovation and expansion, in part to prepare for the arrival of TUI Airways' operations from the United Kingdom.

== Facilities and aircraft ==
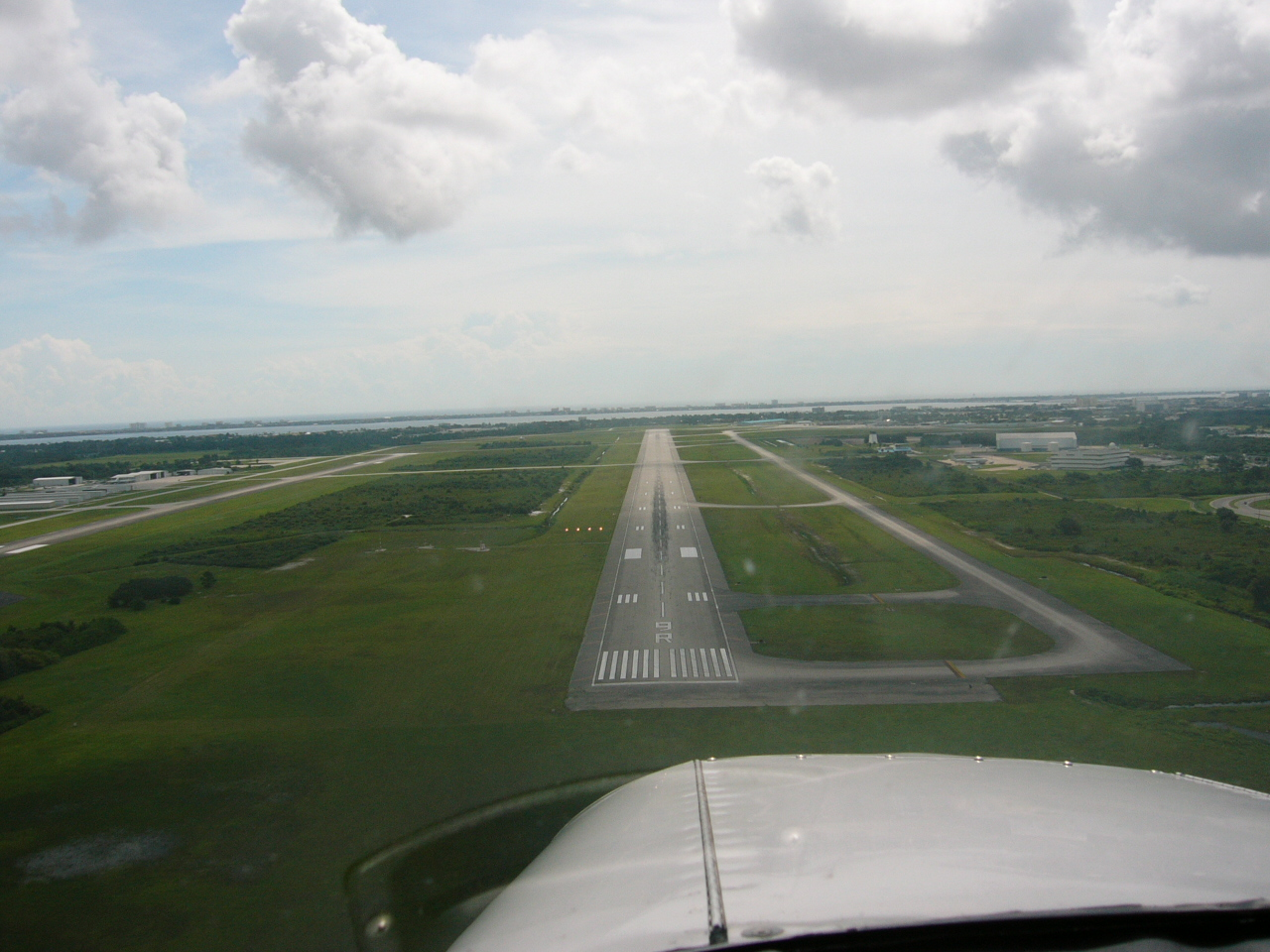
Runway 9R

The airport covers 2,420 acres (979 ha) and has three asphalt runways: 09R/27L is 10,181 × 150 ft (3,103 × 46 m), 09L/27R is 6,000 × 150 ft (1,829 × 46 m) and 05/23 is 3,001 × 75 ft (915 × 23 m). The main terminal building is named the Edward L. Foster Air Terminal.

In the year ending December 31, 2020, the airport had 103,660 aircraft operations, average 284 per day; 93% were general aviation, 4% scheduled commercial, 2% air taxi, and less than 1% military. 264 aircraft at the time were based at this airport: 186 single-engine and 42 multi-engine airplanes, 26 jet, 9 helicopter, and 1 military.

The airport has two fixed-base operators which provide fuel. Amenities such as conference rooms, pilot supplies, and internet are available.

The Airport Museum was in the terminal building. However, a new expansion demolished the museum and replaced it with a news and gift shop.

The Florida Institute of Technology Research, Science and Technology Park covers about 100 acres (40 ha) surrounded by airport tenants such as Northrop Grumman, GE Railway, Rockwell Collins, DRS Technologies, and L3 Harris, and leases property to two hospitals and one hotel.

A new Embraer Business Jet Assembly Facility, intended to employ 200 workers, is under construction. Production facilities are for the Phenom 100 and 300 as well as the Legacy 450 and 500.

In 2010, two companies (AAR Corporation and MidAirUSA) announced plans for facilities at the airport. The companies intended to respectively employ 225 and 300 people. MidAirUSA went bankrupt in 2015; Aeromod International took over the MidAirUSA hangar in 2016.

=== Public safety ===
The airport is served by the Melbourne Airport Authority Police Department for law enforcement services, and by the Melbourne Fire Department for fire and rescue services.

== Airlines and destinations ==
Airlines	Destinations
Allegiant Air	Allentown, Cincinnati, Pittsburgh
American Eagle	Charlotte
Delta Air Lines	Atlanta
Delta Connection	Seasonal: New York–LaGuardia (begins December 19, 2026)
Sun Country Airlines	Seasonal: Minneapolis/St. Paul (resumes January 22, 2027)
TUI Airways	Seasonal: Belfast–International, Glasgow, London–Gatwick, Manchester (UK), Newcastle upon Tyne

Domestic destinations map
{{
Destinations from Orlando Melbourne International Airport
Blue = Future destination
Red = Year-round destination
Green = Seasonal destination
Pink = Destination being terminated

International destinations map
Destinations from Orlando Melbourne International Airport
Blue = Future destination
Red = Year-round destination
Green = Seasonal destination
Pink = Destination being terminated

== Statistics ==
=== Airline traffic ===
According to the airport website, Melbourne Orlando International carried a record 747,691 passengers in 2023, the highest since 1990. Most of the passenger traffic out of MLB is from three airlines: Delta Air Lines, TUI Airways, and PSA Airlines (under American Airlines).

==== Top destinations ====
Busiest domestic routes from MLB (August 2025 – July 2026)
Rank	City	Passengers	Airline
1	Atlanta, Georgia	141,570	Delta
2	Charlotte, North Carolina	64,670	American
3	Allentown, Pennsylvania	16,370	Allegiant
4	Pittsburgh, Pennsylvania	15,220	Allegiant
5	Cincinnati, Ohio	14,550	Allegiant

==== Airline market share ====
Largest airlines at MLB (August 2025 – July 2026)
Rank	Airline	Passengers	Share
1	Delta Air Lines	282,000	56.32%
2	PSA Airlines	127,000	25.42%
3	Allegiant Air	91,440	18.26%

== Flight schools ==
- F.I.T. Aviation Flight School is owned by Florida Institute of Technology for the College of Aeronautics. It offers flight training for fixed wing aircraft for the FAA Private Pilot Certification, Instrument Rating, Commercial Pilot Certification, and Multi-Engine and Advanced Aircraft Training. In 1999, to match a grant for a new engineering building, Florida Tech sold nearly a third of its training fleet.
- Melbourne Flight Training

== Accidents & incidents ==
- On March 17, 1958, an Eastern Air Lines Martin 4-0-4 (flight # unknown) on final approach to MLB struck an unmarked pile of gravel at the approach end of the runway. During the landing roll, the landing gear leg collapsed and the aircraft caught fire and burned. All ten occupants (three crew, seven passengers) evacuated safely.
- On March 3, 2001, a Cessna 182 Skylane operating for the Civil Air Patrol lost directional control and nosed over at the Melbourne Airport. The probable cause of the accident was found to be the pilot's failure to maintain directional control of the airplane during the landing roll of the touch-and-go landing, resulting in the on-ground collision with a ditch and subsequent separation of the nose gear wheel and fork assembly and nose over of the airplane.
- On September 30, 2001, a Piper Warrior lost control during the landing rollout at the Melbourne Airport. The pilot reported a gust of wind blew him off the runway, and he attempted a go-around when he was unable to correct. The probable cause of the accident was found to be the pilot's failure to maintain directional control of the aircraft during the landing rollout while landing in gusty crosswind conditions.
- On March 28, 2002, a Cessna 152 ran off the runway during landing at the Melbourne Airport. The probable cause of the accident was found to be the student pilot's failure to perform a go-around after a bounced landing condition that resulted in the on-ground collision with a ditch.
- On January 4, 2003, a Cessna 172 Skyhawk and a North American AT-6A Texan collided while on the ground at the Melbourne Airport.
- On January 10, 2003, an experimental Shaw Atlantica 235FG collided with the ground shortly after liftoff from the Melbourne Airport. According to the pilot, the purpose of the airplane operation was to complete high speed taxi maneuvers as part of the aircraft certification requirement; no flight was intended. The probable cause of the accident was found to be the pilot's inadvertent liftoff and his failure to maintain airspeed, which resulted in a stall.
- On January 24, 2003, an experimental Maverick Twinjet 1500 collided with trees at the Melbourne Airport. The probable cause of the accident was found to be the pilot's failure to obtain sufficient altitude to clear obstacles at the approach end of the airport, which resulted in an in-flight collision with trees. The sole occupant, the pilot, was killed.
- On April 12, 2003, a Cessna 172 Skyhawk collided with a parked airplane while taxiing at the Melbourne Airport. The probable cause of the accident was found to be the student pilot's improper throttle setting during the braking test, resulting in a collision with a parked airplane.
- On June 18, 2003, a Cessna 172 Skyhawk bounced off the runway on landing and flipped over while landing at the Melbourne Orlando International Airport. The probable cause of the accident was found to be the pilot's improper flare and inadequate recovery from a bounced landing.
- On October 21, 2003, a Cessna 172 Skyhawk was damaged during a hard landing at the Melbourne Orlando International Airport. The probable cause of the accident was found to be the pilot's inadvertent full retraction of the flaps, while recovering from a bounced landing, resulting in an inadvertent stall, uncontrolled descent, and subsequent impact with terrain.
- On March 23, 2006, a Cessna 340 crashed while on approach to the Melbourne Orlando International Airport. The probable cause of the accident was found to be the pilot's failure to maintain adequate airspeed to avoid a stall during the final approach to land. All three occupants perished.
- On November 21, 2006, an experimental Liberty XL-2 impacted the runway during landing at the Melbourne Orlando International Airport. The probable cause of the accident was found to be the student pilot's failure to relinquish control of the airplane when instructed by the certified flight instructor resulting in airspeed not being maintained and an inadvertent stall just above the runway.
- On February 26, 2007, a Robinson R22 was damaged during takeoff from the Melbourne Orlando International Airport. The instructor gave some control to the student during takeoff, but the helicopter spun 2 to 2.5 times above the ground before impacting the surface. The probable cause of the accident was found to be the flight instructor's inadequate remedial action following a loss of control in flight.
- On February 6, 2009, a Piper Warrior II was damaged during a hard landing at the Melbourne Orlando International Airport. The probable cause of the accident was found to be the student pilot's inadequate crosswind landing technique and the certified flight instructor's delayed remedial action, which resulted in a hard landing.
- On February 29, 2012, a Cirrus SR22 crashed while landing at the Melbourne Orlando International Airport. The probable cause of the accident was found to be the pilot's abrupt maneuver in response to a perceived traffic conflict, which resulted in an accelerated stall and a loss of airplane control at low altitude. Contributing to the accident was the air traffic controller's incomplete instructions, which resulted in improper sequencing of traffic landing on the same runway. All three occupants died.
- On May 22, 2012, two Piper Warriors collided while taxiing at the Melbourne Orlando International Airport. One airplane taxiied into the back of the other, which was holding short of the runway. The probable cause was the second pilot’s failure to set the parking brake and to maintain a proper visual lookout, which resulted in an on-ground collision with another airplane.
- On April 4, 2014, a Piper Warrior II operating for the Florida Institute of Technology experienced an engine fire after landing at the Melbourne Orlando International Airport. After the engine quit on a runway exit, the flight instructor onboard attempted to restart it multiple times when smoke began billowing from the engine compartment. The cause of the accident was found to be the flight instructor's overpriming of the engine during multiple unsuccessful engine start attempts on an active runway.
- On May 27, 2015, a Cessna 337 struck buildings and antennas while taxiing at the Melbourne Orlando International Airport. The pilot's loss of directional control was due to alcohol ingestion.
- On February 25, 2017, a Socata TB20 was damaged during landing at the Melbourne Orlando International Airport. The pilot reported noticing a problem with his electrical system and began an emergency landing gear extension. After unsuccessful attempts, the pilot performed a gear-up landing.
- On November 16, 2017, a Piper Arrow II crashed while landing at the Melbourne Orlando International Airport. The pilot was landing at a faster-than-normal speed and said the plane did not settle into a normal roundout, before it veered left and exited the runway. The probable cause of the accident was found to be the pilot's loss of directional control during the landing roll on the wet runway.
- On October 10, 2024, a large part of the terminal's ceiling skylight collapsed as a result of Hurricane Milton.
- On December 26, 2024, a Beechcraft Duchess crashed while approaching Melbourne. The pilot reported he was low on fuel and was trying to restart an engine. The aircraft struck a powerline and crashed.
- On April 18, 2025, a TUI Airways Boeing 787-9, after aborting takeoff, suffered a right gear collapse, causing the plane to veer off the taxiway. The plane, carrying 350 passengers on a flight to Birmingham, was cancelled. No injuries were reported.

== See also ==
- List of airports in Florida
