= Airport Museum (Melbourne, Florida) =

Coordinates: 28.09487°N 80.62813°W

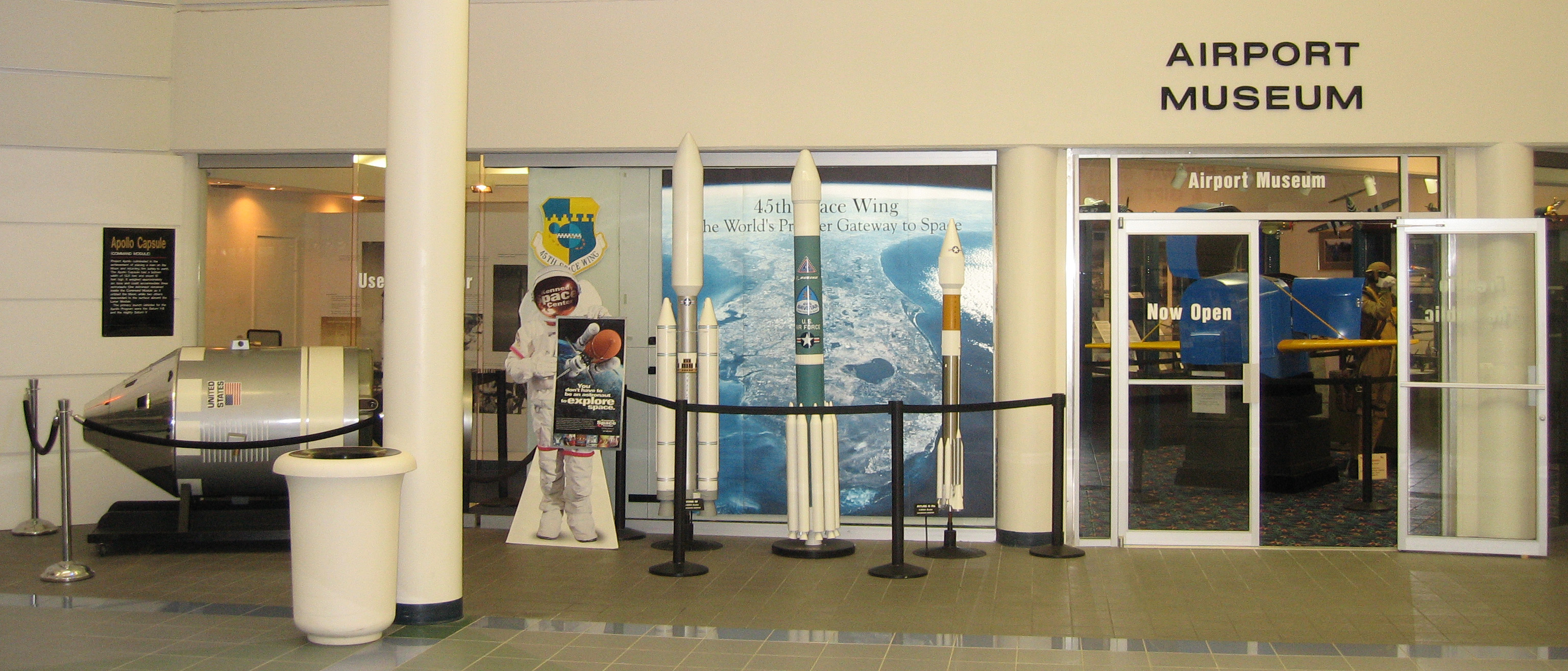
- Location: Melbourne International Airport; One Air Terminal Parkway; Melbourne, Florida
- Type: History

The Airport Museum is located inside the Melbourne International Airport, One Air Terminal Parkway, Melbourne, Florida. It houses displays of the history of the Naval Air Station Melbourne and the Melbourne International Airport. It also contains a Link Trainer and aviation artwork.

== Gallery ==
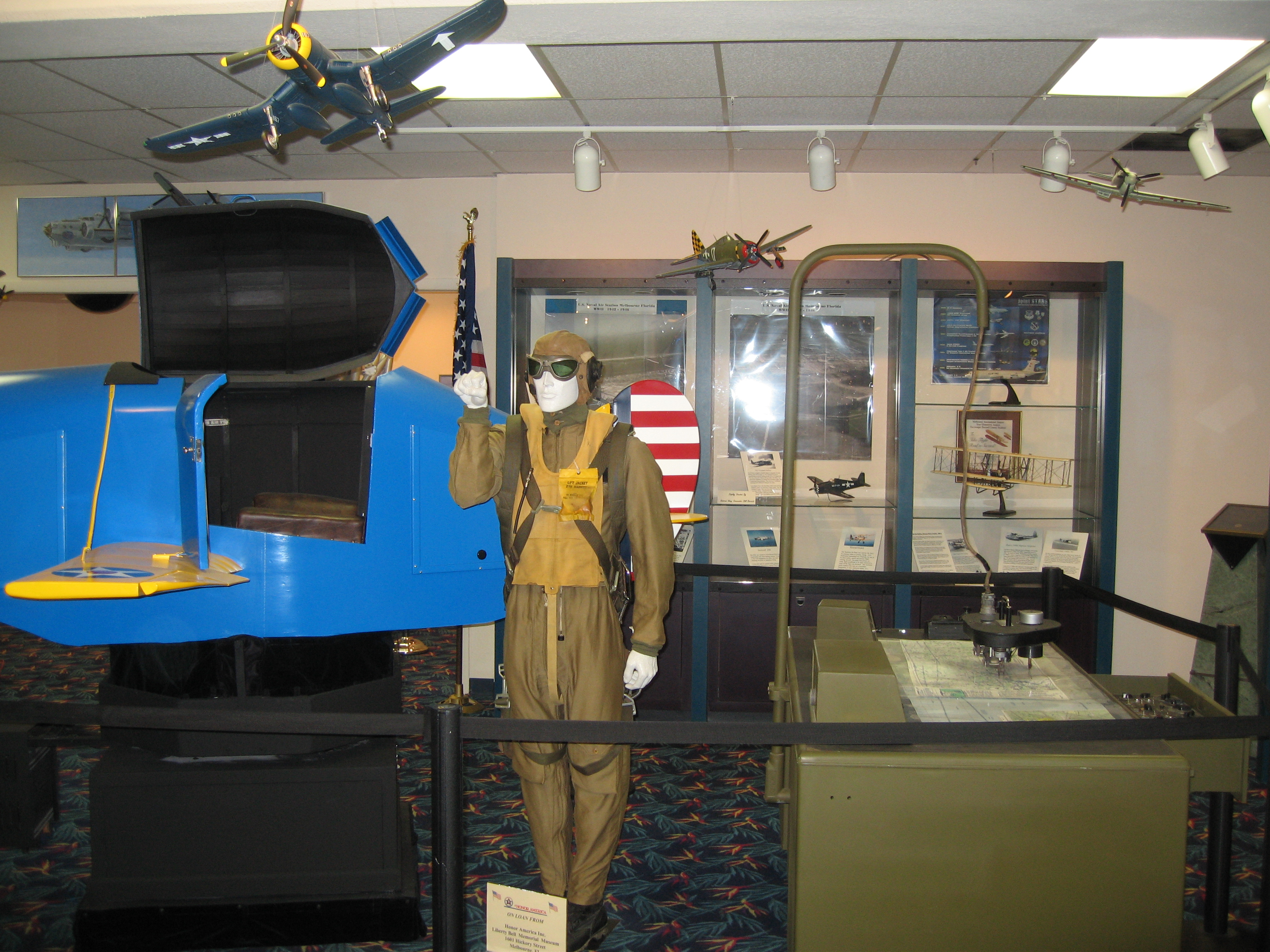
Exhibits inside museum

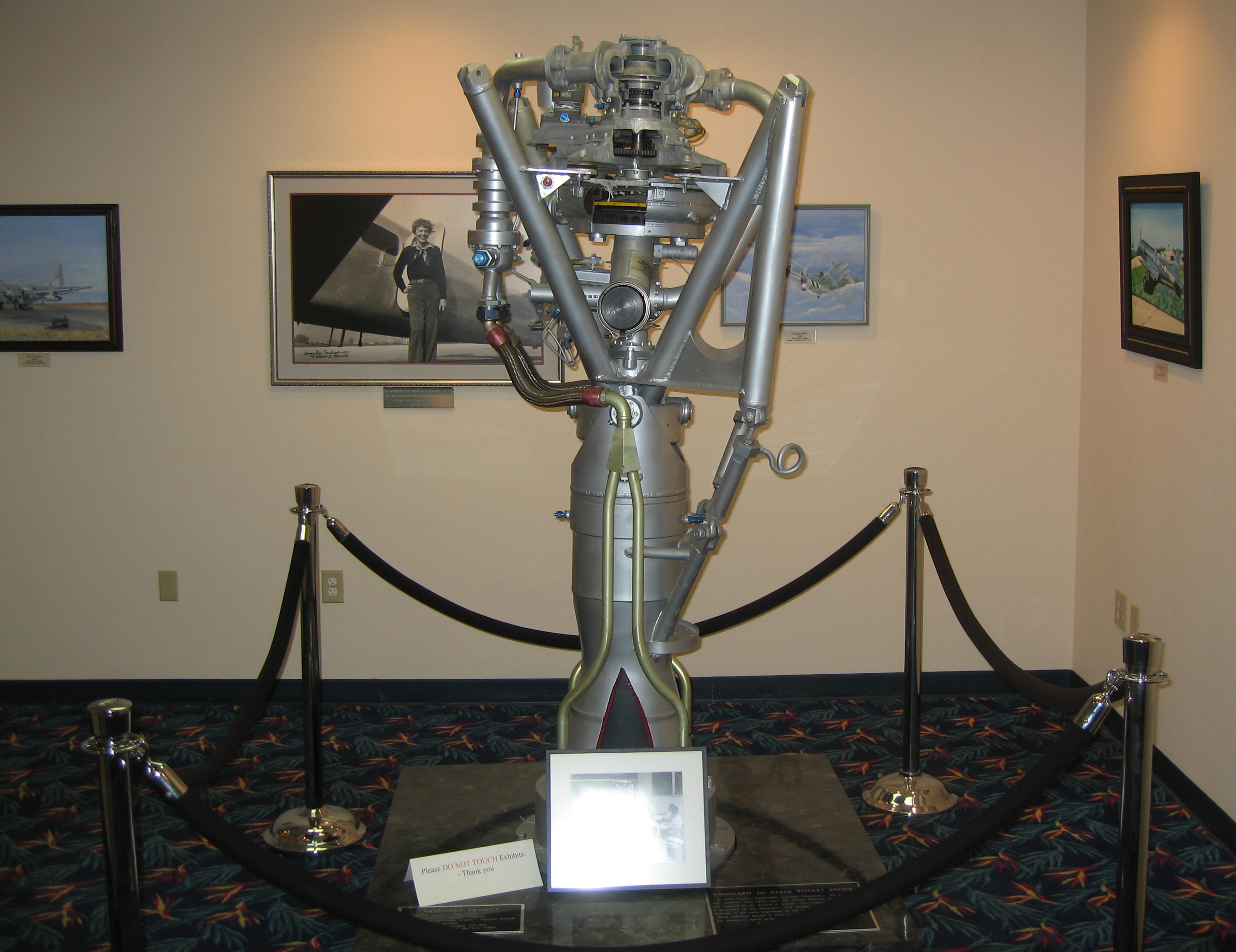
Exhibit of a Vanguard 1st Stage Rocket Engine
