= Jerome P. Keuper =

Physicist

Jerome "Jerry" P. Keuper (1921–2002) was a physicist and the founder and first president of Brevard Engineering College (later the Florida Institute of Technology), and served in the position from 1958 to 1986.

== Early life ==
Keuper was born in Fort Thomas, Kentucky in 1921. He joined the United States Army and served mostly in China and Burma during World War II as an intelligence officer in the Office of Strategic Services (OSS). Keuper earned a bachelor's degree from Massachusetts Institute of Technology, a master's from Stanford University and a doctorate from the University of Virginia.

He was an MG car enthusiast and is credited with bringing the MG Car Club Florida to Brevard County.

== Career ==
He joined the Systems Analysis Group of RCA in the early days of the Space Race, and moved to Brevard County, Florida.

Keuper started the Brevard Engineering college in 1958 utilizing junior high school classrooms rented from the Brevard County School District. He did this as there was a need in the area to supply engineers to Kennedy Space Center for the growing U.S. space program.

When the school board found out that a black student had been admitted in 1959, they ended their arrangement with Keuper. He then relocated his school to a local church until he had obtained enough private funding to build his own campus.

Throughout his life he also served as chairman of the Council of Presidents of the State Board of Independent Colleges and Universities; director of the Federal Reserve Bank of Atlanta, Jacksonville Branch; president of the International Palm Society, and advisory board member for both the National Energy Foundation and the Institute of International Education.

Keuper had several of his books published and included topics such as idiomatic expressions in Mandarin Chinese and Spanish.

== Awards ==
In 1995, Keuper was inducted into the Brevard County Business Hall of Fame

== Death ==
He died on March 25, 2002, in Brevard County, Florida of congestive heart failure at age 81. His statue stands on the FIT campus in the original academic quad.
