= Naval Air Station Melbourne =

Coordinates: 28°06′04″N 80°37′56″W

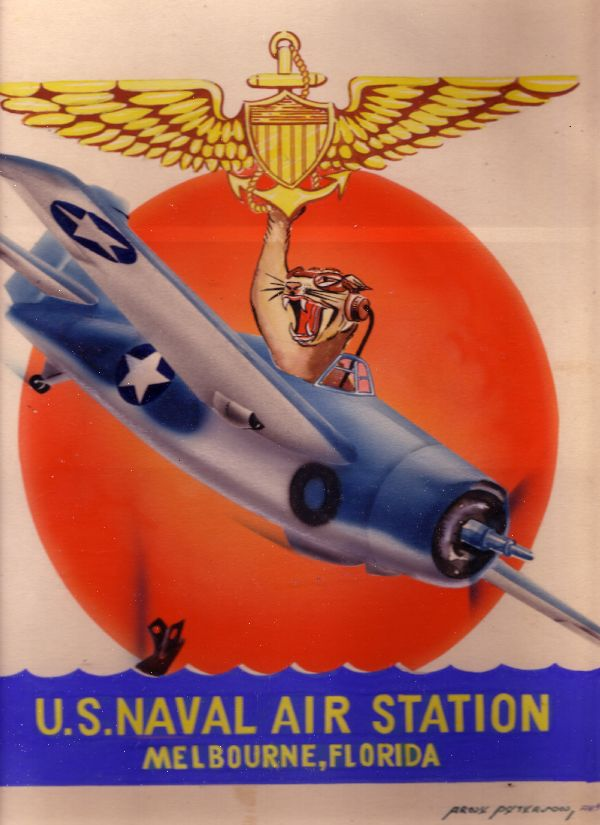
- Active: 1942-1946
- Country: United States
- Allegiance: United States of America
- Branch: United States Navy
- Type: Naval Air Station
- Role: Pilot Training
- Size: Airfield & 129 Buildings

Commanders
- Current commander: Inactive

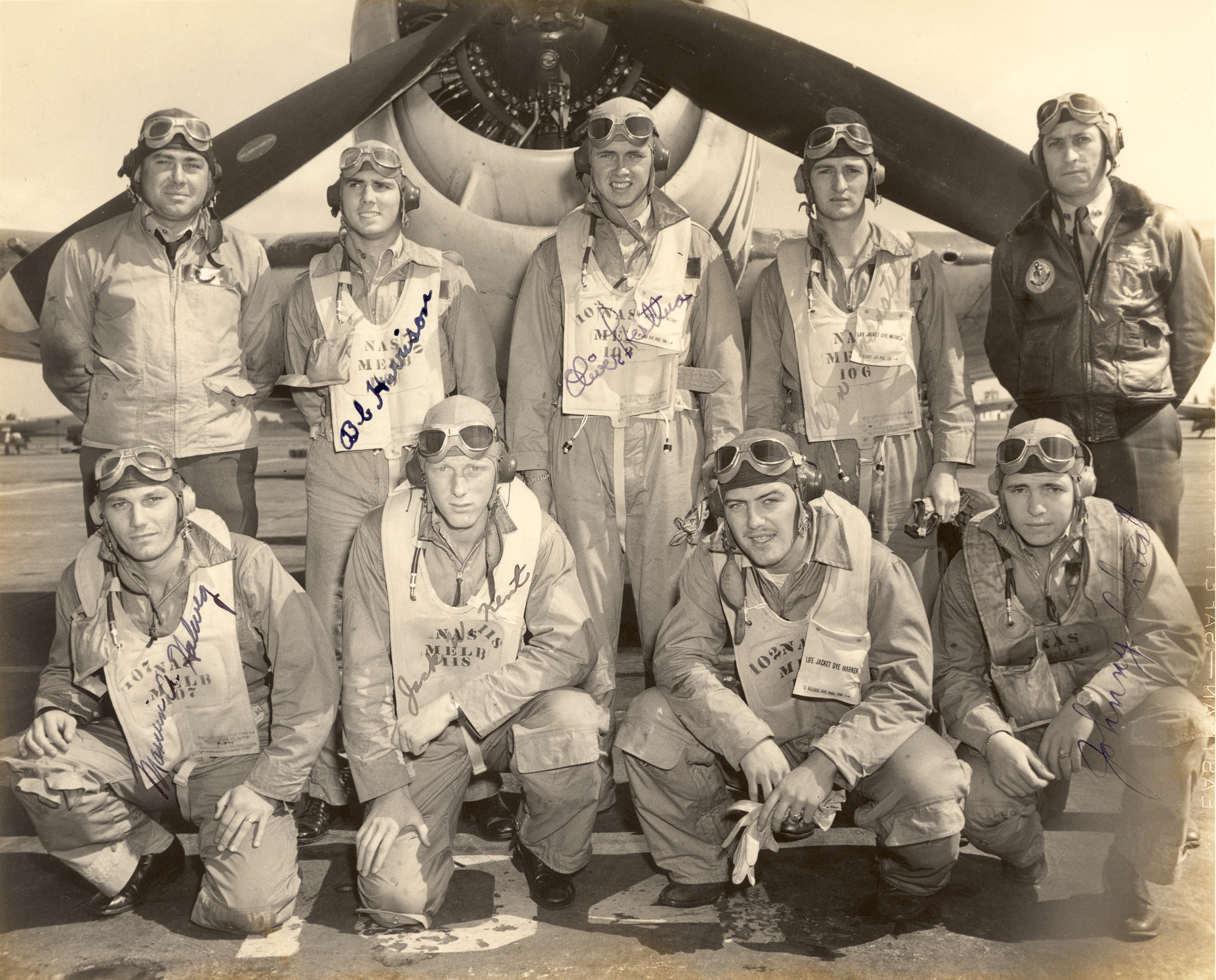
NAS Melbourne Flight 143

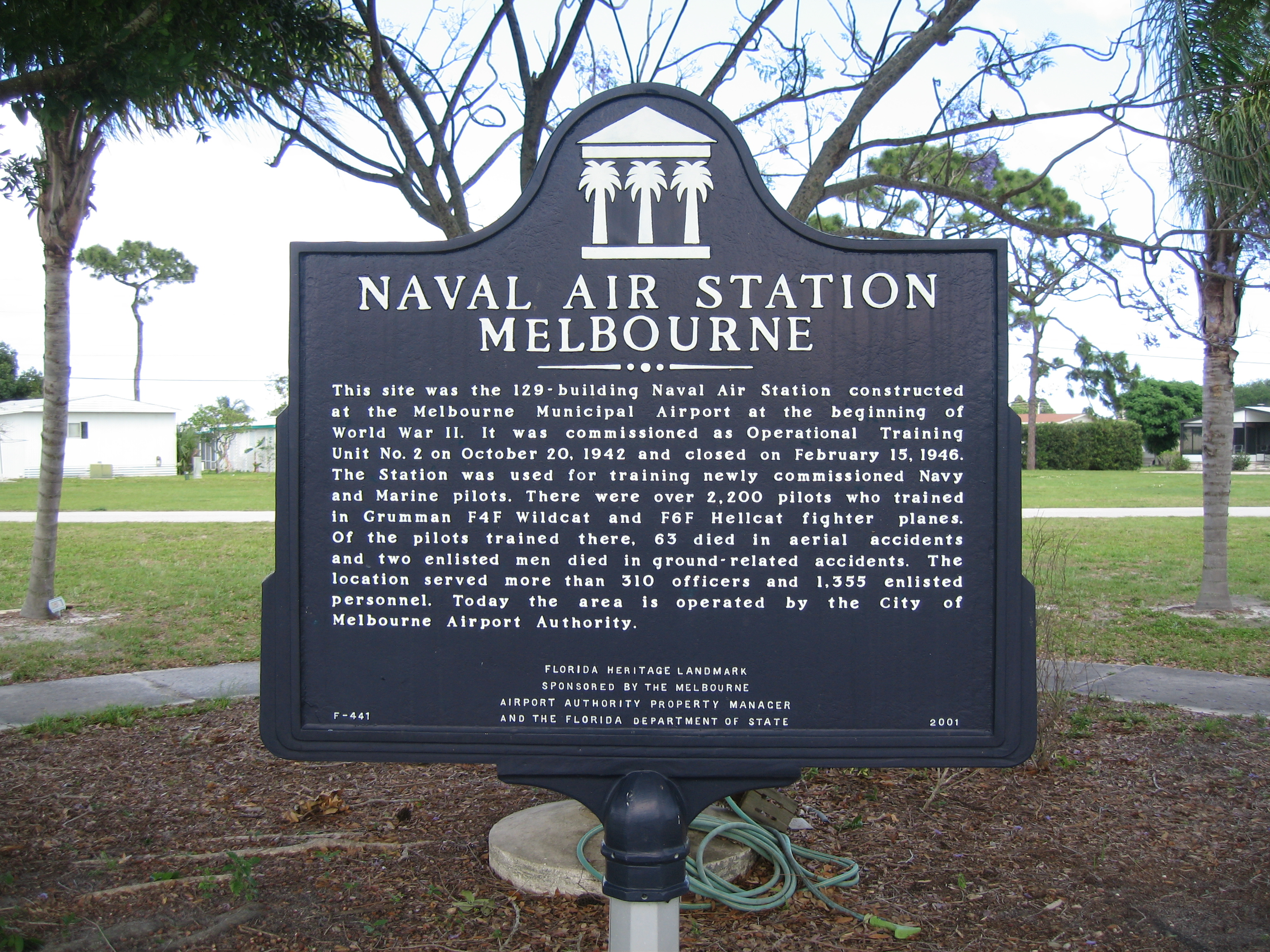
NAS Melbourne Historical marker

Naval Air Station (NAS) Melbourne was a United States Naval Base in Melbourne, Florida. The Navy used NAS Melbourne for gunnery training for pilots of carrier-based fighter aircraft and as a base for WAVES during World War II. While operational, over 2,200 U.S. Navy and U.S. Marine Corps Naval Aviators trained in Grumman F4F Wildcats and F6F Hellcats at NAS Melbourne.

== History ==
The Navy constructed NAS Melbourne at the Melbourne Municipal Airport at the beginning of World War II and commissioned it on October 20, 1942 as Operational Training Unit No. 2. The Navy closed the site on February 12, 1946 and returned it to the City of Melbourne as surplus property in 1947. Currently, the City of Melbourne Airport Authority operates the site as the Melbourne Orlando International Airport.

As an active military base, Naval Air Station Melbourne contained 129 buildings and served more than 310 officers and 1,355 enlisted personnel of the U.S. Navy and U.S. Marine Corps. During the station's operation, 63 personnel died in aerial accidents and two enlisted men died in ground-related accidents.

The station published two newspapers, starting with the Melbourne Wildcat from 1943–44, which was replaced by the Melbourne Hellcat from 1944–46

As of 2019, the worst aircraft accident ever recorded in South Brevard County occurred on March 26, 1944. A U.S. Army Air Forces B-24E bomber from Chatham Field in Savannah, Georgia, suffering from multiple engine failures, crashed near Eau Gallie while attempting an emergency nighttime landing at the Naval Air Station. Ten airmen were killed. The co-pilot, 2nd Lt Basil R. Huntress, was the only survivor. Due to the severity of his injuries, he was medically retired from the military.

== See also ==
- Airport Museum at Melbourne International Airport
- Accidents and incidents involving the Consolidated B-24 Liberator, March 26, 1944
