= Manatee County Agricultural Museum =

Coordinates: 27°30′59″N 82°34′35″W

The Manatee County Agricultural Museum is located at 1015 6th Street West, Palmetto, Florida 34221. It is open Tuesday–Friday 10:00–12:00 and 1:00–4:00 as well as the first and third Saturdays of the month.

Agriculture has always been part of Manatee County’s history as well as a stable force and a major contributor to the county's economy. At the Manatee County Agricultural Museum, exhibits focus on the county's primary commodities including Livestock, Vegetables, Citrus, Horticulture, and Commercial Fishing. The museum features displays of tools, equipment, photographs and exhibits that reflect the area's rich heritage. The Manatee County Agricultural Museum is a joint project of the Manatee County Agricultural Museum Board, Manatee County Clerk of Circuit Court, the Manatee County Board of County Commission, and the City of Palmetto.

The museum is located within the Palmetto Historical Park.
