= Palmetto Historical Park =

Coordinates: 27.516°N 82.576°W

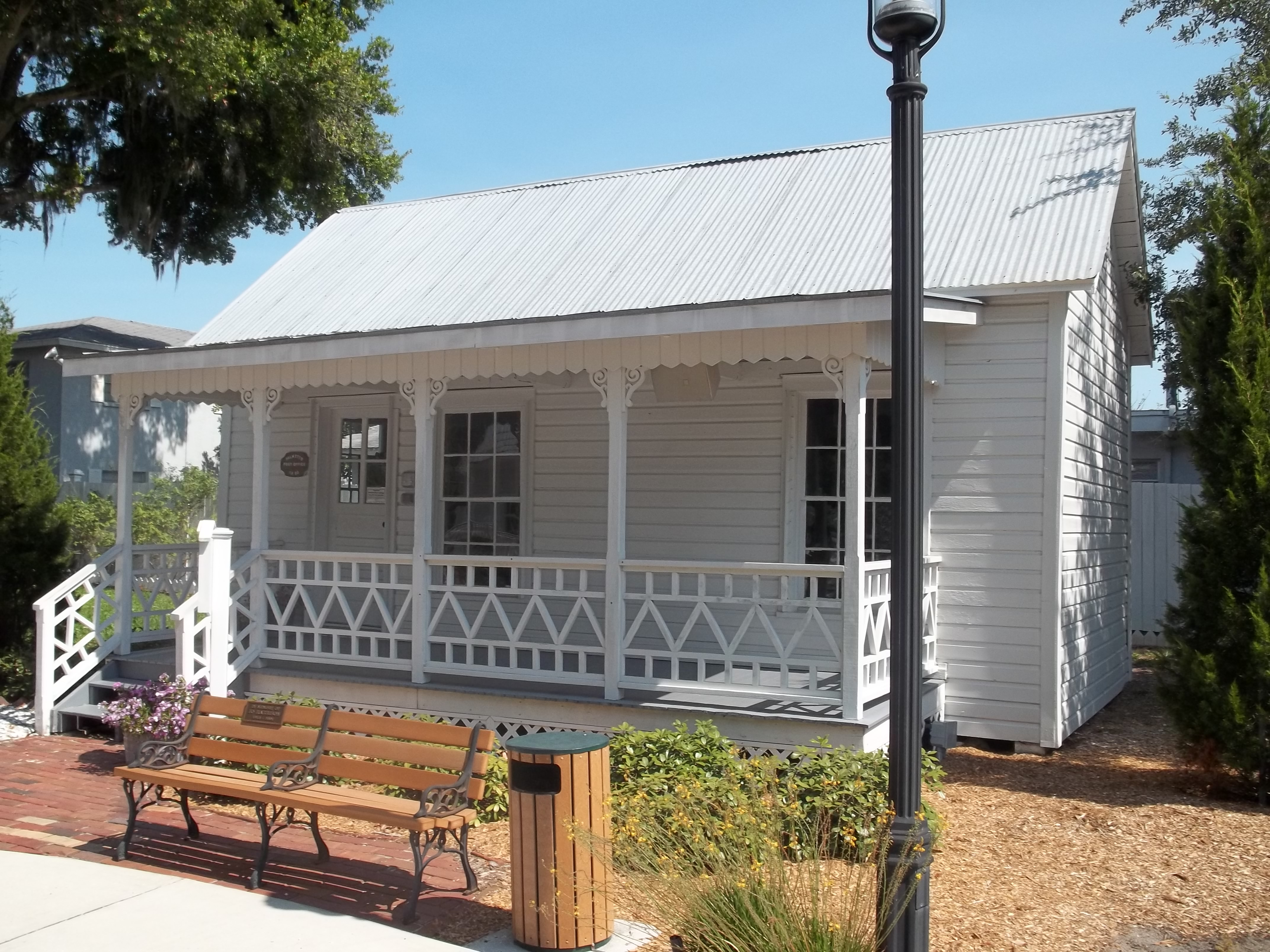
Historic post office

Palmetto Historical Park is located in the heart of Palmetto Historic District in Palmetto, Florida, Manatee County, Florida. This site is the original location of Palmetto's first city hall and school building. The Park includes Palmetto's first Post Office (1880), a cottage museum, a historic one room schoolhouse, a small military museum and a reproduction chapel representative of area churches. There is also a chapel, Military Museum and the 1914 Carnegie Library. Palmetto Historical Park is operated by the Palmetto Historical Commission, Manatee County Clerk of Circuit Court, the Manatee County Board of County Commission, and the City of Palmetto. The Manatee County Agricultural Museum next door is housed in a building formerly housing Palmetto's police, fire and maintenance personnel.

== History ==
Efforts to acquire and preserve historic buildings in Palmetto began in 1982, when the first members of the Palmetto Historical Commission worked to save the city's original post office from demolition. Their efforts were successful and resulted in the 1880 post office being moved to its present location behind the 1914 Carnegie Library, where it was lovingly restored. The Commission then undertook a historical survey of Palmetto and the adjoining areas, eventually documenting over 350 sites with “redeeming value.”

== Historic buildings ==
From the 1980s until 2003, the Park has expanded with the addition of more historical buildings. Today, the Park includes:

=== 1914 Carnegie Library ===
One of the first libraries built in South Florida, the library was funded using a $10,000 grant from Andrew Carnegie. The City of Palmetto donated the land. Because the Carnegie Foundation required that every library have a basement, the second floor is the main floor accessible by stairs up to the front entrance, and the first floor is the “basement.” Local genealogists or hobby researchers can visit The Alice V. Myers Archives Center, a collection of thousands of unique historical documents pertaining to the community's history. The Archives Center includes family histories, biographies, historical photographs, and records from local businesses and community organizations.

=== 1936 Schoolhouse ===
The area's first public kindergarten.

=== Replica chapel ===
The only unoriginal building in the Park, it is based on the designs of the first three churches in Palmetto. After searching for an original chapel, it was decided in 1999 to build a replica Chapel at approximately the same size and interior décor as the original churches.

=== 1900 Cottage Museum ===
A typical pioneer family home, it resembles many of the small bungalows built across Florida in the early part of the 20th century.

=== 1880 Heritage Station Post Office ===
Palmetto's first free-standing post office. For one day each year on Heritage Day, it is opened for business. Visitors can have their mail hand stamped using a special cancellation used only on that day at this place.

=== 1930s Cypress House Military Museum ===
Originally located on Longboat Key, it was one of several cypress cottages used during WWII to house military personnel who brought their families to the beach for an extended vacation.

== Community programs ==
The park also has created several creative, hands-on programs designed to educate local children and adults about early Florida history.

=== Annual Heritage Festival ===
Each year on the second Saturday in March, the park hosts its annual Heritage Festival featuring many local cultural groups.

=== Traveling Trunk ===
Called “a field trip in a box,” this is a large steamer trunk with can be rented out for classrooms or groups of history enthusiasts. Inside are activities and props teaching about pioneer chores, including: laundry, housekeeping, chopping firewood, churning butter, and letter writing.

=== History To-Go kits ===
Each with its own corresponding YouTube video featuring park staff. Examples include: Slate & chalk with a Schoolhouse Virtual Field Trip, Old fashioned pen & ink with a video lesson to write like the pioneers, and other storytime craft kits for younger visitors.

== Community partnerships ==
Palmetto Historical Park operates under an agreement between four local entities: The City of Palmetto, the Manatee County Clerk of the Circuit Court & Comptroller, the Manatee County Agricultural Museum, and the Palmetto Historical Commission. The park maintains an especially close partnership with the Palmetto Historical Commission, whose offices are located within the Carnegie Library. It also works closely with several local and state genealogical or historical groups.

== Gallery ==
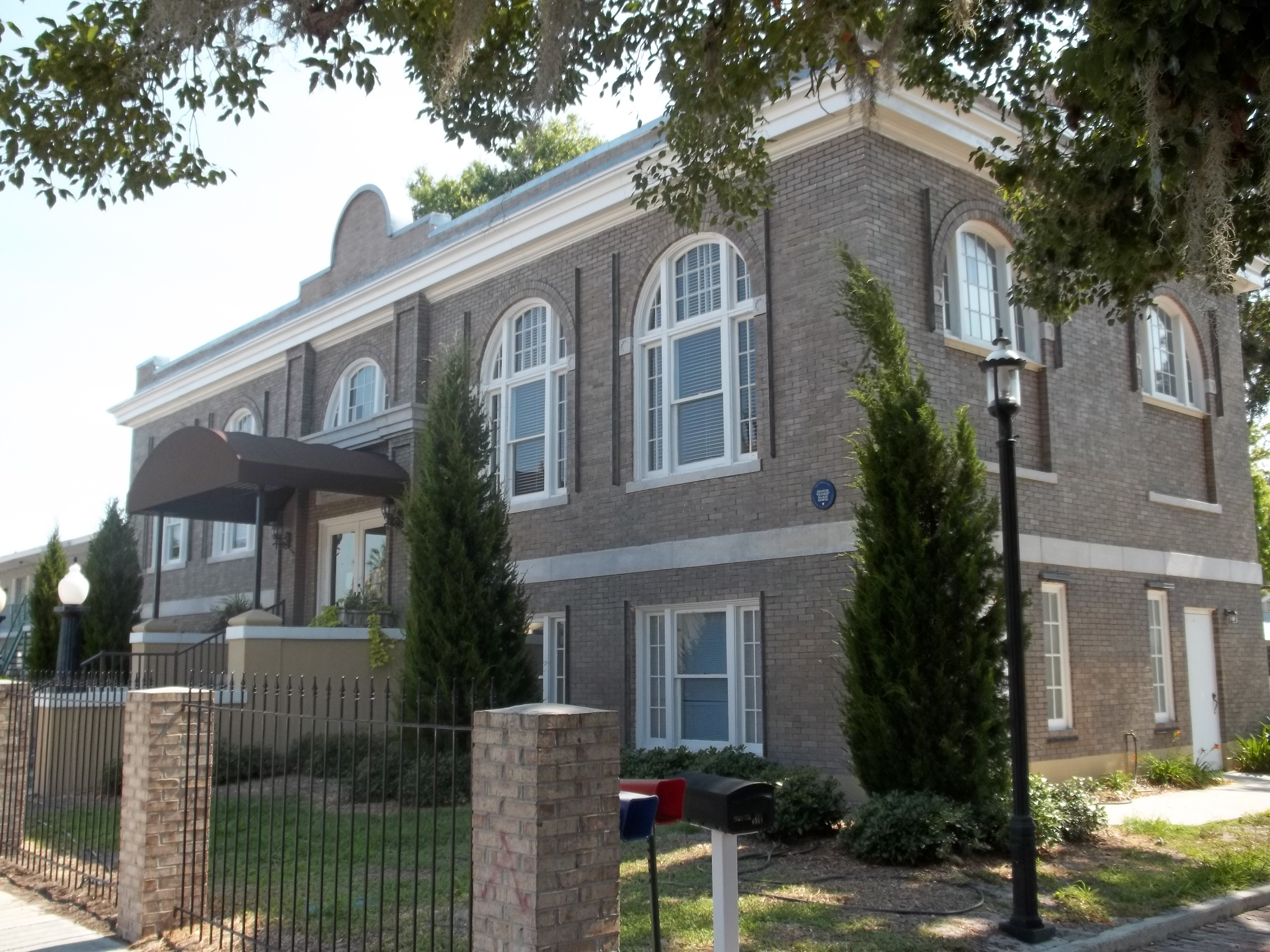
Palmetto's Carnegie Library

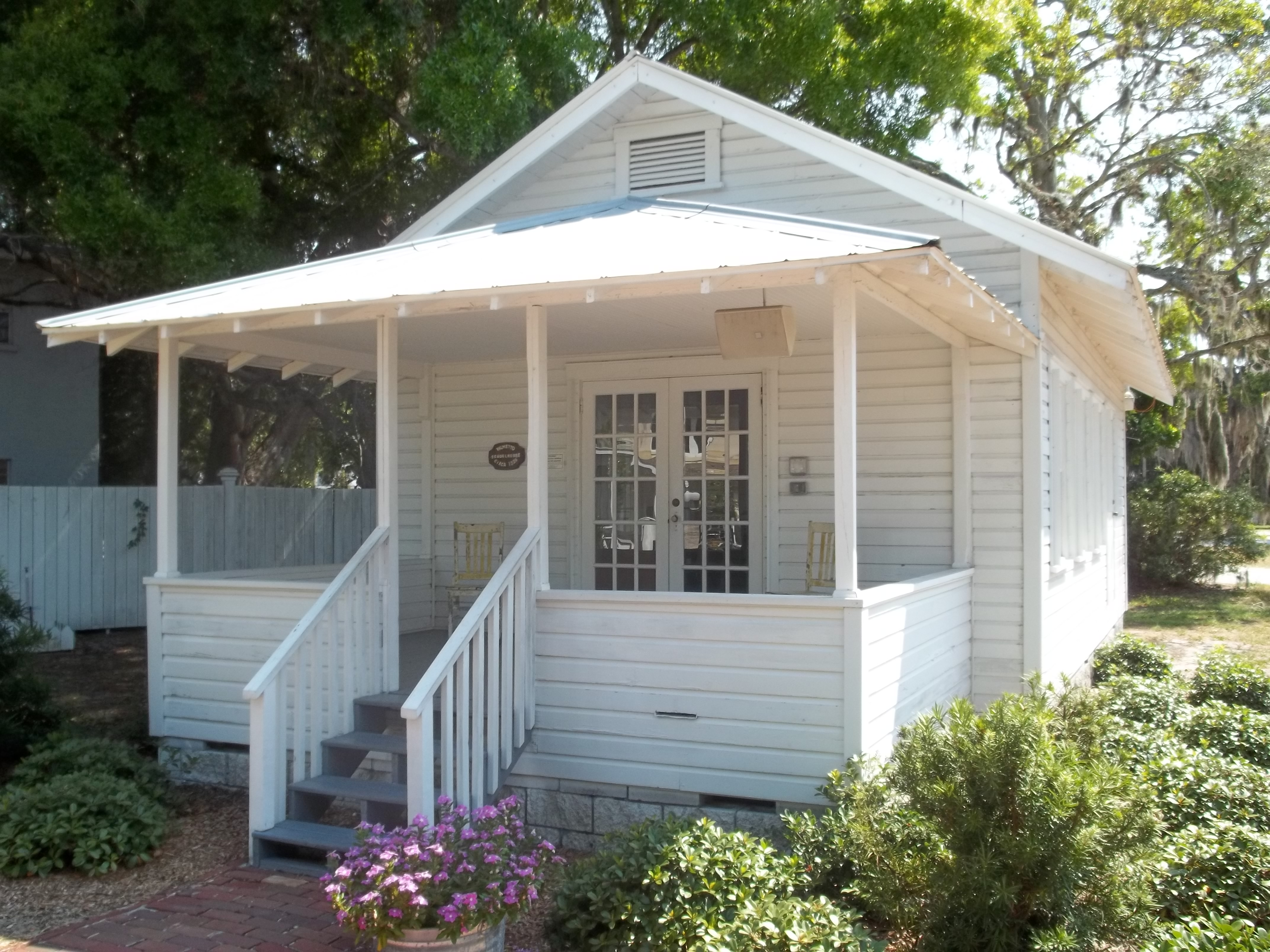
Schoolhouse

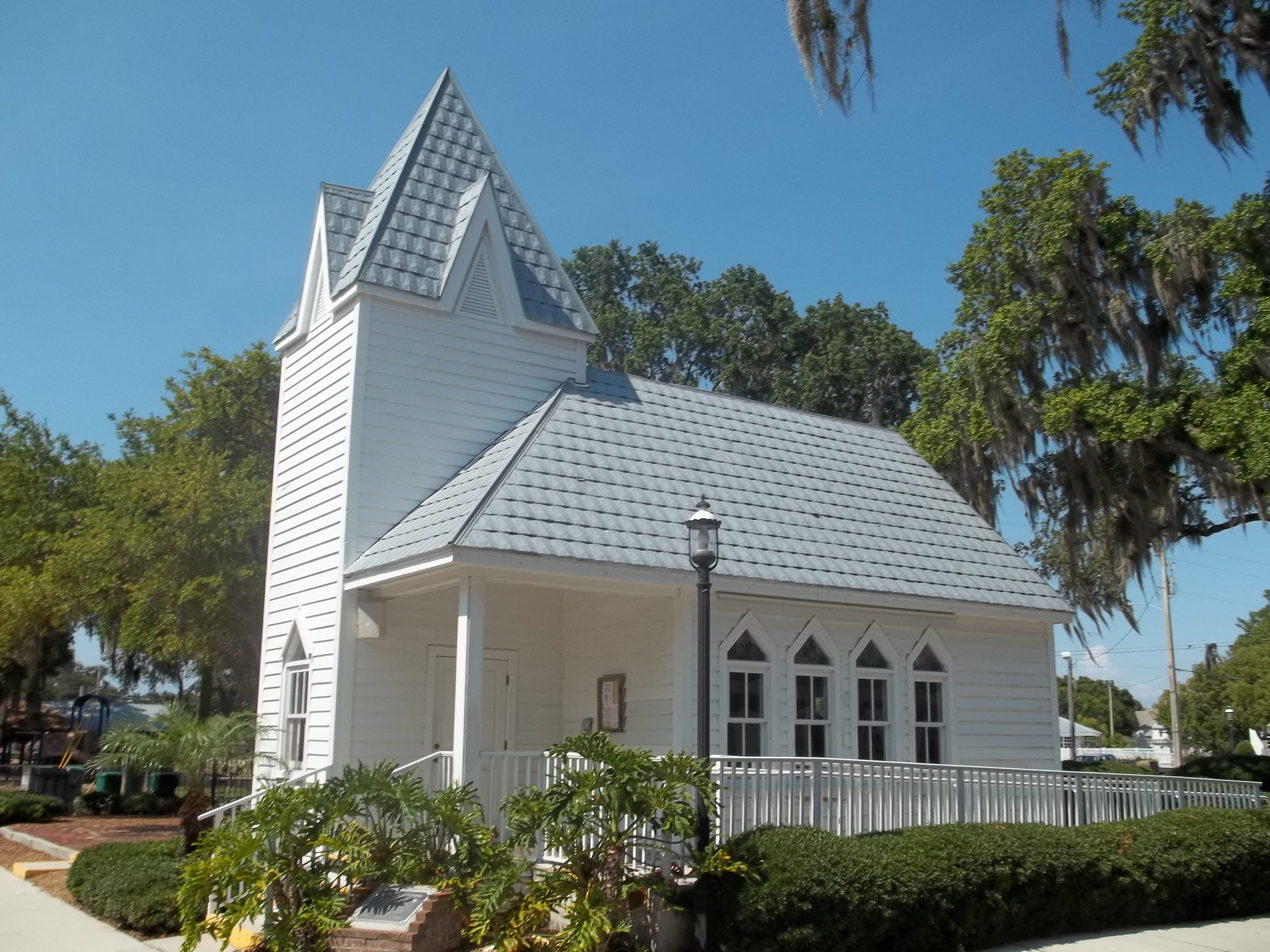
Chapel

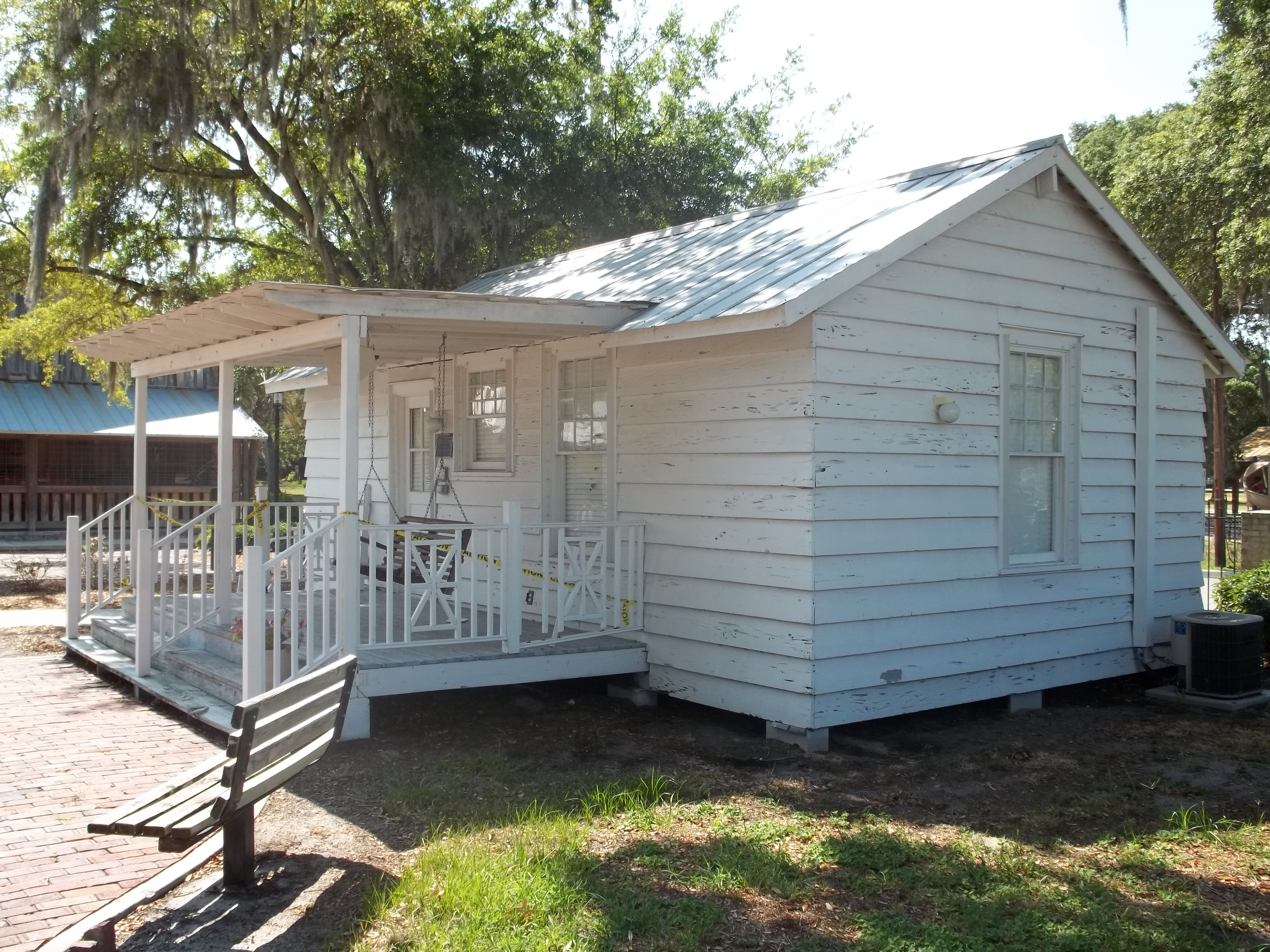
Cypress House

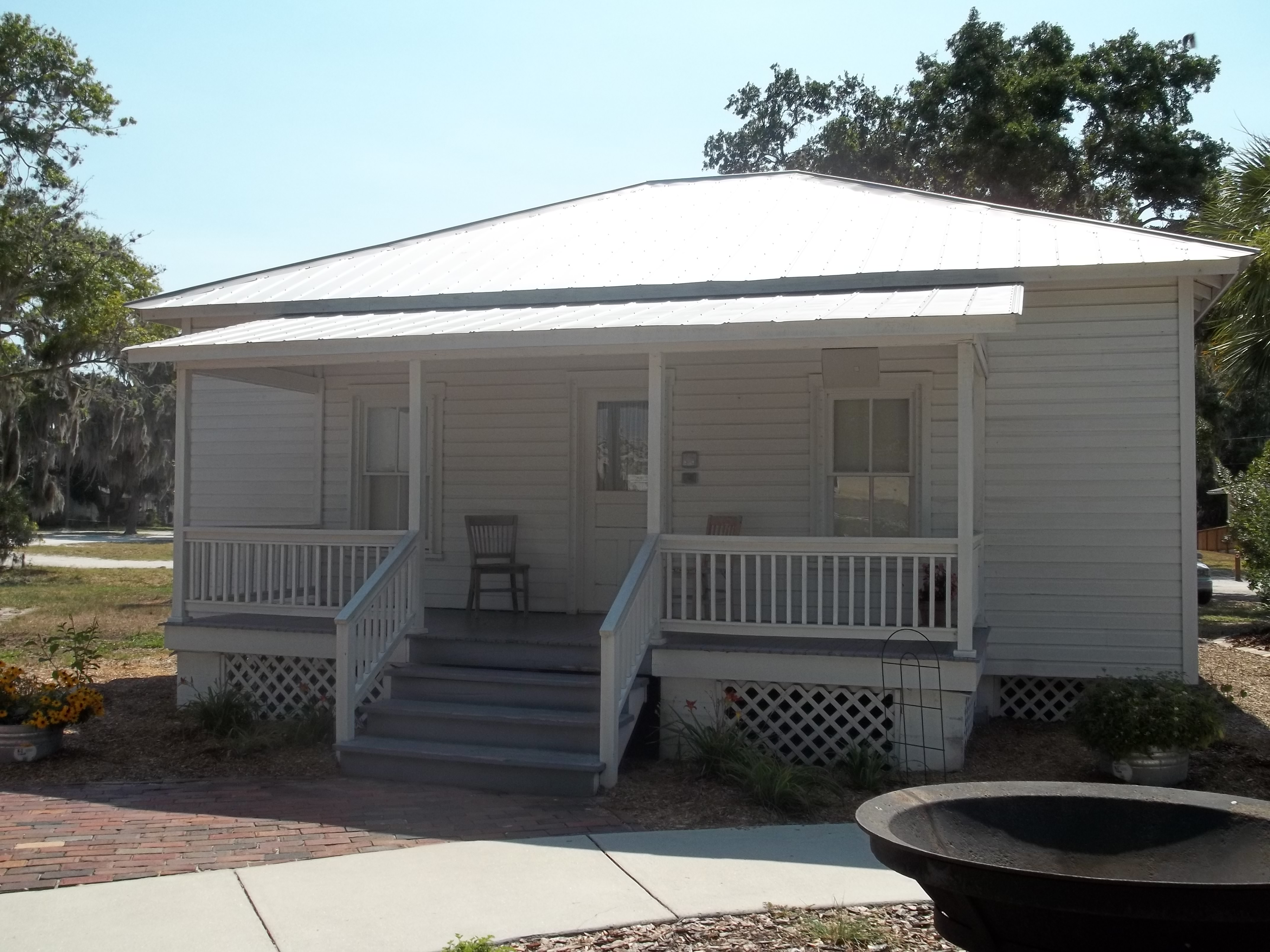
Cottage Museum

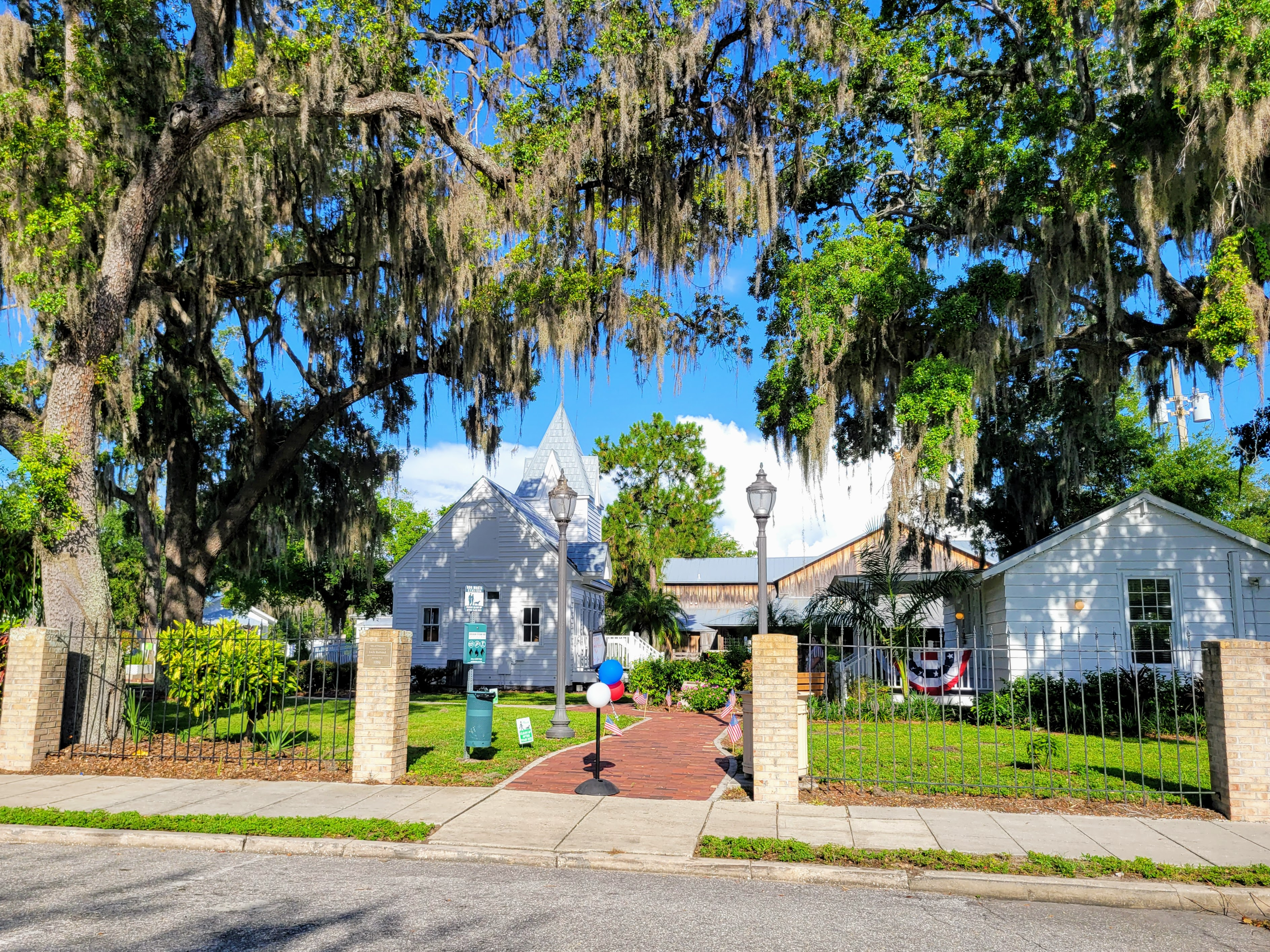
Park as viewed from 10th Avenue West.

== See also ==
- List of museums in Florida
