= Orange County, Florida =

County in Florida, United States

Orange County
- County
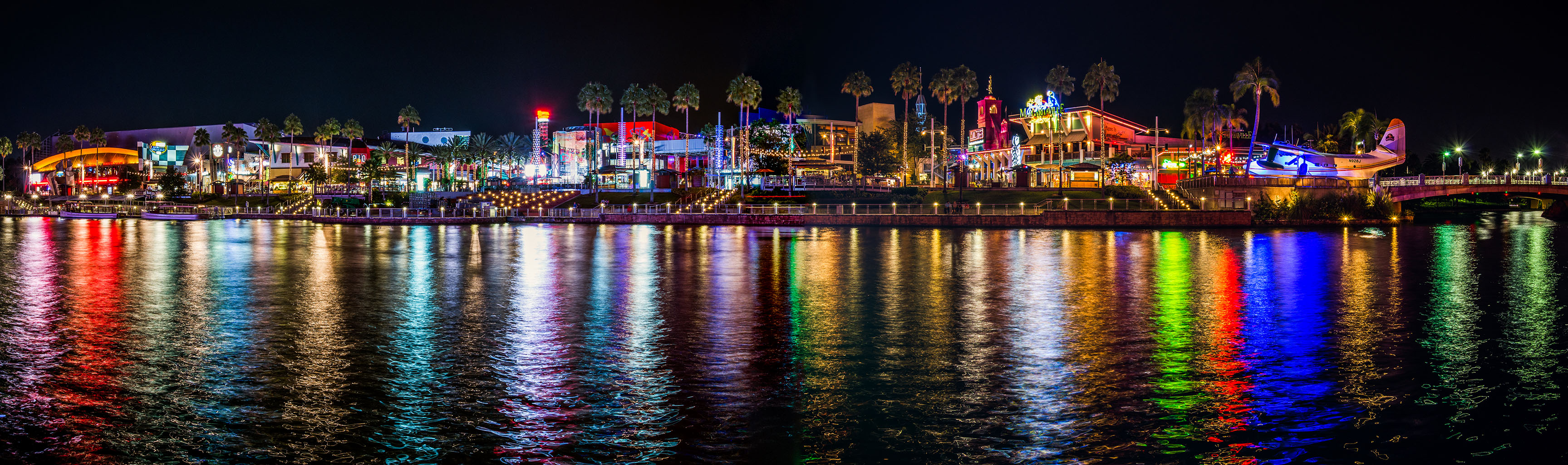
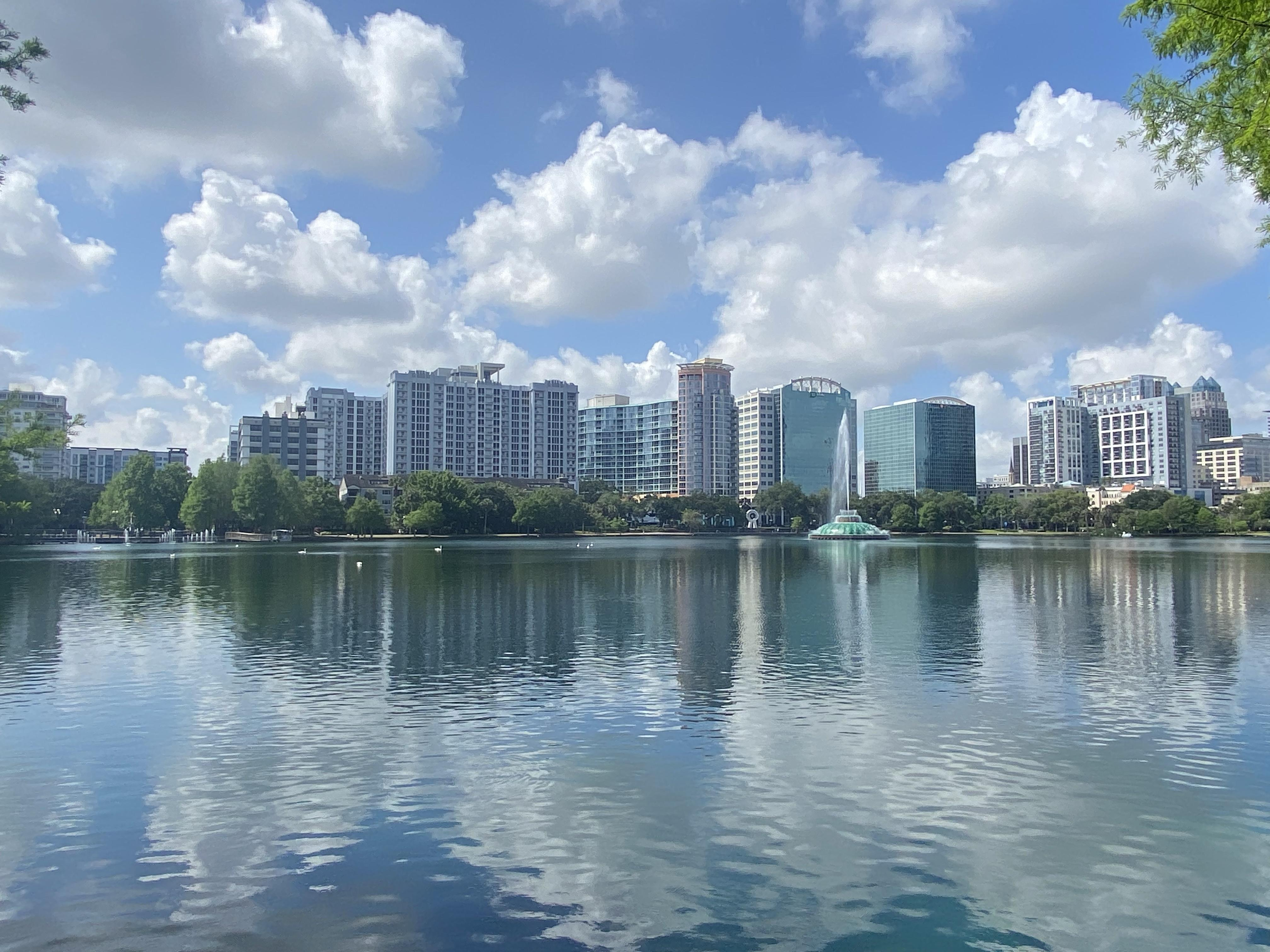
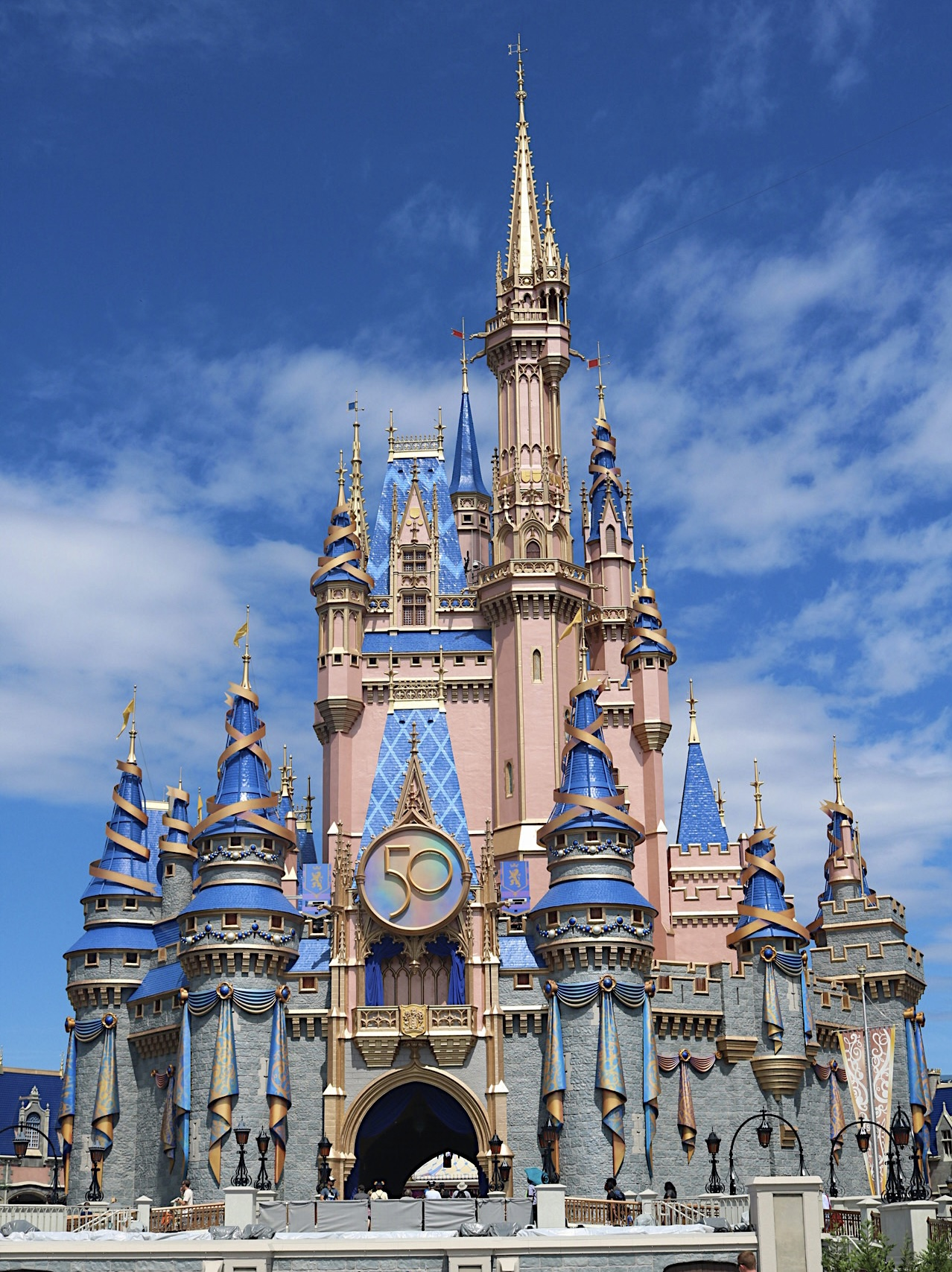
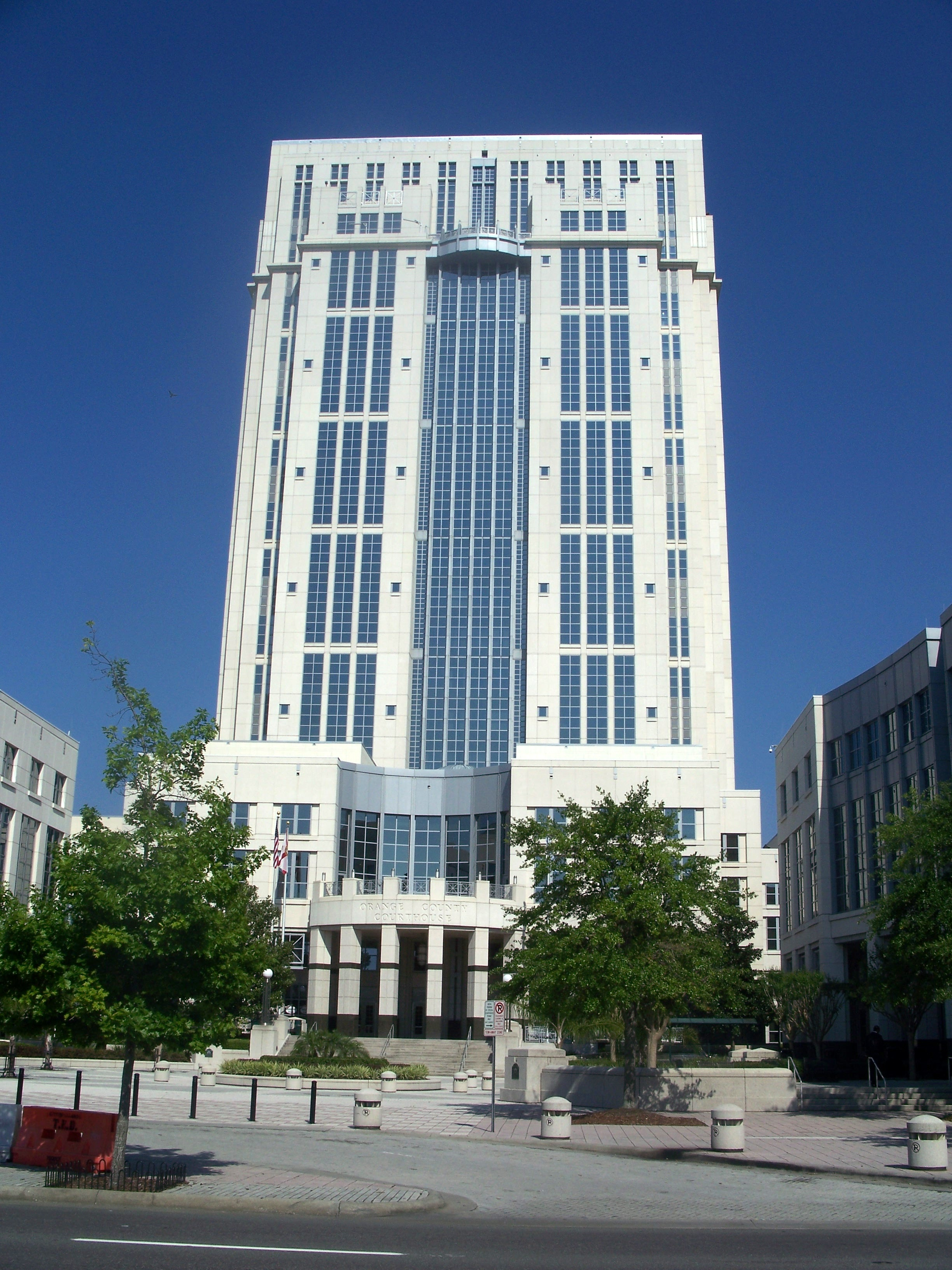
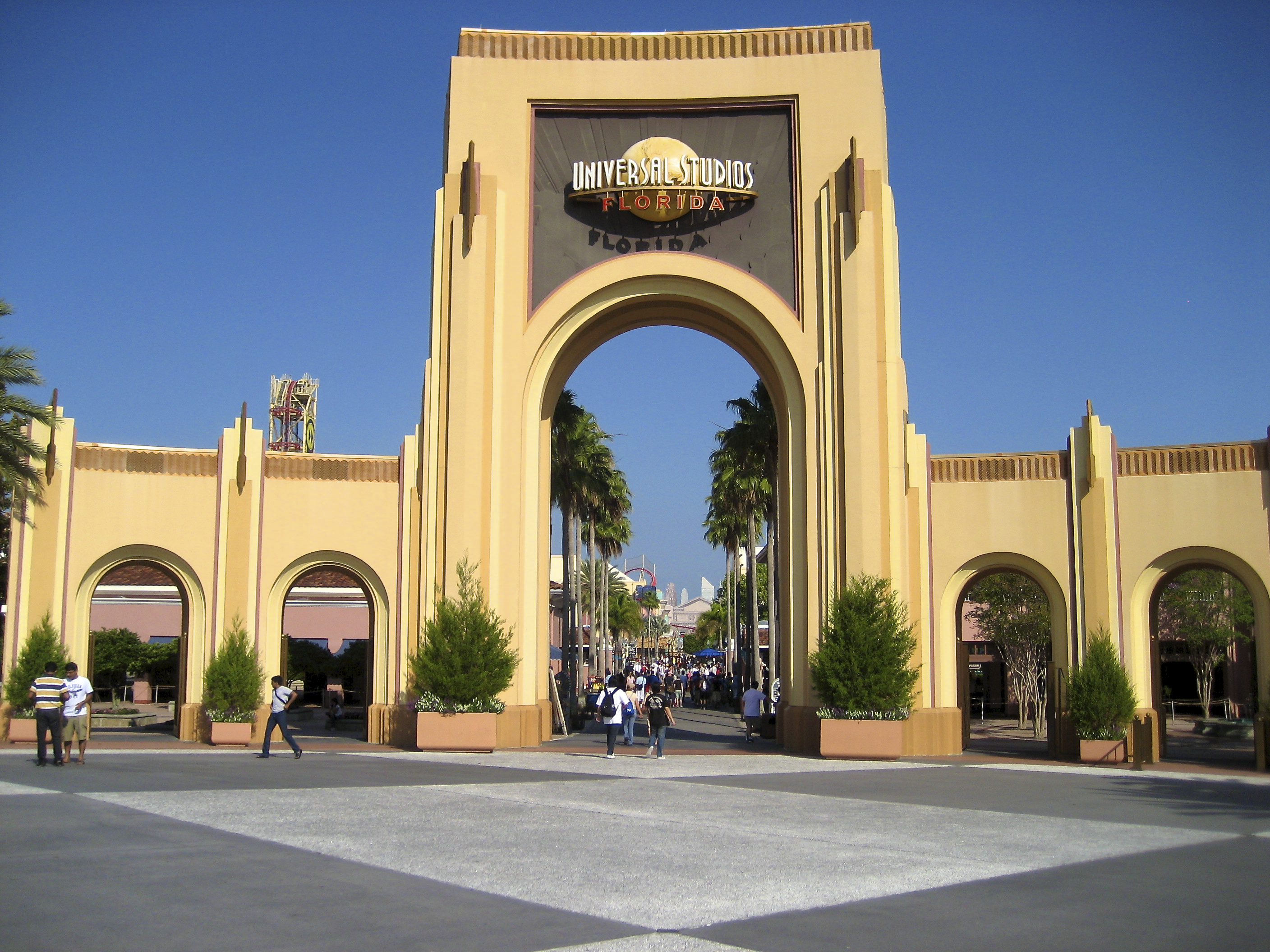
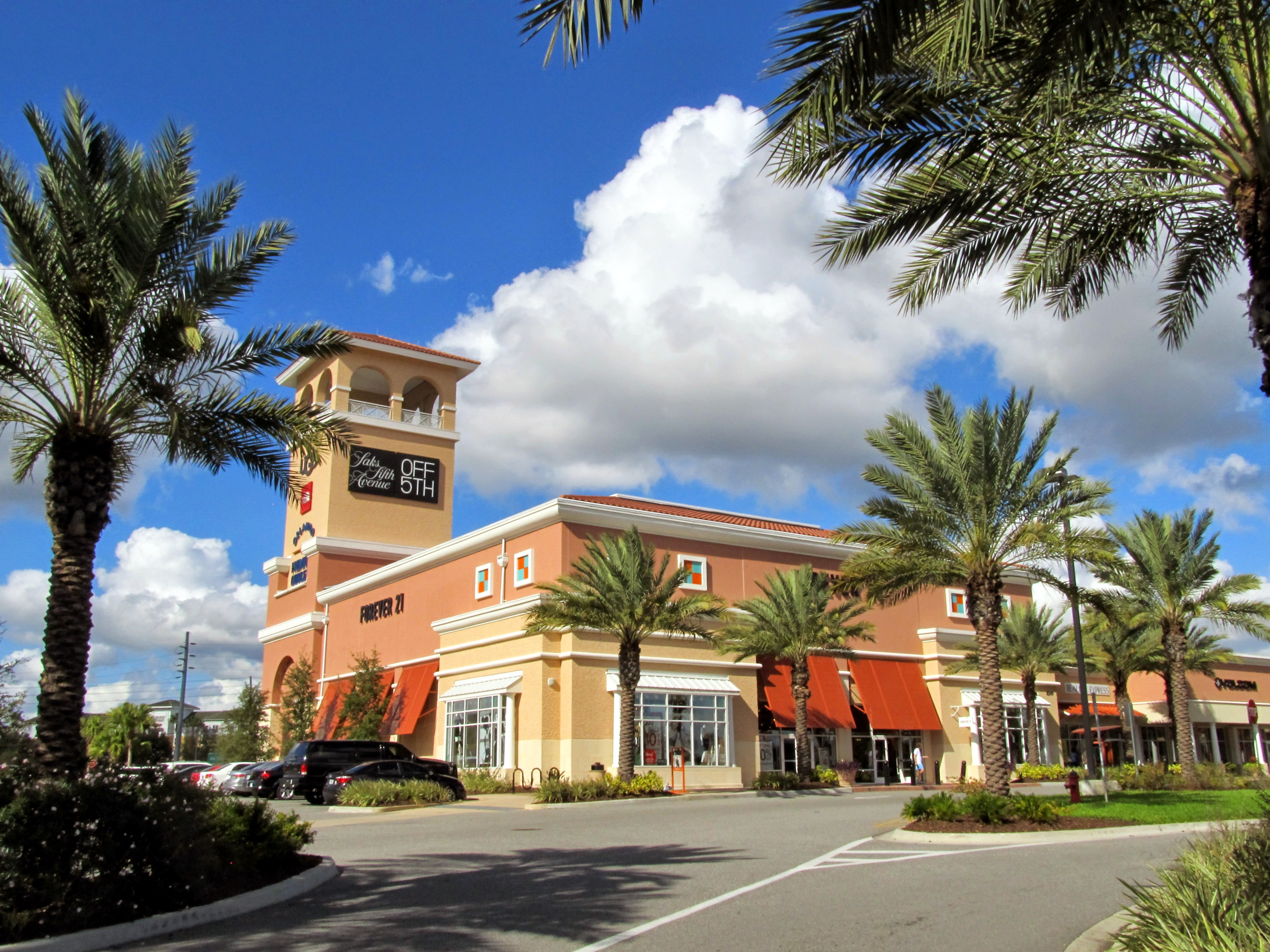
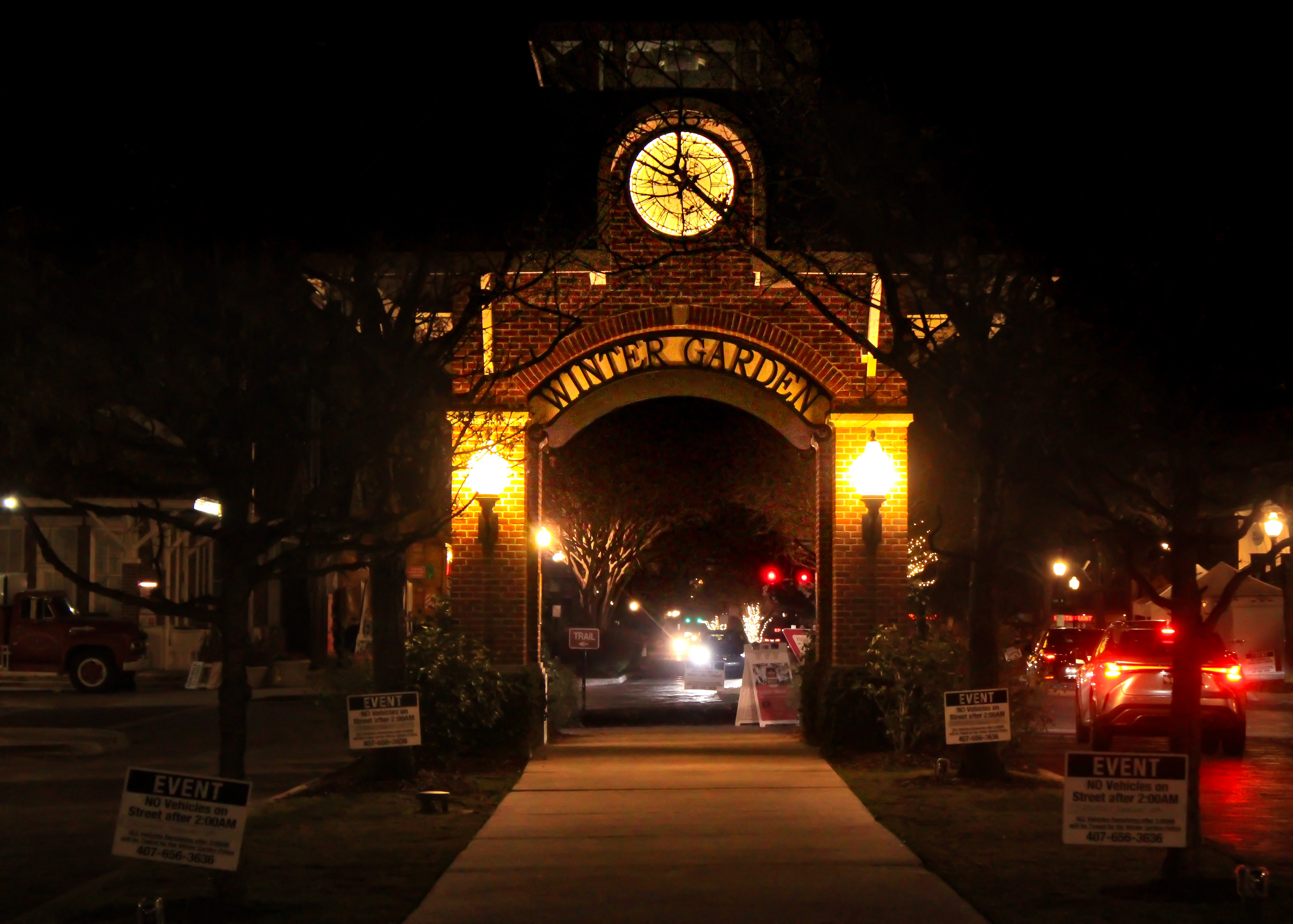
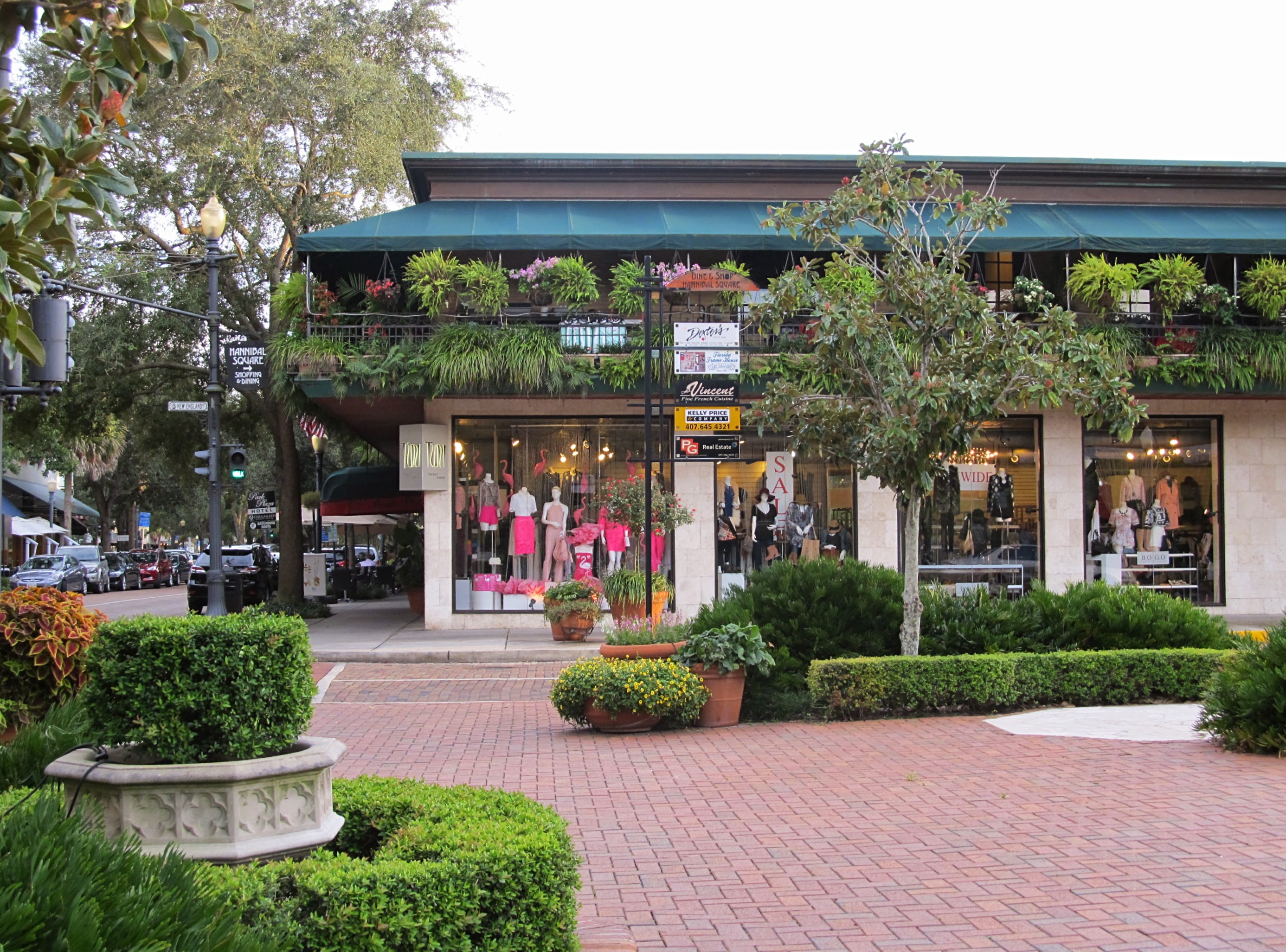
- Left to right from top down: Universal CityWalk; Lake Eola; Cinderella Castle at Magic Kingdom; Orange County Courthouse in Downtown Orlando; Universal Studios Florida; Orlando International Premium Outlets; Downtown Winter Garden; and Downtown Winter Park

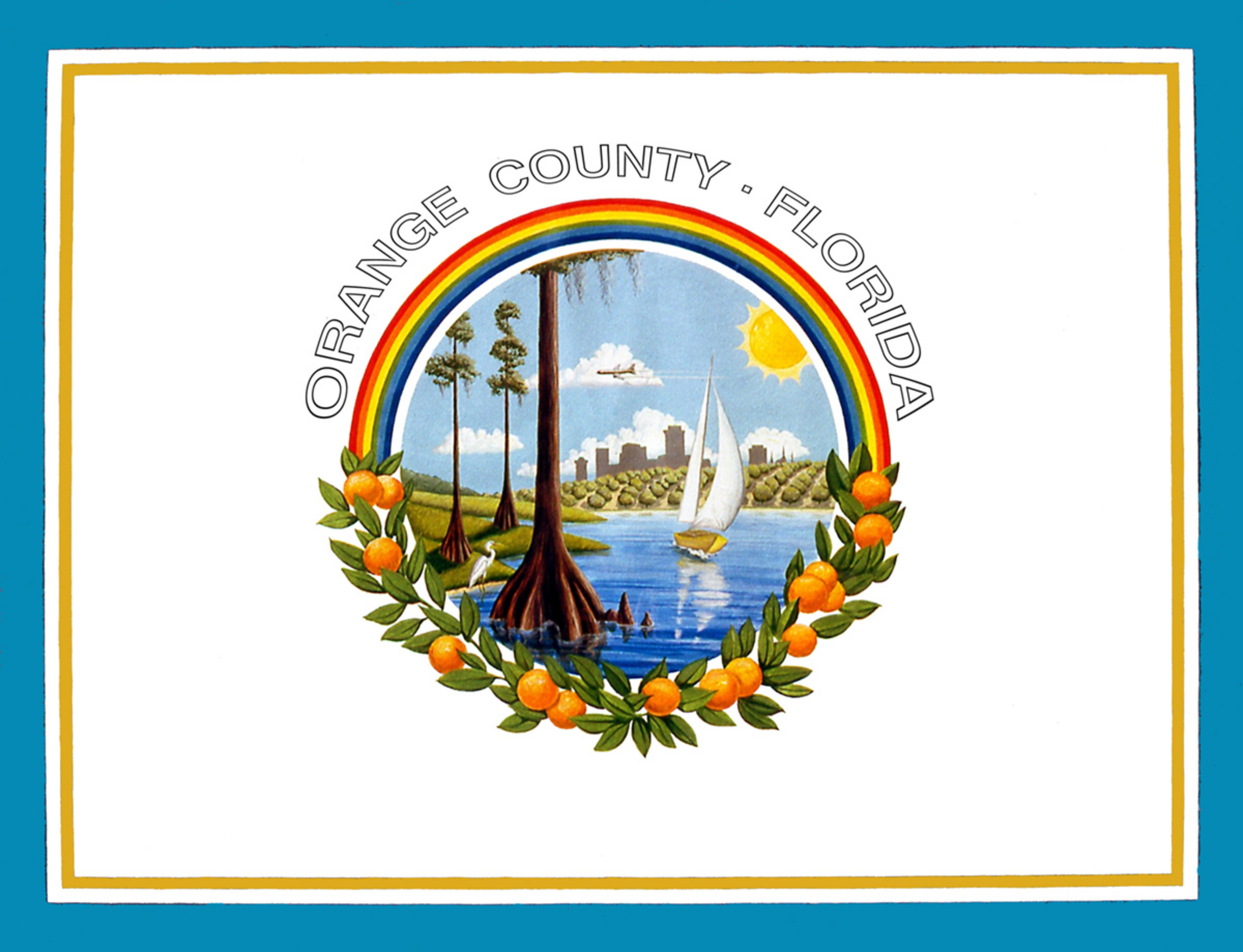
- Flag Seal Logo

- Location within the United States
- Coordinates: 28°31′N 81°19′W
- Country: United States
- Founded: December 29, 1824 (renamed January 30, 1845)
- Named for: For the citrus orange fruit that once thrived in the area
- County seat: Orlando
- Largest city: Orlando

Government
  - Type: Mayor–commission
  - Body: Orange County Board of County Commissioners
  - Mayor: Jerry Demings (D) (Note: The Mayor of Orange County is officially elected in a non-partisan election, despite common de facto party affiliation.)

Area
  - Total: 1,003 sq mi (2,600 km^{2})
  - Land: 903 sq mi (2,340 km^{2})
  - Water: 100 sq mi (260 km^{2})

Population (2020)
  - Total: 1,429,908
  - Estimate (2025): 1,528,002 ▲
  - Rank: 28th in the United States; 5th in Florida
  - Density: 1,580/sq mi (611/km^{2})

GDP
  - Total: $160.400 billion (2024)
- Time zone: UTC−5 (Eastern Time Zone)
  - Summer (DST): UTC−4 (Eastern Daylight Time)
- ZIP Codes: 32828, 32703, 32712, 32820, 32709, 34734, 34786, 32810, 32751, 32824, 34760, 34761, 32835, 32836, 32837, 32839, 32825, 32821, 32822, 32829, 32830, 32831, 32832, 32801, 32803, 32804, 32805, 32806, 32807, 32811, 32812, 32814, 32817, 32819, 32827, 32809, 32818, 32808, 32826, 32833, 34787, 32789, 32792, 32798
- Area codes: 407, 689, 321
- FIPS code: 12095
- GNIS feature ID: 295750
- Website: www.orangecountyfl.net

Orange County is a county located in the central part of the U.S. state of Florida. As of the 2020 census, the county had a population of 1,429,908, making it the fifth-most populous county in Florida and the 28th-most populous county in the United States. Its county seat is Orlando, which, along with it being the county's largest city, is the core of the Orlando metropolitan area, which had a population of 2.67 million in 2020.

As of 2022, Orange County has a gross domestic product of $115 billion, the third-largest GDP of Florida's 67 counties and the 27th-largest for the nation's 3,033 counties. The county is a tourist, economic, and cultural hub for the Central Florida region. Popular destinations within the county include Walt Disney World, Universal Orlando, SeaWorld Orlando, Icon Park, Kia Center, Dr. Phillips Center for the Performing Arts, Orlando Museum of Art, and many other attractions. It is the home to the University of Central Florida (UCF), which as of Fall 2023 had a student population of 69,320, making it the fourth-largest on-campus student body of any public university in the United States. The county is home to other notable colleges, including Rollins College and Valencia College. Despite rapid development countywide, swaths of nature still do exist. There are many lakes within the county, most notable of such being Lake Apopka. Wekiwa Springs is a 7,000-acre (28 km^{2}) state park, that features natural springs, trails, and campsites.

== History ==
The land that is Orange County was part of the first land to come up from below the Early Oligocene sea 33.9–28.4 million years ago and is known as Orange Island. Orange County's Rock Spring location is a Pleistocene fossil-bearing area and has yielded a vast variety of birds and mammals including giant sloth, mammoth, camel, and the dire wolf dating around 1.1 million years ago.

=== 19th century to mid-20th century ===
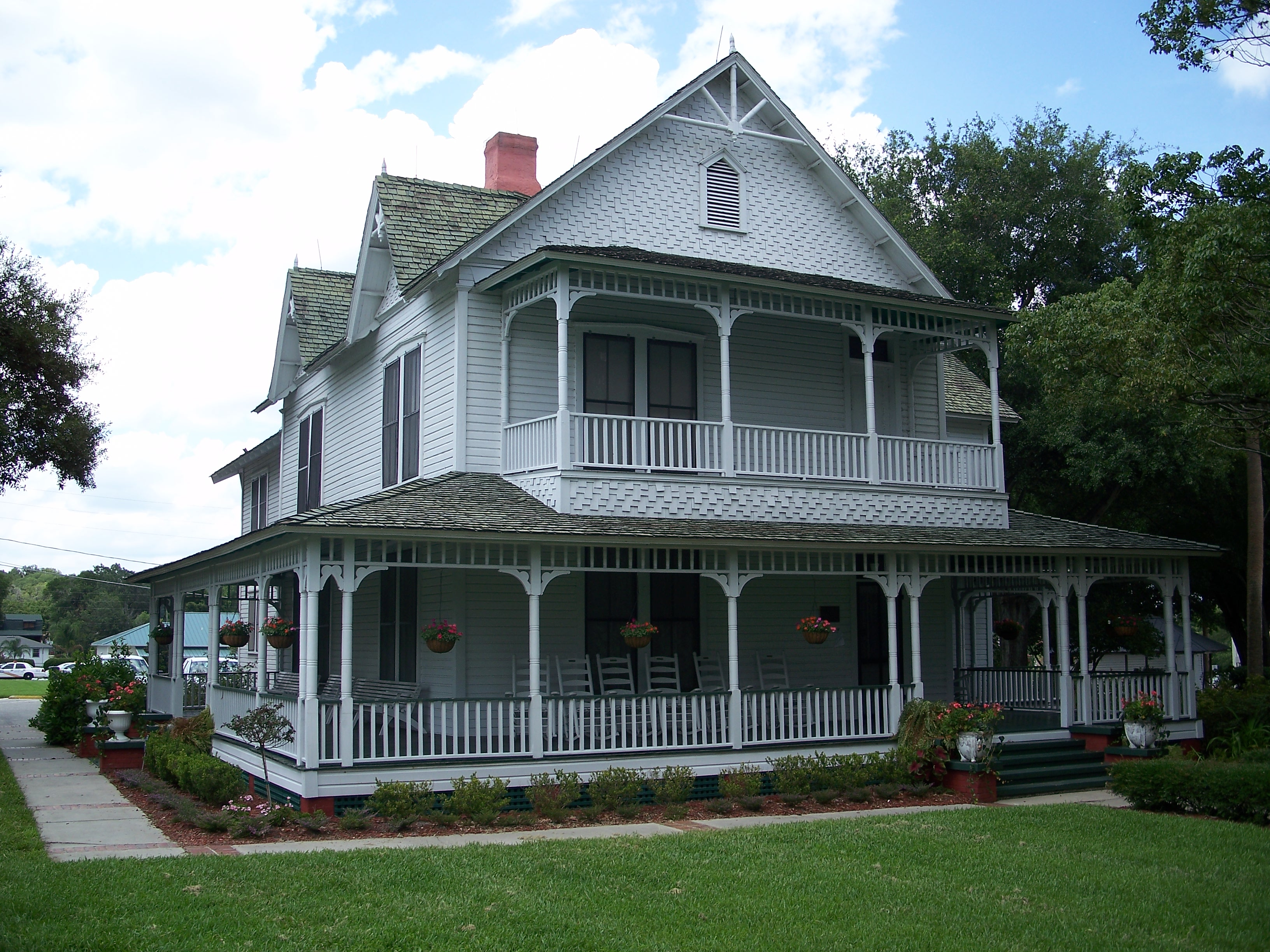
Withers-Maguire House (built 1888) in Ocoee, exemplary of Florida Vernacular Style Architecture

Immediately following the transfer of Florida from the Spanish to the United States in 1821, Governor Andrew Jackson created two counties: Escambia to the west of the Suwannee River and St. Johns to the east. In 1824, the area to the south of St. Johns County was organized as Mosquito County, and Enterprise was named its county seat. This large county took up much of central Florida. The Indian Removal Act of 1830 authorized relocation of the Seminole people from Florida to Oklahoma; this resulted in pushback from the Seminole community, leading to the Second Seminole War. In 1842, a bill was passed in the Florida Territorial Council to rename Mosquito County to Leigh Read County, however, this renaming never took place. Two years later, in 1844, residents of Mosquito County petitioned the Territorial Council to rename the county Harrison County, in honor of President William Henry Harrison, who had recently died. The petition was started in response to county residents finding the name unappealing. In 1845 when Florida became a state, the county was renamed Orange County. After the population increased in the region, the legislature organized several counties, such as Osceola (1887), Seminole (1913), Lake (1887), and Volusia (1854), from its territory.

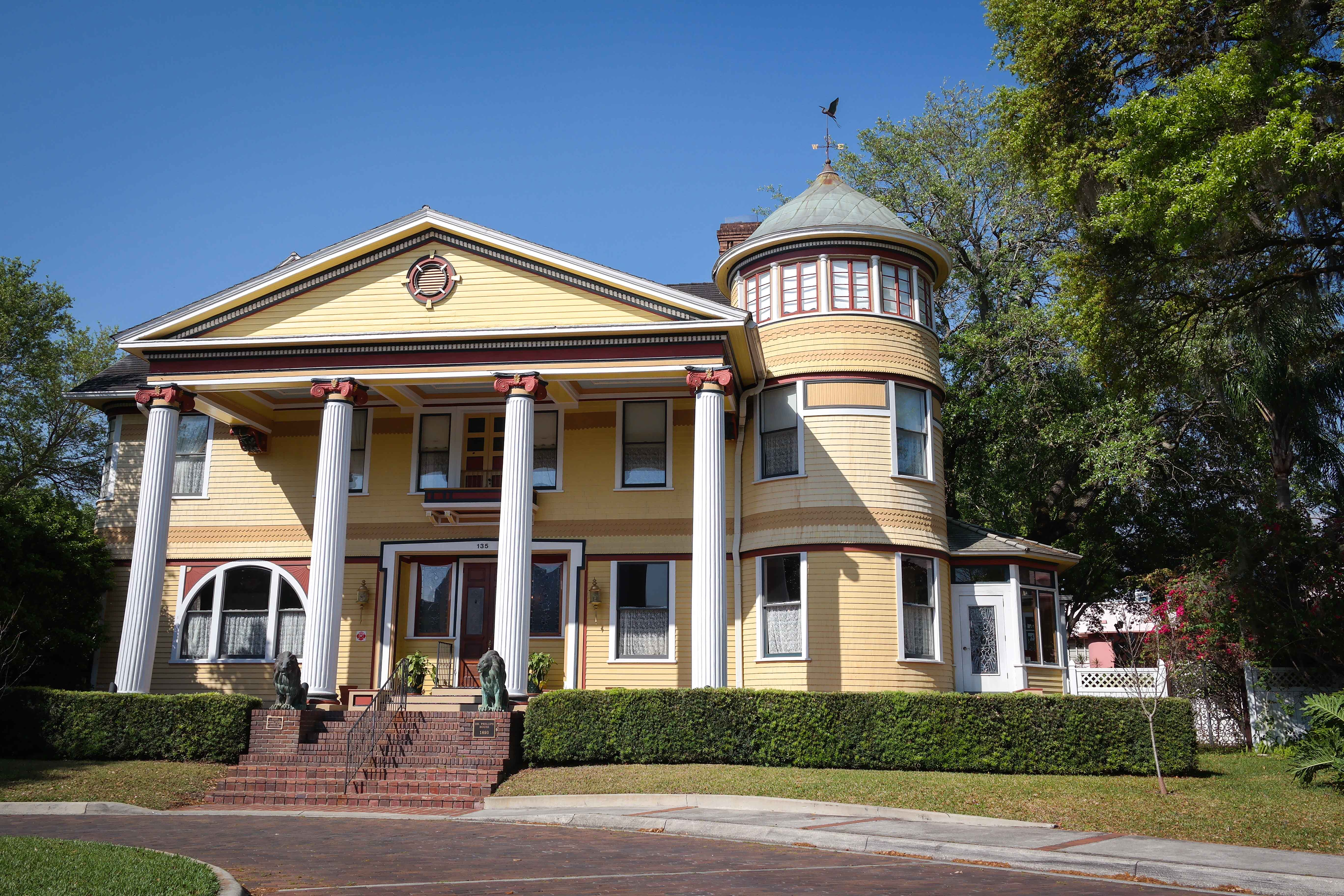
Dr. P. Phillips House (built 1893) was purchased by Dr. Phillips in 1912. He was a prominent figure in the county's citrus industry.

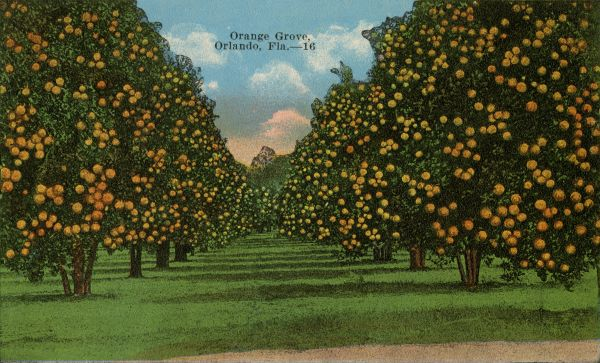
Postcard in 1921 depicting Orange groves near Orlando

Early on, the county greatly suffered, due to the Union blockade, but things greatly improved during Reconstruction. A boom in population, resulting from the incorporation of the Town of Orlando in 1875, greatly changed the demographics of the county. Orlando, establishing itself as a city in 1885, experienced rapid growth from 1875 to 1895, due to it becoming the hub of Florida's citrus industry. The fruit that constituted the county's main commodity crop was the impetus to the aforementioned county's renaming. The dark-green foliage of orange trees filled the county, as did the scent of the orange blossoms when in bloom. Fewer commercial orange groves remained by the end of the twentieth century. The majority of groves were destroyed by the freezing temperatures that occurred in December 1983, January 1985, and December 1989, the worst since 1899.

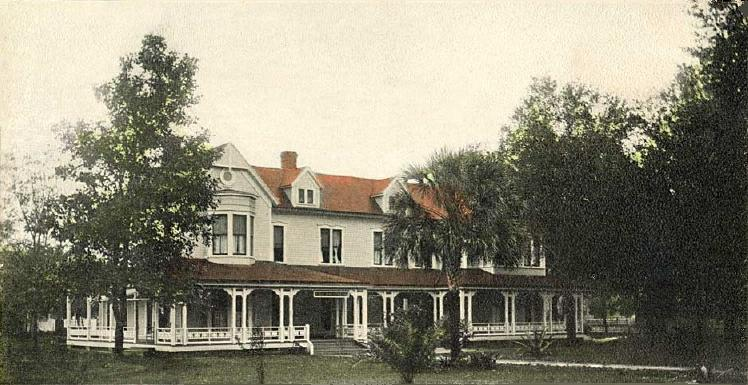
The Wyoming Hotel (built c. 1905)

During the post-Reconstruction period, white people committed a high rate of racial violence against black people in Orange County; racial terrorism was used to re-establish and maintain white supremacy. Whites lynched 33 African Americans here from 1877 to 1950; most were killed in the decades around the turn of the 20th century. This was the highest total of any county in the state, and sixth highest of any county in the country. Florida had the highest per-capita rate of lynchings of any state in the South, where the great majority of these extrajudicial murders took place.

Among the terrorist lynchings was the death of Julius "July" Perry of Ocoee, whose body was found November 3, 1920, hanged from a lightpole in Orlando, near the house of a judge known to be sympathetic to black voting. But this was part of a much larger story of KKK and other white attempts to suppress black voting in Ocoee and the state. African Americans had organized for a year to increase voter turnout for the 1920 presidential election, with organizations helping prepare residents for voter registration, paying for poll taxes, and similar actions. On Election Day in Ocoee, blacks were turned away from the polls. Perry, a prosperous farmer, was suspected of sheltering Mose Norman, an African-American man who had tried to vote. After Norman was twice turned away, white violence broke out, resulting in the Ocoee massacre, leaving an estimated 50 to 60 African-Americans dead and all the properties destroyed. Many blacks fled from Ocoee to save their lives, and the town became all-white. Voting efforts were suppressed for decades.

=== Later 20th century to present ===
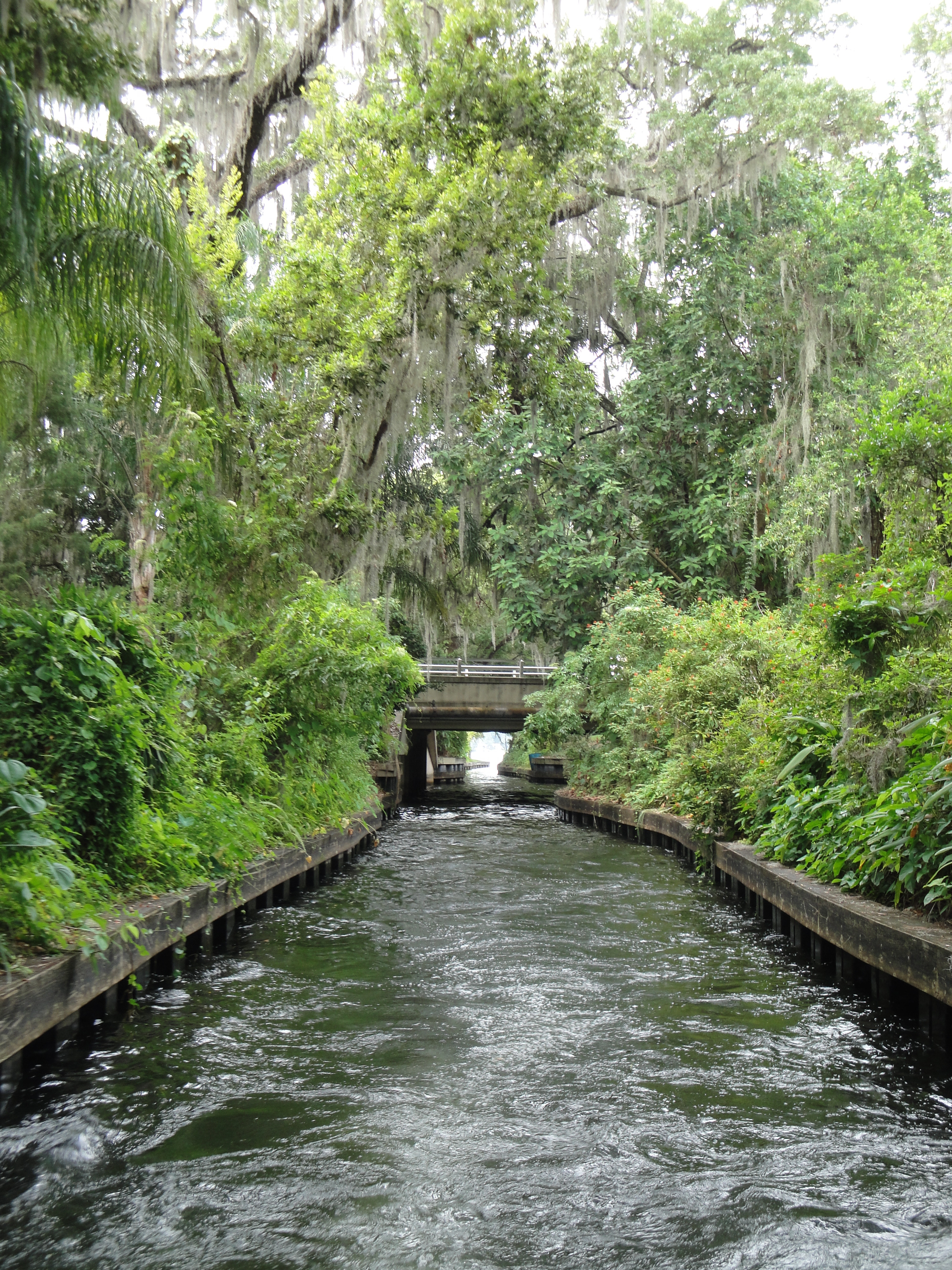
One of many canals in Winter Park that connect to different lakes within the community

Economically destroyed at the turn of the century by the decimation of the citrus industry, many farmers walked away from the region. The freeze caused many farmers in central Florida to move to other warm climates, such as to the Caribbean or to California (such as the similarly named Orange County, California). Others awaited other opportunities. One of the region's major land owners and growers was the Tropicana company. They withdrew rather than try to come back from these seemingly endless generational decimation. With no realistic avenues for agricultural use of this rural land, and Florida's continuing strong population growth and its attendant needs (aided and supported by the success of nearby Walt Disney World and Universal Studios Florida), these areas began to be developed for housing and other industries, especially after World War II.

In 1962 Orlando Jetport was built. The predecessor of modern-day Orlando International Airport, it was built from a portion of the McCoy Air Force Base. By 1970, four major airlines (Delta Air Lines, National Airlines, Eastern Airlines, and Southern Airways) had begun providing scheduled flights. McCoy Air Force Base officially closed in 1975, in which the airport still retains the former Air Force Base airport code (MCO).

In 1965, Walt Disney announced plans to build Walt Disney World. The renowned resort opened in October 1971. This had a seismic impact to the region, resulting in an explosive growth in the county's population and in its economy. The success of Disney World, allowed for other theme parks and entertainment attractions to open and thrive in the county, such as Universal Orlando and SeaWorld Orlando. The county now has more theme parks and entertainment attractions than anywhere else in the world.

In the 21st century, the county's economy has since diversified. Despite the rapid development in the county, thanks to gentrification relics of the historic core of "Old Orlando" still reside in downtown Orlando (along Church Street, between Orange Avenue and Garland Avenue), as well as within Orange County communities outside city limits, such as in Eatonville, Windermere, and Winter Park.

== Geography ==
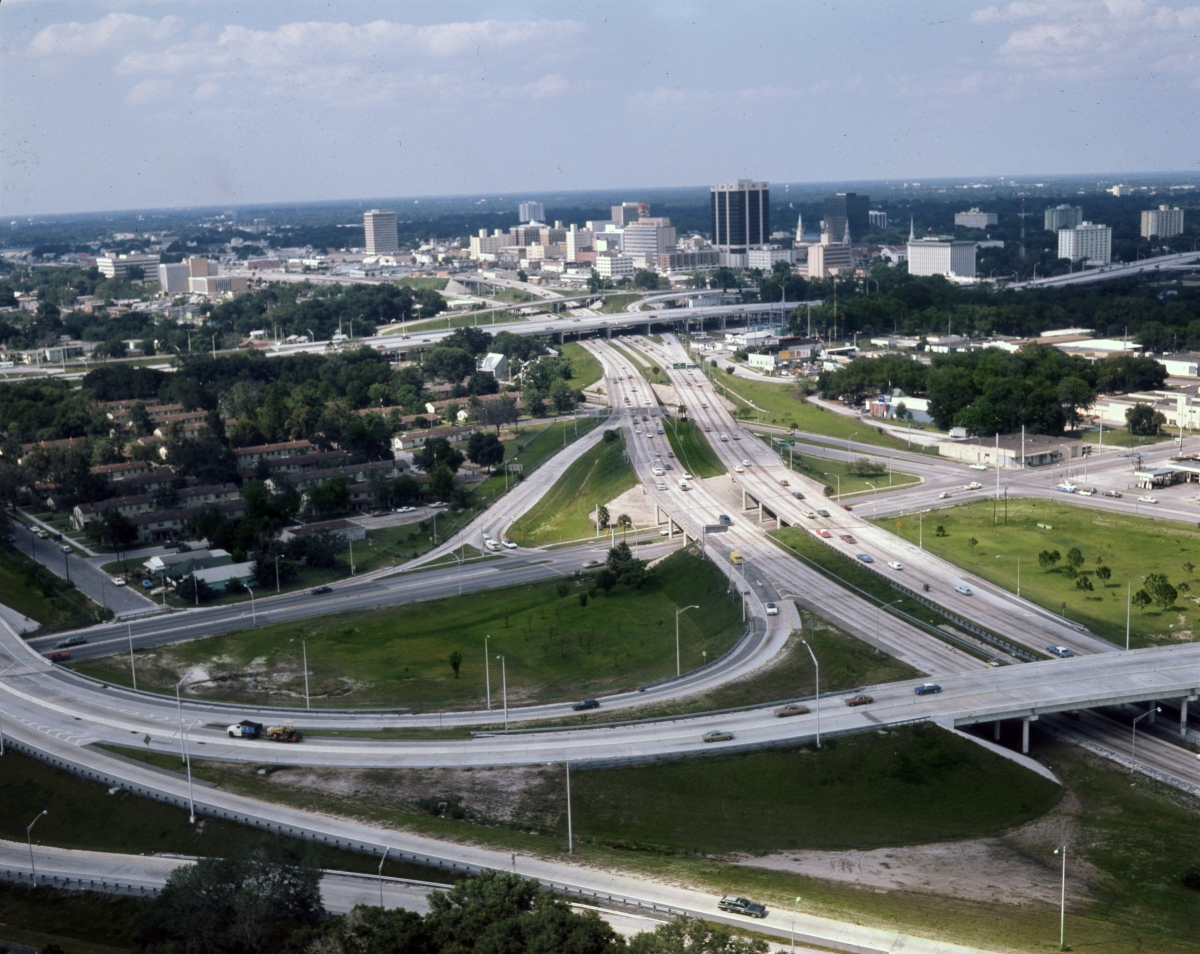
Aerial view of the intersection of I-4 and SR 408 near Downtown Orlando in 1976

According to the U.S. Census Bureau, the county has a total area of 1,003 square miles (2,600 km^{2}), of which 903 square miles (2,340 km^{2}) is land and 100 square miles (260 km^{2}) (10.0%) is water. Orange County is about 89 feet (27 m) above sea level. The county is bordered by Osceola County by the south, on the southwest by Polk County, on the west by Lake County, on the north by Seminole County, on the northeast by Volusia County, and on the east by Brevard County.

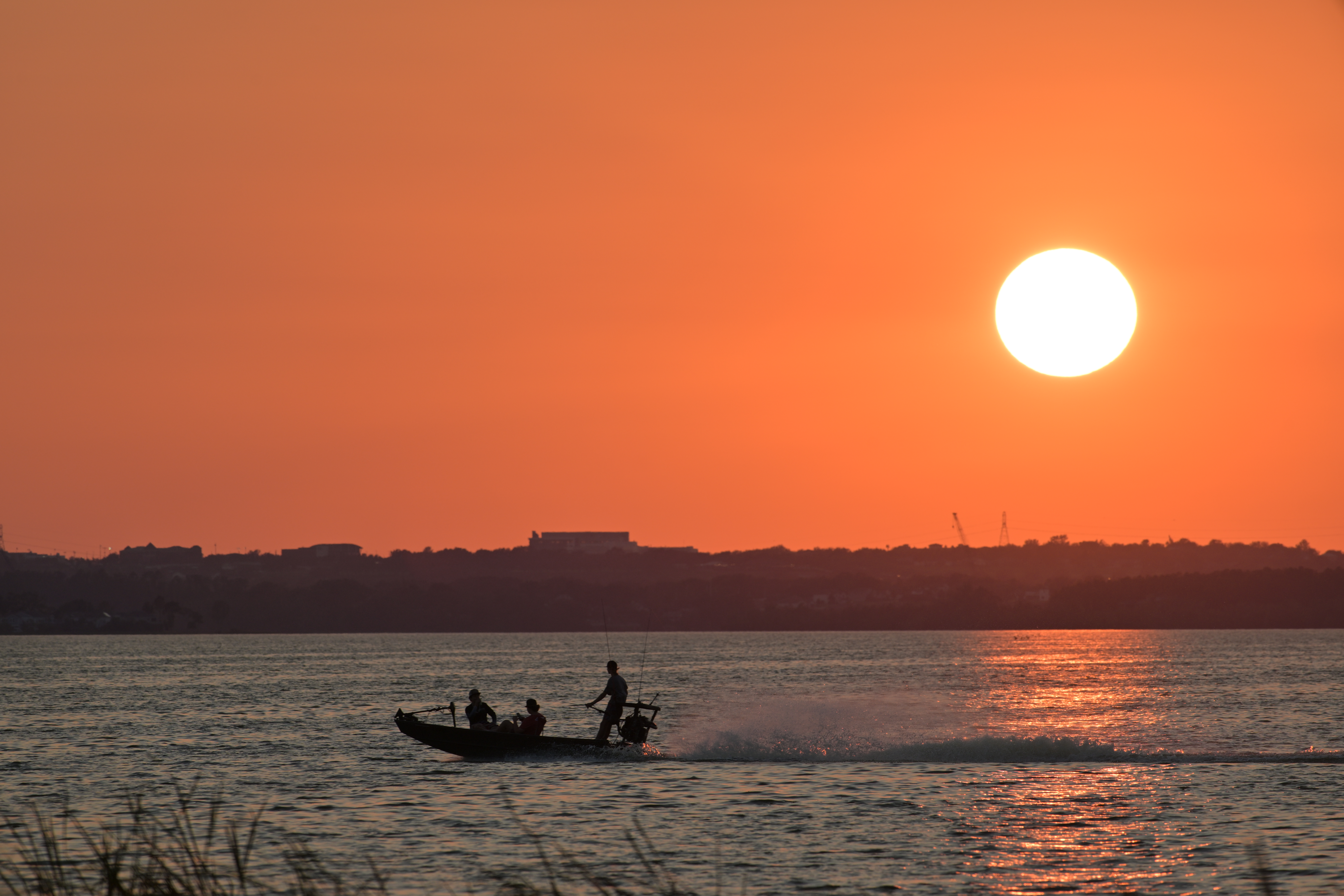
Lake Apopka in Winter Garden at sunset

Most of the county lies in the Florida coastal lowlands, while the northwestern areas rise into the Florida Central Highlands. The population center of the county is in the central and western sections in the transition zone from coastal plain to highlands, whereas eastern sections in the coastal plain are more remote in population. Orange County was part of the first land to rise up below from below the Early Oligocene sea about 33.9–28.4 million years ago, also known as Orange Island.

The headwaters for the Kissimmee River, which forms the northern part of the Everglades, are located in the county. Boggy Creek rises from the Orlando International Airport at 70 feet (21 m) above sea level, which is the primary inflow for East Lake Tohopekaliga in nearby Osceola County. Other watersheds within the county include the Ocklawaha and Wekiva rivers, along with the Upper and Middle basins, which are all sub-watersheds within the extensive St. Johns watershed. Lake Apopka is located in the county, on the course of the Ocklawaha River, and is the fourth largest lake in the state of Florida. Wekiwa Springs State Park is a 7,000-acre (28 km^{2}) Florida State Park along the course of the Wekiva River.

Despite Orange County being landlocked in the center of the state, it is still relatively close to many beaches to the east on the Atlantic Ocean, with Cocoa Beach being the closest and a popular destination. The Gulf of Mexico is also relatively close, although a bit farther away, to the west, with many beaches like Clearwater Beach and St. Pete Beach also being popular destinations.

=== Regions of Orange County ===
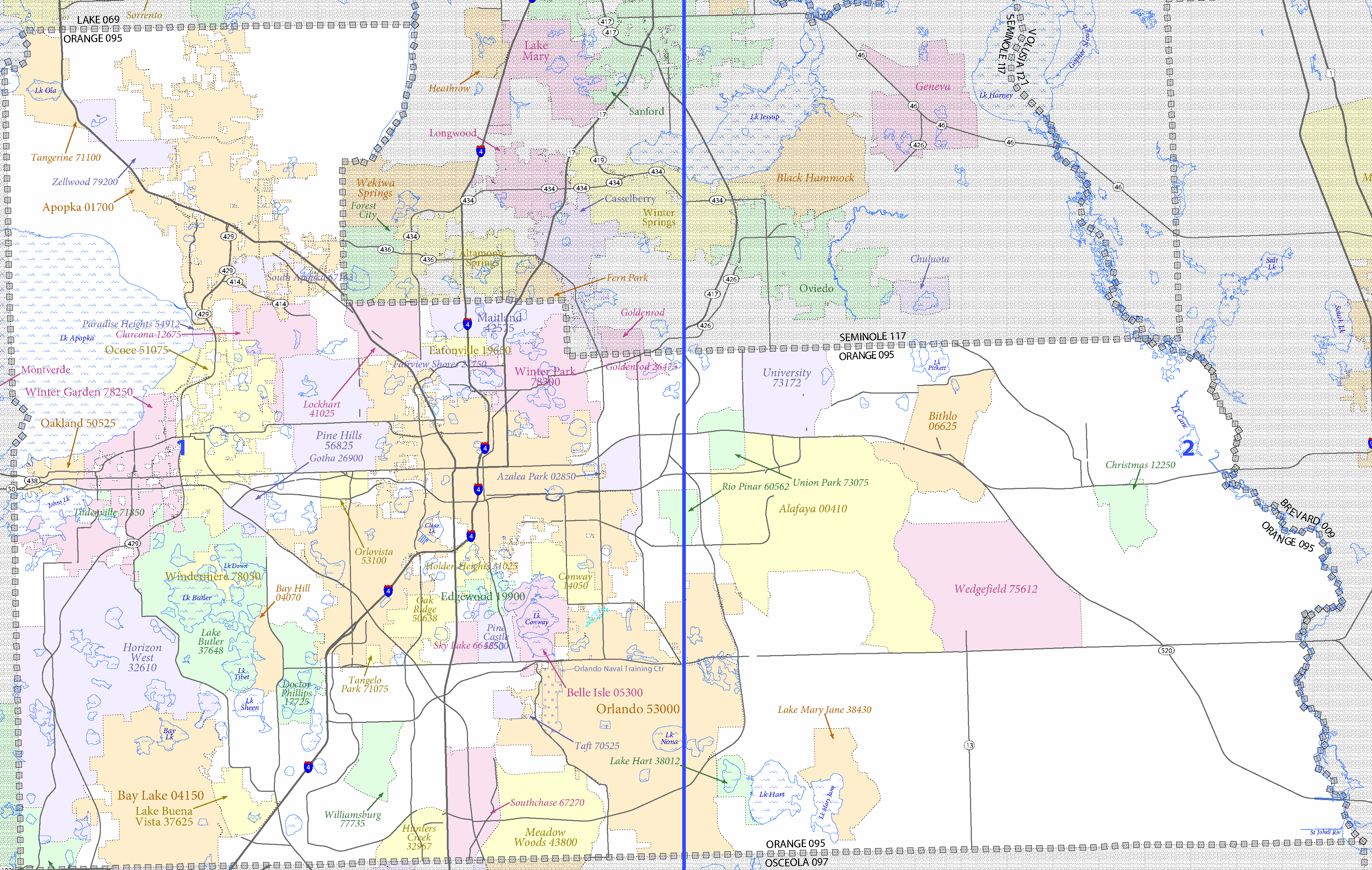
2010 U.S. Census tract map of Orange County

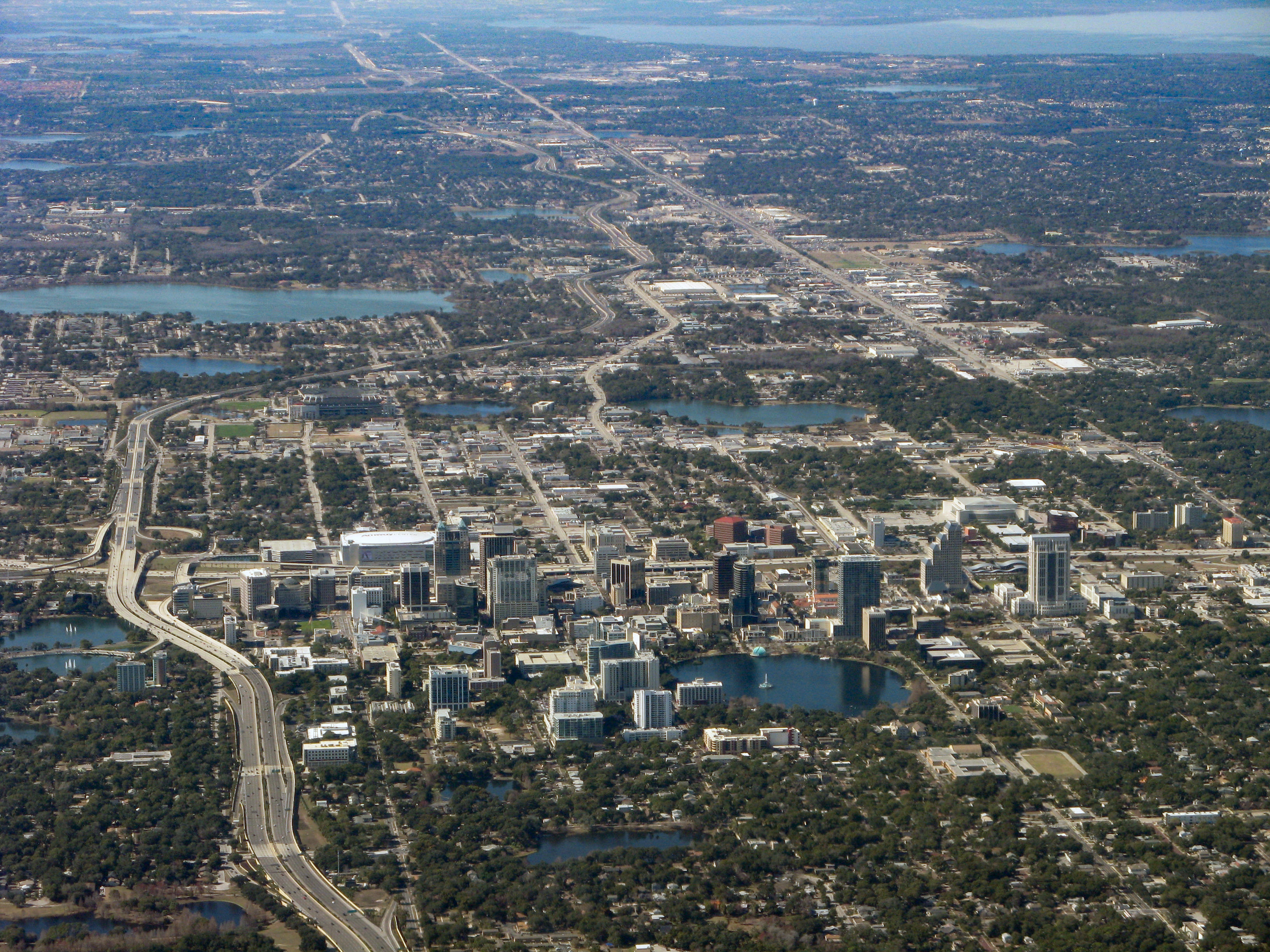
Aerial view of downtown Orlando (center) and Lake Apopka (upper-right) in 2011

Orange County is divided into six regions; the (central) Downtown area (with urban characteristics); the (southwestern) tourist strip (with a mixture of permanent dwellings, resorts, and hotels); a mixture of working-class, middle-class, and wealthier suburbs in the west (with some exurban characteristics); more historically established suburbs to the north (with inner-ring characteristics, attributed to the SunRail); a mixture of suburbs with more accessibly priced homes in the east (within the influence of University of Central Florida); and working-class neighborhoods and additional tourist attractions to the south (within the influence of nearby Kissimmee in neighboring Osceola County). Florida's Turnpike is popularly regarded as a dividing line between northern areas catering more to permanent residents and southern areas catering more to tourists.

There are 115 neighborhoods within the city limits of Orlando, along with many municipalities and unincorporated areas throughout the county. Orlando's city limits resemble a checkerboard, with pockets of unincorporated Orange County surrounded by city limits. Such an arrangement results in some areas being served by both Orange County and the City of Orlando. This also explains Orlando's relatively low city population when compared to its metropolitan population. The city and county are working together in an effort to "round-out" the city limits with Orlando annexing portions of land already bordering the city limits.

The center of government, commerce and culture in the county, is in Downtown Orlando, bordered by Marks Street in the north, Mills Avenue (SR 15) in the east, Orange Blossom Trail in the west, and Kaley Avenue in the south. Mostly composed of high-rise residential towers and office towers, 46 of the 79 high-rises in the Greater Orlando region are located in downtown. Dr. Phillips Center for the Performing Arts, Kia Center, Lake Eola, Orlando Museum of Art, and other attractions are located in downtown, along with corporate offices for banks such as Wells Fargo, Seacoast, and Suntrust banks, and government building such as Orange County Courthouse and Orlando City Hall.

In the southern region of the county is the rapidly growing community of Lake Nona. Along with being home to Lake Nona Golf & Country Club, it is also the health district for the city of Orlando, with Lake Nona Medical City. Featuring Nemours Children's Hospital, University of Central Florida's Health Sciences Campus, which includes the university's College of Medicine, Burnett School of Biomedical Sciences, College of Nursing, College of Dental Medicine, a teaching hospital, and other healthcare amenities.

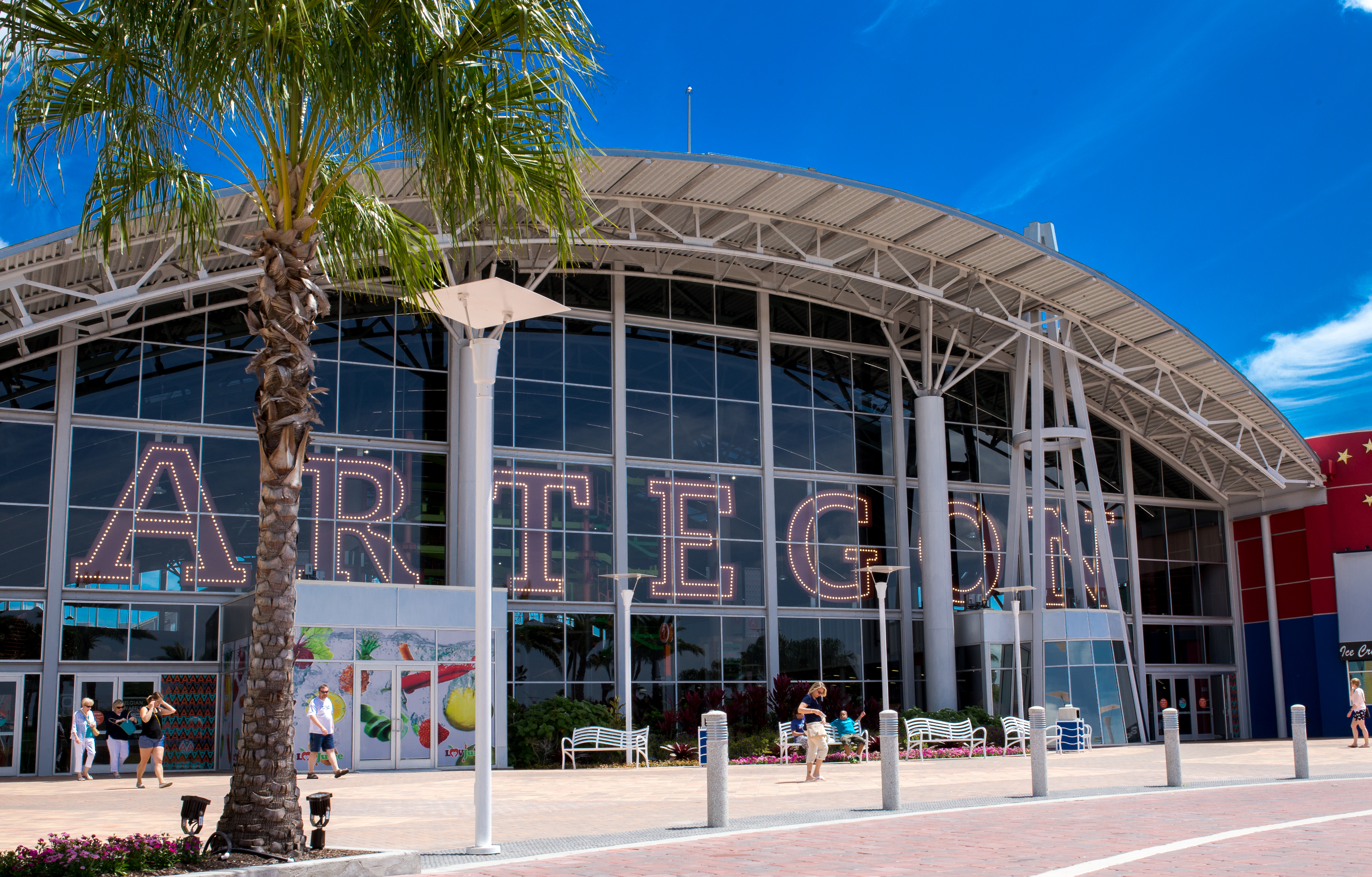
Dezerland Park Mall

The main tourist strip for the city is in the southwestern section of the county. International Drive, commonly known as I-Drive, is a major 11.1-mile (17.9 km) thoroughfare that traverses central and southern portions of unincorporated Orange County. An additional extension is known as International Drive South, partly located in the northern portion of Osceola County. Other major roads in this region include, Sand Lake Road, Kirkman Road, SR 536, and Universal Boulevard, which runs parallel to the midsection of International Drive. At its northern end, International Drive is home to Orlando International Premium Outlets and Universal Orlando resort, along with being in close proximity to the Epic Universe theme park that opened in May 2025. Further south on International Drive, it features the Orange County Convention Center, Dezerland Park mall, SeaWorld Orlando (along with Aquatica, SeaWorld's water park), Icon Park (featuring its famous Ferris wheel, Orlando Eye), the World's Largest Entertainment McDonald's, and other tourist ventures. This region is most known for being the location of Walt Disney World Resort, which covers nearly 25,000 acres (39 sq mi; 101 km^{2}) (of which half has been developed). The Central Florida Tourism Oversight District (formerly the Reedy Creek Improvement District) is the governing jurisdiction and special taxing district for the land of Disney World, encompassing a large swath of 39.06 sq mi (101.2 km^{2}) in southern Orange county and northern Osceola County. It acts with most of the same authority and responsibility as a county government. It includes the cities of Bay Lake and Lake Buena Vista, as well as unincorporated land, within Orange County. Other communities in southwestern Orange County, which have primarily suburban and exurban characteristics, include Bay Hill, Dr. Phillips, Four Corners, Horizon West, MetroWest, Williamsburg, and Windermere.

Orange County communities due west of Downtown Orlando, which primarily have exurban characteristics, include Apopka, Gotha, Oakland, Ocoee, Pine Hills, Tildenville, and Winter Garden. Orange County communities due north of Downtown Orlando, which are primarily more well-established and that have suburban and urban characteristics, include Baldwin Park, Eatonville, Fairview Shores, Goldenrod, Lockhart, Maitland, and Winter Park. Orange County communities due east of Downtown Orlando, which primarily have suburban and rural characteristics, include Alafaya, Avalon Park, Azalea Park, Bithlo, Christmas, Union Park, and Wedgefield. The east side of the county is also the home of the University of Central Florida (UCF). Orange County communities due south of Downtown Orlando, which primarily have suburban characteristics, include Conway, Hunter's Creek, Lake Nona, Meadow Woods, Oak Ridge, Southchase, and Taft.

=== Communities ===
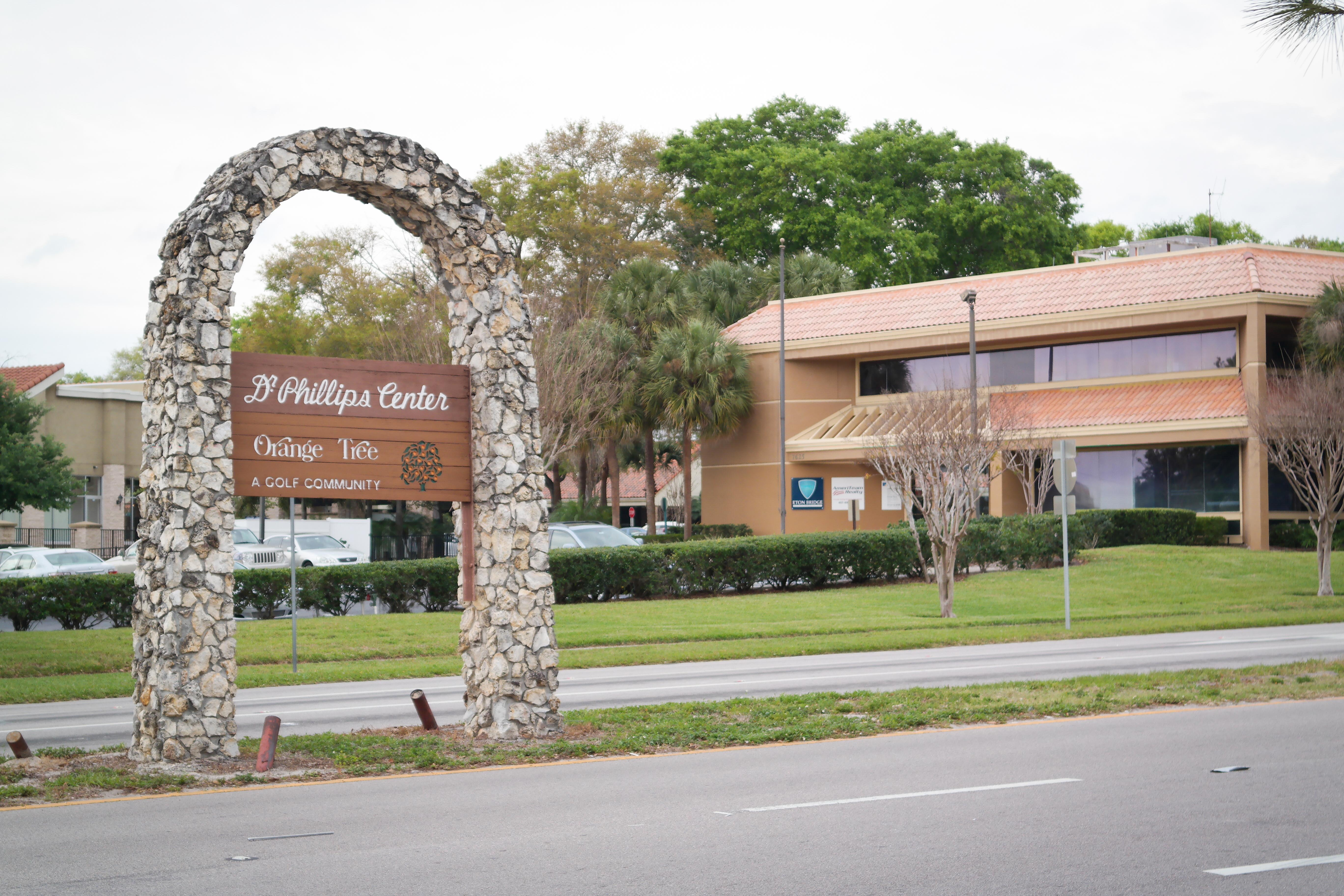
Dr. Phillips Center in the community of Dr. Phillips

Orange County includes 13 incorporated areas, 38 census-designated places, and 7 unincorporated regions.

=== Adjacent counties ===
- Seminole County - north
- Volusia County - northeast
- Brevard County - east
- Osceola County - south
- Polk County - southwest
- Lake County - west

=== Climate ===
Orange County

Climate chart (precipitation, max. and min. temperature)
J	F	M	A	M	J	J	A	S	O	N	D
2.7 70 47	2.7 73 50	4 78 54	2.5 82 58	3.2 87 65	7.5 90 71	6.8 92 73	7.8 92 73	6 89 71	3.1 84 65	2.3 78 57	2.5 72 50
- █ Average max. and min. temperatures in °F
- █ Precipitation totals in inches
Metric conversion
J	F	M	A	M	J	J	A	S	O	N	D
69 21 8	69 23 10	102 26 12	64 28 14	81 31 18	191 32 22	173 33 23	198 33 23	152 32 22	79 29 18	58 26 14	64 22 10
- █ Average max. and min. temperatures in °C
- █ Precipitation totals in mm

== Demographics ==
Historical population
Census	Pop.	Note	%±
1830	733		—
1840	73		−90.0%
1850	466		538.4%
1860	987		111.8%
1870	2,195		122.4%
1880	6,618		201.5%
1890	12,584		90.1%
1900	11,374		−9.6%
1910	19,107		68.0%
1920	19,890		4.1%
1930	49,737		150.1%
1940	70,074		40.9%
1950	114,950		64.0%
1960	263,540		129.3%
1970	344,311		30.6%
1980	471,016		36.8%
1990	677,491		43.8%
2000	896,344		32.3%
2010	1,145,956		27.8%
2020	1,429,908		24.8%
2025 (est.)	1,528,002	▲	6.9%
U.S. Decennial Census; 1830–1970 1980 1990; 2000 2010 2020 2022

=== 2020 census ===
As of the 2020 census, the county had a population of 1,429,908. The median age was 35.6 years. 22.0% of residents were under the age of 18 and 12.4% of residents were 65 years of age or older. For every 100 females there were 95.0 males, and for every 100 females age 18 and over there were 92.5 males age 18 and over.

The racial makeup of the county was 44.0% White, 19.4% Black or African American, 0.4% American Indian and Alaska Native, 5.5% Asian, 0.1% Native Hawaiian and Pacific Islander, 12.0% from some other race, and 18.5% from two or more races. Hispanic or Latino residents of any race comprised 33.1% of the population.

97.7% of residents lived in urban areas, while 2.3% lived in rural areas.

There were 519,437 households in the county, of which 33.5% had children under the age of 18 living in them. Of all households, 44.1% were married-couple households, 19.2% were households with a male householder and no spouse or partner present, and 28.6% were households with a female householder and no spouse or partner present. About 23.6% of all households were made up of individuals and 6.9% had someone living alone who was 65 years of age or older.

There were 561,851 housing units, of which 7.5% were vacant. Among occupied housing units, 53.8% were owner-occupied and 46.2% were renter-occupied. The homeowner vacancy rate was 1.8% and the rental vacancy rate was 8.0%.

=== Racial and ethnic composition ===
Historical racial composition	2020	2010	2000	1990	1980
White (non-Hispanic)	37.2%	46.0%	57.5%	73.3%	80.0%
Hispanic or Latino	33.1%	26.9%	18.8%	9.6%	4.2%
Black or African American (non-Hispanic)	18.4%	19.5%	17.5%	14.8%	14.6%
Asian and Pacific Islander (non-Hispanic)	5.5%	4.9%	3.4%	2.0%	1.3%
Native American (non-Hispanic)	0.2%	0.2%	0.2%	0.3%	1.3%
Other Race (non-Hispanic)	1.1%	0.5%	0.3%	0.1%	1.3%
Two or more races (non-Hispanic)	4.6%	2.0%	2.2%	N/A	N/A
Population	1,429,908	1,145,956	896,344	677,491	471,016

Demographic characteristics	2020	2010	2000	1990	1980
Households	561,851	487,839	361,349	254,852	170,754
Persons per household	2.54	2.35	2.48	2.66	2.76
Sex Ratio	95.0	97.0	98.0	98.4	94.6
Ages 0–17	22.0%	23.6%	25.3%	23.8%	26.6%
Ages 18–64	65.6%	66.7%	64.7%	65.6%	62.8%
Ages 65 +	12.4%	9.7%	10.0%	10.6%	10.6%
Median age	35.6	33.7	33.3	31.4	29.5
Population	1,429,908	1,145,956	896,344	677,491	471,016

Economic indicators
2017–21 American Community Survey	Orange County	Florida
Median income	$33,160	$34,367
Median household income	$65,784	$61,777
Poverty Rate	13.9%	13.1%
High school diploma	89.5%	89.0%
Bachelor's degree	35.7%	31.5%
Advanced degree	12.7%	11.7%

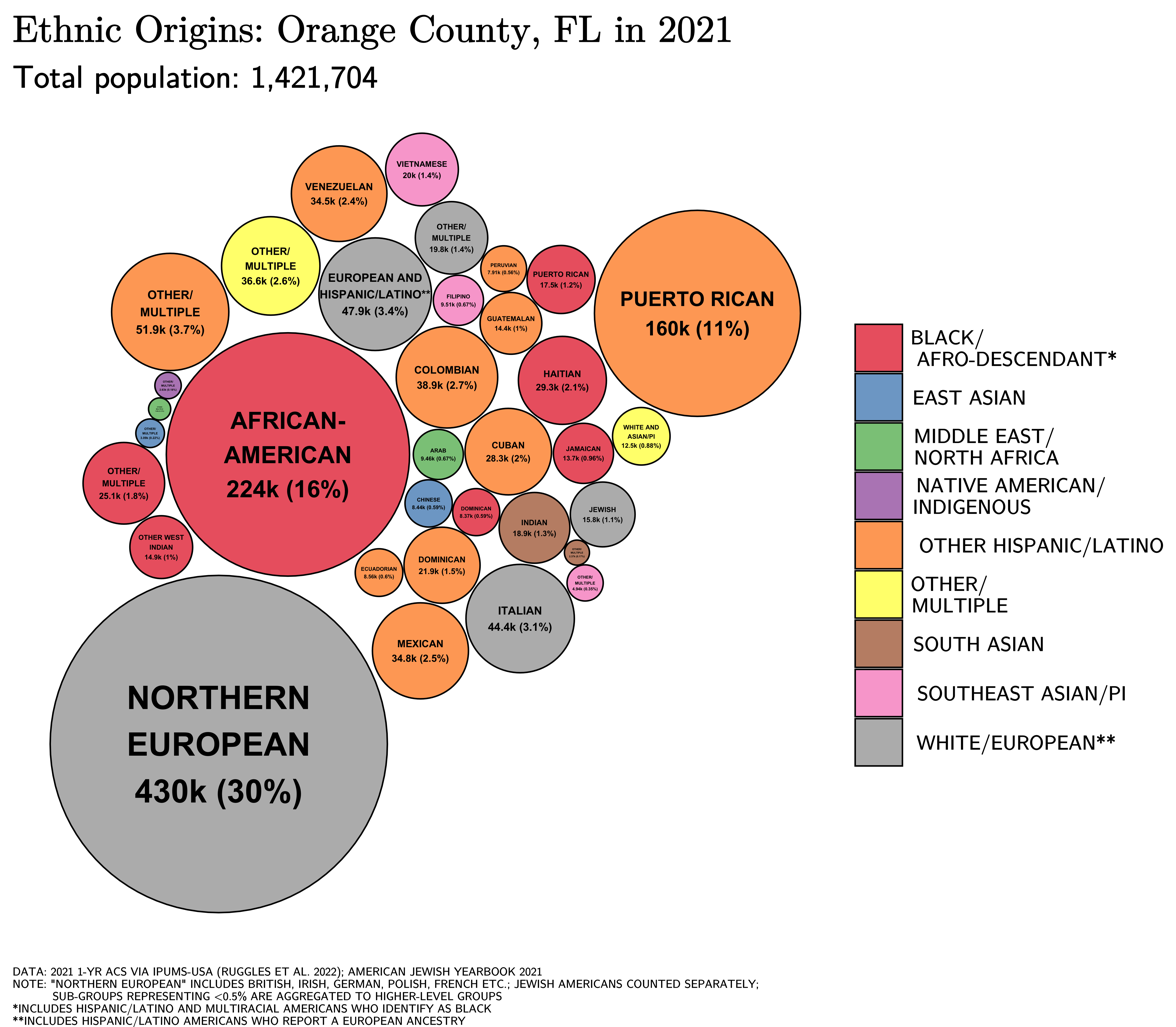
Ethnic origins in Orange County

Language spoken at home (Note: Language spoken at home among residents at least five years old; only languages (or language groups) which at least 2% of residents have spoken at any time since 1980 are mentioned)	2015 (Note: Refers to 2013–2017 American Community Survey data; the last Decennial Census where language data was collected was in the 2000 census)	2010 (Note: Refers to 2008–2012 American Community Survey data; the last Decennial Census where language data was collected was in the 2000 census)	2000	1990	1980
English	64.7%	66.6%	74.6%	86.4%	92.9%
Spanish or Spanish Creole	24.7%	23.2%	17.3%	9.0%	3.9%
French or Haitian Creole	3.6%	3.2%	2.6%	1.1%	0.6%
Vietnamese	1.2%	1.0%	0.9%	0.7%	0.3%
Other Languages	7.0%	7.0%	5.5%	3.5%	2.6%

Nativity	2015 (Note: Refers to 2013–2017 American Community Survey data; the last Decennial Census where foreign-born population data was collected was in the 2000 census)	2010 (Note: Refers to 2008–2012 American Community Survey data; the last Decennial Census where foreign-born population data was collected was in the 2000 census)	2000	1990	1980
% population native-born	79.3%	80.9%	85.6%	92.5%	95.0%
... born in the United States	70.2%	73.0%	78.7%	88.0%	93.2%
... born in Puerto Rico or Island Areas	7.8%	6.7%	5.8%	3.4%	1.8%
... born to American parents abroad	1.3%	1.2%	1.0%	1.1%	1.8%
% population foreign-born (Note: Only countries of birth which at least 0.75% of residents were born in at any time since 1980 are mentioned)	20.7%	19.1%	14.4%	7.5%	5.0%
... born in Haiti	2.4%	2.0%	1.5%	0.4%	N/A (Note: Not counted separately; aggregated into "Other" category)
... born in Colombia	1.5%	1.7%	1.0%	0.3%	N/A
... born in Mexico	1.4%	1.7%	1.2%	0.4%	0.2%
... born in Cuba	1.3%	1.1%	1.0%	0.7%	0.6%
... born in Venezuela	1.2%	0.6%	0.3%	< 0.1%	N/A
... born in Jamaica	1.1%	1.1%	1.0%	0.6%	0.2%
... born in the Dominican Republic	1.0%	1.0%	0.6%	0.2%	< 0.1%
... born in Brazil	1.0%	0.8%	0.5%	< 0.1%	N/A
... born in other countries	9.8%	9.1%	7.3%	4.9%	4.0%

== Economy ==
=== Corporate ===
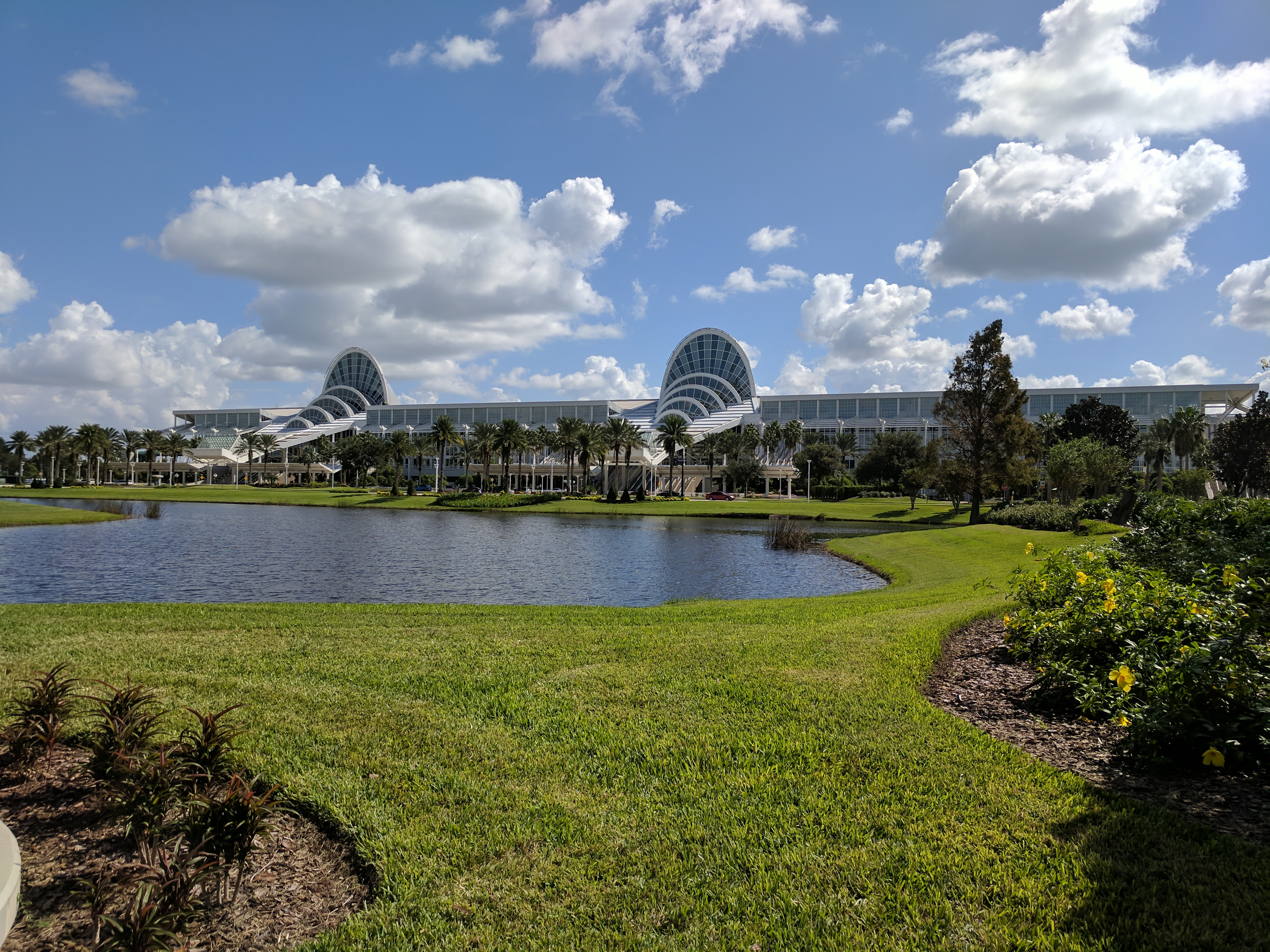
Orange County Convention Center is the primary public convention center for the Central Florida region and the second-largest convention center in the United States, after McCormick Place in Chicago

ABC Fine Wine & Spirits, Atlantic.net, Central Florida Expressway Authority, Darden Restaurants, Miller's Ale House, Planet Hollywood, and Tijuana Flats (among others) have their corporate headquarters in the county.

Other companies with offices in the county include (but are not limited to):

- Amazon
- JetBlue
- Lockheed Martin
- Tupperware

Orange County Convention Center is a convention center located in the aforementioned county. It is the primary public convention center for the Central Florida region and the second-largest convention center in the United States, after McCormick Place in Chicago. Located on the south end of International Drive, the OCCC offers 7,000,000 sq ft (650,000 m^{2}) of space, 2,100,000 sq ft (200,000 m^{2}) of which is exhibit space. The OCCC hosts events attracting about 1.5 million people annually, injecting $2.5 billion into the region's economy.

=== Healthcare ===
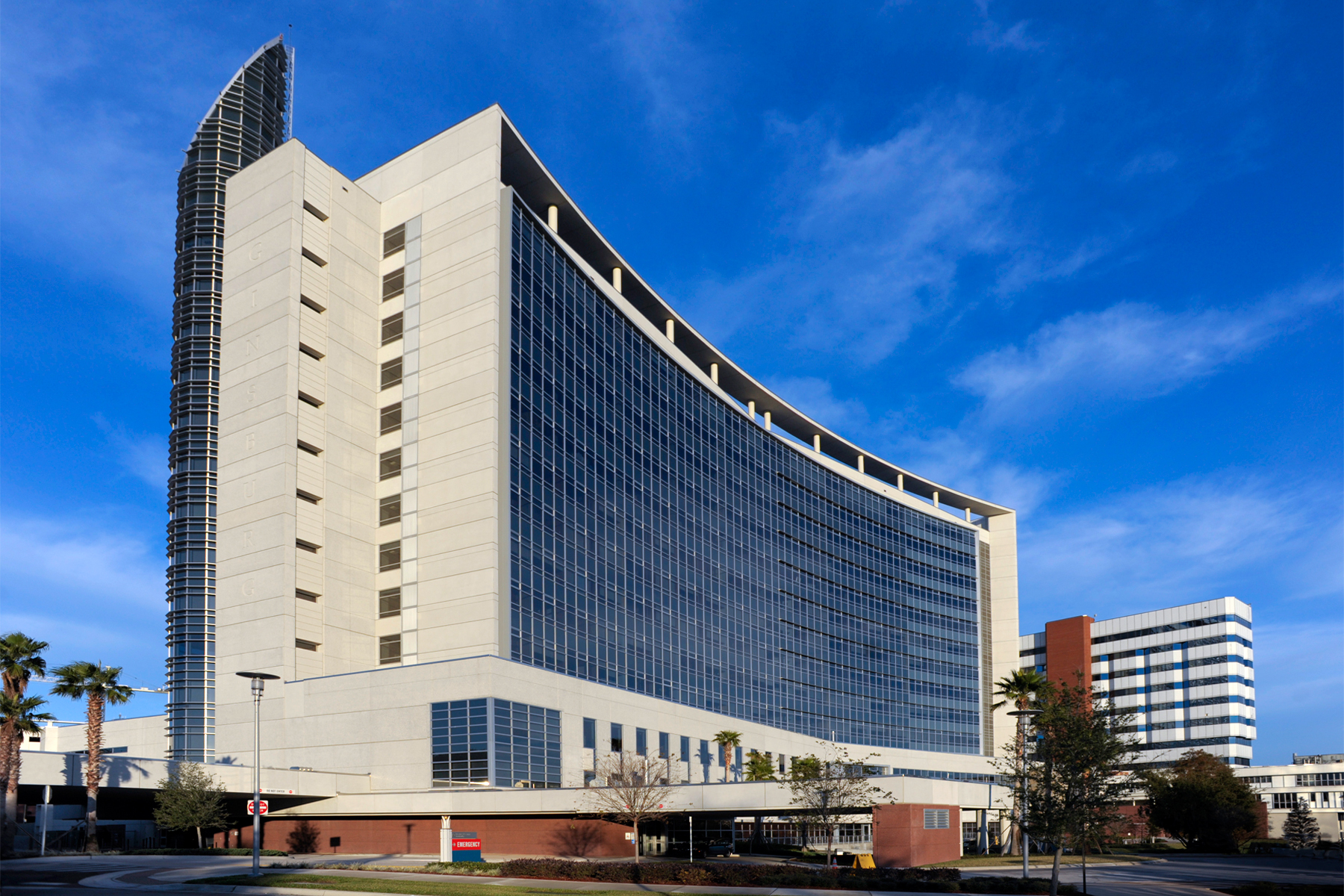
AdventHealth in Orlando is a non-profit hospital owned by AdventHealth (the largest in its hospital network). As of 2023, AdventHealth is the largest hospital in Central Florida, the second largest hospital in Florida, and the third largest hospital in the United States

Orange County has been a growing-hub for healthcare in Central Florida. Two of the largest healthcare networks in the county are AdventHealth and Orlando Health, which were both founded in the county. Currently, the headquarters for Orlando Health is in Orange County, whereas the headquarters for AdventHealth is located in neighboring Seminole County.

Lake Nona Medical City (a master-planned community) is a 650-acre (260 ha) health and life sciences park in Lake Nona. The city is home to the University of Central Florida's Burnett School of Biomedical Sciences, the College of Medicine, the College of Nursing, and the College of Dental Medicine, along with its teaching hospital. The city also includes the Sanford-Burnham Medical Research Institute, Nemours Children's Hospital, and the University of Florida's College of Pharmacy (ranked #5 among all pharmacy schools in the nation).

=== Shopping ===
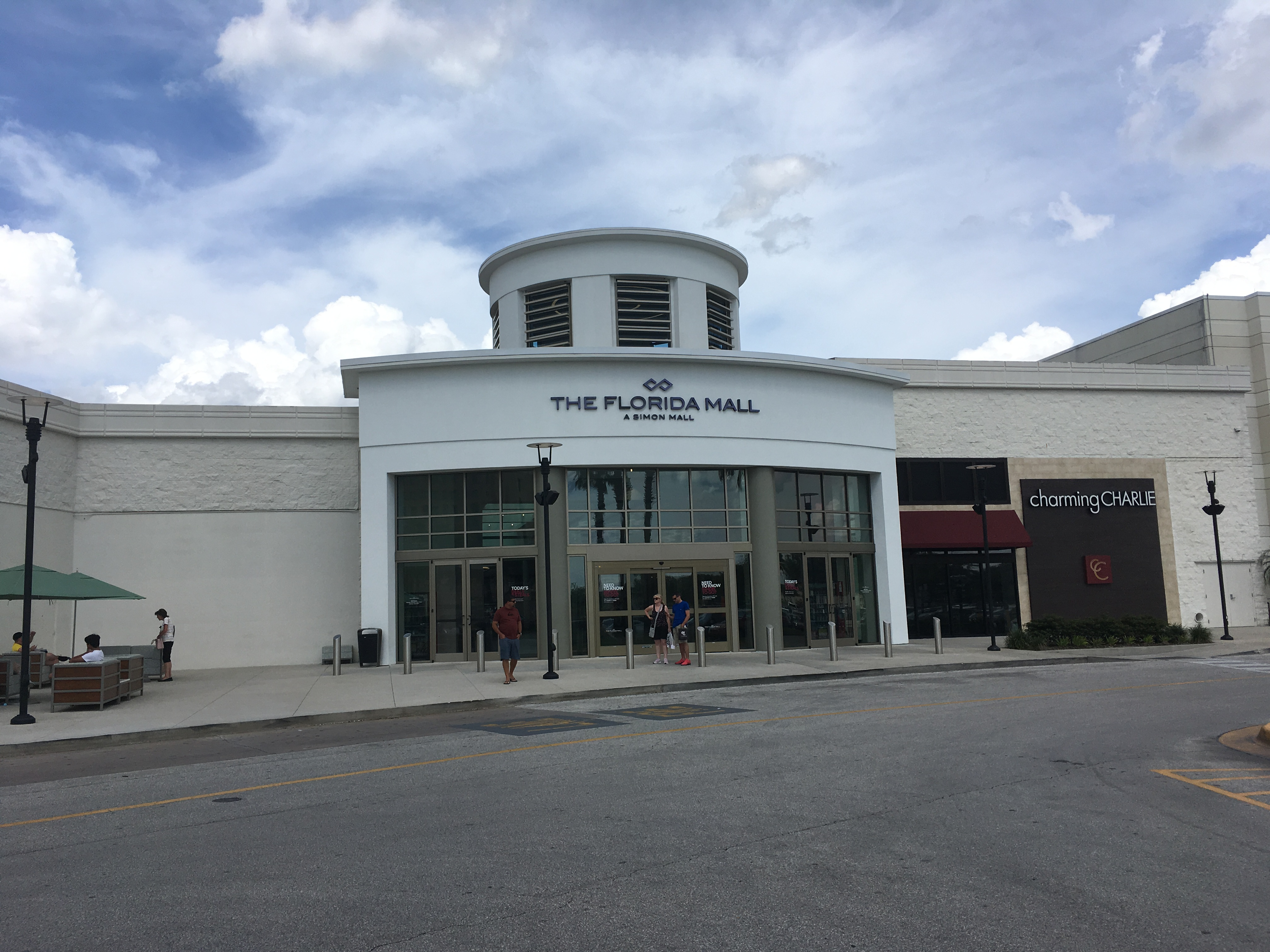
The Florida Mall

The transient nature of Orange County makes it a major regional commercial hub for the State of Florida. The Florida Mall is located in unincorporated Orange County, and with a gross leasable area of 1,718,000 square feet (159,600 m^{2}) it is one of the largest single-story malls in the United States and the largest mall in Central Florida. With over 250 stores and various dining options (including 25 quick-service restaurants and 8 sit-down restaurants), The Florida Mall attracts over 20 million visitors annually, including domestic and international tourists.

Disney Springs is an outdoor shopping, dining, and entertainment complex at the Walt Disney World Resort in Lake Buena Vista. The 120-acre (49 ha) complex includes four distinct areas: Marketplace, The Landing, Town Center, and West Side. Walt Disney Imagineers took inspiration from real coastal towns in Florida, such as St. Augustine and Coral Gables. Universal CityWalk in Orlando is the entertainment and retail district located adjacent to the theme parks of Universal Studios Florida and Universal Islands of Adventure at Universal Orlando.

Other regional shopping destinations in the county include Dezerland Park Orlando, Disney's Flamingo Crossings, The Mall at Millenia, Orlando Fashion Square, Orlando International Premium Outlets, Orlando Vineland Premium Outlets, Waterford Lakes Town Center, West Oaks Mall, Winter Garden Village, and Winter Park Village.

=== Sports ===
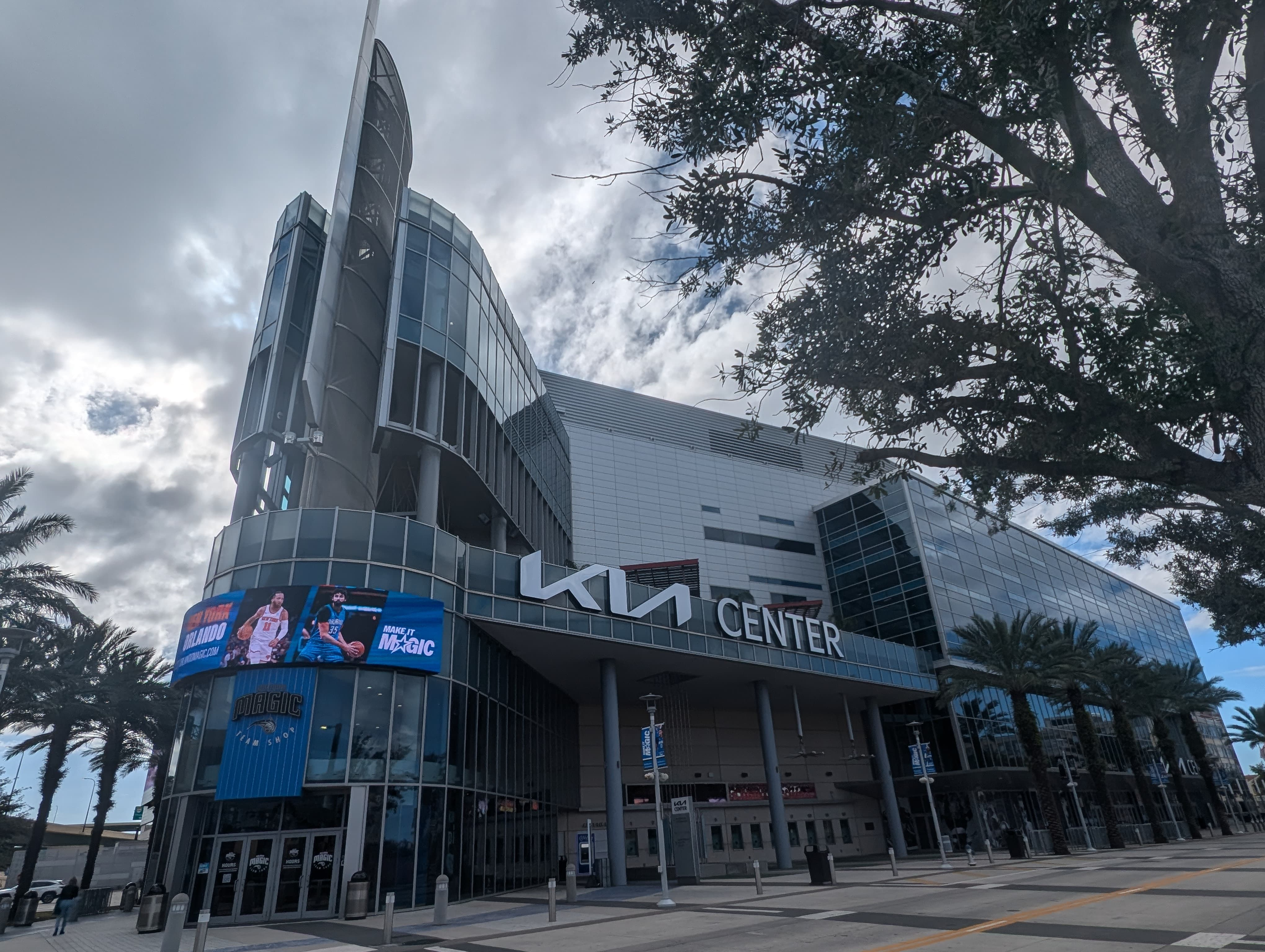
Kia Center, an indoor arena home to the Orlando Magic of the NBA, the Orlando Solar Bears of the ECHL, and the Orlando Predators of the National Arena League

Orange County hosts two major league professional sports teams: the Orlando Magic of the National Basketball Association (NBA), and Orlando City SC of Major League Soccer (MLS). There are also minor league professional teams, such as the Orlando Solar Bears of the ECHL, the Orlando Predators of the National Arena League (NAL), and the Orlando Anarchy of the Women's Football Alliance. The UCF Knights, the athletics teams of the University of Central Florida, compete in NCAA Division I.

The ESPN Wide World of Sports Complex is a 220-acre (89 ha) multi-purpose sports complex located at Walt Disney World in Bay Lake. The complex includes nine venues, hosting professional and amateur sporting events throughout the year. Most notable of events hosted at the venues include the 2020 NBA Bubble (due to the COVID-19 pandemic), the MLS is Back tournament, the 2016 Invictus Games, the Pro Bowl skills competition from 2017 to 2020, the 1997 U.S. Men's Clay Court Championships, and the 2022 Special Olympics USA Games. The Atlanta Braves utilized the facilities for spring training from 1997 to 2019, along with the Tampa Bay Rays utilizing the complex in 2023 spring training, due to Charlotte Sports Park being heavily damaged by Hurricane Ian in the previous year.

The Arnold Palmer Invitational on the PGA Tour is played each March at the Bay Hill Club and Lodge, a private golf resort owned since 1974 by Arnold Palmer in the community of Bay Hill. Other notable golf clubs in the county are the Eagle Creek Golf Club, the Lake Nona Golf & Country Club, and the Rio Pinar Country Club. The Golf Channel was formerly headquartered in Orange County. However, in February 2020, it was reported that the Golf Channel would consolidate its television operations with the remainder of NBC Sports at its facilities in Stamford, Connecticut. GolfNow and GolfPass services continue to primarily operate out of the greater Orlando area.

=== Tourism and hospitality ===
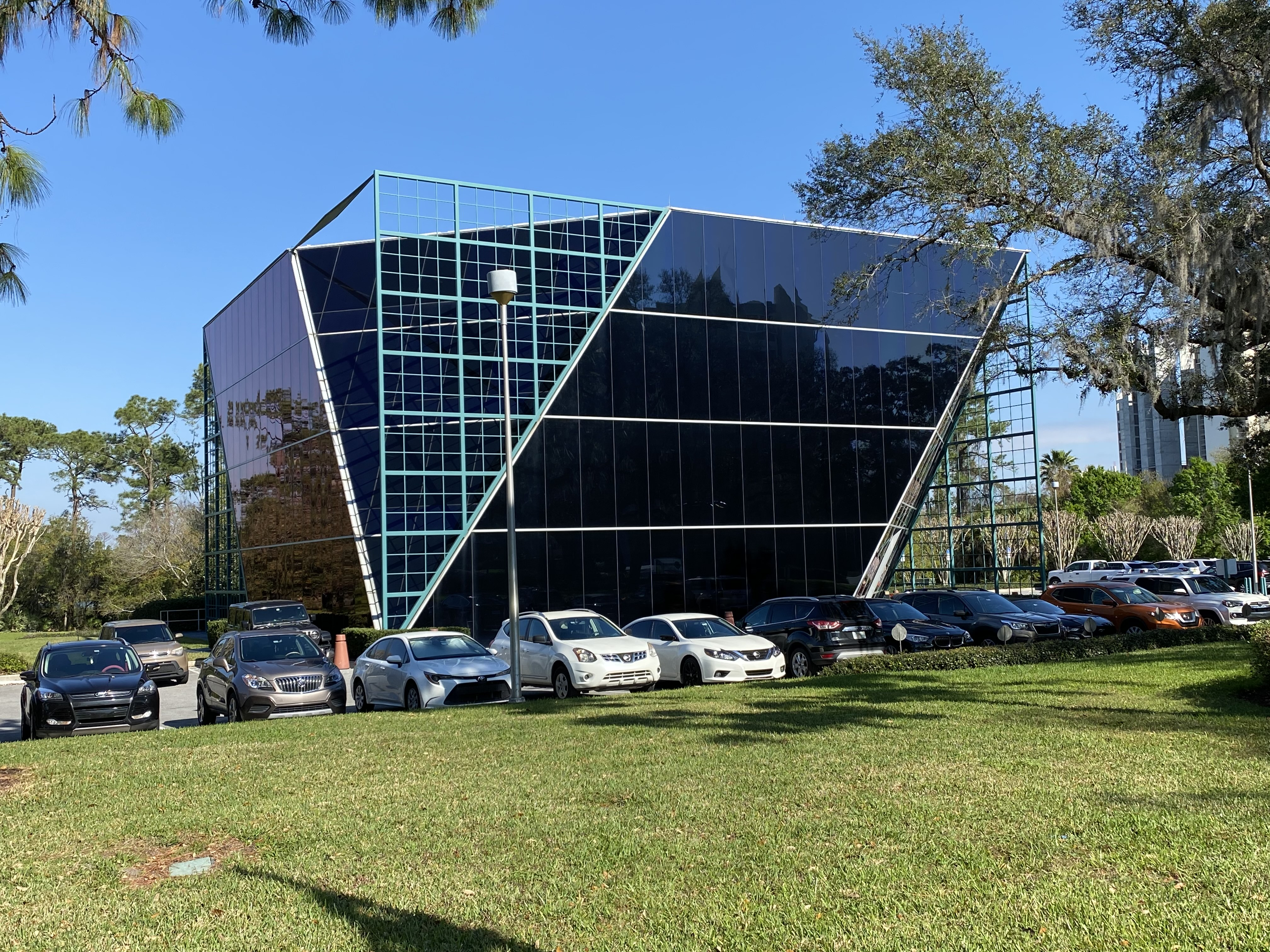
Central Florida Tourism Oversight District Office in Lake Buena Vista is the governing jurisdiction and special taxing district for the land of Walt Disney World Resort.

Tourism remains at the core of Orange County's economy. Nicknamed the 'Theme Park Capital of the World', the county is home to Walt Disney World, Universal Orlando, and SeaWorld Orlando, among many other theme parks. As of 2022, with over 2.9 million visitors, Orlando was the third-most visited city in the U.S. after New York City and Miami. Orlando International Airport is the 7th-busiest airport in the United States and the 18th-busiest in the world. The county features 7 of the 10 most visited theme parks in North America (5 of the top 10 in the world), as well as the 4 most visited water parks in the U.S. The Walt Disney World resort is the area's largest attraction. The resort is home to, the Magic Kingdom, Epcot, Disney's Hollywood Studios, Disney's Animal Kingdom, Disney's Typhoon Lagoon, Disney's Blizzard Beach and Disney Springs. Universal Orlando encompasses Universal Studios Florida, Universal Islands of Adventure, Universal Epic Universe, Universal Volcano Bay and Universal CityWalk. SeaWorld Orlando is an animal theme park, featuring numerous marine wildlife displays, alongside an amusement park, Aquatica water park, and Discovery Cove. Other theme parks include Fun Spot Orlando, Icon Park, Madame Tussauds, and Sealife Aquarium.

Along with these tourist offerings, the county is also home to the corporate headquarters for these theme parks' operations. One of the two corporate headquarters for Disney Experiences is located in Lake Buena Vista (the other headquarters is located in Glendale, California). There were reportedly plans from Disney, that they were to expand more of their corporate presence in Orange County, with the transferring of DPEP positions over the next couple of years to a new 60-acre corporate campus in the Lake Nona area of the county, with as many as 90% of the transferred positions being Imagineering positions. However, the planned relocation was cancelled in May 2023 amidst the feud between Disney and Florida's governor Ron DeSantis. United Parks & Resorts (formerly SeaWorld Entertainment Inc. or SeaWorld Parks & Entertainment) is an American theme park and entertainment company, with corporate headquarters located in Orange County. Along with SeaWorld, United Parks & Resorts is the parent company for the theme parks Adventure Island, Aquatica, Busch Gardens, Discovery Cove, Sesame Place, Water Country USA, and Worlds of Discovery.

In-turn, hospitality is incredibly vital to the county's economy. Westgate Resorts, an American timeshare resort company, was founded and is currently headquartered in the county. As of July 2021, Westgate Resorts has 22 locations across the United States. Other major hospitality companies with a significant economic presence (both corporate and in its resort properties) within the county include:

- Hilton Grand Vacations Club
- Marriott Vacation Club International
- Ryman Hospitality Properties
- Travel + Leisure Co. (formerly part of Wyndham Worldwide)

== Government ==
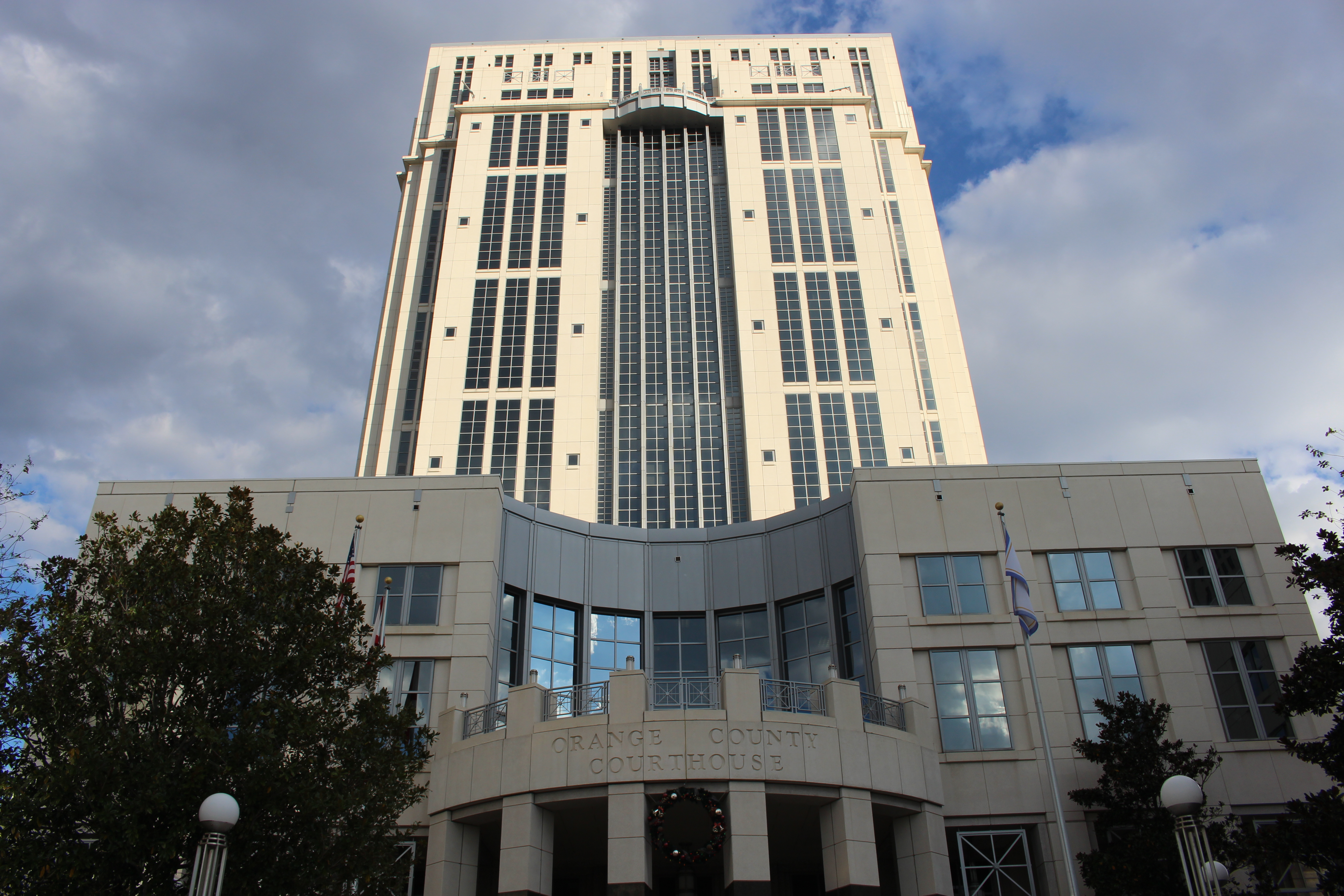
Orange County Courthouse

The county functions under a charter form of government. The charter serves as a constitution, detailing the structure and operation of the local government. A Charter Review Commission has the power to consider and place amendments on the ballot. Voters then decide whether to accept or reject all amendments put forth. If voters approve an amendment, it is then inserted into the charter.

=== Federal representation ===
Four districts of the U.S. House of Representatives represent parts of Orange County.

Federal representation
District	Incumbent	Hometown	% Orange County voters
8	Mike Haridopolos	Indian Harbour	1.3
9	Darren Soto	Kissimmee	15.66
10	Maxwell Frost	Orlando	58.24
11	Daniel Webster	Clermont	21.29

District 8 encompasses all of Brevard and Indian River Counties and far eastern Orange County. District 9 encompasses all of Osceola County, eastern Polk County and southern Orange County. District 10 encompasses most of Orange County. District 11 encompasses all of Sumter County, and parts of Lake, Polk, and western Orange County.

=== State representation ===
Orange County residents are represented in Tallahassee with 3 Senate seats.

State senators
District	Incumbent	Hometown	% Voters	Next election
11	Randolph Bracy	Orlando	37.44	2020
13	Linda Stewart	Orlando	42.55	2020
15	Victor Torres	Orlando	20	2020

District 11 encompasses northwestern Orange County, District 13 encompasses north central and northeastern Orange County, and District 15 encompasses all of Osceola County and the southern third of Orange County.

Orange County residents are represented in Tallahassee with 9 House seats.

State representatives
District	Incumbent	Hometown	% Voters	Next election
35	Tom Keen	Alafaya	4.56	2024
37	Susan Plasencia	Oviedo	5.08	2024
39	Doug Bankson	Orlando	15.22	2024
40	LaVon Bracy Davis	Orlando	12.46	2024
41	Bruce Antone	Orlando	10.47	2024
42	Anna Eskamani	Orlando	15.64	2024
43	Johanna Lopez	Azalea Park	13.01	2024
44	Jennifer "Rita" Harris	Hunter's Creek	13.81	2020
45	Carolina Amesty	Windermere	9.74	2024
47	Paula Stark	Kissimmee	9.74	2024

District 37 encompasses southern Seminole and portions of northern Orange County, Districts 35, 46, and 47 encompass Osceola County and Orange County, and Districts 39, 40, 41, 42, 43, and 44 are wholly composed of Orange.

=== County representation ===
Orange County is served by a board of commissioners. The board consists of an elected mayor and six commissioners. The mayor is elected At-large, while commissioners are elected from single-member districts. The mayor and commissioners each serve staggered four-year terms. Commissioners from Districts 1, 3, and 5 are elected in presidential election years, while the mayor and commissioners from Districts 2, 4, and 6 are elected in alternate years. The county is also served by a clerk of courts, sheriff, property appraiser, tax collector, supervisor of elections, state attorney, and public defender. All positions are four-year terms, requiring direct election by voters in presidential election years.

Orange County officials
Position	Incumbent	Next election
Mayor	Jerry Demings	2026
District 1 Commissioner	Nicole Wilson	2028
District 2 Commissioner	Christine Moore	2026
District 3 Commissioner	Mayra Uribe	2028
District 4 Commissioner	Maribel Gomez Cordero	2026
District 5 Commissioner	Kelly Semrad	2028
District 6 Commissioner	Mike Scott	2025
Clerk of the Circuit Court	Tiffany Moore Russell	2028
Sheriff	John Mina	2028
Comptroller	Phil Diamond	2028
Property Appraiser	Amy Mercado	2028
Tax Collector	Scott Randolph	2028
Supervisor of Elections	Karen Castor Dentel	2028
State Attorney	Monique Worrell	2028
Public Defender	Melissa Vickers	2028

== Politics ==
Orange County is located along the pivotal Interstate 4 corridor, which until recently was a powerful swing region in what was one of the country's most critical swing states. Many close elections were won or lost depending on the voting outcome along the corridor. Voters were considered independent, traditionally splitting their votes, electing Democrats and Republicans on the same ballot. As a result of such independence, voters were inundated with non-stop television and radio ads months preceding a general election.

Orange County was one of the first areas of Florida to turn Republican. It swung from a 15-point victory for Franklin D. Roosevelt in 1944 to a seven-point victory for Thomas E. Dewey in 1948. It eventually became one of the stronger Republican bastions in Florida, as evidenced when it gave Barry Goldwater 56 percent of its vote in 1964. For most of the second half of the 20th century, it was one of the more conservative urban counties in Florida and the nation. From 1948 to 1988, Democrats only cracked the 40 percent barrier twice, in 1964 and 1976. However, the Republican edge narrowed considerably in the 1990s. George H. W. Bush fell from 67 percent of the vote in 1988 to only 45.9 percent in 1992. In 1996, Bob Dole only won the county by 520 votes.

In September 2000, Democrats overtook Republicans in voter registration. This was a factor in Al Gore becoming the first Democratic presidential candidate to carry the county since 1944. John Kerry narrowly carried the county in 2004 by less than 1,000 votes. In 2008, however, Orange County swung hard to Barack Obama, who won it by the largest margin for a Democrat since Roosevelt. In the years since, it has become one of the strongest Democratic bastions in Florida.

Since 2000, Republicans have yet to retake the advantage they once enjoyed. In the twelve years that followed, Democrats experienced a modest increase in their voter registration percentage from 41.40% to 42.73% of the electorate. Minor party voters also had modest growth, increasing from 2.17% to 2.37%. In contrast, Republicans experienced a sharp decrease in registered voters, sliding from 40.95% in 2000 down to 29.85% in 2012. The beneficiary of the Republican losses have been unaffiliated voters. The percentage of the electorate identifying as an unaffiliated voter increased from 15.47% to 25.06% during this same period. Orange County is one of two different counties in the entire nation to have voted for Al Gore in 2000 after voting for Dole in 1996, a distinction it shares with Charles County, Maryland.

However, Orange County went to Kamala Harris by just 13 points in 2024, the closest margin in Orange County since 2004. This made Orange County one of just six Florida counties to go for Harris, as Donald Trump won the former swing state of Florida by 13 points. Florida is now considered a red state, and presidential campaigns are unlikely to focus on the state in the future.

United States presidential election results for Orange County, Florida
Year	Republican		Democratic		Third party(ies)	
Year	No.	%	No.	%	No.	%
1892	0	0.00%	1,142	92.10%	98	7.90%
1896	565	32.47%	1,086	62.41%	89	5.11%
1900	402	29.03%	857	61.88%	126	9.10%
1904	315	25.26%	874	70.09%	58	4.65%
1908	485	30.14%	952	59.17%	172	10.69%
1912	228	12.37%	1,256	68.15%	359	19.48%
1916	415	23.62%	1,261	71.77%	81	4.61%
1920	1,447	39.45%	2,035	55.48%	186	5.07%
1924	1,653	40.24%	1,883	45.84%	572	13.92%
1928	6,524	70.04%	2,616	28.08%	175	1.88%
1932	3,522	41.93%	4,877	58.07%	0	0.00%
1936	4,394	37.53%	7,314	62.47%	0	0.00%
1940	8,198	39.00%	12,821	61.00%	0	0.00%
1944	8,826	42.36%	12,008	57.64%	0	0.00%
1948	11,971	46.67%	10,063	39.23%	3,618	14.10%
1952	29,813	71.06%	12,141	28.94%	0	0.00%
1956	37,482	72.06%	14,532	27.94%	0	0.00%
1960	48,244	70.98%	19,729	29.02%	0	0.00%
1964	48,884	56.10%	38,248	43.90%	0	0.00%
1968	50,874	50.54%	22,548	22.40%	27,247	27.07%
1972	94,516	79.57%	23,840	20.07%	421	0.35%
1976	70,451	54.01%	58,442	44.80%	1,544	1.18%
1980	87,454	61.06%	48,767	34.05%	6,998	4.89%
1984	122,068	71.39%	48,752	28.51%	165	0.10%
1988	117,237	67.86%	54,023	31.27%	1,510	0.87%
1992	108,788	45.90%	82,683	34.89%	45,540	19.21%
1996	106,059	45.89%	105,539	45.66%	19,528	8.45%
2000	134,531	48.02%	140,236	50.06%	5,388	1.92%
2004	192,539	49.62%	193,354	49.83%	2,151	0.55%
2008	186,832	40.35%	273,009	58.96%	3,198	0.69%
2012	188,589	40.36%	273,665	58.56%	5,049	1.08%
2016	195,216	35.37%	329,894	59.77%	26,792	4.85%
2020	245,398	37.80%	395,014	60.85%	8,745	1.35%
2024	258,279	42.54%	340,807	56.13%	8,113	1.34%

=== Voter registration ===
Registered active voters by party as of May 23, 2025
Party	Total	Percentage
Democratic	320,197	39.23%
Republican	224,390	27.49%
Minor parties	26,343	3.23%
Unaffiliated	245,269	30.05%
Total	816,199	100.00%

== Education ==
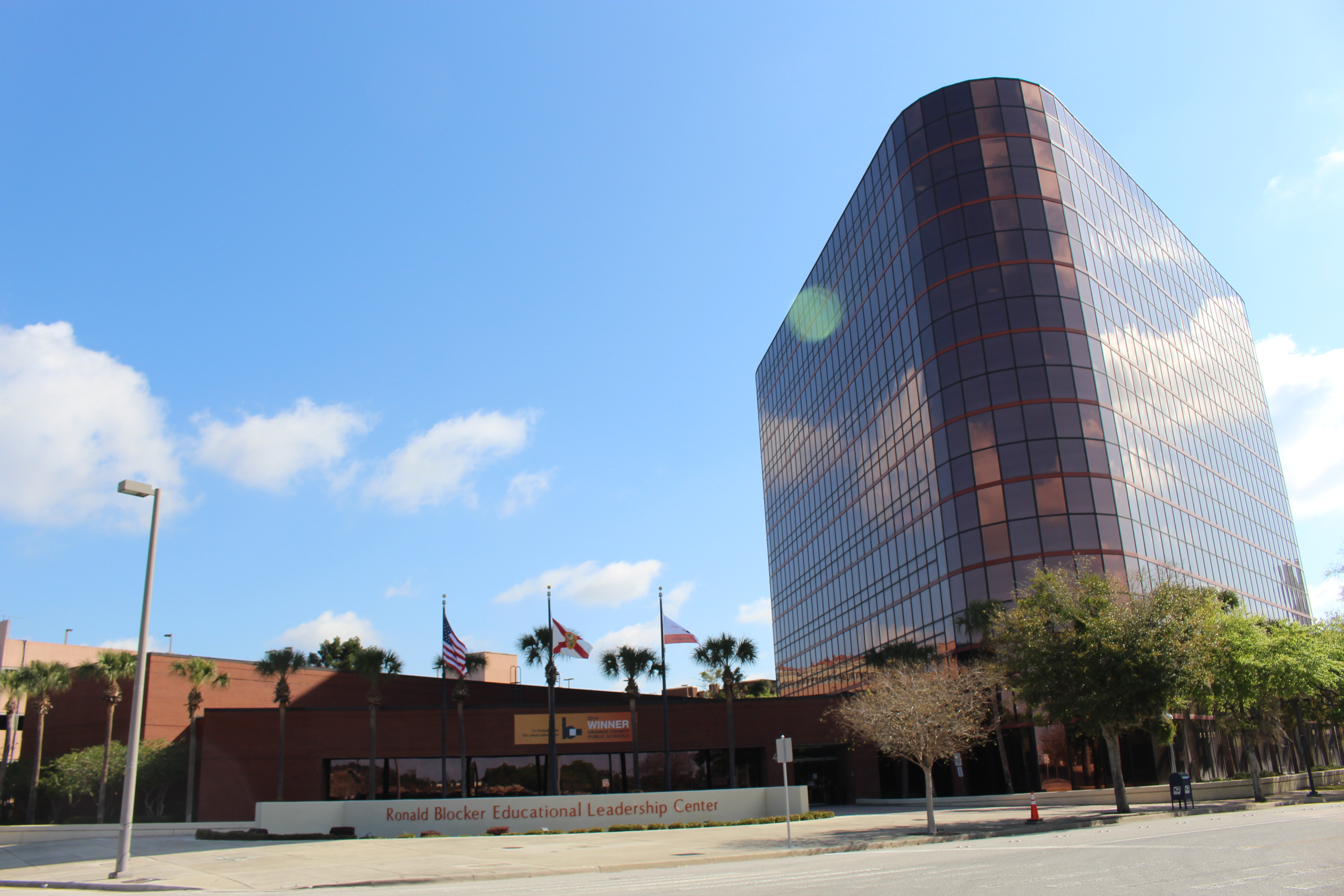
Ronald Blocker Educational Leadership Center, the headquarters for Orange County Public Schools

=== Public education ===
The Orange County Public Schools deliver public education to students countywide. Its functions and expenditures are overseen by an elected school board composed of a chairman, elected at-large; and seven members, elected from single-member districts. Each member is elected to a four-year term: the chairman and three other members are elected in gubernatorial election years, while the other four are elected in presidential election years. As of the 2021–2022 school year, the school system operated 205 schools (127 elementary, 9 K-8, 39 middle, 22 high, and 8 exceptional learning), with 206,246 students. As of 2023, it is the 4th largest district statewide and eighth largest in the nation.

Orange County School Board
Position	Incumbent	Next election
Chairman	Teresa Jacobs	2026
District 1	Angie Gallo	2026
District 2	Maria Salamanca	2026
District 3	Alicia Farrant	2026
District 4	Pam Gould	2024
District 5	Vicki-Elaine Felder	2024
District 6	Karen Castor-Dentel	2024
District 7	Melissa Byrd	2022

=== Colleges and universities ===
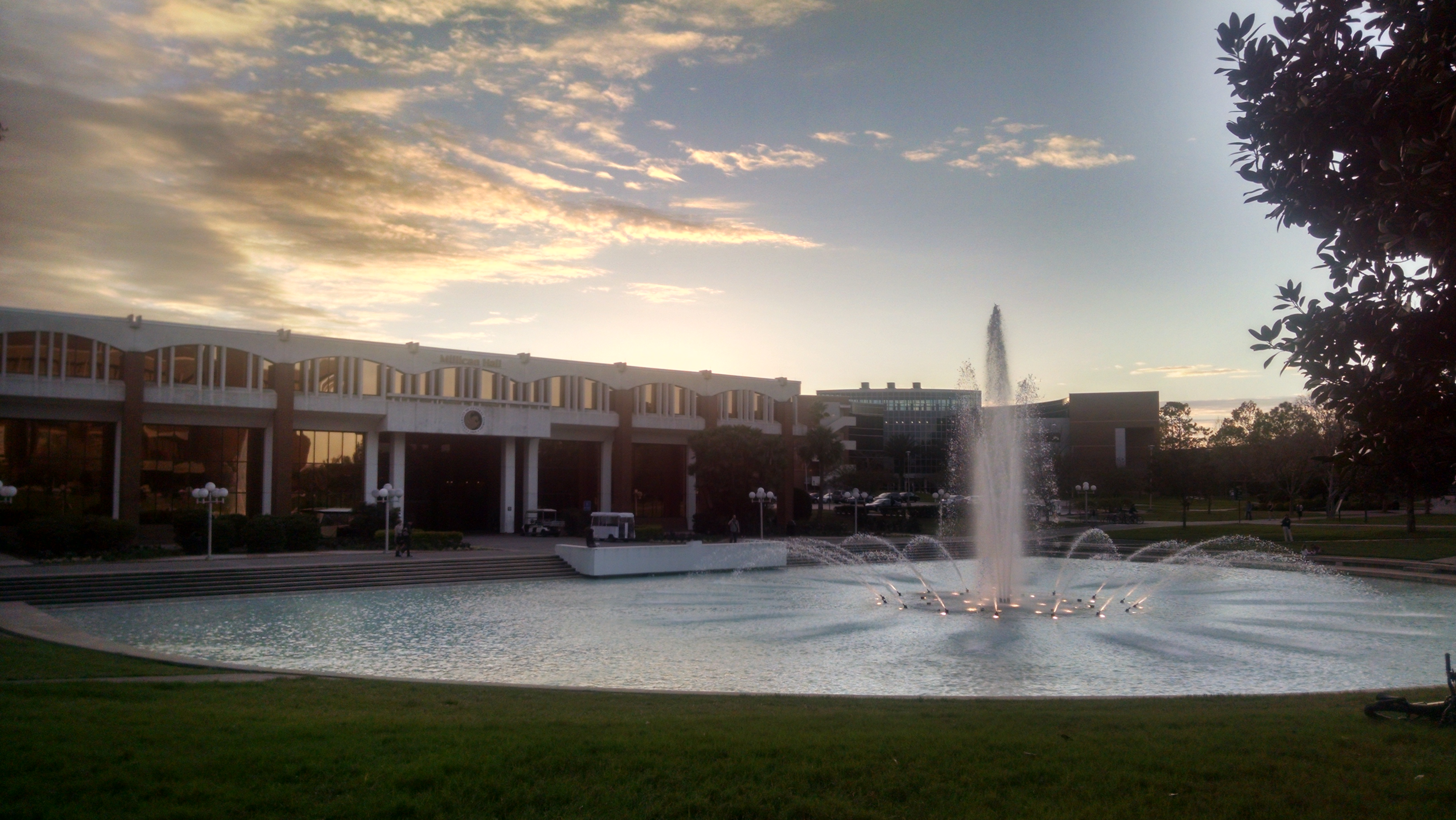
University of Central Florida

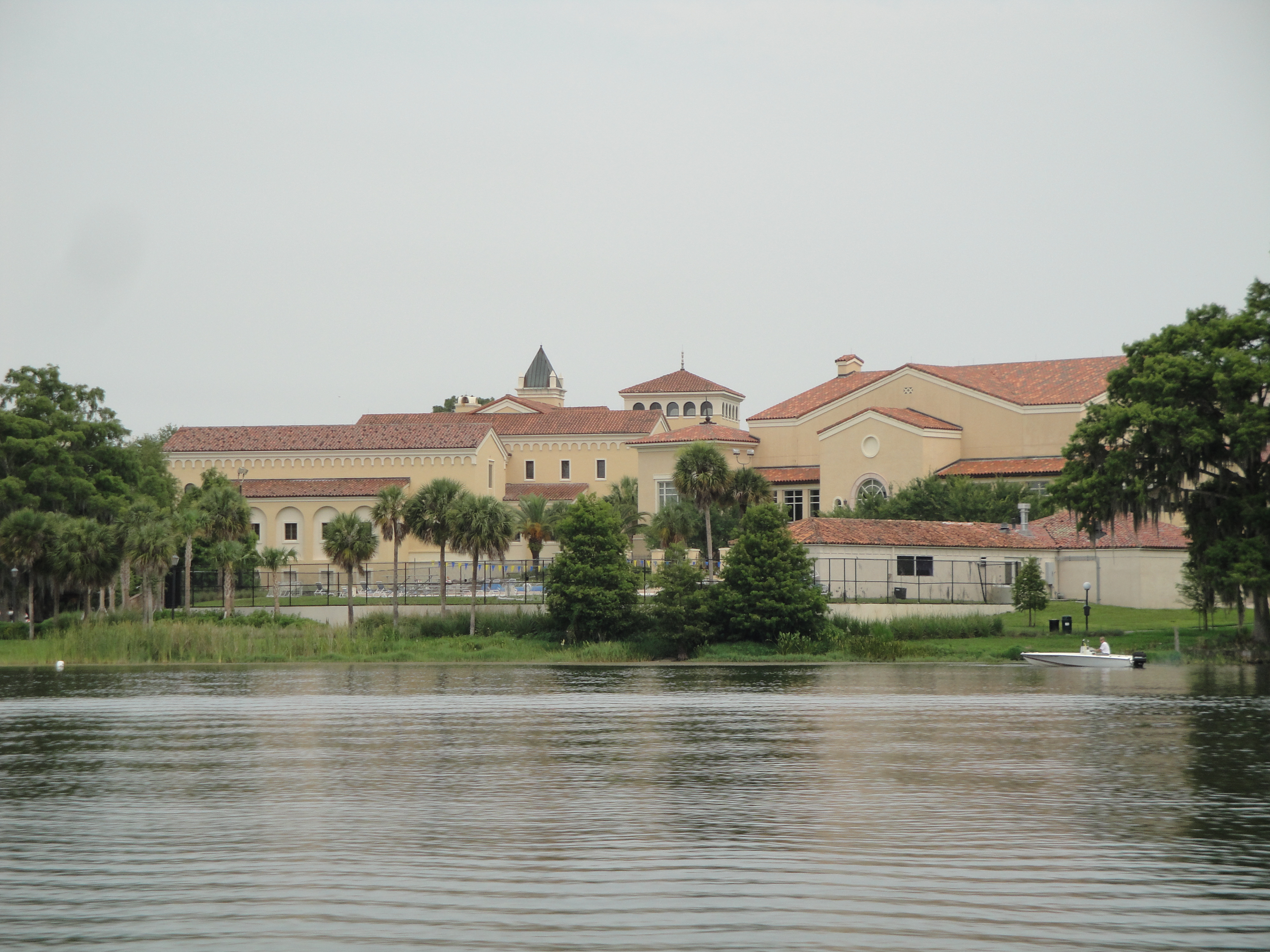
Rollins College

The University of Central Florida is the sole 4-year public university. As of the Fall 2020 semester, a total of 71,948 students attended the university, making it the largest university in the nation by enrollment. The university's 1,415 acre main campus is situated in northeast Orange County.

Nearby Winter Park is home to Rollins College, a private college situated only a few miles from Downtown Orlando. In 2012, it was ranked #1 by U.S. News & World Report amongst regional universities in the South.

With six campuses spread throughout the county, Valencia College offers two-year degree programs, as well three baccalaureate programs.

The law schools for Barry University and Florida A&M are also conveniently located in Downtown Orlando.

Full Sail University is a for-profit university in Winter Park, Florida. Full Sail is not regionally accredited, but is nationally accredited by the Accrediting Commission of Career Schools and Colleges (ACCSC) to award associate's, bachelor's degrees, and master's degrees in audio, film, design, computer animation, business, and other fields.[10] The school offers 35 degree programs and 2 graduate certificates and has a student population of more than 16,800.

== Libraries ==
Orange County is served by the Orange County Library System, which was established in 1923. Before the opening of the Albertson Public Library in 1923, a circulating library maintained by the Sorosis Club of Orlando offered book lending services to patrons on a subscription basis. The Albertson Public Library was established with the collection of Captain Charles L. Albertson and the library was named in his honor. In 1924, the Booker T. Washington Branch of the Albertson Library was established to service the African American community of Orlando. In 1966, the current Orlando Public Library building was completed on the grounds of the Albertson Public Library. Currently there are 16 libraries within the Orange County Library system. The library systems offers a diverse selection of materials, free programs and free access to various databases. In addition, the library offers free delivery of most items through its MAYL service.

One exception exists in the cities of Maitland and Winter Park which are each part of a separate library taxing districts and as a result residents of these cities are not entitled to receive resident borrowing privileges at OCLS branches even though they are technically and legally residents of Orange County, instead an agreement was reached between Maitland, Winter Park and the OCLS whereas a resident of those cities can go to any OCLS branch and request a "Reciprocal borrower card" which is provided free of charge. The Reciprocal borrower cards is valid for one year and can be used at any OCLS branch with the exception of the Melrose Center at the Orlando Public Library which requires a separate Melrose Center specific card which is issued after the user applies for the card and goes through a mandatory orientation class. Access to the OCLS Internet on library owned PCs requires a Reciprocal borrower to pay small session access fee. The OCLS Wi-Fi network which is available at all branches remains free of charge to all users including Reciprocal borrowers and visitors who use their own iPad, Mac, PC, Smartphone or tablet devices. Maitland and Winter Park Library do not provide reciprocal privileges to OCLS patrons and charge non-residents a yearly user fee.

== Sites of interest ==
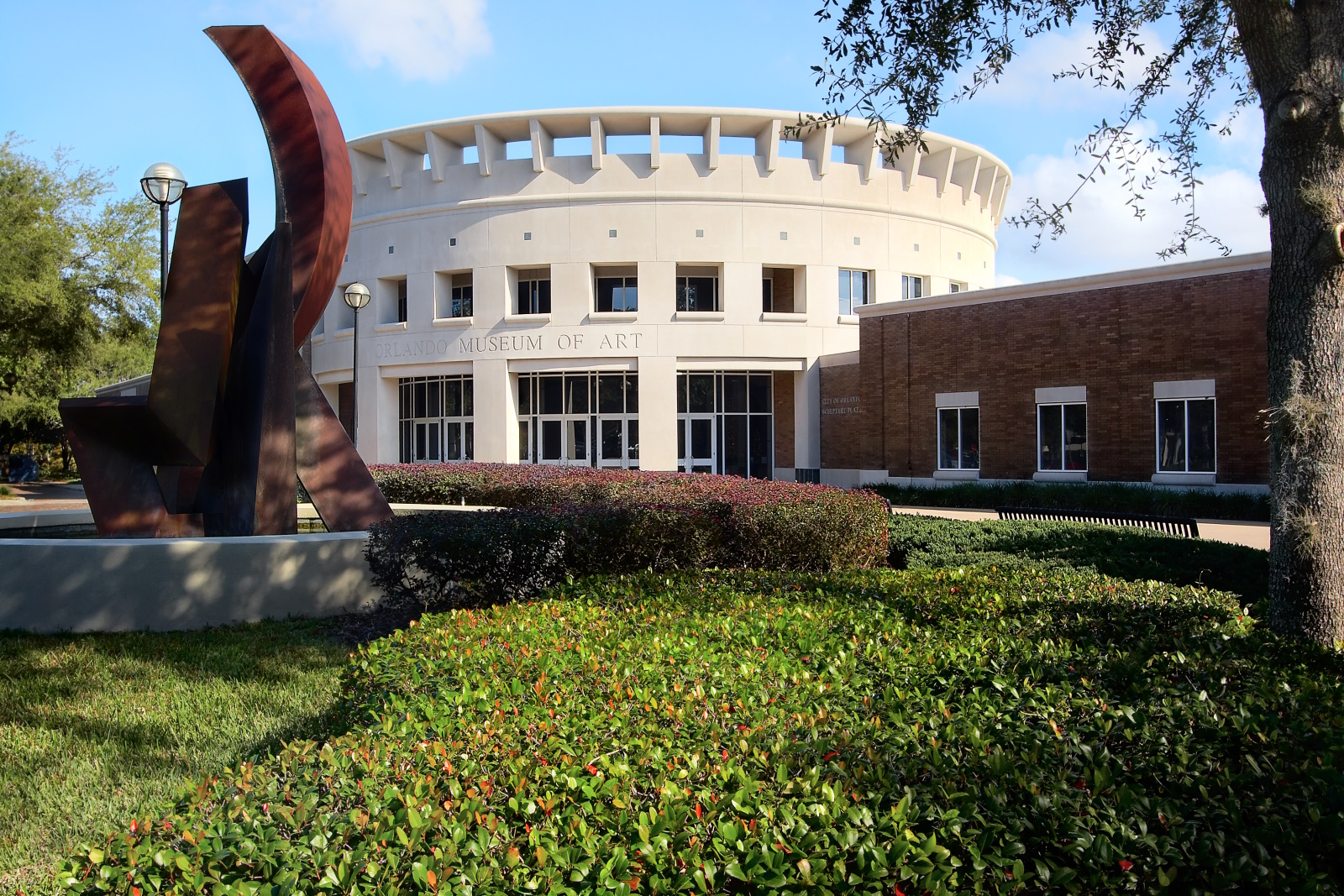
Orlando Museum of Art is located in the community of Mills 50

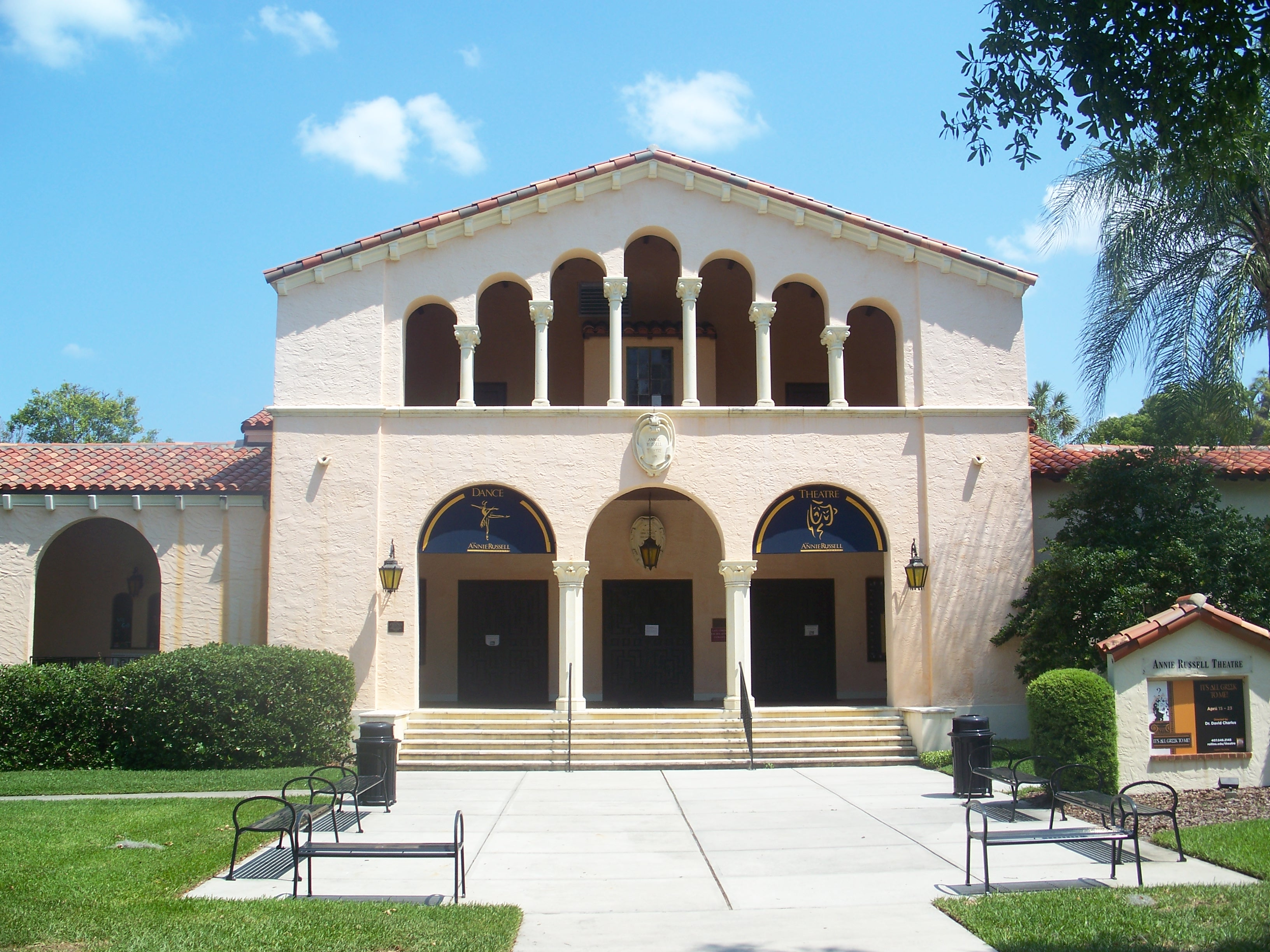
Annie Russell Theatre is an historic theater located in Winter Park on the campus of Rollins College

=== Museums ===
- Albin Polasek House and Studio
- Casa Feliz
- Central Florida Railroad Museum
- Charles Hosmer Morse Museum of American Art
- Corporal Larry E. Smedley National Vietnam War Museum
- Crealdé School of Art
- Maitland Historical Museum
- Maitland Telephone Museum
- Mennello Museum of American Art
- Museum of the Apopkans
- Orange County Regional History Center
- Orlando Museum of Art
- Orlando Science Center
- Pulse Memorial and Museum (still in development, as of 2024)
- Randall Made Knives
- Ripley's Believe It or Not!
- Rollins Museum of Art
- Well'sbuilt Hotel
- William H. Waterhouse House
- Winter Garden Heritage Foundation
- Winter Park Historical Museum
- Withers-Maguire House
- WonderWorks
- Zora Neale Hurston Museum of Fine Arts

=== Culture and wildlife ===
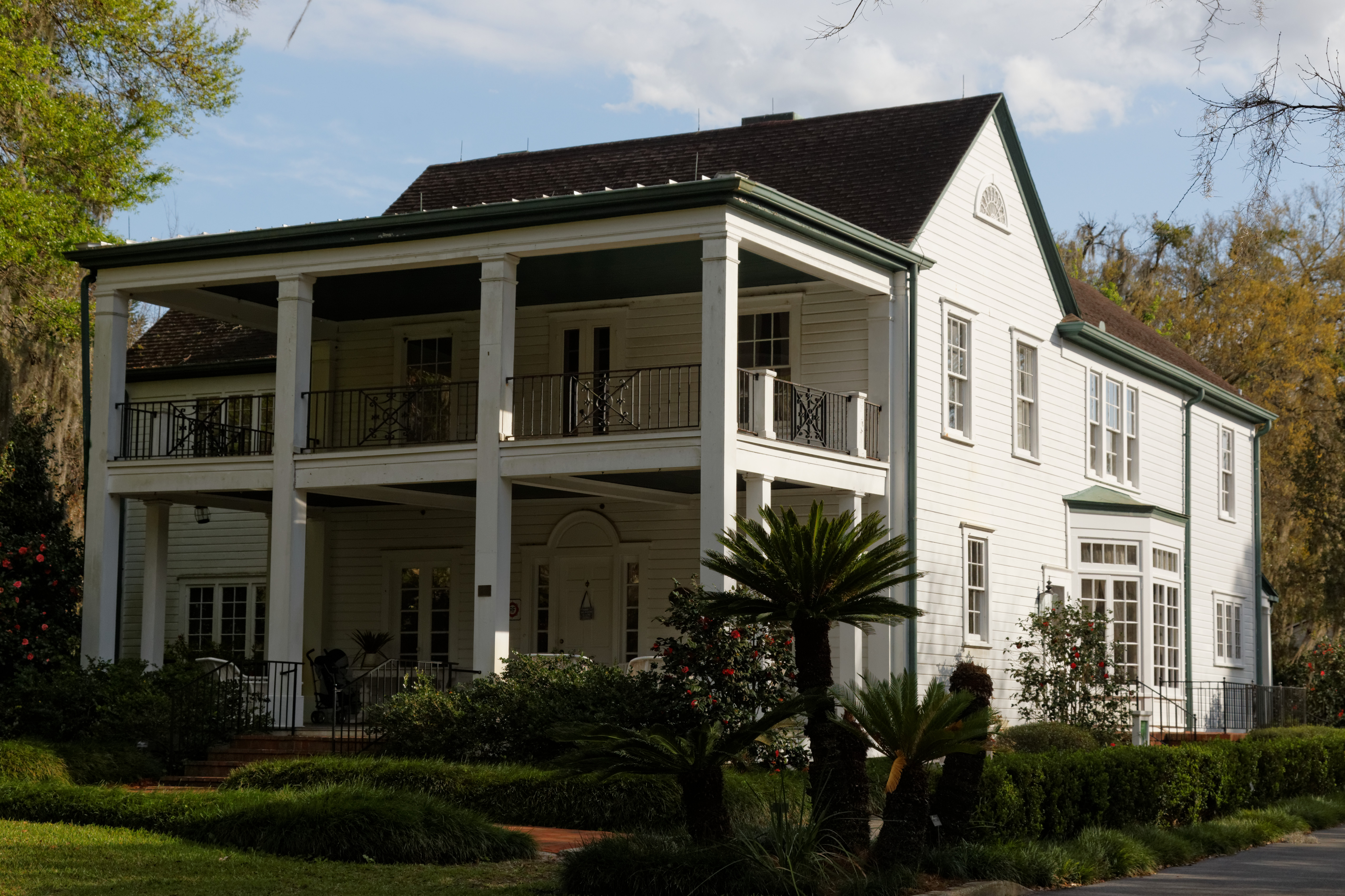
Harry P. Leu Gardens, with 50 acres (200,000 m^{2}) of semi-tropical and tropical gardens, is designated as an historic district, containing landscaped grounds, three historic buildings, lakes, and nature trails

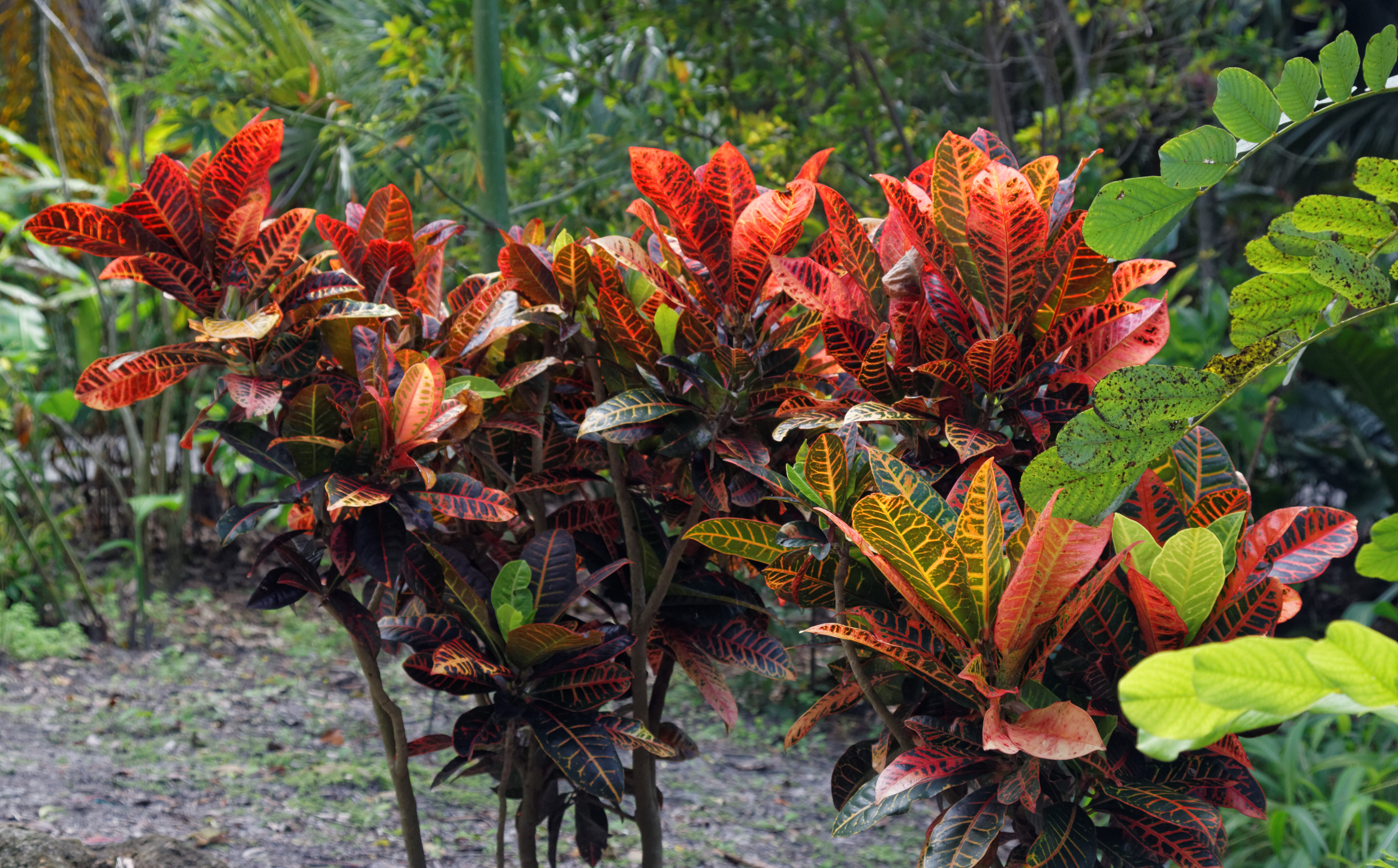

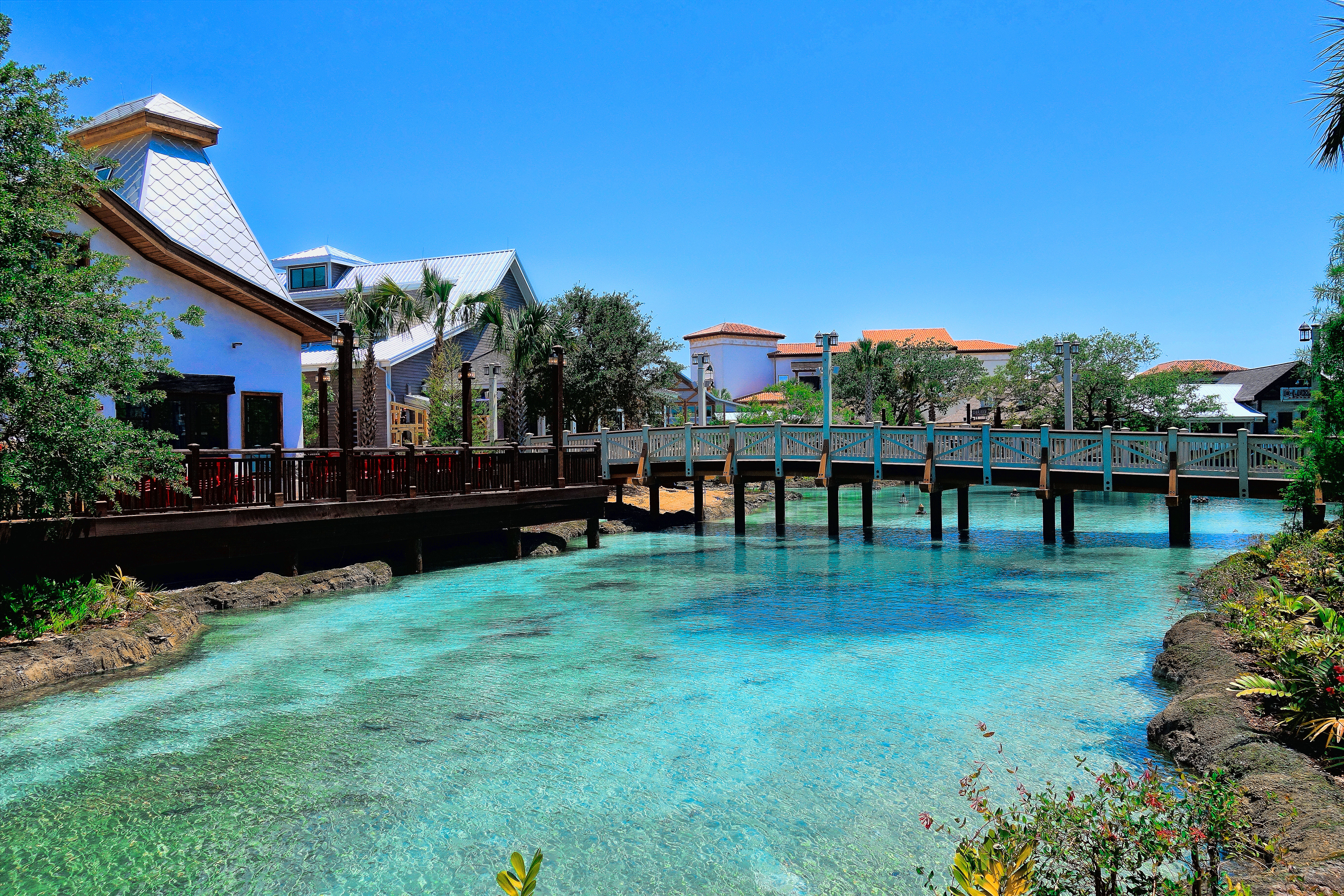
Disney Springs

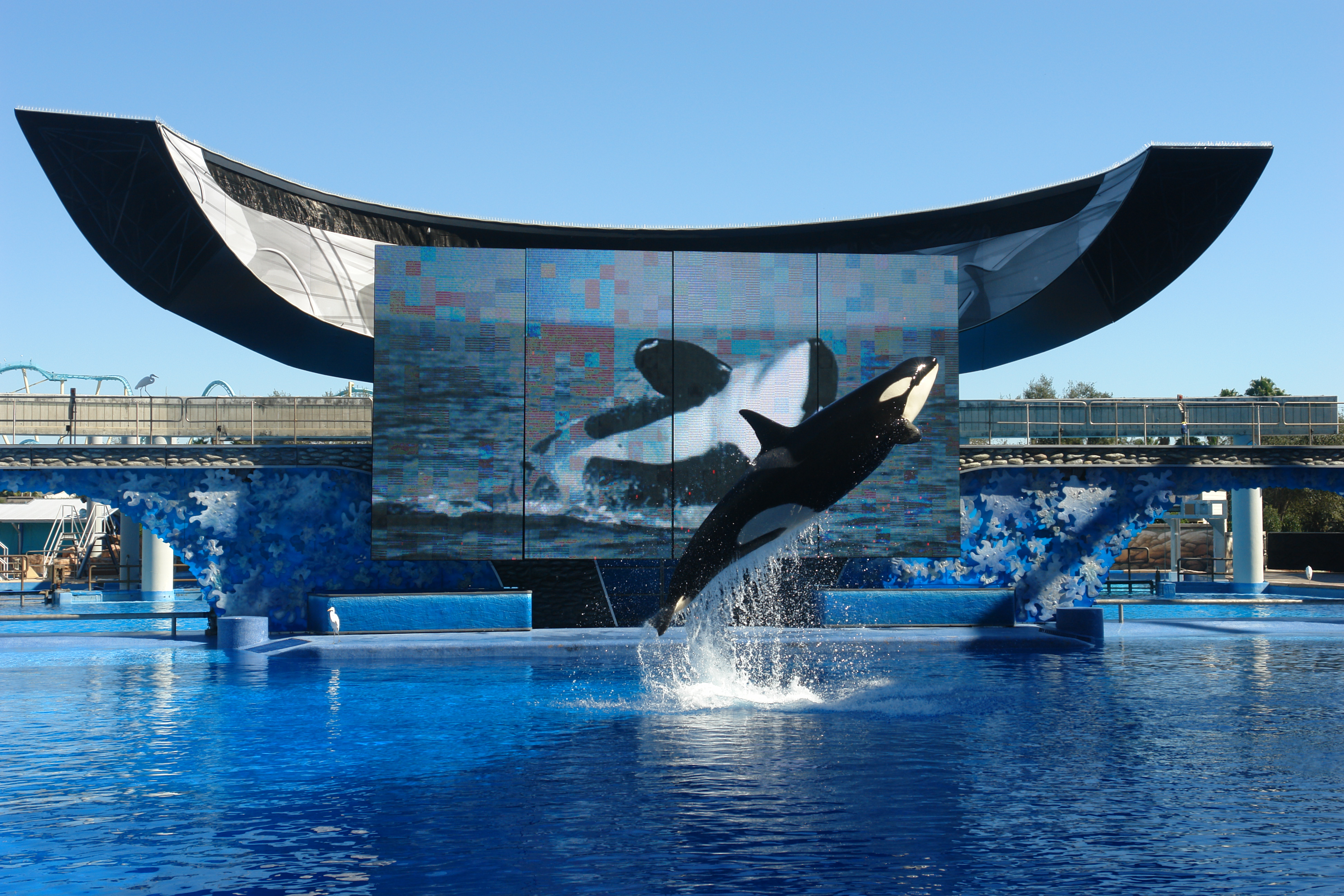
SeaWorld Orlando

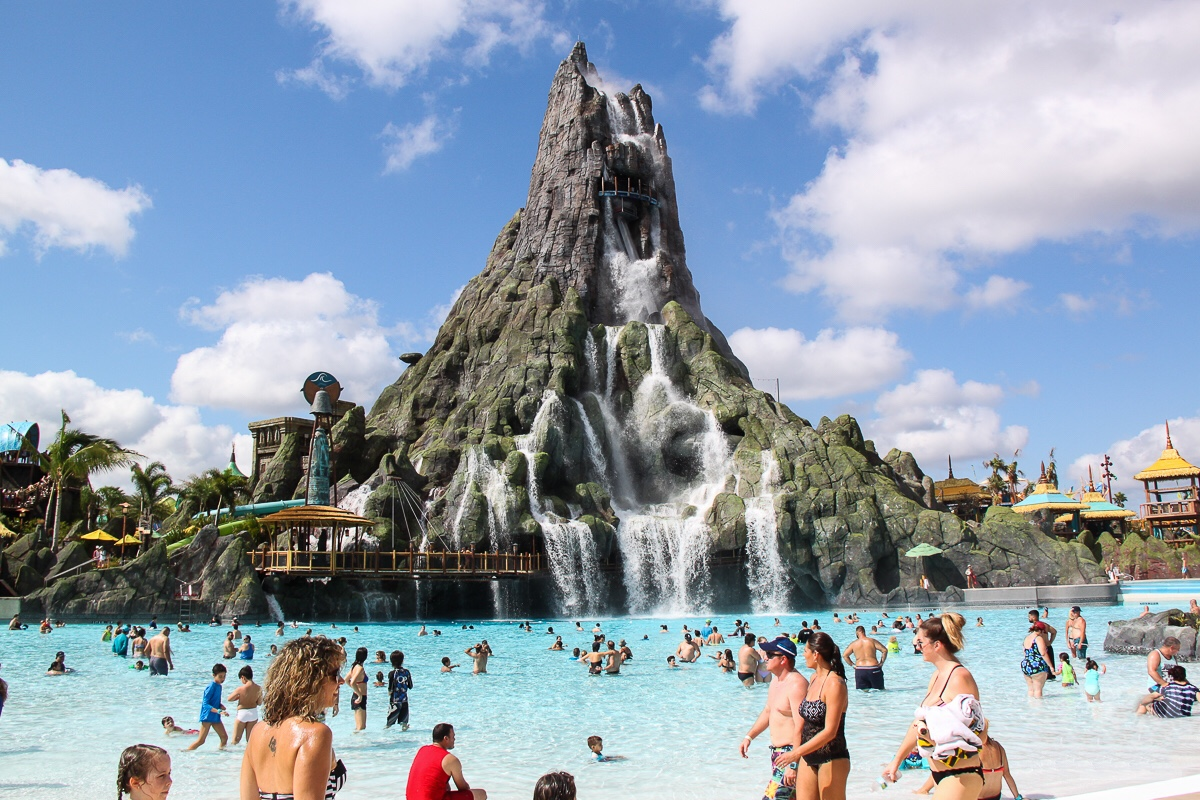
Universal Volcano Bay, a tropical-themed water park at Universal Orlando Resort

- Annie Russell Theatre
- Beacham Theatre
- Bob Carr Theater
- Dr. Phillips Center for the Performing Arts
- Dr. Phillips House
- Enzian Theater
- Garden Theatre
- Gatorland
- Harry P. Leu Gardens
- Hollywood Hills Amphitheater
- Kraft Azalea Park
- Palm Cottage Gardens
- The Plaza Live
- Sci-Fi Dine-In Theater Restaurant
- Universal Music Plaza Stage

=== Themed attractions ===
- Walt Disney World
  - Magic Kingdom
  - Epcot
  - Disney's Hollywood Studios
  - Disney's Animal Kingdom
  - Disney's Typhoon Lagoon
  - Disney's Blizzard Beach
  - Disney Springs
  - Flamingo Crossings
  - Disney's BoardWalk
  - Winter Summerland
  - ESPN Wide World of Sports Complex
- Fun Spot America
- SeaWorld Orlando
  - Discovery Cove
  - Aquatica
- Icon Park
  - Madame Tussauds
- Universal Orlando
  - Universal Studios Florida
  - Universal Islands of Adventure
  - Universal Volcano Bay
  - Universal Epic Universe
  - Universal CityWalk

=== Parks ===
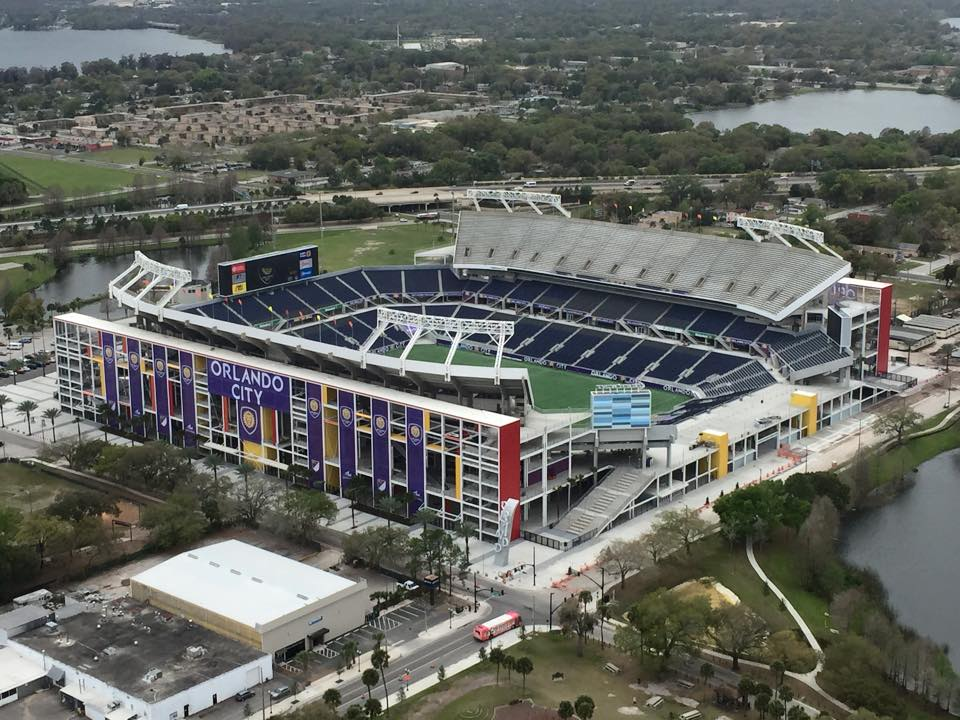
Camping World Stadium is an outdoor stadium located west of downtown. It is the current home venue of the Citrus Bowl and the Pop-Tarts Bowl. It is also the regular host of other college football games including the Florida Classic between Florida A&M and Bethune-Cookman, the MEAC/SWAC Challenge, and the Camping World Kickoff

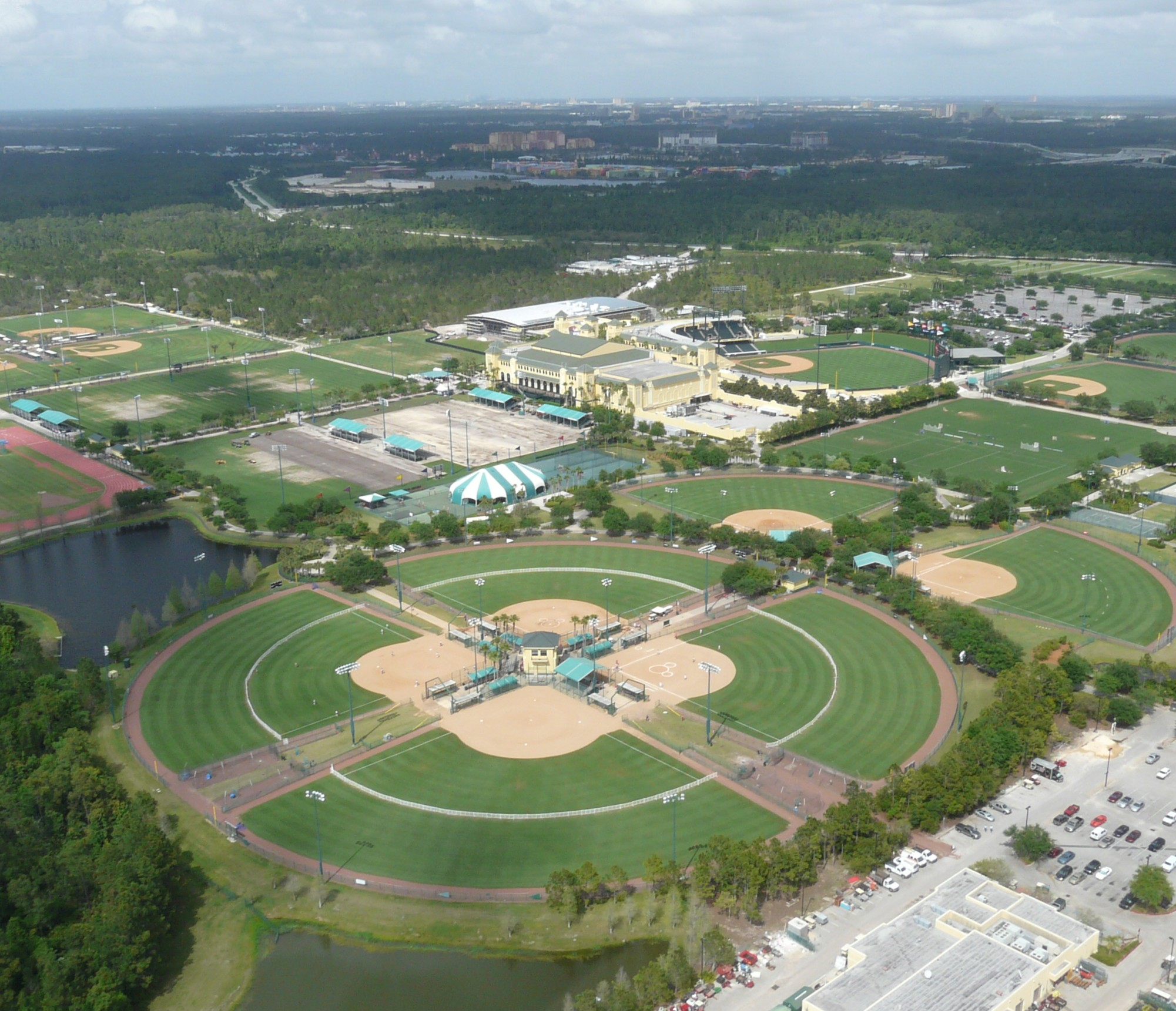
ESPN Wide World of Sports Complex is a 220-acre (89 ha) sports complex located at Walt Disney World in Bay Lake

- B-52 Memorial Park
- Cady Way Trail
- Crosby Island Marsh Preserve
- Downey Park
- Fort Christmas Historical Park
- Hal Scott Preserve
- Kelly Park/Rock Springs Run
- Lake Apopka Loop Trail
- Lake Eola Park
- Little Econ Greenway
- Moss Park
- Pine Hills Trail
- Split Oak Forest
- Tibet-Butler Preserve
- Tom Staley Historical Park
- Wekiwa Springs State Park
- West Orange Trail

=== Sports venues ===
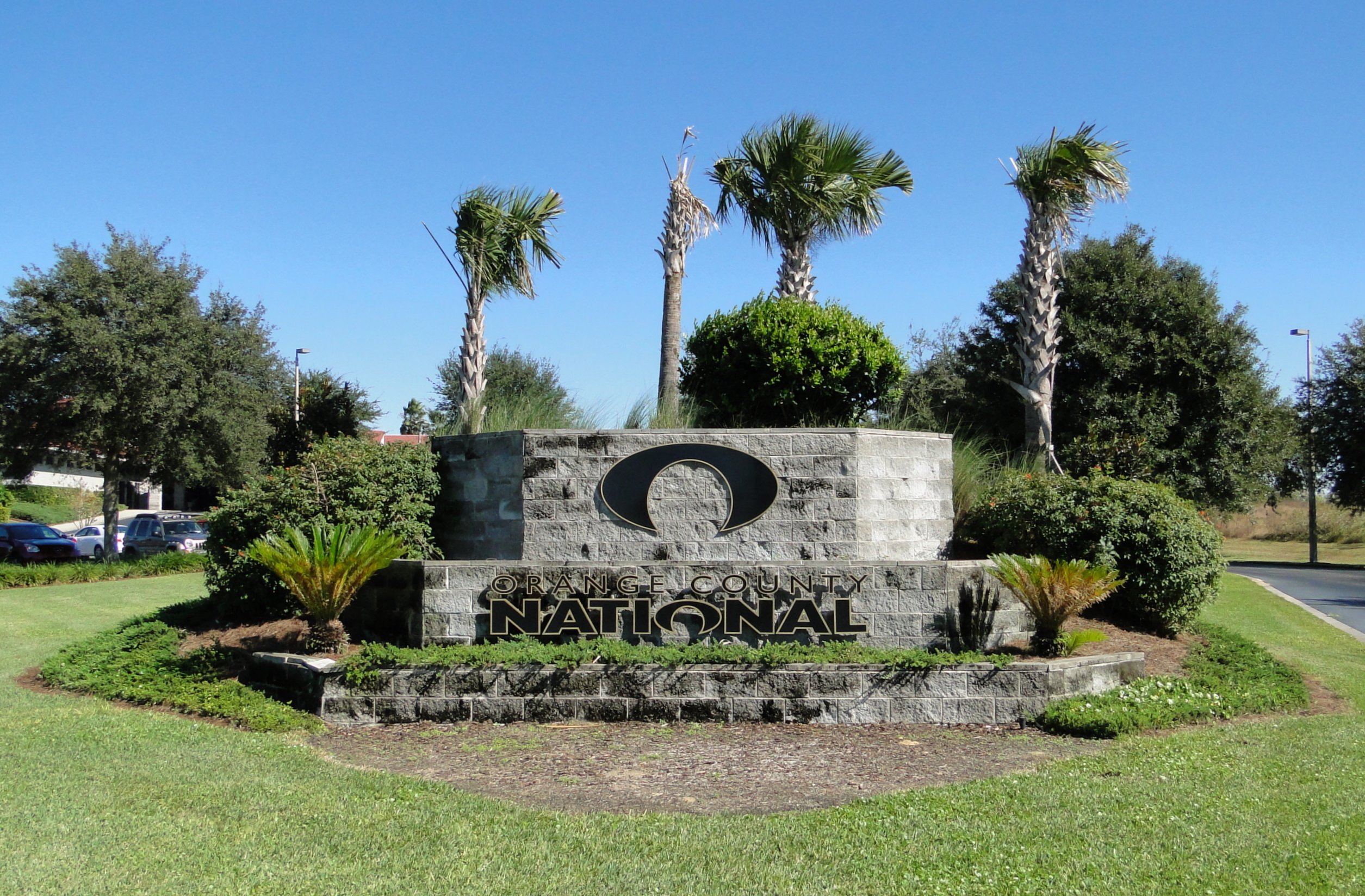
Orange County National Golf Center in Winter Garden

- Addition Financial Arena - Located on the main campus of UCF, it is the home to the UCF Knights men's and women's basketball teams
- Camping World Stadium - The current home venue of the Citrus Bowl and the Pop-Tarts Bowl
- FBC Mortgage Stadium - Located on the main campus of UCF, it is the home field of the UCF Knights football team of NCAA Division I FBS college football
- Inter.co Stadium - The home stadium for the Orlando City SC (MLS) and Orlando Pride (NWSL) soccer teams
- Kia Center – The home venue for the Orlando Magic (NBA basketball), Orlando Solar Bears (ECHL ice hockey), and the Orlando Predators (AFL indoor American football
- The Stadium at the ESPN Wide World of Sports
- The Venue at UCF - Located on the main campus of UCF, it is home to UCF's volleyball team

=== Golf courses ===
- Bay Hill Club and Lodge
- Eagle Creek Golf Club
- Lake Nona Golf & Country Club
- Orange County National Golf Center
- Rio Pinar Country Club
- Winter Park Country Club and Golf Course

== Transportation ==
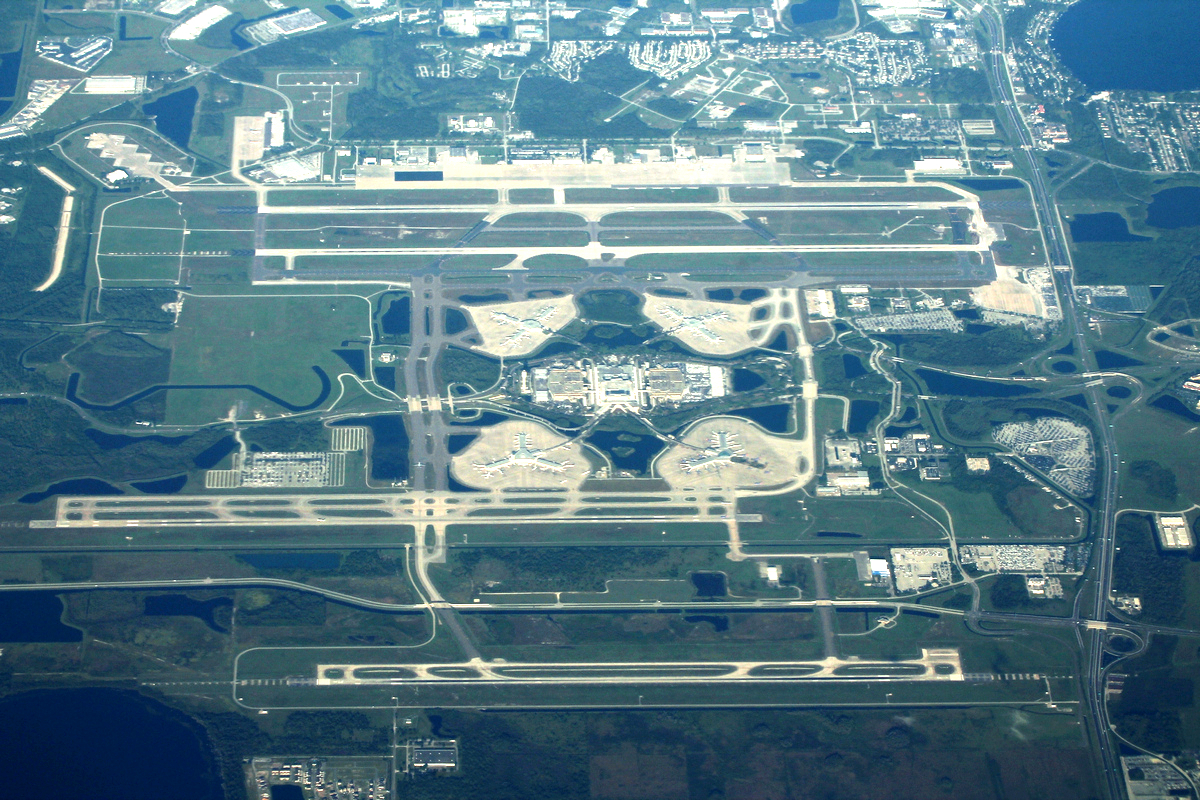
Orlando International Airport

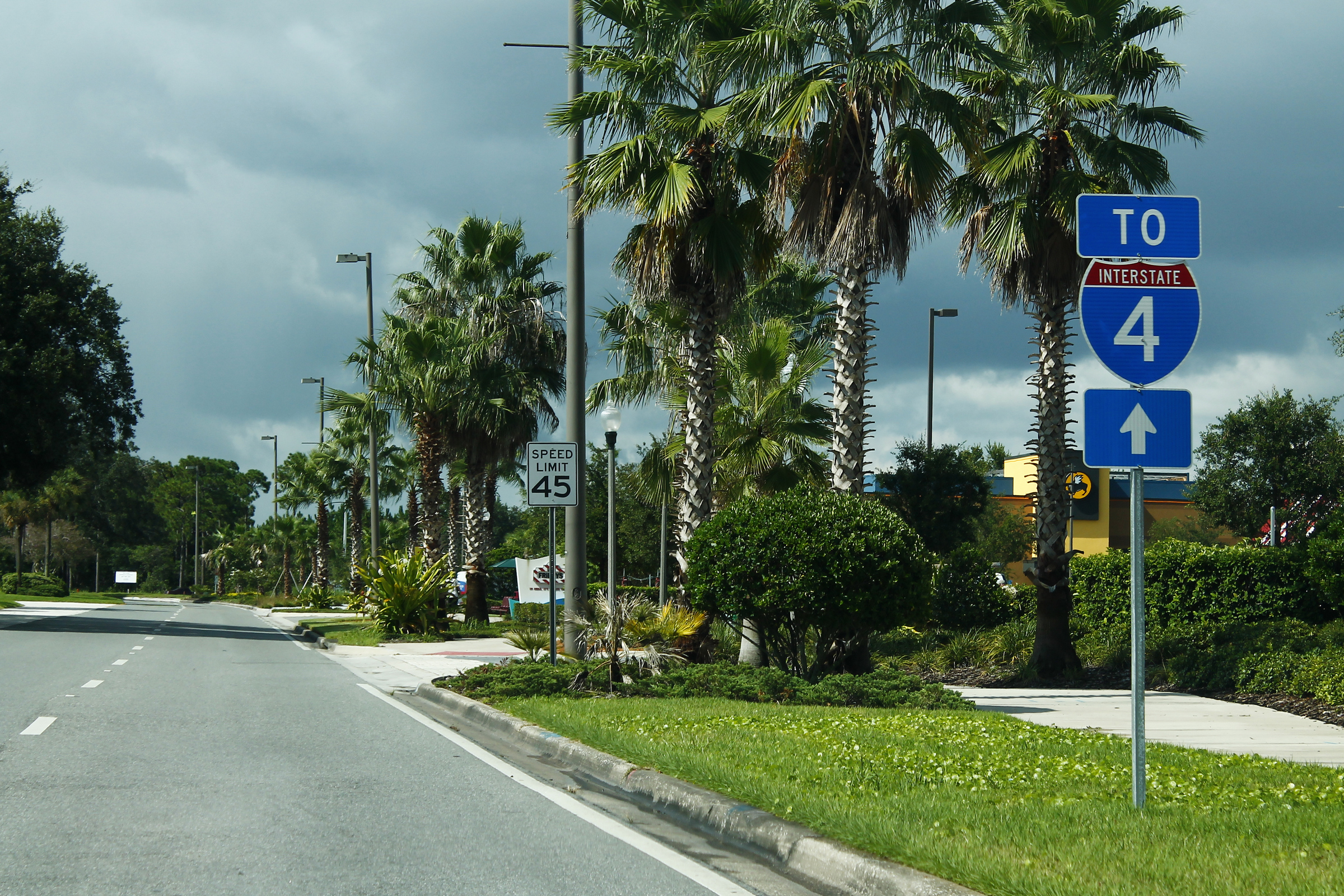
International Drive north to Interstate 4

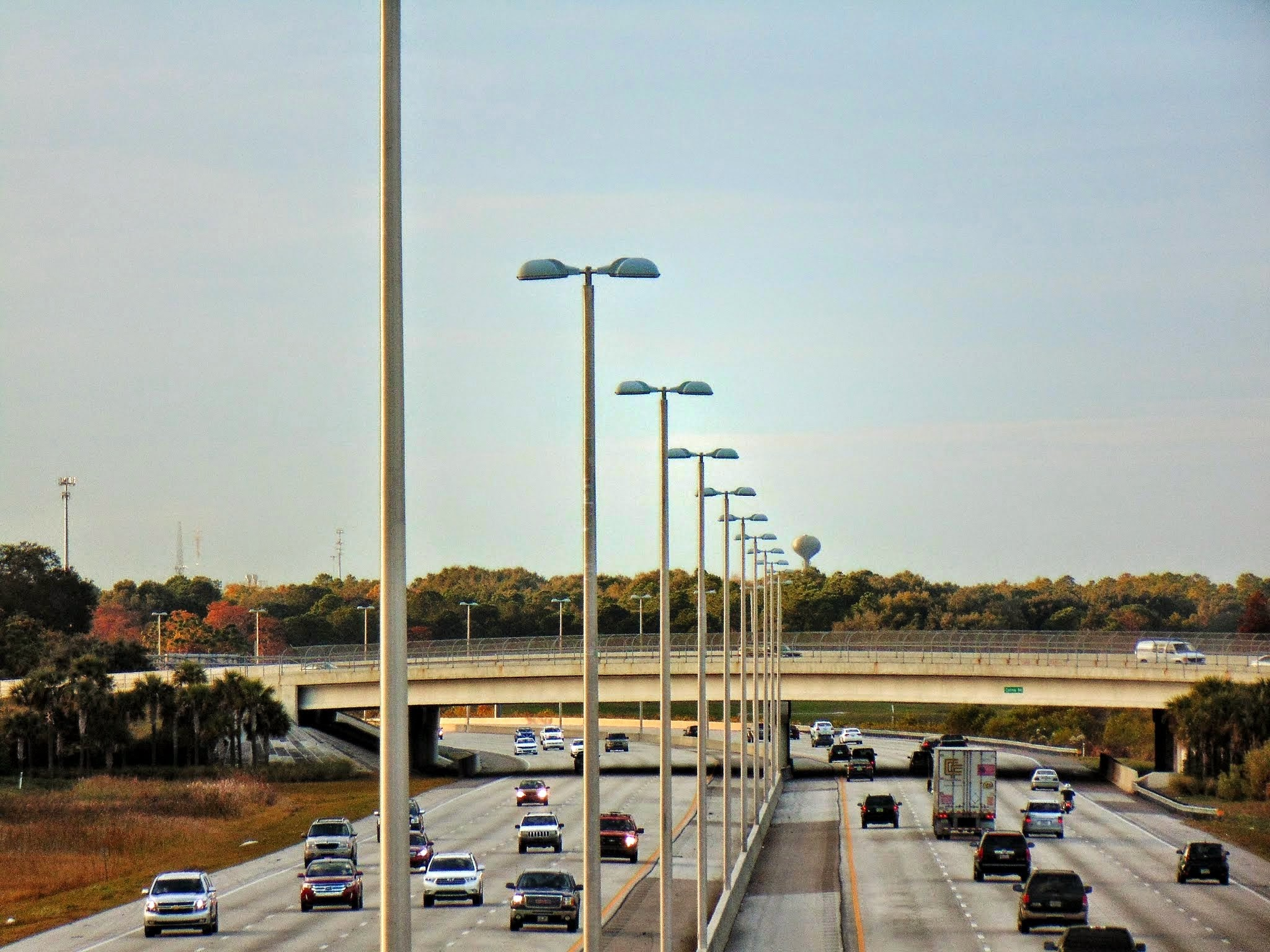
Florida's Turnpike

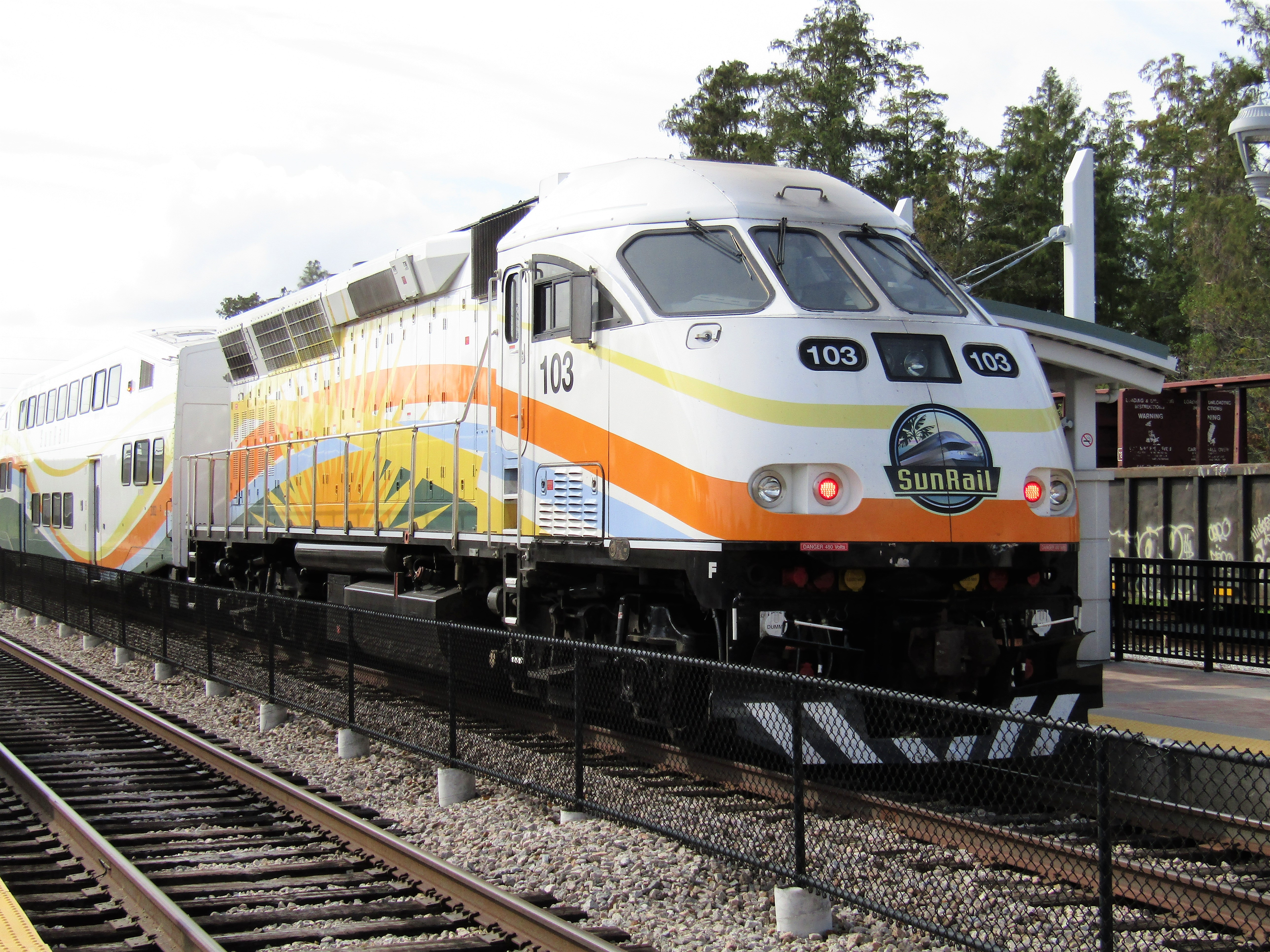
SunRail at the Sand Lake Road station

=== Airports ===
- Orlando Apopka Airport, a privately owned uncontrolled, public-use airport in the City of Apopka which serves small private aircraft, there is no commercial service.
- Orlando Executive Airport, a public airport owned by GOAA which serves private jets and small aircraft. It is a reliever airport for Orlando International Airport.
- Orlando International Airport, the busiest airport in Florida by passenger traffic, is a public international airport owned by GOAA serving both commercial and private aircraft.

=== Major highways ===
- I-4
- Florida's Turnpike
- International Drive
- US 17 / US 92
- US 192 (Irlo Bronson Memorial Highway)
- US 441 (Orange Blossom Trail)
- SR 15
- SR 50 (Colonial Drive)
- SR 408 (East–West Expressway)
- SR 414 (John Land Apopka Expressway)
- SR 417 (Central Florida GreeneWay)
- SR 423 (John Young Parkway)
- SR 426 (Fairbanks Avenue/ Aloma Avenue)
- SR 429 (Western Expressway)
- SR 435 (Kirkman Road)
- SR 436 (Semoran Boulevard)
- SR 438 (Princeton Street)
- SR 451
- SR 453
- SR 482 (Sand Lake Road)
- SR 500
- SR 520
- SR 527 (Orange Avenue)
- SR 528 (Beachline Expressway)
- SR 535 (Apopka-Vineland Road)
- SR 536 (World Center Drive)
- SR 551 (Goldenrod Road)

=== Public transportation ===
- Amtrak a nationwide rail service with two stations in Orange County, Orlando and Winter Park
- Brightline, a high-speed rail line which operates service from Orlando International Airport to West Palm Beach, Fort Lauderdale and Miami which started on September 22, 2023
- Greyhound a U.S. Intercity common carrier bus company providing nationwide service from Orlando.
- Lynx a public bus authority providing service in Orange County and five additional Central Florida counties including Lake, Osceola, Polk, Seminole and Volusia.
- SunRail a commuter rail service with eight stations serving Orange County and eight additional stations in three adjacent counties (Osceola, Volusia and Seminole).

== Communities ==
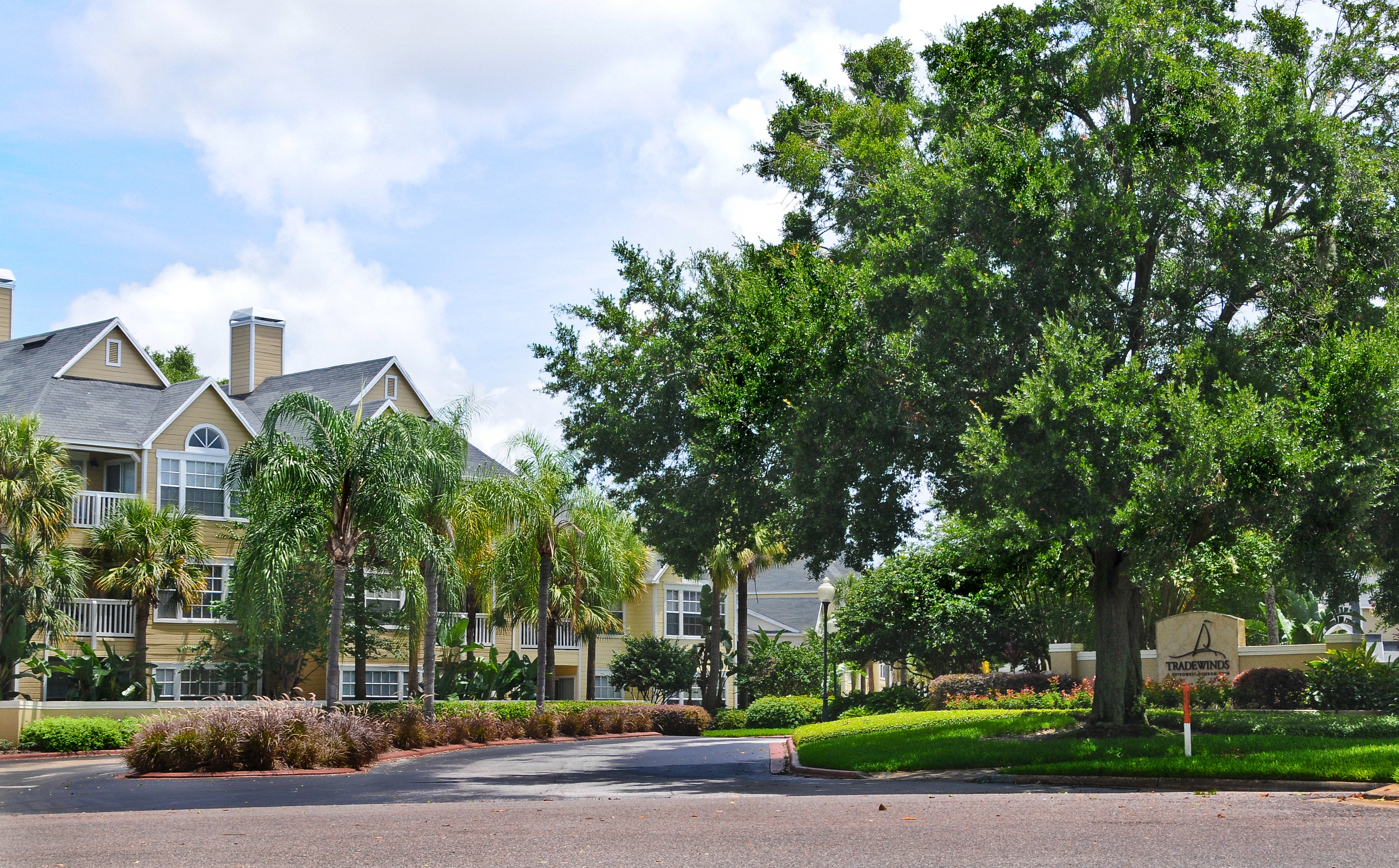
The Tradewinds condominiums on S. Hiawassee Rd in MetroWest

=== Cities ===
- Apopka
- Bay Lake
- Belle Isle
- Edgewood
- Lake Buena Vista
- Maitland
- Ocoee
- Orlando
- Winter Garden
- Winter Park

=== Towns ===
- Eatonville
- Oakland
- Windermere

=== Census-designated places ===
- Alafaya
- Azalea Park
- Bay Hill
- Bithlo
- Christmas
- Clarcona
- Conway
- Dr. Phillips
- Fairview Shores
- Four Corners
- Goldenrod
- Gotha
- Holden Heights
- Holden Lakes
- Horizon West
- Hunter's Creek
- Lake Butler
- Lake Hart
- Lake Mary Jane
- Lockhart
- Meadow Woods
- Oak Ridge
- Orlo Vista
- Paradise Heights
- Pine Castle
- Pine Hills
- Rio Pinar
- Sky Lake
- South Apopka
- Southchase
- Taft
- Tangelo Park
- Tangerine
- Tildenville
- Union Park
- University
- Wedgefield
- Williamsburg
- Zellwood

=== Other unincorporated communities ===
- Andover Lakes
- Chinatown
- Fairvilla
- Killarney
- Plymouth
- Reedy Creek Improvement District
- Vineland

== See also ==
- Innovation Way
- List of amusement parks in Central Florida
- List of tallest buildings in Orlando
- Mayor of Orange County
- National Register of Historic Places listings in Orange County, Florida
- Board of County Commissioners
- Orange County Health Department
- Teresa Jacobs
- Walt Before Mickey, a locally shot film about Walt Disney creating Mickey Mouse
