= List of rail trails in Florida =

This list of rail trails in Florida lists former railroad rights-of-way in the State of Florida that have been converted to rail trails for public use.

== Trails ==
Trail name	Length	Location	Original Rail Road
Auburndale TECO Trail	?	Polk County	Florida Western and Northern Railroad (Seaboard Air Line Railroad)
Blackwater Heritage State Trail	9.6 miles (15.4 km)	Santa Rosa County	Florida and Alabama Railroad (Bagdad Land and Lumber Company)
Blountstown Greenway Bike Path	3.4 miles (5.5 km)	Calhoun County	Marianna and Blountstown Railroad
Boca Grande Bike Path	6.5 miles (10.5 km)	Gasparilla Island and Boca Grande, Florida	Charlotte Harbor and Northern Railway (Seaboard Air Line Railroad)
Cady Way Trail	6.5 miles (10.5 km)	Orange County	East Florida and Atlantic Railroad (Seaboard Air Line Railroad)
Cape Haze Pioneer Trail	11.5 miles (18.5 km)	Charlotte County	Charlotte Harbor and Northern Railway (Seaboard Air Line Railroad)
Chain of Lakes Trail	4.7 miles (7.6 km)	Polk County	South Florida Railroad--Bartow Branch (Atlantic Coast Line Railroad)
Cross Seminole Trail	23 miles (37 km)	Seminole County	Sanford and Indian River Railroad (Atlantic Coast Line Railroad)
Cross Town Trail	3.1 miles (5.0 km)	Citrus County	Silver Springs, Ocala and Gulf Railroad (Atlantic Coast Line Railroad)
Dinky Line Trail	?	Orange County	Orlando and Winter Park Railway (Seaboard Air Line Railroad)
Dunnellon Trail	2.5 miles (4.0 km)	Citrus Springs and Dunnellon, Florida	Seaboard Air Line Railroad (Brooksville Subdivision)
East Central Regional Rail Trail	?	Volusia and Brevard Counties	Atlantic Coast, St. Johns and Indian River Railroad (Florida East Coast Railroad)
Florida Keys Overseas Heritage Trail	106 miles (171 km) 2.5	Monroe County	Overseas Railroad (Florida East Coast Railroad)
Fort Fraser Trail	7.75 miles (12.47 km)	Polk County	Lakeland—Fort Myers Line (Atlantic Coast Line Railroad)
Fountain Lake Trail	?	Lake County	Leesburg and Indian River Railroad and Tavares, Orlando and Atlantic Railroad (Seaboard Air Line Railroad)
Four Freedoms Trail	12 miles (19 km)	Madison County	Florida Midland and Georgia Railroad (Valdosta Southern Railroad)
Gainesville-Hawthorne Trail State Park	16 miles (26 km)	Alachua County	Florida Southern Railway (Atlantic Coast Line Railroad)
General James A. Van Fleet State Trail	29.2 miles (47.0 km)	Polk, Lake, and Sumter Counties	Florida Western and Northern Railroad (Seaboard Air Line Railroad)
Georgia Florida and Alabama Trail	?	Franklin, Wakulla and Leon, Counties	Georgia, Florida and Alabama Railroad
Goldsboro Pedestrian and Bicycle Trail	1.7 miles (2.7 km)	Sanford	???????????????????????????????????? (Atlantic Coast Line Railroad)
Good Neighbor Trail	10.7 miles (17.2 km)	Hernando County	Florida Southern Railway—Brooksville Branch (Atlantic Coast Line Railroad)
Hardy Trail	1 mile (1.6 km)	Pasco County	Florida Central and Peninsular Railroad (Seaboard Air Line Railroad)
Heritage Trail	?	Suwannee County	Live Oak, Tampa and Charlotte Harbor Railroad (Atlantic Coast Line Railroad)
Jacksonville-Baldwin Rail Trail	26 miles (42 km)	Duval County	Jacksonville and Southwestern Railroad (Atlantic Coast Line Railroad)
John Yarbrough Linear Park	6 miles (9.7 km)	Lee County	Lakeland—Fort Myers Line (Atlantic Coast Line Railroad)
Lake Denham Trail	?	Sumter and Lake Counties	Atlantic Coast Line Railroad -- High Springs—Croom Line
Legacy Trail	18.5 miles (29.8 km)	Sarasota County	Florida West Shore Railway (Seaboard Air Line Railroad)
Ludlam Trail	5.6 miles (9.0 km)	Miami-Dade County,	Florida East Coast Railway—Little River Branch
Monticello Bike Trail	3.1 miles (5.0 km)	Jefferson County	Tallahassee Subdivision -- Monticello Branch (Seaboard Air Line Railroad)
Nature Coast State Trail	31.7 miles (51.0 km)	Dixie, Gilchrist, and Levy Counties	Jacksonville and Southwestern Railroad extension and Perry Cutoff (Atlantic Coast Line Railroad)
O'Leno to Ichetucknee Trail	?	Columbia County	Live Oak, Tampa and Charlotte Harbor Railroad (Atlantic Coast Line Railroad)
Palatka-Lake Butler State Trail		Union, Bradford, Clay, and Putnam Counties	Georgia Southern and Florida Railway (Southern Railway)
Palatka-to-St. Augustine State Trail	19 miles (31 km)	Putnam and St. Johns Counties	Florida East Coast Railroad—Palatka Branch
Pinellas Trail	45 miles (72 km)	Pinellas County	Orange Belt Railway (Atlantic Coast Line Railroad) from Tarpon Springs to Clearwater; Tampa and Gulf Coast Railroad (Seaboard Air Line Railroad) from Clearwater to St. Petersburg
Punta Gorda Linear Park	1 mile (1.6 km)	Charlotte County	Florida Southern Railway (Atlantic Coast Line Railroad)
Seminole-Wekiva Trail	3.3 miles (5.3 km)	Seminole County	Orange Belt Railway (Atlantic Coast Line Railroad)
South Dade Rail Trail	20.5 miles (33.0 km)	Miami-Dade County	Florida East Coast Railway
South Lake Trail	13 miles (21 km)	Lake County	Orange Belt Railway (Atlantic Coast Line Railroad)
Suwannee River Greenway	12.5 miles (20.1 km)	Suwannee County	Live Oak, Tampa and Charlotte Harbor Railroad (Atlantic Coast Line Railroad)
Tallahassee-St. Marks Historic Railroad State Trail	16 miles (26 km)	Leon and Wakulla Counties	Tallahassee Railroad (Seaboard Air Line Railroad)
Tav Lee Trail	?	Leesburg to Eustis	St. Johns and Lake Eustis Railway (Atlantic Coast Line Railroad)
Trenton–Newberry Rail Trail	9.33 miles (15.02 km)	Gilchrist and Alachua Counties	Jacksonville–Wilcox Line (Atlantic Coast Line Railroad)
Upper Tampa Bay Trail	7.25 miles (11.67 km)	Hillsborough County	Tampa and Gulf Coast Railroad-Tarpon Springs Branch (Seaboard Air Line Railroad)
West Orange Trail	22 miles (35 km)	Orange County	Orange Belt Railway (Atlantic Coast Line Railroad)
Wildwood-Leesburg Trail	?	Sumter and Lake Counties	Leesburg and Indian River Railroad (Seaboard Air Line Railroad)
Withlacoochee State Trail	46 miles (74 km)	Pasco, Hernando, and Citrus Counties	Silver Springs, Ocala and Gulf Railroad and Florida Southern Railway (Atlantic Coast Line Railroad)

== See also ==
- List of hiking trails in Florida, for notable non-rail trails
- List of paved Florida bike trails,
- List of trails in Brevard County, Florida
