= List of paved Florida bike trails =

This is a list of paved Florida bike trails. Included in the list are cities that have won awards from the League of American Bicyclists as being a bicycle-friendly community.

== Bicycle-friendly community award winners ==
=== Silver level ===
- Gainesville
- Sanibel
- Venice
- The Villages

=== Bronze level ===
- Boca Raton
- Orlando
- St. Petersburg
- Tallahassee
- Lakeland
- Miami
- Broward County
- Fernandina Beach
- Weston
- Key Biscayne
- Indian River County
- South Lake County
- Cape Coral
- Naples
- Winter Park

== Paved bike trails by area ==
=== Florida Keys ===
- Florida Keys Overseas Heritage Trail - Florida Keys

=== Gainesville ===
Gainesville's trails are connected, and the Waldo Road Greenway, Depot Avenue Trail, Downtown Connector, and Gainesville-Hawthorne trail can be used to provide a 22-mile (35 km) continuous bike trail from the Gainesville Regional Airport to Hawthorne.

- Gainesville-Depot Avenue Trail - Gainesville - 2.1 miles (3.4 km), paved
- Gainesville-Downtown Connector - Gainesville - 1.8 miles (2.9 km), paved (under construction)
- Gainesville-Hawthorne Trail State Park - Gainesville - 16 miles (26 km), paved (asphalt 10’ wide)
- Kermit-Sigmon Trail - Gainesville - Paved
- Gainesville-Waldo Road Greenway - Gainesville - 2.6 miles (4.2 km), paved

=== Jacksonville area ===
- Amelia Island Trail - Amelia Island - 6.2 miles (10.0 km), paved (asphalt 10’ wide)
- Black Creek Trail - Orange Park, Green Cove Springs - 8 miles (13 km), paved (asphalt 10’ wide)
- Jacksonville-Baldwin Rail Trail - Jacksonville, Baldwin - 14.5 miles (23.3 km), paved (asphalt 12’ wide)
- Jekyll Island Trail System - Jekyll Island, Georgia - approximately 25 miles (40 km) in five looped paths; paved
- Keystone Heights multi-use path - Keystone Heights - 5.5 miles (8.9 km), paved (asphalt 10’ wide)

=== Miami Area ===
- Metropath - 10.5 miles (16.9 km), paved connected to the South Dade Rail Trail
- South Dade Rail Trail - a multi-purpose 20.5 miles (33.0 km) asphalt trail from Miami to Homestead, Florida
- Black Creek Trail, Miami-Dade at 100 Florida Trails
- Miami Beach Boardwalk at 100 Florida Trails
- Rickenbacker Trail at 100 Florida Trails

=== Orlando area ===
- Baldwin Park Trail - Orlando - 4.5 miles (7.2 km), paved
- Cady Way Trail - Orlando - 6.3 miles (10.1 km), paved
- Candyland Park Trail - Longwood
- Citrus Trail - Seminole County
- Country Club Trail - Sanford
- Cross Seminole Trail - Seminole County
- E. E. Williamson Trail - Sanford
- Lake Minneola Scenic Trail and Clermont Trail - Clermont, Orlando - 3.1 miles (5.0 km), paved
- Little Econ Greenway - Orlando - 7.25 miles (11.67 km), paved
- Kewannee Trail - Casselberry
- Orlando Urban Trail - Downtown Orlando
- Rinehart Road to Riverwalk Connector - Sanford
- Riverwalk Trail - Sanford
- Seminole Wekiva Trail - Altamonte Springs
- South Lake Trail - Clermont
- West Orange Trail - Oakland, Winter Garden, Apopka - 22 miles (35 km), paved
- Wirz Park Trail- Casselberry

=== Pensacola area ===
- Pensacola Beach Trail - Pensacola Beach - 6 miles (9.7 km), paved (asphalt 8’ wide)
- Blackwater Heritage State Trail at 100 Florida Trails

=== Polk County ===
- Auburndale TECO Trail - Auburndale, Florida, also known as the Van Fleet Trail Extension runs for 6.5 miles (10.5 km) along Berkley Road from Lake Myrtle Sports Complex to the Polk City, Florida trailhead of the Van Fleet State Trail.
- Chain of Lakes Trail - Winter Haven, Florida
- Fort Fraser Trail - Runs for 7.75 miles (12.47 km) along Highway 98 from Bartow to the Polk State College (Lakeland) campus in Lakeland
- General James A. Van Fleet State Trail - Mabel, Polk City, Lakeland - 29.2 miles (47.0 km), paved
- Lake-to-Lake Trail - A 20 miles (32 km) path in Lakeland which connects Lakes Parker, Wire, Morton, Hunter, Hollingsworth, and John, as well as traversing Lakeland's downtown and historic districts.
- University Trail - Lakeland, Florida runs from Polk State College Lakeland campus to Florida Polytechnic University.

=== Tallahassee area ===
- Tallahassee-St. Marks Historic Railroad State Trail - 20.5 miles (32.9 km) paved
- Tallahassee-Georgia Florida and Alabama (GF&A) Trail - 2.4 miles (3.9 km) paved

=== Tampa Bay area ===
- Alderman's Ford Park Trail - Lithia is a 2.5 miles (4.0 km) trail accessed from either County Road 39 or Thompson Road.
- Bayshore Linear Park Trail - Tampa also known as "World's Longest Continuous Sidewalk". This 4.5 miles (7.2 km), paved (10' wide) trail, runs along Tampa Bay in an entirely urban setting.
- Bruce B. Downs Trail - Tampa - 7 miles, from University to Wesley Chapel
- Coastal Anclote Trail - Holiday - 4 mile trail, connecting to the Elfers Spur Trail and parks along the gulf
- Courtney Campbell Causeway - Tampa, Clearwater. This is a paved trail, minimum of ten feet wide, that parallels the south side of US State Road 60 across Tampa Bay. The Tampa trailhead is at Cypress Point Park, the west side connects to the Pinellas Trail in Clearwater.
- Elfers Spur Trail - Tarpon Springs - 2 miles connecting the Coastal Anclote Trail to the Pinellas Trail
- FishHawk Trails - Lithia - A network of paved trails connects to Lithia Springs State Park.
- Flatwoods Park Trail - Tampa - 8 miles
- Fort De Soto Park - St Petersburg
- Friendship Trail Bridge - Tampa, Pinellas County - Believed to be the world's longest over-water recreation trail at 2.6 miles (4.2 km), paved (concrete 30' wide) (Trail closed 11/6/08, due to bridge safety concerns)
- Good Neighbor Trail - Brooksville, Croom - 10 miles
- Green Spine Cycle Track - Tampa - 3.5 miles, protected on-road bike trail
- Hardy Trail - Dade City - 1 mile
- Howard Frankland Bridge Trail - Tampa - 7 Mile
- Mckay Bay Nature Trail - Tampa - 1.5 mile
- Meridian Avenue Greenway - Tampa - 1.5 miles
- Oldsmar Trail - Oldsmar - 11 miles
- Pinellas Trail - Clearwater, St. Petersburg, Dunedin - 34 miles (55 km)
- Starkey Trail - New Port Richey, 14 miles, stretching from the Pinellas Trail to the Suncoast Trail
- Suncoast Trail - Tampa, New Port Richey, Land O' Lakes, Brooksville - 41.3 miles
- Upper Tampa Bay Trail - Tampa - Over 12 miles (19 km) are currently completed

=== Other areas ===
- A1A Bicycle and Pedestrian Path - Flagler County - 19.5 miles (31.4 km), paved (concrete 10' wide)
- Bear Creek Nature Trail - Winter Springs
- Blackwater Heritage State Trail - Milton - 8.5 miles (13.7 km), paved
- Blountstown Greenway Bike Path - Blountstown area
- Boca Grande Bike Path - Boca Grande - 6.5 miles (10.5 km), paved
- Brevard/A1A Bike Path - Melbourne Beach
- Cape Haze Pioneer Trail -an 8-mile rail trail in Charlotte County, Florida running from Cape Haze in western Port Charlotte to just north of Placida along the right of way of the former Charlotte Harbor and Northern Railway.
- Cross Town Trail - Crystal River
- Four Freedoms Trail - Madison County
- Hollywood Trails - Hollywood
- John Yarbrough Linear Park - Fort Myers - 6 miles (9.7 km), paved
- Lake Okeechobee Scenic Trail (LOST trail), a 109-mile multi-use path around Lake Okeechobee
- Legacy Trail - Sarasota, Venice - 12.4 miles (20.0 km), paved
- Nature Coast State Trail - Cross City, Old Town, Fanning Springs, Chiefland, Trenton
- Palatka-Lake Butler State Trail
- Spring to Spring Trail - West Volusia County - 15 miles (24 km), paved
- Suwannee River Greenway at Branford - Branford, Lake City, Live Oak, High Springs - 12 miles (19 km), paved (10' wide)
- Venetian Waterway Park - Venice - 9.3 miles (15.0 km), paved
- Withlacoochee State Trail - Trilby, Croom, Floral City, Inverness, Citrus Springs, Gulf Junction - 46 miles (74 km), paved
- Withlacoochee Bay Trail - Yankeetown, Inglis - 5 miles (8.0 km), paved

== See also ==
- Florida
- List of cycleways
- List of Florida state parks
- List of Trails in Brevard County, Florida
- Rail trail
- Segregated cycle facilities
- Trail
- List of rail trails in Florida
