= Coast-to-Coast Trail =

Multi-use trail in Florida

- Length: 253 mi (407 km)
- Location: St. Petersburg, Florida to Titusville, Florida
- Use: Cycling
- Maintained by: Florida Department of Transportation
- Website: Official C2C Website

Trail Map
- Coast-to-Coast Trail

The Coast-to-Coast Trail (C2C) is a 253 mile continuous multi-use trail across the state of Florida that is currently under construction.

As of May 2025, the trail is 88% complete. The majority of the unfinished trail is along Florida State Road 50. The trail will provide a path connecting the Gulf of Mexico, particularly St. Petersburg, on peninsular Florida's west coast to the Atlantic Ocean, particularly Titusville, on Florida's east coast.

== Funding ==
The Coast-to-Coast trail is funded by the Florida Department of Transportation (FDOT), specifically the Shared-Use Non-motorized (SUN) Trail Program, which is funded by new vehicle tags.

Legislation funding the trail with $50 million was vetoed in 2013 by Governor Rick Scott in 2013. Legislation in support of the planned trail passed the Florida House of Representatives in April 2014 and would fund it with $15.5 million. Florida State Senator Andy Gardiner of Orlando is one of the plan's leading supporters. The funding would be used close gaps in the trail route. The estimated cost of the project is $45 million.

== Trails ==
There are 30 trails along the Coast-to-Coast trail, with 7 of them still in development. The trails from west to east are:

1. 1st Avenue South Bikeway
2. Fred Marquis Pinellas Trail
3. Tri-County Trail
4. Starkey Gap Trail
5. Starkey Boulevard Trail
6. Jay B. Starkey Wilderness Park
7. Suncoast Trail
8. Good Neighbor Trail Gap (project in development)
9. Good Neighbor Trail
10. Withlacoochee State Trail
11. South Sumter Connector (project in development)
12. South Sumter Trail (project in development)
13. General James A. Van Fleet State Trail
14. South Lake Connector (project in development)
15. Lake Minneola Scenic Trail
16. South Lake Trail
17. Hancock Trail
18. West Orange Trail
19. Clarcona Ocoee Trail
20. Orange County Gap (project in development)
21. Pine Hills Trail
22. Seminole Wekiva Trail
23. Cross Seminole Trail
24. Rinehart Trail
25. Spring-to-Spring Trail
26. East Central Regional Rail Trail Connector (project in development)
27. East Central Regional Rail Trail
28. Space Coast Loop Trail Downtown Connector
29. Space Coast Trail
30. Merritt Island National Wildlife Refuge to Playalinda (project in development)
