= Orange County Parks and Recreation =

Orange County Parks and Recreation is the county park department in Orange County, Florida, United States. It maintains and operates a number of parks, multiuse trails, and community recreation centers.

== List of parks ==
- Arcadia Acres Park
- Avalon/Mailer Trailhead
- Barber Park
- Barnett Park
- Bear Creek Recreation Complex
- Beeman Park
- Big Oak Park
- Bithlo Community Park
- Blanchard Park
- Bywater Boat Ramp
- Cady Way Trail
- Camp Joy
- Capehart Park
- Charles H. Bronson State Forest
- Cheney Heights Park
- Clarcona Horse Park
- Corporal Patrick Deans Park
- Crosby Island Marsh Preserve
- Crystal Lake Neighborhood Park
- Cypress Grove Park
- Deputy Brandon Coates Community Park (originally referred to as the John Young Community Park)
- Donnybrook Park
- Downey Park
- Dr. P. Phillips Community Park: located in the southern part of Dr. Phillips, next to Sand Lake Elementary School. Land bought in 2000, used in 2004 for yard waste dropoff after Hurricane Charley, and opened as a park in 2007.
- Eagles Roost
- East Orange Neighborhood Park
- East Orange Regional Park
- East Tangerine Park
- Econ Soccer Complex
- Fern Creek Boat Ramp
- Fort Christmas Historical Park
- Fort Gatlin Recreation Complex
- George Bailey Park
- Goldenrod Recreation Center/Goldenrod Park
- Gotha Park
- Hal Scott Preserve
- Honolulu Park
- Horizon West Park
- Hourglass Park
- Independence Park
- Interlaken Park
- Isle of Pine Preserve
- Ivey Lane Park
- Johns Lake Conservation Area
- Kaley Square Park
- Kelly Park/Rock Springs Run
- Lake Apopka Loop Trail
- Lake Down Boat Ramp
- Lake Lawne Park
- Lake Mann Fishing Pier
- Lake Pearl Park
- Lester Mandell Park
- Little Econ Greenway
- Long Branch
- Magnolia Park
- Marks Street Senior Recreation Complex
- Meadow Woods Recreation Center/Meadow Woods Park
- Millennium Park
- Moss Park
- Orlo Vista Park
- Padgett Park
- Park Manor Neighborhood Park
- Pine Hills Trail
- Pine Lily Preserve
- R.D. Keene Park
- Randolph Street Boat Ramp
- Riverside Acres
- Rolling Hills Park
- Roosevelt Martin Park
- Roosevelt Nichols Park
- Rose Place Park
- Sandhill Preserve
- Savage Christmas Creek Preserve
- Shadow Bay Park/Lake Cane Tennis Center
- Shingle Creek Trail
- Silver Star Recreation Center/Silver Star Community Park
- South Econ Community Park
  - South Econ Recreation Center
  - Renaissance Senior Center
- South Lake Mann Park
- South Orange Youth Sports Complex
- Split Oak Forest
- SR 50 Boat Ramp
- Summerport Neighborhood Park
- Taft Ball Field
- Taft Park
- Tangelo Community Park
- Tibet-Butler Preserve
- Tildenville Park
- Tom Staley Historical Park
- Trimble Park
- Turnbull Park
- Vogt-Meloon Park
- Warren Park
- Wedgefield Park
- West Beach Park
- West Orange Park
- West Orange Recreation Center
- West Orange Trail
  - Apopka Station
  - Apopka-Vineland Outpost
  - Chapin Station
  - Killarney Station
  - Winter Garden Station
- West Tangerine Park
- Wheatley Park
- Winter Park Estates Park
- Woodsmere Boat Ramp
- Young Pine Community Park
- Yucatan Park

== See also ==
- Orlando Department of Families, Parks and Recreation
