= Lake Down =

Lake in the state of Florida, US

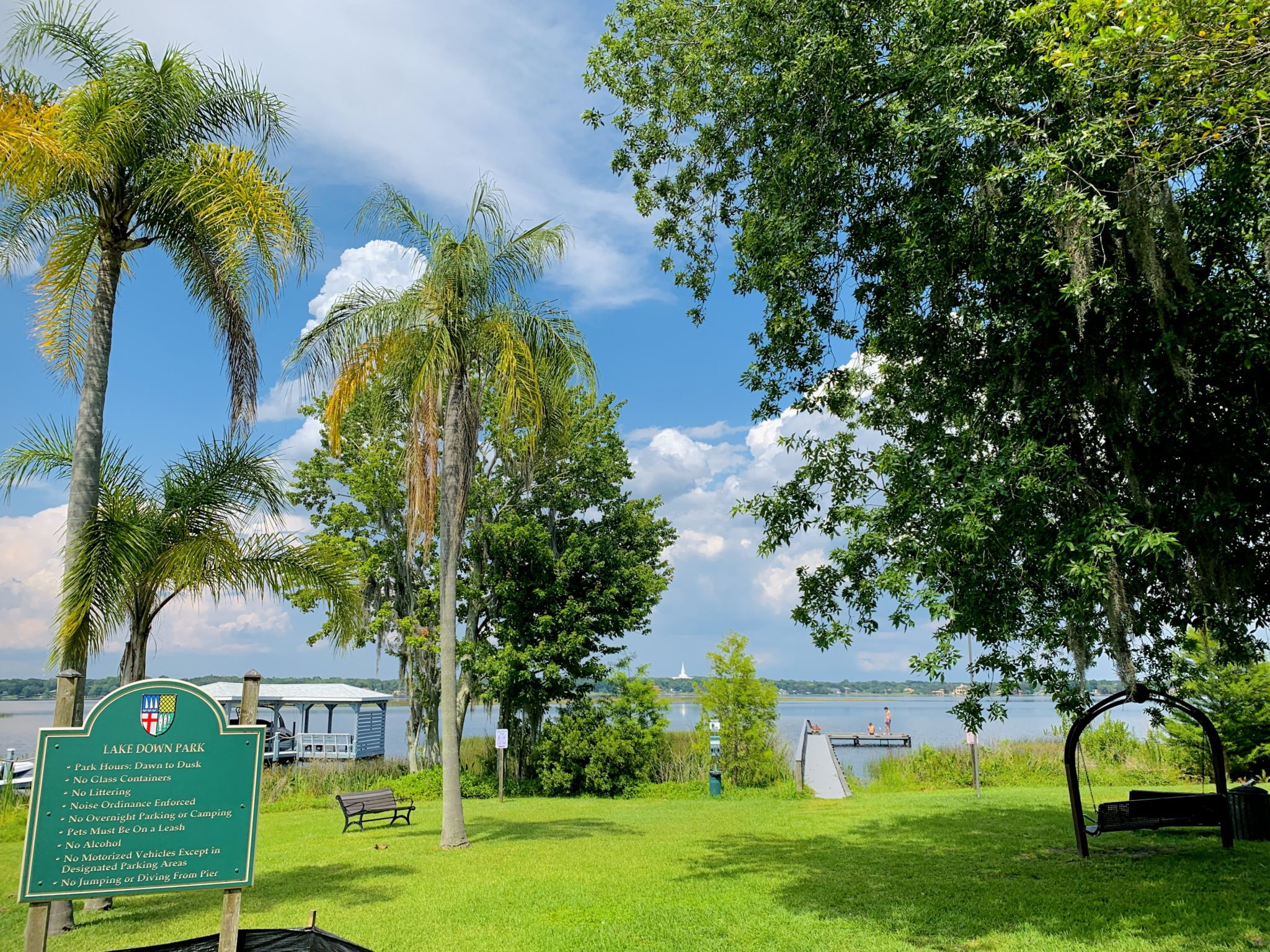
- Lake Down Park on Lake Down

- Location within Florida Location within the United States
- Location: Orange County, Florida, United States
- Coordinates: 28°29′48″N 81°32′2″W
- Type: Lake
- Basin countries: United States
- Surface area: 885 acres (358 ha)
- Settlements: Windermere and Isleworth

Lake Down is the headwater lake of the Butler Chain of Lakes system in Orange County, Florida, United States. The lake has an area of 885 acres (358 ha). The town of Windermere is situated along the western shore, while the community of Isleworth is located along the southern shore. Lake Down Park lies on the southwestern shore. Lake Down Boat Ramp is located on the southern shore.

== History ==
Real estate on the lake can include properties selling for millions of dollars.

In July 2016, a Piper PA-46 single-engine airplane crashed into Lake Down. Two boaters rushed toward the sinking plane and rescued a father, age 46, and his daughter, age 9, from the wreckage. The plane was salvaged from the lake the following week.

In June 2021, the Orange County Sheriff's Office recovered the body of a 17-year-old jet skier who drowned in Lake Down.

== See also ==
- Tibet-Butler Preserve
