= East Florida and Atlantic Railroad =

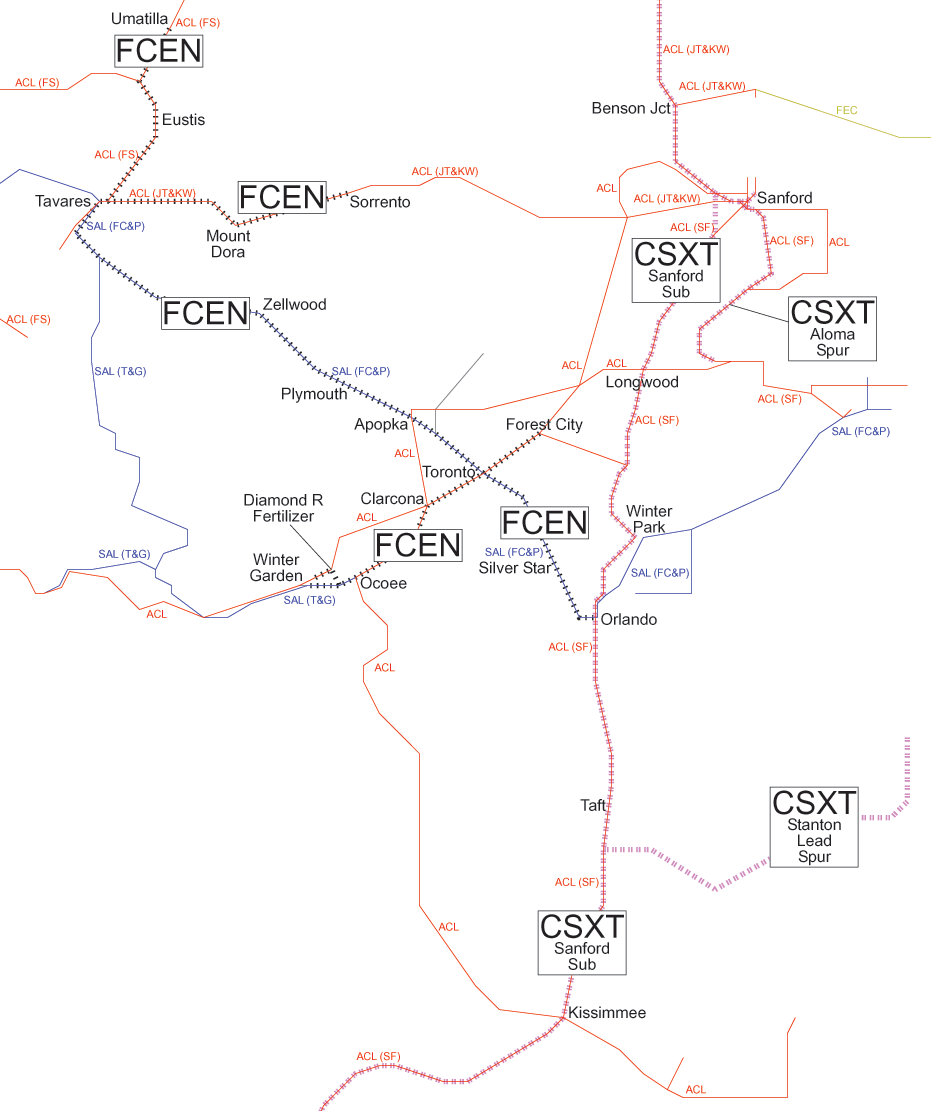
Current and former railroads in the Orlando area

The East Florida and Atlantic Railroad was a railroad line from Orlando, Florida, northeast and east to Lake Jesup via Winter Park and Oviedo. It eventually became part of the Seaboard Air Line Railway system (SAL), and was most recently part of CSX before being abandoned.

Until April 9, 1891, the line was owned by two separate companies, the Orlando and Winter Park Railway (west of Lakemont station, incorporated November 20, 1886, colloquially known as the Dinky Line) and the Osceola and Lake Jessup Railway (incorporated January 23, 1889). In 1894, the railroad was merged into the Florida Central and Peninsular Railroad. Florida Central and Peninsular railroad was acquired by the SAL in 1899 and FC&P's operation was taken over by SAL on July 1, 1900.

The part west of Winter Park was abandoned before the rest, which became part of CSX's former Aloma Branch, connected to the main line at Sanford, Florida. As of 2008, the last active vestige of this branch is currently identified by CSX as its Aloma Spur, which stretches for approximately seven miles from Sanford, skirting the southeastern fringes of that city before closely paralleling State Road 419 for roughly two miles, terminating half a mile from the SR-419/SR-434 fork in the city of Winter Springs. The remainder has all been abandoned. The northeastern portion of the Aloma Branch's former right of way has been converted for use as the Cross Seminole Trail, while the branch to the former Orlando Naval Training Center is now the Cady Way Trail. The last bit in Orlando was in use until recently as a short spur from CSX's main line, and will be used for the Dinky Line Trail.
