= Little Econ Greenway =

Coordinates: 28.57561°N 81.26111°W

The Little Econ Greenway is a multiuse trail in Orange County, Florida, United States, maintained by Orange County Parks and Recreation.

The Little Econ Greenway runs 7.5 miles from Forsyth Road to Alafaya Trail. From the east, the trail follows Lokanotosa Road before turning off behind University High School. The first road crossing from the east is Rouse Road which jogs to the north. The trail follows the Little Econlockhatchee River, past Blanchard Park, and under two underpasses (at Dean Road and at Econlockhatchee Trail). Two road crossing are at Harrell Road and Goldenrod Road as the trail continues to its western terminus at Forsyth Road. A few miles north of this trail, the Cady Way Trail also crosses Forsyth Road, a direct link is planned in the future. From the Cady Way Trail, the Orange County Trail System links to the Cross Seminole Trail.

== See also ==
- West Orange Trail, part of the same local trail system.
