= Killarney, Florida =

Unincorporated community in Florida, US

- Unincorporated community
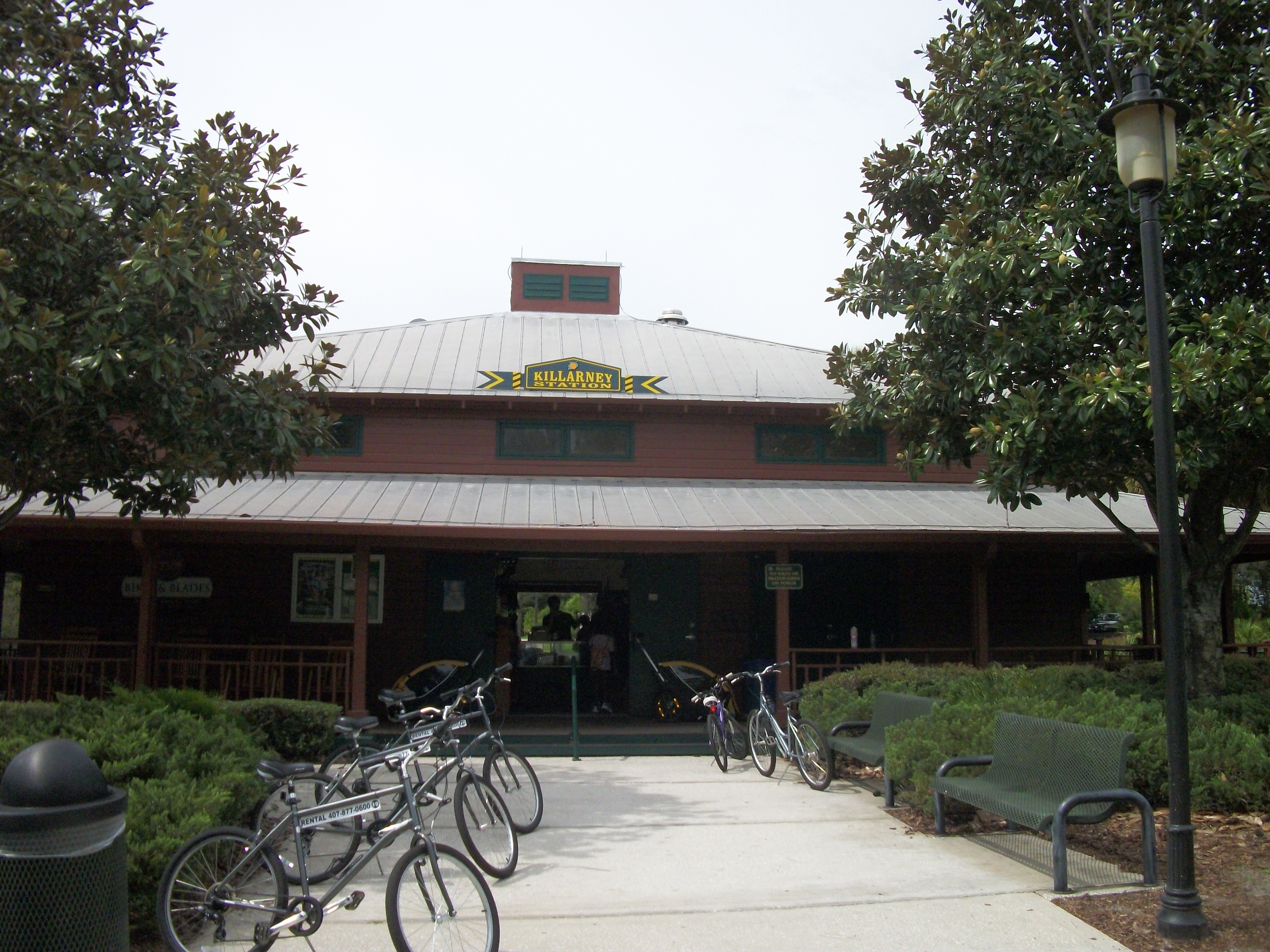
- Killarney Station, a bike shop used on the two rail-trails that terminate at Killarney

- Location within Florida
- Coordinates: 28°32′50″N 81°39′01″W
- Country: United States
- State: Florida
- County: Orange
- Elevation: 131 ft (40 m)
- Time zone: UTC-5 (Eastern (EST))
  - Summer (DST): UTC-4 (EDT)
- ZIP code: 34740
- Area codes: 407, 689 & 321
- GNIS feature ID: 295390

Killarney is an unincorporated community in Orange County, Florida, United States. Its ZIP code is 34740. The community is located west of Oakland, south of Lake Apopka, north of John's Lake, and east of the Lake-Orange County Line.

The main roads through Killarney are State Road 50, Old CR 50, and County Road 438. The West Orange Trail and South Lake-Lake Minneola Scenic Trail terminate within the community. Florida's Turnpike also runs through Killarney, but has no interchanges there. The nearest interchange is with SR 50 in nearby Oakland.

== History ==
A post office called Killarney was established in 1887, closed in 1902, reopened in 1926, and closed once more in 2003.

The community was named after Killarney, in Ireland.
