= Hal Scott Regional Preserve and Park =

Nature reserve in Florida, US

- Location within Florida
- Location: Orange County, Florida, United States
- Nearest city: Wedgefield, Florida
- Coordinates: 28°29′10″N 81°05′48″W
- Area: 9,515 acres (38.51 km^{2})
- Governing body: St. Johns River Water Management District

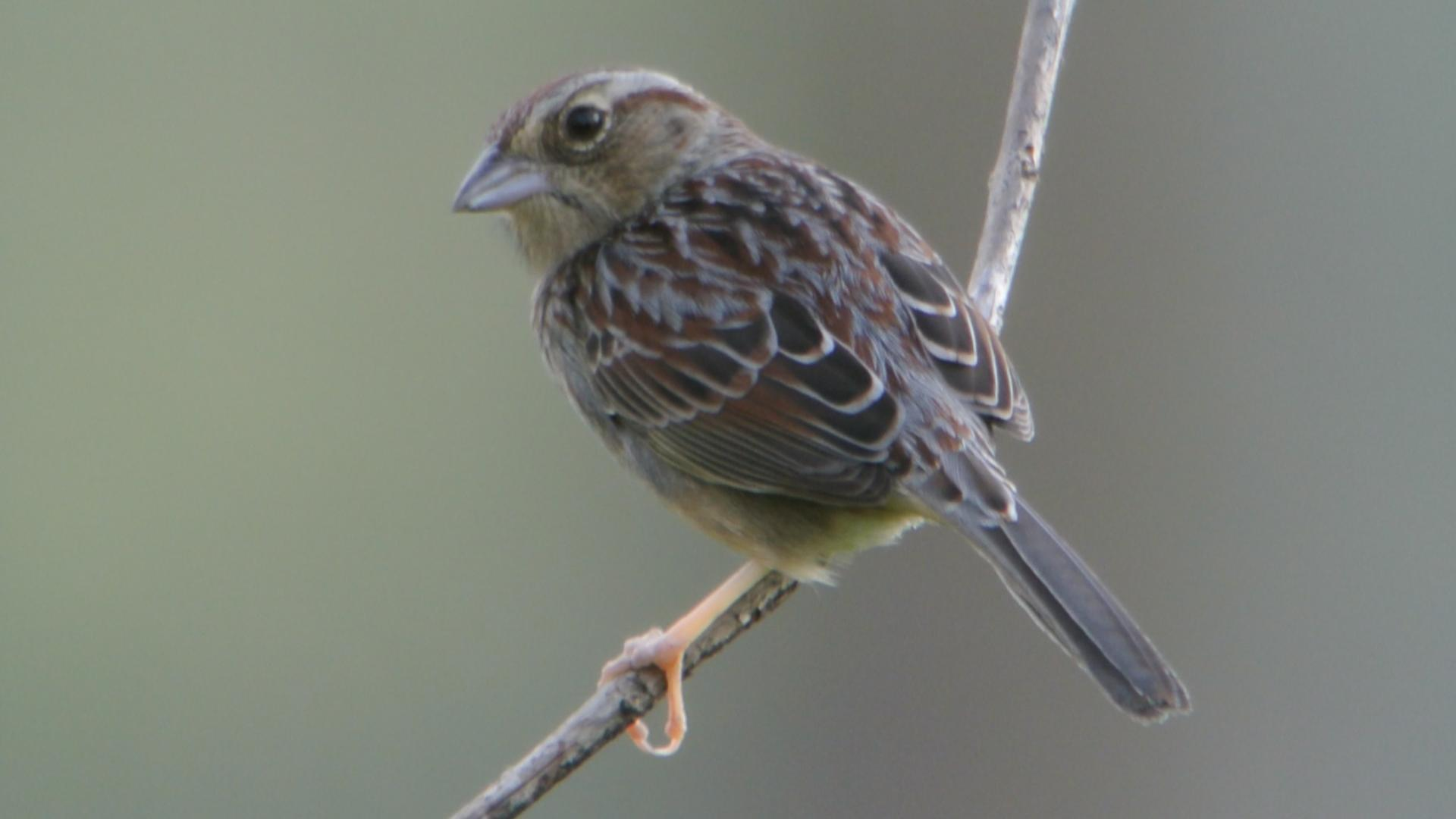
A Bachman's sparrow at the Hal Scott Regional Preserve and Park

Hal Scott Regional Preserve and Park is a 9,515-acre (38.51 km^{2}) nature preserve located along the banks of the Econlockhatchee River in east Orange County, Florida, United States. The Preserve is bordered by the Econlockhatchee on the West and Wedgefield, Florida on the East. It is managed by the St. Johns River Water Management District and Orange County Parks and Recreation. Recreational amenities include camping, hiking, horseback riding, mountain biking, fishing, and wildlife viewing.

== History ==
Timucua mounds have been found in the northern part of the preserve, and some campsites on the property date back several thousand years. For early settlers, such as Curry Ford, the Econlockhatchee River was a connecting link between Central Florida and the east coast of Florida. In the early 1900s, many of the trails were blazed for railroad beds to transport timber and turpentine.

== Flora and fauna ==
The area consists of flatwoods and open prairie, with hammocks of cypress, maple, pine, oak, and sweetgum trees, interlaced with creeks and rivers. Wildlife include deer, turkey, bald eagles, sandhill cranes, gopher tortoises, bobcats, river otters, indigo snakes and downy woodpeckers. The preserve is home to a few breeding pairs of the threatened red-cockaded woodpecker.

== Access and hours of operation ==
Hal Scott Regional Preserve and Park is located at 3871 Dallas Boulevard, Orlando, FL 32833. It is open 7 days/week, from sunrise to sunset. Because the area is in the floodplain of the Econlockhatchee River, it can become impassable during the summer rainy season.
