= Pine Hills Trail =

Trail in Florida, USA

Pine Hills Trail is a planned multi-use trail in the area of Pine Hills, Florida, built by Orange County Parks and Recreation. It utilizes a power easement between the Shingle Creek Trail, with a route planned to Kissimmee, and West Orange Trail. A groundbreaking for the trail was held in 2006, but it was held up by budget cuts. After many years of inaction, the trail was finally opened in 2017.
