= Downey Park =

Park in Union Park, Florida

Coordinates: 28.567°N 81.243°W

Downey Park is a 47-acre (190,000 m^{2}) park in Union Park, Florida. The park is operated by Orange County Parks and Recreation, and offers a variety of programs and recreational opportunities for local residents. Its facilities include a baseball complex (home of the Union Park Little League) with four baseball fields and one softball field, a fishing dock, two rentable pavilions, a water playground (The Splash Pad), a seasonally lifeguarded lakefront with a swimming area, a skate park, a basketball court, picnic areas, and two playgrounds. The park is operated 363 days a year; it is closed on Christmas Eve and Christmas Day.

In 2023, Orange County announced plans to build 10 pickleball courts at Downey Park.

== Programs and events ==
Downey Park is host to numerous programs that run throughout the year. Registration is available through the park office.

=== Camp Scooter ===
Camp Scooter (named after Orange County Parks and Recreation's mascot, Scooter the Turtle) is a day camp program for children aged five to twelve years old. The program begins one week after Orange County Schools break for the summer and runs for the remainder of the summer. For a low weekly fee, children participate in one field trip a week, and are provided with lunch.

=== Junior Magic ===
Junior Magic is a basketball program run by the park. Volunteer coaches help teams of children participate in a tournament run by the park.

=== Teen Hype Night ===
Held the second Saturday of each month, Teen Hype Night has won awards for its innovative approach to providing youth with safe opportunities for recreation. The event includes live performances by local garage bands, and often includes activities such as rock climbing, moon walks, skating competitions, and themed games.

=== Santa's Wacky Wonderland ===
The park's flagship event, Santa's Wacky Wonderland, is held in December of each year. The event provides activities for elementary school aged children and includes a variety of inflatable games and crafts. The highlight of the event is the opportunity for the children to meet Santa, who arrives at the park by boat.
