= Isleworth, Florida =

Community in Florida, U.S.

Coordinates: 28.477934°N 81.527181°W

Isleworth is a community outside Windermere, Florida, in Orange County.

Located outside the Orlando city limits, the community is desirable for its proximity to the city's downtown, its location within the Butler chain of lakes, and as a local status symbol of wealth and grandeur.

Isleworth traces its roots to the Chase family, a group of citrus grove owners from Philadelphia who purchased land in the area after the U.S. Civil War. Sidney and Joshua Chase referred to their property as the "Isle of Worth," because its citrus trees seemed naturally resistant to periodic cold snaps. In 1984, Chase descendants sold their lands to Arnold Palmer, who with developers designed an extra large golf course for wealthy members. In 1993, the Tavistock Group purchased the golf course and surrounding area and began developing the large, expensive and magnificent mansions that are a hallmark of the community.

Isleworth is home to a championship 18-hole golf course originally designed by Arnold Palmer and Ed Seay, later re-designed and modified by Steve Smyers. The course consistently ranks as the longest and toughest course in the state by the Florida State Golf Association (FSGA). It complements another Tavistock development on the other side of Orlando, Lake Nona.

Late in 2007, the community became a bone of contention between Orange County officials and nearby Windermere when the city announced plans to annex Isleworth. With property tax rolls totaling $800 million that year, it generated $3.5 million in tax revenues for the county that the city was anxious to redirect to its own coffers. Orange County Mayor Rich Crotty quickly threatened to end county fire and sheriff services to Isleworth if annexation plans went forward.

Beginning in December 2014, Isleworth will become the new location of the Hero World Challenge.

== Notable people ==
- Bubba Watson - Professional golfer
