= Sanford and Indian River Railroad =

Historic railroad in Central Florida

Overview
- Reporting mark: SIRR
- Locale: Central Florida
- Dates of operation: 1883–1893
- Successor: Plant System

Technical
- Track gauge: 4 ft 8 1/2 in (1,435 mm) standard gauge
- Previous gauge: originally 3 ft (914 mm) gauge

The Sanford and Indian River Railroad was a historic railroad in Central Florida running from Sanford southeast to Oviedo and Lake Charm, a distance of 20 miles. The railroad dates back to the late 1800s and parts of it are still active today.

== Route description ==
The Sanford and Indian River Railroad began at a junction with the South Florida Railroad in Sanford. The junction with the South Florida Railroad main line in Sanford was located on 9th Street just west of Holly Avenue. From Sanford, the railroad ran south and southwest to the western end of Lake Jesup. At Lake Jesup, it turned east through present-day Winter Springs and Oviedo before coming to an end at Lake Charm.

== History ==
The Sanford and Indian River Railroad was chartered in 1881 by officers of the South Florida Railroad. The South Florida Railroad was in the process of building their main line from Sanford southwest to Orlando and Tampa at the time. South Florida Railroad president James Ingraham envisioned a rail line running from Sanford east through agricultural lands to the Indian River Lagoon near Titusville, hence the railroads name.

The first six miles of the Sanford and Indian River Railroad from Sanford to Lake Jesup was complete on December 27, 1883. That year, it was leased by the South Florida Railroad and it would eventually be integrated with South Florida Railroad network. The railroad was extended as far as Lake Charm by 1886 but was never fully extended to its intended terminus at Titusville. The line was also converted to standard gauge in 1886. The line was primarily used to ship celery, citrus, and other produce.

The South Florida Railroad, along with other railroads in the Sanford area, were incorporated into Henry B. Plant's system of railroads in 1893. In 1902, the Plant System was taken over by the Atlantic Coast Line Railroad. The Sanford and Indian River Railroad line continued operation as the Atlantic Coast Line's Lake Charm Branch (U Branch).

In 1953, the Atlantic Coast Line relocated their Sanford passenger station from just north of the Lake Charm Branch junction (the current site of Coastline Park) to their main line's bypass of central Sanford. As a result, main line track southwest of the junction to the bypass (which was the original South Florida Railroad alignment through Sanford) was removed. Track from the junction northwest to the bypass at a point near Rands Yard (which was the original Jacksonville, Tampa and Key West Railway alignment) then became part of the Lake Charm Branch.

In 1967, the Atlantic Coast Line merged with their long-time rival, the Seaboard Air Line Railroad (SAL). The Lake Charm Branch connected with the Seaboard Air Line's Orlando Subdivision (which ran to Lake Charm from Orlando and Winter Park) at Oviedo. After the merger was complete, the company was named the Seaboard Coast Line Railroad and the Sanford and Indian River Railroad line was designated as their Aloma Subdivision (which also included the remaining SAL line from Oviedo southwest to Aloma). The Seaboard Coast Line became CSX Transportation by 1986.

In the 1990s, CSX abandoned the line from Lake Charm to a point near Winter Springs along with the remaining SAL track to Aloma. Despite no longer running to Aloma, the remaining line from Sanford to Winter Springs is still known as CSX's Aloma Spur and it connects to the A Line (now the Central Florida Rail Corridor) at the Sanford AutoTrain station. The Cross Seminole Trail was built on the abandoned right of way between Winter Springs and Oviedo in 2002.

=== Potential SunRail expansion ===
In 2013, local officials proposed to use the line to expand the SunRail commuter rail system to Orlando Sanford International Airport. The Florida Department of Transportation has a contractual option to lease the spur from CSX for 30 years after 2007 for $10 as part of the deal when they purchased the A Line (where SunRail currently operates). This remains a proposal and no further action has been taken.

== Historic stations ==
Milepost	City/Location	Station	Connections and notes
AU 766.0	Sanford	Sanford	junction with South Florida Railroad Main Line (ACL)
AU 768.0	Sanford	Speer Grove	
AU 769.2	Sanford	Fort Reed	
AU 769.7		Onoro	
AU 770.0		Silver Lake	
AU 771.2		Rutledge	
AU 771.6		Lake Jesup	
AU 778.0	Winter Springs	Clifton	junction with Florida Midland Railway (ACL)
	Winter Springs	Tuscawilla	
AU 785.5	Oviedo	Oviedo	junction with Florida Central and Peninsular Railroad Orlando Division (SAL)
AU 786.9	Oviedo	Lake Charm	
