= Tibet-Butler Preserve =

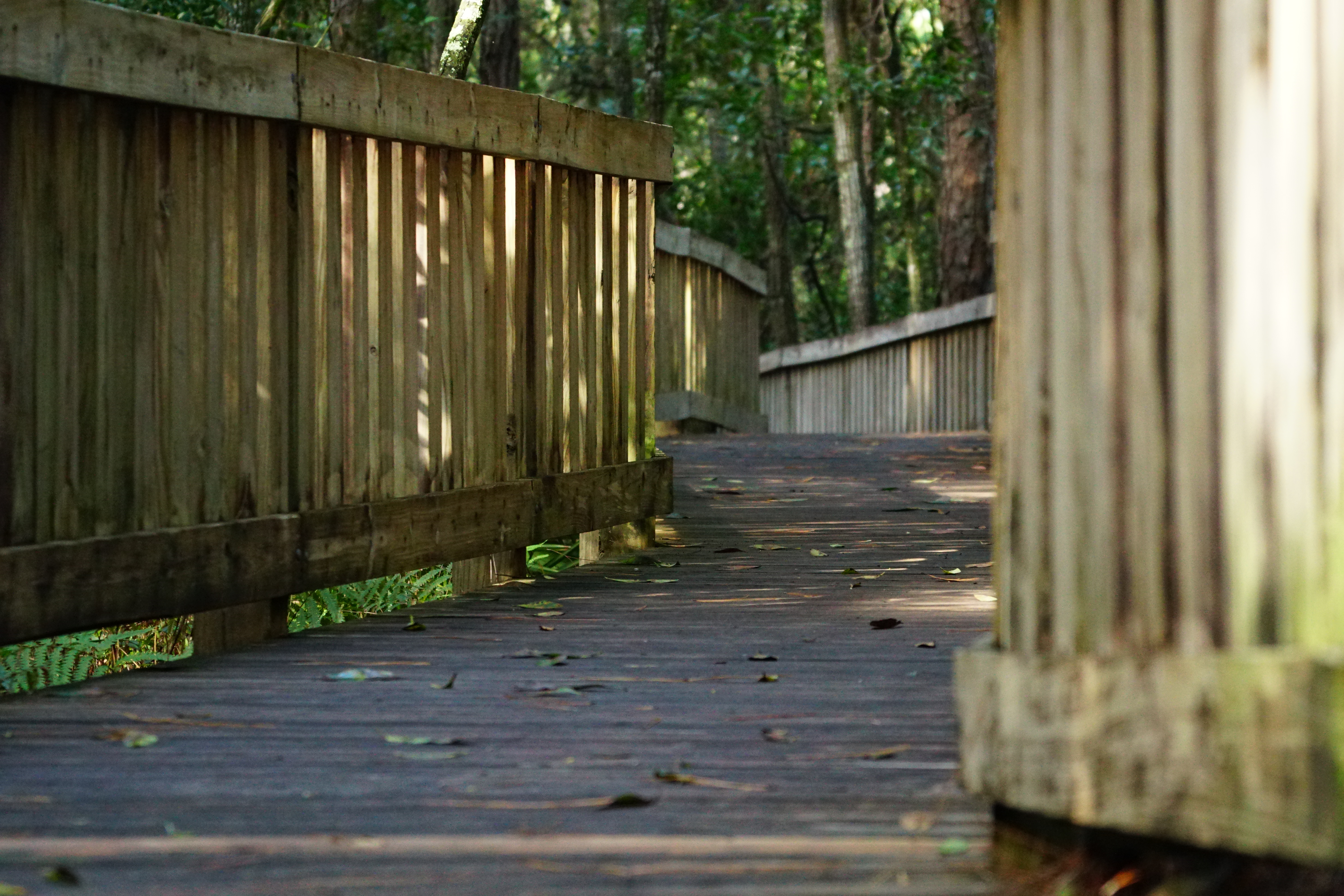
- The boardwalk at Tibet-Butler Preserve

- Location within Florida
- Type: Regional park
- Location: Orange County, Florida, United States
- Nearest city: Orlando, Florida
- Coordinates: 28°26′33″N 81°32′30″W
- Area: 440 acres (1.8 km^{2})
- Operator: Orange County Parks and Recreation
- Open: All year, 8:00am - 6:00pm
- Website: orangecountyfl.net

The Tibet-Butler Preserve is a county park located on the shore of Lake Butler, southwest of Orlando, Florida. It is managed by the Orange County Parks and Recreation.

== History ==
The land for Tibet-Butler Preserve was acquired in 1986 and 1987 using funds from the Land Acquisition Trust Fund and the Water Management Lands Trust Fund.

== Recreation ==
Tibet-Butler Preserve contains a nature center, 3.6 miles (5.8 km) of trails, a picnic area, a butterfly garden, and a wheelchair-accessible sandbox. The nature center is called the Vera Carter Environmental Center, named after the Orange County Commissioner from 1980 to 1992. It is home to a number of exhibits including live animals, taxidermy, and interactive displays.

== Wildlife ==
The area consists of a variety of habitats, including bay swamps, marshes, cypress swamps, pine flatwoods, and scrub. Wildlife includes gopher tortoises, North American river otters, nine-banded armadillos, american alligators, green and brown anoles, six-lined racerunners, and over 100 species of birds including bald eagles, osprey, and eastern screech owls. Tibet-Butler Preserve is a site on the Great Florida Birding and Wildlife Trail.

== Access and hours of operation ==
Tibet-Butler Preserve is located at 8777 Winter Garden Vineland Rd, Orlando, FL 32836. It is open daily, from 8:00am - 6:00pm. Trails are occasionally closed due to flooding.
