= Seminole Wekiva Trail =

Rail trail in Florida, United States

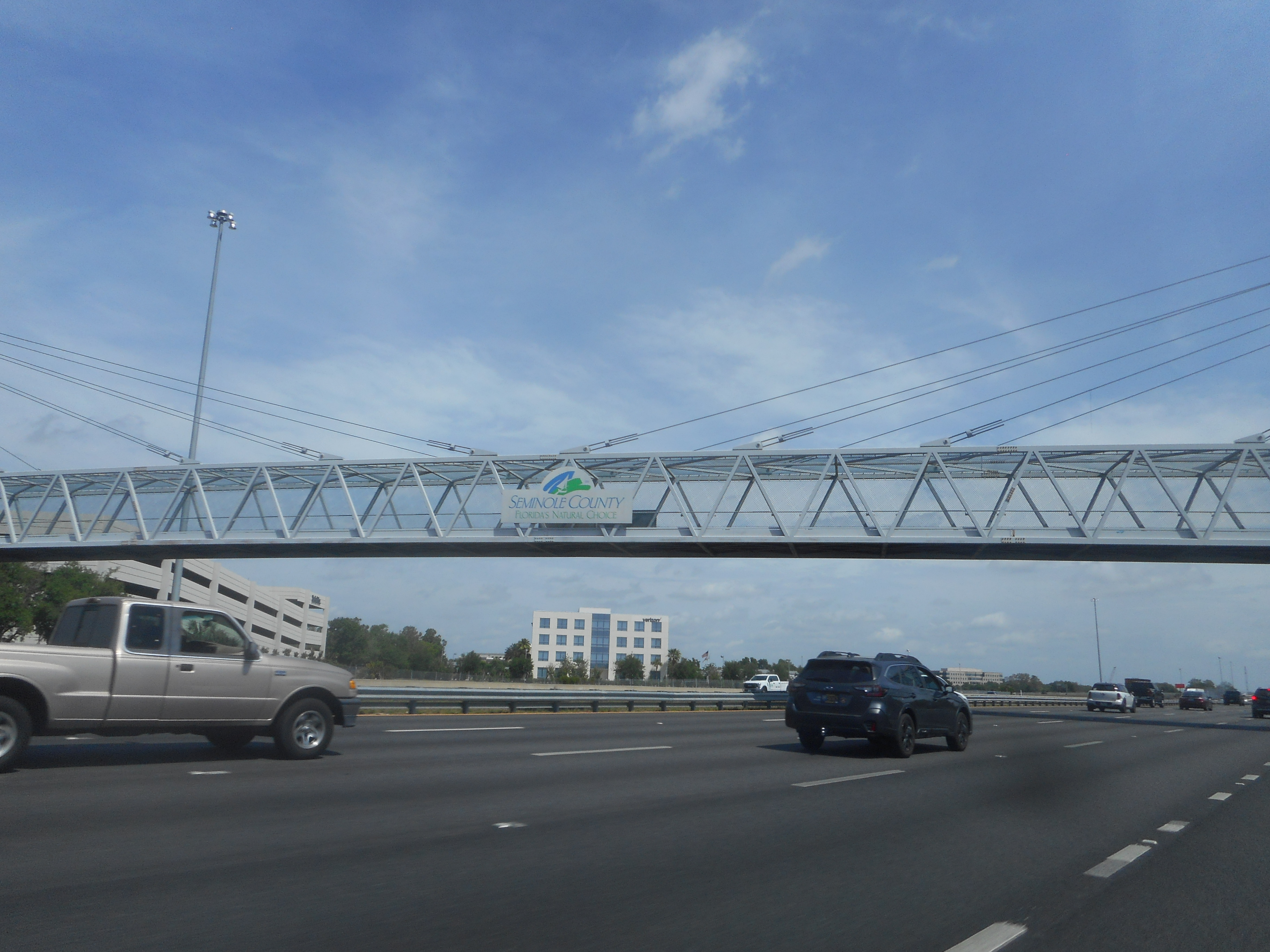
- The overpass over I-4 That connects the Cross Seminole Trail to the Seminole-Wekiva Trail
- Length: 14 miles (23 km)
- Trailheads: Jones; 28.7415°N 81.3799°W; Markham; 28.7922°N 81.3980°W; San Sebastian; 28.6646°N 81.4129°W; Sanlando Park; 28.6761°N 81.3972°W; Seminole Softball Complex; 28.6828°N 81.3971°W
- Surface: Paved

The Seminole Wekiva Trail is a paved multi-use trail in Seminole County, Florida. It stretches almost 14 miles. A section of it is part of the Florida National Scenic Trail. It is built on the former Orange Belt Railway. It connects with the Cross Seminole Trail. It offers opportunity for hikers, cyclists, dog walkers, runners, hikers and inline skaters. Extensions to the trail are proposed.

Trailheads access:

- San Sebastian Trailhead
- Seminole County Softball Complex
- Jones Trailhead - Markham Woods Road (at Long Pond) Longwood, FL 32779
- Markham Trailhead

== See also ==
- Florida Coast-to-Coast Trail
