= Blackwater Heritage State Trail =

Rail trail in Florida, United States

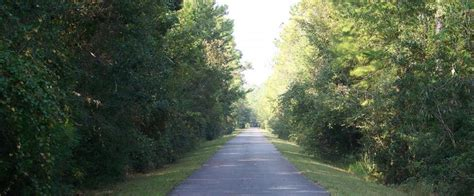
- A view down the trail
- Length: 8.1 mi (13.0 km)
- Location: Milton, Florida, United States
- Established: 1999
- Season: Year round
- Hazards: Weather
- Surface: Asphalt

Trail map
- Route of the Blackwater Heritage State Trail

Blackwater Heritage State Trail is an 8.1-mile (13.0 km) rail trail in Santa Rosa County, Florida. It is part of Florida's State Greenways and Trails System.

== History ==
In February 1990, the city of Milton's citizens held the largest public gathering ever in Santa Rosa County's history, consisting of over 500 people. On this day, at the county auditorium, the citizens enthusiastically listened to a presentation. Afterwards, efforts were taken to convert this property into a prestigious'multi-use trail, which city and county officials and state and federal agencies coordinated.

Also, the US. Department of Interior effectuated a transfer of title regarding the land to the State of Florida on November 4, 1993.

Meanwhile, the property was initiated for the general public's parks and recreational use. On February 20, 1999, a groundbreaking and dedication were held for the Blackwater Heritage State Trail. Presently, the trail reaches a little more than 8 miles in length. Then, 'North from the Blackwater Heritage Trail is the 1.5-mile Military Heritage Trail managed by Whiting Field Air Station.'

== See also ==
- List of Florida state parks
