= Upper Tampa Bay Trail =

Multi-use recreational trail in Tampa, Florida

Coordinates: 28.0463108°N 82.575093°W

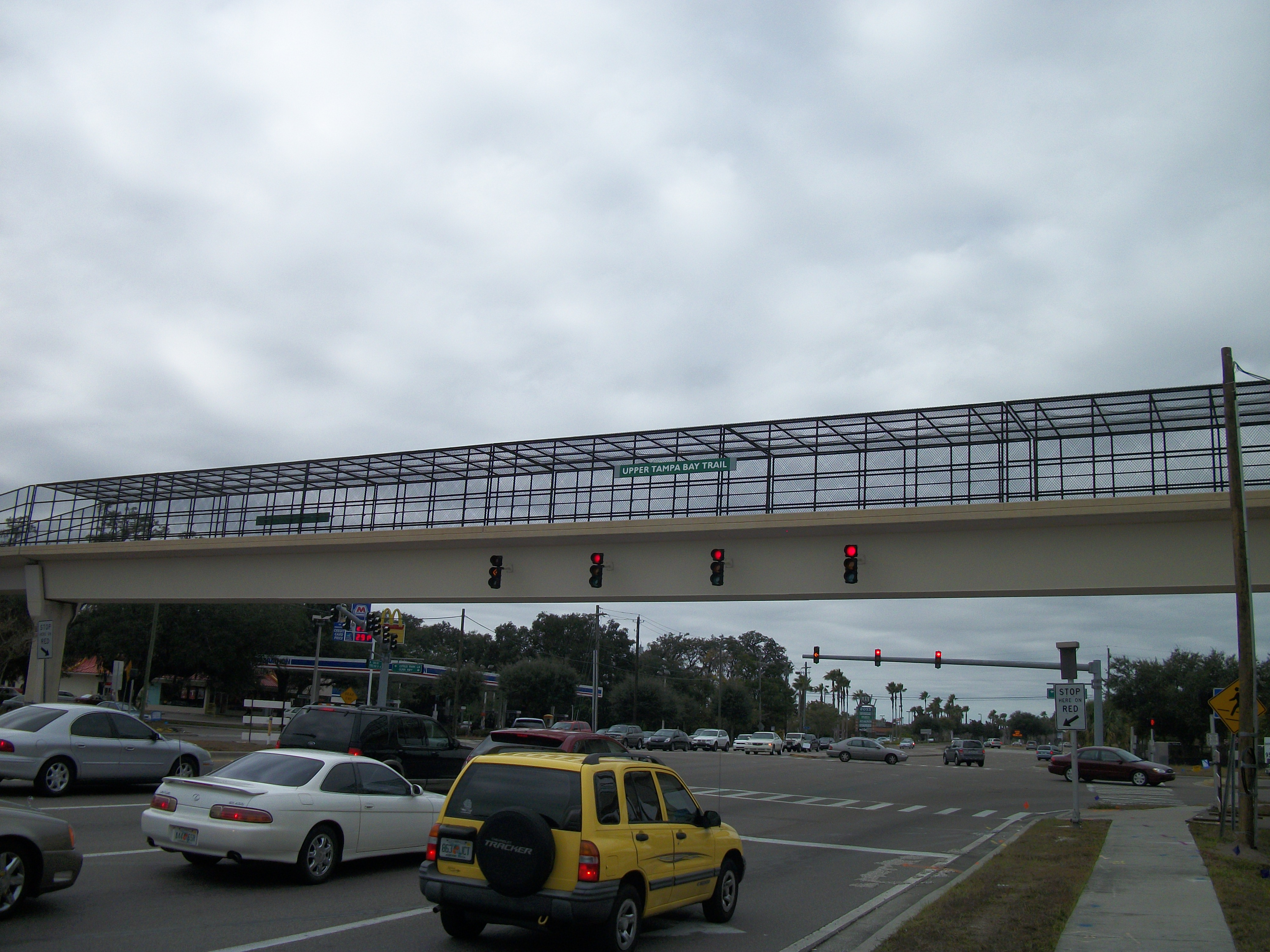
Upper Tampa Bay Trail bridge over Gunn Highway in Citrus Park, Florida.

The Upper Tampa Bay Trail is a 7.25-mile-long (11.67 km) paved multi-use, non-motorized, rail trail located in northwest Hillsborough County, Florida.

The trail currently starts from just off Memorial Highway and heads north along the Channel A canal. It crosses underneath both a Linebaugh Avenue bridge and CSX Clearwater Subdivision railroad tracks then wraps around the old Northwest Transfer Station landfill. It then follows an abandoned railroad corridor north along the Veterans Expressway.

The Upper Tampa Bay Trail also has a 4.3-mile (6.9 km) section that runs from Van Dyke Road to Lutz Lake Fern Road connecting it to the Suncoast Trail.

== Trailheads ==
- Peterson Road Park
- Ehrlich Road
- Wilsky
- Channel Park
- Old Memorial
- Lutz Lake Fern Road
