= Florida Keys Overseas Heritage Trail =

Long-distance hiking trail in the United States

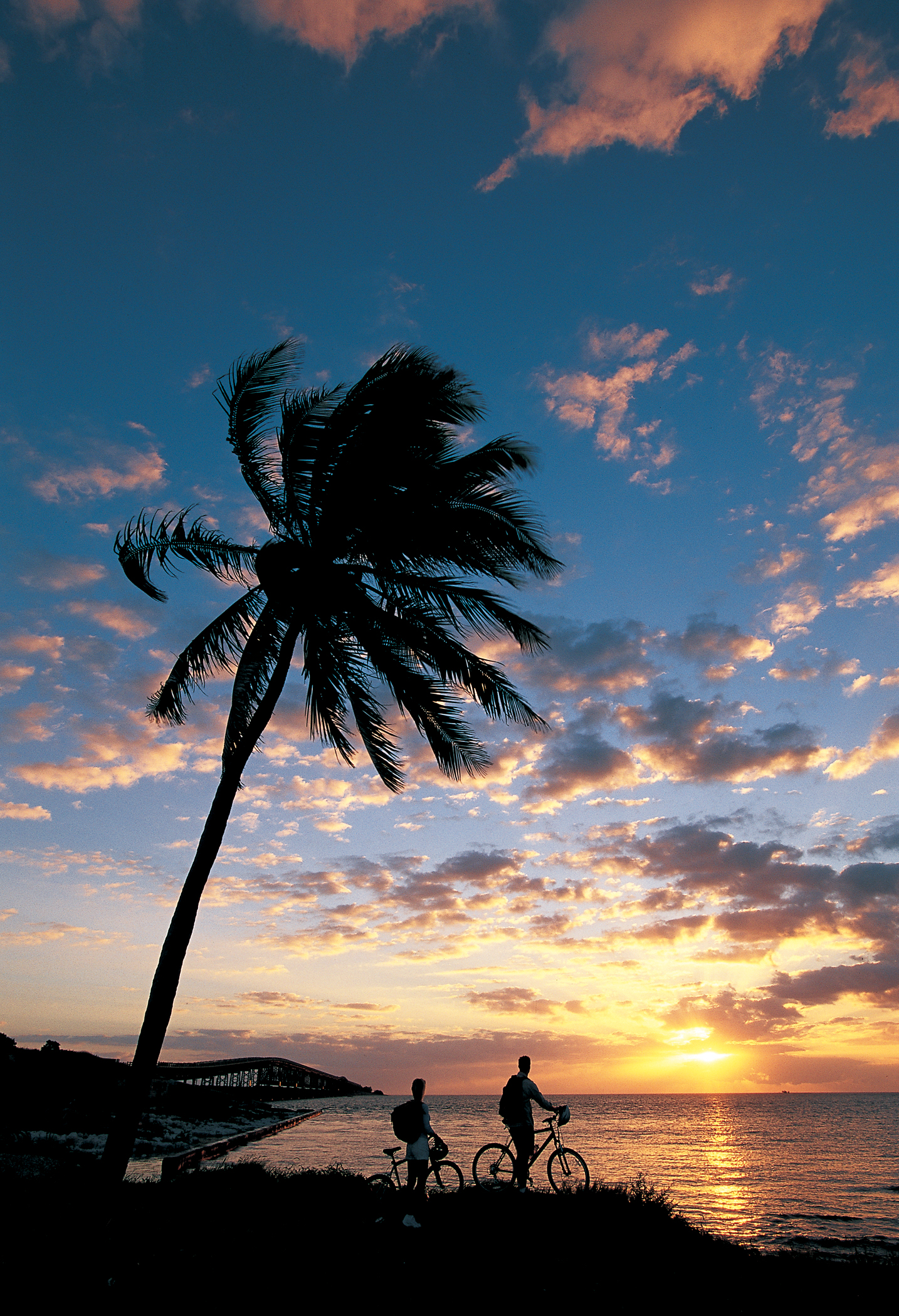
- Length: 106 mi (171 km)
- Location: Florida Keys

The Florida Keys Overseas Heritage Trail is a 106-mile (171 km) paved rail trail—a multi-use bicycle and pedestrian facility—being constructed between Key Largo and Key West in the Florida Keys. As of January 2022, 90 mi (140 km) of the trail has been constructed.

== History and route ==
Using dedicated right of way separate from (but parallel to) U.S. Highway 1, the trail follows the former railbed of the Overseas Railroad, an extension of the Florida East Coast Railway that operated from 1911 until the 1935 Labor Day hurricane ended service. It comprises the southernmost portion of the East Coast Greenway, a 3,000-mile (4,800 km) route of bicycle and pedestrian trails between Maine and Florida.

Plans for the trail include educational kiosks, roadside picnic areas, scenic overlooks, fishing piers, water access points, and bicycle and jogging paths. Historic railroad bridges along the trail—23 of which are still mostly intact—will be preserved. The bridge decks may be reduced in width from 22 feet (6.7 m) to 12 ft (3.7 m)—their original width, prior to being widened in the 1940s for two-way motor vehicle traffic after the railroad's demise—or their full 22 ft (6.7 m) width may be retained, particularly in multi-use areas. Original bridgework will be repaired or rebuilt, and spans removed during the 1980s and 1990s fishing pier conversion will be restored. Where the original bridges no longer exist, the trail will be temporarily cantilevered on the side of the newer US 1 bridges until new 12 ft-wide (3.7 m) bridge sections can be constructed. The design of the new bridges will match the historical character of the original bridges.

The Florida Keys Overseas Heritage Trail was designated a National Recreation Trail in 2004.
