= Georgia Florida and Alabama Trail =

Rail trail in the United States

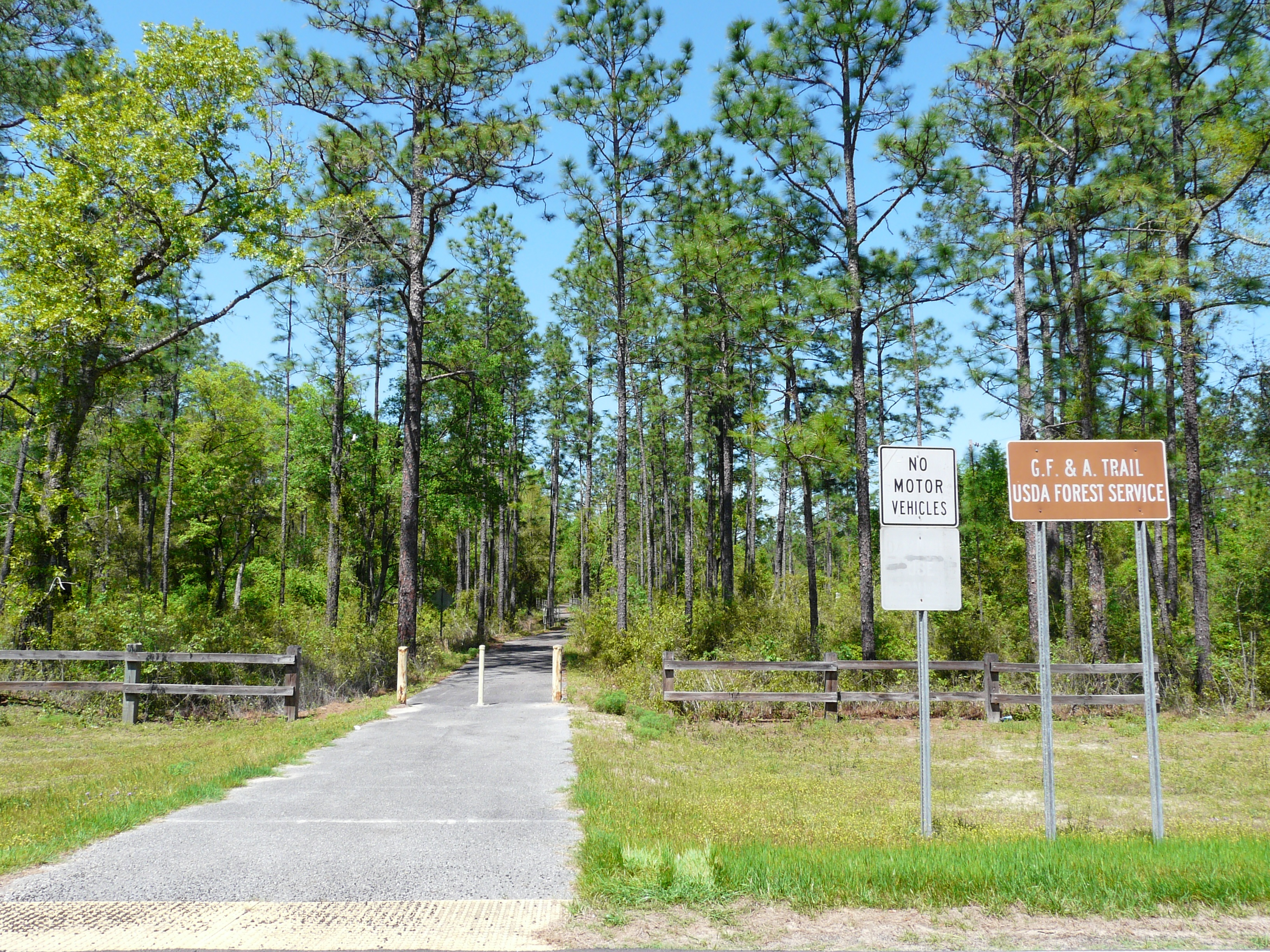
Southern terminus of the trail

The Georgia Florida and Alabama (Railroad) Trail (GF&A) is section of the proposed 52-mile rail-trail from Tallahassee to Carrabelle on the Gulf of Mexico. It is part of the Georgia, Florida, and Alabama railway's holdings and covered fifty miles of track from Carrabelle on the Gulf of Mexico to Tallahassee, Florida. The United States Forestry Service placed the start of this trail at Trout Pond Park located just south of Tallahassee Airport on SR 373. The forest service has incorporated about 1.3 miles of the park land and just over a mile of the old GF&A rail-bed in the GF&A Trail in the Apalachicola National Forest. This 2.4-mile section is complete and paved, accommodating cyclists, walkers and inline skaters. It also features nearby hiking trails in the Apalachicola National Forest. Excursions just off the trail to old foundations, streams and ponds. It is sometimes referred to as the Gopher, Frog & Alligator Trail. The first mile of the trail is completely wooded with just over a mile of the rest following SR 373 on the old GF&A railroad bed. Though following the road adequate wooded land barriers the trail. Currently the trail is only on National Forest land which allows hiking and primitive camping during non-hunting season.

The Trout Pond Recreation Area is at the northern end and has restrooms, water fountains and parking. Trout Pond Park also has a stocked fishing lake and picnic facilities. All along the trail, watch for wildlife and be sure to check with the Apalachicola National Forest about hunting season dates.

The trail is open during daylight hours only; pets are allowed but must be on a 6-foot leash at all times. Currently the trail is only on Apalachicola National Forest land which allows hiking and primitive dispersed camping during non-hunting season.
