= Cross Seminole Trail =

Trail in Seminole County, Florida

Coordinates: 28.70508°N 81.29456°W

- Length: 23 miles (37 km)
- Location: Seminole County, Florida
- Established: 2002
- Use: Hiking, Bicycling, Equestrian
- Website: https://www.seminolecountyfl.gov/departments-services/leisure-services/greenways-natural-lands/trails/cross-seminole-trail.stml

The Cross Seminole Trail is a pedestrian, bicycle, and equestrian trail in Seminole County, Florida just north of Orlando. The first segment opened in 2002. The current route begins at the intersection of Aloma and Howell Branch where it meets the Cady Way Trail in Winter Park through Oviedo and Winter Springs and stretches into Lake Mary. The trail is 23 miles (37 km) long, or 34 miles (55 km) including the Orange County trail extension. The trail connects to Seminole Wekiva Trail in Lake Mary. It ends near Lake Monroe with it intersecting the Sanford Riverwalk.

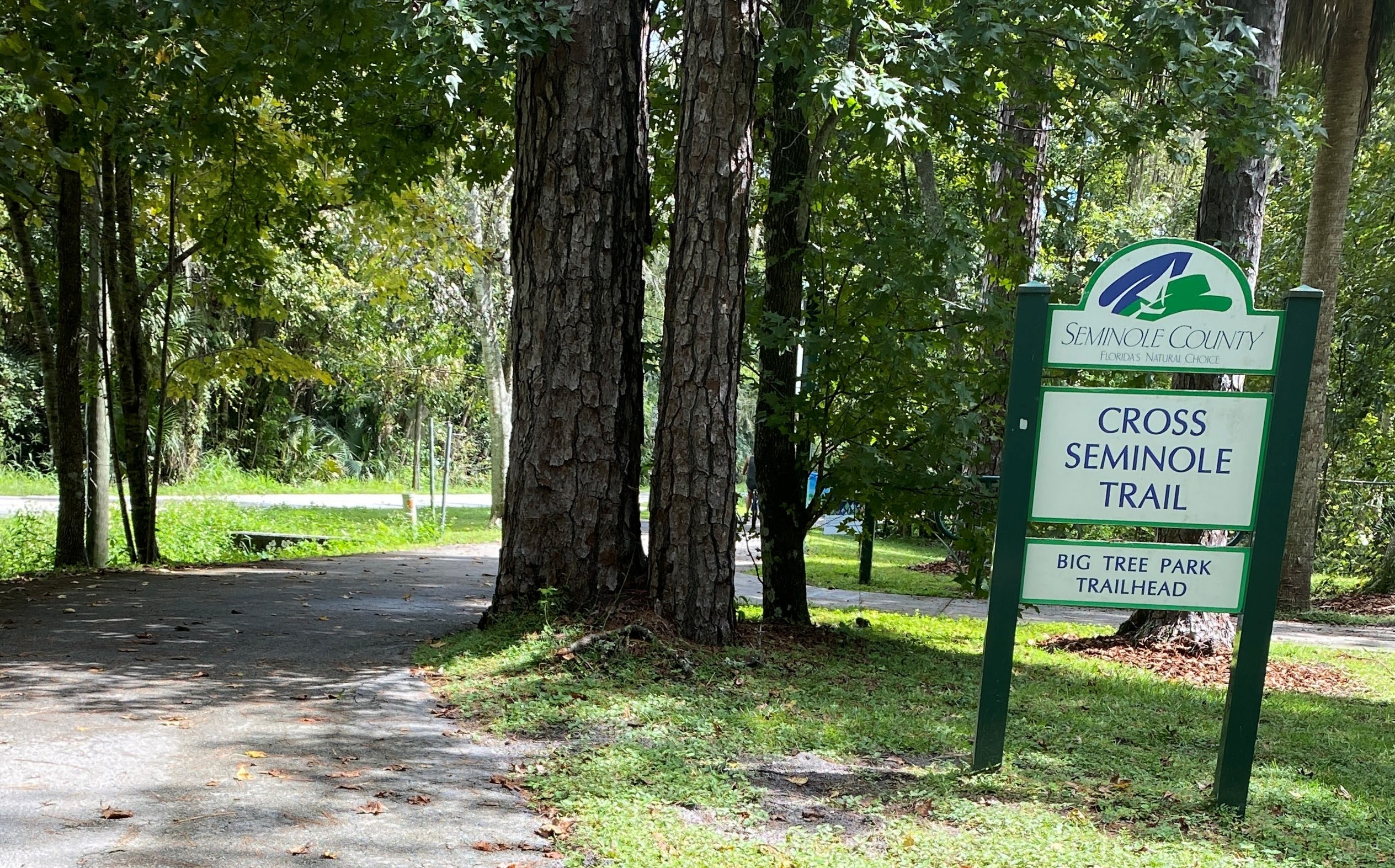
Cross Seminole Trail - Big Tree Park trailhead

== History ==
The Cross Seminole Trail runs along the former right of way of the Sanford and Indian River Railroad from Winter Springs to Oviedo.

The Cross Seminole Trail was opened in 2002 to provide Central Florida with easy access to a greenway, or outdoor recreation. The trail was designed to accommodate hikers, bicyclists, and horses. The original span of the trail stretched from downtown Oviedo to just east of Winter Springs. In 2007, a new overpass was built that let users cross State Road 434 in Winter Springs. This allowed expansion to the north and east. The newest constructed portion now borders State Road 434 and heads in the direction of Sanford.

== New construction ==
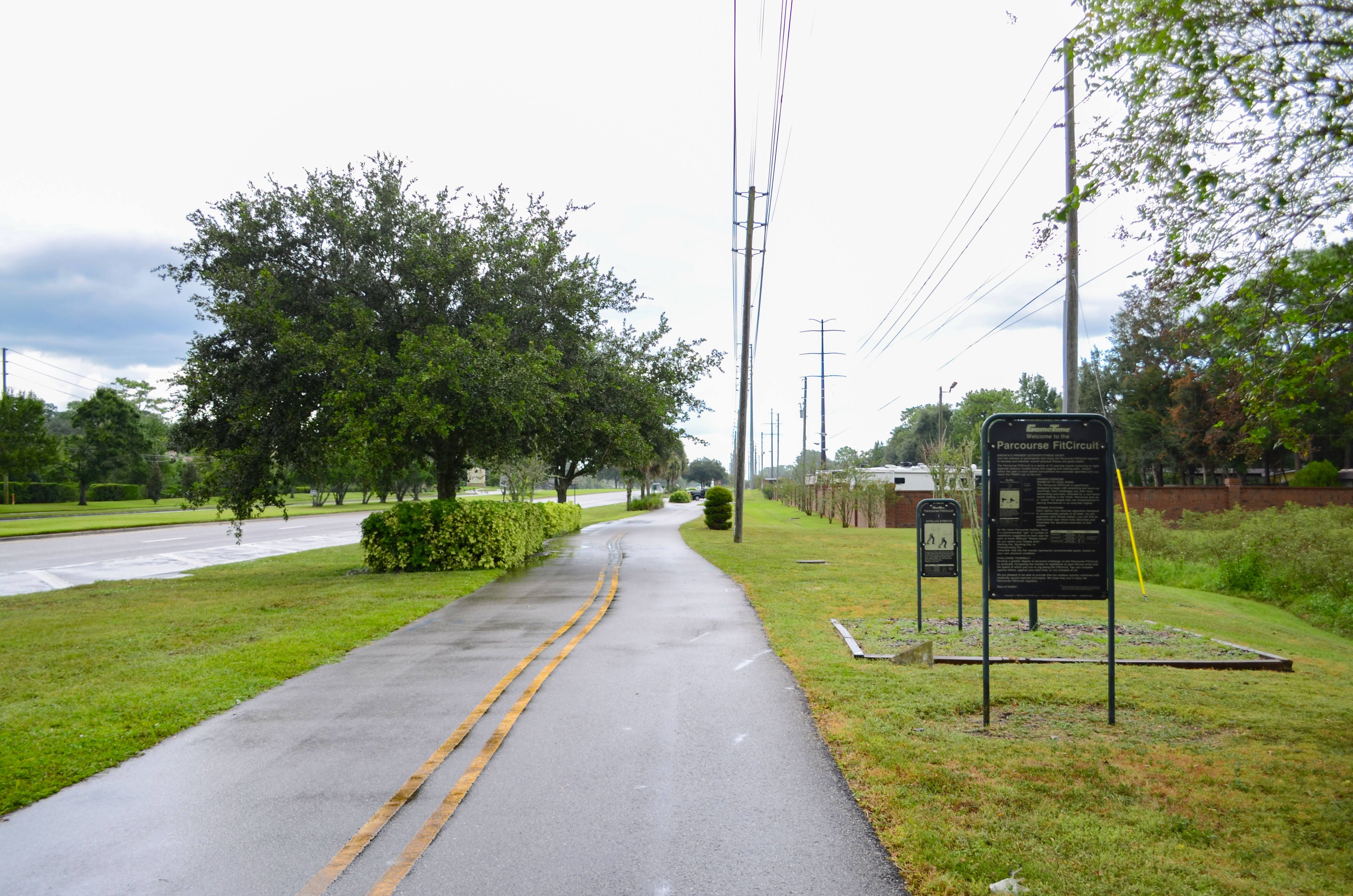
A view of the Cross Seminole Trail in Lake Mary

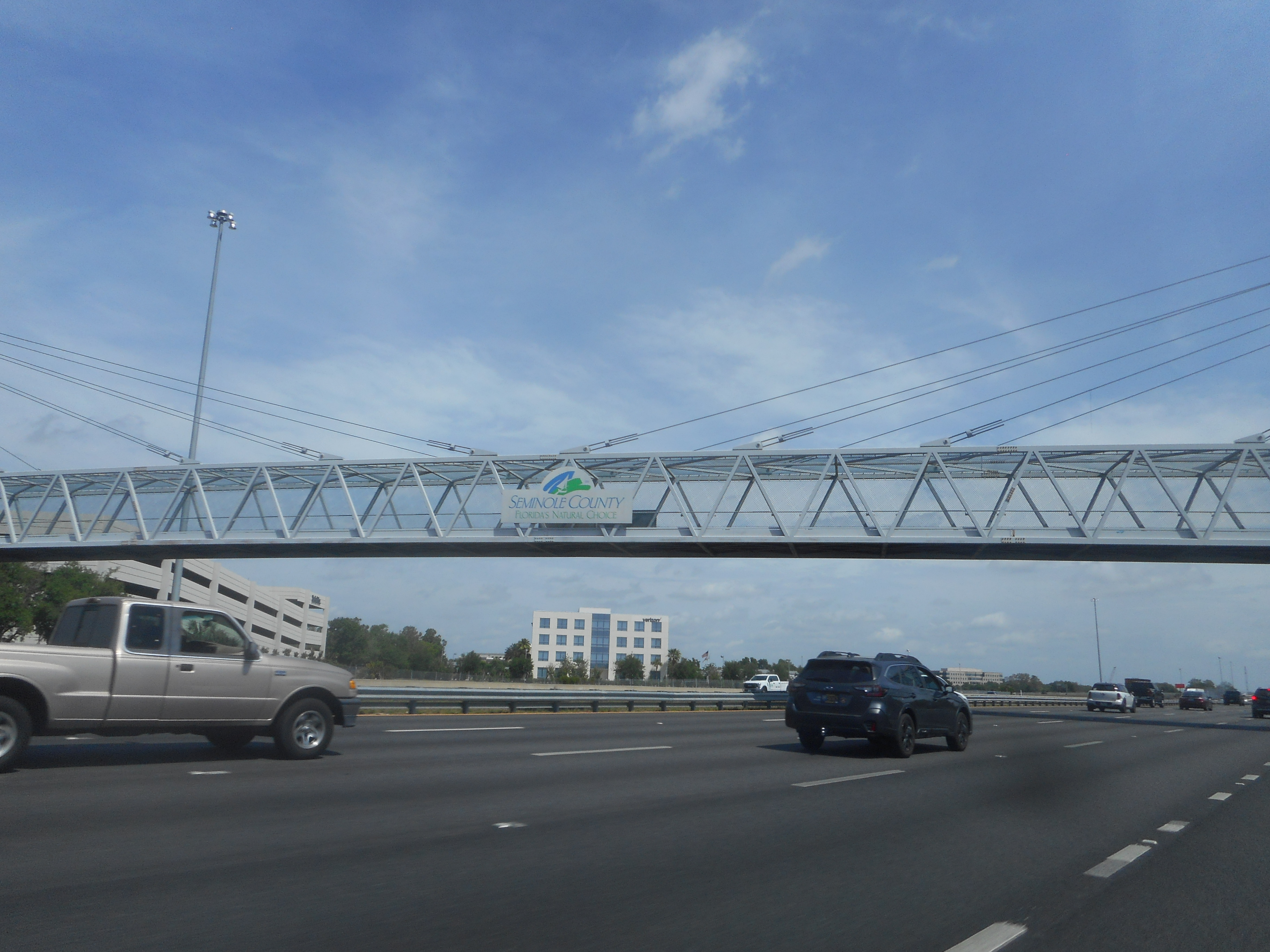
Overpass crossing Interstate 4, connecting to the Seminole Wekiva Trail

Due to the popularity of the trail, plans were made for an expansion of the existing leg near Oviedo and Winter Springs, Florida. In 2007, a new overpass was built that let users cross State Road 434 in Winter Springs. Now, new construction is taking place that will create a 23-mile (37 km) trail in Seminole County, stretching from Lake Mary to Oviedo and then turning south to connect to the Cady Way Trail in Orange County. An overpass was completed in 2010 crossing over the busy U.S. Route 17/92 to accommodate the pedestrian, bicycle, and horse traffic. The overpass allows for connection with Spring Hammock Preserve and creates a new Trailhead at Big Tree Park. This will allow for the preserve and park to get heavier traffic, and to utilize the amenities available which are rather unseen from driving on the highway. With the construction of this overpass, the route is able to continue into Heathrow, in Lake Mary utilizing an existing pedestrian bridge over Interstate 4. See also East Coast Greenway.

Seminole County Public Works finished bridging the 0.6-mile gap in the trail between Layer Elementary School to just north of Old Sanford Oviedo Road in Winter Springs near S.R 419 in the Fall of 2021.

== Historic markers ==
There are four double-sided historic markers alongside the trail.

Historic markers
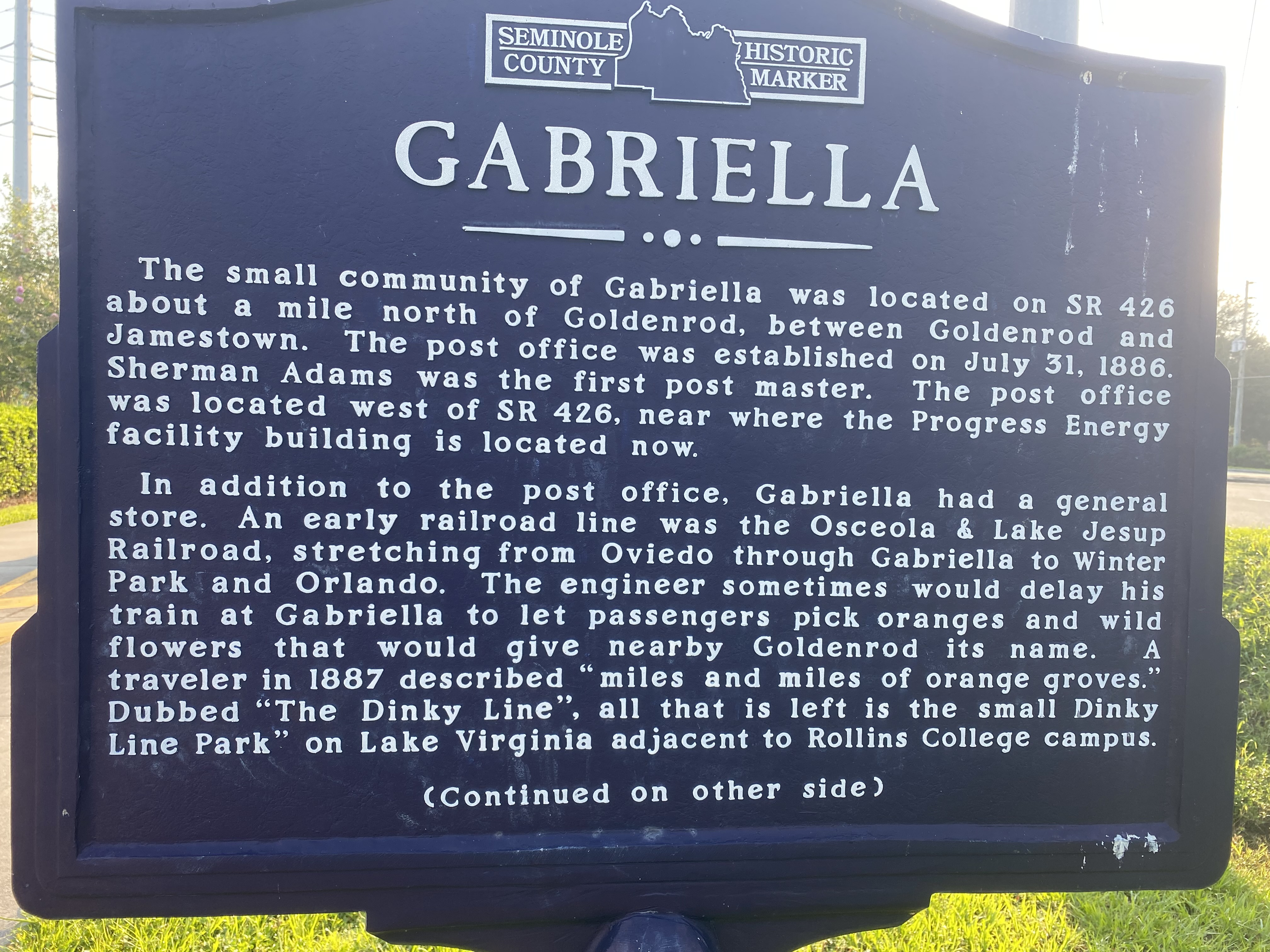

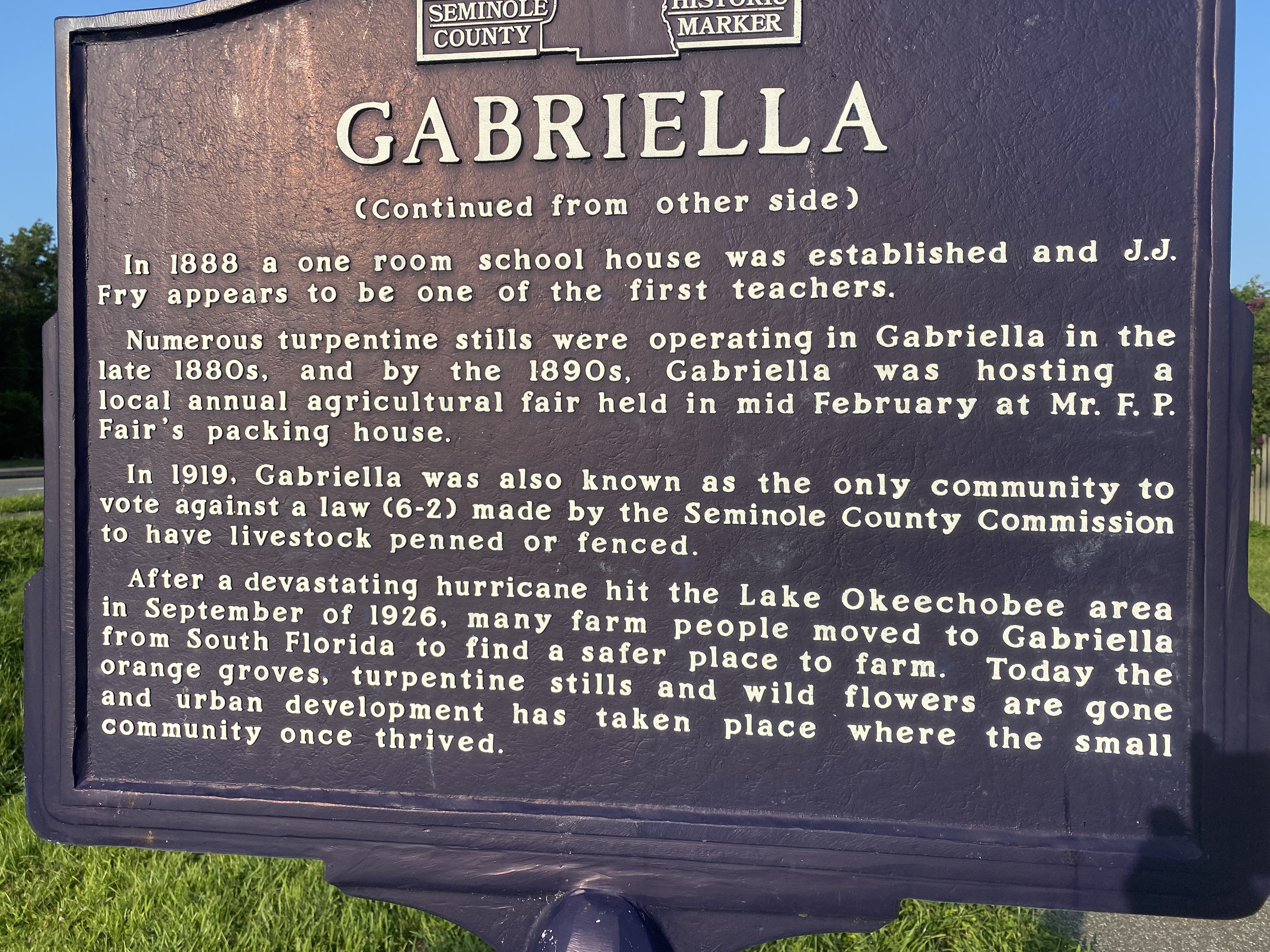

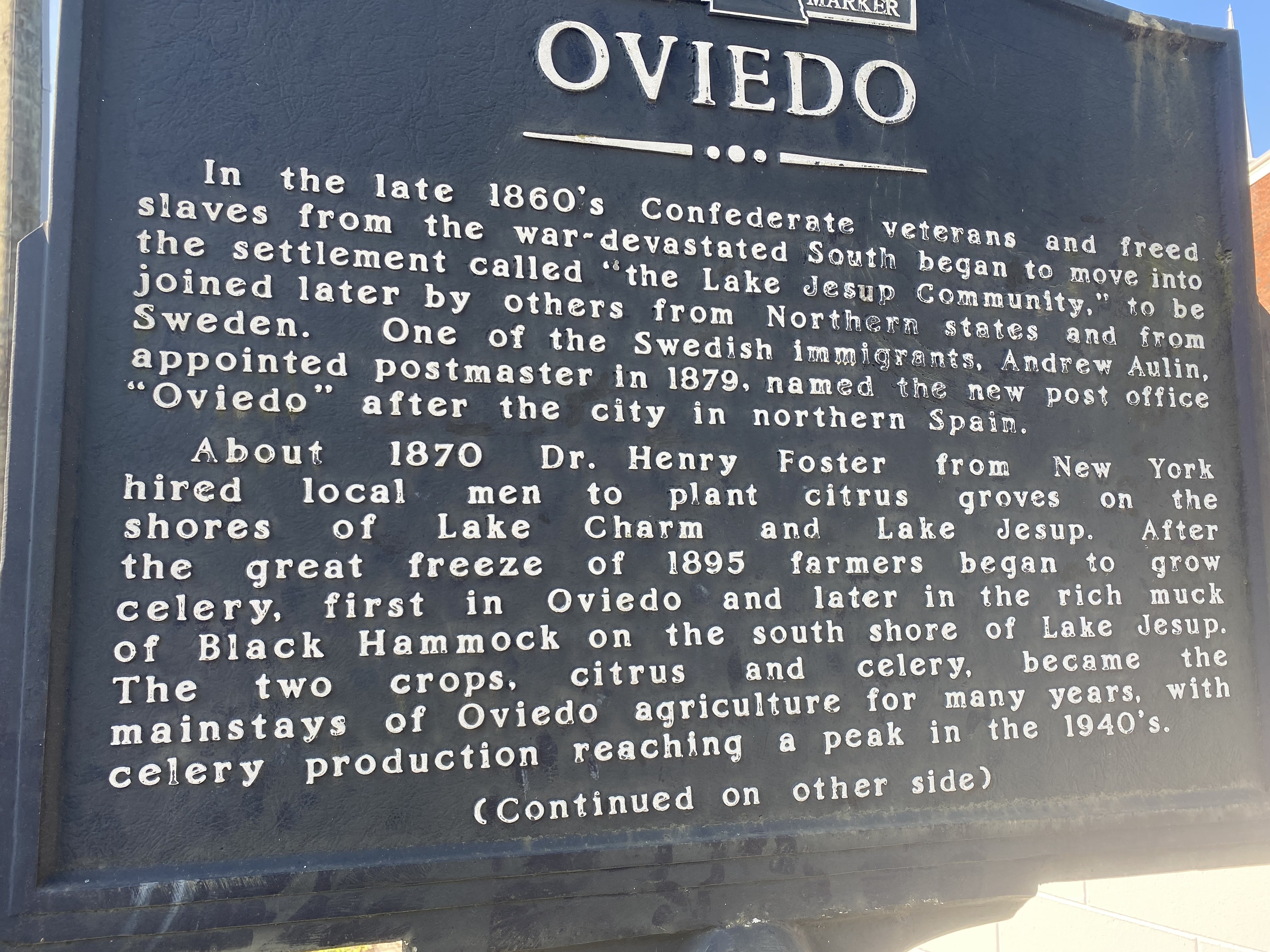

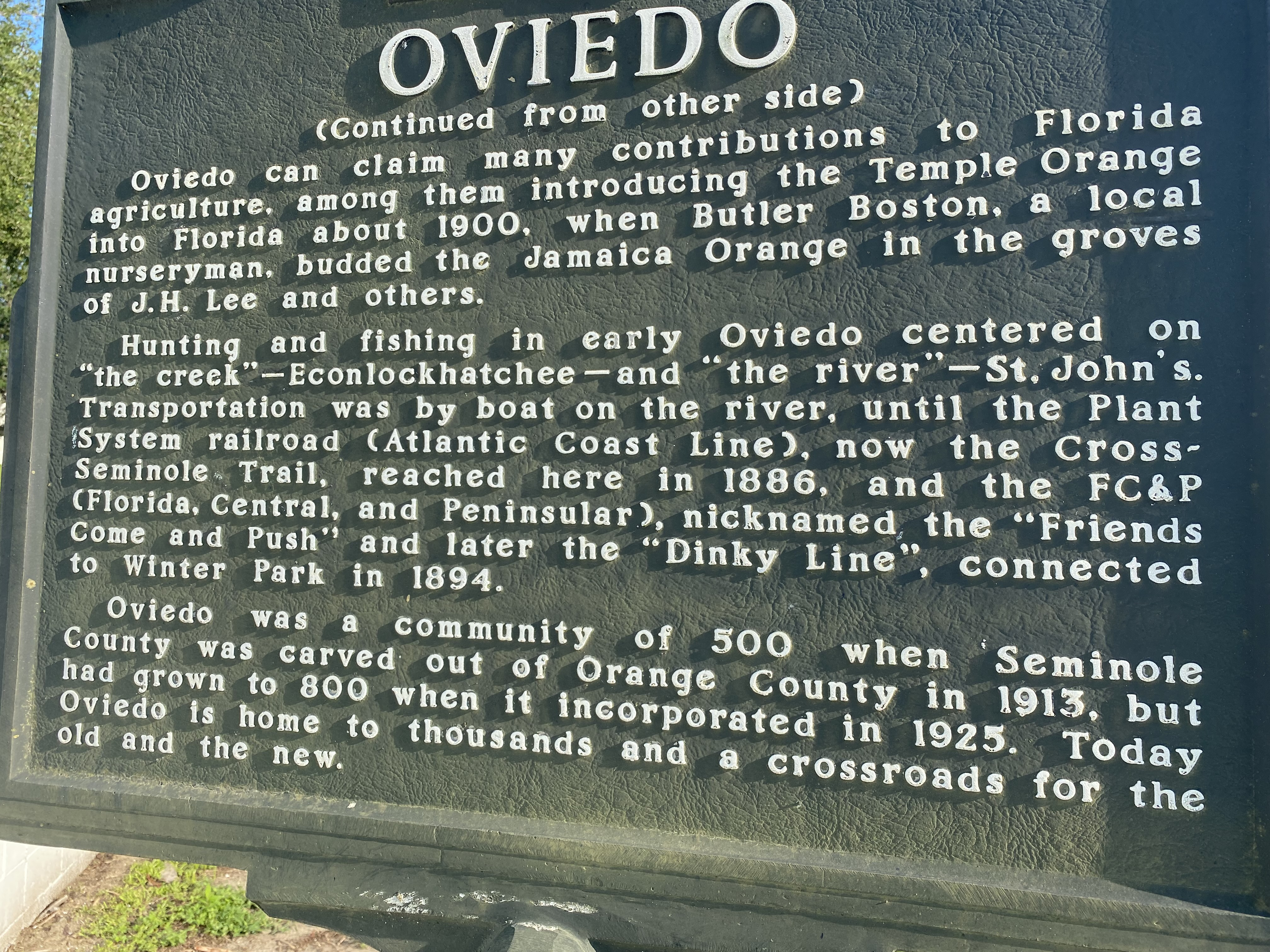

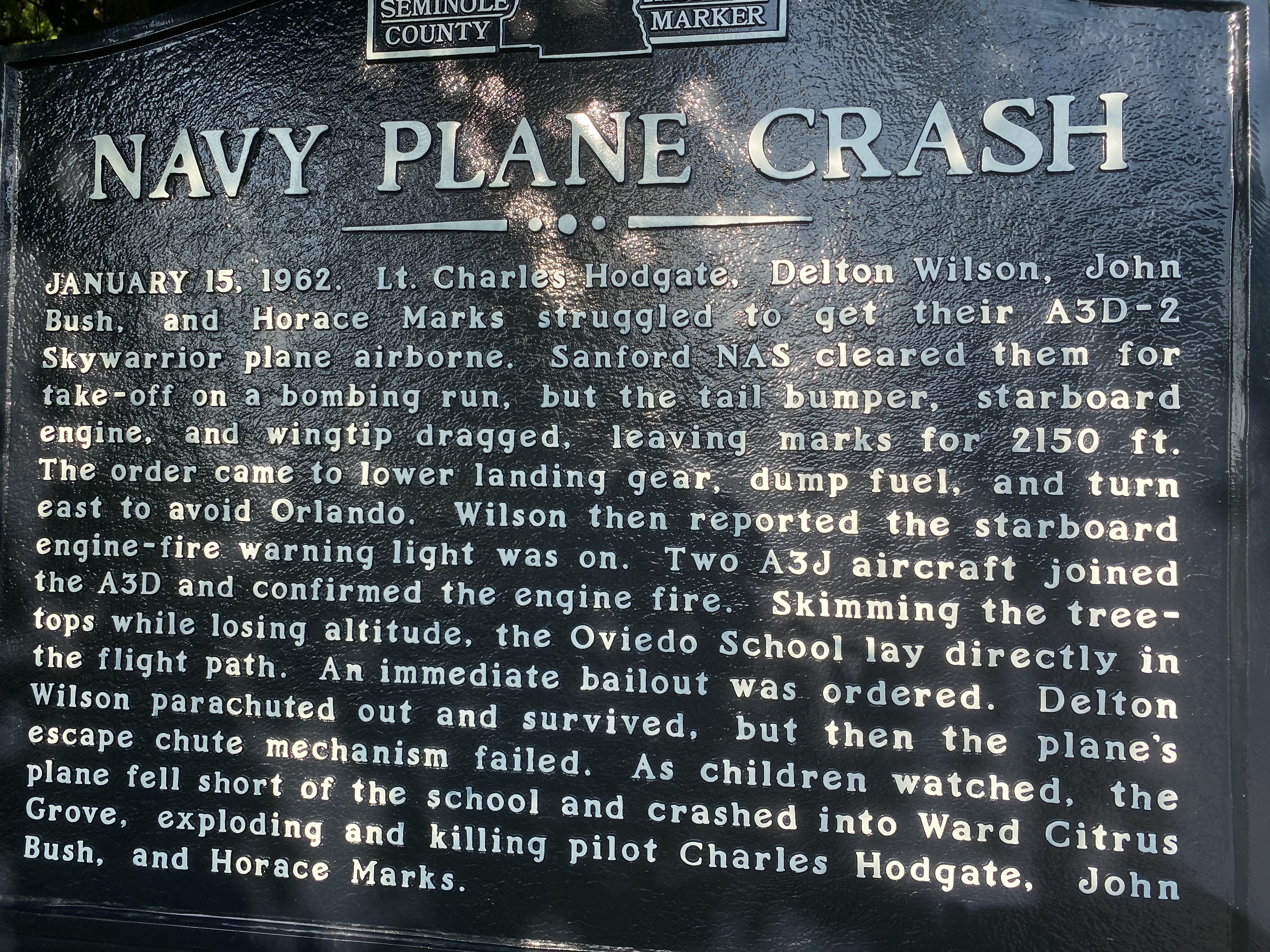

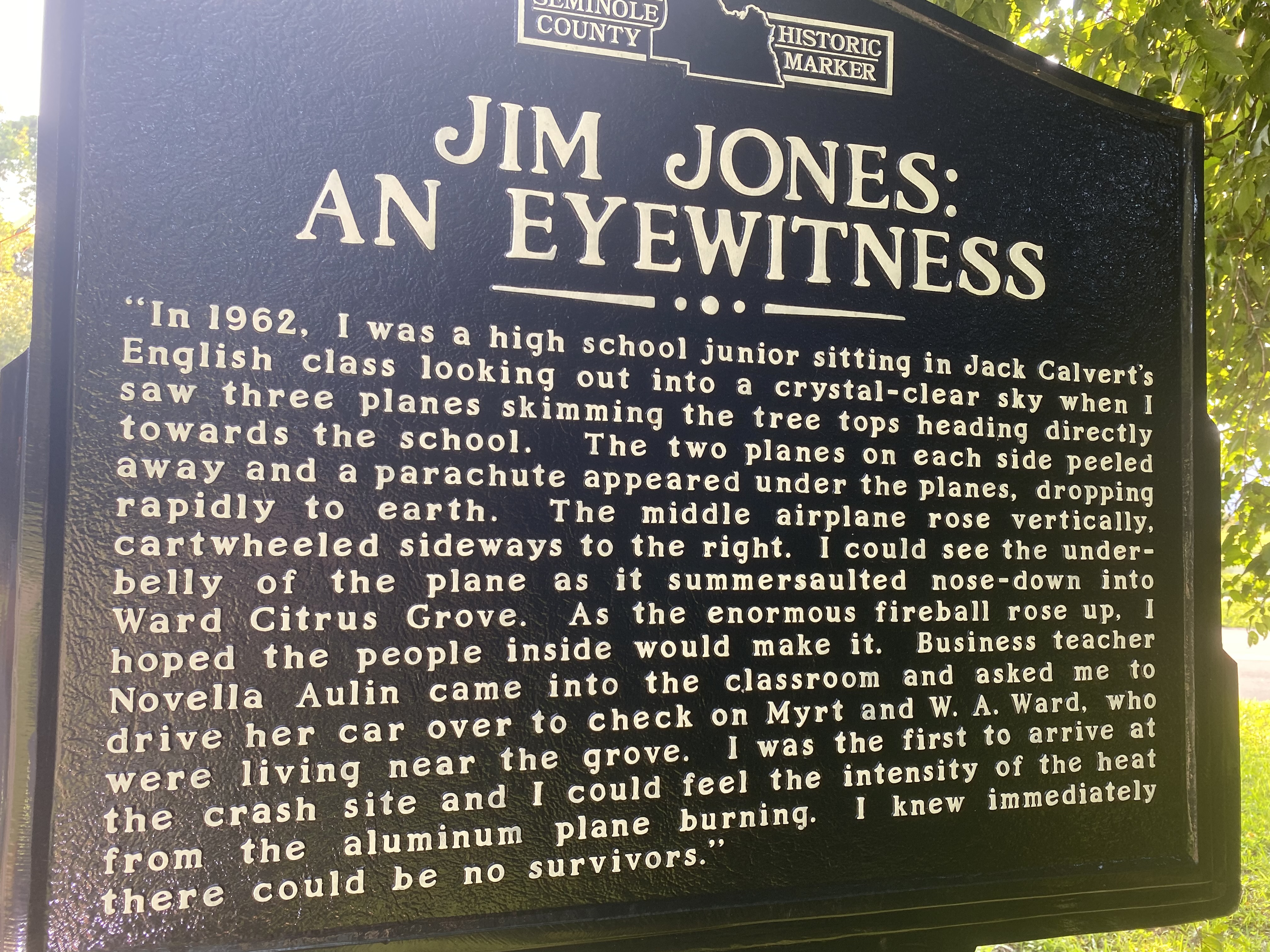

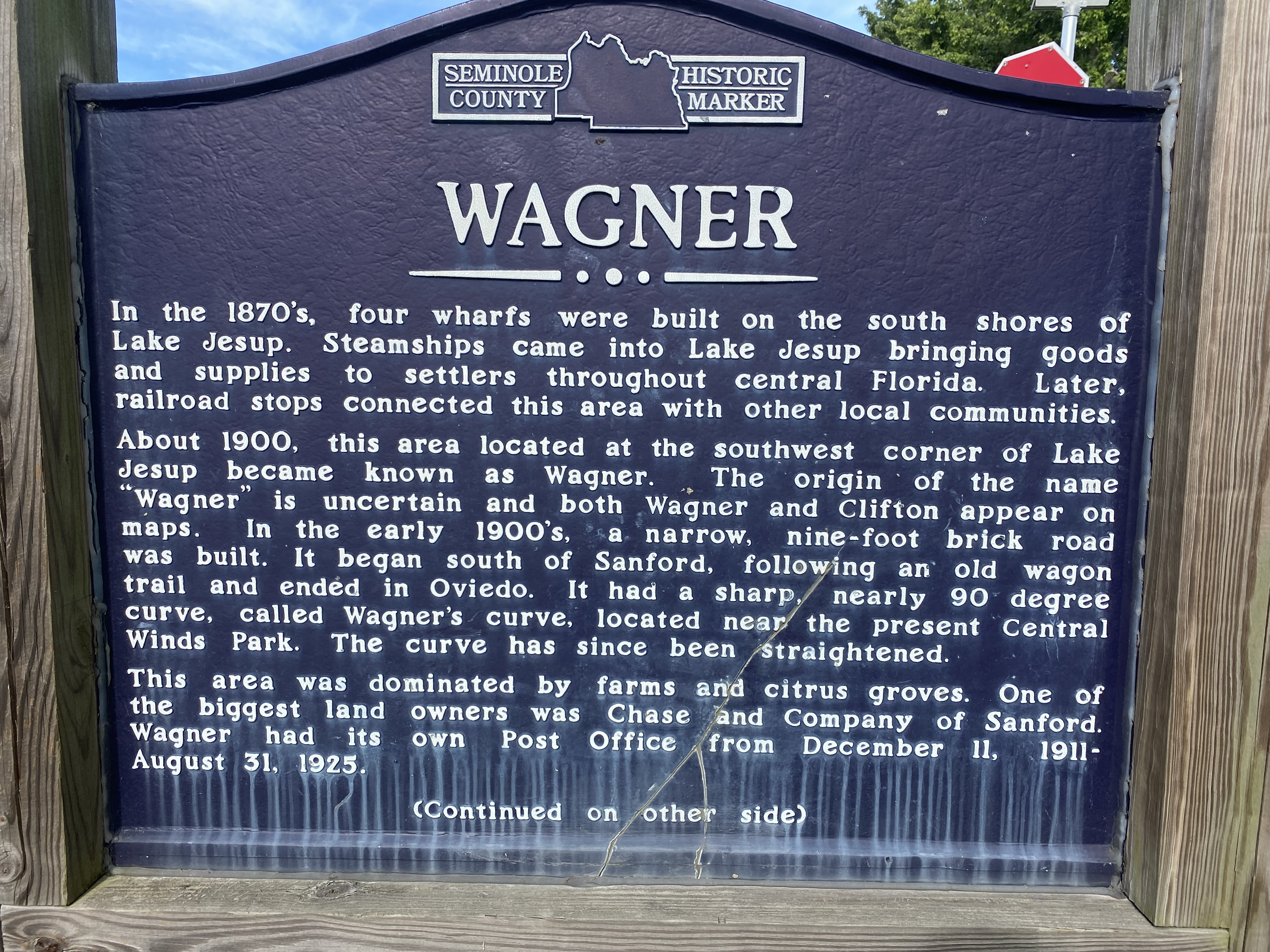

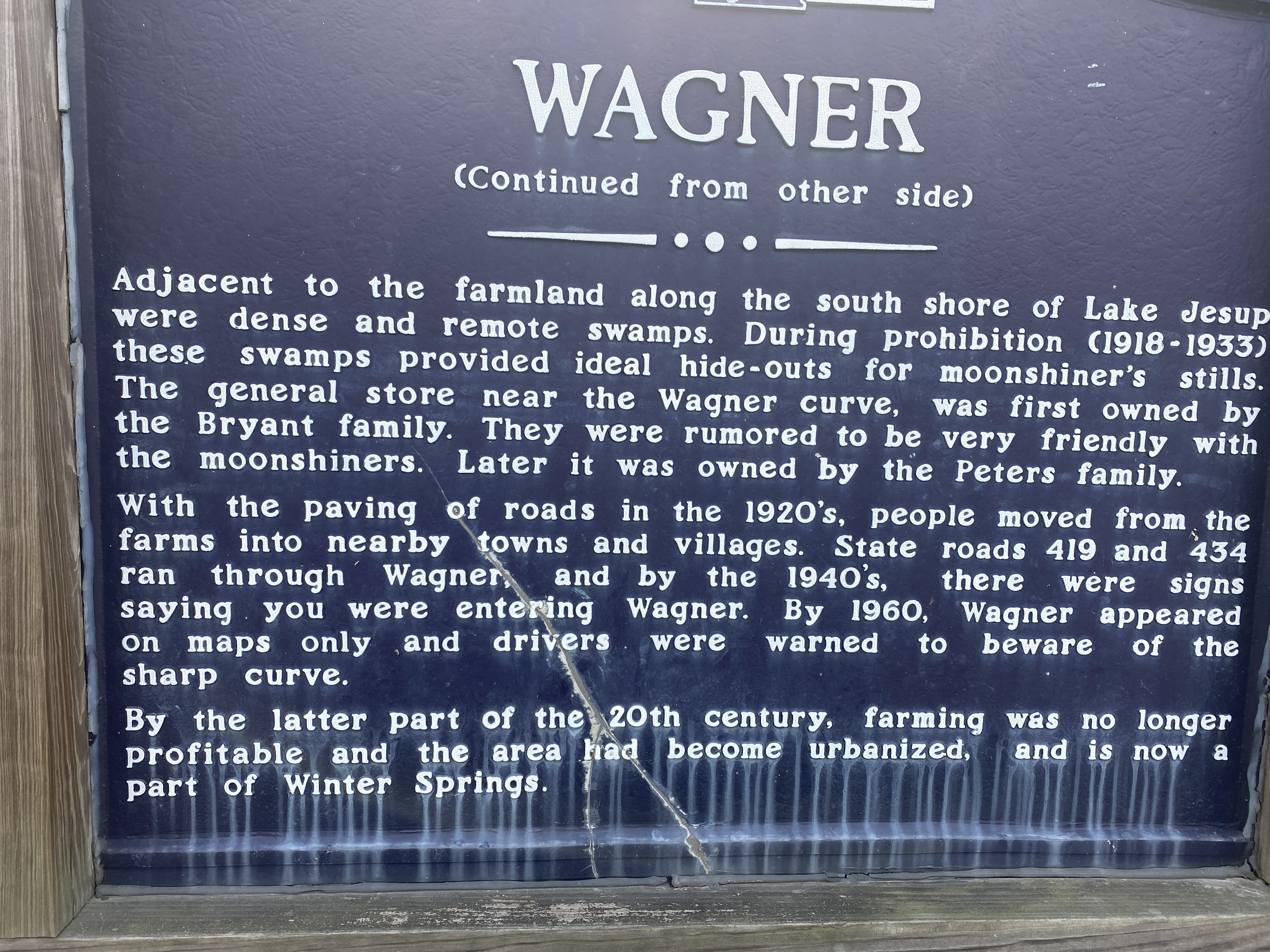

== See also ==
- Seminole Wekiva Trail
- Coast-to-Coast Trail
