= South Lake Trail =

South Lake Trail is a multi-use trail in Lake County, Florida. It is a slightly over 12.5-mile trail encompassing the Lake Minneola Scenic Trail and connecting to the 22-mile West Orange Trail. The trails form part of a planned Central Florida Loop. South Lake Trail is the largest in Lake County. The trail is hilly in parts.

== Route description ==
=== Kilarney ===
The South Lake Trail officially begins its westward journey slightly west of Kilarney Station. A short spur from Kilarney Station to South Lake Trail connects the West Orange Trail to the South Lake Trail. Starting from this spur, the South Lake trail first intersects with Lake Blvd and crosses this small connector road. It continues in a Northwest direction for a short stretch and then begins to turn due west. It runs through a forested section of trail that is the most hilly section on the Trail with some of the largest slopes on the Trail. It goes by the 1.0 Mile Marker and begins to turn northwest where it goes for the next half mile.

=== Eastern Clermont ===
After Mile Marker 1.5, the trail begins to turn towards an intersection with County Road 455 and features a crossing signal and warning lights on the roadway. It then turns due north immediantly after crossing and heads towards the Census-designated area of Roan. The trail then runs along the wooden trail bridge for a short distance allowing views to one side of the swampy area below. It passes by an industrial area entrance and proceeds up another steep hill before passing by Arrowhead Trail that provides access to the community of Arrowhead Estates. It then begins to curve as it runs parallel to the Florida Turnpike for a short stretch before turning to a more due west direction. Along this stretch, the trail intersects the other entrance to the Arrowhead Community at Timucua Place. Slightly past the 3 mile mark, the trail crosses Old County Road 50 just before the entrance to the Greater Hills community. It then turns to the northwest direction for the next mile and passes three separate roads. It first crosses Giovanni Blvd as the road provides trail access to the Verde Ridge neighborhood area. It then a short bit after intersects Balboa Blvd with access also to the Verde Ridge community and the last official entry point. The trail then runs to an interchange with Blackstill Lake Road which is one of the most busy crossings of the trail without a stoplight and can take a few minutes at peak times. After this intersection, the trail travels primarily westward and winds through bends around large trees in this section. The trail then has an exit spur trail that provides access to Pinecrest Academy Road and to and from South Hancock Trail. The trail begins to curve to the north to have a brief parallel direction with Hancock road before turning and crossing Hancock road with a crosswalk at the Northern Old County Road 50 light.

=== Minneola ===
The trail then enters its portion in Minneola and is signed as the Minneola Scenic Trail along mile markers. It first has an access sidewalk to the nearby southern neighborhood before having two intersections with one at Mohawk Road and another at Forestwood Drive. It travels then to the South the Minneola Trailhead park passing by an exit trail connecting to the park and a bike station. It continues along at a cross with Bloxam avenue and proceeds under a bridge with US 27. It then passes a few surface streets at Disston Avenue then at Main Avenue.

=== Downtown Clermont ===
Past its intersection with Main Avenue, the trail is considered in the Downtown Clermont area as it turns and heads southwards along Lake Minneola Drive. It then crosses at East Avenue and enters into the Waterfront Park Area spanning along the lake front. It runs through several large recreational areas including Waterfront Park, Victory Point, Downtown Clermont, West Beach Park, and lastly by the Lake Hiawatha Preserve. After this point, it turns due west to follow CR 565A and passes through more rural area.

=== East Groveland ===
It then follows CR 565A further through the official Groveland limits and enters the area. It passes by rural tree farms and areas before intersecting two neighborhood entrances at Marsh Hammock Way and at Maravilla Way. It then makes its final turn toward the southwest direction that it follows generally along the rest of the trail length. It runs by two more neighborhood entrances at Courtyard Lane and Whooping Drive before having its final intersection at Silver Eagle Drive where a crosswalk and light is present. After this, the trail ends at a turnaround point immediantly after the cross at Silver Eagle Road.

== Future ==
=== South Lake Trail phase IIIB ===
A proposed extension of the South Lake Trail is currently under the Design phase and would extend the Trail to the Southwest running along CR 565A and Eagle Crossing Drive. It would bring the trail to SR 50 where the trail would run parallel to the major road before ending at 2nd Avenue.

=== Coast to Coast Trail ===
Additionally, the FDOT plans to extend the South Lake Trail all the way towards Mabel and entrance to the Van Fleet Trail as part of the Coast to Coast Trail program in Florida.

== See also ==
- Coast-to-Coast Trail
