= West Orange Trail =

Multi-use trail in the United States

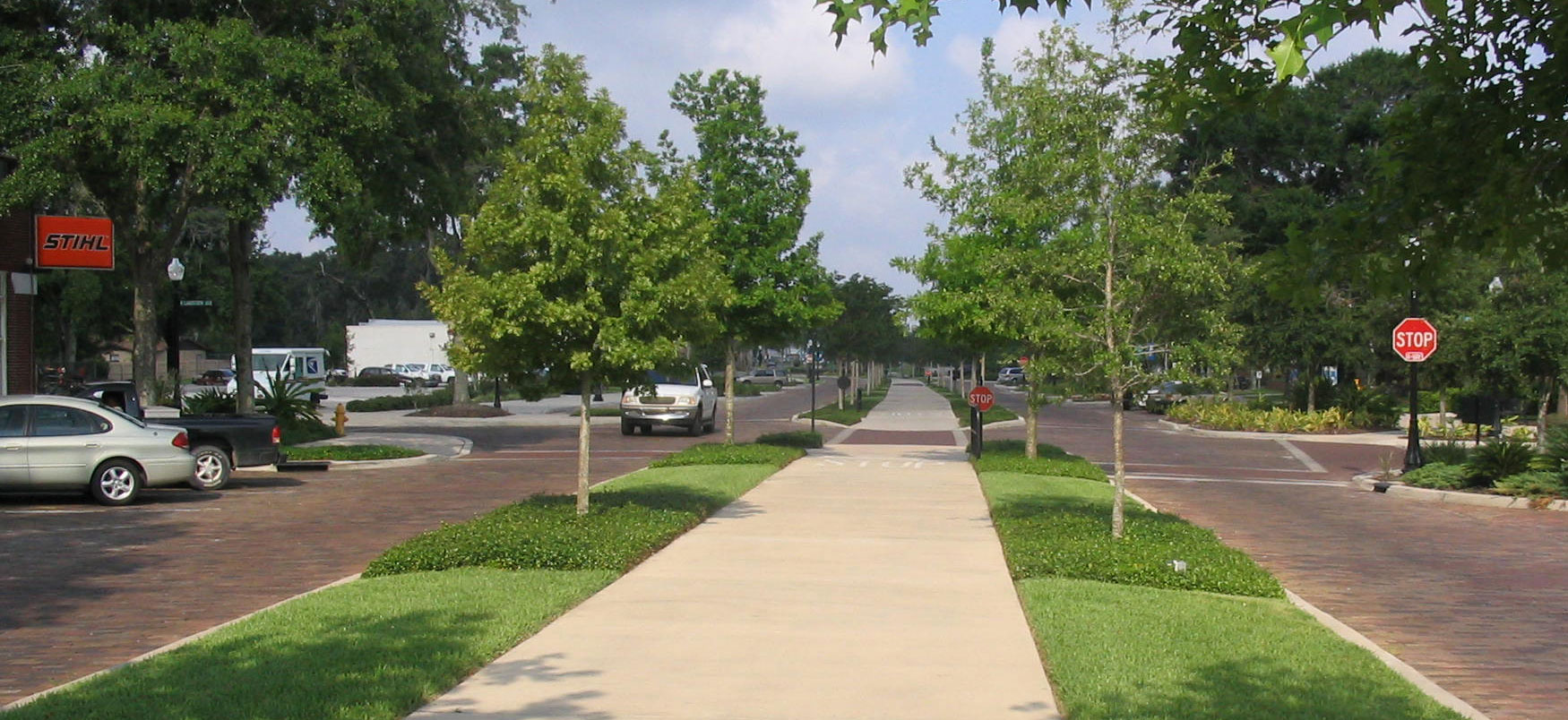
- The trail runs down the median of Plant Street (old SR 438) in downtown Winter Garden.

Multi-purpose Trail
- Length: West Orange Trail: 22 miles (35 km); Connecting trail: 5 miles (8.0 km); South Lake-Lake Minneola Scenic Trail: 7 miles (11 km); Total length: 34 miles (55 km)
- Location: Orange County in Florida, United States with connection to Lake County trails
- Trailheads: Killarney, Florida; Apopka, Florida
- Use: Cycling, walking, hiking, jogging, skateboarding, inline skating
- Difficulty: Easy to moderate
- Season: Year round
- Sights: Oakland Nature Preserve; Butterfly Garden at the Tindenville Outpost; Central Florida Railroad Museum in Winter Garden
- Surface: paved
- Right of way: railroad
- Website: Orange County Parks and Recreation – West Orange Trail

The West Orange Trail is a 22-mile (35 km) long multi-use rail trail owned by Orange County Parks and Recreation in Orange County, Florida, in the United States. The paved trail passes through downtown Oakland, Winter Garden, and Apopka with most of its length built on old railroad alignments. To the west of the West Orange Trail is the South Lake-Lake Minneola Scenic Trail in Lake County which was connected to the trail in 2007.

== Stations ==
There are four main stations on the West Orange Trail, each providing parking, restroom facilities, bike racks and drinking fountains. All have picnic tables and playground and some with concession stands. Bike and skates rental are available at the Killarney Station. The Chapin Station has a basketball court and tennis courts. Parking possibilities are also provided at seven outposts located in between the stations, some with drinking fountain and portable toilet.

- Killarney Station (28°32′48.5″N 81°39′24.7″W) in Killarney near Oakland on SR50 at the Lake/Orange County line, with entrance on 17299 SR438 (Old SR50).
- Winter Garden Station (28°34′0.1″N 81°34′53.1″W) on 455 E. Plant St. in downtown Winter Garden
- Chapin Station (28°34′56.7″N 81°34′4.3″W) on 501 Crown Point Cross Rd. in Winter Garden
- Apopka Station (28°40′35.3″N 81°30′25.4″W) on 111 S. Forest Ave. in Apopka

== The route ==
From the Killarney Station at the county line, the westbound 5-mile (8.0 km) trail is part of the South Lake-Lake Minneola Scenic Trail in Lake County which was connected to the West Orange Trail in 2007. Heading east, all distances on the trail are measured from the Killarney Station which is the Mile zero marker. There is a mile marker every 1/10 mile (0.16 km) to mark your location at the trail, useful during emergencies. The trail runs east towards downtown Oakland over the former Orange Belt Railway where it crosses the Florida Turnpike on a converted railroad bridge. The path passes through the Oakland Nature Preserve on the way through downtown Oakland (Mile 2) where there is an outpost. From Oakland to Winter Garden, the Orange Belt Railway and the Tavares and Gulf Railroad ran right next to each other; the trail uses both rights-of-way. The trail runs through downtown Winter Garden in the median of Plant Street where the railroad used to run, passing through the Winter Garden Station (Mile 5). The trail leaves downtown on the north side of Plant Street (there SR 438).

At 9th Street, the path curves north (along what had been planned as an extension of 9th Street) away from the old railroad grade, to allow the Florida Central Railroad to continue to serve a customer along the line via a connection from another line. The trail rejoins the railroad grade on W. Crown Point Rd where at Mile 7, the Chapin Station is located. The trail leaves again near SR 429 to avoid a complicated crossing of the freeway. The trail heads north to avoid a golf course, then hugs its perimeter heading north then east, passing under SR429, continuing north, east and then south. The trail heads east returning to the railroad grade once again along Clarcona-Ocoee Rd at the junction with Ingram Rd, where the Ingram Outpost is located on Mile 12. The trail heads east towards Clarcona. The Apopka-Vineland Outpost is located before the trail joins the Apopka-Vineland Road heading north, where it stays along its west side for about 550 feet (170 m) and then makes a sudden right, crossing the road to connect to a different railroad grade, the old Florida Midland Railroad, which then heads northward. A spur to Clarcona Horseman's Park Outpost on Damon Rd. continues along the west side of Apopka-Vineland Road.

The trail continues along the old Florida Midland into Apopka, where the Florida Midland ended after around 1900. A recent extension takes it north along a new alignment, and then along the east side of Rock Springs Road, to end at the intersection with Welch Road. The section through downtown Apopka, including a bridge over US 441, opened in June 2007. A future extension is planned east along Welch Road to Wekiwa Springs State Park.

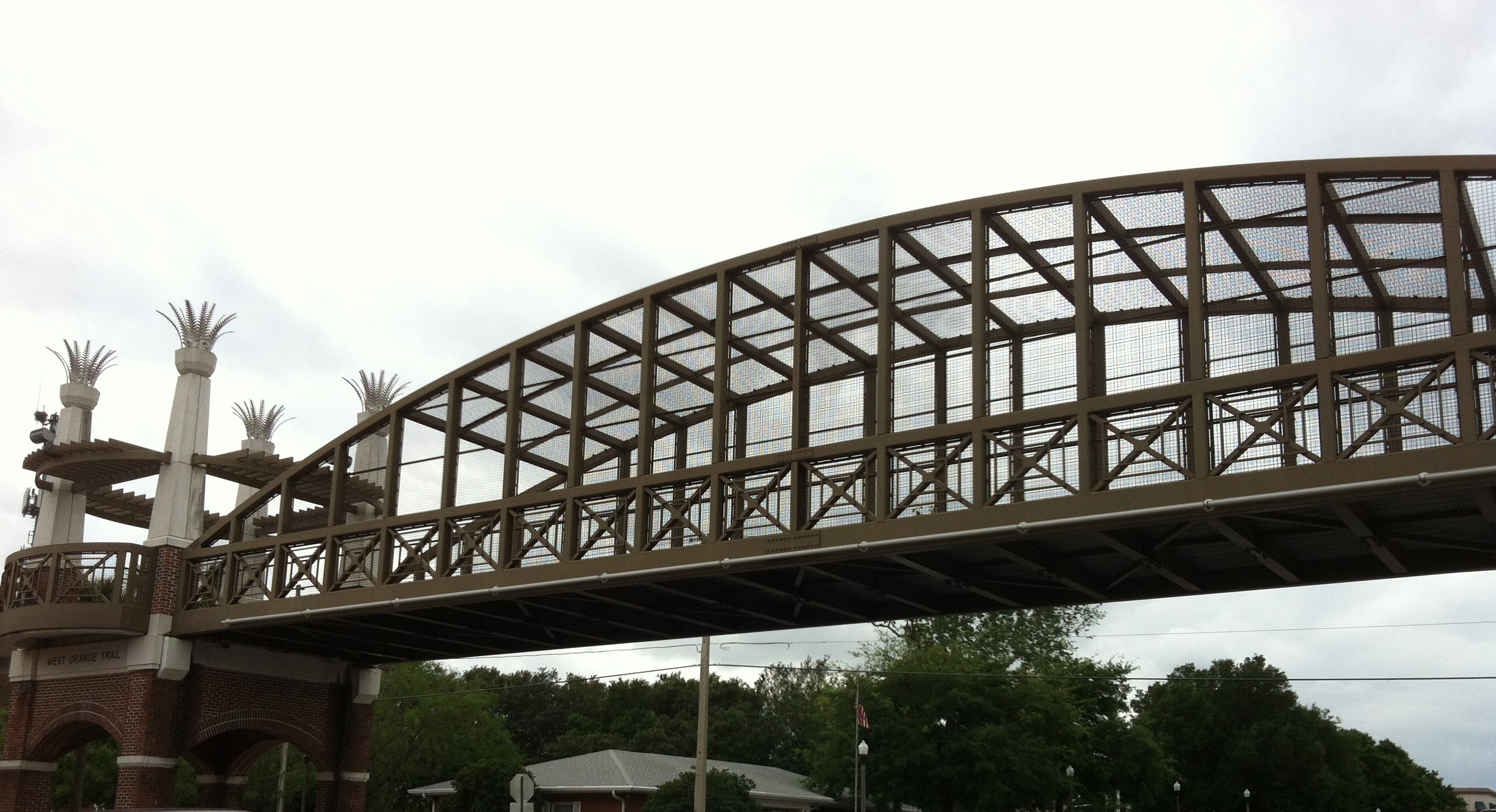
This bridge was built by Orange County, FL and the City of Apopka, FL over U.S. Route 441 connecting two sections of the Rails to Trails system forming the Orange County Bike Trail.

Major sections of the trail are right next to main roads as sidepaths, since the roads were built next to the railroads.

== Grade separations ==
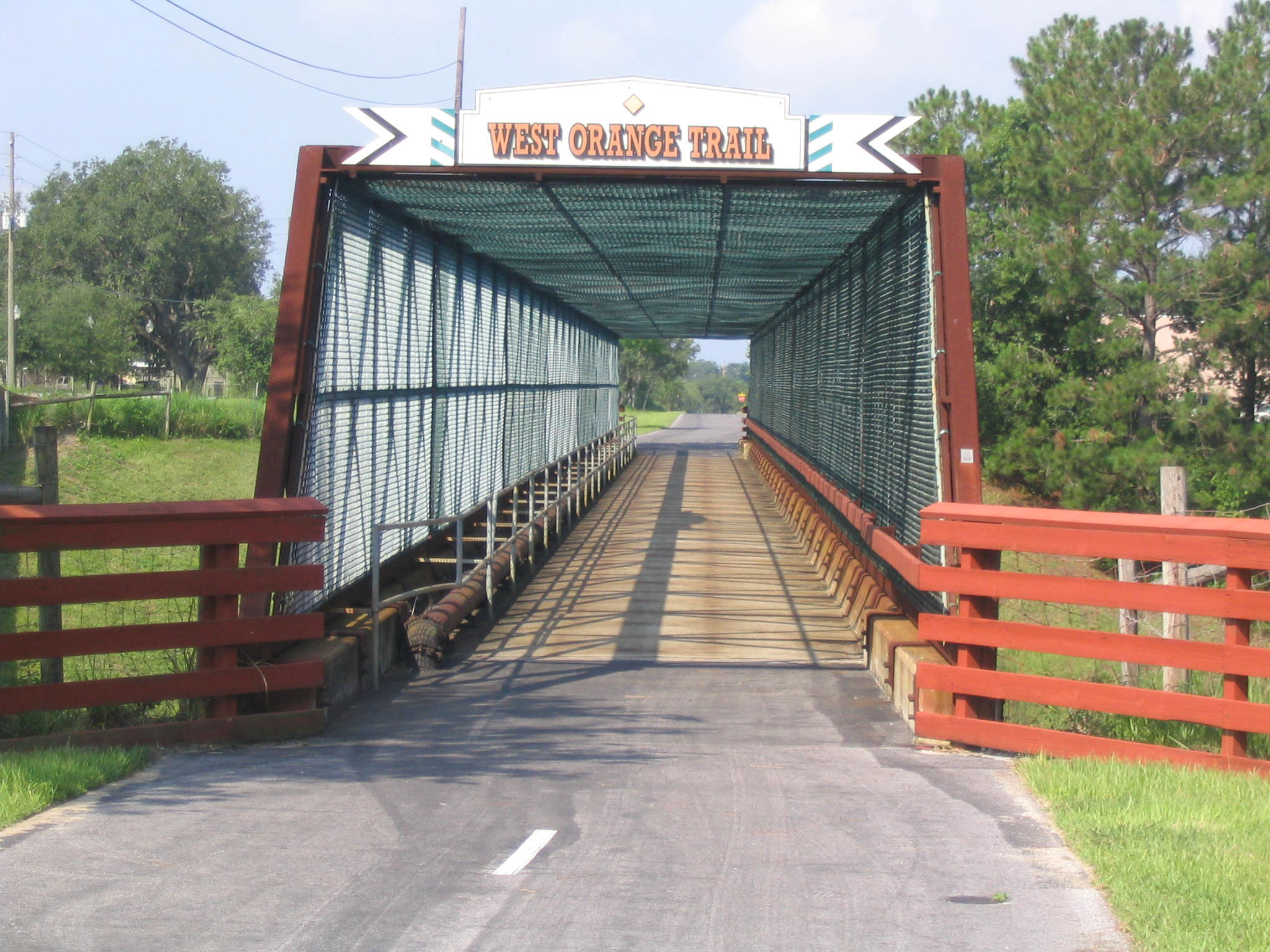
The bridge over Florida's Turnpike, near the western end, was rehabilitated from a bridge on the Orange Belt Railway line.

The following grade separations are provided or planned:

- Florida's Turnpike (old railroad bridge)
- SR 429 (underpass built with the freeway)
- US 441 (SR 500) in Apopka (pedestrian bridge opened in June 2007 at the cost of 5 million dollars.)

== See also ==
- Little Econ Greenway for other trails in Orange County, Florida.
- List of paved Florida bike trails
