= Cady Way Trail =

Rail trail in Orange County, Florida

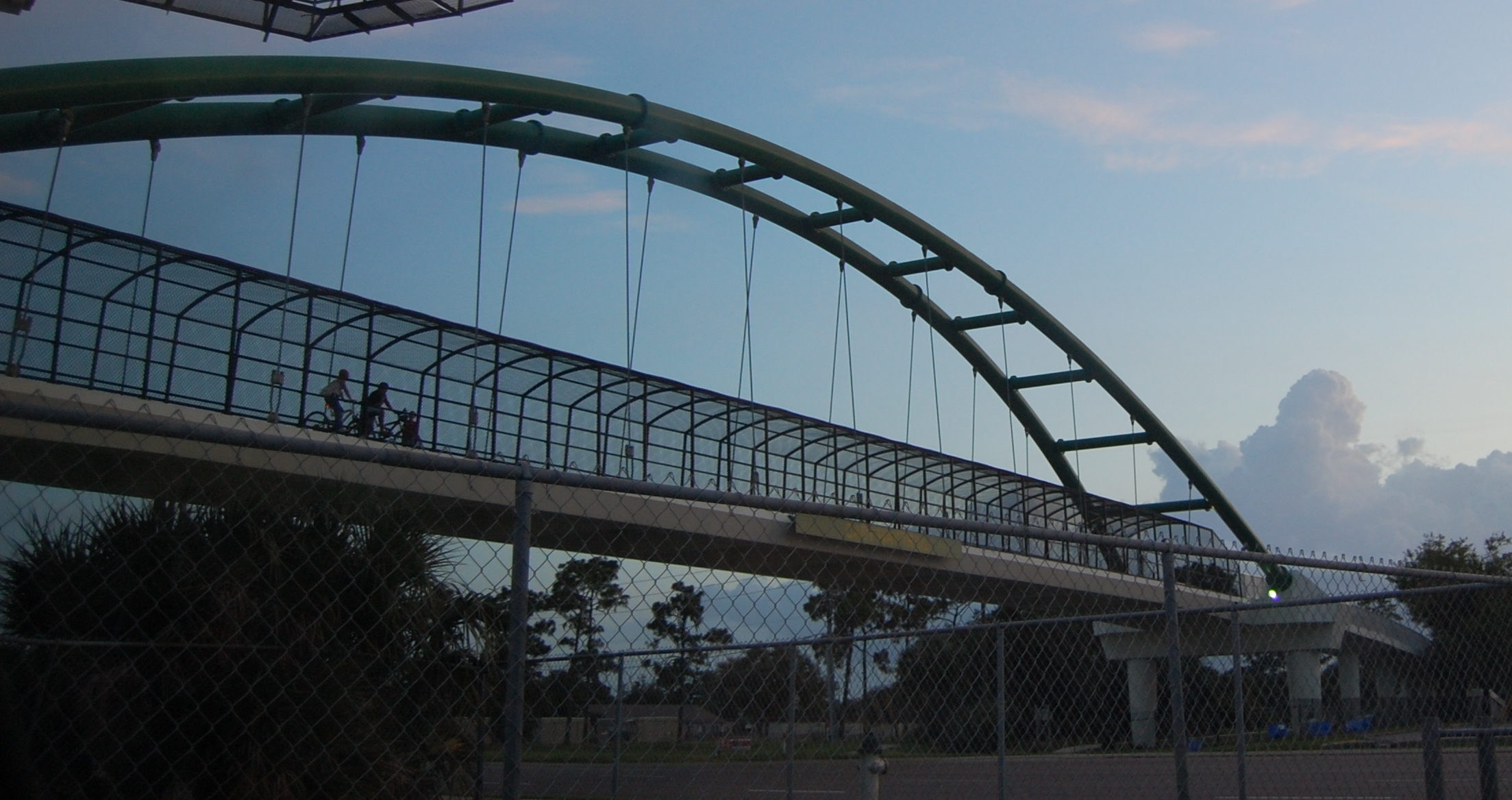
- 28°36′2.25″N 81°18′25.14″W (Taken on July 22, 2009)
- Length: 6 miles (9.7 km)
- Location: Orange County, Florida, US
- Established: 1994

The Cady Way Trail is a rail trail in Orange County, Florida.

== Composition ==
A 6.5-mile (10.5 km) asphalt rail trail, the path follows a railway corridor that previously connected residential and recreational areas of Winter Park, Florida with Orlando Fashion Square and neighborhoods in Orange County, Florida. The trail's single-lane lengths have widths between 10–16 feet (3.0–4.9 m) with striping to separate pedestrians from others; where divided, pedestrians' have a width of six feet (1.8 m), while the other is ten feet (3.0 m). Along its length, the trail has sheltered benches, trash bins, water fountains, and numbered markers.

== History ==
The original Cady Way Trail opened in 1994, and averaged over 500,000 users per year by the 2010s. A second phase of expanding the trail was planned, and has already received one US$1.75 million grant from Federal Highway Administration and Florida Department of Transportation, and another from the Florida Department of Environmental Protection for $483,000.

In April 2012, two Winter Park High School students—Nick Presha and Jeremy Stewart—were executed on the Cady Way Trail. Jesse Davis and Hector Rodriguez (both born in 1981 or 1982) were found guilty of the murders, and sentenced to life imprisonment.
