= Tavares and Gulf Railroad =

- Original Route (click to enlarge)

Overview
- Locale: Central Florida
- Dates of operation: 1886–1969
- Successor: Seaboard Air Line Railroad

Technical
- Track gauge: 4 ft 8 1/2 in (1,435 mm) standard gauge

The Tavares and Gulf Railroad (T&G) was a historic railroad in Central Florida that operated for many years as a subsidiary of the Seaboard Air Line Railroad. It existed from 1886 to 1969.

== Route Description ==
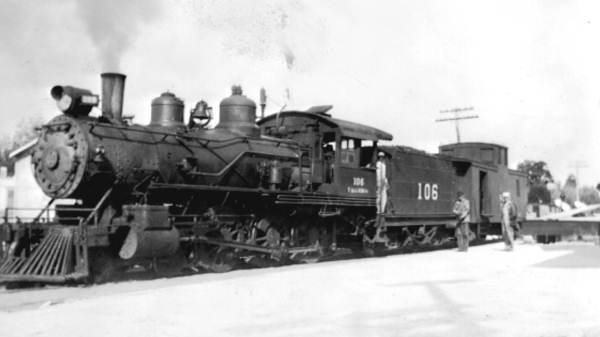
Tavares and Gulf Railroad locomotive

The Tavares and Gulf Railroad began just southeast of Tavares at Ellsworth Junction. From here, it ran south through Astatula and continued south winding through Ferndale and Montverde on the west side of Lake Apopka. Just south of Monteverde was Wait's Junction, where the Tavares and Gulf Railroad split with a line running west to Minneola and Clermont and a line heading east to Winter Garden and Ocoee.

== History ==
The Tavares and Gulf Railroad was first incorporated in 1881 as the Tavares, Apopka and Gulf Railway. As its name suggests, it was intended to run from Central Florida southwest to the Gulf of Mexico near Fort Myers but it never made it that far. Construction began on July 15, 1885, from Ellsworth Junction and 12 miles of the line was complete (to a point near Double Run) in 1886. To reach Tavares, the Tavares and Gulf Railroad had trackage rights from Ellsworth Junction to Tavares on the Tavares, Orlando and Atlantic Railroad (which was later part of the Florida Central and Peninsular Railroad and later the Seaboard Air Line Railroad).

The following year, the line was complete to Minneola and Clermont. The line would not beyond Clermont because the Orange Belt Railway would not permit the Tavares and Gulf from crossing their line there.

In 1890, the railroad was reorganized as the Tavares and Gulf Railroad. A branch from Wait's Junction to Oakland was also completed that year. In 1899, the line was extended to Winter Garden. This extension was built beside and parallel to the Orange Belt Railway. It was extended from Winter Garden to Ocoee in 1915.

The Seaboard Air Line Railroad acquired the T&G in 1926. The Seaboard continued to operate the Tavares and Gulf Railroad as a separate entity.

The line was busy in the 1950s but declined in the 1960s. In 1962, track from Wait's Junction to Clermont was abandoned. The rest of the line west of Winter Garden was abandoned in 1969 (two years after the Seaboard Air Line merged with the Atlantic Coast Line Railroad).

== Current conditions ==
The only remaining track still in service today is a short stretch from Ocoee to Winter Garden. It is operated by the Florida Central Railroad.

From Winter Garden to Oakland, the West Orange Trail runs along the right of way of both the Orange Belt Railway and the Tavares and Gulf Railroad where they ran right next to each other. A portion of the Lake Apopka Loop Trail runs on the former right of way as part of the Green Mountain Scenic Overlook and Trailhead near Ferndale. The Monteverde Greenway Trail also runs on the former right of way near Monteverde.

== Historic stations ==
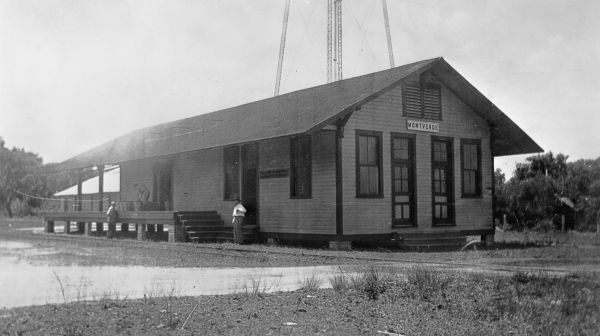
Monteverde depot

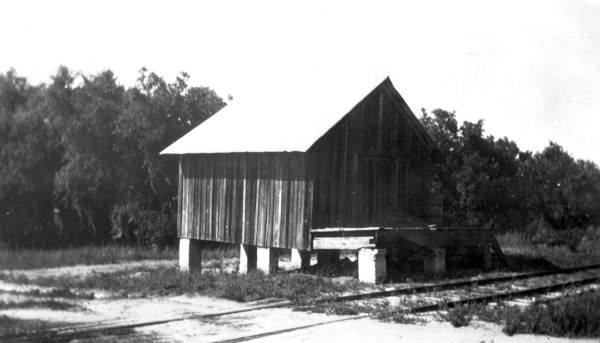
Minneola depot

Tavares to Ocoee
Milepost	City/Location	Station	Connections and notes
0.0	Tavares	Tavares	located on Tavares, Orlando and Atlantic Railroad (SAL) and accessed through trackage rights
3.4		Ellsworth Junction	junction with Tavares, Orlando and Atlantic Railroad (SAL)
7.0		Sunbeam	
7.8	Astatula	Astatula	
11.0		Double Run	
15.2	Ferndale	Ferndale	also known as West Apopka
18.3	Montverde	Montverde	
21.9		Wait's Junction	junction with line to Clermont
24.0		Bear Gap	
25.5	Killarney	Killarney	junction with Orange Belt Railway (ACL)
27.1	Oakland	Oakland	
28.2	Tildenville	Tildenville	
29.0		Brayton	
29.4	Winter Garden	Winter Garden	
32.2	Ocoee	Ocoee	junction with Florida Midland Railway (ACL)

Wait's Junction to Clermont
Milepost	City/Location	Station	Connections and notes
0.0		Wait's Junction	
1.0		Crenshaws	
3.0		Mohawk	
5.0	Minneola	Minneola	
6.0		Louise	
7.0	Clermont	Clermont	junction with Orange Belt Railway (ACL)
