= Orange Belt Railway =

Former railroad in Florida, US

Overview
- Locale: Central Florida and Tampa Bay
- Dates of operation: 1888–1893
- Successor: Sanford & St. Petersburg Railroad; Plant System; Atlantic Coast Line Railroad

Technical
- Track gauge: 3 ft (914 mm) narrow gauge

The Orange Belt Railway (later known as the Sanford & St. Petersburg Railroad) was a 3 ft (914 mm) narrow gauge railroad established in 1885 by Russian exile Peter Demens in Florida. It was one of the longest narrow gauge railroads in the United States at the time of its completion in 1888, with a mainline 152 miles (245 km) in length between Sanford and St. Petersburg. It carried citrus, vegetables, and passengers; and it interchanged with two standard gauge lines: the Jacksonville, Tampa and Key West Railway at Lake Monroe, and the Florida Central and Peninsular Railroad at Lacoochee.

The railway changed hands several times in its early years due to debt run up during various phases of construction and a citrus freeze that affected freight cargo. Demens lost the railroad to financier Edward Stotesbury, who reorganized it as the Sanford & St. Petersburg Railroad in 1893. After the Great Freeze of 1894–95, the railroad was put up for sale. It was purchased by Henry B. Plant in 1895, who converted it to standard gauge, and made it part of the Plant System. Plant would build a hotel along the line, the Belleview-Biltmore Hotel near Clearwater, in 1897. The Plant System became part of the Atlantic Coast Line Railroad system in 1902. The Orange Belt Railway line brought settlers to towns along its route and fostered development in the region. Sections are now part of rail to trails programs.

A 2012 musical titled "Orange Belt Railroad" and based on the railroad line's history was created by Richard J. Budin, a member of West Coast Players in Clearwater, Florida.

== History ==
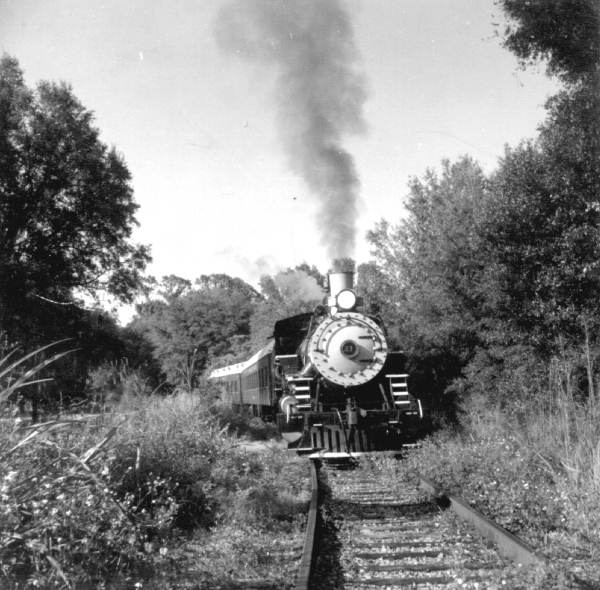
Orange Belt train approaching San Antonio

=== Construction and early years ===
The original Orange Belt Railway was chartered in 1885 by men seeking to build a 35-mile 3 ft (914 mm) gauge line from Lake Monroe (part of the St. Johns River) to Lake Apopka in Florida. They purchased $9,400 worth of crossties from Russian immigrant Peter Demens' sawmill in Longwood, and had to turn over their railroad when they were unable to pay. Demens formed the Orange Belt Investment Co., borrowed money from friends, and launched a $50,000 bond issue to complete the rail line to Oakland, east of Clermont.

Oakland pioneer James Gamble Speer gave Demens a half-interest in 200 acres to encourage Demens to bring the railroad line to Oakland. Demens agreed to move the headquarters and train maintenance shop of his Orange Belt Improvement Co. to Oakland from Longwood. Soon after the first train reached Oakland in November 1886, Demens decided to extend the line 110 miles to the Gulf of Mexico.

The Armour meat packing family in Chicago helped fund the line's extension from Trilby to San Antonio (Florida). The first train carried construction materials and arrived in San Antonio on November 27, 1887. The first passenger train arrived in San Antonio on February 13, 1888.

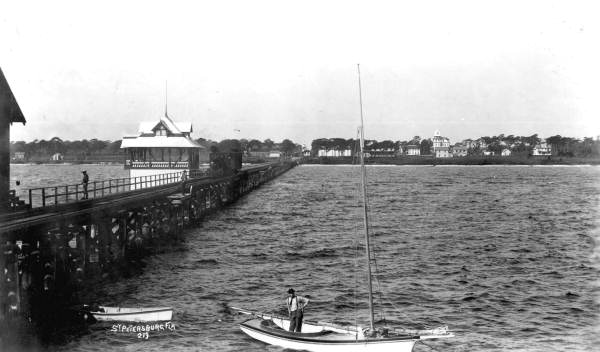
Pier at the terminus in St. Petersburg

While Demens was building the Orange Belt Railway in the 1880s with a planned western terminus in the Tampa Bay area, Hamilton Disston offered Demens approximately 60,000 acres (240 km^{2}) of land to stretch his railroad to Disston City. Demens countered with a demand of an additional 50,000 acres (200 km^{2}) but Disston refused, mistakenly believing that Disston City would thrive if the railroad merely came close to the area. Disston City never met Disston's expectations, and it became the small city of Gulfport. Around the same time, John Constantine Williams negotiated with Demens and offered part of his land holdings in exchange for a southern terminus near what Demens named St. Petersburg, after his childhood home in Russia.

On January 13, 1888, the Orange Belt Railway reached Tarpon Springs; on May 1, 1888, it was completed to St. Petersburg. The rail line played a major role in the development of several towns along its route including San Antonio, Sutherland (now Palm Harbor), Ozona, Dunedin, Clearwater, and Largo.

A lot of debt was run up in order to get the line completed and it was sold by Demens in 1889. The railroad entered receivership in 1893 and was sold by the court right back to its owners, who reorganized it as the Sanford and St. Petersburg Railroad. The Great Freeze of 1894–95 damaged citrus trees and hurt the citrus trade's freight business, causing the line to be sold to Henry B. Plant in 1895. The railway then became part of the Plant System. The Plant System also owned the South Florida Railroad, whose Pemberton Ferry Branch crossed the Sanford and St. Petersburg Railway at Trilby, making Trilby a major junction for the Plant System. Once in control of the line, the Plant System immediately converted the most profitable section of track, from Trilby to St. Petersburg, to 4 ft 8 1/2 in (1,435 mm) standard gauge. The section of the line from Trilby to Sanford remained 3 ft (914 mm) narrow gauge for the line's remaining years under Plant System stewardship and was run in conjunction with the connecting line of the Florida Midland Railway (also taken over by the Plant System), which was converted from 4 ft 8 1/2 in (1,435 mm) standard gauge to 3 ft (914 mm) narrow gauge to allow the sharing of equipment on the two lines.

=== 1902-1967: Atlantic Coast Line ownership ===
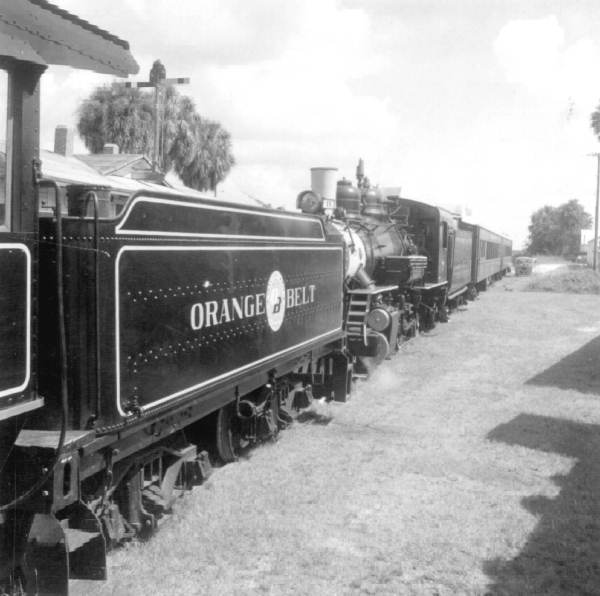
Orange Belt Railway steam locomotives

Trilby—St. Petersburg Line

Overview
- Status: Some segments are still operating
- Owner: Atlantic Coast Line Railroad

Technical
- Track gauge: 1,435 mm (4 ft 8 1/2 in) standard gauge
- Electrification: No

The Plant System became part of the Atlantic Coast Line Railroad in 1902. By this time, seven miles of the line had been removed between Sanford and Sylvan Lake with the former Sanford and Lake Eustis Railway (another Plant System/Atlantic Coast Line route) providing that connection as it was more direct. Under the Atlantic Coast Line's ownership, the line was designated as the Trilby Branch (T Branch) from Sylvan Lake to Trilby, and from Trilby west it was designated as the Trilby–St. Petersburg Line (RE Line). The line from Trilby to St. Petersburg would become the route of the St. Petersburg section of the Atlantic Coast Line's West Coast Champion. By 1949, this segment was served daily by the West Coast Champion, the Southland, an additional local passenger train, and a local freight train. At the same time, a daily mixed train operated from Sanford to Trilby.

=== Later years ===
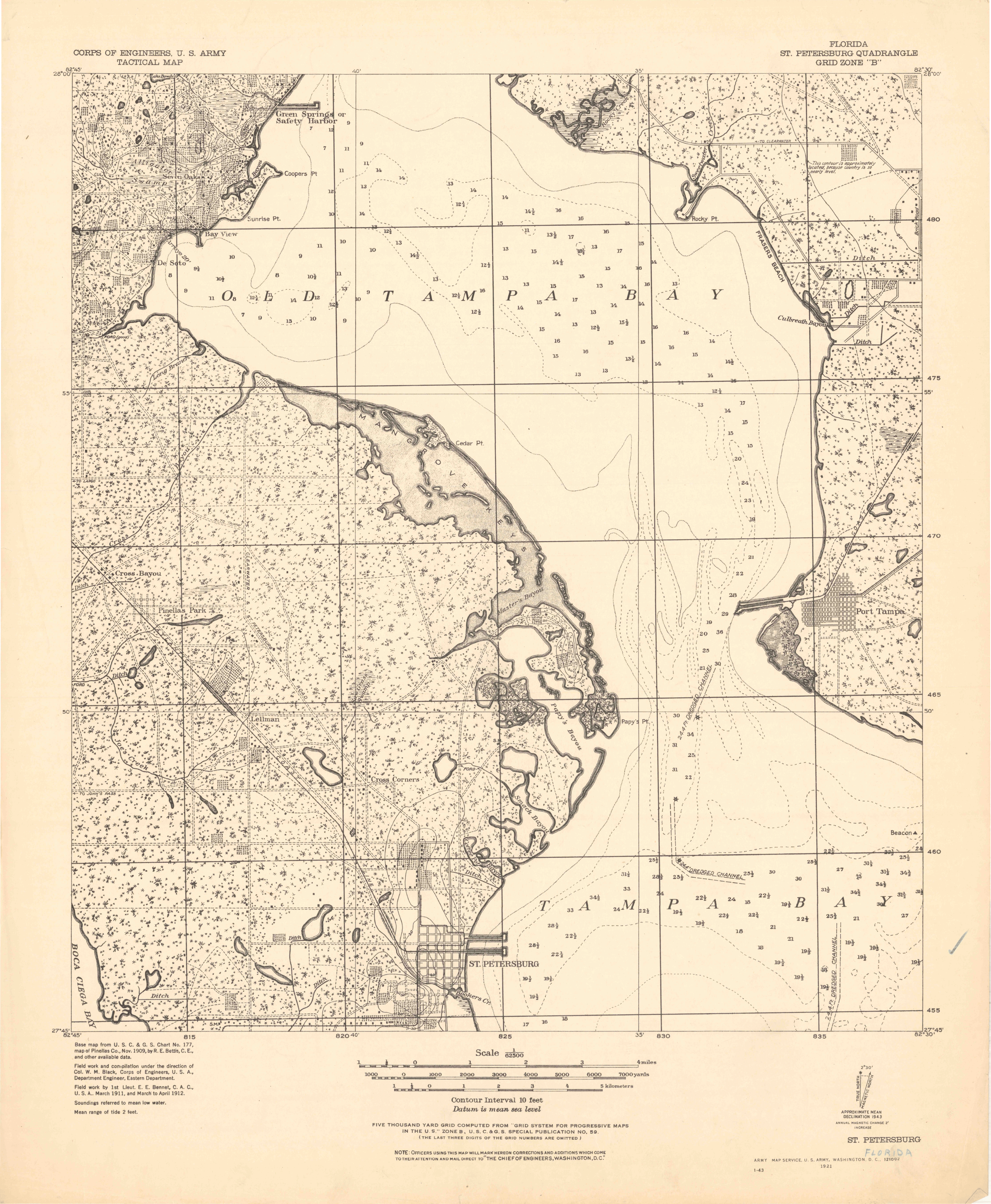
1921 Map of St. Petersburg showing the Orange Belt railway in the lower Pinellas peninsula.

The Atlantic Coast Line merged with its rival, the Seaboard Air Line Railroad, in 1967 to form the Seaboard Coast Line Railroad (SCL). The line remained mostly intact after the merger, though by then it was a freight-only route and its importance to the combined SCL was diminished. Track from Sylvan Lake to Trilby was initially classified as part of the Sylvan Lake Subdivision after the merger. Though by the end of 1967, it was redesignated as the Trilby Subdivision.

The section from Trilby to St. Petersburg was then known as the St. Petersburg Subdivision. The Champion continued to run the line from Trilby to St. Petersburg along with a local passenger train and a local freight train after the merger. The Silver Star was also rerouted on to the line from just south of Clearwater (where it joined from the former Seaboard Air Line track) to St. Petersburg. Passenger service north of Clearwater was discontinued in 1971 after the Seaboard Coast Line's passenger service was taken over by Amtrak. Though, Amtrak would continue to run the Silver Star, the Floridian, and the Champion (which was replaced by the Silver Meteor in 1979) from Clearwater to St. Petersburg until 1984, when all passenger service to Pinellas County was discontinued. By 1972, freight service was discontinued on much of the line, and by 1978, tracks were removed between Tarpon Springs and Groveland. Remaining track from Belleair to Tarpon Springs was then designated the Dunedin Subdivision while track south to St. Petersburg became part of the Yeoman Subdivision (which included the ex-SAL line from Clearwater to Tampa).

In 1980, the Seaboard Coast Line's parent company merged with the Chessie System, creating the CSX Corporation. The CSX Corporation initially operated the Chessie and Seaboard Systems separately until 1986, when they were merged into CSX Transportation. During the transition into CSX, the company sought to abandon many redundant routes and sell others to shortlines. In 1986, the company announced its intention to abandon more of the remaining Orange Belt line between Tarpon Springs and Clearwater, which had not seen any rail traffic since the early part of the decade. Before the abandonment, the city of Tarpon Springs was granted permission by CSX in 1987 to run six final round-trip passenger runs on the line to Dunedin to commemorate the 100th anniversary of the incorporation of Tarpon Springs as a city, an event which immediately sold out. The tracks were removed immediately afterwards, 99 years after their installation.

== Current conditions ==
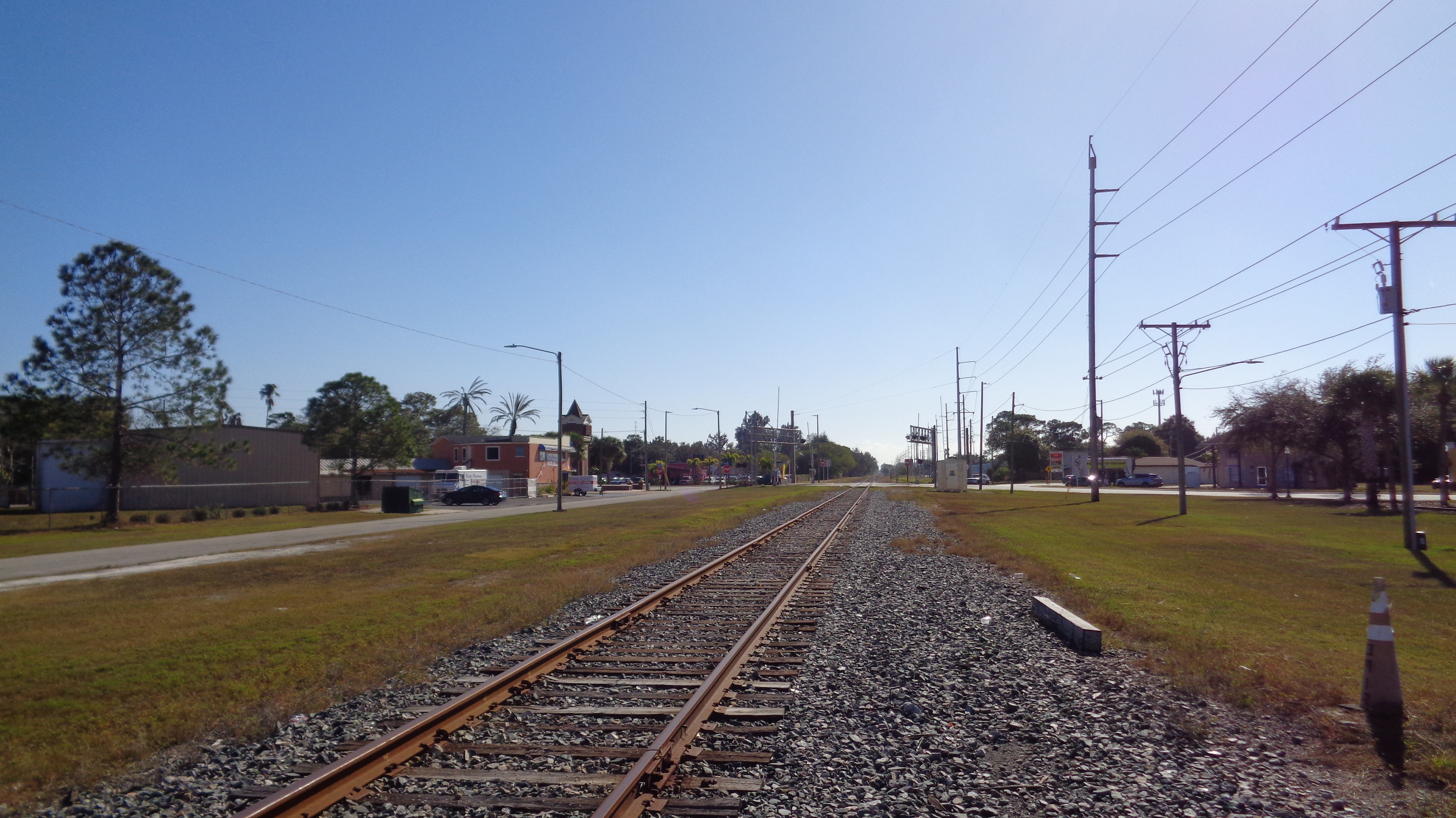
CSX's Clearwater Subdivision in Pinellas Park, Florida along the former right-of-way of the Orange Belt Railway

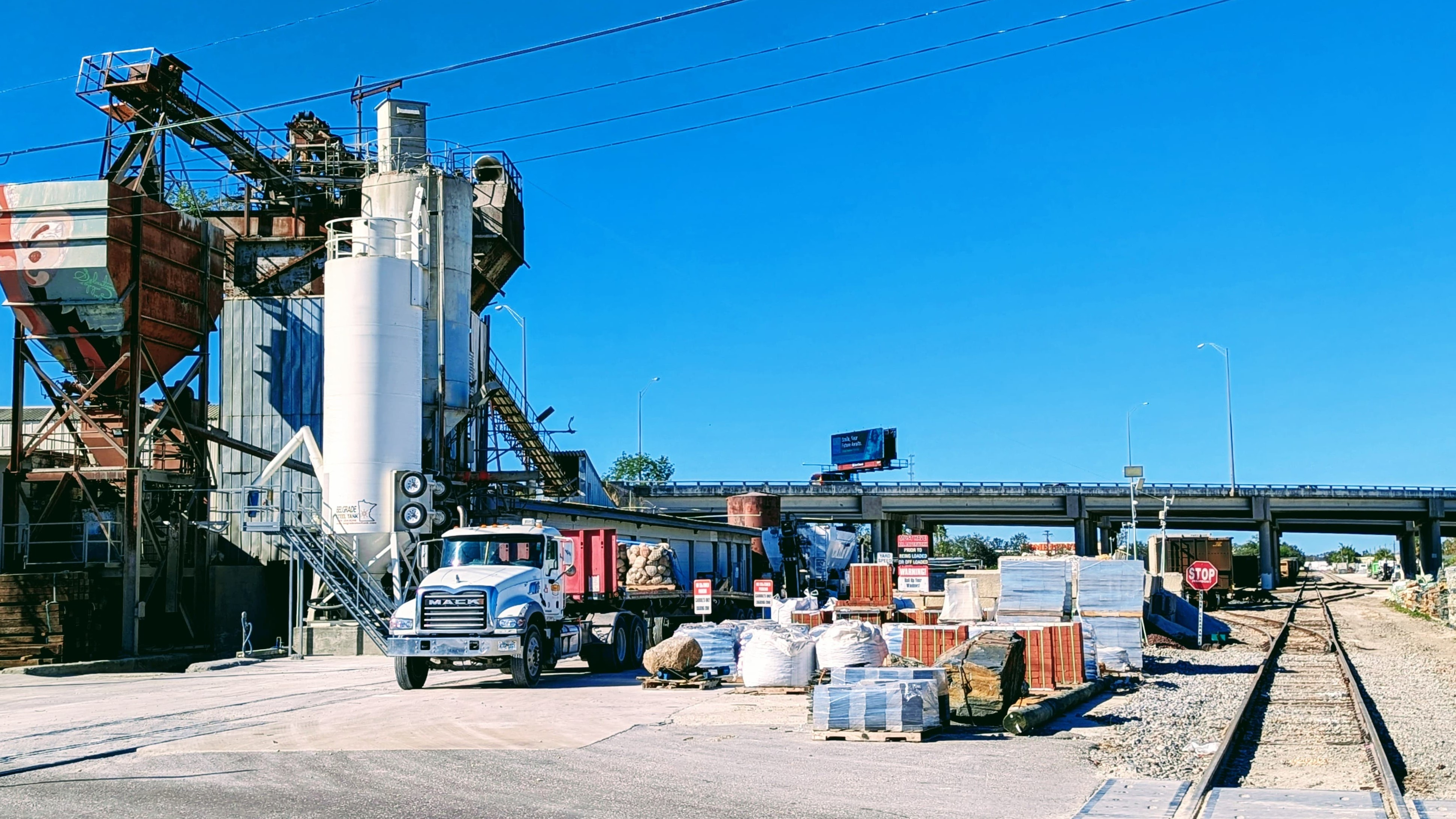
A cement factory in St. Petersburg is currently the southernmost functional railway stop on the line

Today, there are segments of the Orange Belt Railway that are still active. Most notably, a section of the line running from Clearwater southeast to St. Petersburg remains active and is currently part of CSX's Clearwater Subdivision. Additionally, a 3-mile segment of the line in Central Florida from southwest of Forest City to Clarcona is still active, and is operated by the Florida Central Railroad.

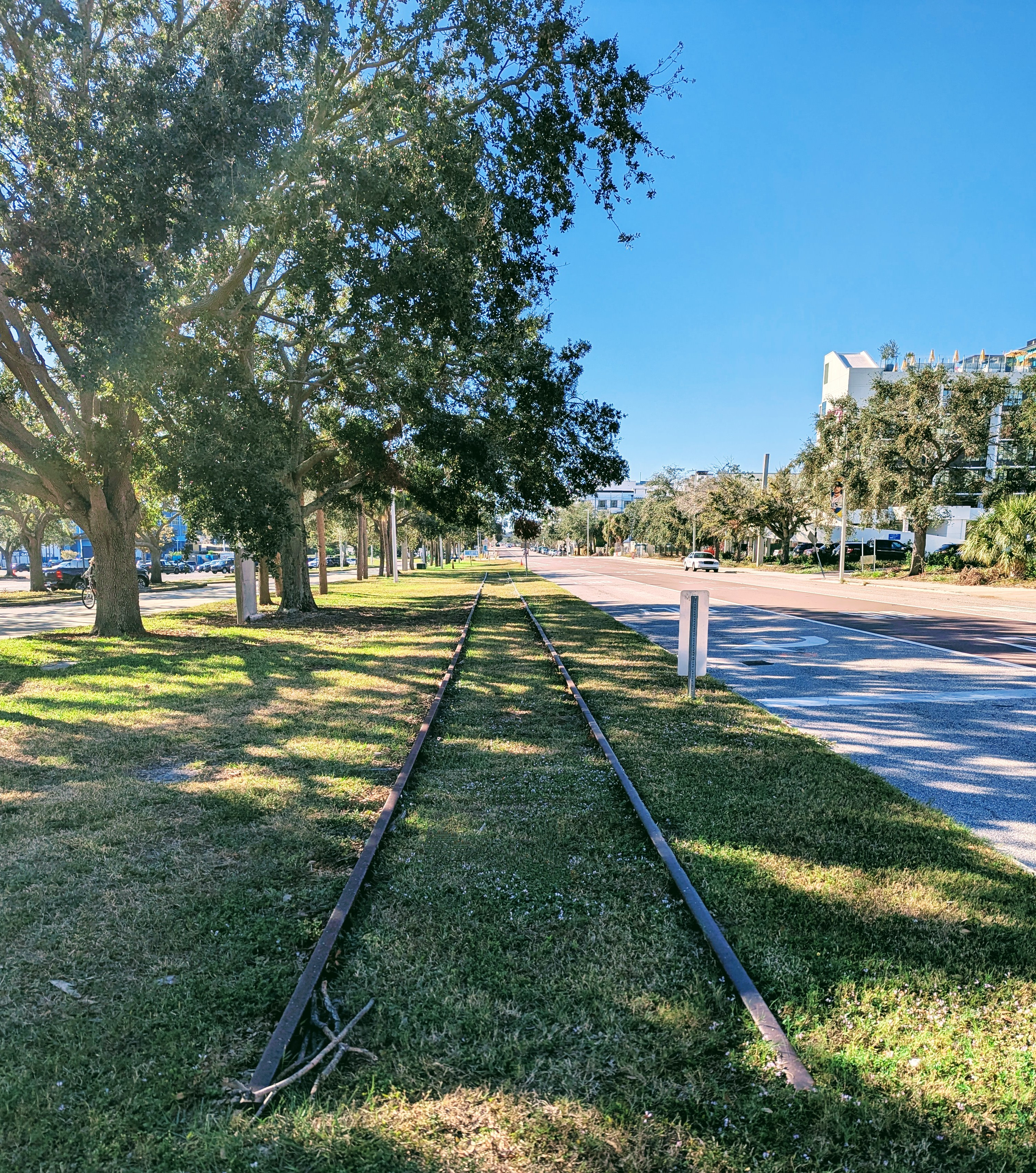
Abandoned section of the Orange Belt Railway near the Gas Plant district of St. Petersburg, Florida.

Many abandoned sections of the rail line have since become rail trails. These include:

- Pinellas Trail
- South Lake-Lake Minneola Scenic Trail
- West Orange Trail
- Seminole-Wekiva Trail

== Historic stations ==
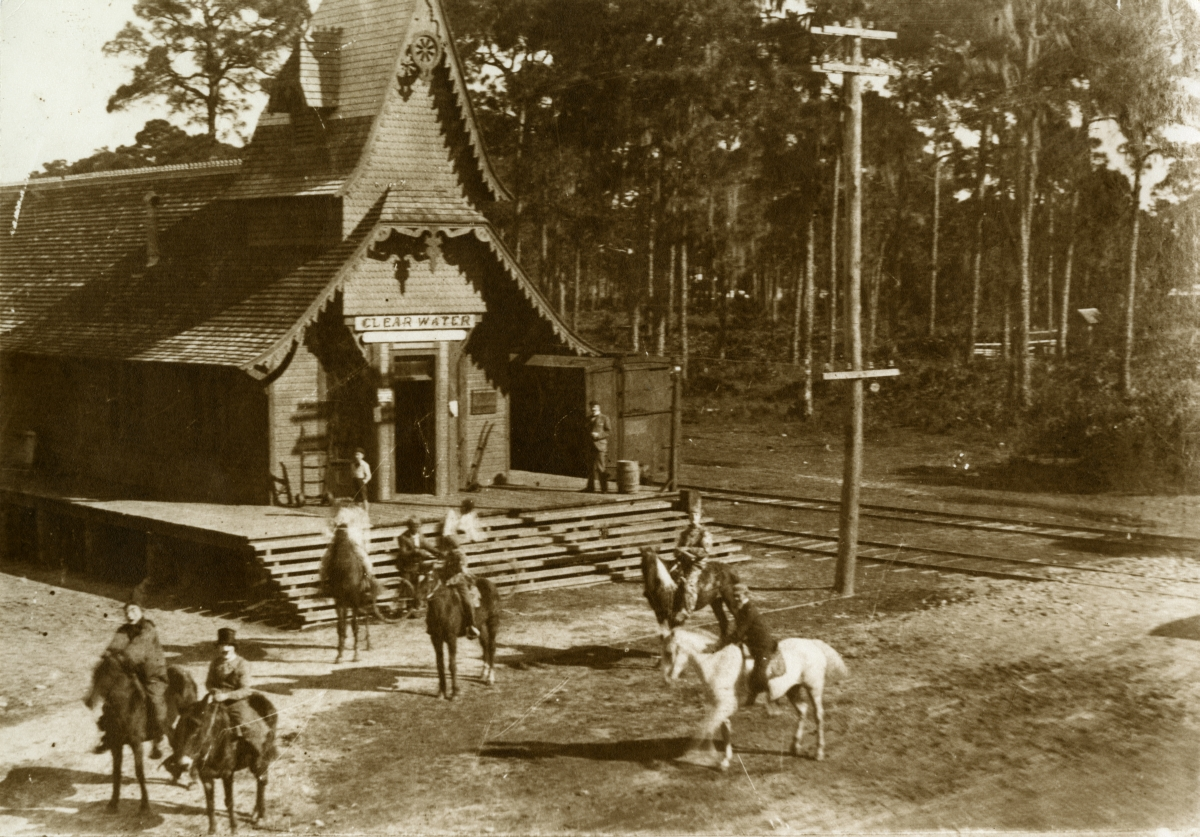
original Clearwater depot

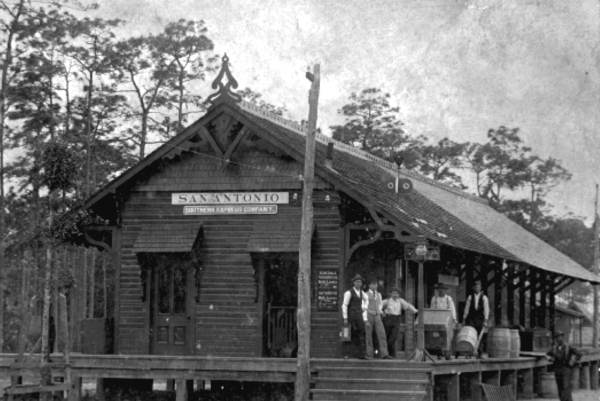
original San Antonio depot

Miles from Sanford	System Milepost	City/Location	Station	Opening date	Connections and notes
0	A 766.3	Sanford	Sanford	1886	junction with Jacksonville, Tampa and Key West Railway (ACL)
0.5			Cedar Avenue	1886	
3.9		Lake Monroe	Monroe	1886	
7.0	AT 773.5		Sylvan Lake	1886	junction with Sanford and Lake Eustis Railway (ACL)
8.0	AT 774.5	Heathrow	Pine Crest	1886	
9.4	AT 775.9	Heathrow	Island Lake	1886	
13.4	AT 779.9		Glen Ethel	1886	
16.0	AT 782.5	Wekiwa Springs	Palm Springs	1886	junction with Florida Midland Railway (ACL)
18.7	AT 785.2	Forest City	Forest City	1886	
21.9	AT 788.7	Lockhart	Toronto	1886	junction with Florida Central and Peninsular Railroad Orlando Division (SAL)
23.2	AT 790.0	Clarcona	Lakeville	1886	
25.0	AT 791.5	Clarcona	Clarcona	1886	junction with Florida Midland Railway (ACL)
27.3	AT 793.8		Millerton	1886	
30.1	AT 796.6		Crown Point	1886	
32.3	AT 798.8	Winter Garden	Winter Garden	1886	
35.1	AT 801.7	Oakland	Oakland	1886	
37.1	AT 803.7	Killarney	Killarney	1888	junction with Tavares and Gulf Railroad (SAL)
39.0	AT 805.6		Cynthiana	1888	
42.7	AT 809.3		Mohawk	1888	
44.1	AT 810.7	Minneola	Minneola	1888	
45.7	AT 812.3	Clermont	Clermont	1888	junction with Tavares and Gulf Railroad (SAL)
52.0	AT 818.3	Groveland	Groveland	1888	
55.0	AT 821.3	Mascotte	Mascotte	1888	
61.0	AT 827.3		Cedar Hammock	1888	
61.7	AT 828.0	Mabel	Mabel	1888	junction with Seaboard Air Line Railroad Miami Subdivision
64.2	AT 830.5	Linden	Linden	1888	
65.4	AT 831.7	Tarrytown	Tarrytown	1888	
69.4	AT 835.7		Riverland	1888	Replaced by Richloam in 1921
69.4	AT 835.7		Richloam	1888	Replaced Riverland in 1921
75.4	AT 841.7	Lacoochee	Lacoochee	1888	junction with Florida Central and Peninsular Railroad Tampa Division (SAL)
76.8	AT 843.1; ARE 823.3	Trilby	Trilby	1888	originally Macon junction with South Florida Railroad Pemberton Ferry Branch (ACL)
79.3	ARE 825.8		Lenard	1888	
81.7	ARE 828.2		Blanton	1888	
83.1	ARE 829.6		Chipco	1888	
87.8	ARE 834.3	San Antonio	San Antonio	1888	
91.5	ARE 838.0		Pasco	1888	
94.7	ARE 841.2		Big Cypress	1888	
100.0	ARE 846.5	Land O' Lakes	Ehren	1888	
102.0	ARE 848.5		Drexel	1888	junction with Tampa Northern Railroad (SAL)
107.3	ARE 853.8		Mexico	1888	
110.3	ARE 856.8	Odessa	Odessa	1888	
114.0	ARE 860.5		Keystone Park	1888	
120.9	ARE 867.4	Tarpon Springs	Tarpon Springs	1888	
125.0	ARE 871.5	Crystal Beach	Crystal Beach	1888	originally Seaside
126.4	ARE 872.9	Palm Harbor	Sutherland	1888	
126.8	ARE 873.3	Palm Harbor	Palm Harbor	1888	
127.1	ARE 873.6	Ozona	Ozona	1888	
131.2	ARE 877.7	Dunedin	Dunedin	1888	
134.4	ARE 880.9	Clearwater	Clearwater	1888	Station Square Park is now located at the site
135.4	ARE 881.9	Belleair	Belleair	1897	served Belleview-Biltmore Hotel junction with Tampa and Gulf Coast Railroad (SAL)
136.8	ARE 883.3		Armour	1888	
138.0	ARE 884.5	Largo	Largo	1888	
142.8	ARE 889.3		Cross Bayou	1888	
144.5	ARE 891.0	Pinellas Park	Pinellas Park	1900s	built in the 1900s during the ACL era depot demolished in 1970
146.9	ARE 893.4	Lealman	Lealman	1888	
152.8	ARE 899.3	St. Petersburg	St. Petersburg	1888	connections with steamships junction with Tampa and Gulf Coast Railroad (SAL)
