= Orange Belt =

Orange Belt may refer to the following:

- A level in the Japanese system of classification known as Kyū.
- The second outermost road in the Allegheny County belt system.
- Orange Belt Railway in Florida
