= Lake Monroe =

Lake Monroe may refer to one of the following places in the United States:

- Lake Monroe, Florida, unincorporated community
- Lake Monroe (Florida) in Florida, a lake on the St. Johns River
- Lake Monroe (Mississippi) in Monroe County, Mississippi
- Monroe Lake in Monroe and Brown counties, Indiana
