= Zellwood, Florida =

Unincorporated area in Florida, US

- Census-designated place
- Location in Orange County and the state of Florida
- Coordinates: 28°44′17″N 81°36′14″W
- Country: United States
- State: Florida
- County: Orange

Area
  - Total: 3.93 sq mi (10.17 km^{2})
  - Land: 3.76 sq mi (9.74 km^{2})
  - Water: 0.16 sq mi (0.42 km^{2})
- Elevation: 108 ft (33 m)

Population (2020)
  - Total: 2,758
  - Density: 733.1/sq mi (283.04/km^{2})
- Time zone: UTC-5 (Eastern (EST))
  - Summer (DST): UTC-4 (EDT)
- ZIP code: 32798
- Area codes: 407, 689
- FIPS code: 12-79200
- GNIS feature ID: 2403049

Zellwood is a census-designated place and a water control district in Orange County, Florida, United States. The population was 2,758 as of 2020. It is part of the Orlando–Kissimmee Metropolitan Statistical Area.

== History ==
=== 19th century to World War 2: T. Ellwood Zell ===
Zellwood is named after T. Ellwood Zell, who started spending winters in the area in 1876. The Zellwood Post Office opened in 1877.

An 1881 prospectus issued by the Orange County Immigration Society advertised that "[w]e have a school, post office, and a rapidly increasing population" and that the "enlargement of the channels connecting Lakes Dora, Beauclair and Apopka" would "give us water transportation within three miles". A similar 1883 prospectus issued by the county commissioners promised that the Tavares, Orlando & Atlantic Railroad (TO&AR) was planned to pass through Zellwood, spoke of "adaptability for growing oranges, lemons, lines, etc"., and advertised land for sale in 5-or-10-acre (2.0 or 4.0 ha) lots.

Edith Fairfax Davenport's family built a home in Zellwood in 1885, and several of her paintings still reside in the Zellwood Historical Society Museum in the 21st century, including a full-size replica of James McNeill Whistler's portrait of his mother, although she herself moved to Winter Park in 1955.

The James Laughlin House, known as Sydonie, was built in Zellwood in 1895 by steel heir James Laughlin Jr.

But by 1940 the over-winter permanent population of the area was still just a few hundred people.

=== Middle to late 20th century: Boom and bust of corn ===
Zellwood was established legally as the Zellwood Drainage and Water Control District by act of the Florida state legislature in 1941. (Note: Chapter 20714, Laws of Florida) This was to enable marshland in the area to the north of Lake Apopka to be drained and used for agriculture. Several prior unsuccessful efforts to do this had been made, including one in the late 1800s and one in 1915. The lack of drainage meant that the low-level farmland was subject to flooding, resulting in what were termed "suitcase farmers", a succession of farmers who arrived, attempted to grow vegetables, failed, and left.

The World War 2 attempt had more success, and by 1947 there were 1,162 hectares (2,870 acres) in row crops with a further 1,974 hectares (4,880 acres) being prepared. The Apopka-Beauclair Canal, dating from the aforementioned 1800s, was dredged deeper in 1958. In all, some 20,000 acres (8,100 ha) of so-called "muck land" (soil heavy with peat and other organic deposits) were exposed.

Land at Zellwood was bought by the National Ramie Corporation, the Duda family (which also owned some 9,000 acres (3,600 ha) outside of Zellwood), and Richard Whitney and by 1950 newspapers were hailing a "wealthy new frontier of truck crop production". In 1967, sweetcorn producers banded together as the Zellwood Sweet Corn Exchange, a sales coöperative. By 1977, Zellwood was producing 20% of all the sweetcorn produced in Florida, as well as leaf crops, radishes, carrots, celery, beans, cauliflower, cabbage, eggplant, cucumbers, artichokes, beetroot, and watermelon. Roughly 20 producers were growing sweetcorn over 10,500 acres (4,200 ha), selling between 2.5 and 3 million crates mostly during a 5-to-6-week period in the Spring. By the 1980s, there was a Zellwood Sweet Corn Festival and famers in Florida were selling 11.5 million crates in up to three harvests per annum, to a value of approximately US$71,400,000 (equivalent to about $185,400,000 in 2025). At the peak of the boom, there were 35 large and small farms in the area. Ralston Purina was growing mushrooms in a huge complex nearby.

The Zellwood Sweet Corn Festival was organized by the North West Orange County Improvement Association (NWOCIA), and held the weekend after the May corn harvests. It had begun as a community corn boil fundraiser in 1968, renamed to the Zellwood Sweet Corn Festival in 1973 and hosted initially at Zellwood Station and then in the NWOCIA's own building on Ponkan Road in Zellwood. Its signature "Big Bertha" corn cooker (Note: A replacement "Big Bertha II" was built in 1993, although sometimes both were on display at the festival.) was designed by a local plumber, Bob Harper of Orlando, and built in Texas.

Farmers began using pesticides such as DDT as early as 1947, when there was an infestation of corn earworms. After DDT was banned in 1972, farmers switched to other organochloride pesticides, which themselves were later banned in the 1970s and 1980s. Outside of the growing season, farmers flooded their lands with lakewater to control pests and to ensure that the soil was not oxygenated. When growing season commenced, they would pump the water back into the lake, which would transport the fertilizers and pesticides that they had sprayed from the last season into the lake. Some 20,000,000,000 US gallons (76 Gl) of polluted water, roughly one third of the lake's capacity, was discharged by farms into the lake.

This had devastating effects both on wildlife and on people. Fish and native plant populations in the lake died, alligators were born deformed because of endocrine disruption, algae bloomed, and workers became ill. The alligator population shrank over the course of the 1980s from between 1,200 and 2,000 alligators per night observed by research biologists from the University of Florida to just 150 per night. Even the lake itself shrank, going from the second largest in Florida to the fourth as muck and silt built up on the lakebed.

The lake, which had had a reputation as one of the best fishing lakes in the United States back in the 1950s, no longer supported recreational fishing at all. In 1951 there had been 13 fish camps on the southern edge of the lake, where 10,000 bass had been caught that year (according to newspaper reports). In 1981 they were all closed.

In 1996, the state of Florida began a programme of purchasing the mucklands farms and shutting them down. The St John's River Water Management District and the United States Department of Agriculture together purchased almost all of them in the period from 1998 to 2001, with physical reclamation of the land beginning in 1998. This displaced some 2,500 mostly African American farmworkers.

African Americans had been working the farms ever since the 1940s; sometimes involuntarily. Apopka had passed two laws that affected African American residents: the first in 1937 a Jim Crow law (Note: This law was finally abolished in 1968 under the mayorship of Leonard Hearst.) that prevented African Americans living or running businesses north of the TO&AR railway tracks, and the second in 1941 an anti-vagrancy law that prohibited males 18 or older from loitering. As the Masonic hall on the corner of Central Avenue and Ninth Street in Apopka was a favourite hangout for the African American community at the time, it was a regular occurrence initially for the local sheriff to pull up and offer "vagrants" the choice of joining the Army (Note: Sheriff Fred Wiesner could simply contact the Selective Service Board.), going to jail, or working on the muck farms.

These workers had been exposed long-term to the pesticides, both directly as they worked in the farms when planes sprayed overhead and indirectly as their diet comprised locally produced food, with little recourse. Oral accounts reported that workers were sprayed sometimes three times per week. Agricultural workers were not unionized, Florida having been a right to work state since 1944, and in the initial decades pesticide use was almost wholly unregulated. Little was also known at the time about long-term exposure effects of pesticides.

Although regulations were later brought in, they were difficult to put into practice. Most agricultural workers lived in unregulated housing on the farms; a 1971 legislative committee report estimating 22,276 out-of-state workers living in non-permitted labour camps in Florida. Florida lacked the funds and the manpower to inspect these camps, and ensure that they complied with the then existing health and sanitation regulations, and records show that out of 407 such camps in Florida as a whole, only 259 had permits. Many labourers were invisible to even local town residents, as they lived in isolated employer-owned camps next to the fields, that would also be exposed to the pesticide spraying which would drift over them from the fields. Although there were regulations about the minimum time that must pass before workers could reenter fields after spraying, the fact that their homes were also affected meant that these had little effect in practice.

The unemployed farmworkers fared badly. They initially receiving no money at all, from when the state auctioned off the purchased farm tools and equipment; after lobbying from the Farm Worker Association of Florida some money was allocated towards community centres and retraining, although many of the permanent resident workers who lived in nearby Apopka were elderly and physically unfit for what alternative work was offered to them. (Other, migrant and primarily Hispanic, workers had returned to Florida the next season to simply find no farm jobs and had switched to working in the construction and landscaping industries that had been booming in the late 1990s.) No health studies were performed on the long term impacts of the pesticides on these residents, and over the course of the subsequent decade many simply died. After grass-roots lobbying by the farmworkers themselves, including two commemorative quilts and protests outside of environmental and legislative meetings, the state legislature allocated US$500,000 (equivalent to $715,607 in 2025) for the "farm-worker clinic" in Apopka in a budget item sponsored by Gary Siplin, which was vetoed by Rick Scott, twice: in both 2011 and 2012.

=== 21st century: Zellwood Corn now in Mount Dora ===
Sweet corn from Zellwood is now consigned to history, the Zellwood Sweet Corn Festival, which was still held every year until 2013, having switched to entirely out-of-Zellwood produce grown on sand farms rather than the Zellwood mucklands in 1998. Even so, by 2017, only one such sand farm (located in Mount Dora rather than in Zellwood) was left growing Zellwood-branded corn, a brand that it had adopted in 2001, selling the now comparatively expensive to produce corn as a luxury corn brand to restaurants rather than retail outlets. The brand owners, Long and Scott Farms, had hosted the Zellwood Sweet Corn Festival until 2013. It had had various hiatuses up to that point, with both Big Berthas on display in 2011 but not operational, and the festival not held at all in 2009. A replacement Mount Dora Corn Festival was begun in 2024.

The commemorative quilts were the Lake Apopka Farmworker Memorial Quilt Project, two hand-sewn quilts made by members of the erstwhile African American farmworker community. Each quilt panel memorialized someone who had died working on the farm, sometimes representing them at work but othertimes representing them doing what they enjoyed in life, such as fishing, cooking, or reading. In 2012 they went on tour around various workshops and conferences on environmental justice.

== Geography ==
According to the United States Census Bureau, the CDP has a total area of 10.5 km^{2} (4.1 mi^{2}), of which 10.1 km^{2} (3.9 mi^{2}) is land and 0.5 km^{2} (0.2 mi^{2}) (4.42%) is water.

== Demographics ==
Historical population
Census	Pop.	Note	%±
2020	2,758		—
U.S. Decennial Census

=== 2020 census ===
As of the 2020 census, Zellwood had a population of 2,758. The median age was 67.1 years. 8.7% of residents were under the age of 18 and 55.5% of residents were 65 years of age or older. For every 100 females there were 86.5 males, and for every 100 females age 18 and over there were 82.9 males age 18 and over.

95.6% of residents lived in urban areas, while 4.4% lived in rural areas.

There were 1,432 households in Zellwood, of which 9.5% had children under the age of 18 living in them. Of all households, 46.6% were married-couple households, 15.9% were households with a male householder and no spouse or partner present, and 32.1% were households with a female householder and no spouse or partner present. About 38.1% of all households were made up of individuals and 30.0% had someone living alone who was 65 years of age or older.

There were 1,588 housing units, of which 9.8% were vacant. The homeowner vacancy rate was 3.6% and the rental vacancy rate was 6.6%.

Racial composition as of the 2020 census
Race	Number	Percent
White	2,201	79.8%
Black or African American	85	3.1%
American Indian and Alaska Native	19	0.7%
Asian	33	1.2%
Native Hawaiian and Other Pacific Islander	1	0.0%
Some other race	181	6.6%
Two or more races	238	8.6%
Hispanic or Latino (of any race)	456	16.5%

=== 2000 census ===
As of the census of 2000, there were 2,540 people, 1,239 households, and 795 families residing in the CDP. The population density was 252.1/km^{2} (653.3/mi^{2}). There were 1,409 housing units at an average density of 139.9/km^{2} (362.4/mi^{2}). The racial makeup of the CDP was 93.62% White, 2.83% African American, 0.31% Native American, 0.04% Asian, 2.09% from other races, and 1.10% from two or more races. Hispanic or Latino of any race were 9.09% of the population.

There were 1,239 households, out of which 9.5% had children under the age of 18 living with them, 55.8% were married couples living together, 5.6% had a female householder with no husband present, and 35.8% were non-families. 32.1% of all households were made up of individuals, and 23.8% had someone living alone who was 65 years of age or older. The average household size was 2.00 and the average family size was 2.43.

In the CDP, the population was spread out, with 11.1% under the age of 18, 3.8% from 18 to 24, 15.4% from 25 to 44, 21.0% from 45 to 64, and 48.7% who were 65 years of age or older. The median age was 64 years. For every 100 females, there were 86.5 males. For every 100 females age 18 and over, there were 84.6 males.

The median income for a household in the CDP was $29,300, and the median income for a family was $34,468. Males had a median income of $24,091 versus $20,378 for females. The per capita income for the CDP was $22,683. About 6.6% of families and 11.9% of the population were below the poverty line, including 23.8% of those under age 18 and 4.2% of those age 65 or over.
