= Florida Midland Railway =

Historic railroad in Florida

- Original Route (click to enlarge)

Overview
- Locale: Central Florida
- Successor: Plant System; Atlantic Coast Line Railroad; Seaboard Coast Line Railroad

The Florida Midland Railway Company was incorporated under the general incorporation laws of Florida, and surveyed a line from Lake Jessup, in Orange County, to Leesburg, in Lake County.

== History ==
The company was reincorporated on February 10, 1885; only 10 miles (16 km) had been graded. The new owners were E. W. Henck, S. M. Breuster, Carl Cushing, A. Menser and C. E. Munson of Florida, and Edward Page, Charles W. Morris and Cyrus Carpenter of Boston, Massachusetts.

The line was extended

... beginning at a point on the Indian River and running through the counties of Brevard and Orange to Leesburg, in Sumter county, or to Eustis, in Orange county, or to points or a point of connection with railroads or a railroad running from these places, or from either of them, and from a point on the line of said road, in Orange county, to a point on the Gulf of Mexico, running through the counties of Orange, Sumter, Polk, Hernando, Hillsborough, Manatee and Monroe, or such of them as may be necessary to reach the terminal point, which shall be selected on the Gulf of Mexico.

— Florida state law chapter 3652, approved February 10, 1885, source unknown

Land grants were promised, as long as part of the railroad was completed within a year.

Florida state law chapter 3795, approved June 2, 1887, expanded the area from which land grants could be chosen, and extended the deadline to June 1, 1888.

The line actually built was rather different, running from Clifton on Lake Jesup west to Apopka, but then turning south to Kissimmee.

The railroad's track was 4 ft 8 1/2 in (1,435 mm) standard gauge while it was independent, but when it was taken over by the Plant System in the late 1890s, all track north of the 3 ft (914 mm) narrow gauge section of the Sanford and St. Petersburg Railroad (also taken over by the Plant System) was abandoned and the remaining trackage from Clarcona to Kissimmee was converted to 3 ft narrow gauge. The two narrow gauge lines were run in conjunction with one another, allowing the usage of the same narrow gauge equipment on both lines. The Plant System became part of the Atlantic Coast Line Railroad system in 1902.

== Current conditions ==
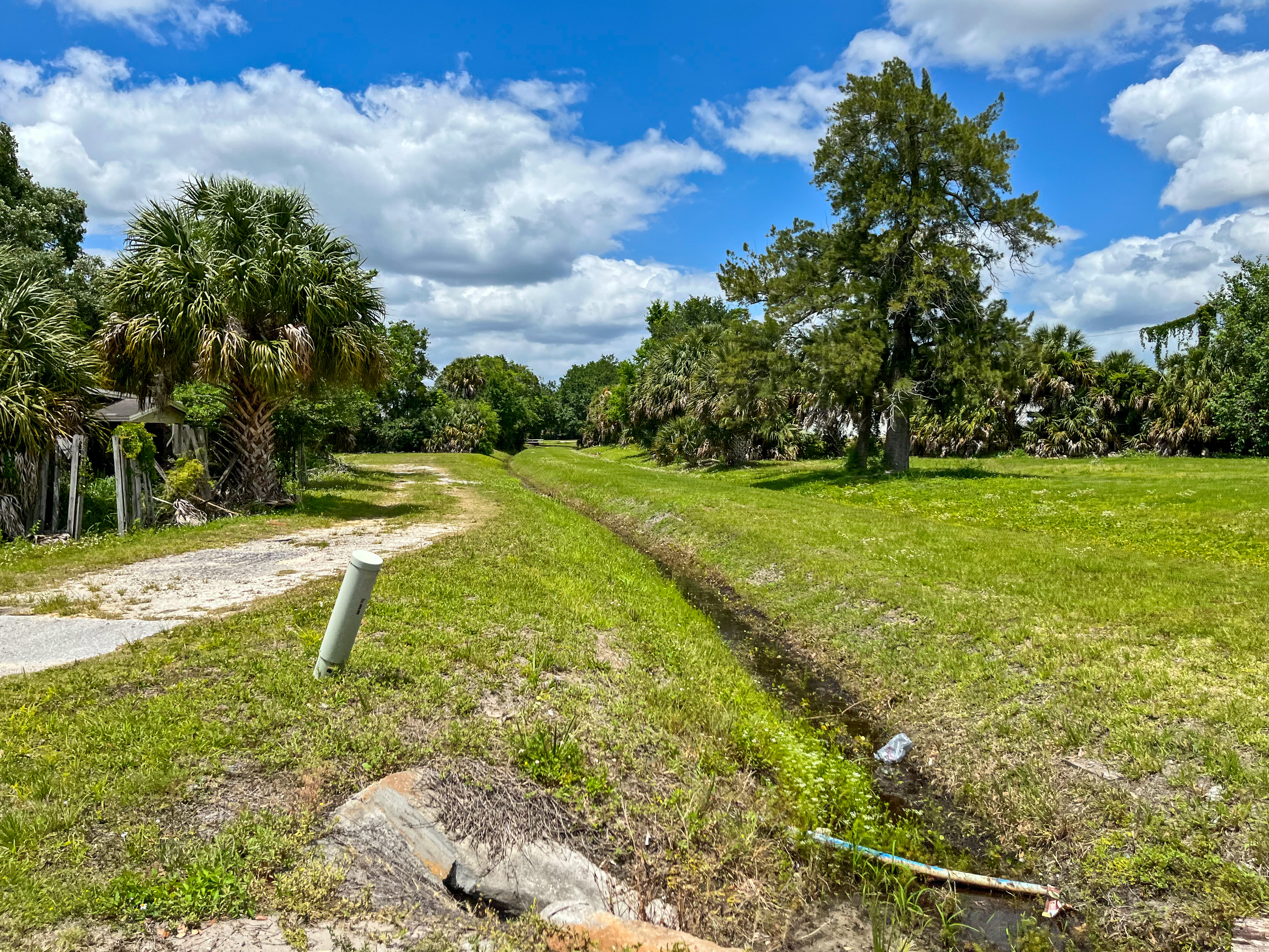
Abandoned Florida Midland RR Right of way in Ocoee Florida

From Clifton to Apopka, the railroad has been abandoned for over 100 years. Virtually no trace of this section remains, but parts of the right-of-way were used to construct SR 434.

From Apopka to Clarcona, the right-of-way is used for the West Orange Trail.

From Clarcona to Ocoee, the right-of-way is currently owned by CSX Transportation and run by the Florida Central Railroad.

From Ocoee to Kissimmee, the railroad is abandoned, and some elements remain.

== Historic stations ==
These are listed from north to south.

Milepost	City/Location	Station	Connections and notes
		Clifton	junction with Sanford and Indian River Railroad (ACL)
	Longwood	Longwood	junction with South Florida Railroad (ACL)
		Palm Springs	junction with Orange Belt Railway (ACL)
	Altamonte Springs	Altamonte	
		Lake Brantley	
		Fitzville	
	Apopka	East Apopka	junction with Apopka and Clay Spring Railway
AVB 841.1	Apopka	Apopka	junction with Florida Central and Peninsular Railroad Orlando Division (SAL)
AVB 837.5	Clarcona	Clarcona	junction with Orange Belt Railway (ACL)
		Villa Nova	
AVB 832.6	Ocoee	Ocoee	junction with Tavares & Gulf Railroad (SAL)
	Ocoee	Minorville	
AVB 829.1	Gotha	Gotha	
AVB 825.7	Windermere	Windermere	
AVB 822.0	Doctor Phillips	Doctor Phillips	previously known as Harperville
AVB 818.5	Vineland	Vineland	previously known as Orange Center, also Englewood
		Molanes	
AVB 812.3		Shingle Creek	
AVB 808.0	Kissimmee	Kissimmee	junction with South Florida Railroad (ACL)

== See also ==
- List of Atlantic Coast Line Railroad precursors
