= Arthur Bullard Newton =

American politician and businessman

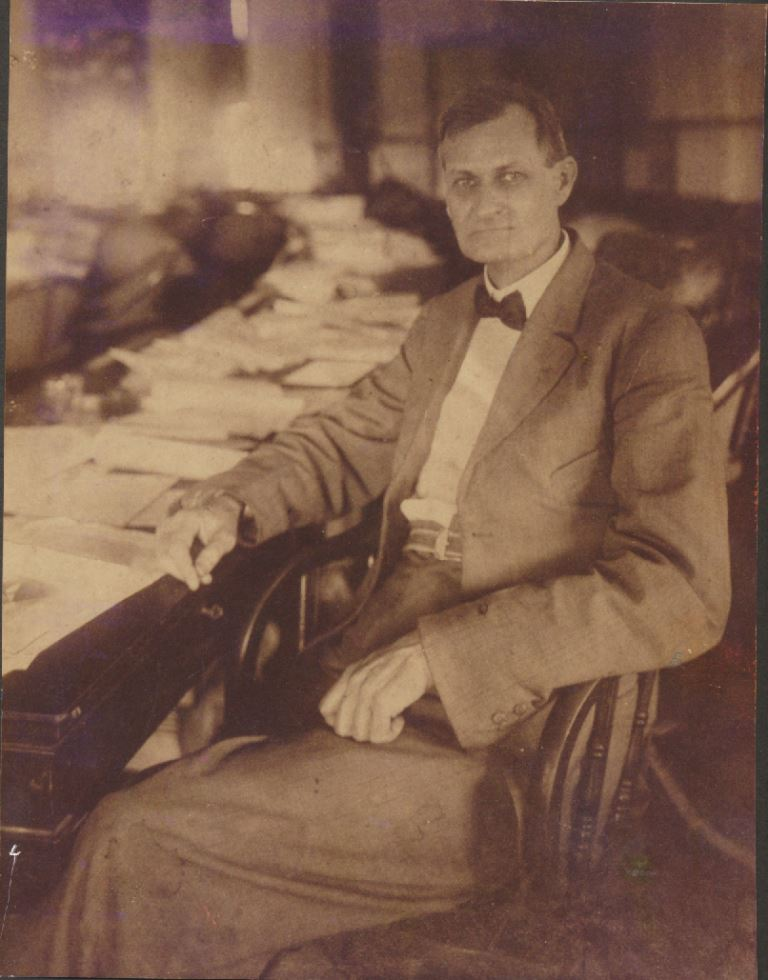

Member of the Florida State House of Representatives from Orange County
- In office 1909-1911, 1915-1917, 1921-1923

Mayor of Winter Garden
- In office 1908-?

Personal details
- Born: July 28, 1864 Cardsville, Mississippi
- Died: September 9, 1940 Winter Garden, Florida
- Party: Democratic Party

Arthur Bullard Newton, better known as A. B. Newton, was a pioneer, businessman, and politician who significantly shaped Winter Garden, Florida, in west Orange County, Florida. His notable contributions include: opening the first store in Winter Garden, serving as the first Winter Garden Mayor, founding the first local newspaper in Winter Garden, among other things.

== Early life ==
Arthur Bullard Newton was born on July 28, 1864, in Cardsville, Mississippi. He spent his childhood and eventually married his first wife, Minnie, there. However, in 1892 Newton packed everything up and set out for Florida. He arrived in Winter Garden ready to make a living for himself and his family. In 1893, Minnie died in childbirth.

== Life in Florida ==
Upon his arrival, one of the first things he set out to do was open a general store. His store was the first in the town, and he soon earned a reputation as a fine merchant. But it was just one of his multiple enterprises. He also started a newspaper titled "The Ricochet" the first in Winter Garden. Additionally, he worked at the First National Bank of Winter Garden upon its opening, along with a variety of other enterprises. Before too long, he married again, this time to a woman named Alice with whom he had seven children, five of which died in infancy.

Newton's reputation earned him a seat as one of the Florida electors of the Electoral College in the Presidential Election of 1904. When the city of Winter Garden incorporated in 1908, voters chose A. B. Newton as the first mayor. Soon after, his ambition extended to the state government when he won a seat in the Florida State House of Representatives in the Election of 1908. In Tallahassee he introduced the bill which legally confirmed the incorporation of Winter Garden. He repeated his victory in the 1914 and 1920 elections. Afterwards, Newton continued to participate in Florida Democratic Party politics but never again acceded to statewide office.

== Legacy ==
Today, Newton is well remembered by the residents of Winter Garden. He has been given the nicknames of "Mr. First" (on account of him being the first to hold many positions in Winter Garden) and "The Godfather of Winter Garden." A local online retailer inspired by Newton named their company after him, while Newton Park on the shore of Lake Apopka was named in his honor.
