= Osborn Airfield =

Airport in Florida, U.S.

- IATA: none; ICAO: none; FAA LID: 02FA

Summary
- Airport type: Private
- Owner/Operator: Jon & Darlene Osborn
- Serves: Groveland, Florida
- Location: Groveland, Florida
- Elevation AMSL: 121 ft / 37 m
- Coordinates: 28°31.6′N 81°52.5′W
- Website: http://www.osbornairfield.com/
- Interactive map of Osborn Airfield

Runways
Direction	Length		Surface
Direction	ft	m	Surface
18/36	3,700	1,128	Grass

Osborn Airfield (FAA LID: 02FA) is a private airport located 3 miles southwest of Groveland, Florida.

== History ==
The airport was formerly known as Klinger Airport. Jon and Darlene Osborn, the current owners of the airfield, bought Klinger in 2004 and gave it its present name.

According to the airport's official website, the airport facilities are expanding and will soon include 28 new hangars in addition to the four hangars and 18 tie-downs already present. Although the airfield is private, it is open to the public for fly-ins.

== Facilities and aircraft ==
Osborn Airfield has one runway. It is designated as Runway 18/36, measures 3585 x 150 feet (1093 x 46 m), and is turf.

== See also ==
- List of airports in Florida
