= Magnolia Park (Apopka, Florida) =

- Type: Regional park
- Location: Orange County, Florida, United States
- Nearest city: Apopka, Florida
- Coordinates: 28°38′03″N 81°33′00″W
- Area: 56 acres (0.23 km^{2})
- Created: 1962; 63 years ago
- Operated by: Orange County Parks and Recreation
- Open: Summer: 8:00am - 8:00pm, Winter: 8:00am - 6:00pm
- Website: orangecountyfl.net

Magnolia Park is a county park located on the eastern shore of Lake Apopka. It is managed by the Orange County Parks and Recreation.

== History ==
The land for Magnolia Park was deeded to Orange County in 1962.

== Recreation ==
Magnolia Park contains picnic tables, playgrounds, volleyball courts, basketball courts, baseball fields, a boat ramp, 18 RV/tent campsites, and 2 group campsites. A trailhead for the Lake Apopka Loop Trail is located on the northwest side of the park.

== Wildlife ==
Magnolia Park is home to about a dozen peacocks, which have been known to be aggressive at times. Sandhill Cranes, Osprey, Turkey Vultures, American Alligators, and numerous other animals are also regularly spotted at the park.

== Access and hours of operation ==
Magnolia Park is located at 2929 S Binion RD, Apopka, FL 32703. It is open daily, from 8:00am – 8:00pm in the summer, and 8:00am – 6:00pm in the winter.
