= Clay Springs and Apopka Railroad =

Railroad in Florida, United States

The Clay Springs and Apopka Railroad ran from the Florida Central and Peninsular Railroad's Orlando Division southeast of Apopka, north and northeast across the Florida Midland Railroad at East Apopka, to Clay Springs (now Wekiwa Springs), Florida, United States. It was operational from around 1890 to sometime after 1919. If it had not already been shut down, the paving of Wekiwa Springs Road (Orange County Bond Project 44) in the late 1920s spelled the demise of the railroad.
