= Tavares, Orlando and Atlantic Railroad =

The Tavares, Orlando and Atlantic Railroad Company was incorporated by Florida state law chapter 3499, approved March 5, 1883, as owned by Alexander St. Clair-Abrams of New Orleans, W. R. Anno, Nat Poyntz and J. L. Bryan of Orange County, Florida; L. H. Davis of New Jersey; John P. Morton of Kentucky; and Charles Jay of Vermont.

The line was defined as beginning at Tavares, in Lake County, running thence to Orlando in Orange County, passing through or near Apopka City, thence to such point on the Atlantic coast as the said company by its President and Board of Directors may determine, together with a branch from or near Apopka City, to or near Oakland, on the south side of Lake Apopka.

The railroad was promised land grants along its line.

== See also ==
- West Orange Trail for a trail partly on the former railroad right-of-way.
