= Green Mountain Scenic Overlook and Trailhead (Lake County, Florida) =

Park in Florida, United States

- Location within Florida
- Type: Regional park
- Location: Lake County, Florida, United States
- Nearest city: Clermont, Florida
- Coordinates: 28°38′49″N 81°42′35″W
- Created: 2014
- Operator: Lake County, Florida
- Open: Summer: 7:00am – Dusk
- Website: lakecountyfl.gov

Green Mountain Scenic Overlook and Trailhead is a small county park located a short distance west of Lake Apopka. It is managed by Lake County.

== History ==
The land for the Green Mountain Scenic Overlook and Trailhead was leased to Lake County from the St. Johns River Water Management District. The overlook opened in October 2014, and connected to the Lake Apopka Loop Trail in 2015.

== Recreation ==
The park contains a pavilion, educational kiosks, 0.4 miles (0.64 km) of winding trail down to the trailhead for the Lake Apopka Loop Trail, and an observation tower 132 feet (40 m) above sea level that provides views of Lake Apopka and the Orlando skyline.

== Wildlife ==
At least 135 species of birds and nearly 20 species of butterflies have been seen at the overlook.

== Access and hours of operation ==
Green Mountain Scenic Overlook and Trailhead is located at 20700 County Road 455, Montverde, Florida 34715. It is open daily, from 7:00am – Dusk.
