= Richloam General Store and Post Office =

- U.S. National Register of Historic Places
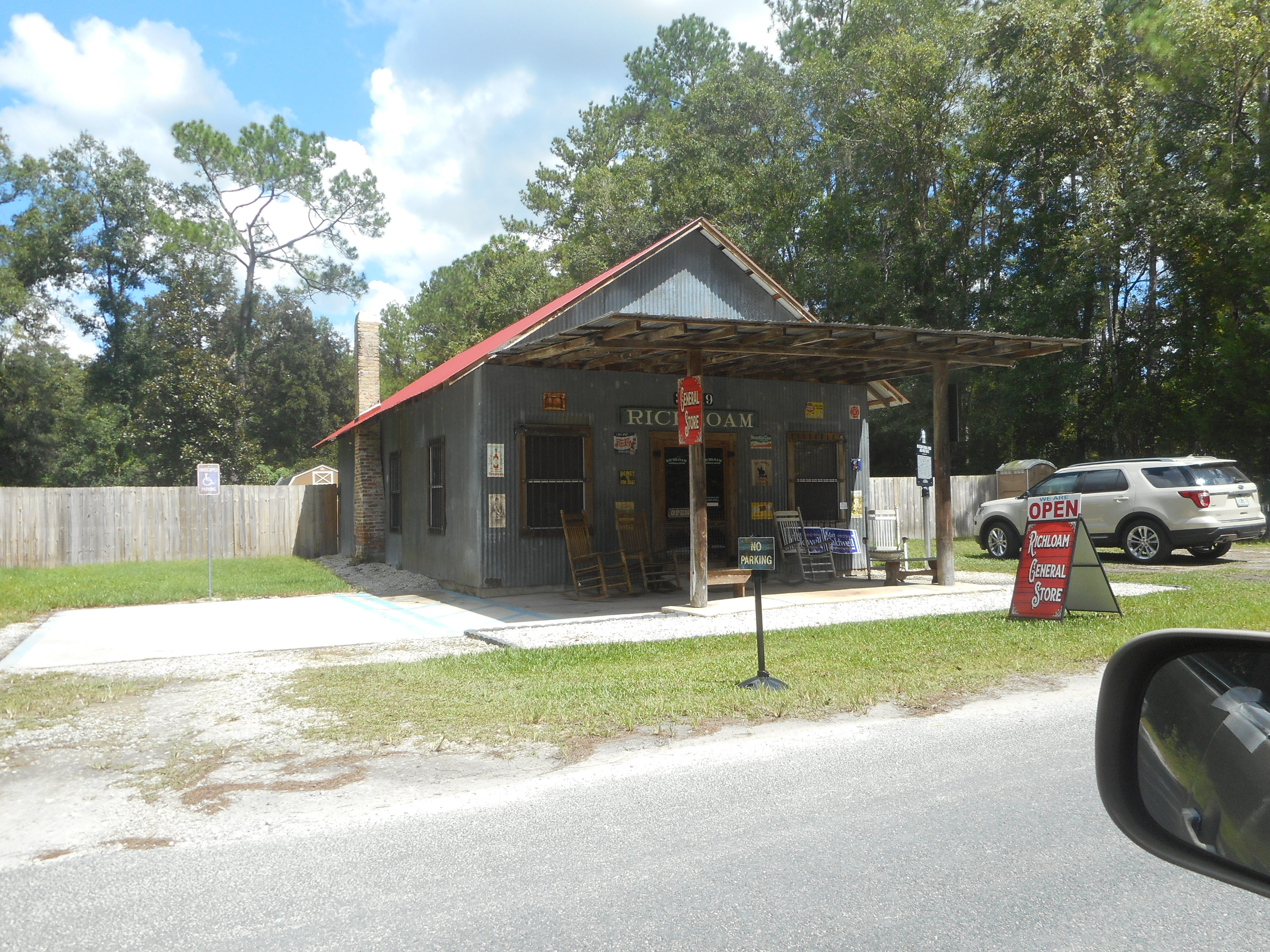
- The general store as seen from a car in September 2018

- Location within Florida Location within the United States
- Location: 38219 Richloam-Clay Sink Road; Richloam, Florida
- Coordinates: 28°30′5.21″N 82°6′48.04″W
- NRHP reference No.: 100001734
- Added to NRHP: October 12, 2017

The Richloam General Store and Post Office, is a general store as well as a former post office and railroad station located within the Withlacoochee State Forest in the former community of Richloam, Florida. It is located on Richloam-Clay Sink Road near the corner of Riverland Road next door to the former right-of-way of the Orange Belt Railway. Though the store is addressed as being in Webster, Florida, it is actually approximately midway between Ridge Manor and Tarrytown, Florida.

== History ==
In the late-19th Century, the Orange Belt Railway ran through eastern Hernando County, and was acquired by the Atlantic Coast Line Railroad in 1902. As with many rural communities in Florida, lumber mills were established along the line, prior to acquisition.

In 1921, the regional head of the ACL, moved the station southwest of Riverland to the community of Richloam. Postmaster Sidney Brinson moved the Riverland Post Office to Richloam in 1922, and a general store would soon follow. From that point on, the community resembled that of the Wild West. Chief among these instances was a gunfight over a dog that lead to the shooting of a Pasco County Deputy Sheriff. The store was rebuilt after a 1928 robbery and fire, but devastated by the Great Depression.

Richloam, Richland, and other nearby communities were acquired by the United States Land Resettlement Administration in 1936, and was placed under control of the United States Forest Service. The store was used as a rental house until the 1950s. The United States Forest Service turned the land over to the Florida Board of Forestry who in turn converted it into a tract of the Withlacoochee State Forest in 1958. The former Orange Belt Railway Line was merged into the Seaboard Coast Line Railroad along with the rest of ACL in 1967. An ancestor of Sid named John Brinson reacquired the property in 1973 after the store sat vacant since the 1950s. Despite the fact that Seaboard Coast Line began to dismantle the line in the late 1970s, the store and some of the surrounding residences remained intact through the latter half of the 20th century.

Renovations began at the store in 2016, and it was listed on the National Register of Historic Places on October 12, 2017. Though often compared to the St. James General Store on the North Shore of Long Island, New York, that store has been operating continuously since it was established in the 1850s.

Preceding station	Atlantic Coast Line Railroad	Following station
Lacoochee toward St. Petersburg	Orange Belt Railway after 1921	Tarrytown toward Sanford
