= Edith Fairfax Davenport =

Edith Fairfax Davenport (born July 13, 1880, in Kansas City — November 1, 1957, in Winter Park) was a painter and the first woman admitted to the École des Beaux Arts.

== Early life and education ==
Born in 1880 the granddaughter of Isabella McNeill, who was James McNeill Whistler's mother's sister; she moved with her family in 1884 from Kansas City, Missouri, to their new home in Zellwood, Florida. Her father, Judge Joe K. Davenport, had been the mayor of Kansas City, and the new house was on the shore of Lake Maggiore.

She studied at the École for 8 years, having been admitted in 1905, working with Jean-Paul Laurens and in the studio of Louis-Joseph-Raphaël Collin. She studied for a further 4 years in Florence, Italy. Upon returning to the United States, she studied with Howard Giles and Hans Hofmann and was a modernist by the 1930s.

== Career ==
With J. W. Paul she instituted the Free Public Library (later just the Public Library) in Zellwood in 1912. She co-founded the Orlando Art Association in 1924, exhibiting 30 of her paintings in its first show, and from 1952 onwards was president of the Florida Federation of Art. She worked for the Works Progress Administration from 1933 to 1937.

== Later life and death ==
Later in life she mainly focused on education, providing free tuition in art at the high school in Mount Dora and lecturing on art history at the Gainesville Association of Fine Arts.

She maintained a studio in the family home for many years, dividing her time between Zellwood and New York, until finally moving to Winter Park in 1955 where she died in 1957. She is buried in Kansas City.

== Works ==
Four of her paintings still reside in the 21st century in the Zellwood Historical Society's museum, including one of two full-size copies of Whistler's portrait of his mother that he authorized her to duplicate.

The other, entitled Après Whistler, "Arrangement in Grey and Black, No. 1: Portrait of the Painter's Mother" and painted in 1906, resides in the Whistler House Museum in Lowell, Massachusetts. They are the only full-size copies of the work, and Davenport reproduced them when the varnish on Whistler's original had yellowed with age. Thus they show what the Whistler painting looked like before it was later restored, even down to duplicating the original frame.

She bequested them to their current homes some time around 1950.

Other of her works include four murals — themed citrus, lumber, cattle, and turpentine — painted for the Chamber of Commerce building in Orlando.
