= Groveland station =

Coordinates: 28°33′41″N 81°51′21″W

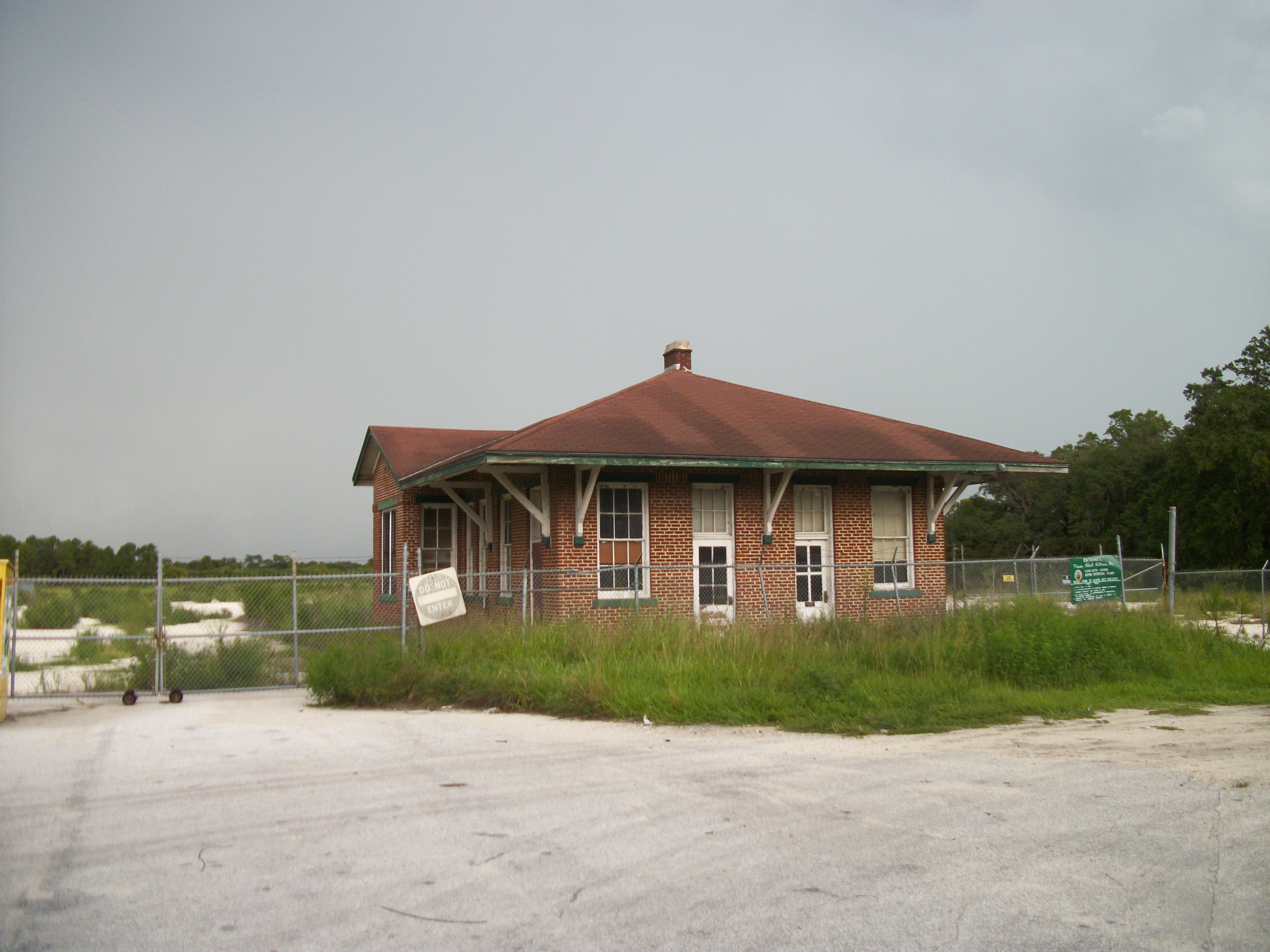
Groveland train depot.

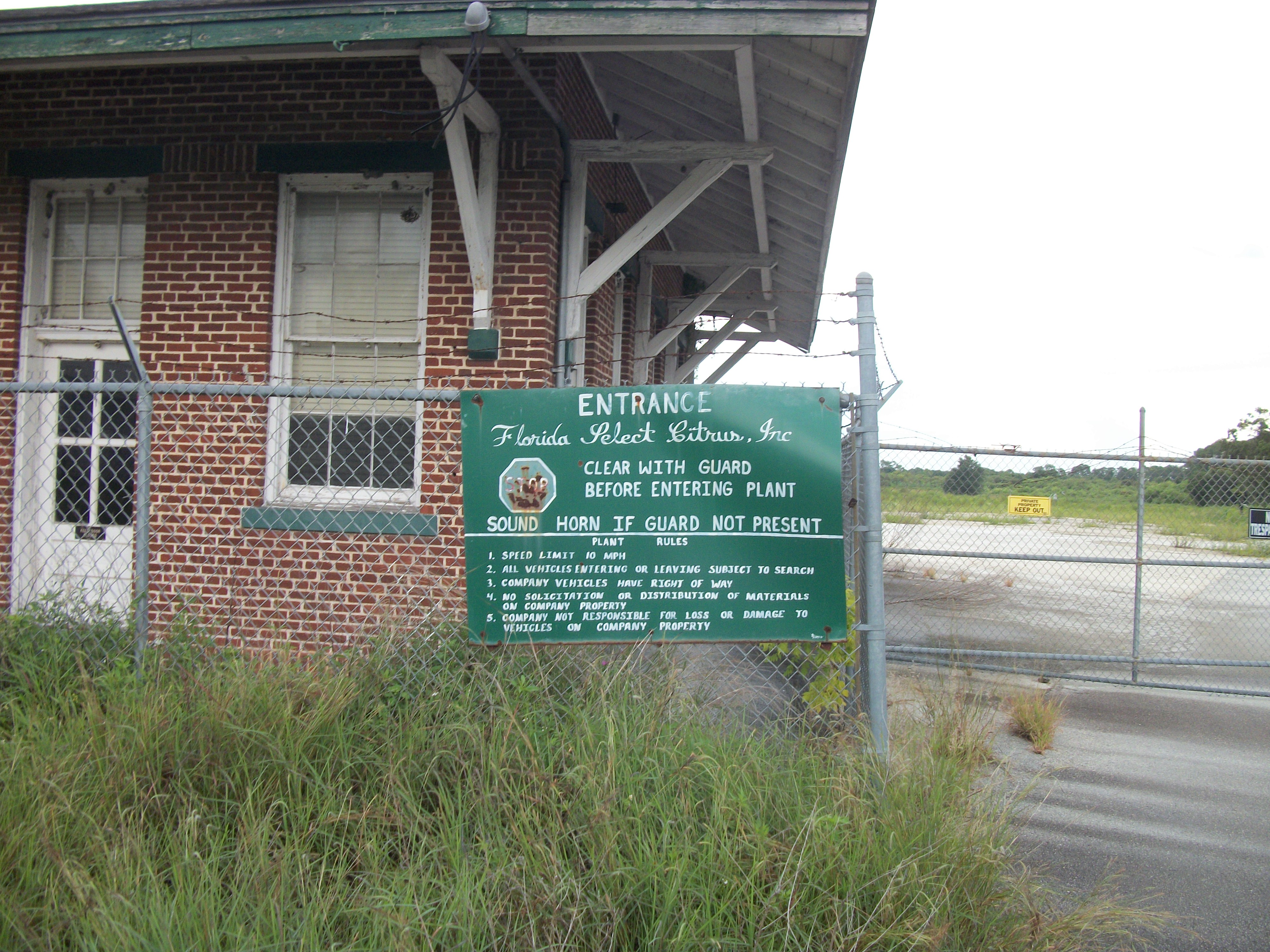
Gate at the entrance to the property, with signage for Select Citrus, Inc., in 2011.

The Groveland train depot is a historic depot building in Groveland, Florida. The rail line that serviced the station was originally built by the Orange Belt Railway and was later acquired by the Atlantic Coast Line Railroad. The station is now empty. It is located on the northwest corner of State Road 19 and westbound State Road 50.

Preceding station	Atlantic Coast Line Railroad	Following station
Mascotte toward St. Petersburg	Orange Belt Railway	Clermont toward Sanford
