= Lake Apopka Loop Trail =

- Length: 17.6 mi (28.3 km)
- Location: Lake Apopka, Florida, United States
- Trailheads: Magnolia Park, 28.6356°N 81.5506°W. Clay Island, 28.67487°N 81.7080°W. North Shore, 28.7049°N 81.6765°W. Green Mountain, 28.6469°N 81.7097°W.
- Use: Hiking, Cycling Horseback Riding in limited areas
- Season: Year-round
- Website: http://www.sjrwmd.com/recreationguide/lakeapopka/

The Lake Apopka Loop Trail is a trail running along Lake Apopka North Shore, connecting Magnolia Park and the Green Mountain Scenic Overlook and Trailhead. It is managed by the St. Johns River Water Management District.

== Route ==
The paved trail begins at Magnolia Park and continues along the northern shore of Lake Apopka and through reclaimed wetland to the Green Mountain Scenic Overlook. Four miles from Magnolia Park is a historic pump house, and the hiking trail intersects with the Wildlife Drive. Hikers, cyclists, and cars share the road for just over 1 mile. After another 6.5 miles, the trail meets the North Shore Trailhead. After another 2.3 miles, the trail joins the Clay Island Trail Loop, where it is 1.8 miles to the Clay Island Trailhead and 4.8 miles to the Green Mountain Trailhead.

There are restrooms and water fountains at Magnolia Park and the Green Mountain Scenic Overlook, and port-a-johns at the historic pump house, but none elsewhere along the trail.

== History ==
The trail was first opened on February 20, 2014, going from Magnolia Park to the Clay Island Trailhead. It was extended in April, 2016 to connect the Clay Island Trail Loop with the Green Mountain Scenic Overlook and Trailhead.

== Wildlife ==
Over 360 species of birds have been seen on the north shore of Lake Apopka, the highest total of species seen for any site in Florida. There are also several other animals that can be seen, including American alligators, raccoons, river otters, turtles, bobcats, and coyotes.

== Access and hours of operation ==
The trail is open daily from sunrise to sunset.

The Magnolia Park Trailhead is located on the north end of the east side of Magnolia Park, 2929 S Binion RD, Apopka, FL 32703.

The Clay Island Trailhead is located at 22526 Carolyn Lane, Astatula, FL 32703.

The Green Mountain Trailhead is located at 20700 County Road 455, Minneola, FL 34715.

The North Shore Trailhead is located at 24600 County Road 448-A, Mount Dora, FL 32757.
