= Lake Monroe, Florida =

Lake Monroe
- Unincorporated community
- Location within Seminole County, Florida
- Coordinates: 28°49′29″N 81°19′37″W
- Country: United States
- State: Florida
- County: Seminole
- Elevation: 13 ft (4.0 m)
- Time zone: UTC-5 (Eastern (EST))
  - Summer (DST): UTC-4 (EDT)
- ZIP code: 32747
- Area codes: 407, 689 & 321
- GNIS feature ID: 285265

Lake Monroe is an unincorporated community in Seminole County, Florida, United States. Its ZIP code is 32747.

== History ==
The Jacksonville, Tampa and Key West Railway (JT&KW) completed a bridge over the St. Johns River just north of Lake Monroe in 1886. Later that year the Orange Belt Railway connected to the JT&KW near the bridge, and built a station named "Monroe Station" at the junction. Both the JT&KW and the Orange Belt continued from Monroe Station to Sanford.

A real estate development called St. Joseph's Colony was platted on 640 acres near Monroe Station in 1887. The development, promoted by Henry Sanford's Florida Land and Colonization Company, was advertised to German immigrants as a Roman Catholic community, with a town lot set aside for a Catholic chapel. A German Roman Catholic priest, Felix Prosper Swenbergh, was recruited by Sanford to oversee the colony. Swembergh died of yellow fever in 1891, and the chapel was never built. While some Germans did move to the colony, the German character of the community had faded by early in the 20th century.

In 1916 an automobile bridge across the St. Johns River replaced the existing ferry. A post office named "Ahearn" was opened in 1916. A community petition protesting the name chosen for the post office resulted in the name being changed to "Lake Monroe" by the end of the year.

== Sources ==
- Carlson, Charlie; Kinlaw-Best, Christine (2000). The History of Monroe. Sanford, Florida: The Sanford Historical Society, Inc.
