= Groveland, Florida =

- City
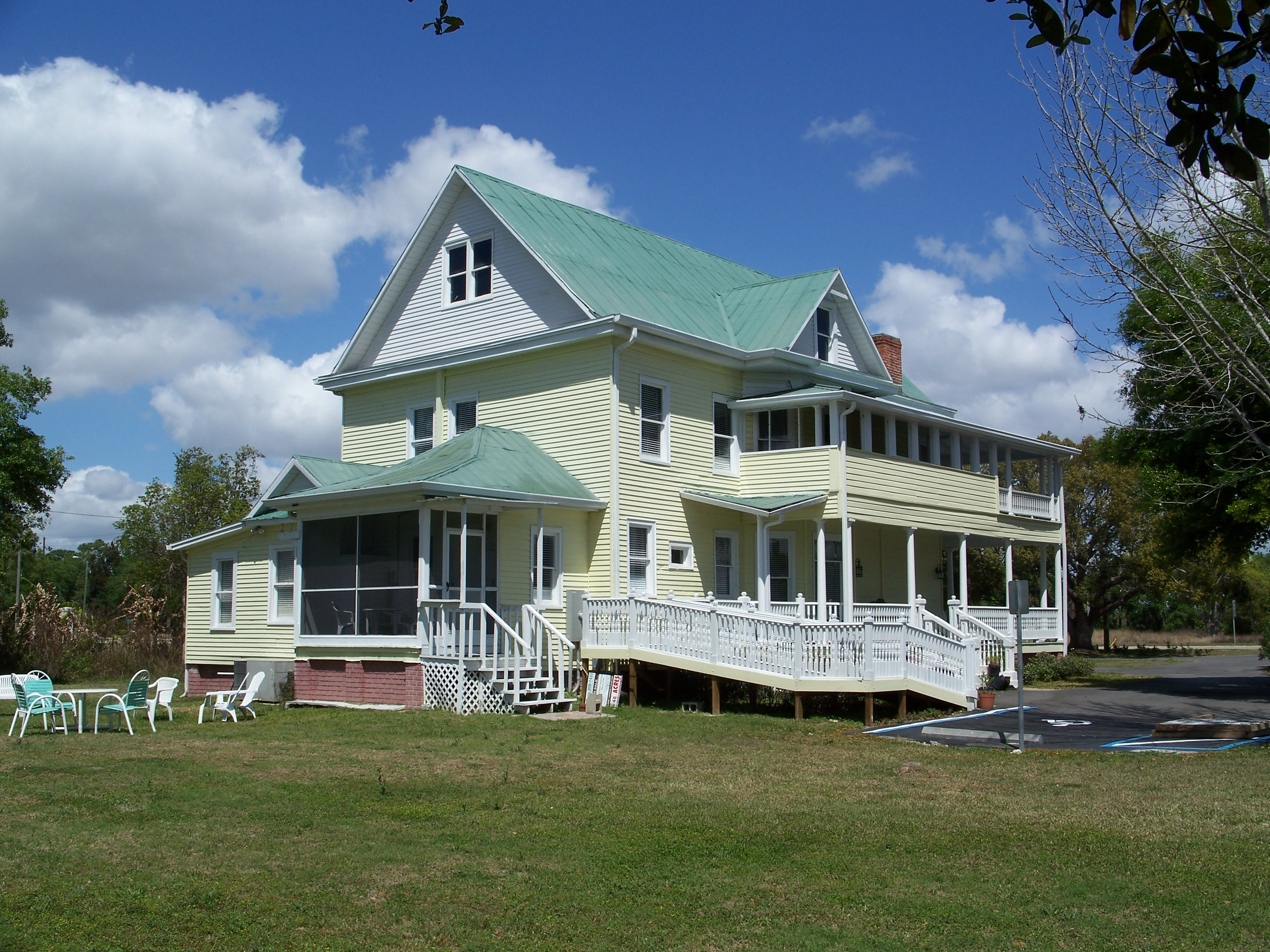
- Historic Edge House

- Icon

- Location in Lake County and the state of Florida
- Coordinates: 28°36′45″N 81°50′48″W
- Country: United States
- State: Florida
- County: Lake

Area
  - Total: 27.46 sq mi (71.12 km^{2})
  - Land: 20.84 sq mi (53.98 km^{2})
  - Water: 6.61 sq mi (17.13 km^{2})
- Elevation: 89 ft (27 m)

Population (2020)
  - Total: 18,505
  - Density: 887.8/sq mi (342.79/km^{2})
- Time zone: UTC-5 (Eastern (EST))
  - Summer (DST): UTC-4 (EDT)
- ZIP code: 34736
- Area code: 352
- FIPS code: 12-27800
- GNIS feature ID: 2403764
- Website: groveland-fl.gov

Groveland is a city in Lake County, Florida, United States. The population was 18,505 at the 2020 census. It is located at the intersection of State Road 19 and State Road 33/50.

Groveland is part of the Orlando–Kissimmee–Sanford Metropolitan Statistical Area. Groveland is recognized as the first international Dark Sky Community in Florida, and in the Southeastern United States, by DarkSky International.

== Geography ==
According to the United States Census Bureau, the city has a total area of 27.46 square miles (71.1 km^{2}), of which 20.84 square miles (54.0 km^{2}) is land and 6.62 square miles (17.1 km^{2}) (24.1%) is water.

== Demographics ==
Historical population
Census	Pop.	Note	%±
1930	470		—
1940	411		−12.6%
1950	1,028		150.1%
1960	1,747		69.9%
1970	1,928		10.4%
1980	1,992		3.3%
1990	2,300		15.5%
2000	2,360		2.6%
2010	8,729		269.9%
2020	18,505		112.0%
2022 (est.)	22,374	▲	20.9%
U.S. Decennial Census

=== Racial and ethnic composition ===
Groveland racial composition (Hispanics excluded from racial categories) (NH = Non-Hispanic)
Race	Pop 2010	Pop 2020	% 2010	% 2020
White (NH)	4,445	8,615	50.92%	46.55%
Black or African American (NH)	1,385	2,901	15.87%	15.68%
Native American or Alaska Native (NH)	69	57	0.79%	0.31%
Asian (NH)	211	486	2.42%	2.63%
Pacific Islander or Native Hawaiian (NH)	8	6	0.09%	0.03%
Some other race (NH)	103	262	1.18%	1.42%
Two or more races/Multiracial (NH)	245	842	2.81%	4.55%
Hispanic or Latino (any race)	2,263	5,336	25.93%	28.84%
Total	8,729	18,505		

=== 2020 census ===
As of the 2020 census, Groveland had a population of 18,505. The median age was 38.9 years. 24.3% of residents were under the age of 18 and 17.5% of residents were 65 years of age or older. For every 100 females there were 91.6 males, and for every 100 females age 18 and over there were 89.6 males age 18 and over.

93.6% of residents lived in urban areas, while 6.4% lived in rural areas.

There were 6,398 households in Groveland, of which 37.3% had children under the age of 18 living in them. Of all households, 61.5% were married-couple households, 11.3% were households with a male householder and no spouse or partner present, and 21.0% were households with a female householder and no spouse or partner present. About 15.7% of all households were made up of individuals and 7.2% had someone living alone who was 65 years of age or older. There were 3,757 families in the city.

There were 6,880 housing units, of which 7.0% were vacant. The homeowner vacancy rate was 1.8% and the rental vacancy rate was 7.2%.

Racial composition as of the 2020 census
Race	Number	Percent
White	9,792	52.9%
Black or African American	3,011	16.3%
American Indian and Alaska Native	117	0.6%
Asian	496	2.7%
Native Hawaiian and Other Pacific Islander	6	0.0%
Some other race	2,104	11.4%
Two or more races	2,979	16.1%
Hispanic or Latino (of any race)	5,336	28.8%

=== 2010 census ===
As of the 2010 United States census, there were 8,729 people, 2,465 households, and 2,014 families residing in the city.

=== 2000 census ===
As of the census of 2000, there were 7,901 people, 845 households, and 626 families residing in the city. The population density was 897.1 inhabitants per square mile (346.4/km^{2}). There were 921 housing units at an average density of 350.1 per square mile (135.2/km^{2}). The racial makeup of the city was 68.81% White, 22.42% African American, 0.76% Native American, 0.55% Asian, 6.27% from other races, and 1.19% from two or more races. Hispanic or Latino of any race were 14.70% of the population.

In 2000, there were 845 households, out of which 35.3% had children under the age of 18 living with them, 55.1% were married couples living together, 12.9% had a female householder with no husband present, and 25.8% were non-families. 21.8% of all households were made up of individuals, and 9.2% had someone living alone who was 65 years of age or older. The average household size was 2.79 and the average family size was 3.23.

In 2000, in the city, the population was spread out, with 28.3% under the age of 18, 8.9% from 18 to 24, 27.5% from 25 to 44, 22.7% from 45 to 64, and 12.6% who were 65 years of age or older. The median age was 35 years. For every 100 females, there were 97.5 males. For every 100 females age 18 and over, there were 93.0 males.

In 2000, the median income for a household in the city was $32,017, and the median income for a family was $37,857. Males had a median income of $27,292 versus $20,186 for females. The per capita income for the city was $15,132. About 13.9% of families and 18.8% of the population were below the poverty line, including 23.9% of those under age 18 and 22.6% of those age 65 or over.

== History ==
=== Groveland case ===
In 1949 four young African-American men (Samuel Shepherd, Walter Irvin, Charles Greenlee, and Ernest Thomas) were charged with raping a 17-year-old white farm girl in Groveland, Florida. They were convicted by an all-white jury. The case was appealed to the Florida Supreme Court which found that:

Two witnesses for the State testified as to the identity of the four [men]. From the description of the automobile as given by the two witnesses the same was later located. The three defendants testified they were driving the car in question during the same hours of the early morning except they were driving in the Orlando area, which was in the opposite direction.

In addition to the eyewitness testimony, there was physical evidence linking the car in which the young men were riding to the crime. The Florida Supreme Court stated:

Near the scene of the crime a handkerchief and some cotton were found. The woman was found near the scene of the crime about dawn. A large track about the scene fit the shoe of one of the appellants. Cotton or lint about the car and broken glass in the automobile testified to by the woman assisted the officers in identifying the car which the appellants admit they were riding in at the exact hour the State charge the crime was committed.

The victim testified that she had known Shepherd for years and that Irvin was someone she had seen in and around the Groveland community before the night of the assault. She reported the rape to the police within five hours after it occurred. One of the three men she accused (Thomas) was shot and killed by the police during his arrest.

After the Florida Supreme Court decided to uphold the guilty verdicts, the United States Supreme Court agreed to hear the case.

Attorney Thurgood Marshall, then the special counsel with the NAACP's Legal Defense Fund, represented the four men, on the briefs, taking their case to the U.S. Supreme Court. Oral argument was conducted by attorney Franklin H. Williams. The Supreme Court overturned the guilty verdicts. The Court found that sensational headlines in the local papers ("Night Riders Burn Lake Negro Homes" and "Flames From Negro Homes Light Night Sky in Lake County"), and newspaper reports of the sheriff's statement that the young men had confessed while in custody, resulted in an unfair trial. "These defendants were prejudged as guilty and the trial was but a legal gesture to register a verdict already dictated by the press and the public opinion which it generated." A new trial was ordered.

In 1949, Harry T. Moore, the executive director of the Florida NAACP, organized a campaign against the conviction of the Groveland Four. Soon afterward, Sheriff Willis V. McCall of Lake County, Florida, shot Shepherd and Irvin. He asserted that they were trying to escape. Shepherd was killed, and Irvin was seriously wounded. When Irvin recovered, he told investigators that the sheriff had shot the two prisoners, without provocation, while they were in handcuffs.

Moore demanded that the sheriff be indicted for murder and requested that the Governor suspend McCall from office. On December 25, 1951, a bomb exploded in Moore's house, killing him and his wife, Harriette.

Some alleged that Sheriff McCall was associated with ordering this bombing; however, an extensive FBI investigation at the time and additional separate investigations have failed to produce any evidence supporting allegations of McCall's involvement.

Although members of the Ku Klux Klan were suspected of the crime, the people responsible were never brought to trial.

In 2016, the City of Groveland and Lake County each apologized to survivors of the four men for the injustice against them. On April 18, 2017, a resolution of the Florida House of Representatives requested that all four men be exonerated. The Florida Senate quickly passed a similar resolution; lawmakers called on Governor Rick Scott to officially pardon the men. On January 11, 2019, the Florida Board of Executive Clemency voted to pardon the Groveland Four. Newly elected Governor Ron DeSantis subsequently did so. On November 22, 2021, Judge Heidi Davis granted the state's motion to posthumously exonerate the men.

=== Grant money for cemeteries ===
In 2022, the city received a large grant to restore The Oak Tree Union Colored Cemetery of Taylorville, an abandoned cemetery in Groveland.

== Arts and Culture ==
=== International Dark Sky Community ===
In 2022, the City of Groveland passed a robust outdoor lighting ordinance to help curb light pollution against the ongoing rapid development. The ordinance requires residential and commercial development to have responsible outdoor lighting that minimizes glare, reduces light trespass, and does not pollute the night sky. Groveland is currently retrofitting old streetlamps with dark-sky-friendly lights, which are shielded downward with a low color temperature with the goal to replace every light fixture by 2027.

In 2023, the City of Groveland became the first certified International Dark Sky Community in Florida and the Southeast US. This achievement is the result of a three-year Dark Sky Initiative that included extensive education, community outreach, events, the adoption of a comprehensive lighting ordinance, a citywide lighting inventory, and numerous commitments intended to reduce light pollution and protect the night sky. Groveland held its first Star Party in 2023 at Cherrylake Farms, attracting over 700 attendees.

The City of Groveland continues to work with new residents, potential developers and neighboring communities to raise awareness about the importance of natural night skies, to improve safety and quality of life, and to protect the natural environment for all living things.

== Transportation ==
Osborn Airfield is located three miles southwest of the city. The airport is private, but is open for general aviation. The disused Groveland train depot is also located in the city.

== Notable people ==
- Jeff Demps, former Running back and Olympic Silver Medalist in London 2012
- Jonotthan Harrison, NFL player
- Art Heyman, collegiate basketball player
- Jett Noland, Professional Racing Driver
