= Oakland, Florida =

Town in Florida, US

- Town
- Town of Oakland
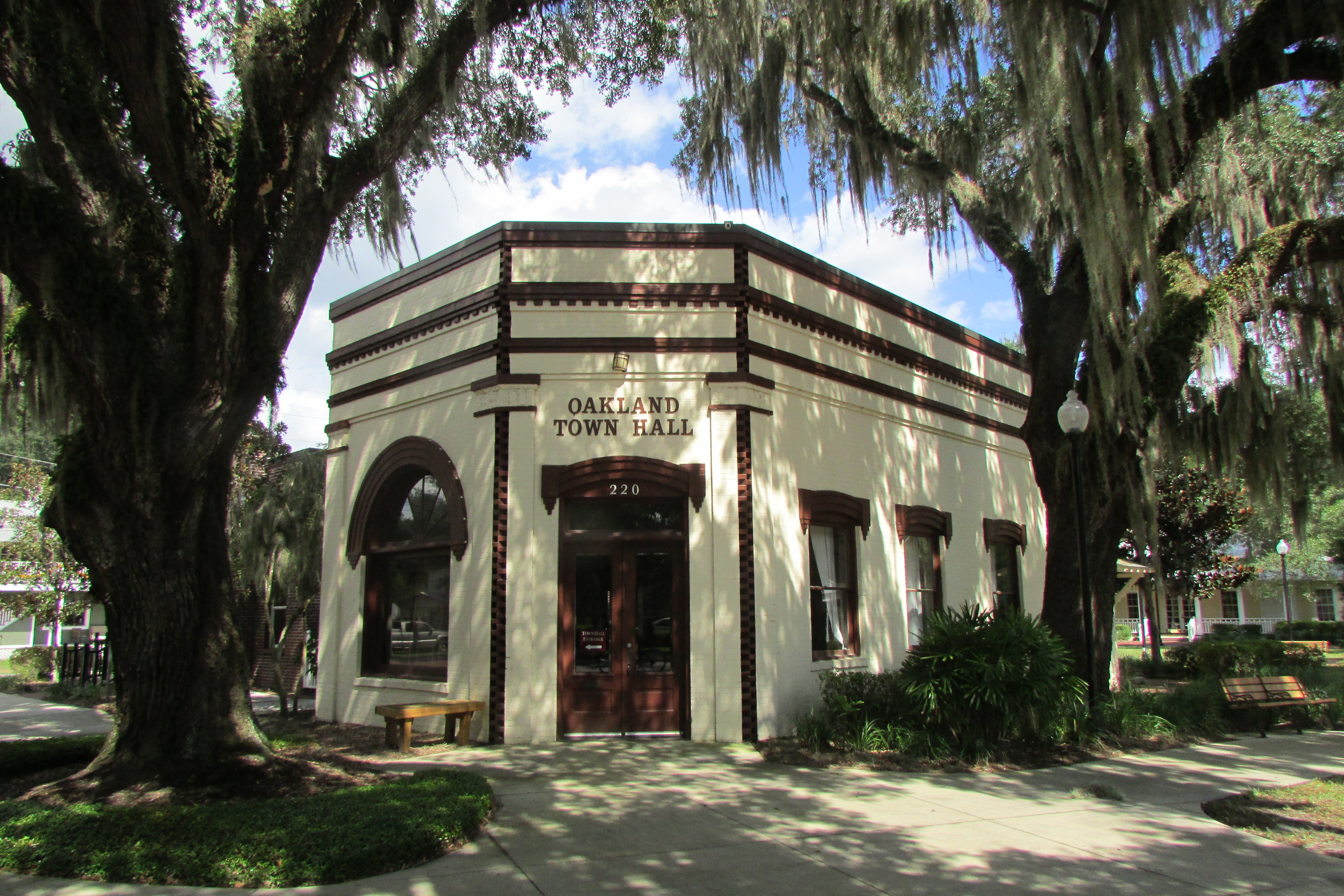
- Historic Oakland Town Hall, constructed in 1912

- Logo

- Location in Orange County and the state of Florida
- Coordinates: 28°33′18″N 81°37′45″W
- Country: United States
- State: Florida
- County: Orange
- Settled: 1857–1860
- Incorporated: November 1, 1887
- Reincorporated and Chartered: 1891

Government
  - Type: Commission-Manager
  - Mayor: Shane Taylor
  - Vice Mayor: Michael Satterfield
  - Commissioners: Joseph McMullen, Kris Keller, and Yumeko Motley
  - Town Manager: Elise Hui
  - Town Clerk: Kathy Heard

Area
  - Total: 2.36 sq mi (6.12 km^{2})
  - Land: 2.36 sq mi (6.11 km^{2})
  - Water: 0.0039 sq mi (0.01 km^{2})
- Elevation: 105 ft (32 m)

Population (2020)
  - Total: 3,516
  - Density: 1,490/sq mi (575.3/km^{2})
- Time zone: UTC-5 (Eastern (EST))
  - Summer (DST): UTC-4 (EDT)
- ZIP codes: 34760, 34787
- Area codes: 407, 689
- FIPS code: 12-50525
- GNIS feature ID: 2404412
- Website: www.oaklandfl.gov

Oakland is a town in Orange County, Florida, United States. The population was 3,516 at the 2020 Census, representing a growth of 38.5% over the population of 2,538 recorded during the 2010 census. It is part of the Orlando–Kissimmee Metropolitan Statistical Area.

== Geography ==
According to the United States Census Bureau, the town has a total area of 2.10 square miles (5.45 km^{2}), of which 2.10 square miles (5.44 km^{2}) is land and 0.0077 square miles (0.02 km^{2}), or 0.34%, is water.

=== Climate ===
The climate in this area is characterized by hot, humid summers and generally mild winters. According to the Köppen climate classification, the town has a humid subtropical climate zone (Cfa).

== History ==
In 1857, James Gamble Speer settled in Oakland after buying all the land between Lake Apopka and Johns Lake. In 1860, the Oakland post office opened and closed in 1867. During the Civil War, the post office at Oakland was the only one operating within the present-day boundaries of Orange County, as Orlando's was closed from 1861 to 1866. Oakland post office reopened in 1877. During a time of great growth in the region during the 1880s, Oakland emerged as the center of commerce in west Orange County. The Town of Oakland was officially on November 1, 1887. However, a fire in the business district and a subsequent period of freezes in rapid succession throughout the 1890s, along with the growth of nearby Winter Garden, seemed to ensure that Oakland would remain as little more than a sleepy community. In 1891, the Florida Legislature officially reincorporated after being chartered. In 1940, Oakland surpassed nearby Maitland in population, ranking at #6 in the county. In 1950, however, Oakland fell back to #7, with a population of 545, the majority of whom were Black.

== Demographics ==
Historical population
Census	Pop.	Note	%±
1910	211		—
1920	323		53.1%
1930	379		17.3%
1940	518		36.7%
1950	548		5.8%
1960	821		49.8%
1970	672		−18.1%
1980	658		−2.1%
1990	700		6.4%
2000	936		33.7%
2010	2,538		171.2%
2020	3,516		38.5%
U.S. Decennial Census; Florida Department of Agriculture

=== Racial and ethnic composition ===
Oakland racial composition (Hispanics excluded from racial categories) (NH = Non-Hispanic)
Race	Pop 2010	Pop 2020	% 2010	% 2020
White (NH)	1,533	2,137	60.40%	60.78%
Black or African American (NH)	509	445	20.06%	12.66%
Native American or Alaska Native (NH)	11	12	0.43%	0.34%
Asian (NH)	121	128	4.77%	3.64%
Pacific Islander or Native Hawaiian (NH)	3	0	0.12%	0.00%
Some other race (NH)	47	54	1.85%	1.54%
Two or more races/Multiracial (NH)	60	195	2.36%	5.55%
Hispanic or Latino (any race)	254	545	10.01%	15.50%
Total	2,538	3,516		

=== 2020 census ===
As of the 2020 US census, Oakland had a population of 3,516. The median age was 37.9 years. 23.6% of residents were under the age of 18 and 11.7% of residents were 65 years of age or older. For every 100 females there were 92.8 males, and for every 100 females age 18 and over there were 88.0 males age 18 and over.

As of 2020, 96.2% of residents lived in urban areas, while 3.8% lived in rural areas.

In 2020, there were 1,229 households in Oakland, of which 41.4% had children under the age of 18 living in them. Of all households, 61.3% were married-couple households, 10.7% were households with a male householder and no spouse or partner present, and 22.1% were households with a female householder and no spouse or partner present. About 15.1% of all households were made up of individuals and 4.3% had someone living alone who was 65 years of age or older.

In 2020, there were 1,339 housing units, of which 8.2% were vacant. The homeowner vacancy rate was 5.1% and the rental vacancy rate was 6.2%.

According to 2020 American Community Survey estimates, there were 719 families residing in the town.

=== 2010 census ===
As of the 2010 United States census, there were 2,538 people, 753 households, and 654 families residing in the town.

In 2010, the population density was 1,209.15 person per square mile (466.86 person/km^{2}). There were 931 housing units and 753 households, out of which 40.3% had children under the age of 18 living with them, 64.9% were married couples living together, 11.7% had a female householder with no husband present, and 19.0% were non-families. 14.2% of all households were made up of individuals, and 3.2% had someone living alone who was 65 years of age or older. The average household size was 2.99 and the average family size was 3.32. Compared to the 2000 Census, Oakland has become more family dominant, with a decrease in both its share of senior citizen population and non-family households.

In 2010, in the town, the population was spread out, with 29.3% under the age of 19, 5.5% from 20 to 24, 25.7% from 25 to 44, 30% from 45 to 64, and 9.3% who were 65 years of age or older. The median age was 39 years. For every 100 females, there were 93.1 males. For every 100 females age 18 and over, there were 90.5 males.

In 2010, the median income for a household in the town was $100,927, and the median income for a family was $102,396. Males had a median income of $65,781 versus $54,444 for females. The per capita income for the town was $39,802. About 6.1% of families and 6.9% of the population were below the poverty line, including 5.5% of those under age 18. Oakland has seen an explosion of wealth compared to the American Community Survey numbers last released with the 2000 Census. Comparatively, the median income for households and families has more than doubled while the per capita income increased by nearly 75%. Meanwhile, poverty as a whole has stayed statistically the same.

=== 2000 census ===
As of the census of 2000, there were 936 people, 341 households, and 257 families residing in the town. The population density was 574.2 person per square mile (221.7 person/km^{2}). There were 379 housing units at an average density of 232.5 houses per square mile (89.8 houses/km^{2}). The racial makeup of the town was 64.74% White, 31.30% African American, 0.11% Native American, 1.07% Asian, 0.64% from other races, and 2.14% from two or more races. Hispanic or Latino of any race were 3.53% of the population.

In 2000, there were 341 households out of which 34.0% had children under the age of 18 living with them, 54.5% were married couples living together, 15.2% had a female householder with no husband present, and 24.6% were non-families. 18.8% of all households were made up of individuals and 5.6% had someone living alone who was 65 years of age or older. The average household size was 2.74 and the average family size was 3.12.

In 2000, in the town the population was spread out with 28.1% under the age of 18, 5.4% from 18 to 24, 28.4% from 25 to 44, 27.4% from 45 to 64, and 10.7% who were 65 years of age or older. The median age was 39 years. For every 100 females there were 92.6 males. For every 100 females age 18 and over, there were 87.5 males.

In 2000, the median income for a household in the town was $52,159, and the median income for a family was $56,250. Males had a median income of $40,000 versus $36,161 for females. The per capita income for the town was $22,857. About 5.2% of families and 5.9% of the population were below the poverty line, including 6.6% of those under age 18 and 8.9% of those age 65 or over.

== Education ==
Orange County Public Schools operates public schools in the county. Zoned schools include:

- Tildenville Elementary School
- Lakeview Middle School
- West Orange High School

The town government operates the Oakland Avenue Charter School (OACS). As of 2017 it has 536 students.
