= Clarcona, Florida =

Unincorporated area in Florida, US

- Census-designated place
- Coordinates: 28°37′30″N 81°30′05″W
- Country: United States
- State: Florida
- County: Orange

Area
  - Total: 4.37 sq mi (11.33 km^{2})
  - Land: 4.15 sq mi (10.75 km^{2})
  - Water: 0.22 sq mi (0.57 km^{2})
- Elevation: 85 ft (26 m)

Population (2020)
  - Total: 3,283
  - Density: 790.7/sq mi (305.28/km^{2})
- Time zone: UTC-5 (Eastern (EST))
  - Summer (DST): UTC-4 (EDT)
- ZIP code: 32710
- Area codes: 407, 689
- FIPS code: 12-12675
- GNIS feature ID: 2583336

Clarcona is a census-designated place and unincorporated area in Orange County, Florida, United States. As of the 2020 census, Clarcona had a population of 3,283. It is part of the Orlando–Kissimmee Metropolitan Statistical Area.

== Geography ==
Clarcona is located in western Orange County, Florida, 8 miles (13 km) northwest of downtown Orlando.

According to the United States Census Bureau, the CDP has a total area of 5.5 square miles (14.2 km^{2}), of which 5.1 square miles (13.2 km^{2}) is land and 0.42 square miles (1.1 km^{2}), or 7.59%, is water.

== Demographics ==
Historical population
Census	Pop.	Note	%±
2020	3,283		—
U.S. Decennial Census

Clarcona first appeared as a census designated place in the 2010 U.S. census.

=== 2020 census ===
As of the 2020 census, Clarcona had a population of 3,283. The median age was 45.6 years. 17.6% of residents were under the age of 18 and 20.3% of residents were 65 years of age or older. For every 100 females there were 102.5 males, and for every 100 females age 18 and over there were 99.1 males age 18 and over.

100.0% of residents lived in urban areas, while 0.0% lived in rural areas.

There were 1,360 households in Clarcona, of which 24.1% had children under the age of 18 living in them. Of all households, 38.8% were married-couple households, 22.6% were households with a male householder and no spouse or partner present, and 29.6% were households with a female householder and no spouse or partner present. About 31.0% of all households were made up of individuals and 12.9% had someone living alone who was 65 years of age or older.

There were 1,526 housing units, of which 10.9% were vacant. The homeowner vacancy rate was 2.0% and the rental vacancy rate was 11.6%.

Racial composition as of the 2020 census
Race	Number	Percent
White	2,004	61.0%
Black or African American	439	13.4%
American Indian and Alaska Native	24	0.7%
Asian	68	2.1%
Native Hawaiian and Other Pacific Islander	5	0.2%
Some other race	236	7.2%
Two or more races	507	15.4%
Hispanic or Latino (of any race)	666	20.3%
