= Lake Apopka =

Lake in Florida, United States

- Location within Florida Location within the United States
- Location: Orange / Lake counties, Florida, United States
- Coordinates: 28°37′14″N 81°37′19″W
- Basin countries: United States
- Max. length: 12.3 mi (19.8 km)
- Max. width: 9.7 mi (15.6 km)
- Surface area: 30,800 acres (125 km^{2})
- Average depth: 15.4 feet (4.7 m)

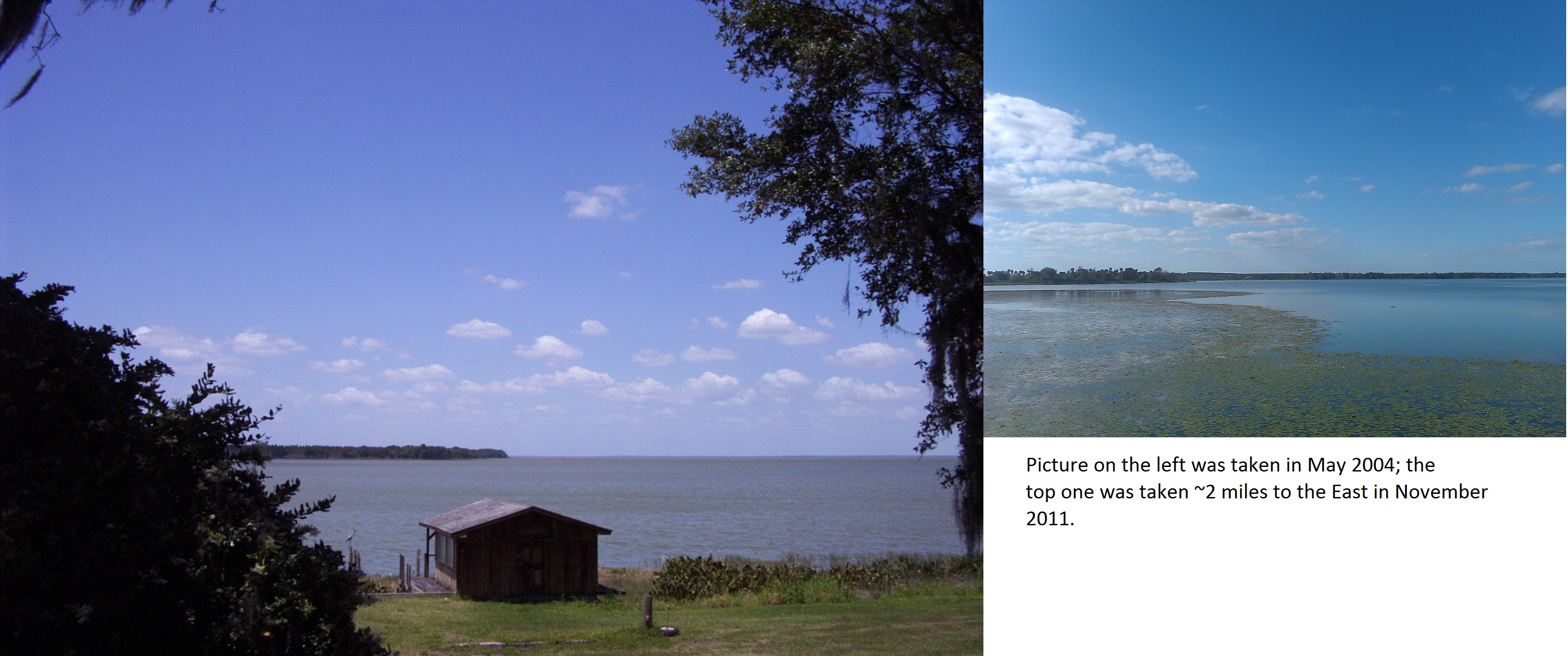
Views of Lake Apopka from its southern shore; 2004 and 2011 respectively.

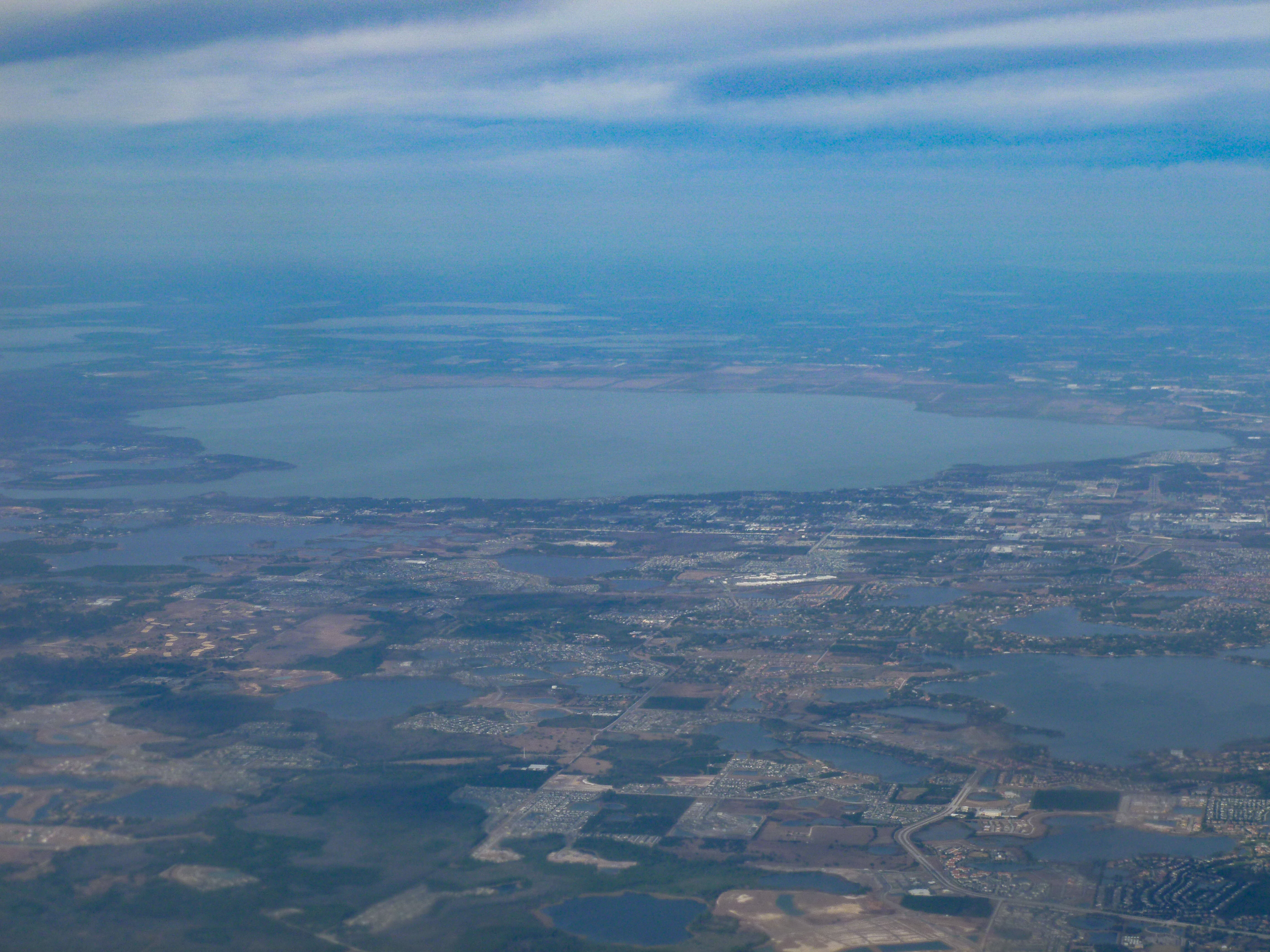
Lake Apopka, as viewed from a commercial flight on January 21, 2012.

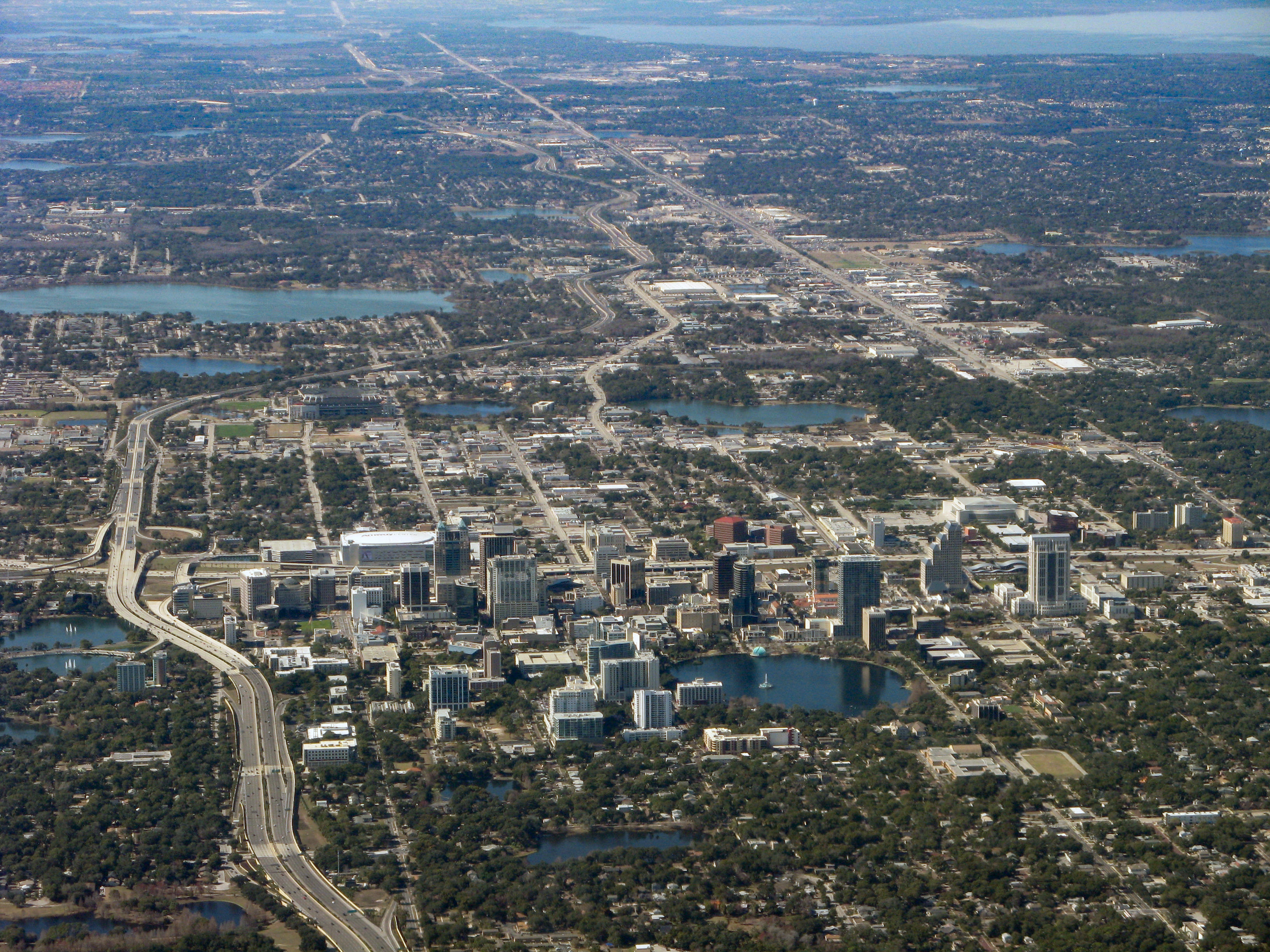
Aerial of downtown Orlando, Florida. Lake Apopka is seen in the upper-right of the photo.

Lake Apopka is the fourth largest lake in the U.S. state of Florida. It is located 15 miles (24 km) northwest of Orlando, mostly within the bounds of Orange County, although the western part is in Lake County. Fed by a natural spring, rainfall and stormwater runoff, water from Lake Apopka flows through the Apopka-Beauclair Canal and into Lakes Beauclair and Dora. From Lake Dora, water flows into Lake Eustis, then into Lake Griffin and then northward into the Ocklawaha River, which flows into the St. Johns River. Multiple parks or nature trails are present around the lake including Magnolia Park, Lake Apopka Wildlife Drive, Ferndale Preserve, Oakland Nature Preserve, Dr. Bradford Memorial Park, and Newton Park, named for A. B. Newton.

== History ==
Through the 1940s, Lake Apopka was one of Central Florida's main attractions. Anglers traveled from throughout the United States to fish for trophy-sized bass in Lake Apopka, and 21 fish camps lined the lake's shoreline.

Lake Apopka has a history of more than 100 years of human alteration, beginning with construction of the Apopka-Beauclair Canal in 1888. In 1941, a levee was built along the north shore to drain 20,000 acres (80 km^{2}) of shallow marsh for farming. The discharge of water, rich in nutrients from agricultural and other sources, produced conditions that created a chronic algal bloom and resulted in loss of the lake's recreational value and game fish populations.

In July 1980, Tower Chemical Company (TCC), a local pesticide manufacturer, improperly disposed of significant amounts of DDE, a known endocrine disruptor, along with other toxic chemicals. As a result, these chemicals spilled into Lake Apopka, and the US Environmental Protection Agency was alerted. TCC shut down their operations in December 1980. In 1981, an EPA investigation began and the site was decommissioned and designated as a Superfund cleanup site. Despite their efforts, some of the chemicals seeped into the Florida aquifer and have proliferated into some of Central Florida's interconnected lakes and waterways. This chemical has caused health problems in much of the lake's wildlife population, and has caused infertility and other sexual disorders in several species, including alligators.

In 1991, a coalition of real estate interests from the West Orange Community organized the Friends of Lake Apopka (FOLA) with the goal of reclaiming the lake from the agricultural interests who were discharging phosphorus laden water into the lake basin. Water from the lake was used to flood the farm fields during the hot summer months to restrict erosion and then discharged back to the lake before the growing season. A series of canals and high capacity pumps allowed the water to be introduced for irrigation and flooding or to discharge it when necessary. The phosphate laden water created a hypereutrophic condition resulting in algal blooms, robbing the lake water of oxygen and sunlight necessary to sustain plant life on the lake bottom. Over the decades, this condition caused the sandy bottom lake to be covered by a deep layer of muck.

In 1996, Governor Lawton Chiles signed the Lake Apopka Restoration Act that provided funding to purchase the farmland responsible for the discharges. The shuttering of the farms allowed for the St. Johns River Water Management District (SJRWMD) to begin plans to convert the fields back to the marsh area it had once been. A survey was taken of the site that identified the hot spots that contained chemical contamination, and cleanup was initiated.

=== North Shore Enhancement Area (NSEA) ===
Historically, more than 85 percent of the phosphorus going into Lake Apopka was from farms on the lake's north shore. To combat this problem, the District and the U.S. Department of Agriculture (USDA) purchased almost all of the farms for restoration between 1988 and 2001. This contributed to reducing discharges of excessive nutrients from farms to the lake.

The 1996 Lake Apopka Improvement and Management Act authorized the District to set a phosphorus concentration target. Subsequently, the District established a restoration phosphorus-loading target for Lake Apopka of 15.9 metric tons of phosphorus per year. This represents a 75 percent reduction from 1989 to 1994 farming discharges. The target was later adopted as a total maximum daily load (TMDL) for the lake, which has a goal of attaining an in-lake total phosphorus concentration of 55 parts per billion (ppb).

Restoration of wetlands on the NSEA can reduce stormwater discharges to Lake Apopka and related nutrient loading, accelerating the enhancement of the lake. The innovative restoration and remediation plan for the NSEA focuses on infrastructure requirements, soil inversion and soil amendment work needed to prepare the system for wetland restoration. The soil inversion process was developed as a remediation method to address the high levels of organochlorine pesticides (OCPs) found in organic surface soils (the top 30 centimeters (cm) of soil). The pesticides remain in the organic soils from years of farm pesticide applications. The inversion process used modified farm equipment to plow up to one meter deep and essentially flip the soil, bringing up uncontaminated soil to the surface and covering the contaminated surface layer of soil. The work was completed in May 2009 and it helped ensure that OCPs were unable to enter the food chain. The inversion process reduced contaminants in the biologically active soil layer to safe levels on about 1,600 hectares (4,000 acres) in the NSEA.

Soils in the NSEA also contained excess nutrients such as phosphorus due to many years of agricultural production. Applying a “soil amendment,” which is a drinking water treatment residual, helps to trap excess phosphorus in soils. This helps mitigate the release of phosphorus from the soil to overlying water when the area is reflooded. The soil amendment was applied to about 2,800 hectares (7,000 acres) in the NSEA and was mostly complete in 2009.

As infrastructure construction is completed for each phase, a biological assessment is prepared for review and submitted to the U.S. Fish and Wildlife Service (USFWS). With USFWS concurrence, saturation and restoration flooding begins. The infrastructure is designed to help establish full wetland habitat with a wide range of water levels. The infrastructure also allows water transfer among different areas within the NSEA to minimize the need to discharge waters to the lake.

As each new phase is flooded and naturally populated with wildlife, fish samples are routinely collected and analyzed to ensure that pesticide levels in their tissues are below established safe levels for fish-eating birds. Newly flooded phases are carefully monitored for at least one year to ensure that any accumulation of pesticides through the aquatic food web do not present a risk to water birds. In addition, weekly bird surveys are conducted to monitor usage and to ensure that problems are detected quickly. As of January 2011 nearly 4,000 hectares (9,870 acres) are in various stages of reflooding.

On February 20, 2014, the Lake Apopka Loop Trail, which goes through the NSEA, was opened to the public.

=== The Marsh Flow-Way ===
The Marsh Flow-Way, which is a constructed wetland, is located along the northwest shore of Lake Apopka and west of the Apopka-Beauclair Canal. It began operation in November 2003 and the goal of the project is to remove phosphorus and suspended material already in Lake Apopka water.

The system covers approximately 760 acres (310 ha) and contains four individual wetland cells, in addition to levees, canals and ditches. The Marsh Flow-Way treats water pumped into it from Lake Apopka. The lake's water has excessive amounts of phosphorus, algae and suspended matter. Water flows west to east and is controlled by screw gates and riser boards in the individual cells. Treated water from all cells collects in a pump basin, where water is pumped into the Apopka Beauclair Canal. Most of the cleaner, treated water returns to Lake Apopka, while the remainder flows downstream toward Lake County Water Authority's nutrient removal facility (NuRF).

Dominant vegetation communities growing in flow-way cells are shallow marsh and shrub swamp species. Shallow marsh includes species such as pickerelweed (Pontederia cordata), arrowhead (Sagittaria lancifolia), cattail (Typha sp.), while shrub swamp includes primrose willow (Ludwigia peruviana), and some Salix spp. Open water areas are common in wetland cells.

As incoming lake water passes through the Marsh Flow-Way's emergent vegetation, the water's flow rate slows and suspended particles, which contain phosphorus and other nutrients, settle out of the water column. The accumulating settled organic particles, along with settled decayed wetland vegetation, form new organic material layers, which overlay native soils. Retention time of lake water within the flow-way system typically ranges between two and seven days in the individual wetland cells. Water depths in the system can vary between 30 and 45 centimetres (12 and 18 in).

Like all ecologically engineered systems, the performance of the flow-way is seasonally variable. Typically, best performance is in cooler months (October through May), while poorer performance is in warm months (June through September). During the long-term (seven years of operation), performance is similar to initial predictions. On the long-term (through 2010), the system removes about 28 percent (2.7 metric tons per year) of the incoming total phosphorus load, and about 90 percent (4,500 metric tons per year) of the incoming total suspended solid load.

=== Harvesting gizzard shad ===
Removing gizzard shad from the lake removes the phosphorus contained in the shad's bodies as well as reduces the internal recycling of phosphorus within the lake. This improves water clarity by reducing the number of algae, which depend upon phosphorus for growth.

Harvesting shad from other lakes has resulted in an improved food web, reduced algae, improved water clarity and improved conditions for game fish populations. This procedure may produce the same results in Lake Apopka.

Through the fall of 2011, gizzard shad harvesting has removed about 8,400 metric tons (18.5 million pounds) of fish from the lake. This equates to removing about 58 metric tons (129,000 pounds) of phosphorus and 175 metric tons (387,000 pounds) of nitrogen via fish tissue, directly from the lake. In addition, the projected nutrient recycling reduction to the lake from gizzard shad feeding impacts is about 146 metric tons (322,000 pounds) of phosphorus and about 862 metric tons (1.9 million pounds) of nitrogen.

=== Restoring aquatic habitat ===
The District has planted wetland plant species behind protective barriers in Lake Apopka to provide habitat for fish and wildlife. These planting efforts are becoming less necessary as the lake's water quality and clarity improve and native aquatic plants re-establish themselves.

An ongoing effort is under way to map the locations and extent of more than 350 native submersed plant beds. This total number varies from year to year.

Improved water clarity has also made it possible for the nonnative invasive plant hydrilla to grow in the lake. Hydrilla can quickly outcompete native plants, so staff efforts are also focused on locating and treating these undesirable plants with herbicides.

=== Challenges ===
Restoring Florida's most polluted large lake has come with unforeseen problems. An estimated 676 birds died on former farms at Lake Apopka during late 1998 and early 1999. Most were American white pelicans, wood storks and great blue herons. Organochlorine pesticide (OCPs) residues remaining from agricultural practices were primarily the cause of bird deaths. Birds accumulated OCPs by consuming contaminated fish. The District has conducted research to better understand the accumulation of OCPs through the food chain, from contaminated soil to fish, and from fish to fish-eating birds. The knowledge generated guides restoration of the former farmlands at Lake Apopka and is applicable to other projects designed to restore ecosystems impacted by agriculture.

=== Water quality improvements in Lake Apopka ===
Lake Apopka has responded to the reductions in external phosphorus loading from the watershed to the lake with improved lake water quality. Total phosphorus, chlorophyll and Secchi transparency showed improving trends between 1987 and 2010. However, during this 23-year period, three events contributed to a worsening of water quality within a given year. The first coincided with a storm in March 1993. However, the improving trend in water quality resumed the following year. The second occurred in 2001 and 2002 at the end of a severe drought. The lake lost nearly 80 percent of its volume and total phosphorus concentrations increased. However, the improving trend continued the following year. Total phosphorus concentrations between 2004 and 2006 were under 100 ppb and approached the TMDL target of 55 ppb. These long-term improvements persisted despite the hurricanes in 2004 and 2005. The most-recent event was a severe drought in 2007 and 2008, in which the lake lost up to 52 percent of its volume. Total phosphorus concentrations increased sharply at low lake stages, but total phosphorus concentrations declined again in 2009 and continued to decline and water quality continues to improve in 2010. The most recent data (September 2011) indicate that total phosphorus concentrations were 80 ppb (a decrease of 62 percent compared to the baseline period), chlorophyll a was 52 ppb (decrease of 36 percent), and water transparency (Secchi depth) was 37 cm, (increase of 53%).

=== Summary of accomplishments ===
The District's Governing Board approved a rule in 2002 limiting the amount of phosphorus that can be discharged into Lake Apopka or its tributaries as a result of new construction in the lake's watershed. The District has collaborated with local, state and federal agencies to:

- Purchase more than 7,700 hectares (19,000 acres) of agricultural land along the lake's north shore, reducing the discharge of phosphorus from the farms and providing an opportunity to restore the former marshes to wetlands. About 4,000 hectares have been restored to wetlands
- Operate the marsh flow-way. Through 2010, the marsh flow-way has removed about 19 metric tons of total phosphorus and about 32,000 metric tons of total suspended solids from Lake Apopka water
- Harvest gizzard shad. From 1993 through December 2010, removed more than 58 metric tons of phosphorus and 175 metric tons of nitrogen in fish tissue from the lake
- Replant six native wetland species of vegetation in the water along the lake's shoreline, which helps restore fish and wildlife habitat
- Work with the Friends of Lake Apopka and the East Central Florida Regional Planning Council to develop a plan to ensure that future development does not negatively impact the lake

== See also ==
- Lake Apopka Farmworker Memorial Quilts
