= Palm Cottage Gardens =

- U.S. National Register of Historic Places
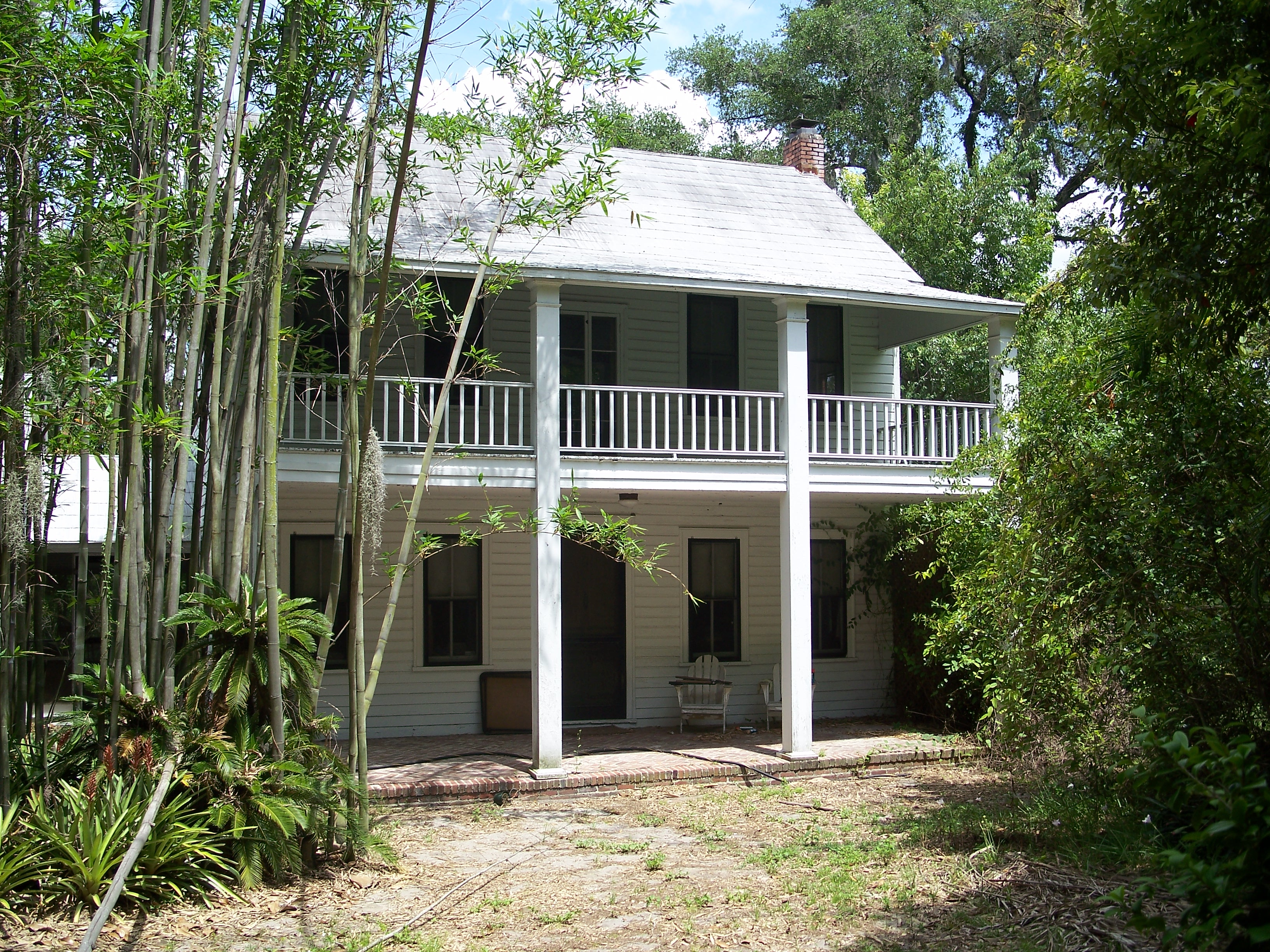
- Palm Cottage Gardens, June 2007

- Location within Florida Location within the United States
- Location: Gotha, Florida
- Coordinates: 28°32′1″N 81°31′20″W
- Built: 1890
- NRHP reference No.: 00000982
- Added to NRHP: November 7, 2000

The Palm Cottage Gardens, also known as the Henry Nehrling Estate, is a historic site in Gotha, Florida, United States. On November 7, 2000, it was added to the U.S. National Register of Historic Places.

== History ==
Palm Cottage Gardens is the former home of famed horticulturalist Dr. Henry Nehrling, who purchased the property in 1885 to establish a garden where he could experiment with tropical and subtropical plants year round. As such, it was Florida's first experimental botanical garden, where Dr. Nehrling tested over 3,000 new and rare plants for the U.S. Department of Agriculture.

By the early 20th century, Palm Cottage Gardens was a popular destination for thousands of tourists, nature lovers, and new Florida settlers. It was visited by many prominent people of the era, such as Theodore Roosevelt, Thomas Edison, Liberty Hyde Bailey, Theodore Luqueer Mead, and Dr. David Fairchild.

Of the 60 plus acres purchased by Henry Nehrling between 1885 and 1897, only the 6-acre homestead site remains; a portion of this extends into Lake Nally. The 1880s frame vernacular style home and semi-detached kitchen were moved by ox-cart to the site in the early 20th century. Remnants of the original 100-year-old tree canopy and many of his plantings still exist.

Between 1885 and 1896, Dr. Henry Nehrling, one of Florida’s pioneer horticulturists and naturalists, purchased 65 acres in central Florida in the newly settled German-American town of Gotha. 25 acres of the best land was selected to develop one of Florida’s first tropical gardens, which he named “Palm Cottage Gardens”. The gardens quickly became a popular tourist destination, attracting thousands of visitors each year. In the early years Nehrling visited his garden annually from his home in Wisconsin, then in 1902 he moved his family to Gotha and at that time moved the 1880s Florida vernacular wood-frame home and semi-detached kitchen/dining wing from its original site a mile away.

In the early 1900s Palm Cottage Gardens became one of Florida's first USDA horticultural experimental stations where Dr. Nehrling tested more than 3000 plants. Over 300 of these became essential to the state's ornamental horticulture, including caladiums, palms, bamboos, magnolias, amaryllis, Indian Hawthorne, and crinum lilies. He had acres of lath shade houses where he grew shade-loving plants such as the caladiums for which he is renowned. His detailed descriptions and observations of tropical and subtropical plants, written for a variety of magazines and scholarly journals, established him as a highly esteemed writer on the early development of ornamental horticulture in Florida.

After Nehrling's death in 1929 the garden lay fallow until Julian Nally purchased the property in 1935. He and his wife Maggie successfully commercialized several species of bamboo and bromeliads, as well as Gloriosa lilies and orchids. They added several greenhouses to the property, which became well known as the Nally Bromeliad and Bamboo Plantation until their deaths in 1977. The property then was purchased and subdivided by developers, who preserved the original home on 6 acres in the middle of the development. The home site suffered from vandalism and many plants were taken.

In 1981 this remaining piece was rescued by Barbara and Howard Bochiardy, who worked to restore the home and gardens and added an architecturally compatible garage and workshop wing. But after Howard's death in 1990 it became increasingly difficult for Barbara to maintain the home and garden.

In 1999, after years of disconnect with the garden's original history, the Henry Nehrling Society was organized as a non-profit corporation with the express mission of saving this important piece of Florida's pioneer history. The property was placed on the National Register of Historic Sites in 2000.

In 2009 the Society succeeded in purchasing the property to preserve the home and remaining historic genome in the gardens, and to create an education center and community resource focusing on historic preservation, horticultural education and environmental conservation.

In 2013 the official Florida Heritage Landmark marker was installed. Today the all-volunteer organization is working hard to rehabilitate Nehrling Gardens and raise the money needed to develop its full potential.

== Gallery ==
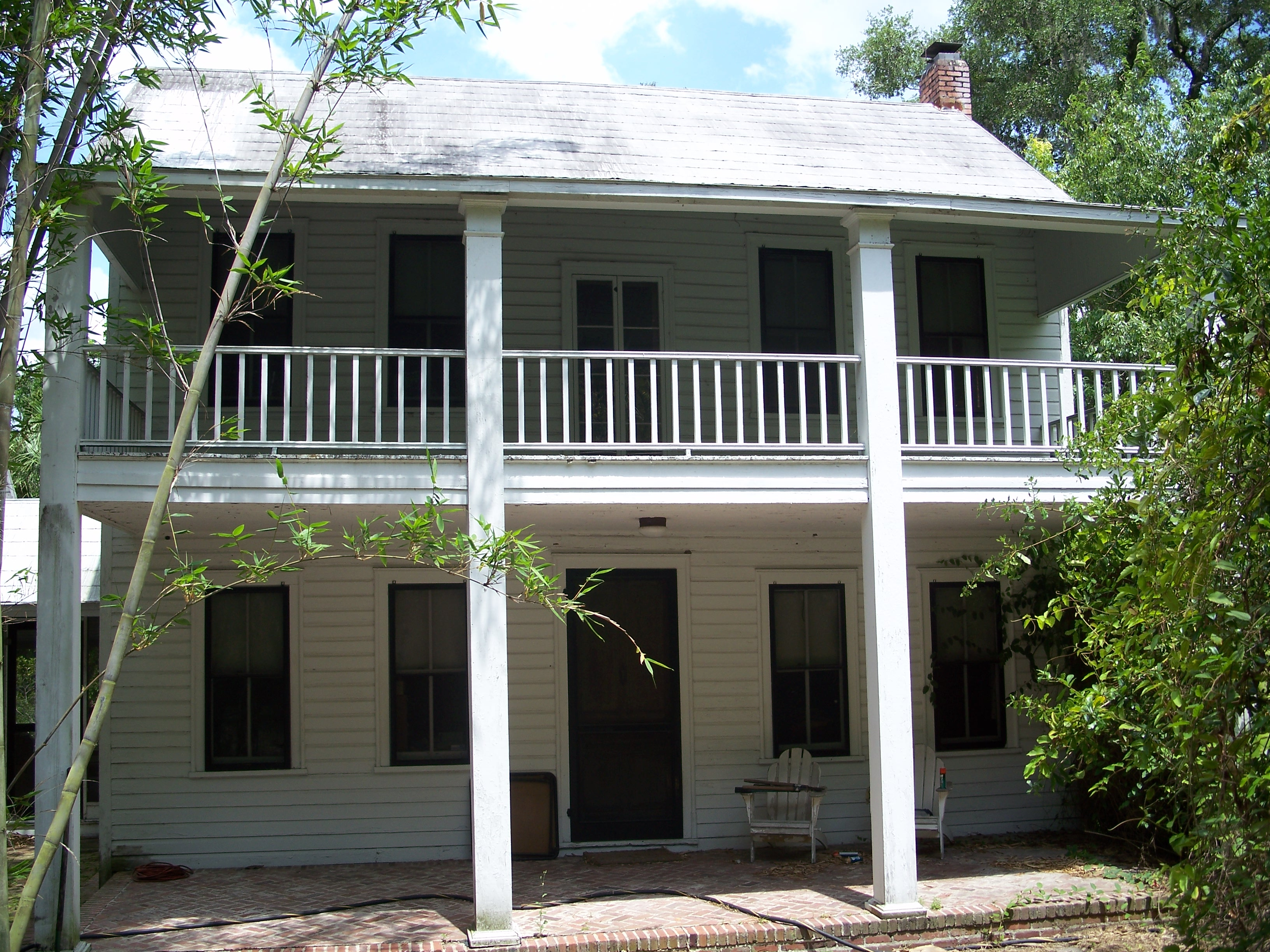

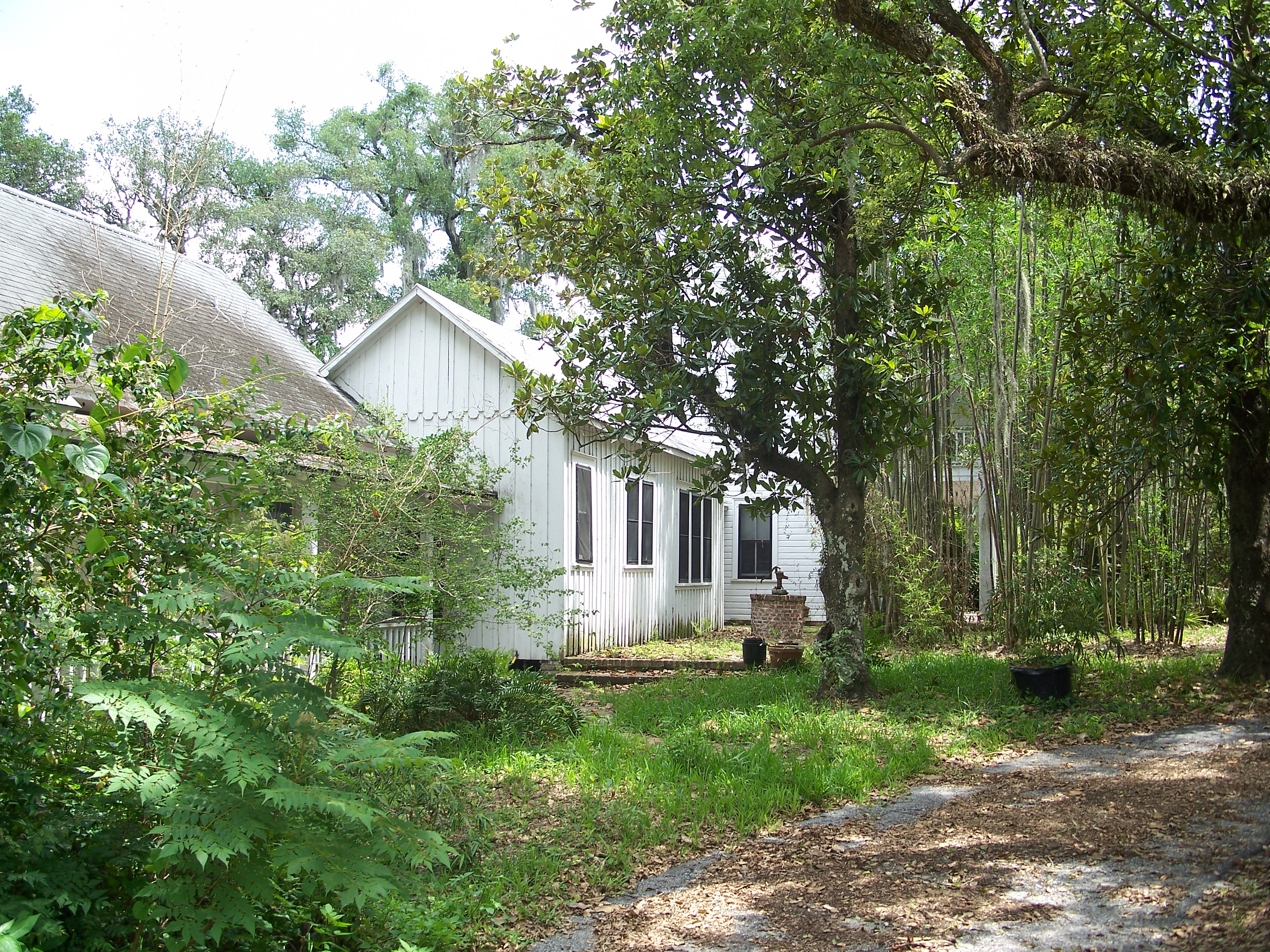

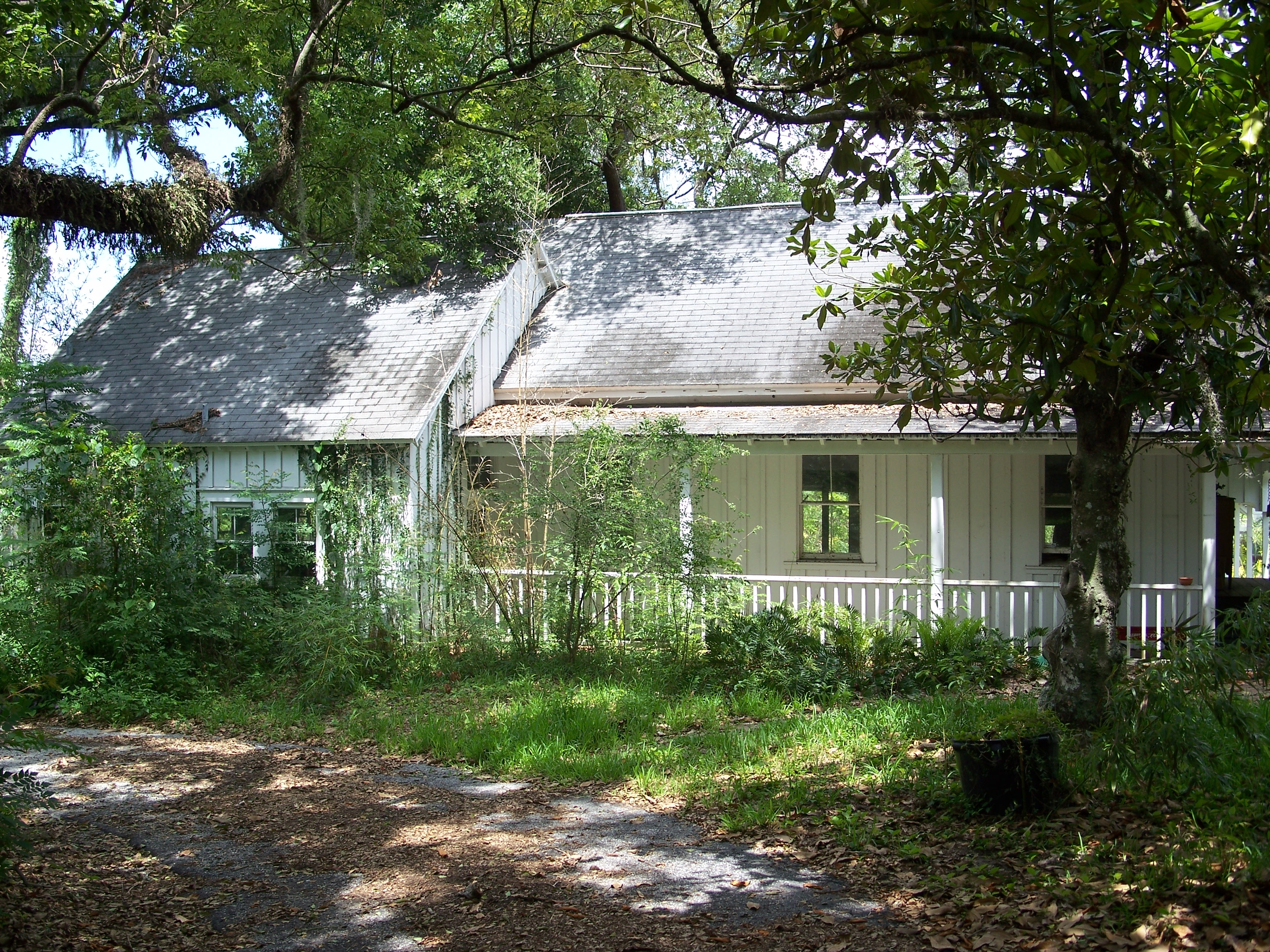

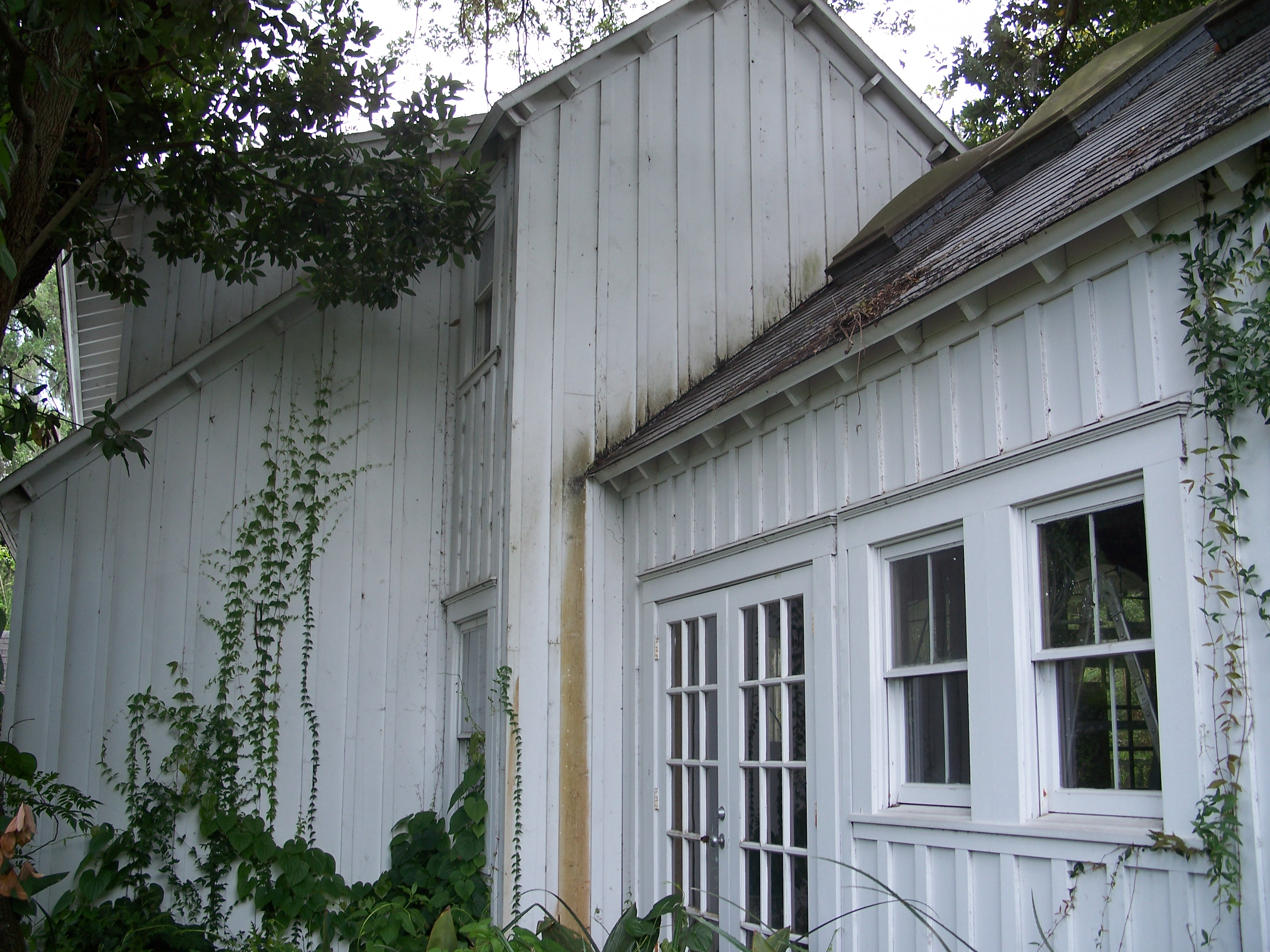

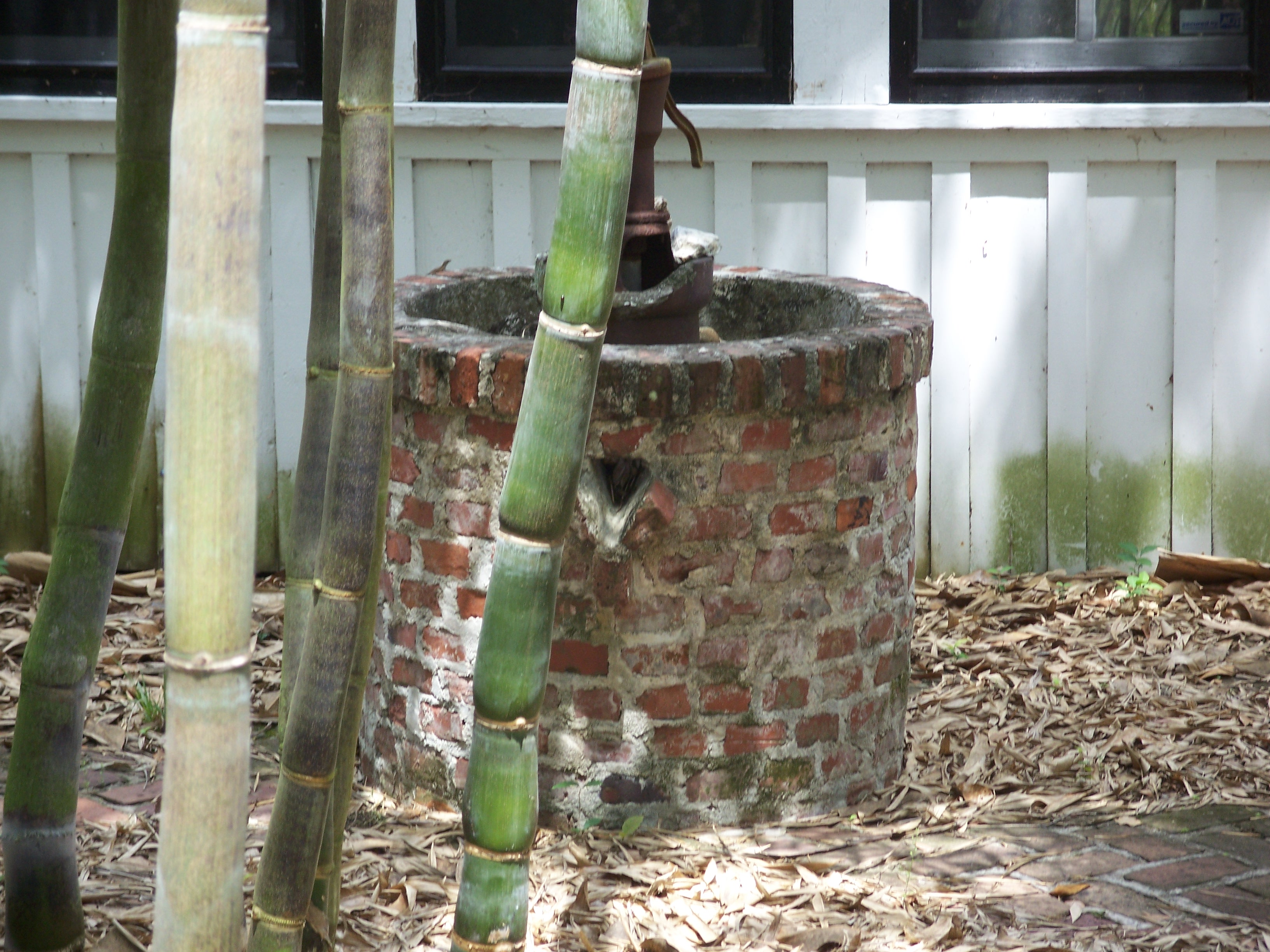
Well outside the main house
