= Dirty (Sevendust song) =

Single by Sevendust

from the album All I See Is War
- Released: March 16, 2018
- Studio: Studio Barbarosa (Gotha, Florida)
- Genre: Alternative metal; hard rock
- Length: 3:18
- Label: Rise
- Songwriters: John Connolly; Vinnie Hornsby; Clint Lowery; Morgan Rose; Lajon Witherspoon
- Producer: Michael "Elvis" Baskette

Sevendust singles chronology
"Death Dance" (2016)	"Dirty" (2018)	"Unforgiven" (2018)

Music video
- "Dirty" on YouTube

"Dirty" is a song by the American rock band Sevendust. It was released on March 16, 2018, as the lead single from the band's twelfth studio album, All I See Is War (2018). The official music video for the song, directed by Caleb Mallery, was released on the same day.

== Charts ==
Chart (2018)	Peak position
US Mainstream Rock (Billboard)	17
