= Unforgiven (Sevendust song) =

Single by Sevendust

from the album All I See Is War
- Released: August 28, 2018
- Studio: Studio Barbarosa (Gotha, Florida)
- Genre: Alternative metal
- Length: 3:55
- Label: Rise
- Songwriters: Clint Lowery; Morgan Rose
- Producer: Michael "Elvis" Baskette

Sevendust singles chronology
"Dirty" (2018)	"Unforgiven" (2018)	"Risen" (2019)

Music video
- "Unforgiven" on YouTube

"Unforgiven" is a song by the American rock band Sevendust. It was released on August 28, 2018, by Rise Records, as the second single from their twelfth studio album, All I See Is War (2018).

== Charts ==
Chart (2018)	Peak position
US Mainstream Rock (Billboard)	32
