= Risen (song) =

Single by Sevendust

from the album All I See Is War
- Released: January 23, 2019
- Studio: Studio Barbarosa (Gotha, Florida)
- Genre: Alternative metal
- Length: 3:26
- Label: Rise
- Songwriters: Lajon Witherspoon; Clint Lowery; John Connolly; Vinnie Hornsby; Morgan Rose
- Producer: Michael "Elvis" Baskette

Sevendust singles chronology
"Unforgiven" (2018)	"Risen" (2019)	"The Day I Tried to Live" (2020)

Music video
- "Risen" on YouTube

"Risen" is a song by the American rock band Sevendust. It was released as the third and last single from their twelfth studio album, All I See Is War (2018).

The music video, released on January 23, 2019, was filmed during a concert at the Brixton Academy on December 2, 2018.

Critics have identified "Risen" as the "heaviest" and "most brutal" song of the album.

== Charts ==
Chart (2019)	Peak position
US Mainstream Rock (Billboard)	33
