= All I See Is War =

Studio album by Sevendust
- Released: May 11, 2018
- Recorded: Late 2017 – early 2018
- Studio: Studio Barbarosa in Gotha, Florida, U.S.
- Genre: Alternative metal; hard rock
- Length: 45:35
- Label: Rise
- Producer: Michael "Elvis" Baskette

Sevendust chronology
| Kill the Flaw (2015) | All I See Is War (2018) | Blood & Stone (2020) |

Singles from All I See Is War
- 1. "Dirty" Released: March 16, 2018; 2. "Unforgiven" Released: August 28, 2018; 3. "Risen" Released: January 23, 2019

All I See Is War is the twelfth studio album by the American rock band Sevendust. It was released on May 11, 2018. Three songs were showcased from the album ahead of its full release; the first single, "Dirty", along with two other promotional songs, "Not Original", and "Medicated". "Unforgiven" and "Risen" followed as further singles.

== Writing and recording ==
The band wrote far more potential songs for the album; while they usually write around 30 songs to select from when compiling a track list of an album, for All I See is War, the band wrote between 50 and 60 songs. Recording for the album began in the second half of 2017. The band chose to work with music producer Michael "Elvis" Baskette on the album, their first time working with an outside producer in a number of albums, where they had opted to self-produce or work band collaborator and sound engineer Mike Ferretti. They chose Baskette in an effort to "reboot" the band's sound, knowing that he was very particular in scrutinizing every little detail of the music he produced. The band liked him for his work producing music for Stone Temple Pilots and Incubus, while Baskette had been a fan of Sevendust since their 1999 album Home; he hoped to help the band recreate the "impact" of the sound created on Home.

== Themes and composition ==
"Dirty" was described as having a traditional Sevendust sound, featuring "heavy" guitarwork and melodic and emotional vocals by Lajon Witherspoon. Contrary to that, the track "Not Original" was noted as being softer than most of their work, described as a ballad. In addition, the song is inspired by Netflix's Stranger Things. "We wanted to get into some new territory," explains Clint Lowery. "It's about being in a dry spell and not able to find creativity. You don't want to repeat yourself. I thought I'd go for this new wave thing, because I was watching a lot of Stranger Things."

== Album title ==
Lowery explained the meaning behind the album title in an interview with The Daily Times:

"The title was basically a lyric in the song 'Dirty,' and it started from there, addressing that there is an element you see around the world with the actual wars and conflicts going on, but there's also this conflict we've had with the industry. It's just observational stuff of the struggles we've had and the things we've encountered. The word 'war' shows up in a lot of the lyrics on this album, and it just summed up the basic energy. 'War' has been a very huge presence in our careers and our lifetimes, as it pertains to those internal conflicts and relationship conflicts and business conflicts."

== Release and promotion ==
The album was released through Rise Records on May 11, 2018. The band began touring in support of the album prior to its release, which was extended until at least June of the same year. The first single from the album, "Dirty", was released ahead of the album on March 16, 2018. A second song, "Not Original", was also released on April 6, 2018. Both songs contained similar music videos, featuring the band playing in dark locations with futuristic electronic effects appearing around them. On May 11, The band later released another music video for the song "Medicated", directed by Caleb Mallery who has previously worked on the first two music videos of this album. Sevendust made the entire album available for streaming on YouTube.

== Critical reception ==
Professional ratings
Review scores
| Source | Rating |
|---|---|
| AllMusic | 3.5/5 stars |
| Blabbermouth | 7/10 stars |
| The Washington Post | (favorable) |
| Ultimate Guitar | 7.3/10 |

AllMusic praised the album for being what they described as a "late-era evolution" created in working with Baskette as a producer, describing the album as having a " a mature perspective, tighter delivery, and polished production" in its sound and concluding that it " extends Sevendust's maturation with skill and conviction, at once comforting in its familiarity and fresh enough to hint at more to come." The Washington Post generally agreed with the sentiment, comparing the album to Foo Fighter's late career album Concrete and Gold, describing the album as "polished, heavy and melodic...It's not a revolution — more like another step in the band's movement toward a cleaner, polished sound." "Not Original" was noted by multiple reviewers as a standout track.

== Track listing ==
All tracks are written by Sevendust

| No. | Title | Length |
|---|---|---|
| 1. | "Dirty" | 3:18 |
| 2. | "God Bites His Tongue" | 3:45 |
| 3. | "Medicated" | 3:29 |
| 4. | "Unforgiven" | 3:55 |
| 5. | "Sickness" | 3:07 |
| 6. | "Cheers" | 3:47 |
| 7. | "Risen" | 3:26 |
| 8. | "Moments" | 4:02 |
| 9. | "Not Original" | 4:15 |
| 10. | "Descend" | 4:24 |
| 11. | "Life Deceives You" | 4:26 |
| 12. | "The Truth" | 3:41 |
| Total length: | | 45:35 |

== Personnel ==
=== Sevendust ===
- Lajon Witherspoon – lead vocals
- Clint Lowery – lead guitar, backing vocals
- John Connolly – rhythm guitar, backing vocals
- Vinnie Hornsby – bass, backing vocals
- Morgan Rose – drums, backing vocals

=== Production and design ===
- Michael "Elvis" Baskette – production, mixing
- Brad Blackwood – mastering
- Jef Moll – digital editing, engineering
- Alan Ashcraft – art direction, design
- Travis Shinn – photography

== Charts ==
| Chart (2018) | Peak position |
|---|---|
| Australian Albums (ARIA) | 92 |
| Swiss Albums (Schweizer Hitparade) | 59 |
| UK Rock & Metal Albums (OCC) | 12 |
| US Billboard 200 | 28 |
