= Theodore Luqueer Mead =

American naturalist and horticulturist

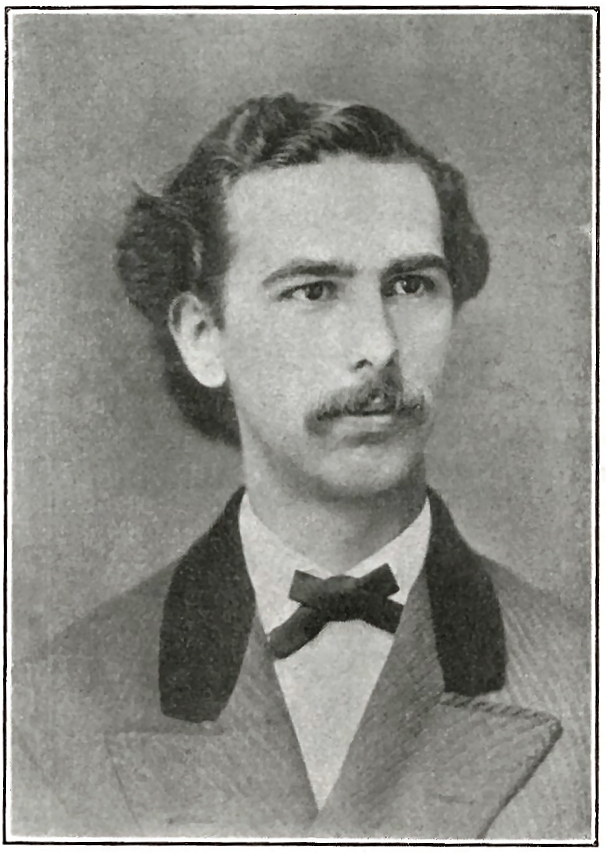
- Mead as a young man, aged 22, taken in 1874
- Born: February 23, 1852
- Died: May 4, 1936 (aged 84)
- Resting place: Greenwood cemetery, Orlando
- Monuments: Mead Botanical Garden
- Citizenship: United States
- Education: Cornell University
- Occupations: naturalist, entomologist and horticulturist
- Known for: 1. Butterflies - Mead’s Sulphur, Mead’s Silverspot, Mead’s Wood-Nymph.; 2. Entomology - Discoverer of Florissant Fossil Beds.; 3. Horticulture - Orchids: Cattleya Meadii & Oviedo; Bromeliads: Billbergia Theodore L. Mead, xCryptbergia Mead; Caladium: Arrow and Lance Hybrids; Crinum: Kirkcape & Peachblow; Amaryllis: Mead-strain Hybrids; Daylily: Chrome Orange.
- Spouse: Edith Katharine Antill Edwards
- Children: Dorothy Luqueer Mead
- Parent(s): Samuel H. and Mary C. Mead

Theodore Luqueer Mead (February 23, 1852 – May 4, 1936) was an American naturalist, entomologist and horticulturist. As an entomologist he discovered more than 20 new species of North American butterflies and introduced the Florissant Fossil Beds in Colorado to the wider scientific world. As a horticulturist, he is best known for his pioneering work on the growing and crossbreeding of orchids, and the creation of new forms of caladium, bromeliad, crinum, amaryllis and hemerocallis (daylily). In addition, he introduced many new semi-tropical plants, particularly palm varieties, into North America. A biography of his life and times was published in 2017.

== Early life and schooling ==
The Mead family was originally from England; his mother (née Luqueer), a descendant of Dutch Huguenots. Mead was born at Fishkill, New York to Samuel H. Mead and Mary C. Mead and was the grandson of Ralph Mead, a well-known New York wholesale grocer, who in 1838 had built and lived in the Second Avenue Manhattan house, now referred to as the Isaac T. Hopper House. Schooled in America and in Europe, where he learned French and German and studied the classics, he developed a deep interest in natural sciences from an early age that was strongly encouraged by his parents.

== Butterfly years ==
His first interest was in butterflies, and as a youth he apprenticed under the guiding influence of William Henry Edwards, author of the monumental five volume standard text at that time, “The Butterflies of North America”. In 1871, Edwards suggested that Mead, aged 19, take a trip to Colorado with the task of exploring and discovering new butterfly species in the Colorado Rockies.

Over 20 species new to science were collected by Mead on this trip, and three named by Edwards in his honor still carry his name: Colias meadii (Mead's Sulphur), Speyeria callippe meadii (Mead's Silverspot) and Cercyonis meadii (Mead's Wood-Nymph).

Mead's butterfly knowledge and expertise grew to such an extent that he was given the job of collating the butterfly discoveries from all the Wheeler Survey expeditions in Colorado, Utah, New Mexico and Arizona from 1871 to 1874 and submitting the results as part of the final report to the United States Government.

== Discovery of Florissant fossil beds ==
At the end of his collecting time in Colorado, in September 1871, he heard tell of a strange petrified forest and rock formation at Florissant and went there on horseback to investigate. Realizing the scientific importance of the site, he collected 25 lbs. of compressive shale fossil rocks containing insects and leaves and sent these via Edwards to Samuel Hubbard Scudder, a Harvard University paleontologist, whose publications and lectures after analyzing the fossils alerted the rest of the scientific community to this important site, now the Florissant Fossil Beds National Monument.

== University years ==
Mead attended Cornell University as a freshman in 1874 and graduated in Civil Engineering in 1877. In this year he sold his extensive butterfly collection to the Carnegie Museum of Natural History in Pittsburgh and turned his attention to horticulture. He continued to work at Cornell after graduation doing research in natural history, which quickly became his passion. Mead was active in the Alpha Delta Phi fraternity at Cornell and a major driver in the construction of the first dedicated chapter house for the fraternity. He counted fellow student and fraternity brother Louis Agassiz Fuertes, the famous bird artist, among his closest friends.

Still uncertain as to his future vocation, in 1878 Mead and his parents embarked on a six-month long entomological and nature trip to California and the Western States, travelling by steamer from New York via Panama and up the coast to San Francisco, returning via Salt Lake City and Chicago. Epiphytes, cacti and several new species of butterflies were collected including one he named, Gaeides editha (Edith's Copper), after Edward's eldest daughter Edith, whom he later married in 1882.

== Horticulture in Florida ==
Mead had first visited Florida in 1869 on a butterfly collecting trip, where he had successfully captured his rarest specimen near Enterprise - a female of Papilio calverleyi; only one other specimen of that type had ever been found before. He considered the climate there ideal for the growing of semi-tropical plants, so after marriage he moved to Eustis, Florida where his father had bought him an orange grove and land to develop and grow other plants. Income would come from citrus and the growing of other cash crops such as pineapples, leaving time for his experiments in horticulture. In 1886, he purchased eighty-five acres in Oviedo, Florida, close to Lake Charm where orange grove land was more fertile, choosing a location next to Edith's aunt Mary. She had previously married Dr. Henry Foster owner of the Clifton Springs Sanitarium in New York State, and the couple were winter visitors to the Lake Charm area.

At Lake Charm Mead grew many palms from seed and hybridized orchids, bromeliads, crinum and later, caladium, amaryllis and daylilies. He established a strong friendship with Henry Nehrling of Gotha, Florida with whom he collaborated on many plant experiments.

Citrus in central Florida did well until the Great Freeze of 1894–5. Many growers abandoned their groves entirely, but Mead recognized that below ground artesian water at a constant 70 degrees might provide relief from frost and allow citrus trees to survive freezing temperatures. His engineering background led him to postulate that overhead water irrigation of the trees hanging with fruit could keep the fruit protected from damage at 32° within an ice cocoon regardless of how low the mercury fell. He successfully covered an acre of oranges, installed a pump and irrigation system, and proved the concept, the first known description of a technique still used today.

== Crossbreeding experiments and achievements ==
Mead's approach to hybridization was to strive to create new types of plants of sufficient novelty or improved characteristics to make them worthy of commercial introduction, whether or not the hybridization was difficult, as for orchids, or easy, as for daylilies. In this work, he applied a rigorous scientific approach coupled with meticulous record-keeping. He did not seek publicity for his efforts, and according to Henry Nehrling, was a more accomplished hybridizer of plants than Luther Burbank.

=== Orchids ===
At that time orchid seed germination was traditionally a hit or miss affair, and the single biggest factor preventing orchid growing from moving from being a rich-man's hobby to a business where money could be made. Irregular and irreproducible germination seriously hampered the speed and success rate of Mead's hybridization efforts, and it was not uncommon for him to have to wait 10 or more years before a new orchid bloomed for the first time, in one instance taking 17 years. But Mead was a patient man, employing scientific principles and keeping detailed and careful notes. His horticultural notebook in the Michael A. Spencer Collection on Theodore Mead, Special Collections and University Archives, University of Central Florida, lists several thousand crosses as well as information on all his other plants. In addition, he photographed many of his new creations.

He was a frequent contributor to The Orchid Review, a journal of the Royal Horticultural Society who also maintain The International Orchid Register and wrote about a number of crosses to the journal. In 1904 he reported Cattleya bowringiana x Cattleya forbesii and Cattleya maxima x Cattleya schilleriana as germinating in January 1894 and blooming in January 1904. These two hybrids were added to the register in 1904 as officially originated by Mead, and named in recognition Cattleya Meadii and Cattleya Oviedo, respectively. The Singapore 30c stamp from 1991 carries an illustration of Cattleya Meadii.

Mead's biggest contribution to orchidology, after over 25 years of orchid growing, came when Lewis Knudson of Cornell University approached him for advice and assistance in experiments, he was performing related to the possible non-symbiotic germination of orchid seed. By then Mead had realized that germination rates could be made more favorable in a sterile and temperature-controlled environment akin to clean room conditions in a laboratory. Knudson's breakthrough involved the use of sterilized agar containing nutrients to achieve reproducible orchid seed germination. It has been stated as being doubtful whether Knudson would have been successful without Mead's inputs and donation of viable ripe orchid seeds, so arguably he should have been credited as a co-discoverer. Improved versions of Knudson's solution are used today for orchid seed germination, and the accomplishment was the catalyst for the emergence of the orchid industry as we know it today.

=== Bromeliads ===
In the 1920s he was the first American to hybridize bromeliads and introduced many new representatives of several bromeliad genera, such as Aechmea, Ananas, Billbergia, Crypthansus, Guzmania, Hohenbergia, Nidalarium, and Tillandsia. He hybridized the billbergia genera extensively and sent his hybrids to the Brooklyn Botanic Garden, to Nehrling and to many other growers. For many years Mead exchanged seeds and plants with E.O. Orpet and he introduced into California Billbergia xmeadii (a cross between Billbergia nutans and Billbergia porteana, sometimes also referred to as Billbergia 'Theodore L. Mead'), which became one of the favorite billbergias of western growers. Mead became the first person to create a bromeliad intergeneric cross, selecting cryptanthus beuckeri and crossing it with pollen from one of his favourites, billbergia nutans, to produce the first cryptbergia, xCryptbergia Mead.

=== Crinum ===
Mead was always fascinated by bulbous plants and the magnificence of floral displays from their cut flowers. Sometime around 1890, he obtained a large and extensive collection of around 80 crinum species from an English collector in India and set about hybridizing them, producing the hybrids Crinum Kircape around 1894, a cross of C. Kirkii a species from Zanzibar, and C. Capense from South Africa, and Peachblow around 1900, a plant with tall stems and huge, pink-white, scented blooms.

=== Caladium ===
Both Mead and Nehrling hybridized caladiums and created dozens of new and highly colored fancy-leaved cultivars; Nehrling growing them commercially in their tens of thousands. Mead favored hybridizing the unusual and in 1920 he crossed the narrow-leaved species, C. albanense, C. speciosum and C. venosum, with the standard caladium varieties to create the “arrow and lance” type caladium, bringing intriguing narrow strap-leaves and dwarf growth habits to a race of caladium that still possessed the high coloration and patterns of the larger fancy-leaved forms.

=== Amaryllis ===
With orchid crossing coming to an end, Mead devoted more and more attention of the breeding of amaryllis (hippeastrum), being greatly helped by Nehrling, who had a fine collection and allowed Mead to take what he wanted in the way of pollen for his experiments. Specimens with just a hair line color around each petal were intercrossed to produce nearly white varieties with a narrow border around each petal. His hybrid red and white striped ‘Mead-strain’ amaryllis also became the bulb of choice for many American southern gardens in the 1940s and 1950s.

The American Amaryllis Society's yearbook for 1935 was dedicated to Mead in recognition of his pioneer work with hybrid amaryllis plants, and in 1937 the International Bulb Society awarded Mead The Herbert Medal for his contributions in advancing the knowledge of bulbous plants.

=== Hemerocallis (Daylily) ===
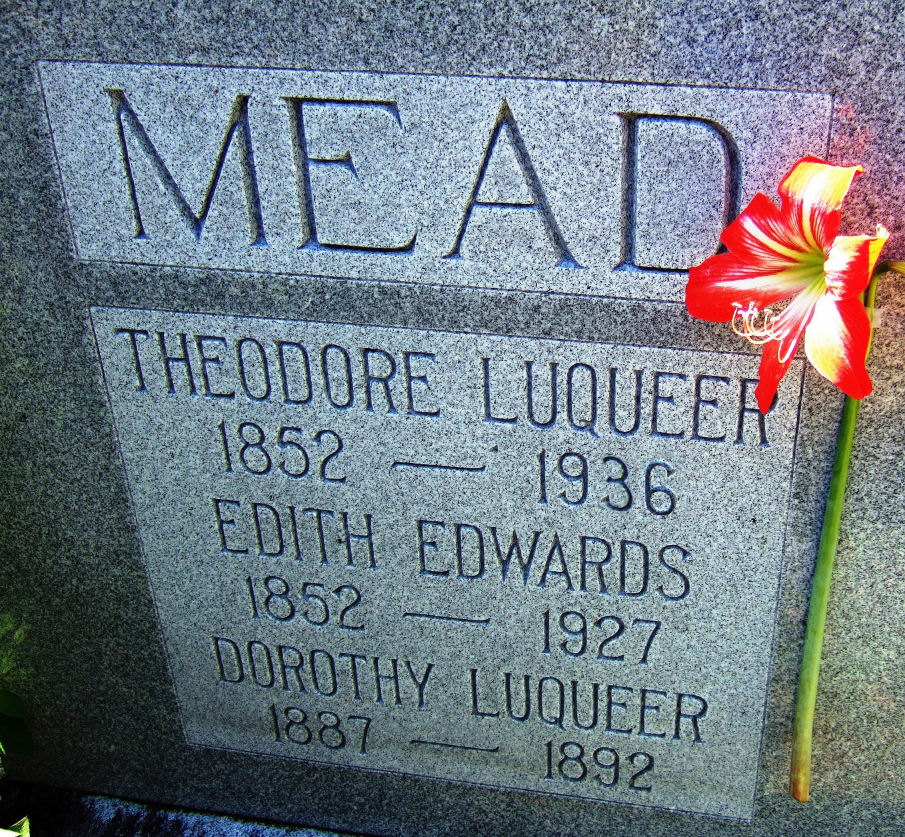
The Mead family grave in Greenwood cemetery, Orlando, lies beneath a tall pine tree where eagles nest each year

Mead was an early hybridizer of the daylily and many crosses were made during the 20s and 30s. Only one however, “Chrome Orange” registered in 1933, did he consider sufficiently novel and of outstanding color for commercial introduction.

== Personal life ==
Mead married Edith Katharine Antill Edwards at Coalburg, West Virginia in 1882. Their only child, Dorothy Luqueer Mead, was lost to scarlet fever, aged 4, in 1892.

Mead's eldest brother, Samuel H. Mead Jr, died of an accidental self-inflicted gunshot wound to the head in New York City in 1875, aged 27.

Theodore Mead died on May 4, 1936, and is buried in Greenwood cemetery, Orlando.

== Legacy ==
Mead Botanical Garden, opened in Winter Park, Florida in 1940, is dedicated to his memory.

Billbergia 'Theodore L. Mead', a hybrid cultivar of the genus Billbergia, was named for Mead in honor of his work hybridising the genus.
