= Death Dance =

Single by Sevendust

from the album Kill the Flaw
- Released: March 22, 2016
- Studio: Architekt Music (Butler, New Jersey)
- Length: 3:39
- Label: 7Bros.
- Songwriters: John Connolly; Vinnie Hornsby; Clint Lowery; Morgan Rose; Lajon Witherspoon
- Producer: Sevendust

Sevendust singles chronology
"Thank You" (2015)	"Death Dance" (2016)	"Dirty" (2018)

"Death Dance" is a song by American rock band Sevendust. It was released as the second single from their eleventh studio album, Kill the Flaw (2015). The single was released to digital music outlets on March 22, 2016. It peaked at No. 29 on Billboard's Mainstream Rock chart.

== Personnel ==
- Lajon Witherspoon – lead vocals
- Clint Lowery – lead guitar, backing vocals
- John Connolly – rhythm guitar, backing vocals
- Vinnie Hornsby – bass
- Morgan Rose – drums, backing vocals

== Charts ==
Chart (2016)	Peak position
US Mainstream Rock (Billboard)	29
