= Naples Zoo =

Zoo in Naples, Florida, USA

Naples Zoo at Caribbean Gardens

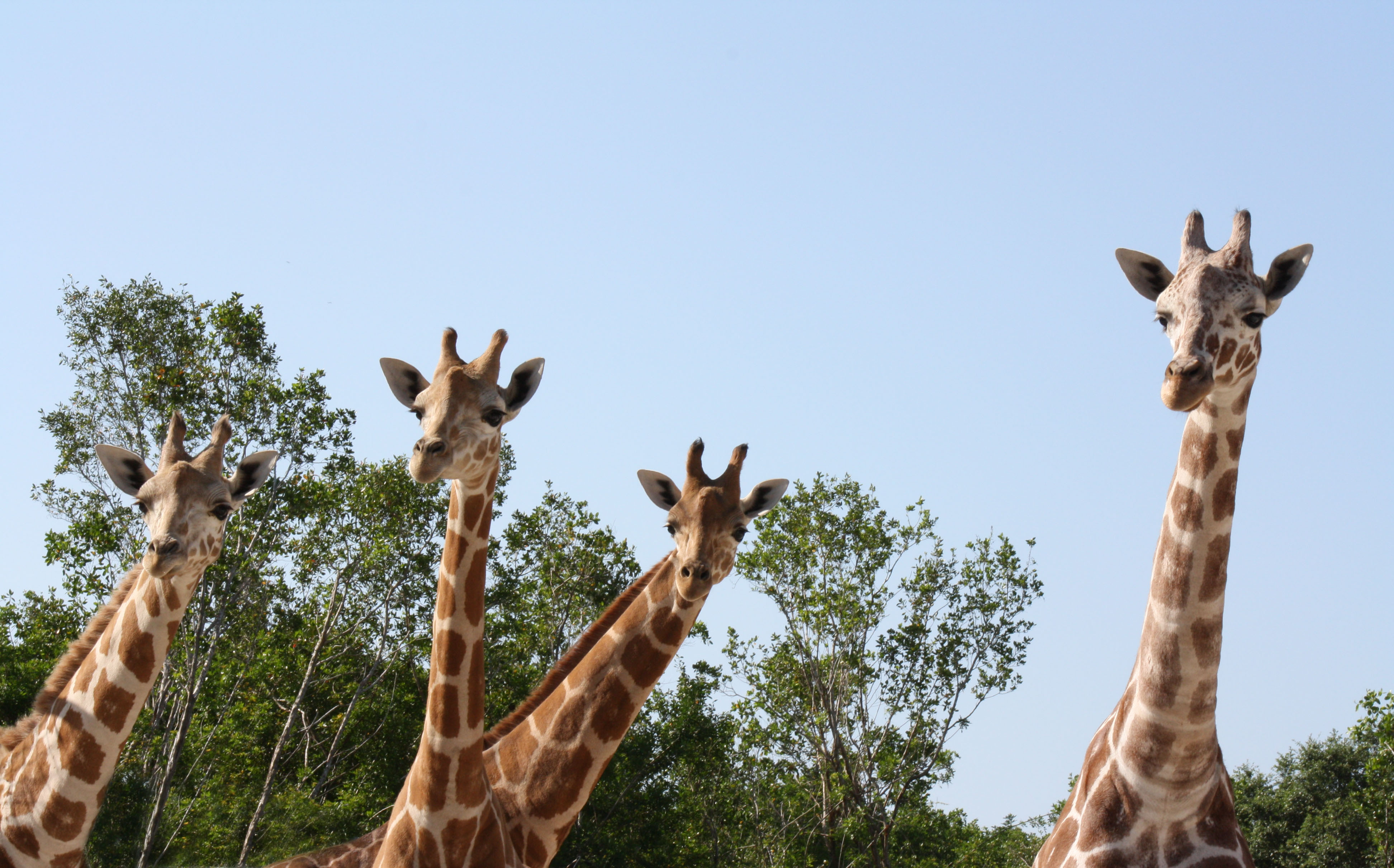
- Giraffes at Naples Zoo
- Interactive map of Naples Zoo at Caribbean Gardens
- 26.168207°N 81.790681°W
- Date opened: September 1, 1969
- Location: Naples, Florida, United States
- Land area: 43 acres (17 ha)
- No. of species: 70
- Memberships: AZA, AAZK American Public Gardens Association,
- Director: Jack Mulvena
- Website: napleszoo.org

The Naples Zoo (or more formally, Naples Zoo at Caribbean Gardens) is a 43-acre zoo and historic botanical garden in Naples, Florida, United States. The first plantings were made by botanist and ornithologist Henry Nehrling in 1919; the gardens were neglected after his death in 1929. In the 1950s, Julius Fleischmann added new plantings, created lakes and a pathway, introduced parrots and waterfowl, and opened as Caribbean Gardens in 1954. After his death in 1968, the exotic animals were introduced in 1969 by Larry and Jane Tetzlaff, aka Jungle Larry and Safari Jane.

The zoo holds about 70 species, though not all of these are on display at any given time. The main path is about a mile long, and winds past the main animal exhibits through the tropical garden first planted in 1919. Primates in the zoo are housed on islands in one of the lakes created by Fleischmann, and can be viewed from guided catamarans when visitors take the Primate Expedition Cruise.

The zoo is nationally accredited by the Association of Zoos and Aquariums (AZA), and is an institutional member of the American Association of Zoo Keepers (AAZK). The garden itself is accredited by The Moreton Register of Arboreta and is a member of the American Public Garden Association and the Association of Zoological Horticulture. It is also a designated historic site by Collier County.

== History ==
The Naples Zoo began as a personal project of botanist Henry Nehrling, who purchased the land in 1919 to protect his plant collection, which had taken heavy damage during a 1917 freeze at his original garden in central Florida. After his death in 1929, the gardens were neglected for over two decades. They were reopened in 1954, this time to the public and as "Caribbean Gardens," by Julius Fleischmann, Jr. At the time they were described as being "just north of Naples."

The conversion to a zoo started in 1967, when Col. Lawrence and Nancy Jane Tetzlaff, known as Jungle Larry and Safari Jane, visited the Gardens while looking for somewhere to house their collection of rare animals during the winter. Although the property was not available at the time, shortly after Fleischmann's death the Tetzlaffs were contacted about displaying their animals within the garden, and it was opened with the animals in place on September 1, 1969.

Although Larry Tetzlaff died in 1984, Nancy Jane Tetzlaff and her family carried on and continued to improve and expand the Zoo and gardens. The zoo was accredited by the Association of Zoos and Aquariums (AZA) in 2001. In 2002, the Fleischmann family that owned the land at the time decided that they wanted to sell it. The Tetzlaffs began trying to get the county to purchase the land, and the Fleischmann family waited to allow the community to act. In 2004, a referendum to purchase the land was approved by 73% of voters. In order to make the purchase easier, the Tetzlaffs made the Zoo a 501(c)(3) charitable organization and gave control to the newly established Naples Zoo Board of Directors in 2005.

Today, under the leadership of President and CEO Jack Mulvena, the zoo cares for a growing number of critically endangered species, supports conservation efforts in the wild, and reaches over 350,000 guests a year.

== Exhibits ==
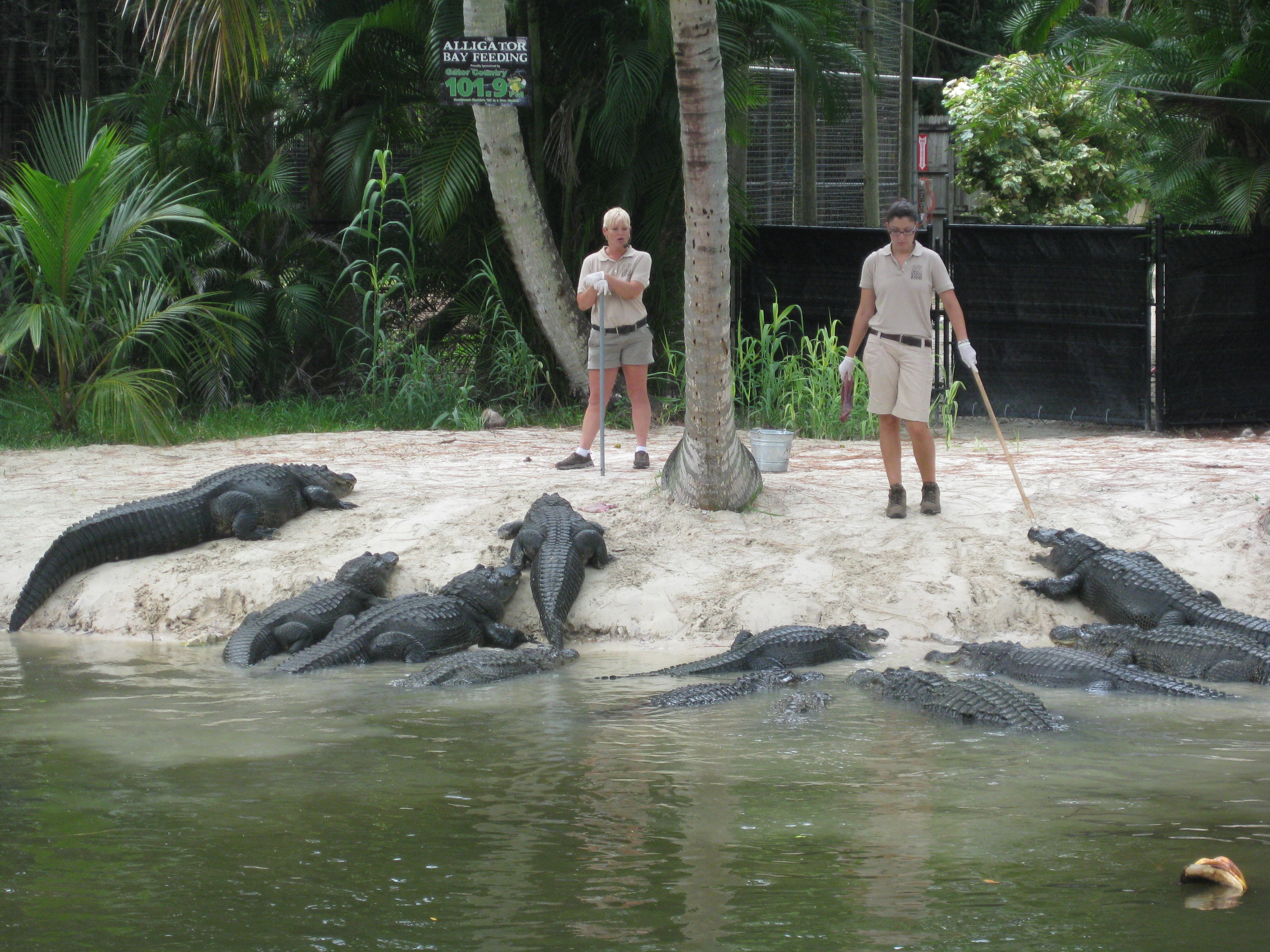
Alligator Bay

The Naples Zoo is laid out with one major loop about 1 mile long that winds through the botanical gardens past the main exhibits. The main exhibits, going clockwise around the main loop, include the following:

Alligator Bay provides a home to the zoo's American alligators. This lake is also home to many native species including an annual rookery of herons.

South American Exhibits This area features a giant anteater as well as red-rumped agoutis. Nearby are critically endangered cotton-top tamarins, red-footed tortoises, Linnaeus's two-toed sloths.

African Antelope is on the South side of the path opposite Alligator Bay. This area is home to a breeding pair of mountain bongo, a critically endangered antelope from the Mount Kenya area. Only 75 to 80 remain in the wild. Guests also see slender-horned gazelles. These light colored animals come from northern Africa where only 250 to 340 remain.

Clouded Leopards has a breeding pair of clouded leopards. There is glass viewing and a nearby educational display offers guests information on how their purchases of snacks, cosmetics, and other household items can help or hurt clouded leopards, orangutans, tigers, and more. Guests can download a free app that shows them which products are better for these endangered species.

Lake Victoria contains several islands that are home to the zoo's primates, including ring-tailed lemurs, red ruffed lemurs, collared lemurs, black-handed spider monkeys, buff-cheeked gibbons, siamangs and eastern black-and-white colobuses. Visitors can see these islands can be viewed up close by taking the 15 to 20 minute Primate Expedition Cruise around the lake on one of the zoo's catamarans. The majority of the species on these islands are endangered in the wild.

Lagoon Loop is home to the zoo's lions as well as nearby plains zebras.

Giraffes showcases a herd of reticulated giraffes, where guests can hand-feed them for a fee.

Fosas of Madagascar is home to this rare carnivore from Madagascar. (It is still commonly spelled fossas, although the preferred spelling is fosa with a single S to prevent confusion with another Malagasy civet whose scientific name is Fossa fossana.)

Black Bear Hammock is home to American black bears, and consists of two separate habitats: one that simulates a natural environment and one that simulates a back yard. Viewing for both areas is from behind glass. It is the largest black bear exhibit in an accredited zoo east of the Mississippi River.

Tiger Forest provides a naturalistic bamboo forest habitat for the zoo's Malayan tigers. The Naples Zoo is a participating member of the AZA Species Survival Plan for this species.

Backyard Habitat is a section of the gardens set aside and certified by the National Wildlife Federation in their Backyard Wildlife Habitat (BWH) program. It includes a pool where visitors can feed the fish.

Panther exhibit is home to Athena, a Florida panther. She was found in Big Cypress National Preserve after being left behind by her mother. After attempts to reunite the kitten with her mother failed, she was brought to Naples Zoo at less than a month old. She regained her health and can be seen daily. As panthers need to spend at least 6 months with their mother to learn how to survive, she cannot be returned to the wild.

The panther exhibit had originally been home to Uno, another florida panther, until his death in 2018. The big cat was found after having been shot between the eyes at close range and left for dead. He survived the ordeal by dining on road kill. After being nursed back to health he was brought to the zoo and put on exhibit in a recreation of what would be his local mostly wild habitat (mostly wetlands).

There are also other exhibits throughout the zoo for striped hyenas, Reeve's muntjac, yellow-backed duikers, honey badgers, cheetahs, coyotes and macaws.

== Daily Events ==
Throughout the day, the zoo provides visitors with events that highlight the animals and conservation. These include the Seated Safari and Reptile Rendezvous shows at the Safari Canyon Open Air Theater, Alligator Bay Feeding, and Meet the Keeper series at various exhibits around the zoo.

== Incidents ==
On December 29, 2021, River Rosenquist, an employee with a third-party cleaning service working at the zoo was bitten by an 8-year-old Malayan tiger after he entered an unauthorized area and reached his arm into the animal's enclosure. A responding law enforcement officer shot the tiger, named Eko, in an effort to force its release of the victim's arm, wounding the tiger who later died.
