= Henry Nehrling =

American ornithologist

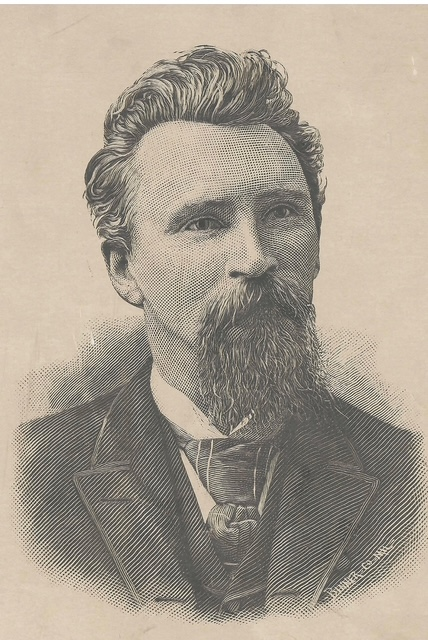
- Portrait of Henry Nehrling c. 1880s
- Born: May 9, 1853; Herman, Sheboygan County, Wisconsin, U.S.
- Died: November 22, 1929 (aged 76); Gotha, Orange County, Florida, U.S.
- Occupations: Ornithologist; horticulturist; customs inspector; teacher
- Known for: Creating two of Florida's earliest experimental plant introduction gardens.
- Spouse(s): Sophie Schoff (m. 1874; died 1911) Betty Mitchell (m. 1916)

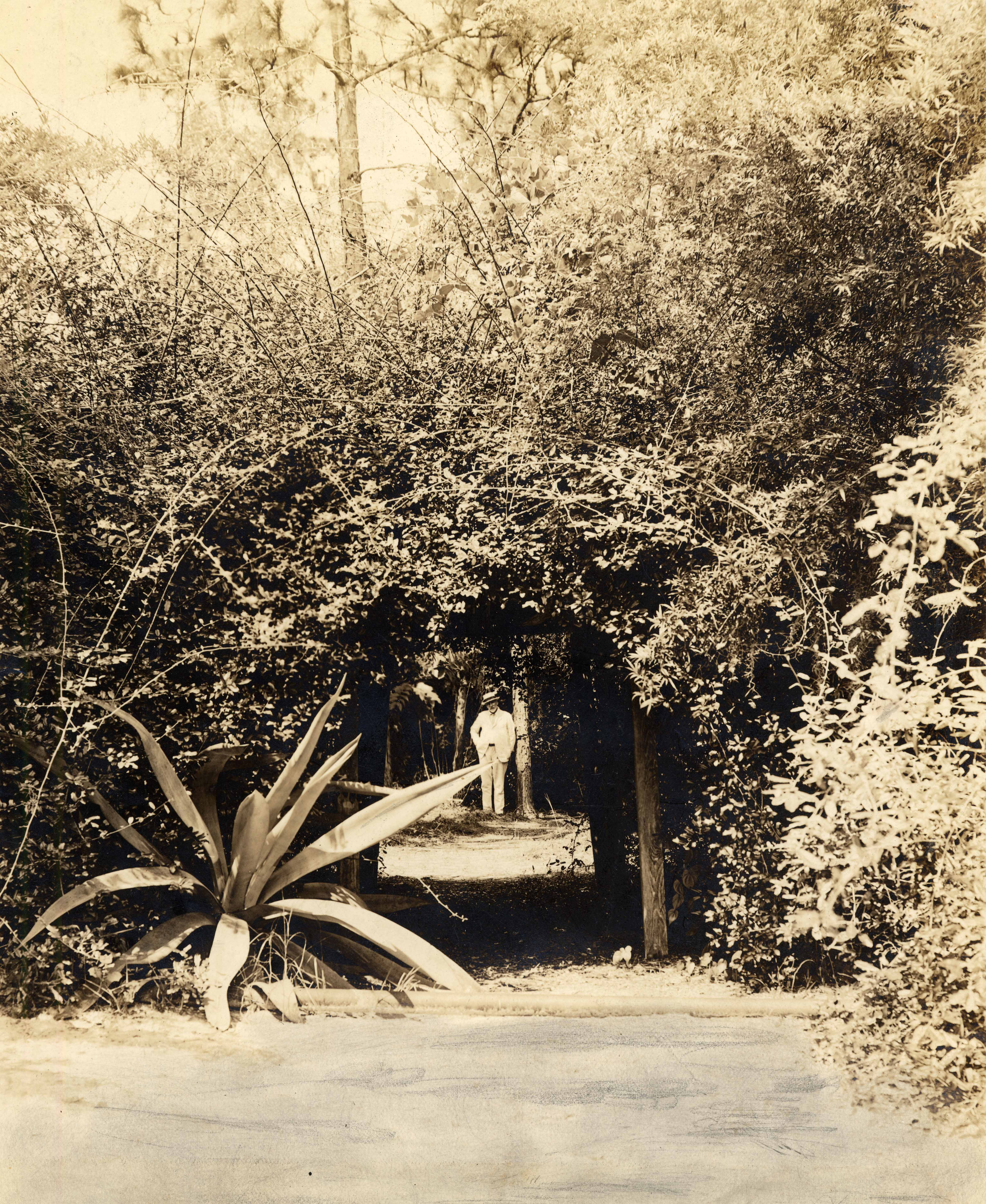
Picture of Henry Nehrling, at his "H. Nehrling's Tropical Garden and Aboretum" circa 1920's

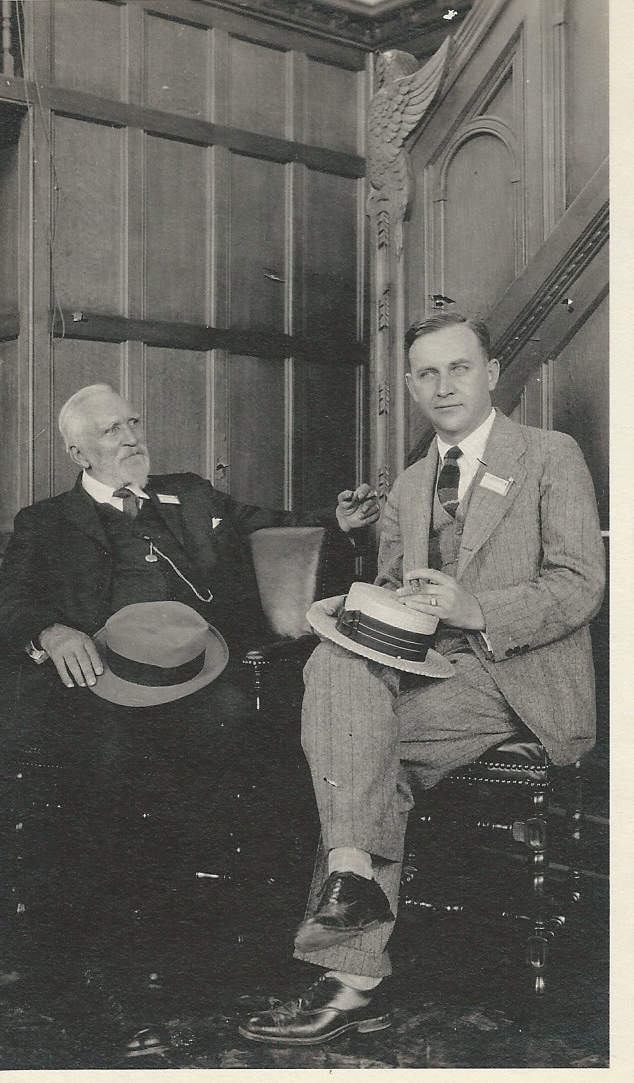
Dr. Henry Nehrling and son Arno Nehrling

Henry Nehrling (May 9, 1853 – November 22, 1929) was an American ornithologist and horticulturist. He published Die Nordamerikanische Vogelwelt (The World of North American Birds) in 1891, and released the translated version Our Native Birds of Song and Beauty in 1893, and completed Our Native Birds of Song and Beauty Volume 2 in 1896.

== Life ==
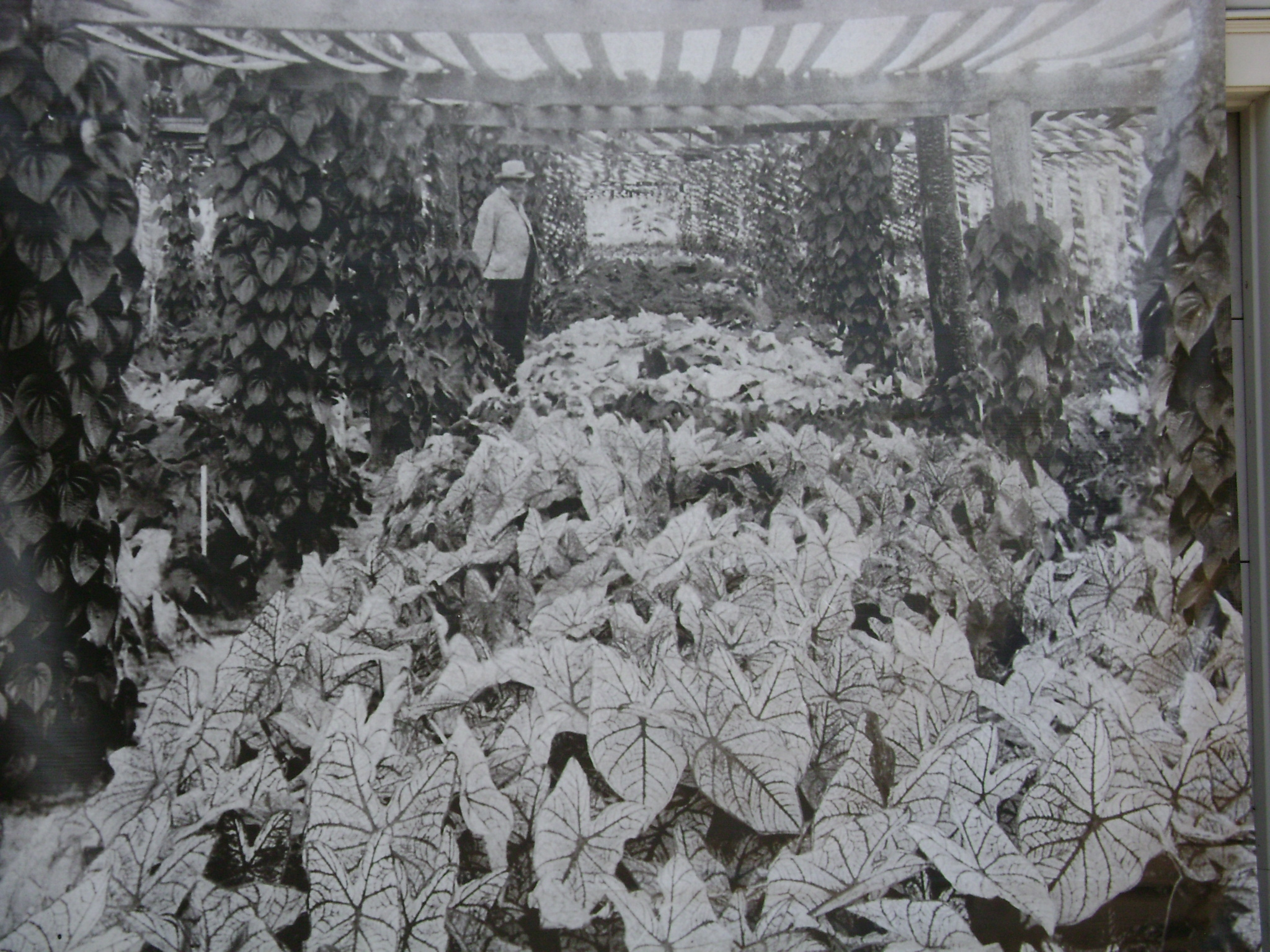
Dr. Henry Nehrling and his famous caladium collection. Gotha, Florida (circa 1908)

Nehrling was born May 9, 1853 in the town of Herman, near Howards Grove in Sheboygan County, Wisconsin to Carl Nehrling and Elizabeth Ruge. He received his early education from his mother and grandfather and he was later sent to a Lutheran parochial school located several miles from his home. His daily walks winter and summer to and from school, through then the primeval forest, familiarized him with every aspect of nature and helped to develop the passionate love for the outdoors, the birds and flowers, that characterized his entire life. He then learned the haunts of the wild things of the woods and the fields, where the Wild Pigeons roosted, where the Grouse had its drumming log and where grew the rarer plants.

From 1869 to 1873 he attended the State Normal School in Addison, Illinois, and upon graduation became a teacher in the Lutheran schools, a position which he held until 1887, teaching at various places in Illinois, Missouri, and Texas. It has been said that he looked upon his teaching mainly as an instrument by means of which he could carry on his studies of ornithology and the changes from one locality added constantly to the breadth of his knowledge to bird life.

=== Milwaukee ===
In 1887 Nehrling was made the deputy collector and inspector of customs at the port of Milwaukee a position he held until 1890 when he was appointed secretary and custodian of the Public Museum of Milwaukee, a post evidently much more to his liking. During his connection with the museum a former member of his staff states that "he made many important additions to the collections and laid the foundation for the future greatness and educating usefulness of this well known institution". Unfortunately owing to politics Nehrling lost his position in 1903 after twelve years of service.

=== Florida ===
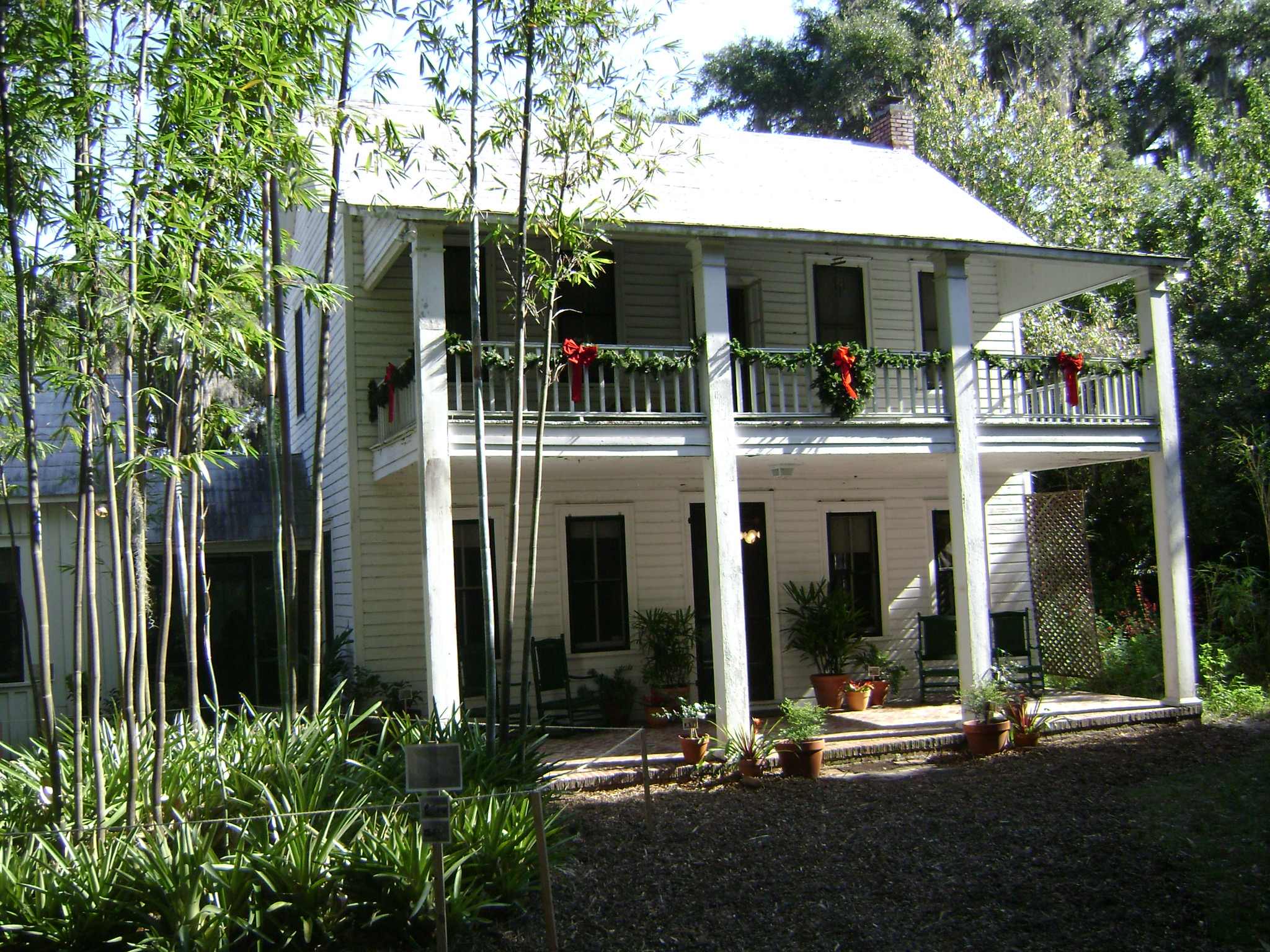
H. Nehrling's Palm Cottage. Gotha, Florida

Prior to his retirement, Nehrling became interested in Florida and bought land in Gotha in 1884, and maintained a garden there, naming it Palm Cottage Gardens. At Palm Cottage, Nehrling experimented with over three thousand species of plants, trees, shrubs, and vines. Three hundred of those became staples in the landscape of Florida. After a freeze in 1917 killed most of his plants, he relocated to Naples, Florida and started a new garden there. Nehrling named his second garden, H. Nehrling's Tropical Garden and Arboretum. At Naples Nehrling carried on his work, he grew, hybridized, and popularized many exotic plants for the general public. Caladiums, palms, bamboo and Hippeastrums (the latter commonly and erroneously referred to as 'amaryllis') were all introduced to the United States by way of his Palm Cottage Gardens. He established a strong friendship with Theodore Luqueer Mead of nearby Oviedo, Florida and they collaborated on many plant experiments.

Nehrling died at his home in Gotha on November 22, 1929, and was laid to rest in the Gotha Cemetery. His Naples garden was purchased by Julius Fleischmann in 1952. Fleischmann removed decades of overgrowth, created two manmade lakes and opened the site to the public as Caribbean Gardens. After his passing in 1968, Lawrence and Nancy Jane Tetzlaff introduced exotic animals in 1969 and stewarded the site under the name Jungle Larry's Safari at Caribbean Gardens. In 2005, the nonprofit Naples Zoo Inc. assumed operations. The garden is recognized as a Collier County Historic Site. Naples Zoo at Caribbean Gardens is a member of the American Public Gardens Association and is an ArbNet accredited arboretum and is on The Morton Register of Arboreta.

In 2009, the Henry Nehrling Society purchased Nehrling's home and gardens in Gotha.

== Works ==
- Die Nordamerikanische Vogelwelt (1891) (The World of North-American Birds)
