= Kill the Flaw =

Studio album by Sevendust
- Released: October 2, 2015
- Studio: Architekt Music (Butler, New Jersey)
- Genre: Alternative metal
- Length: 46:06
- Label: Asylum; 7Bros.
- Producer: Sevendust

Sevendust chronology
Time Travelers & Bonfires (2014)	Kill the Flaw (2015)	All I See Is War (2018)

Singles from Kill the Flaw
- 1. "Thank You" Released: July 26, 2015; 2. "Death Dance" Released: March 22, 2016

Kill the Flaw is the eleventh studio album by American rock band Sevendust. It is the third album that is self-produced and recorded at Architekt Music studio in Butler, New Jersey. It was released on October 2, 2015, through Asylum Records and 7Bros.

== Promotion ==
"Thank You" is the album's first single, which is available on iTunes and other digital outlets. On August 27, 2015, The lyric video for the song "Not Today" was made available for streaming via MetalSucks.net, MetalInsider.net and Metal Injection, as well through all digital retailers. On September 25, 2015, the band made the entire album available for streaming, one week ahead of release.

To promote Kill the Flaw, Sevendust has created "The Making of Kill the Flaw", a series of three webisodes which give fans a look at the process of making the album. Each webisode is filled with exclusive content, behind the scenes footage, interviews, and sneak peeks at the album's songs. The first of three webisodes premiered on September 22. The second webisode premiered on September 29. The third webisode premiered on October 7.

== Album title ==
In an interview with Loudwire, frontman Lajon Witherspoon described the meaning of the album's title:

"It's a testimony to the struggle that we've gone through. We're just trying to kill those flaws. People are trying to keep us down and I think it's made us stronger. The song "Thank You" kind of goes back to that. It's the angst, to strive and to motivate us to continue."

== Reception ==
Professional ratings
Review scores
Source	Rating
AllMusic	3.5/5 stars
AntiHero Magazine	8/10 stars
Blabbermouth	7/10 stars
MetalSucks	4/5 stars
Ultimate Guitar	7/10 stars

Stephen Thomas Erlewine from Allmusic gave the album three and a half out of five stars, describing it as "Returning to their heavy basics". Antihero Magazine's Jake Kussmaul states that "Kill the Flaw delivers the mix of lyrical poignancy and stylistic darkness that longtime fans crave with a ton of heart and a graceful flow."

The album debuted at No. 2 on Billboard's Top Rock Albums chart, selling 21,000 copies in its first week.

== Track listing ==
All tracks are written by Sevendust

No.	Title	Length
1.	"Thank You"	4:27
2.	"Death Dance"	3:39
3.	"Forget"	4:15
4.	"Letters"	3:50
5.	"Cease and Desist"	4:51
6.	"Not Today"	4:42
7.	"Chop"	4:10
8.	"Kill the Flaw"	3:52
9.	"Silly Beast"	4:43
10.	"Peace and Destruction"	4:17
11.	"Torched"	3:20
Total length:		46:06

Bonus track
No.	Title	Length
12.	"Slave the Prey"	3:46
Total length:		49:52

== Personnel ==
Credits via album's liner notes and AllMusic.

Sevendust

- Lajon Witherspoon – lead vocals
- Clint Lowery – lead guitar, backing vocals, keyboards, sound design
- John Connolly – rhythm guitar, backing vocals
- Vinnie Hornsby – bass
- Morgan Rose – drums, backing vocals

Additional personnel

- Mike Ferretti – recording engineer, mixing engineer
- Shane Stanton – assistant engineer
- William Schneider – assistant engineer
- Andy VanDette – mastering
- Kurt Wubbenhorst – keyboards, sound design
- Johnny Fantozzi – drum technician
- Frank Maddocks – creative direction
- Donny Phillips – illustration, design
- Jonathan Weiner – band photography

== Charts ==
Chart (2015)	Peak position
Australian Albums (ARIA)	44
US Billboard 200	13
US Top Hard Rock Albums (Billboard)	2
US Top Rock Albums (Billboard)	2
