= Thank You (Sevendust song) =

Single by Sevendust

from the album Kill the Flaw
- Released: July 27, 2015
- Studio: Architekt Music (Butler, New Jersey)
- Genre: Alternative metal
- Length: 4:27
- Label: 7Bros.
- Songwriters: Clint Lowery; Morgan Rose; Lajon Witherspoon
- Producer: Sevendust

Sevendust singles chronology
"Black (acoustic)" (2014)	"Thank You" (2015)	"Death Dance" (2016)

"Thank You" is a song by the American rock band Sevendust. The song was released as the lead single from their eleventh studio album, titled Kill the Flaw on July 27, 2015. The song including a group of children as background vocals. "It’s one of those things where it can be very cool, or it can be very Nickelodeon," says Clint Lowery. The song was nominated for Best Metal Performance for the 2016 Grammy Awards.

== Track listing ==
No.	Title	Length
1.	"Thank You" (radio edit)	3:59

== Charts ==
Chart (2015)	Peak position
US Mainstream Rock (Billboard)	12
