= Gotha, Florida =

Unincorporated area in Florida, US

- Census-designated place
- Location in Orange County and the state of Florida
- Coordinates: 28°31′50″N 81°31′09″W
- Country: United States
- State: Florida
- County: Orange

Area
  - Total: 1.93 sq mi (5.00 km^{2})
  - Land: 1.71 sq mi (4.44 km^{2})
  - Water: 0.21 sq mi (0.55 km^{2})
- Elevation: 95 ft (29 m)

Population (2020)
  - Total: 2,217
  - Density: 1,292.4/sq mi (498.98/km^{2})
- Time zone: UTC-5 (Eastern (EST))
  - Summer (DST): UTC-4 (EDT)
- ZIP code: 34734
- Area codes: 407, 689
- FIPS code: 12-26900
- GNIS feature ID: 2402540

Gotha is a census-designated place (CDP) in Orange County, Florida, United States. Gotha is located between Ocoee and Windermere. As of the 2020 census, Gotha had a population of 2,217. It is part of the Orlando–Kissimmee Metropolitan Statistical Area. It is the resting place of the famous painter Bob Ross.

== History ==
A post office opened at Gotha in 1883. The town of Gotha was founded in 1885 by German immigrant H. A. Hempel. Hempel Avenue, the "main street" of Gotha, is named in his honor. After buying 1000 acres, the majority of acreage still designated as United States Territory, he laid out a town and named it after his birthplace of Gotha, Germany. He then mailed promotional pamphlets to northern cities and to Europe advertising the warm climate and mild winters.

In time, several German American families moved to and settled in and around Gotha. It is home to Nehrling Gardens, developed by horticulturist Henry Nehrling.

== Geography ==
According to the United States Census Bureau, the CDP has a total area of 5.1 km^{2} (2.0 sq mi), of which 4.6 km^{2} (1.8 sq mi) is land and 0.5 km^{2} (0.19 sq mi) (10.20%) is water.

=== Climate ===
Gotha experiences a Humid subtropical climate (cfa) with all year precipitation, warm to hot summers, wet and mild to warm winters.

Climate data for Gotha, FL
Month	Jan	Feb	Mar	Apr	May	Jun	Jul	Aug	Sep	Oct	Nov	Dec	Year
Record high °F (°C)	87.0 (30.6)	90.0 (32.2)	92.0 (33.3)	96.0 (35.6)	97.0 (36.1)	100.0 (37.8)	100.0 (37.8)	99.0 (37.2)	97.0 (36.1)	95.0 (35.0)	89.0 (31.7)	90.0 (32.2)	100.0 (37.8)
Mean daily maximum °F (°C)	70.9 (21.6)	73.4 (23.0)	77.6 (25.3)	82.5 (28.1)	88.2 (31.2)	90.9 (32.7)	92.0 (33.3)	91.7 (33.2)	89.4 (31.9)	84.4 (29.1)	78.1 (25.6)	72.5 (22.5)	82.6 (28.1)
Daily mean °F (°C)	59.85 (15.47)	62.6 (17.0)	66.65 (19.25)	71.35 (21.86)	77.35 (25.19)	81.5 (27.5)	82.95 (28.31)	82.95 (28.31)	81.1 (27.3)	75.5 (24.2)	68.4 (20.2)	62.35 (16.86)	72.71 (22.62)
Mean daily minimum °F (°C)	48.8 (9.3)	51.8 (11.0)	55.7 (13.2)	60.2 (15.7)	66.5 (19.2)	72.1 (22.3)	73.9 (23.3)	74.2 (23.4)	72.8 (22.7)	66.6 (19.2)	58.7 (14.8)	52.2 (11.2)	62.8 (17.1)
Record low °F (°C)	24.0 (−4.4)	28.0 (−2.2)	31.0 (−0.6)	40.0 (4.4)	52.0 (11.1)	60.0 (15.6)	67.0 (19.4)	64.0 (17.8)	56.0 (13.3)	43.0 (6.1)	29.0 (−1.7)	20.0 (−6.7)	20.0 (−6.7)
Average precipitation inches (mm)	2.7 (69)	2.6 (66)	3.9 (99)	2.5 (64)	3.3 (84)	8.2 (210)	7.1 (180)	7.6 (190)	5.7 (140)	3.0 (76)	2.2 (56)	2.7 (69)	51.5 (1,303)
Average precipitation days	6.6	6.8	7.2	5.4	6.8	14.6	15.4	16.2	12.5	7.7	5.9	6.2	111.3
Average relative humidity (%)	71.5	69.5	67.5	66.5	67.5	74.0	76.5	79.0	78.5	74.5	72.0	72.5	72.5
Average dew point °F (°C)	51.0 (10.6)	51.0 (10.6)	54.0 (12.2)	59.0 (15.0)	64.0 (17.8)	70.0 (21.1)	72.0 (22.2)	73.0 (22.8)	71.0 (21.7)	65.0 (18.3)	57.0 (13.9)	52.0 (11.1)	61.6 (16.4)
Average ultraviolet index	5	5	6	6	7	7	7	7	7	6	5	5	6
Source 1: Extremes, humidity and dewpoint on myforecast.co
Source 2: Max, Min, Mean and RAIN and RAINDAYS on Best places GOTHA SUN and UV (2009-2020)

== Demographics ==
Historical population
Census	Pop.	Note	%±
2010	1,915		—
2020	2,217		15.8%
U.S. Decennial Census

=== 2020 census ===
As of the 2020 census, Gotha had a population of 2,217. The median age was 39.4 years. 26.6% of residents were under the age of 18 and 12.6% of residents were 65 years of age or older. For every 100 females there were 93.1 males, and for every 100 females age 18 and over there were 84.7 males age 18 and over.

100.0% of residents lived in urban areas, while 0.0% lived in rural areas.

There were 685 households in Gotha, of which 47.3% had children under the age of 18 living in them. Of all households, 73.3% were married-couple households, 5.0% were households with a male householder and no spouse or partner present, and 16.5% were households with a female householder and no spouse or partner present. About 8.8% of all households were made up of individuals and 3.9% had someone living alone who was 65 years of age or older.

There were 722 housing units, of which 5.1% were vacant. The homeowner vacancy rate was 2.0% and the rental vacancy rate was 10.6%.

Racial composition as of the 2020 census
Race	Number	Percent
White	1,360	61.3%
Black or African American	158	7.1%
American Indian and Alaska Native	18	0.8%
Asian	261	11.8%
Native Hawaiian and Other Pacific Islander	0	0.0%
Some other race	91	4.1%
Two or more races	329	14.8%
Hispanic or Latino (of any race)	341	15.4%

=== 2000 census ===
As of the census of 2000, there were 731 people, 249 households, and 210 families residing in the CDP. The population density was 160.4 people/km^{2} (415 people/mi^{2}). There were 264 housing units at an average density of 57.9 units/km^{2} (150 units/mi^{2}). The racial makeup of the CDP was 88.78% White, 4.38% African American, 0.55% Native American, 3.56% Asian, 1.23% from other races, and 1.50% from two or more races. Hispanic or Latino of any race were 7.11% of the population.

There were 249 households, out of which 46.2% had children under the age of 18 living with them, 71.9% were married couples living together, 7.6% had a female householder with no husband present, and 15.3% were non-families. 12.4% of all households were made up of individuals, and 4.8% had someone living alone who was 65 years of age or older. The average household size was 2.92 and the average family size was 3.18.

In the CDP, the population was spread out, with 28.9% under the age of 18, 5.7% from 18 to 24, 33.0% from 25 to 44, 25.3% from 45 to 64, and 7.1% who were 65 years of age or older. The median age was 36 years. For every 100 females, there were 97.0 males. For every 100 females age 18 and over, there were 102.3 males.

The median income for a household in the CDP was $59,808, and the median income for a family was $76,286. Males had a median income of $42,143 versus $42,692 for females. The per capita income for the CDP was $32,734. About 9.8% of families and 20.0% of the population were below the poverty line, including 42.5% of those under age 18 and none of those age 65 or over.

== Education ==
Gotha is within Orange County Public Schools. Residents are zoned to Thornebrooke Elementary School, Gotha Middle School, and Olympia High School.
