= National Register of Historic Places listings in Orange County, Florida =

Location of Orange County in Florida

This is a list of the National Register of Historic Places listings in Orange County, Florida.

This is intended to be a complete list of the properties and districts on the National Register of Historic Places in Orange County, Florida, United States. The locations of National Register properties and districts for which the latitude and longitude coordinates are included below, may be seen in an online map.

There are 58 properties and districts listed on the National Register in the county. Another 2 properties were once listed but have been removed.

This National Park Service list is complete through NPS recent listings posted October 16, 2026.

Contents: Counties in Florida (non-linked contain no National Register listings)
Alachua - Baker - Bay - Bradford - Brevard - Broward - Calhoun - Charlotte - Citrus - Clay - Collier - Columbia - DeSoto - Dixie - Duval - Escambia - Flagler - Franklin - Gadsden - Gilchrist - Glades - Gulf - Hamilton - Hardee - Hendry - Hernando - Highlands - Hillsborough (Tampa) - Holmes - Indian River - Jackson - Jefferson - Lafayette - Lake - Lee - Leon - Levy - Liberty - Madison - Manatee - Marion - Martin - Miami-Dade (Miami) - Monroe - Nassau - Okaloosa - Okeechobee - Orange - Osceola - Palm Beach - Pasco - Pinellas - Polk - Putnam - St. Johns - St. Lucie - Santa Rosa - Sarasota - Seminole - Sumter - Suwannee - Taylor - Union - Volusia - Wakulla - Walton - Washington

== Current listings ==
	Name on the Register	Image	Date listed	Location	City or town	Description
1	1890 Windermere School	1890 Windermere School	June 5, 2003 (#03000509)	113 West Seventh Avenue; 28°29′35″N 81°32′07″W	Windermere	
2	All Saints Episcopal Church	All Saints Episcopal Church	January 7, 2000 (#99001647)	338 East Lyman Avenue; 28°35′40″N 81°20′55″W	Winter Park	
3	Apopka Seaboard Air Line Railway Depot	Apopka Seaboard Air Line Railway Depot	March 15, 1993 (#93000134)	36 East Station Street; 28°40′11″N 81°30′39″W	Apopka	
4	S. Howard Atha House	S. Howard Atha House	September 2, 2009 (#09000672)	1101 West Princeton Street; 28°34′17″N 81°23′41″W	Orlando	
5	Atlantic Coast Line Station	Atlantic Coast Line Station	July 28, 2022 (#100007973)	1400 Sligh Blvd. 28°31′36″N 81°22′55″W	Orlando	
6	Baptist Terrace Apartments	Baptist Terrace Apartments	July 13, 2022 (#100007476)	414 East Pine St. 28°32′28″N 81°22′18″W	Orlando	
7	Robert Bruce Barbour House	Robert Bruce Barbour House	December 31, 2008 (#08001244)	656 Park Avenue North; 28°36′10″N 81°21′04″W	Winter Park	
8	Edward Hill Brewer House	Edward Hill Brewer House	April 22, 1982 (#82002378)	240 Trismen Terrace; 28°36′03″N 81°20′33″W	Winter Park	
9	J. J. Bridges House	J. J. Bridges House	January 26, 1984 (#84000932)	704 South Kuhl Avenue; 28°31′59″N 81°22′38″W	Orlando	
10	Carroll Building	Carroll Building	March 4, 1993 (#93000135)	407-409 South Park Avenue; 28°40′17″N 81°30′34″W	Apopka	
11	Church of the Good Shepherd	Church of the Good Shepherd	March 28, 2011 (#11000144)	331 Lake Avenue; 28°37′11″N 81°22′05″W	Maitland	part of the Florida's Carpenter Gothic Churches MPS
12	Comstock-Harris House	Comstock-Harris House	January 13, 1983 (#83001432)	724 Bonita Drive; 28°36′19″N 81°20′08″W	Winter Park	
13	Downtown Winter Park Historic District	Downtown Winter Park Historic District	May 3, 2011 (#11000158)	Roughly Canton Ave, Center St, Comstock Ave, New York Ave, 28°35′50″N 81°21′07″W	Winter Park	
14	Eatonville Historic District	Eatonville Historic District	February 3, 1998 (#97001214)	Roughly bounded by Wymore Road, Eaton Street, Fords and East Avenues, and Ruffel and Clark Streets; 28°37′04″N 81°22′52″W	Eatonville	
15	First Church of Christ Scientist	First Church of Christ Scientist	June 3, 1980 (#80000956)	24 North Rosalind Avenue; 28°32′34″N 81°22′35″W	Orlando	
16	Gary-Morgan House	Gary-Morgan House	March 2, 2015 (#15000062)	1041 Osceola Ave. 28°35′52″N 81°20′18″W	Winter Park	
17	Siegmund and Marilyn Goldman House	Siegmund and Marilyn Goldman House	February 4, 2019 (#100003411)	1670 Huron Trail; 28°38′04″N 81°20′53″W	Maitland	Designed by architect Nils M. Schweizer in 1964.
18	Griffin Park Historic District	Griffin Park Historic District	July 18, 1996 (#96000784)	Roughly bounded by Avondale and South Division Avenues, Carter Street, and Interstate 4; 28°31′58″N 81°23′10″W	Orlando	
19	Holden-Parramore Historic District	Holden-Parramore Historic District	September 23, 2009 (#09000746)	Bounded by West Church Street, South Division Avenue, Long Street, McFall Avenue, and South Parramore Avenue; 28°32′18″N 81°23′13″W	Orlando	
20	John N. Huttig Estate	John N. Huttig Estate	January 21, 1993 (#91001776)	435 Peachtree Road; 28°33′14″N 81°23′10″W	Orlando	Demolished in 2005, entry gate and garden cottage remain
21	Interlachen Avenue Historic District	Interlachen Avenue Historic District	November 30, 2011 (#11000861)	Roughly bounded by S. Knowles, E. New England, S. Interlachen Aves., E. Morse Blvd., Lincoln & E. Canton Aves. 28°35′58″N 81°20′55″W	Winter Park	
22	Jack Kerouac House	Jack Kerouac House	February 6, 2013 (#12001254)	1418 Clouser Ave. 28°33′52″N 81°23′30″W	Orlando	
23	Knowles Memorial Chapel	Knowles Memorial Chapel	December 8, 1997 (#97001448)	1000 Holt Avenue; 28°35′32″N 81°20′54″W	Winter Park	On the Rollins College campus
24	Lake Adair-Lake Concord Historic District	Lake Adair-Lake Concord Historic District	December 30, 2011 (#11000958)	Roughly Golfview St., Edgewater Ct., Alameda St., & Peachtree Rd. 28°33′23″N 81°23′28″W	Orlando	
25	Lake Eola Heights Historic District	Lake Eola Heights Historic District	January 16, 1992 (#91001912)	Roughly bounded by Hillcrest Street, North Hyer Avenue, Ridgewood Street, and North Magnolia Avenue; 28°32′57″N 81°22′15″W	Orlando	
26	Lake Ivanhoe Historic Residential District	Lake Ivanhoe Historic Residential District	December 20, 2010 (#10001042)	Roughly Orlando St., Interstate 4, Lakeview St., Edgewater Dr. 28°34′01″N 81°22′55″W	Orlando	
27	Lake Lawsona Historic District	Lake Lawsona Historic District	April 3, 2019 (#100003410)	Bounded by South & Robinson Sts., Summerlin & Hampton Aves. 28°32′34″N 81°21′41″W	Orlando	
28	James Laughlin House	James Laughlin House	June 28, 2016 (#16000423)	5538 Sydonie Dr. 28°44′30″N 81°36′04″W	Zellwood	
29	Maitland Art Center	Maitland Art Center	November 17, 1982 (#82001036)	231 West Packwood Avenue; 28°37′32″N 81°22′03″W	Maitland	1937 art gallery is one of the few examples of Mayan Revival architecture in the Southeast. Designated as a National Historic Landmark on August 25, 2014 (Reference No. 14000920).
30	Mitchell-Tibbetts House	Mitchell-Tibbetts House	November 7, 1991 (#91001661)	21 East Orange Street; 28°40′40″N 81°30′40″W	Apopka	
31	Mizell-Leu House Historic District	Mizell-Leu House Historic District	December 29, 1994 (#94001495)	1730 North Forest Avenue; 28°34′03″N 81°21′26″W	Orlando	
32	Ocoee Christian Church	Ocoee Christian Church	March 28, 1997 (#97000277)	15 South Bluford Avenue; 28°34′07″N 81°32′40″W	Ocoee	
33	Old Orlando Railroad Depot	Old Orlando Railroad Depot	April 22, 1976 (#76000604)	Depot Place and West Church Street; 28°32′22″N 81°22′50″W	Orlando	
34	Orlando Utilities Commission Administration Building	Orlando Utilities Commission Administration Building	June 7, 2012 (#12000321)	500 S. Orange St. 28°32′12″N 81°22′43″W	Orlando	Now the Aloft Hotel
35	Palm Cottage Gardens	Palm Cottage Gardens	November 7, 2000 (#00000982)	2267 Hempel Avenue; 28°32′01″N 81°31′20″W	Gotha	
36	Cal Palmer Memorial Building	Cal Palmer Memorial Building	November 29, 1995 (#95001364)	502 Main Street; 28°29′43″N 81°32′07″W	Windermere	
37	Dr. P. Phillips House	Dr. P. Phillips House	July 10, 1979 (#79000685)	135 Lucerne Circle, Northeast; 28°32′08″N 81°22′34″W	Orlando	
38	Plymouth Elementary School		October 19, 2026 (#100013550)	3593 Hogshead Road; 28°41′41″N 81°34′05″W	Apopka vicinity	
39	Albin Polasek House and Studio	Albin Polasek House and Studio	May 2, 2000 (#99000767)	633 Osceola Avenue; 28°35′47″N 81°20′39″W	Winter Park	
40	Rogers Building	Rogers Building	July 7, 1983 (#83001433)	37-39 South Magnolia Avenue; 28°32′34″N 81°22′14″W	Orlando	
41	Rosemere Historic District	Rosemere Historic District	October 21, 2009 (#09000844)	Roughly bounded by East Harvard Street, North Orange Avenue, Cornell Avenue, and East Vanderbilt Street; 28°34′10″N 81°22′26″W	Orlando	
42	Annie Russell Theatre	Annie Russell Theatre	July 15, 1998 (#98000863)	1000 Holt Avenue; 28°35′33″N 81°20′53″W	Winter Park	On the Rollins College campus
43	Ryan & Company Lumber Yard	Ryan & Company Lumber Yard	February 25, 1993 (#93000074)	215 East Fifth Street; 28°40′18″N 81°30′27″W	Apopka	
44	Luther F. Tilden House	Luther F. Tilden House	November 15, 1996 (#96001337)	940 Tildenville School Road; 28°33′28″N 81°36′37″W	Winter Garden	
45	Tinker Building	Tinker Building	July 17, 1980 (#80000957)	16-18 West Pine Street; 28°32′27″N 81°22′47″W	Orlando	
46	Tinker Field	Tinker Field	May 14, 2004 (#04000456)	1610 West Church Street; 28°32′27″N 81°24′16″W	Orlando	
47	Twin Mounds Archeological District		January 19, 1992 (#91001957)	Address Restricted	Sorrento	
48	Waite-Davis House	Waite-Davis House	August 2, 1990 (#90001127)	5 South Central Avenue; 28°40′39″N 81°30′41″W	Apopka	
49	Thomas Picton Warlow Sr. House	Thomas Picton Warlow Sr. House	October 8, 2009 (#09000808)	701 Driver Avenue; 28°35′30″N 81°23′05″W	Winter Park	
50	William H. Waterhouse House	William H. Waterhouse House	February 2, 1983 (#83001434)	820 South Lake Lily Drive; 28°37′15″N 81°22′02″W	Maitland	
51	Well'sbuilt Hotel	Well'sbuilt Hotel	February 4, 2000 (#00000006)	511 West South Street; 28°32′17″N 81°23′09″W	Orlando	
52	Windermere Town Hall	Windermere Town Hall	June 3, 1994 (#94000539)	520 Main Street; 28°29′42″N 81°32′10″W	Windermere	
53	Winter Garden Downtown Historic District	Winter Garden Downtown Historic District	August 1, 1996 (#96000850)	Roughly bounded by Woodland, Tremaine, Henderson, and Lake View Streets; 28°33′56″N 81°35′08″W	Winter Garden	
54	Winter Garden Historic Residential District	Winter Garden Historic Residential District	August 1, 1996 (#96000849)	Roughly bounded by Plant, Boyd, Tilden, and Central Streets; 28°34′01″N 81°35′25″W	Winter Garden	
55	Winter Park Country Club and Golf Course	Winter Park Country Club and Golf Course	September 17, 1999 (#99001148)	761 Old England Avenue; 28°36′15″N 81°21′12″W	Winter Park	
56	Withers-Maguire House	Withers-Maguire House	April 2, 1987 (#87000579)	16 East Oakland Avenue; 28°34′15″N 81°32′38″W	Ocoee	
57	Woman's Club of Ocoee	Woman's Club of Ocoee	February 14, 2011 (#11000002)	10 North Lakewood Avenue; 28°34′11″N 81°32′33″W	Ocoee	Clubhouses of Florida's Woman's Clubs MPS
58	Woman's Club of Winter Park	Woman's Club of Winter Park	May 4, 1995 (#95000537)	419 Interlachen Avenue; 28°35′39″N 81°20′57″W	Winter Park	

== Former listings ==
	Name on the Register	Image	Date listed	Date removed	Location	City or town	Description
1	George R. Newell House	George R. Newell House	December 30, 1974 (#75002163)	June 11, 1976	624 S. Lake Ave.	Orlando	A Late Victorian house from 1885. Demolished February 1975.
2	The Parsonage		October 2, 1973 (#73000595)	January 27, 1977	Fairbanks Ave. at Chase Ave.	Winter Park	Demolished December 21, 1976.

== See also ==
- List of National Historic Landmarks in Florida
- National Register of Historic Places listings in Florida
