= Rogers Building =

Rogers Building can refer to:

- Rogers Building (Toronto), Canada, the corporate head office of Rogers Communications
- Rogers Building (Vancouver), a historic site
- Rogers Building (Victoria, British Columbia), a historic site
- Rogers Building (Florida), a historic site in Orlando, Florida
- Col. Matthew Rogers Building, Athens, Illinois
- Rogers Building (MIT), the first building built for the Massachusetts Institute of Technology, in Back Bay, Boston, and also a later replacement MIT building in Cambridge, Massachusetts
