= Twin Mounds =

Twin Mounds may refer to:

- Twin Mounds Archeological District, a U.S. historic district east of Sorrento, Florida
- Twin Mounds Site, a Mississippian culture archaeological site near Barlow, Kentucky
- Twin Mounds, a double-conical burial mound at Pinson Mounds in Madison County, Tennessee

== See also ==
- Twin Mound, Kansas, a townsite in western Douglas County, Kansas
