= 9/11 Memorial (Windermere, Florida) =

Coordinates: 28.4948°N 81.5355°W

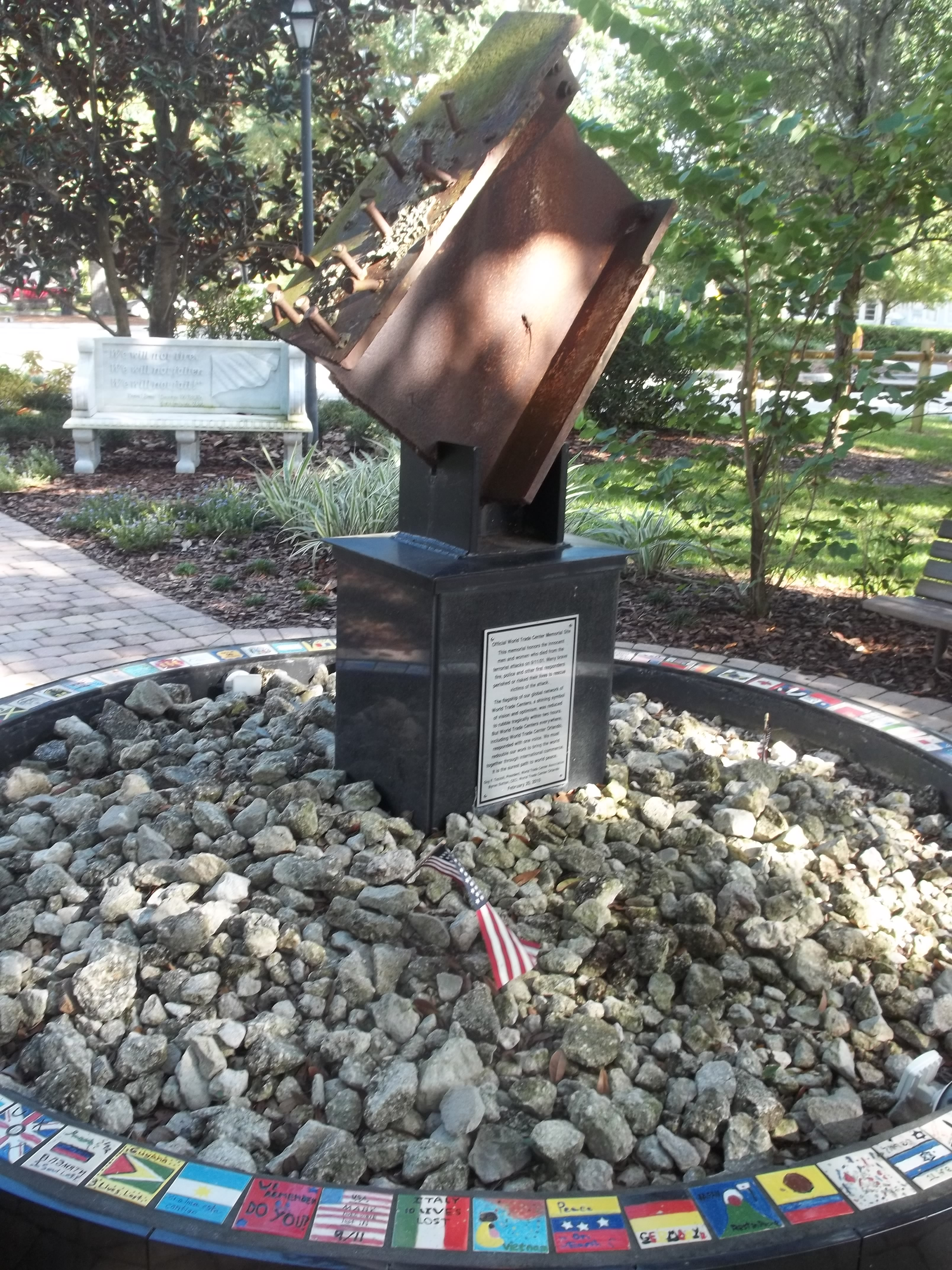
The memorial in 2019

The 9/11 Memorial at Windermere, Florida is a memorial dedicated to the victims of the September 11 attacks in New York City, the Pentagon and Flight 93 in 2001. The memorial features a piece of steel from the World Trade Center that fell to the ground among the rubble and debris. Surrounding it are ceramic tiles that honor those who died in the attacks; each person that lost their life had a tile representing their country. A cement path has also been created around the steel from the World Trade Center. The idea for a memorial to the September 11 attacks in Windermere was conceived of by Boy Scout Jeff Cox as part of his Eagle Scout Leadership Service Project. Cox orchestrated the project with the help of his family, the mayor of Windermere, Gary Bruhn and Cox's Boy Scout Troop, Troop 6. The dedication to this memorial was held on Saturday, February 20, 2010. A primary plaque described the September 11 attacks and the memorial. An ancillary plaque was placed in the honor of the mayor, Troop 6, and Cox for erecting the memorial.

== Physical features ==
The physical features of the memorial include a WTC Steel piece from when the collapse occurred. Surrounding this is gravel rocks in a circle as well as ceramic tiles with emblems embedded upon them with embellishments of what happened; it honored those who died. A cement path loops around the primary monument and leads to the town hall and the library of Windermere. Grass, trees and other plants surround the memorial also.

== Dedication ceremony ==
The memorial was dedicated on Saturday, February 20, 2010. Before the actual dedication began, Boy Scouts from Troop 6 rode in with the Patriot Guard as a parade of sorts. The parade went through town and stopped just a small distance from the memorial itself so the Scouts could start helping with the ceremony immediately. The opening ceremony included music from several different genres as well as a selection of professional artists. After the opening presentations of music, family members of those who died in the attacks were able to talk. Later, the monument was unveiled by a team of scouts from Troop 6.
