= St. George Antiochian Orthodox Church (Orlando, Florida) =

Historic church in Florida, United States

- U.S. National Register of Historic Places
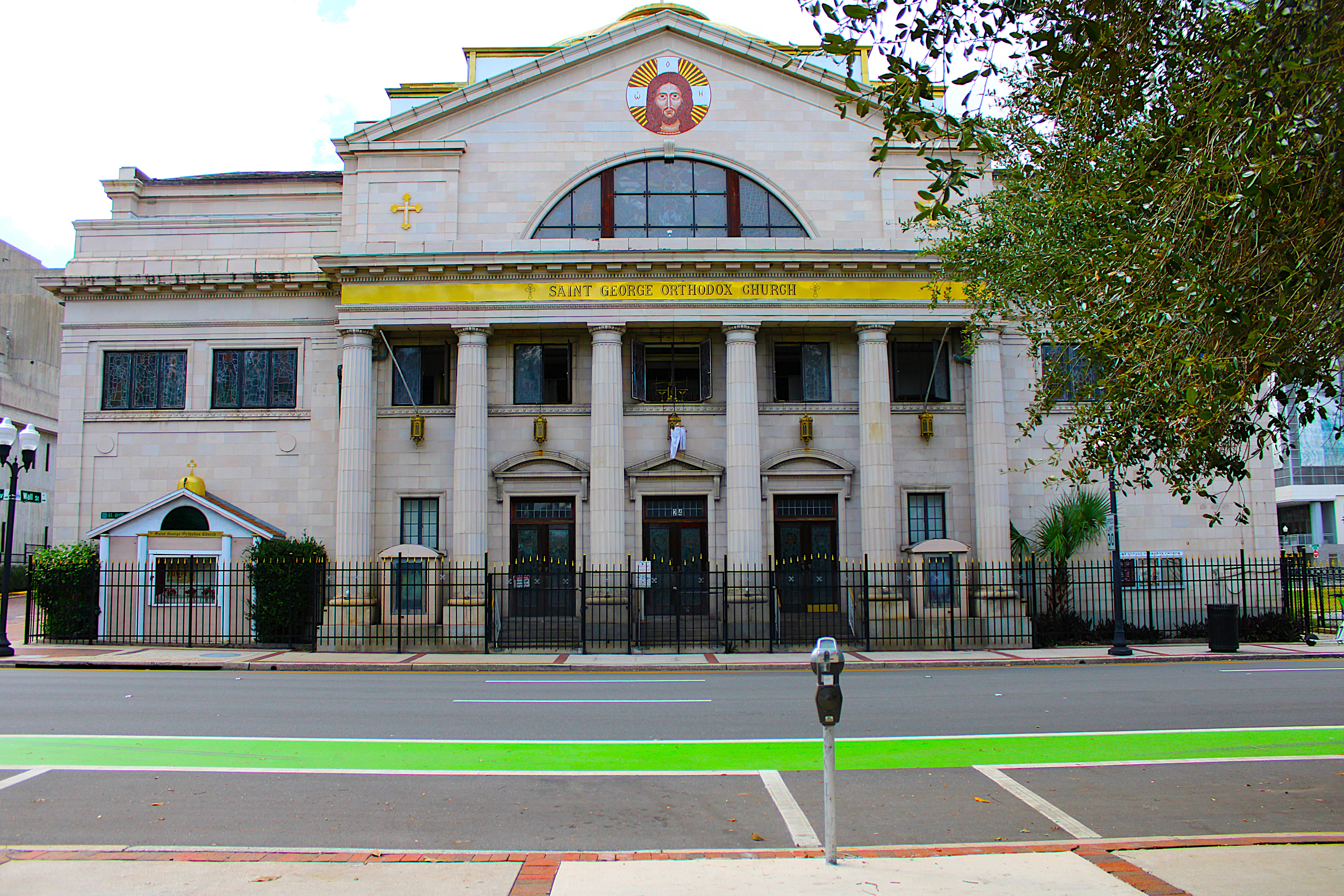
- St. George Antiochian Orthodox Church

- Location within Florida Location within the United States
- Location: 24 North Rosalind Avenue, Orlando, Florida
- Coordinates: 28°32′34″N 81°22′35″W
- Built: 1926–27
- Architect: George Foote Dunham
- Architectural style: Classical Revival
- NRHP reference No.: 80000956
- Added to NRHP: June 3, 1980

The St. George Antiochian Orthodox Church is an Antiochian Orthodox church across from Lake Eola in Orlando, Florida.

== History ==
Built in 1927, the building was added to the National Register of Historic Places on June 3, 1980.

The building was originally the First Church of Christ, Scientist until 1975 when it was abandoned by the congregation and acquired by its current owner Fr. John Hamatie and the Eastern Orthodox congregation.

St. George Antiochian Orthodox Church is under the Antiochian Orthodox Christian Archdiocese of North America. The Church is under the guidance of His Eminence Metropolitan Saba Isper as Archbishop and Metropolitan, and the Very Reverend Father John E Hamatie as the Presiding Priest.

== Gallery ==
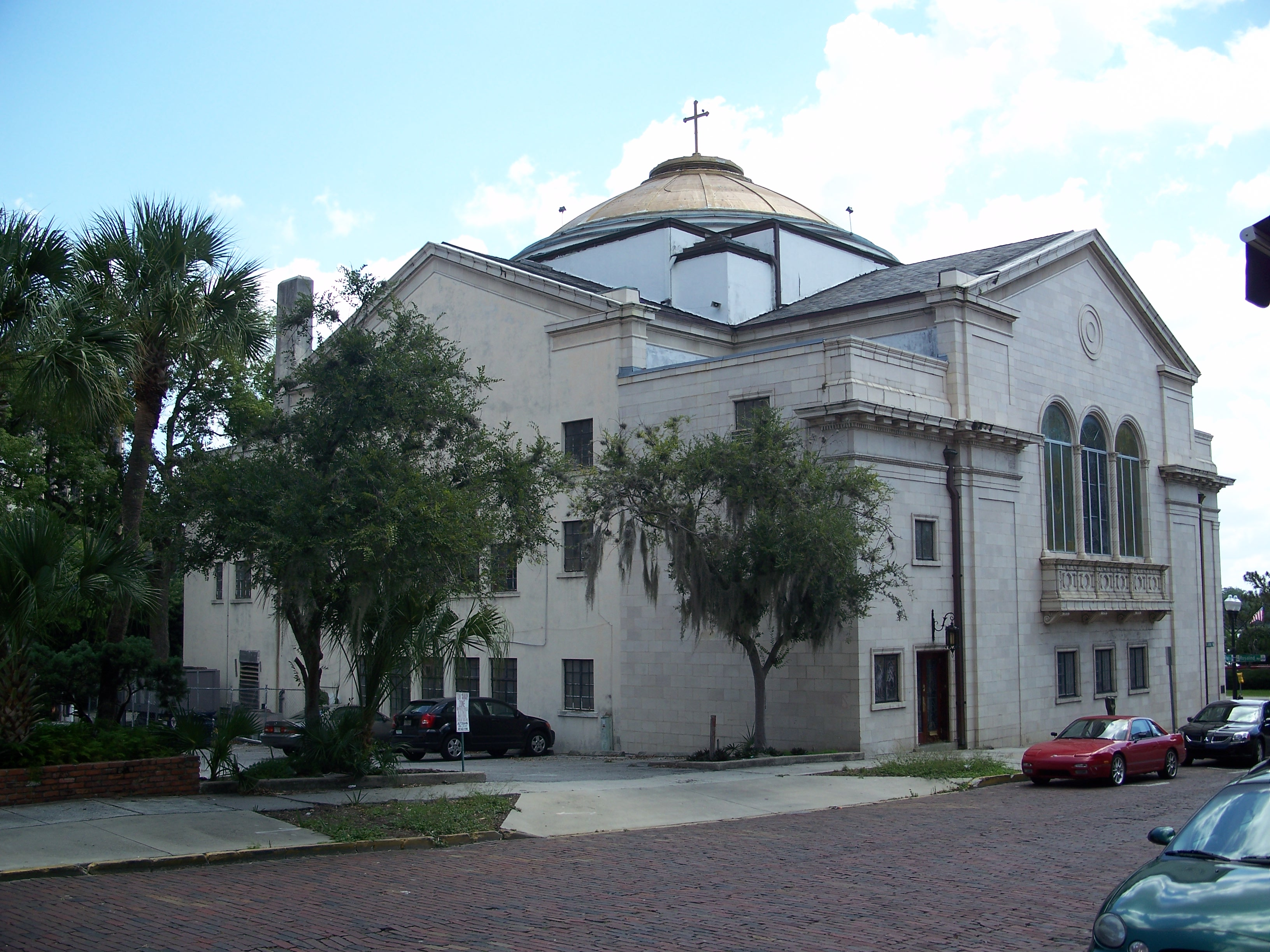
Rear and side view

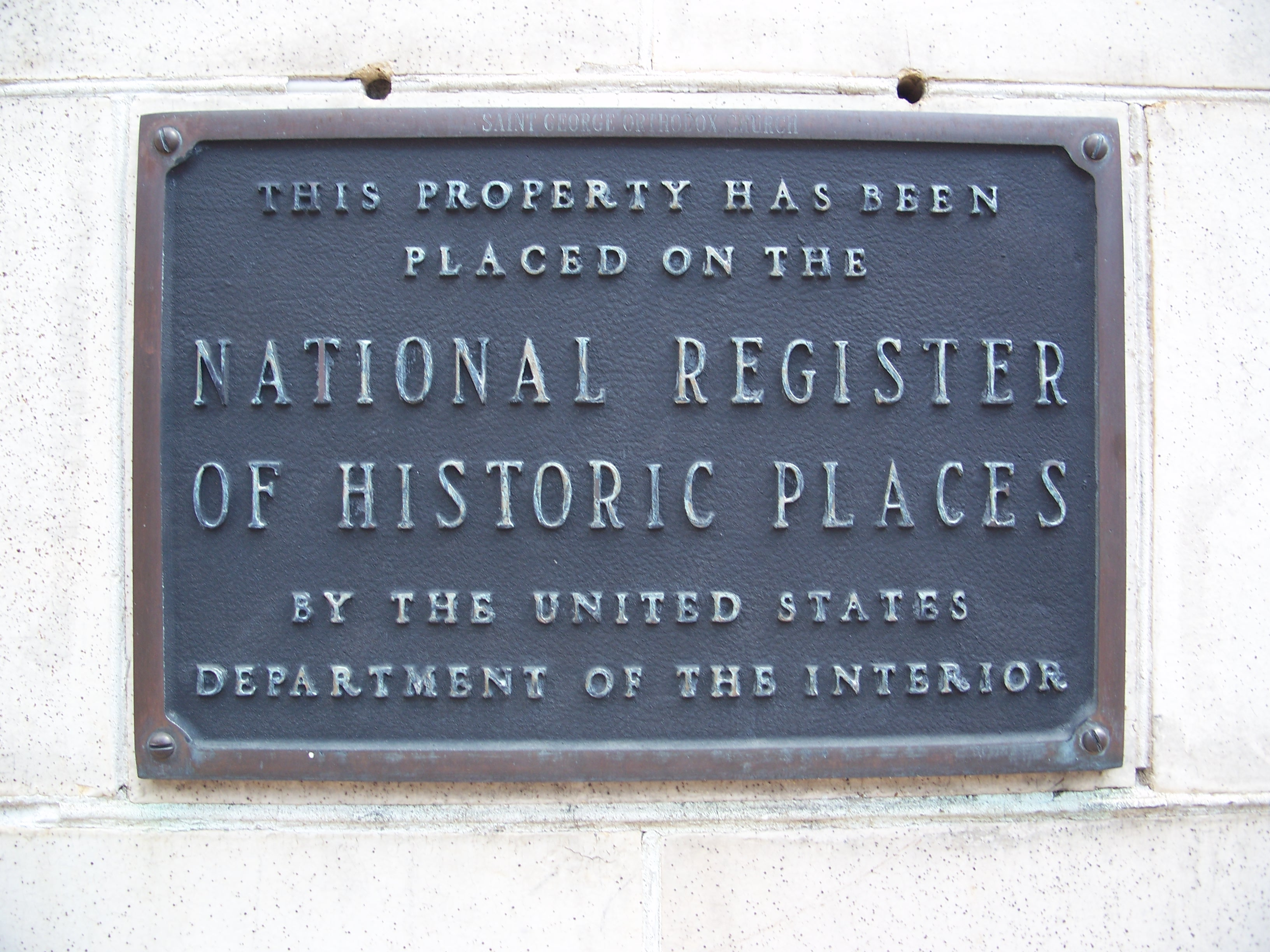
Actual National register plaque on church

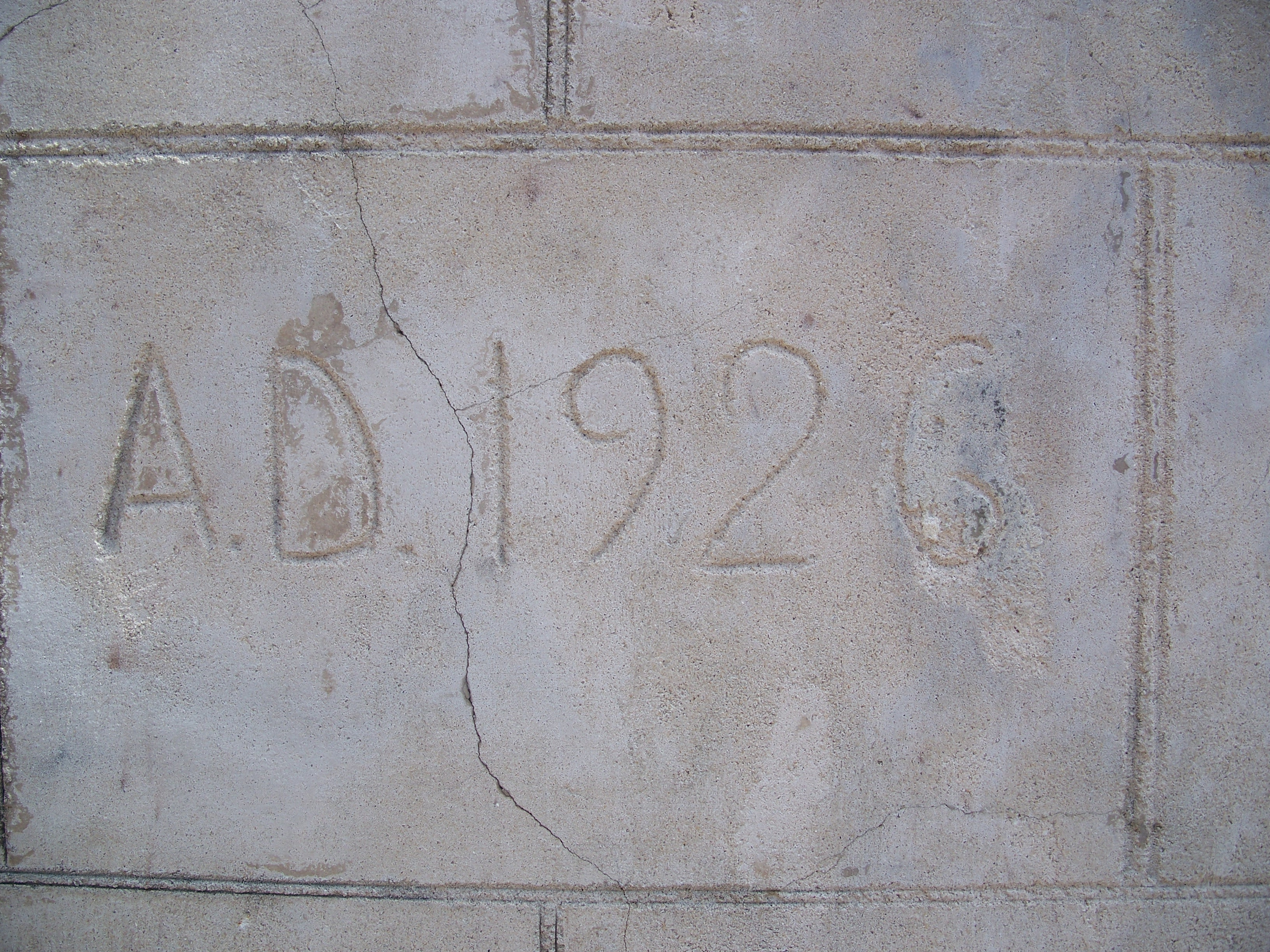
Church cornerstone

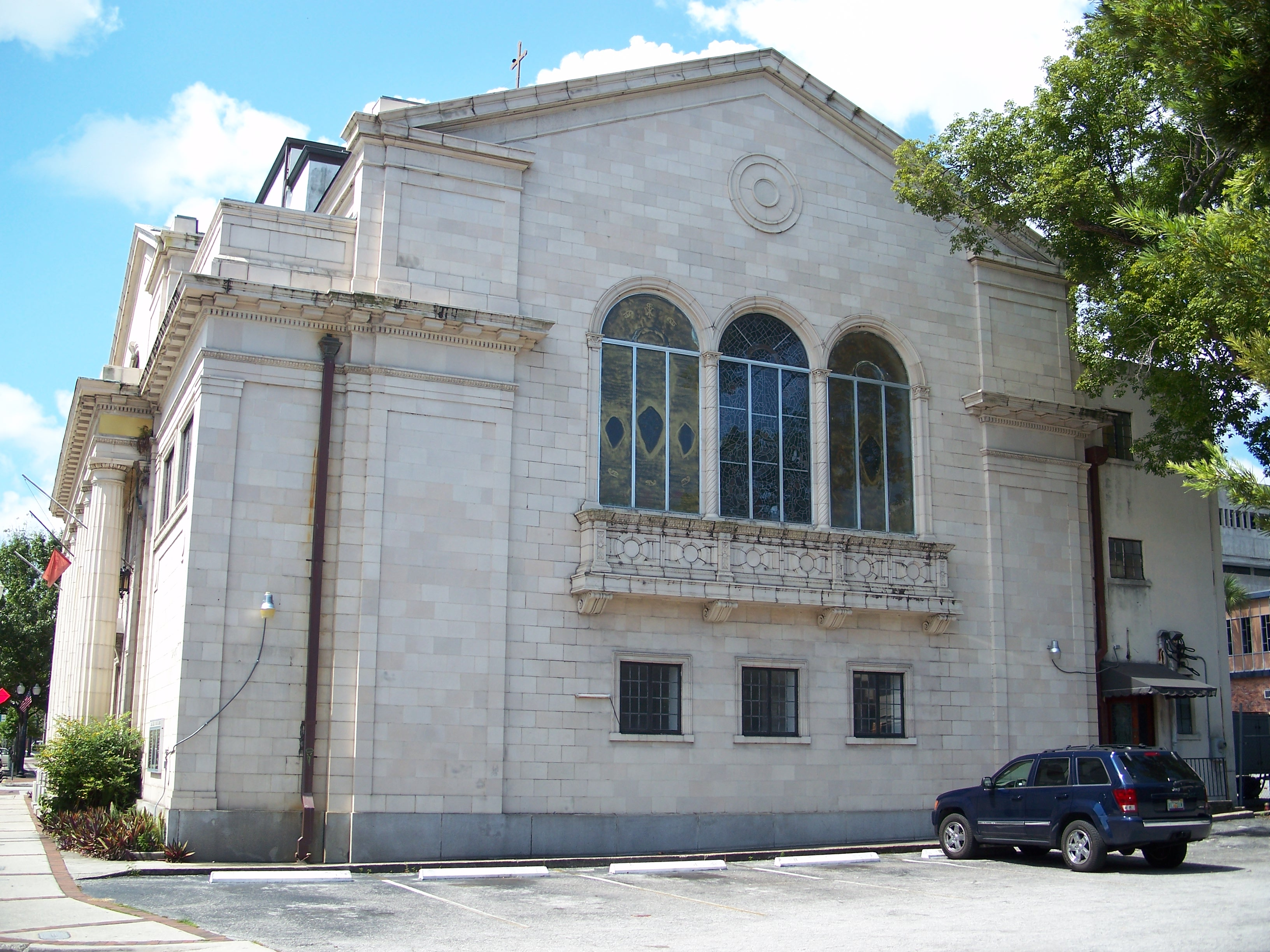
Side view

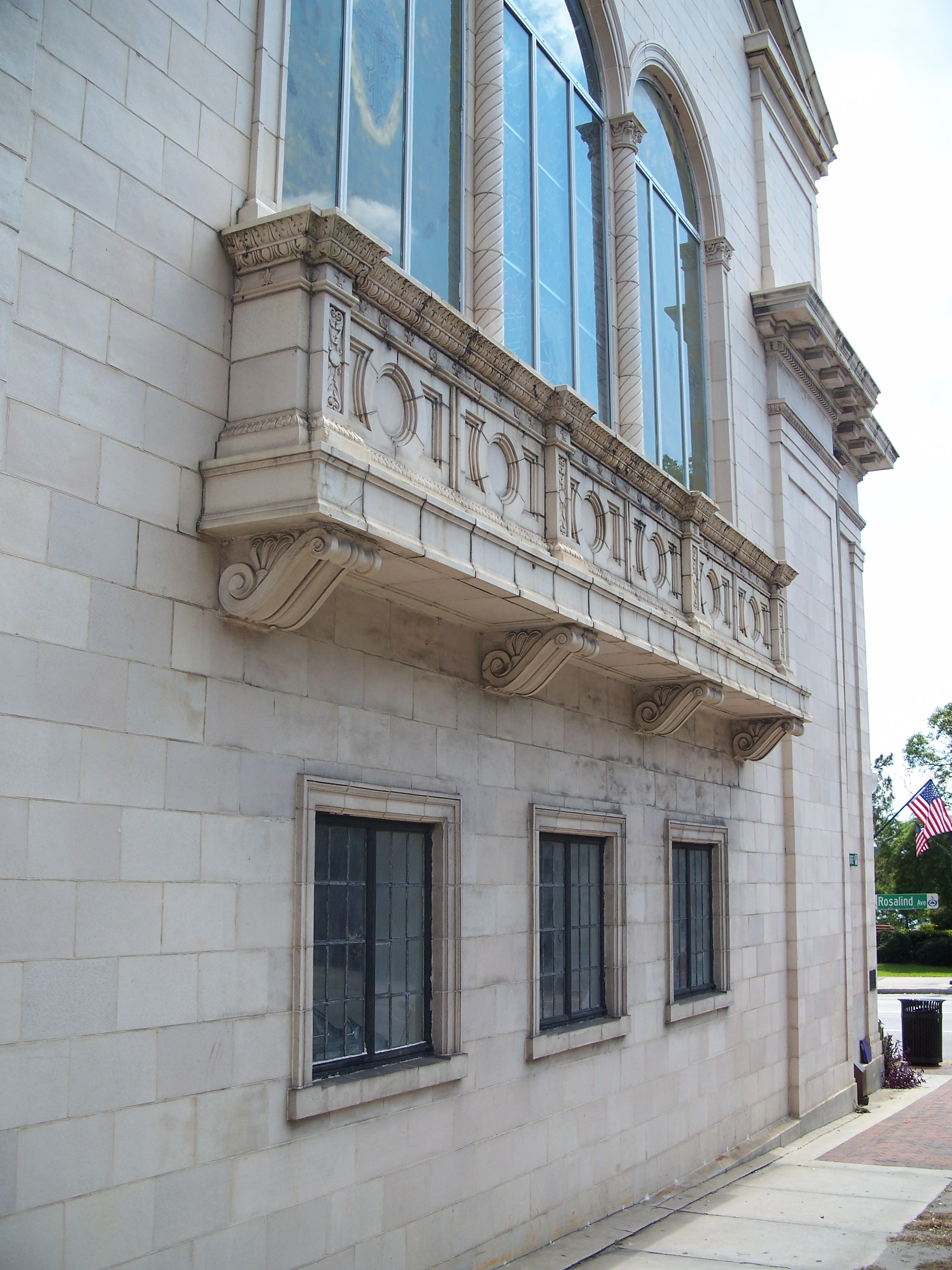
Side detail

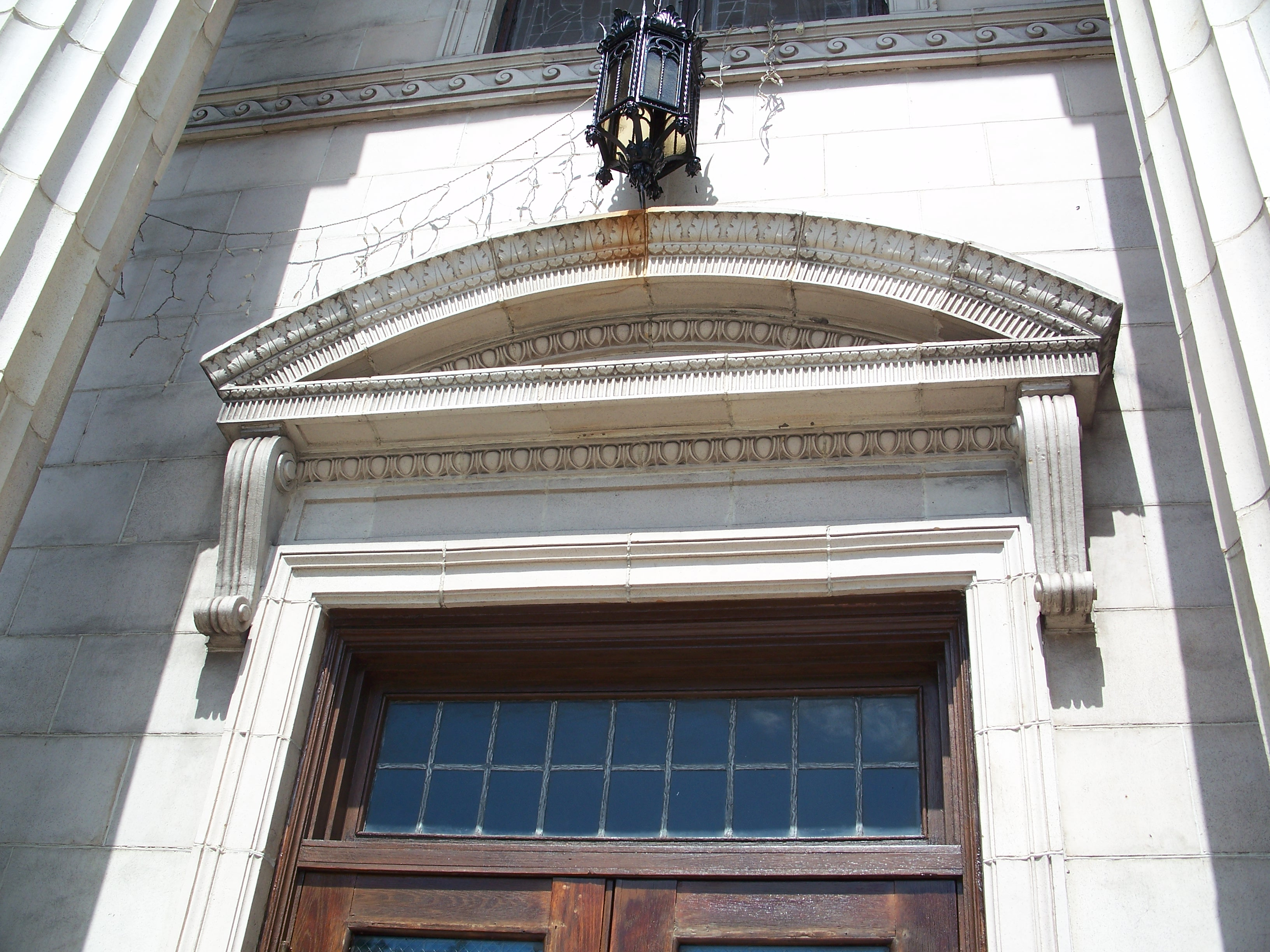
Entrance detail

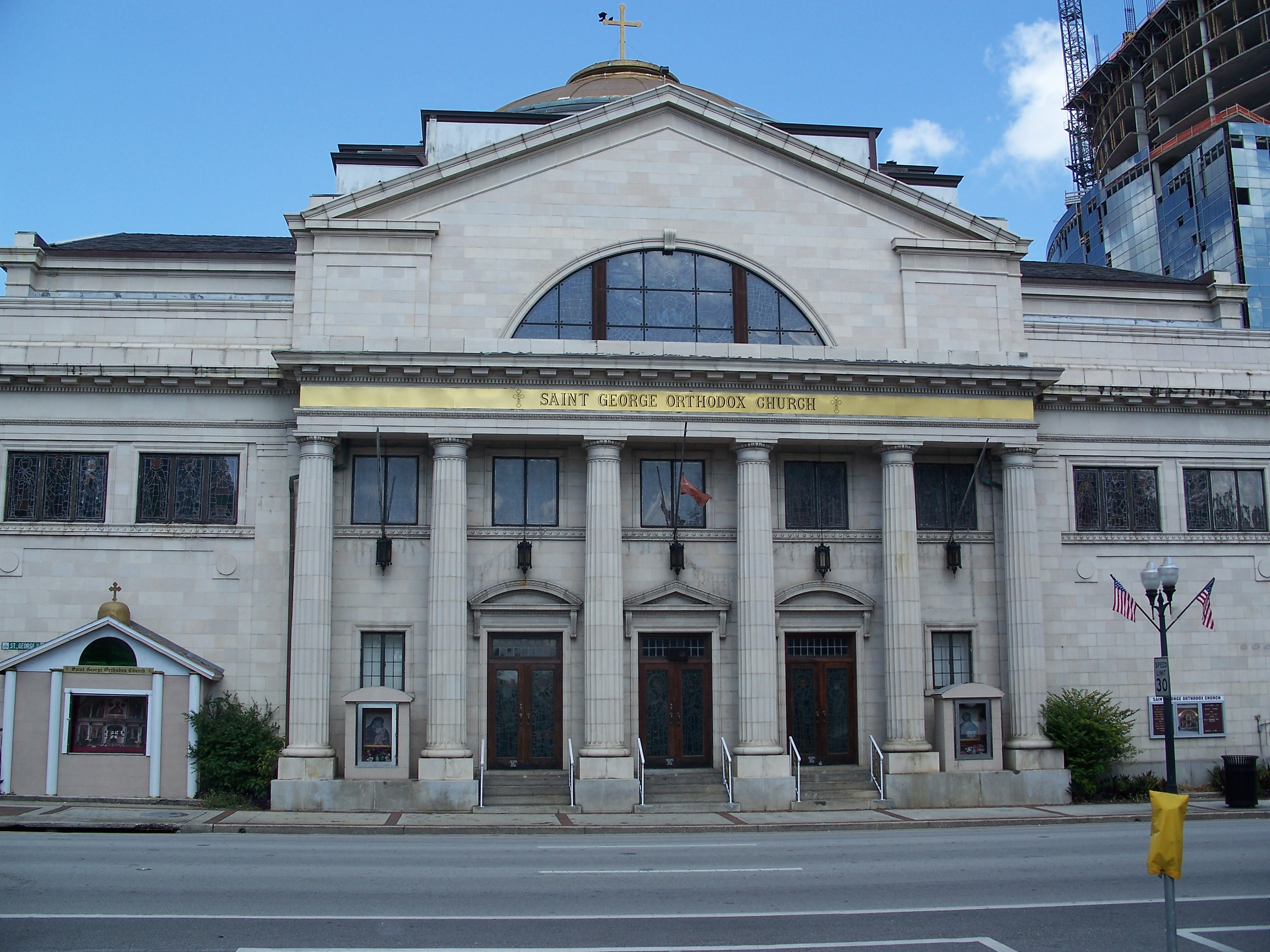
Another front view

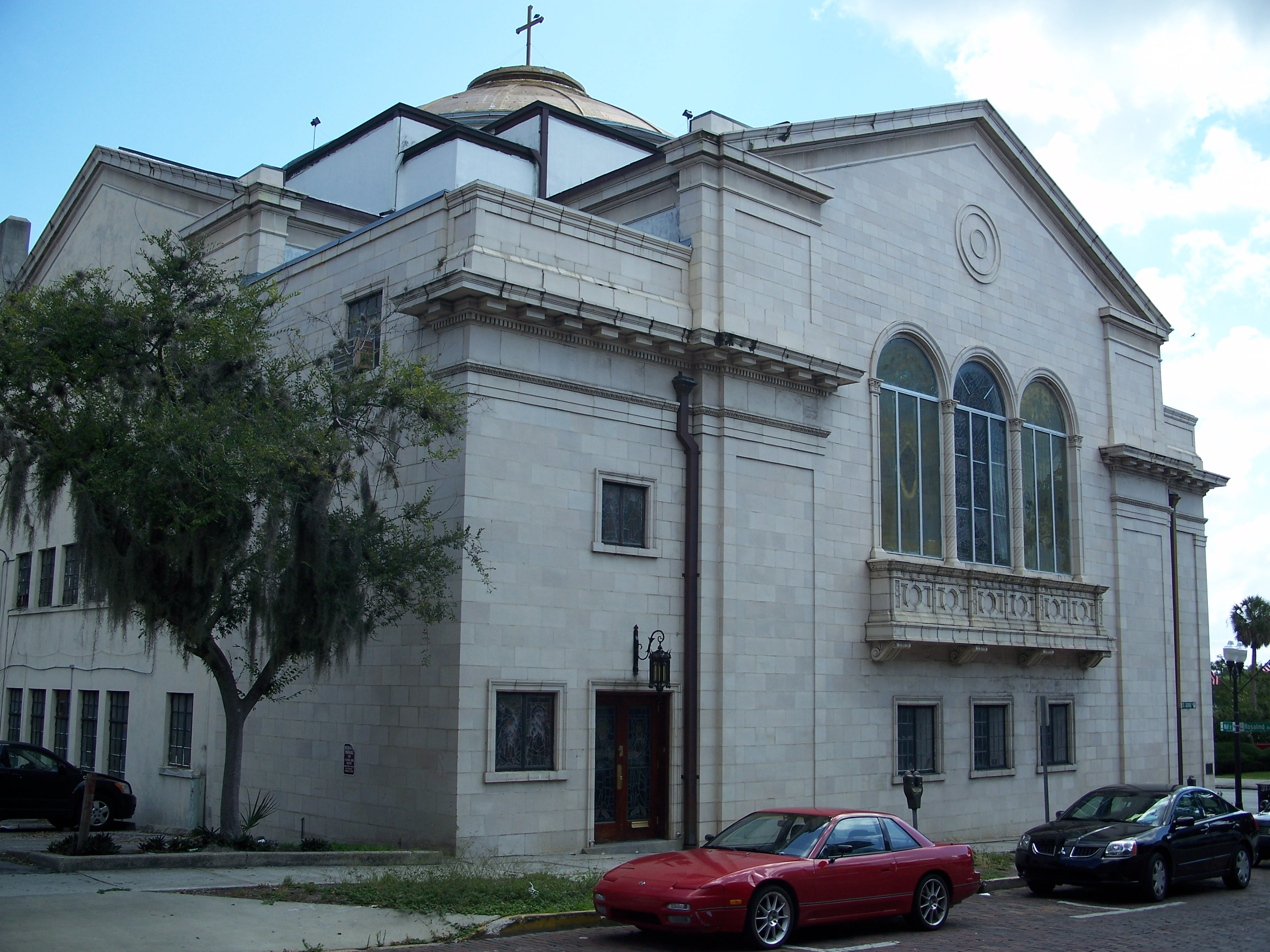
Another side view

== See also ==
- Greek Orthodox Patriarchate of Antioch
- List of Former Christian Science Churches, Societies and Buildings
