= Cal Palmer Memorial Building =

- U.S. National Register of Historic Places
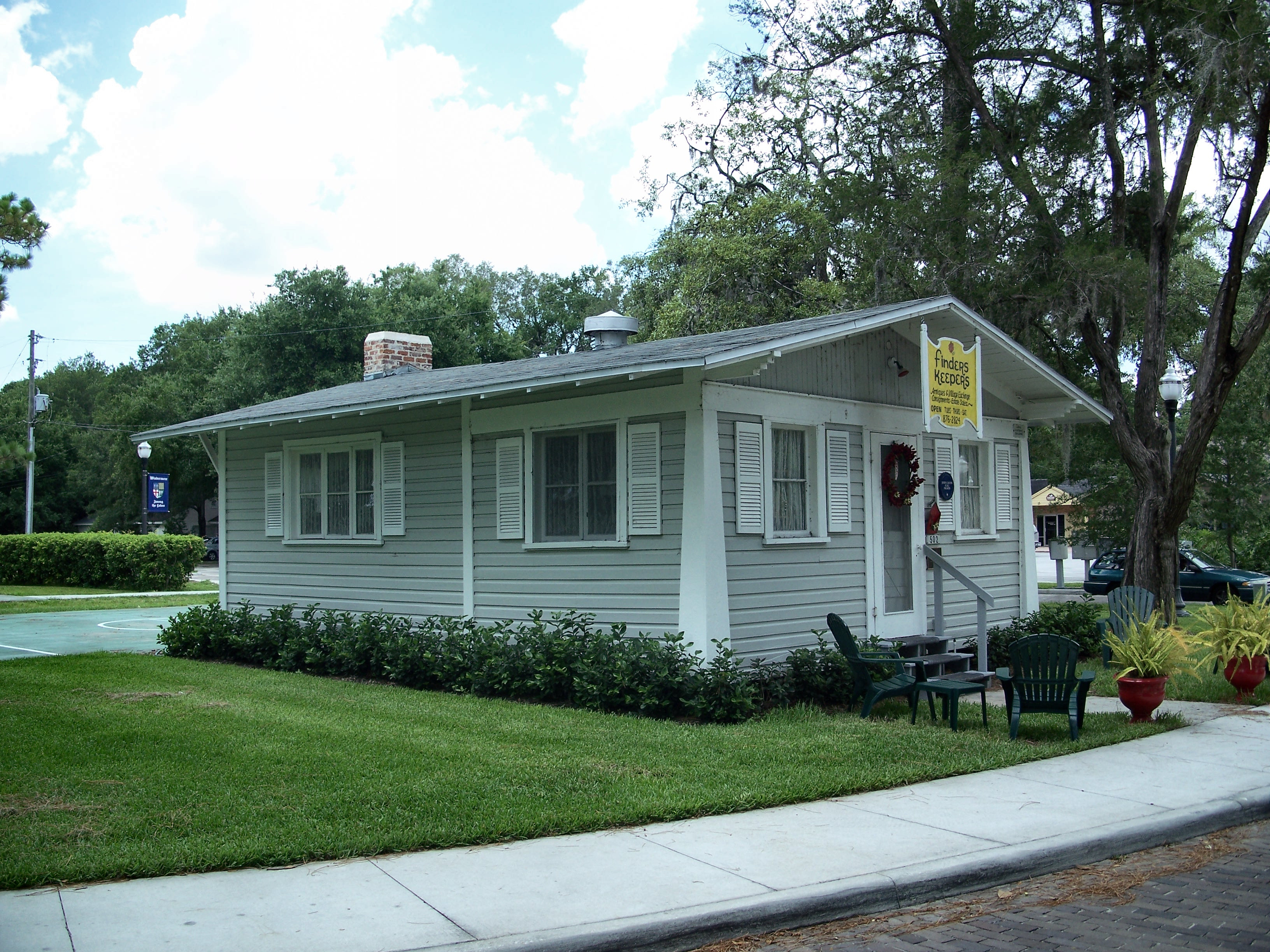

- Location within Florida Location within the United States
- Location: Windermere, Florida
- Coordinates: 28°29′43″N 81°32′7″W
- Built: 1911
- NRHP reference No.: 95001364
- Added to NRHP: 29 November 1995

The Cal Palmer Memorial Building (also known as Finders Keepers) is a historic site in Windermere, Florida. It is located at 502 Main Street. On November 29, 1995, it was added to the U.S. National Register of Historic Places.
