= Interlachen Avenue Historic District =

Historic district in Florida, United States

- U.S. National Register of Historic Places
- U.S. Historic district
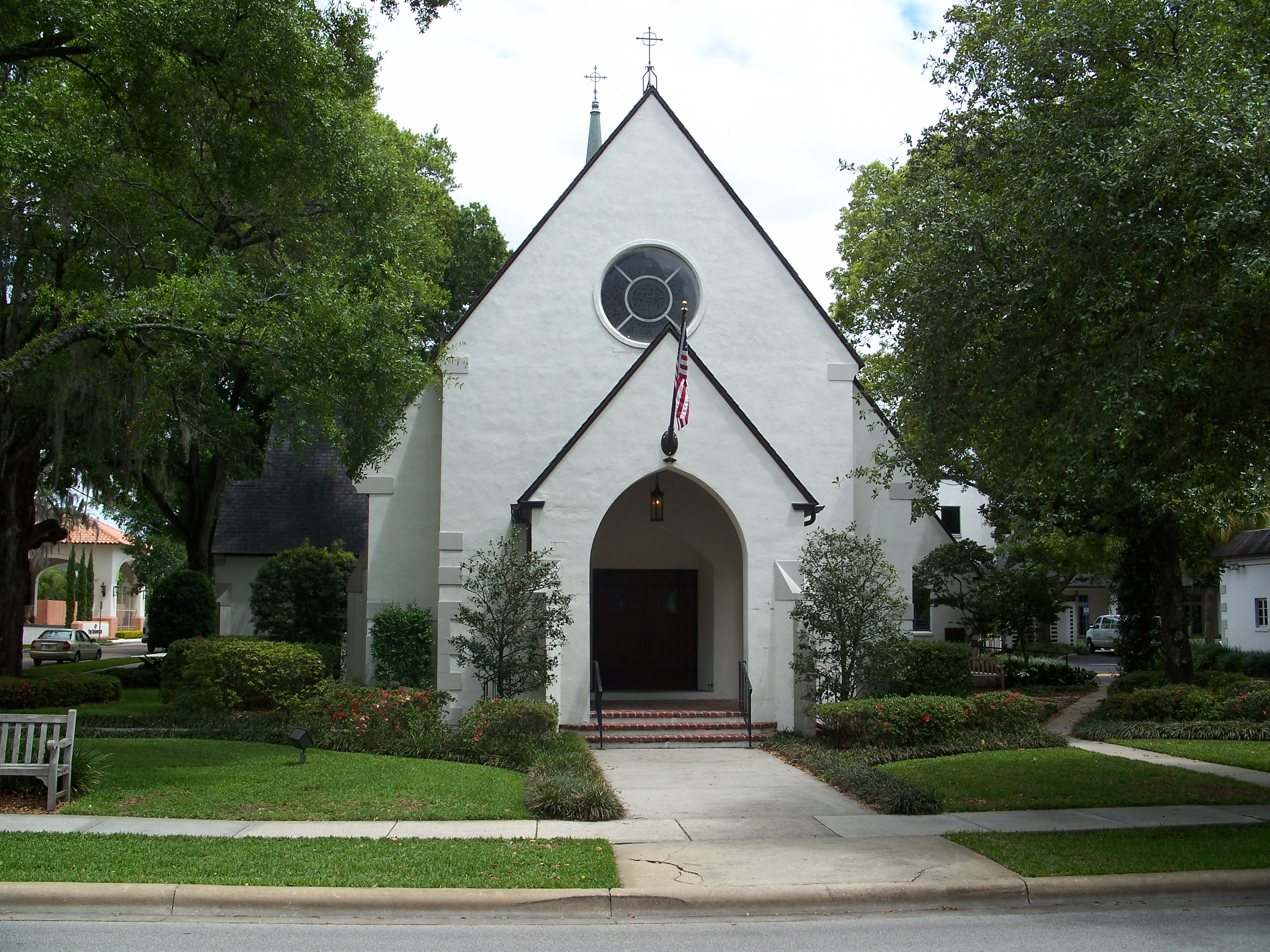
- All Saints Episcopal Church

- Location within Florida Location within the United States
- Location: Winter Park, Florida
- Coordinates: 28°35′58″N 81°20′55″W
- Built: 1882
- Architect: James Gamble Rogers II, George H. Spohn
- Architectural style: Mission, Spanish Revival, Modern Movement
- MPS: "Interlachen Avenue Historic District" (PDF). City of Winter Park.
- NRHP reference No.: 11000861
- Added to NRHP: November 30, 2011

Interlachen Avenue Historic District is a national historic district in Winter Park, Florida, Orange County. Including buildings constructed from 1882 through 1964, it is bounded by Canton Avenue on the north, Knowles Avenue on the west, Lake Osceola on the east, and New England Avenue on the south.

It was added to the National Register of Historic Places in 2011.
