= Siegmund and Marilyn Goldman House =

Historic house in Florida, United States

- U.S. National Register of Historic Places
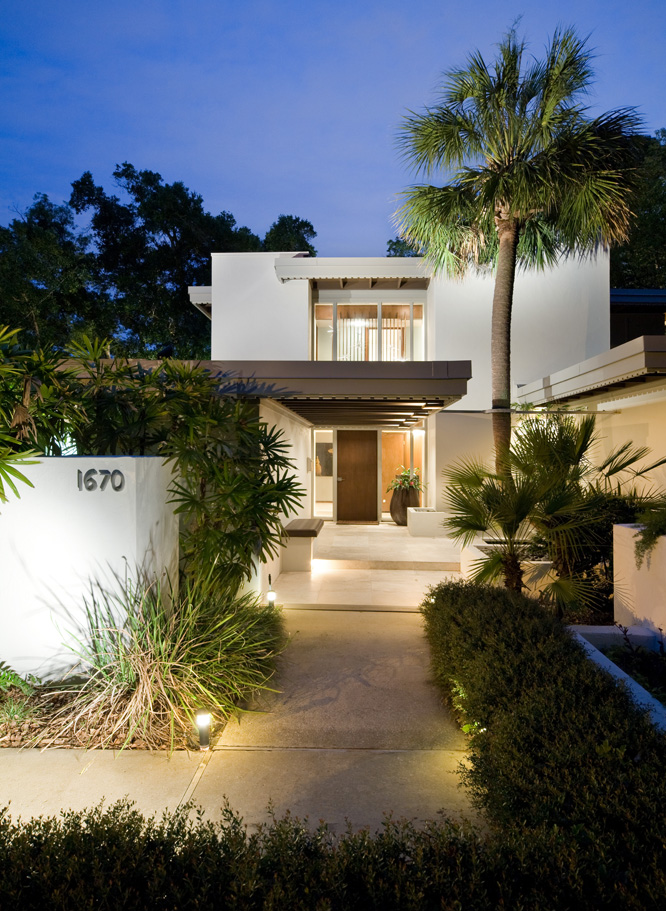
- Goldman house in 2017

- Location within Florida Location within the United States
- Location: 1670 Huron Trail; Maitland, Florida
- Coordinates: 28.6345°N 81.3481°W
- Built: 1960
- Architect: Nils M. Schweizer
- Architectural style: Mid-century modern
- NRHP reference No.: 100003411
- Added to NRHP: February 4, 2019

The Siegmund and Marilyn Goldman House is listed in the National Register of Historic Places in Orange County, Florida. It is located in the city of Maitland, an Orlando suburb, and was designed in 1964 by architect Nils M. Schweizer. It is a mid-century modern building inspired by designs of Frank Lloyd Wright.

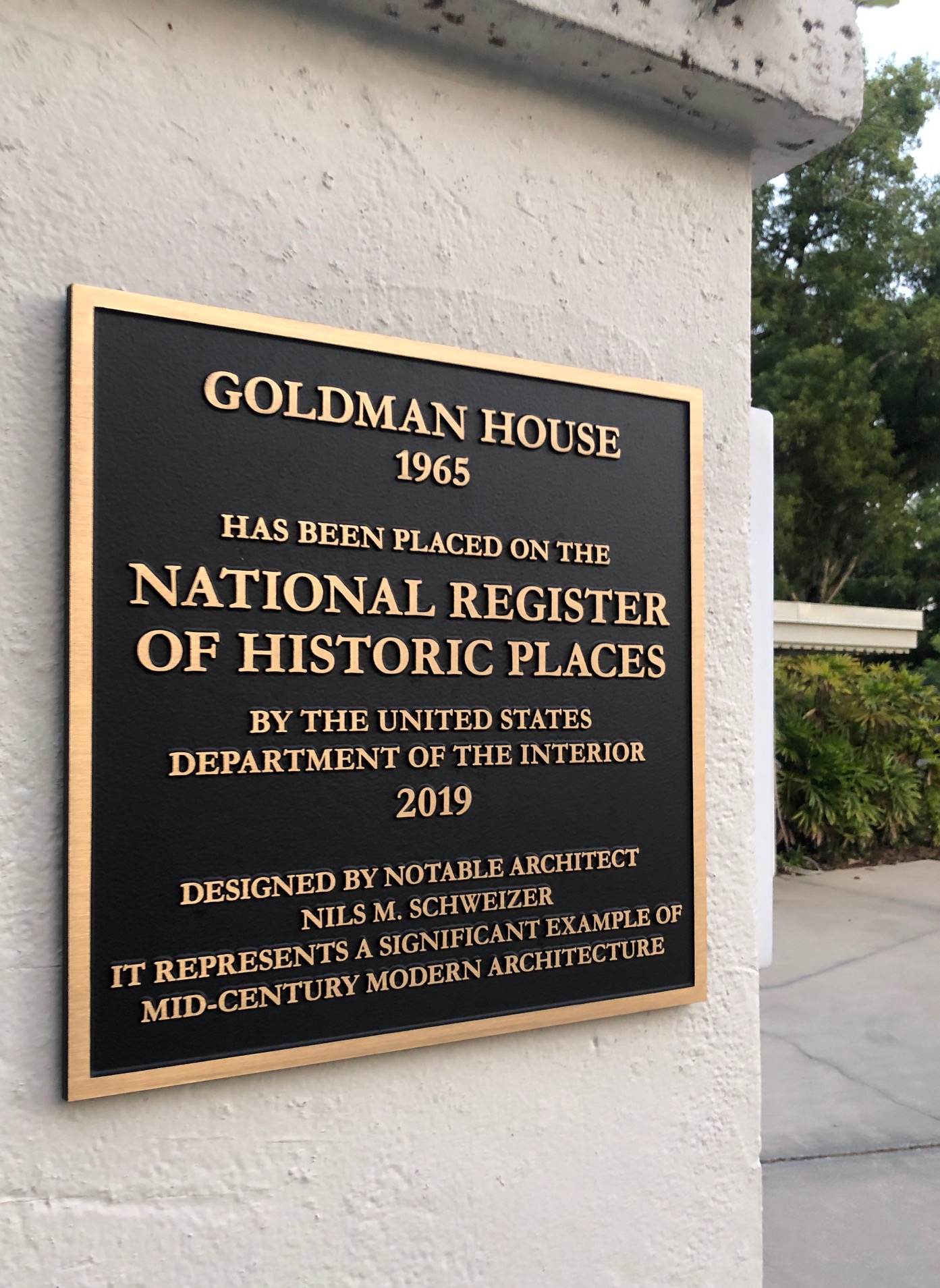
National Register Plaque
