= John N. Huttig Estate =

Historic house in Florida, United States

- U.S. National Register of Historic Places
- Location within Florida Location within the United States
- Location: Orlando, Florida
- Coordinates: 28°33′14″N 81°23′10″W
- Built: 1934
- Architectural style: Tudor Revival
- NRHP reference No.: 91001776
- Added to NRHP: January 21, 1993

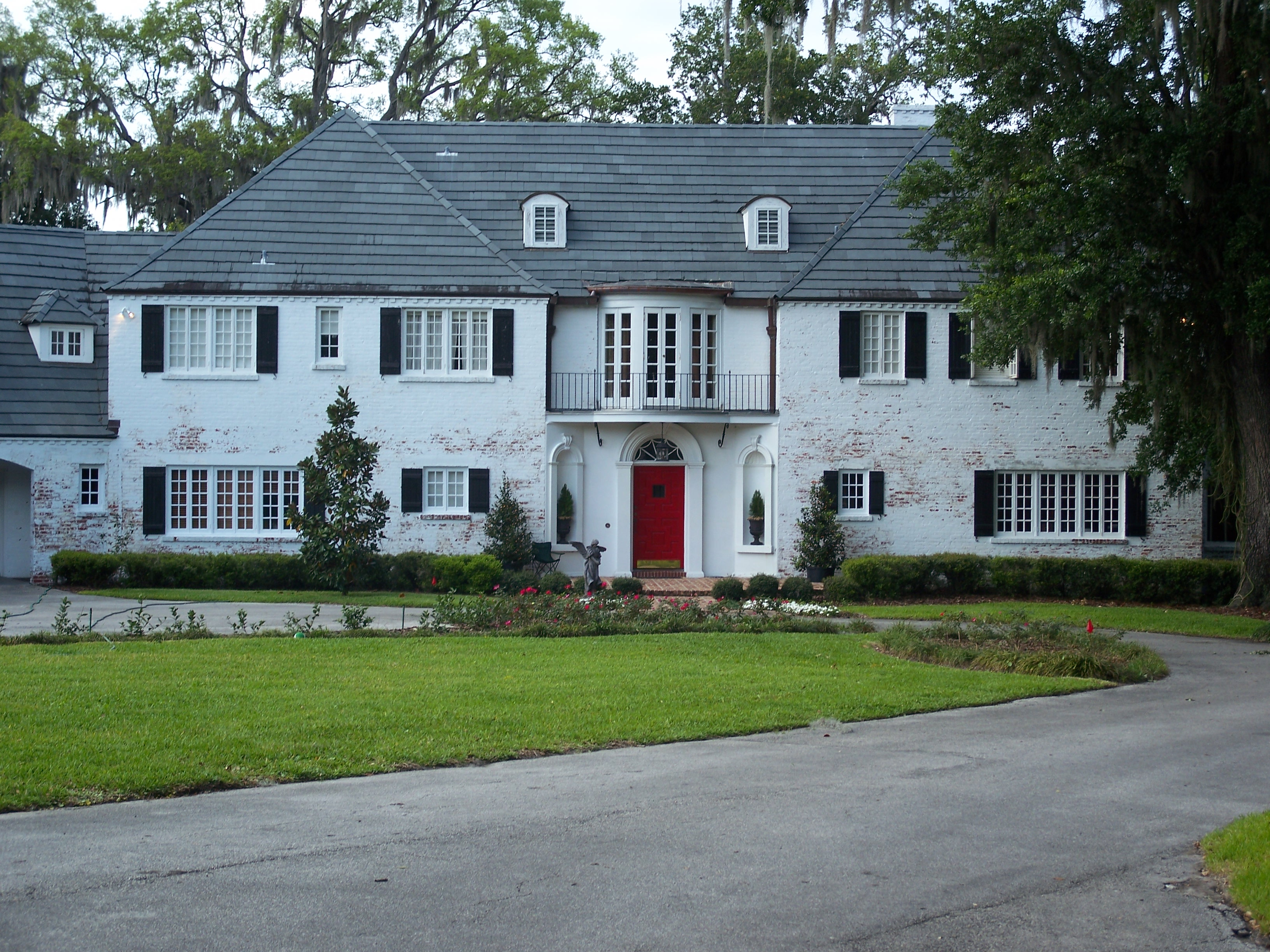
Orlando Huttig Estate01.jpg

The John N. Huttig Estate is a historic home in Orlando, Florida. It was located at 435 Peachtree Road. On January 21, 1993, it was added to the U.S. National Register of Historic Places. The home was designed by architect James Gamble Rogers II and completed in 1935.
