= Windermere Town Hall =

- U.S. National Register of Historic Places
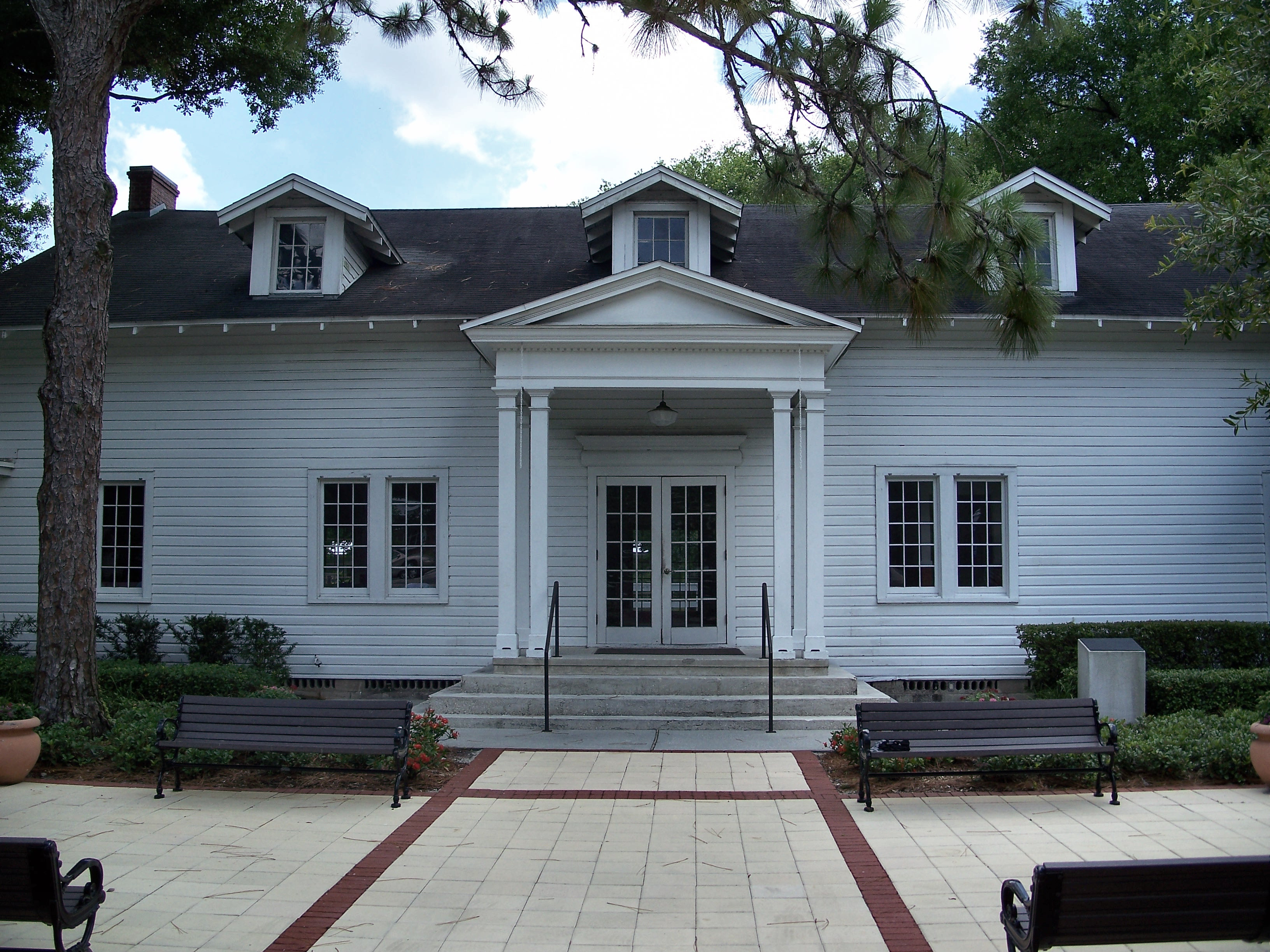

- Location within Florida Location within the United States
- Location: Windermere, Florida United States
- Coordinates: 28°29′42″N 81°32′10″W
- Built: 1922
- Architectural style: Colonial Revival
- NRHP reference No.: 94000539
- Added to NRHP: June 3, 1994

The Windermere Town Hall (also known as the Old Windermere Women's Club) is a historic site in Windermere, Florida, United States. It is located at 520 Main Street, and built in 1922. On June 3, 1994, it was added to the U.S. National Register of Historic Places.
