= 1890 Windermere School =

- U.S. National Register of Historic Places
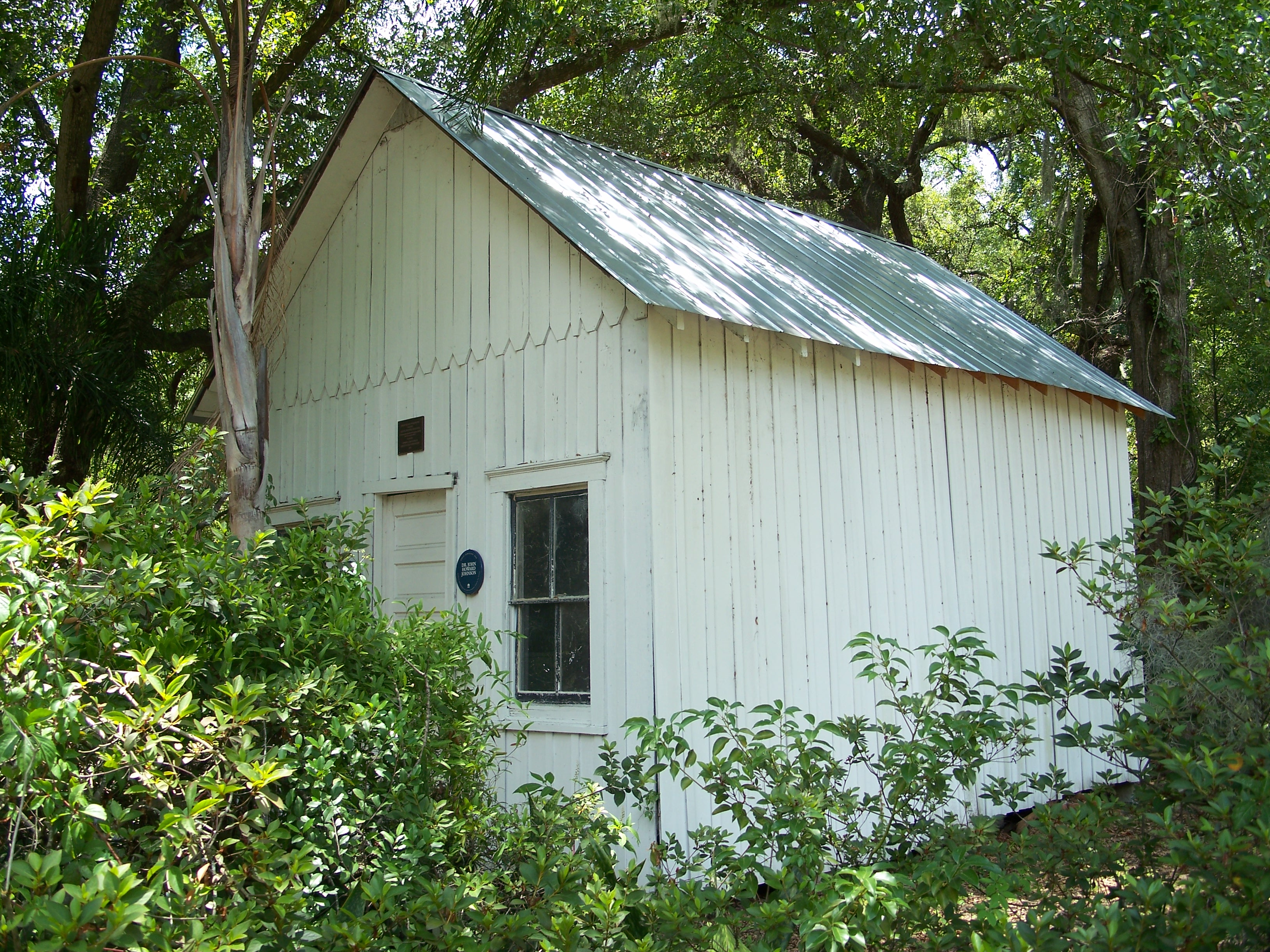

- Location within Florida Location within the United States
- Location: Windermere, Florida
- Coordinates: 28°29′35″N 81°32′7″W
- Built: 1890
- NRHP reference No.: 03000509
- Added to NRHP: June 5, 2003

The 1890 Windermere School (also known as the Armstrong-Parramore House) is a historic school in Windermere, Florida, United States. The schoolhouse is located at 113 West Seventh Avenue. The building served the community as a school between 1890 and 1916, then as a community center through 1923. After its days as a community center, it became a private residence. In 1995 the Armstrong-Parramore family, who owned the land and building, donated it to the city. Rooms and structures added to the building by the Armstrong-Parramores were dismantled, restoring the building to its original form. On June 5, 2003, it was added to the U.S. National Register of Historic Places. In 2011, the Windermere city government wished to move the historic building to another location. However, a movement arose to keep it in its current location. The issue was put to Windermere voters in the form of a town charter amendment. The amendment, which protected the schoolhouse from further move attempts, passed overwhelmingly with 71.25% of voters in favor.
