= Orlando Utilities Commission Administration Building =

- U.S. National Register of Historic Places
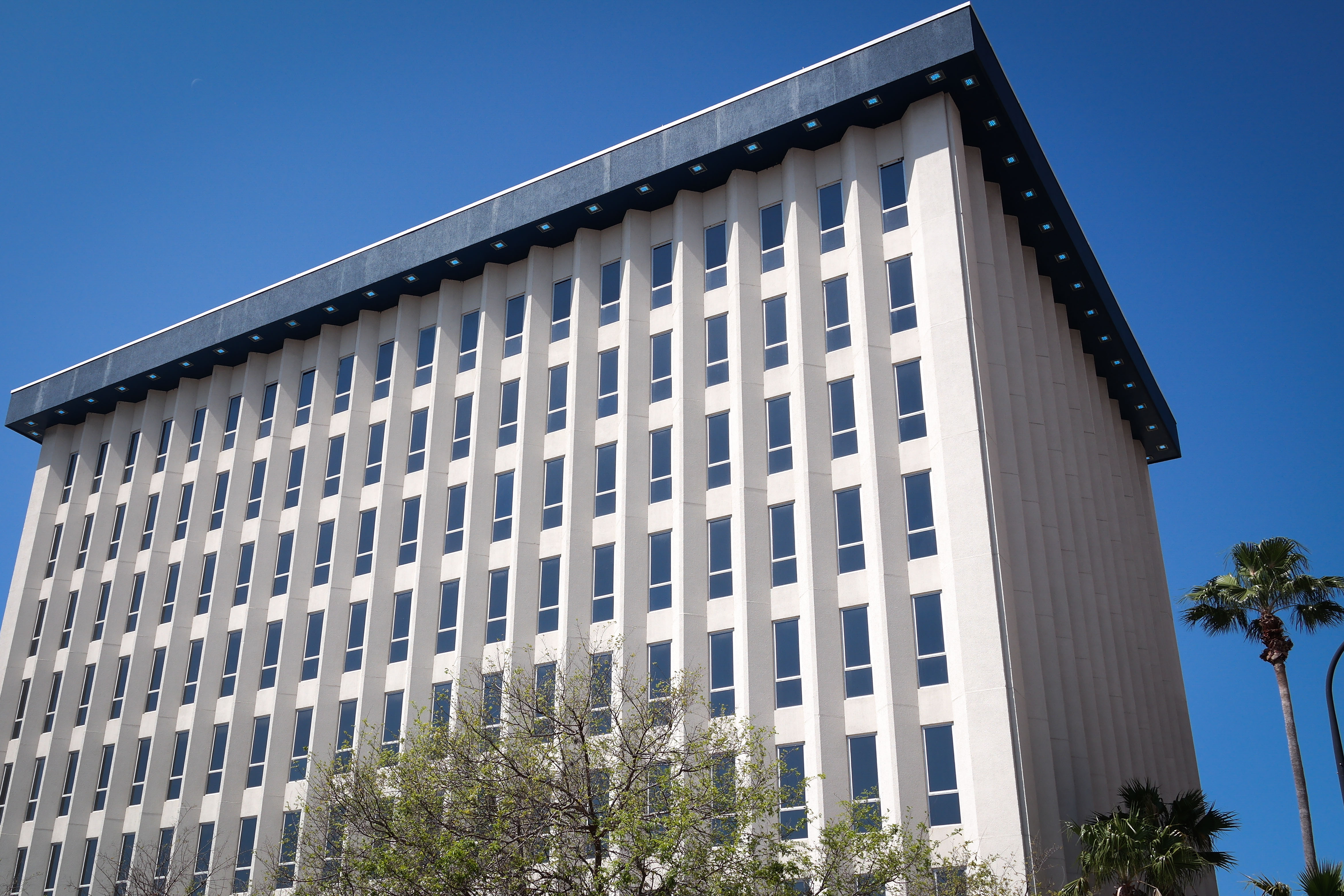
- A view of the building in 2014, now the Aloft Hotel

- Location within Florida Location within the United States
- Location: Orlando, Florida
- Coordinates: 28.536609°N 81.378688°W
- Built: 1967
- Architect: Richard Boone Rodgers
- Architectural style: Modern
- NRHP reference No.: 12000321
- Added to NRHP: June 7, 2012

The Orlando Utilities Commission Administration Building is an historic eight-story Modern style building in Orlando, Florida. It began to be used in 1967. It was built by the Orlando Utilities Commission to handle the projected increased volume that would be generated when the University of Central Florida and Walt Disney World started operating. The building was designed by Richard Boone Rodgers.

After the Commission built a new headquarters nearby and moved there, the old Administration Building stood empty for several years. In 2011, it was purchased by a company who turned it into a boutique hotel (currently Aloft Orlando Downtown). The building was added to the National Register of Historic Places on June 7, 2012.
