= Thomas Picton Warlow Sr. House =

Historic house in Florida, United States

- U.S. National Register of Historic Places
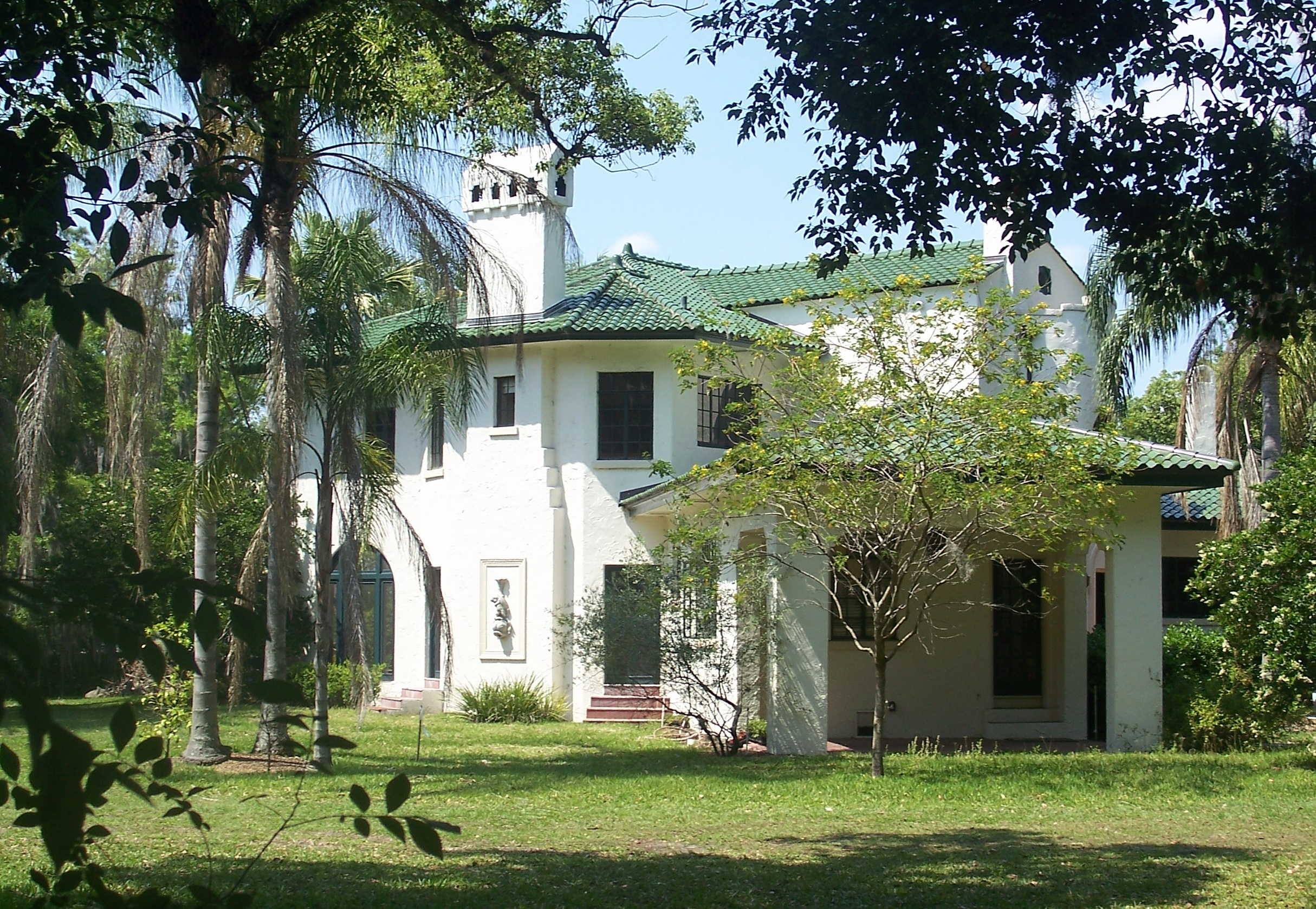

- Location within Florida Location within the United States
- Location: Winter Park, Florida
- Coordinates: 28°35′30″N 81°23′05″W
- Built: 1927
- Architectural style: Mission, Spanish Revival
- NRHP reference No.: 09000808
- Added to NRHP: October 8, 2009

Thomas Picton Warlow Sr. House is a national historic site located at 701 Driver Avenue, Winter Park, Florida in Orange County.

Construction on the house was completed in 1927, and it was added to the National Register of Historic Places in 2009.
