= Dr. P. Phillips House =

Historic house in Florida, United States

- U.S. National Register of Historic Places
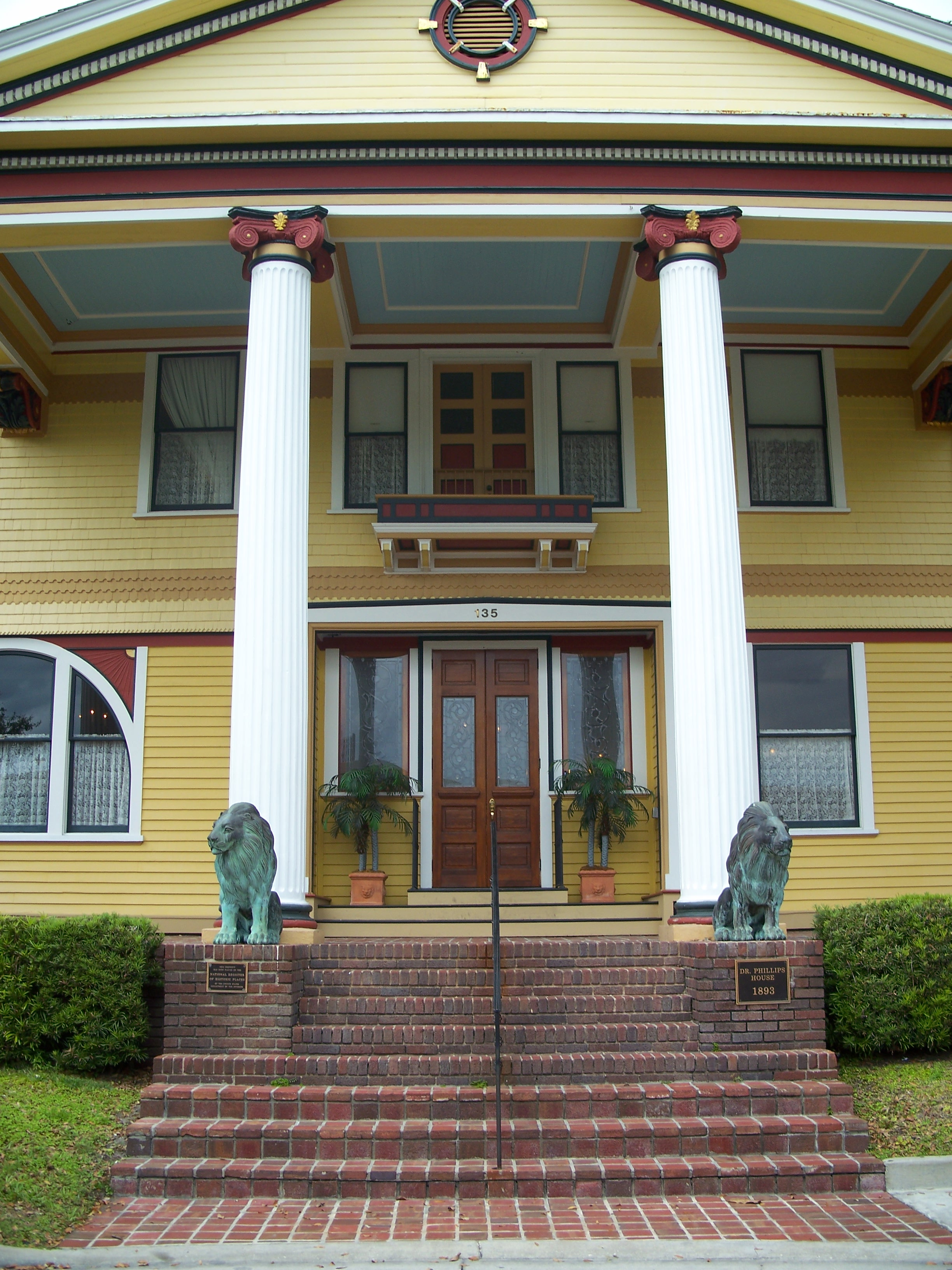

- Location within Florida Location within the United States
- Location: Orlando, Florida
- Coordinates: 28°32′8″N 81°22′34″W
- Built: 1893
- Architect: L. M. Boykin
- Architectural style: Shingle Style
- NRHP reference No.: 79000685
- Added to NRHP: July 10, 1979

The Dr. P. Phillips House (also known as the Peleg Peckham House) is a historic home in Orlando, Florida. It is located at 135 Lucerne Circle, Northeast. The home was built in 1893, at the behest of Colonel Peleg Peckham (from nearby Winter Park). He actually presented it as a wedding present for his daughter. This house was purchased by Dr. Philip Phillips in 1912, a prominent figure in the citrus agricultural industry in Central Florida, where he resided until his death in 1959.

On July 10, 1979, it was added to the U.S. National Register of Historic Places. This historic home is currently utilized as an elegant banquet hall. It is exemplary of the city's Shingle architectural style.
