= Windermere, Florida =

Town in Florida, United States

- Town
- Town of Windermere
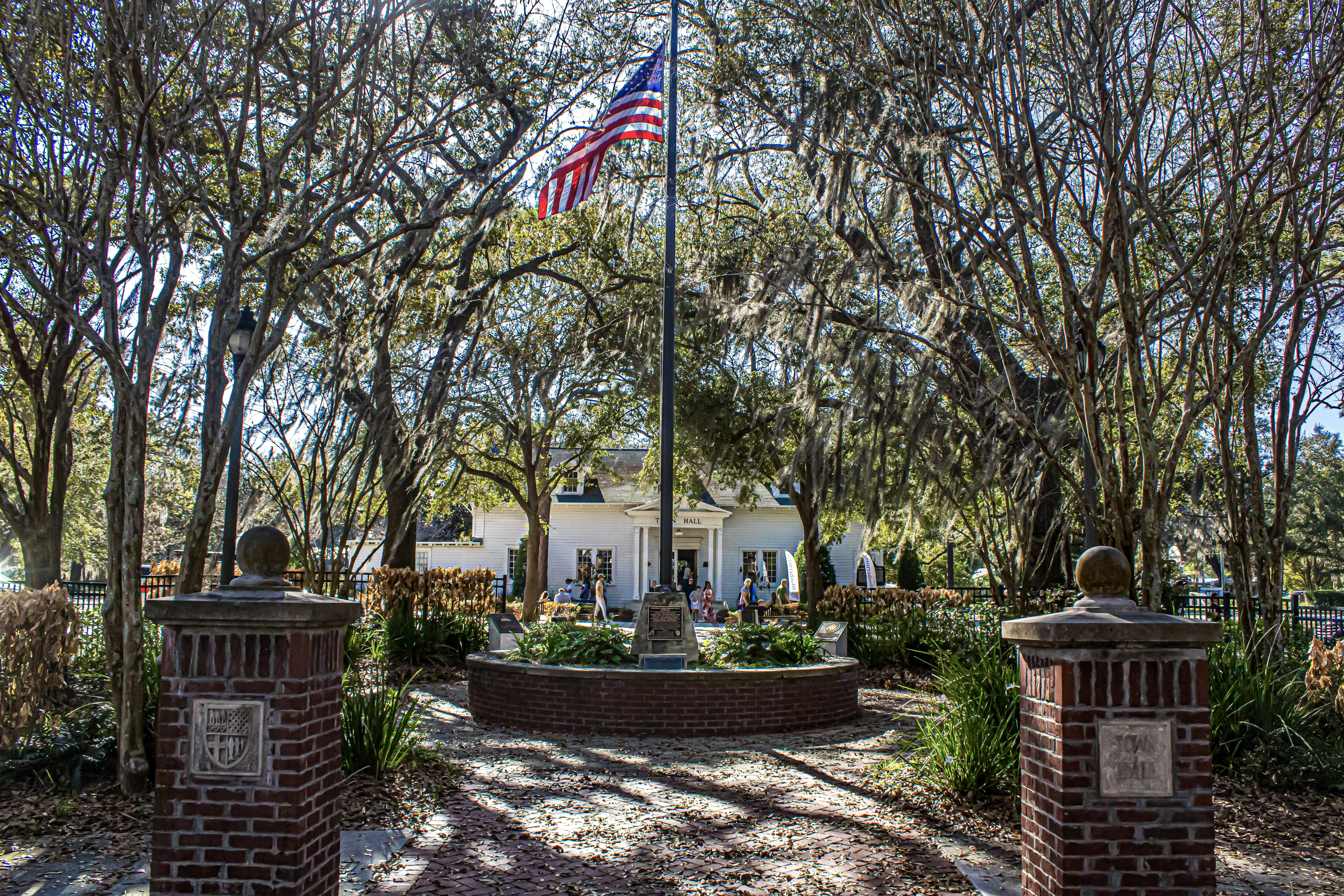
- Downtown Windermere's courtyard in front of the Windermere Town Hall

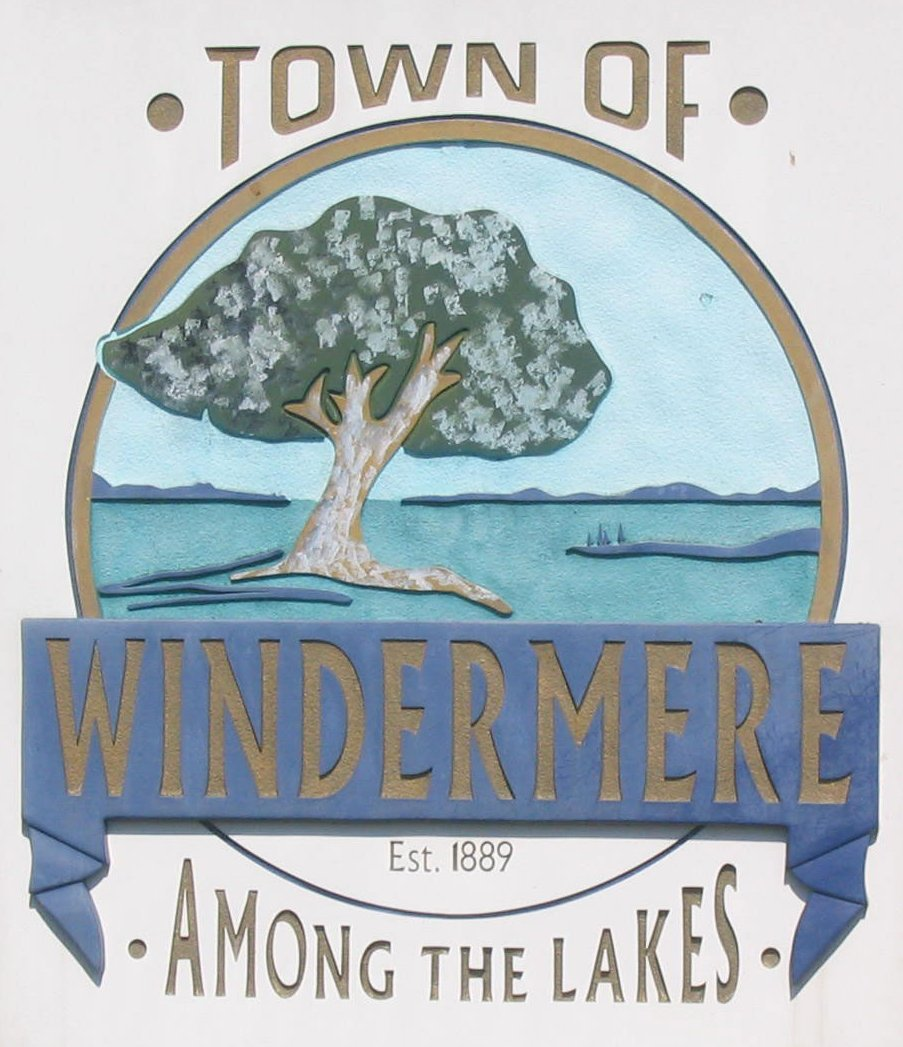
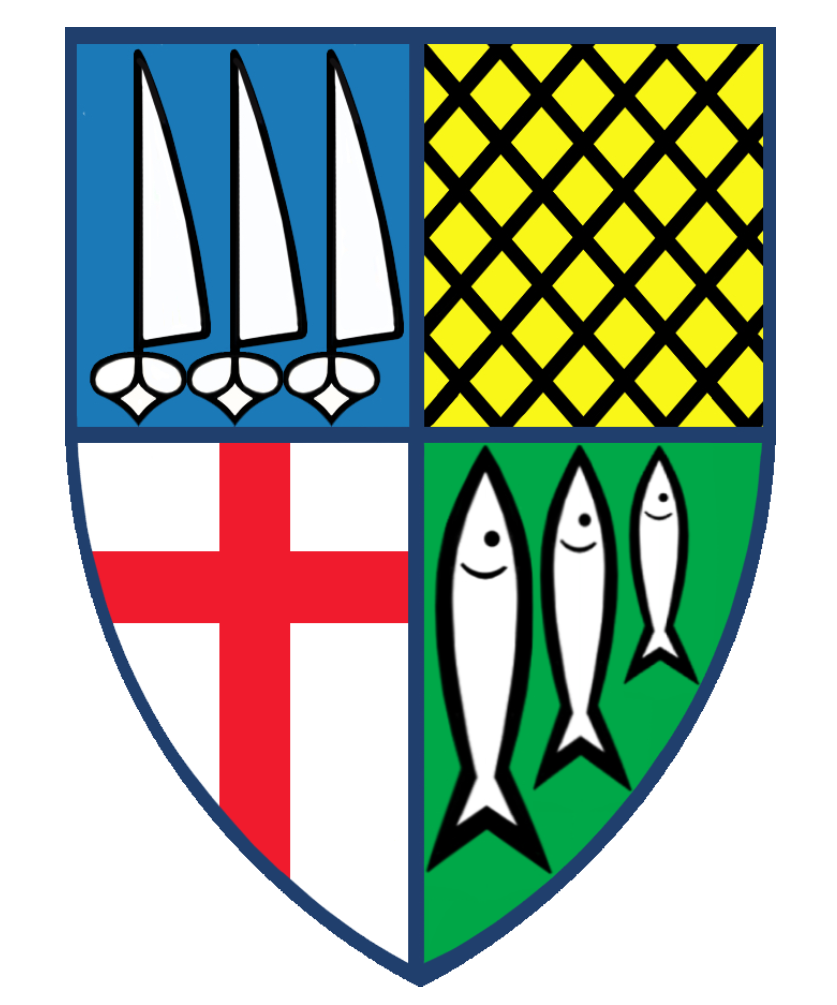
- Seal Coat of arms
- Motto: "Among The Lakes"
- Location in Orange County and the state of Florida
- Coordinates: 28°29′50″N 81°32′02″W
- Country: United States
- State: Florida
- County: Orange
- Settled: 1887
- Incorporated: February 2, 1925
- Named after: Windermere, England

Government
  - Type: Council-Manager
  - Mayor: Loren “Andy” Williams
  - Council Members: Mandy David, Tony Davit, Catherine "CT" Allen, Tom Stroup, and Brandi Haines
  - Town Manager: Robert Smith
  - Town Clerk: Dorothy Burkhalter
  - Town Attorney: Heather M. Ramos

Area
  - Total: 2.69 sq mi (6.96 km^{2})
  - Land: 1.93 sq mi (5.01 km^{2})
  - Water: 0.75 sq mi (1.95 km^{2})
- Elevation: 102 ft (31 m)

Population (2020)
  - Total: 3,030
  - Density: 1,567.4/sq mi (605.16/km^{2})
- Time zone: UTC-5 (Eastern (EST))
  - Summer (DST): UTC-4 (EDT)
- ZIP code: 34786
- Area codes: 407, 689
- FIPS code: 12-78050
- GNIS feature ID: 2406897
- Website: www.town.windermere.fl.us

Windermere is a town in Orange County, Florida, United States. As of the 2020 census, the town population was 3,030. It is situated on an isthmus between Lake Down and Lake Butler, and is part of the Orlando Metropolitan Statistical Area.

== History ==
In 1887, the town was founded by John Dawe, an Englishman who platted the community and named it after Windermere, a lake in the Lake District in Cumbria, England.

A post office opened in Windermere in 1888. The post office closed in 1901, and reopened in 1911. Windermere was established as a residential development in 1889.

The Town of Windermere was officially incorporated as a municipality on February 2, 1925.

During late 2007, the town of Windermere filed a proposal to annex Isleworth and Butler Bay, both wealthy subdivisions. This was met with extensive debate from town residents and an objection from Orange County, which stood to lose millions of dollars of property tax revenue. After lengthy discussions, and battles with the county, Isleworth remained unincorporated, but Butler Bay was annexed into Windermere, with over 90% of its residents approving annexation via a mail-in ballot.

== Geography ==
According to the United States Census Bureau, the town has a total area of 1.57 square miles (4.07 km^{2}), of which 1.56 square miles (4.03 km^{2}) is land and 0.015 square miles (0.04 km^{2}), or 0.98%, is water.

=== Climate ===
The Town of Windermere is part of the humid subtropical climate zone with a Köppen Climate Classification of "Cfa" (C = mild temperate, f = fully humid, and a = hot summer).

The record high temperature in Windermere is 101 °F, which took place in 1998, and the record low temperature is 19 °F, which took place in 1985.

== Demographics ==
Historical population
Census	Pop.	Note	%±
1930	181		—
1940	163		−9.9%
1950	317		94.5%
1960	576		81.7%
1970	894		55.2%
1980	1,302		45.6%
1990	1,371		5.3%
2000	1,897		38.4%
2010	2,462		29.8%
2020	3,030		23.1%
U.S. Decennial Census

=== Racial and ethnic composition ===
Windermere racial composition (Hispanics excluded from racial categories) (NH = Non-Hispanic)
Race	Pop 2010	Pop 2020	% 2010	% 2020
White (NH)	2,204	2,376	89.52%	78.42%
Black or African American (NH)	35	60	1.42%	1.98%
Native American or Alaska Native (NH)	0	3	0.00%	0.10%
Asian (NH)	73	127	2.97%	4.19%
Pacific Islander or Native Hawaiian (NH)	0	2	0.00%	0.07%
Some other race (NH)	2	25	0.08%	0.83%
Two or more races/multiracial (NH)	23	165	0.93%	5.45%
Hispanic or Latino (any race)	125	272	5.08%	8.98%
Total	2,462	3,030		

=== 2020 census ===
As of the 2020 census, Windermere had a population of 3,030. The median age was 47.7 years. 21.7% of residents were under the age of 18 and 19.0% of residents were 65 years of age or older. For every 100 females there were 97.0 males, and for every 100 females age 18 and over there were 95.9 males age 18 and over.

As of 2020, 100.0% of residents lived in urban areas, while 0.0% lived in rural areas.

In 2020, there were 1,089 households in Windermere, of which 36.4% had children under the age of 18 living in them. Of all households, 72.4% were married-couple households, 9.1% were households with a male householder and no spouse or partner present, and 14.2% were households with a female householder and no spouse or partner present. About 11.3% of all households were made up of individuals and 6.5% had someone living alone who was 65 years of age or older.

In 2020, there were 1,155 housing units, of which 5.7% were vacant. The homeowner vacancy rate was 1.6% and the rental vacancy rate was 5.1%.

The 2016–2020 American Community Survey reported 1,047 families in the town.

=== 2010 census ===
As of the 2010 United States census, there were 2,462 people, 875 households, and 770 families residing in the town.

== Government ==
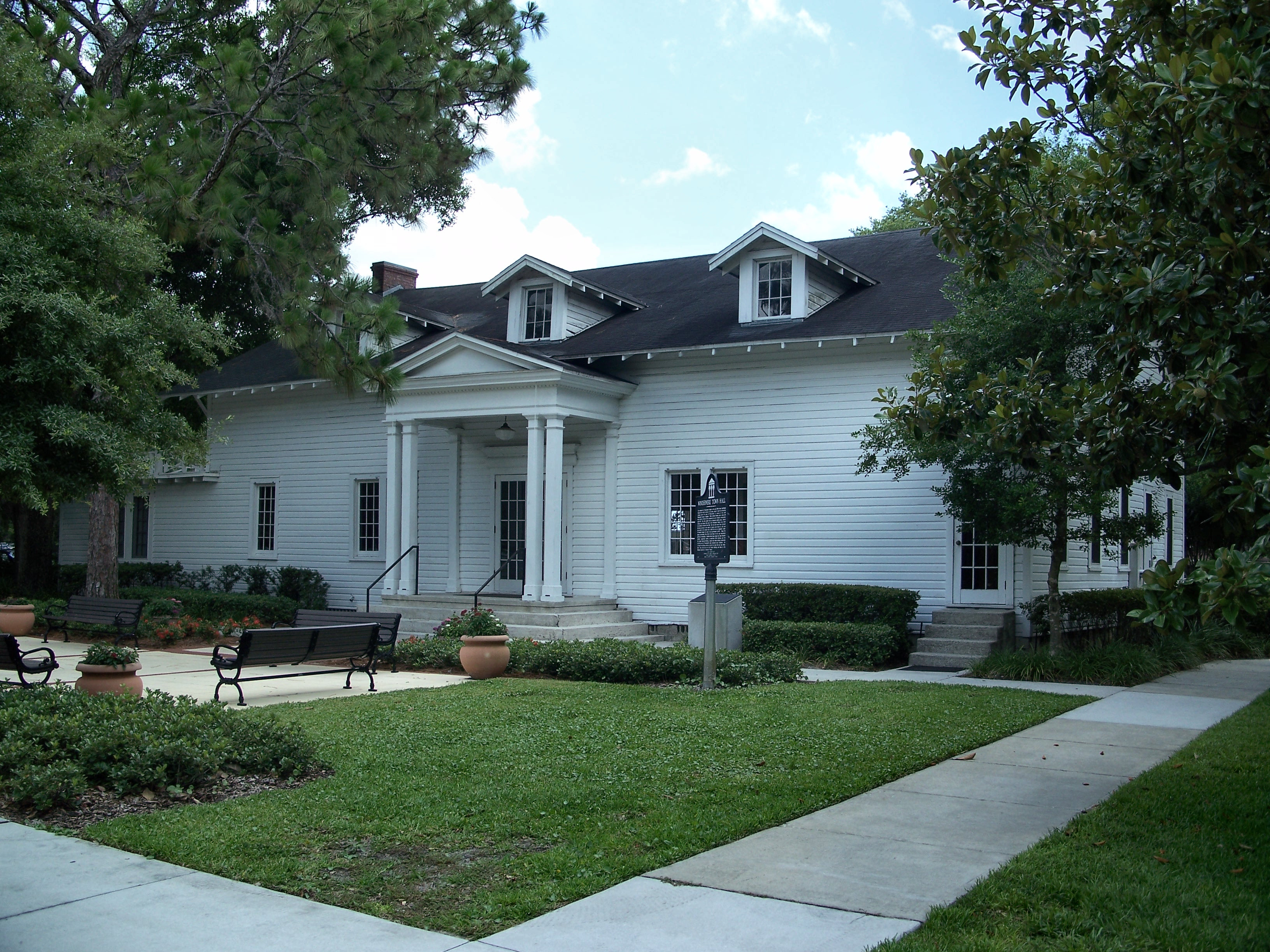
Windermere Town Hall

Windermere has a town manager / city council form of government. Five council members are elected at large for two-year terms, with three running for election in odd years and two running for election in even years along with the mayor.

Police services are provided by the Windermere Police Department.

Fire rescue and emergency medical services are provided by the Ocoee Fire Department. Postal services are provided by the Windermere Post Office. The Floridan Aquifer is Windermere and Orange County's source of drinking and fire hydrant water, which is filtered naturally through hundreds of feet of sand and rock, and then treated by the Orange County Water Division.

== Education ==
The community is within Orange County Public Schools (OCPS). Residents of the city itself are served by Windermere Elementary School, Gotha Middle School, and Olympia High School.

Windermere Preparatory School, a private, coeducational PK–12 college preparatory school, is in nearby Lake Butler.

The town of Windermere is not within the attendance boundaries of Windermere High School, a Lake Butler high school which opened in 2017. The Windermere town council opposed the naming on the grounds that area residents may mistakenly confuse the school with Windermere Preparatory. Some OCPS board members also argued the school should not be named for a community it will not be located in; they stated that not very many students from the town of Windermere will go to Windermere High.

== Transportation ==
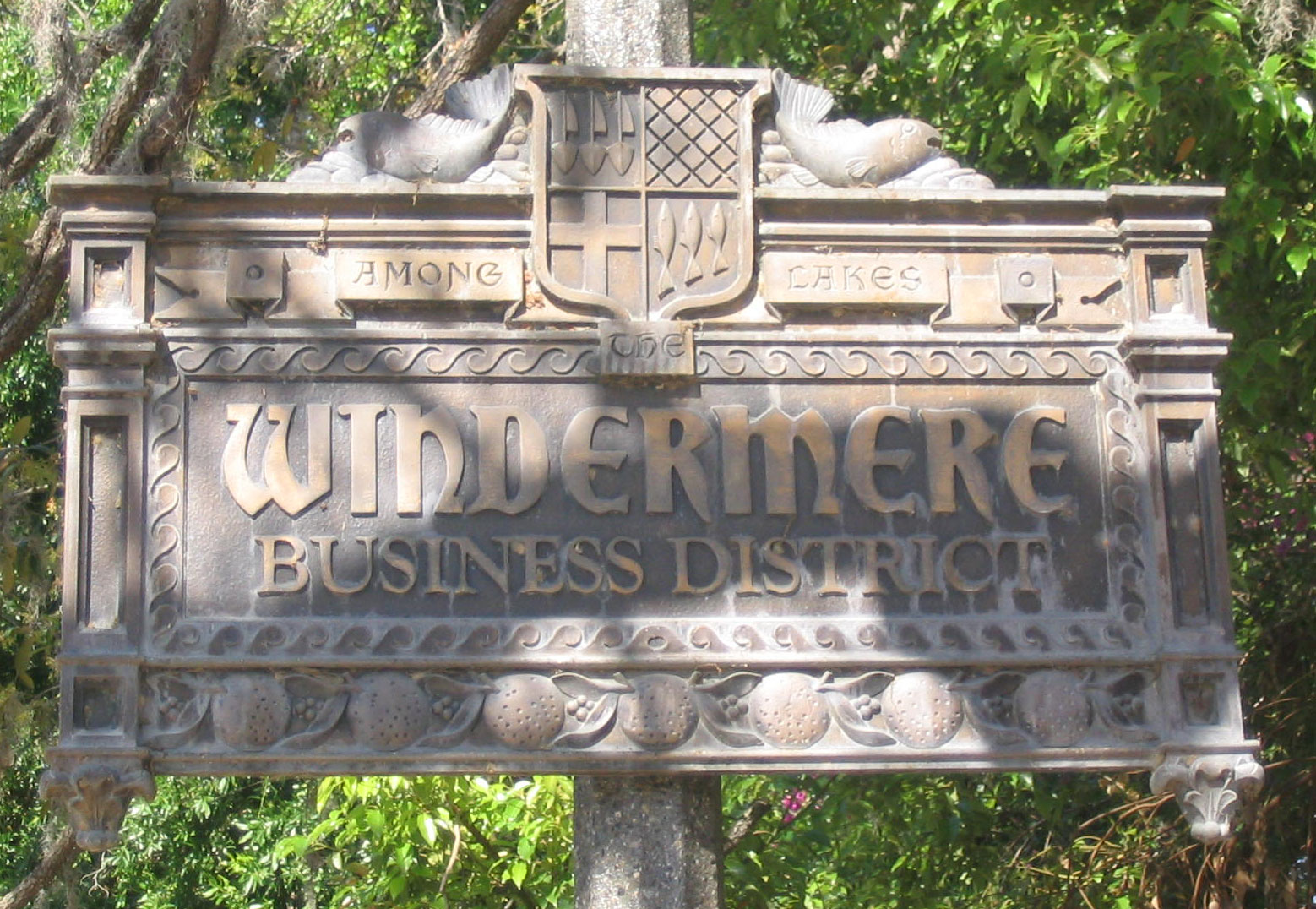
These signs appear on light poles at borders of the business district at the center of downtown.

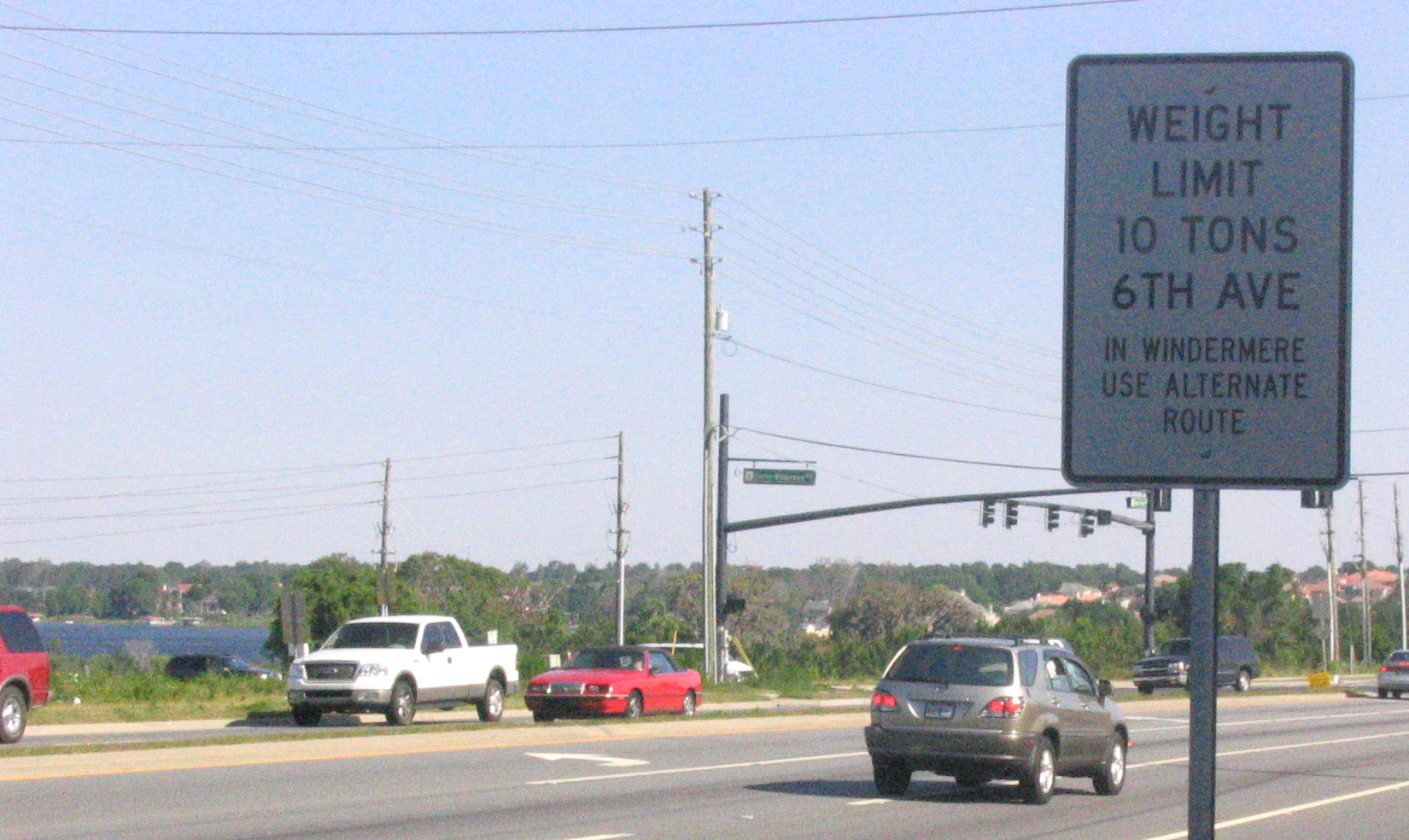
Signs on Apopka-Vineland Road, 1.5 mi (2.4 km) east of downtown, warn heavy vehicles to stay out of Windermere.

Windermere is located on an isthmus between several lakes in the Lake Butler chain. As such, it is on the shortest road route between the east and west sides of the chain. In fact, the next crossing to the south is 7.5 mi (12.1 km) distant at Lake Buena Vista, where County Road 535 (CR 535) and Apopka-Vineland Road meet. The next crossing to the north is at Gotha, the north end of the chain of lakes, 2.25 mi (3.62 km) away. 2003 Annual Average Daily Traffic (AADT), much of which is commuters passing through, is 17,197 vehicles per day for Sixth Avenue (the east entrance), 18,362 on Main Street north of Sixth Avenue, and 9,484 on Main Street south of Sixth Avenue.

In 2004, two roundabouts were installed downtown with the largest public works project in the town's history. This has greatly improved traffic flow and relieved cut through traffic. A third roundabout was completed in August 2010 at the intersection of Park Avenue and Maguire Road. This is at the Windermere Elementary School intersection. All roads in the downtown area (laid out in a grid) are dirt roads except for a few through roads:

- Main Street from the northern boundary (as Maguire Road, which heads north to Ocoee) south to 12th Street; the pavement turns west at 12th Street onto Chase Road, which connects to CR 535
- Sixth Avenue east from Main Street to the town line, where it becomes Conroy-Windermere Road
- Second Avenue west from Main Street (serves a peninsula)
- "Dirt Main Street", just west of Main Street (opposite where the railroad used to run), from Third Avenue to Seventh Avenue
- Several other paved roads exist in the outskirts, in areas that have been annexed since the original town was formed.

Until the 1980s, Main Street north of Sixth Avenue and Sixth Avenue east of Main Street were maintained by the Florida Department of Transportation (FDOT) as part of State Road 439. This was given to Orange County as County Road 439 (CR 439), and Orange County eventually removed all signs and gave the part inside Windermere to the town. Signs put up by FDOT still mark the north end of CR 439 at SR 50, but no other signs exist, in part because Orange County has a general policy of not signing county roads.

The Florida Midland Railroad, part of the Atlantic Coast Line Railroad, used to run just west of Main Street; there is now a large grassy area between Main Street and the dirt road (often called "Dirt Main Street") that ran just west of the railroad. Windermere had a station on the railroad.

== Controversy ==
In January 2014, the police department's former chief, Daniel Saylor, was sentenced to eight years in prison for perjury. He had lied to the court in order to protect a friend who was found guilty of raping children and sentenced to life in prison. Saylor had pleaded guilty to other charges in 2011, earning him a year in jail.

== Notable people ==
- Michael Ammar, magician
- Vince Carter, professional NBA basketball player
- Johnny Damon, former professional MLB baseball player
- Jay Garner, retired general
- Rick Goings, chairman and chief executive officer of Tupperware Brands Corporation
- Dee Gordon, professional MLB baseball player
- Ken Griffey Jr., Hall of Fame former professional MLB baseball player
- Adam Haseley, professional MLB baseball player
- Grant Hill, former professional NBA basketball player
- Skip Kendall, professional golfer
- Gugu Liberato, TV presenter
- Kyle Masson, racing driver
- Brad Miller, professional MLB baseball player
- Julianne Morris, actress
- Shaquille O'Neal, former professional NBA basketball player
- Ethan Ringel, racing driver
- David A. Siegel, founder of Westgate Resorts, owner of the Versailles house, and former owner of the Orlando Predators
- Jackie Siegel, model and actress, owner and director of Mrs. Florida America beauty pageant
- Trevor Siemian, professional NFL football player
- Philip Michael Thomas, actor and musician
- Mark Tremonti, musician for the rock bands Alter Bridge, Creed, and Tremonti
- Llandel Veguilla, reggaeton artist, also known as Yandel, from the Wisin y Yandel duo
- Bubba Watson, professional golfer
- Jason Williams, former professional NBA basketball player
- Jesse Winker, professional MLB baseball player
- Tiger Woods, professional golfer

== See also ==
- 1890 Windermere School
- Cal Palmer Memorial Building
- Windermere Town Hall
- Windermere's 9/11 Memorial
