= S. Howard Atha House =

- U.S. National Register of Historic Places
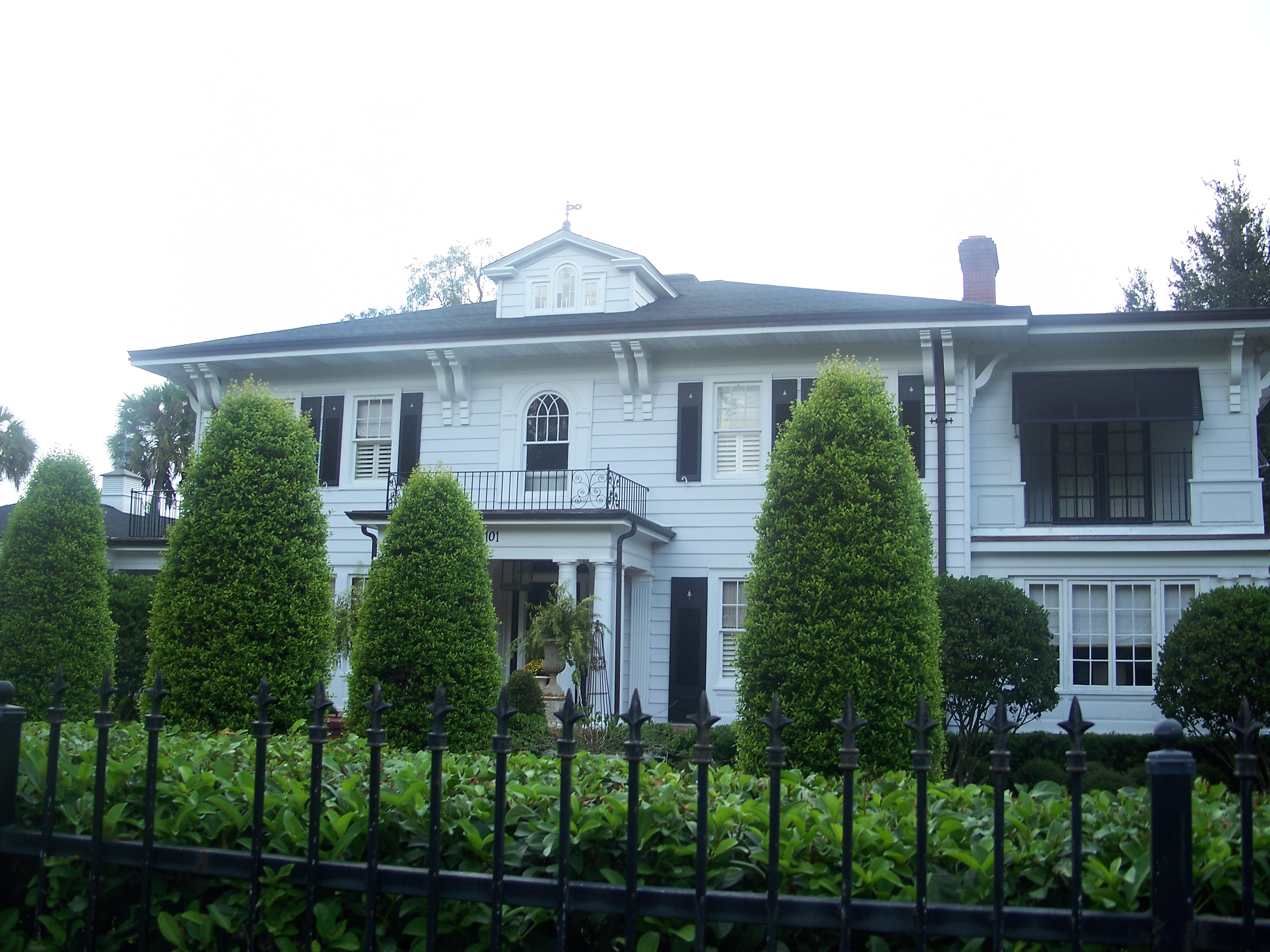

- Location within Florida Location within the United States
- Location: Orlando, Florida
- Coordinates: 28°34′17″N 81°23′41″W
- Built: 1928
- NRHP reference No.: 09000672
- Added to NRHP: September 2, 2009

S. Howard Atha House is a national historic site located at 1101 West Princeton Street, Orlando, Florida in Orange County.

It was added to the National Register of Historic Places in 2009.
