= Rogers Building (Florida) =

- U.S. National Register of Historic Places
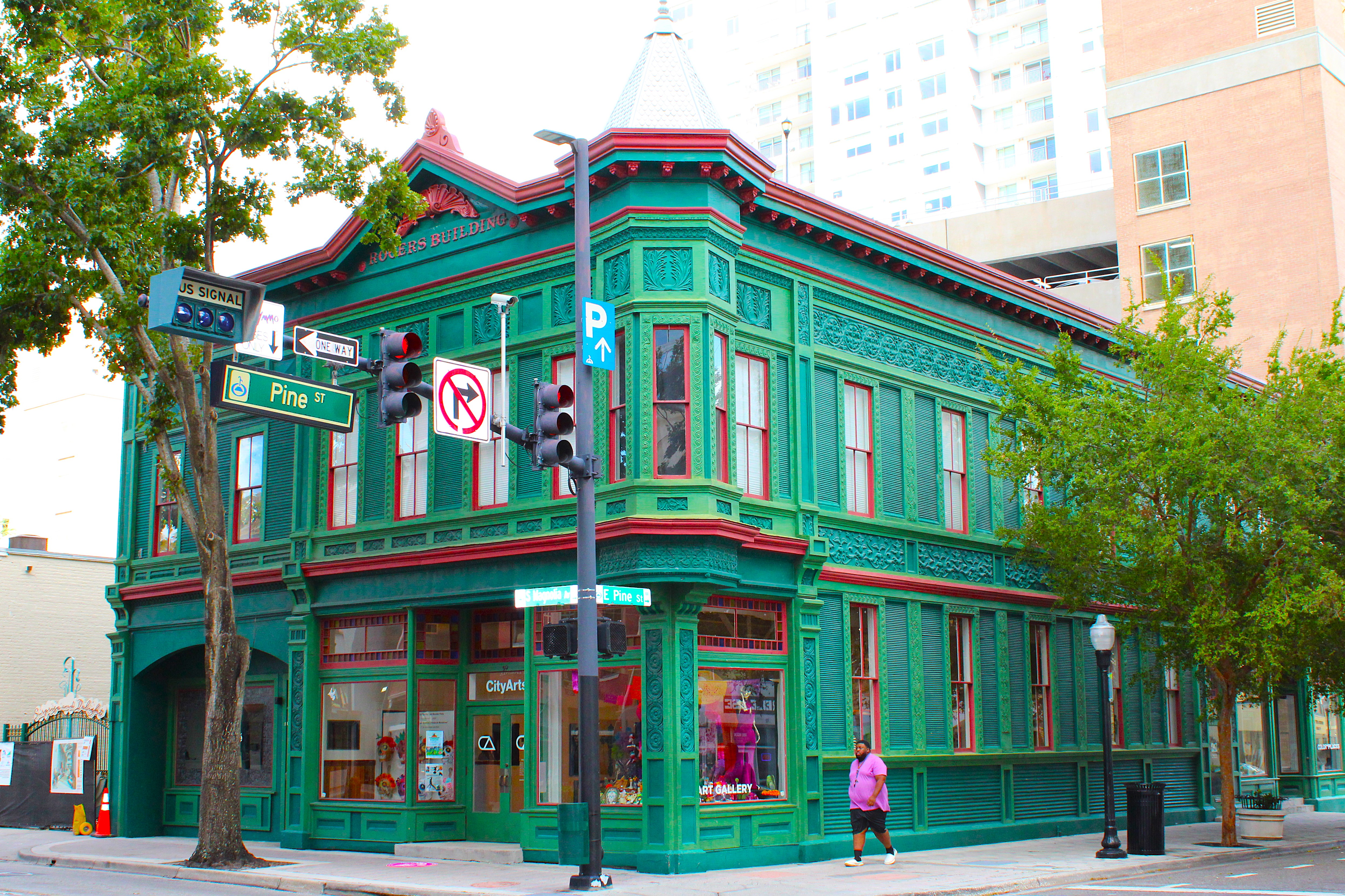

- Location within Florida Location within the United States
- Location: Orlando, Florida
- Coordinates: 28°32′34″N 81°22′14″W
- Built: 1886+
- Architect: William H. Mullins
- NRHP reference No.: 83001433
- Added to NRHP: July 7, 1983

The Rogers Building (also known as the English Club) is a historic site in Orlando, Florida. It is located at 37-39 South Magnolia Avenue. Originally an English Gentlemen's Club built in the Queen Anne style, is the oldest building in downtown Orlando and now is home the Downtown Art's District.

The Downtown Arts District provides funding support, manages and operates CityArts -- a multi-use arts and cultural destination where visual and performing arts co-exist inside the Roger's Building. Visited by more than 100,000 people annually, CityArts showcases an infusion of local and international works of art, and is home to six independently operated art galleries as well as art collective, Red Tape.

On July 7, 1983, it was added to the U.S. National Register of Historic Places.

== Gallery ==
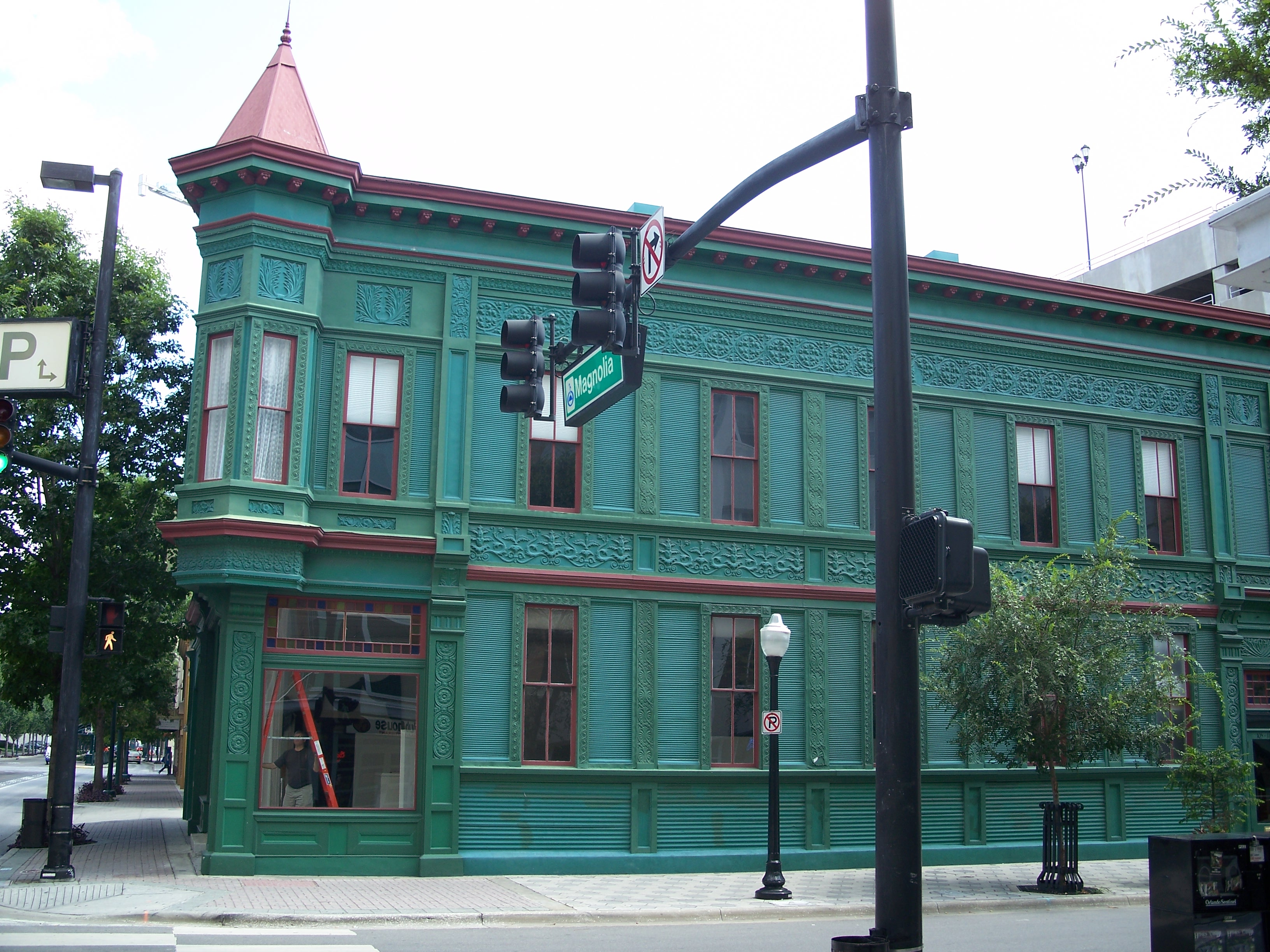

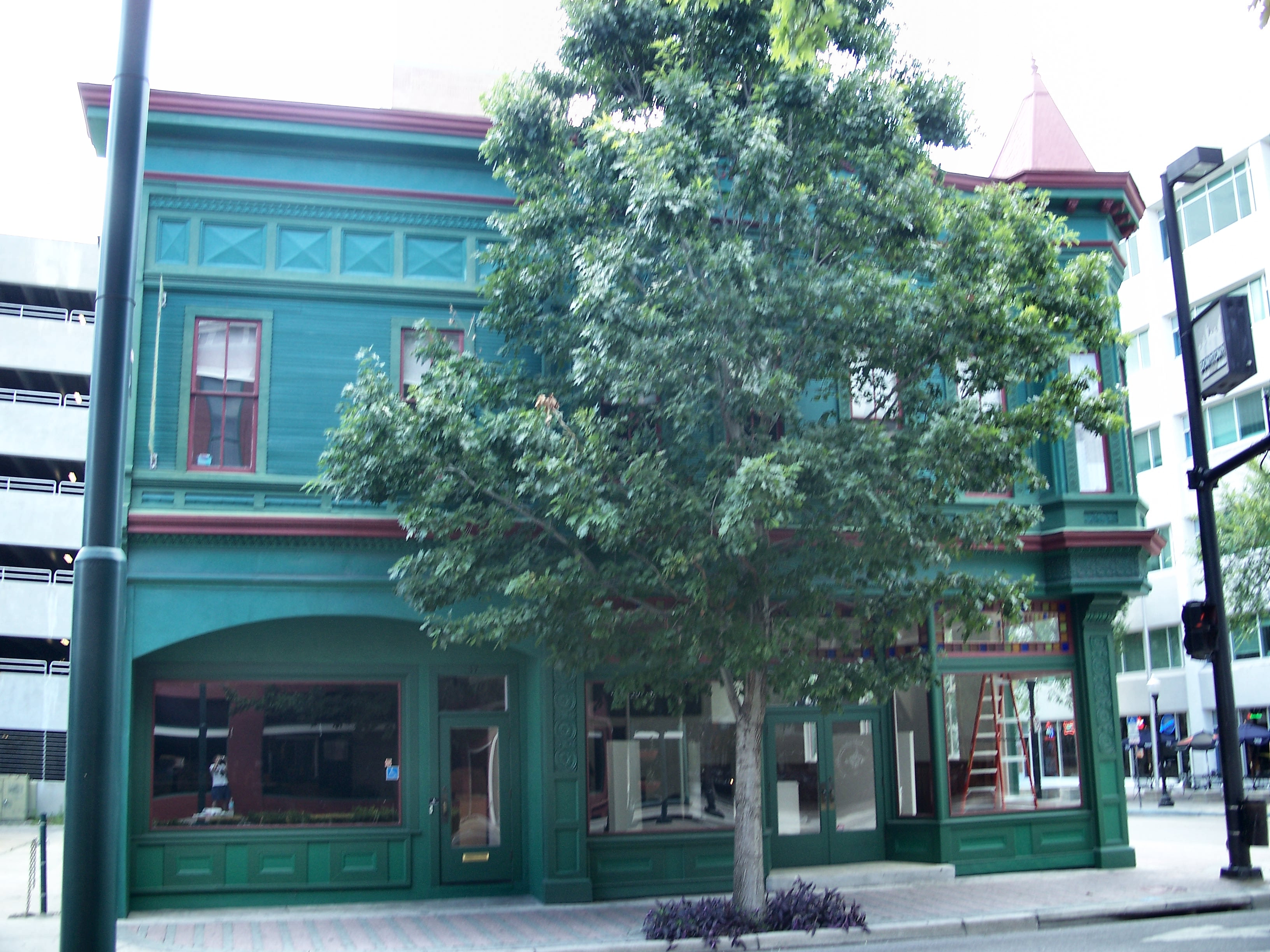

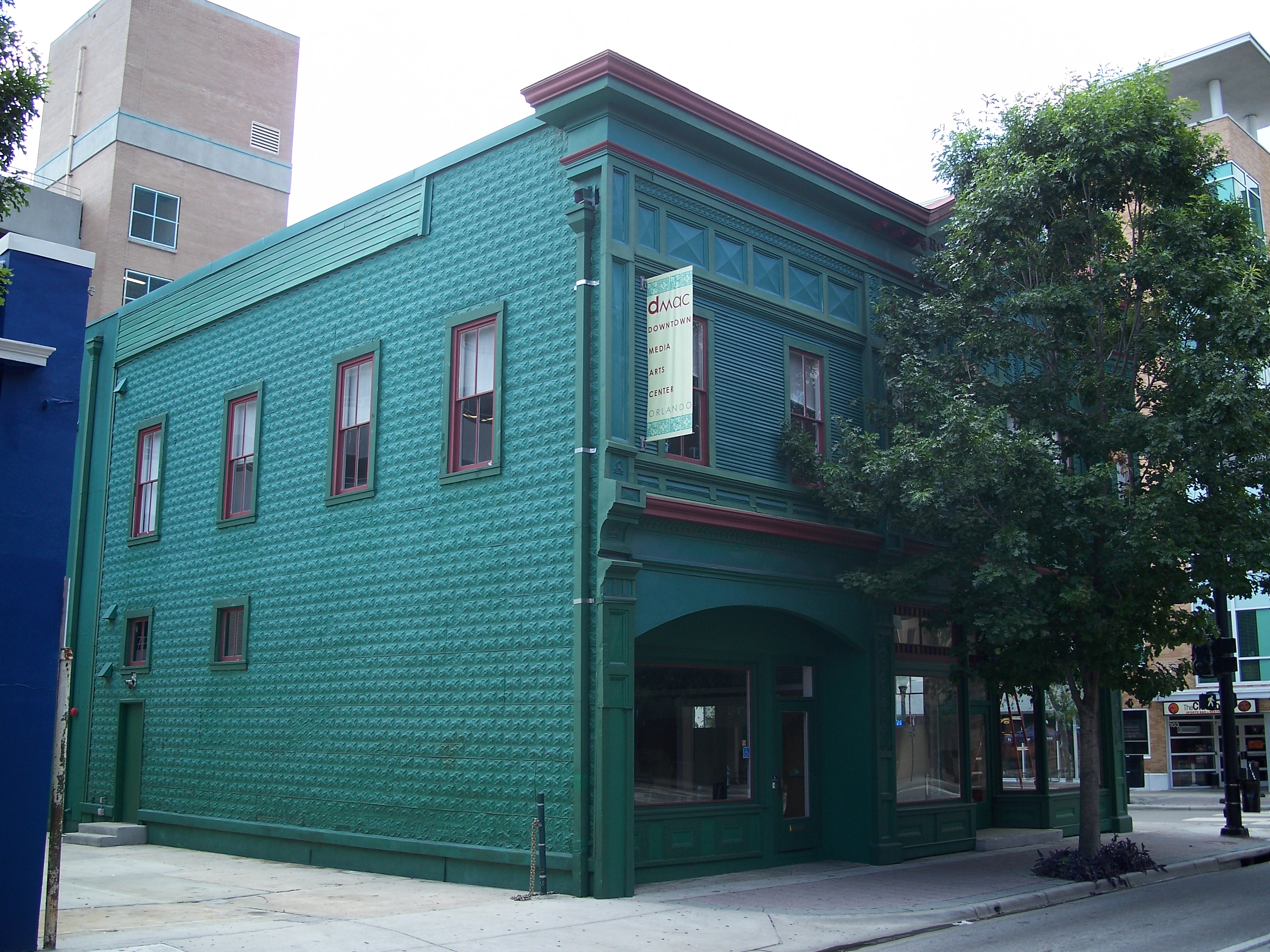
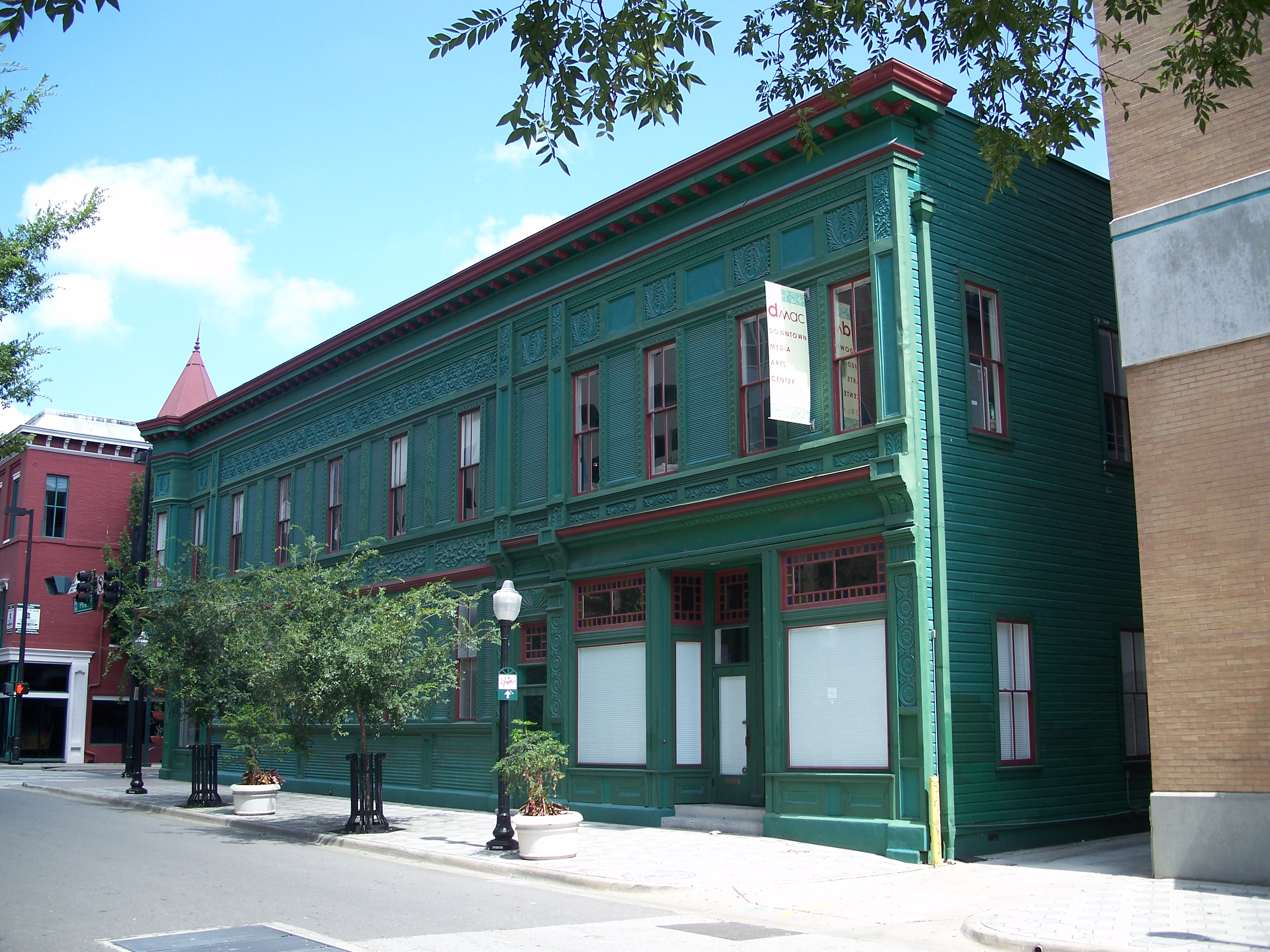
