= Twin Mounds Archeological District =

Historic district in Florida, United States

- U.S. National Register of Historic Places
- U.S. Historic district
- Location within Florida Location within the United States
- Location: Orange County, Florida
- Nearest city: Sorrento
- Coordinates: 28.82°N 81.42°W
- Area: 13 acres (0.053 km^{2})
- NRHP reference No.: 91001957
- Added to NRHP: January 19, 1992

The Twin Mounds Archeological District, also known as Wekiva 7 (8Or457) & Wekiva 8 (8Or459), is a U.S. historic district east of Sorrento, Florida.

It is located on the west bank of the Wekiva River, seven miles south of its confluence with the St. Johns River. On January 19, 1992, it was added to the U.S. National Register of Historic Places.
