= Albin Polasek House and Studio =

Museum in Florida, United States

- U.S. National Register of Historic Places
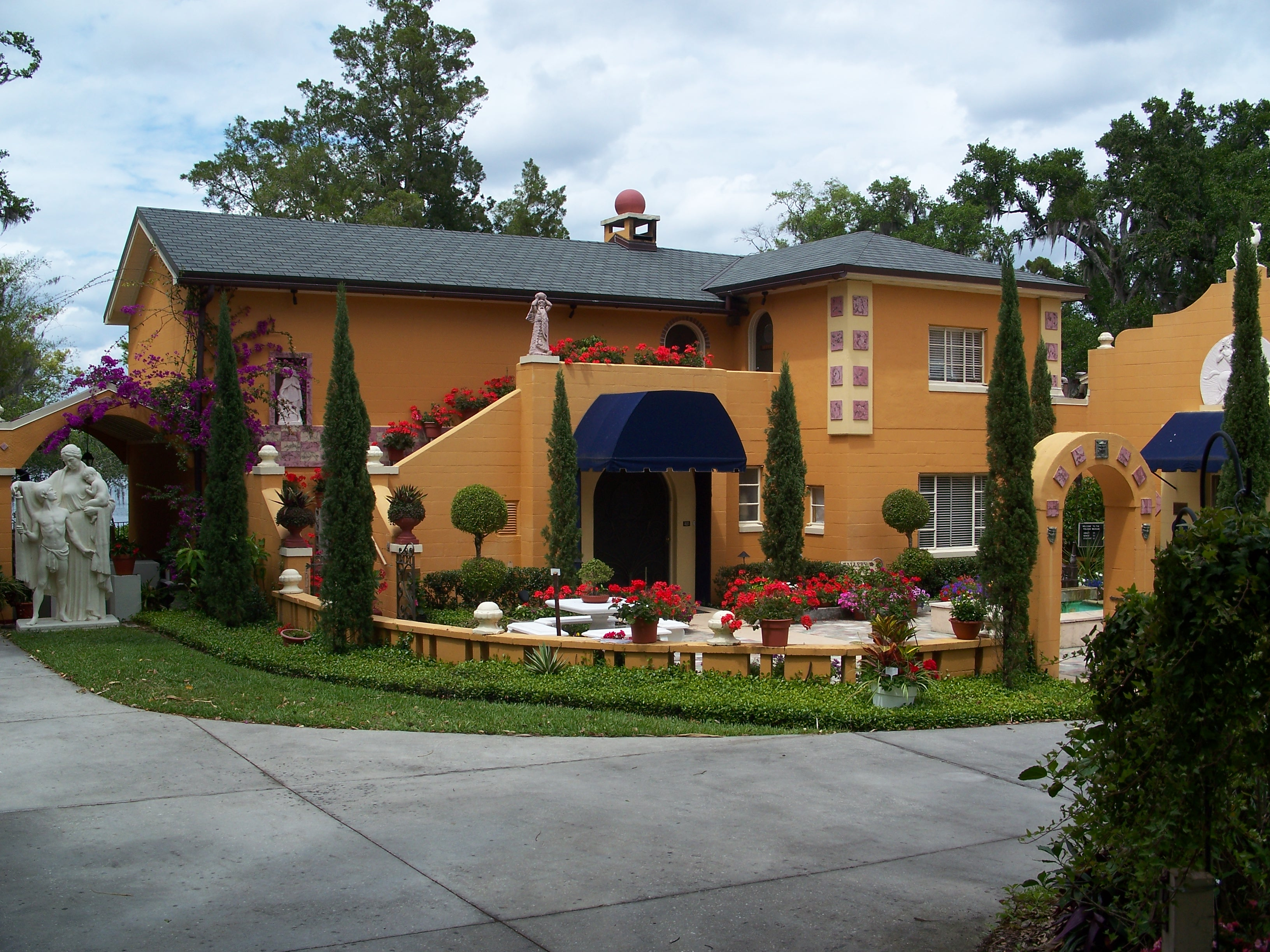

- Location within Florida Location within the United States
- Location: Winter Park, Florida
- Coordinates: 28°35′47″N 81°20′39″W
- Built: 1949
- NRHP reference No.: 99000767
- Added to NRHP: May 2, 2000

The Albin Polasek House and Studio, also known as the Albin Polasek Museum & Sculpture Gardens, or The Polasek, is a historic site located at 633 Osceola Avenue in Winter Park, Florida, United States. It is a former house-turned-museum on three acres, overlooking Lake Osceola. It is dedicated to preserving the works of sculptor Albin Polasek, as well as celebrating representational art and exhibiting regional and international artists. On May 2, 2000, it was added to the National Register of Historic Places, under the name "Albin Polasek House and Studio".

== History ==
Founded in 1961, the Albin Polasek Museum & Sculpture Gardens is home to an art collection focusing primarily on American representational sculpture created by Czech-American sculptor Albin Polasek (1879–1965). Polasek was born in Frenštát, Moravia, part of Austria-Hungary (now in the Czech Republic) and immigrated to the United States in 1901 to work as a wood carver. He attended the Pennsylvania Academy of the Fine Arts in Philadelphia, and the American Academy in Rome. For 27 years he was head of the department of sculpture at the Art Institute of Chicago. He moved to Winter Park in 1950.

The Albin Polasek Museum & Sculpture Gardens is a nonprofit organization whose budget is funded by donations and memberships. All donations and dues go to support the Albin Polasek Foundation, which oversees the preservation, maintenance, and operation of the Albin Polasek Museum & Sculpture Gardens.

== Collections ==
The museum is housed in Polasek's Mediterranean-style home and studio where many of the original furnishings are on display. In 1961, Polasek opened his home and studio to the public.

The museum is a member of The Historic Artists' Homes and Studios (HAHS), an affiliate program of the National Trust for Historic Preservation that oversees the living and work spaces of painters, sculptors, ceramicists, photographers, and furniture designers.

The permanent collection of approximately 200 pieces includes sculpture by Polasek and his first wife Ruth Sherwood as well as antiquities from Polasek's collection. The galleries feature changing exhibitions of local artists for viewing and for sale. Special areas to visit in the garden include the butterfly garden, two water gardens, the cycad collection along the museum's front drive and the many individual container gardens found throughout the property.

== The Capen-Showalter House ==
Originally scheduled to be demolished back in 2013, the Albin Polasek Museum & Sculpture Gardens, Winter Park History Museum, the Friends of Casa Feliz, and community supporters rescued the historic home by raising $450,000 to relocate it to the Polasek Museum. The home was cut into two halves and floated across Lake Osceola. The project won the 2014 Organizational Achievement Award from Florida Trust for Historic Preservation.

The 4,200-square-foot house overlooks the lake and now contains museum offices, exhibits, and artwork. Workshops, meetings, and special events are held at the home.

== Events and programs ==
The Albin Polasek Museum & Sculpture Gardens hosts the annual Winter Park Paint Out. Twenty-five artists have seven days to publicly create works throughout the streets of Winter Park. Once completed the paintings are hung in the gallery's "Wet Room" and offered for sale to benefit the museum. During this week long event in April, the museum is free to the public.

Daily tours of the permanent collection and the Capen-Showalter House are available as part of regular admission.

== See also ==
- Forest Idyl
- List of sculpture parks
