= Kraft Azalea Park =

Public park in Florida, US

Coordinates: 28.611232°N 81.344715°W

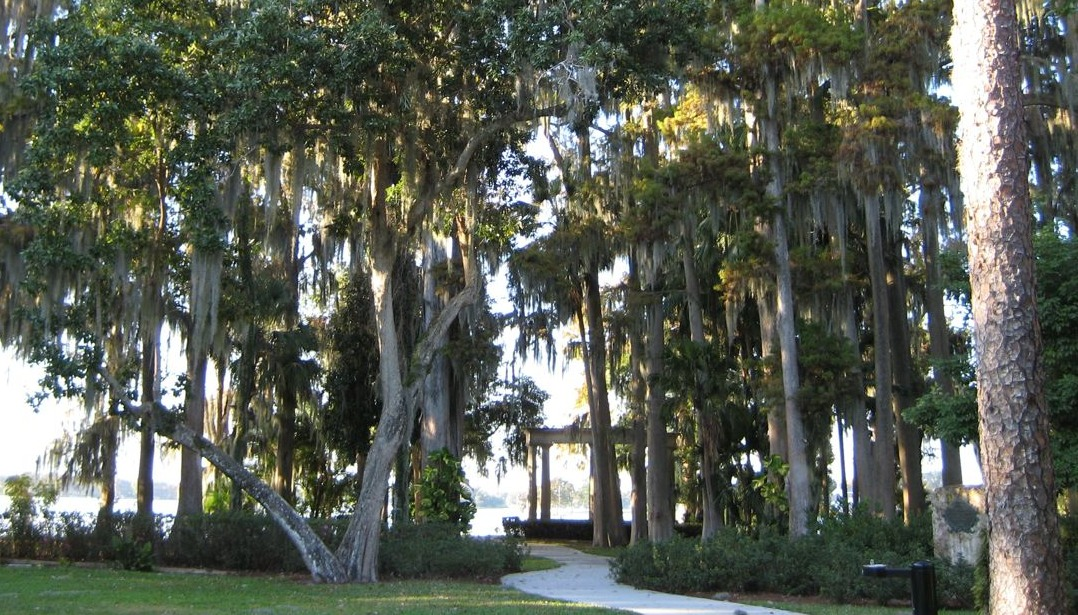
Entrance to the park

Kraft Azalea Park (alternatively, Kraft Azalea Garden) is a scenic public park located in the city of Winter Park, Florida just north of Orlando, Florida. The park is bordered by Lake Maitland on the North and West.

== History ==
The park was developed 1938. Notable nurseryman Martin Daetwyler was hired to design the garden by well-known residents, George and Maud Kraft, Mayor Frederick Cady, Forney Shepard, Leonard Hackney and Mrs. C. F. Ward.

== Amenities ==
The quiet 5.22-acre park has eight benches for reading, picnic, or just spending a quiet relaxing time. There are trails for short walks and the park also has a small dock that is open for fishing nearby Lake Maitland (formerly known as Lake Fumecheliga). Common fish to catch include largemouth bass, carp, bluegill, gar, and tilapia. The park also contains the Exedra monument which is a stone arc monument near the water's edge. The park, including the monument, has been used in the past and is able to be reserved for photos shoots and weddings.

=== Outside of the park ===
There are local boat tours that routinely pass by the park. The Scenic Boat Tours, a well-established boat tour from downtown Winter Park, offers an 18-passenger trip passed the park, during which you can view the Exedra monument from the boat.

== Location ==
The park is located in a residential area with very limited parking. Entrance to the park is located on 1363 Alabama Drive in Winter Park, Florida.

Bordering Lake Maitland, the park is illuminated by plants, flowers, and beautiful cypress trees. Lake Maitland is the largest lake in the Winter Park Chain of Lakes. The Winter Park Chain of Lakes consists of six lakes: Lake Virginia, Lake Mizell, Lake Osceola, Lake Maitland, Lake Nina and Lake Minnehaha. Kraft Azalea Park is located near one of the many canals connecting this chain. In addition, the Rollins College is accessible from this chain of lakes and most visible from Lake Virginia. From the small dock, Dog Island, a popular spot for families can be seen.
