= St. Margaret Mary Catholic Church =

Many Catholic churches are named after Margaret Mary Alacoque. These include:

- St. Margaret Mary Church (Winter Park)
- St. Margaret Mary's Church (Bronx)
- St. Margaret Mary Church (Omaha)
