= Woman's Club of Winter Park =

- The Woman's Club of Winter Park
- U.S. National Register of Historic Places
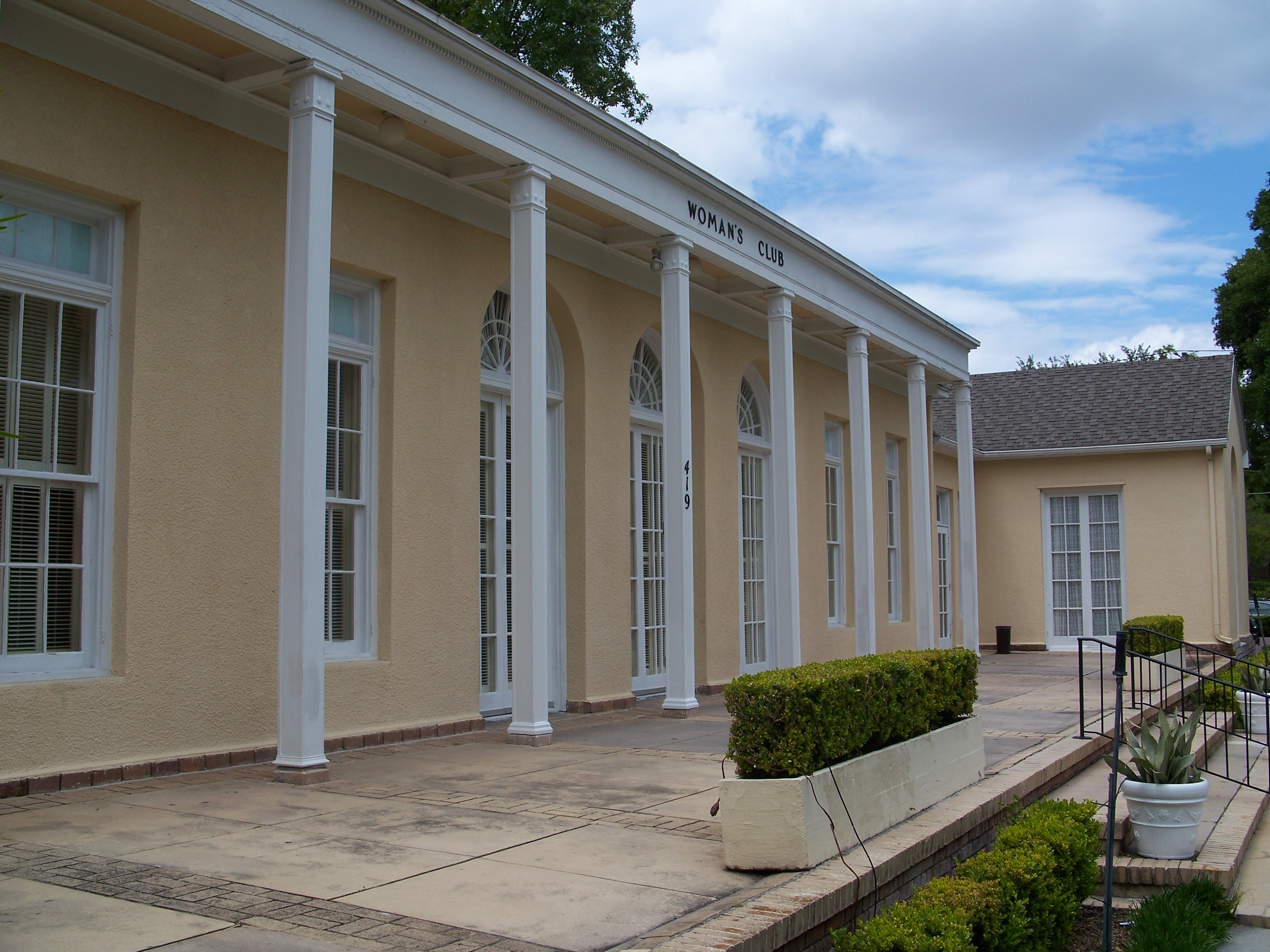

- Location within Florida Location within the United States
- Location: Winter Park, Florida
- Coordinates: 28°35′39″N 81°20′57″W
- Built: 1921
- NRHP reference No.: 95000537
- Added to NRHP: May 4, 1995

The Woman's Club of Winter Park is a historic woman's club in Winter Park, Florida. It is located at 419 Interlachen Avenue. On May 4, 1995, it was added to the U.S. National Register of Historic Places.

== Origins ==
The original planners of the club were Lucy Blackman, Alice Knox, and Lucy Meriwether in 1914. However, these women were not the official founders of the club. That honor goes to Mrs. Helen Morse who officially held the Women's Club first meeting in ‘Osceola Lodge’ on January 15, 1915. Mrs. Morse was the first president of the club with Mrs. Blackman as her vice President and Mrs. Hiram Power as secretary/treasurer.

== See also ==
List of Registered Historic Woman's Clubhouses in Florida
