= Winter Park Historical Museum =

Local museum in Winter Park, Florida

Winter Park History Museum
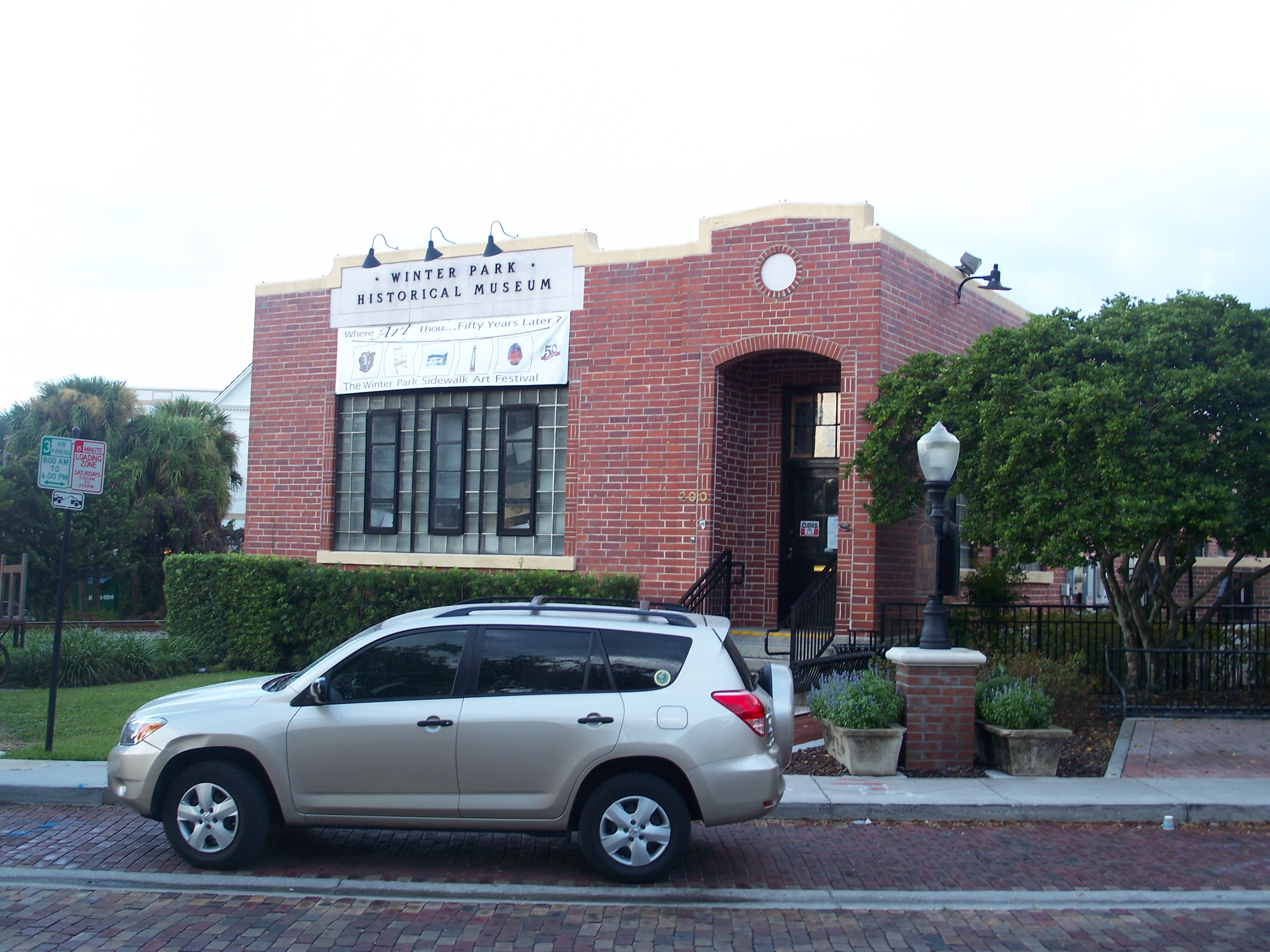
- Established: 1995
- Location: 200 West New England Avenue; Winter Park, Florida
- Coordinates: 28.59574°N 81.35218°W
- Type: Local history
- Collection size: 5,000
- Website: www.wphistory.org

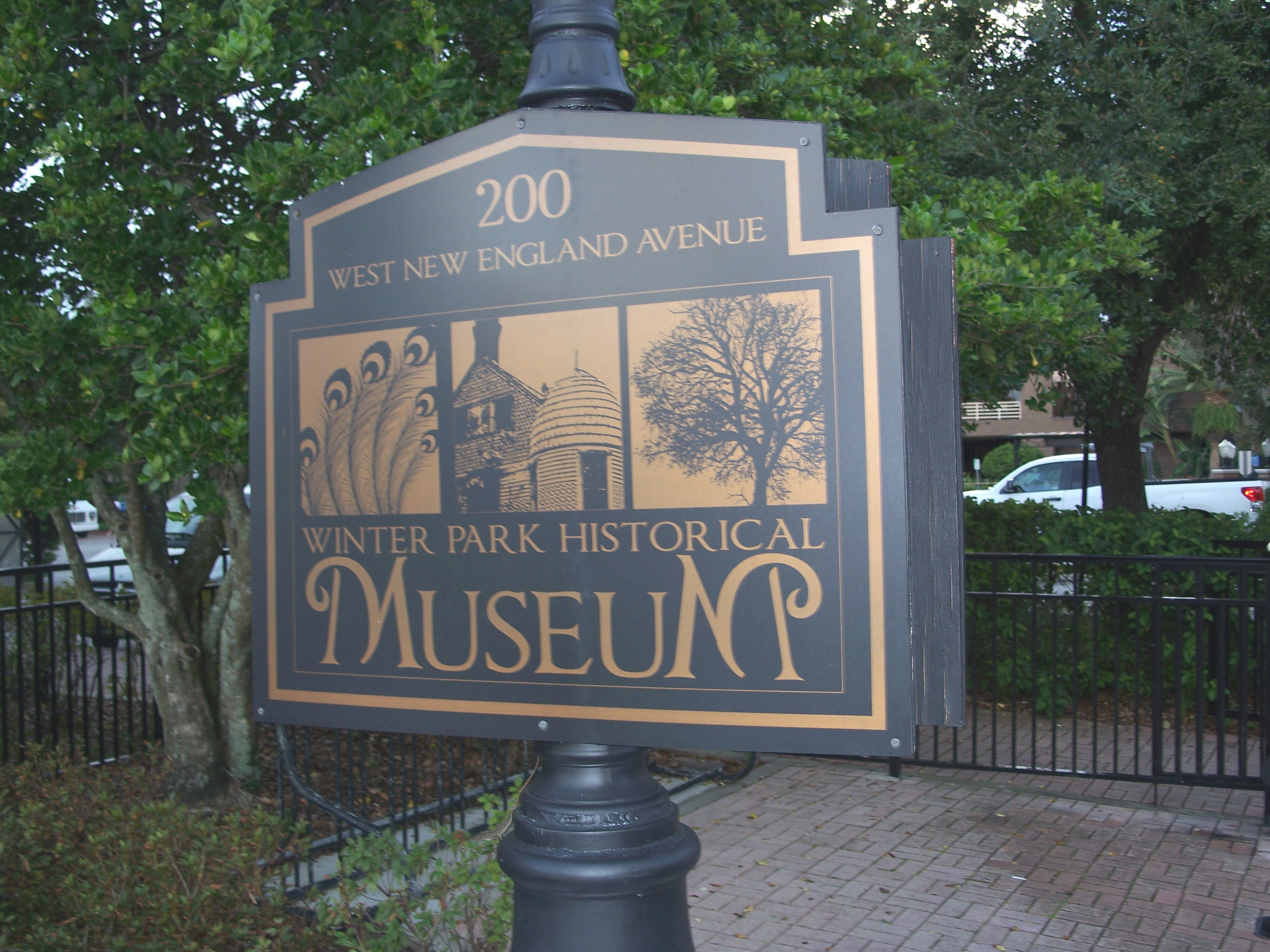

Winter Park History Museum, also known as the Winter Park Historical Museum, is a local history museum in Winter Park, Orange County, Florida. It is operated by the Winter Park Historical Association and located in a former railroad freight depot.

The museum's collections of historic artifacts include area schools, medical and military items, vintage postcards and photographs, Boy Scout items, and items of local businesses and industries.

Exhibitions have included local area history subjects such as area railroads, the history and culture of the turpentine industry, Winter Park High School history, and the city's Colony Theatre (Winter Park, Florida).

== See also ==
- List of museums in Florida
