= Winter Park, Florida =

City in Florida, US

- City
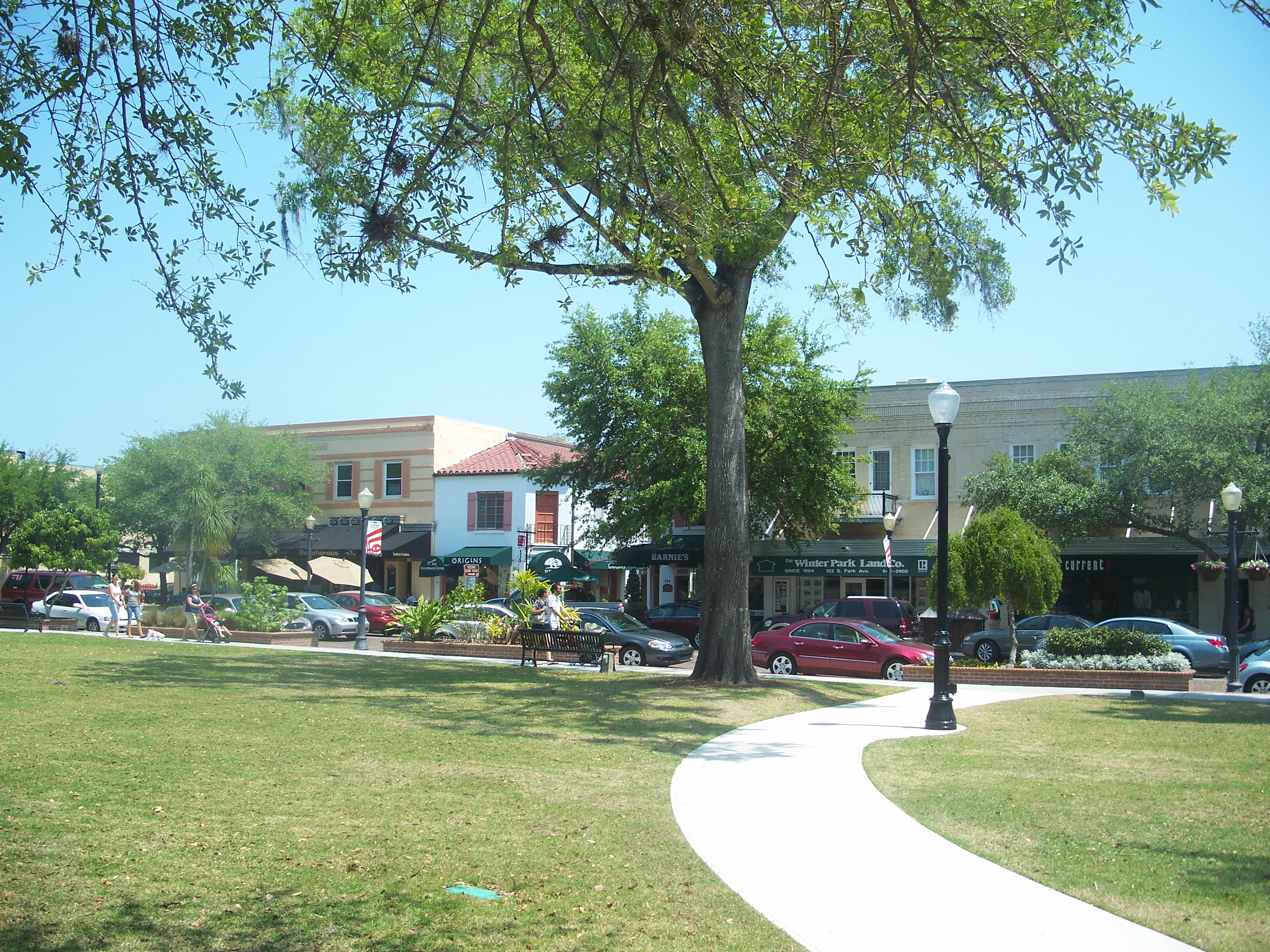
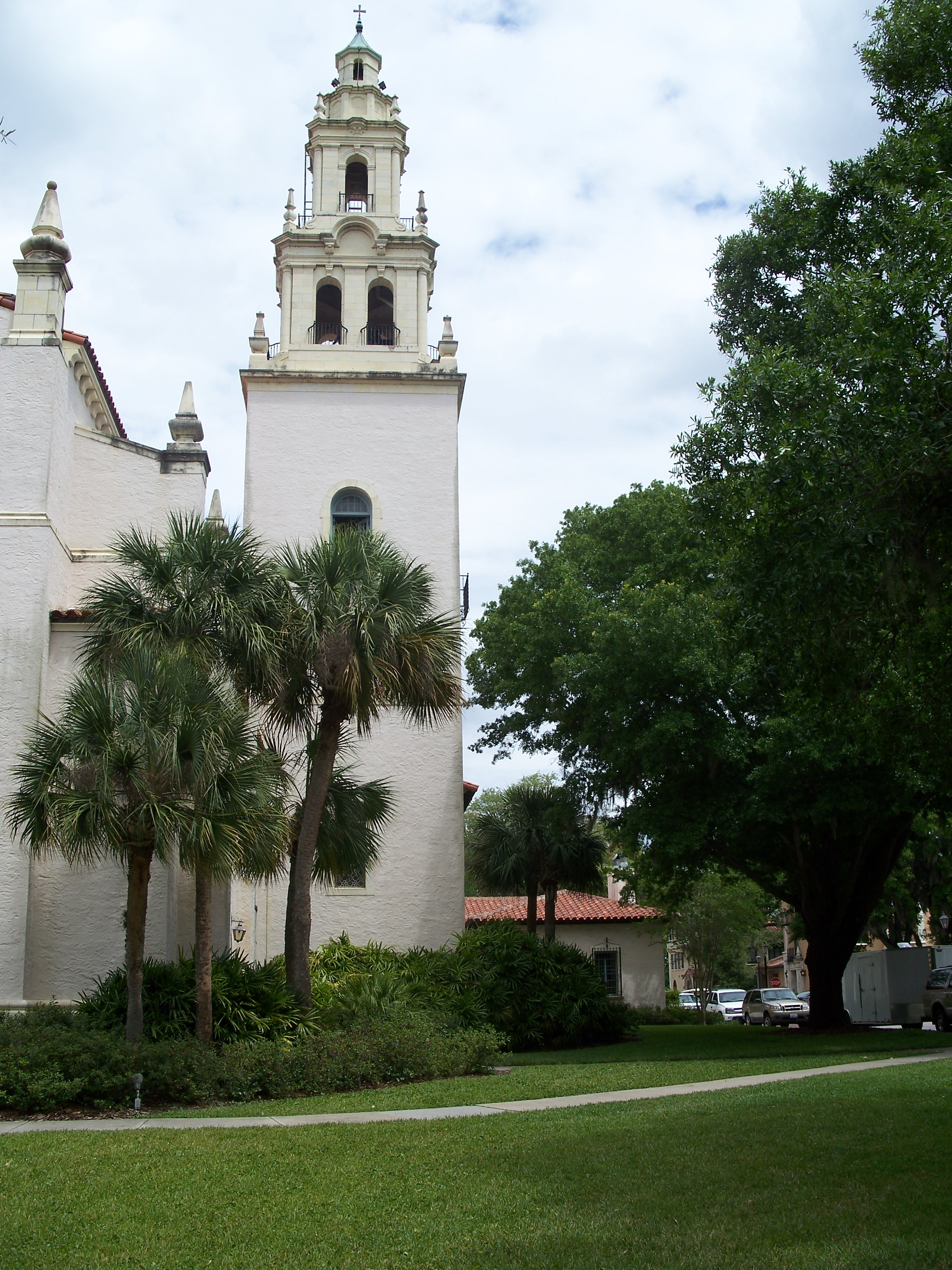
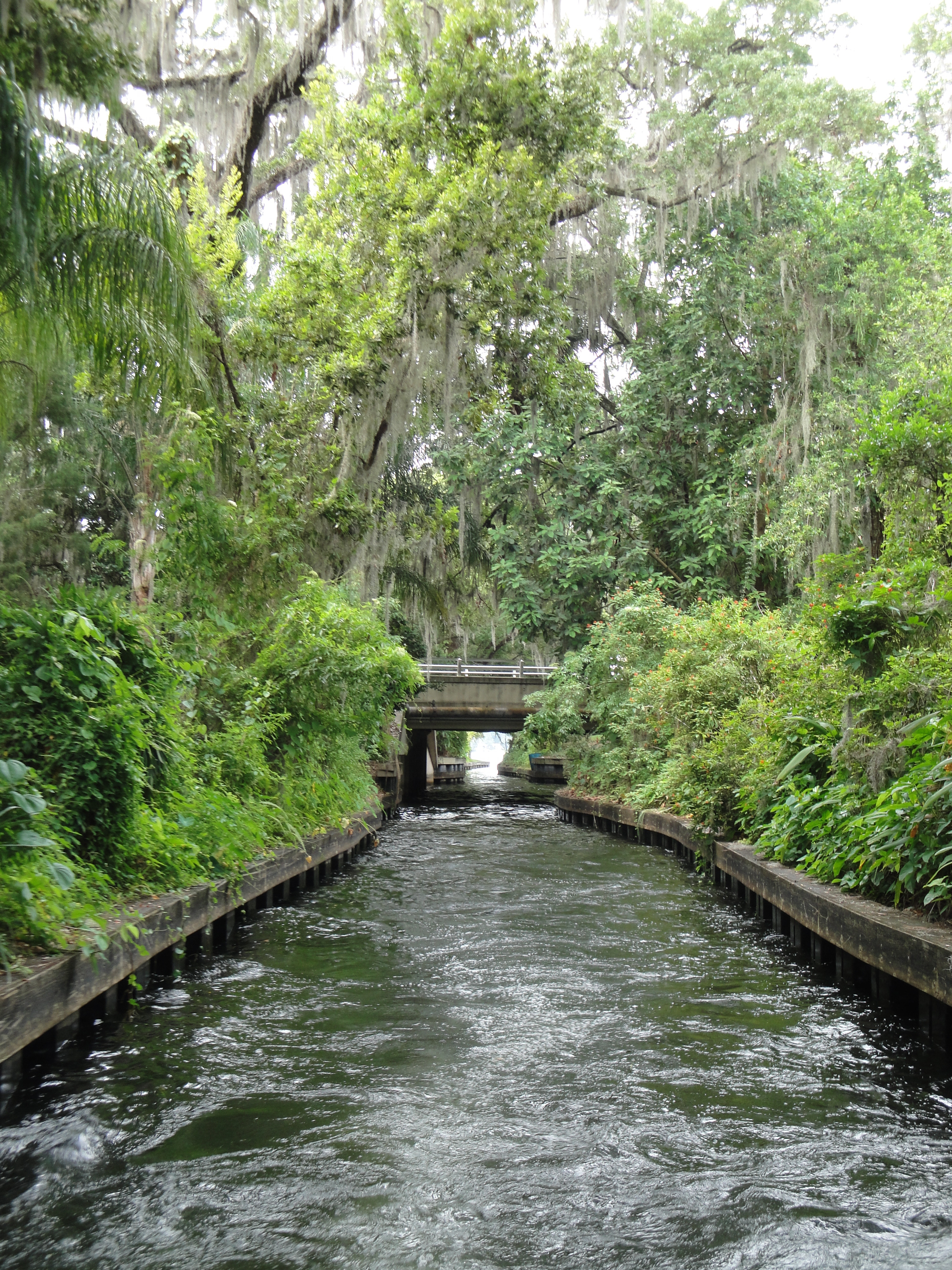
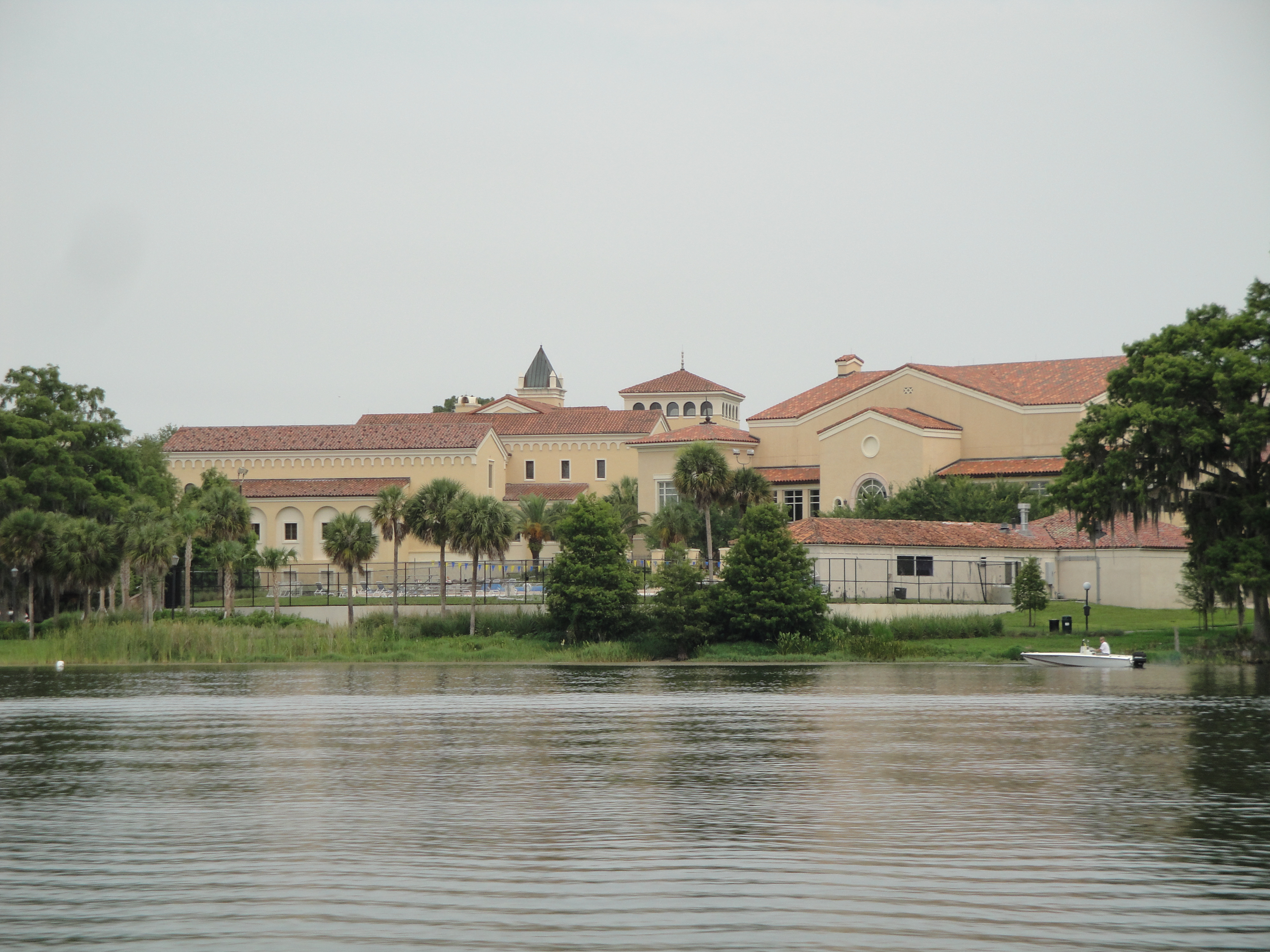
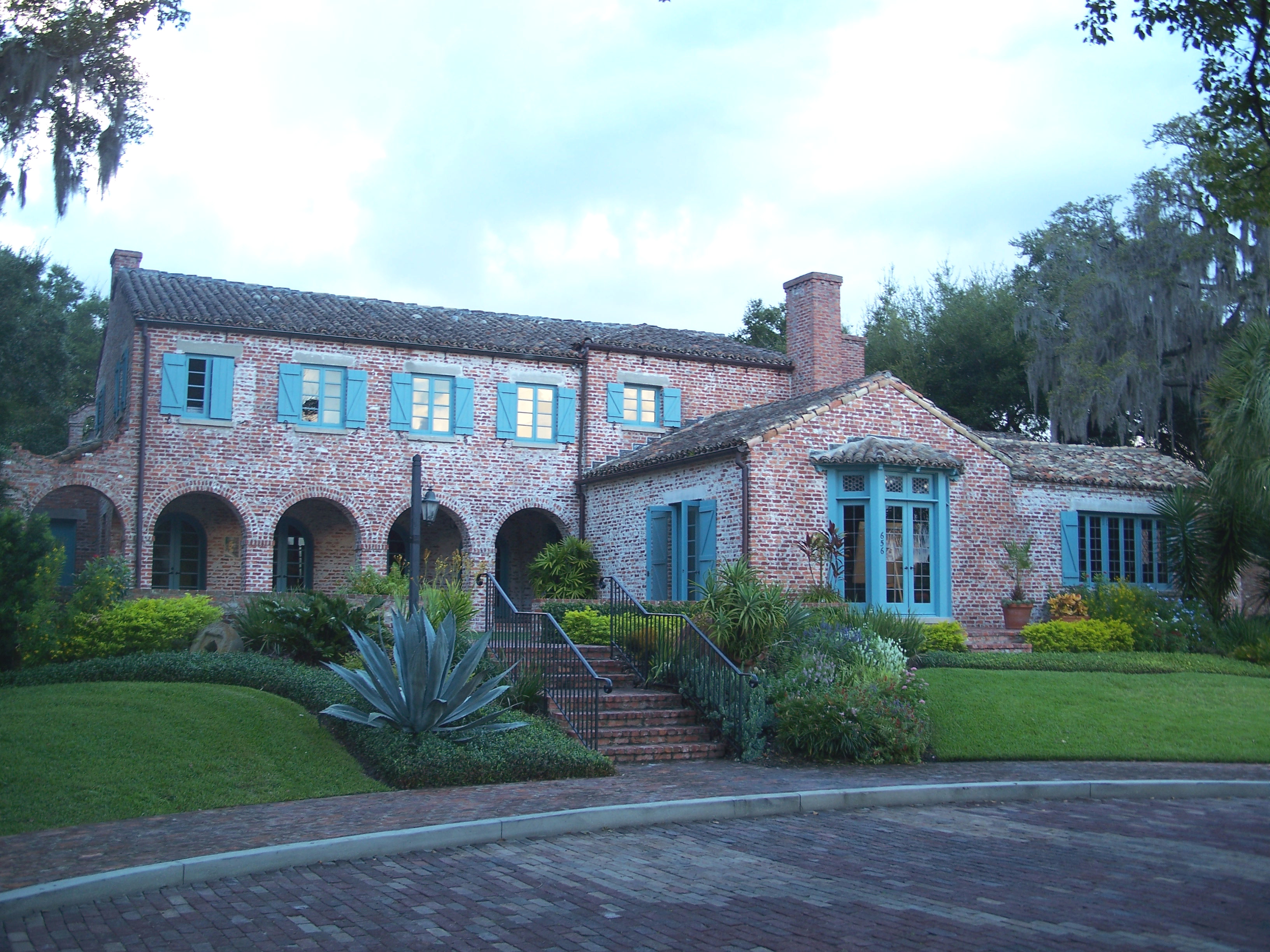
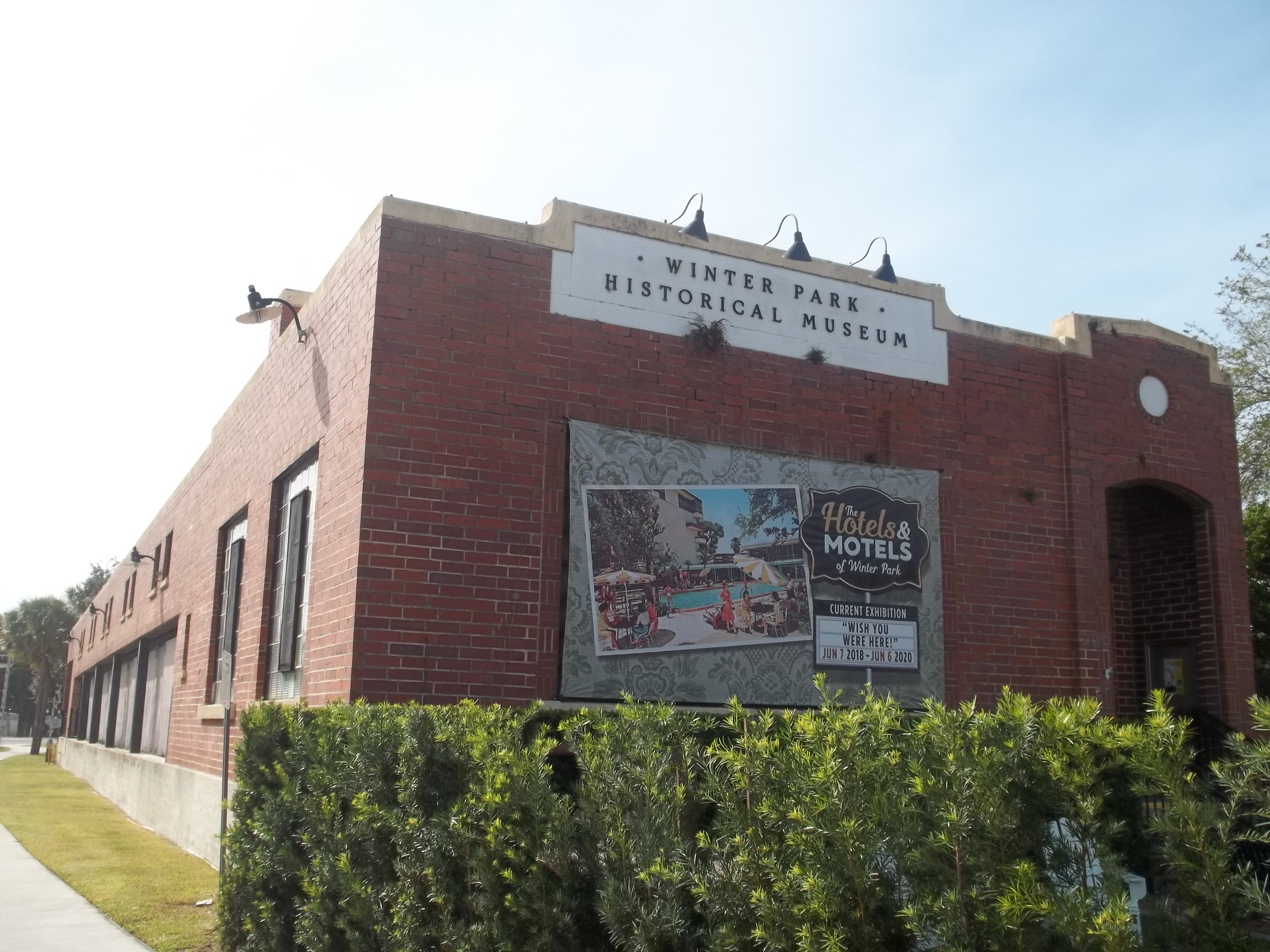
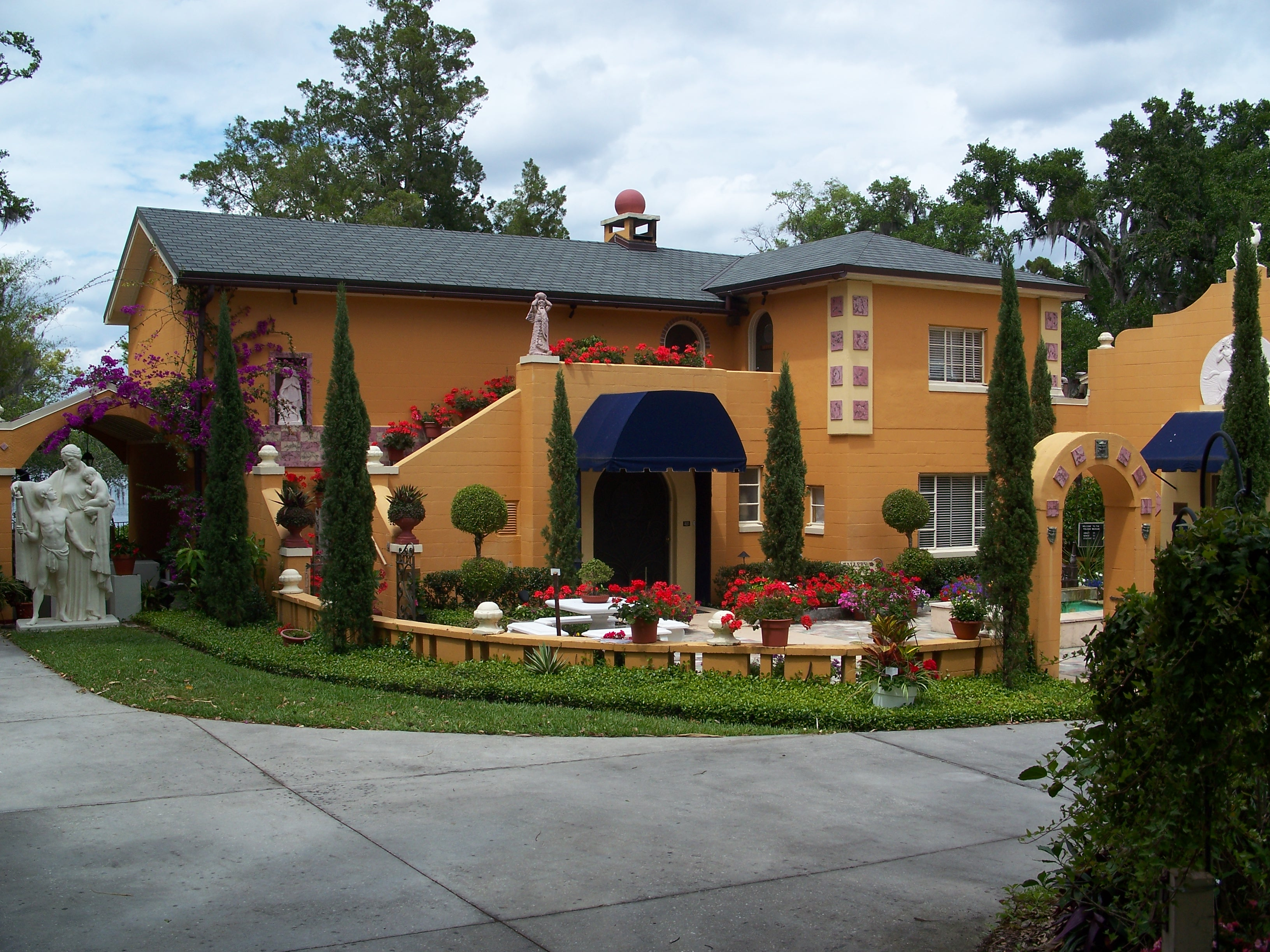
- Downtown Winter Park Knowles Memorial Chapel Venetian canal connecting Lake Virginia with Lake Osceola Rollins College Casa Feliz Winter Park Historical Museum Albin Polasek House and Studio

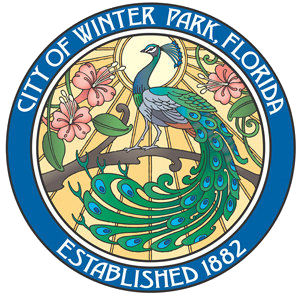
- Flag Seal
- Motto: "City of Culture and Heritage"
- Interactive map of Winter Park, Florida
- Location within Florida Location within the United States
- Coordinates: 28°35′46″N 81°20′48″W
- Country: United States
- State: Florida
- County: Orange
- Settled (Lakeview): 1858 (as Lakeview); 1870 (as Osceola)
- Incorporated (Town of Winter Park): October 21, 1887 (town); 1925 (city)

Government
  - Type: Commission–manager

Area
  - Total: 10.38 sq mi (26.89 km^{2})
  - Land: 8.76 sq mi (22.70 km^{2})
  - Water: 1.62 sq mi (4.19 km^{2})
- Elevation: 66 ft (20 m)

Population (2020)
  - Total: 29,795
  - Density: 3,399.9/sq mi (1,312.71/km^{2})
- Time zone: UTC-5 (Eastern (EST))
  - Summer (DST): UTC-4 (EDT)
- ZIP code(s): 32789, 32790 (PO box), 32792, 32793 (PO box)
- Area codes: 407, 689
- FIPS code: 12-78300
- GNIS feature ID: 2405774
- Website: cityofwinterpark.org

Winter Park is a city in Orange County, Florida, United States. The population was 29,795 at the 2020 census. It is part of the Orlando metropolitan area.

Winter Park was founded as a resort community by northern business magnates in the late 19th and early 20th centuries. It is home to Rollins College, a private liberal arts college.

== History ==
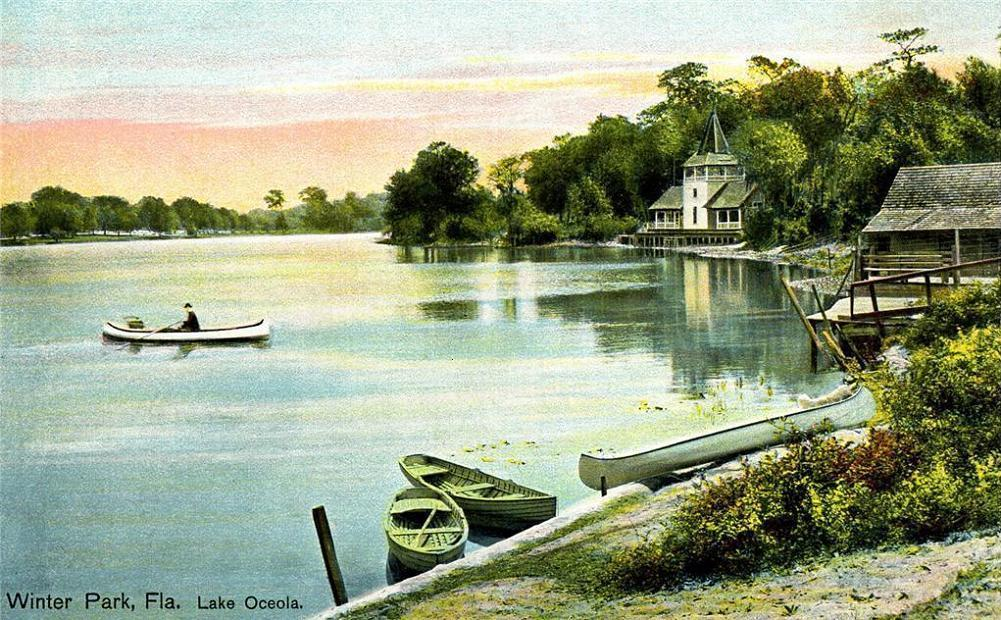
Lake Osceola c. 1906

The Winter Park area's first human residents were migrant Muscogee people who had earlier intermingled with the Choctaw and other indigenous people. In a process of ethnogenesis, the Native Americans formed a new culture which they called "Seminole", a derivative of the Mvskoke' (a Creek language) word simano-li, an adaptation of the Spanish cimarrón which means "wild" (in their case, "wild men"), or "runaway" [men].

The immediate area of the city was first inhabited by people of European descent in 1858, when David Mizell Jr. bought an 8-acre (32,000 m2) homestead between Lakes Virginia, Mizell, and Berry. A settlement, called "Lake View" by the inhabitants, grew up around Mizell's plot. It got a post office and a new name—"Osceola"—in 1870.

The area did not develop rapidly until 1880, when a South Florida Railroad track connecting Orlando and Sanford was laid a few miles west of Osceola. Shortly afterwards, Loring Chase came to Orange County from Chicago to recuperate from a lung disease. In his travels, he discovered the pretty group of lakes just east of the railbed. He enlisted the help of a wealthy New Englander, Oliver E. Chapman, and they assembled a very large tract of land for $13,000 on July 4, 1881. They planned the town of Winter Park on this land tract. Over the next four years they layer out the town plot, opened streets, built a town hall and a store, planted orange trees, and produced a development plan, which required all buildings to meet stylistic and architectural standards. Winter Park was a planned city, something that is still evident in its streets’ grid-like organization. The town was then promoted heavily, especially to “snow birds” in the North looking for a warm place, in which to winter. During this initial development period, the Winter Park Post Office opened, and the railroad constructed a depot, which connected to Osceola by a dirt road.

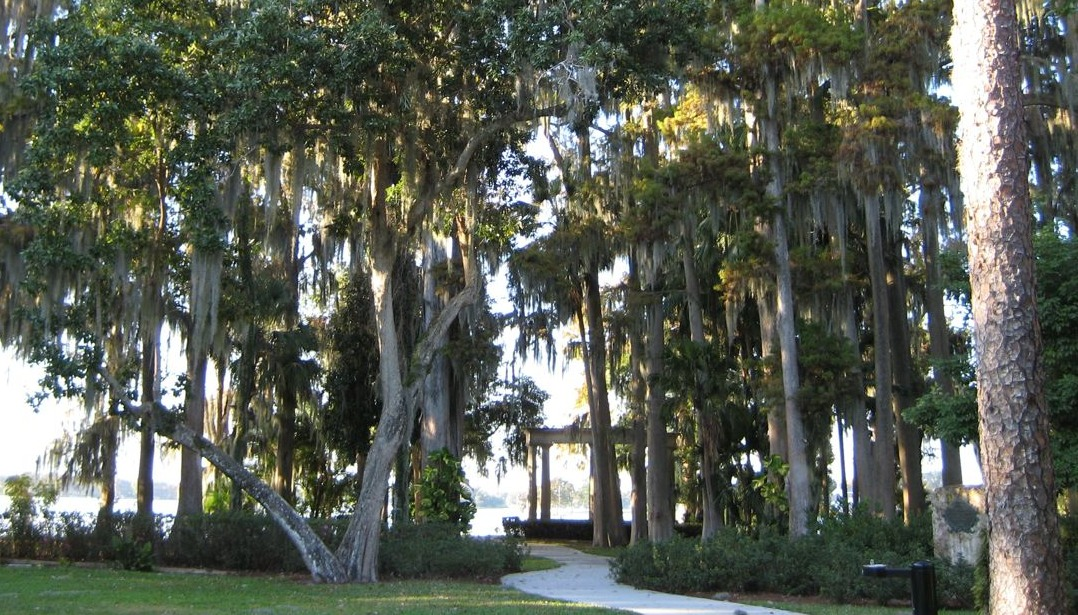
Kraft Azalea Park, located alongside of Lake Maitland

In 1885, a group of businessmen started the Winter Park Company and incorporated it with the Florida Legislature; Chase and Chapman sold the town to the new company. In a land bubble characteristic of Florida history, land prices soared from less than $2 per acre to over $200, with at least one sale recorded at $300 per acre. This land bubble concept would never go away, with towns and counties directly surrounding the area with exponentially cheaper land prices.

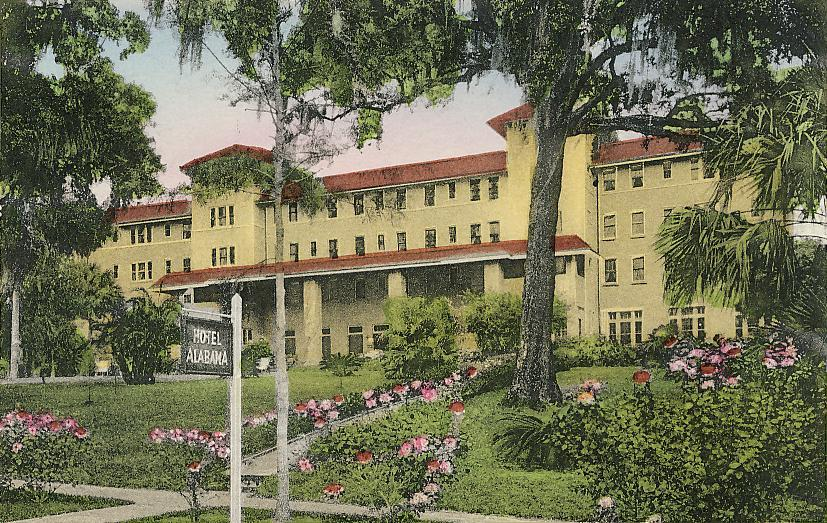
The Hotel Alabama c. 1922

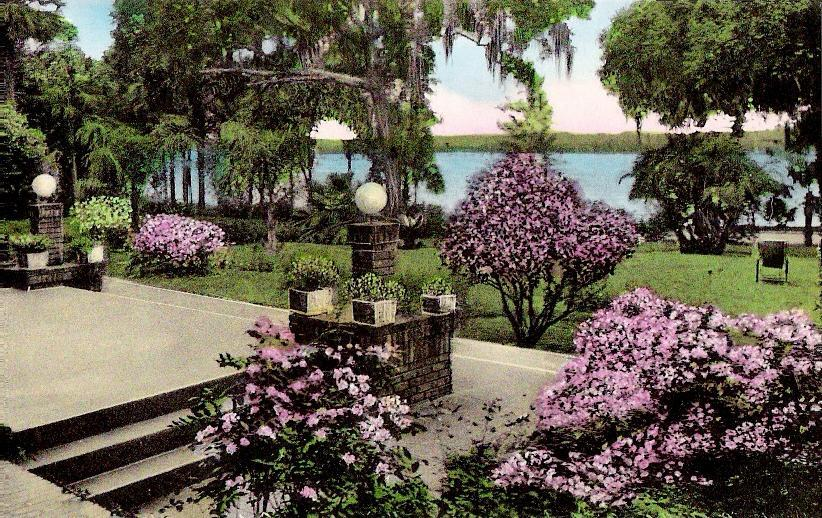
Veranda at the Hotel Alabama c. 1922

In 1885, the Congregational Assembly of Florida started Rollins College, the state's first four-year college. Rollins College today remains one of the hallmarks of Winter Park, an integral part of Winter Park's history and culture. It is the second most expensive college in the state, as of the 2023-2024 academic year the tuition at Rollins is $58,300 per year. Rollins is a relatively good liberal arts school, with a smaller student population, counted as roughly just over 2,000 students. The school also features an MBA program, at the Crummer Graduate School of Business.

In 1886, the Seminole Hotel on Lake Osceola opened. This was a resort complete with the luxuries of the day: gas lights, steam heating, a string orchestra, a formal dining room, a bowling alley, and long covered porches. The street is now a cul-de-sac called Kiwi Circle that is part of one of the nicest neighborhoods in the town.

On October 21, 1887, the town was officially incorporated as the "Town of Winter Park", and, in 1925, it was reincorporated as the "City of Winter Park".

=== Presidential visits ===
The first president to visit was Chester A. Arthur, who reported that Winter Park was "the prettiest place I have seen in Florida",. President Grover Cleveland visited the area and was given a huge reception at the Seminole Hotel on February 23, 1888. He enjoyed the Bounding Horse Cart ride and stated that it was the most pleasant diversion of his Florida trip. The New York Times reported on his visit that "The Philadelphian and Bostonian founders had done a good job with the town."

The following four years both hotel and the town became a fashionable winter resort for northern visitors. The next president to visit the area was Franklin D. Roosevelt in March 1936. He was conferred an honorary degree in literature at Rollins College.

President Barack Obama visited Rollins College on August 2, 2012, to give a speech that was part of his re-election campaign. An interesting note on recent Presidential elections is that Orange County, the county Winter Park is in, was one of the bluest counties in Florida. Although Winter Park is a large mix of both conservative and liberal constituents. However, this mix is evident in US Congressional District 7's last two representatives. Former Republican Congressman John Mica lost reelection in 2016 to newcomer and Democrat Stephanie Murphy. Both have had a lot of support from both sides of the aisle and Murphy is credited with being one of the most centrist representatives in Congress today.

=== Winter Park Public Library ===
The Winter Park Public Library was historically located at 460 E. New England Avenue in the heart of Winter Park. Its origins date back to 1885, when nine women organized to create a lending library for their small community, which was still in its infancy at the time. The Winter Park Public Library underwent major changes and moved to a new site. It opened in late 2021 on a new world-class campus designed by world-renowned architect Sir David Adjaye.

=== Peacocks ===
In 1904, Charles Hosmer Morse became the biggest landowner in Winter Park. His patronage continued in the 1920s, when he purchased a 200-acre parcel between lakes Virginia, Berry, and Mizell. In 1945, Morse's granddaughter Jeannette and her husband Hugh McKean moved to the land, and soon after they added peacocks. Now, the land is a nature preserve that houses an orange grove and over 30 peacocks. Winter Park locals consider the peacock to be a pet to the entire community. The peacock is on the official Winter Park seal, is featured in a number of official city documents, and is protected by the community. Peacocks often roam around in neighborhoods, especially throughout the community of Windsong, where residents are often seen taking care of them.

=== The Winter Park Sinkhole and Lake Rose ===
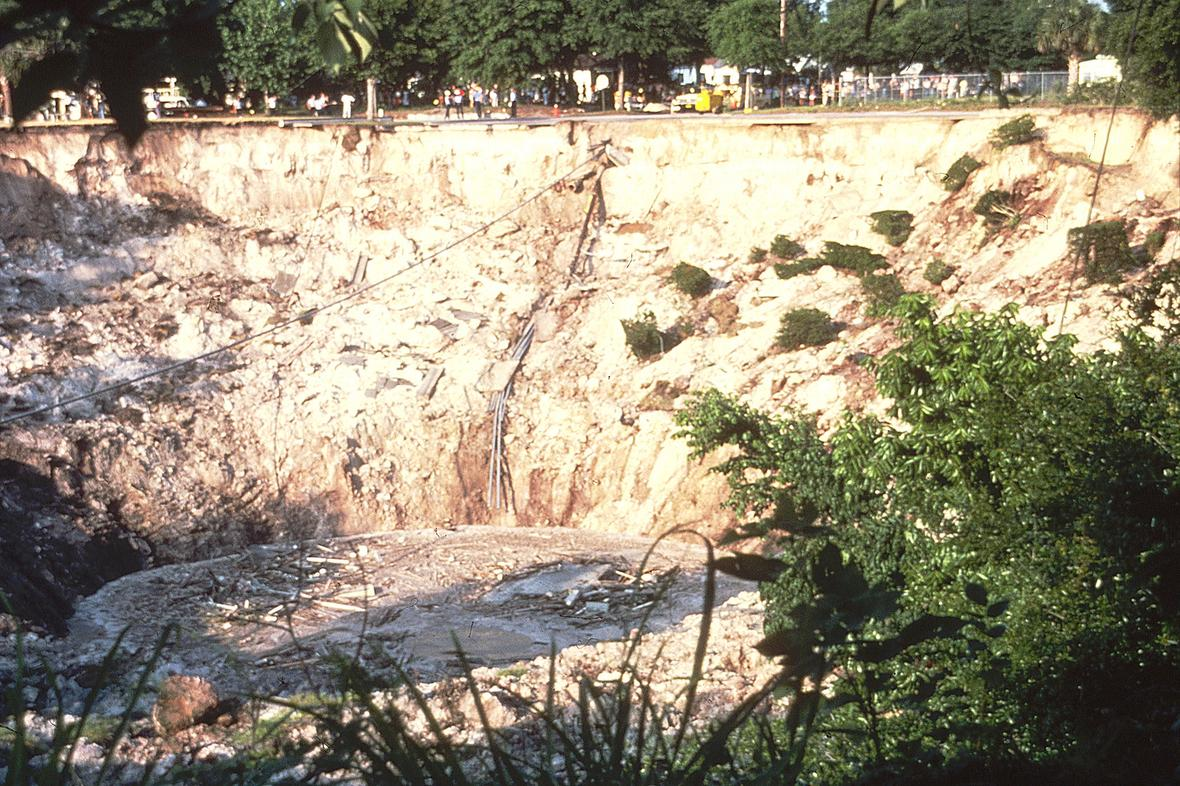
U.S. Geological Survey photo showing large size of 1981 Winter Park, Florida, sinkhole

In 1972, Henry Swanson, an agricultural agent and "resident layman expert on Central Florida water," wrote a letter to the editor warning Orange County mayors of the sinkhole danger that could be posed by overdevelopment and excessive groundwater use. Swanson predicted that the west Winter Park area would be especially at risk. In May 1981, during a period of record-low water levels in Florida's limestone aquifer, a massive sinkhole opened near the corner of Denning Drive and Fairbanks Avenue.

The sinkhole first appeared on the evening of May 8, 1981, near the house of Winter Park resident Mae Rose Williams. Within a few hours, a 40-year-old sycamore tree near her house had fallen into the sinkhole. The next morning, the hole expanded to nearly 40 feet (12 m) wide. In a story in the Orlando Sentinel, she said that as the sun rose, she heard a noise "like giant beavers chewing" as the hole began to devour more of her land. The hole was collapsing rapidly. By noon, as she realized that her home was slipping into the expanding hole, she and the family evacuated and removed their belongings. That afternoon her house fell into the sinkhole, and within a few hours the house was irrevocably on its way into the sinkhole's center, headed to unknown depths.

The hole eventually widened to 320 feet (98 m) and to a depth of 90 feet (27 m). The following fell into the sinkhole: five Porsches at a repair shop, a pickup truck with camper top, the Winter Park municipal pool, and large portions of Denning Drive. By May 9, nearly 250,000 cubic yards (190,000 m^{3}) of earth had fallen into the sinkhole. Damage was estimated at $2 million to $4 million. On May 9, 1981, the sinkhole grew to a record size, gulping down 250,000 cubic yards of soil and taking with it the deep end of an Olympic-size swimming pool, chunks of two streets and Williams' three-bedroom home and yard. Florida engineers have described the event as "the largest sinkhole event witnessed by man as a result of natural geological reasons or conditions." They based their statements on his study of 2,000 sinkholes over more than 40 years. That opinion was echoed by Ardaman & Associates, a local engineering consulting firm.

The sinkhole drew national attention and became a popular tourist attraction during the summer of 1981. A carnival-like atmosphere arose around the area, with vendors selling food, balloons, and T-shirts to visitors. The city of Winter Park sold sinkhole photographs for promotional and educational purposes. On July 9, 1981, Winter Park began selling sinkhole photographs to educate the community about sinkholes and to promote tourism. The sinkhole began to fill with water that summer, but on July 19, the water level suddenly dropped by a reported 15 to 20 feet (4.6 to 6.1 m).

As the novelty wore off, the city worked to repair the damage. Workers were able to recover four of the six vehicles that fell into the sinkhole, including the travel trailer, whose owner drove it away, and three of the five Porsches. The other two remain at the bottom of the lake with Mae Rose Owens' home. Engineers filled in the bottom with dirt and concrete. Diver reports from 2009 suggest that the lake has since been used to dispose of unwanted vehicles. Besides a 1987 incident in which the bottom of the lake suddenly dropped 20 feet (6.1 m), causing erosion on the southern rim, the stabilized sinkhole has been generally quiet.

=== The Langford Resort Hotel ===
The Langford Hotel served as a gateway to "Old Florida" attractions in Central Florida and a community social hub for decades.

Famous guests included Dean Martin, Frank Sinatra, Ray Charles, Larry King, Hugh Hefner, John Denver, Langford winter resident Lady Bird Johnson, and President Ronald Reagan and his wife Nancy Reagan, who celebrated their 24th wedding anniversary there. Reagan gave a campaign speech at Rollins College and stayed at the Langford in 1976.

The Langford was celebrated in a party in late 1999, closed, and was demolished. A portion of the former Langford property (as of mid-2009) has been developed into luxury mid-rise condominiums. The remaining parcel was redeveloped and in 2014, a boutique hotel named the Alfond Inn, owned and operated by Rollins College opened at the site of the original Langford Hotel. The Alfond Inn was built with a $12.5 million grant from the Harold Alfond Foundation. Net operating income from the Inn is directed to The Alfond Scholars program fund, the College's premier scholarship fund.

=== The Temple Grove ===
An orange grove, known as the Temple Grove, stood on the south side of Palmer Avenue just east of Temple Drive. The temple orange was grown on the old Wyeth grove on Palmer Avenue (later Temple Grove) owned at the time by Louis A. Hakes, whose son was the first to notify Temple of the different quality of the new orange. The orange was introduced and cataloged by Buckeye Nursery in 1917, the year W. C. Temple died. Myron E. Gillett and his son D. Collins Gillett later went on to plant the largest orange grove in the world in the 1920s (5,000 acres (2,000 ha)) in Temple Terrace, Florida.

=== The Winter Park Sidewalk Art Festival ===
The Winter Park Sidewalk Art Festival is one of the nation's oldest, largest juried outdoor art festivals, rated among the top shows by Sunshine Artist and American Style magazines. In 2012, about 1,200 artists from around the world applied for entry, and an independent panel of judges selected 225 national and international artists to attend the show. The National Endowment for the Arts, the White House, Congress, and many others have lauded the Festival for promoting art and art education in Central Florida. An all-volunteer board of directors runs the annual festival.

== Geography ==
According to the United States Census Bureau, the city has a total area of 10.2 square miles (26.3 km^{2}), of which 8.7 square miles (22.5 km^{2}) is land and 1.5 square miles (3.9 km^{2}) (14.62%) is water. It is nestled among the Winter Park Chain of Lakes, a series of lakes interconnected by a series of navigable canals, which were originally created for flood control and to run logs to a sawmill on present-day Lake Virginia. The lakes are popular for boating, watersports, fishing and swimming, and boat tours are available.

The city is traversed by the old East Florida and Atlantic Railroad ("Dinky Line") railroad bed, which until the 1960s had a stop at Lake Virginia/Rollins College at the city park now known as Dinky Dock. Much of this right of way has been converted to a rail-trail pedestrian/biking path in the form of the Cady Way Trail, which leads from Cady Way Park toward the Baldwin Park neighborhood and downtown Orlando, and in the opposite direction to Oviedo and beyond (via the Florida Trail), due to a new pedestrian bridge spanning Semoran Boulevard (SR 436) in Orange County.

SunRail operates a rail line through Winter Park on the former Atlantic Coast Line, with an Amtrak and SunRail commuter rail station in downtown's historic Central Park.

=== Climate ===
The climate in this area is characterized by hot, humid summers and generally mild winters. According to the Köppen climate classification, the City of Winter Park has a humid subtropical climate zone (Cfa).

== Demographics ==
Historical population
Census	Pop.	Note	%±
1890	270		—
1900	366		35.6%
1910	570		55.7%
1920	1,078		89.1%
1930	3,686		241.9%
1940	4,715		27.9%
1950	8,250		75.0%
1960	17,162		108.0%
1970	21,895		27.6%
1980	22,339		2.0%
1990	22,242		−0.4%
2000	24,090		8.3%
2010	27,852		15.6%
2020	29,795		7.0%
U.S. Decennial Census; Florida Department of Agriculture

=== Racial and ethnic composition ===
Winter Park racial composition (Hispanics excluded from racial categories) (NH = Non-Hispanic)
Race	Pop 2010	Pop 2020	% 2010	% 2020
White (NH)	22,755	21,852	81.70%	73.34%
Black or African American (NH)	2,034	2,055	7.30%	6.90%
Native American or Alaska Native (NH)	35	40	0.13%	0.13%
Asian (NH)	632	1,061	2.27%	3.56%
Pacific Islander or Native Hawaiian (NH)	5	8	0.02%	0.03%
Some other race (NH)	52	143	0.19%	0.48%
Two or more races/Multiracial (NH)	396	1,119	1.42%	3.76%
Hispanic or Latino (any race)	1,943	3,517	6.98%	11.80%
Total	27,852	29,795		

=== 2020 census ===
As of the 2020 census, Winter Park had a population of 29,795. The median age was 44.5 years. 17.8% of residents were under the age of 18 and 23.0% of residents were 65 years of age or older. For every 100 females there were 89.3 males, and for every 100 females age 18 and over there were 85.7 males age 18 and over.

100.0% of residents lived in urban areas, while 0.0% lived in rural areas.

There were 12,729 households in Winter Park, of which 24.5% had children under the age of 18 living in them. Of all households, 45.7% were married-couple households, 18.3% were households with a male householder and no spouse or partner present, and 30.3% were households with a female householder and no spouse or partner present. About 34.1% of all households were made up of individuals and 16.5% had someone living alone who was 65 years of age or older.

There were 14,073 housing units, of which 9.6% were vacant. The homeowner vacancy rate was 2.6% and the rental vacancy rate was 10.5%.

Racial composition as of the 2020 census
Race	Number	Percent
White	22,844	76.7%
Black or African American	2,146	7.2%
American Indian and Alaska Native	64	0.2%
Asian	1,078	3.6%
Native Hawaiian and Other Pacific Islander	11	0.0%
Some other race	800	2.7%
Two or more races	2,852	9.6%
Hispanic or Latino (of any race)	3,517	11.8%

=== 2010 census ===
As of the 2010 United States census, there were 27,852 people, 11,995 households, and 6,419 families residing in the city.

== Economy ==
=== Personal income ===
As of 2020, the median income for a household in the city was $80,500, and the median income for a family was $130,120. Males had a median income of $83,738 versus $58,277 for females. The per capita income for the city was $65,481. About 7.0% of families and 9.9% of the population were below the poverty line, including 11.4% of those under age 18 and 10.2% of those age 65 or over.

=== Tourism ===
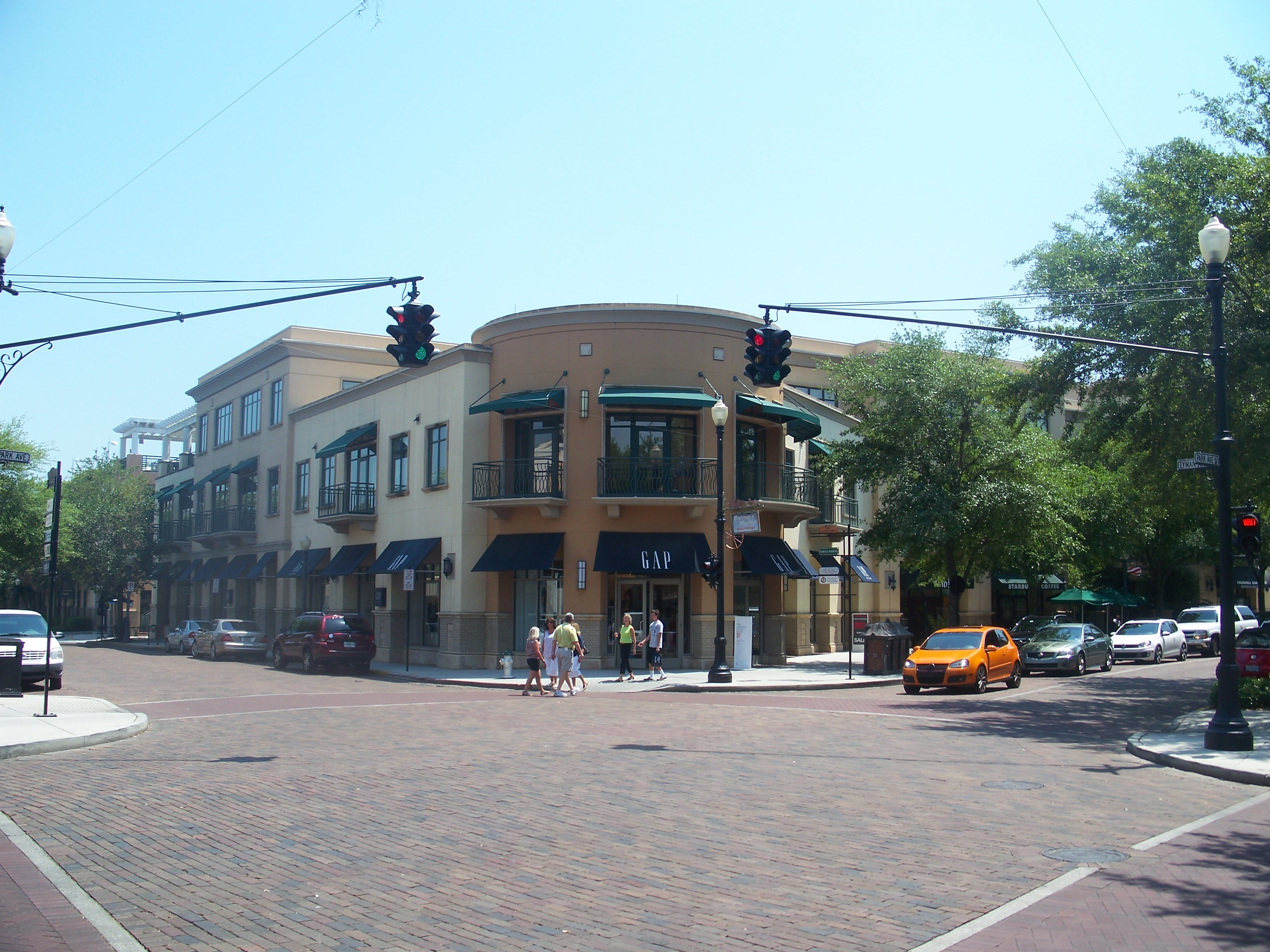
Downtown Winter Park

Scenic Olde Winter Park area is punctuated by small, winding brick streets, and a canopy of old southern live oak and camphor trees, draped with Spanish moss. There are hundreds of thousands of visitors to annual festivals including the Bach Festival, the nationally ranked Sidewalk Art Festival, and the Winter Park Concours d'Elegance. Winter Park is often seen as a popular tourist destination for those visiting Orlando that want an escape from the typical tourist scene of the Orlando theme parks. There is a quaint, local feel to the town even though there are a lot of tourists, especially during the winter months and holidays.

Within the city is the Mead Botanical Garden which is a 47.6 acres (19.3 ha) park that encompasses several ecosystems. It has an amphitheater, butterfly garden, discovery barn and a recreation center. Many structures are more than 100 years old.

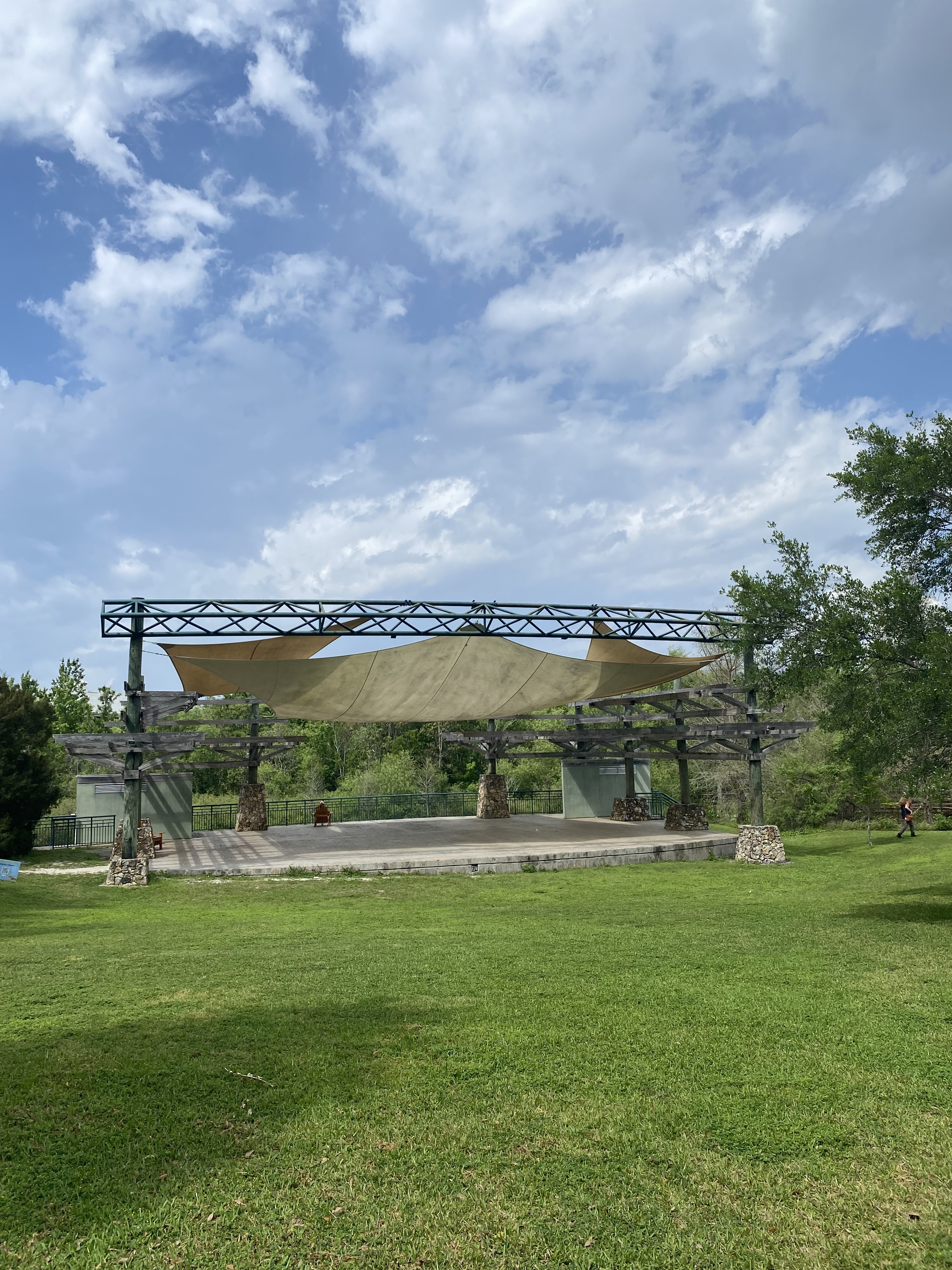
The Grove at Mead Botanical Garden

=== Industry ===
Bonnier Corporation is based in Winter Park. D100 Radio was founded here and is still present in Winter Park.

According to the City's 2021 Comprehensive Annual Financial Report, the top employers in the city are:

#	Employer	# of Employees
1	AdventHealth Winter Park	1,600
2	Gecos Inc	1,400
3	Orange County Public Schools	650
4	Rollins College	645
5	City of Winter Park	535
6	Publix Super Markets	300

== Arts and culture ==
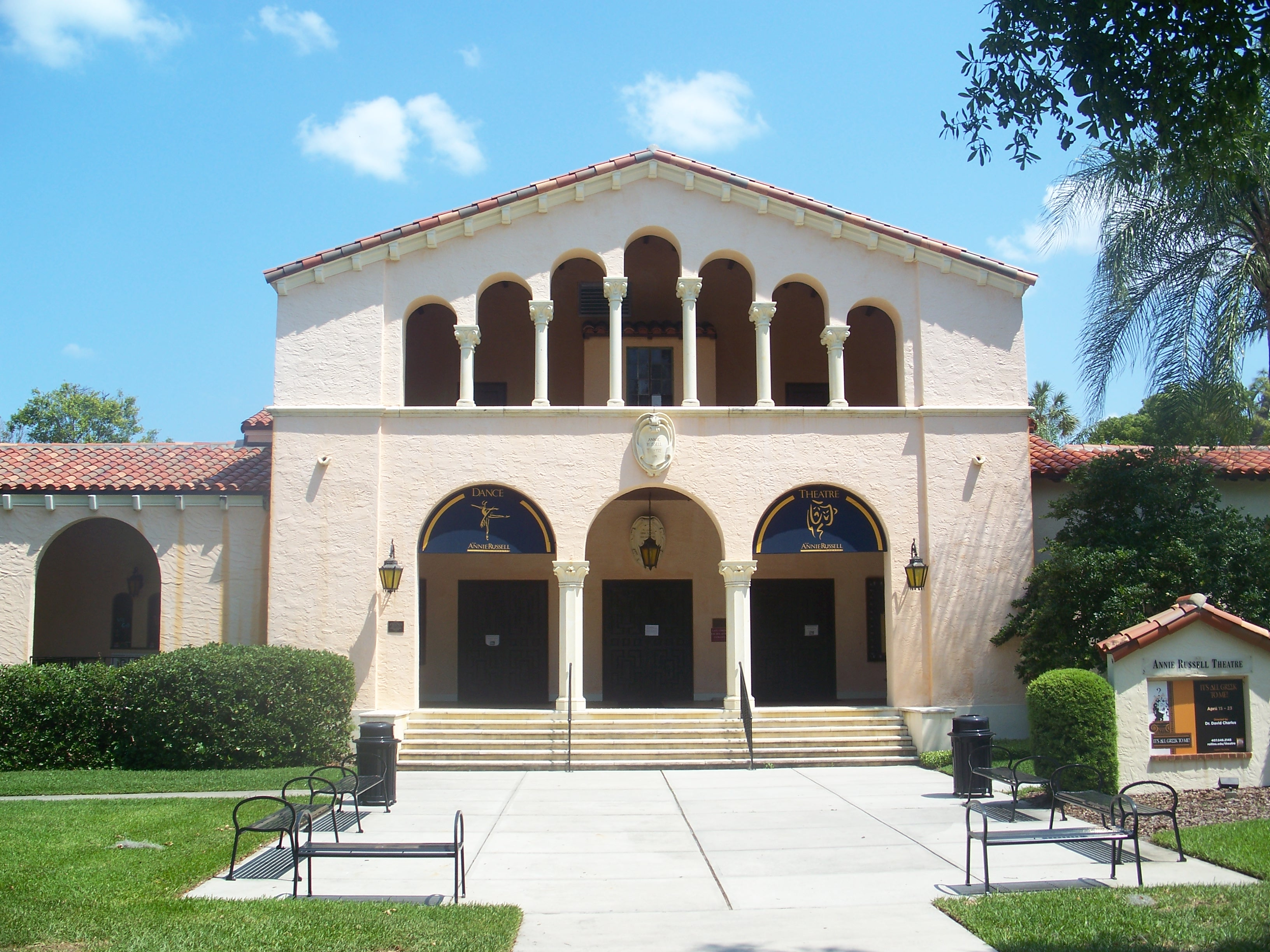
Annie Russell Theatre, located on the campus of Rollins College

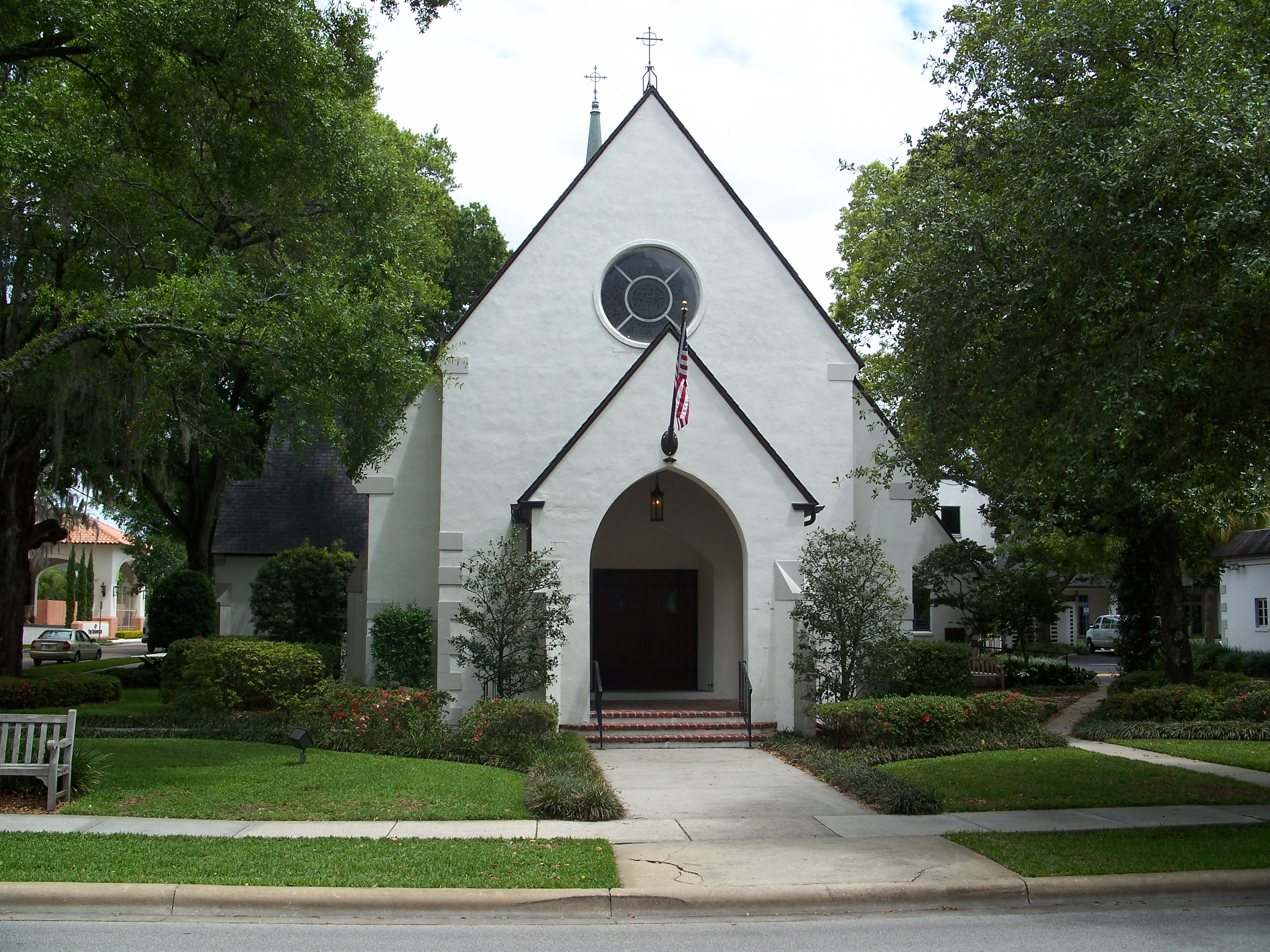
All Saints Episcopal Church

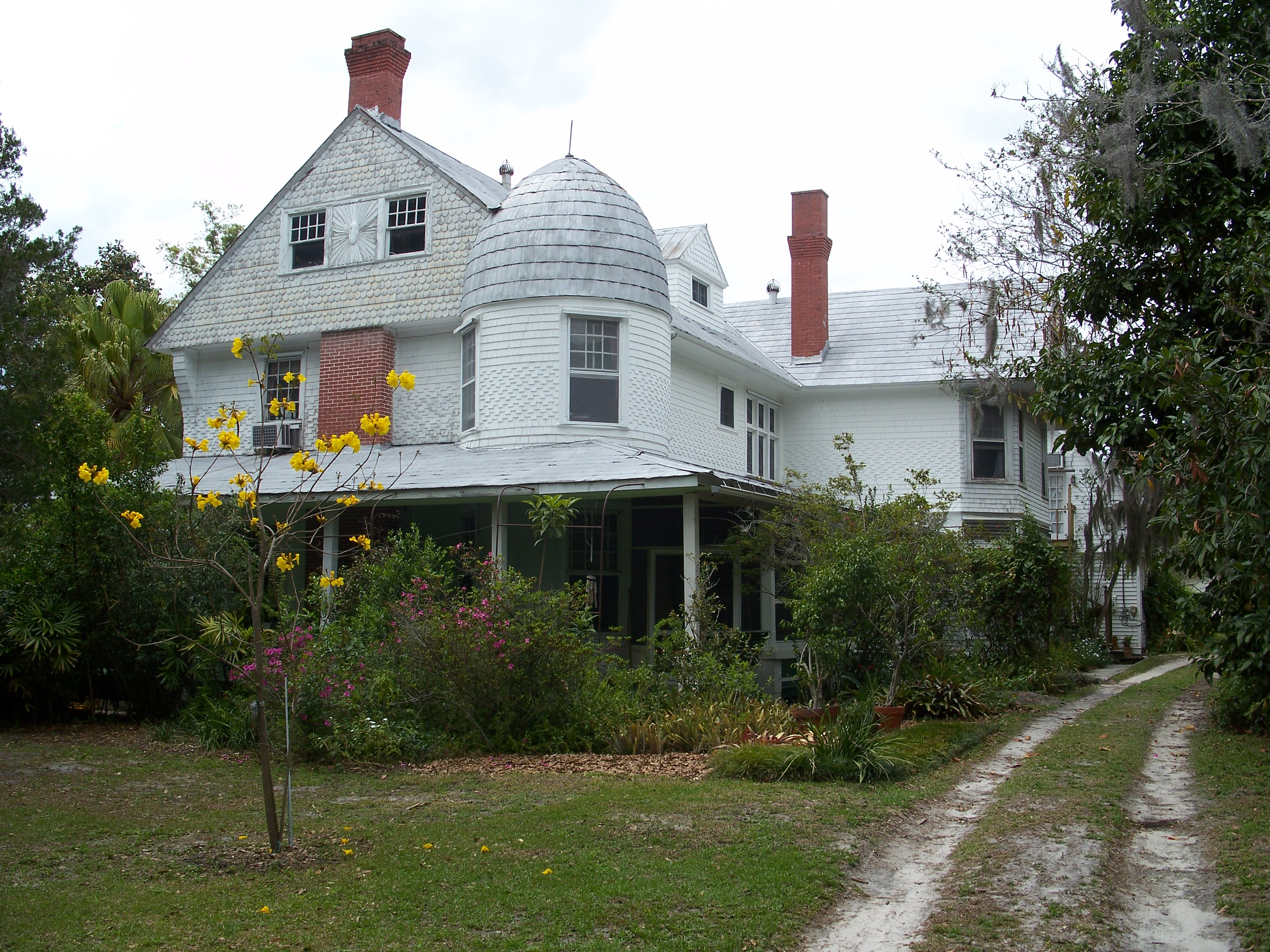
Comstock-Harris House

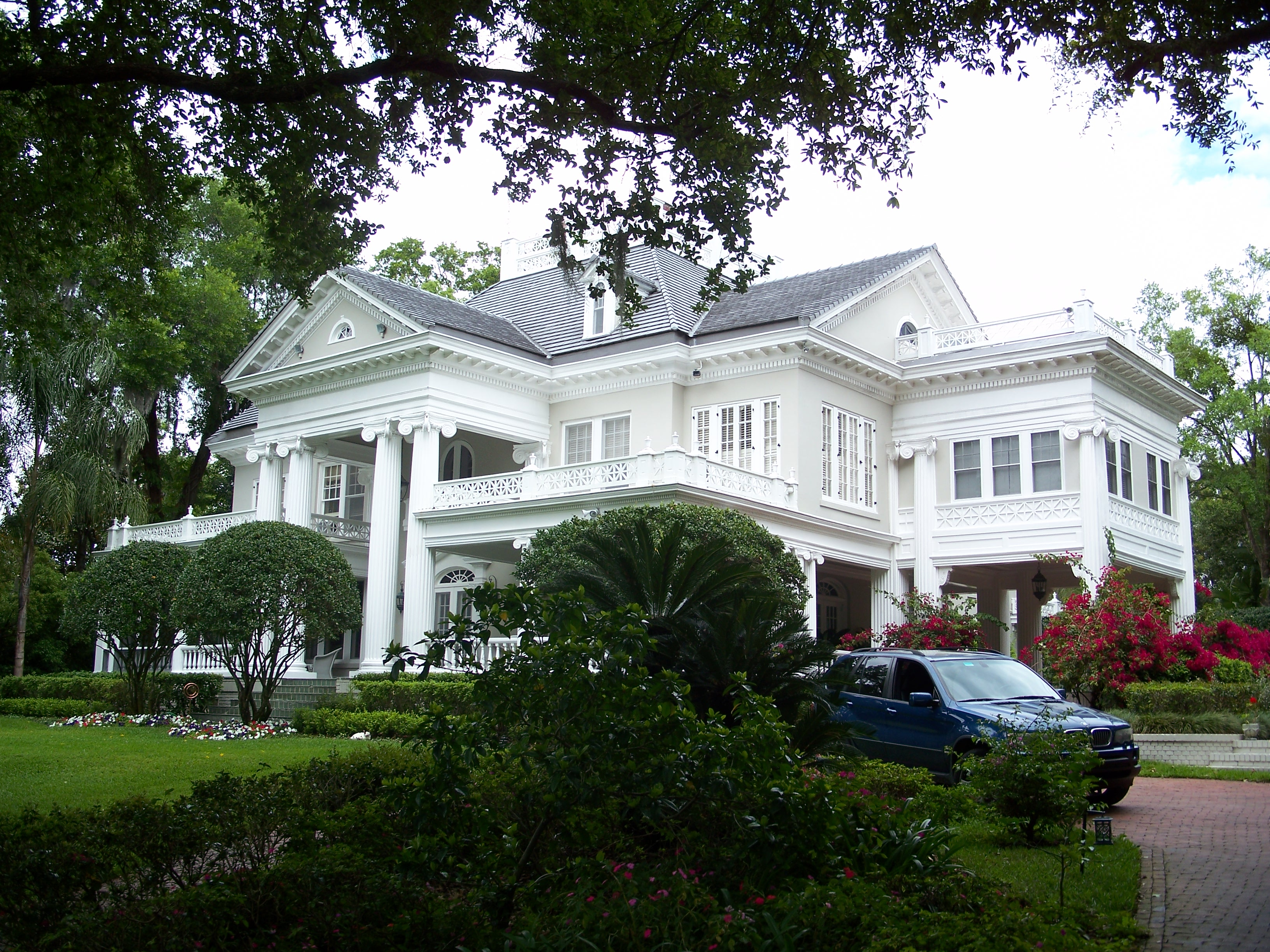
Edward Hill Brewer House

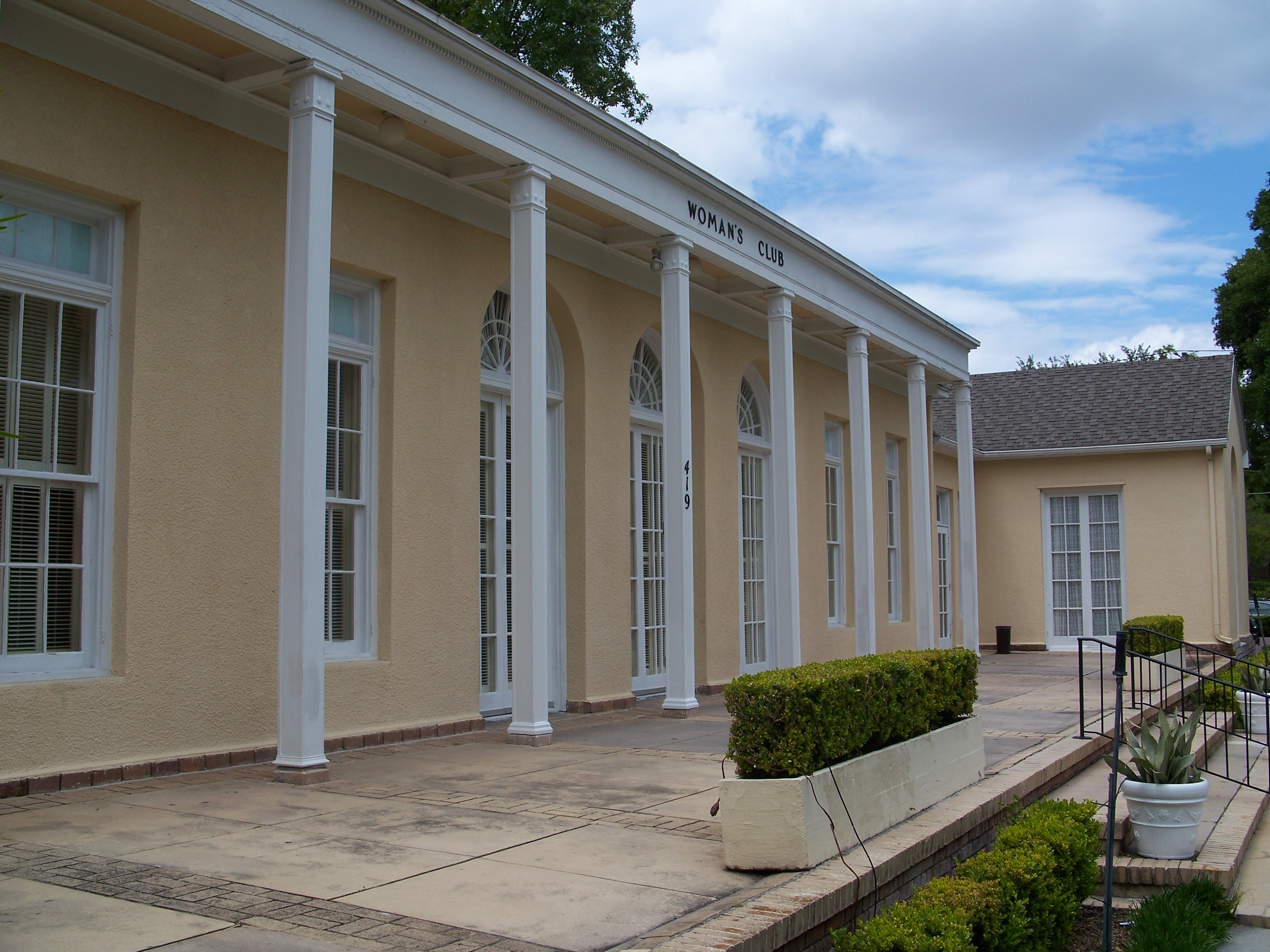
Woman's Club of Winter Park

Sites of interest include:

- Albin Polasek Museum and Sculpture Gardens
- All Saints Episcopal Church
- Annie Russell Theatre
- Casa Feliz Historic House Museum
- Charles Hosmer Morse Museum of American Art
- Comstock-Harris House
- D100 Studio One (closed to the public)
- Downtown Winter Park Historic District
- Edward Hill Brewer House
- Hannibal Square
- Hannibal Square Heritage Center
- Knowles Memorial Chapel
- Kraft Azalea Park
- Lake Baldwin Park
- Mead Botanical Garden
- Mount Moriah Missionary Baptist Church
- Palm Cemetery
- Rollins Museum of Art
- St. Margaret Mary Catholic Church
- Winter Park Historical Museum
- Winter Park Playhouse, founded in 2002.
- Winter Park Public Library
- Winter Park Sidewalk Art Festival
- Woman's Club of Winter Park

== Education ==
Winter Park is served by Orange County Public Schools.

=== Elementary schools ===
- Aloma Elementary School
- Brookshire Elementary School
- Lakemont Elementary School

=== Middle school ===
- Glenridge Middle School

=== High schools ===
- Lake Howell High School
- Winter Park High School

=== Private schools ===
- Chesterton Academy of Orlando
- St. Margaret Mary Catholic School (K-8)
- The Geneva School (K-12)
- The Parke House Academy
- Trinity Preparatory School

=== Higher learning ===
- Crealde School of Art
- Fortis College, Winter Park Campus
- Full Sail University
- Rollins College
- Valencia College, Winter Park Campus
- Winter Park Tech

== Transportation ==
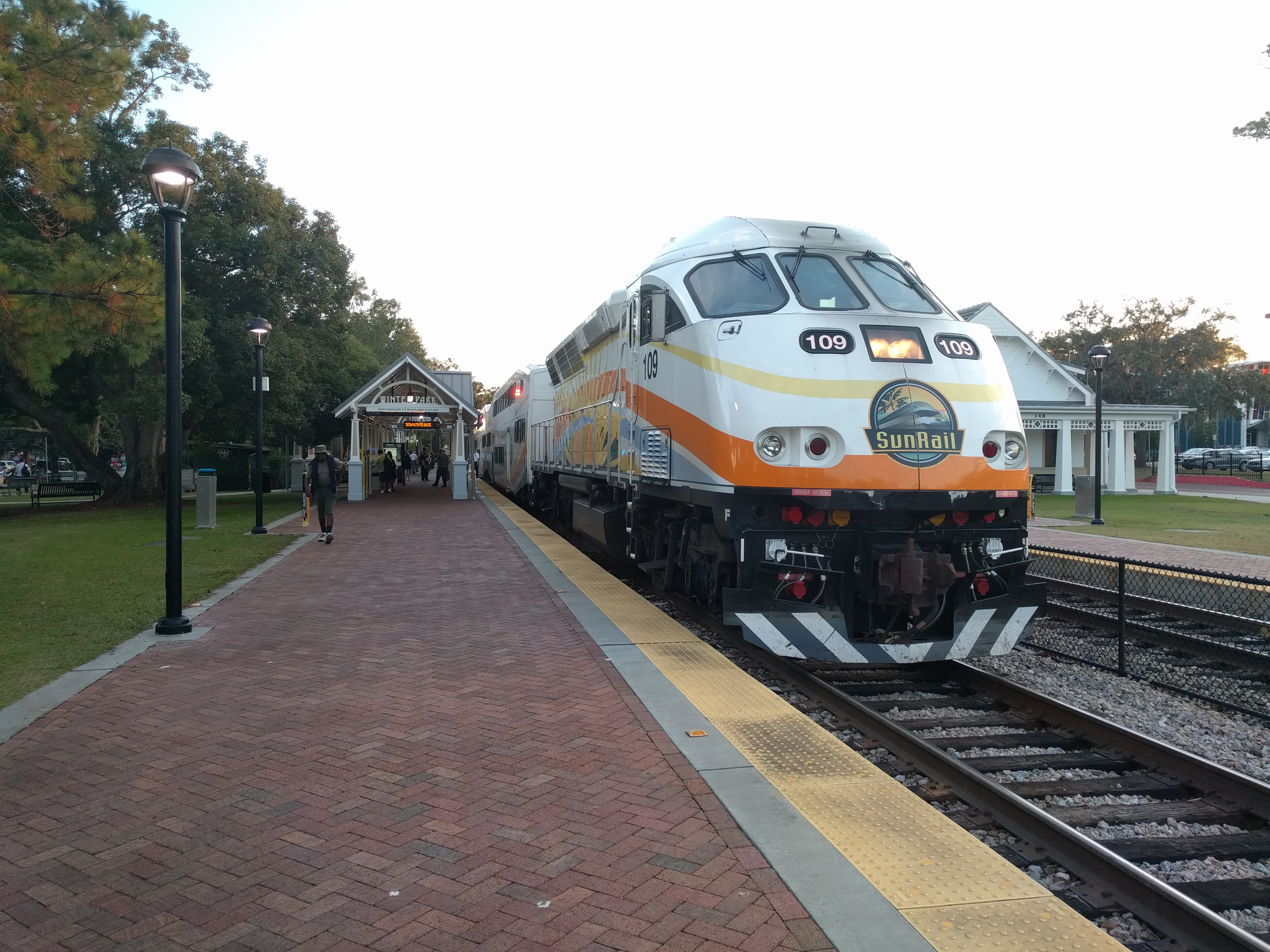
A SunRail commuter train at Winter Park Station

=== Public transit ===
- Lynx
- Winter Park station (SunRail/Amtrak)

=== Major roads ===
- I-4 (Interstate 4)
- US 17 / US 92 (Orlando Avenue)
- SR 423 (Lee Road)
- SR 426 (Fairbanks Avenue / Aloma Avenue)
- SR 527 (Orange Avenue)
