= D100 Radio New York =

Internet radio station in New York City, NY, US

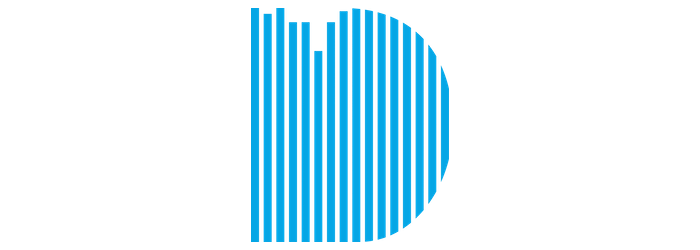
- Industry: Media; Internet radio
- Founded: July 25, 2014; 11 years ago
- Founder: Dylan Carollo
- Headquarters: New York City, New York, U.S.
- Key people: Dylan Carollo (CEO); Nikolai Eggleton (CFO)
- Owner: D100 Media
- Website: d100radio.com

D100 Radio New York is an Internet radio station headquartered in One World Trade Center in New York City. The station primarily focuses on Top 40/CHR music programming that features content from various continents. The station broadcasts through iHeartRadio, Apple Music, and Live365, also having its own mobile application and website for listening.

== History ==
D100 Radio was founded in 2014 by Dylan Carollo in Winter Park, Florida. The station was originally produced on a podcast platform with pre-recorded episodes. D100 Radio then moved to a livestream format, creating programs with content that focuses on various cultures. In 2025, D100 Radio announced a broader venture and its new parent company, D100 Media.

== Philanthropy ==
=== D100 Radio's On the Frontlines COVID-19 First Responder Fundraiser ===
In April 2020, D100 Radio announced a fundraiser that benefitted eight healthcare organizations across six U.S. cities in wake of the COVID-19 pandemic. The fundraiser was interactive for listeners, where they could donate to their desired organization, and the fundraiser was supported by UPS for logistical support. At its conclusion in May 2020, the fundraiser allocated approximately $30,000 throughout a two-week period.

=== D100 Radio's "Talk College to Me" Podcast ===
In September 2020, D100 Radio announced "Talk College to Me", a podcast that focused on the college application process in the wake of COVID-19. The podcast was available through Apple Podcasts, with its hosts being Carollo, a fellow student, and two high school college counselors in Florida and Tennessee. "Talk College to Me" featured admission counselors from various higher education institutions around the United States.
