= Edward Hill Brewer House =

Historic house in Florida, United States

- U.S. National Register of Historic Places
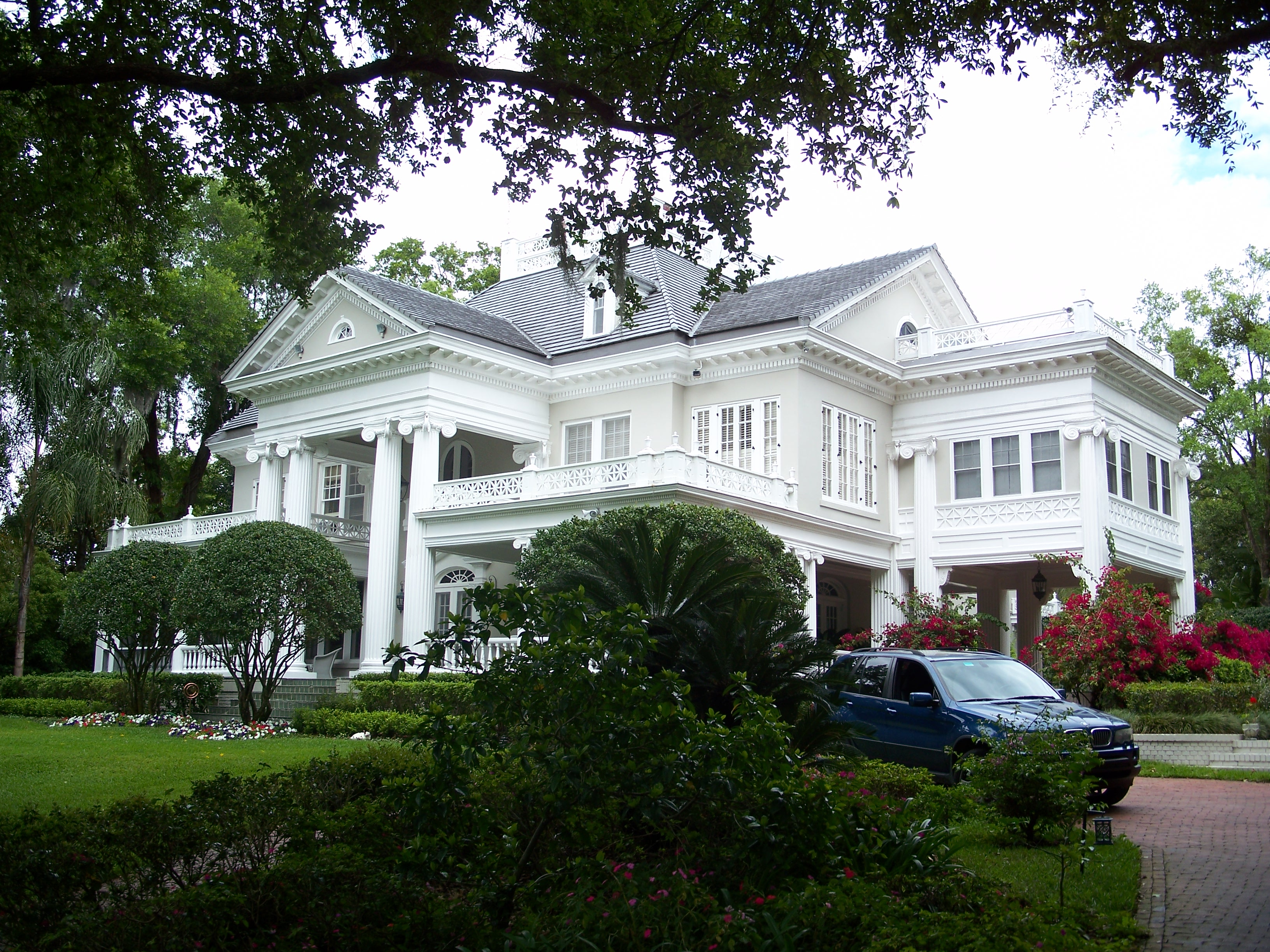

- Location within Florida Location within the United States
- Location: Winter Park, Florida
- Coordinates: 28°36′3″N 81°20′33″W
- Built: 1899
- Architectural style: Colonial Revival
- NRHP reference No.: 82002378
- Added to NRHP: April 22, 1982

The Edward Hill Brewer House (also known as The Palms) is a historic home in Winter Park, Florida. It is located at 240 Trismen Terrace and was added to the National Register of Historic Places on April 22, 1982.

== History ==
In 1895, the Brewer family first visited Winter Park, searching for a warmer climate to escape New York's winters. In 1898, Edward Brewer, an industrialist, bought forty acres of land to construct a house. Construction began in 1899. He named the house "The Palms" and frequently entertained the community there. In 1923, Brewer renovated the house to more closely his resemble his Colonial Revival mansion in New York. In 1938, the Brewer family sold the home.

== Gallery ==
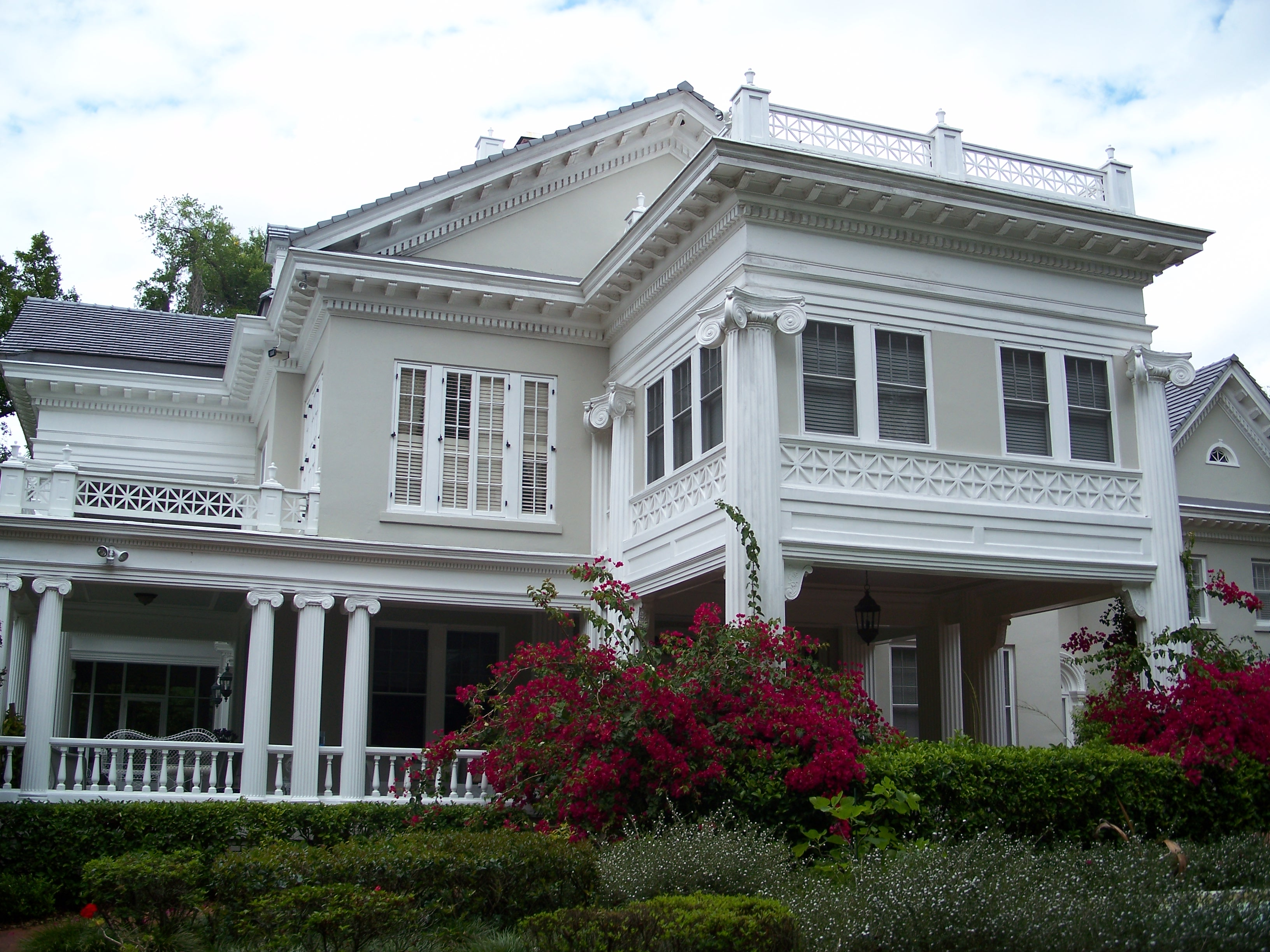

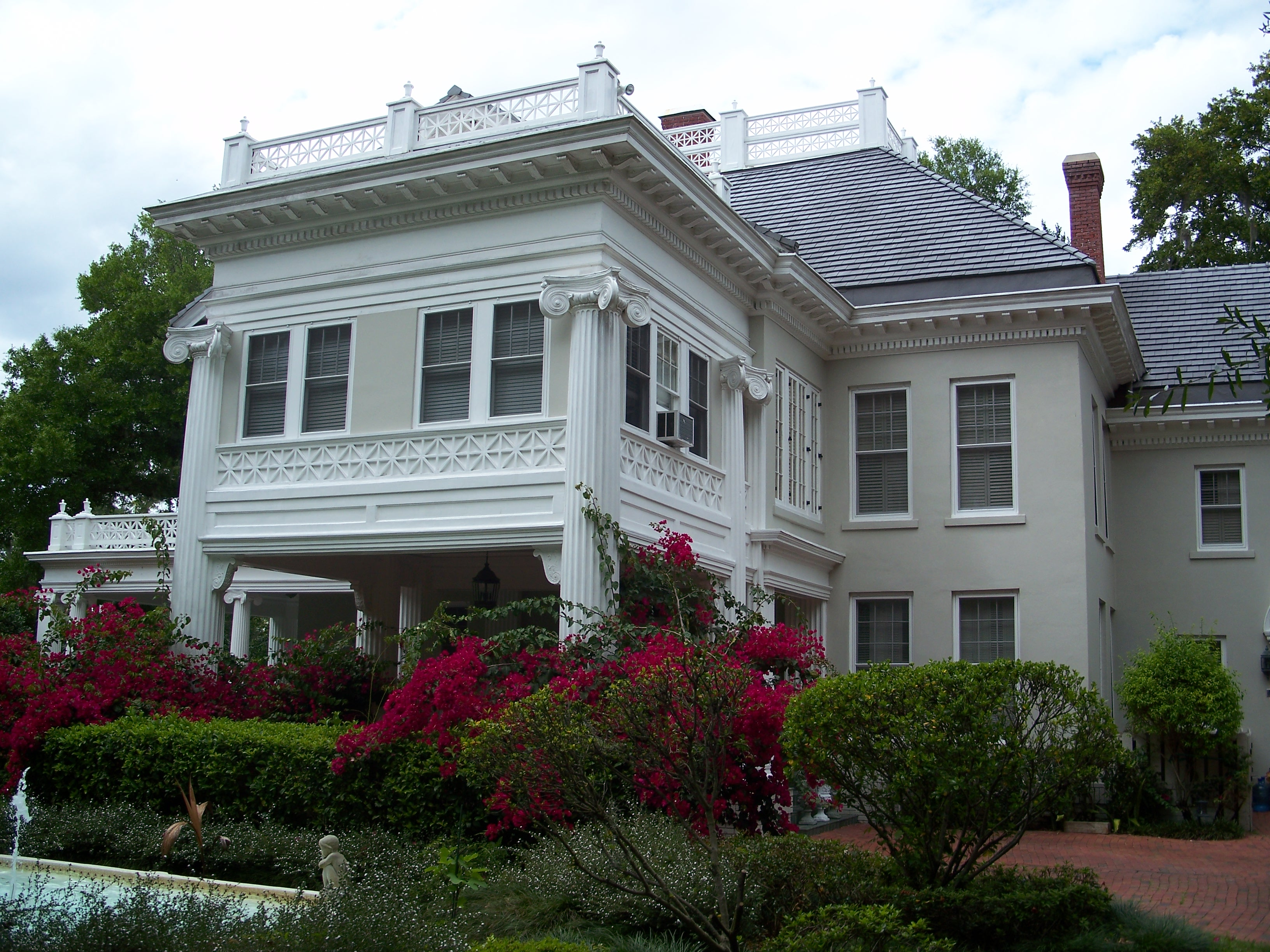

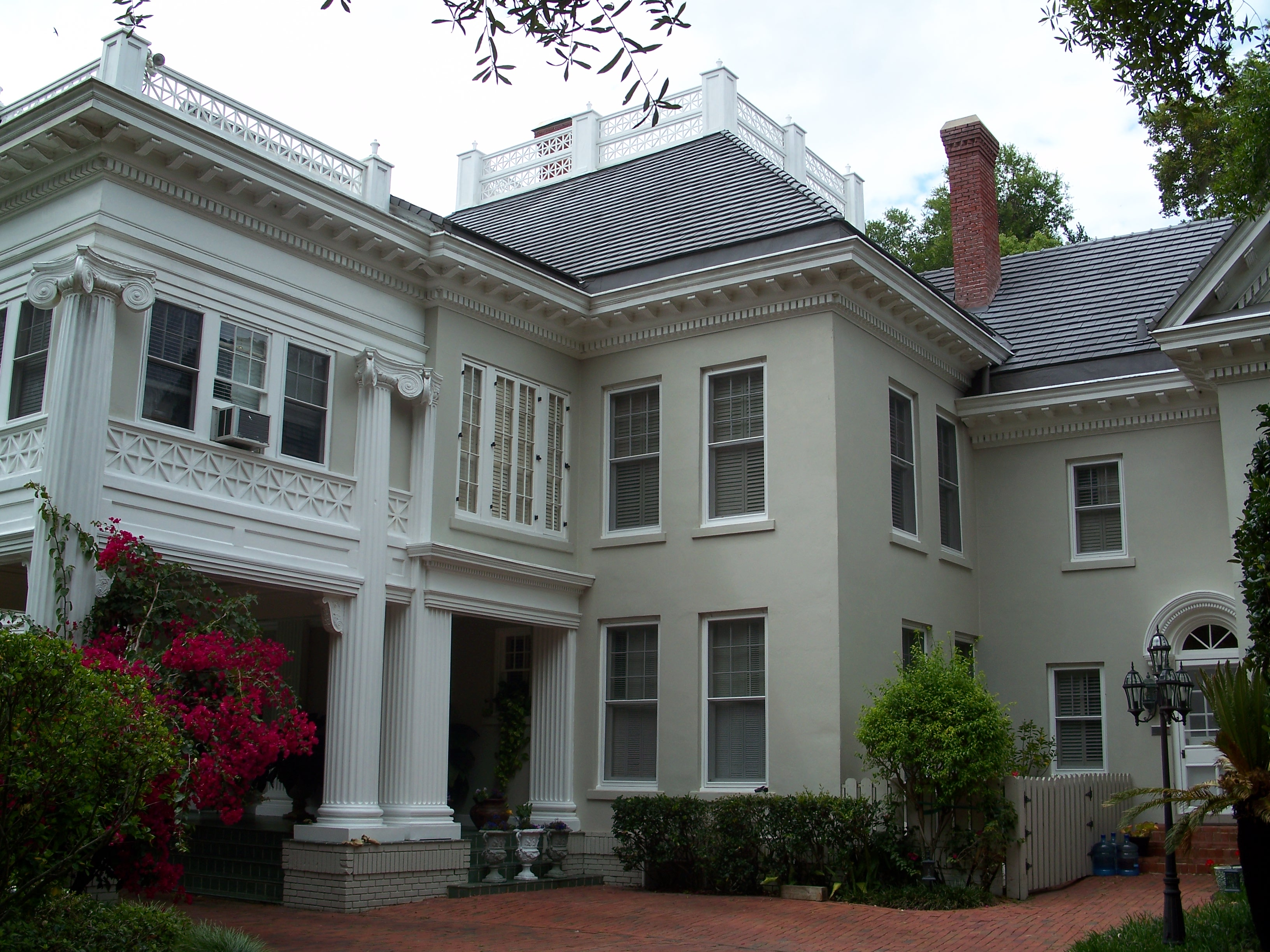
