= Comstock-Harris House =

Historic house in Florida, United States

- U.S. National Register of Historic Places
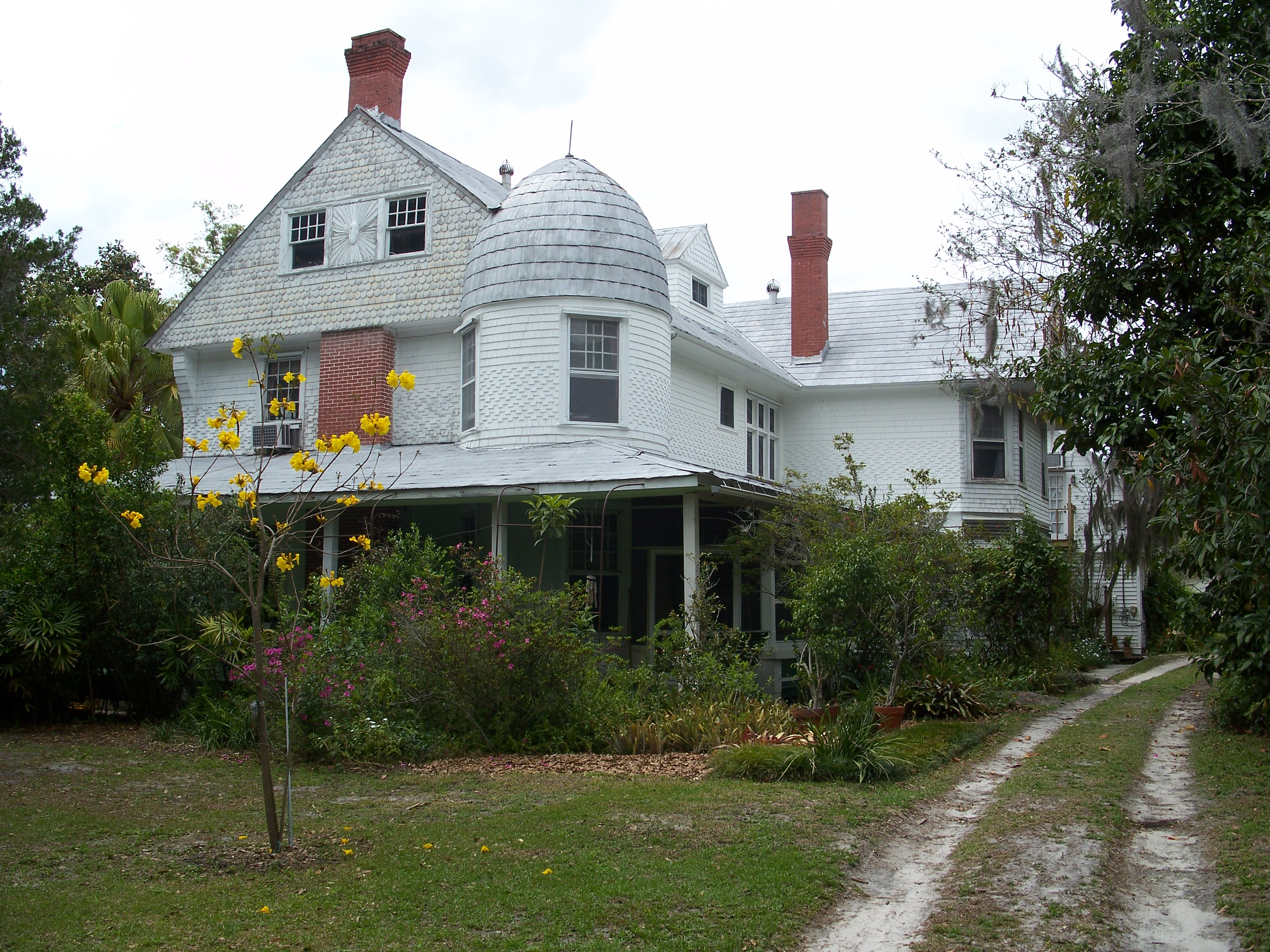

- Location within Florida Location within the United States
- Location: Winter Park, Florida
- Coordinates: 28°36′19″N 81°20′8″W
- Built: 1878
- Architectural style: Queen Anne
- NRHP reference No.: 83001432
- Added to NRHP: January 13, 1983

The Comstock-Harris House, also known as Eastbank, is a historic home in Winter Park, Florida. It is located at 724 Bonita Drive. It was added to the National Register of Historic Places on January 13, 1983. It is the oldest surviving home in Winter Park.

== History ==
A small home was built on the site of the present house in 1878. In 1883, William C. Comstock, a Chicago businessman, finished construction into its current incarnation, that of a large Queen Anne style estate. The Comstock-Harris House, also known as Eastbank, is the oldest surviving home in Winter Park. It is situated on the east bank of Lake Osceola.

Originally a winter cottage, it consists of three floors and three stairways. The main staircase turns in front of a stained glass window. Red bricks make up the foundation of the house as well as the six interior fireplaces. The original color of the house was yellow with dark green trim. Before the grounds were subdivided, they consisted of sixty acres. Camphor trees lined the long drive that led to the house, which is now Bonita Drive.

Comstock died in 1924. The house was then sold to a Mr. Lasbury and then sold again in 1928 to John Harris. It has remained in the family since then.
