= Downtown Winter Park Historic District =

Historic district in Florida, United States

- U.S. National Register of Historic Places
- U.S. Historic district
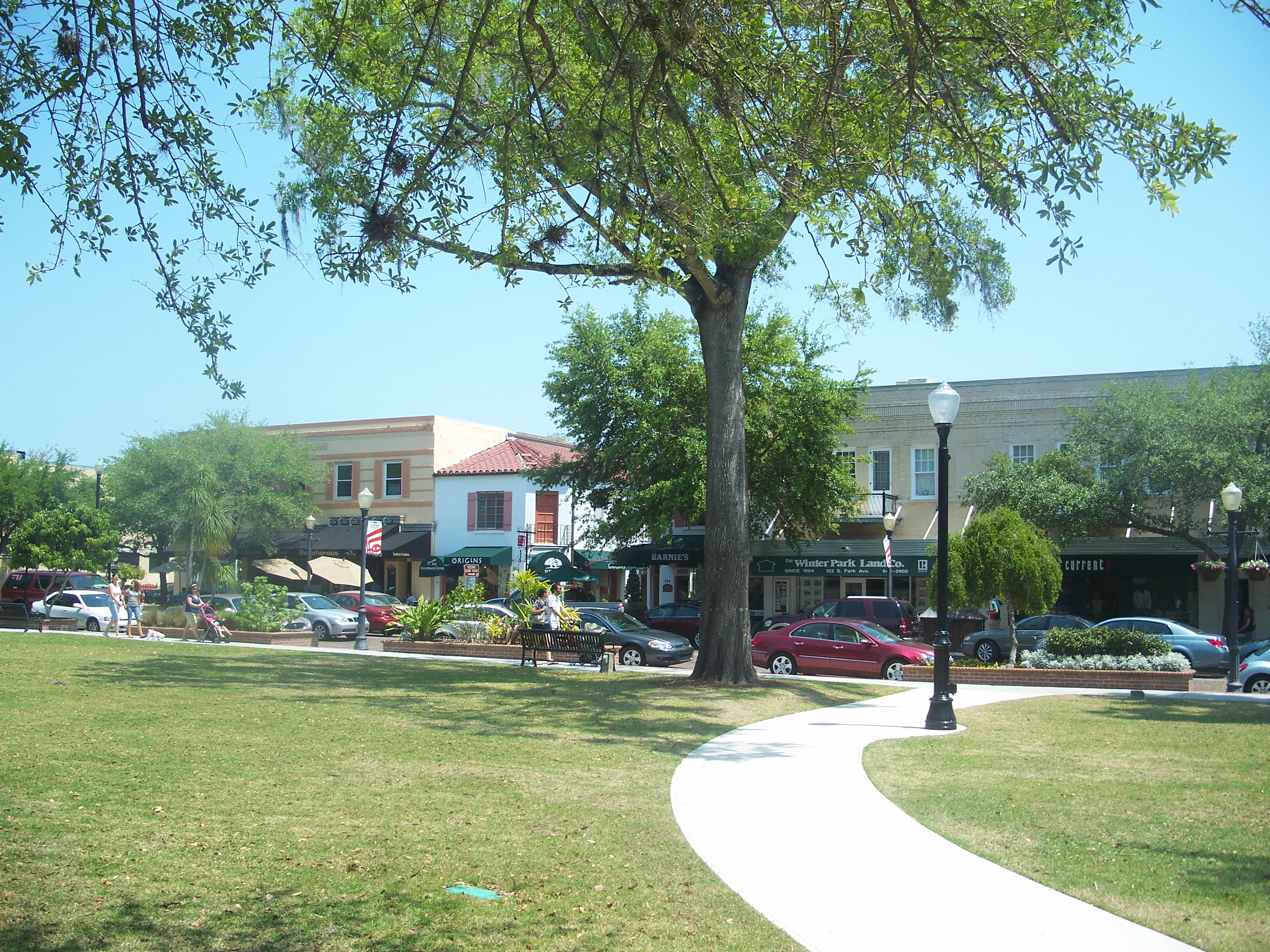
- Downtown Winter Park Historic District

- Location within Florida Location within the United States
- Location: Winter Park, Florida
- Coordinates: 28°35′50″N 81°21′07″W
- Built: 1881
- MPS: "Downtown Winter Park Historic District" (PDF). City of Winter Park.
- NRHP reference No.: 11000158
- Added to NRHP: May 3, 2011

Downtown Winter Park Historic District is a national historic district in Winter Park, Florida, Orange County. Including buildings constructed from 1882 through 1965, runs along Park Avenue from Canton to Comstock avenues.

It was added to the National Register of Historic Places in 2011.
