= St. Margaret Mary Church (Winter Park, Florida) =

Church in Florida, United States

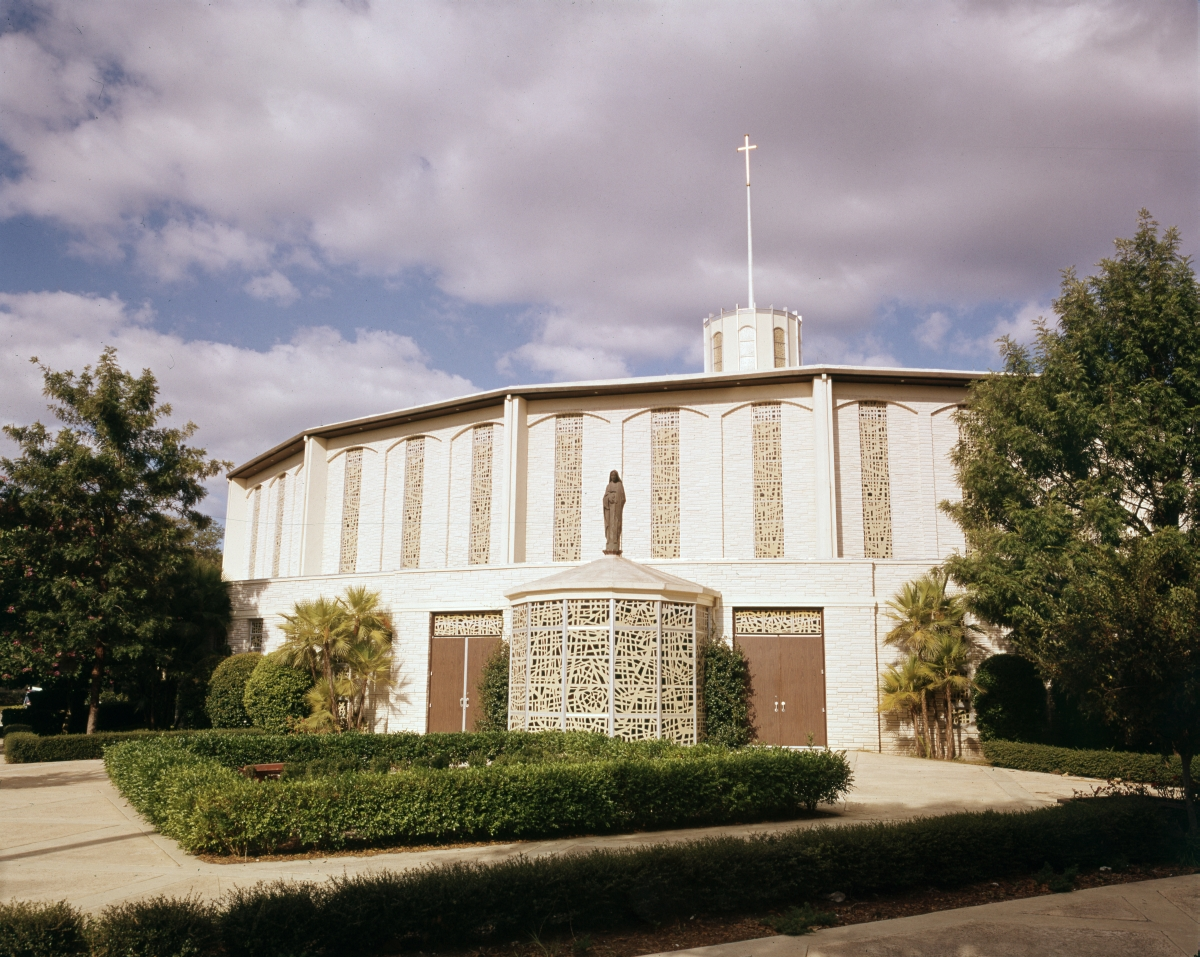
- St. Margaret Mary Church
- 28°36′03″N 81°21′03″W
- Location: 526 N. Park Avenue; Winter Park, Florida, 32789
- Country: United States
- Denomination: Catholic Church
- Sui iuris church: Latin Church
- Website: http://www.stmargaretmary.org

History
- Founded: December 28, 1924
- Dedicated: January 30, 1927

Administration
- Province: Ecclesiastical Province of Miami
- Diocese: Diocese of Orlando
- Deanery: Eastern

Clergy
- Archbishop: The Most Reverend Thomas Wenski
- Bishop: The Most Rev. John Gerard Noonan
- Pastor: Msgr. Richard Walsh

St. Margaret Mary Church is a Catholic parish located in Winter Park, Florida. It is named after St Margaret Mary Alacoque, the French Catholic Visitation nun and mystic who promoted devotion to the Sacred Heart of Jesus.

== History ==
The first Mass held at St. Margaret Mary was celebrated in the new church on December 28, 1924. The church was dedicated by Bishop Patrick Barry on January 30, 1927.

St. Margaret Mary opened St. Margaret Mary School in the fall of 1954. Bishop Joseph Patrick Hurley, of St. Augustine dedicated the school in 1960.

The current chapel was erected in 1983 and blessed by Bishop Thomas Joseph Grady in November of the same year.

For years, the church has participated in local fundraisers and charities.

=== Pastors ===
1. Reverend Daniel Hegarty 1947–1958
2. Father John Lawler 1958–?
3. Monsignor Richard Walsh 1985–present
