= Robert Bruce Barbour House =

- Casa Feliz Historic Home
- U.S. National Register of Historic Places
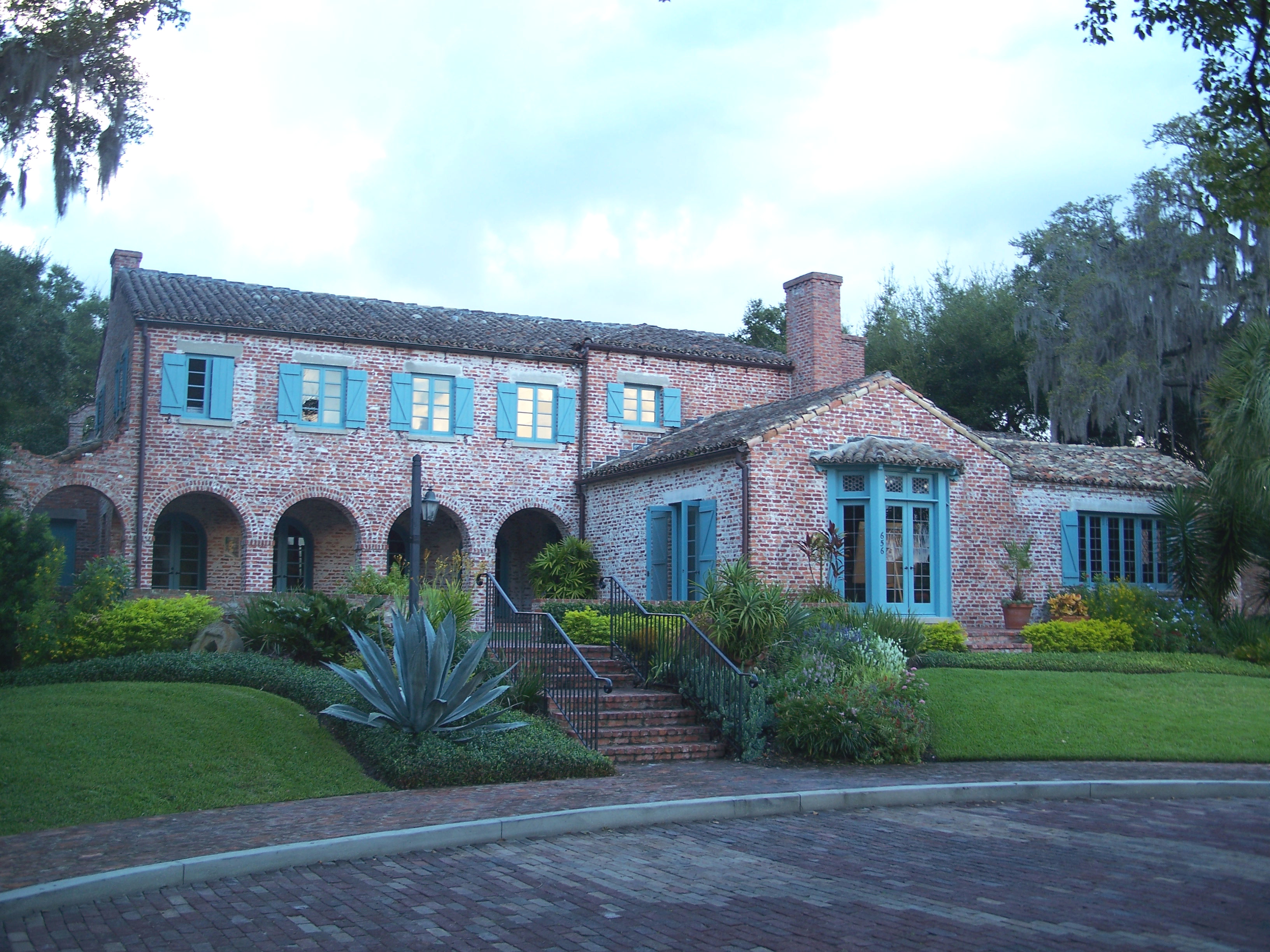

- Location within Florida Location within the United States
- Interactive map showing the location of Casa Feliz Historic Home
- Location: Winter Park, Florida, USA
- Coordinates: 28°36′9.6″N 81°21′3.8″W
- Built: 1932
- Architect: James Gamble Rogers II
- NRHP reference No.: 08001244
- Added to NRHP: December 31, 2008

The Robert Bruce Barbour House, also known as Casa Feliz (Happy House) is a restored Spanish farmhouse designed by architect James Gamble Rogers II, overlooking the golf course in the heart of Winter Park, Florida. On December 31, 2008, it was added to the United States National Register of Historic Places.

== History ==
In 1932, Robert Barbour, who owned a company that manufactured chemical dyes, asked James Rogers to design him a home. The house was completed in 1933. The Barbour family frequently hosted community events at their house, including the Spanish Institute of Florida's annual party, giving it the name Casa Feliz in the 1960s. In 1951, the Barbour family sold the property and in 2000, the City of Winter Park acquired the building.

== Design ==
Rogers created a gracious residence, with large public rooms. The living room opens to a garden on one side and a courtyard on the other; the dining room also opens to this courtyard. Along the garden front is an arched loggia that connects the living room, entrance hall and library. The home also features an arched porte cochere.

The interior of "Casa Feliz" is refurbished to its original condition. The living room has a vaulted ceiling with massive hand-hewn beams. The public spaces of the house are the living and dining rooms, library, courtyards and detached garden room (formerly the garage). Typical James Gamble Rogers II details include the majolica-tiled interior courtyard and fountain, arched doorways and a circular staircase.

The exterior of "Casa Feliz" and grounds feature original Spanish roof tiles and whitewashed bricks, a turret, a bell tower and a heavy timber balcony, lush landscaping, courtyards, oaks and native plants contained by clay amphoras.

== Recent history ==
Originally the house stood at 656 North Interlachen Avenue bordering one of Winter Park's lakes with the garden front of the house facing the lake. It stood there for about seventy years. In 2000, the then-owner began to demolish the house. The City of Winter Park acquired the house and relocated it 900 feet to city-owned property.

== Casa Feliz Historic House Museum ==
The Casa Feliz historic house museum has a permanent exhibit that focuses on the life and works of architect James Gamble Rogers II. The estate has been restored to reflect its original 1930s appearance and serves as a Winter Park and Orlando wedding venue.
