= Lake Osceola =

Lake in the state of Florida, United States

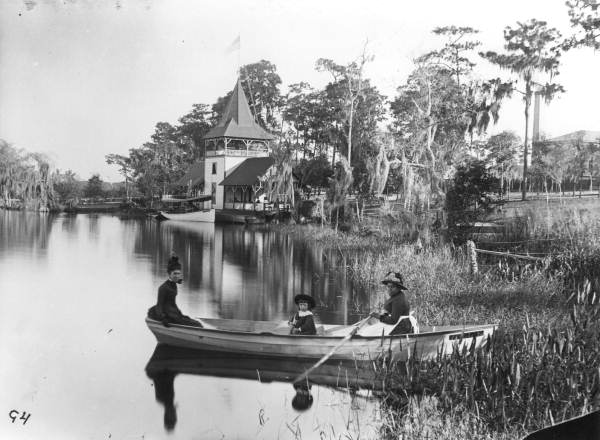
- Women with child in rowboat on Lake Osceola, Winter Park, Florida, 1880s

- Location within Florida Location within the United States
- Location: Winter Park, Florida
- Coordinates: 28°36′09″N 81°20′31″W
- Type: natural freshwater lake
- Basin countries: United States
- Max. length: northern section 2,860 ft (870 m) southern section 2,360 ft (720 m)
- Max. width: northern section 2,030 ft (620 m) southern section 1,415 ft (431 m)
- Surface area: 156 acres (63 ha)
- Average depth: 14 ft (4.3 m)
- Surface elevation: 66.5 ft (20.3 m)
- Settlements: Winter Park, Florida

Lake Osceola is a lake in Winter Park, Orange County, Florida, United States. It is part of the Orlando–Kissimmee–Sanford, Florida Metropolitan Statistical Area.

Lake Osceola was named after the Seminole leader Osceola.
