= List of neighborhoods in Orlando, Florida =

The following neighborhoods exist within the city limits of Orlando, Florida.

== Official neighborhoods ==
Orlando has defined the following neighborhoods to cover the entire area of the city.

Name	Annexed	Notes
33rd Street Industrial	1968	
Airport North	1981	
Audubon Park	1951, 1953	
Azalea Park	1954	only partly within Orlando
Bal Bay	1998	
Baldwin Park	1947	former Naval Training Center Orlando
Bel Air	1955–1959	
Beltway Commerce Center	2007, 2010	
Boggy Creek	1987, 1988	
Bryn Mawr	1981	
Callahan	1875	
Camellia Gardens	2001	only partly within Orlando
Carver Shores	1968–1971	
Catalina	1957, 1958	
Central Business District	1875	includes the Downtown Historic District (locally defined)
City of Orlando/GOAA	1994	vacant land south of Orlando International Airport
Clear Lake	1955–1963	
College Park	1923 or 1925	includes the Lake Adair-Lake Concord Historic District and Lake Ivanhoe Historic Residential District (nationally defined)
Colonial Town Center	1957	
Colonialtown North	1923 or 1925	
Colonialtown South	1923 or 1925	local historic district
Conway	1964–1973	only partly within Orlando
Countryside	1973	
Coytown	1955, 1956	
Crescent Park	1993	
Delaney Park	1911	
Dixie Belle	1973, 1974	
Dover Estates	1964, 1972	
Dover Manor	1972	
Dover Shores East	1958–1974	
Dover Shores West	1955–1958	
Eagles Nest	1971	
East Central Park	1953, 1957	
East Park	1994	
Education Village	1999, 2003	formerly named Narcoossee Groves
Engelwood Park	1954–1974	
Florida Center	1968–1973	includes International Drive
Florida Center North	1968	
Haralson Estates	1999, 2000	
Hibiscus	1971–1973	
Holden Heights	1911	only partly within Orlando
Holden/Parramore	1875	national historic district; includes separate Griffin Park Historic District
Johnson Village	1947	
Kirkman North	1981–1986	
Kirkman South	1968–1972	
Lake Cherokee	1875	local historic district
Lake Como	1923 or 1925, 1953–1959	
Lake Copeland	1875, 1911	local historic district
Lake Davis/Greenwood	1875	
Lake Dot	1875	
Lake Eola Heights	1875	local and national historic district
Lake Fairview	1960, 2002	
Lake Formosa	1923 or 1925	
Lake Fredrica	1971, 1972, 1993	
Lake Holden	2002	
Lake Mann Estates	1961–1968	
Lake Mann Gardens	1970	
Lake Nona Central	1994, 1998	
Lake Nona Estates	1994	
Lake Nona South	1994, 1998	
Lake Richmond	1971	
Lake Shore Village	1986	
Lake Sunset	1955	
Lake Terrace	1971–1973, 1994	
Lake Underhill	1956–1964	
Lake Weldona	1875	
Lancaster Park	1923 or 1925	
LaVina	1994	
Lawsona/Fern Creek	1875, 1911	
Lorna Doone	1923 or 1925	
Malibu Groves	1966–1969	
Mariners Village	1985	
Mercy Drive	1964–1974, 2002–2003	
MetroWest	1983	
Millenia	1990, 2000–2001	
Monterey	1955, 1974	
Narcoossee South	2006	
New Malibu	1969, 1972	
North Orange	1923 or 1925	includes Rosemere Historic District (nationally defined)
NorthLake Park at Lake Nona	1994	
Orlando Executive Airport	1947	
Orlando International Airport	1982	
Orwin Manor	1923 or 1925	
Palomar	1955	
Park Central	2001	
Park Lake/Highland	1875, 1911	
Pershing	2002	
Pineloch	1962–1974	
Princeton/Silver Star	1961–1963, 1987–2006	
Randal Park	1994	
Richmond Estates	1968	
Richmond Heights	1961–1969	
Rio Grande Park	1961–1969	
Rock Lake	1923 or 1925	
Roosevelt Park	1966	
Rose Isle	2004	
Rosemont	1971, 1972	
Rosemont North	1972, 1979	
Rowena Gardens	1923 or 1925	
Seaboard Industrial	1965	
Signal Hill	1972	
South Division	1923 or 1925, 1957, 1960	
South Eola	1875	
South Orange	1875, 1911, 1923 or 1925, 1960, 2001–2002	
South Semoran	1972, 1973	
Southeastern Oaks	2013	
Southern Oaks	1968, 1969	
Southport	1988	former Naval Training Center Orlando McCoy Annex
Spring Lake	1923 or 1925, 1992	
Storey Park	2013	formerly named Wewahootee
Sunbridge	2024	community founded by Tavistock Group 2020
The Dovers	1973, 1974	
The Willows	1965	
Thornton Park	1875	
Timberleaf	1973	
North Quarter	1875, 1911	
Ventura	1973	
Vista East	1998	
Vista Park	2004	
Wadeview Park	1923 or 1925	
Washington Shores	1947	
Wedgewood Groves	1984	
West Colonial	1958, 2000	
Westfield	1923 or 1925	
Williamsburg	unknown	
Windhover	1968	

== Other neighborhoods ==
- Downtown Orlando includes all or most of Callahan, Central Business District, Holden/Parramore, Lake Dot, Lake Eola Heights, South Eola, and North Quarter*Downtown South includes most of South Division and South Orange and the western half of Pineloch
- Ivanhoe Village covers parts of Lake Formosa and North Orange
- Curry Ford West covers the Curry Ford corridor from Gaston Foster to Fern Creek.
- Lake Lawsona Historic District (locally defined) includes most of Lawsona/Fern Creek and Thornton Park
- Lake Nona includes Education Village, Lake Nona Central, Lake Nona Estates, Lake Nona South, and NorthLake Park at Lake Nona
- Mills 50 is centered on the intersection of Mills Avenue (SR 15) and Colonial Drive (SR 50), and includes parts of Colonialtown North/South, Rowena Gardens, Lake Eola Heights, and Park Lake/Highland
- Southeast Orlando (east of Orlando International Airport) includes City of Orlando/GOAA, East Park, Lake Nona, and Southeastern Oaks; Bal Bay, LaVina, Narcoossee South, Randal Park, and Storey Park are in the area but have not opted into the sector plan
- Traditional City (a zoning designation) includes Bel Air, College Park, Colonialtown North/South, Delaney Park, Downtown Orlando, East Central Park, Holden Heights, Lake Cherokee, Lake Como (part), Lake Copeland, Lake Davis/Greenwood, Lake Formosa, Lake Weldona, Lancaster Park, Lawsona/Fern Creek, North Orange, Orwin Manor, Park Lake/Highland, Rock Lake (part), Rowena Gardens, South Division, South Orange (part), Spring Lake (part), Thornton Park, and Wadeview Park
