= List of communities in Orange County, Florida =

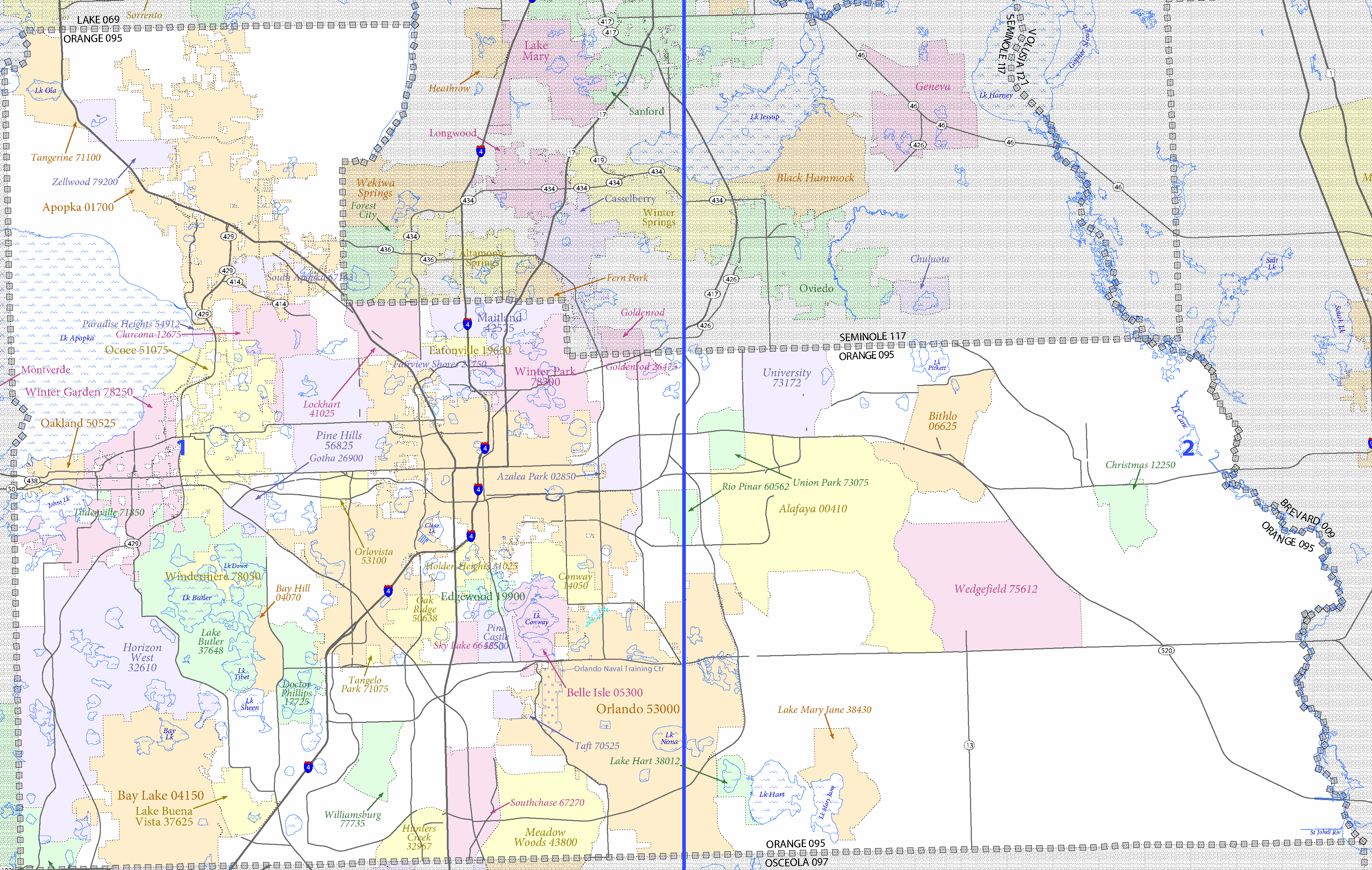
2010 U.S. Census tract map of Orange County

Communities in Orange County in the US state of Florida are all primarily located in the county's western half. It includes 12 municipalities (10 cities and 3 towns), 38 census-designated places, and 7 unincorporated places. The county seat is Orlando, which is also the most populous city.

== Municipalities ==
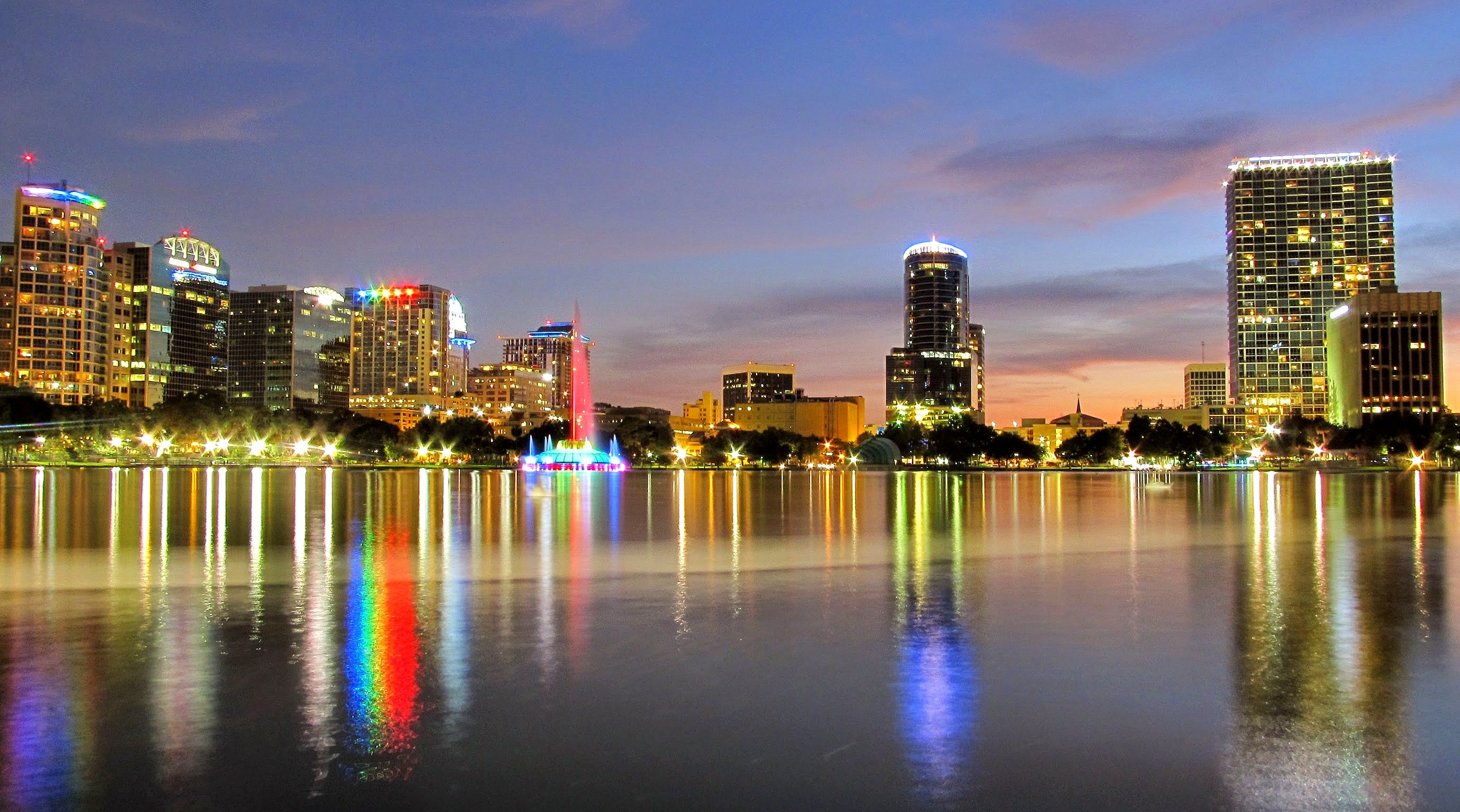
Skyline of Downtown Orlando as seen from Lake Eola

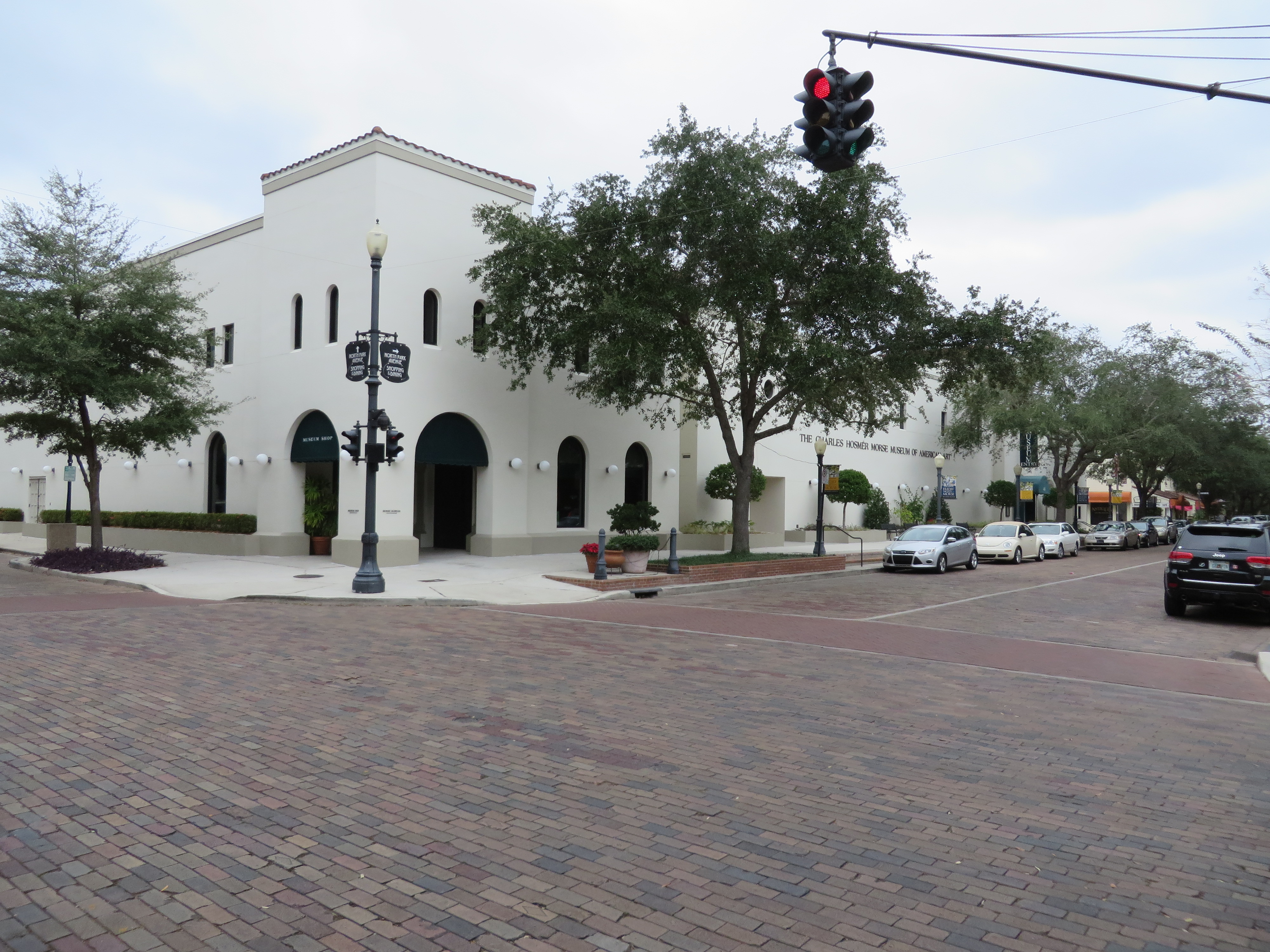
Winter Park

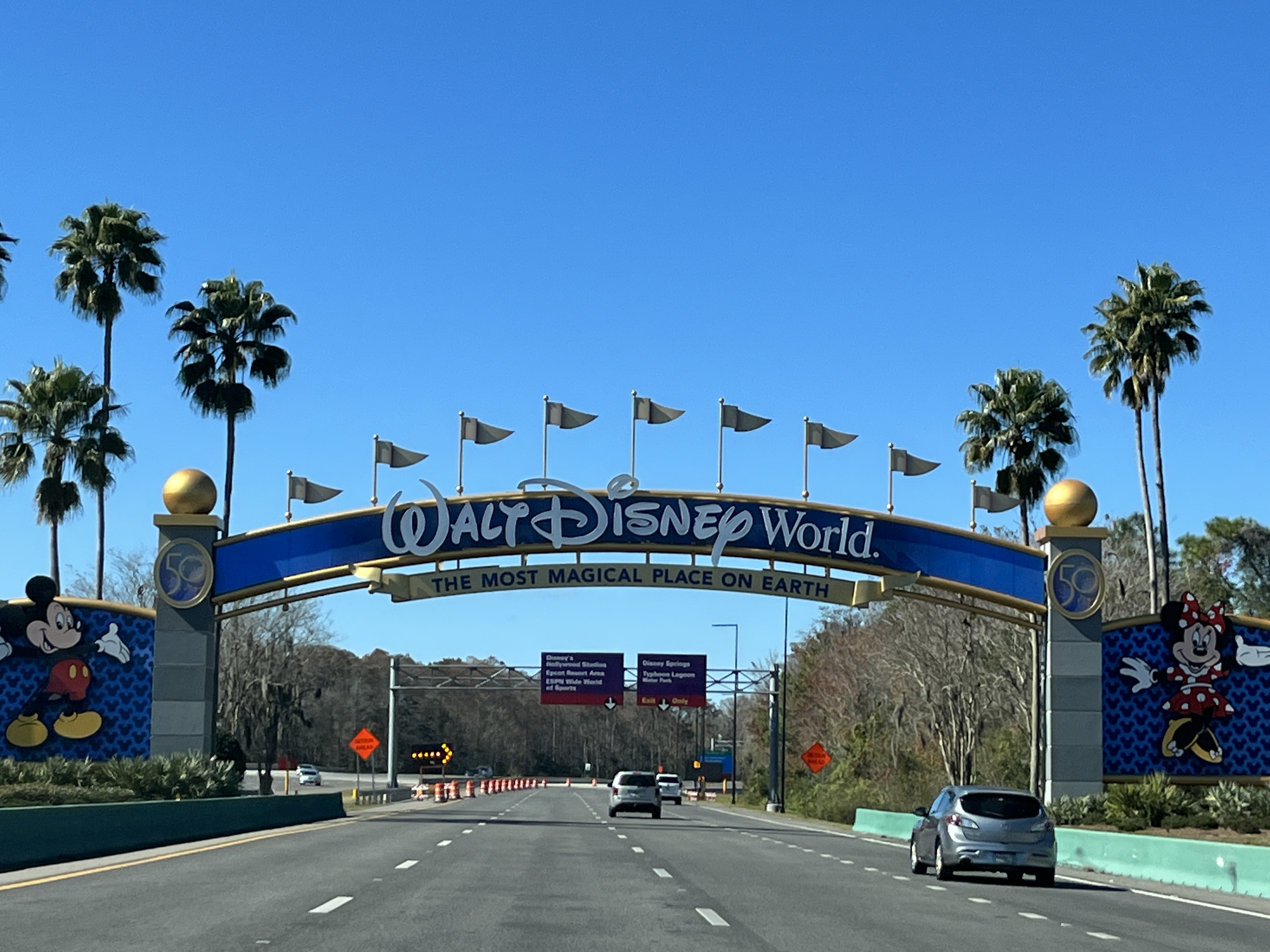
Walt Disney World

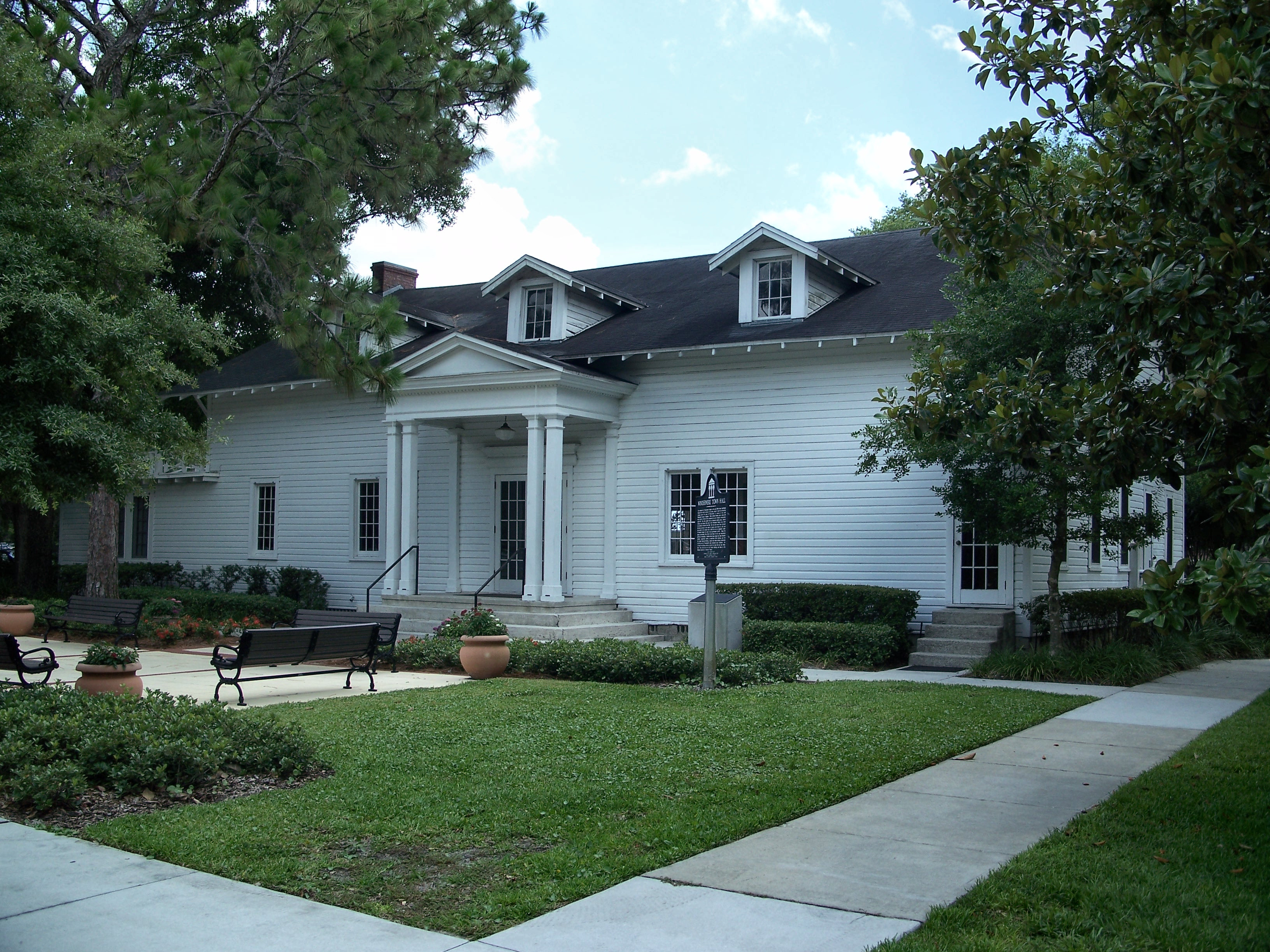
Windermere

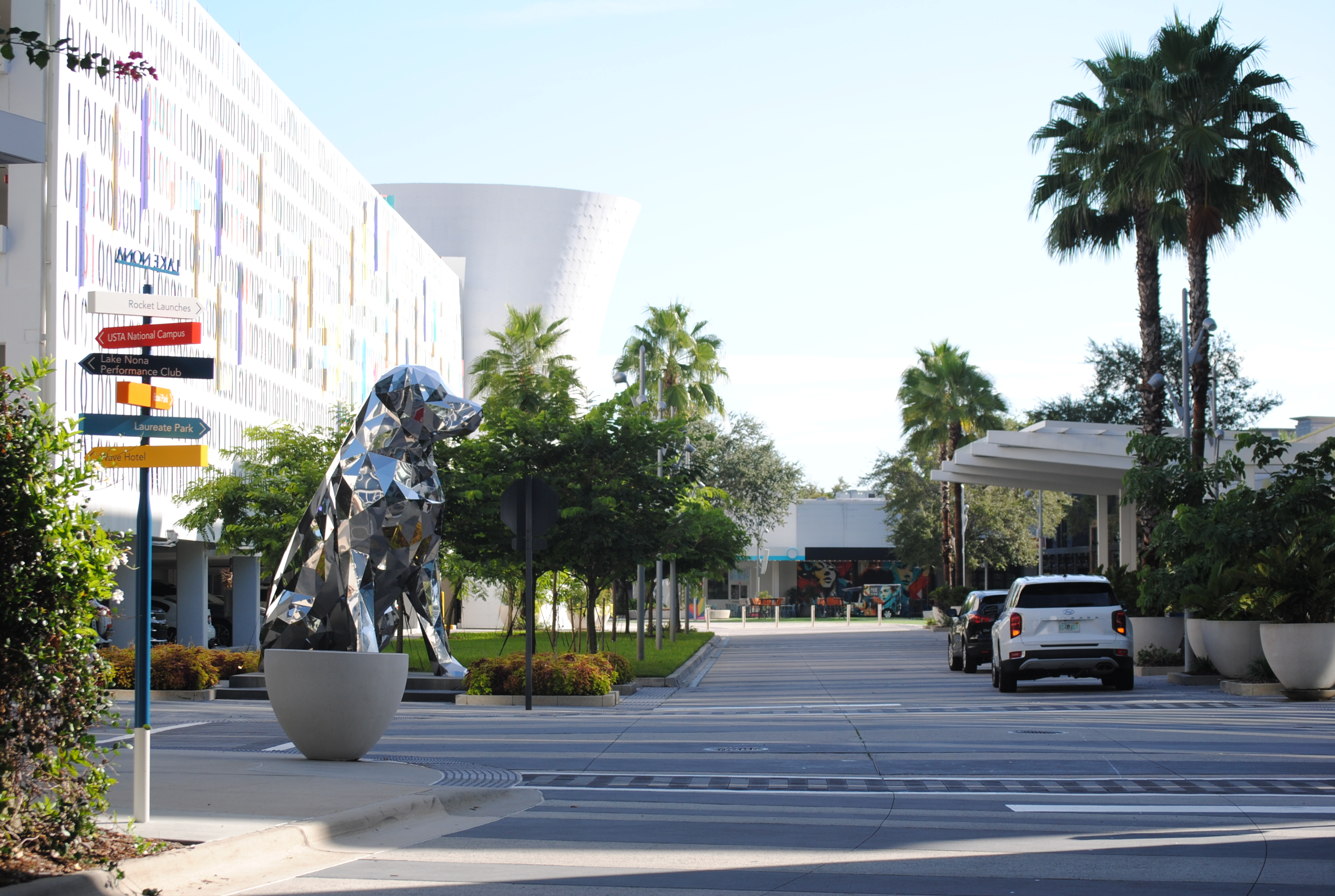
Lake Nona

Municipality populations are based on the 2020 US Census using their QuickFacts with 5,000 residents and above, while municipalities under 5,000 people are based on their US Decennial Census. These include:

#	Incorporated Community	Designation	Date incorporated	Population
1	Apopka	City	1919	54,904
2	Bay Lake	City	1967	29
3	Belle Isle	City	1954	7,032
4	Edgewood	City	1973	2,685
5	Lake Buena Vista	City	1969	24
6	Maitland	City	1959	19,543
7	Ocoee	City	1925	47,295
8	Orlando	City	1885	307,573
9	Winter Garden	City	1908	46,964
10	Winter Park	City	1925	29,795
11	Eatonville	Town	1 1887	2,349
12	Oakland	Town	1887	3,516
13	Windermere	Town	1925	3,030

== Census-designated places ==
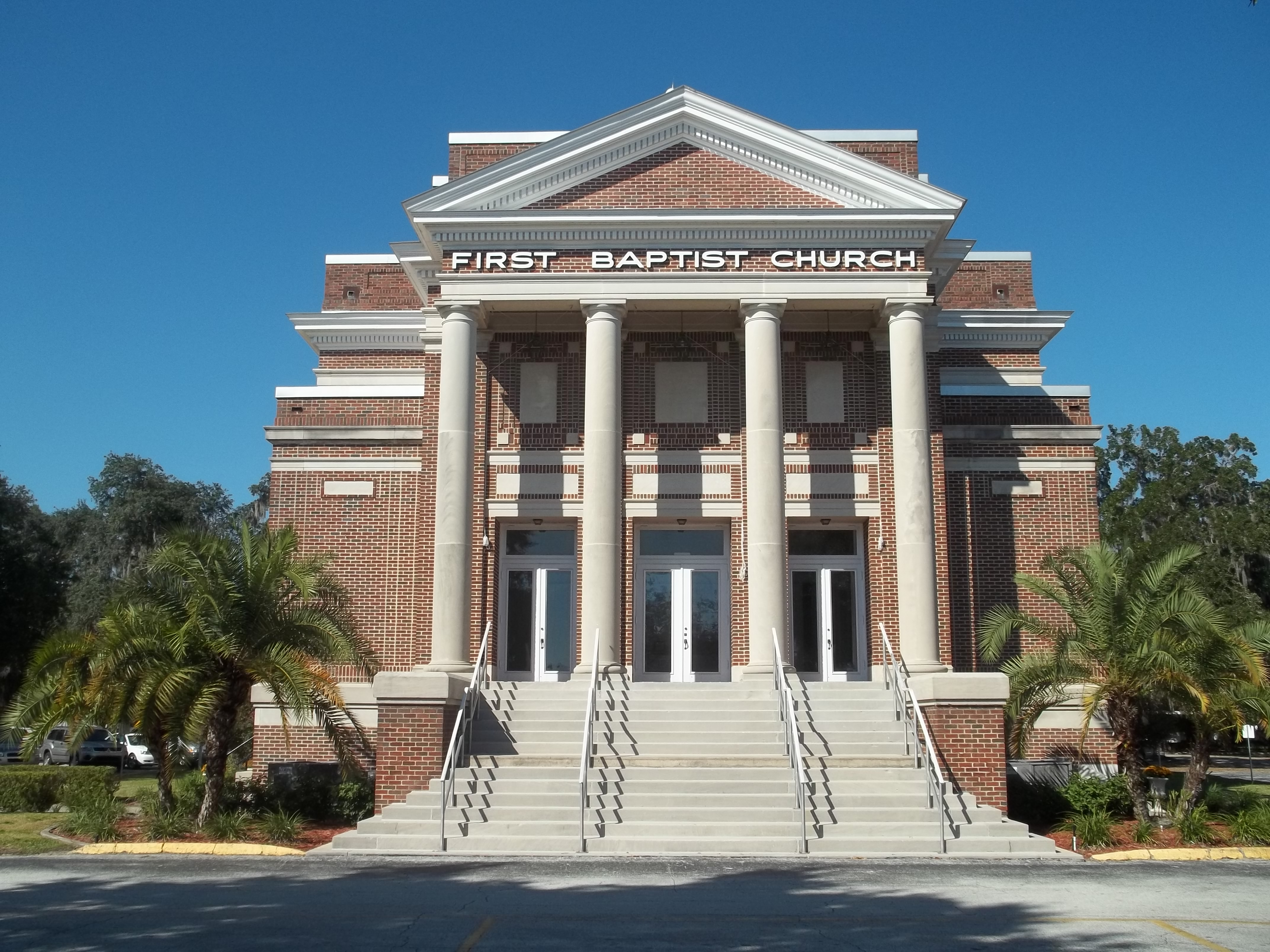
Winter Garden

As of the 2020 United States Census, there are 38 census-designated places in Orange County. The populations listed below are based on that census. These include:

#	Census-designated place	Population
a	Alafaya	92,452
b	Azalea Park	14,141
c	Bay Hill	5,021
d	Bithlo	9,848
e	Christmas	2,439
f	Clarcona	3,283
g	Conway	13,596
h	Dr. Phillips	12,328
i	Fairview Shores	10,722
j	Four Corners	56,381
k	Goldenrod	13,431
l	Gotha	2,213
m	Holden Heights	4,097
n	Horizon West	58,101
o	Hunter's Creek	24,433
p	Lake Butler	18,851
q	Lake Hart	1,052
r	Lake Mary Jane	1,790
s	Lockhart	14,058
t	Meadow Woods	43,790
u	Oak Ridge	25,062
v	Orlo Vista	6,806
w	Paradise Heights	1,215
x	Pine Castle	11,122
y	Pine Hills	66,111
z	Rio Pinar	5,409
aa	Sky Lake	7,226
bb	South Apopka	6,803
cc	Southchase	16,276
dd	Taft	2,221
ee	Tangelo	2,459
ff	Tangerine	3,237
hh	Tildenville	475
ii	Union Park	10,452
jj	University	45,284
kk	Wedgefield	8,017
ll	Williamsburg	7,908
ll	Zellwood	2,758

== Other unincorporated communities ==
The boundaries of these communities are loose and may overlap with each other as well as with the census-designated places. These include:

- Andover Lakes
- Chinatown
- Fairvilla
- Killarney
- Plymouth
- Reedy Creek Improvement District
- Vineland

== City districts and neighborhoods ==
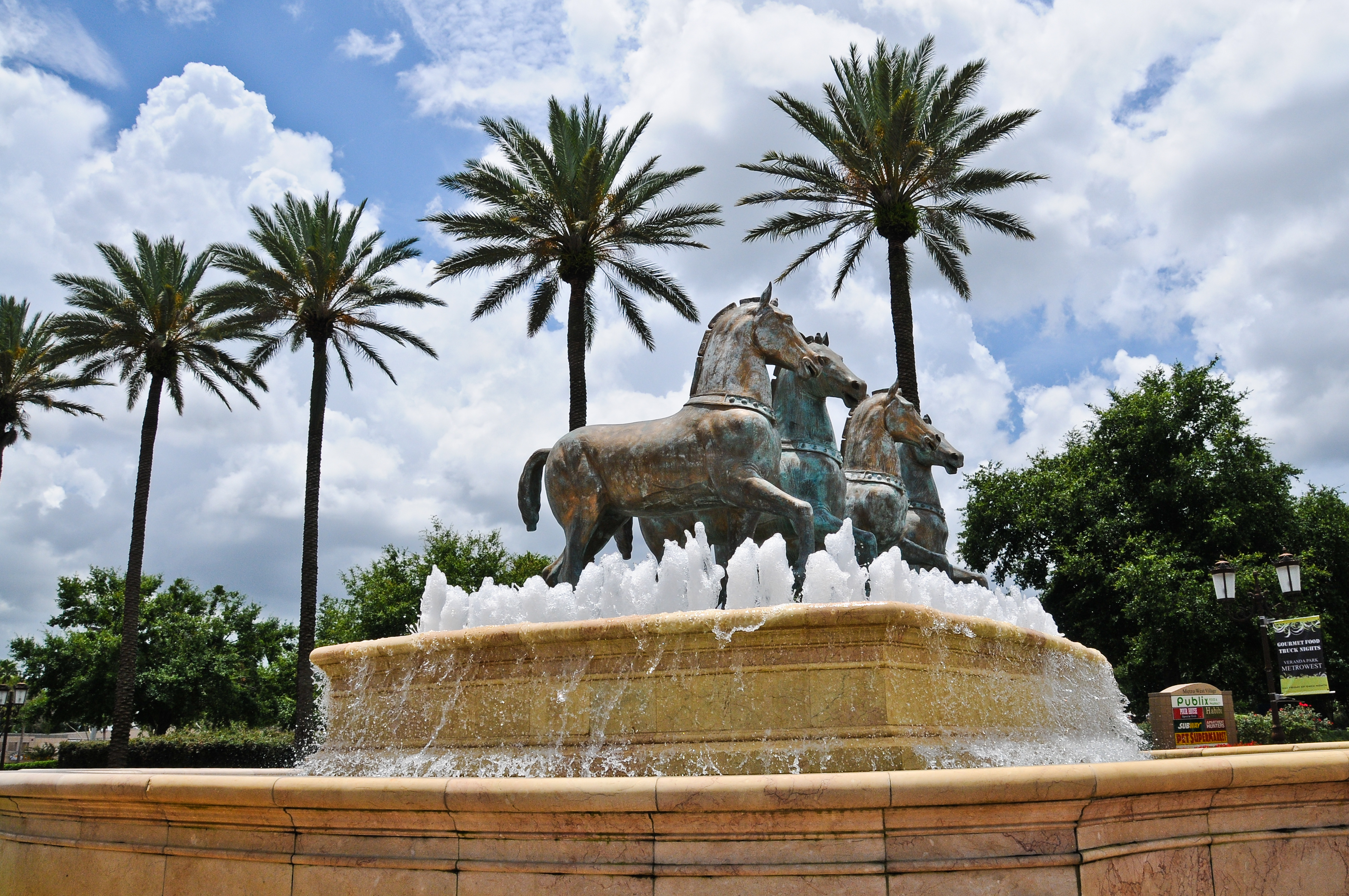
MetroWest

District / neighborhood	Municipality
Baldwin Park	Orlando
College Park	Orlando
Delaney Park	Orlando
Lake Eola Heights	Downtown Orlando
Lake Nona	Orlando
MetroWest	Orlando
Mills 50	Orlando

== See also ==
- List of neighborhoods in Orlando, Florida
- Greater Orlando
- Category:Cities in Orange County, Florida
- Category:Towns in Orange County, Florida
- Category:Census-designated places in Orange County, Florida
- Category:Unincorporated communities in Orange County, Florida
- Category:Neighborhoods in Orlando, Florida
