= Andover Lakes, Florida =

Neighborhood in Orlando, Florida, United States

Coordinates: 28.509°N 81.231°W

Andover Lakes, located east of Orlando, Florida, has around 2-300 residents in the neighborhoods.

== Amenities ==
Restaurants include McDonald's, Ferrera's Pizza, and, Tasty China. Stores include Publix, Pinch-a-penny, Dance Force Studio.

== Area schools ==
Cypress Springs Elementary School is also an "A" school with 793 Students. Principal Ruthie Haniff.

== Zoned schools ==
Odyssey Middle School is one of two middle schools for Andover Elementary and Cypress Springs Elementary with 1,658 students. Principal Patricia J. Bowen-Painter.

Legacy Middle School is the second middle school usually for Cypress Springs students with 962 students. Principal Wesley Trimble.

Only one high school serves the Andover Lakes area, which is University High School with 3,479 students. Principal Thomas Ott.
