= Mills 50 (Orlando) =

Prominent District in Orlando, Florida

Mills 50, Orlando Sài Gòn nhỏ
- Neighborhood of Orlando
- Interactive map of Mills 50, Orlando; Sài Gòn nhỏ
- Coordinates: 28.553177354240308°N 81.36440737345919°W
- Country: United States
- State: Florida
- City: Orlando

Orlando's Mills 50 is a neighborhood directly north of the adjacent downtown core. The district's name comes from the intersection of Mills Avenue and State Road 50 (Colonial Drive), the district is also known as Little Saigon or Little Vietnam. Mills 50 is known for its Vietnamese influence however other Asian cultures are also represented as well. The district has a wide range of authentic Asian-owned eateries and other businesses.

Mills 50 is a part of the Main Streets America program, a non-profit that promotes the district. Many locals argue that the Main Streets program hasn't done enough to promote or protect the area's ethnic identity.

== History ==
Refugees fleeing the Vietnam War settled in Orlando in the 1970s, first-, second- and third-generation Vietnamese Americans shaped the district and were an integral part of its formation.

== Transportation ==
Lynx Bus Links 28 (E. Colonial DR/Azalea Park), 29 (E. Colonial DR/Goldenrod RD), and 125 (Silver Star RD) all go through Mills 50

Both links 28 and 29 pass through Orlando's Fashion Square Mall and Lynx Central Station. Link 125 has a SunRail connection at AdventHealth station, 125 also goes to West Oak Malls and Edgewater DR/Princeton ST (College Park).
