= Rosemere Historic District =

Historic district in Florida, United States

- U.S. National Register of Historic Places
- U.S. Historic district
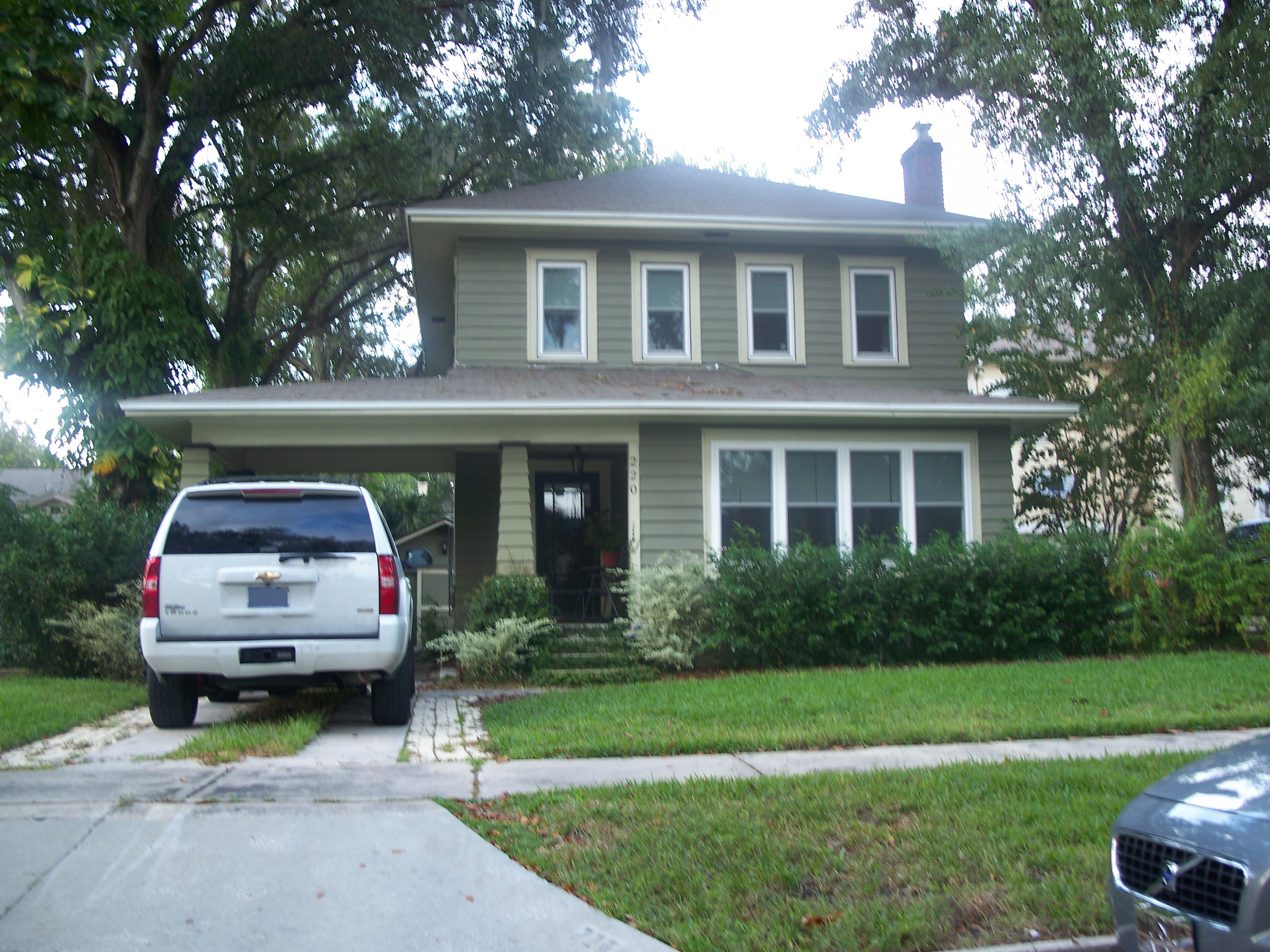
- House in the district

- Location within Florida Location within the United States
- Location: Orlando, Florida
- Coordinates: 28°34′10″N 81°22′26″W
- Built: 1918
- NRHP reference No.: 09000844
- Added to NRHP: October 21, 2009

The Rosemere Historic District is a U.S. historic district located to the west of Lake Formosa in Orlando, Florida. The district is roughly bounded by E. Harvard Street, N. Orange Avenue, Cornell Avenue, and E. Vanderbilt Street.

It was added to the National Register of Historic Places on October 21, 2009.
