= Sunbridge, Florida =

- Planned community
- Interactive map of Sunbridge, Florida
- Coordinates: 28°19′48″N 81°11′22″W
- Country: United States
- State: Florida
- County: Orange

Area
  - Total: 37.5 sq mi (97 km^{2})
- Time zone: UTC-5 (Eastern (EST))
  - Summer (DST): UTC-4 (EDT)
- Website: https://sunbridgefl.com/

Sunbridge is a master-planned community located in Central Florida, developed by Tavistock Development Company. The community, opened in 2020, encompasses more than 27,000 acres across both Orange County, Florida and Osceola County, Florida. Inspired by Lake Nona, Orlando, Florida, Sunbridge mixes residential, recreational, businesses and civic elements to foster connections to nature.

Sunbridge is located in Central Florida between metro Orlando and the Space Coast. It is approximately 20 minutes south of Orlando International Airport and 6 miles (10 km) from Tavistock's Lake Nona community. It is bordered by the Alligator Chain of Lakes to the east and Lake Tohopekaliga to the west. The community is located near major highways, including Florida's Turnpike and Florida State Road 417.

== History ==
Sunbridge is a development of the Tavistock Development Company and Suburban Land Reserve (SLR), a land development affiliate of Deseret Ranch.

SLR sought a partner to develop a portion of the former Deseret Ranch land, and Tavistock was selected. With the development of Sunbridge, Tavistock aimed to continue the sustainable stewardship demonstrated by SLR and Deseret Ranch, building upon the experiences from the development of Lake Nona.

== Sustainability and "Naturehood" ==
Sunbridge is designed with a focus on sustainability and preserving large stretches of Florida nature to give people access to oak forests, lakes, wetlands, and waterways while protecting the natural environment and preserving water quality

In the planning stages of Sunbridge, Tavistock partnered with representatives from the University of Florida, University of Central Florida, OUTSIDE Sustainable Landscape Collaborative, Cherrylake, Life Soils, Toho Water Authority, and other groups to execute the Sunbridge Stewardship Plan. The plan focuses on advancing strategies for water quality preservation, water resource conservation, renewable energy and efficiency, ecological preservation and community engagement. For example, the new community uses more drought tolerant and heat resilient native landscaping and is working to save and relocate some of the mature live oak trees on the property. Additionally, all of the new homes are pre-wired for solar panels, a power wall and electric vehicle plug-ins.

At the community's information center, called Basecamp, a demonstration garden was installed which acts as a living laboratory where research is conducted to identify the plant species that will thrive under different irrigation and soil conditions. The plots also provide an opportunity to sample arthropods and pollinators and compare what are more conventional plantings.

== Neighborhoods ==
Sunbridge includes a variety of residential options, including single-family homes, townhomes and villas by builders including Del Webb, Ashton Woods, Craft Homes, David Weekley Homes, Pulte Homes, and Toll Brothers. The homes incorporate sustainable living principles through energy efficiency, sustainable materials, improved design and construction.

Sunbridge is pedestrian-friendly, with a network of sidewalks and trails connecting homes to parks, schools, and natural areas. Neighborhoods include:

- Del Webb Sunbridge (55+ Active Adult Community)
- Weslyn Park

In 2025, Tavistock Development was approved to expand Sunbridge community with plans to have additional homes, office space, retail, and hotel rooms.
