= Lake Ivanhoe Historic Residential District =

Historic district in Florida, United States

- U.S. National Register of Historic Places
- U.S. Historic district
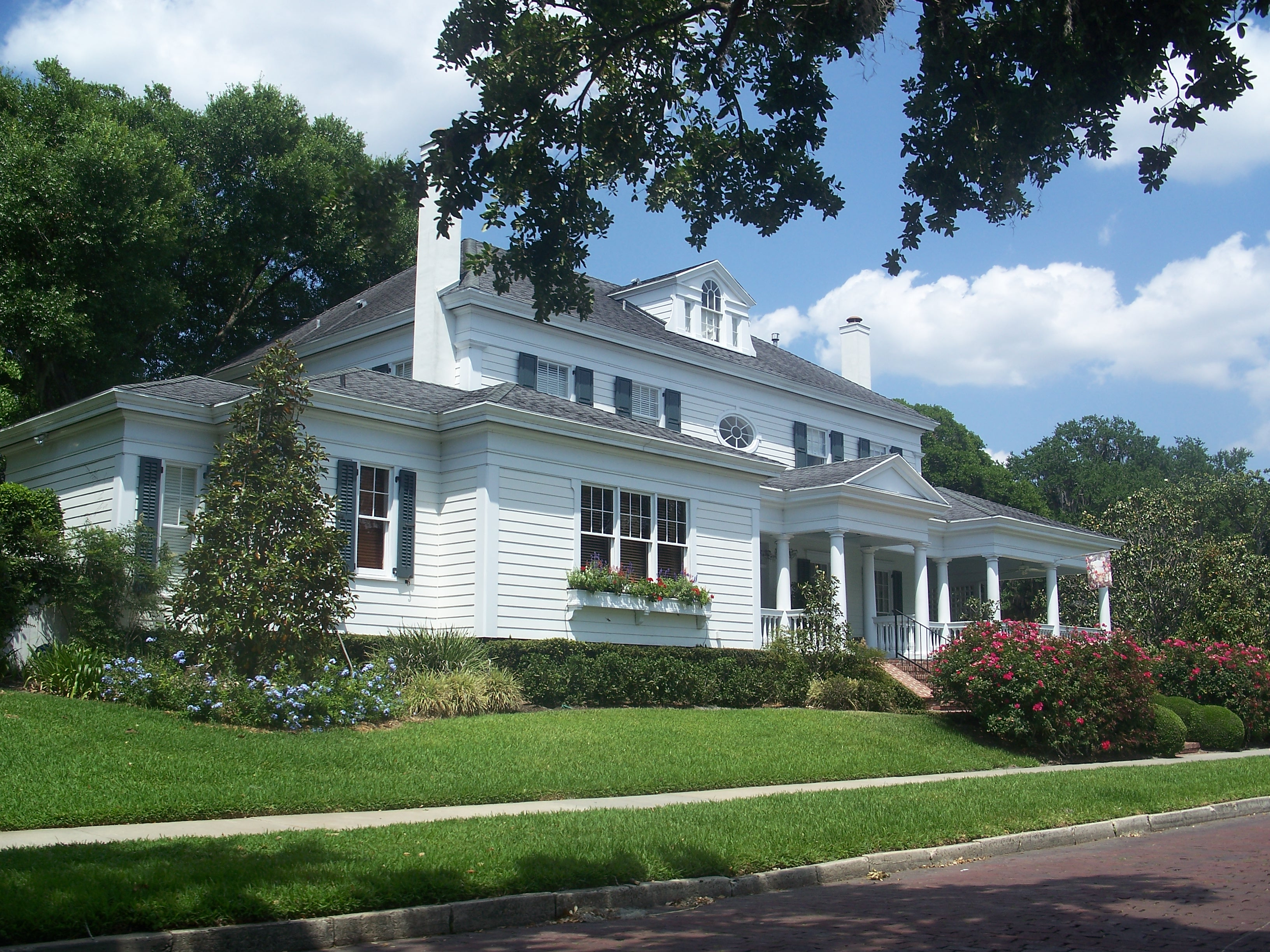
- House in the district

- Location within Florida Location within the United States
- Location: Orlando, Florida
- Coordinates: 28°34′01″N 81°22′55″W
- Built: 1920
- NRHP reference No.: 10001042
- Added to NRHP: December 20, 2010

The Lake Ivanhoe Historic Residential District is a U.S. historic district located around Lake Ivanhoe in Orlando, Florida. The district is roughly bounded by Orlando Street, Interstate 4, Lakeview Street, Edgewater Drive.

It was added to the National Register of Historic Places on December 20, 2010.
