= College Park (Orlando) =

Neighborhood in Orlando, Florida, US

Coordinates: 28.5686012°N 81.3894297°W

College Park, Orlando
- Neighborhood
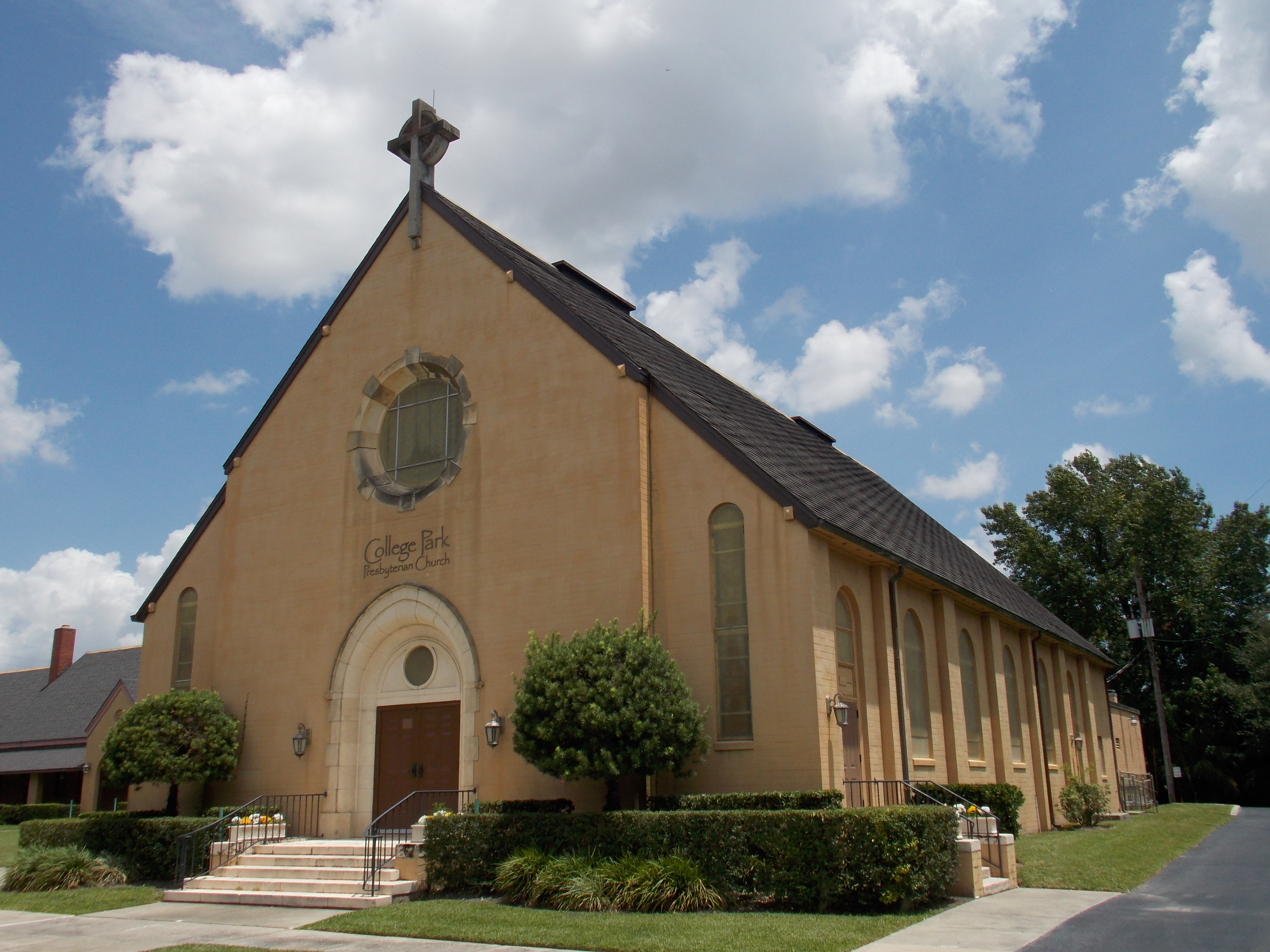
- College Park Presbyterian Church in College Park, Orlando
- Interactive map of College Park, Orlando
- Country: United States
- State: Florida
- County: Orange
- City: Orlando

College Park is a distinct neighborhood within the city of Orlando, Florida, deriving its name from the many streets within its bounds that were named for institutions of higher learning such as Princeton, Harvard, and Yale. Its close proximity to downtown has made it a popular residential area for over a century among seniors and young professionals. According to the 2000 census, most residents were of working age (between 18 and 49) and were homeowners. Of them, 65.5% of households had no children. As of the 2023 U.S. Census, the total population of College Park is 21,076 with a median age of 38.5. 78.5% of households have no children and the median household income is $113,466.

== History ==
Citrus grower John Ericsson built the first known home in College Park at 19 West Princeton, in the middle of what was then an 80-acre (320,000 m^{2}) grove. Other settlers soon followed, especially after the arrival of the South Florida Railroad in 1880, including: Adam Given, Mr. Grover, Marshall Porter, James Wilcox, Algernon Hayden, John W. Childress, and George Russell.

The Great Freeze during the winter of 1894-1895 halted growth in the neighborhood for over a decade.

New residents began arriving in large numbers during the real estate boom of the 1920s, when the City of Orlando expanded its northern boundary north to Par Street to include College Park. It was during this decade that many of the neighborhood's best-known subdivisions were platted, including:

- Walter Rose's Rosemere in 1921.
- H. Carl Dann's Dubsdread in 1923.
- J.P. Holbrook's Edgewater Heights in 1924.
- Frank L. Anderson's Anderson Park also in 1924.

The boom turned into a bust during the Great Depression of the 1930s, but savvy businessman Welborn C. Phillips began buying up many of the remaining vacant lots in College Park—particularly those west of Edgewater Drive—and was well-positioned for the post-World War II boom.

During the post-war years, the neighborhood was home both to astronaut John Young, who grew up in his parents' home at 815 West Princeton Street, and Beat Generation writer Jack Kerouac who lived at 1418 Clouser Avenue when his masterpiece On the Road was published as well as when he wrote the follow-up, The Dharma Bums. The house now operates as a non-profit called the Kerouac Project, a haven for up-and-coming writers. Not only is it a unique tribute to Kerouac, it established Orlando on the international literary map.

In the 1950s developer Demetree began developing Ardsley Manor along the western shore of Lake Silver. The neighborhood was designed with larger lots and homes than the traditional parts of College Park. Ardsley Manor is the area bound by Bryn Mawr, Maury Road, Rio Grande, and Lake Silver. Lake Silver is a 60-acre (240,000 m^{2}) lake with a private park/lake access for Ardsley Manor residents only, found along the southern shore off of Bryn Mawr.

== Institutions ==
=== Churches ===
- College Park Presbyterian Church (PCUSA), 218 East Par Street.
- Incarnation Catholic Church, 1515 Edgewater Drive.
- Central Christian Church, 250 Southwest Ivanhoe Boulevard.
- Church of Jesus Christ of Latter-day Saints, 45 East Par Street.
- College Park Baptist Church, 1914 Edgewater Drive, established in 1928 under the pastorate of Rev. Milton Bales.
- College Park United Methodist Church, 644 West Princeton Street.
- Grace Orlando, 3100 Edgewater Drive (meets at Edgewater High School).
- St. Charles Borromeo Catholic Church, 4005 Edgewater Drive, established in 1954.
- St. Michael's Episcopal Church, 2499 North Westmoreland Avenue, established in 1948.
- St. Paul's Presbyterian Church, 4917 Eli Street.

=== Civic ===
- College Park Neighborhood Association and its predecessor organizations have had the goal of preserving, protecting, and improving College Park since 1987. CPNA's major annual events include Sunday in the Park (spring), Historic Homes Tour (fall), and when relevant, candidate forums. Meetings are held monthly, unless otherwise posted, on the first Monday of every month at 7:00 p.m. at the College Park Community Center.
- College Park Rotary Club, established in 1986, sponsors the annual Taste of College Park Food and Wine Festival to benefit the Ronald McDonald Houses of Orlando among other charities. They also contribute significant scholarship funds to neighborhood schools.

=== Education ===
- Bishop Moore Catholic High School.
- College Park Middle School (formerly Robert E. Lee Middle School).
- Edgewater High School.
- Lake Silver Elementary.
- Princeton Elementary School (1926).
- St. Charles Borromeo Catholic School (Pre-K thru 8th Grade).
- St. Vincent's Academy (Anglican).
- Orlando Junior Academy (Pre-K thru 8th Grade, SDA).

== Parks and recreation ==
- Albert Park is a small pocket park distinguished by its white gazebo and central location within the neighborhood. The park serves as a hub for several of College Park's neighborhood events, such as an annual Easter egg hunt and political candidate forums.
- Ben Crosby Field, located adjacent to Princeton Park, is the home to the Orlando Babe Ruth youth baseball league. Built in 1950, Ben Crosby Field is an oak tree lined baseball field that has been a community landmark for generations.
- College Park Community Center and Pool, established in 2005, features a gymnasium, computer lab, and outdoor amenities such as a swimming pool, baseball field, and playground. A variety of fitness programs are also offered.
- Dartmouth Park, established in 1948, bounded by Dartmouth, New Hampshire, Westmoreland, and Edgewater Drive.
- Dubsdread Golf Course, established in 1924 at 549 West Par Street, was closed for renovations March 12, 2007 but reopened in the summer of 2008. Once home to the Orlando Open, it has played host to such legendary golfers as Tiger Woods, Sam Snead, Ben Hogan, and Claude Harmon.
- Guernsey Park features a small basketball court and playground.
- Mathews Park, located just south of East Par Street on Formosa Avenue, includes a baseball field and playground.
