= Griffin Park Historic District =

Historic district in Florida, United States

- U.S. National Register of Historic Places
- U.S. Historic district
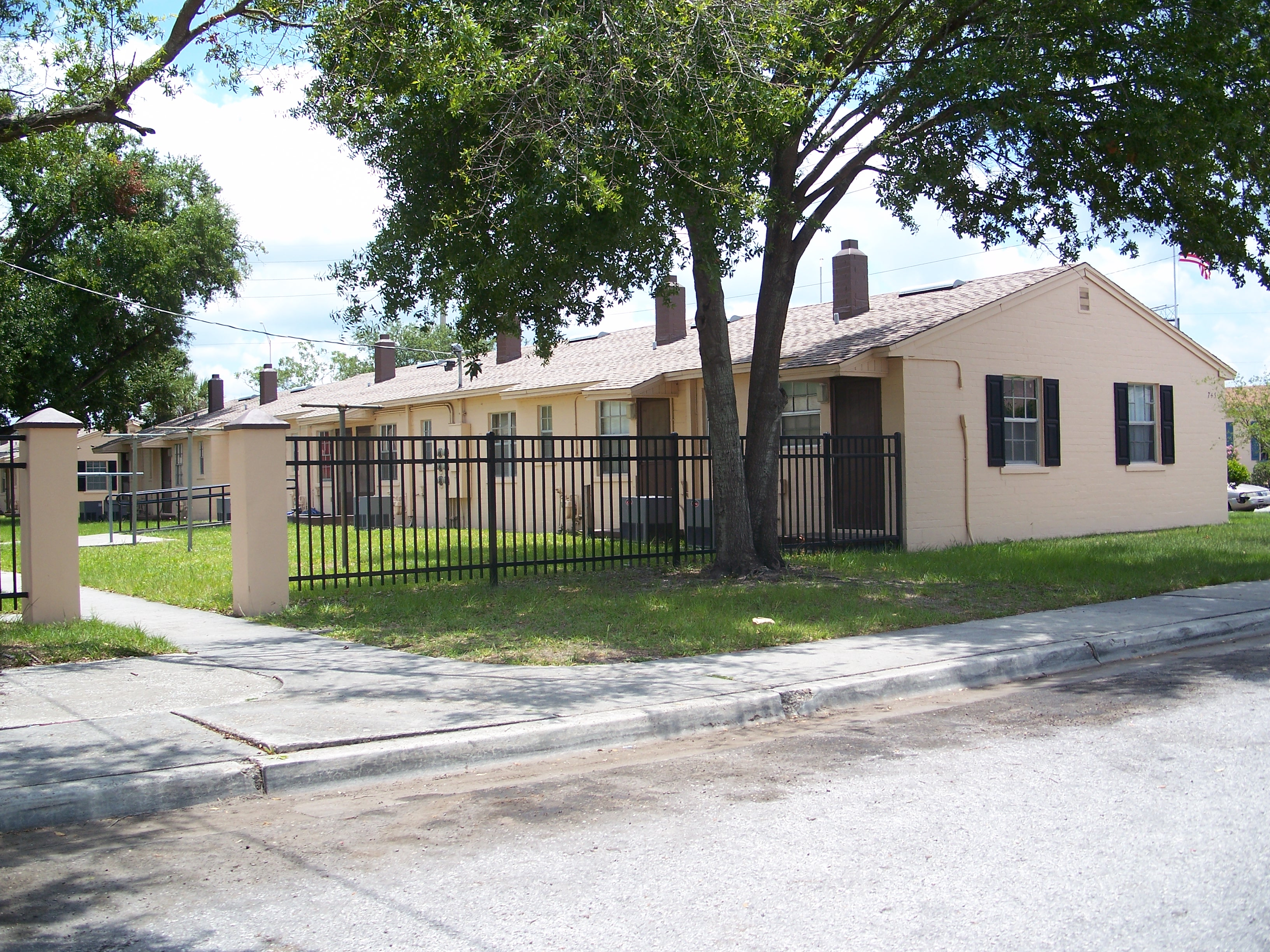
- Building in the district

- Location within Florida Location within the United States
- Location: Orlando, Florida
- Coordinates: 28°31′58″N 81°23′10″W
- Area: 158 acres (0.64 km^{2})
- Built: 1939; 87 years ago
- Architect: Arthur Beck
- NRHP reference No.: 96000784
- Added to NRHP: July 18, 1996; 30 years ago

The Griffin Park Historic District is a U.S. historic district (designated as such on July 18, 1996) located in Orlando, Florida. The district is bounded by Avondale and South Division Avenues, Carter Street, and I-4. It contains 26 historic buildings.
