= Lake Adair–Lake Concord Historic District =

Historic district in Florida, United States

- U.S. National Register of Historic Places
- U.S. Historic district
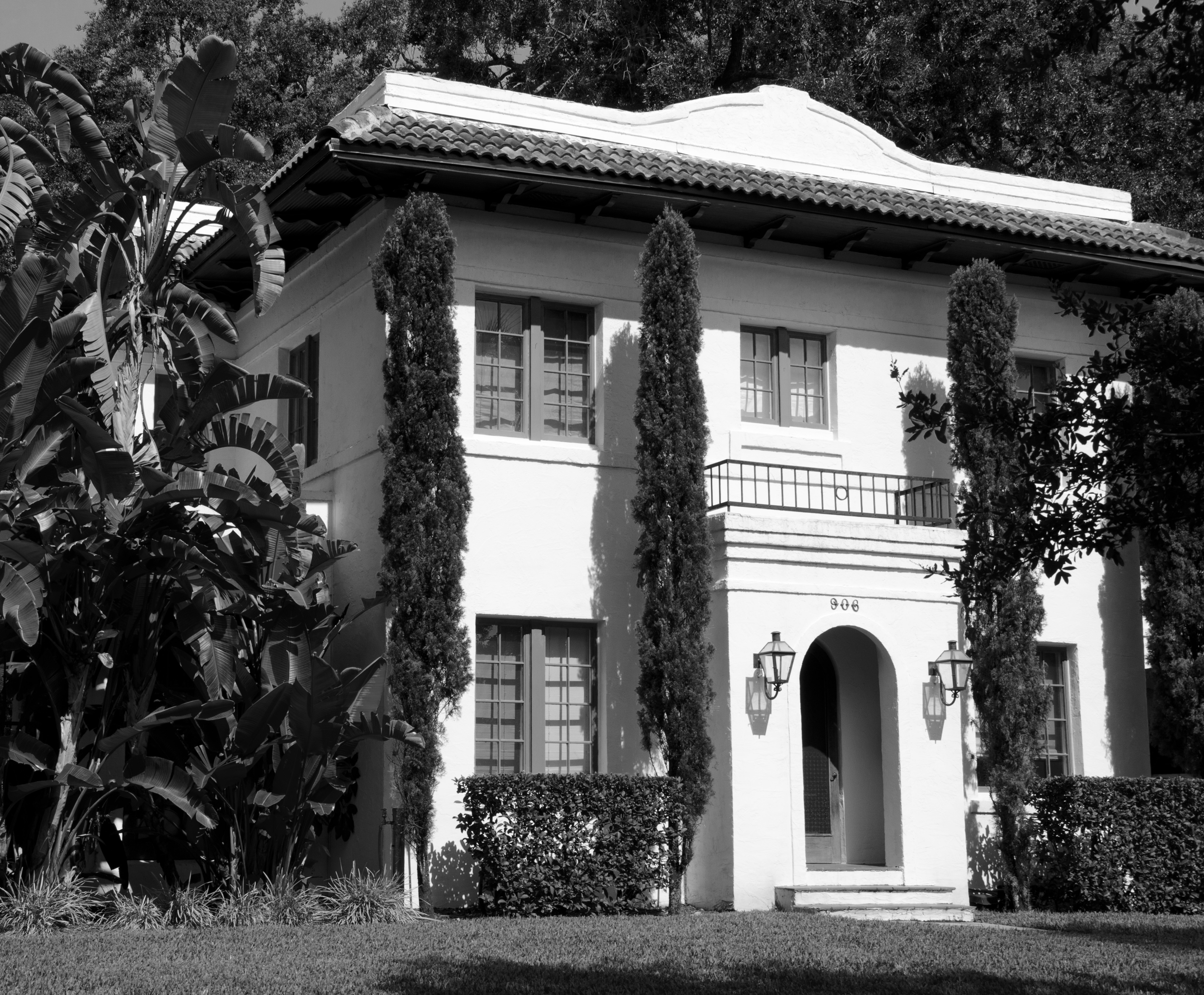
- House in Alhambra Ct

- Location within Florida Location within the United States
- Location: Orlando, Florida
- Coordinates: 28°33′23″N 81°23′28″W
- Built: 1910
- NRHP reference No.: 11000958
- Added to NRHP: December 30, 2011

The Lake Adair–Lake Concord Historic District is a U.S. historic district located to the east of Spring Lake including Overbrook Park and to the west of the Lake Adair and Lake Concord in Orlando, Florida. The district located in College Park is roughly bounded by Golfview Street, Edgewater Court, Alameda Street, and Peachtree Road.

It was added to the National Register of Historic Places on December 30, 2011.
