= Holden Heights, Florida =

Unincorporated area in Florida, US

- Census-designated place
- Location in Orange County and the state of Florida
- Coordinates: 28°31′11″N 81°23′58″W
- Country: United States
- State: Florida
- County: Orange

Area
  - Total: 1.42 sq mi (3.69 km^{2})
  - Land: 1.03 sq mi (2.66 km^{2})
  - Water: 0.40 sq mi (1.04 km^{2})
- Elevation: 108 ft (33 m)

Population (2020)
  - Total: 4,097
  - Density: 3,995.1/sq mi (1,542.51/km^{2})
- Time zone: UTC-5 (Eastern (EST))
  - Summer (DST): UTC-4 (EDT)
- FIPS code: 12-31025
- GNIS feature ID: 2402593

Holden Heights is a census-designated place and unincorporated area in Orange County, Florida, United States. As of the 2020 census, Holden Heights had a population of 4,097. The ZIP code serving the CDP is 32839. It is part of the Orlando–Kissimmee Metropolitan Statistical Area.

== Geography ==
Holden Heights is located approximately two miles SSW of Orlando.

According to the United States Census Bureau, the CDP has a total area of 1.5 square miles (3.8 km^{2}), of which 1.0 square mile (2.7 km^{2}) is land and 0.39 square miles (1.0 km^{2}) (26.79%) is water. The elevation of the CDP is 100 feet (30 m) above sea level.

== Demographics ==
Historical population
Census	Pop.	Note	%±
2020	4,097		—
U.S. Decennial Census

=== 2020 census ===
As of the 2020 census, Holden Heights had a population of 4,097. The median age was 45.8 years. 15.0% of residents were under the age of 18 and 20.8% of residents were 65 years of age or older. For every 100 females there were 107.8 males, and for every 100 females age 18 and over there were 107.7 males age 18 and over.

100.0% of residents lived in urban areas, while 0.0% lived in rural areas.

There were 1,510 households in Holden Heights, of which 22.2% had children under the age of 18 living in them. Of all households, 35.2% were married-couple households, 27.5% were households with a male householder and no spouse or partner present, and 25.3% were households with a female householder and no spouse or partner present. About 32.4% of all households were made up of individuals and 11.1% had someone living alone who was 65 years of age or older.

There were 1,584 housing units, of which 4.7% were vacant. The homeowner vacancy rate was 0.7% and the rental vacancy rate was 5.8%.

Racial composition as of the 2020 census
Race	Number	Percent
White	1,935	47.2%
Black or African American	1,141	27.8%
American Indian and Alaska Native	23	0.6%
Asian	103	2.5%
Native Hawaiian and Other Pacific Islander	4	0.1%
Some other race	338	8.2%
Two or more races	553	13.5%
Hispanic or Latino (of any race)	1,017	24.8%

=== Demographic estimates ===
The population was estimated at 3,479 in the 2022 American Community Survey.

=== 2000 census ===
As of the census of 2000, there were 3,856 people, 1,391 households, and 950 families residing in the CDP. The population density was 1,172.3 people/km^{2} (3,036 people/mi^{2}). There were 1,631 housing units at an average density of 495.9 units/km^{2} (1,284 units/mi^{2}). The racial makeup of the CDP was 72.77% White, 17.27% African American, 0.31% Native American, 2.62% Asian, 0.18% Pacific Islander, 4.02% from other races, and 2.83% from two or more races. Hispanic or Latino of any race were 14.68% of the population.

There were 1,391 households, out of which 26.8% had children under the age of 18 living with them, 49.7% were married couples living together, 12.9% had a female householder with no husband present, and 31.7% were non-families. 20.9% of all households were made up of individuals, and 6.1% had someone living alone who was 65 years of age or older. The average household size was 2.55 and the average family size was 2.91.

In the CDP, the population was spread out, with 19.7% under the age of 18, 6.5% from 18 to 24, 31.8% from 25 to 44, 24.0% from 45 to 64, and 18.0% who were 65 years of age or older. The median age was 40 years. For every 100 females, there were 101.7 males. For every 100 females age 18 and over, there were 99.8 males.

The median income for a household in the CDP was $46,950, and the median income for a family was $48,693. Males had a median income of $30,731 versus $28,707 for females. The per capita income for the CDP was $20,761. About 12.6% of families and 16.6% of the population were below the poverty line, including 28.3% of those under age 18 and 2.6% of those age 65 or over.

=== Population history ===
- 1970.....6,206
- 1980....13,864 (Z)
- 1990.....4,387
- 2000.....3,856
- 2010.....3,679

(Z): Parts of community annexed by Orlando in the 1980s.

Source: U.S. Census Bureau
