= MetroWest (Orlando) =

- Master-planned community
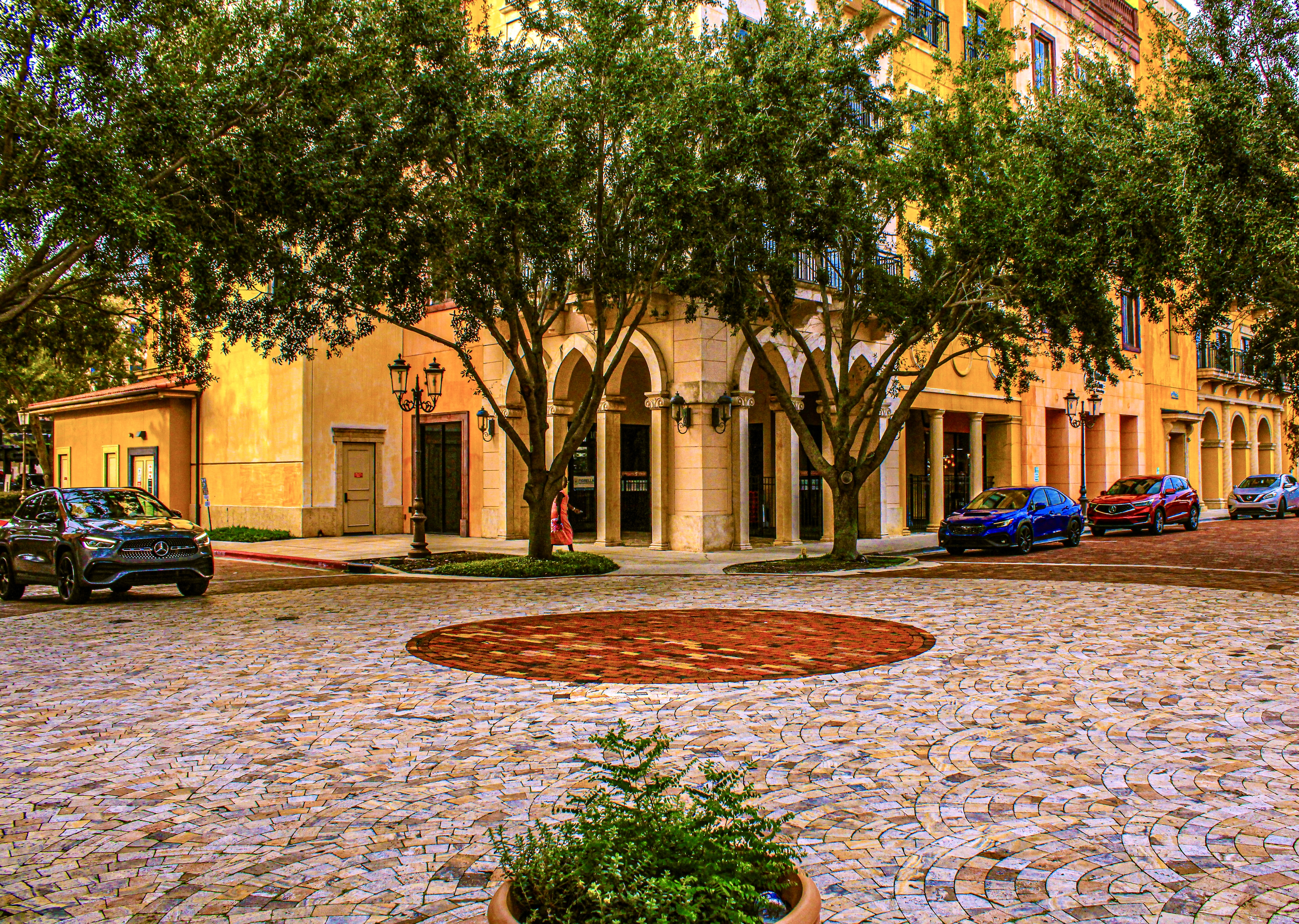

- Location within Florida
- Coordinates: 28°31′16″N 81°28′39″W
- Country: United States
- State: Florida
- County: Orange
- City: Orlando
- MetroWest Development: 1982
- Founder: Aaron Dowd
- Developer: Debra Inc.

Area
  - Total: 1,805 acres (730 ha)
- Elevation: 198 ft (60 m)
- Time zone: UTC-5 (Eastern (EST))
  - Summer (DST): UTC-4 (EDT)
- Zip code: 32835
- Area codes: 407 and 321
- Website: MetroWest Master Association

MetroWest is a 1,805-acre (730 ha) mixed-use master-planned community, situated in southwest Orlando, a city located in the central portion of the U.S. state of Florida. With its main entrance located on MetroWest Boulevard (off of Kirkman Road), the neighborhood is located 10 miles (16 km) southwest of Downtown Orlando, bordering the communities of Dr. Phillips and Windermere. The neighborhood is also in close proximity to Universal Orlando Resort, located 4 miles (6.4 km) away.

The neighborhood was developed in the 1980s by Debra, Inc., an Orlando-based developer, as a business, commercial and residential community- a place where people can live, work and play. It has over 9,600 residential homes as of 2013 (see Residential neighborhoods below). Housing options in the diverse community of Metrowest include a range of single-family homes with several apartment, townhome and condominium complexes spread over the gently rolling landscape.

MetroWest is managed by the MetroWest Master Association (MWMA), a corporation formed by Debra, Inc., which has the overall responsibility and right in maintaining the standards of all common areas located within the community. Past and future developments, projects and changes in MetroWest are first approved by the association's Design Review Board (DRB) following guidelines for quality and architecture that is harmonious to the present structures and topography. The landscaping and environment have won awards from the City of Orlando.

== Geography ==
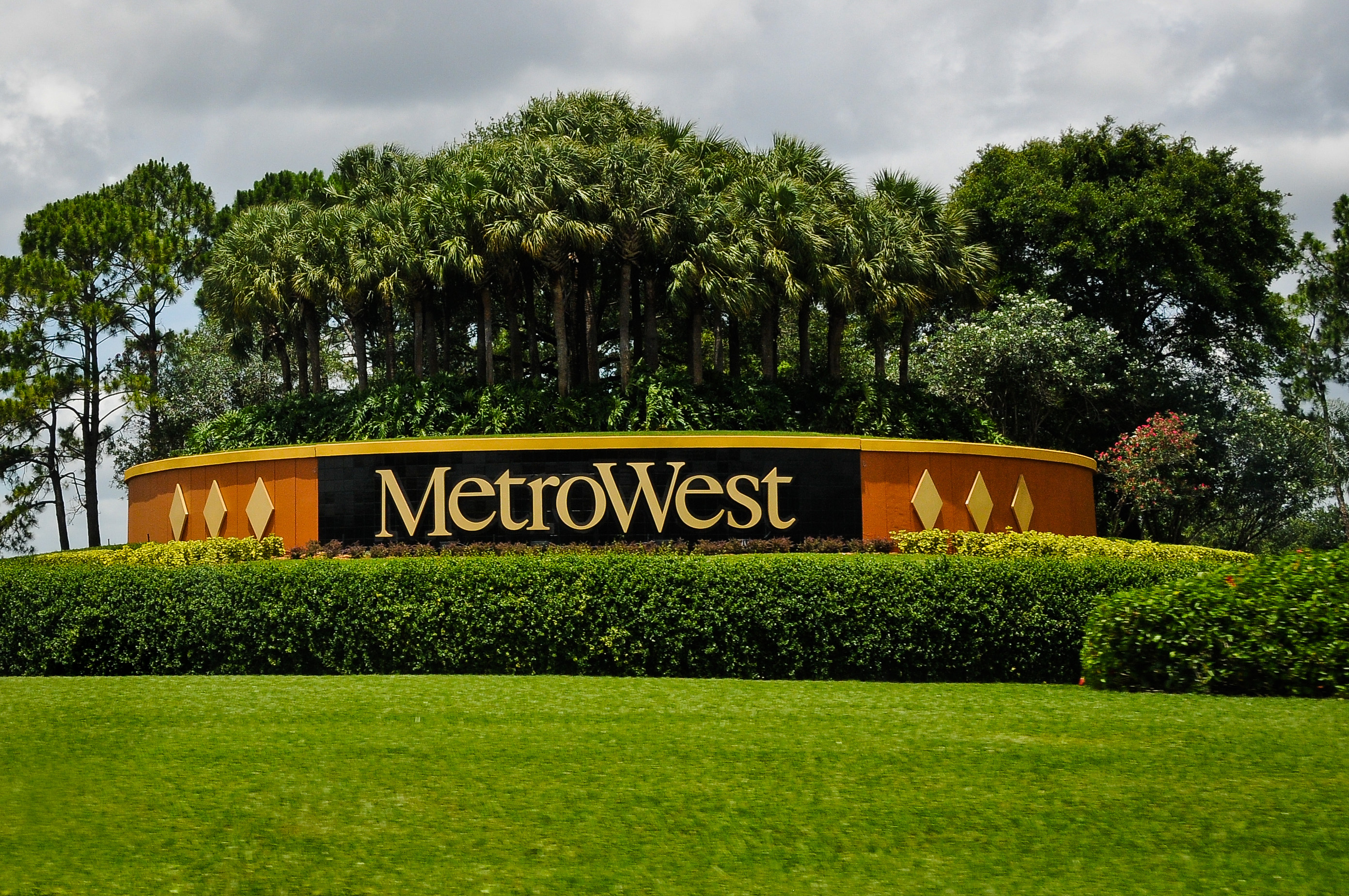
The main entrance to MetroWest

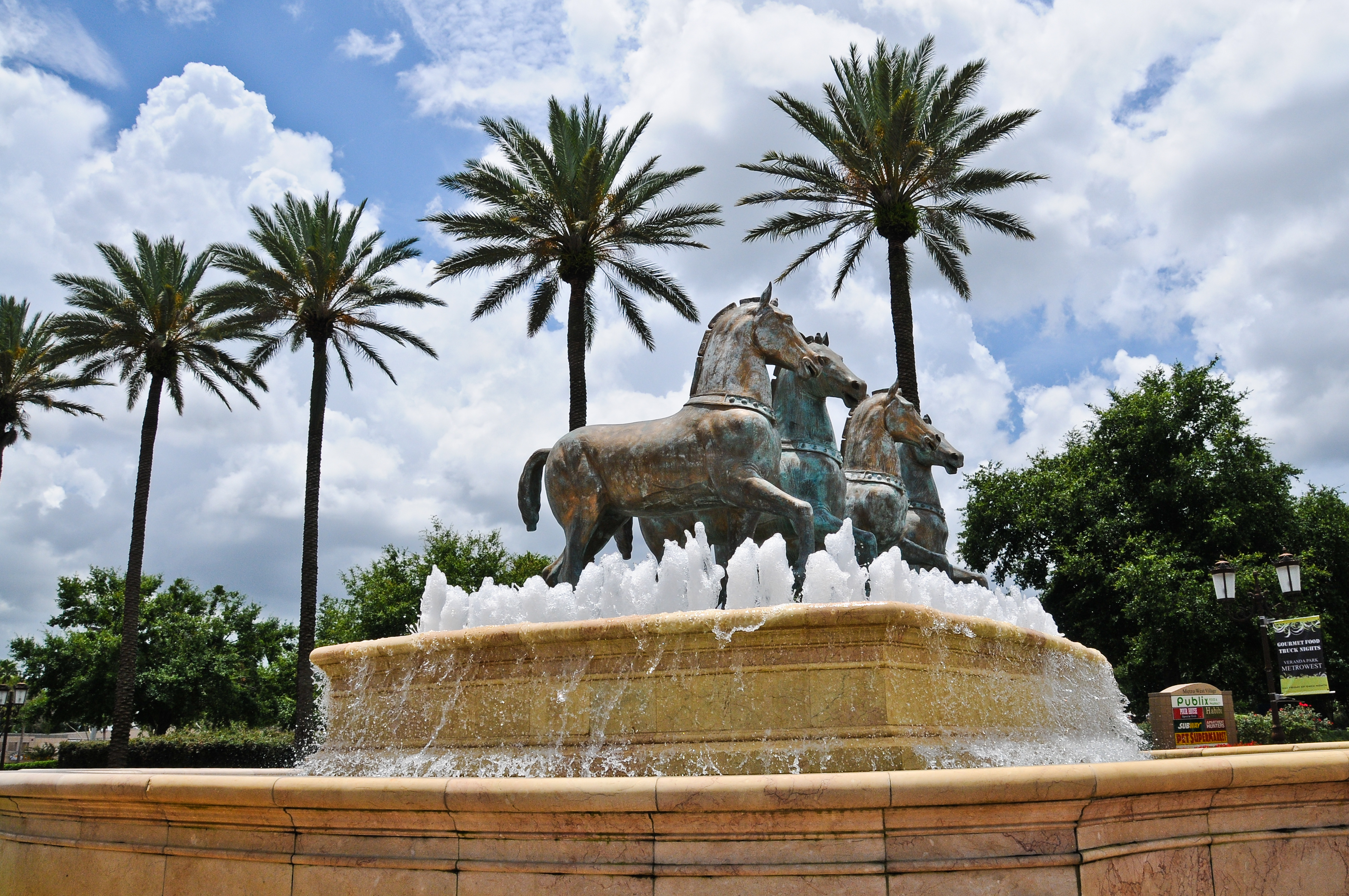
Replica of the Horses of Saint Mark in Venice, Italy at the entrance to MetroWest Village

The 1,805-acre (730 ha) mixed-use community is located in western Orlando. It is bounded by Kirkman Road to the east; by Turkey Lake to the southeast; by Pembrooke Pines development to the south; by the Florida's Turnpike to the southwest; Apopka-Vineland Road on its western tip; and to the north by Steer Lake Road, Edgewood Children's Ranch, Lake Hiawassee and Orlo Vista, Florida.

Bisecting the middle of the development, winding from north to south, is South Hiawassee Road, which also serves as the main entrance coming from the north and only entrance from the south. The other north entry point is through Lake Vilma Drive, off of Steer Lake Road. There are several entrances on the eastern side of the community, from north to south: Westgate Dr; Raleigh St; the north and south Valencia Community College Dr; north and south Metropolis Way; MetroWest Blvd, the main entrance of the community; and Arnold Palmer Drive. The main entrance of MetroWest is only 2.5 miles (4.0 km) north of Universal Studios Orlando.

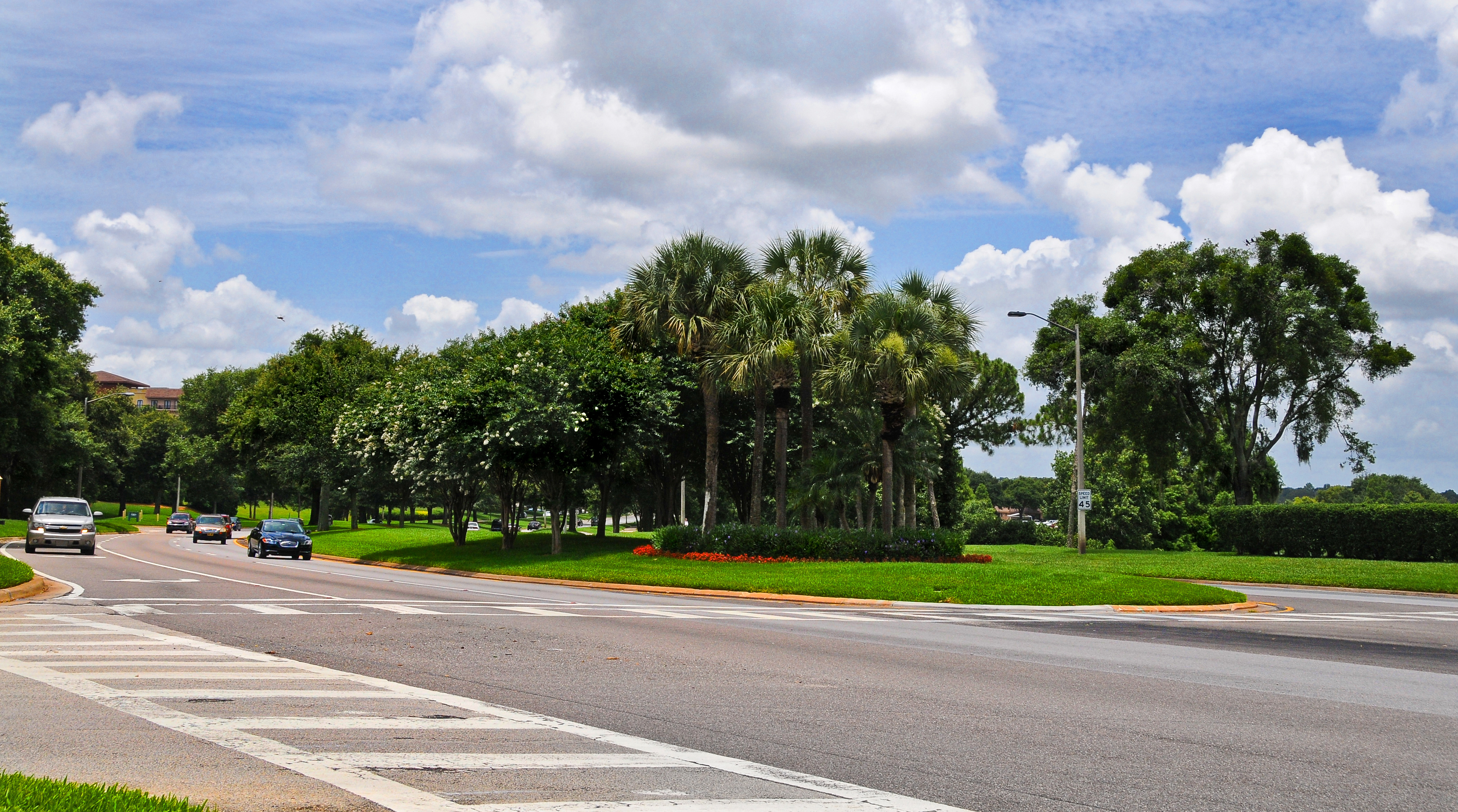
Hiawassee Rd was widened during the construction of MetroWest

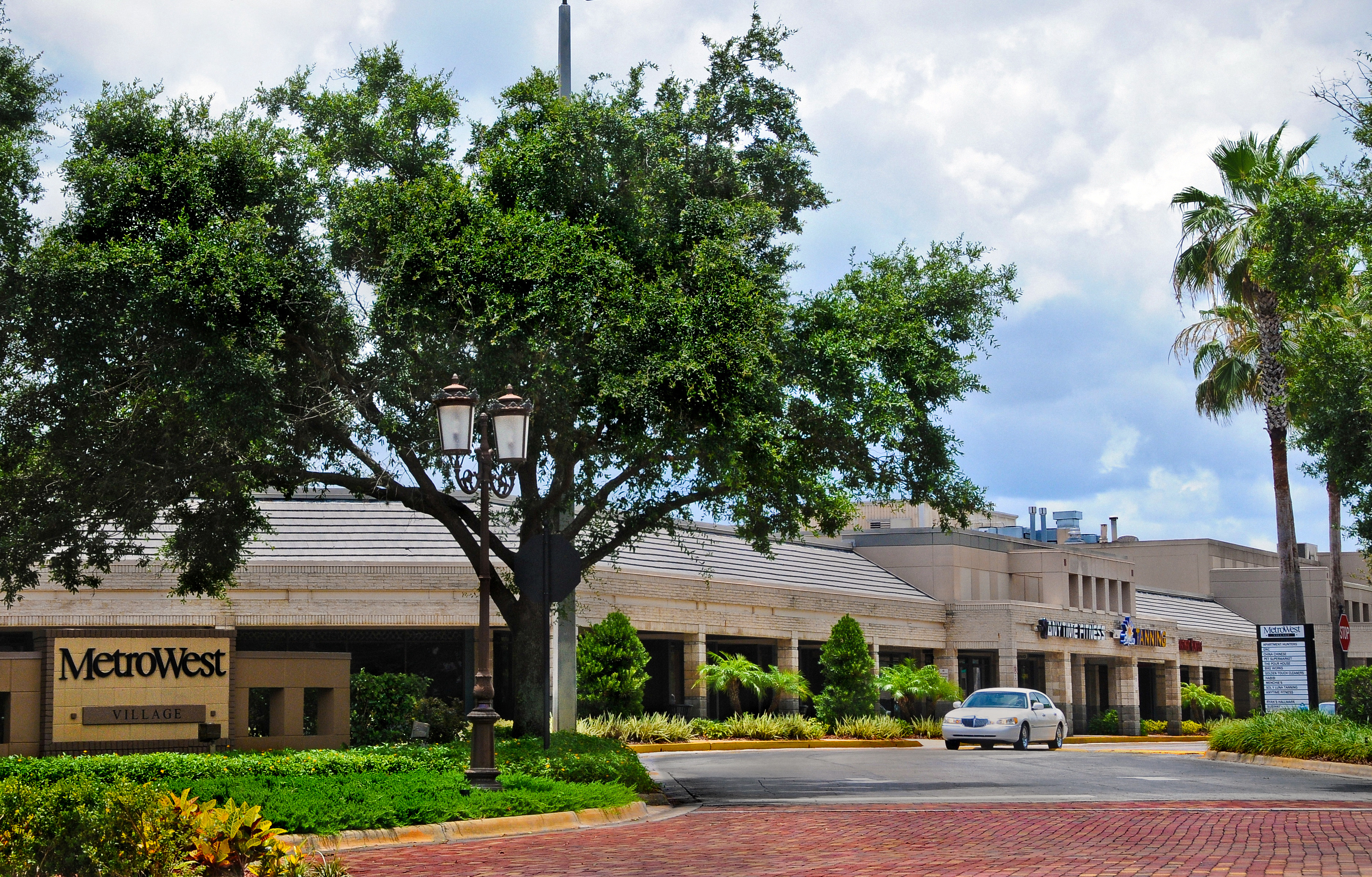
MetroWest Village, the first shopping center established in the community

After five years and an estimated $50 million worth of preparation, tracts of land were sold to developers and builders for residential and business projects. The Metrowest Master Association (MWMA) was established by Debra, Inc. on February 17, 1986, and thereafter, all construction and design plans are first examined by the Design Review Board (DRB) of the MWMA following strict guidelines before approval. The original master plan for the community included up to 4,500 residential units; 6 million square feet of office space, 2.5 million square feet of retail, restaurant, and industrial space; and 3,700 hotel rooms. Like other master-planned communities, the development was designed as a place where people can live, work and play. The 350-acre (140 ha) urban center, where dense development was planned, lies south of MetroWest Blvd and extends to Turkey Lake. The development has an about 1.5 miles (2.4 km) of frontage on the lake.

Work on the Metrowest Golf clubhouse was started in 1986. It was opened and dedicated the following year. The course was first managed by the Arnold Palmer Golf Management. Residential development near the community's 18-hole golf course was started in 1987. By 1989, about 700 single-family homes or villas have been built or planned. Another 1,300 apartment units had been built or were on the drawing boards. Development was also started on the community's most exclusive residential area, Palma Vista, a planned 200-lot subdivision that surrounds the 13th and 14th holes of the golf course on the highest land in the community. The crest of the property, at an elevation of 198 feet (60 m) above sea level, is one of the highest points in Orange County and offers views of downtown Orlando's skyline 5 miles (8.0 km) to the east. The community's first shopping center, MetroWest Village at the corner of S. Hiawassee Rd and Westpointe Blvd, was opened in the fall of 1990 completely leased.

== Residential neighborhoods ==
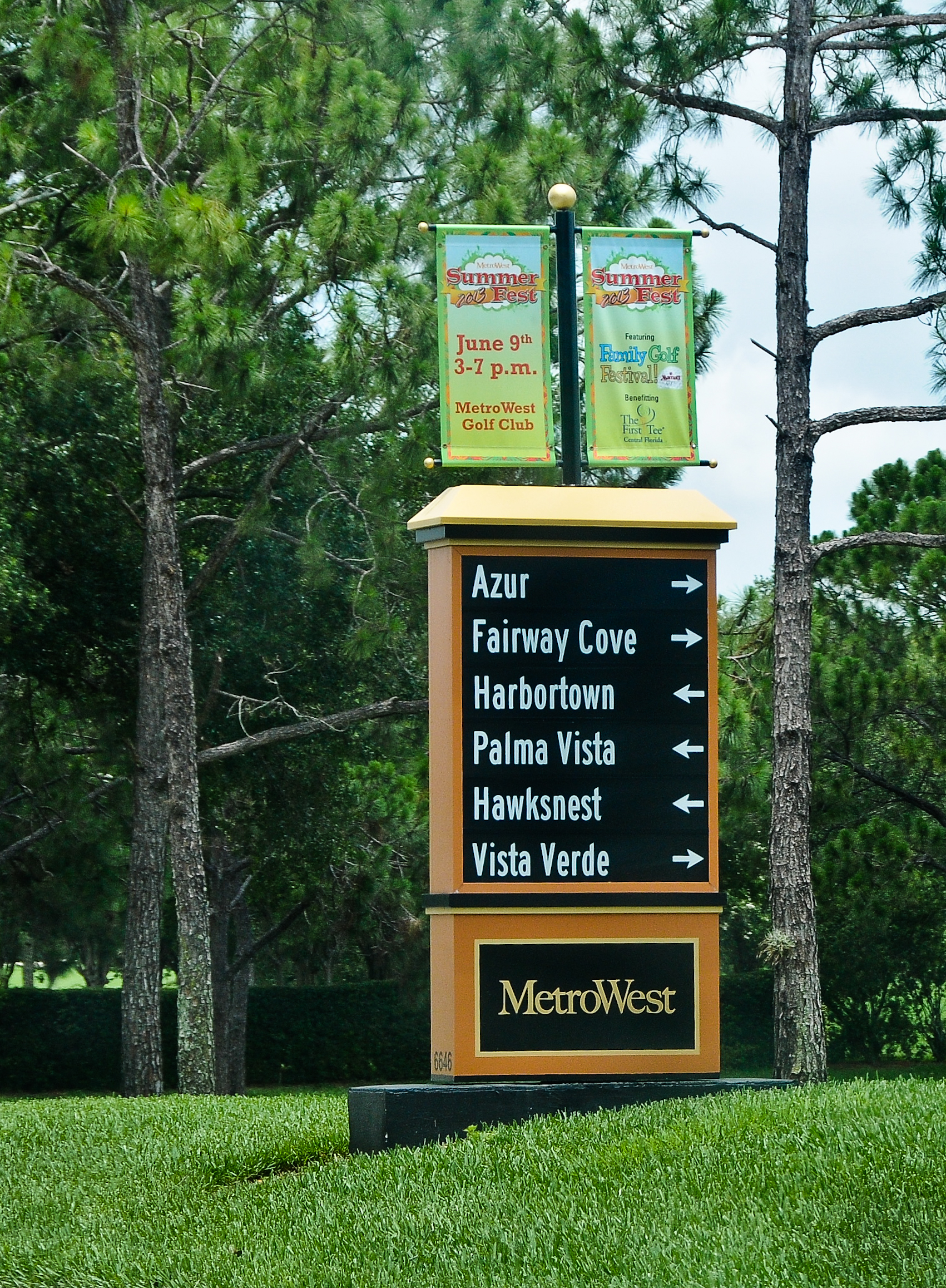
A directory-road sign on Hiawassee Rd showing the neighborhoods in MetroWest.

=== Homes ===
There are nine subdivisions with single-family homes and one townhome complex in Metrowest with a total 1,259 residential units.

No.	Subdivision	Address	No. of single-family homes
1	Fairway Cove	S. Hiawassee Rd.	140
2	Hawksnest	S. Hiawassee Rd.	91
3	MetroWest Unit 5: a) Abingdon Hill b) Bardmoor c) St. Andrews	Westpointe Blvd.	367 Total
4	Palma Vista	Westpointe Blvd.	189
5	Stonebridge Lakes	Shallot Dr.	103
6	Villa Capri (townhomes)	Arnold Palmer Dr.	141
7	Vista Royale	Vista Royale Blvd.	70
8	Westchester	Piccadilly Lane	160
9	Ridgemoore	Bridgestone Dr	

=== Condominiums ===
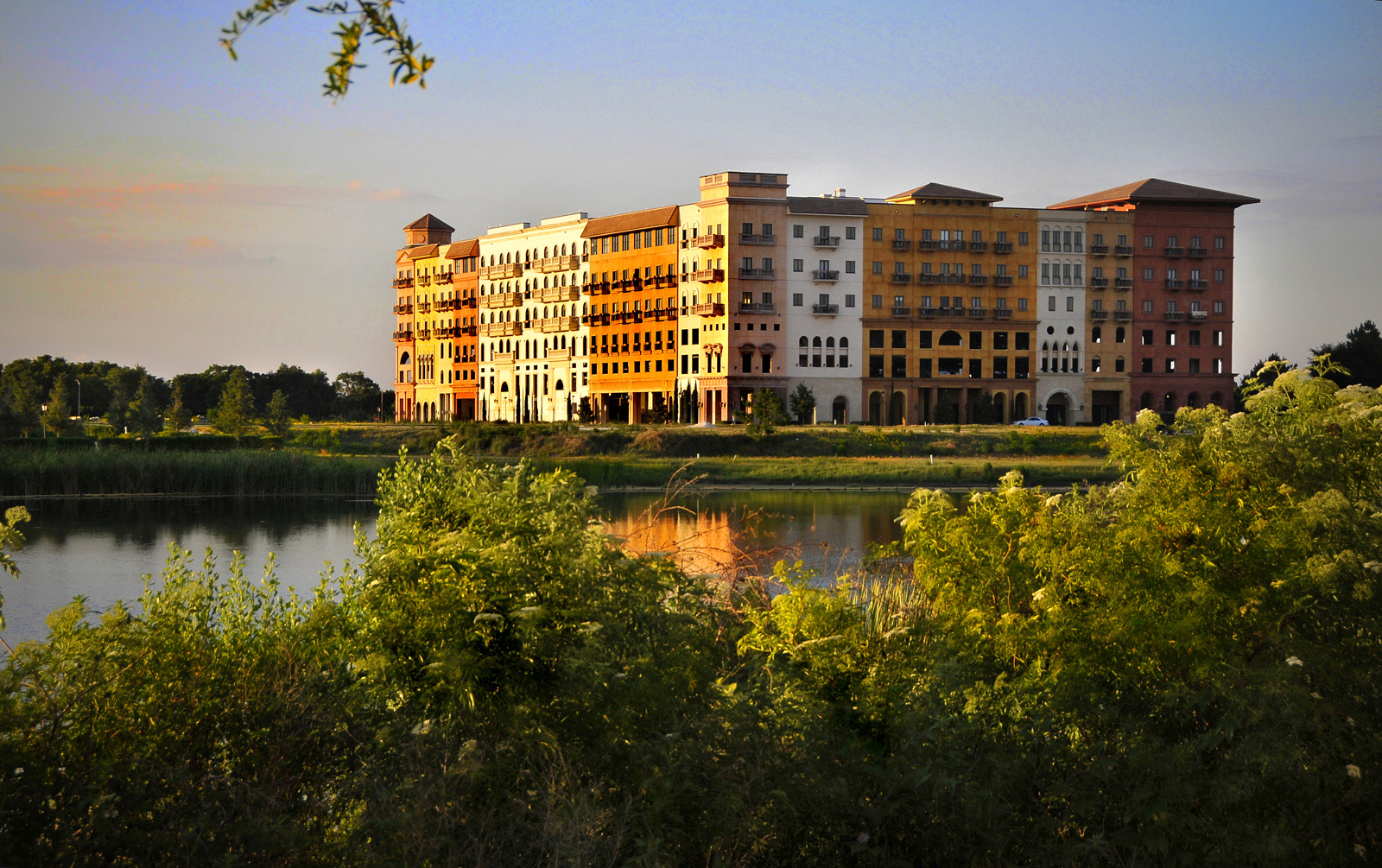
The Residences at Veranda, a 142-unit condominium in MetroWest

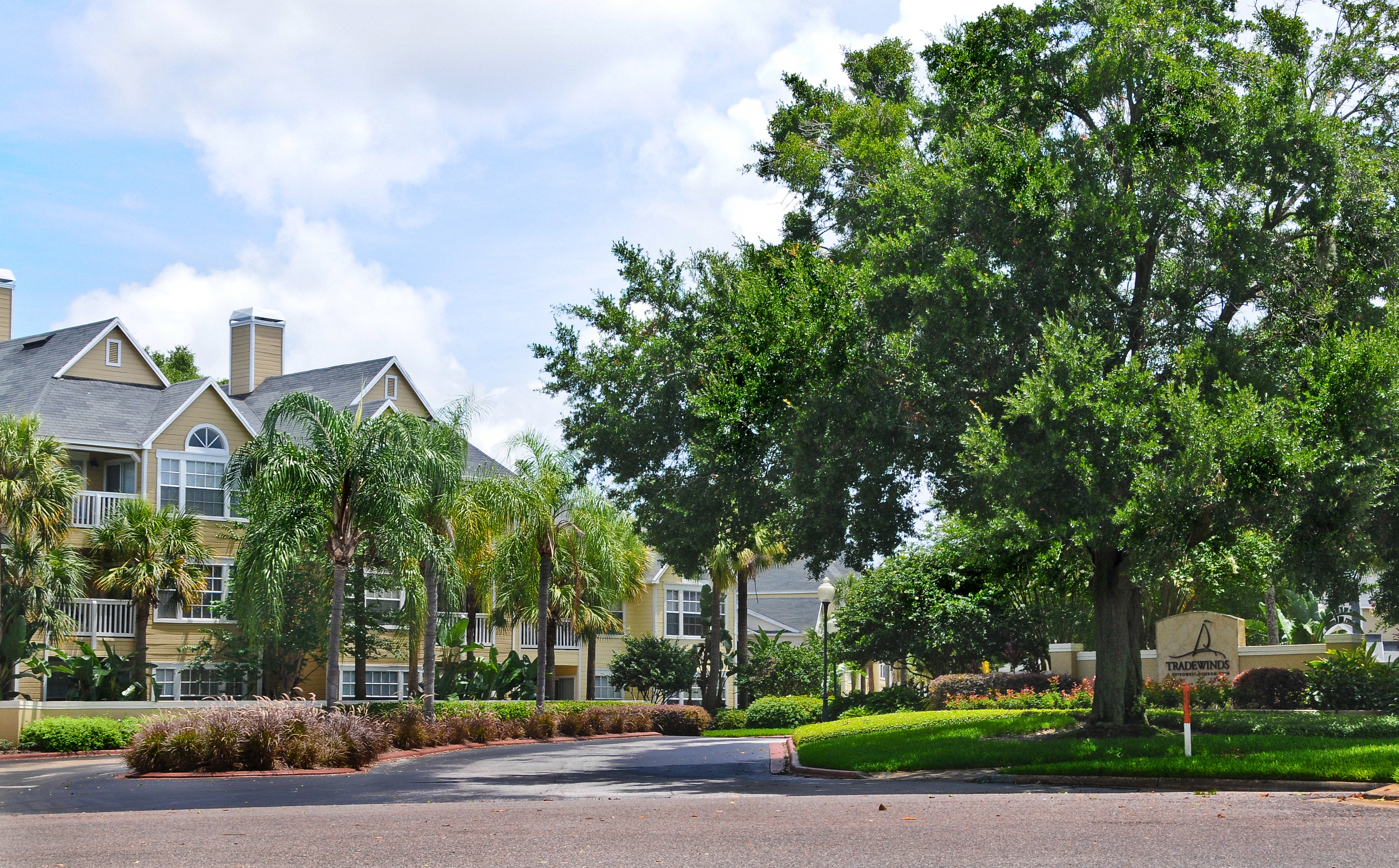
The Tradewinds on S. Hiawassee Rd

Fourteen condominium complexes with over 4,851 residential units. Some of these dwellings were previous apartments converted into condominiums during the housing boom.

No.	Condominium complex	Location	No. of units
1	Azur at MetroWest (formerly Colonial Grand at MetroWest and Centergate MetroWest)	Raleigh St.	311
2	Bermuda Dunes	Westpointe Blvd.	336
3	Central Park at MetroWest (formerly Victoria Point Apts.)	Westgate Dr.	400
4	Fountains at MetroWest (formerly Toscana at MetroWest)	Westgate Dr.	238
5	The Hamptons at MetroWest	Times Square Ave.	766
6	Madison at MetroWest (formerly Worthing at MetroWest)	Robert Trent Jones Dr.	364
7	Promenade	Buford St.	124
8	Residences at Veranda	Grande Ave.	142
9	Serenata (formerly Douglas Grand at MetroWest)	MetroWest Blvd.	398
10	Stonebridge Commons: a) Carriage Homes b) Mandalay c) Ventura d) Vistas	Ducados Pointe	622 Total a) 172 b) 104 c) 200 d) 146
11	Stonebridge Lakes	Shallot Dr.	208
12	Stonebridge Place a)Horizons b) Vistas	Tolstoy Lane	310 Total a) 180 b)130
13	Stonebridge Reserve	Robert Trent Jones Dr.	296
14	What remains of Tradewinds	S. Hiawassee Rd.	544

=== Apartments ===
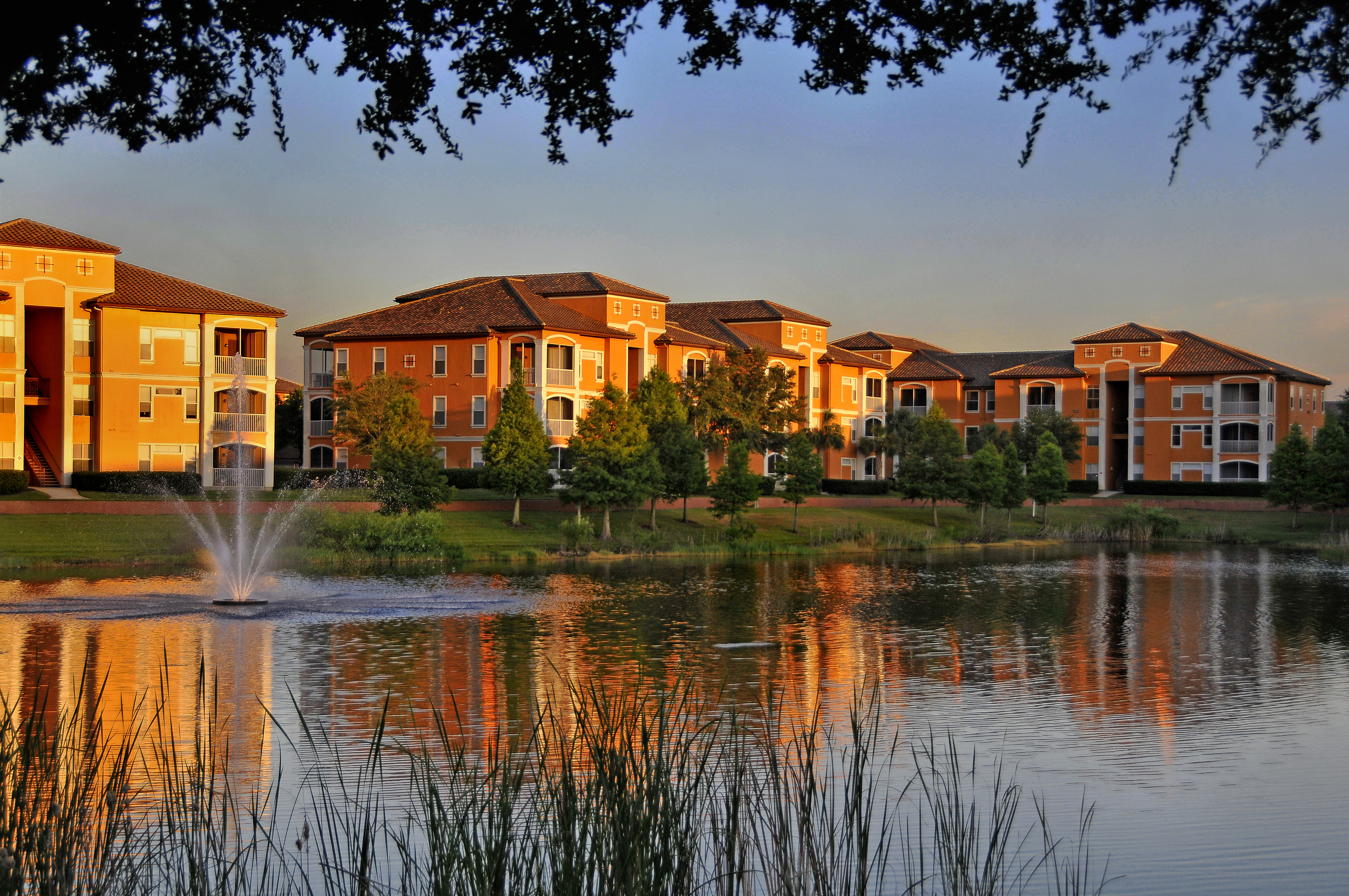
The La Palazza apartment complex located along Turkey Lake

Ten complexes with a total of 3,557 units make up the apartments in MetroWest.

No.	Apartment complex	Location	No. of units
1	Amara at MetroWest (formerly Vinings Club at MetroWest)	Raleigh St.	456
2	The Estates at Park Avenue	Biltmore Park Dr.	432
3	Harbortown (aka Gates of Harbortown)	Lake Debra Dr.	428
4	La Palazza (formerly Alexan Club at MetroWest)	Lake Debra Dr.	510
5	Landmark at Siena Springs (formerly Lexington Park)	Westgate Dr.	252
6	Marina Landing	Westgate Dr.	260
7	Indigo West (formerly Sabal Palm at MetroWest)	Raleigh St.	411
8	The Summit	MetroWest Blvd.	280
9	Vista Verde	S. Hiawassee Rd.	200
10	Alvista at MetroWest (formerly The Element at MetroWest)	Lake Debra Dr.	328

=== Others ===
- Golf Ridge is a 59-unit condominium complex off of S. Hiawassee Rd. near Raleigh St. that is completely surrounded, but not part of MetroWest.

== Education ==
=== Schools located within Metrowest ===
- MetroWest Elementary School is a public school on Lake Vilma Rd. that was opened in 1986 to serve the children of the community from PK to Grade 5.
- Valencia College West Campus, along Kirkman Rd, was awarded as the top community college of the nation in 2011 by the Aspen Institute College Excellence Program.

=== Middle school ===
Students who live west of South Hiawassee Drive are zoned to attend Gotha Middle School on Gotha Road in Windermere, Florida. Students east of South Hiawassee Drive go to Chain of Lakes Middle School on Conroy-Windermere Road in also in Windermere.

=== High school ===
High school students living in MetroWest are zoned to Olympia High School on Apopka-Vineland Road in Orlando, which opened in August 2001.

== Awards ==
- Winner of the Orlando's City Beautiful Award for District 6 in 2012 for its well-kept, aesthetically pleasing grounds, and litter-free environment.
- Metrowest is the statewide winner for the 2013 Safety and Security Award from the Florida Communities of Excellence awarded on April 5, 2013.

== See also ==
- Baldwin Park
- Celebration
- Dr. Phillips
- Isleworth
- Lake Nona
- Winter Garden
