= Delaney Park, Orlando, Florida =

Delaney Park
- Neighborhood
- Interactive map of Delaney Park
- Coordinates: 28.525°N 81.369°W
- Country: United States
- State: Florida
- City: Orlando
- Website: cityoforlando.net/parks/delaney-park/

Delaney Park is a neighborhood located south of downtown Orlando, Florida, United States. It is named after Monte Delaney.

Delaney Park can be noted for brick streets, mix of homes dating from the 1920s to present day, large oak trees, and close proximity to Orlando Regional Medical Center, Winnie Palmer Hospital for Children and Orlando's Amtrak Station.

Local public schools include Boone High and Blankner Elementary.
