= Lake Eola Heights Historic District =

Historic district in Florida, United States

- U.S. National Register of Historic Places
- U.S. Historic district
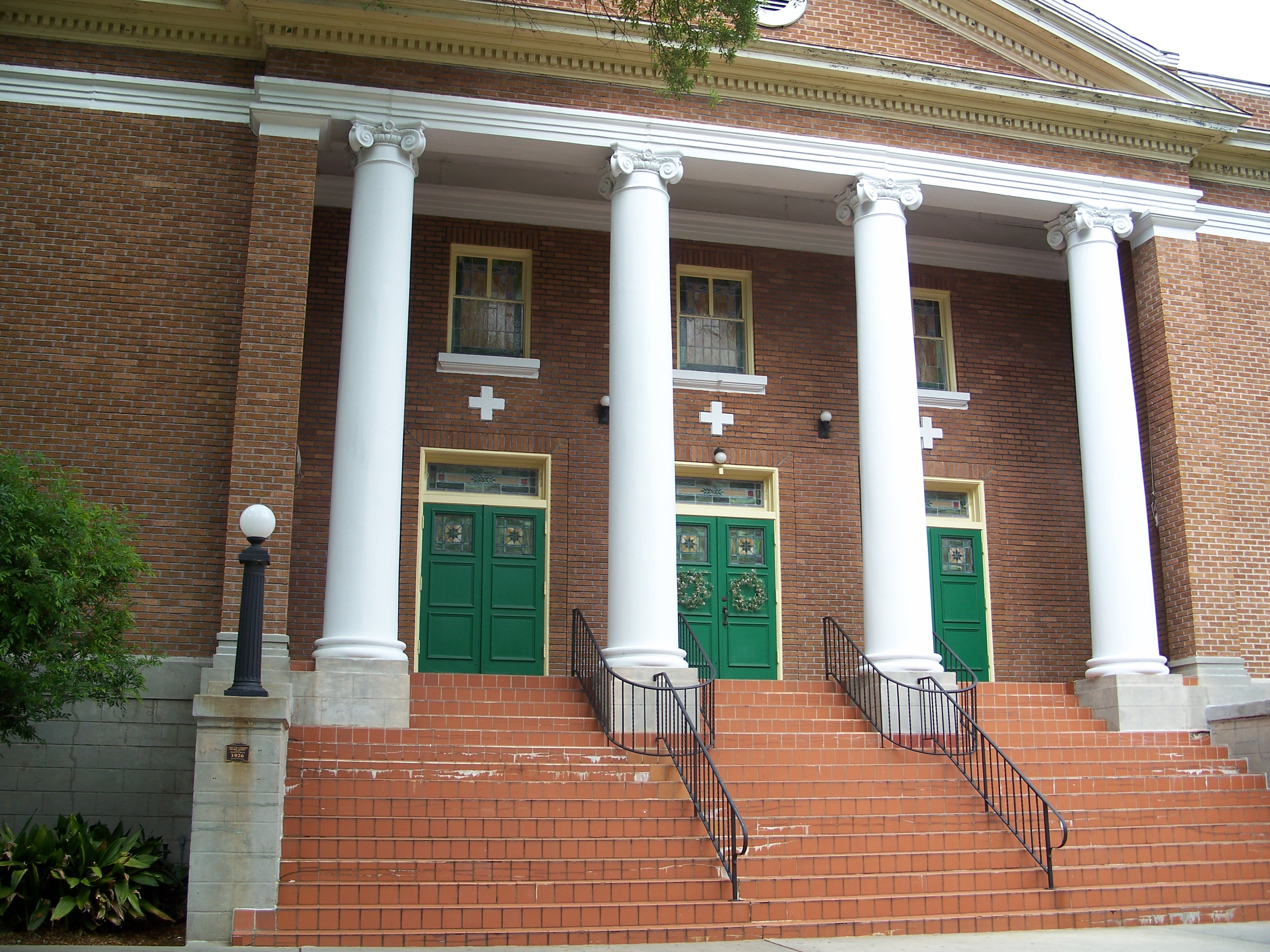
- Church in the district

- Location within Florida Location within the United States
- Location: Orlando, Florida
- Coordinates: 28°32′57″N 81°22′15″W
- NRHP reference No.: 91001912
- Added to NRHP: January 16, 1992

The Lake Eola Heights Historic District is a U.S. historic district (designated as such on January 16, 1992) located in the eastern part of Downtown Orlando, Florida. The district is roughly bounded by Hillcrest Street, North Hyer Avenue, Ridgewood Street and North Magnolia Avenue. It contains 487 historic buildings.

Citrus grower Jacob Summerlin, Orlando's first city council president, purchased 200 acres in the area during the late 19th century. The Great Freeze of 1894-95 brought Summerlin's citrus farm to an end, and the property was subdivided for housing. Architectural styles include Farmhouse, Colonial Revival, Craftsman, Mediterranean Revival, Mission Revival, Art Deco, and Minimal Traditional

In 1989 the City of Orlando designated the neighborhood a local historic district in response to a petition by the Lake Eola Heights Historic Neighborhood Association. Three years later the neighborhood was added to the National Register of Historic Places.
