= Baldwin Park, Florida =

Baldwin Park
- Master-planned community
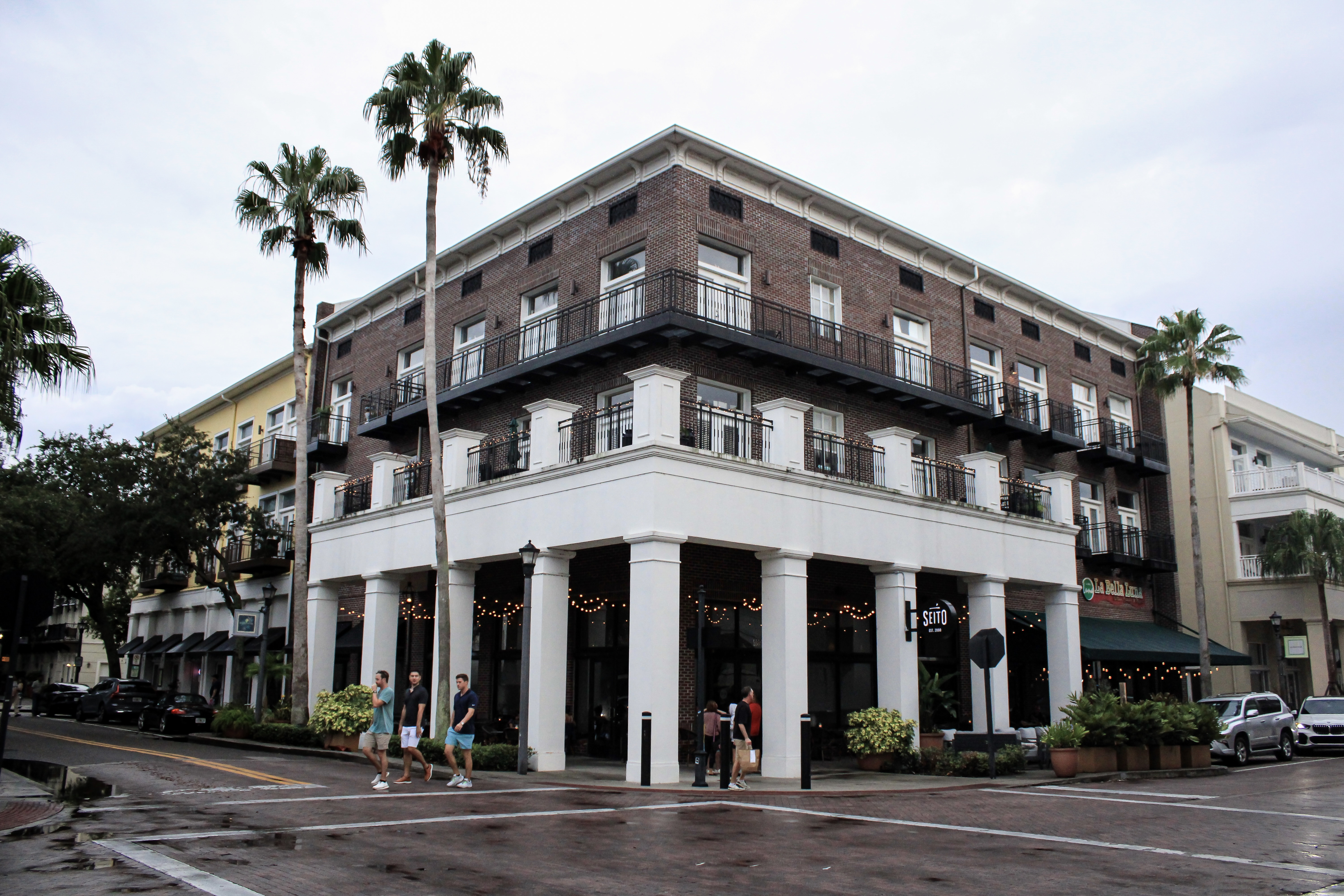

- Location within Florida
- Coordinates: 28°34′05″N 81°19′35″W
- Country: United States
- State: Florida
- County: Orange
- City: Orlando
- Founded: 1998

Government
  - Type: Community Development District
  - Body: Urban Orlando Community Development District Board of Supervisors
  - Chair: Diana Edwards Pienaar

Area
  - Total: 1,100 acres (450 ha)
- Time zone: UTC-5 (Eastern (EST))
  - Summer (DST): UTC-4 (EDT)
- Zip code: 32803, 32814
- Area codes: 407 and 321
- Website: Baldwin Park Official Website

Baldwin Park is a neighborhood in Orlando, Florida. Developed as a mixed-use master-planned community, the neighborhood is situated in northeast Orlando (located 4 miles (6.4 km) northeast of Downtown Orlando), bordering the municipality Winter Park. The neighborhood was developed in the late 1990s and early 2000s by Orlando NTC Partners (Baldwin Park Development Company), an Orlando-based developer.

Headed by architect Jim Constantine and his firm Looney Ricks Kiss (LRK), in combination with other collaborators and stakeholders, the team incorporated New Classical and New Urbanism architectural elements. The first structures in the community were built in 2003. The community has over 3,000 residential units and over 2,700 square feet of commercial and office space. Housing options in Baldwin Park includes a wide range of options, including single-family homes, townhomes, and luxury apartments.

== Geography ==
The 1,100-acre (450 ha) mixed-use community is located in northeastern Orlando, near Orlando Executive Airport, Orlando Fashion Square Mall, and Colonial Drive. The community is bordered by Winter Park to the north, and the Orlando neighborhood of Audubon Park to the west.

== History ==
During most of the 20th century, from the era of World War II until the mid-1990s, the area that currently is Baldwin Park, was utilized by the U.S. military. It was the location of Orlando Army Air Station and the Main Base for the Naval Training Center (NTC). The vast area also encompassed what currently is the Audubon Park neighborhood of Orlando, the Orlando Fashion Square Mall, Orlando Executive Airport, and other adjacent areas.

After World War II those areas were returned to the City of Orlando (to develop those areas), and in the early 1960s the Air Station closed its doors. The remainder of the property was utilized solely by the Navy, as the country's third largest Naval Training Center, which included a Naval Hospital. NTC's three major commands that were headquartered at its base included the Recruit Training Command, the Service School Command, and the Nuclear Power School. Under the 1993 Base Realignment and Closure Commission, NTC, among a list of other military bases, was recommended to close by the Base Realignment and Closure Commission (BRAC). The Recruit Training Command and Naval Hospital closed in March 1995, the Service School Command closed in November 1996, and the Navy Nuclear Power Training Command closed in December 1998. All operations officially ceased at NTC on April 30, 1999. Following BRAC's decision to close NTC, former Orlando Mayor Glenda Hood appointed a Base Reuse Commission, which composed of numerous local stakeholders. The commission's purpose was to identify proposals for economic development for the soon-to-be closed base.

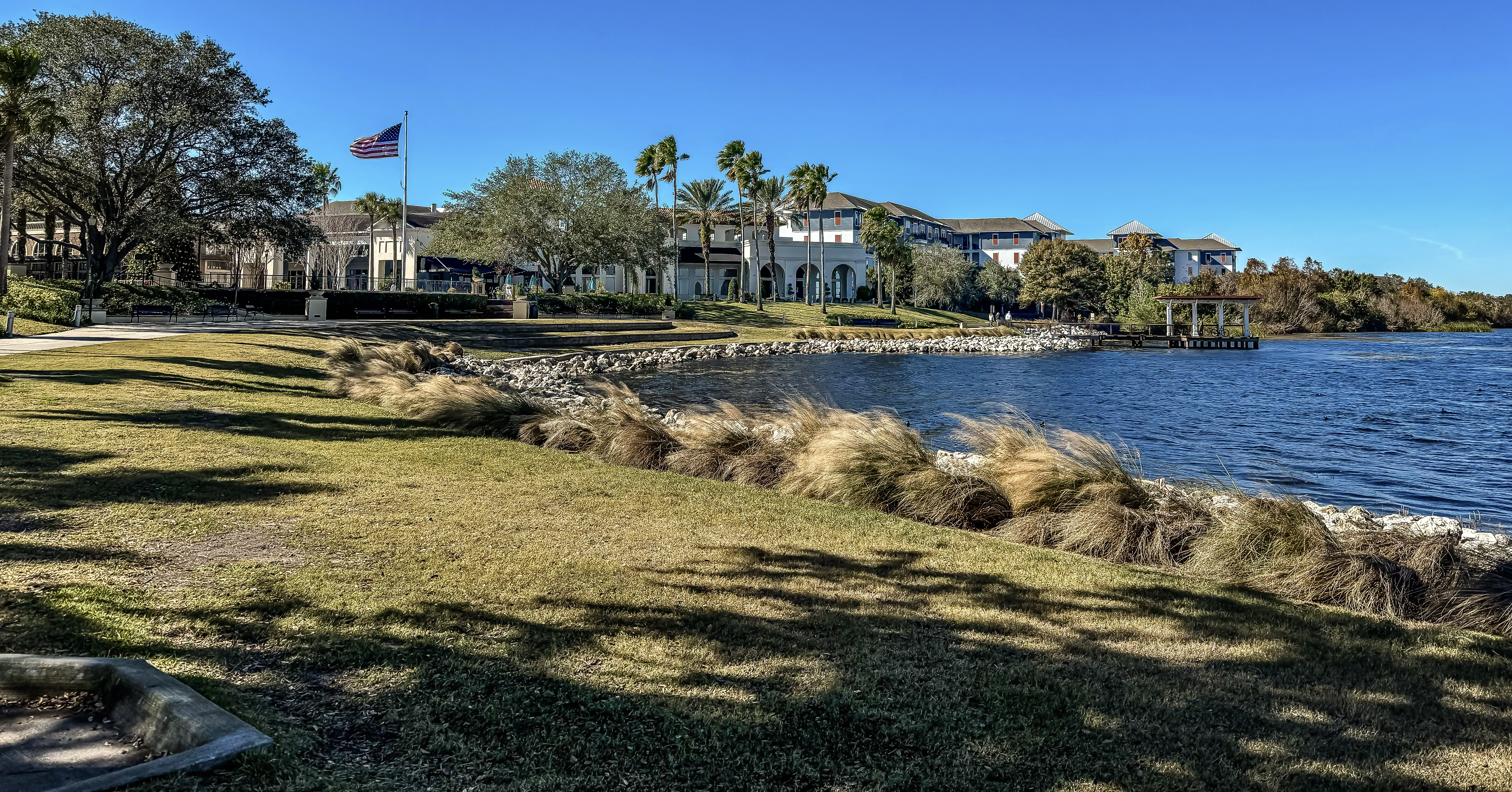
Harbor Park and waterfront located on Lake Baldwin

In 1997, several consultant teams were commissioned to propose detailed Urban Design sketches. The City of Orlando allowed input from the public on the various different proposals. The final draft of these proposals, known as "The Vision Plan", provided for approximately 3,000 residential units and over 2,700,000 square feet of commercial space. "The Vision Plan" incorporated New Urban city-planning elements, that were en vogue in the 1990s. In the mid-1990s, the master-planned New Urban community of Celebration, Florida, located in nearby Osceola County, Florida, was recently developed by The Walt Disney Company. Located near Walt Disney World, the community took inspiration from Walt Disney's EPCOT (concept) for Walt Disney World (prior to his death).

Similar to the New Urban design elements of Celebration, "The Vision Plan" for Baldwin Park, included a pedestrian friendly Village Center with high density residential units, while also balancing and preserving aspects of nature in its design. The city held an open-bid of prestigious developers to develop the project. In 1998, the City of Orlando chose the development company Orlando NTC Partners (aka Baldwin Park Development Co.) to develop "The Vision Plan". On October 27, 1999, the city council unanimously voted in support of the purchase of the officially ceased NTC. The Navy, moments later, agreed to sell the property to Orlando NTC Partners. By 2003, the first structures in the community were built. The entire master-planned community was completed by 2008. The community was named after Robert H. B. Baldwin, who served as the undersecretary of the United States Navy in the 1960s.

== Community ==
With over 7,000 residents, the community has a wide array of housing options. Single family home offerings include both townhomes and detached single-family homes. Single-family homes in the community take architectural cues from many popular Florida styles, including Spanish Revival, New Classical, American Craftsman, Florida Vernacular, and Mediterranean Revival. The community is also home to several luxury apartment developments, including Baldwin Harbor Apartments, Enders Place Apartments, Majestic Apartments, Village at Baldwin, and MMA Baldwin Park Apartments.

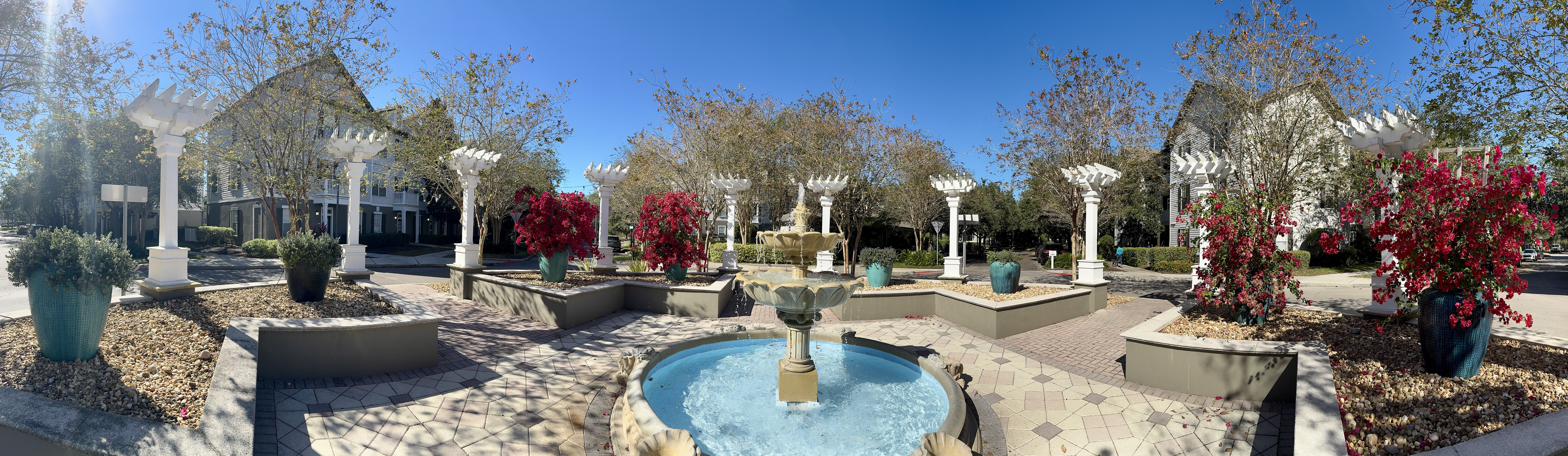
Small garden with a fountain.

=== Village Center ===
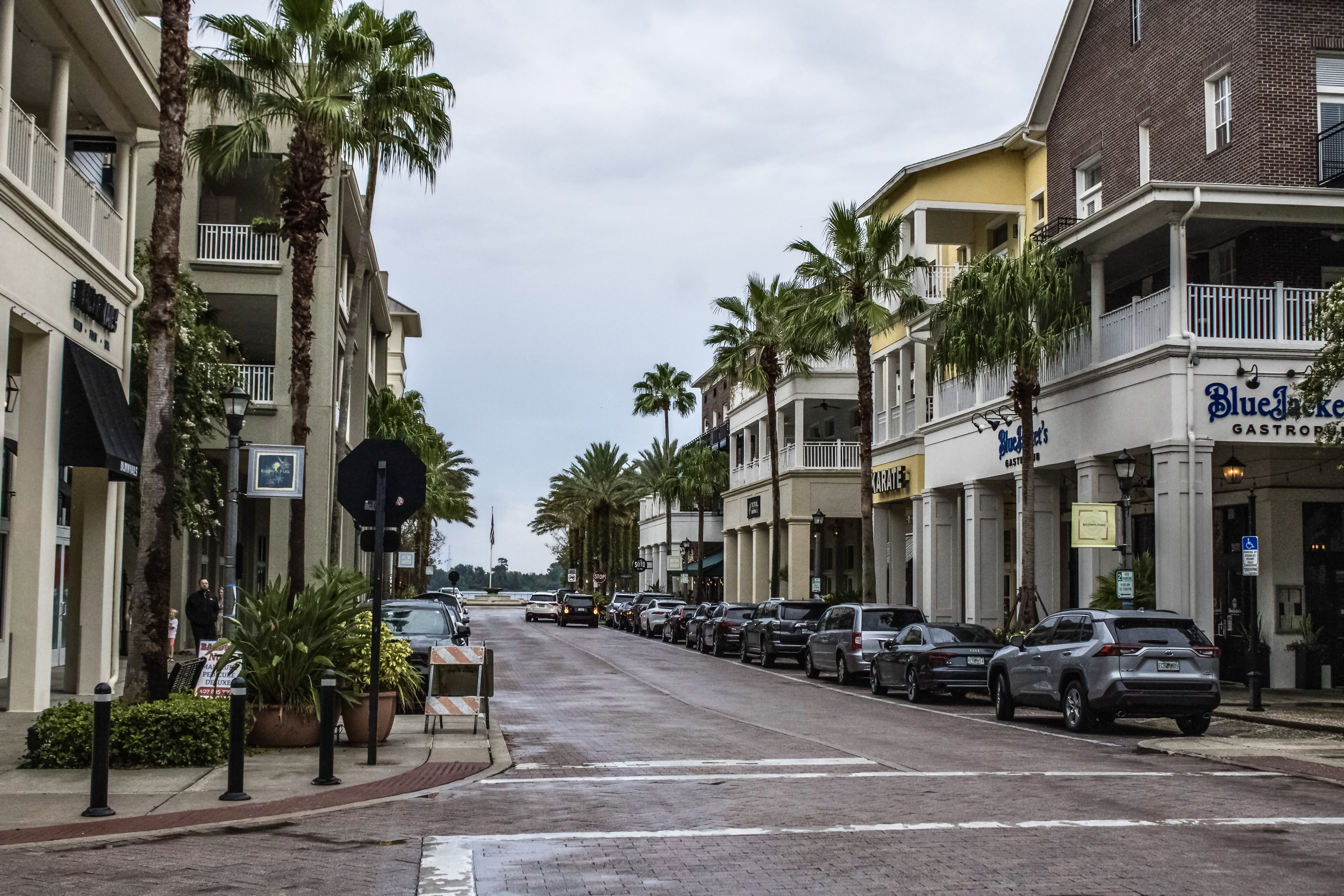
Baldwin Park Village Center

Baldwin Park Village Center is the central commercial area for the community. Cohesive with the community's New Urban cityscape, its downtown is inspired by other eclectic Florida Main Streets. The downtown area features boutiques, offices, bars, and high-end restaurants.

=== Lake Baldwin ===
At the center of the community, is the 196 acre Lake Baldwin. The center of recreation for Baldwin Park, the lake features Lake Baldwin Trail around its entire perimeter. Harbor Park is a scenic waterfront along Lake Baldwin, at the very front of the Baldwin Park Village Center. Lake Baldwin Park is another city park with additional recreational options such as trails, playgrounds, pavilions, a dog park, and a boat launch located along the aforementioned lake. Its main entrance is located in neighboring Winter Park.

== Education ==
=== Schools located within Baldwin Park ===
- Baldwin Park Elementary School
- Glenridge Middle School

=== High school ===
High school students living in Baldwin Park are zoned to Winter Park High School on Summerfield Road in neighboring Winter Park, Florida. Opened in 1923, it is one of the oldest high schools in Orange County. Winter Park High School was originally located on Huntington Avenue and remained at that location until construction began in 1969 for a new campus building on Summerfield Road, the school's current location. The original campus building on Huntington Avenue remains in use as the Winter Park High School Ninth Grade Center (which is a campus exclusively for the school's ninth-grade students).

== See also ==
- Azalea Park
- Celebration
- Golden Oak at Walt Disney World Resort
- MetroWest
- Lake Nona
- Winter Park
