= Winter Park Library =

Coordinates: 28.595683°N 81.346251°W

- Location: 1052 W. Morse Blvd., Winter Park, FL 32789
- Established: December 9, 1885
- Branches: 1

Other information
- Director: Melissa Schneider (March 2023-Present)
- Website: https://www.winterparklibrary.org

The Winter Park Library is a 501(c)(3) nonprofit lending library in Winter Park, Florida.

== History ==
The library was founded on December 9, 1885, by a group of nine women who came together to create a library for the community of Winter Park. Books were previously circulated in an organized reading circle. The need for a library accompanied the town's growth following the construction of the South Florida Railroad and the opening of Rollins College. With the intent of creating a lending library for the community, the group held a meeting at the Congregational Parsonage, now the location of the Rollins College campus, near the current site of the college's Archibald Granville Bush Science Center.

The first president of the library was Mrs. Elizabeth P. Hooker, the wife of a doctor and Congregational minister who was the president of Rollins College. She was raised by a professor at Middlebury College, where she received her education. Additional library board members included Mary McClure and Mary E. Brown, both retired teachers. Brown was remembered as "of a singularly acute and independent mind, a lover of the best books, a keen critic, and an unfailing source of intellectual stimulus to all who knew her." Fellow board members Alice Guild and her sister Clara Guild had moved to Winter Park from Boston with their father in 1883. At age 25, Alice was elected as a fundraiser for the library. Clara, though not one of the library's noted founders, was a member of the first class at Rollins and later received the college's first degree conferred to a woman. Another member, Evaline Lamson, served several years as a librarian for both the town and for Rollins College.

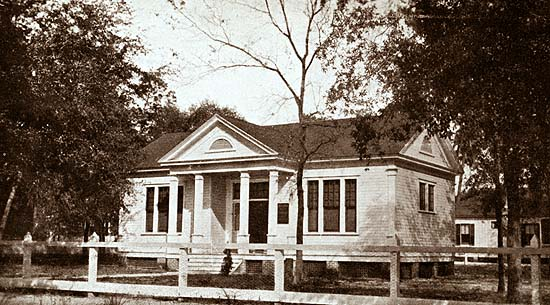
Winter Park Library, 1902

The main concern of the founding women was not how to get the necessary books for the library, as they had been circulating books among themselves for some time, but to find a location to house them. The first official site was the Lamson house at 503 Interlachen Avenue in Winter Park, initially operating only on Wednesdays and Saturdays. Records for 1887 list the most checked-out books as The Scarlet Letter, The Last Days of Pompeii, Jane Eyre, Ivanhoe, and The Rise of Silas Lapham. Biographies were also popular, such as those on Frederick the Great, along with religious titles, such as The Blood of Jesus, Thoughts on Personal Religion, and Scientific Theism. Since the library shelves and inventory were limited, the rules for borrowing material were that members could take out one book on Wednesday and Saturday and keep it for two weeks, with a one-week renewal. The library imposed a 10-cent fine for non-renewals, and those who were not members would only be allowed to take out books if they paid a $1 deposit plus 10 cents each week.

One year after the library's founding, as recorded in the minutes of the annual meeting held on December 16, 1886, the officers accepted an offer to move its operations from the Lamson residence to a room in a building occupied by the Winter Park Company on the southwest corner of New England and Park Avenues. The Winter Park Circulating Library Association wrote its constitution in 1888.

Economic troubles brought the library to the brink of closure in 1895. Much like today, Florida's two most significant commodities at the time were citrus fruits and tourism. Winter Park relied on winter visitors; however, according to The History of Orlando by Eve Bacon, "the temperature dropped to 24 degrees the Sunday after Christmas Day in 1894" and dropped even lower to a frigid 17 degrees in February. This hard freeze killed citrus trees, and potential visitors to the area who heard news of the poor weather decided and not to visit. The blow to the area's economy was evident in the library's December 1895 annual meeting, where the treasurer's report revealed an existing balance of $8.60. Despite the drop in profit, the overall bleak outlook of the time gave an unexpected boost in inventory, which may have been donated books by families moving from the area. The population of Winter Park fluctuated from the end of the nineteenth century to the beginning of the twentieth. However, the addition of some new wealthy residents brought donations, which enabled the library to buy more books in 1896.

In 1900, discussions on what should be included in a new, permanent building effectively set the library's policy for years to come, as the decision was made to include a children's department. The Winter Park Circulating Library Association president, Eleanora Comstock, called a meeting to propose plans and start fundraising efforts. Pledges of $1,216 were received by February 1901, and the estate of Francis Knowles donated land to be used for a new facility. The new location opened in April 1902. The new location also allowed the library to open every day. Fundraising consisted of outreach to the public and a financial commitment from the city government, which continues to this day.

Indoor plumbing was not part of the original design of the new building in 1900. Additionally, there were complaints about heat in the summer and cold in the winter.

The library eventually rebounded from its financial difficulty, due in part to a revitalized citrus industry and the construction of the new Seminole Hotel in 1912, following a period during which the original hotel – which had long been a great source of revenue for the library – had its building burned down. In addition, the town council agreed to provide free electricity to the library building in 1914. As a result of these developments and donations, the library added a kitchen wing the following year, which inspired the library's founders to begin a series of teas, fundraising socials, and other events of interest to potential patrons. The library eventually doubled in size in 1924 when they added two new wings and a restroom. By 1945, the library had 12,269 books and a circulation of 33,214.

Despite the library's additions, it remained a somewhat exclusive group of patrons, which many residents chose not to join. Furthermore, the library historically only served white townspeople. A separate library was founded in the black residential community in mid-1937. Founded by Dr. Edwin O. Grover, the Hannibal Square Library was established for African-American residents. It was dedicated to his wife, who had been an activist for the cause of education in the black community. Initially functioning as an independent library, it began receiving regular appropriations from the city in the 1950s, albeit on a smaller scale than that received by the Winter Park Library.

A children's room was added to the Winter Park Library in 1955. A popular place for children and local organizations to meet, neighbors maintained the grounds, donated to the organization, and planted shrubbery and flowers outside. The board of directors was composed of black and white residents. It was also around this time that the word "Public" was added to the title "Winter Park Public Library" to welcome more visitors. The Winter Park Public Library, integrated in 1962 and 1963, adopted a policy of library service to all residents of Winter Park, regardless of age, race, creed, color, or financial situation. In 1979, the Hannibal Square Library closed due to a decline in circulation, and the building and grounds were returned to the city's council.

Although it was initially proposed to build on to the existing library site, the issue of insufficient parking was the inspiration for constructing a new building on a different site. In September 1976, the city bought some land at 460 East New England Avenue. In July 1977, the library received a grant for construction on the site. Soon after, the Winter Park Public Library opened with nearly twice the square footage and increased parking spaces from thirteen to sixty-five. The facility was further expanded in 1994, adding a third floor to allow more space for services to patrons aged 12 to 18.

Lack of space led to the 2016 initiative to construct a new library building. In March 2016, voters passed the issuance of a $30 million bond referendum to finance the cost of constructing this new facility. However, a public opposition group delayed the process for several years. In 2019, the area was temporarily renamed 'the Canopy': a campus in Winter Park with a 35,690 square-foot library and a 13,456 square-foot events center that was originally set to open in May 2021. Set within the 23-acre block that includes Martin Luther King Jr. Park, the Winter Park Canopy was proposed to offer views of the water's edge and natural surroundings, 230-plus parking spaces, and an outdoor amphitheater. Community efforts continued to fund additional amenities, including a porte-cochère, a rooftop venue, an indoor raked auditorium, and project enhancement opportunities. The campus was renamed the Winter Park Library and Events Center, and it opened at the new location in December 2021. The library's website describes the new offerings as an education and performance space, with three collaborative and working rooms, a business center, social spaces near age-appropriate book collections, a computer lab, private study rooms, a "Dream Room Lab" with 3D printers, a studio with video and audio production, and a larger story room adjacent.

== Services, programs, and classes ==
The Winter Park Library offers books, DVDs, CDs, audiobooks, video games, software, tablet computers, mobile hotspots, computer keyboards, and bicycles.

Winter Park Library also offers programs, classes, and services available to the community, including meeting rooms for rent, voter registration, and computers for library cardholders to use. It also sells boat decals (for motorboat owners), allowing access to the Winter Park Chain of Lakes. The library is an early voting polling place for the Orange County, Florida Supervisor of Elections. The library's maker space, the Genius Lab, allows patrons to create various content, including 3D models, videos, audio recordings, and graphics.

Classes are available to cardholders, including language development, kids' programs, tutoring, storytelling, and entertainment, writing workshops, book clubs, financial education, web content creation, and coding. Youth programs include the Angel Paws to Read, which offers students age 5+ the opportunity to read to therapy and service dogs to earn "paw stamps" towards free books and T-shirts, and Wobbly Walkers for ages 13–24 months, which features activities and story time.

== Special Collections ==
- The core of the Winter Park Library Archives and Special Collections was established through donations from local historian and businesswoman Eve Bacon. In 1976, Bacon donated her numerous files of Winter Park information to the Winter Park Public Library and set into motion the active acquisition and preservation of materials about the city of Winter Park and its residents. The collection continues to grow through the library's acquisition efforts and donations from community members. To preserve Winter Park's history, the collection includes maps, photographs, newspaper clippings, periodicals, scrapbooks, city government records, books, pamphlets, and correspondence.
- The Winter Park Library Archives and Special Collections act as a depository for the DAR Scrapbooks documenting the activities of the William Pope Duval Chapter of the Daughters of the American Revolution, established May 15, 1957. The scrapbooks date from the 1970s to the mid-1990s. The Winter Park Public Library accepted the chapter's scrapbooks for their living history section.
- In celebration of the city's inaugural "Weekend of the Arts" celebration, the Winter Park Sidewalk Art Festival's "Best of Show" Collection features art and scrapbooks compiled by the Winter Park Sidewalk Art Festival. Showcased in many areas of the library and event center, this collection documents the annual event, which began in 1961.
- Digital collections are also available through the Winter Park Library Archives and Special Collections. This extensive collection includes historical information about individuals and families from Winter Park; notable homes, businesses, parks, and other locations; events such as festivals, celebrations, and activities; and information about clubs, organizations, publications, and other miscellaneous subjects.

== Reciprocity with the Orange County Library System ==
Because the Winter Park Library is partially owned, operated, and funded by the city's taxpayers and is not part of the county-operated Orange County Library System (OCLS), residents of Winter Park are not automatically given privileges or access to the OCLS branches or services; instead, an agreement was reached between the city and the OCLS, whereas a city resident can go to any OCLS branch and request a "reciprocal borrower card," which is provided free of charge. The reciprocal borrower card is valid for four years. It can be used at any OCLS branch except the Melrose Center at the Orlando Public Library, which requires a separate Melrose Center-specific card to be issued after the user applies for it and goes through a mandatory orientation class. Reciprocal borrowers are provided a free one-hour session on the OCLS library PCs every day with additional hours purchasable for $1. The OCLS Wi-Fi network available at all branches remains free of charge to all users, including reciprocal borrowers and visitors who use their devices. As part of the agreement, OCLS cardholders are also eligible for a reciprocal card at the Winter Park Library valid for one year.
