= List of African American newspapers in Florida =

List of current and historic newspapers

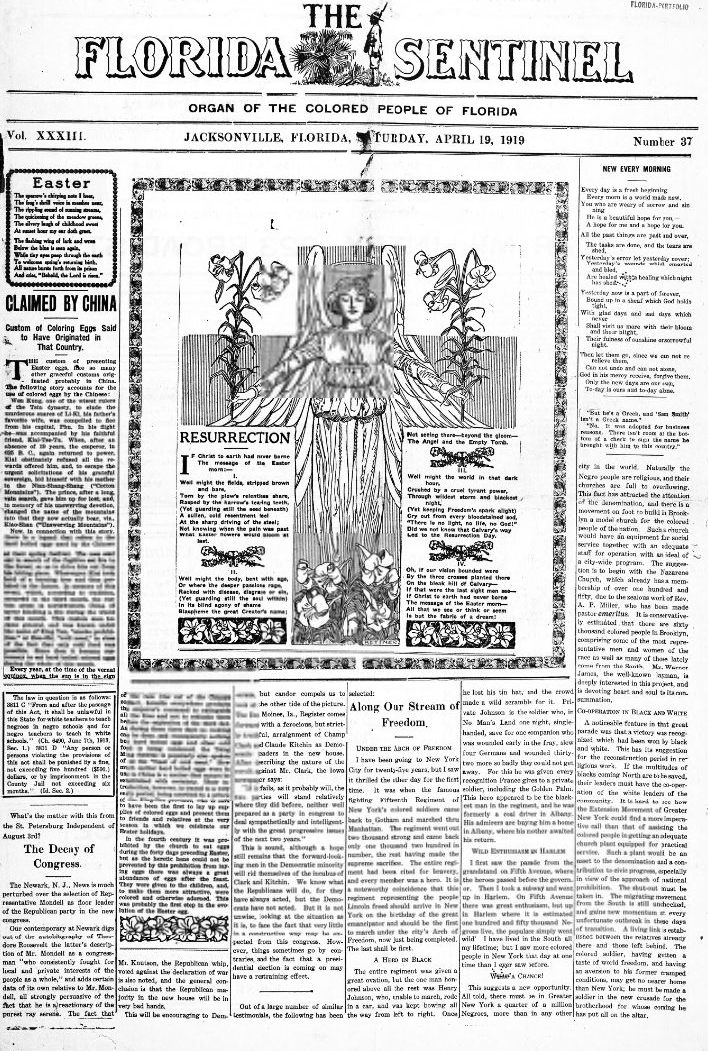
Front page of The Florida Sentinel from 1919.

This is a list of Black American newspapers that have been published in Florida. It includes both current and historical newspapers.

The earliest known Black American journalists in Florida were John T. Shuften and John Wallace, who both worked for newspapers that were otherwise white. The first newspaper by and for Black Americans in Florida was The New Era, which Josiah T. Walls purchased in 1873.

== Newspapers ==
City	Title	Beginning	End	Frequency	Call numbers	Remarks
Coral Springs / Pompano Beach	The Broward Times	1983?	?	Weekly	LCCN sn92005826, sn9205826; OCLC 26515574; ISSN 1065-1462	Published by Keith A. Clayborne.
Daytona Beach	The Daytona Times	1976 or 1978	current	Weekly	LCCN sn96027708; OCLC 27019747	Official site; Published by Charles W. Cherry II.
Eatonville	Eatonville Ledger	1886	1889			Edited by Reverend Speight.
Eatonville	Eatonville Speaker	1889	?	Weekly	LCCN sn97027593; OCLC 36700721	Managed by J.E. Clark.; "Published for a black audience, it was edited by Arthur C. Everett, the only white man living in Eatonville."
Fort Lauderdale	Florida Spur	1947	1950s?			
Fort Lauderdale	The Westside Gazette	1971	current	Twice weekly	OCLC 16172029	Official site
Fort Myers	The Community Voice	1988?	?	Weekly	LCCN sn96027396; OCLC 28171337; ISSN 1091-3149	Published by Charles P. Weaver.; Attested through at least 1993.
Fort Myers	People's Press (1978–); Community Voice (1988–); Community Press	1978	current	Monthly newspaper		Official site
Fort Pierce	The Chronicle	1957	1992	Weekly	LCCN sn89080094; OCLC 23588455	Founded by C.E. Bolen.; Featured a column and reporting by Zora Neale Hurston from 1957 to 1959.
Fort Pierce	Florida Courier	1990s	current	Weekly	LCCN sn96027397; OCLC 31457396	Official site; Edited by Charles W. Cherry.
Gainesville	Farmers' Journal	1884	1884			Published by Josiah T. Walls and Matthew M. Lewey, and dedicated to supporting Walls' 1884 Congressional campaign.
Gainesville	The Gainesville Journal	1986?	1900s	Weekly	LCCN sn96027401; OCLC 28372330	Managing editor Sylvia Watson.
Gainesville	The New Era	1873	1874?	Weekly	LCCN sn84027578; OCLC 11288614	Purchased from white former owners in 1873 by Josiah T. Walls. Newspaper originally established in 1865.
Gainesville / Pensacola (1900–1902) / Jacksonville (1919–)	The Florida Sentinel; The Standard-Sentinel (1917–1919)	1887	1900s	Weekly	LCCN 2011254368, sn83016246; OCLC 2704595, 748284995; Jacksonville: LCCN sn82016147; OCLC 2610944, 9169575; Pensacola: LCCN sn98062577; OCLC 40250476	Official organ of the Florida Independent Order of Good Samaritans and Daughters of Samaria and Florida Knights of Pythias.; Published by Matthew M. Lewey.; Became the Standard-Sentinel in 1917 upon Lewey's purchase of the Florida Standard.; Merged with Tampa Bulletin to form the Florida Sentinel Bulletin in 1919.
Gainesville	Gainesville Voice	1986?	?	Weekly	OCLC 38201487	Published by Michael Lewis.
Jacksonville	The Jacksonville Advocate	1930s	1987	Weekly	LCCN sn96027591; OCLC 35128997	Revived after going out of business by Isaiah Williams in mid-1970s.; Edited by Rita Luffborough Perry.
Jacksonville	The Jacksonville Advocate-Free Press	1987	1990	Weekly	LCCN sn96027590; OCLC 35127284	
Jacksonville	Afro-American Gazette	1900s	1900s			Attested from at least 1911–1912.
Jacksonville	Daily American	1894	1894	Daily		"[A] success in every way but financially."
Jacksonville	Florida Baptist	1887	1888			Edited by John Henry Ballou, who previously founded the first African American newspaper in Rhode Island, the Eastern Review.
Jacksonville	Florida Cyclone	1888	1888			Dedicated to the Republican presidential campaign.
Jacksonville	The Florida Evangelist	1896	1902	Weekly	LCCN sn82016146; OCLC 2610965, 9169447	Managing editor J. Martin Waldron.
Jacksonville	The Jacksonville Advocate; The Jacksonville Advocate-Free Press; The Jacksonville Free Press	1979 or 1986	current	Weekly	LCCN sn85007603, sn8507603, sn95007355, sn95047199, sn9507355, sn96027468; OCLC 35127038, 11991797, 19095970, 22656299; ISSN 0882-6560, 1081-3349	Official site; Published and edited by Rita Luffborough Perry.
Jacksonville	Edward Waters Globe	1892	?			
Jacksonville	Florida Labor Templar	1901	?			Edited by D.S.D. Billings, who previously edited the Florida Templar.; Continued through at least 1925.
Jacksonville	The Northwest Florida Advocate	1986?	?	Weekly	OCLC 28047530	Published and edited by Isaiah J. Williams III.; Attested through 1993.
Jacksonville	People's Journal; The People's Journal	1883	1893	Weekly	LCCN sn95026045; OCLC 32633998	Published by J.W. Thompson, who formerly published the Progressive Age at Columbus, Georgia.; Only African American paper in Jacksonville to survive the 1888 yellow fever epidemic.
Jacksonville	Progressive News	1938	?			Circulation of 7000 in 1940s, 3200 in 1950s.; Published and edited by Albert McKeever.
Jacksonville	The Florida Searchlight	1937?	?	Weekly		Edited by Harry Cherry.
Jacksonville	The Florida Standard	1906	1917			Edited by A.C. Porter.; Circulation of 17,000 in 1910.; Absorbed into the Sentinel in 1917.
Jacksonville	Florida Star; The Florida Star; Florida Star and News (1950s–1961)	1951	current	Weekly	LCCN sn83045210, sn83045218, sn96026695; OCLC 1408060, 2261130, 7327469; ISSN 0740-798X; Star and News: LCCN sn95047202; OCLC 33285611	Official site; Founded, published and edited by Eric O. Simpson.
Jacksonville	The Tri-weekly Florida Sun (1876); The Florida Sun (1876–1877); The Daily Sun (1877)	1876	?	Triweekly, then daily (except Monday)	Triweekly: LCCN sn95047214; OCLC 1671167; The Florida Sun: LCCN sn84022766; OCLC 10587405; The Daily Sun: LCCN sn95047215; OCLC 1558554	Free online archive (one issue); Published by N.K. Sawyer.
Jacksonville	Sunday School Lesson	1906?	?			Continued through at least 1917.; Published by H.G. Reed.
Jacksonville	The Florida Tattler	1934	1962?	Weekly	LCCN 2011254371, sn93062820, sn94081625; OCLC 27319272, 32229795, 664611226	Published by Porcher L. Taylor.; Circulation of 10,000 in 1962.
Jacksonville	Florida Templar	1886	1888			The only African American newspaper in Jacksonville supporting the temperance movement.; Edited by D.S.D. Billing.
Key West / Jacksonville (1885–)	News; Florida News (1883–); Southern Leader (1886–)	1882	1888	Weekly, then twice weekly		Published and edited by John Willis Menard.
Lakeland	The Weekly Bulletin	1969	1900s	Weekly (published on Friday)	LCCN sn97027619; OCLC 36923648	Edited by Otis Williams.
Marianna	West Florida Bugle	1880s	1920s			Founded by I. Buggs. Edited in 1925 by A. Purdee.
Miami	Haiti Vision	1994	?	Weekly	OCLC 34552864	
Miami	Haïti en Marche	1987	current	Weekly	LCCN sn92061416; OCLC 21271733	Official site; In French.
Miami	Haitian-American Business Journal	1991?	?	Biweekly	OCLC 34553044	Published by Thomas and Thomas.; Attested through at least 1995.
Miami	Liberty News	1961	?	Biweekly	LCCN sn83025646; OCLC 9724255	Published and edited by Rolle C. Gaylord.
Miami	The Miami Times	1923	current	Weekly	LCCN sn83004231, sn8304321, sn96027596; OCLC 2264129, 35130714; ISSN 0739-0319	Official site; First African American newspaper in Miami.; Founded by H.E.S. Reeves.
Miami	Miami Tropical Dispatch	1929	1965?	Weekly		Published and edited by Daniel R. Frances.
Miami	Miami Whip	1934	1950			
Milton	Colored Signal	1920s	1920s			Published by Erskin Williamson.
Ocala	Ocala Ledger	1887	1890			Founded by R.B. Brooks.
Ocala	Mahogany Revue	1988	current	Biweekly	LCCN sn96027359; OCLC 27865036; ISSN 1546-4555	Carried Spanish-language section from 1993 to 2000.; Official site
Ocala	The Florida Watchman	1924	?	Twice monthly	LCCN sn98026454; OCLC 40561583	Attested through at least 1974.; Founded by Mattie J. Shaw, who edited it until her death at age 100.
Opa Locka	Miami Courier	1979?	1983?	Weekly		Edited by David Alexander.
Orlando	Central Florida Advocate; Orlando Advocate	1990s	current	Weekly	LCCN sn96004537; OCLC 35325825; ISSN 1090-5715	Official site
Orlando	Afro-Chronicle: A View from the Other Side	1972?	1975	Weekly		Published by Boss Enterprises. Edited by Harold Troy.
Orlando	Central Florida Times	1945	1949			
Orlando	Record	1910?	1912?			First African American newspaper in Orlando.
Orlando	Sun; Florida Earth (1925); The Florida Sun and Mirror; Florida Sun-Mirror; Florida Sun-Review	1922	current	Weekly		Official site; Founded by H.M. Alexander as the Sun in 1922.; Published by Jo Lawrence Boden from 1931 to 1975.; Acquired Orlando Mirror around 1950, becoming the Sun and Mirror.; Purchased by James Macon in 1975, who also acquired Orlando Review from James Madison, the paper becoming the Sun-Review.
Orlando	The Orlando Times	1976	current	Weekly	OCLC 20456218	Official site; Founded by Norris Woolfork.; Published by Calvin Collins.; Circulation of 35000 in 1980s.
Palatka	The Palatka Advocate	1917	1927?			Founded by Clarence C. Walker.
Pensacola	The Colored Citizen; Pensacola Brotherhood	1910 or 1913 or 1914	1965	Weekly	LCCN sn95026103, sn96027744; OCLC 32822555, 36107504	Founded and edited until at least 1942 by F.E. Washington; subsequently edited by Alberta Hannon until the paper's closure in 1965.
Pensacola	Pensacola Courier	1935 or 1937	1960s?	Weekly	LCCN sn99026999; OCLC 43029663	Founded by Nathaniel N. Baker.
Pensacola	Pensacola Enterprise	1887	1888			Published by W.H. Mixon, formerly of the Selma, Alabama Dallas Post.
Pensacola	The Pensacola Exposure	1971	?	Weekly	LCCN sn99027029; OCLC 43064526	Attested through at least 1973.
Pensacola	Pensacola Times	1888	1888			Briefly edited by W.H. Mixon between the closure of the Pensacola Enterprise and his return to Alabama.
Pensacola	The Pensacola Voice; The Gulf Coast Voice	1965 or 1973?	2018	Weekly	OCLC 10900452	Founded by Les Humphrey.
Progress Village	Progress Village Pioneer	1961	1900s	Monthly newspaper	LCCN sn97027614; OCLC 36923623	Managed by A.D. Gaither.; Attested through 1962.
Sarasota	The Bulletin	1959	?	Weekly	LCCN sn99063206; OCLC 27428311	Published by Fred L. Bacon.
Sarasota	Tempo News	1986	current			Official site
St. Augustine	Saint Augustine Post	1933	1900s	Weekly	LCCN sn95047464; OCLC 33974465	Edited by James G. Reddick.
St. Petersburg / Louisville, Kentucky (1978–1980) / Gainesville (1980–1981) / Oakland, California (1981–1986)	Burning Spear	1969 or 1970	?	Irregular	LCCN sn94093039, 2019227495, sn92060463; OCLC 1128813751, 26269659, 32781943	Published by the African People's Socialist Party from 1973 to 1986.
St. Petersburg	The Weekly Challenger; Tri-county Challenger	1966	current	Weekly	LCCN sn97027693; OCLC 1670430; Tri-county Challenger: LCCN sn96027434; OCLC 34953982	Official site
St. Petersburg	The Pinellas Negro Weekly	1944	1900s	Weekly	LCCN sn97027641; OCLC 36923922	Edited by T.L.L. Sherman.
St. Petersburg	Public Informer	1937	?			
St. Petersburg	World	1930s?	1930s?			
Tallahassee	Capital Outlook	1975	current	Weekly	LCCN sn96027395; OCLC 27030813	Official site; Published by Sharon Woodson.
Tallahassee	The Front	1900s	1970s	Bimonthly newspaper	LCCN sn94023067; OCLC 29604957	Attested from 1971.
Tallahassee	Haiti Espoir Magazine	1994	?	Monthly	OCLC 30719485	Published by Mireille L. Denis. Edited by Jean Beaudouin.
Tallahassee	Metropolitan	1920s?	1920s?			
Tallahassee	Record-Dispatch	1947	?			Circulation of 2000 in 1940s.
Tampa	Afro-American Monthly	1915	?	Monthly newspaper		
Tampa	The Black Journal	1988	?	Biweekly	LCCN sn97027601; OCLC 36921841	Published by David Henderson, II.
Tampa	Tampa Bulletin; The Tampa Bulletin	1914	1959	Weekly	LCCN sn91066458; OCLC 23660655	Edited by Marcellus D. Potter.; Circulation of 6000 in 1920s.
Tampa	Florida Sentinel-Bulletin	1945	?	Twice weekly		Published by Cyril Blythe Andrews Jr.
Tampa	The Tampa Guardian	1873	1886	Weekly	LCCN sn84022831; OCLC 10588271	Edited by J.T. Magbee and J.A. Magbee from 1874 to 1885.; Published by H.J. Cooper and C.H. Baxter from 1885 to 1886.
Tampa	The News Reporter	1957?	?	Weekly		Published by James A. Jackson.
Tampa	Florida Sentinel Bulletin	1959	current	Twice weekly	LCCN sn82014285, sn96027423; OCLC 34845852, 8790205	Official site
Tampa	Florida Sentinel	1945	1950s	Weekly	LCCN sn95047463; OCLC 33974451	Edited by C. Blythe Andrews.
Tampa	Southern Progress	1886	?			Tampa's first African American newspaper.
West Palm Beach	Florida Photo News	1956?	?	Weekly	OCLC 26175253	Edited by M.A. Hall Williams from 1987 to 1990, and then by Yasmin R. Cooper.
West Palm Beach	Markethhouse Internationale	1992?	?	Monthly newspaper	OCLC 30770827	Haitian-American newspaper.; Edited by Ken Anderson and Vincent Lawson.; Attested from 1993.
West Palm Beach	Palm Beach Gazette	1989	?	Weekly	LCCN sn97003875; OCLC 27248531; ISSN 1093-5762	Edited by Lee Ivory.
Winter Park	Winter Park Advocate	1885 or 1889	1891?			Founded by Gus C. Henderson.
Winter Park	The Recorder; The Florida Recorder; The Florida Christian Recorder	1891	1915			Founded by Gus C. Henderson.

== See also ==
- List of African American newspapers and media outlets
- List of African American newspapers in Alabama
- List of African American newspapers in Georgia
- List of newspapers in Florida

== Works cited ==
- Danky, James Philip; Hady, Maureen E., eds. (1998). African-American newspapers and periodicals : a national bibliography. Harvard University Press. ISBN 9780674007888.
- Shedden, David (2019). "Florida Newspaper Chronology, 1783-2001" (PDF). Digital USFSP. University of South Florida St. Petersburg. S2CID 165459724. Archived from the original (PDF) on February 11, 2020.
- Shofner, Jerrell H. (1983). "Florida". In Suggs, Henry Lewis (ed.). The Black Press in the South, 1865–1979. ISBN 9780313222443.
