= Central Avenue =

Central Avenue may refer to:

== Roads ==
=== United States ===
- Central Avenue (Albany, New York) in Albany, New York
- Central Avenue (Albuquerque, New Mexico) in Albuquerque, New Mexico, part of Historic Route 66
- Central Avenue (Augusta, Georgia), in Augusta, Georgia
- Central Avenue (Baltimore) in Baltimore, Maryland
- Central Avenue (Hudson Palisades), New Jersey
- Central Avenue (Los Angeles) in Los Angeles, California
- Central Avenue (Tampa) in Tampa, Florida
- Central Avenue Historic District (Hot Springs, Arkansas)
- New York State Route 100 from southern tip of the route to White Plains, in Westchester County, New York
- Minnesota State Highway 65 is known as Central Avenue in Minneapolis and some northern suburbs
- Central Avenue Corridor in Phoenix, Arizona
- Jerome Avenue, called Central Avenue in its earlier days starting from the Central Bridge in The Bronx, New York

=== India ===
- Central Avenue, or Chittaranjan Avenue, in Kolkata,

== Rail stations ==
- Central Avenue station (BMT Myrtle Avenue Line), an elevated rapid transit station in Brooklyn, New York
- Central Avenue (LIRR Atlantic Branch station), the former name of the Laurelton commuter rail station in Queens, New York

== Other uses ==
- "Central Avenue" (song), a 2012 song by Bobby Womack
