= C. Blythe Andrews Jr. Public Library =

C. Blyth Andrews Jr. Public Library
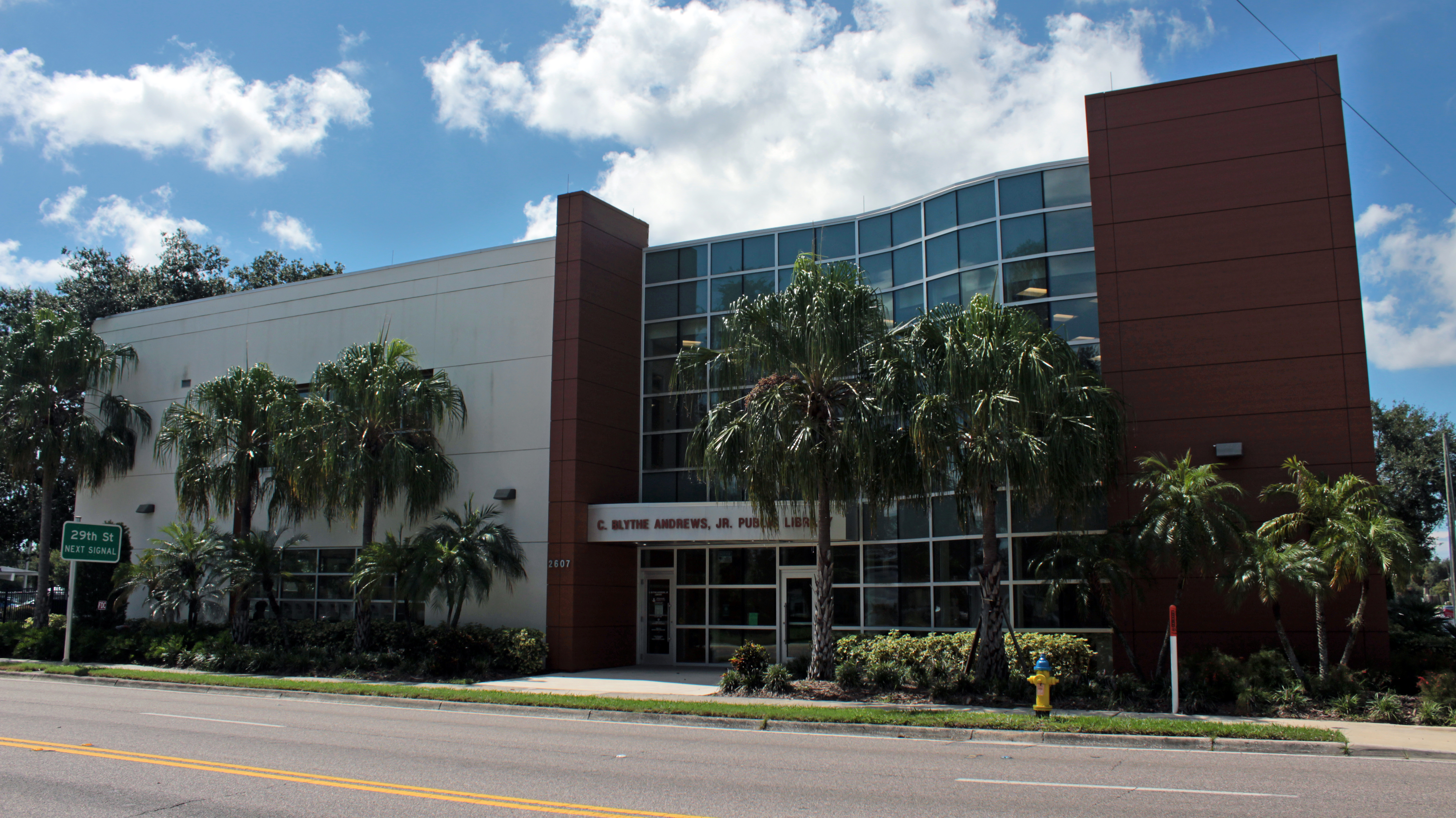
- Exterior of the library in 2026
- Former names: College Hill Public Library

General information
- Location: Tampa, Florida, 2607 E. Dr. MLK Jr. Blvd. Tampa, Florida 33610
- Coordinates: 27.981177°N 82.430387°W
- Opened: 1994

Website
- hcplc.org/locations/c-blythe-andrews-jr

The C. Blythe Andrews Jr. Public Library, formerly known as the College Hill Branch Library, is located at 2607 E. Dr. MLK Jr. Blvd., Tampa, Florida, United States. The 8,500 sq. foot facility was renamed in 2011 for Florida Sentinel Bulletin owner and publisher C. Blythe Andrews. It is part of the Tampa–Hillsborough County Public Library System (THPL), and is a member of the Hillsborough County Public Library Cooperative (HCPLC).

== History ==
The library first opened to the public as the College Hill Public Library on June 16, 1989, in an 800 square foot double-wide trailer. The current building opened in 1994 and, in 2010, was renamed after C. Blythe Andrews Jr., a publisher of the Florida Sentinel Bulletin, a newspaper serving the African American community.

== Future plans ==
At 8,500 square feet, the previous library building was considered too small for the number of patrons it was receiving.

The C. Blythe Andrews Jr. Public Library closed on April 15, 2017, so that work could start on the construction of a new, larger library to better assist the needs of the community. It re-opened in 2019.

== Amenities ==
The library offers books, audiobooks, music CDs, magazines, and DVDs. Internet access is available through computers and WiFi. A large community room and a small meeting room are available for public use. The full suite of Adobe Creative Cloud desktop apps is also available for members to use by booking ahead and on a walk-in basis.

== Friends of the Library ==
The C. Blythe Andrews Jr. Public Library receives support from the Ada T. Payne Friends of the Urban Libraries group. Their fundraising efforts support not only this branch, but also the Robert W. Saunders Sr. Public Library and the West Tampa Branch Library. The Ada. T Payne friends have bookstores in all three of these libraries.

== Art ==
The library features two lithographs in the main reading room area: No Place Like Home (1990) by artist Louis Delsarte; and With Honors (1989) by artist Synthia St. James. Twenty-one Burgert Brothers' black-and-white photograph reproductions are included in the library's art collection.

== Special collections ==
The Florida Sentinel Bulletin collection's history began in the early 1900s. In 1919, C. Blythe Andrews Sr.'s father, William W. Andrews, created the Florida Sentinel newspaper in Jacksonville. The newspaper closed during the Great Depression, but was revived by C. Blythe Andrews Sr. in 1945 in Tampa. He purchased the Tampa Bulletin in 1959, eventually combining both papers into what is now the Florida Sentinel Bulletin. Andrews Sr. remained the publisher of the newly merged papers until 1976; his son, C. Blythe Andrews Jr., became the editor in chief after his father's death in 1977. After twenty years, Andrews Jr. turned ownership over to his daughter S. Kay Andrews and his son C. Blythe III in December of 1996.

The Bulletin serves the local community as the only African-American publication in Florida to publish twice a week, owning all of their printing equipment.

Much later, in May of 2019, the organization began the hard work of transferring 118 bound volumes spanning the years of 1945 to 2010 to the C. Blythe Andrews Jr. Public Library's special collection for the Bulletin. This involved long-term preservation and digitization efforts. The collection consists of the Florida Sentinel Bulletin newspaper bound volumes (1945-2010) and microfilm (1947-2008), the reference collection, 95 bound volumes of Ebony magazine (1968-2015) and microfilm (1945-1991), and Jet magazine (1979-1985).
