= Edwin Osgood Grover =

American publisher and educator

Edwin Osgood Grover (June 4, 1870 – November 8, 1965) was an American publisher and educator whose contributions to Rollins College enhanced its standing and reputation during his twenty-year tenure. He was active in the Winter Park, Florida, community and made significant contributions to the African-American community and to the creation of Mead Garden.

== Early life and education ==
Edwin Grover was born in Mantorville, Minnesota, on June 4, 1870, and grew up in New England, where his father was a Congregational minister. He graduated from St. Johnsbury Academy in Vermont and worked his way through Dartmouth College, where he played football as a freshman and ran track for all four years. He wrote articles for The Boston Globe and edited the Dartmouth literary magazine for his last two years at the college.

Because of his friendship with the poet, Richard Hovey, who published "Men of Dartmouth", Grover edited Hovey's "Dartmouth Lyrics" and later edited the popular favorite, "The Dartmouth Song Book."

Graduating from Dartmouth in 1894, Grover attended Harvard briefly, but soon left to "see the world." He traveled around Europe and the Middle East on tramp steamers for nine months, boasting that he spent less than $400 on the whole adventure.

== Career ==
Returning from his travels, he went to work as a salesman for Ginn and Company. Transferred to Chicago after a few years, he went to work for Rand McNally and soon started his own company, Prang Co., which specialized in painting materials and books.

In 1926, he was appointed Professor of Books at Rollins College, in Winter Park, Florida. Ralph Waldo Emerson had proposed such a position in an essay in 1856, and Hamilton Holt made this his first appointment after becoming president of Rollins in 1925. Grover taught courses on Recreational Reading, The History of the Book, and Literary Personalities. He established the first bookstore in Winter Park, The Bookery, and began a publishing venture, The Angel Alley Press. His first publication was "Psyche's Lamp," a collection of poems by Rose Mills Power. The following year, he published a collection of works by 22 Rollins poets and began a series of pamphlets which he called "Vest Pocket Poems."

Professor Grover assumed many positions at Rollins. He served as Director of Libraries (1927–1929). In this capacity he attracted a number of special collections, most notably a considerable collection of material by and about Walt Whitman. With Hamilton Holt he began "The Animated Magazine," which he served as publisher for twenty years. He was vice-president of Rollins from 1938 to 1951.

His sister, Eulalie Grover, was the author of many children's books, including the "Sunbonnet" and "Overall" series. Her books sold over four million copies.

Grover retired from the Rollins faculty in 1947.

== Community activities ==
In addition to his many contributions to Rollins College, he was active in the First Congregational Church of Winter Park and, with his wife Mertie, established the Welbourne Day Nursery for the children of working African-American mothers. When his wife died in an automobile accident in 1936, he invited "flower gifts" in the form of contributions to the Hannibal Square Library. This led to the formation of the Hannibal Square Associates and the building of the first community center on the West Side of Winter Park. He also raised money for the DePugh Nursing Home.

His final gift to the community was putting together the land for Mead Garden. These forty-five acres continue to be a natural environment for nature enjoyment and study.
