= Scrub Neighborhood, Tampa =

The Scrub
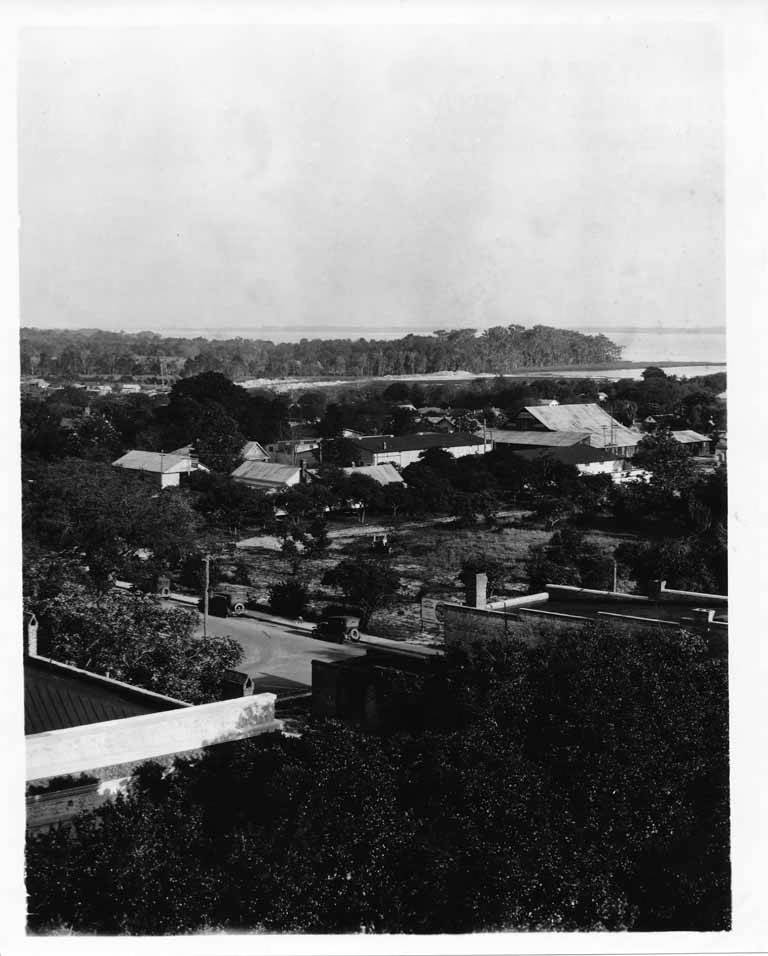
- Aerial view of the Scrub neighborhood, Tampa, Florida
- Interactive map of the Scrub
- Coordinates: 27.955306°N 82.454990°W
- Country: United States
- State: Florida
- County: Hillsborough
- City: Tampa
- Time zone: UTC-5 (Eastern)
  - Summer (DST): UTC-4 (Eastern)

The Scrub was a majority-Black neighborhood and central business district located in Tampa, Florida, United States. It is bounded on the west by North Orange Avenue, on the north by East Palm Avenue, on the east by Nuccio Parkway, and on the south by East Cass Street. Created after the U.S. Civil War, the Black business district existed until the 1950s when it was razed for a public housing project and then again in the 1970s for the construction of I-4 and I-275. Central Avenue was the center of the neighborhood where a variety of black-owned businesses resided.

== History ==
The Scrub neighborhood started when newly freed enslaved people settled in a scrub palmetto thicket to the northeast of Tampa. This population grew when Henry B. Plant expanded his railway and steamship lines to Tampa with the Plant System. Central Avenue became the economic heart of the area. By 1895, there were seventeen Black-owned businesses on Central Avenue. In 1899, there were fifty-six businesses in the neighborhood with nineteen on Central Avenue. The area continued to grow throughout the early 20th century, coming to house Tampa's first Black newspaper, The Florida Reporter.

The Scrub and the Central Avenue business district had a variety of businesses within it. These included several properties owned by Isaac Gardner such as the Pyramid Hotel at the corner of Central Avenue and Harrison Street and the Palace Drugstore at the corner of Central Avenue and Scott Street. Although disputed, it is claimed that Ray Charles wrote and recorded his first four songs in the Scrub area in 1947. From its founding in Tampa in 1959 by C. Blythe Andrews, until 1962 when it moved to Ybor City, the Scrub was also home to the Black newspaper the Florida Sentinel Bulletin.

In 1954, much of the Scrub neighborhood was razed for a public housing project, Central Park Village, to be managed by the Tampa Housing Authority. In 1959, construction of the interstates 4 and 275 displaced many of the remaining residents. By the time of the 1967 Tampa Riots, the Scrub was mostly abandoned with the last remaining business along Central Avenue closing in 1974.

The Tampa City Council adopted the Central Park Community Redevelopment Plan in 2006 in order to encourage growth in the neighborhood. It included a mixed-income development called Encore Tampa, four of the buildings are administered by the Tampa Housing Authority. Encore opened in 2012. Perry Harvey Sr. Park opened in March 2016 on Central Avenue with sculptures, timeline pavers, statues, basketball courts, and other features to honor the history of the Scrub neighborhood. On its north end, it includes what is referred to as the "Bro Bowl," one of the last remaining skateparks from the 1970s in Tampa, and the first skatepark to be registered on the National Register of Historic Places. Also in the neighborhood is Meacham Urban Farm, an urban regenerative farm.

On June 17, 2024, the Tampa Bay History Center and the Tampa Housing Authority announced the creation of Tampa's Black History Museum to be located at the historic St. James Episcopal Church. It is projected to open on Juneteenth, June 19, 2026.
