= Hannibal Square Library =

Former library in Winter Park, Florida

Coordinates: 28.5959°N 81.3579°W

Hannibal Square Library was a library established to serve the Black community in Winter Park, Florida that operated from 1937 to 1979. In 1881, the Hannibal Square neighborhood was built to house to Black families who worked for white residents and visitors and in the railroad or service industry. In 1936, Mertie Graham Grover, a former teacher, was hit by a car and killed in Winter Park. Her husband, Rollins College professor Dr. Edwin O. Grover, started a fund to build a library in her memory in the Hannibal Square neighborhood that would serve the Black residents who were barred by segregation laws from using the county library. Dr. Grover was Professor of Books and taught classes on reading and literature and later started his own publishing company, the Angel Alley Press. He was also instrumental in gaining the land for the future Mead Botanical Garden.

The Hannibal Square Library collection began with the purchase of 100 books and was initially kept in the Colored Day Nursery and later in the local elementary school. As resources and funds were assembled for the construction of the library, a non-profit called Hannibal Square Associates was formed. Their objectives were “to establish, own and operate a public library; to own and develop a recreation center and any other enterprise for the social and civic betterment of the Negro population of Winter Park, Florida; and to promote and encourage education and the attendance of the Negro population of the City of Winter Park at institutions of higher learning; to cultivate the artistic, scientific and literary tastes and aspirations of the Negro population of the City of Winter Park.” In 1936 prior to the construction of the dedicated library building, funds for the library were half provided by the community. The Orlando Sentinel donated a number of books to the children's collection.

The Hannibal Square Public Library-Mertie Graham Grover Memorial was built on the north side of West New England Avenue near Pennsylvania Avenue, next to the Black elementary school. It opened on July 1, 1937, at a cost of $1,100. Initially it was open Mondays, Wednesdays, and Saturdays from 4-6 pm and 7-9 pm. The library hosted a variety of local clubs and organizations over the years, including the Boy Scouts, Benevolent Society and Colored Women's Club (also known as the Ideal Woman's Club). In the 1950s, the library began to receive some funding from the city, although less than the public library received. In 1955, a children's room was added, funded with donations of time, labor and money. In 1962 and 1963, the Winter Park Public Library changed its policies to allow all residents, regardless of race, to access its library services.

In 1968 Hannibal Square Associates was dissolved with its assets distributed to the Winter Park Library Association and resulted in the consolidation of the Hannibal Square Library into the Winter Park Public Library system, which was formally founded in 1902. In 1979, the Hannibal Square library closed when the 460 East New England Avenue library opened. The Hannibal Square building was moved to a place behind the Winter Park Community Center.
