= New Era (Florida newspaper) =

Newspaper from Gainesville, Florida, US (1865–c. 1874)

The New Era was a weekly newspaper published in Gainesville, Florida. It was established in 1865 during the Reconstruction era, and in 1873 the newspaper was purchased and became the first Black newspaper in Florida. It closed around a year later in 1874.

== History ==
The New Era was a newspaper was founded in July 1865, as a White newspaper. W. H. Robertson was the founding publisher. By 1870, M. E. Papy was the editor and publisher of the New Era. Papy was also an Inspector of Elections in Alachua County.

The formerly newspaper was purchased by African American politician Josiah T. Walls in September 1873, and it supported Walls renomination. Reportedly, "Hon. J. T. Walls, who will hereafter publish it. Mr. A. B. Kelley has assumed the editorial management." It praised Walls, and stated a preference for him over the White Republican Party incumbent Charles Memorial Hamilton. After the changes in ownership, it is noted as the earliest Black-owned newspaper in Florida.

== See also ==
- List of African American newspapers in Florida
- The Gainesville Times, predecessor of The Gainesville Sun
