= The Daytona Times =

Weekly newspaper in Florida

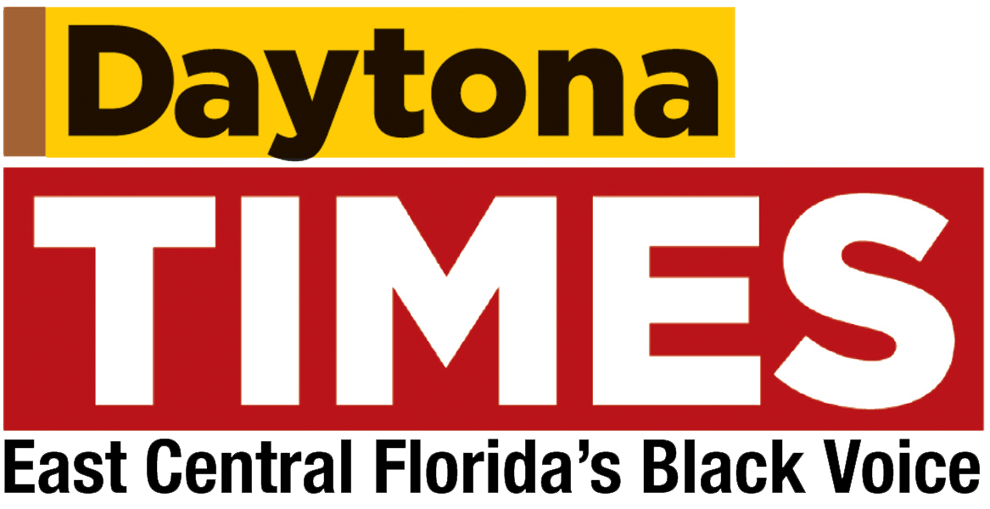
- Type: Weekly newspaper
- Owner(s): Charles Cherry II and Glenn Cherry
- Founder: Charles W. Cherry Sr.
- Founded: August 1978
- Headquarters: Daytona Beach, Florida
- Country: United States
- Circulation: 25,000
- OCLC number: 27019747
- Website: daytonatimes.com

The Daytona Times is a Florida weekly black newspaper serving Volusia and Flagler counties.

== History ==
In 1969, Charles W. Cherry Sr., a Bethune–Cookman University professor, entrepreneur, civil rights activist, and later president of the Florida NAACP, founded the Daytona Beach’s Westside Rapper, a weekly newspaper serving the African American community in Daytona Beach.

In August 1978, the Westside Rapper was succeeded by The Daytona Times, as "The Black Voice of East Central Florida".

Following Cherry's death in 2004, his two sons, Charles Cherry II and Glenn Cherry, took over the publication of The Daytona Times.

Former NAACP president and 2018 Maryland gubernatorial candidate Ben Jealous has been a contributing editor for The Daytona Times.

The paper is a member of the National Newspaper Publishers Association (NNPA), a trade group of more than 200 Black-owned media companies in the United States.

== See also ==
- African American newspapers
- List of newspapers in Florida
- List of African American newspapers in Florida
