= Loring Augustus Chase =

Loring Augustus Chase (July 1, 1839, in Nashua, New Hampshire – August 21, 1906) was a cofounder of Winter Park, Florida as one of the incorporators of the Winter Park Company. He is listed as a Great Floridian.

Born to Otis Nelson Chase and Joanna (Colburn) Chase, Loring Chase became an orphan at the age of two after his mother died on May 4, 1841, and after his father died on August 6, 1841. He was sent to live with his uncle Albert M. Chase and his aunt Mary in Canton, Massachusetts. In October 1862, Loring Chase enlisted in a Massachusetts regiment and served nine months in a North Carolina camp during the U.S. Civil War. He was honorably discharged in June 1863, returned to Canton, Massachusetts, and became a bookkeeper for a wholesale firm in Boston.

On December 6, 1864, Chase arrived in Chicago and worked as a bookkeeper at the first National Bank. He enrolled in the Bryant & Stratton Business College and entered Illinois State Normal University. He worked as a real estate broker, teacher at Bryant & Stratton, and with the Pantagraph Stationary Co. He visited Winter Park, Florida, for health issues and "fell in love with the landscape and climate."

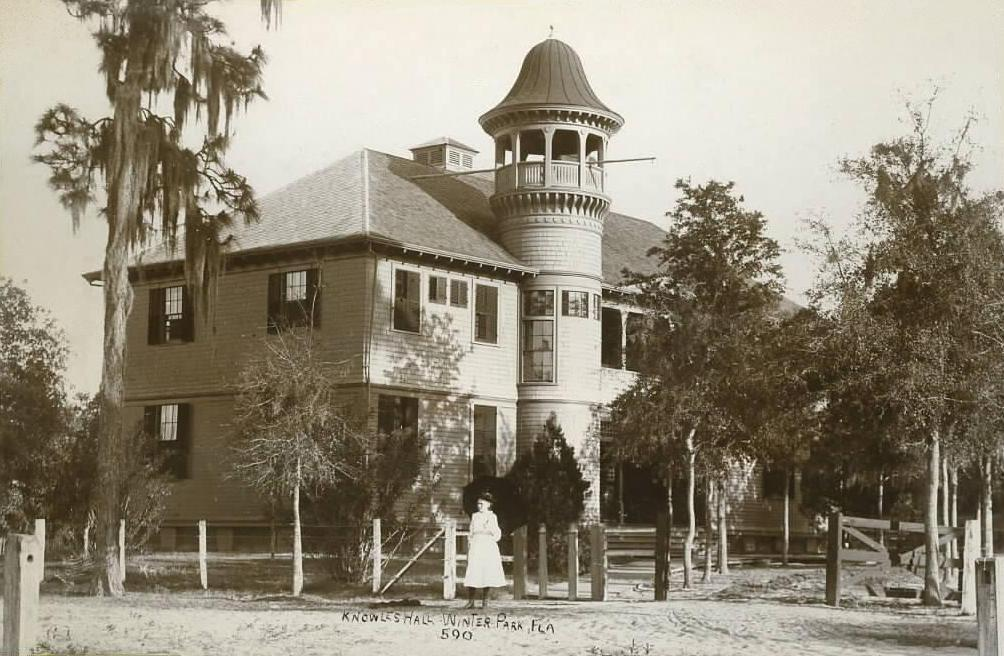
Knowles Hall at Rollins College

In 1881, he purchased six hundred acres of land with his lifelong friend Oliver Everett Chapman and set out establishing a new town. He also supervised the construction of the Seminole Hotel (1886) and Knowles Hall at Rollins College. Loring's incorporation plan was supported by Gus C. Henderson who assisted with the city's establishment with the inclusion of Hanibal Square. He encouraged black residents to vote for the plan.

== Additional sources ==
- John Williston Cook, “In Memory of Loring Augustus Chase: One Of The Founders Of Winter Park, Addresses and Letters.” (Rollins College, 1907)
- Seminole, Winter Park, Fla. Winter Park, Fl: Winter Park Co., 1887.
- “Contentdm Collection,” Rollins College Archives, 16 June 2006, Contendm Collection
