= The Tampa Bulletin =

Historic African American newspaper

The Tampa Bulletin was a newspaper in Tampa, Florida, for African Americans. It was established by Rev. Marcellus D. Potter in 1915. According to the Library of Congress, it began in 1914.

M.D. Potter was the editor and owner. Potter was born in Sylvester, Georgia. Potter Elementary, an elementary school in Tampa, is named for him. Potter was Vice-President of the Central Life Insurance Company.

C. Blythe Andrews moved to Tampa and worked at the paper after the Sentinel folded. He revived the Sentinel. After a dispute over coverage of lodges he left the paper and revived the Florida Sentinel in December 1945.

In 1959 the paper was merged into C. Blythe Andrews' Florida Sentinel.

== See also ==
- List of African American newspapers in Florida
