= WPRK =

Coordinates: 28°35′41″N 81°20′06″W

- Winter Park, Florida; United States
- Frequency: 91.5 MHz
- Branding: "Voice of Rollins College"

Programming
- Format: college radio

Ownership
- Owner: Rollins College

History
- Call sign meaning: Winter PaRK

Technical information
- Licensing authority: FCC
- Facility ID: 57473
- Class: A
- ERP: 1,300 watts
- HAAT: 32 meters (105 ft)

Links
- Public license information: Public file; LMS
- Website: wprk.org

WPRK 91.5 FM is a non-commercial college radio station located in Winter Park, Florida, United States. It is owned and operated by Rollins College. Its signal is audible in most of the Orlando metropolitan area. WPRK features programming from nearly every mainstream and non-mainstream music genre.

== History ==
WPRK began broadcasting on December 8, 1952, with a dedication address from then President-Elect Dwight D. Eisenhower. The station originally operated on 88.1 MHz with 10 watts of power but eventually moved to 91.5 MHz and increased to 1,300 watts effective radiated power.

During its first decade of broadcasting WPRK operated for approximately five hours every evening, transmitting a variety of material including classical music, interview programs, quiz shows, and occasional live broadcasts of concerts and speeches occurring on campus. The hours of operation gradually expanded. By the mid-1970s WPRK was typically on the air from noon to midnight, featuring classical music during the day, a variety of student-selected radio formats at night, and live play-by-play coverage of selected Rollins soccer and basketball games.

In 1989 students were given more authority over the programming and operation of WPRK; by 1991 the station was described as "completely student-run." The amount of time allocated to classical music was reduced and the length of the broadcast day was expanded, with the station operating from 8 am to 2 am daily. Consistent 24-hour broadcasting began in the mid-1990s.

In the summer of 2000, Community Communications, owner of WMFE-FM 90.7, offered to take over the operations of WPRK in a proposed partnership which greatly interested the college. Students, listeners and other supporters formed an organization called "SaveWPRK.com" to oppose the merger and find other sources of funding for the station. On February 1, 2001, the Rollins College administration announced its decision to retain control of WPRK.

From January 17–21, 2005, the station launched its first WPRK Marathon, also known as the 110-Hour Marathon, a fundraiser in which DJ Dave Plotkin attempted to break the world record for longest consecutive on-air DJ session.

Following Hurricane Irma on September 10, 2017, WPRK's antenna sustained serious damage that caused for the removal of the antenna. From September 2017 till August 2018, the station continued to offer their programming as a streaming service. In August 2018, WPRK went back on air and once again broadcast on FM. In January 2020 the station was moved to its current studio in the renovated Kathleen W. Rollins Hall.

== Notable alumni DJs ==
- Diplo
- Drew Garabo
- Gen from the Genitorturers
- Q Burns Abstract Message
- Chris "Mad Dog" Russo

== See also ==
- Campus radio
- List of college radio stations in the United States
