= Edward P. Hooker =

Edward Payson Hooker was a Congregationalist Minister, an alum of Middlebury College, and the first president of Rollins College and served in that role from the schools inception in 1885 until 1892.

== Founding of Rollins ==
Hooker played many important roles in the founding of Rollins. Originally from Massachusetts and having moved to Winter Park in hopes of benefitting from the warmer climate, Hooker was chosen by the Florida Congregational Association to assess the state of education in Florida. This assessment led to the Congregationalist Church to promote the foundation of what would become Florida's first institution of higher learning, whose location was chosen by a committee of five Floridian men, including Hooker himself. Winter Park was chosen as the site of the school, and Hooker was named president of the faculty.

== Time at Rollins ==
Hooker was during his time at Rollins a teacher, trustee, pastor, and president. he taught classes in multiple subjects and was known to be a cheery man by students. he resigned from his role as president due to health concerns.
