= Knowles Memorial Chapel =

United States historic place at Rollins College, Winter Park, Florida

- U.S. National Register of Historic Places
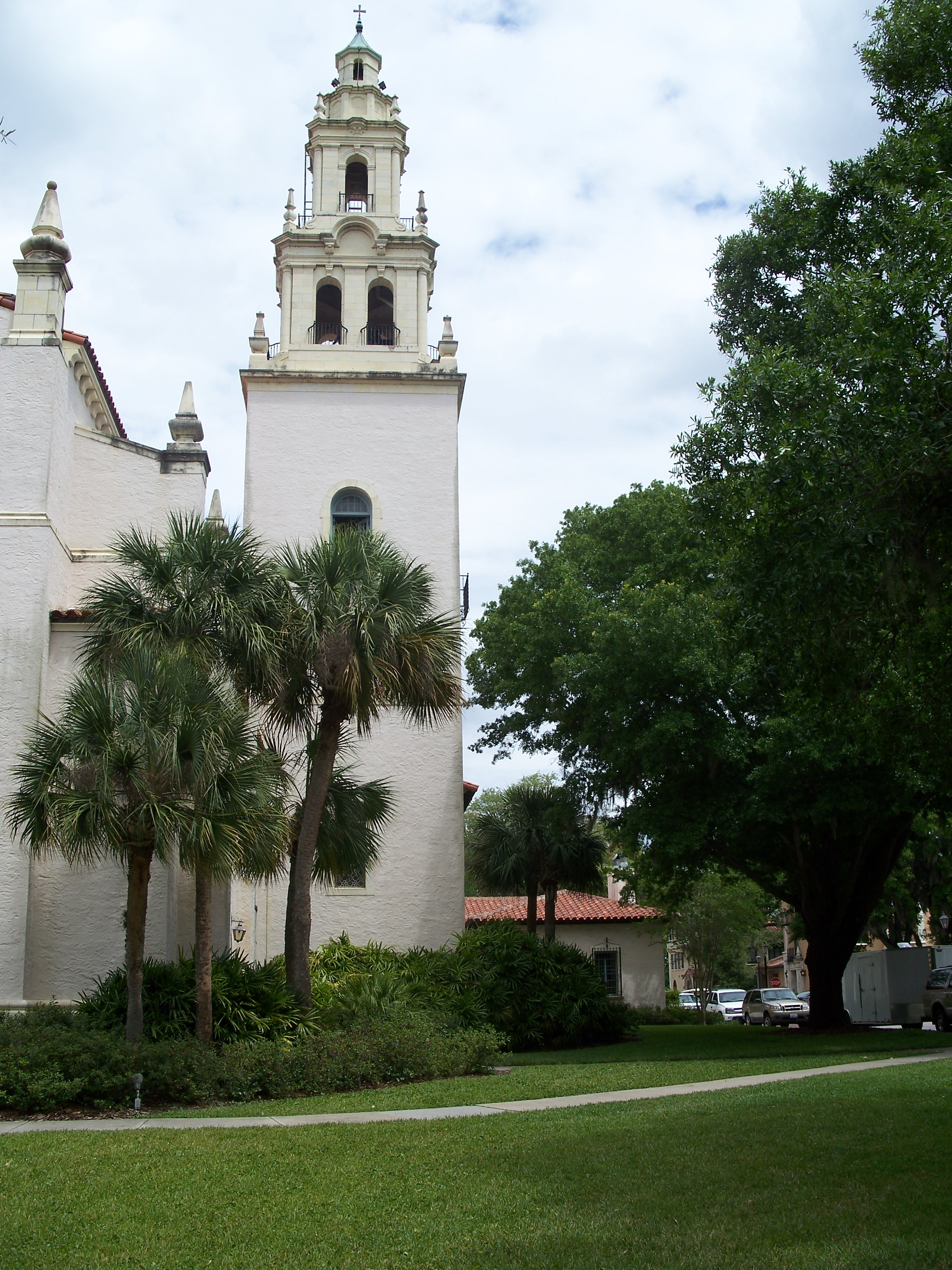
- Knowles Chapel tower

- Location within Florida Location within the United States
- Location: Rollins College; Winter Park, Florida
- Nearest city: Winter Park
- Coordinates: 28°35′33″N 81°20′53″W
- Area: less than one acre
- Built: 1932
- Architect: Ralph Adams Cram and builder, G. W. Hessler of Jacksonville
- Architectural style: Mediterranean Revival
- NRHP reference No.: 97001448
- Added to NRHP: December 8, 1997

Knowles Memorial Chapel, built between 1931 and 1932, is an historic Mediterranean Revival building located on the campus of Rollins College in Winter Park, Florida, in the United States. On December 8, 1997, it was added to the National Register of Historic Places. On April 18, 2012, the AIA's Florida Chapter placed the Knowles Chapel at Rollins College on its list of Florida Architecture: 100 Years. 100 Places.

== History ==
Knowles Memorial Chapel was given to Rollins College by Frances Knowles Warren in memory of her father, Francis Bangs Knowles (1823–1890), one of the founders of both Rollins College and the city of Winter Park. It was designed by church and collegiate architect, Ralph Adams Cram, who considered it his favorite of the more than 75 churches and cathedrals he had designed. In the summer of 2007 it underwent a masonry restoration paid for by a trust set up by Frances Knowles Warren.

=== Organ ===
The chapel organ was built in 1932 by organ builder, Ernest M. Skinner. In the mid 1950s it was renovated by Skinner's firm, Aeolian-Skinner. Between 1999 and 2002 the organ was completely overhauled and renovated by Randall Dyer & Associates. At the same time the Dyer firm also built and installed a "completely new, free-standing antiphonal organ at the rear of the balcony and surrounding the Rose Window." Deeply involved in the work by the Dyer firm was its associate, John J. Tyrrell, former president of Aeolian-Skinner.

=== Stained Glass ===
The rose window at the rear depicts the seven liberal arts and is a collaboration between Cram and stained-glass artist William Herbert Burnham.

== Current use ==
Knowles Memorial Chapel continues to be used as the Rollins College Chapel and its dean is the pastor of the college. The chapel is also the venue for many musical events, especially during the annual Bach Festival of Winter Park.

== See also ==
- List of Registered Historic Places in Orange County, Florida

== Gallery ==
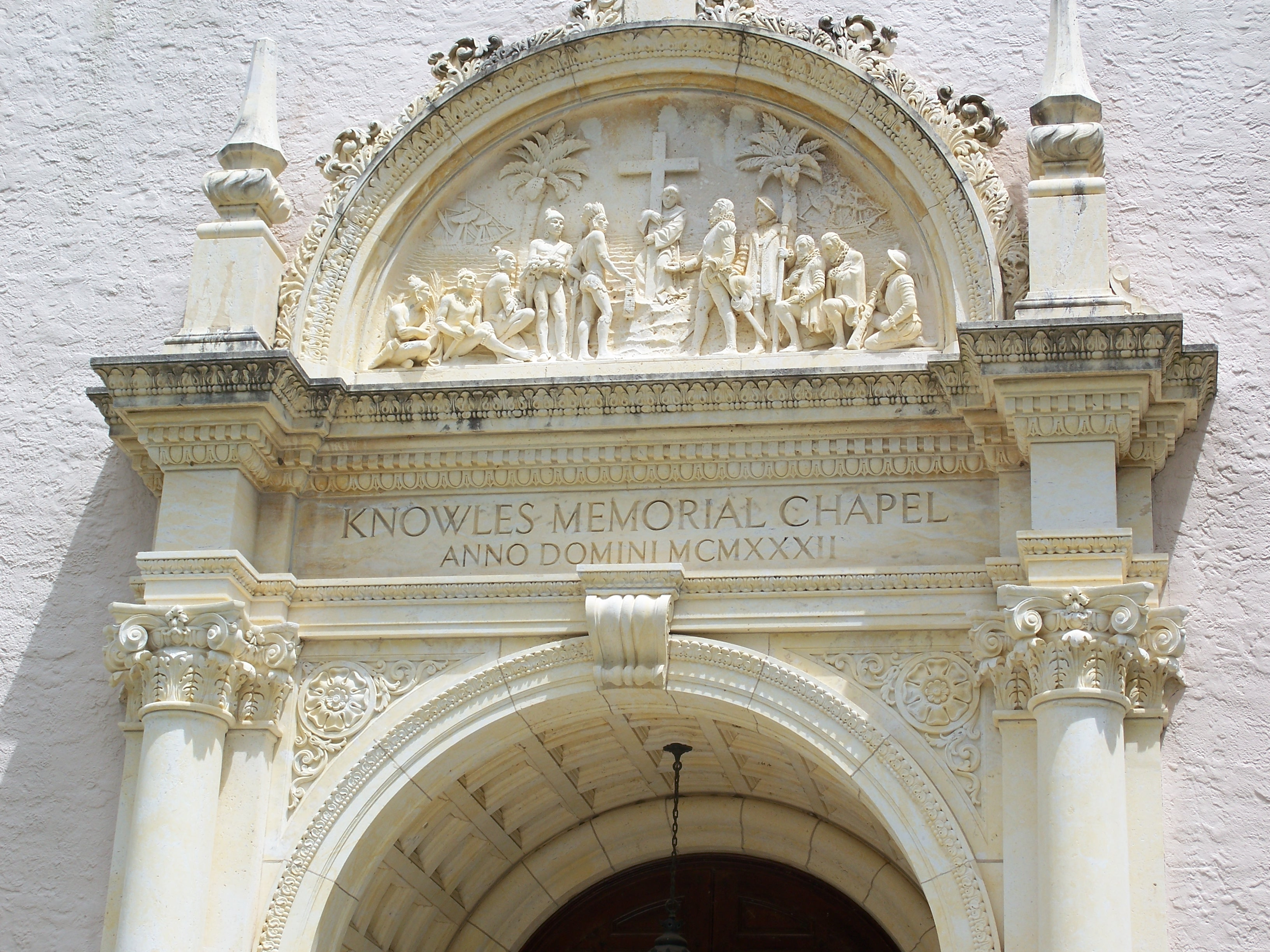
Knowles Chapel detail over entrance

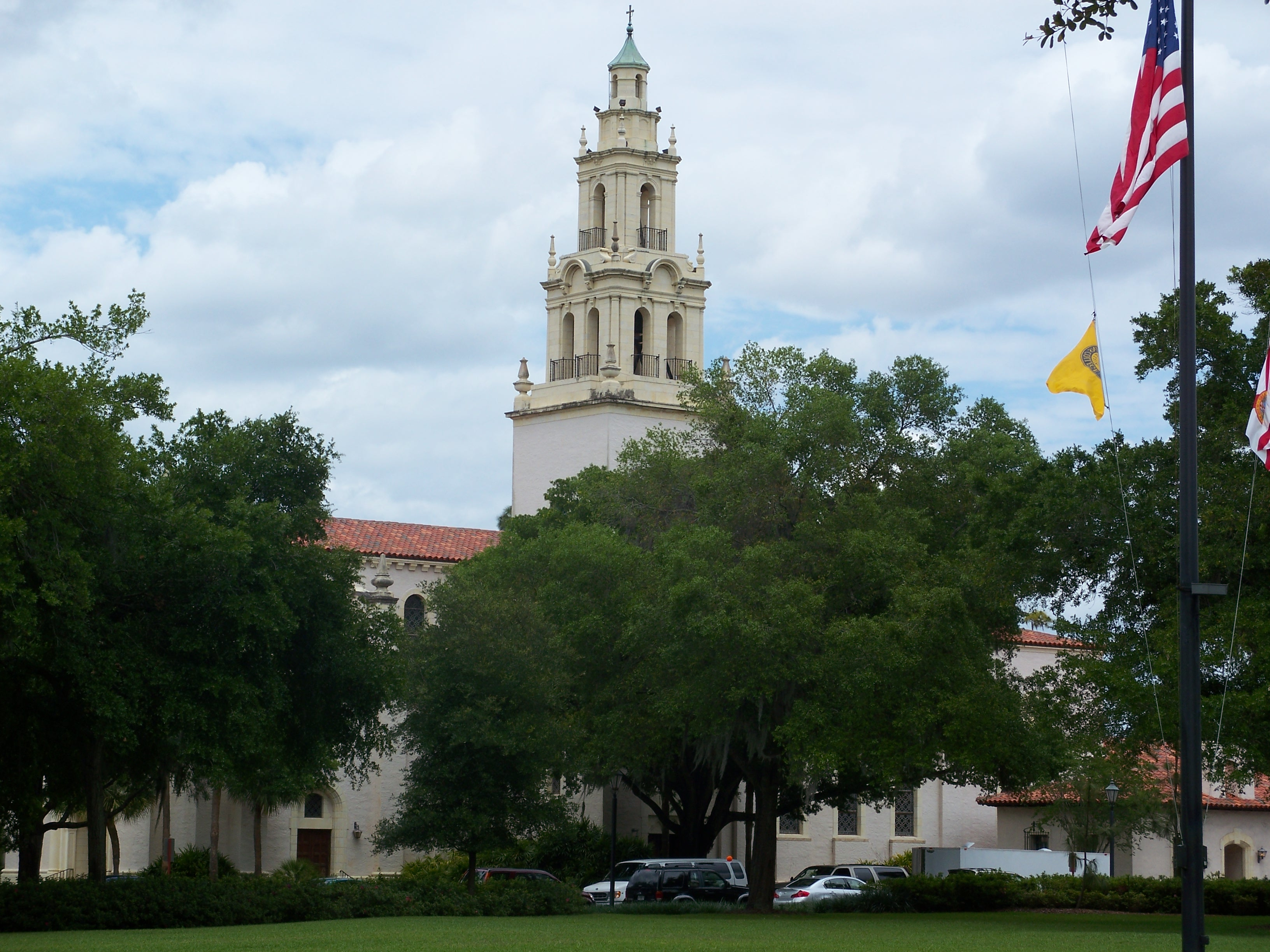
Knowles Chapel side view
