= Winter Park Company =

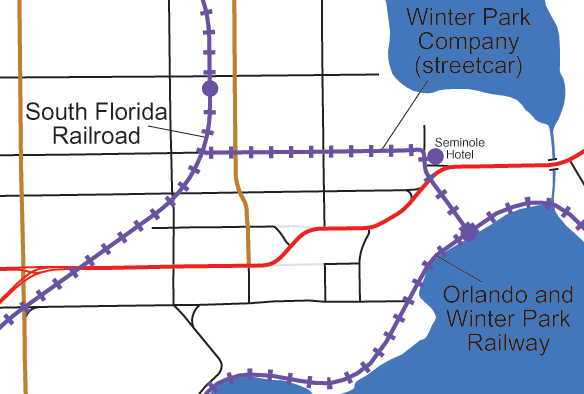
A map of the streetcar line run by the Winter Park Company

The Winter Park Company was incorporated by Florida state law chapter 3669, approved February 6, 1885. It was owned by Loring A. Chase, Olive E. Chapman and J. F. Welborne of Winter Park, Florida, and Orrison S. Marden and Frank G. Webster of Boston, Massachusetts. Among its powers were laying out roads on its property, buying and building hotels, and "the sole and exclusive right to build, equip, maintain and operate a street railway or railways in Winter Park, Orange county, Florida, and for such purpose to use any and all the streets, roads and ways now or in the future there laid out, and it may at any time sell and dispose of such railway or railways, and the equipment thereto belonging, as well as the privilege of operating the same."

The company built a mule-drawn streetcar line, known as the Seminole Hotel Horse Car, along New England Avenue from the Seminole Hotel at the east end of New England Avenue, west to the South Florida Railroad (later Atlantic Coast Line Railroad) station. The tracks were later extended south on Ollie Avenue to the Orlando and Winter Park Railway (later Seaboard Air Line Railroad) station. Tracks were removed in 1903.
