= Florida Sentinel Bulletin =

Newspaper in Tampa, Florida, US

- Type: Biweekly newspaper
- Founder: General William W. Andrews
- Founded: 1919
- Headquarters: 2207 21st Ave Tampa, Fl 33605
- Website: flsentinel.com

The Florida Sentinel Bulletin is a Florida bi-weekly newspaper serving the Tampa Bay Area African-American community.

== History ==
In 1919, General William W. Andrews opened the Florida Sentinel's office in Jacksonville, Florida. Later, the office closed due to the Great Depression. In 1945, General Andrews's son, C. Blythe Andrews, re-opened the Florida Sentinel at 1511 Central Avenue in Tampa, Florida.

In 1959, C. Blythe Andrews bought the Tampa Bulletin newspaper, and merged the two newspapers to make the Florida Sentinel Bulletin. In 1962, the newspaper office was moved to 2207 East 21st Avenue in the Ybor City district of Tampa, Florida. The C. Blythe Andrews Jr. Public Library was named for the publisher.

== See also ==
- List of African American newspapers in Florida
