= Florida Sun-Review =

Weekly African-American newspaper in central Florida

- Type: Weekly newspaper
- Founder(s): H.M. Alexander
- Publisher: James A. Madison
- Founded: 1922
- City: Orlando, Florida
- Website: floridasunreview.com

The Florida Sun-Review is a weekly African-American newspaper in central Florida. It is published in Orlando, with primary distribution points in Orange, Osceola, and Seminoles counties. It was founded in the 1920s and changed ownership in the '30s and again in the '70s. It has used several names, including the Florida Earth, the Sun-Review, and the Sun and Mirror.

== History ==
The newspaper was founded by H.M. Alexander as the Sun in 1922, and published by Jo Lawrence Boden from 1931 to 1975. The Sun acquired the Orlando Mirror around 1950, becoming the Sun and Mirror. It was purchased by James Macon in 1975, who also acquired Orlando Review from James Madison; the paper became the Sun-Review.

== Sources ==
- Danky, James Philip; Hady, Maureen E., eds. (1998). African-American newspapers and periodicals : a national bibliography. Harvard University Press. ISBN 9780674007888.
- Shedden, David (2019). "Florida Newspaper Chronology, 1783-2001" (PDF). Digital USFSP. University of South Florida St. Petersburg. S2CID 165459724. Archived from the original (PDF) on 2020-02-11.
- Shofner, Jerrell H. (1983). "Florida". In Suggs, Henry Lewis (ed.). The Black Press in the South, 1865–1979. ISBN 9780313222443.
