= Seminole Hotel =

Coordinates: 28°35′51″N 81°20′48″W

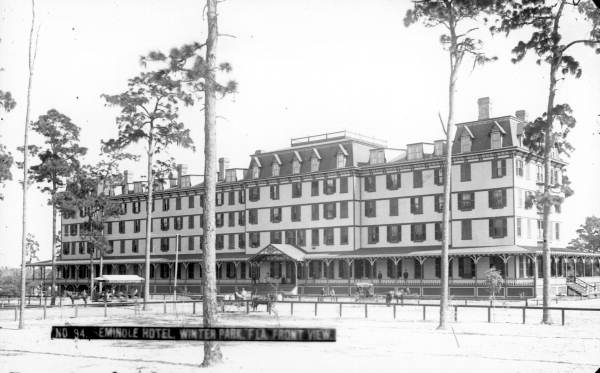
Front view of the Seminole Hotel, Winter Park, Florida, 1880s

The Seminole Hotel was a hotel in Winter Park, Florida. The hotel opened on January 1, 1886, and had 250 guest rooms. It was situated on a site bounded by Osceola Avenue and Lake Osceola and sat at the eastern end of New England Avenue. Many people referred to it as the grand resort of Florida. At that time, wagons, carriages and bicycles were the only common modes of local transportation. The hotel operated its own street railway, the Seminole Hotel Horse-Drawn Car which ran from the South Florida Railroad station up New England Avenue, a distance of approximately ⅓ of a mile to the hotel. A slight extension down Chase/Ollie Avenue from the hotel to the Orlando and Winter Park (AKA: The Dinky Line) Railroad station and dock on Lake Virginia was completed after that railroad opened. Riding the horse-drawn streetcar, hotel guests avoided the bumpy, sandy streets surrounded by posh comforts of velvet, brass and polished native and exotic hardwood finishes. Indeed, all of the streetcars manufactured by the John Stephenson Company in New York City, were state-of-the-art and on the cutting edge of urban transportation development. Many of these passengers came to Winter Park in the winter months to escape the snow and frigid temperatures of the North. In its early years, the hotel was able to attract many wealthy northerners using luxuries such as gaslights and steam heating. The hotel featured a 42 x 100 foot beautiful formal dining room, many parlors, suites with open fireplaces, a barbershop, laundry services, and a 567 foot long colonnaded porch. Guests could take the elevator to view the surrounding area from the promenade on the top of the hotel. For the guests entertainment, the hotel provided a bowling alley, a billiard hall, tennis and croquet grounds, and an orchestra for dancing. Other activities including horseback riding, fishing, and sailing on Lake Osceola in sailboats and steam yachts provided by the hotel.

Along with neighboring Rollins College, the hotel and college brought luxury to the edge of the Florida frontier. The college's opening offered many job opportunities around the Orlando area. For African-Americans living on the west side of Winter Park, this was crucial. Many young African-Americans were able to find jobs at the Seminole Hotel and earn decent wages.

On February 24, 1888, President Grover Cleveland visited the Seminole Hotel, along with Colonel Daniel S. Lamont, Secretary William Collins Whitney, several U.S. senators, and prominent citizens from the nation's capital.

The original Seminole Hotel burned to the ground in September, 1902. In 1912, a second, smaller Seminole Hotel was built. The new hotel was located on East Webster Avenue and sat on the northwest banks of Lake Osceola. This hotel was torn down in 1970.

== Job opportunities for the African-American community ==
The Seminole offered African-Americans many such service jobs. Women could find work at the hotel as maids or cooks, while African-American men were hired as bellhops or baggage carriers.

Many of the employees of the Seminole Hotel who lived in Winter Park year-round acquired other jobs through their connections at the hotel. The majority of the hotel's business came during the winter months, leaving most employees free to seek other jobs during the summer months. Through their association with affluent white hotel guests, local African-Americans procured off-season jobs maintaining gardens and orange crops for the wealthy people who returned north for the summer, leaving their Florida properties in need of maintenance. This was highly beneficial for the African-American families in Winter Park, because with the right connections this guaranteed work all year round.
