= The Winter Park Advocate =

Black newspaper in Winter Park, Florida

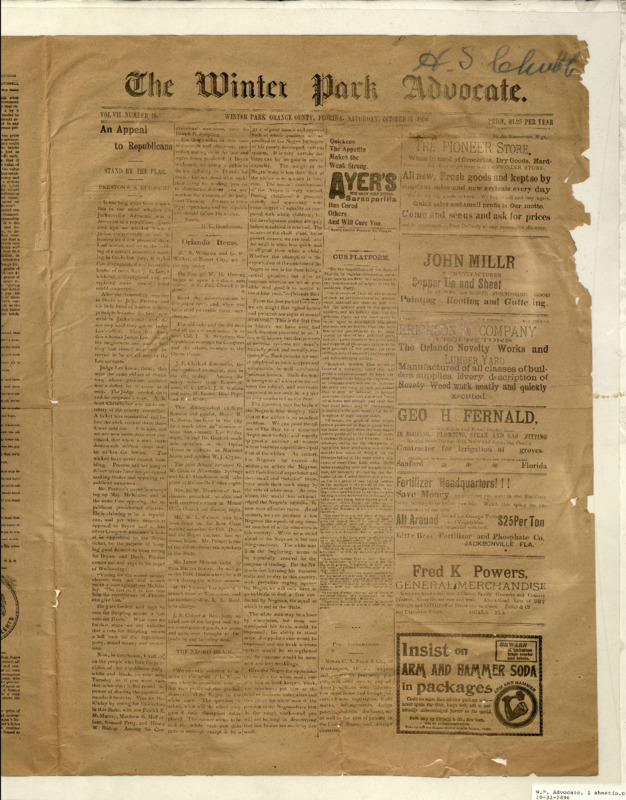
The front page of the Winter Park Advocate, October 31, 1896

The Winter Park Advocate was an African American newspaper in Winter Park, Florida. It was founded by Gus C. Henderson and published its first issue on May 31, 1889.

== History ==
The Advocate was first published on May 31, 1889. It was one of only two black-owned newspapers in the state of Florida. It was also the only newspaper in Winter Park, and thus served both African-American and Euro-American readers. Henderson was the publisher, reporter, editor, salesman, and typesetter for the paper. On the first day of the Advocate’s publication, there was a large Emancipation Day celebration. For the celebration, the Orlando and Winter Park Railroad ran special trains and almost 800 people were in attendance for the event. The paper's offices were located in Hannibal Square, the heart of Winter Park's segregated black community. The Advocate sold for $1.25 for a year's subscription, and published for two years until Henderson moved to Orlando.

== G.C. Henderson ==
Henderson was born on November 16, 1862, in Columbia County, near Lake City. Before moving to Winter Park, Henderson was Florida's first African-American traveling salesman. When that job did not work out, he moved to Winter Park. Shortly thereafter, Henderson started The Advocate. In his editorials, Henderson often focused on writing about education and voting rights for his fellow African Americans. He later started two other papers: the Christian Recorder and the Florida Record. Henderson died in 1915, at the age of 53.
