= Gus C. Henderson =

African-American community organizer

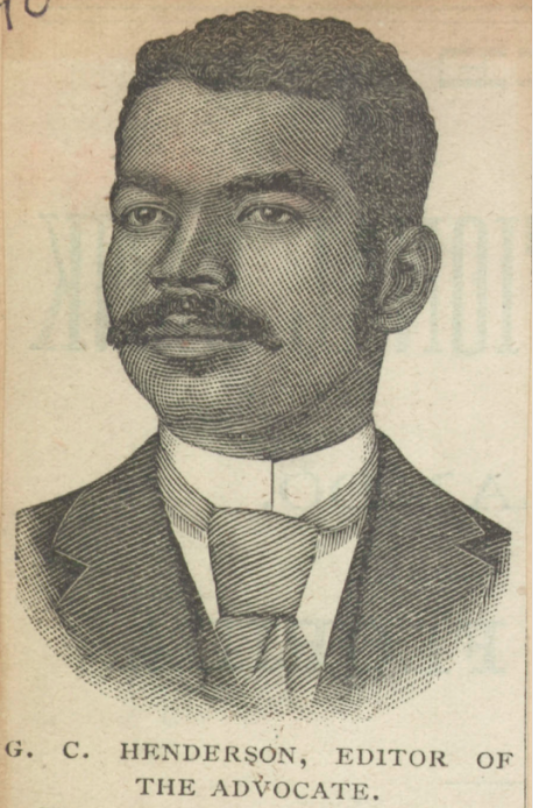
Gus C. Henderson

Gus C. Henderson (November 16, 1862–1915) was an African American community organizer from Central Florida in the United States. He is known for his role in the incorporation of Winter Park, Florida as a city, in support of Loring Chase's plans.

== Early life ==
Henderson was born near Lake City in Columbia County, Florida in 1862. His mother died when he was ten years old, leaving him to survive on whatever small wages he could earn himself. Despite this, Henderson read compulsively and taught himself. He remained in his home town for twenty years, before accepting a job working as a salesman for a company based in New York. Although initially successful in this job, designated the first "commercial tourist" in Florida and among the most effective salesmen in the company, he was asked to resign when it was realised that he was African-American, and left the company after just five months. The 24-year-old Henderson then made his way to Winter Park, Florida, where he would contribute significantly to the development of the young community.

== Contributions to Winter Park ==
Henderson was a staunch Republican, and in one speech he said that "all we ever received came from Republicans. Our citizenship, our Freedom, our free schools, and numerous good laws that have done great good for the Negro came from the Republican Party, and, gentleman, if that party never does any more special good for me, I shall die a Republican." As such, Henderson was a strong supporter of Chicago banker Loring Chase and his partner, Oliver Chapman, and their plan to incorporate the new city of Winter Park. Henderson was very active in encouraging black townspeople to vote in favour of the plan, which was instrumental as the 64 black residents registered to vote outnumbered the 47 registered white voters. Due to Henderson's encouragement, which included Henderson leading voters to the meeting from Hannibal Square, there were enough voters to pass the legislation, making Winter Park a city and Hannibal Square part of the district. In this respect Henderson is cited as having played an influential role in the incorporation of Winter Park as a city. Fairolyn H.Livingston, historian of the Hannibal Square Heritage Center, commented that "if it were not for Henderson's efforts, the incorporation of Winter Park would not have taken place on October 12, 1887, and Hannibal Square may not have originally been included within the city limits of Winter Park".

Henderson also founded a newspaper for the city, the Winter Park Advocate, whose first issue was published on May 31, 1889. The newspaper was one of two black newspapers published in Florida at the time. He began as manager but went on to assume the position of collector, reporter and editor. The newspaper focused on the interests of local people, social gatherings, community politics and so on, and found readership among both the white and black communities. Articles written by Henderson included "Christmas in Hannibal Square", "A Gala in Hannibal Square", "Colored Free Masons", and "High school for Colored Youth".

After two years, Henderson left the Winter Park Advocate and moved away from Winter Park to Orlando, where in 1906 he opened another newspaper, The Florida Recorder (Colored) Republican. Henderson died in 1915.
