= Central Avenue (Tampa) =

Road in Tampa, Florida, USA

Central Avenue in Tampa, Florida is a road in downtown that was the heart of its African American community before being seized by eminent domain and razed for interstate construction and a park.

== Location ==
Central Avenue runs north from downtown Tampa through the Heights district to the Hillsborough River. Originally, Central Avenue ran continuously to the river, only interrupted by Robles Park. Today, it is split by the interstate.

== History ==
In the late 1800s, Central Avenue was situated on the western edge of the neighborhood known as The Scrub, Tampa's first African-American neighborhood. Central Avenue was first listed as Center Avenue in the Tampa City directory in 1886. At that time, the directory did not list any African-American-owned businesses on Central Ave. As Tampa began to grow, so did Central Avenue. By 1899, records show 19 black-owned businesses on the avenue, eventually also becoming home to Tampa's first African-American newspaper, The Florida Reporter.

The area grew into a thriving black business district and entertainment hot spot. One of the cornerstones of the black business district was the Cotton Club on Central Avenue, which hosted some all-time greats, including Ella_Fitzgerald and Duke Ellington. Central Avenue was one of the major stops on what was known as the Chitlin Circuit.

The area also inspired artist Ray Charles, who wrote the "St. Pete Florida Blues" and Hank Ballard. Ballard, upon seeing young people on Central Avenue doing a new dance move, wrote "The Twist", which was later recorded by Chubby Checker and became a number one hit .

The Cotton Club was the last business standing in the historically black section of Central Avenue. It closed in 1974 due to civil unrest and interstate expansion.

A historical marker commemorating its history can be found at the intersection of North Orange Avenue and East Harrison Street on the grounds of Perry Harvey, Sr. Park

WEDU produced a documentary on Central Avenue and its history.
