= Rollins College =

Private college in Winter Park, Florida, US

Coordinates: 28.59146°N 81.34835°W

- Motto: Fiat Lux (Latin)
- Motto in English: "Let there be light"
- Type: Private liberal arts college
- Established: November 4, 1885; 141 years ago
- Accreditation: SACS
- Academic affiliations: Annapolis Group; CLAC; ICUF; Oberlin Group; NAICU; SAISA
- Endowment: $509.2 million (2025)
- President: Brooke Barnett
- Provost: Donald Davison
- Students: 3,029 (2024)
- Undergraduates: 2,567 (2024)
- Postgraduates: 556 (2018)
- Other students: 537 (2018)
- Location: Winter Park, Florida, United States
- Campus: 80 acres (32 ha); Large suburb
- Radio station: WPRK
- Newspaper: The Sandspur
- Colors: Blue and gold
- Nickname: Tars
- Sporting affiliations: NCAA Division II – Sunshine State
- Mascot: Tommy Tar
- Website: rollins.edu

Rollins College is a private liberal arts college in Winter Park, Florida, United States. It was founded in 1885. Florida's fourth oldest post-secondary institution and oldest private university, it has an approximate enrollment of 3,000 students, composed of roughly 2,500 undergraduates and 500 postgraduates.

== History ==
Rollins College is Florida's fourth oldest post-secondary institution, and has been independent, nonsectarian, and coeducational from conception. Lucy Cross, founder of the Daytona Institute for Young Women in 1880, first placed the matter of establishing a college in Florida before the Congregational Churches in 1884. In 1885, the church put her on the committee in charge of determining the location of their first college in Florida. Cross is known as the "Mother of Rollins College." Rollins was incorporated, organized, and named in the Lyman Park building in nearby Sanford, Florida, on April 28, 1885, opening for classes in Winter Park on November 4 of that year. It was established by New England Congregationalists who sought to bring their style of liberal arts education to the frontier St. John's basin. A commemorative plaque listing the names of the founders was dedicated 1 March 1954 and is displayed in historic Downtown Sanford.

Early benefactors of Rollins College included Chicago businessman Alonzo Rollins (1832–1887), for whom the college is named. Rollins made substantial donations to enable the founding of the college, and was a trustee and its first treasurer.

Another early benefactor was Franklin Fairbanks of St. Johnsbury, Vermont. Fairbanks was president of Fairbanks Scales, a founder of Winter Park, a donor to Rollins College, and a trustee.

In March of 1936 during a visit to Central Florida, U.S. president Franklin D. Roosevelt was conferred an honorary degree in literature at the Knowles Chapel on campus. Other U.S. presidents who have visited the campus include Calvin Coolidge (1930), Harry Truman (1949), Ronald Reagan (1976; prior to his 1980 election), and Barack Obama (2012).

=== Firing of John Andrew Rice and required loyalty pledge ===
President Hamilton Holt decided to require all professors to make a "loyalty pledge" to keep their jobs. In March 1933, Holt fired John Andrew Rice, an atheist scholar and unorthodox teacher, whom Holt had hired, along with three other "golden personalities" (as Holt called them), in his push to put Rollins on the cutting edge of innovative education, for refusing to sign the loyalty pledge. The widely publicized case was investigated by the American Association of University Professors, which censured Rollins. It is known as the "Rollins College Case" among historians of tenure. The four fired faculty quickly founded experimental Black Mountain College, with a gift from a former Rollins College faculty member.

=== Okinawa statue ===
In October 1994, the school made international headlines when the government of Japan, per the request of its Okinawa Prefecture, asked for the return of a statue that was taken as war loot after the Battle of Okinawa in 1945 by Clinton C. Nichols, at that time, a lieutenant commander in the United States Navy and a Rollins alumnus. Nichols had presented the statue of Ninomiya Sontoku, a prominent 19th-century Japanese agricultural leader, philosopher, moralist, and economist, to then-President Hamilton Holt, who promised to display the statue permanently in the main lobby of the Warren Administration Building. The statue was returned to Okinawa in 1995 in commemoration of the 50th anniversary of the end of World War II. In addition to providing the school with a replica of the original statue, the government of Okinawa and Rollins pledged to develop additional cooperative projects between the college and Shogaku Junior and Senior High School, the Okinawan school where the original statue has been placed.

=== Kairis case ===
On March 31, 1998, the body of Jennifer Leah Kairis, a sophomore student, was found in her Ward Hall dormitory room by a residential assistant. Kairis, who had attended a fraternity party by a chapter on campus hours before she had died, was both legally intoxicated and had a large amount of prescription drugs in her system. At first, the assistant medical examiner at the Orange County coroner's office ruled Kairis' death as a homicide. However, that conclusion was quickly changed after Shashi Gore, the county's chief medical examiner ruled that she had died as a result of an accidental prescription drug overdose. Kairis' parents, who always believed their daughter was raped and murdered by her college boyfriend, requested a lengthy state investigation into their daughter's death due to their belief that the Winter Park Police Department botched the case. On March 4, 2004, Bruce Hyma, the Miami-Dade County chief medical examiner and expert toxicologist hired by State Attorney Lawson Lamar ruled that Kairis had committed suicide via a prescription drug overdose. The seven-year investigation was officially closed on April 13, 2005.

== Campus ==
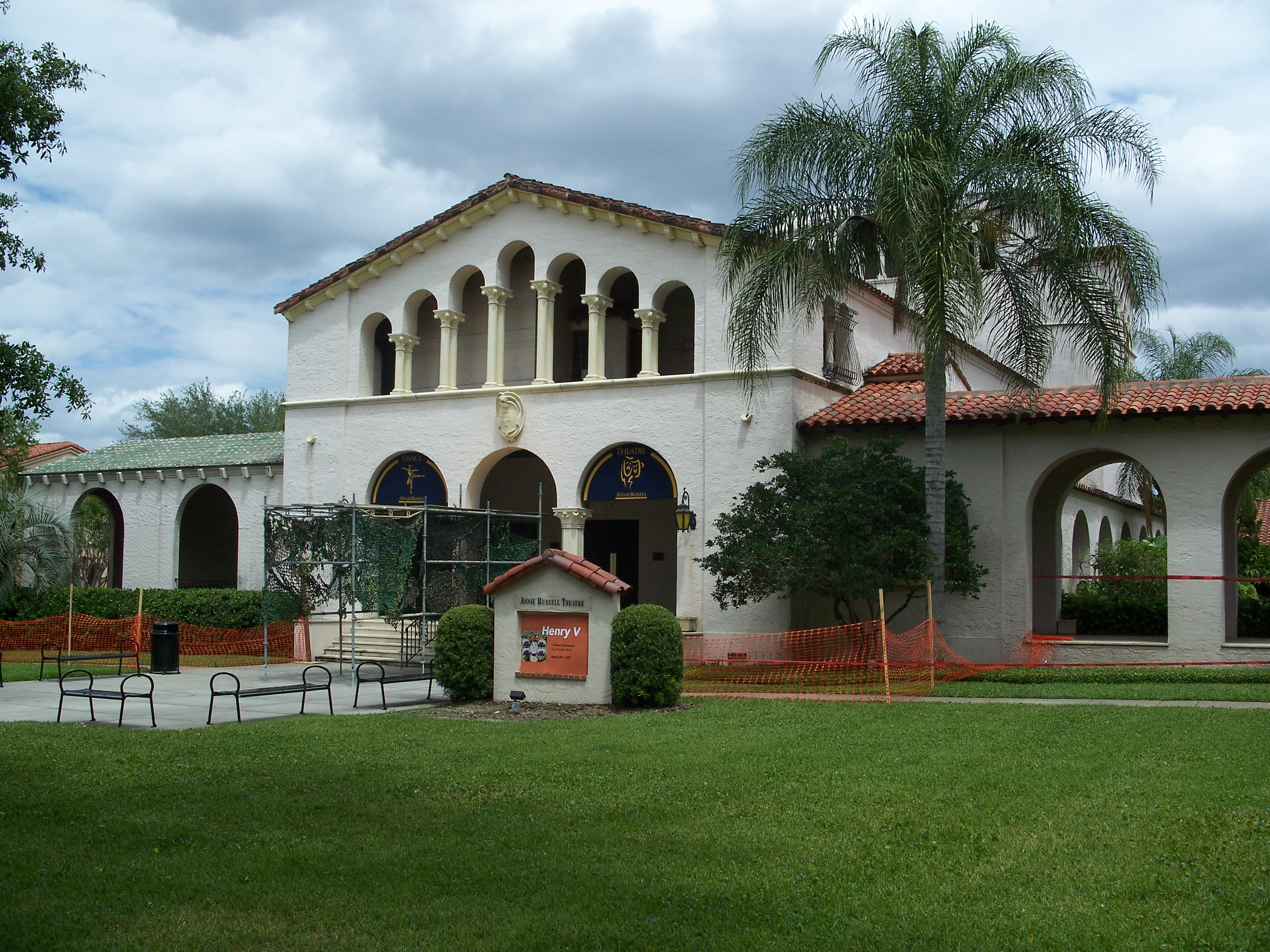
Rollins College theatre

The 70-acre (28 ha) campus contains a range of amenities, including a theater for performing arts; the Cornell Campus Center; and the Alfond Sports Center. The college is in Winter Park, Florida, across from Park Avenue.

=== Architecture ===
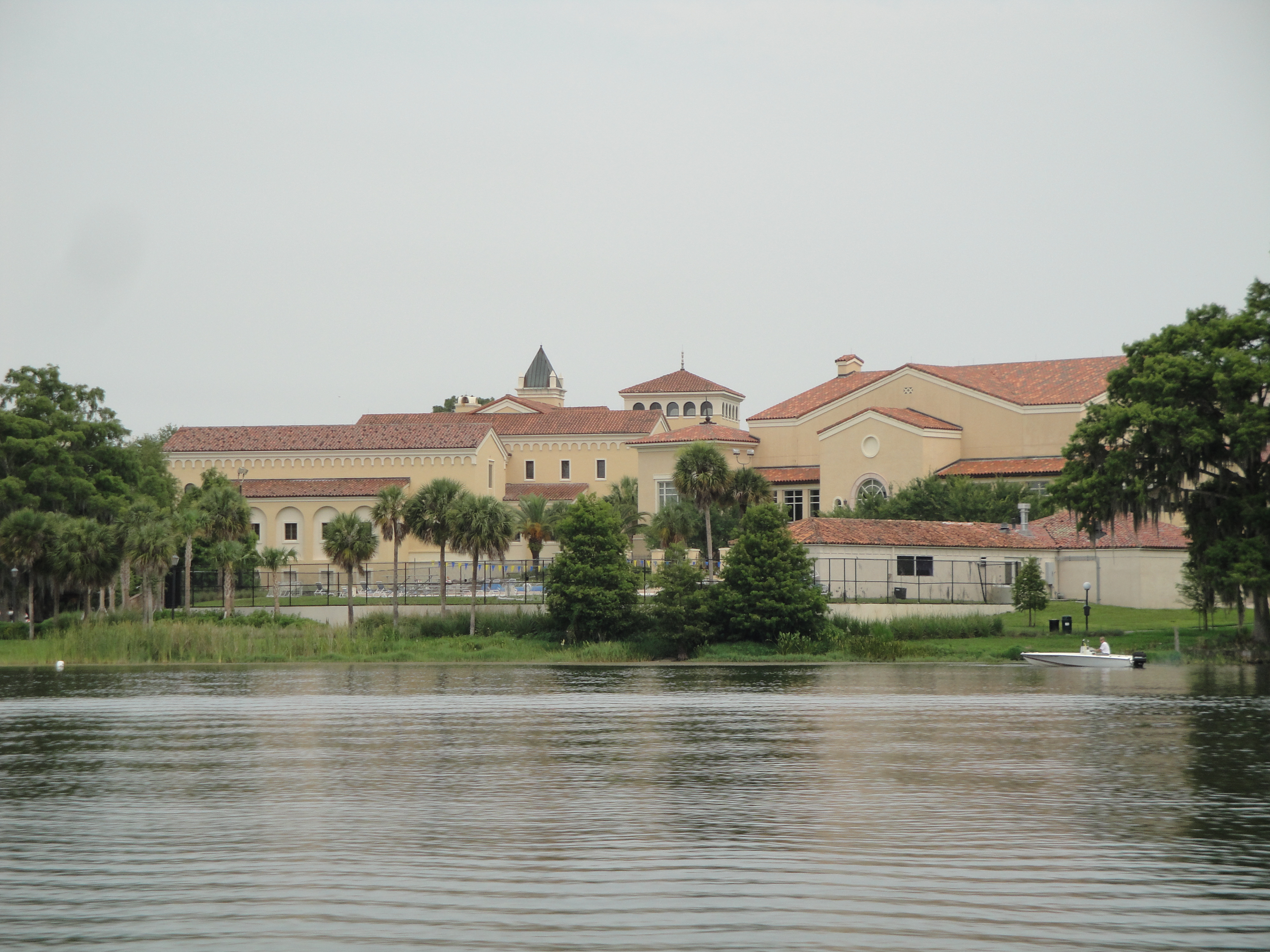
View of buildings from Lake Virginia

The Rollins campus features Spanish and Mediterranean Revival style architecture. According to College Historian Jack C. Lane, the Spanish-Mediterranean style blended best with the natural environment of Florida, and that Rollins 8th president Hamilton Holt felt "the college's unified curriculum should be reflected in the architectural style." Rollins' campus architecture has stayed consistent since its opening.

=== Pugsley Hall and Mayflower Hall ===
In 1930, President Holt announced the gifts of Cornelius Pugsley and an anonymous donor for the construction of two women's dormitories, with their interiors designed by Virginia Huntington Robie. Pugsley and Mayflower Halls were dedicated in 1931. Mayflower Hall received its name from the Pilgrim ship. The Society of Friends at Chalfont St. Giles, Buckinghamshire, gave Rollins a 16-inch section of beam from the ship, which, it had been discovered, had been salvaged to build a haybarn in England. The block of wood was placed above the fireplace in Mayflower Hall. Tau Kappa Epsilon fraternity moved into Pugsley Hall in 1997.

=== Chase Hall ===
Chase Hall was built in 1908 and named for Loring Augustus Chase. It was built using white sand-lime brick with stone trim and a Ludowici tile roof. At its construction it contained eight double and six single rooms, along with a large common room.

The hall was used as a men's dormitory through 1966. Until 1999 it was used by the Sigma Phi Epsilon fraternity, followed by the Phi Delta Theta fraternity. The Lucy Cross Center for Women and Their Allies was established in 2010 at Rollins College in Chase Hall, Room 205. The center is named after Lucy Cross, the "Mother of Rollins College."

=== Hooker Hall ===
Hooker Hall was named after, the first president of Rollins College, Edward Payson Hooker (1838-1904). The building was originally used as housing for the Theta Kappa Nu fraternity then, in 1939, the Lambda Chi Alpha fraternity moved in. Hooker was a Chi Psi at Middlebury College (Mu '54) and played an integral part in bringing the Chi Psi chapter, Alpha Mu Delta, to Rollins in 1977. Today, Hooker Hall is home to the Chi Psi fraternity, and is known to many faculty and students as The Chi Psi Lodge.

=== Pinehurst Cottage ===
The Rollins College website states that Pinehurst Cottage and Knowles I, the two structures established when the college founded, suffered a fire in 1909 which destroyed Knowles Hall and scorched Pinehurst's exterior. Pinehurst, originally a women's residence hall, over the years transformed into a men's dormitory, co-ed dormitory, the home of President Ward, a Library, chemistry lab, infirmary and then classroom. In November 1985, Pinehurst received Winter Park's Historic Preservation Commission's Historic Landmark award. The college renovated to maintain the building's original appearance. Today, Pinehurst is a co-ed residence hall that houses a special interest group which promotes academic fulfillment outside the classroom.

=== Alfond Boathouse ===
Built in 1988 to fulfill the Rollins College waterski and sailing teams' needs. The Alfond Boathouse sits on lake Virginia and has a total of 3 offices used by the waterski and sailing coaches, as well as a classroom, boat bay and observation deck. The exterior was renovated in 2016.

=== Peace Monument ===
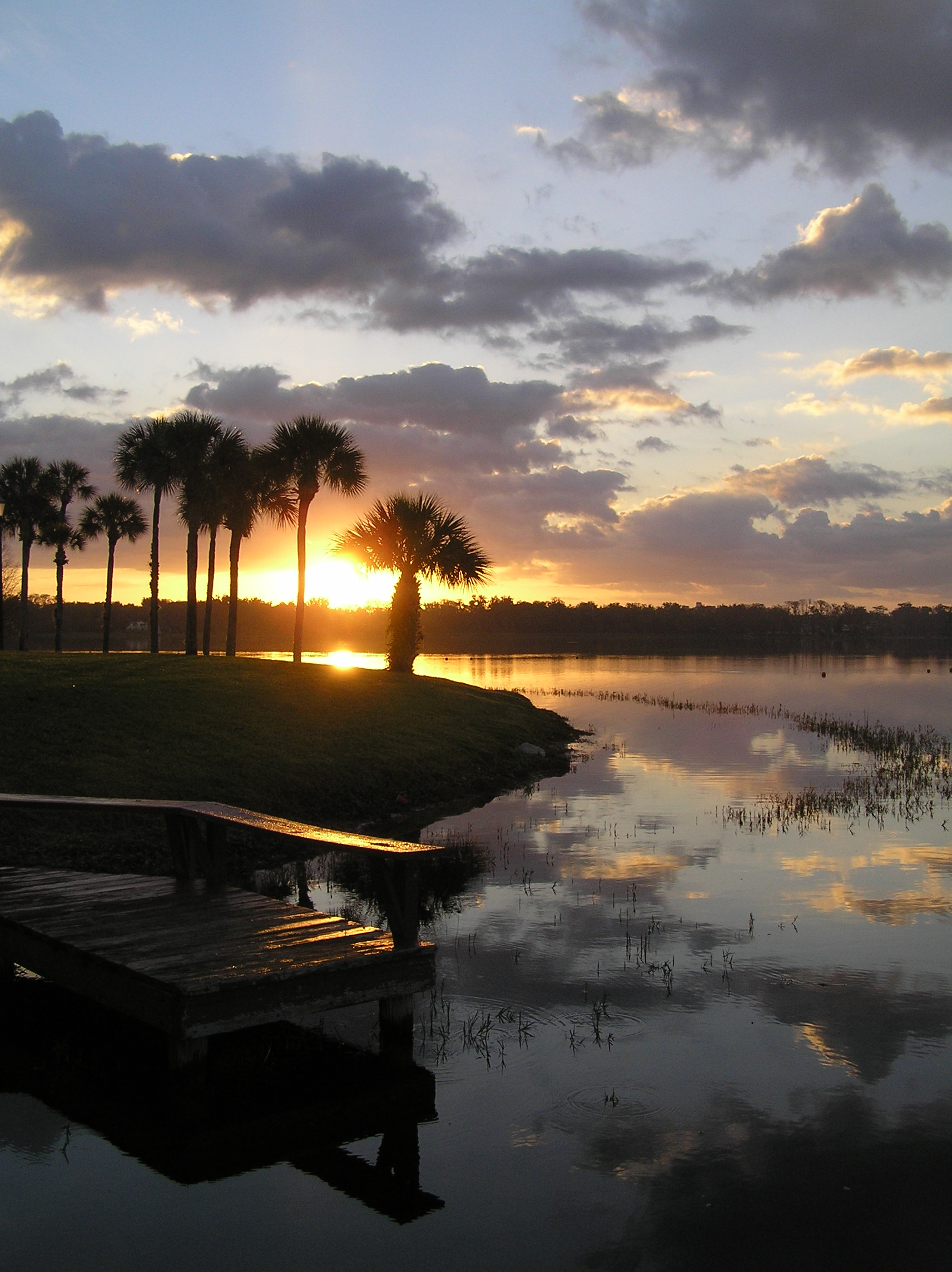
Sunrise over Lake Virginia from Rollins College campus

Erected in 1938 and dedicated on Armistice Day by college president Hamilton Holt, it consists of a German artillery shell, surrendered by Germany at the end of the First World War, mounted on a pedestal, bearing an inscribed poem by Hamilton Holt titled "Pause, passerby and hang your head in shame."

=== Winter Park Institute ===
The Winter Park Institute, located in the Osceola Lodge on Interlachen Avenue, brings scholars, leaders, and artists from diverse fields of disciplines and expertise to the Rollins campus for symposiums, seminars, lectures, interviews, exhibits, readings, and master classes that are always free and open to the public. Following the legacy began by President Hamilton Holt and continued by President Hugh McKean, the Institute launched in the fall of 2008, the first guest being U.S. poet laureate Billy Collins, who has returned every year since. Many prominent singers and speakers have appeared there.

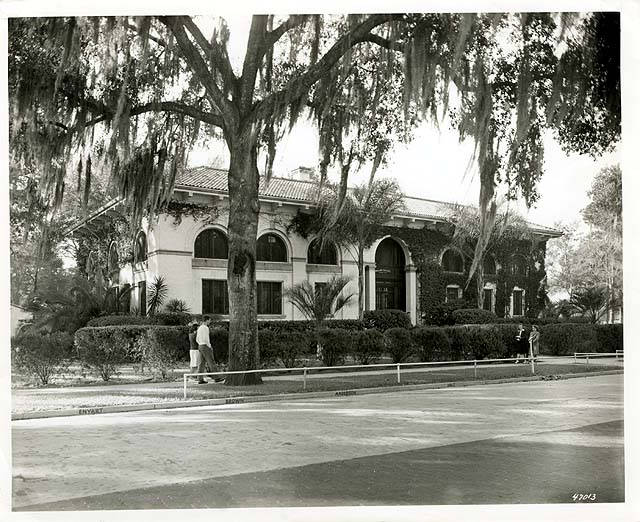
Rollins College Carnegie Library (Now Olin Library)

=== Olin Library ===
Rollins' Olin Library was dedicated in 1985, with a US$4.7 million grant from the F.W. Olin Foundation ($14.6 million today). It is four stories high, with 54,000 square feet (5,000 m^{2}) containing thousands of volumes, periodicals, serials, electronic resources, a number of special collections, and hundreds of compact discs, DVDs, and videotapes. From 1909 until 2011, the library was a federal government documents repository. Olin still provides access to hundreds of online government resources. Olin Library was one of three recipients of the 2013 ACRL Excellence in Academic Libraries Award.

==== Olin Electronic Research and Information Center ====
The Olin Electronic Research and Information Center was also established in 1998 with a second gift of US$2.7 million from the F.W. Olin Foundation ($5.42 million today). The center features the latest technology, including computer stations, color printers, scanners, audio and video digitizers, compact discs, videodiscs, and videotapes. These tools facilitate creativity as students pursue research questions, prepare multimedia presentations, and create Web pages.

==== Origins as a "Carnegie Library" ====
Olin Libraries' collection is one of the oldest and most extensive in Central Florida, dating back (1909-1951) to its Carnegie Library founding as one of the original 14 Florida libraries funded by Andrew Carnegie. The original collection, at the founding of Rollins College in 1885, consisted of one Christian Bible and one dictionary. According to Cohen (2006), Carnegie's "donation of 108 libraries to colleges in the first two decades of the twentieth century assisted 10% of the institutions of higher learning in the United States. Carnegie had a preference for colleges and universities that served African-American students, which Rollins College president William Fremont Blackman noted the school did in a letter to Carnegie appealing for a library in 1904:

The fact that it is the only college in the country, North or South, in which the grandchildren of abolitionists and confederate soldiers, in about equal numbers, sit together in the same class-room and play together on the same athletic field, and learn thus to understand, respect and love one another;

Blackman's request consisted of $35,000 in total ($1,254,167 today): "$20,000 for a fireproof building, $3,000 for books, and $12,000 as an endowment for the continued purchase of books" ($716,667, $107,500 and $430,000 today respectively). Blackman received a response from Carnegie's secretary James Bertram that noted the request was too general for consideration, and that Carnegie would need a profile of the university before consideration. Little progress was made for over a year, when Blackman again wrote to Carnegie, noting the university's need for a library. Trustees and friends of the university wrote to Carnegie on Blackman's behalf, including W.W. Cummer, a trustee from Jacksonville who served on the board of the city's new Carnegie Library. A letter dated 22 June 1905 and written from Carnegie's home in Scotland brought the welcome news of the offer of a library. Carnegie offered $20,000 ($716,667 today) for the construction of a library provided that the same amount would be raised for the library's upkeep. While grateful for Carnegie's proposal, Blackman was uneasy with its terms because the amount of funding required to match Carnegie's offer would put a strain on those who had donated to start the college's endowment fund of $200,000 as well as paid a debt of $30,000 ($8.24 million combined today).

In a January 1906 letter Blackman wrote to Carnegie expressing concern about meeting the conditions for the gift, noting that the college had a large debt that took "considerable self-sacrifice on the part of our friends". That summer, another Florida college, Stetson University, was awarded $40,000 ($1,433,333 today) for a library from Carnegie. Upon learning this Blackman again wrote to Carnegie, seeking to amend the original terms of the agreement to match the amount that Stetson was awarded. He was turned down, but a year later was able to notify Carnegie that the school's trustees had been able to match the $20,000 necessary for the gift to be awarded. Bertram wrote to Blackman to inform him that Carnegie had "authorized his Cashier...to arrange payments on Library Building, as work progresses, to the extent of Twenty Thousand Dollars." ($794,732 today) The library, to be named Carnegie Hall, was dedicated on February 18, 1909.

The building had over 8,000 square feet of space, and was the school's first dedicated library building. It served as a library from 1909 until 1951. In addition to its function as a library, Carnegie Hall also served as the school's post office. Since the library was moved from Carnegie to the newly built Mills Memorial Library, it has also housed a bookstore, admissions office, faculty offices, and human resources office.

=== Archibald Granville Bush Science Center ===
The Bush Science Center at Rollins has state of the art SMART classrooms, faculty offices, and 38 teaching and research laboratories for the physical and behavioral sciences, mathematics, and computer science. The science center is where Donald J. Cram launched his chemical studies, becoming the 1987 Nobel Prize winner in Chemistry. Construction of the redesign of the Archibald Granville Bush Science Center began in the spring of 2012 and was completed prior to the beginning of the fall 2013 semester. The science center, which has 103,580 square feet and cost $30 million to upgrade ($42.9 million today), is now the largest building at Rollins. It has three floors and includes 51 offices, 15 classrooms, 15 teaching labs, 19 research labs and 18 student/faculty lounges.

=== Rollins Museum of Art ===
The Cornell Fine Arts Museum is located on school grounds and contains works of art and objects from antiquity to the 21st century. The museum was built instead of what would have been the Ackland Art Museum at Rollins; millionaire and amateur art collector William Hayes Ackland (1855-1940). After Ackland's death, Duke refused the request, and UNC and Rollins, excised from Ackland's final will, both brought suit to locate Ackland's museum on their campuses. The case went to the United States Supreme Court, with Rollins being represented by former U.S. attorney general Homer Cummings.

=== Annie Russell Theatre ===
The Annie Russell Theatre is a historic theater in Winter Park, Florida, located on the premises of Rollins College. The theatre was named in 1931 after actress Annie Russell, who taught at Rollins. It was designed by the architect Richard Kiehnel of Kiehnel and Elliott. In 1998, it was added to the National Register of Historic Places.

=== Knowles Memorial Chapel ===
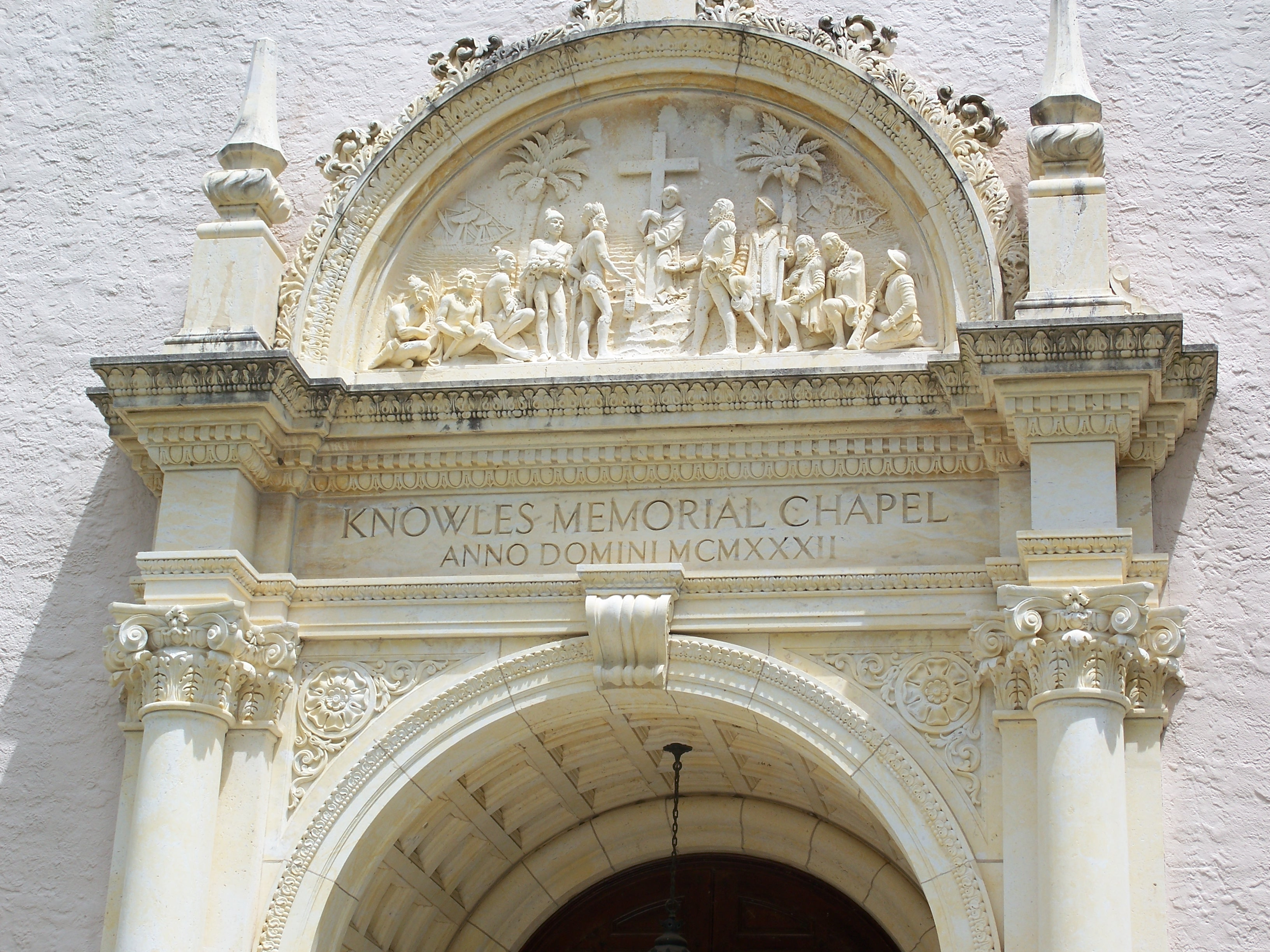
Knowles Memorial Chapel

The Knowles Memorial Chapel is a historic chapel on the Rollins campus. In 1998, it was added to the National Register of Historic Places.

Ground was broken for the chapel on March 9, 1931, and the cornerstone was laid on May 12 of the same year. The dedication service for the chapel took place just a year later on March 29, 1932. Though founded by a Congregational Church educational committee, Rollins has no religious affiliation, so the chapel is interdenominational. A Protestant service is held on Sunday mornings, and Catholic Mass is held on Sunday evenings.

A highlight of the chapel is a circular window of the seven liberal arts designed by Ralph Adams Cram and William Herbert Burnham.

=== Walk of Fame ===
The Rollins Walk of Fame, which circles Mills lawn, consists of stones taken from places connected to historic people. Past college president Hamilton Holt came up with the idea in the 1920s, and based the Walk of Fame on the "ancestral walk" at his home in Connecticut. The idea, Holt wrote, was "unique in conception and execution".

Holt officially dedicated the Walk of Fame in October 1929, originally calling it the Memorial Path of Fame. Holt presented 22 stones, including stones from the homes of American luminaries George Washington, Henry Wadsworth Longfellow, Daniel Webster, Calvin Coolidge, and Ralph Waldo Emerson. Later additions would include stones from places associated with famous figures as diverse as St. Augustine, Emperor Humayun, and William Wordsworth. By 1932 the Walk of Fame had over 200 stones, many of which Holt himself had brought back to campus: the Charles Dickens stone he had picked up while visiting Gad's Hill. He claimed that the Mohammed stone was brought back from Mecca by a student's sister.

After Holt retired as president of the college in 1949, stones began to disappear often around graduation time; many were thrown into Lake Virginia. Only in the 1980s, under the presidency of Thaddeus Seymour (president from 1978 to 1990), was there an Official Lapidarian responsible for taking care of the stones. As of 2003, the Walk of Fame had about 530 stones, the vast majority (455) honoring men. Most stones are associated with specific people, but a few—like the stones from Australia and the Berlin Wall—honor places or events.

== Academics ==
Rollins has three divisions that offer a variety of programs: College of Arts and Sciences; Crummer Graduate School of Business; and Hamilton Holt School.

US News states that undergraduates at Rollins can choose from about 30 majors, ranging from Latin American and Caribbean studies to computer science and biochemistry to theatre arts and dance. In addition to its undergraduate programs, Rollins offers an M.B.A. program through the Crummer Graduate School of Business. Other graduate degrees granted include Master of Public Health (MPH), Master of Arts in teaching, Master of Education in elementary education, Master of Human Resources, and Master of Liberal Studies. Its most popular undergraduate majors, by number out of 593 graduates in 2022, were Business Administration and Management (120), Communication (63), and International Business/Trade/Commerce (56).

=== Admissions ===
Rollins' admissions process is "more selective" according to U.S. News & World Report.

For the class entering Fall 2018, 3,635 freshmen were accepted out of 5,455 applicants, a 66.6% acceptance rate, and 549 enrolled. Fall 2018 enrolling students had an average GPA of 3.31; the middle 50% range of SAT scores was 590–680 for reading and writing, and 560–680 for math, while the ACT Composite range was 24–30. Women constituted 58.3% of the incoming freshmen class, men 41.7%.

=== Rankings ===
Academic rankings

Master's
- Washington Monthly: 227

Regional
- U.S. News & World Report: 1

National
- Forbes: 241
- WSJ/College Pulse: 264

Rollins College was again named No. 1 in the U.S. News & World Report's 2021 "Best Regional Universities South Rankings". The institution was also named "No. 13 overall for Best Value Universities in the South".

Rollins earned the first overall spot on U.S. News & World Report's 2021 "Best Regional Universities South Rankings". The college was also named No. 1 for "Best Undergraduate Teaching" and 14th for "Best Value Schools" in the Regional Universities South category.

According to U.S. News & World Report's 2020 "Best Regional Universities South Rankings", Rollins was ranked first overall in the southern United States out of 136 regional universities whose highest degree is a Master's, first for "Best Undergraduate Teaching", tied for fourth for "Most Innovative Schools", seventh for "Best Value", and tied for 87th in "Top Performers on Social Mobility".

The college has also been named one of the top national producers of Fulbright Scholars among Masters granting institutions throughout the U.S. Since inception of the scholarship in 1951, 48 Rollins students have been awarded the honor, as of 2019.

=== College of Arts and Sciences ===
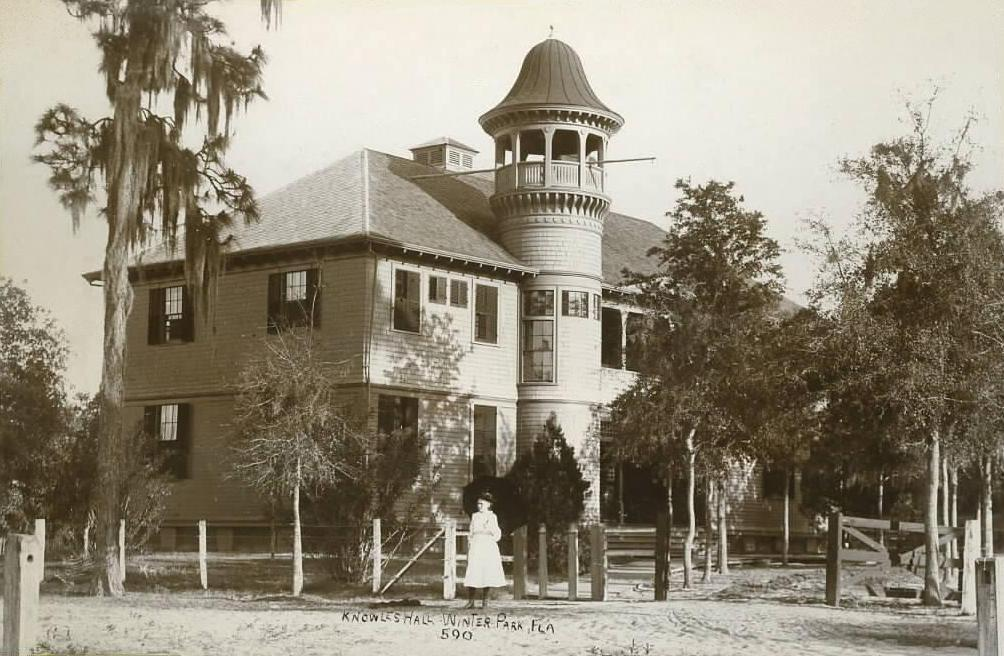
Old Knowles Hall, 1886–1909, the college's first classroom building.

In 2010, the College of Arts and Sciences and the College of Professional Studies have a total of 1,884 students and a student to faculty ratio of 10 to 1.

=== Crummer Graduate School of Business ===
The Rollins College Crummer Graduate School of Business offers a Masters in Business Administration (MBA) through three different programs:

The Rollins MBA programs are listed in several national rankings of business schools, including:

- Forbes: 44th in the Nation (2017)
- Leadership Excellence: #1 in Florida (2018)

As of 2018, the Rollins Full-Time and Part-Time MBA programs are listed as Rank Not Published, or "RNP". The bottom quarter of rank-eligible full-time MBA programs are listed as Rank Not Published. Rank Not Published means that U.S. News calculated a numerical rank for that program but decided for editorial reasons not to publish it.

The Rollins MBA is accredited by the Association to Advance Collegiate Schools of Business.

=== Hamilton Holt School ===
Adult education courses at Rollins were initially only offered to returning World War II veterans. On September 7, 1960, the executive committee of the Board of Trustees of Rollins College gave formal authorization for the Institute for General Studies to award degrees upon completion of program requirements. On November 6, 1987, the school's name was changed to The Hamilton Holt School, in honor of Rollins' eighth president.

=== Special programs ===
==== Rollins College Conference (RCC) ====
The Rollins College Conference, taken in the first semester of a student's freshman year, is required of all non-transfer students in the College of Arts and Sciences. The course serves as both an orientation course and a topic course in a student's area of interest. The professor for this course will serve as the enrolled students' academic advisor until they select a major and choose a new advisor from the corresponding department. One or two peer mentors (upperclassmen with special training) join the course and offer counseling and support to the new students.

==== Honors Degree Program ====
The Honors Degree Program allows the top students in each entering class of the College of Arts and Sciences to complete a series of special interdisciplinary seminars, which replace approximately two-thirds of the school's general education requirements. To earn an honors degree, students must also complete a thesis in their major field during their junior and senior years.

== Athletics ==
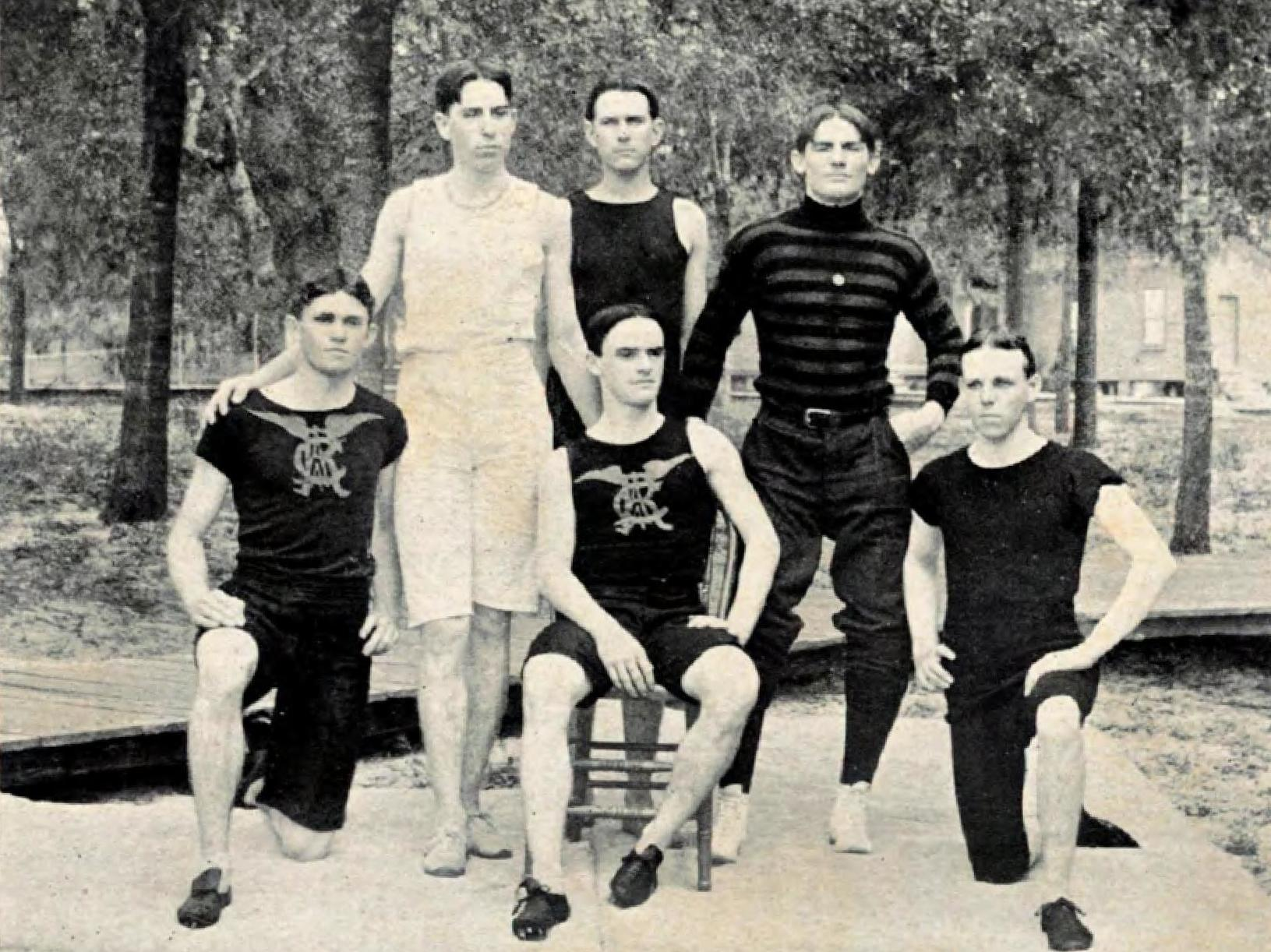
1898 track team

Rollins participates in NCAA Division II's Sunshine State Conference for the majority of its sports; the college's women's lacrosse program competes as a DII independent program.

The rowing teams compete in the Southern Intercollegiate Rowing Association and Florida Intercollegiate Rowing Association while the sailing squad competes in the South Atlantic Intercollegiate Sailing Association. The Rollins water skiing teams compete in NCAA Division I, the only school program to do so. Rollins' athletic teams are called the Tars (an archaic name for a sailor).

Rollins' Athletic Tradition includes 23 National Championships and 67 Sunshine State Conference titles. The school sponsors twenty-three varsity teams: The most successful sport in the history of Rollins is Women's Golf. They have 13 national championship titles. In 1950 and 1956, Betty Rowland and Marlene Stewart Streit, respectively, won the women's individual intercollegiate golf championship (an event conducted by the Division of Girls' and Women's Sports (DGWS) — which later evolved into the current NCAA women's golf championship). In later years, Bettina Walker (1988, 1989), Debbie Pappas (1990, 1991, 1992), Mariana De Biase (2006) and Joanna Coe (2008) also became individual national champions at the Small College and NCAA Division II levels.

== Campus life ==
Rollins College is located in Winter Park, a few minutes from downtown Orlando. There are more than 150 student clubs and organizations on campus. The Tars, Rollins's athletic teams, compete in the NCAA Division II Sunshine State Conference and field a varsity waterskiing team among others. A sizeable Greek life on campus comprises more than 10 fraternities and sororities. About 75 percent of students live on campus in one of the residence halls or apartment complexes. In addition, there are weekly shuttles, "Rolly Trolly", to provide transport to a shopping area for the students.

=== Fox Day ===
Fox Day is an annual tradition at Rollins. Since 1956 (except during the tenure of President Jack Critchfield, 1969–1978), each spring, the president cancels all classes, providing undergraduate students with a surprise day off to explore local beaches and amusement parks, together as a college, returning in the late afternoon for a barbecue. It is known as Fox Day, because a statue of a fox is placed on Mills Lawn (the school's main lawn), signifying the day off.

=== Winter Park Bach Festival ===
Since 1935, the Winter Park Bach Festival, the third-oldest continuously operating Bach festival in the United States, has brought some of the highest caliber of classical performers from around the world to campus, for a two-week event. The 150-voice Bach Festival Society is regarded as one of the finest oratorio societies in America.

=== WPRK 91.5 The Best in Basement Radio ===
WPRK 91.5 FM the Best in Basement Radio is a non-commercial college radio station located in Winter Park, Florida, owned and operated by Rollins College. Its signal is audible in most of the Orlando metropolitan area, or from Seaworld to Sanford as said by DJs on-air.

== In popular culture ==
After a speaking appearance at Rollins in 1988, Kurt Vonnegut used it as one of the models for the school in Hocus Pocus.
