= Disney's Blizzard Beach =

Water park in Walt Disney World

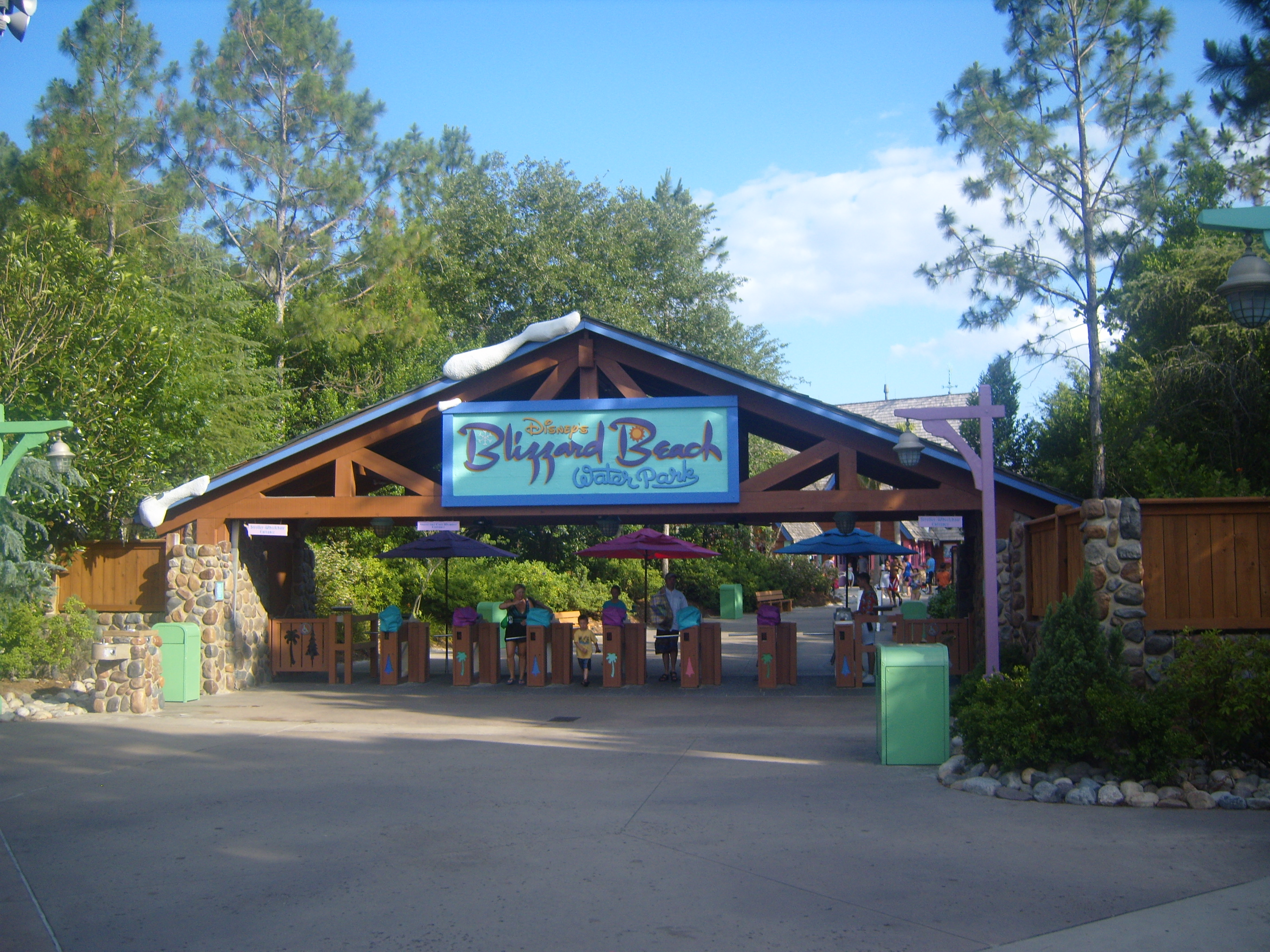
- Interactive map of Disney's Blizzard Beach
- Location: Walt Disney World Resort, Bay Lake, Florida, U.S.
- Coordinates: 28.351804°N 81.575415°W
- Status: Operating
- Opened: April 1, 1995; 31 years ago
- Owner: Disney Experiences (The Walt Disney Company)
- Operated by: Walt Disney World
- Theme: "Melting" ski resort
- Operating season: Year-round with annual maintenance closure
- Website: Official website

Disney's Blizzard Beach is a water theme park located at the Walt Disney World Resort in Bay Lake, Florida, near Orlando. All water areas are heated to approximately 80 °F (27 °C), with the exception of the melting snow in the ice cave of Cross Country Creek.

The park opened on April 1, 1995, as the third Walt Disney World water park after River Country and Typhoon Lagoon. In 2016, the park hosted approximately 2,091,000 guests, ranking it the third-most visited water park in the world behind its sister park Typhoon Lagoon.

Blizzard Beach is open year-round with an annual maintenance closure in the winter. When Blizzard Beach is closed, Typhoon Lagoon remains open.

The park's winter theming was conceived by designer-Imagineer Marshall Monroe, a Creative Executive and Principal Technical Staff at the Walt Disney Company. Innovative elements of the park include a beach chair-themed chair lift, complete with beach umbrellas, and pretend snow skis. The setting and atmosphere of the park blend together tropical landscaping with simulated melting snow. The central mountain is unique as a large structure in the high water table Floridian woodland. The architecture brings together an aesthetic of alpine lodges with Caribbean colors and accents.

The water park, along with all the other Walt Disney World parks, closed in March 2020 due to the ongoing COVID-19 pandemic. Blizzard Beach and Typhoon Lagoon remained closed while the four other Walt Disney World theme parks reopened from July 11–15, 2020. Disney's Blizzard Beach reopened at Walt Disney World Resort on March 7, 2021, after being closed for nearly a year.

On April 1, 2025, it was announced that both water parks would be open together for the summer season for the first time since 2019. Blizzard Beach closed for brief refurbishment on May 1, before reopening on May 21 to join Typhoon Lagoon for the summer season.

== Park story ==
According to Disney "legend," a freak snowstorm on January 11, 1977, in the area led to the development of Florida's first ski resort. Ski lifts were put up, toboggan runs were laid down, and an entire resort area blossomed around the mountain of snow. Naturally, because of the normal temperatures in Florida, the snow dissipated very quickly, and the snow rapidly turned into slush. This left behind a collection of waterlogged yet snowless ski jumps and chair lifts. The operators were preparing to cut their losses and walk away. However, they were interrupted by a loud yell coming from the summit of the mountain of melting snow, and looked up to see a blue alligator sliding down the mountain at top speed. Ice Gator, the blue cartoon mascot of the park, then landed in a pool of melted snow at the base of the mountain with a thunderous splash. The ski resort operators suddenly saw the park's potential, and the mountain of snow became Disney's Blizzard Beach, "the most slushy, slippery, exhilarating water park anywhere!"

As the story goes in Disney's promotional materials, slalom courses, bobsled, and toboggan runs became downhill water slides. The creek of melted snow that formed at the base of the mountain became a relaxing tube ride. The chairlift carried swimmers instead of skiers. The ski jump became the "tallest and fastest water slide in the world."

== Park layout ==
=== Green Slope ===
The Green Slope attractions (all single-track water slides, not meant for racing), are found at the uppermost point of Mount Gushmore. They can be accessed by foot, or by chairlift. The chairlift is a one-way ride except for guests with disabilities.

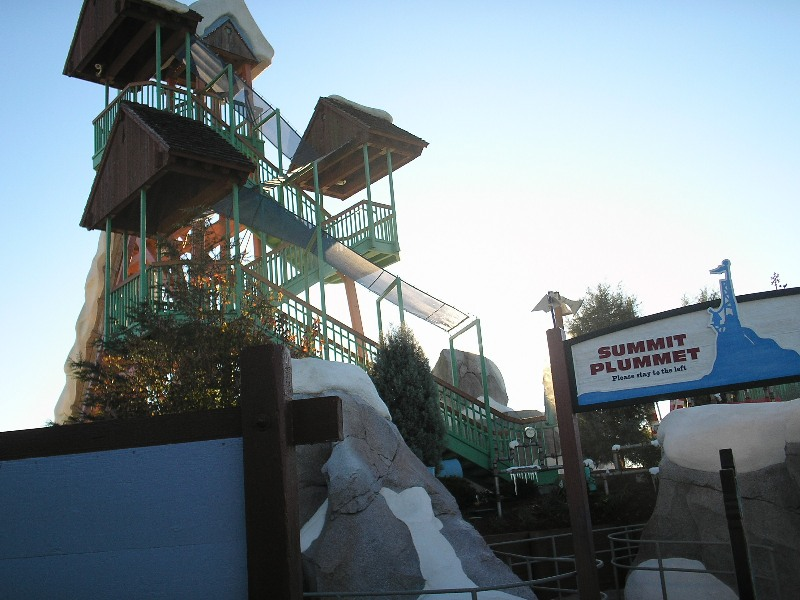
Summit Plummet as seen from the beginning of the line.

- Summit Plummet is the park's flagship attraction at 120 feet (36.6 m) tall and speeds of up to 60 miles per hour (97 km/h). It's the third tallest and fastest free-fall slide in the world. There is a minimum height requirement of 48 in (122 cm). Summit Plummet is one of the highest and fastest water slides on Earth, coming in just behind Insano at Beach Park in Brazil.

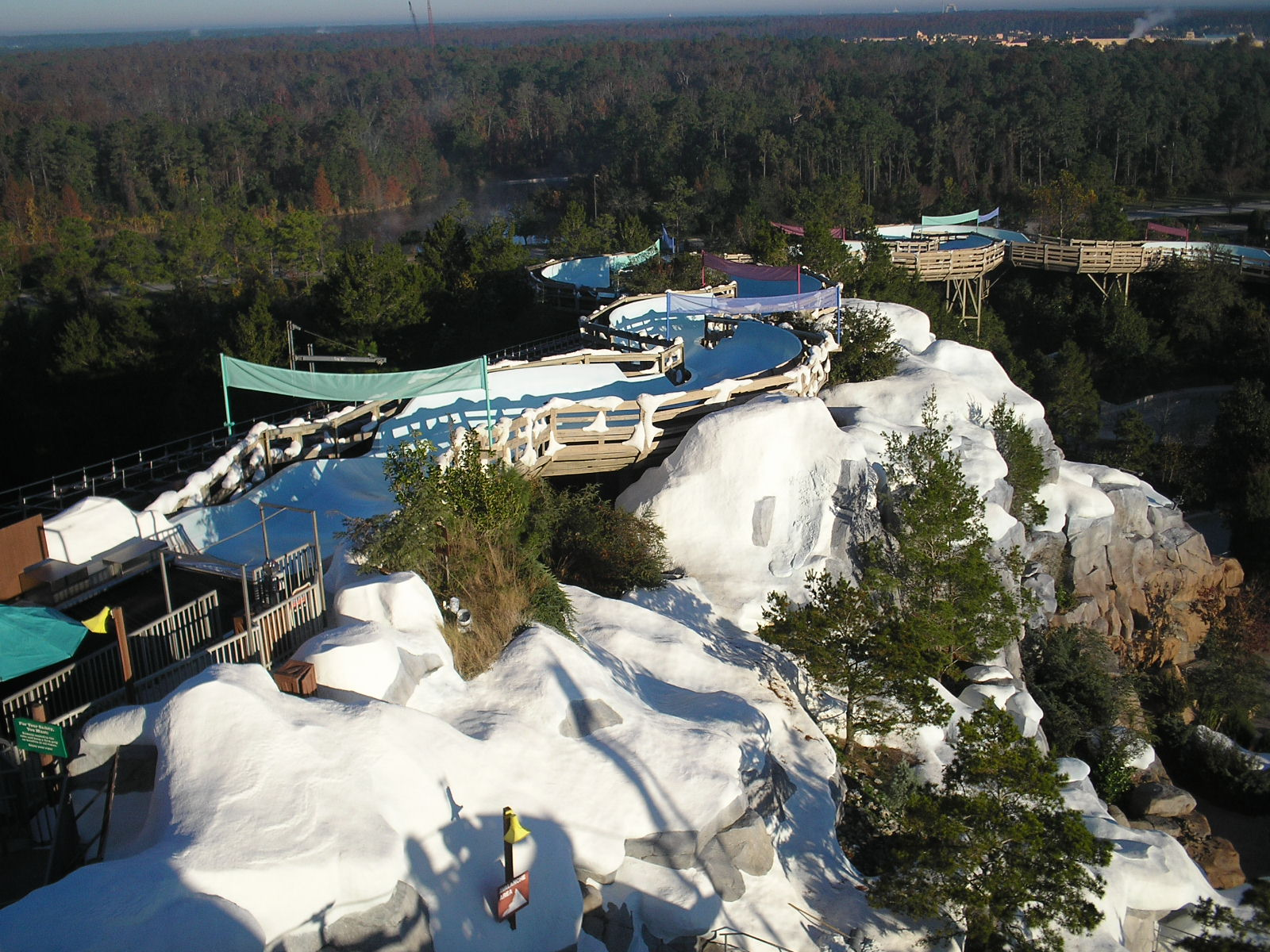
An overview of Teamboat Springs.

- Teamboat Springs is the world's longest family white-water raft ride at 1,400 feet (427 m) long. This attraction sends guests down a twisting series of rushing waterfalls. Water park guests sit in large blue rubber rafts, which can hold a minimum of four and maximum of six people, and hold on to handles while they ride. No infants are allowed, and other health restrictions are advised.
- Slush Gusher is a 90-foot-tall (27.4 m), 250-foot-long (76.2 m) snow-banked mountain gully body slide attraction that reaches speeds up to 35 miles per hour (56 km/h). In two places, the slope levels off, only to drop back down again. As such, it is one of only a few water slides where air time is achieved.

=== Purple Slope ===
The Purple Slope attractions (all of which have at least two nearly identical tracks, and are designed for racing) can be reached via a pathway near the catch pool of Downhill Double Dipper.

- Downhill Double Dipper is one of the world's only side-by-side racing tube slides. It is located next to Snow Stormers on Mount Gushmore. This attraction's slides are 50 feet (15.2 m) high and 230 feet (70.1 m) long. Guests travel up to speeds of 25 mph (40 km/h) on these twin inner tube runs, where they pass by ski racing graphics and flags. Time clocks count off each downhill heat, and the runs are outfitted with automated audio equipment that signals the start of each race. This is one of few racing slides where push-off speed is not a factor, as gates hold back riders until it is time for the race to begin. This attraction has a minimum height requirement of 48 in (122 cm).
- Snow Stormers is a mat slide consisting of three flumes that are 350 feet (106.7 m) long. This attraction sits between Downhill Double Dipper and Toboggan Racers on Mount Gushmore. The attraction descends from the top of the mountain and follows a switchback course through ski-type slalom gates. Guests lie on their stomachs on the toboggan-style mat as they ride down the flumes. Riders pick up mats at the top of the attraction (which shares a mat conveyor with Toboggan Racers).
- Toboggan Racers is an 8-lane, 250-foot (76.2 m) water slide next to Snow Stormers on Mount Gushmore. The attraction sends guests racing over dips as they descend the slope along the side of Mount Gushmore. Similar to Snow Stormers, guests lie on their stomach on the toboggan-style mat as they race each other to the finish line.

=== Red Slope ===
The Red Slope is found at the very rear of the park, containing only one attraction (a multi-slide attraction with convergent tracks, not designed for racing).

- Runoff Rapids is a 600-foot (183 m) inner tube run featuring two open slides and one enclosed tube slide. This attraction sends guests down twisting flumes, passing through corrugated steel pipes. Tubes can be picked up at the bottom of the attraction. The ride is not accessible, as stairs are the only way to reach the attraction. After reopening in 2018, at the completion of a year-long refurbishment, one of the open tube slides was closed down. In 2019, the third tube slide re-opened.

=== Ground level ===
- Melt-Away Bay is a 1-acre (0.40 ha) wave pool at the base of Mount Gushmore. This attraction is constantly fed by "melting snow" waterfalls creating "bobbing" (short) waves.
- Cross Country Creek is a 3,000-foot (914 m) lazy river ride that travels around the perimeter of the water park. The attraction carries floating guests (in inner tubes) through a faux ice cave. Once inside the cave, guests will be splashed with "melting" ice from overhead. There are seven entrances and exits for this attraction located throughout the park, and at any of these locations, guests may pick up tubes or leave them behind as they exit. The journey takes between twenty and thirty minutes to complete depending on crowd level.

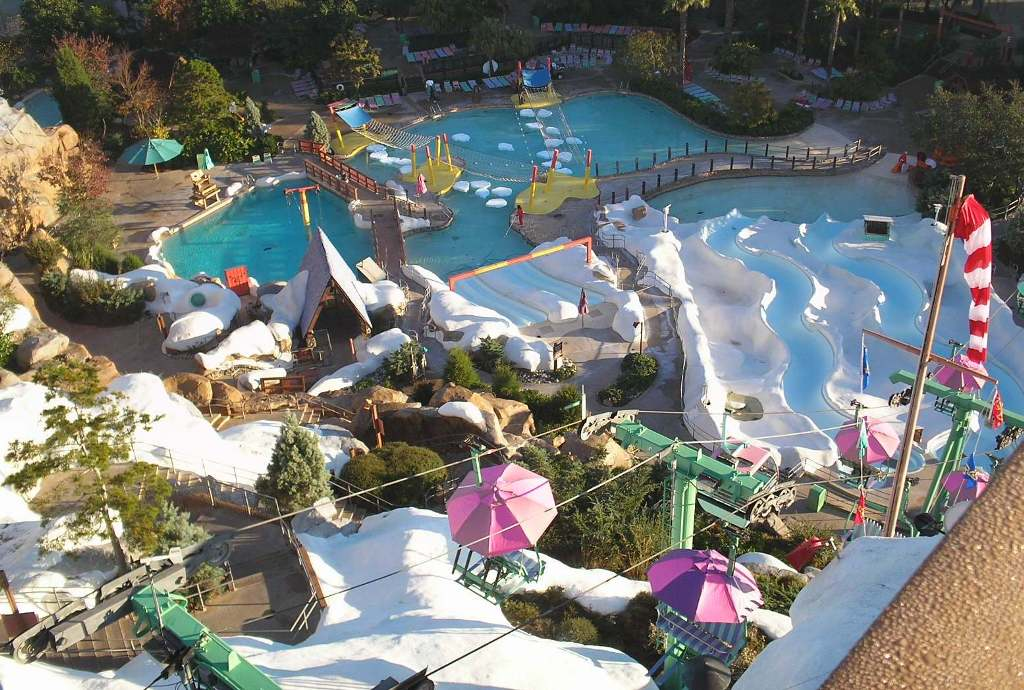
An overview of Ski Patrol and the Chairlift

- Ski Patrol Training Camp is an area for pre-teenage children.
  - Leisure Pool is a pool that contains "icebergs" on which guests under 12 can walk across.
  - Fahrenheit Drops, commonly known as the "T-Bar", is a rope drop attraction that deposits guests that are under five feet (1.52 m) tall into eight point five feet (2.6 m) of water.
  - Freezin' Pipe Springs is a short body slide attraction. It deposits guests in the same water area as Fahrenheit Drops, but has no height restriction.
  - Cool Runners is a wide-open slide (inner tube) area created by rapidly melting snow mounds (moguls). Was formerly occupied by Mogul Mania, which was said to have never opened to the public due to safety concerns.
- Tike's Peak features gentle slides designed to resemble scaled-down versions of attractions at Blizzard Beach and characters from Frozen. Also included is a snow-castle fountain play area with pop (water) jets. Picnic benches are nearby. Management suggest wearing footwear to protect from hot pavement. The attraction is limited to children under 48 in (122 cm).
- The Chairlift is a "one-way" ride that carries up to 3 guests over the craggy face of Mount Gushmore from its base at the beach to its summit. The chairs carrying guests feature wooden bench seats, colorful overhead umbrellas, and snow skis on their undersides. This is the most common means of transport to the summit, but guests can also climb a staircase to the top. A gondola is also provided for disabled guests to access the top of Mount Gushmore. There is a minimum height requirement of 32 in (81 cm) 48 in (122 cm) to ride alone.

==== Food and beverage ====
- Avalunch offers light snacks and refreshments. It is located next to the entrance of the Chairlift.
- Frostbite Freddie's is a bar located adjacent to Snowless Joe's in the Village.
- Lottawatta Lodge is a ski lodge providing outdoor covered seating and is the main counter service area.
- Polar Pub is a bar located on the beach by the wave pool.
- I. C. Expeditions offers ice cream, desserts, and refreshments. It is located near the Chairlift.
- The Cooling Hut offers light snacks and refreshments. It is located in the Village.
- The Warming Hut offers hot food and refreshments.

Coolers are allowed in the water parks. The only restricted items are glass and alcohol. Guests are required to wear swimwear that is "appropriate," and sharp objects are prohibited in the water parks. Children at young ages must wear swim diapers or pants.

==== Merchandises ====
- Shade Shack is a jewelry store featuring pearls. It is located in the Village across from the changing rooms.
- Snowless Joe's is a rental location offering locker and towel rentals and complimentary lifejackets. It is located in the Village next to the changing rooms.
- The Beach Haus is the main merchandise store and rental location for lockers, towels, and life jackets. It also offers souvenirs, swimwear, and footwear. It is located in the Village between the Main Entrance and Lottawatta Lodge.
