= Alys Beach, Florida =

Unincorporated luxury community in Florida, United States

- Unincorporated community
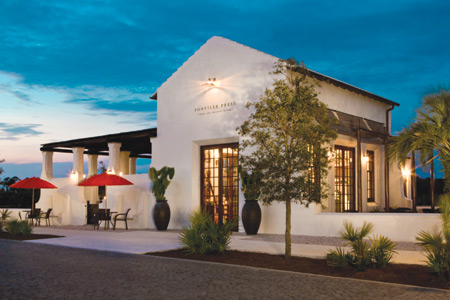
- Fonville Press at Alys Beach

- Location within Florida
- Coordinates: 30.2831°N 86.0244°W
- Country: United States
- State: Florida
- County: Walton

Area
  - Total: 0.64 km^{2} (0.25 sq mi)
- Time zone: UTC-6 (Central (CST))
  - Summer (DST): UTC-5 (CDT)
- ZIP code: 32461
- Area code: 850
- GNIS feature ID: 2054880
- Website: alysbeach.com

Alys Beach is an unincorporated planned community in Walton County, Florida, United States directly off of CR 30A, on the Gulf Coast. Alys Beach plan was designed by Duany Plater-Zyberk & Company. The village is approximately 158 acres (0.247 sq mi; 0.64 km^{2}).

It was named after Alys Stephens, the wife of Elton Bryson Stephens Sr., who purchased the land in the 1970s and began developing the land in 2004.

All of the houses are required to have a white color.

== Location ==
Alys Beach is located on the Gulf of Mexico in southeastern Walton County. U.S. Route 98 and County Road 30A are the main roads that run through the community. Via County Road 30A, Rosemary Beach is less than 2 miles (3.2 km) southeast, and Seaside is 7 miles (11 km) west.

== Design ==
Alys Beach is one of three planned communities on Florida's Gulf coast designed by Andrés Duany and Elizabeth Plater-Zyberk. The other two are Seaside and Rosemary Beach. The three are examples of a style of urban planning known as New Urbanism. The design vision of Alys Beach was based on Moorish and Mediterranean villages and architectural styles of Bermuda. The courtyard's design was inspired by homes in Antigua and Guatemala. The Alys Beach community is constructed following the Fortified for Safer Living standards by the Insurance Institute for Business and Home Safety. Alys Beach has been compared to a Greek Island.

== History ==
Alys Beach modern history began in 1970s, when the Stephens family purchased the 158-acre (64 ha) property at auction. The family had been vacationing in the area for many years, and wanted to provide a permanent retreat for an extended family and their employees. Family patriarch Elton Bryson Stephens Sr. named estate after his wife, Alys Robinson Stephens.

== Education ==
Walton County School District is the local school district. It is zoned to Dune Lakes Elementary School.

== See also ==
- Alys Robinson Stephens Performing Arts Center
- Seaside, Florida
- Rosemary Beach, Florida
- Baldwin Park, Florida
- Celebration, Florida
- Golden Oak at Walt Disney World Resort
- New Urbanism
