= Jeff Vahle =

American businessman

Jeff Vahle is the president of Walt Disney World Resort. He oversees operations for the resort, including four theme parks, multiple water parks, more than 25 resort hotels, a sports complex, and Disney Springs, as well as supporting facilities and services.

Since assuming the role in the early 2020s, Vahle has overseen the opening of several attractions and entertainment offerings at Walt Disney World, including TRON Lightcycle / Run, Guardians of the Galaxy: Cosmic Rewind, Journey of Water (Inspired by Moana), Tiana's Bayou Adventure, and new nighttime shows at Magic Kingdom and EPCOT. During his tenure, the resort has also undergone hotel renovations and expansions, such as the Island Tower at Disney’s Polynesian Villas & Bungalows, along with the addition of new dining locations. Additional large-scale expansion projects across multiple parks are in development.

In addition to his role at Walt Disney World, Vahle oversees Worldwide Safety, Health, Engineering, and Sourcing for Disney Experiences globally. Earlier in his career, he led Disney Signature Experiences, which includes Disney Cruise Line, Disney Vacation Club, Adventures by Disney, and National Geographic Expeditions, and also held leadership positions in facilities and operations services for Disney theme parks worldwide.

Vahle began his career with The Walt Disney Company in 1990 and has held leadership roles in the development and operation of several Disney destinations, including Disney California Adventure Park, Hong Kong Disneyland, and Shanghai Disney Resort.

He serves on the boards of trustees for Rollins College and the University of Central Florida, and is affiliated with the Orlando Economic Partnership and The Florida Council of 100. Vahle earned a bachelor's degree in mechanical engineering from Auburn University and a master's degree in business administration from Rollins College.

As of May 11th of 2026, Vahle posted on his LinkedIn account quote, "I started my career as an engineer at Magic Kingdom and I'm wrapping it up with the best job ever, leading Walt Disney World into a period of remarkable growth in partnership with our incredible cast members and community," As this announcing his retirement from the company and that he would leave the role in late July. He worked for the company for nearly 36 years leading many innovations across Walt Disney World.

== See also ==
- Walt Disney World
- The Walt Disney Company
- Disney Experiences
