= Golden oak (disambiguation) =

Golden oak, Quercus alnifolia, is a species of oak tree.

Golden oak may also refer to:

- Golden Oak at Walt Disney World Resort, Florida
- Golden Oak Ranch, California
