= Seaside, Florida =

- Unincorporated community
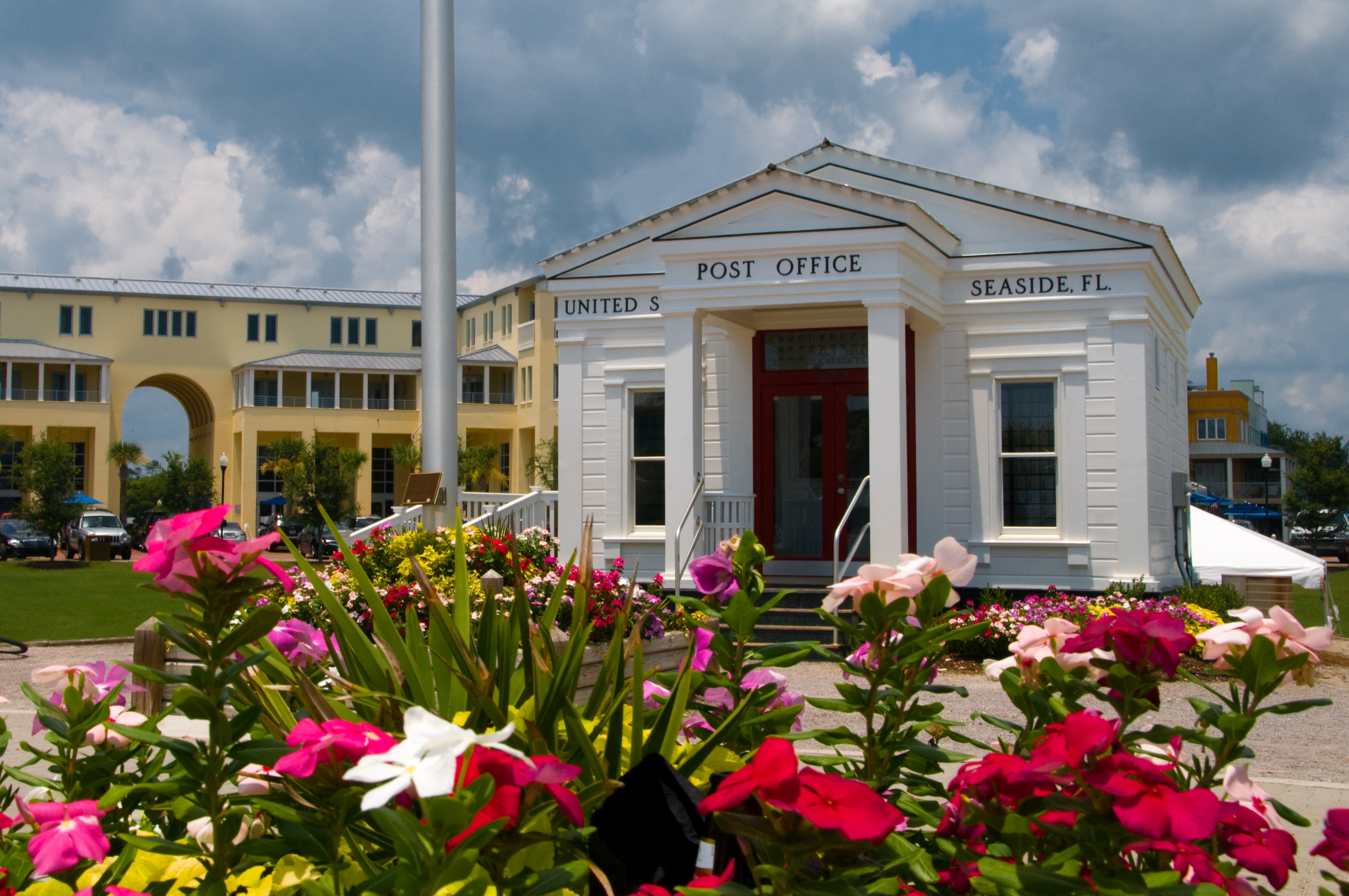
- Seaside Post Office

- Wordmark
- Motto(s): "A simple, beautiful life."
- Location within Florida
- Coordinates: 30.320118°N 86.137705°W
- Country: United States
- State: Florida
- County: Walton
- Elevation: 13 ft (4 m)
- Time zone: UTC-6 (Central (CST))
  - Summer (DST): UTC-5 (CDT)
- ZIP code: 32459
- GNIS feature ID: 1955357

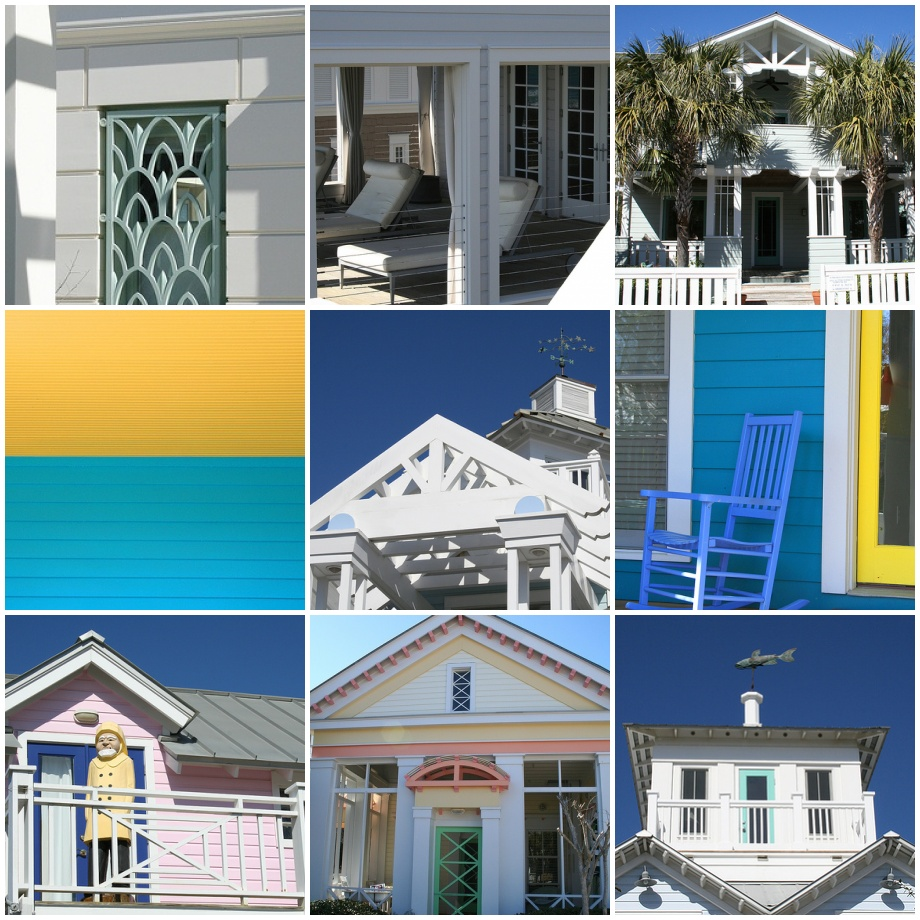
Architectural collage of new urbanist Seaside, Florida

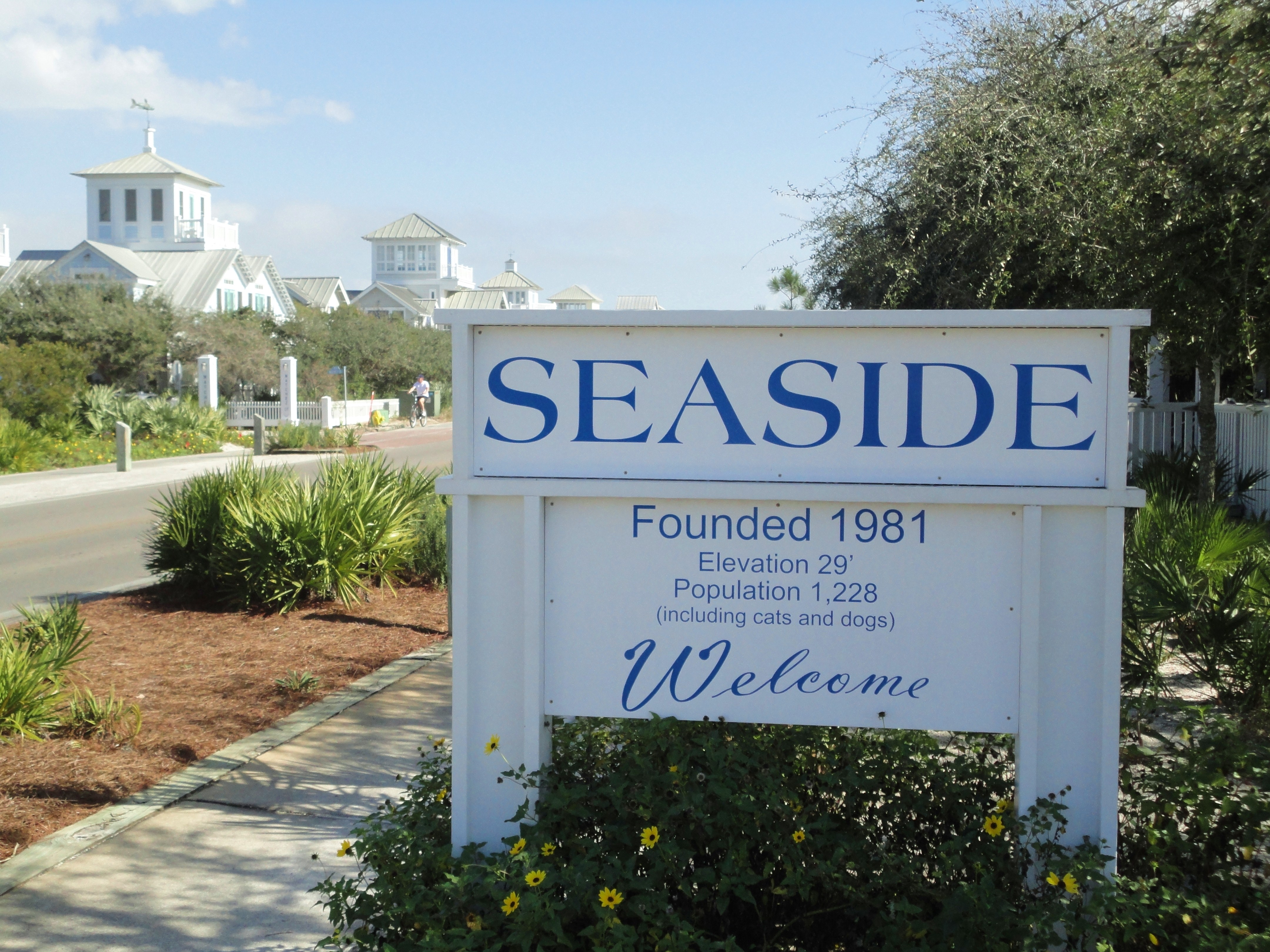
Entrance sign to Seaside, Florida

Seaside is an unincorporated master-planned community in Walton County, Florida, United States. It is situated on the Florida Panhandle between Panama City Beach and Destin. One of the first communities in America designed on the principles of New Urbanism, which promotes walkability and mixed-use developments, the town has become the topic of slide lectures in architectural schools and in housing-industry magazines, and is visited by design professionals from all over the United States. It has been featured in multiple documentaries for its urban design.

== History ==
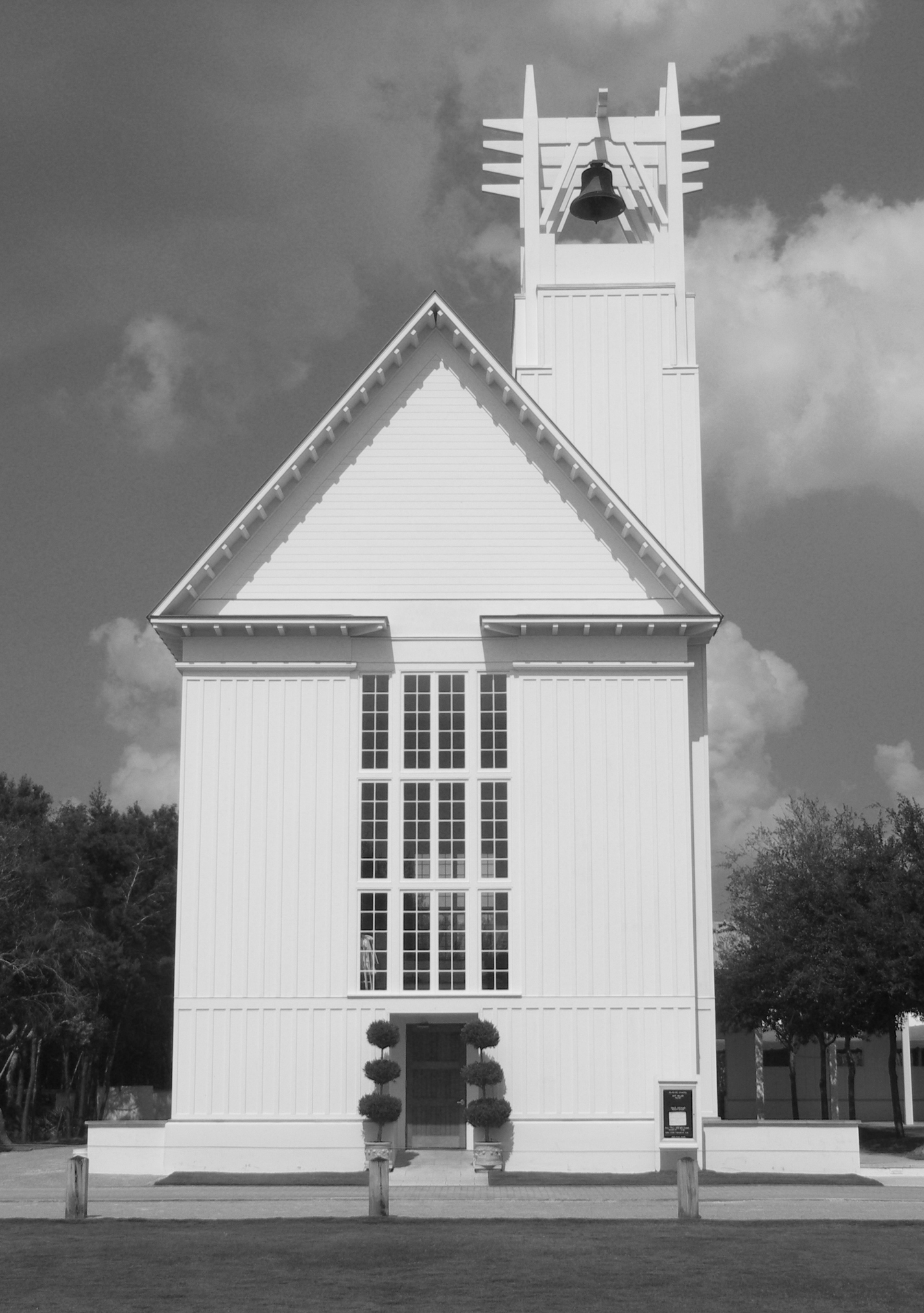
Seaside Chapel, a community landmark designed by Merrill, Pastor, & Colgan in 2001.

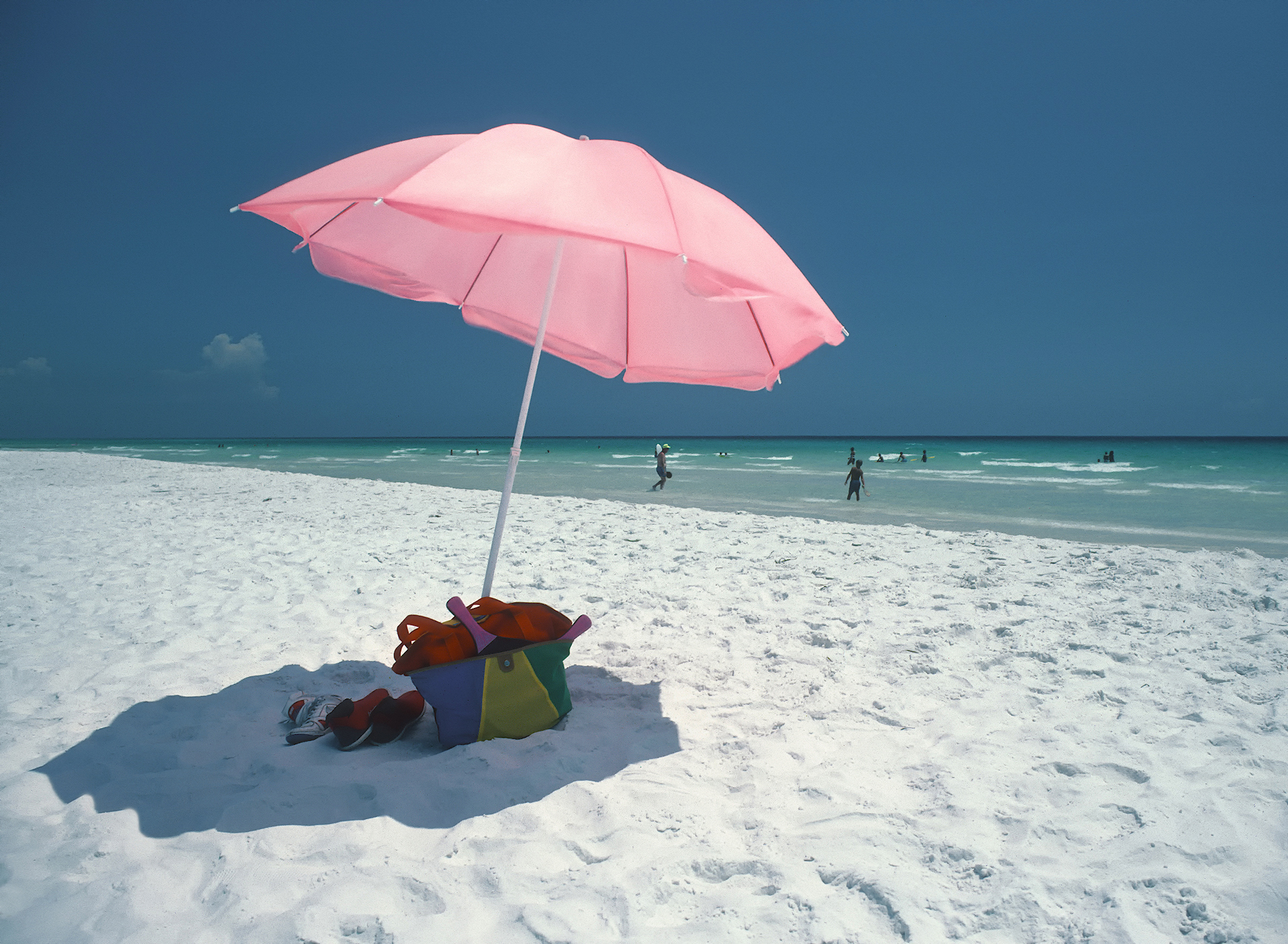
Beach of Seaside

The community was first constructed in 1981.

The idea behind Seaside came in 1946, when the grandfather of future founder Robert S. Davis bought 80 acres (32 ha) of land along the shore of Northwest Florida as a summer retreat for his family.

In 1978, Davis inherited the parcel from his grandfather, and aimed to transform it into an old-fashioned beach town, with traditional wood-framed cottages of the Florida Panhandle. Davis, his wife Daryl, and the architectural partners and Driehaus Prize winners Andrés Duany and Elizabeth Plater-Zyberk of Duany Plater-Zyberk & Company toured the south studying small towns as a basis for planning Seaside. The final plan was complete around 1985.

In 1998, the town was transformed again to provide the set for the film The Truman Show. Several notable locations from the 1998 film starring Jim Carrey can still be visited today.

== Location ==
Seaside is located along County Road 30A immediately adjacent to the Gulf of Mexico. Via County Road 30A, Rosemary Beach is 8 mi (13 km) to the southeast, and Miramar Beach is 16 mi (26 km) to the northwest (via County Road 30A to US 98).

== Design ==
Seaside is one of three planned communities on Florida's Gulf coast designed by Andrés Duany and Elizabeth Plater-Zyberk. The other two are Rosemary Beach and Alys Beach. The three are examples of a style of urban planning known as New Urbanism. As Seaside is privately owned, no other municipal governments had planning jurisdiction over Seaside, and therefore the developers were able to write their own zoning codes.

Individual housing units in Seaside are required to be different from other buildings, with designs ranging from styles such as Victorian, New Classical, Modern, Postmodern, and Deconstructivism. Seaside includes buildings by architects such as Léon Krier, Robert A. M. Stern Steven Holl, Machado and Silvetti Associates, Deborah Berke, Aldo Rossi, Samuel Mockbee, Steve Badanes, and David Coleman. Another Driehaus Prize winner, the architect Scott Merrill, designed the Seaside Chapel, an interfaith chapel and local landmark, along with a number of homes. It also utilized some of the planning ideas created by Charles, then Prince of Wales (later King Charles III).

Seaside has no private front lawns, and only native plants are used in front yards.

== Events ==
During the Annual 30A Songwriters Festival, produced by the Cultural Arts Association of Walton County, singer-songwriters from all over the U.S. perform in venues along Scenic Highway 30A and at a few venues in Seaside itself.

The Seaside Half Marathon and 5K Race is held each year in March, and attracts runners from all across the U.S. This is quickly becoming one of the region's premier running events. The 5K Run is limited to the first 800 people that register and the Half Marathon is limited to the first 2200 that register. The top three runners from each age group receive a prize, and every runner in the half marathon receives a medal upon completing the race. Participants are allowed to walk in either race.

The Seaside Central Square offers a variety of events including movie nights at the Central Square Cinema. Other events include the Seeing Red Wine Festival, a dance festival, a farmers market, and holiday events such as an annual production of The Nutcracker.

== Organizations and institutions ==
=== Escape to Create ===
Escape to Create aims to celebrate artists and serve the community through Multi-Disciplinary Artist Residencies, Visiting Artists and Scholars, Arts and Cultural Programs, and Educational outreach.

=== Seaside Farmers Market ===
On Saturday mornings the Seaside Farmers Market offers fresh local produce, dairy products, baked goods, and native plants. Demonstrations in cooking and gardening are also held on a regular basis.

=== Repertory Theater ===
The Repertory Theater (REP) was founded in the spring of 2001, and serves more than 25,000 people every year. The plays are performed by the only professional theater company on the Emerald Coast, and includes everything from family shows to sophisticated adult content shows. High school students who live in the area can intern at the Seaside Repertory Theater. The program is intended to teach practical knowledge by working with the staff and get to be in charge of their own production.

=== SEASIDE Institute ===
The SEASIDE Institute is a 501c3 non-profit organization located in Seaside, Florida. The organization hosts educational programs throughout the year centered around sustainability, connectivity, and adaptability.

=== Seaside Neighborhood School ===
In 1995 a group of parents and other community members from towns in Walton County, met and discussed how they could improve education within the county. Their discussions focused on making a densely populated school with grades five to eight. In 1996 Seaside Neighborhood School was established. It was Florida's first charter school. The school initially consisted of 50 students and one classroom. In 1998, architect Richard Gibbs designed three white buildings which became the school's site. In order to maintain the small enrollment of children that attend the school, a limited number of students are accepted into each grade. If enrollment exceeds the limit, students names are drawn randomly from a lottery. After the limit has been reached, they continue to pull out names which then creates a school year waiting list. If someone withdraws from the school then the first on the waiting list will be accepted. Children of employees, board members, or siblings of current attendees of the school are automatically admitted. In 2013, Seaside Neighborhood School founded a collegiate high school, called Seacoast Collegiate High School. In its inaugural year, it served 80 students in grades 9 and 10. Grade 11 was added in 2014 and grade 12 was added in the fall of 2015. In August 2014, Seaside Neighborhood School also introduced a fifth grade class.

== Notable residents ==
- Don Gaetz, Florida State Senator
- Matt Gaetz, Former Congressman for Florida

== See also ==
- New Urbanism
- Alys Beach, Florida
- Baldwin Park, Florida
- Carlton Landing, Oklahoma
- Celebration, Florida
- Golden Oak at Walt Disney World Resort
- Rosemary Beach, Florida
