= Scott Merrill =

American architect

- Education: University of Virginia (B.A.); Yale University (M.A.)
- Occupation: Architect
- Awards: Driehaus Architecture Prize

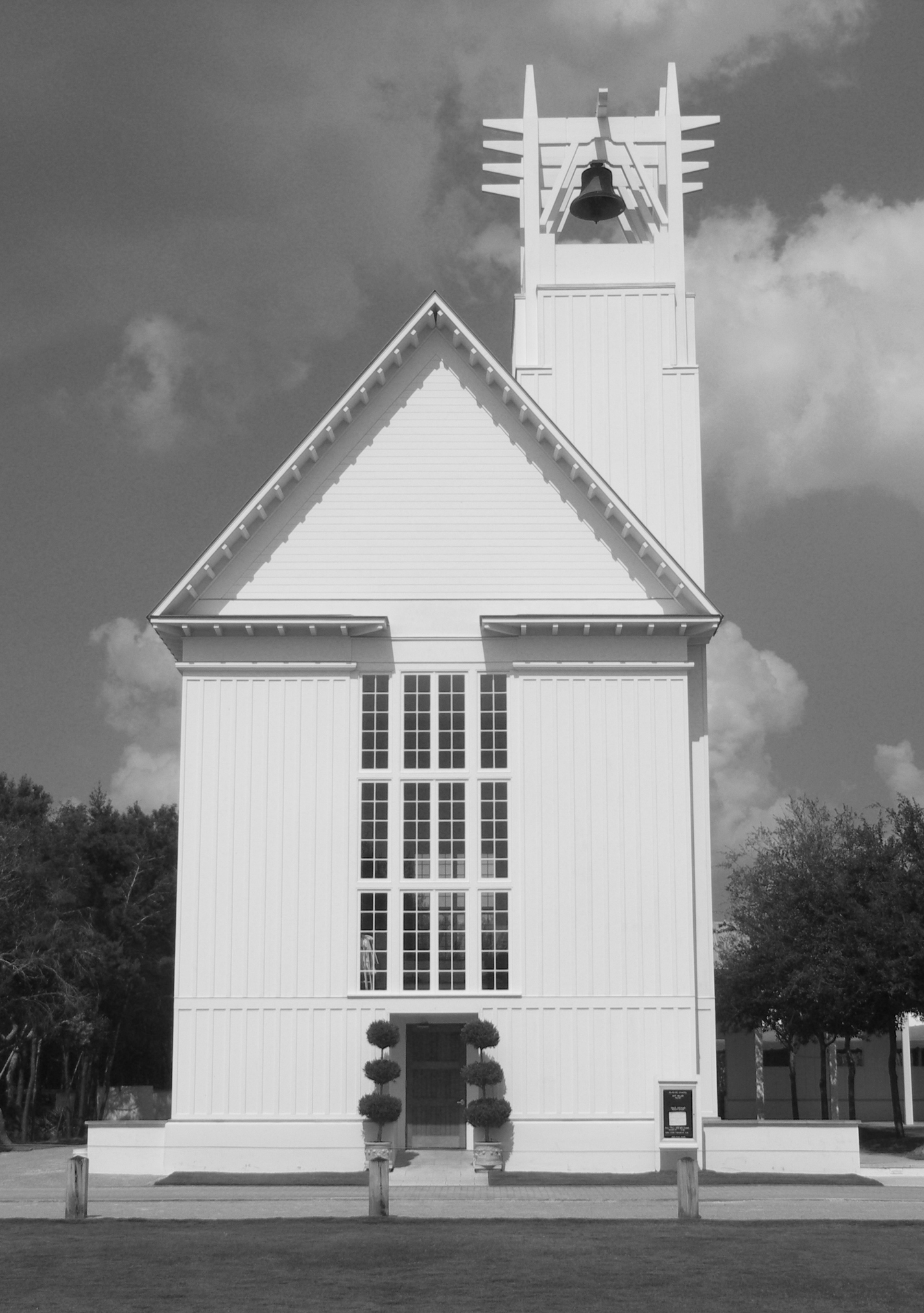
Seaside Chapel in Florida, designed in 2001

Scott Merrill, born in Oxford, Ohio, is an American architect. He is a principal at Merrill, Pastor & Colgan Architects. He was the recipient of the Driehaus Prize in 2016. He has designed many of the buildings in Seaside, Florida, including the "Honeymoon Cottages" project for which he won an AIA national design award in 1991, and he has worked with Leon Krier.
