= David Coleman (architect) =

American architect

David Coleman, FAIA, is an American architect based in Seattle, WA. David was born in New York and studied fine arts and environmental design at Pratt Institute before taking up architecture at the Rhode Island School of Design. He completed his studies at the Royal Danish Academy of Fine Arts, School of Architecture. He founded David Coleman Architecture in 1986. In 2011 David was elected to the American Institute of Architects College of Fellows.

== Profile ==
Born and raised in New York, David Coleman, FAIA, studied fine arts and environmental design at Pratt Institute before taking up architecture at the Rhode Island School of Design. He completed his studies at the Royal Danish Academy of Fine Arts, School of Architecture, focusing on residential and community design.

David has over 30 years of experience in the field and has completed buildings and projects in eight states. Early in his career, David worked in the office of AIA Gold Medalist Michael Graves. He started his own firm in Vermont in 1986 and moved to the Northwest in 1996. He is a registered architect and is NCARB certified for reciprocity in all fifty states.

David's work has received numerous design awards and been widely published in books, magazines and on-line, including Architectural Digest, Architectural Record, Metropolitan Home, The New York Times, and Pacific Northwest. In 1990 he won a prominent commission in the highly acclaimed town of Seaside, Florida. In 1991 he was named one of the 100 foremost architects in the world by Architectural Digest. In 2006 he won the Design Achievement Award for Architecture. In 2011, he was elevated to the American Institute of Architects prestigious College of Fellows, in light of his “significant contribution to architecture and society on a national level”.

David has served on an advisory board for the “House as Architecture” program at the University of Washington, College of Architecture & Urban Planning, where he has lectured, served as guest critic and taught graduate design studio. He has served on a number of advisory boards and committees over the years including the Solar Association of Vermont, the Burlington Waterfront Board, and Allied Arts of Seattle, where he was co-chair of the Urban Environments Committee. In 1989 he was invited to speak at the Governor's Conference on Design & the Built Environment at the Vermont State Capital. An active member of the American Institute of Architects, David has spoken at AIA events and is past co-chair of the AIA Honor Awards for Washington Architecture program.

== Notable Work ==
- Field House
- Sand Point Residence
- Inside Outside House
- Bay View Residence
- Broadmoor Residence
- Bear Run Cabin
- View Ridge Residence
- Stair House
- Hill House
- Coleman Pavilion (Seaside, Florida)
- Buchter Retreat
- Nuler-Cudahy Residence
- Zig Zag Residence
