= Disney Experiences =

Theme park and travel division of The Walt Disney Company

- Formerly: Walt Disney Outdoor Recreation (1980–89); Walt Disney Attractions (1989–2008); Walt Disney Parks and Resorts (2008–18); Walt Disney Parks, Experiences and Consumer Products (2018–19); Disney Parks, Experiences and Products (2019–23)
- Type: Division
- Predecessor: Disney Consumer Products and Interactive Media (2015–2018)
- Founded: April 1, 1971; 55 years ago
- Headquarters: Lake Buena Vista, Florida; Glendale, California, U.S.
- Number of locations: 6
- Area served: United States, China, France, Hong Kong and Japan
- Key people: Thomas Mazloum (chairman)
- Parent: The Walt Disney Company
- Subsidiaries: Adventures by Disney; Aulani; Disney Cruise Line; Disney Store; Disney Vacation Club; Disney's Hilton Head Island Resort; Disneyland Paris; Disneyland Resort; Hong Kong Disneyland Resort (48%); Shanghai Disney Resort (43%); Storyliving by Disney; The Muppets Studio; Walt Disney Imagineering; Walt Disney World Resort
- Website: disneyexperiences.com

Disney Experiences, (Note: Formerly known as Walt Disney Outdoor Recreation, Walt Disney Attractions, Walt Disney Parks and Resorts, Walt Disney Parks, Experiences and Consumer Products, and Disney Parks, Experiences and Products.) commonly known as Disney Parks, is one of the three major business segments of the Walt Disney Company. It oversees Disney's theme parks and resorts, cruise line, vacation ownership businesses, consumer products and other travel and leisure operations.

Disney Parks brand logo

Disney Experiences is led by chairman Thomas Mazloum. Its operations include six resort destinations with 12 theme parks in the United States, France, Japan, China and Hong Kong, as well as Disney Cruise Line, Disney Vacation Club, Adventures by Disney, Aulani and Walt Disney Imagineering. Disney theme parks collectively recorded an estimated 145.2 million visits in 2024, the highest attendance of any theme park group worldwide. Disney Experiences employs more than 185,000 people.

The division traces its origins to Disney's parks organization, established in 1971 ahead of the opening of Walt Disney World. In March 2018, Disney merged its Consumer Products and Interactive Media division with Parks and Resorts to form Walt Disney Parks, Experiences and Consumer Products. It was later renamed Disney Parks, Experiences and Products, before adopting the name Disney Experiences in 2023.

== History ==
=== Early development (1951-1971) ===
Disney's entry into the theme park and travel business began as a side project of Walt Disney. As the proposed Disneylandia project developed, Walt Disney Productions, at Walt's request, established Disneyland, Inc. (DLI) in 1951. In March 1953, DLI entered into a design agreement with WED Enterprises (WED), Walt Disney's privately owned company, which at the time included the operations that would later become Walt Disney Imagineering.

Using WED's concept designs and prospectus for Disneylandia, Roy O. Disney met with television networks in September 1953 to seek financing for the project through a combination of investment in Disneyland and Disney-produced television programming. American Broadcasting-Paramount Theatres (AB-PT) agreed to invest in Disneyland, Inc. Other investors included Walt Disney Productions (WDP), Western Publishing, and Walt Disney personally. Walt Disney Productions held an option to purchase the shares owned by Walt Disney, WED, and Western Publishing, representing 31% of the company, for $562,500 by May 1, 1959.

Because Disney lacked the financing to construct a hotel near the park, Walt Disney approached developer Jack Wrather, who agreed to build the Disneyland Hotel.

The project, by then renamed Disneyland, was announced by Walt Disney in April 1954 and scheduled to open in July 1955. (Note: Walt Disney, by Jim Fanning, 1994. Page 100.) (Note: Walt Disney – Hollywood's Dark Prince, by Marc Eliot, 1993. Page 223.) Disneyland opened on July 17, 1955, with five themed "lands" and eighteen attractions. Attendance on opening day was approximately twice the number expected. (Note: Walt Disney, by Jim Fanning, 1994. Page 102.) The Santa Fe & Disneyland Railroad, owned by WED Enterprises, also began operations with the park.

On June 29, 1957, Walt Disney Productions exercised its options to acquire all outstanding common stock in Disneyland, Inc. except the shares held by AB-PT. The transaction allowed Walt Disney Productions to consolidate Disneyland, Inc. into its 1957 financial statements, adding four months of net income totaling approximately $511,000.

In June 1960, Walt Disney Productions purchased AB-PT's remaining interest in Disneyland, Inc. for nearly $7.5 million and acquired the related television contract, making the theme park company a wholly owned subsidiary of Walt Disney Productions.

Beginning in 1958, Walt Disney Productions began exploring locations for a second Disney resort, commissioning Economics Research Associates (ERA) to identify possible sites. ERA recommended Florida, and a further study in 1961 identified Ocala and Orlando as potential locations. In November 1963, Walt Disney traveled to Florida to make the final site selection. (Note: Walt Disney – An American Original, by Bob Thomas, 1994.)^{:333, 334}

In 1962, Walt Disney Productions purchased the Celebrity Sports Center in Denver, Colorado, which had opened on September 17, 1960. Its owners included Walt Disney, Art Linkletter, and John Payne. Disney intended to use the facility as a staff training center for its planned second resort.

In 1963, Roy O. Disney began planning the purchase of between 5,000 and 10,000 acres (2,000 and 4,000 ha) in Florida. Land acquisition began the following year, and by October 1965 Disney had assembled approximately 27,443 acres (11,106 ha). (Note: Building a Company – Roy O. Disney and the Creation of an Entertainment Empire, by Bob Thomas, 1998. Pages 278, 279, 281–282.) (Note: Walt Disney – An American Original, by Bob Thomas, 1994. Page 337.) Plans for the project that would become Walt Disney World were publicly announced in November 1965.

The Reedy Creek Improvement Act, which established the Reedy Creek Improvement District, was signed into law by Florida Governor Claude R. Kirk, Jr. on May 12, 1967, giving Disney broad authority to develop infrastructure for the new resort. Groundbreaking for the future resort followed on May 30. In 1968, in one of his final acts as CEO, Roy O. Disney officially named the development Walt Disney World.^{:357}

Meanwhile, Disney continued expanding beyond California. Disneyland International was incorporated on November 20, 1961. The following year, The Oriental Land Company approached Disney about developing a theme park in Japan.

At Disneyland, the WED-owned Disneyland-Alweg Monorail System began operations in 1959. The first Audio-Animatronic attraction, Walt Disney's Enchanted Tiki Room, opened in 1963. Disneyland's first new themed land, New Orleans Square, opened in 1966, followed by a major redevelopment of Tomorrowland in 1967 that introduced seven new attractions. The design and architectural operations of WED Enterprises were also purchased from Walt Disney's privately owned company, which was subsequently renamed Retlaw Enterprises.

Disney also participated in the 1964 New York World's Fair, where it developed attractions including It's a Small World and presented costumed Disney characters. Their popularity at the fair encouraged Walt Disney to pursue additional live character entertainment, leading Disneyland to produce Disney on Parade, a touring arena show that began in 1969.

It's a Small World operated for two years at the World's Fair before being moved to Disneyland in 1966 as an expanded attraction. Versions of the attraction were later built at other Disney theme parks.

In 1965, Walt Disney won a bid from the United States Forest Service to develop a ski resort at Mineral King in California. The Sierra Club filed suit in June 1969 in an effort to stop the project, and a federal district judge initially blocked the development. The Forest Service successfully appealed the ruling, including before the Supreme Court, but the decision allowed the Sierra Club to refile the case. In subsequent litigation, the same district judge again blocked the development. The continuing legal dispute, together with the passage of the National Environmental Policy Act, ultimately led Disney to abandon the project.

To finance the development of Walt Disney World, Walt Disney Productions sold $40 million in convertible debentures in January 1968. In February 1969, Disney reached an agreement with several labor unions under which the unions gave up the right to strike during the initial construction phase in exchange for regular wage increases. By 1971, Dick Nunis, chairman of the Park Operations Committee and vice president of park operations, had been appointed executive vice president of Disneyland and Walt Disney World.

=== Expansion and international development (1971-1984) ===
Walt Disney World opened on October 1, 1971, with the Magic Kingdom, which had cost approximately $400 million to develop. The park opened with six themed lands: Main Street, Adventureland, Fantasyland, Frontierland, Liberty Square, and Tomorrowland. The resort also opened with Disney's Fort Wilderness Resort & Campground, Disney's Contemporary Resort, and Disney's Polynesian Village Resort.

Disneyland continued to expand during the 1970s. Bear Country, the park's seventh themed land, opened in 1972 on the site of Frontierland's former Indian Village and was later renamed Critter Country. Space Mountain opened at Disneyland in 1977. In 1979, Disneyland's crafts and maintenance workers went on strike for 15 days, initially rejecting and later accepting the park's proposed contract.

Walt Disney World also expanded rapidly during the decade. Two additional hotels opened in 1973: the Golf Resort and the Gold Resort. Disney opened the Buena Vista Club golf club in Lake Buena Vista on November 22, 1974.^{:71} Lake Buena Vista Village, a shopping complex, opened on March 22, 1975, and was renamed Walt Disney World Village in 1977.^{:280} The Celebrity Sports Center, which had served as a training facility for Walt Disney World, was sold on March 29, 1979.

At Walt Disney World, the Treasure Island nature preserve opened on April 8, 1974, (Note: Disney A to Z – The Updated Official Encyclopedia, by Dave Smith, 1998.)^{:569} and was renamed Discovery Island in 1977.^{:126} The WEDway PeopleMover opened in the Magic Kingdom's Tomorrowland on July 1, 1975. (Note: Disney Magazine, Summer 1999. Page 85.) Disney's first water park, River Country, opened at Walt Disney World on June 20, 1976. (Note: Birnbaum's Walt Disney World 1997, by Hearst Business Publishing, 1996.)^{:22} Groundbreaking for EPCOT Center took place in May 1979. (Note: Walt Disney World, by The Walt Disney Company, 1994?.)

In 1979, Oriental Land and Disney reached an agreement to develop a Disney theme park in Japan. Tokyo Disneyland opened on April 15, 1983, on a 200 acres (80 ha) site in Urayasu, Chiba, Japan.

With the retirement of Donn Tatum as Walt Disney Productions' Chairman and CEO on June 3, 1980, three divisions were formed, including the Walt Disney Outdoor Recreation Division, of which Disney Legend Dick Nunis was named division president. (Note: The New York Times, June 4, 1980. Page D1.)

On June 1, 1982, the Walt Disney World monorail line was extended to EPCOT Center from the Transportation and Ticket Center.^{:338} The EPCOT Center theme park opened on October 1, 1982, at a building cost of US$1.2 billion, with two areas, Future World and World Showcase.^{:272}

=== Expansion under Michael Eisner (1984-2005) ===
Tishman Company's plans for two Walt Disney World hotels were rejected by the new CEO Michael Eisner on September 30, 1984, marking a change in Disney architecture. New plans for the Dolphin and Swan hotels were submitted by Michael Graves in July 1986; (Note: Building a Dream – The Art of Disney Architecture, by Beth Dunlop, 1996. Pages 63,66.) ground breaking took place on January 28, 1988. (Note: The New York Times, January 28, 1988. Page C1.) The first non-Disney owned hotel, Pickett Suite Resort, opened in Disney World Village on March 15, 1987. (Note: Disney A to Z – The Official Encyclopedia, by Dave Smith, 1996. Page 387.)

Plans for a Hollywood-style theme park were announced in April 1985 for the Walt Disney World resort at a project cost of US$300 million. (Note: Prince of the Magic Kingdom, by Joe Flower, 1991.) In April 1985, Disney signed a licensing agreement with Metro-Goldwyn-Mayer (MGM), giving Disney the right to use the MGM name, logo and movie library for this third park. Construction of the Disney-MGM Studios theme park began in 1986. (Note: Walt Disney World – 20 Magical Years, by the Walt Disney Company, 1991/2?.) Disney-MGM Studios opened on May 1, 1989, (Note: Page D5. The New York Times, May 1, 1989, Volume 138, Number 47857.) along with a Pleasure Island entertainment area; (Note: Birnbaum's Walt Disney World 1997, by Hearst Business Publishing, 1996. Page 18.) its second water park, Disney's Typhoon Lagoon, opened on June 1. (Note: Orlando Attractions, Summer 2009. Page 33.) In 1983, Walt Disney World Village's name was changed to the Disney Village Marketplace. (Note: Disney A to Z – The Official Encyclopedia, by Dave Smith, 1996. Page 132.) A new themed area, Mickey's Birthdayland, opened in the Magic Kingdom near Fantasyland on June 18, 1988. (Note: Disney A to Z – The Official Encyclopedia, by Dave Smith, 1996. Page 324.)

Disneyland started using Disney Dollars on May 5, 1987, while Walt Disney World parks started with Epcot on October 2. A renegotiated Disneyland Japan royalty agreement in April 1988 by Chief Financial Officer Gary L. Wilson netted Disney US$723 million in cash in exchange for lower royalty payments.

The steam railroad and monorail at Disneyland were purchased from Retlaw Enterprises, formerly WED Enterprises, in 1982. Bear Country was renamed Critter Country on November 23, 1988.

In 1987, Disney and Ron Brierley's Industrial Equity (Pacific) Ltd., already a 28% owner of the Wrather Corporation, agreed to purchase the remaining Wrather Corporation stock with a 50% share each. Wrather Corporation owned the Disneyland Hotel and operated the Queen Mary and Spruce Goose tourist attractions. In March 1988, Disney purchased Industrial Equity's half of Wrather Corporation.

In 1985, Premier Cruise Line became the licensed partner cruise line with Disney. This allowed Disney characters on their ships and combined cruise, hotel, and theme park packages.

The Walt Disney Outdoor Recreation Division was incorporated as Walt Disney Attractions, Inc. on August 10, 1989. In January 1990, Disney CEO Eisner announced plans to expand both Disneyland (by 20% in 10 years) (Note: The New York Times, January 13, 1990. Page 37.) and Walt Disney World (WDW). The plan would have WDW add another theme park and 16 new attractions in Disney-MGM Studios. (Note: The New York Times, January 16, 1990. Page D8.) Disney and The Coca-Cola Company agreed to a 15-year marketing contract on January 25: Coca-Cola products would be exclusive in Disney theme parks, and Coca-Cola would use some Disney characters in their ads. (Note: The New York Times, January 26, 1990. Page D4.) On March 16, 1990, Attractions president Nunis announced a 25-year plan for a 4,400-acre (1,800 ha) development in Osceola, Florida, with homes, shopping malls and industrial buildings. (Note: The New York Times, March 17, 1990. Page 37.)

In 1990, the possibility of a West Coast version of Epcot Center was placed in development. (Note: Business Week, January 29, 2001. Page 58.) This was announced as WestCOT in 1991, to be placed at the Disneyland Resort. On July 31, 1990, a new 350-acre (140 ha) ocean-themed park and resort, Port Disney, was announced for Long Beach. Port was to have a cruise-ship terminal, five hotels, restaurants, and shopping areas, costing $2 billion to build. (Note: The New York Times, August 1, 1990. Page D4.) On December 12, 1991, Disney selected only one California project to go forward with, Disneyland Resort, which was to include the WestCOT Center, hotels, a shopping mall, and a lake. (Note: The New York Times, December 13, 1991. Page D1.) Port Disney was abandoned in March 1992, and Disney canceled its leases on the Queen Mary and Spruce Goose attractions picked up from the Wrather Corporation. (Note: The New York Times, March 7, 1992. Page 49.) Mickey's Toontown, a new themed land at Disneyland, opened on January 24, 1993. (Note: Walt Disney – Hollywood's Dark Prince, by Marc Eliot, 1993. Page 279.) Disney canceled its plans for WestCOT in mid-1995 due to financial issues at Disneyland Paris and the park's projected high cost. That park was then replaced by plans for the California Adventure park, hotels, and a retail district.

At Walt Disney World, Mickey's Birthdayland closed on April 22, 1991, then reopened on May 26 as Mickey's Starland. (Note: Disney A to Z – The Official Encyclopedia, by Dave Smith, 1996.)^{324, 329, 333} In order to expand Disney World on wetland, on April 23, 1993, the company agreed to form an 8,500-acre (3,400 ha) wilderness preserve in Florida, known as the Disney Wilderness Preserve. (Note: Disney Magazine, Summer 2001. Page 39.) The Disney Inn hotel was leased starting February 1, 1994, by the US Army, then purchased on January 12, 1996, and later renamed Shades of Green.^{130} Planet Hollywood opened a location in Pleasure Island on December 17, 1994. (Note: The Disney Magazine, Fall 1995, Volume 30, Number 4. Page 43.) The third water park at Walt Disney World, Disney's Blizzard Beach, opened on April 1, 1995. (Note: Birnbaum's Walt Disney World 1997, by Hearst Business Publishing, 1996. Page 192.) The Magic Kingdom's Tomorrowland was completely refurbished and reopened in June 1995. (Note: Building a Dream – The Art of Disney Architecture, by Beth Dunlop, 1996. Page 192.) Taking up a corner of the Magic Kingdom parking lot, the Walt Disney World Speedway opened on November 28, 1995. (Note: Walt Disney World Speedway. Disney A to Z – The Updated Official Encyclopedia, by Dave Smith, 1998. Page 597.) In 1996, the Disney Institute opened on February 9, (Note: Birnbaum's Walt Disney World 1997, by Hearst Business Publishing, 1996. Page 181.) and Disney's BoardWalk opened on July 1. (Note: Boardwalk. Page 62. (1996). Disney A to Z – The Official Encyclopedia, by Dave Smith.) The first of the World of Disney stores opened in the Disney Village Marketplace on October 3. (Note: Smith, Dave. World of Disney. Page 62. (1999). Disney A to Z – The Updated Official Encyclopedia.) The Downtown Disney district opened in November 1997, combining Disney Village Marketplace and Pleasure Island. (Note: Disney Magazine, Spring 1998. Page 31.) A fourth theme park, Disney's Animal Kingdom, opened at Disney World the week of April 20, 1998.

The first Disney Vacation Club Resorts, Vacation Club Resort, opened on October 1, 1991, and was renamed Disney's Old Key West Resort in January 1996. These vacation club hotels were operated by Disney Vacation Developments, Inc. as vacation timeshares. (Note: The Disney Magazine, Spring 1996, Volume 31, Number 2. Page 18.: Disney A to Z – The Updated Official Encyclopedia, by Dave Smith, 1998. Page 584.) The first off-resort vacation club hotel was Vacation Club Resort, which opened on October 1, 1995, in Vero Beach, Florida. (Note: "Vacation Club Resort, Vero Beach, Florida". Page 584. Disney A to Z – The Updated Official Encyclopedia, by Dave Smith, 1998. Via Chronology of Walt Disney Company (End of 1994).)

In 1993, Premier Cruises discontinued its partnership with Disney for one with Warner Bros. After failing to reach agreements with Carnival or Royal Caribbean, Disney announced in 1994 the formation of its cruise line. The Disney Cruise Line launched with the Disney Magic ship in 1998 along with its exclusive resort island port of Castaway Cay.

Disney reportedly had plans to build a park named Disney's America. The park was to have been located in Haymarket, Virginia; 2,300 acres (930 ha) of property were purchased from Exxon in 1993. (Note: Work in Progress, by Michael Eisner, 1998. Page 321.) The history-themed park was announced on November 11, 1993. The plans for the 3,000 acres (1,200 ha) called for a 150-acre (61 ha) amusement park, a campground, a golf course, 2 million square feet (190,000 m^{2}) of office/commercial space, and 2500 homes. (Note: The New York Times, November 12, 1993. Page A14.) With projections indicating that the park would operate at a loss and with opposition in the press, Disney canceled the project on September 15, 1994. (Note: Disney War, by James Stewart, 2005. Page 190.)

Walt Disney Imagineering created Disney Fair, a U.S. traveling attraction, which premiered in September 1996. The fair was poorly attended and was pulled after a few stops. Disney Entertainment Projects (Asia Pacific) Inc., a new Disney Asian Pacific subsidiary, selected a renamed fair called DisneyFest as its first project, taking it to Singapore to open there on October 30, 1997.

In November 1995, Disney announced the building of Tokyo DisneySea, to be owned by Oriental along with Tokyo Disneyland. Oriental and Disney signed the DisneySea licensing agreement in November 1997; the theme park was scheduled to open in 2001 at a cost of $2.6 billion.

In December 1998, Walt Disney Attractions added Disneyland Paris, Disney Regional Entertainment and Walt Disney Imagineering to its portfolio, which already held Walt Disney World, Disney Cruise Line, Disneyland, and Tokyo Disneyland. Chairman Dick Nunis retired at the same time. On October 31, 1999, Walt Disney Attractions, Inc. was merged into Walt Disney Attractions, LLC.

On June 19, 1998, Disney Regional Entertainment opened its first DisneyQuest, a location-based entertainment venue, at Downtown Disney West Side in Walt Disney World. The first DisneyQuest outside of a resort was opened in Chicago on June 16, 1999, with plans for more locations worldwide.

In 1999, plans were announced for a new resort in Hong Kong, Hong Kong Disneyland, as a joint venture, Hong Kong International Theme Parks Ltd., between the Hong Kong Government and Disney Resorts. The Disney Wonder cruise ship began operation on August 15. Disney World's Discovery Island was closed on April 8, 1999.

Walt Disney Attractions, LLC changed its name to Walt Disney Parks and Resorts, LLC on April 14, 2000, then to Disney Destinations, LLC on April 25, 2006. Tokyo DisneySea at Tokyo Disney Resort opened on September 4, 2001. The Walt Disney Company sold its Disney Stores in Japan to Oriental Land in 2002, and most North American stores were sold and licensed to The Children's Place in 2004. The company kept the Disney Stores in Europe, along with the store in Manhattan, which was converted into a World of Disney store run by Walt Disney Parks and Resorts.

Downtown Disney opened at the Disneyland Resort on January 12, 2001, between Disneyland and the future California Adventure. (Note: Pages 23,28. Disney Magazine. Fall 2000. Accessed on April 18, 2016.: Page 16. Disney Magazine, Winter 2000–2001.) Disney California Adventure opened at the Disneyland Resort on February 8, 2001, with three major areas: Paradise Pier, Hollywood Pictures Backlot, and the Golden State. In California Adventure on October 6, 2002, A Bug's Land area opened. (Note: http://kpolsson.com/disnehis/disn2002.htm Disney Magazine, Spring 2003, Volume 8, Number 2. Page 29.) Parks and Resorts chairman Jay Rasulo announced at Disney's D23 Expo in Anaheim, California on September 12, 2009, that Walt Disney World's Fantasyland would be overhauled and increased in size by 2013. (Note: Orlando Attractions, Winter 2010. Page 33. Accessed on April 18, 2016.) A $1 billion expansion/renovation of Disney California Adventure was announced in 2007 to be completed by 2012.

River Country water park closed on November 2, 2001. (Note: Disney Twenty-three, Fall 2011, Volume 3, Issue 3.) Disney-MGM Studios is renamed Disney's Hollywood Studios in January 2008. Pleasure Island's core remaining six nightclubs were closed down in late 2008 to change the area to match the family friendly make-up of the other two sections of Downtown Disney at Disney World.

Walt Disney Studios Park opened March 16, 2002, as the second theme park at the renamed Disneyland Resort Paris. The first park was renamed Disneyland Park (DLP). (Note: Disney Magazine. Winter 2001–2002. Page 22.: Disney Magazine, Spring 2002. Page 28.; Disney Magazine, Winter 2002, Volume 8, Number 1. Page 54.; Stewart, James (2005). Disney War. Page 387.; Jody Revenson (editor), 2006. Disney Insider Yearbook 2005 Year in Review. Page 81. Accessed on April 19, 2016.) DLP Paris opened Toy Story Playland in August 2000 with three attractions.

=== Global expansion and restructuring (2005-2018) ===
Construction on Hong Kong Disneyland began on January 12, 2003, then opened September 12, 2005. (Note: Disney Magazine, Summer 2005, Volume 10, Number 3. Page 33. Accessed on April 19, 2016.: Jody Revenson (editor), 2006. Disney Insider Yearbook 2005 Year in Review. Page 5.) Groundbreaking occurred at Hong Kong Disneyland in December 2009 for a three land expansion: Mystic Point, Grizzly Gulch, and Toy Story Land. (Note: Orlando Attractions. Spring 2010, Volume 3, Number 2. Page 61. Accessed on April 19, 2016.)

In June 2005, Disney Magic made the first cruise outside of the Caribbean, by moving its port for the summer to Los Angeles with a Mexican Riviera schedule. Disney Cruise Line ordered a new 2 ships class from Meyer Werft shipyard in Germany by February 22, 2007. (Note: Oars & Ears. December 2006, Volume 7, Number 9. Page 7. Accessed on April 19, 2016.) The Magic in May 2007 transferred its homeport to Barcelona, Spain, for the lines' first summer Mediterranean itinerary then returned to its permanent port in September.

The Chicago DisneyQuest location was closed in September 2001. Disney Parks started the Adventures by Disney tour vacation business in 2005. Disney entered a float, "The Most Magical Celebration on Earth", into the 2006 Pasadena Tournament of Roses parade. (Note: Jody Revenson (editor), 2006. Disney Insider Yearbook 2005 Year in Review. Page 5. Accessed on April 19, 2016.)

In October 2007, Disney announced plans to build a resort at Ko Olina Resort & Marina in Kapolei, Hawaii, featuring both a hotel and Disney Vacation Club timeshare units. The 800-unit property, named Aulani, opened in 2011 and joined the other resorts not associated with a theme park, such as Disney's Hilton Head Island Resort in South Carolina.

With the Walt Disney World Millennium Celebration starting on October 1, 2000, sanctioned Disney pin trading was started. (Note: Orlando Attractions . Volume 2, Number 1. Page 32. December 2008. Accessed on April 18, 2016.) (Note: Eyes & Ears. Volume 29, Number 38. Page 5. September 23, 1999. Accessed on April 18, 2016.) In 2001, the Themed Entertainment Association gave Disney Parks and Resorts the Thea Award for Breakthrough Innovation for the park's FastPass system. (Note: Strodder, Chris. (2008). The Disneyland Encyclopedia . Page 166. Accessed on April 19, 2016.)

Walt Disney Parks and Resorts Worldwide, Inc. was incorporated on September 29, 2008, and took over the parks and resorts business segment. Disney Parks and Resorts reorganized in early 2009 which included layoffs in all units due to recession-induced falling attendance. 600 U.S. managers in January were offered buyout packages. Worldwide Operations was formed under President Al Weiss in 2009. Worldwide Operations would take over various back-office functions previously performed by both Disney World and Disneyland including training, procurement, menu planning, and merchandise development, while its Walt Disney Imagineering subsidiary combined its three development units.

In November 2009, Disney received approval from the Chinese government to build a Disneyland resort in Shanghai's Pudong district. The resort opened on June 16, 2016.

California Adventure completed its overhaul in 2012 adding two new lands: Cars Land and Buena Vista Street. The overhaul also included a re-theme of several attractions plus a pair of classic dark rides. In July 2017, it was announced that Paradise Pier land would be replaced by Pixar Pier, with four neighborhoods, and the remainder not in Pixar Pier would be replaced by Paradise Park. Pixar Pier opened on June 23, 2018.

Star Wars: Galaxy's Edge, a 14-acre (5.7 ha) themed land for both Disneyland and Disney's Hollywood Studios was announced at the D23 Expo on August 15, 2015. Construction began at both locations on April 14, 2016. The lands at both parks opened in 2019.

The New Fantasyland at Magic Kingdom opened on December 6, 2012. It is the biggest upgrade to the theme park since its opening in 1971. Announced along with its new Star Wars Land expansion at the D23 Expo on August 15, 2015, Hollywood Studios was slated to have a version of Toy Story Land.

Holz became president of New Vacation Operations of Parks & Resorts reporting to Al Weiss, president of worldwide operations for Walt Disney Parks and Resorts. by April 2008. In February 2009, Holz returned to the presidency of Disney Cruise Line in addition to his continuing as head of New Vacation Operations, which was primarily Adventures by Disney. As an extension of the "One Disney" initiative and the resignation of Weiss, Disney Vacation Club was added to New Vacation Operations. While Holz and Meg Crofton joined Disney Parks and Resorts executive committee in July 2011. At that time, Crofton was transferred from Disney World president to president of operations in the U.S. and France, a new positions.

The Disney Dream ship began service in January 2011 and Disney Cruise Line (DCL) announced the maiden voyage of the Disney Fantasy to be March 31, 2012. The Dream deployment allowed Disney Wonder to be stationed at Port of Los Angeles for Mexican Riviera cruises, but initial served in the short Alaska cruise season. Magic moved to New York for Canadian or Bahama cruises starting May 25, 2012. (Note: Cruise Travel. July 2011, Volume 33, Number 1. Page 36.) DCL's Magic was refitted in late 2013.

The first of three expansion theme lands at Hong Kong Disneyland, Toy Story Land, opened on November 18, 2011. Grizzly Gulch opened at Hong Kong Disneyland on July 13, 2012. The final land of this expansion, Mystic Point, opened at Hong Kong Disneyland on May 17, 2013.

On February 5, 2015, it was announced that Tom Staggs had been promoted to Disney Company Chief operating officer but would continue as chairman of Parks and Resorts until his successor was named. On February 23, 2015, Robert Chapek was named chairman of Walt Disney Parks and Resorts effective that day.

On April 29, 2015, the Walt Disney Company, through the subsidiary, Carousel Holdings Eat LLC, has purchased Carousel Inn & Suites hotel in Anaheim, from Good Hope International for $32 million. The purchase was considered a strategic purchase; the hotel would not be considered a part of the Disneyland hotel portfolio and would operate independently. Disney indicated in August 2016, that the company would be closing the Carousel Inn in October 2016 in preparation for razing it as part of plans to construct a new parking structure, transit plaza and pedestrian bridge over Harbor Boulevard.

On February 10, 2017, Disney revealed a deal to purchase Kingdom Holding Co.'s shares of Euro Disney S.C.A. as the first step in purchasing the remaining shares held by others. Disney has offered about $2.12 a share, a 67% premium over the Euronext Paris Stock Exchange value as of February 9. The company expects the buyout and delisting to be finished by June. Plans are for the company to invest another $1.4 billion into Disneyland Paris after the buyout to counteract the recent Paris terrorist attack, which hurt a previous 2014 park hotel investment. If this buyout is successful, it would make the resort the only resort 100% owned and operated by Disney outside of the United States of America. On June 13, 2017, the Walt Disney Company reached the 95% threshold required for a mandatory takeover according to French law, owning 97.08% of Euro Disney S.C.A., paving the way for the Walt Disney Company to become the sole owner and operator of Disneyland Paris.

=== Disney Parks, Experiences and Products (2018-2023) ===
Disney Parks, Experiences and Products logo

As part of the Walt Disney Company's March 2018 strategic reorganization, Disney Consumer Products, and Interactive Media was merged into the Walt Disney Parks and Resorts segment and renamed Walt Disney Parks, Experiences and Consumer Products. Parks and Resorts Chairman Bob Chapek was named chairman of this new segment, who also previously served as head of Disney Consumer Products. At the time, the Consumer Products chairman position was vacant, as its former holder, James Pitaro, had been recently appointed as the new head of ESPN and co-chair of Disney Media Networks.

In March 2018, a Disney Parks West regional division was formed with Disneyland Resort in California, Walt Disney World in Florida, and Disneyland Paris under Catherine Powell, outgoing Disneyland Paris president. This mirrors the Disney Parks East regional division consisting of Shanghai Disney Resort, Hong Kong Disneyland and Walt Disney Attractions Japan and headed by Michael Colglazier. Imagineering was expected to take on the development of merchandise, games, publishing, and apps. Paul Gainer moved up from Disney Retail head to head up the new Global Product Management and Distribution unit, which includes Disney Retail, Global Licensing, and digital guest experience.

New Vacation Operations and Disney Cruise Line division was renamed Disney Signature Experiences along with a new president, Jeff Vahle, for the division in April 2018. On January 1, 2019, Walt Disney Parks, Experiences and Consumer Products changed its name to Disney Parks, Experiences and Products. Disney Cruise Line purchased in early March 2019 another Bahamas destination, the Lighthouse Point property on the island of Eleuthera. In July 2019, Disney denied reports of plans to launch its own airline with the purchase of small regional airlines in the United States.

With the acquisition of 21st Century Fox by August 2019, National Geographic Partners' non-TV operations were transferred into its Disney counterpart with NG Media and National Geographic Expeditions moving to the segment's units, Disney Publishing Worldwide and Disney Signature Experiences, respectively.

Powell supervised the two Star Wars-themed land, Star Wars: Galaxy's Edge, openings in May at Disneyland and August 2019 in Disney's Hollywood Studios. However, initial numbers showed an attendance dropped instead of the boost such an opening should have generated. In late September, Powell left the company with the Parks West regional division being dissolved, thus having those resorts' executives directly report to chairman Chapek. He denied that Powell was let go because of the low attendance issue from Galaxy's Edge, but instead, Powell's position was a temporary one to allow Chapek to focus on the acquisition of 21st Century Fox.

Powell's departure from Disney was soon followed by a domino of executive appointments, as announced on September 26, 2019. George Kalogridis, then-president of the Walt Disney World Resort, was promoted as the president of segment development and enrichment. Kalogridis was replaced by Josh D'Amaro, then-president of the Disneyland Resort, as president of the Walt Disney World Resort. In turn, D'Amaro was replaced by Rebecca Campbell as president of the Disneyland Resort. Campbell transferred from the Walt Disney Direct-to-Consumer & International segment where she served as the president of Europe, the Middle East, and Africa. Both D'Amaro and Campbell assumed these roles in November 2019. In addition, Michael Colglazier is also promoted as the president and managing director of Disney Parks International and will oversee Disneyland Paris as well as those under the Parks East regional division. In February 2020, Chapek was promoted from chairman of this segment to chief executive officer of the Walt Disney Company under executive chairman Bob Iger.

With the closure of all Disney parks in 2020 during the coronavirus pandemic, Disney donated 150,000 rain ponchos usually sold at the parks to MedShare, to be distributed in hospitals.

In May 2020, CEO Chapek named new appointees under the Disney Parks, Experiences, and Products segment. Succeeding Chapek as chairman of this segment is Josh D'Amaro, then-president of the Walt Disney World Resort. Jeff Vahle, then-president of Disney Signature Experiences, replaced D'Amaro as president of the Walt Disney World Resort. Thomas Mazloum, senior vice president for transportation and resort operations at the Walt Disney World Resort, succeeded Vahle as president of Disney Signature Experiences. In addition, Kareem Daniel, former president of operations/product creation/publishing/games at Walt Disney Imagineering, was named president of consumer products, games and publishing. Ken Potrock replaced Rebecca Campbell as president of the Disneyland Resort; Campbell returned to the Director-to-Consumer & International segment as its chairman, replacing Kevin Mayer.

On July 15, 2020, it was announced that Jill Estorino, then-executive vice president, global marketing and sales, replaced Michael Colglazier as president and managing director of Disney Parks International, supervising Tokyo Disney Resort, Disneyland Paris, Hong Kong Disneyland, and Shanghai Disney Resort.

On September 28, 2020, D'Amaro announced the lay off of over 28,000 employees in the parks division, many of them being part-time workers. D'Amaro cited the uncertainty of the ongoing COVID-19 pandemic as well as California's continued reluctance to reopen Disneyland as factors. Nearly 6,700 Central Florida employees, including almost 6,500 Disney World workers, were also among those laid off. On October 13, 2020, Disney CEO Bob Chapek agreed to keep Disney World at only 25% capacity until the Center For Disease Control (CDC) issued new guidance and also stated that with regards to reopening Disneyland, "It's not much of a negotiation. It's pretty much a mandate that we stay closed." Disneyland Resort was allowed to reopen on April 30, 2021, after a 412-day closure.

Historically, Imagineering and certain other Disney units housed within the parks division were physically headquartered in the Los Angeles metropolitan area (near the Walt Disney Company's film and television divisions)—even as the rapid growth of Walt Disney World meant that by the start of the 21st century, most Disney U.S. domestic theme park jobs were based in Florida, not California. In July 2021, it was reported that approximately 2,000 positions would be transferred over the next couple of years to a new 60-acre corporate campus in the Lake Nona area of Orlando, Florida, and it was later reported that fall that as many as 90% of the transferred positions would be Imagineering positions. The relocation was reportedly motivated in part by $570 million in tax breaks from the state of Florida, as well as Florida's business-friendly climate, lower cost of living, and lack of a state income tax. The planned relocation was cancelled in May 2023 amidst a feud with Florida governor Ron DeSantis.

=== Disney Experiences (2023-present) ===
On November 16, 2023, the division was renamed Disney Experiences. The change came as Disney was increasing investment in its parks, resorts, and cruise business.

On August 10, 2024, Josh D'Amaro hosted a Disney Experiences Showcase at the Honda Center as part of D23: The Ultimate Disney Fan Event, formerly known as D23 Expo. During the presentation, Disney detailed plans to invest $60 billion in its Experiences businesses over the following decade, including new and expanded attractions at its theme parks. D'Amaro also announced that Disney Cruise Line would add four more ships in addition to four already under construction, bringing its planned fleet to 13 ships by 2031.

The event also came amid criticism over rising prices at Disney's theme parks. Critics argued that higher ticket, hotel, and other costs had made Disney vacations less affordable for many middle-class visitors. On August 16, D'Amaro responded by pointing to the range of ticket prices and options available, saying that Disney aimed to "provide as much access and flexibility as we possibly can, so as many of our fans can experience these things as possible".

On October 4, 2026, the majority of Disney Consumer Products was transferred from Disney Experiences to the Walt Disney Studios, including its global licensing and publishing operations. However, Disney Parks merchandise, Disney Store locations and DisneyStore.com remained under Disney Experiences.

== Leadership ==
- Thomas Mazloum, Chairman
  - Lisa Baldzicki, Executive Vice President, Global Experience & Innovation
  - Jill Estorino, President, Disneyland Resort
  - Tasia Filippatos, President & Managing Director, Disney Parks International
    - Andrew Bolstein, President and General Manager, Shanghai Disney Resort
    - Clark Jones, Senior Vice President and Managing Director, Walt Disney Attractions Japan
    - Christophe Murphy, President, Disneyland Paris
    - Tim Sypko, President and Managing Director, Hong Kong Disneyland Resort
  - Tami Garcia, Executive Vice President, People & Culture
  - Alannah Hall-Smith, Executive Vice President, Communications and Public Affairs
  - Scott Hudgins, Executive Vice President, Commercial & Marketing Strategy
  - Tommy Jones, Senior Vice President, Worldwide Safety, Health, Engineering & Sourcing
  - Douglas Leckie, Executive Vice President and Chief Technology Officer
  - Michael Moriarty, Executive Vice President and Chief Financial Officer
  - Matt Penarczyk, General Counsel
  - Ken Potrock, President, Major Events Integration
  - Natacha Rafalski, President, Disney Signature Experiences
    - Tracy Wilson, Senior Vice President and General Manager, Disney Cruise Line
    - Stephanie Young, President, Disney Vacation Club, Adventures & Expeditions, and Enrichment Programs
      - Bill Diercksen, Senior Vice President and General Manager, Disney Vacation Club
      - Nancy Schumacher, Senior Vice President and General Manager, Adventures & Expeditions
  - Joe Schott, President, Walt Disney World Resort
  - Bruce Vaughn, President and Chief Creative Officer, Walt Disney Imagineering

== Theme parks and resorts ==
=== Current theme parks ===
Locations of Disney resorts: Disney-owned, Disney joint ventures, Owned and licensed by The Oriental Land Company, In the planning phase; Owned and licensed by the Miral Group

==== Disneyland Resort ====
The Disneyland Resort was founded as a single park, Disneyland, and opened on July 17, 1955, in Anaheim, California. Disneyland Hotel opened to the public on October 5, 1955. In 2001, the site expanded significantly and was renamed the Disneyland Resort with the opening of a second theme park, Disney California Adventure, three hotels, and the Downtown Disney retail, dining, and entertainment complex. Disneyland was re-branded Disneyland Park to distinguish it from the larger 500-acre (2.0 km^{2}) resort complex.

==== Walt Disney World Resort ====
The Walt Disney World resort opened October 1, 1971, in Lake Buena Vista, Florida, with the Magic Kingdom theme park and three resort hotels. It expanded with the opening of the theme parks Epcot in 1982, Disney's Hollywood Studios in 1989 and Disney's Animal Kingdom in 1998, in addition to the water parks Disney's Typhoon Lagoon in 1989 and Disney's Blizzard Beach in 1995. In addition the resort includes the Disney Springs retail, dining, and entertainment complex. The resort occupies 27,258 acres (11,031 ha) overall, the largest (by area) and most-visited vacation resort in the world, with four theme parks, two water parks, 21 resort hotels, eight golf courses, the ESPN Wide World of Sports Complex and additional recreational activities.

==== Tokyo Disney Resort ====
Tokyo Disney Resort, in Urayasu, Chiba, Japan, opened April 15, 1983, as Tokyo Disneyland. On September 4, 2001, the resort expanded with second theme park Tokyo DisneySea. The resort includes six Disney hotels and several non-Disney hotels along with the Ikspiari retail, dining, and entertainment complex. Designed by Walt Disney Imagineering, the resort is fully owned and operated by The Oriental Land Company under license with the Walt Disney Company. Disney oversees all aspects of the resort and assigns Imagineers to it.

==== Disneyland Paris ====
Disneyland Paris opened on April 12, 1992 as Euro Disney Resort. Located in Marne-la-Vallée in the suburbs of Paris, France, it features two theme parks, Disneyland Park and Disney Adventure World, the Disney Village entertainment complex, and seven Disney resort hotels, over 4,940 acres (20.0 km^{2}). It is the only resort outside the United States fully owned and operated by the Walt Disney Company.

==== Hong Kong Disneyland Resort ====
Hong Kong Disneyland Resort opened September 12, 2005. The resort is located in Penny's Bay. The resort consists of Hong Kong Disneyland theme park, Inspiration Lake Recreation Centre, and three hotels, with land reserved for future expansion. It is owned and operated by Hong Kong International Theme Parks, a joint venture of the Walt Disney Company (48% ownership) and the Government of Hong Kong (52% ownership). The first phase of Hong Kong Disneyland Resort occupies 320 acres (1.3 km^{2}).

==== Shanghai Disney Resort ====
Shanghai Disney Resort opened on June 16, 2016. The resort is located in the city's Pudong district and has one theme park, two resort hotels, Shanghai Disneyland, and the Disneytown entertainment complex. It is owned and operated by Shanghai International Theme Park Company, a joint venture of the Walt Disney Company (43% ownership) and the Shanghai Shendi Group (57% ownership).

=== Future theme parks ===
==== Disneyland Abu Dhabi ====
In May 2025, Disney announced plans to develop a theme park and resort with Miral Group on Yas Island in Abu Dhabi, United Arab Emirates. Similar to the arrangement at Tokyo Disney Resort, the resort will be designed by Walt Disney Imagineering and owned and operated by Miral under license from The Walt Disney Company.

=== Cast member training ===
New employees at Disney theme parks, known as "cast members", receive training through Disney University, a company training program established by Walt Disney in 1955. Before beginning training specific to their individual roles, cast members participate in the "Disney Traditions" orientation program, which introduces them to the company's history, values, guest-service philosophy, and workplace culture.

=== Cancelled and unrealized projects ===
Over the decades, Disney has considered several theme park and resort projects that were later cancelled or never developed.

Disney planned to build Walt Disney's Riverfront Square in St. Louis, but cancelled the project in July 1965.

During the 1960s, Disney also developed plans for a ski resort at Mineral King in California. Opposition from environmental groups led by the Sierra Club resulted in a temporary court injunction in 1969 and years of legal disputes. The project's scope and design changed several times before Mineral King was incorporated into Sequoia National Park in 1978, effectively ending the possibility of developing the resort.

In the early 1990s, Disney proposed Disney's America, a history-themed park in Haymarket, Virginia. The project faced significant opposition from preservation groups and local residents. On September 28, 1994, Disney chairman Michael Eisner announced that the company was abandoning the project.

Between 2007 and 2008, Disney considered a smaller Disneyland-style resort in Sydney, Australia, provisionally known as "Disney Wharf at Sydney Harbour". The proposal was ultimately abandoned following a mixed response from the New South Wales Government.

==== Misreported projects ====
In January 2011, reports linked Disney to a proposed entertainment complex in Haifa, Israel, which was planned to include a 30,000-square-meter amusement park. The project was to be partially financed by Shamrock Holdings, a Disney-affiliated investment firm. After reports from the Israeli business newspaper Globes and industry publication Amusement Management suggested that Disney itself would participate in the development, a spokesperson for Walt Disney Parks and Resorts clarified that the company had no plans to be involved in building the park.

== Disney Signature Experiences ==
Disney Signature Experiences, formerly known as Disney Cruise Line & New Vacation Operations, encompasses several of Disney's newer non-theme park travel and vacation businesses. The division is headed by president Natacha Rafalski.

=== History ===
In February 2009, Tom McAlpin left the presidency of Disney Cruise Line and was succeeded by Karl Holz, who became president of both Disney Cruise Line and New Vacation Operations. New Vacation Operations included Adventures by Disney.

Disney Cruise Line ordered three ships of a new class, known during development as the Triton class, in 2016 and 2017. In April 2017, Disney announced that Holz would retire from the presidency of Disney Cruise Line on February 15, 2018, while Anthony Connelly would assume the role of president on October 1, 2017.

Following Disney's company-wide reorganization in March 2018 that created the Disney Parks, Experiences and Products segment, Disney Cruise Line and New Vacation Operations were renamed Disney Signature Experiences, with Jeff Vahle appointed president. In May 2018, Ken Potrock was promoted from senior vice president and general manager of Disney Vacation Club to president of Consumer Products.

In early March 2019, Disney Cruise Line purchased the Lighthouse Point property on the island of Eleuthera from the government of the Bahamas for development as an additional cruise destination.

=== Disney Cruise Line ===
Formed in 1995, Disney Cruise Line's fleet comprises eight ships: Disney Magic (1997), Disney Wonder (1999), Disney Dream (2011), Disney Fantasy (2012), Disney Wish (2022), Disney Treasure (2024), Disney Destiny (2025), and Disney Adventure (2026). Disney has two upcoming ships scheduled to launch; the Disney Believe, scheduled to launch in late 2027; and the Disney Imagination, scheduled to launch in 2029. Three further ships are planned through 2031, which would bring the total fleet to 13 ships.

Disney Cruise Line also operates two private destinations in the Bahamas: Castaway Cay and Lookout Cay at Lighthouse Point.

=== Disney Vacation Club ===
Disney Vacation Club is a timeshare program that includes 12 themed resorts at Walt Disney World Resort, three at Disneyland Resort, and three standalone locations: Disney's Aulani Resort, Disney's Hilton Head Island Resort, and Disney's Vero Beach Resort.

There are an estimated 220,000 club members.

=== Adventures by Disney ===
Launched in 2005, Adventures by Disney is a program of all-inclusive guided vacation packages offered primarily at non-Disney destinations around the world.

=== National Geographic Expeditions ===
National Geographic Expeditions is a travel program offering guided tours and excursions around the world. Its expedition programs include access to research scientists, field experts, and local guides who provide educational commentary.

Following Disney's acquisition of 21st Century Fox, National Geographic Partners' National Geographic Expeditions became part of Disney Signature Experiences by August 2019.

=== Golden Oak at Walt Disney World Resort ===
Golden Oak at Walt Disney World Resort is a residential neighborhood located within Walt Disney World Resort. It consists of 299 homes, the private Golden Oak Club, and the Four Seasons Resort Orlando resort hotel.

=== Storyliving by Disney ===
Storyliving by Disney consists of master-planned residential communities developed with involvement from Walt Disney Imagineering and staffed by Disney cast members. Cotino, in Rancho Mirage, California, is the first community under development, while Asteria, in Pittsboro, North Carolina, is the second. Additional locations are being explored.

== Disney Sports Enterprises ==
Disney Sports Enterprises
- Formerly: Disney Sports Attractions
- Industry: Sports
- Founder: Reggie Williams
- Key people: Rosalyn Durant (SVP, operations for Disney Springs, ESPN Wide World of Sports and Waterparks); Faron Kelley (vice president, sports)
- Services: Road races Sports events
- Parent: Disney Experiences
- Divisions: ESPN Wide World of Sports Complex runDisney
- Website: disneysportsnews.com

Disney Sports Enterprises, formerly known as Disney Sports Attractions, is the Disney Experiences unit responsible for Disney's sports-related operations. Its principal operations include the ESPN Wide World of Sports Complex and the runDisney program.

=== History ===
Disney's sports operations at Walt Disney World date to the resort's opening. The Palm and Magnolia golf courses were among its original golf facilities and began hosting the Walt Disney World Open Invitational, an annual PGA Tour event.

In 1994, Disney held the inaugural Walt Disney World Marathon, its first major road race, and subsequently expanded its running-event program. A Disneyland Marathon and 5K were held in 1995, three weeks after the Los Angeles Marathon, on March 26, 1995.

In 1995, Walt Disney World had IMS Events, Inc. construct the Walt Disney World Speedway. Disney's Wide World of Sports opened in 1997 under executive Reggie Williams.

By 1998, Williams had been named vice president of Disney Sports Attractions, overseeing a newly created sports and recreation division. The first Disney Classic 10K was held on October 3, 1999, helping launch Walt Disney World's 15-month Millennium Celebration. On March 30, 2003, Disney Sports Attractions held the first Disney Inline Marathon.

Williams retired as vice president of Disney Sports Attractions on November 21, 2007. On January 3, 2008, Ken Potrock was promoted to senior vice president of the renamed Disney Sports Enterprises.

On February 25, 2010, Disney's Wide World of Sports was renamed the ESPN Wide World of Sports Complex, accompanied by upgrades and new facilities.

On September 25, 2011, Disney began leasing five Walt Disney World golf courses—Palm, Magnolia, Lake Buena Vista, Osprey Ridge, and Oak Trail—to Arnold Palmer Golf Management under a 20-year operating agreement in which Disney and the operator would share revenue. As part of the agreement, Arnold Palmer Golf Management planned to redesign the Palm course.

The Orlando golf market had experienced an oversupply of courses following the area's building boom and subsequent downturn, making profitability difficult. Disney sought to use Palmer's involvement and the "Palmer Advantage" membership program to attract greater attention to its courses. Osprey Ridge had been sold to Four Seasons Hotels and Resorts for construction of a hotel, though the project was delayed until 2014; Arnold Palmer Golf Management was to continue operating the course until hotel construction began. Another course, Eagle Pines, had closed several years earlier to make way for the Golden Oak residential development, which was under construction in 2011.

In January 2013, Potrock was promoted to senior vice president and general manager of Disney Vacation Club and Adventures by Disney. Tom Wolber, then senior vice president of operations for Disney Cruise Line, was promoted to succeed him at Disney Sports Enterprises. The Walt Disney World Speedway closed in late June 2015.

Sports marketing director Faron Kelley was promoted to vice president of sports in January 2016, with responsibility also extending to Disney's water parks.

In early March 2018, Maribeth Bisienere, then senior vice president of Disney Springs and ESPN Wide World of Sports, was promoted to senior vice president of Parks. In February 2020, Rosalyn Durant moved from ESPN to Walt Disney World Resort as senior vice president of operations for Disney Springs, ESPN Wide World of Sports, and the water parks.

=== runDisney ===
runDisney is the road-race division of Disney Sports Enterprises. Its events are designed to encourage runners to plan a "runcation", combining participation in a race with a vacation at a Disney resort.

Race weekends are held at Walt Disney World Resort and Disneyland Resort, while additional virtual race events take place throughout the year. Runners who complete a race of 10 miles or longer at both resorts within a calendar year can complete the runDisney Coast to Coast Race Challenge.

runDisney races
| Location | Race weekend | Month | Inaugurated |
|---|---|---|---|
| Walt Disney World | Walt Disney World Marathon | January | 1994 |
| Walt Disney World | Disney Princess Half-Marathon | February | 2009 |
| Walt Disney World | runDisney Springtime Surprise Weekend | April | |
| Walt Disney World | Disney Wine & Dine Half-Marathon | November | |
| Disneyland | Disneyland Half-Marathon | January/February | |
| Disneyland | Disneyland Halloween Half-Marathon | September | |

== Disney IP at third-party theme parks ==
Following Disney's acquisitions of Marvel Entertainment in 2009, Lucasfilm in 2012, and 21st Century Fox in 2019, some Disney-owned intellectual properties continue to appear at theme parks operated by other companies under pre-existing licensing agreements.

=== Marvel ===
Marvel Super Hero Island, a themed land featuring characters and settings from Marvel Comics, has operated at Universal Orlando Resort's Universal Islands of Adventure since 1999. A version of The Amazing Adventures of Spider-Man also operated at Universal Studios Japan from 2004 to 2024.

Under a 1994 licensing agreement between Marvel and Universal Destinations & Experiences, Universal retains theme park rights to certain Marvel characters and character families within specified geographic areas. As a result, characters associated with properties represented at Universal Orlando—including the Avengers, Fantastic Four, X-Men, and Spider-Man families—are subject to restrictions on their use at Walt Disney World.

The agreement has nevertheless allowed Walt Disney World to use Marvel characters not covered by Universal's existing character families. These have included Star-Lord and Gamora from Guardians of the Galaxy and Doctor Strange.

Outside the areas covered by Universal's licensing rights, Disney has made broader use of Marvel properties at its theme parks. Hong Kong Disneyland, Shanghai Disneyland, and Disneyland Paris have incorporated Marvel characters and attractions, including attractions marketed under the Marvel name. Marvel properties also appear at independently operated parks; IMG Worlds of Adventure in Dubai, for example, includes a Marvel-themed land.

=== Star Wars ===
A Star Wars-themed section of Legoland California's Miniland USA opened in 2011, with a similar version opening at Legoland Florida in November 2012, only weeks after Disney announced its acquisition of Lucasfilm and the Star Wars franchise. The Star Wars-themed sections at Legoland California, Legoland Florida, and other Legoland locations closed before the 2020 theme park season following the expiration of their licensing agreement with Lucasfilm.

=== 20th Century Studios ===
Following Disney's acquisition of 21st Century Fox on March 20, 2019, The Simpsons became part of Disney's portfolio. Existing licensing arrangements, however, allowed the franchise to continue being represented at Universal theme parks through attractions and themed areas, including The Simpsons Ride at Universal Studios Florida and Universal Studios Hollywood, as well as the Springfield areas at both parks.

Disney's acquisition of Fox also affected the future of Malaysia's then-under-construction 20th Century Fox World theme park. The park's owner, Genting Group, filed a $1.75 billion lawsuit against the Walt Disney Company and 21st Century Fox in November 2018, accusing Fox of attempting to withdraw from the licensing agreement for the park. Genting alleged that Fox had taken steps to cancel the contract and named Disney as a defendant, contending that Disney executives were "calling the shots" as the acquisition of Fox approached completion. Genting further alleged that Disney opposed the project because it would not control the park and because the development was adjacent to a casino, which Genting argued conflicted with Disney's family-oriented image.

Fox described Genting's lawsuit as "without merit", stating that it had sought to withdraw from the agreement because Genting had repeatedly failed to meet agreed-upon deadlines over several years. Fox also rejected Genting's allegations concerning Disney's role in the dispute.

In July 2019, Fox and Genting settled their respective lawsuits. Under the settlement, Genting received a license to use certain Fox intellectual properties, while non-Fox intellectual properties would make up the remainder of the park's attractions. The outdoor park would no longer be called 20th Century Fox World and was instead renamed Genting SkyWorlds.

== Disney parks in media ==
Disney theme parks and attractions have been adapted into, or have served as inspiration for, films, books, comic books, television series, television specials, television pilots, and video games.

Disney's relationship between its parks and other media dates to the development of Disneyland. The company entered network television with the Disneyland television series, named after the park then under construction. The program was used in part to help finance and promote Disneyland, and episodes sometimes featured the park or individual attractions.

The Walt Disney Company later became a notable producer of films based directly on theme park attractions. Most early attraction-based films achieved limited commercial success, with the major exception of the Pirates of the Caribbean series. Walt Disney Pictures produced Pirates of the Caribbean sequels in 2006 and 2011 that each earned approximately $1 billion at the worldwide box office.

=== Film and television ===
Disney initially experimented with attraction-based films on a limited basis. Disney Telefilms produced Tower of Terror, the first Disney film based on a theme park attraction, for the Wonderful World of Disney anthology series in 1997. In 2000, Touchstone Pictures released Mission to Mars, based on the closed attraction of the same name.

Walt Disney Pictures adapted the Country Bear Jamboree into The Country Bears in 2002. In 2003, the studio released two attraction-based films, Pirates of the Caribbean: The Curse of the Black Pearl and The Haunted Mansion. Pirates of the Caribbean developed into the Pirates of the Caribbean film series and a broader franchise. Following four sequels, the film series had grossed more than $5.4 billion worldwide.

Following the success of the Pirates of the Caribbean franchise, Disney sought additional projects based on its parks and attractions throughout the 2010s.

By November 2010, Jon Favreau had been selected to develop a film based on the Magic Kingdom, envisioned as a project in the style of Night at the Museum, with Strike Entertainment attached to produce. An earlier screenplay by Ronald D. Moore had been rejected.

A further film based on The Haunted Mansion was in development with Guillermo del Toro as of August 2012. A film based on Mr. Toad's Wild Ride was also in development at Disney by January 2013.

Tomorrowland, the first Disney feature film to be loosely based on an entire theme park land rather than an individual attraction, was announced in January 2013 for an initially planned December 2014 release. Also in 2013, ABC ordered a television pilot based on Big Thunder Mountain Railroad.

It's a Small World also generated multiple media projects. An animated online series, It's a Small World: The Animated Series, was developed in 2013. In April 2014, Disney also announced development of a feature film based on the attraction, with Jon Turteltaub attached to direct.

In October 2015, another theatrical adaptation of Tower of Terror was being developed by screenwriter John August and producer Jim Whitaker, while the long-developing Jungle Cruise film had attached an actor.

Disney park operations have also served as subjects for television programming. In May 2017, Freeform aired the documentary special Disney's Fairy Tale Weddings, based on the services offered by Disney's Disney's Fairy Tale Weddings & Honeymoons operation. Following the success of the May special, Freeform ordered a seven-episode series in October 2017. A second special, Holiday Magic, aired on December 11, 2017, and the regular series, ultimately consisting of six episodes in its initial run, premiered on June 11, 2018.

=== Publishing and comics ===
Disney Publishing Worldwide has developed several book series based on Disney parks and attractions. The Kingdom Keepers series began with Disney After Dark in 2005. Author Ridley Pearson initially planned the series as five books, but it was expanded to seven following the success of the first installment. The first novel in a sequel trilogy was released on March 31, 2015.

Other Disney Publishing projects based on Disney Parks include Jason Lethcoe's Tales from Adventureland trilogy, published in 2017 and 2018 and centered on Adventureland attractions such as Walt Disney's Enchanted Tiki Room and Jungle Cruise. The Tales from the Haunted Mansion anthology series was written by John Esposito under the pen name Amicus Arcane, the fictional ghostly librarian of the Haunted Mansion. Julie Kagawa's Shinji Takahashi books explore the Society of Explorers and Adventurers, an organization represented at several Disney parks, in a modern-day setting.

Marvel Worldwide and Disney announced the Disney Kingdoms imprint in October 2013, with its first comic-book title scheduled for release in January 2014. Across six miniseries, Disney Kingdoms featured adaptations of the unbuilt Museum of the Weird; two series featuring Figment and Dreamfinder from Epcot's Journey into Imagination; and stories based on Big Thunder Mountain Railroad, The Haunted Mansion, and Walt Disney's Enchanted Tiki Room.

Disney Publishing Worldwide also revived its Disney Comics imprint. Its first publication was the Space Mountain graphic novel, released on May 7, 2014 and based on the theme park attraction of the same name.

=== Video games ===
A number of video games have been based on Disney parks or their attractions. Other games incorporate elements, locations, or concepts from the parks, including Epic Mickey and Starlight Valley.

== See also ==
- Anaheim Sports
