= Splash About International =

Baby swimwear brand

- Type: private Limited company
- Industry: Clothing industry
- Founded: 2001; 25 years ago
- Founders: Desri and Robin Goodwin
- Headquarters: Stallingborough, United Kingdom
- Products: Swim diaper, Buoyancy aid, Swimwear
- Website: www.splashabout.com

Splash About International, usually referred to as Splash About, is a British company that best known as a designer, manufacturer and retailer of swimwear and swimming aids for children and babies. The company also designs and makes maternity swimsuits.

== History ==
Splash About was founded by Desri and Robin Goodwin in 2001 with Desri's first creation, a wrap around baby wetsuit, the BabyWrap. This was followed later by her newborn wetsuit, the BabySnug and the Happy Nappy and then the float jacket and float suit which were designed by Robin.

The company is best known for developing the Happy Nappy system (in Britain, a nappy is a diaper), which comprises waterproof neoprene outer layers with leak-restricting grip and an inner absorbent layer. The idea is to allow babies to swim without contaminating the pool.

In 2011, Warrington-based private equity firm Energize Capital acquired a majority stake in the company.

== Work with the ASA and BSI ==
In 2014 Splash About announced that it was working alongside the Amateur Swimming Association and Water Babies to create a new British Standard for baby and Toddler Swimming.

In September 2015, the company was one of the sponsors of the BSI Group's Publicly Available Specification "Safeguarding 0 to 4 year old children within the teaching of swimming, including any associated professional photography. Code of practice" (PAS 520:2015), which aims "to tackle codifying best practice in how very young children should be taught to swim and professionally photographed during lessons."

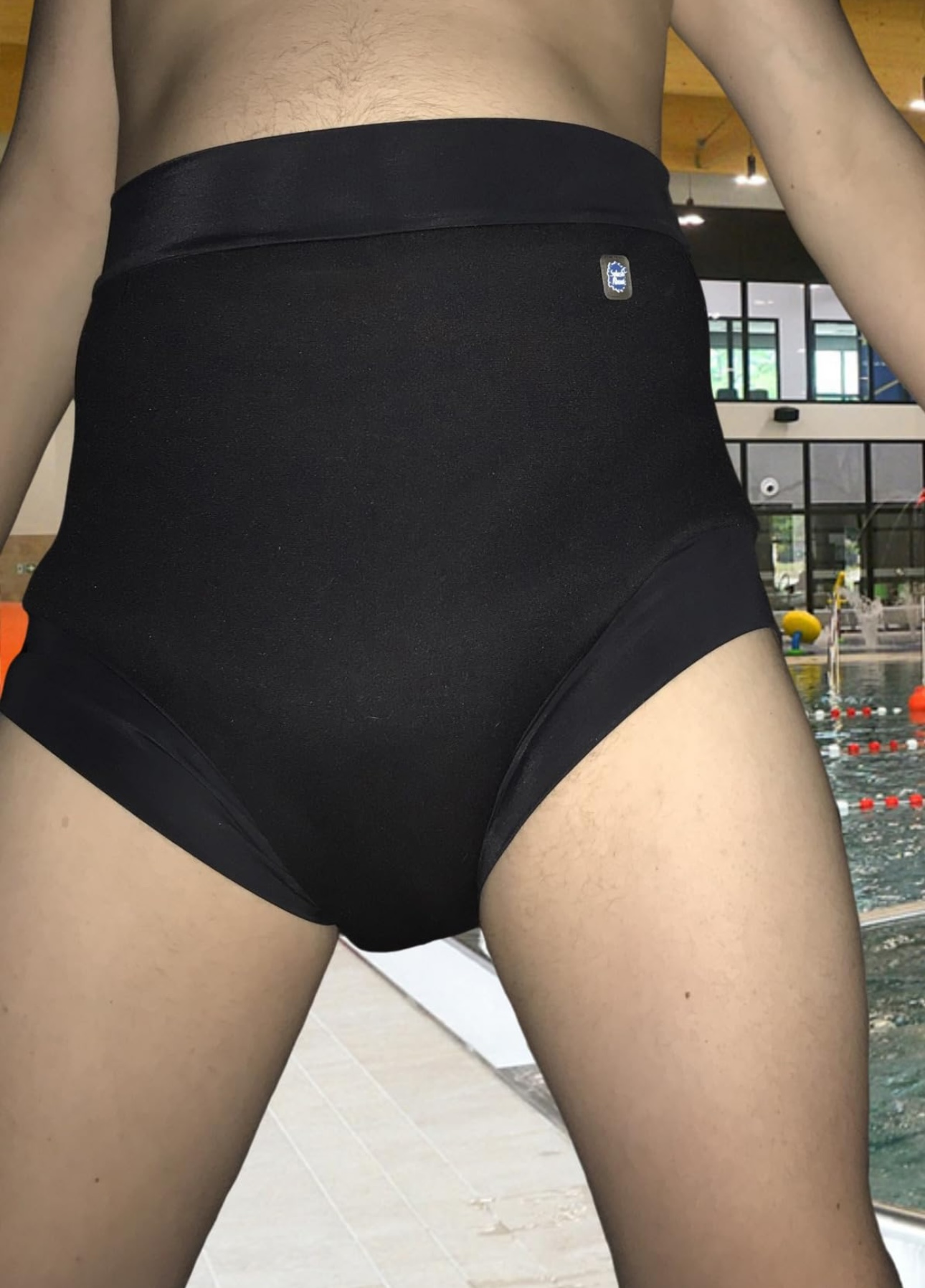

== Media ==
In 2015 US singer Beyoncé released a vacation video on Instagram in which her daughter Blue Ivy was wearing one of Splash About's float suits.
