= Rosemary Beach, Florida =

- Unincorporated community
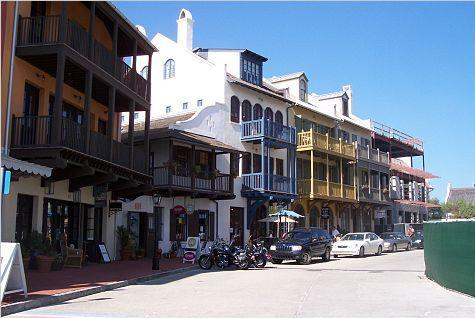
- Downtown Rosemary Beach

- Location within Florida
- Coordinates: 30.27968°N 86.014479°W
- Country: United States
- State: Florida
- County: Walton

Area
  - Total: 0.16 sq mi (0.42 km^{2})
- Elevation: 33 ft (10 m)
- Time zone: UTC-6 (Central (CST))
  - Summer (DST): UTC-5 (CDT)
- ZIP code: 32461
- Area code: 850
- GNIS feature ID: 1955359

Rosemary Beach is an unincorporated New Urbanism-influenced planned community in Walton County, Florida, United States on the Gulf Coast. The community is bisected by CR 30A which generally follows the coastline. Rosemary Beach is developed on land originally part of the older Inlet Beach neighborhood. The town was founded in 1995 by Patrick D. Bienvenue, President of Leucadia Financial Corporation, and was designed by Duany Plater-Zyberk & Company. The town is approximately 105 acres (0.164 mi^{2}; 0.42 km^{2}) and, upon completion, included more than 400 home sites and a mixed-use town center with shops, restaurants, and activities. It's elevaton is 33 ft (10 m) above sea level.

The design of the town reflects the French Quarter in New Orleans. Rosemary Beach was named after Rosemary Milligan, a realtor and entrepreneur, who inhabited the area since 1974 and owned much of the land that is now Rosemary Beach before selling the property to developers. The town is also rumored to be named after the fresh rosemary growing in the area.

== Design ==
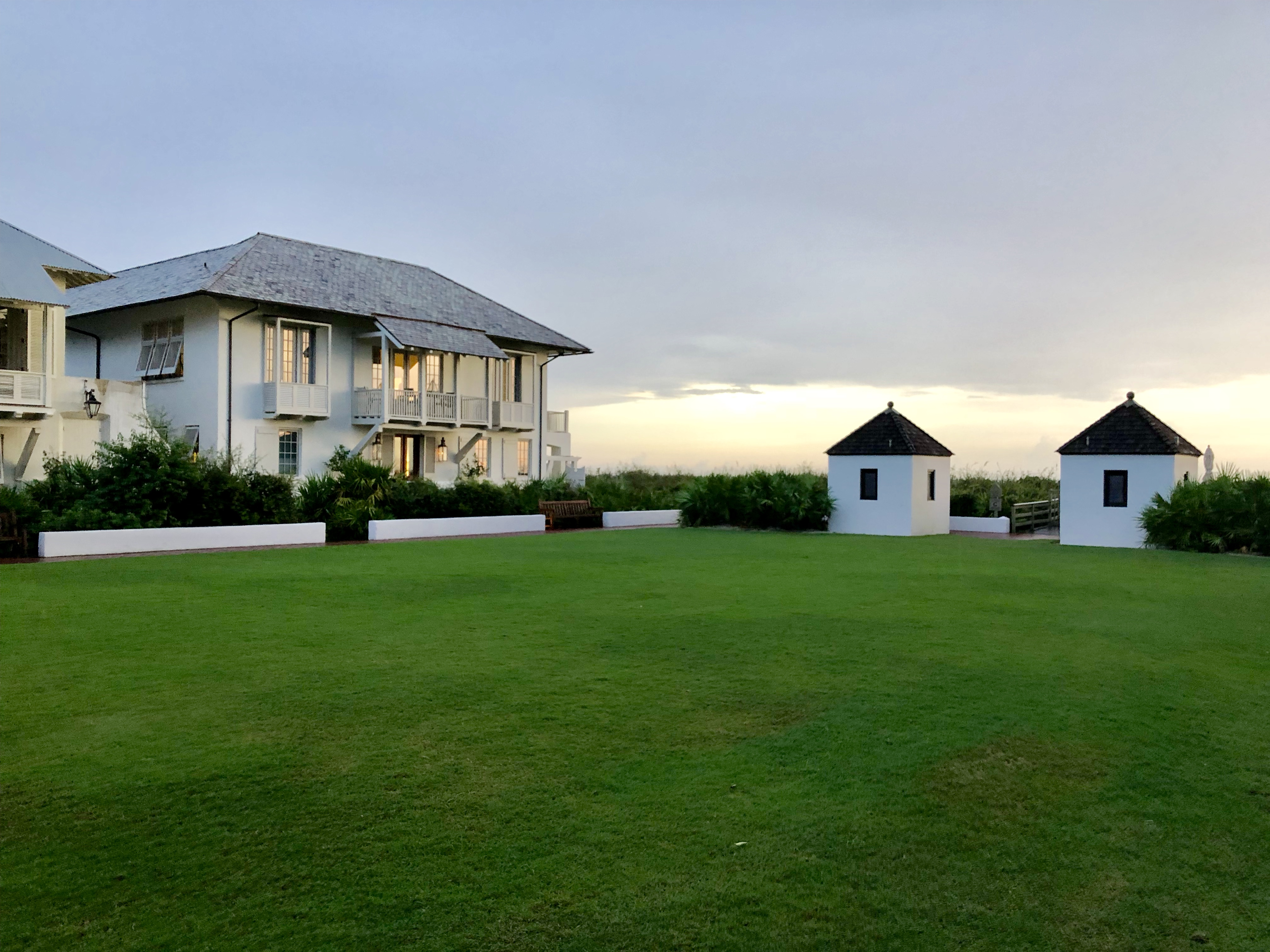
Eastern Green, Rosemary Beach

Rosemary Beach is one of three planned communities on Florida's Gulf coast designed by Andrés Duany and Elizabeth Plater-Zyberk. The other two are Seaside and Alys Beach. The three are examples of a style of urban planning known as New Urbanism.

Rosemary Beach, designed in 1995, offers shops, restaurants, a hotel, and public green spaces. The design of the town reflects New Orleans’ French Quarter and European Colonial influences in the West Indies and Caribbean. Sustainable materials, natural color palettes, high ceilings for better air circulation, balconies, and easy access to the beach by foot are typical design features.

The architecture of the homes in Rosemary resemble places like New Orleans, St. Augustine, Charleston S.C., and the West Indies. The houses along Rosemary Beach are close together and are all neutral colored. The community has four open door swimming pools.

== Beach ==
Rosemary Beach beaches are only accessible to people who are staying in Rosemary at the time. To gain beach access, residents are required to have a code or a wristband to allow them to go to the beach.

== Tourism ==
There are nature reserves located around the Rosemary area, like Eden Gardens State Park, Timpoochee Trail and Deer State Park, and Topsail Hill Preserve State Park. There are hiking trails and different wildlife located in these areas. Camping is also available at Topsail Hill Preserve State Park.

Tourism in Rosemary Beach has significantly spiked in the past few years. As tourists, the main form of transportation around the beach area is through biking. The temperature in Rosemary Beach during the summer ranges from a high of 90 °F (32 °C) to a low of 75 °F (24 °C). During the winter months, the temperature ranges from a high of 66 °F (19 °C) to a low of 45 °F (7 °C).

== See also ==
- Seaside, Florida
- Alys Beach, Florida
- New Urbanism
