= Storyliving by Disney =

Subsidiary of The Walt Disney Company

- Current owner: Disney Signature Experiences (Disney Experiences)
- Country: United States
- Introduced: 2022; 4 years ago
- Markets: United States
- Registered as a trademark in: United States
- Website: storylivingbydisney.com

Storyliving by Disney is a business venture and brand of The Walt Disney Company announced on February 16, 2022, to collaboratively develop master-planned communities that utilize Disney Imagineering and are staffed by Disney employees. It operates under the company's Disney Living Development, Inc. subsidiary. Cotino, in Rancho Mirage, California, was the first Storyliving by Disney community chosen for development, where ground breaking took place in April 2022. In December 2023, plans were announced for a second such community, named Asteria, in Pittsboro, North Carolina.

== Cotino ==
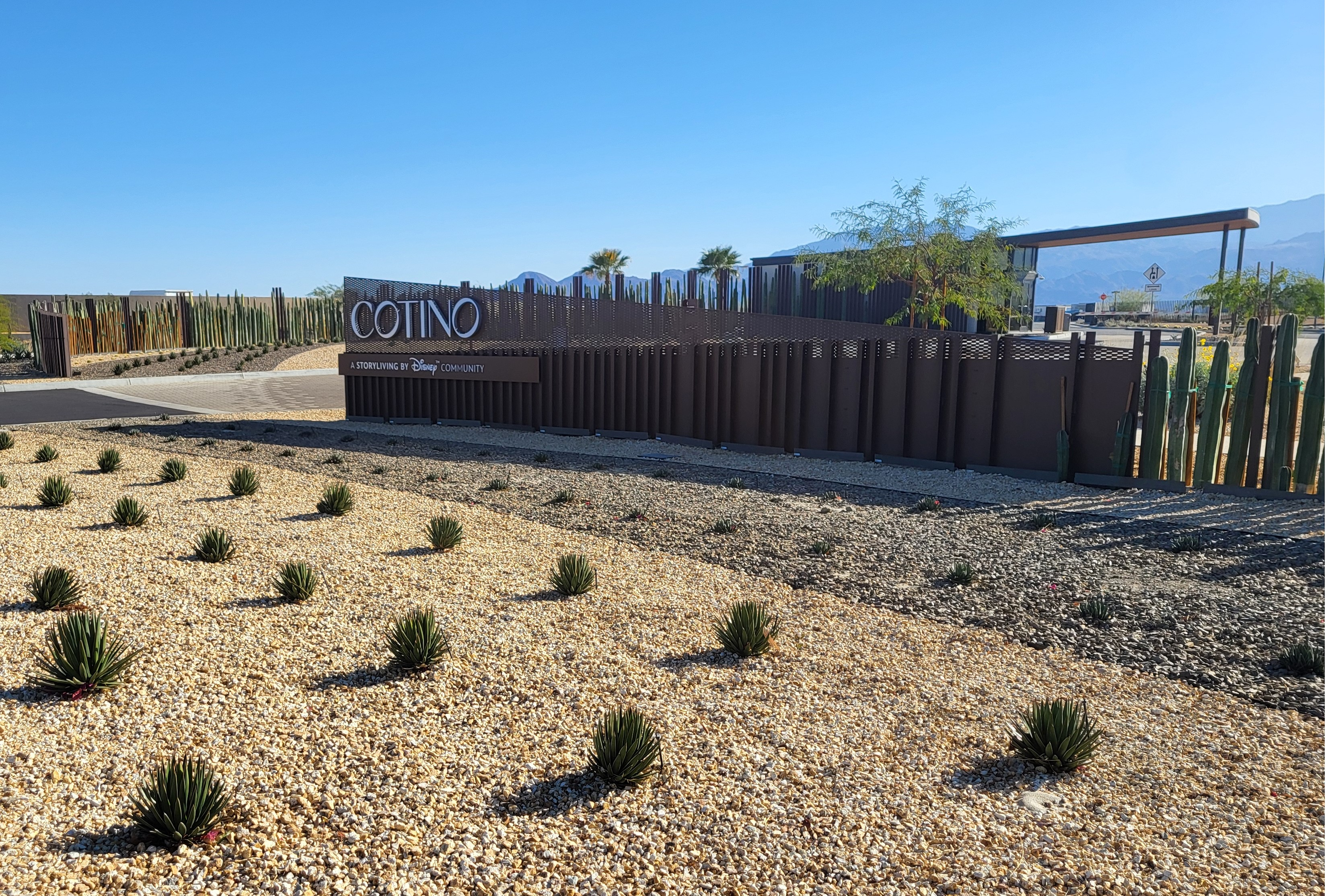
North entrance, on Gerald Ford Drive, to Storyliving by Disney's Cotino community in Rancho Mirage, California

Cotino, in Southern California's Coachella Valley, in the city of Rancho Mirage, is the first Storyliving by Disney community. It is adjacent to, and on land once owned by, the Annenberg Sunnylands Estate. Developed in collaboration with DMB Development LLC of Scottsdale, Arizona, Cotino is a 618-acre (250 ha) mixed-use development with several residential options, hotels, resort facilities, and a retail center, all surrounding a 24-acre (9.7 ha) grand oasis and lagoon.

The community's name, Cotino, was derived from Cotinus, the genus name of a plant commonly referred to as the Smoketree. It was chosen in recognition of Walt Disney, who maintained a home in the Smoke Tree Ranch in nearby Palm Springs. (Note: The smoke tree plant species commonly found in the Palms Springs area, and the Mojave Desert in general, is not of the genus Cotinus, but the genus and species Psorothamnus spinosus.)

Groundbreaking for the project was held on April 23, 2022. The first 70-acre (28 ha) tract map was tentatively approved by the Rancho Mirage Planning Commission on July 14, 2022, despite opposition by some Coachella Valley residents who cited the ongoing megadrought as a reason to revisit the environmental impact of the project before allowing the developer to proceed. Home sales began by December 2023, proceeded by the release of the styles and designs of the houses. In February 2024, as part of a quarterly earnings report, Disney announced that Cotino would open in 2025. The first homes were completed and put on the market by February 2025, while the rest of the development opened by Fall 2025.

Imagineering later revealed that Cotino would include a club house based on the design of the Parr house from the Disney-Pixar film Incredibles 2 (2018).

=== Section 31 ===
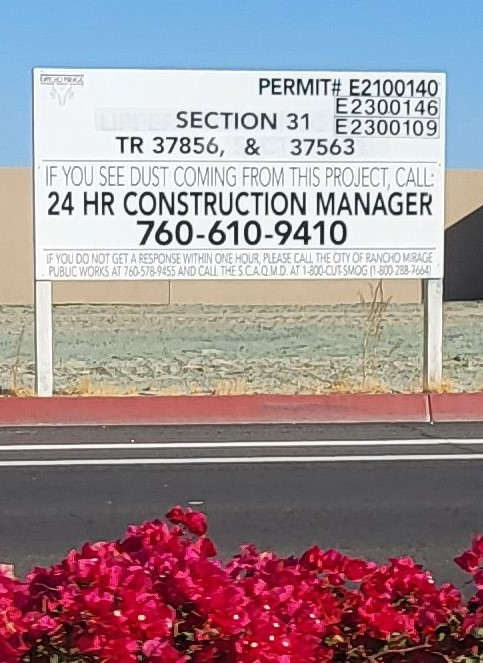
Building permit notice for Storyliving by Disney's Cotino in Rancho Mirage, California, on January 19, 2025.

The Cotino development includes most of US land survey Section 31 in the city of Rancho Mirage. Investors had previously purchased the land from the Annenberg estate in 1977, and in 1993 The Eagle Specific Plan had been approved for development, but never started. After some ownership changes, and at least two bankruptcies brought on by the Great Recession, Section 31 did not become available again until 2016. In 2017, a 23-acre (9.3 ha) portion of the land, separated from the rest of Section 31 by Monterey Avenue, was sold to the Tower Energy Group. The remainder of Section 31 was purchased in 2018 for $75 million by EC Rancho Mirage Holdings Limited Partnership, a Canadian firm organized in the state of Delaware. EC Rancho Mirage brought in DMB Development LLC to help design a new plan for the site, initially called the Section 31 Specific Plan or Section 31 Project. When Disney was brought in to apply their expertise and brand, the Section 31 Project became Cotino.

== Asteria ==
Asteria, in Pittsboro, North Carolina, near the cities of Raleigh, Durham and Chapel Hill, is the second Storyliving by Disney community under development. Sales for homes in the community are expected to begin by 2027. By October 2024, construction has yet to begin, due to environmental issues. By June 2025, the environmental issues were resolved, prior to Asteria's first phase of construction being approved by the Pittsboro Board of Commissioners. In October 2026, Storyliving by Disney donated $30,000 to various Pittsboro children's clubs in anticipation for the upcoming Asteria neighborhood development.

The first homes are set to be completed and put on the market by 2027, while the rest of the development will open by Fall 2028.

According to Shawn Montague, Disney Imagineering's Site Portfolio Executive, the community's name was chosen in recognition of the aster flowers native to North Carolina. Given the flower's namesake was the Greek goddess Astria, "... whose tears of stardust fell to Earth and sprouted the first aster flowers. We thought it was a beautiful way to honor North Carolina's natural beauty from the Earth to the sky."

== See also ==
- Celebration, Florida
- Golden Oak at Walt Disney World Resort
- Coachella Valley
- EPCOT (concept)
