= Swim diaper =

Diaper that is made for those who have fecal incontinence

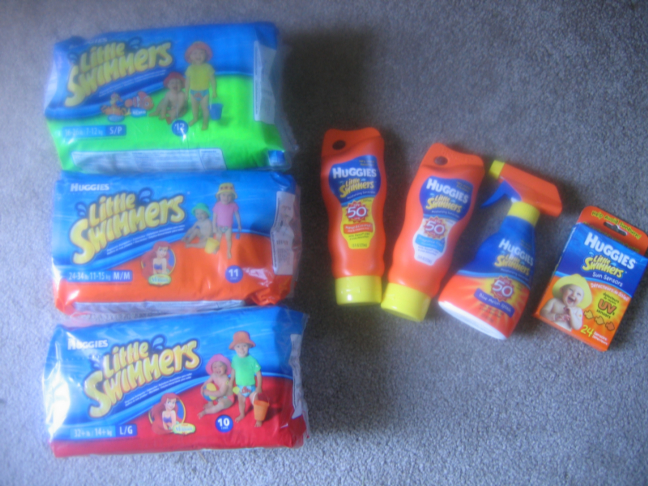
Packages of swim diapers (left).

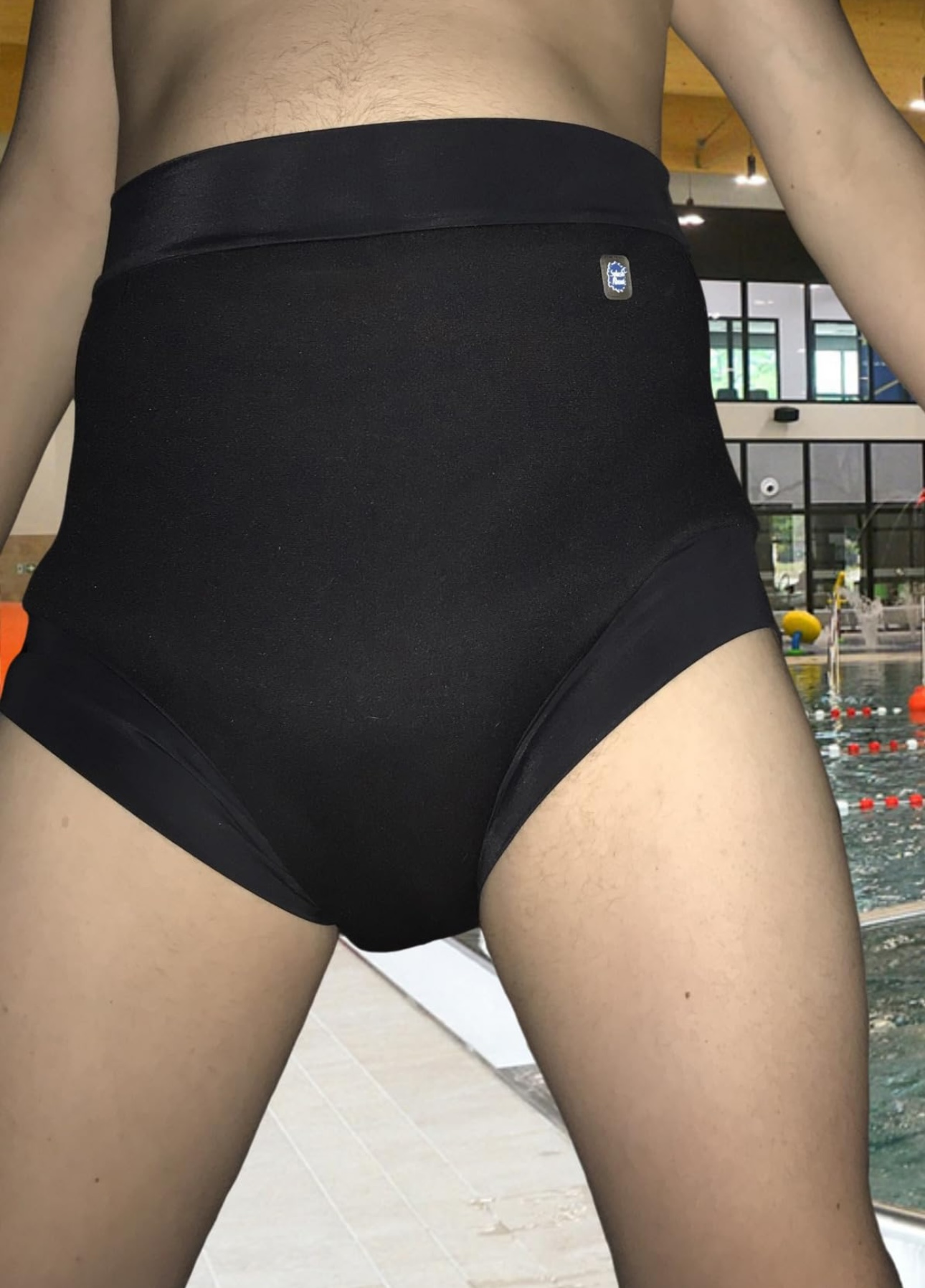
Adult swim diaper

A swim diaper or swim nappy is a diaper that is made for those who have fecal incontinence (usually babies or toddlers), which is worn underneath a bathing suit, or as a bathing suit. Swim diapers can be reusable and disposable. They are not intended to be absorbent, but only to contain solid waste (feces); the lack of absorbency prevents the swim diaper from swelling with water.

== Types ==
Often reusable swim diapers are lined with a fiber which encourages the solid waste to cling to the fiber without an absorbency layer. A snug fit in the legs and waist are key to function. Brands such as Splash About and The Honest Co. use tightly knit polyester or neoprene as their material. One disadvantage of a reusable swim diaper is that they must be washed to be reused. On the other hand, a disposable swim diaper is only partially biodegradable and repeated purchases may cost more than reuse. A popular brand of disposable swim diapers is Little Swimmers, marketed under the Kimberly-Clark Huggies brand. Procter & Gamble produces the rival brand Pampers Splashers. Both are sold in three sizes: small (16–26 lb or 7–12 kg), medium (24–34 lb or 11–15 kg) and large (over 32 lb or 14 kg+). Due to their design for swimwear, they are not as absorbent and not intended for regular diapering. Splash About offer the 'Happy Nappy' reusable neoprene swim nappy which can be washed and reworn.

== Swim diapers at public pools ==
Some public pools require swim diapers for use by young children and the incontinent out of hygiene concerns. For the same reason, other pools do not allow swim diapers at all. Sick people who are incontinent, including babies and children, who do not wear swim diapers may transmit E. coli from their fecal matter.

When not used properly, or when using inferior products, health experts caution that swim diapers may not protect pool water against communicable diseases, such as norovirus.
