= Adventures by Disney =

Walt Disney Parks and Resort

Adventures by Disney Travel Services, Inc.
- Trade name: Adventures by Disney
- Type: Subsidiary
- Industry: Hospitality, Tourism
- Founded: May 5, 2005; 21 years ago
- Headquarters: Celebration, Florida, U.S.
- Key people: Natacha Rafalski (president, Disney Signature Experiences)
- Services: Guided tours River cruises
- Parent: Disney Signature Experiences
- Website: Official website

Adventures by Disney Travel Services, Inc. (ABD) provides group guided family vacations to various domestic and international destinations. The company is a subsidiary of Disney Experiences's Signature Experiences division. Disney Experiences is a subsidiary of the Walt Disney Company.

Adventures by Disney provides 37 planned trips on six continents. On an Adventures by Disney vacation, guests are taken on expeditions that often feature activities designed for families and kids (or 'Junior Adventurers'). Two Disney-trained adventure guides (cast members) look after a group.

== History ==
Adventures by Disney first started operating in 2005 and featured just two US destinations. Adventures by Disney Travel Services, Inc. was incorporated on December 19, 2005.

By 2015, Adventures by Disney expanded its destinations to span six continents. Also in 2015, Adventures by Disney introduced several shorter four- and five-day "Long Weekend" itineraries in New York City, Nashville, San Francisco and Wyoming.

On April 13, 2015, Walt Disney Parks and Resorts announced that Adventures by Disney will have river cruise vacations. AmaWaterways will host the river cruises, while Adventures by Disney will guide and storytell with the group. Danube River cruises were expected to start in 2016. AmaWaterways and the company added a Rhine River cruise in 2017 on the new AMAKristina ship with six trips. In 2016, Disney added a seven-day Central Florida tour that includes three days at Walt Disney World with some backstage access, a day at Kennedy Space Center, a night at Disney Springs and additional days with kayak, boating and a BBQ.

Soon after a March 2018 conglomerate wide reorganization that formed Disney Parks, Experiences and Products segment division, Disney Cruise Line and New Vacation Operations was renamed Disney Signature Experiences along with the appointment of a new president, Jeff Vahle. With the acquisition of 21st Century Fox by Disney by August 2019, National Geographic Partner's travel and tour operations were transferred to Adventures by Disney while ending Traveler magazine's US edition.
