= Golden Oak at Walt Disney World Resort =

Residential community in Florida

Coordinates: 28.401529°N 81.544797°W

- Residential community
- Interactive map of Golden Oak at Walt Disney World Resort
- Country: United States
- State: Florida
- County: Orange
- City: Lake Buena Vista
- Website: disneygoldenoak.com

Golden Oak at Walt Disney World Resort is a residential community within the Walt Disney World Resort in Lake Buena Vista, Florida. It was designed by Walt Disney Imagineering and is owned and operated by Disney subsidiary Golden Oak Realty, within Disney Signature Experiences. The first phase of development is located southeast of the Magic Kingdom Park in Bay Lake. The area was named in homage to Walt Disney's Golden Oak Ranch in California. The first few home sites were available for purchase in late 2010 and were completed in late 2011. A Four Seasons resort was opened north of the property with the company purchasing several properties to serve in its "private residences" initiative on the WDW property.

The Wall Street Journal covered the neighborhood in early 2023, stating that "the approximately 300 homes in Golden Oak range from the low millions to nearly $20 million, and many are overflowing with Disney collectibles and elaborately themed rooms." Many residents choose Disney film themes for their interior designs.

== Overview ==
The Golden Oak community was announced on June 23, 2010, through the official Disney Parks Blog. The community includes multiple lakes, a small river, and a clubhouse designed in the style of an Italian villa. The clubhouse offers a game room, a restaurant and a pool for residents' use. It also hosts many of the community's social gatherings.

The locations of some homes within the community allow residents to see and hear the nightly fireworks from the nearby Magic Kingdom theme park.

== Neighborhoods ==
Golden Oak has several neighborhoods dedicated to different eras of architecture.

=== Kimball Trace ===
Kimball Trace's theme is based on Tuscan architecture; with houses ranging in size between 3,000 sq ft (280 m^{2}) and 5,000 sq ft (460 m^{2}). The neighborhood is named after animator and member of Disney's Nine Old Men, Ward Kimball.

=== Silverbrook ===
Silverbrook's name was inspired by the first large animation studio owned by Walt and Roy Disney. "Walt Disney Studios" (later renamed "Hyperion Studio") was located on 2719 Hyperion Avenue of Silver Lake, Los Angeles. Houses in Silverbrook range from 5,000 sq ft (460 m^{2}) to 7,000 sq ft (650 m^{2}).

=== Carolwood ===
Carolwood is located at the northernmost part of the development. The largest houses are located here. It's been part of an old golf course.

The name Carolwood is taken from Walt Disney's private railroad, which was built before Disneyland and its perimeter railroad opened in 1955.

=== Marceline ===
Marceline includes two parks, as well as houses ranging between 3,800 sq ft (350 m^{2}) and 6,000 sq ft (560 m^{2}). The neighborhood is named after Walt Disney's hometown of Marceline, Missouri.

=== Kingswell ===
Named after the street in Los Angeles where Walt and Roy Disney started their animation studio in 1923, this neighborhood has houses that range from approximately 5,000 sq ft (460 m^{2}) to 7,000 sq ft (650 m^{2}). The initial home sites have 0.5-acre (0.20 ha) lots.

=== Symphony Grove ===
The name of this neighborhood is a homage to Silly Symphonies, Walt Disney's animated short-film classics. Homesites are approximately 0.25-acre (0.10 ha) in size, with homes anticipated to range in size between 3,600 sq ft (330 m^{2}) and 4,900 sq ft (460 m^{2}).

== Notable residents ==
- H. Lee Scott, former CEO of Walmart
- Brook Lopez, NBA player - currently of the Los Angeles Clippers

== See also ==
- Baldwin Park, Florida – A similar mixed-use master-planned community that incorporates new urbanism, located in the city of Orlando, Orange County, Florida
- Celebration, Florida – A concept resort living community near the Walt Disney World resort also developed by The Walt Disney Company
- New urbanism – Urban design movement promoting sustainable land use
- Seaside, Florida – A concept new urbanism resort living community in Walton County, Florida
- Storyliving by Disney – Subsidiary of The Walt Disney Company
- Val d'Europe – Located near Disneyland Paris
