= Disney Destiny =

Cruise ship operated by Disney Cruise Line

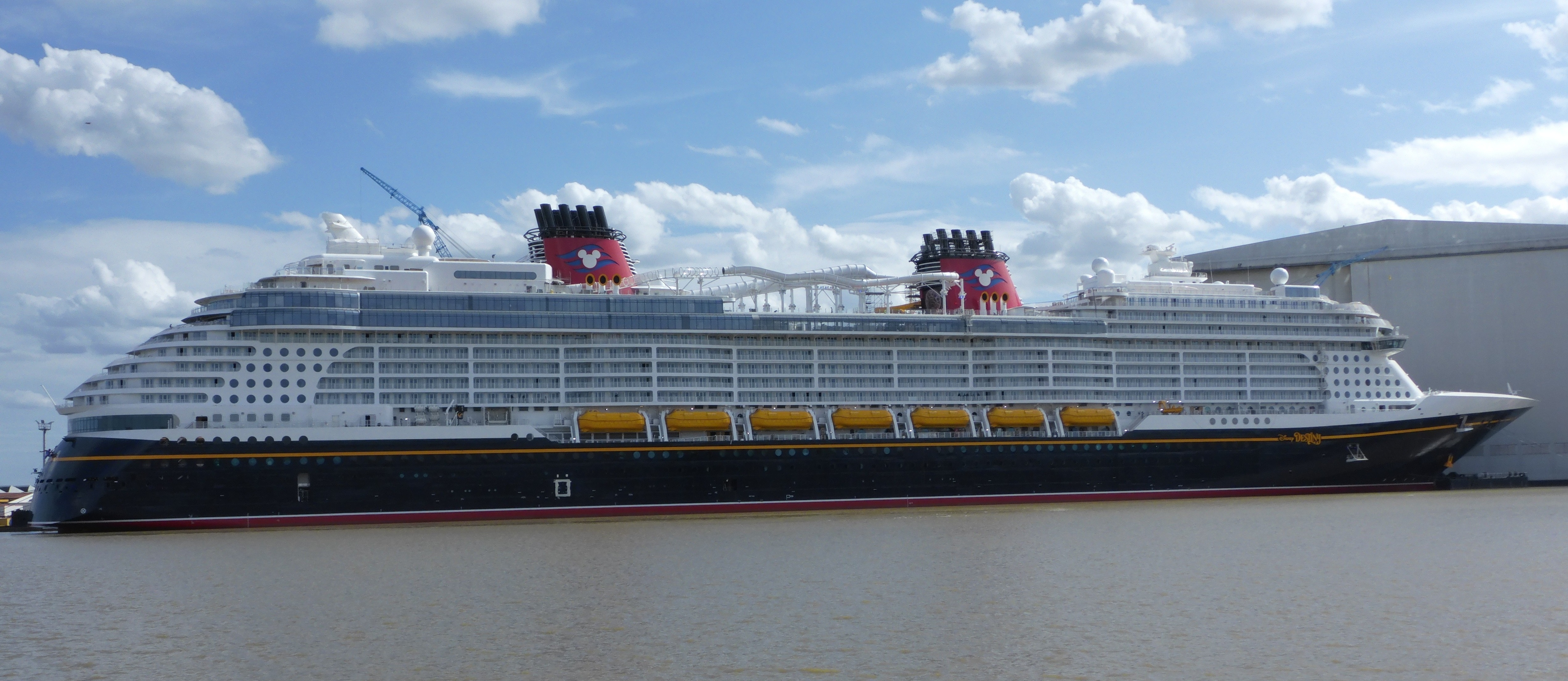
- Disney Destiny in 2025

History

Bahamas
- Name: Disney Destiny
- Owner: The Walt Disney Company
- Operator: Disney Cruise Line
- Port of registry: Nassau, Bahamas
- Ordered: July 15, 2017
- Builder: Meyer Werft (Papenburg, Germany)
- Cost: US$1.1 billion
- Yard number: S. 706
- Launched: August 9, 2025
- Sponsored by: Susan Egan
- Christened: November 10, 2025
- Completed: October 15, 2025
- Maiden voyage: November 20, 2025
- In service: 2025–present
- Identification: IMO number: 9834741; MMSI number: 311001540; Call sign: C6HQ9
- Status: In service

General characteristics
- Class & type: Wish-class cruise ship
- Tonnage: 144,000 GT
- Length: 341.8 m (1,121.4 ft)
- Beam: 39 m (128.0 ft)
- Height: 67 m (219.8 ft)
- Draft: 8.6 m (28.2 ft)
- Decks: 15
- Installed power: 5 × 12-cylinder MAN 51/60DF LNG engines
- Propulsion: 2 × 19.5 MW (26,100 hp) ABB Azipod azimuth thrusters; 4 × Wärtsilä bow thrusters
- Speed: Service: 19.5 kn (36.1 km/h; 22.4 mph); Maximum: 23 kn (43 km/h; 26 mph)
- Capacity: 2,508 passengers (double occupancy); 4,116 passengers (maximum)
- Crew: 1,606
- Notes: Bow character: Hero Minnie; Atrium characters: Black Panther and T'Challa; Stern characters: Spider-Man and Spiderbots

Disney Destiny is a cruise ship owned and operated by Disney Cruise Line, a subsidiary of the Walt Disney Company. She is the seventh ship in the Disney Cruise Line fleet and the third vessel of the Wish class, following Disney Wish (2022) and Disney Treasure (2024).

Disney Destiny was ordered on July 15, 2017, a little over a year after the first two Wish class vessels and was built by Meyer Werft at its shipyard in Papenburg, Germany. Construction of the vessel began with the keel laying on March 30, 2023, and the ship was launched on August 3, 2025. She was completed on October 24, 2025, christened on November 19, 2025, in New York City, and entered service with her maiden voyage on November 20, 2025.

As a member of the Wish class, Disney Destiny is slightly larger than the preceding Dream class, with a gross tonnage of approximately 144,000, compared with about 130,000 for Dream-class ships, while retaining the same number of guest cabins. During development, the class was known internally as the Triton class. The class marked several firsts for Disney Cruise Line, including the adoption of liquefied natural gas (LNG) as a lower-emission fuel and the use of azimuthing podded propulsion (Azipod).

== History ==
In March 2016, Disney Cruise Line announced that it had ordered two new ships, described as larger than Disney Dream and Disney Fantasy but with an equivalent number of staterooms. A third ship of the class was announced on July 15, 2017, at the D23 Expo. In March 2018, Disney Cruise Line released the first rendering of its new generation of cruise ships. The 140,000-ton cruise liners would be LNG-powered and would accommodate at least 2,500 guests. In January 2019, the class of ship was confirmed as Triton in public documents published by Port Canaveral, however, is now following the standard naming of class after the first ship. The ships, Disney Wish and Disney Treasure, were launched in June 2022 and December 2024, respectively.

On March 20, 2024, the ship was officially announced as the Disney Destiny and set sail in 2025. In May 2024, during the Q2 reports, the ship will instead sail in 2026. However, in July 2024, it was announced that the ship had been pushed up to November 20, 2025.

On July 31, 2024, Disney revealed that the ship would prominently feature characters from the Marvel Cinematic Universe. This includes the Worlds of Marvel restaurant, with a dinner show starring the Guardians of the Galaxy, and a lounge inspired by the Sanctum Sanctorum, home of Doctor Strange. Additionally, the lobby features a Black Panther statue and is themed to the nation of Wakanda, Spider-Man appears on the ship's stern, and the "Destiny Tower suite" is inspired by Iron Man.

The ship was floated in the drydock in March 2025 for the first time and was floated out on August 9, 2025. On September 19, 2025, the ship left the Papenburg shipyard for sea trials.

On November 2, 2025, the ship arrived at Port Canaveral, Florida.

On November 10, 2025, Port Everglades hosted the official christening ceremony of the Disney Destiny. At the ceremony, with all the ships of the Disney Cruise Line fleet, many Disney characters were in attendance for the celebration, including Mickey, Minnie, and the Disney Princesses, along with supporting Cast Members. The godmother of the Disney Destiny was announced to be American actress and singer Susan Egan, known for her roles as Megara in Disney Animation's 1997 film Hercules and as Belle in Disney's Beauty and the Beast musical on Broadway. The ship officially held her maiden voyage on November 20, 2025, sailing on a 4-night Bahamas cruise from Port Everglades with stops at Castaway Cay and Lookout Cay at Lighthouse Point.

== Horns ==
Disney Destiny features the signature Triton-class musical horns. In addition to all horns found on the Disney Wish and some of the horns from the Disney Treasure, the Disney Destiny's “Mickey” horns play the following tunes:

- "Go the Distance" from Hercules
- "Hakuna Matata" from The Lion King
- "Cruella De Vil" from 101 Dalmatians

== Recreation ==
=== On-board activities ===
Much like its sister ships, the Disney Destiny features a water coaster at sea, called the AquaMouse. The version on the Disney Destiny, which includes a brand-new short called Sing A Silly Song, features Mickey and Minnie encountering various classic Disney villains, including the Headless Horseman, the Evil Queen, Scar, and Chernabog.

=== Entertainment ===
Disney Destiny includes three theatres:

- Walt Disney Theatre (1,274 seats; live original productions: Disney Hercules, Frozen, A Musical Spectacular and Disney Seas the Adventure)
- Wonderland Cinema (84 capacity; screens motion pictures)
- Never Land Cinema (86 capacity; screens motion pictures)

=== Rotational dining ===
Every night of a Disney Destiny cruise, guests dine at a different restaurant. This is called "rotational dining". Guests rotate along with their servers which helps develop the relationship between the diner and wait staff.

The rotational dining restaurants on Disney Destiny are 1923, located on deck 3 midship; Worlds of Marvel, located on deck 4 aft; and Pride Lands: Feast of The Lion King, located on deck 5 aft. As well as rotational dining, the Disney Destiny also has two specialty restaurants: Palo Steakhouse and Enchanté, which incur an additional cost and are exclusively for adults. These restaurants are located on deck 12 towards the rear of the ship.
