= Disney Wish =

Cruise ship operated by Disney Cruise Line

- Disney Wish in September 2026

History

Bahamas
- Name: Disney Wish
- Owner: The Walt Disney Company
- Operator: Disney Cruise Line
- Port of registry: Nassau, Bahamas
- Ordered: March 3, 2016
- Builder: Meyer Werft (Papenburg, Germany)
- Cost: US$1.1 billion (equivalent to $1.2 billion in 2025)
- Yard number: S. 705
- Laid down: April 8, 2021
- Launched: February 11, 2022
- Sponsored by: Make-A-Wish children
- Christened: June 29, 2022
- Completed: February 6, 2022
- Acquired: June 9, 2022
- Maiden voyage: July 14, 2022
- In service: 2022–present
- Identification: IMO number: 9834739; MMSI number: 311001098; Call sign: C6FG4
- Status: In service

General characteristics
- Class & type: Wish-class cruise ship
- Tonnage: 144,000 GT
- Length: 341.8 m (1,121.4 ft)
- Beam: 39 m (128.0 ft)
- Height: 67 m (219.8 ft)
- Draft: 8.6 m (28.2 ft)
- Decks: 15
- Installed power: 5 × 12-cylinder MAN 51/60DF LNG engines
- Propulsion: 2 × 19.5 MW (26,100 hp) ABB Azipod azimuth thrusters; 4 × Wärtsilä bow thrusters
- Speed: Service: 19.5 kn (36.1 km/h; 22.4 mph); Maximum: 23 kn (43 km/h; 26 mph)
- Capacity: 2,508 passengers (double occupancy); 4,000 passengers (maximum)
- Crew: 1,555
- Notes: Bow character: Captain Minnie; Atrium characters: Cinderella, Lucifer, Jaq and Gus; Stern characters: Rapunzel and Pascal

Disney Wish is a cruise ship owned and operated by Disney Cruise Line, a subsidiary of the Walt Disney Company. She is the fifth ship in the Disney Cruise Line fleet and the lead vessel of the Wish class. The ship was followed by sister ships Disney Treasure (2024) and Disney Destiny (2025), with two additional ships in the class scheduled to enter service in 2027 (Disney Believe, announced March 18, 2026) and 2029 (Disney Imagination, announced October 13, 2026).

The Wish class was ordered on March 3, 2016, and built by Meyer Werft at its shipyard in Papenburg, Germany. Construction began with the keel laying on April 8, 2021, and the ship was launched on February 11, 2022. She was completed on February 6, 2022, acquired by Disney Cruise Line on June 9, 2022, and christened on June 29, 2022. The ship entered service with her maiden voyage on July 14, 2022. The ship reportedly cost approximately US$1.1 billion (equivalent to $1.210 billion in 2025).

The Wish class is slightly larger than the preceding Dream class, with a gross tonnage of approximately 144,000, compared with about 130,000 for Dream-class ships, while retaining the same number of guest cabins. During development, the class was known internally as the Triton class. The class also marked several firsts for Disney Cruise Line, including the adoption of liquefied natural gas (LNG) as a lower-emission fuel and the use of azimuthing podded propulsion (Azipod).

== History ==
In March 2016, Disney Cruise Line announced that it had commissioned two new ships, described as larger than Disney Dream and Disney Fantasy but with an equivalent number of staterooms. A third ship of the class was announced on July 15, 2017, at the D23 Expo. In March 2018, Disney Cruise Line released the first rendering of its new generation of cruise ships. The 140,000-ton cruise liners would be LNG-powered and would accommodate at least 2,500 guests. In January 2019, the codename for the class of ship was confirmed as Triton in public documents published by Port Canaveral. However it is now following the standard naming of class after the first ship.

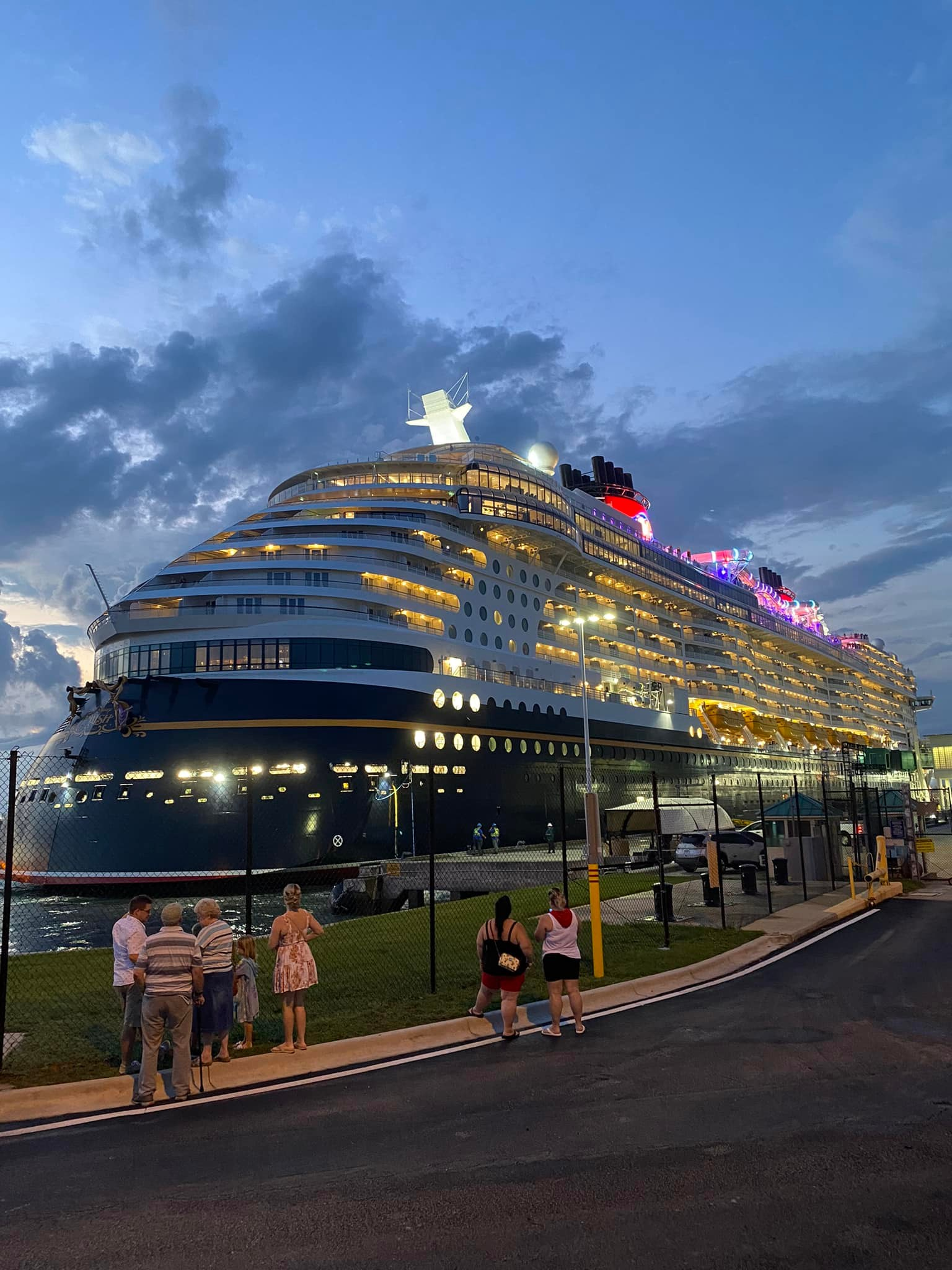
Disney Wish arriving at Port Canaveral on June 20, 2022

On August 25, 2019, the fifth ship was officially announced as the Disney Wish at the D23 Expo. Construction began in March 2020 at Meyer Werft, Germany, with the delivery date later changed due to the COVID-19 pandemic. Also announced at the D23 Expo was that Rapunzel would feature as the stern character on Disney Wish, with The Walt Disney Company releasing the design mock-ups for the ship, including a render of Cinderella as the ship's atrium character.

On April 8, 2021, during the keel laying ceremony, it was announced that Captain Minnie would be the centerpiece of the Disney Wish. On April 29, 2021, Disney Cruise Line shared a first look at their newest ship, Disney Wish, set to embark in mid-2022. Disney Wish has 1,250 staterooms, along with several restaurants, immersive spaces and experiences themed to Walt Disney Pictures, Marvel Cinematic Universe, Star Wars, and Pixar characters, plus the AquaMouse, the world's first Disney attraction at sea.

On February 3, 2022, it was announced that Disney Wish's inaugural sailings were pushed back from June 9 to July 14, 2022, due to shipyard delays. On February 11, 2022, Disney Wish completed her float out in Papenburg, Germany, where the stern figure Rapunzel was revealed for the first time. The ship left Papenburg in March 2022. In May 2022, it was announced that the ship would dock at Port Canaveral on June 20, followed by a livestreamed christening ceremony and a cruise for news media and travel experts on June 29.

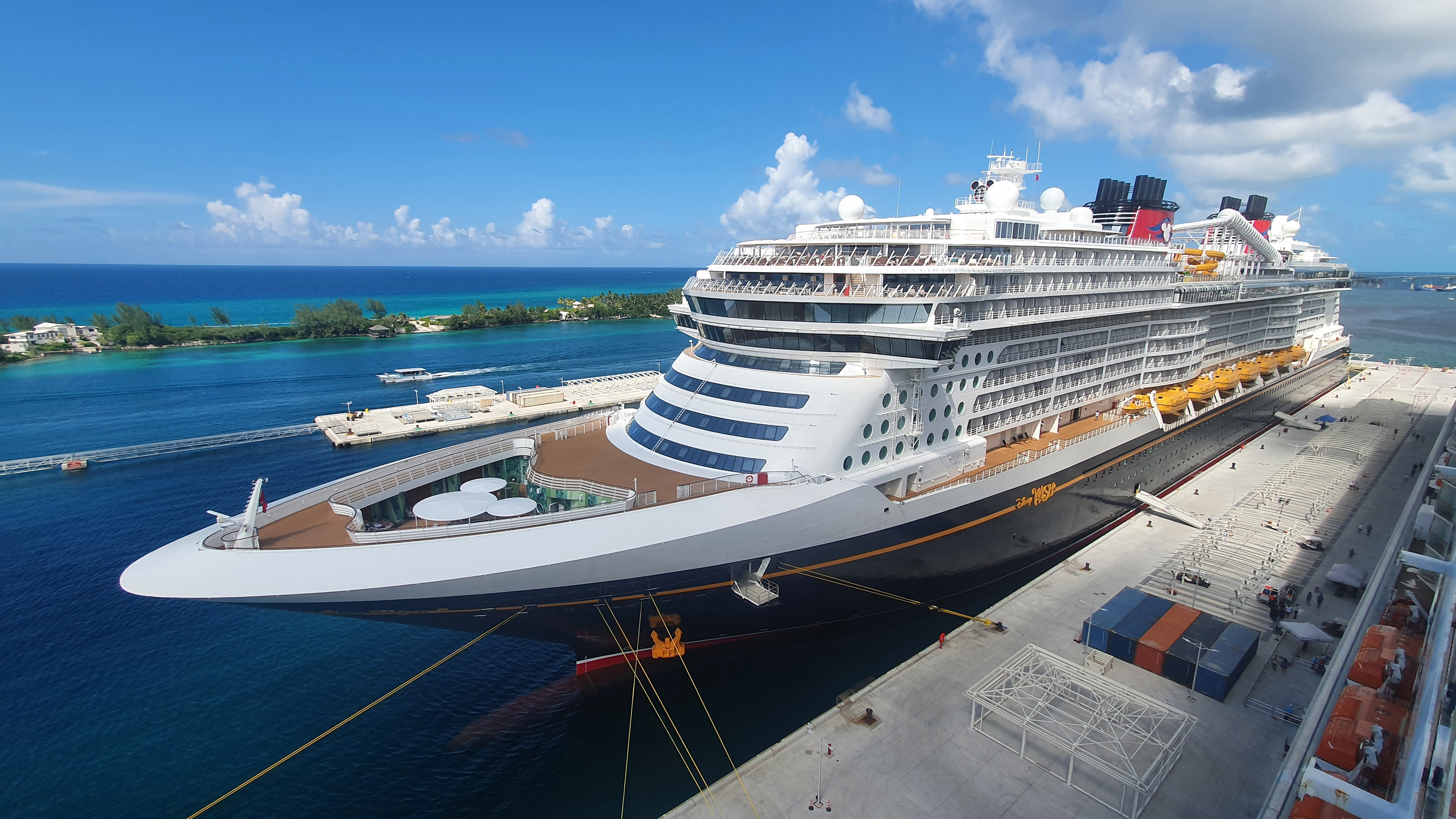
Disney Wish in Nassau on August 20, 2022

On June 9, 2022, Disney Wish was officially handed over to Disney Cruise Line, with the shipyard stating that the ship sailed to Portugal and Castaway Cay before her transatlantic voyage to Port Canaveral. She arrived at Port Canaveral on June 20, 2022, where she was welcomed by Mickey and Minnie Mouse. On June 21, 2022, the ship's first test cruise was cancelled, due to the ship not being ready. The following day, the second test cruise scheduled for June 24, 2022 was also cancelled to focus on the christening ceremony. On June 24, 2022, all past, present, and future Make-A-Wish children were announced to be the godchildren of the ship. On June 29, 2022, Disney Wish was officially christened by three ambassadors of the Make-A-Wish children before embarking on her 3-night christening cruise for the media to Castaway Cay.

On July 14, 2022, Disney Wish officially entered service and embarked on her maiden voyage, a five-night Bahamian cruise stopping at Nassau and Castaway Cay.

On December 24, 2022, National Geographic released a documentary Making the Disney Wish: Disney's Newest Cruise Ship showing the making of the Disney Wish and her design process. It was directed, written, and produced by Chad Cohen, with Bethany Jones also writing and producing, alongside Disney Yellow Shoes. Filming occurred from June 2021 shortly after construction began until its maiden voyage in July 2022. The film debuted on Disney+ on February 17, 2023.

== Design ==
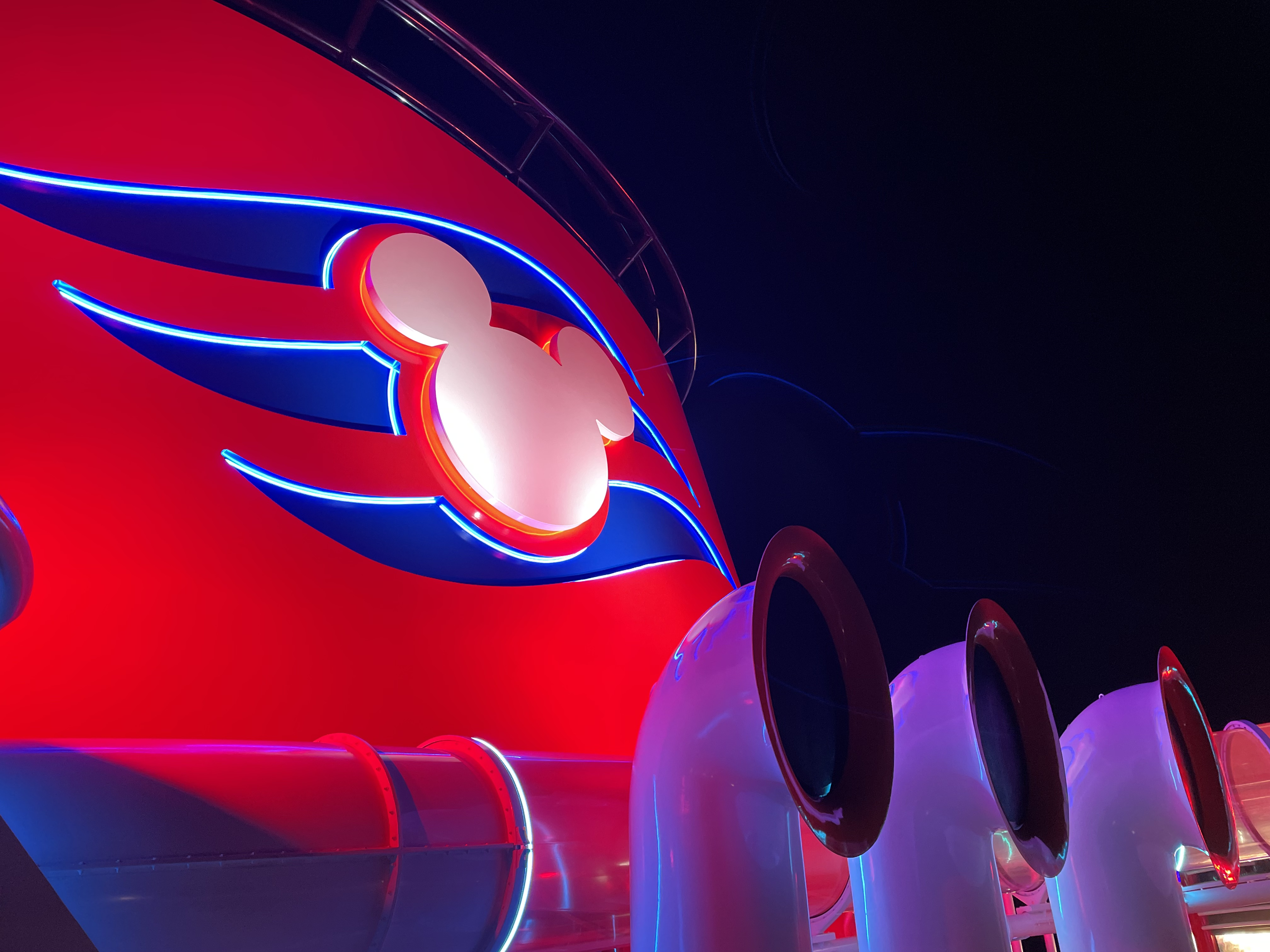
The Wish's rear smokestack

Disney Wish has a gross tonnage of 144,000 GT, a length of 1,119 ft, and a width of 128 ft. Disney Wish has a capacity of 1,555 crew and 4,000 passengers with 1,254 staterooms.

Disney Wish was announced to play songs from Disney movies and parks using its horns, specifically: "A Dream Is a Wish Your Heart Makes" from Cinderella, "Be Our Guest" from Beauty and the Beast, "Yo Ho (A Pirate's Life for Me)" from Pirates of the Caribbean, the Pinocchio songs "When You Wish Upon a Star" and "Hi-Diddle-Dee-Dee (An Actor's Life for Me)", "Do You Want to Build a Snowman?" from Frozen, "It's a Small World (After All)", and the "Star Wars theme". Currently, the Disney Wish is revealed to have 18 horns though it is speculated to have more than the Dream class.

The Disney Wish also incorporates a New Orleans-themed design, which can be seen in its ceiling full of flowers in The Bayou section.

== Recreation ==
=== On-board activities ===
Activities aboard Disney Wish include: The Incredibles: Hero Zone that can be used for various sports activities, Olaf's Royal Picnic and Disney Uncharted Adventure AR Experience. Disney Wish also includes various youth activities including:

- Disney's Oceaneer Club, with Marvel Super Hero Academy, Walt Disney Imagineering Lab, Fairytale Hall and Star Wars: Cargo Bay
- Vibe, designed exclusively for teens
- The Hideaway
- Edge, designed exclusively for tweens
- "it's a small world" nursery

The ship features the first Disney attraction at sea, called the AquaMouse, based on The Wonderful World of Mickey Mouse with music by Christopher Willis. It features two new storylines that alternate on different days of the cruise: "Swiss Meltdown" and "Scuba Scramble".

=== Entertainment ===
Disney Wish includes three theatres:

- Walt Disney Theatre (1,274 capacity; live original productions: The Little Mermaid, Disney Seas the Adventure, and Disney's Aladdin: A Musical Spectacular)
- Wonderland Cinema (84 capacity; screens motion pictures)
- Never Land Cinema (86 capacity; screens motion pictures)

=== Rotational dining ===
Every night of a Disney Wish cruise, guests dine at a different restaurant. This is called "rotational dining". On a Disney ship guests rotate along with their servers which helps develop the relationship between diner and wait staff.

The rotational dining restaurants on Disney Wish are 1923, located on deck 3 midship, Worlds of Marvel located on deck 4 aft, and Arendelle: a Frozen Dining Adventure located on deck 5 aft:

- The 1923 restaurant embodies old Hollywood styles.
- The Worlds of Marvel includes the immersive family dining experience "Avengers: Quantum Encounter". The experience takes place during dinner with interactive elements and a full CGI recreation of the Wish's upper decks. Paul Rudd, Evangeline Lilly, Anthony Mackie, Brie Larson, Kerry Condon, Ross Marquand, and Iman Vellani reprised their Marvel Cinematic Universe roles. Imagineer Danny Handke directed "Avengers: Quantum Encounter", with a script by himself, Steven Spiegel, and Michael Waldron, and music composed by Michael Tavera. Sequence directors include Nia DaCosta, Chris Waitt, and Bradford Burah.
- Arendelle: A Frozen Dining Adventure takes place in the palace, where guests are attending an engagement party for Anna and Kristoff, joined by other Frozen characters.

As well as rotational dining, the Disney Wish also has two specialty restaurants: PALO Steakhouse and Enchanté, which incur an additional cost and are exclusively for adults. Both of these restaurants are located on deck 12 towards the rear of the ship.
