= Lookout Cay at Lighthouse Point =

Private peninsula in the Bahamas

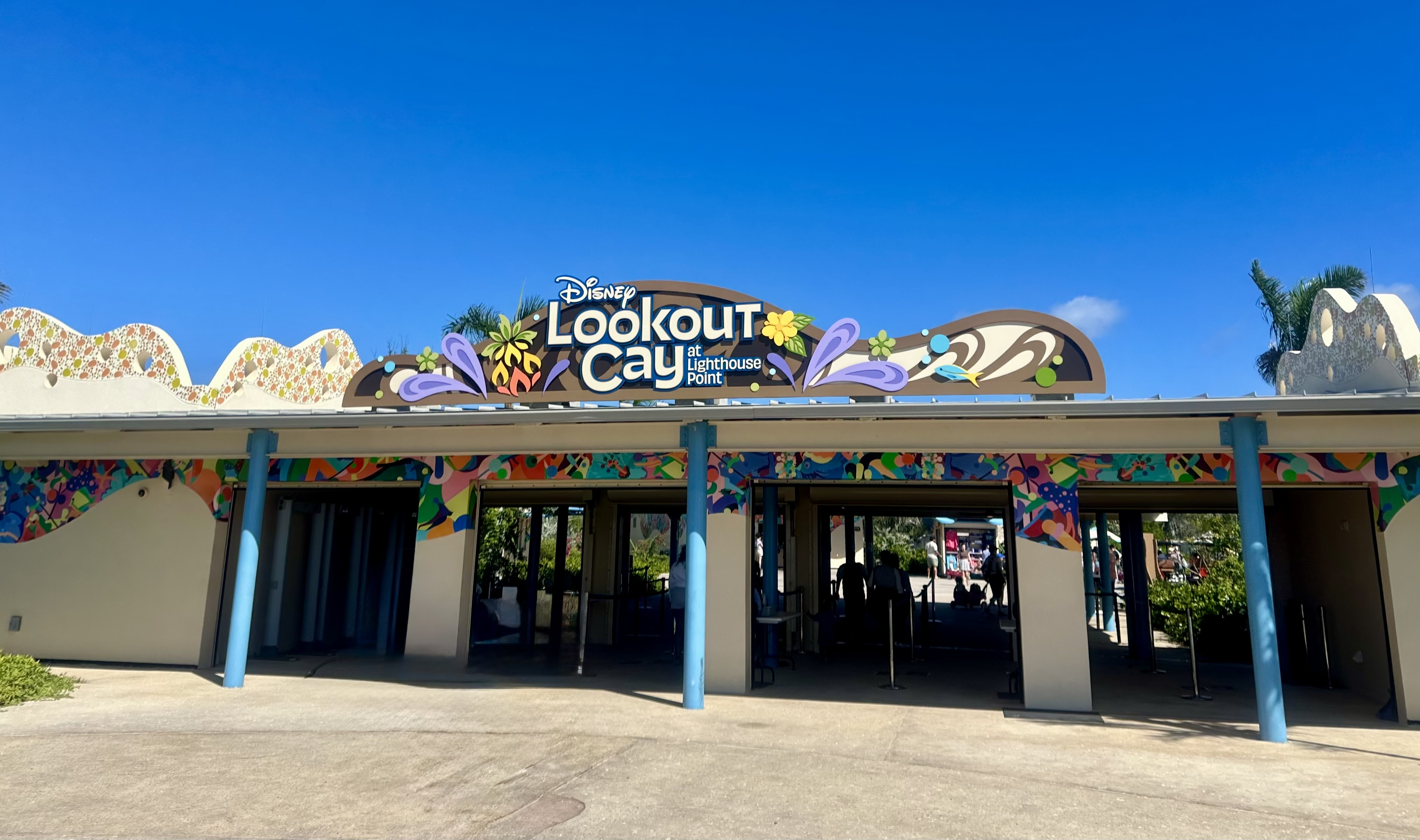
- Entrance to Lookout Cay at Lighthouse Point

- Location in the Bahamas Location in the Caribbean

Geography
- Location: Bannerman Town, South Eleuthera, The Bahamas
- Coordinates: 24°37′23″N 76°08′46″W
- Type: Peninsula
- Archipelago: Lucayan
- Adjacent to: Atlantic Ocean
- Area: 600 acres (240 ha)

Administration
- Bahamas
- District: South Eleuthera

Additional information
- Time zone: EST (UTC-5)
  - Summer (DST): EDT (UTC-4)

Disney's Lookout Cay at Lighthouse Point is a privately owned port in The Bahamas that serves as an exclusive destination for Disney Cruise Line ships. It is located on Lighthouse Point, located southeast of Bannerman Town on the island of Eleuthera. Unlike Disney's first exclusive Bahamian destination, Castaway Cay which is located on a private island, Lookout Cay occupies a privately controlled peninsula that remains part of the larger, inhabited island of Eleuthera.

In March 2019, The Walt Disney Company purchased the Lighthouse Point property from the Bahamian government, giving the company long-term control over the site while it continues to fall under Bahamian laws and governance. This area opened June 6, 2024 with the Disney Magic being the first ship to dock there.

== History ==
Following the 2016 expansion of its cruise fleet, Disney sought an additional exclusive destination in The Bahamas to support increased capacity. The company initially considered Egg Island, but abandoned the plan after local opposition and environmental concerns, including potential reef impacts.

In March 2019, Disney announced an agreement to purchase the Lighthouse Point property on Eleuthera from the Bahamian government. The site had previously been owned by former Bahamian House of Assembly member George Baker and was sold in 2008 to developers who received approval for a large luxury resort project that would have significantly altered the area's salt ponds and wetlands; the project was never built. Listed for US$33 million in 2012, the asking price had fallen to US$20 million by 2018.

As with Egg Island, opposition emerged following reports of Disney's interest. A "Save Lighthouse Point" campaign was launched, supported by several environmental and community organizations. Disney stated the project would emphasize environmental protection, sustainability, job creation, and the celebration of Bahamian culture.

Disney completed an Environmental Impact Assessment in March 2021, and the government released its report on public consultation in July. Final environmental clearance was granted in November 2021.

The 919-acre site includes 758 acres (307 ha) purchased by Disney and 161 acres (65 ha) of retained Crown land. Disney donated 190 acres (77 ha) for use as a public park, including a beach and access road, and transferred the southernmost 3 acres (1.2 ha), containing the historic lighthouse, to the government. Bahamian citizens and residents were granted non-commercial access to the property.

Up to 152 acres are designated for development. As of 2024, approximately 16 percent of the site, including donated lands, had been developed, with plans to develop no more than 20 percent overall. Disney stated that sustainable construction practices were used and that up to 90 percent of the destination's electricity is supplied by solar energy.

The company committed to hiring and training Bahamians and to increasing calls to other Bahamian ports, including Nassau and Freeport by 30–40 percent compared with 2018 levels.

Disney Imagineer Joe Rohde, known for projects including Disney's Animal Kingdom and Aulani, initially oversaw the project prior to his retirement on January 4, 2021.

Construction workers were hired in March 2022, with site work beginning the following month. The destination was officially named Lookout Cay at Lighthouse Point during Destination D23 in September 2023, and opened to guests on June 6, 2024.

== Features ==
=== Transportation ===
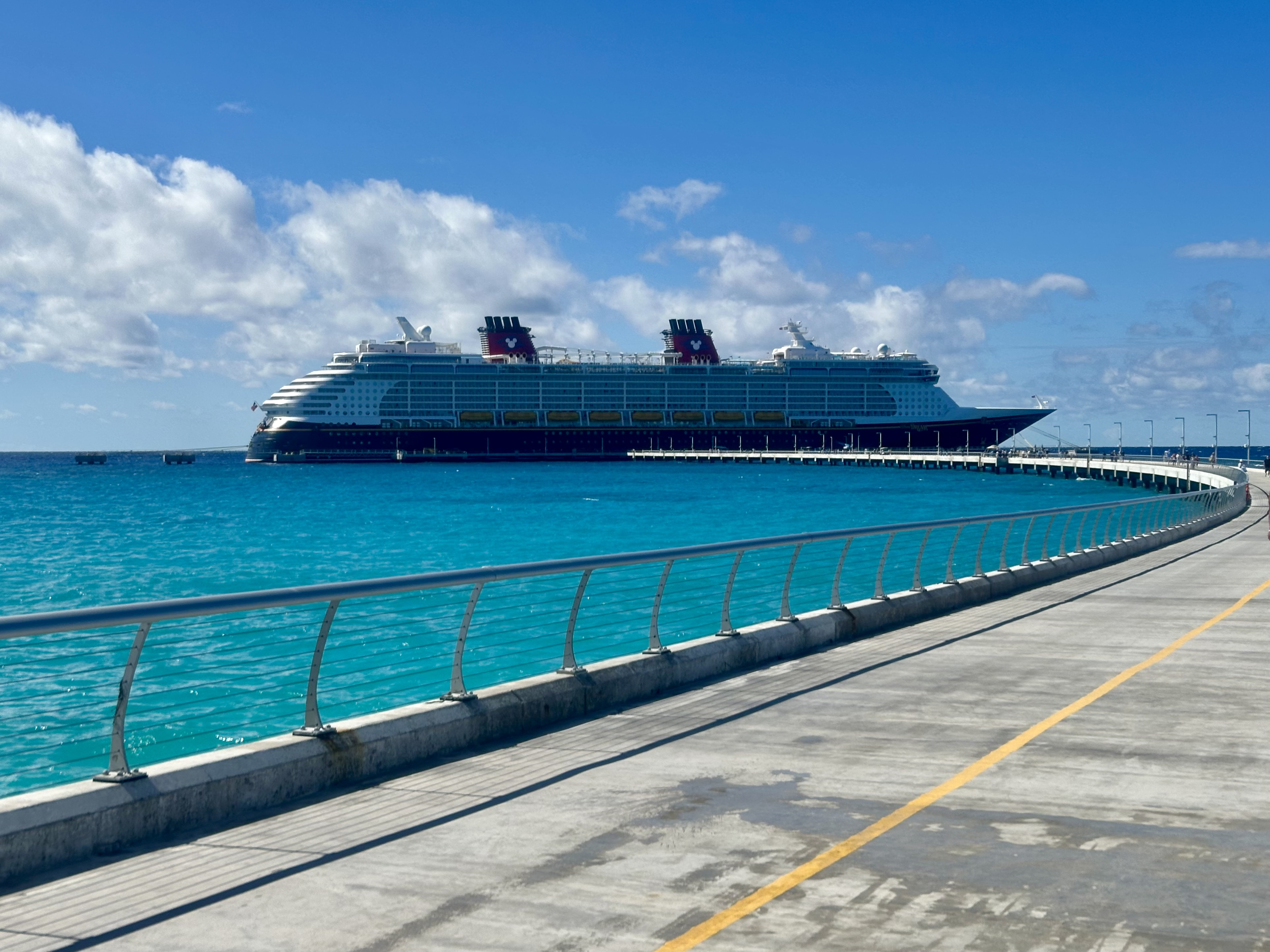
Disney Dream docked at Turbot Berth, pictured from the pier to Lookout Cay

At Lookout Cay, Disney Cruise Line ships dock alongside an open-trestle pier known as Turbot Berth, which connects to the shore and Mabrika Cove via an approximately 1/2-mile-long (800 m) walkway. The pier's design was intended to address environmental concerns related to water flow, marine life, coral reefs, and sediment disruption. It was routed to avoid existing coral reefs, and any viable individual corals within the pier's footprint were relocated. Extending the open-trestle pier from shore to deep water eliminated the need to dredge a ship channel. A tram operates between Mabrika Cove, near the pier walkway, and the Goombay Cultural Center, which is located near most of Lighthouse Point's guest amenities. Some guests have criticized the length of the pier walk and tram wait times, particularly in comparison to Disney's Castaway Cay, where the pier walk is approximately 1/5-mile (320 m) and tram use is optional.

=== Amenities ===
The amenities include multiple food and beverage venues, such as the True-True BBQ, True-True Too BBQ, and Serenity Bay BBQ, as well as several bars including Blue Ribbon, Watering Hole, Reef & Wreck, and Sandsational Smoothies. The peninsula features multiple beaches, attractions, Disney character meet-and-greet experiences, and retail merchandise locations. Additional recreational offerings include a designated nature trail, bicycle rentals, and private cabana rentals located in Mabrika Cove and Serenity Bay.

=== Access ===
Disney Cruise Line's agreement with the Bahamian government allows for citizens and residents of the Bahamas to access Lighthouse Point for non-commercial purposes.

This is in addition to the access provided for by Bahamian law, which states that all land in the country up to the high water mark is public property and must be available for any Bahamian to access.

== See also ==
- List of islands of The Bahamas
- Castaway Cay, Disney's first private island
- Private island
