= Disney Magic =

Cruise ship operated by Disney Cruise Line

- Disney Magic in September 2018

History

Bahamas
- Name: Disney Magic
- Owner: The Walt Disney Company
- Operator: Disney Cruise Line
- Port of registry: Nassau, Bahamas
- Ordered: April 27, 1995
- Builder: Fincantieri (Marghera, Italy)
- Cost: US$400 million (equivalent to $790 million in 2025)
- Yard number: 5989
- Laid down: October 31, 1996
- Launched: May 13, 1997
- Sponsored by: Patricia Disney
- Christened: July 28, 1998
- Completed: June 30, 1998
- Maiden voyage: July 30, 1998
- In service: 1998–present
- Identification: IMO number: 9126807; MMSI number: 308516000; Call sign: C6PT7
- Status: In service

General characteristics
- Class & type: Magic-class cruise ship
- Tonnage: 83,338 GT
- Length: 294 m (964 ft)
- Beam: 32.25 m (105.8 ft)
- Height: 52.3 m (172 ft)
- Draft: 7.7 m (25 ft)
- Decks: 11
- Installed power: 5 × 16-cylinder Sulzer diesel engines turning Ansaldo generators producing 11,520 kW (15,450 hp) each
- Propulsion: 2 × 19 MW (25,000 hp) GE motors turning propellers; 3 × 1,800 kW (2,400 hp) Fincantieri bow thrusters; 2 × 1,800 kW (2,400 hp) Fincantieri stern thrusters
- Speed: Service: 21.5 kn (39.8 km/h; 24.7 mph); Maximum: 24.7 kn (45.7 km/h; 28.4 mph)
- Capacity: 1,750 passengers (double occupancy); 2,713 passengers (maximum)
- Crew: 950
- Notes: Bow character: Sorcerer Mickey; Atrium character: Helmsman Mickey; Stern character: Goofy

Disney Magic is a cruise ship owned and operated by Disney Cruise Line, a subsidiary of the Walt Disney Company. She is the first ship in the Disney Cruise Line fleet and the lead vessel of the Magic class. The ship was followed by her sister ship, Disney Wonder (1999).

The Magic class was ordered on April 27, 1995, and built by Fincantieri at its shipyard in Marghera, Italy. Construction of the vessel began with the keel laying on October 31, 1996, and the ship was launched on May 13, 1997. She was completed on June 30, 1998, christened on July 28, 1998, and entered service with her maiden voyage on July 30, 1998. The ship reportedly cost approximately US$400 million (equivalent to $790 million in 2025).

Disney Magic contains 11 public decks, can accommodate 2,700 passengers in 875 staterooms, and has a crew of approximately 950. The ship features an Art Deco design incorporating stylistic references to ocean liners of the early 20th-century, including a long, low profile and a black hull with red accents, which also reflect the colors associated with Mickey Mouse. The vessel carries yellow lifeboats that match the color of Mickey's shoes rather than the standard safety orange, a choice that required a waiver under international maritime regulations.

== History ==
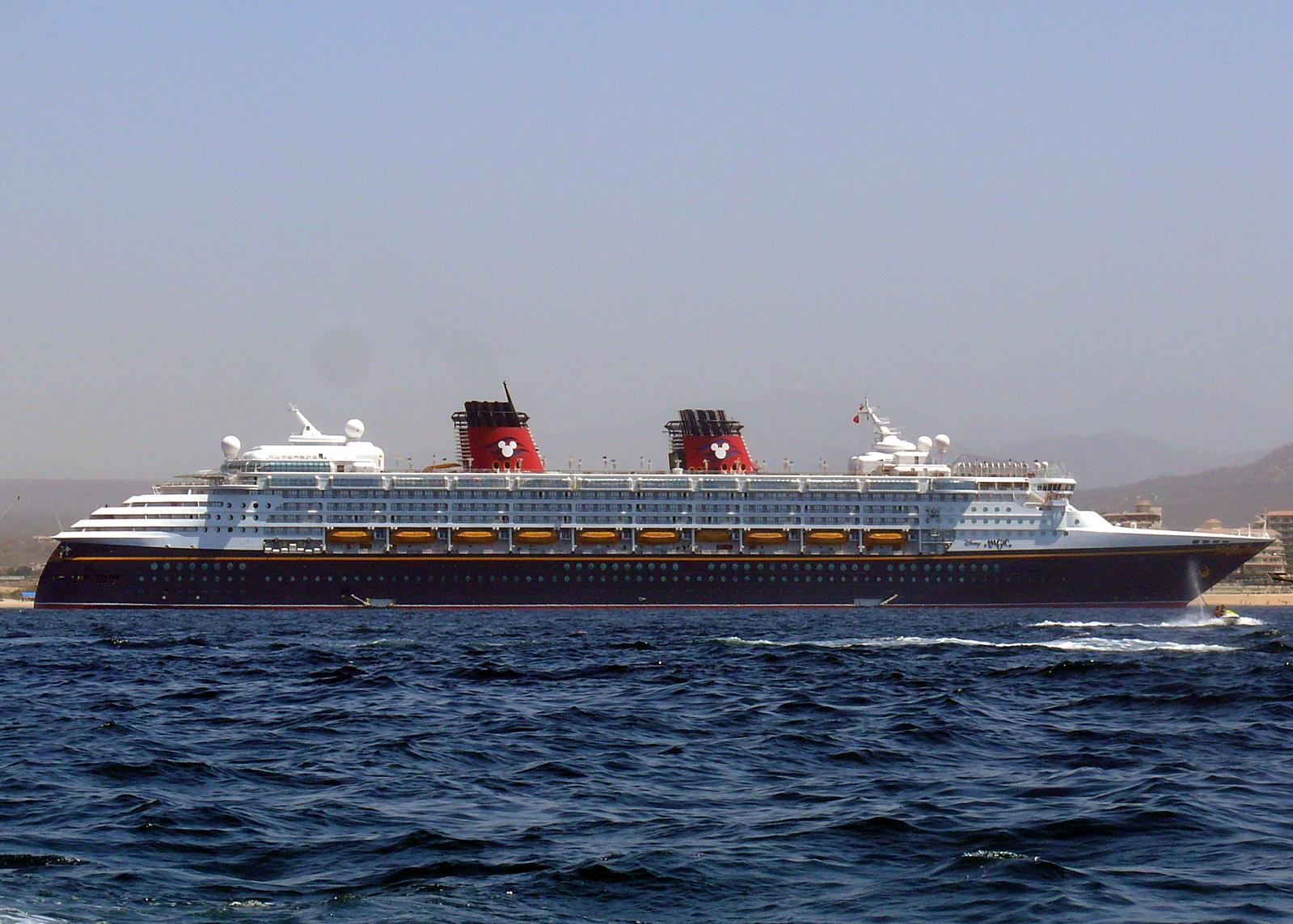
Disney Magic at Cabo San Lucas, Mexico

By February 1994, Disney had finalized initial designs for its first cruise ships. On April 27, 1995, Disney Cruise Line ordered Disney Magic and Disney Wonder from Fincantieri in Italy. The ships were constructed in two sections, with the bow built at Fincantieri's Ancona shipyard and the stern at its Marghera shipyard. The bow section was later towed to Marghera, where the two halves were joined. Construction of Disney Magic began with the keel laying on October 31, 1996. The ship was launched on May 13, 1997, completed on June 30, 1998, and christened on July 28, 1998, by Patricia Disney.

The planned maiden voyage for Disney Magic was March 12, 1998. Ticket sales began in September 1997, and in January 1997 the first ticket for the ship's inaugural voyage was raffled on the Lifetime television channel. Construction delays related to Fincantieri's concurrent work on Rotterdam limited available labor, and additional setbacks were caused by supplier delays and adverse weather conditions. As a result, the maiden voyage was postponed several times.

Disney Magic began service on July 30, 1998, from Port Canaveral in Florida, initially sailing three- to four-night cruises to Nassau, Bahamas and Castaway Cay.

The ship has been periodically repositioned for seasonal cruises, including Southern California, Vancouver, the Mediterranean, Galveston, Texas, and New York City. During these deployments, she operated itineraries to Mexico, Alaska, Europe and New England.

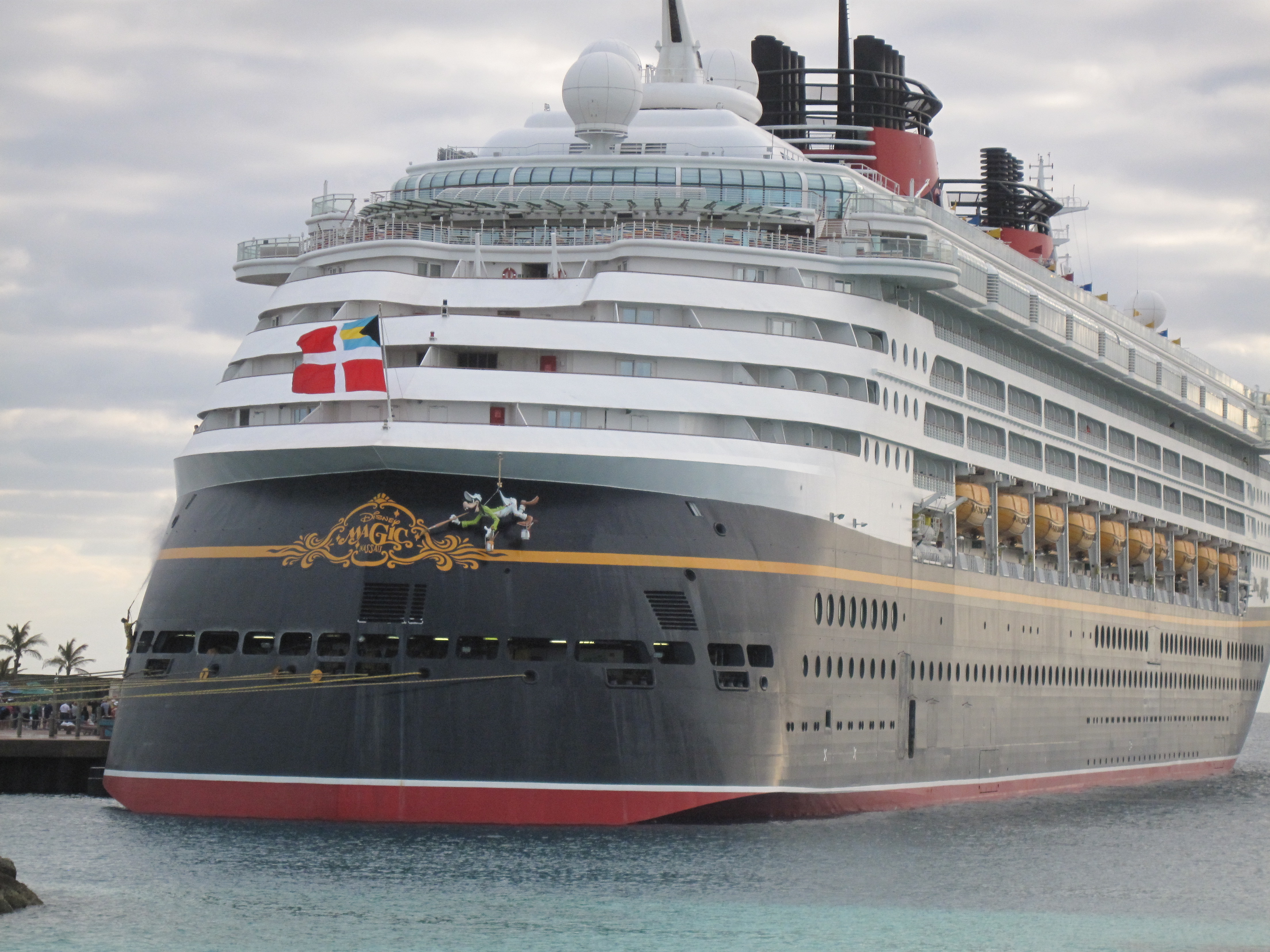
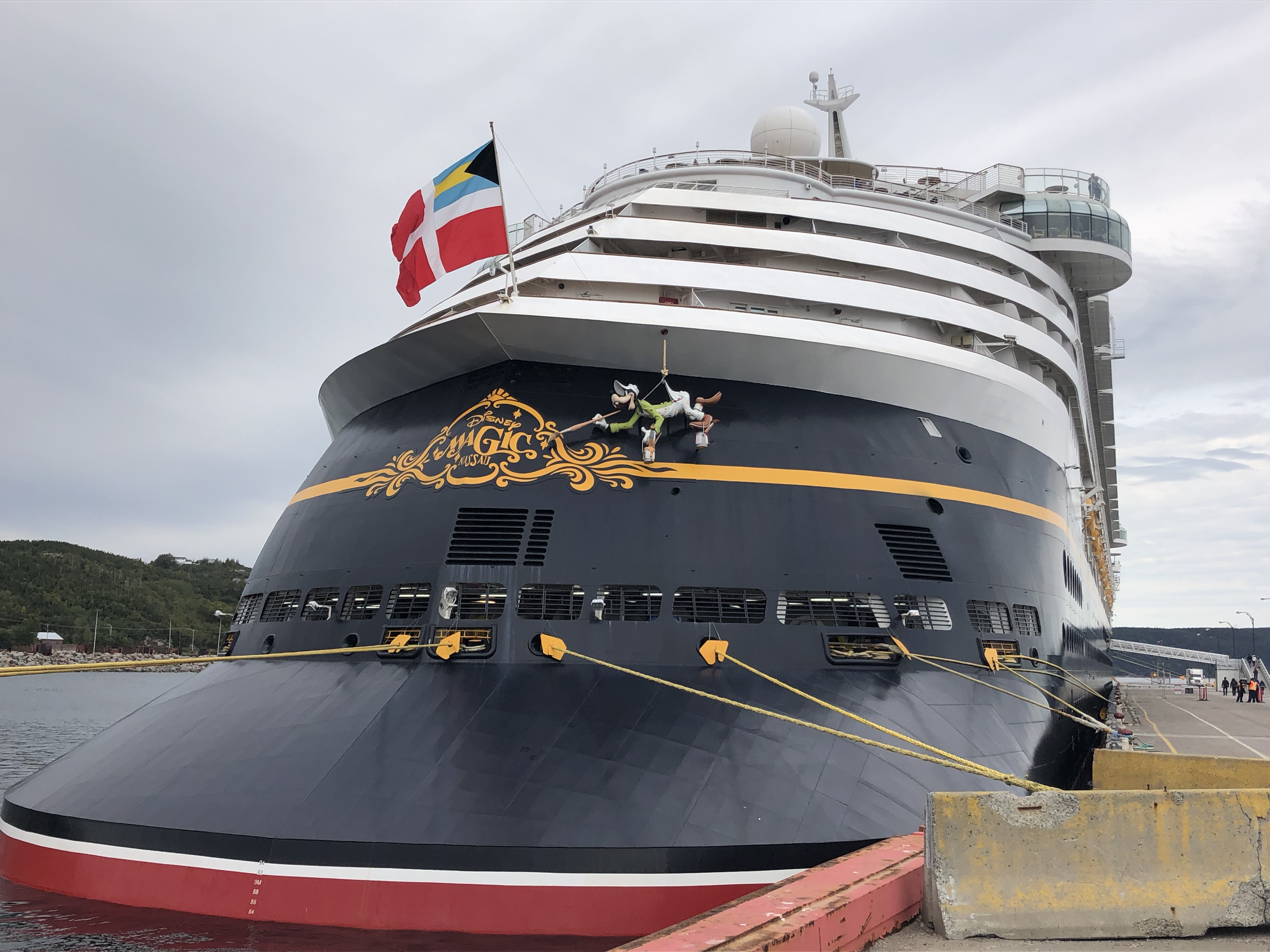
Disney Magic before (left) and after (right) the addition of its "ducktail"

In September 2013, Disney Magic underwent a dry dock at Navantia's shipyard in Cádiz, Spain. A 6-meter (20 ft) "ducktail" sponson was added to improve efficiency. Updates included renovations to cabins, lounges, restaurants, and the spa, and new features such as "Marvel's Avengers Academy", AquaDunk, and AquaLab. Several restaurants and clubs were replaced or re-themed in later years.

During the COVID-19 pandemic, Disney Magic was anchored in Dover, England from May 2020 and operated UK-only "staycation cruises." She returned to Miami in October 2021 and resumed Bahamian itineraries, returning to Europe in summer 2022 before sailing back to the United States for fall deployments.

In May 2023, Disney Magic completed a three-week dry dock in Freeport, Bahamas, during which shore power systems were installed to connect the ship to port electricity and reduce emissions. The Soul Cat Lounge, an adults-only jazz club–themed area inspired by the movie Soul, was added, and the concierge lounge and staterooms were renovated.

== Recreation ==
=== Entertainment ===
Entertainment on Disney Magic includes live Broadway-style shows with many Disney characters at the Walt Disney Theater, the Buena Vista movie theater, which features both Disney films and first-run movies, several night clubs and lounges, several pools, and many Disney-themed parties and celebrations, including a Sail-Away Celebration, Pirate Night, and sometimes a Marvel or Star Wars Day at Sea.

On the ship's forward funnel, there is a 24-by-14 foot LED screen known as the Funnel Vision, due to its location on the back of the front funnel, where guests can watch various movies and shows either from the deck or from inside Goofy's Pool.

Shows from the Walt Disney Theatre may include: All Aboard, Let The Magic Begin, Twice Charmed: A Twist on the Cinderella Story, Tangled the Musical, Disney Dreams: An Enchanted Classic, and A Final Farewell Show. Former shows included Villains Tonight!, which was replaced by Tangled.

=== Youth clubs ===
The ship features a nursery, Oceaneer Club, Oceaneer Lab, Edge, and Vibe for kids entertainment.

=== Dining ===
Disney Cruise line is known for pioneering the rotational dining setup, in which guests and their wait staff rotate through three differently themed restaurants throughout their cruise. The Disney Magic's restaurants include Lumière's (deck 3, midship), which serves primarily French Cuisine, Rapunzel's Royal Table (deck 3, aft), which serves German-inspired food, and Animator's Palate (deck 4, aft), a venue featured on four of the other Disney cruise ships. Additionally, the upscale, adults-only restaurant Palo, situated on deck 10 at the rear of the ship, requires a separate reservation and serves high-end Italian cuisine.
