= Pinocchio (1940 soundtrack) =

Soundtrack album by various artists
- Released: February 9, 1940
- Recorded: 1939–1940
- Genre: Soundtrack
- Labels: Victor; Disneyland Records; Buena Vista Records

2006 Release

Pinocchio is the soundtrack to the 1940 Walt Disney film of the same name, first released on February 9, 1940. The album was described as being "recorded from the original soundtrack of the Walt Disney Production Pinocchio". According to Walt Disney Records, "this is the first time the phrase 'original soundtrack' was used to refer to a commercially available movie recording."

The soundtrack won an Academy Award for Best Original Score, and the song "When You Wish Upon A Star" won the 1940 Academy Award for Best Original Song and has become Disney's official anthem.

In 2015, a Legacy Collection edition of Pinocchio was released.

== Songs ==
All lyrics are written by Ned Washington; all music is composed by Leigh Harline.

No.	Title	Performer(s)	Length
1.	"When You Wish Upon a Star"	Cliff Edwards	3:16
2.	"Little Wooden Head"	Christian Rub	5:45
3.	"Give A Little Whistle"	Cliff Edwards & Dickie Jones	1:38
4.	"Hi-Diddle-Dee-Dee"	Walter Catlett	1:40
5.	"I've Got No Strings"	Dickie Jones & Patricia Page	2:23
6.	"Hi-Diddle-Dee-Dee (Reprise)"	Walter Catlett	0:22
7.	"When You Wish Upon a Star (Reprise)"	Cliff Edwards	1:27

=== Songs not used in the film ===
Songs written for the film but not used include:

- "I'm a Happy Go Lucky Fellow" (also called "Jiminy Cricket") – Jiminy Cricket (Later used in the 1947 Disney film Fun and Fancy Free)
- "Honest John" – Chorus
- "As I Was Saying to the Duchess" – J. Worthington Foulfellow
- "Three Cheers for Anything" – Lampwick, Pinocchio, Alexander & Other Boys
- "Monstro the Whale" – Chorus
- "Turn on the Old Music Box" – Jiminy Cricket (used in the score of the film when Geppetto dances with Pinocchio)

Three of these songs, however, are used in a multi-record 78-RPM 1950 cover album of the songs released by Decca Records and conducted by Victor Young. Although Cliff Edwards appeared as Jiminy Cricket on the album, no one else from the film cast did. Soprano Julietta Novis, who sung Schubert's Ave Maria on the soundtrack of Disney's Fantasia, sang the song "Little Wooden Head", instead of it being sung by Geppetto. Other singers on the album included the Ken Darby Chorus and the King's Men.

Years later, Disneyland Records issued a true soundtrack album from the film.

== Releases ==
=== Original release ===
The soundtrack was first issued as a collection (Victor P-18) of three 78-rpm singles.

- "When You Wish Upon a Star" b/w "Little Wooden Head" (Victor 26477)
- "Give a Little Whistle" b/w "Hi Diddle Dee Dee" (Victor 26478)
- "I've Got No Strings" b/w "Turn On the Old Music Box" (Victor 26479)

=== 'Original Motion Picture Soundtrack' Picture Disc LP ===
Catalogue number: Disneyland 3102

Side One

1. "When You Wish Upon a Star" – Jiminy Cricket
2. "Cricket Theme" / "Little Wooden Head" (contains Rub's vocals)
3. "The Blue Fairy Arrives" / "When You Wish Upon a Star"
4. "Give a Little Whistle" – Jiminy Cricket / "Pinocchio Goes To School" / "Hi-Diddle-Dee-Dee (An Actor's Life for Me)" – Honest John

Side Two

1. "I've Got No Strings " – Pinocchio
2. "Hi-Diddle-Dee-Dee" – Honest John
3. "The Whale Chase"
4. "Finale: Turn on the Old Music Box and When You Wish Upon a Star – Jiminy Cricket"

=== Current release ===
1. "When You Wish Upon a Star" – 3:15
2. "Little Wooden Head" – 5:45 (this track contains none of the vocals present on this track as presented in the film sung by Christian Rub)
3. "Clock Sequence" – 0:55
4. "Kitten Theme" – 0:40
5. "The Blue Fairy" – 3:28
6. "Give a Little Whistle" – 1:38
7. "Old Geppetto" – 4:44
8. "Off to School" – 4:19
9. "Hi Diddle Dee Dee" – 1:41
10. "So Sorry" – 1:36
11. "I've Got No Strings" – 2:23
12. "Sinister Stromboli" – 2:28
13. "Sad Reunion" – 3:22
14. "Lesson in Lies" – 2:31
15. "Turn On the Old Music Box" – 0:50
16. "Coach to Pleasure Island" – 4:45 (Hi-Diddle-Dee-Dee (reprise) contains none of the vocals as presented on the record and in the film)
17. "Angry Cricket" – 1:20
18. "Transformation" – 3:51
19. "Message from the Blue Fairy" – 1:30
20. "To the Rescue" – 0:34
21. "Deep Ripples" – 1:29
22. "Desolation Theme" – 1:42
23. "Monstro Awakens" – 2:03
24. "Whale Chase" – 3:19
25. "A Real Boy" – 1:42

== See also ==
- Walt Disney Records discography
