= Disney Fantasy =

Cruise ship operated by Disney Cruise Line

Coordinates: 28.4100°N 80.6100°W

- Disney Fantasy in 2026

History

Bahamas
- Name: Disney Fantasy
- Owner: The Walt Disney Company
- Operator: Disney Cruise Line
- Port of registry: Nassau, Bahamas
- Ordered: February 22, 2007
- Builder: Meyer Werft (Papenburg, Germany)
- Cost: US$940 million (equivalent to $1.3 billion in 2025)
- Yard number: S. 688
- Launched: January 10, 2012
- Sponsored by: Mariah Carey
- Christened: February 28, 2012
- Completed: February 9, 2012
- Maiden voyage: March 31, 2012
- In service: 2012–present
- Identification: IMO number: 9445590; MMSI number: 311058700; Call sign: C6ZL6
- Status: In service

General characteristics
- Class & type: Dream-class cruise ship
- Tonnage: 129,690 GT; 12,915 DWT; 104,345 NT
- Displacement: 65,298 t (143,957,000 lb)
- Length: 339.8 m (1,114.8 ft)
- Beam: Breadth: 37 m (121.4 ft) at water line; Maximum: 41.8 m (137.1 ft) at bridge wings
- Height: 66.13 m (217 ft)
- Draft: 8.6 m (28.2 ft) at load line
- Decks: 18 (14 passenger)
- Installed power: 3 × 12-cylinder MAN diesel engines turning Converteam generators producing 14.4 MW (19,300 hp); 2 × 14-cylinder MAN diesel engines turning Converteam generators producing 16.8 MW (22,500 hp)
- Propulsion: 2 × 23 MW (31,000 hp) Converteam motors turning 5-blade inward-turning fixed-pitch propellers; 3 × 3,000 kW (4,000 hp) Wärtsilä bow thrusters; 2 × 3,000 kW (4,000 hp) Wärtsilä stern thrusters
- Speed: Service: 22 kn (41 km/h; 25 mph); Maximum: 24.7 kn (45.7 km/h; 28.4 mph)
- Capacity: 2,500 passengers (double occupancy); 4,000 passengers (maximum)
- Crew: 1,458
- Notes: Bow character: Sorcerer Mickey; Atrium character: Mademoiselle Minnie; Stern characters: Dumbo and Timothy Q. Mouse

Disney Fantasy is a cruise ship owned and operated by Disney Cruise Line, a subsidiary of the Walt Disney Company. She is the fourth ship in the Disney Cruise Line fleet and the second vessel of the Dream class, following Disney Dream (2011).

The Dream class was ordered on February 22, 2007, and built by Meyer Werft at its shipyard in Papenburg, Germany. Construction of the vessel began with the keel laying on February 11, 2011, and the ship was launched on January 10, 2012. She was completed on February 9, 2012, christened on February 28, 2012, and entered service with her maiden voyage on March 31, 2012. The ship reportedly cost approximately US$940 million (equivalent to $1.318 billion in 2025).

As a member of the Dream class, Disney Fantasy represented a significant increase in size over Disney Cruise Line's preceding Magic class. Dream-class ships have a gross tonnage of approximately 130,000, compared with about 84,000 for the Magic class, which had been introduced more than a decade earlier.

== History ==
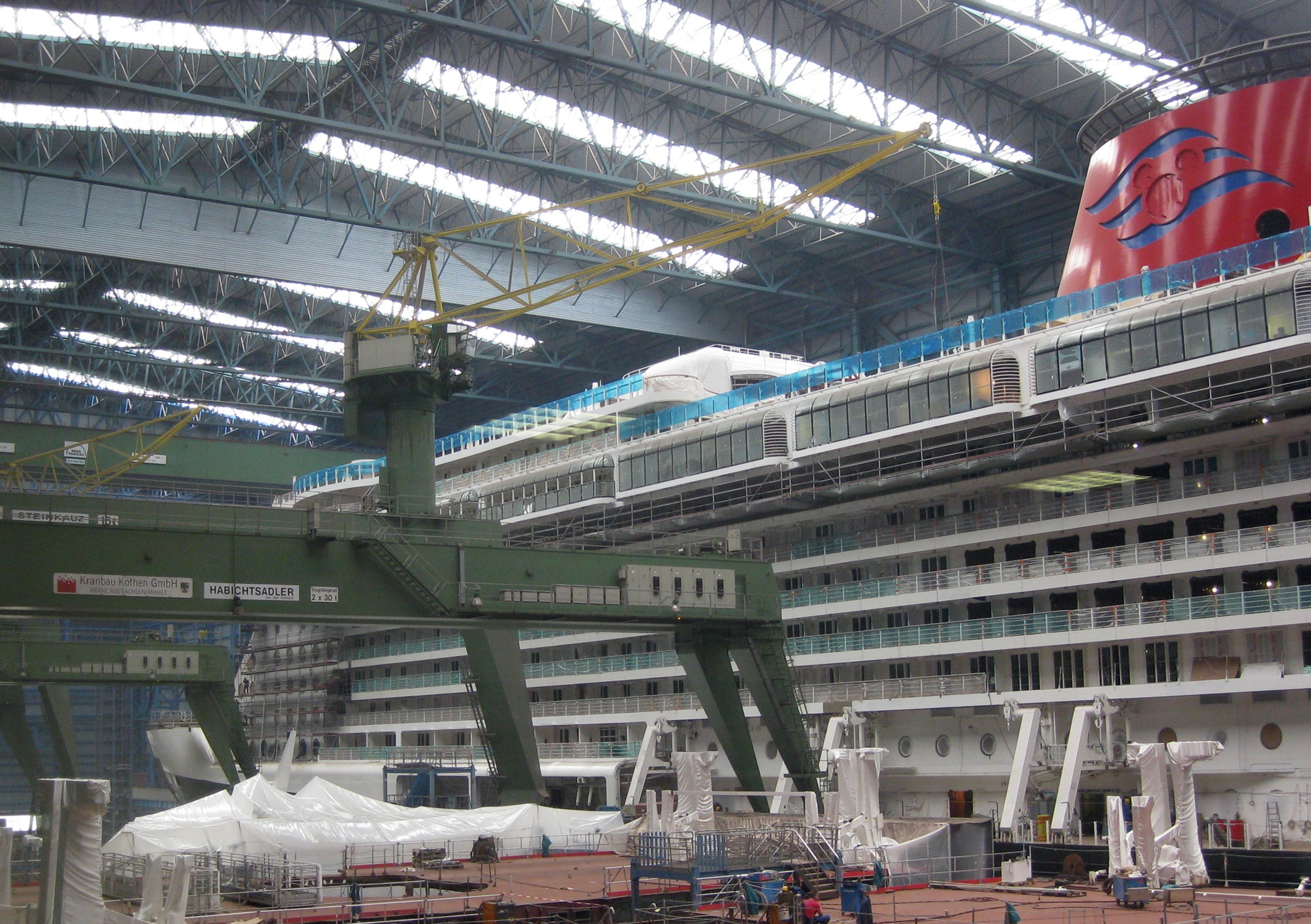
Disney Fantasy at Meyer Werft shipyards in Papenburg, Germany in August 2011

In February 2007, Disney Cruise Line announced that it had commissioned two new ships for its fleet with Meyer Werft shipyards in Papenburg, Germany. The first steel-cut, for scrollwork on the ship's hull, took place in March 2009. Later that month, the two ships were named, with the Disney Fantasy set to enter service on March 31, 2012, a little over a year after her sister vessel, the Disney Dream.

Disney Fantasy is structurally almost identical to Disney Dream, with a gross tonnage of 130,000, a length of 340 m (1,120 ft) and a width of 42 metres (138 ft). Disney Fantasy has 1,250 passenger cabins.

The ship's keel was laid on February 11, 2011. Disney Cruise Line president, Karl Holz, along with Minnie Mouse, officially placed a magic coin beneath the ship's hull. The coin is identical to that which was placed beneath the Disney Dream, however, featured the hull number S688, and the date of the keel laying.

On September 13, 2011, it was announced that the stern character on Disney Fantasy would be Dumbo, the Flying Elephant.

On December 9, 2011, Meyer Werft found several water lines open on the cruise ship. 48 cabins were damaged at a cost of approximately €1 million.

Disney Fantasy was floated out of the building dock on January 10, 2012, at Meyer Werft. Disney Fantasy was delivered to Disney Cruise Line on February 9, 2012, in Bremerhaven, Germany.

Disney Fantasy arrived in the United States for the first time, calling on New York, on February 28, 2012. The ship was formally named on March 1, 2012, in New York City. The "godmother" of the ship is Mariah Carey. A ceremony was held on the ship featuring performances in the Walt Disney Theatre. Neil Patrick Harris hosted and comedian Jerry Seinfeld performed during the show.

Until 2025 Disney Fantasy was based at Disney Cruise Line's terminal at Port Canaveral, Florida, cruising to the Caribbean including visits to Disney's private island Castaway Cay. For the summer 2025 season, it will make its European debut, cruising from Southampton.

Disney Fantasy entered drydock during late September 2025 at Damen Shipyard in Brest, France. The drydock included the renovation of multiple spaces including the addition of a new concierge tower suite, a refreshed poolside food offering, and enhancements to the spa and concierge lounge. The Disney Fantasy returned to service from this period on November 3, 2025.

In March 2020, cruises were suspended due to the COVID-19 pandemic. Disney Cruise Line extended its suspension of all departures several times, finally returning Disney Fantasy to active duty on September 11, 2021. On December 30, 2021, passengers were unable to debark the ship at St. Thomas due to a rise in onboard COVID-19 cases.

== Facilities ==
Disney Fantasy has a water playground with a water coaster (AquaDuck), pop jets, geysers and bubblers featuring Huey, Dewey and Louie, instead of the Waves bar on the pool deck which is found on the Disney Dream. The ship features a nursery, Oceaneer Club, Oceaneer Lab, Edge, and Vibe for children's entertainment.

=== Horns ===
Disney Fantasy can play songs from Disney movies and parks using its 11 horns, specifically: "A Dream Is a Wish Your Heart Makes" from Cinderella, "Be Our Guest" from Beauty and the Beast, "Yo Ho (A Pirate's Life for Me)" from Pirates of the Caribbean, the Pinocchio songs "When You Wish Upon a Star" and "Hi-Diddle-Dee-Dee (An Actor's Life for Me)", "Do You Want to Build a Snowman?" from Frozen, and "It's a Small World (After All)". In addition its musical horns, during the "Star Wars Day At Sea" the ship can sound other horns, including: "The Imperial March" and a segment of the "Star Wars (Main Title)", and when in New York City, can play the beginning of "New York, New York" by Frank Sinatra.

=== Entertainment ===
Disney Fantasy also includes two theaters:

- Walt Disney Theater: 1,340 seats; hosts live original productions such as Disney's Aladdin: A Musical Spectacular, Disney’s Believe, and Frozen, A Musical Spectacular.
- Buena Vista Theater: 399 seats; screens motion pictures.

=== Dining ===
Disney Fantasy employs a rotational dining system in which guests dine at a different restaurant each evening. The main dining venues include Enchanted Garden (deck 2, midship), which serves French-inspired cuisine in a setting themed to Disney fairy-tale films; Royal Court (deck 3, midship), designed to resemble a French conservatory with lighting that transitions from daylight to sunset and night during the meal; and Animator's Palate (deck 3, aft), a venue featured across four other Disney Cruise Line ships.

Adults-only specialty restaurants include Palo, serving Northern Italian cuisine, and Remy, offering French cuisine; both are located on deck 12 at the rear of the ship and require an additional fee.
