= Disney Cruise Line =

Cruise line operation, subsidiary of The Walt Disney Company

Magical Cruise Company, Limited

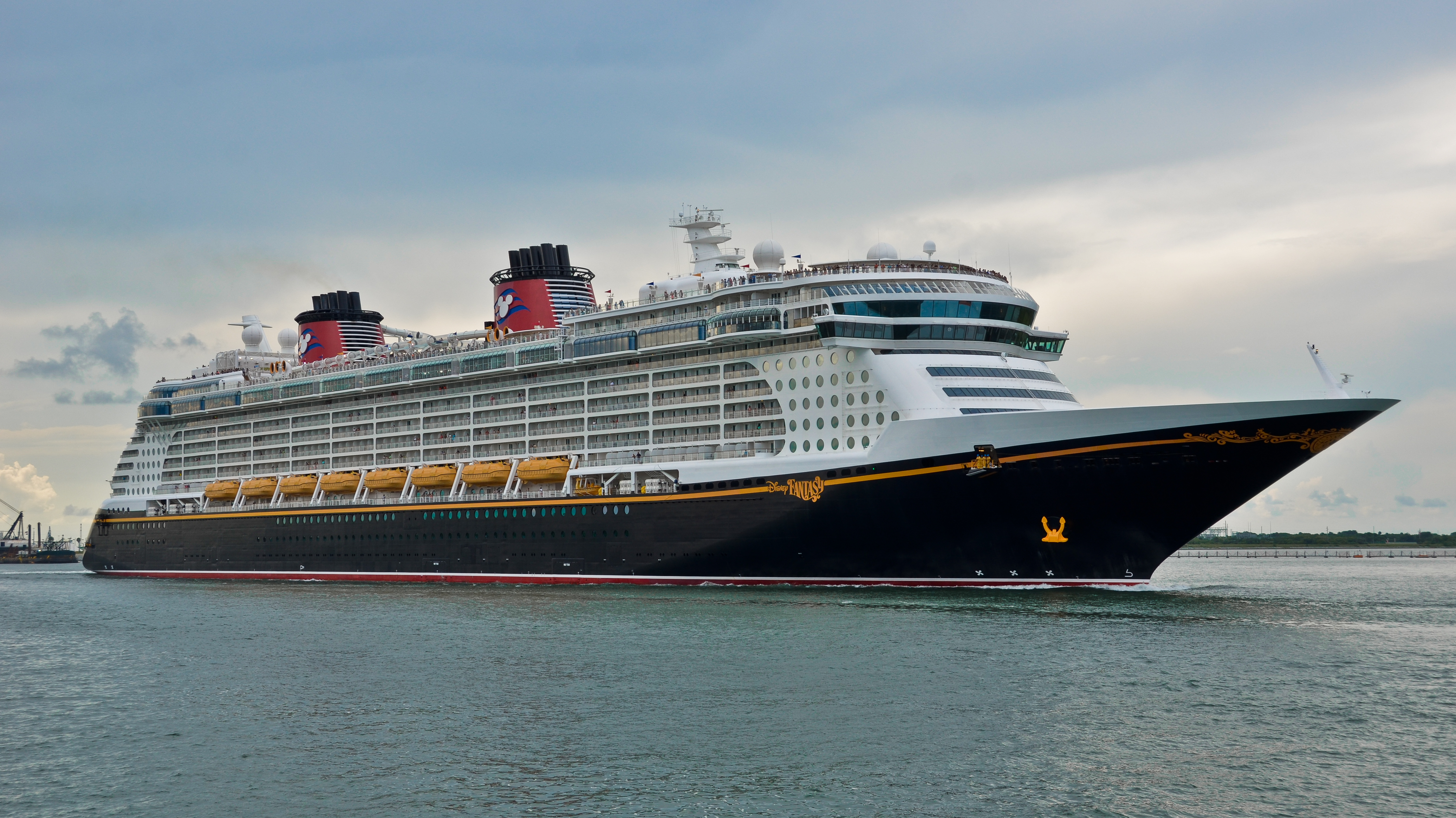
- Disney Fantasy in 2015
- Trade name: Disney Cruise Line
- Formerly: Disney Vacation Cruises; Devonson Cruise Company, Limited
- Type: Subsidiary
- Industry: Tourism
- Founded: February 6, 1996; 30 years ago
- Headquarters: Celebration, Florida, U.S. (operational); London, England (legal); Nassau, Bahamas (vessel registry)
- Key people: Natacha Rafalski (president, Disney Signature Experiences); Tracy Wilson (SVP & GM, Disney Cruise Line)
- Revenue: ▲US$2.5 billion (FY24)
- Operating income: ▲US$307 million (FY24)
- Net income: ▲US$328 million (FY24)
- Total assets: ▲US$3.3 billion (FY24)
- Owner: The Walt Disney Company
- Parent: Disney Signature Experiences
- Website: Official website
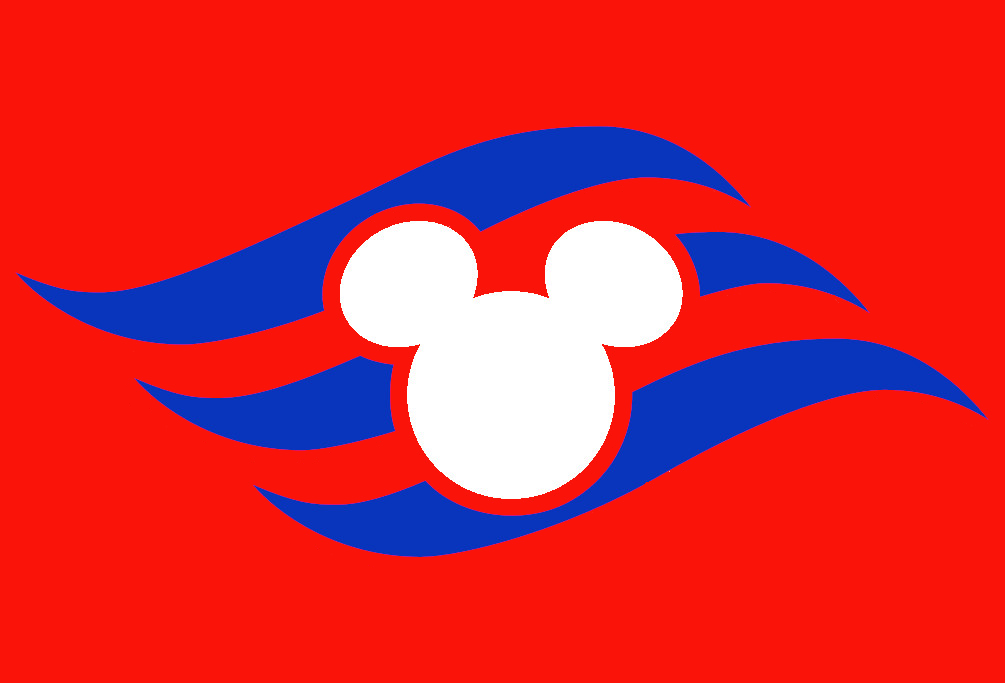
- Footnotes; Financials as of fiscal year (FY) ended September 28, 2025. References: House Flag

Disney Cruise Line is the cruise line subsidiary of the Walt Disney Company. Incorporated in 1996 as Magical Cruise Company, Limited with the launch of its first vessel, the company is domiciled in London, England, with its operational headquarters in Celebration, Florida. As of 2026, Disney Cruise Line operates eight ships: Disney Magic, Disney Wonder, Disney Dream, Disney Fantasy, Disney Wish, Disney Treasure, Disney Destiny, and Disney Adventure. Five additional ships are on order and are expected to enter service by 2031. The cruise line operates two private destinations in the Bahamas used exclusively by Disney ships: Castaway Cay, a 1,000-acre (400 ha) private island, and Lookout Cay at Lighthouse Point, a 600-acre (240 ha) destination on the southern end of Eleuthera. Disney Cruise Line also operates exclusive-use cruise terminals in Florida at Port Canaveral and Port Everglades.

== History ==
=== Origins and formation ===
In 1985, Premier Cruise Line became Disney's licensed cruise partner, allowing Disney characters to appear aboard its ships and enabling combined cruise, hotel, and theme park vacation packages. The partnership ended in 1993, when Premier entered a new agreement with Warner Bros. and adopted the use of Looney Tunes characters. Following the termination of the agreement, Disney explored replacing Premier with another cruise partner and entered negotiations with both Carnival and Royal Caribbean. When those discussions failed to produce an agreement, Disney began developing plans to operate its own cruise line. Meanwhile, Walt Disney Travel Company began signing agreements with other cruise operators to offer Disney hotel and resort vacation packages.

By early 1994, Disney had commissioned preliminary cruise ship designs and announced plans to launch a proprietary cruise operation by 1998. Arthur Rodney was appointed the inaugural president of the venture, initially branded as Disney Vacation Cruises. The operating company was incorporated in the United Kingdom in February 1996 as Devonson Cruise Company, Limited and later renamed Magical Cruise Company Limited.

In 1995, Disney ordered two purpose-built cruise ships from Fincantieri in Italy. Around the same time, the company acquired Gorda Cay in The Bahamas, investing approximately $25 million to redevelop the island as a private cruise destination later named Castaway Cay.

=== Launch and early operations (1998–2019) ===
The first ship, Disney Magic, entered service in July 1998, followed by Disney Wonder in December 1999. With their introduction, Disney Cruise Line officially commenced operations, homeporting both vessels at Port Canaveral under a long-term agreement with the Canaveral Port Authority.

Early itineraries focused on short Caribbean cruises marketed to families, later expanding to seven-night itineraries and Western Caribbean routes. In 1999, Matt Ouimet succeeded Arthur Rodney as president of Disney Cruise Line.

In 2005, Disney Magic was temporarily repositioned to the Port of Los Angeles in conjunction with Disneyland's 50th-anniversary celebrations, testing demand for West Coast sailings. In 2007, the ship was deployed to Europe for an extended Mediterranean season, marking Disney Cruise Line's first sustained operations outside North America.

In 2007, Disney announced plans to expand its fleet with two significantly larger vessels, the Dream class, constructed by Meyer Werft in Germany. Disney Dream entered service in 2011, followed by Disney Fantasy in 2012. The arrival of these ships enabled the seasonal redeployment of the Magic-class vessels to Europe, the West Coast, and Alaska.

=== Pandemic suspension ===
From March 2020 until July 2021, Disney Cruise Line suspended global operations due to the COVID-19 pandemic. Service resumed gradually, including a series of closed-loop sailings from ports in the United Kingdom, before returning to regular international itineraries.

=== Large-scale expansion (2020s) ===
Beginning in the 2020s, Disney Cruise Line embarked on its largest expansion to date, structured around two distinct phases of vessel acquisition.

The first phase centers on the Wish class, with five vessels ordered, starting in 2016. Disney Wish entered service in 2022, followed by Disney Treasure in 2024, and Disney Destiny in 2025. Disney Believe is scheduled for delivery in 2027, and a fifth vessel, the Disney Imagination in 2029. Unlike the other ships, the Disney Imagination will be owned and operated by Oriental Land Company, Disney's long-time partner and the owner and operator of Tokyo Disney Resort, and will be homeported in Tokyo.

In 2022, Disney also acquired a partially completed cruise ship later named Disney Adventure. Following extensive redesign and refurbishment, the vessel entered service in March 2026, homeported year-round in Singapore, marking Disney Cruise Line's first permanent deployment in Asia.

A second phase, announced in 2024, consists of three ships of a newly designed, unnamed class. These vessels, sized between the earlier Magic and Dream classes, are scheduled to enter service in 2029, 2030, and 2031.

In parallel with fleet expansion, Disney invested in port infrastructure and private destinations. In April 2022, the company announced plans to establish a secondary homeport facility at Port Everglades in Fort Lauderdale, Florida, which opened in November 2023. Port Canaveral also underwent pier and terminal upgrades to accommodate larger ships. Disney further expanded its portfolio of exclusive destinations with the development of Lookout Cay at Lighthouse Point on the island of Eleuthera in The Bahamas. Announced in March 2019, the destination opened to guests in June 2024.

Following the initial announcement, it was reported that all three cruise ships has been moved to 2029 and one cruise ship in 2030 at Disney Cruise Line.

=== Corporate organization ===
In February 2009, Karl Holz was appointed president of Disney Cruise Line and New Vacation Operations, succeeding Tom McAlpin. Following a corporate reorganization in 2018, Disney Cruise Line and related offerings were grouped under the Disney Signature Experiences segment within Disney Experiences, with Jeff Vahle named president.

In 2020, Vahle transitioned to lead Walt Disney World Resort, and Thomas Mazloum was appointed president of Disney Signature Experiences. In 2025, Mazloum became president of Disneyland Resort, and Joe Schott was named president of Disney Signature Experiences.

=== Child Sexual Exploitation Material investigation (2026) ===
In late April 2026, United States Customs and Border Protection (CPB) boarded eight cruise ships docked at the Port of San Diego as part of an ongoing Child pornography investigation. CPB Officers interviewed 28 crew members between April 23 and 27, and determined that 27 of them were involved in the receipt, possession, transportation, distribution, or viewing of CSEM or child pornography. Disney responded in a statement: "We have a zero tolerance policy for this type of behavior and fully cooperated with law enforcement. While the majority of these individuals were not from our cruise line, those who were are no longer with the company."

== Facilities ==
=== Terminals ===
==== Port Canaveral ====
Port Canaveral Terminal 8
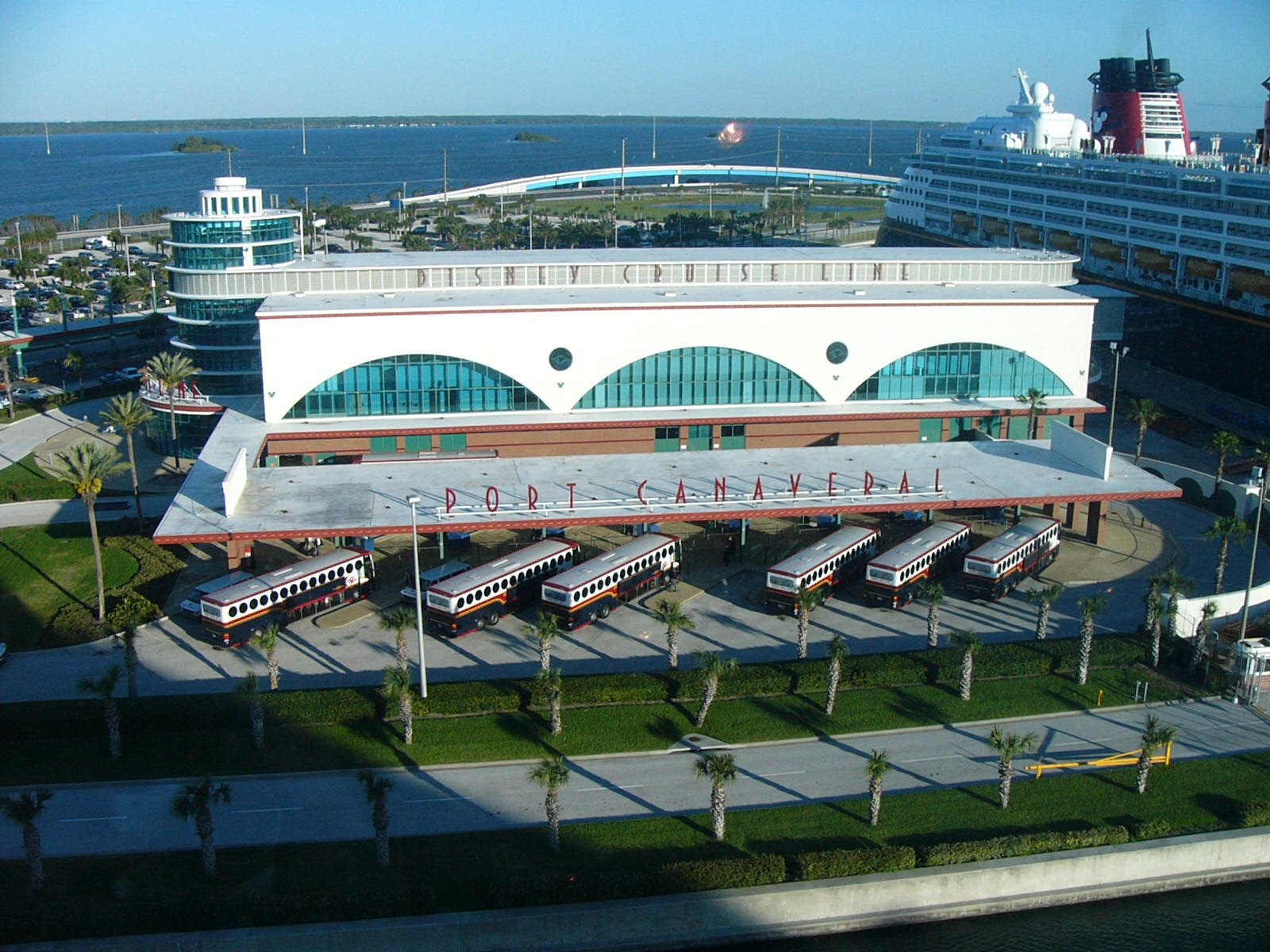
- Disney Cruise Line Terminal 8 at Port Canaveral
- Location: Port Canaveral
- Coordinates: 28°24′47″N 80°37′47″W
- Owner: Canaveral Port Authority

Characteristics
- Total length: 1,160 ft (350 m)

History
- Opening date: July 30, 1998

Port Canaveral's Cruise Terminal 8, located in Cape Canaveral, Florida, serves as the primary homeport facility for Disney Cruise Line. The line homeports Disney Fantasy, Disney Treasure, and Disney Magic at Terminal 8, while Disney Wish is homeported at nearby Cruise Terminal 10, a shared-use terminal.

The terminal building, owned by the Canaveral Port Authority and operated by Disney Cruise Line, measures 70,000 square feet (6,500 m^{2}) and includes passenger check-in, security screening, and boarding facilities, along with adjacent ground transportation infrastructure.

In 2009, Disney Cruise Line negotiated an extension of its operating agreement with Port Canaveral through 2022, which included dock and terminal upgrades to accommodate newer vessels. In 2019, the parties reached a new 20-year agreement granting Disney exclusive use of Terminal 8 and partial use of Terminal 10. In 2018, port officials approved studies to evaluate capacity upgrades at Terminal 8 and adjacent facilities in response to planned fleet growth. In January 2019, the Canaveral Port Authority approved modernization work at Terminals 8 and 10 to support additional year-round ship deployments.

==== Port Everglades ====
Port Everglades Terminal 4
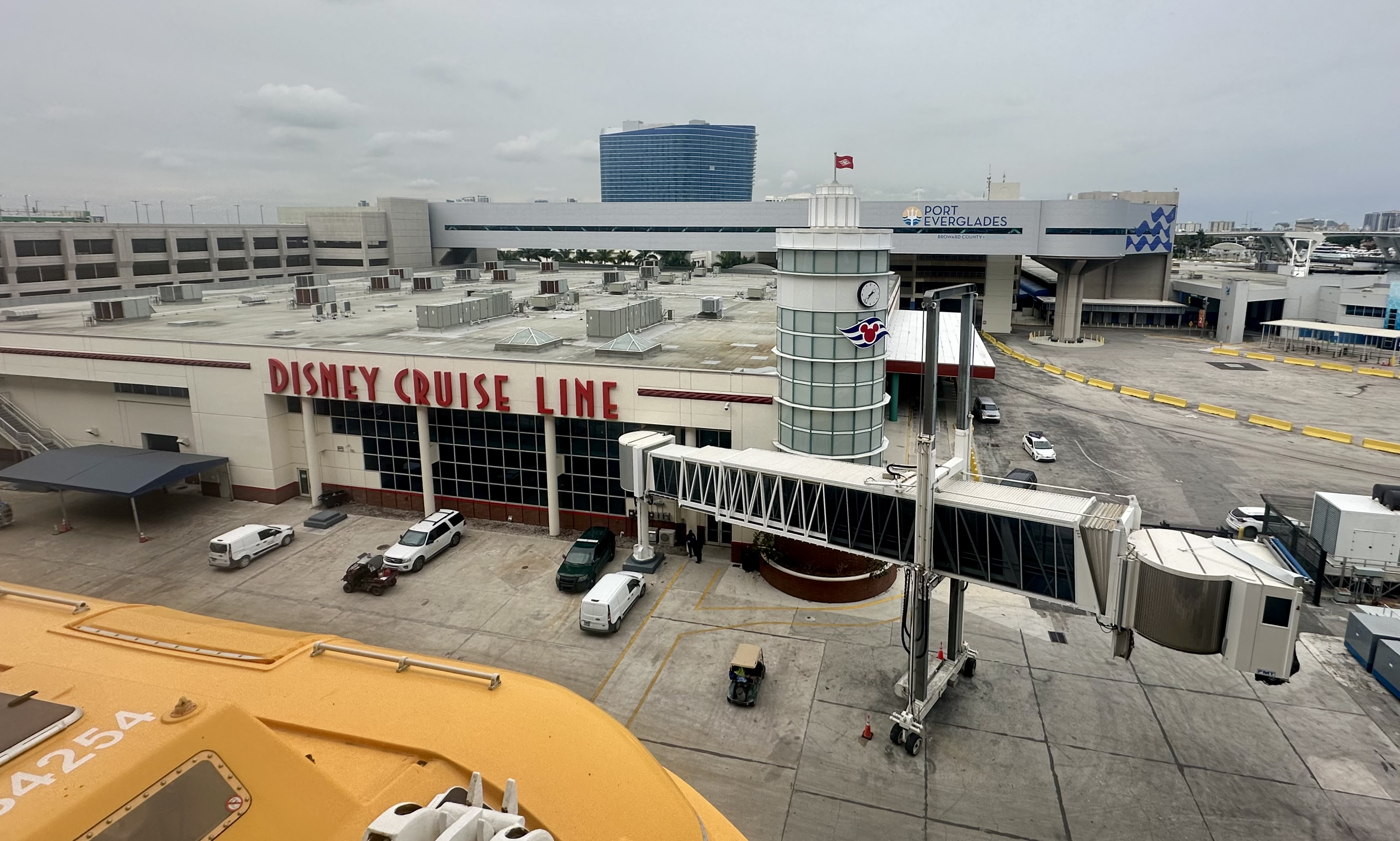
- Disney Cruise Line Terminal 4 at Port Everglades following renovation
- Location: Port Everglades
- Coordinates: 26°05′46″N 80°07′19″W
- Owner: Broward County

Characteristics
- Total length: 1,125 ft (343 m)

History
- Renovated: November 20, 2023

Port Everglades's Cruise Terminal 4, located in Fort Lauderdale, Florida, serves as a secondary homeport facility for Disney Cruise Line. The terminal is scheduled to homeport Disney Destiny, along with a second vessel on a seasonal basis.

In April 2022, the Broward County Commission approved the conversion of Cruise Terminal 4 at Port Everglades into an additional homeport for Disney Cruise Line. Passenger embarkation operations began on November 20, 2023.

Cruise Terminal 4 is owned by Broward County and operated by Disney Cruise Line. The 104,162-square-foot (9,677.0 m^{2}) facility includes passenger processing areas and is directly connected to the 1,818-space Heron Garage. Interior theming incorporates elements from the Finding Nemo franchise, and includes a public art installation, Coral Glow Persian Sconce Wall, by Dale Chihuly.

Under a long-term operating agreement, Disney Cruise Line is scheduled to base at least one vessel at Port Everglades on a year-round basis, with provisions for additional seasonal service.

=== Private destinations ===
==== Castaway Cay ====
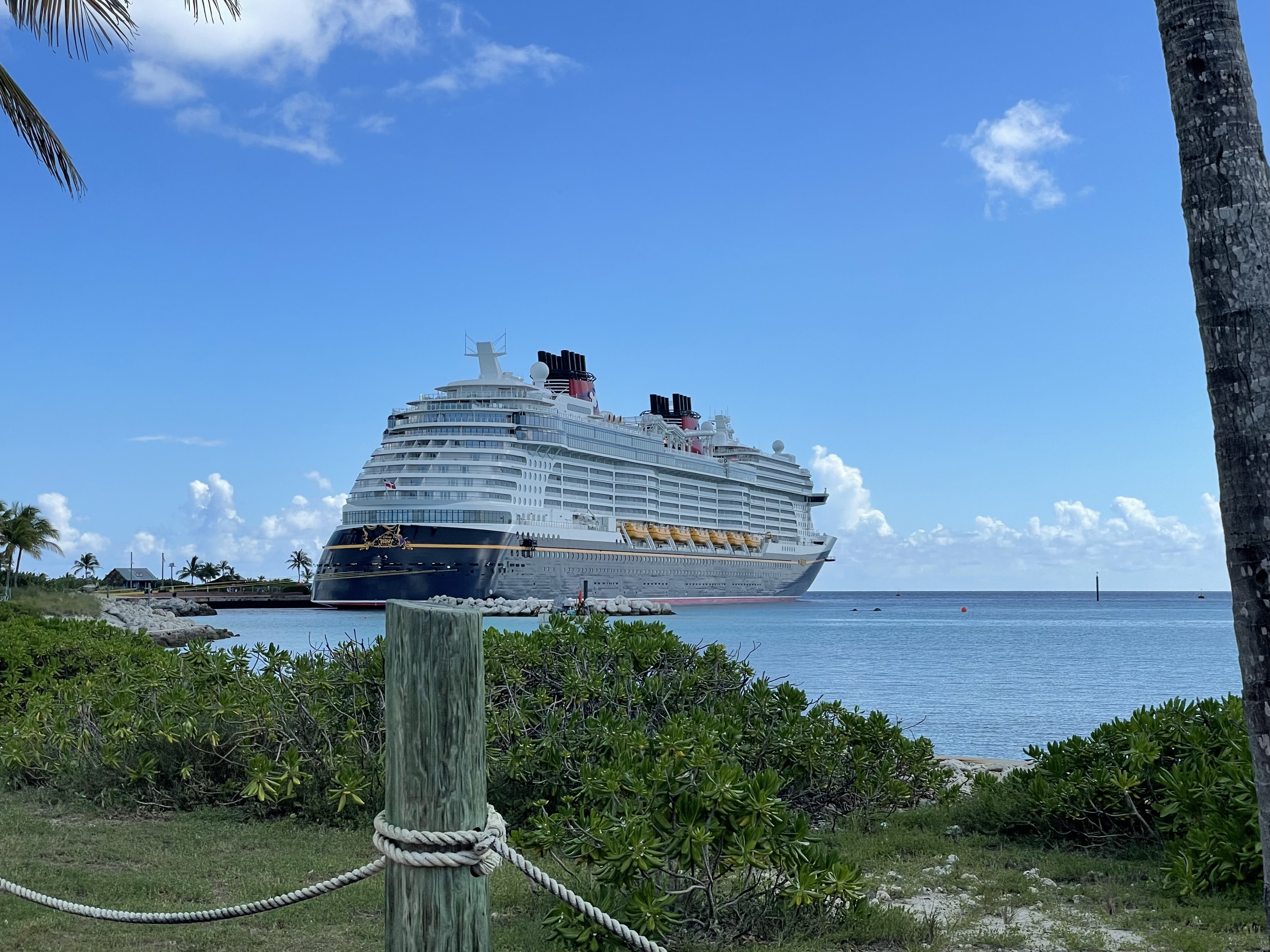
Disney Wish docked at the pier at Castaway Cay, August 2022

Disney's Castaway Cay is a private island in The Bahamas that serves as an exclusive port of call for Disney Cruise Line ships. It is located near Great Abaco Island and was formerly known as Gorda Cay. In 1997, The Walt Disney Company acquired a 99-year land lease from the Bahamian government, extending through 2096.

Castaway Cay was the first private island destination in the cruise industry designed to allow ships to dock directly at the island, eliminating the need for passengers to be tendered ashore.

The island remains largely undeveloped, with approximately 55 acres (22 ha) of its roughly 1,000 acres (400 ha) in active use. Daily operations are supported by approximately 140 permanent Disney Cruise Line employees based on the island.

==== Lookout Cay at Lighthouse Point ====
Disney's Lookout Cay at Lighthouse Point is a privately owned cruise destination in The Bahamas that serves as an exclusive port of call for Disney Cruise Line ships. It is located on Lighthouse Point, a peninsula on the southeastern coast of Eleuthera near Bannerman Town. Like Castaway Cay, Lookout Cay was developed exclusively for Disney Cruise Line operations and is accessed solely by Disney vessels. Unlike Castaway Cay, which is situated on a private island, Lookout Cay occupies a privately controlled peninsula that remains part of the larger, inhabited island of Eleuthera.

In March 2019, The Walt Disney Company purchased the Lighthouse Point property from the Bahamian government. The destination opened to guests on June 6, 2024, with the Disney Magic becoming the first Disney Cruise Line vessel to call at the port.

== Market share ==
The cruise line has grown over the past several years, as shown below.

| Year | Market share | | Ref. |
| Year | By revenue | By no. of passengers | Ref. |
|---|---|---|---|
| 2011 | 1.95% | 1.95% | |
| 2015 | 2.4% | 2.8% | |
| 2018 | 2.2% | 2.3% | |
| 2021 | 2.7% | 2.2% | |
| 2024 | 4.2% | 2.8% | |
| 2025 | 3.9% | 3.1% | |

== Fleet ==
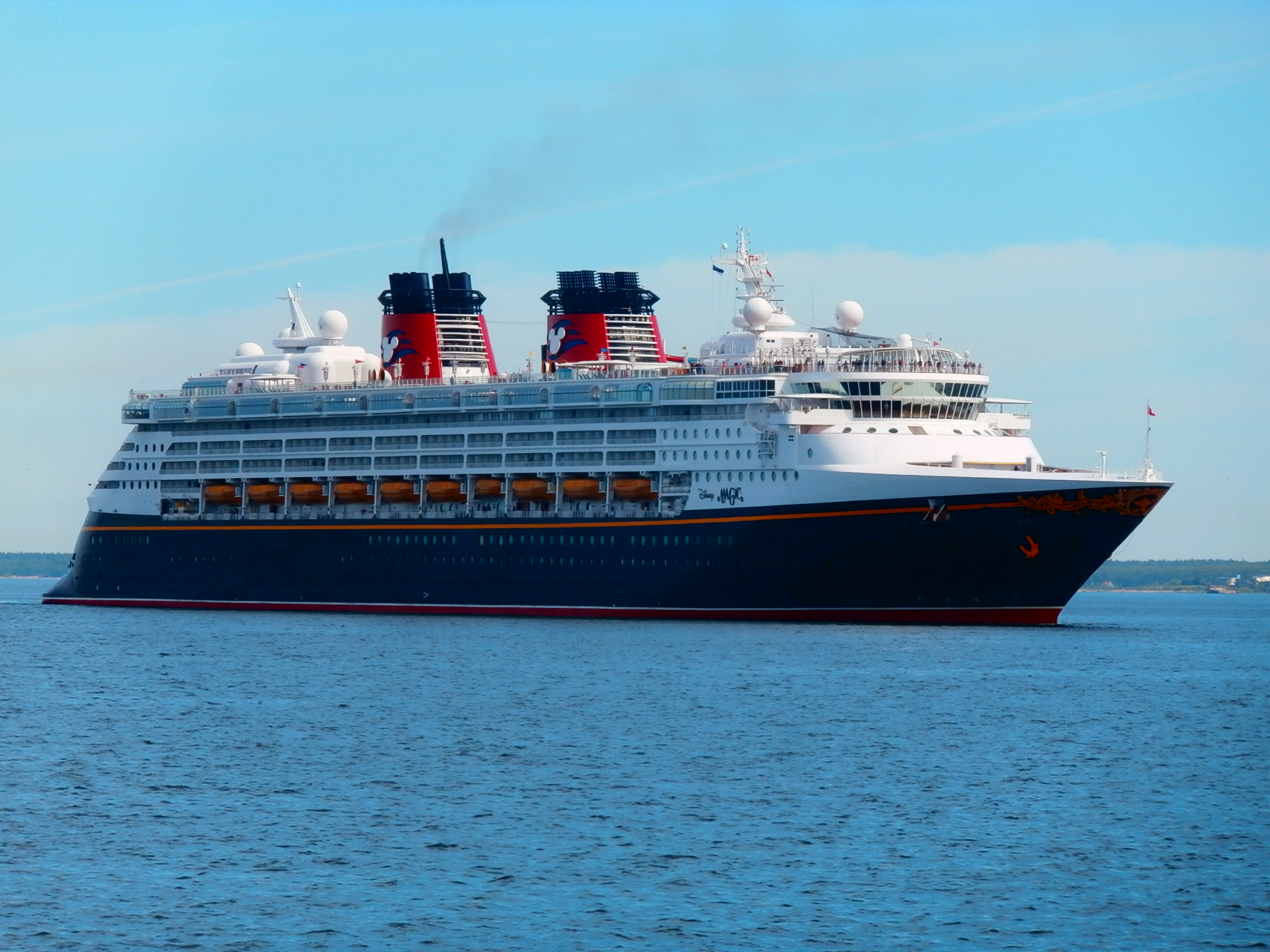
Disney Magic, the first vessel in the fleet, sailing along Tallinn Bay in 2017

Disney Cruise Line vessels incorporate stylistic references to ocean liners of the early 20th century, including long, low profiles and black hulls with red accents, which also reflect the colors associated with Mickey Mouse. The vessels carry yellow lifeboats that match the color of Mickey's shoes rather than the standard safety orange, a choice that required a waiver under international maritime regulations.

Disney Cruise Line began operations with the Disney Magic (1998) and Disney Wonder (1999), built by Fincantieri in Italy. The fleet later expanded with the Dream-class ships, Disney Dream (2011) and Disney Fantasy (2012), constructed by Meyer Werft in Germany. Expansion continued in the 2020s with the Wish-class, beginning with Disney Wish (2022), followed by Disney Treasure (2024) and Disney Destiny (2025). The Disney Adventure (2026) is the only Global-class vessel in the fleet.

Two additional Wish-class ships are on order. The first, Disney Believe, is scheduled to enter service in 2027. The second, Disney Imagination, is scheduled to enter service in 2029 and will be owned and operated by the Oriental Land Company, the operator of Tokyo Disney Resort, under the name Disney Cruise Line Japan. The Oriental Land Company holds an option for an additional ship.

Three additional ships to be built at Meyer Werft, smaller than the Dream-class but larger than the Magic-class, was originally planned to enter service between 2029 and 2031, but later changed to 2029 and 2030.

All vessels are registered in Nassau, Bahamas, with the exception of the Disney Imagination, which will instead be registered in Tokyo.

Most ships operate on low-sulfur marine gas oil blended with hydrotreated vegetable oil. Wish-class vessels use liquefied natural gas. Disney Adventure was designed to operate on methanol fuel, but this was not available in Singapore at the time it entered service; the vessel instead operates on lower-emission fuels, including hydrotreated vegetable oil.

=== Current fleet ===
| Ship | Class | Gross tonnage | Capacity | Cabins | Entered service | Shipyard | Image |
|---|---|---|---|---|---|---|---|
| Disney Magic | Magic | 83,969 GT | 2,700 | 875 | July 30, 1998 | Fincantieri | |
| Disney Wonder | Magic | 84,130 GT | 2,700 | 875 | August 15, 1999 | Fincantieri | |
| Disney Dream | Dream | 129,690 GT | 4,000 | 1,251 | January 26, 2011 | Meyer Werft | |
| Disney Fantasy | Dream | 129,690 GT | 4,000 | 1,251 | March 31, 2012 | Meyer Werft | |
| Disney Wish | Wish | 144,256 GT | 4,000 | 1,254 | June 29, 2022 | Meyer Werft | |
| Disney Treasure | Wish | 144,256 GT | 4,000 | 1,256 | December 21, 2024 | Meyer Werft | |
| Disney Destiny | Wish | 144,256 GT | 4,000 | 1,256 | November 20, 2025 | Meyer Werft | |
| Disney Adventure | Global | 208,108 GT | 6,700 | 1,954 | March 10, 2026 | MV Werften / Meyer Wismar (Note: Construction started by MV Werften. After the company's bankruptcy, construction was completed under the supervision of Meyer Werft.) | |

=== Future fleet ===
| Ship | Class | Capacity | Cabins | Planned service | Shipyard | Gross tonnage |
|---|---|---|---|---|---|---|
| Disney Believe | Wish | 4,000 | 1,250 | December 18, 2027 | Meyer Werft | 144,000 GT |
| Disney Imagination | Wish | 4,000 | 1,250 | 2029 | Meyer Werft | 144,000 GT |
| Disney Journey | TBA | 3,000 | TBA | 2029 | Meyer Werft | 105,000 GT |
| TBA | TBA | 3,000 | TBA | 2029 | Meyer Werft | 105,000 GT |
| TBA | TBA | 3,000 | TBA | 2030 | Meyer Werft | 105,000 GT |
