= Disney Treasure =

Cruise ship operated by Disney Cruise Line

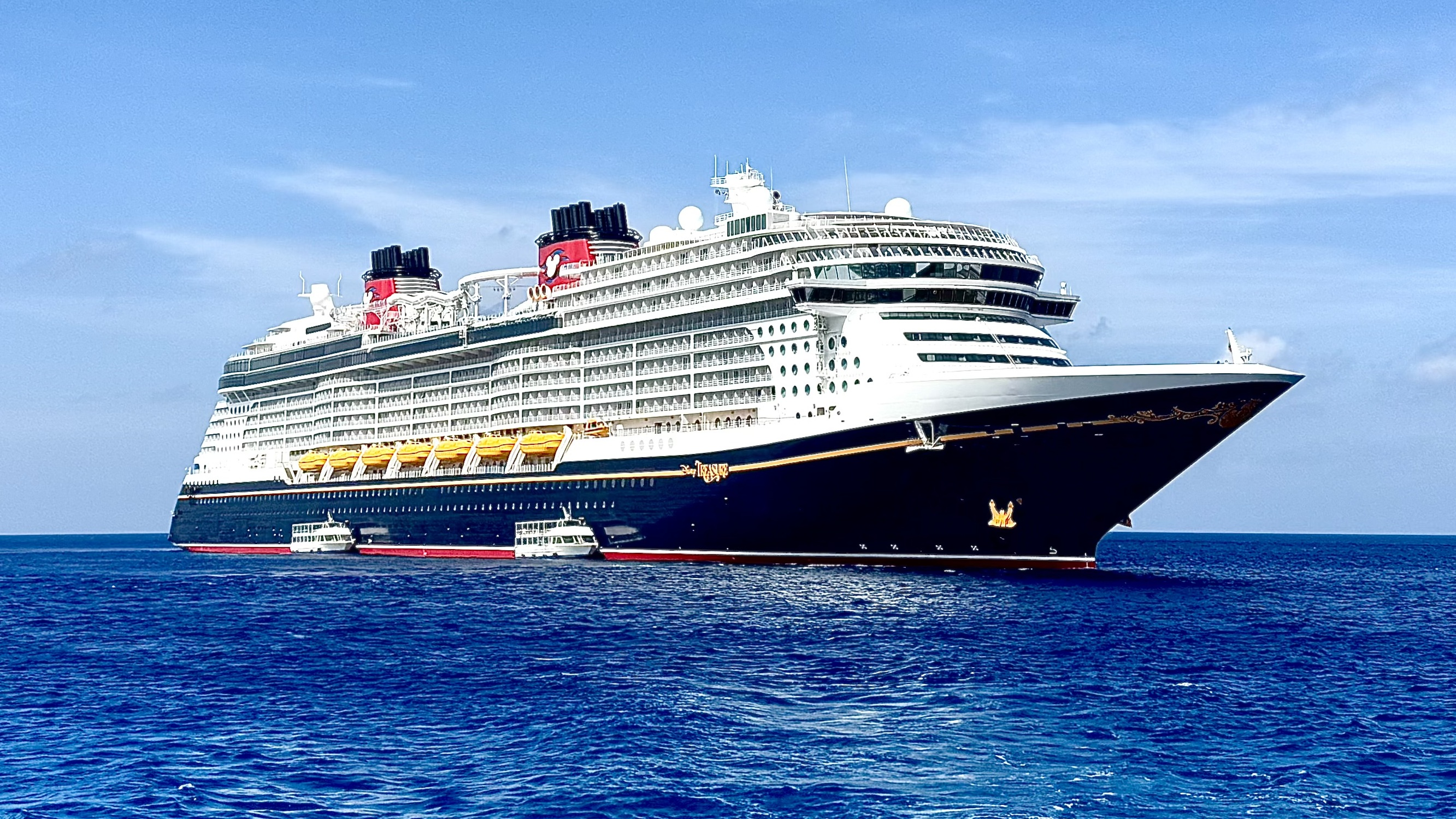
- Disney Treasure in 2025

History

Bahamas
- Name: Disney Treasure
- Owner: The Walt Disney Company
- Operator: Disney Cruise Line
- Port of registry: Nassau, Bahamas
- Ordered: March 3, 2016
- Builder: Meyer Werft (Papenburg, Germany)
- Cost: US$1.1 billion
- Yard number: S. 718
- Laid down: March 30, 2023
- Launched: August 3, 2024
- Sponsored by: The Walt Disney Company cast, crew, Imagineers and employees around the world
- Christened: November 19, 2024 in New York, U.S.
- Completed: October 24, 2024
- Maiden voyage: December 21, 2024
- In service: 2024–present
- Identification: IMO number: 9834753; MMSI number: 311001221; Call sign: C6GE2
- Status: In service

General characteristics
- Class & type: Wish-class cruise ship
- Tonnage: 144,256 GT
- Length: 341.8 m (1,121.4 ft)
- Beam: 39 m (128.0 ft)
- Height: 67 m (219.8 ft)
- Draft: 8.6 m (28.2 ft)
- Decks: 15
- Installed power: 5 × 12-cylinder MAN 51/60DF LNG engines
- Propulsion: 2 × 19.5 MW (26,100 hp) ABB Azipod azimuth thrusters; 4 × Wärtsilä bow thrusters
- Speed: Service: 19.5 kn (36.1 km/h; 22.4 mph); Maximum: 23 kn (43 km/h; 26 mph)
- Capacity: 2,492 passengers (double occupancy); 4,000 passengers (maximum)
- Crew: 1,555
- Notes: Bow character: Voyager Minnie; Atrium characters: Aladdin, Jasmine, and the Magic Carpet; Stern characters: Peter Pan and Captain Hook

Disney Treasure is a cruise ship owned and operated by Disney Cruise Line, a subsidiary of the Walt Disney Company. She is the sixth ship in the Disney Cruise Line fleet and the second vessel of the Wish class, following Disney Wish (2022).

The first two ships of the Wish class were ordered on March 3, 2016, and built by Meyer Werft at its shipyard in Papenburg, Germany. Construction of the Disney Treasure began with the keel laying on March 30, 2023, and the ship was launched on August 3, 2024. She was completed on October 24, 2024, christened on November 19, 2024, in New York City, and entered service with her maiden voyage on December 21, 2024.

As a member of the Wish class, Disney Treasure is slightly larger than the preceding Dream class, with a gross tonnage of approximately 144,000, compared with about 130,000 for Dream-class ships, while retaining the same number of guest cabins. During development, the class was known internally as the Triton class. The class marked several firsts for Disney Cruise Line, including the adoption of liquefied natural gas (LNG) as a lower-emission fuel and the use of azimuthing podded propulsion (Azipod).

== History ==
In March 2016, Disney Cruise Line announced that it had commissioned two new ships, described as larger than Dream-class but with a similar number of staterooms. A third ship of the class, later named Disney Treasure, was announced on July 15, 2017, at the D23 Expo. Delivery was initially planned for 2022 but was postponed to 2024 in 2020.

In March 2018, Disney Cruise Line released a rendering of the new class. The 140,000-ton vessels were designed to be powered by LNG and to accommodate at least 2,500 passengers. In January 2019, public documents published by Port Canaveral referred to the class as Triton. The class was later named after its lead ship, Disney Wish, which was delivered in June 2022.

On September 11, 2022, Disney Cruise Line confirmed the name Disney Treasure at the D23 Expo. Company materials described the ship's design as themed around adventure, with a Grand Hall drawing on architectural motifs associated with Asia and Africa, as well as the fictional city of Agrabah.

The first section of the ship arrived at Meyer Werft on November 27, 2022. The floating engine room unit, measuring 140 by 39 metres (459 ft × 128 ft) and housing MAN 12V 51/60DF engines and LNG tanks, was constructed at Neptun Werft in Rostock and later transferred to Meyer Werft. The keel laying took place on March 30, 2023. The hull was completed in December 2023.

The ship was floated out in March 2024 and departed the shipyard in September for Eemshaven, where it arrived on September 19. It subsequently underwent sea trials in the Skagerrak.

The ship was delivered on October 24, 2024, in Eemshaven. During its delivery voyage to North America, it assisted a family of four whose sailboat was taking on water approximately 80 miles (130 km) off Bermuda; all four were brought aboard safely.

The christening took place on November 19, 2024, in New York City. The maiden voyage departed on December 21, 2024, from Port Canaveral, Florida, operating seven-night itineraries in the eastern and western Caribbean.

== Design ==
The ship has a gross tonnage of 144,256 with 1,250 staterooms.

On September 5, 2023, Disney Cruise Line shared a first look at their newest ship, Disney Treasure, which embarked on December 21, 2024. Disney Treasure, similar to Disney Wish, would have several restaurants, immersive spaces and experiences themed to various Disney characters and properties, including Walt Disney Pictures, Marvel Cinematic Universe, Star Wars, and Pixar. The ship features a Coco-themed restaurant, a Tomorrow Tower Suite inspired by EPCOT and a Jungle Cruise-inspired lounge.

In October 2023, Disney announced that the ship would also feature a bar themed after its attraction The Haunted Mansion, a first in the cruise line's history.

== Recreation ==
=== On-board activities ===
The ship features a water coaster at sea, called the AquaMouse, which is similar to Disney Wish's version of the water coaster, but it includes a brand-new Mickey and Minnie Mouse short called Curse of the Golden Egg, which includes immersive show scenes, special effects and incredible ocean views, as riders travel through a mysterious ancient temple in search of legendary treasure.

=== Entertainment ===
Disney Treasure includes three theatres:

- Walt Disney Theatre (1,274 seats; live original productions: The Tale of Moana, Beauty and the Beast and Disney Seas the Adventure)
- Wonderland Cinema (84 capacity; screens motion pictures)
- Never Land Cinema (86 capacity; screens motion pictures)

=== Rotational dining ===
Every night of a Disney Treasure cruise, guests dine at a different restaurant through a system called "rotational dining." Their servers rotate with them, allowing diners and wait staff to get to know one another throughout the cruise.

The rotational dining restaurants on Disney Treasure are 1923, located on deck 3 aft; Worlds of Marvel, located on deck 4 aft; and Plaza de Coco, located on deck 5 aft. As well as rotational dining, the Disney Treasure also has two specialty restaurants: Palo Steakhouse and Enchanté, which incur an additional cost and are exclusively for adults. These restaurants are located on deck 12 towards the rear of the ship.
