= Karl Holz (executive) =

Karl L. Holz
- Born: Karl L. Holz; Hinzweiler, Germany
- Education: State University of New York at Fredonia
- Occupation: Executive
- Employer: Walt Disney Parks and Resorts
- Term: 2009 - 2018

Karl L. Holz is a former executive for Walt Disney Parks and Resorts.

Karl Holz was President and CEO of Concession Air. Then he was a Knott's Berry Farm Vice President of theme park operations when he was hired into Disney in 1996. Holz was at one point senior vice president, Walt Disney World Operations. Appointed in 2003, he served as Disney Cruise Line president until his appointed as president of Euro Disney in September 2004. In May 2005, Holz took over as CEO at Euro Disney.

Holz became president of New Vacation Operations of Disney Parks & Resorts reporting to Al Weiss, president of worldwide operations for Walt Disney Parks and Resorts by April 2008. In February 2009, Holz returned to the presidency of Disney Cruise Line in addition to his continuing as head of New Vacation Operations, which was primarily Adventures by Disney. As an extension of the "One Disney" initiative and the resignation of Weiss, Disney Vacation Club was added to his New Vacation Operations responsibilities while he joined Disney Parks and Resorts executive committee in July 2011. On October 1, 2017, Anthony Connelly became the President of New Vacation Operations and Disney Cruise Line for Walt Disney Parks and Resorts.

Holz retired on February 15, 2018.
