= Hi-Diddle-Dee-Dee =

Song by Walter Catlett
- Published: 1940
- Length: 1:40
- Composer: Leigh Harline
- Lyricist: Ned Washington

"Hi-Diddle-Dee-Dee", also known as An Actor's Life for Me, is a song from Walt Disney's animated film Pinocchio sung by Walter Catlett.

The music is by Leigh Harline, and the lyrics are by Ned Washington and Oliver Wallace. The song is sung by the film's antagonist, John Worthington "Honest John" Foulfellow, when he takes Pinocchio to Stromboli. A reprise of the song is sung when he takes Pinocchio to Pleasure Island. The reprise in the soundtrack version on the disc contains none of the vocals as presented on the record and in the film. It was the first Disney villain song. It also appears in Disney's 2022 live-action remake of the film, in which it was sung by Keegan-Michael Key as Honest John.
