= Disney Dream =

Cruise ship operated by Disney Cruise Line

Coordinates: 28.4100°N 80.6100°W

- Disney Dream in 2023

History

Bahamas
- Name: Disney Dream
- Owner: The Walt Disney Company
- Operator: Disney Cruise Line
- Port of registry: Nassau, Bahamas
- Ordered: February 22, 2007
- Builder: Meyer Werft (Papenburg, Germany)
- Cost: US$900 million (equivalent to $1.3 billion in 2025)
- Yard number: S. 687
- Laid down: August 26, 2009
- Launched: October 30, 2010
- Sponsored by: Jennifer Hudson
- Christened: January 19, 2011
- Completed: December 8, 2010
- Maiden voyage: January 26, 2011
- In service: 2011–present
- Identification: IMO number: 9434254; MMSI number: 311042900; Call sign: C6YR6
- Status: In service

General characteristics
- Class & type: Dream-class cruise ship
- Tonnage: 129,690 GT; 12,915 DWT; 104,345 NT
- Displacement: 65,298 t (143,957,000 lb)
- Length: 339.8 m (1,114.8 ft)
- Beam: Breadth: 37 m (121.4 ft) at water line; Maximum: 41.8 m (137.1 ft) at bridge wings
- Height: 66.13 m (217 ft)
- Draft: 8.6 m (28.2 ft) at load line
- Decks: 18 (14 passenger)
- Installed power: 3 × 12-cylinder MAN diesel engines turning Converteam generators producing 14.4 MW (19,300 hp); 2 × 14-cylinder MAN diesel engines turning Converteam generators producing 16.8 MW (22,500 hp)
- Propulsion: 2 × 23 MW (31,000 hp) Converteam motors turning 5-blade inward-turning fixed-pitch propellers; 3 × 3,000 kW (4,000 hp) Wärtsilä bow thrusters; 2 × 3,000 kW (4,000 hp) Wärtsilä stern thrusters
- Speed: Service: 22 kn (41 km/h; 25 mph); Maximum: 23.5 kn (43.5 km/h; 27.0 mph)
- Capacity: 2,500 passengers (double occupancy); 4,000 passengers (maximum)
- Crew: 1,458
- Notes: Bow character: Captain Mickey; Atrium character: Admiral Donald; Stern characters: Sorcerer Mickey and Brooms

Disney Dream is a cruise ship owned and operated by Disney Cruise Line, a subsidiary of the Walt Disney Company. She is the third ship in the Disney Cruise Line fleet and the lead vessel of the Dream class. The ship was followed by her sister ship, Disney Fantasy (2012).

The Dream class was ordered on February 22, 2007, and built by Meyer Werft at its shipyard in Papenburg, Germany. Construction of the vessel began with the keel laying on August 26, 2009, and the ship was launched on October 30, 2010. She was completed on December 8, 2010, christened on January 19, 2011, and entered service with her maiden voyage on January 26, 2011. The ship reportedly cost approximately US$900 million (equivalent to $1.329 billion in 2025).

The Dream class marked a significant increase in size over Disney Cruise Line's preceding Magic class. Dream-class ships have a gross tonnage of approximately 130,000, compared with about 84,000 for the Magic class, which had been introduced 12 years earlier.

== History and construction ==
In February 2007, Disney Cruise Line announced plans to commission two new ships. Steel cutting for the Disney Dream began in March 2009 at the Meyer Werft shipyard in Papenburg, Germany. Later that month, the two ships were officially named, with Disney Dream scheduled to enter service before Disney Fantasy. The ship's design was unveiled at a press conference in New York City on October 29, 2009.

The keel of Disney Dream was laid on August 19, 2009. The final section, the bow, was installed on June 1, 2010, completing the exterior while interior work continued. Float-out occurred on October 30, 2010, and the ship left the shipyard in November 2010. Disney Cruise Line took possession on December 8, 2010. She arrived at Port Canaveral on January 4, 2011, and was christened on January 19, 2011, by Jennifer Hudson, who had begun her entertainment career on Disney Wonder. Disney Dream's maiden voyage commenced on January 26, 2011, with calls at Nassau and Disney's private island, Castaway Cay.

Since her launch, Disney Dream has primarily operated three- and four-night itineraries to The Bahamas, with European itineraries announced for summer 2023, including the United Kingdom, France, Spain, Norway, Denmark, Greece and Italy. On June 7, 2022, the ship temporarily relocated to Miami. On November 20, 2023, she moved to her current home port at Port Everglades Cruise Terminal 4.

== Design ==
Disney Dream is approximately 40% larger than the first two ships in the Disney Cruise Line fleet, Disney Magic and Disney Wonder, with a gross tonnage of 129,690 GT, a length of 339.8 metres (1,115 ft), and a beam of 37 metres (121.4 ft). She has 1,250 staterooms, a passenger capacity of 2,500 at double occupancy (maximum 4,000), and a crew of 1,458.

The ship has 14 decks, a black hull, white superstructure, twin red funnels, and yellow lifeboats. The interior combines Art Deco design with Disney-themed elements. Interior cabins feature "virtual portholes" that display exterior views with animated Disney characters.

The atrium features an Art Deco-style chandelier crafted in Brixen, Northern Italy, measuring 22 feet (6.7 m) in diameter and extending 13 feet (4.0 m) from the ceiling, with 88,680 Swarovski crystal beads and 24kt gold plating. A statue of Donald Duck as an admiral is located in the atrium lobby, continuing the Disney Cruise Line tradition of featuring classic Disney characters in this space.

== On-board facilities ==
=== Activities ===
The ship offers a variety of recreational facilities, including a nine-hole mini-golf course, walking track, digital sports simulators, and a convertible full-sized basketball court. Additional sports courts and play areas are available for younger children.

The AquaDuck is a 765-foot (233 m) water slide spanning four decks, passing through the ship's forward funnel and extending 20 feet (6.1 m) 20 feet (6.1 m) off the side of the ship. Pools and hot tubs are distributed throughout the ship, some with glass floors.

=== Youth facilities ===
The ship features several youth facilities: the "it's a small world" nursery (ages 6 months to 3 years), Oceaneer Club and Lab (kids 4–10), Edge (tweens 11–14), and Vibe (teens 14–17).

=== Entertainment ===
Disney Dream also includes two theaters:

- Walt Disney Theater: 1,340 seats; hosts live original productions such as Beauty and the Beast and The Golden Mickeys.
- Buena Vista Theater: 399 seats; screens motion pictures.

The Walt Disney Theater incorporates motion-tracking technology to blend performers' movements with projected digital effects.

=== Dining ===
Disney Dream employs a rotational dining system in which guests dine at a different restaurant each evening. The main dining venues include Enchanted Garden (deck 2, midship), which serves French-inspired cuisine in a setting themed to Disney fairy-tale films; Royal Palace (deck 3, midship), designed to resemble a French conservatory with lighting that transitions from daylight to sunset and night during the meal; and Animator's Palate (deck 3, aft), a venue featured across Disney Cruise Line ships that incorporates the Turtle Talk with Crush interactive show.

Adults-only specialty restaurants include Palo, serving Northern Italian cuisine, and Remy, offering French cuisine; both are located on deck 12 at the rear of the ship and require an additional fee.
