= Castaway Cay =

Private island in the Bahamas

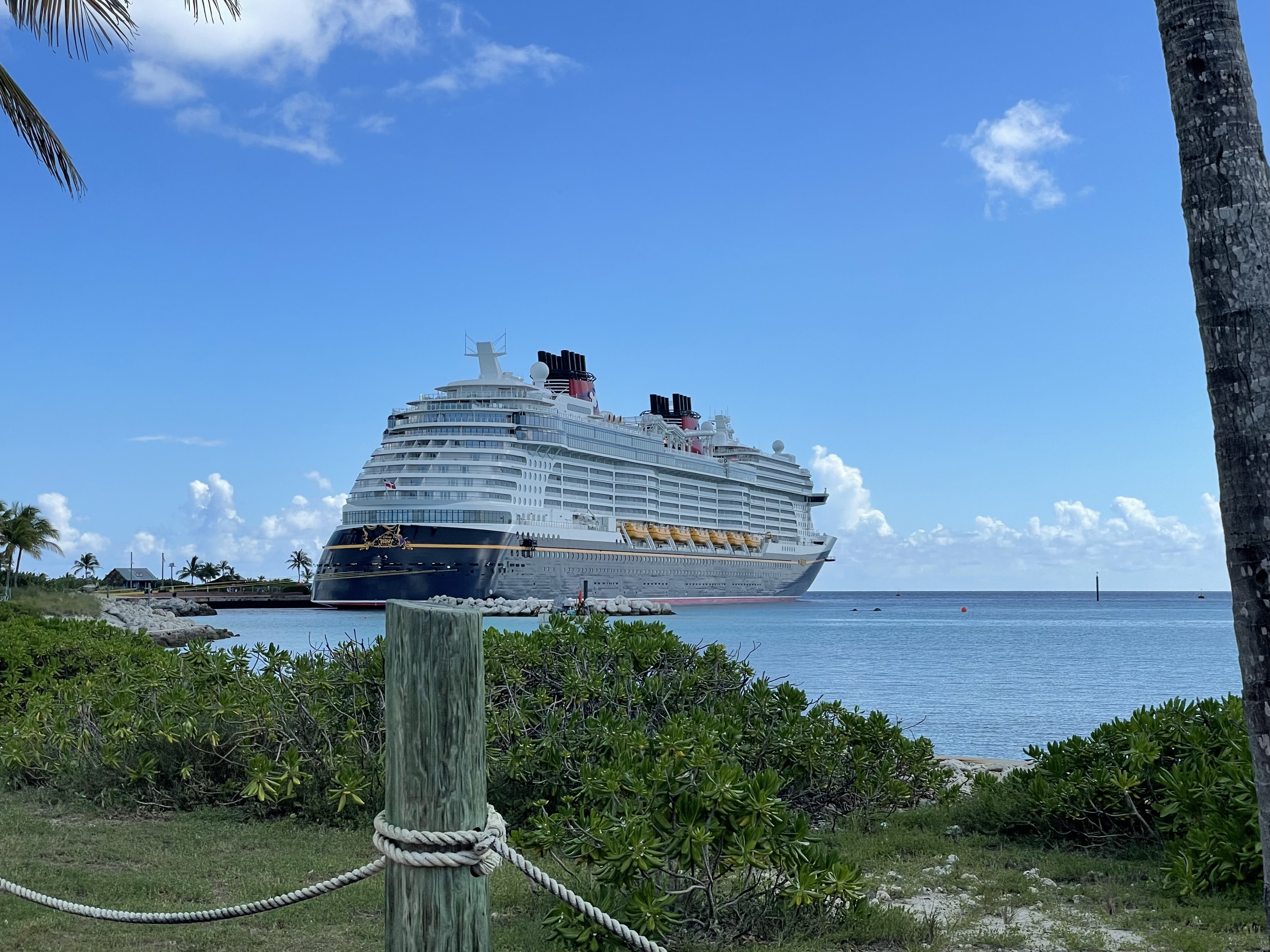
- Disney Wish docked at the pier at Castaway Cay, August 2022

- Location in the Bahamas Location in the Caribbean

Geography
- Location: The Bahamas
- Type: Cay
- Archipelago: Lucayan
- Adjacent to: Atlantic Ocean
- Area: 1,000 acres (400 ha)

Administration
- Bahamas
- District: South Abaco

Demographics
- Population: 140

Additional information
- Time zone: EST (UTC-5)
  - Summer (DST): EDT (UTC-4)
- Official website: disneycruise.disney.go.com/ports/castaway-cay

Disney's Castaway Cay (/ˈkiː/) is a private island in the Bahamas which serves as an exclusive port for the Disney Cruise Line ships (with the exception of the Disney Adventure). It is located near Great Abaco Island and was formerly known as Gorda Cay. In 1997, The Walt Disney Company purchased a 99-year land lease (through 2096) for the cay from the Bahamian government, giving the company substantial control over the island.

Castaway Cay was the first private island in the cruise industry where the ship docks on the island, eliminating the need for guests to be tendered to land.

The island is still largely undeveloped as only 55 of the 1,000 acres (4.0 km^{2}) are being used. Castaway Cay has approximately 140 Disney Cruise Line permanent residents who keep the island running daily.

== History ==
=== Gorda Cay ===
In 1654 the Spanish Galleon Jesus María de la Médica Concepción, also known as El Capitan - as it was the lead vessel in the fleet, sank off the coast of Ecuador. The ship was hauling 3 million pesos of silver, 2,212 ingots, 216 chests of coins, and 22 boxes of wrought silver. Silver salvaged from the ship by the Spanish was taken to Cuba and loaded upon the Nuestra Senora del la Maravilla, but it too sank on January 4, 1656. The silver was salvaged again, and loaded upon the Madama do Brasil, which then sank near Gorda Cay in 1657.

Gorda Cay was first settled in 1783. In 1844, the Pantheon encountered gale force winds causing it to lose its sails, and for a fire to break out. The ship ran ashore near Gorda Cay, and burnt to the waterline. The crew were rescued by the Water Witch. In 1846, the Brig Monument of Portland was sailing to Matanzas, carrying a cargo of boards, shooks, and fish, when it "was totally wrecked on Gorda Cay." The cargo and materials were recovered, taken to Charleston, South Carolina and sold.

In 1884, the ship George B. Douglass was sailing from Roatán for Nassau, when it was caught in a heavy storm and developed a leak. Captain Anderson and his crew escaped in lifeboat. "Shortly after they had pushed away from the schooner she gave a lurch to one side and then disappeared." The crew were drifting off Gorda Cay when they were found by the schooner Isle of June and towed to Nassau.

On August 12, 1928, the SS Munamar owned by Munson Steamship Line, ran aground on Gorda Cay and was unable to free itself. The passengers were removed Monday, August 13, by the tug boat Lady Cordeaux. Monday, August 20, it was reported the ship was successfully refloated.

Gorda's airstrip (now Castaway Cay Airport) was once used as a stop in the 1930s for bootleggers and later, drug runners.

In 1934, reports started circulating of ancient gold coins and earthen jars being found on the island. Otis Barton conducted dives around the island investigating claims of sunken treasure, but turned up nothing. In 1950, two men, Roscoe Thompson and Howard Lightbourne, uncovered a 72-pound silver bar with a casting mark of 1652, from the seafloor near Gorda Cay. News of the discovery was withheld until after it could be authenticated. The silver bar was sold by the men to Albert E. Worswick, who then donated it to the Bahamas Development Board, where it was then displayed at the tourist information center.

Author John Alden Knight notably visited the island in August 1953 to catch bonefish.

In October 1953, it was heavily reported that author Harry E. Rieseberg discovered the wreck of El Capitan, off the coast of Gorda Cay. In actuality, it was the Madama do Brasil that had been hauling the recovered treasure of El Capitan. Rieseberg published his book, The Sea of Treasures, based on his work recovering artifacts from the wreck. Roscoe Thompson and Howard Lightbourne, doubting the publicity behind Rieseberg's discovery, returned to Gorda Cay in 1956 to continue their search for the lost treasure of Madama do Brasil.

In 1954, Gorda Cay was promoted as an island to visit for good fishing opportunities. Afterwards, a fishing competition was held around the island in 1956.

In 1958, a film entitled Treasure of Gorda Cay entered production, with a story written by John Steinbeck, The brain child of producer Kevin McClory, it was to star Burgess Meredith. Juano Hernandez scouted additional filming locations in North Carolina. McClory was unable to raise the funds for the film, and it never came to fruition.

On November 11, 1961, Captain Julian Harvey of the Bluebelle, took the ship's guests, the Duperrault family, to visit Gorda Cay. Notoriously, on November 12, he would commit mass murder, with only the family's 11-year old Terry managing to survive.

Gorda Cay had also been used for filming. The beach where Tom Hanks first encounters Daryl Hannah in Splash is on the island, and parts of the film Pirates of the Caribbean: The Curse of the Black Pearl were filmed on the cay as well.

=== Castaway Cay ===
In 1997, the Disney Cruise Line purchased a 99-year lease for Gorda Cay from the Bahamian government and renamed it Castaway Cay, intending for it to be the line's private island. The company spent $25 million over 18 months of construction. This included dredging 50,000 truckloads of sand from the Atlantic Ocean. The pier and its approaches (a 1,700 foot channel) were constructed to allow Disney ships to dock directly alongside the island, thus removing the need for tenders to get the passengers ashore.

A race, Castaway Cay Challenge, was added to the Walt Disney World Marathon weekend series in 2015 with the 5K race taking place on Castaway Cay.

== Facilities ==
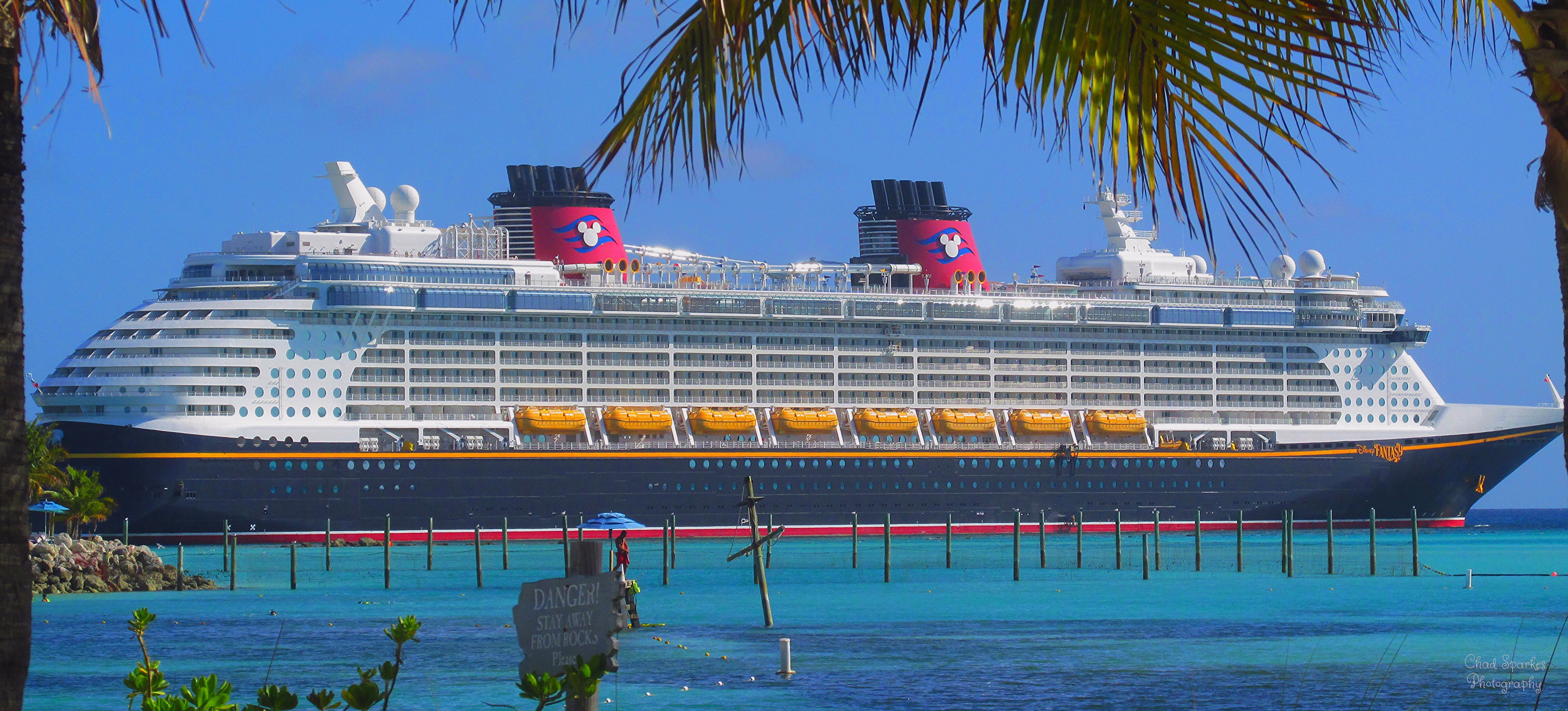
Disney Fantasy docked at Castaway Cay.

A post office on the island has special Bahamian postage and postmark specific to Disney Cruise Line. The island is developed in the theme of a castaway community with buildings made to look as if they had been improvised after a shipwreck. The facilities are maintained like any other Disney theme park; the shops accept guests' stateroom keys for payment. Food service is operated as an extension of the cruise package. A variety of activities are available to guests including bicycle rentals, personal watercraft rentals, massages overlooking the ocean, snorkeling, parasailing, volleyball, and basketball. There are monkey bars and a rope for children to climb across set about 30 metres (98 ft) into the ocean on one beach and a slide about 25 metres (82 ft) into the ocean on another beach. There are three beaches for guests: one exclusively for families, one exclusively for cabana guests, and another exclusively for adults, called Serenity Bay.

Two submarine-ride vehicles from the now-closed 20,000 Leagues Under the Sea: Submarine Voyage ride at Walt Disney World lie underwater in the snorkeling area. The Flying Dutchman pirate ship, from the Pirates of the Caribbean film series, was formerly on display in the lagoon, but as of November 2010, it had been removed and taken to another location on the island where it was dismantled.

Approximately 60 Disney Cruise Line employees live and work full time on Castaway Cay in company-provided bungalows. On-site amenities available to resident staff include a gym, store, cafeteria, bar, and a private beach. A smaller number of employees reside on Abaco and commute by company-operated boats. The island has an 80,000-US-gallon (300,000 L) freshwater storage tank that is replenished by visiting ships. A solar array supplies up to 70 percent of the island’s electricity requirements. The remaining electrical demand is met by generators fueled with biodiesel produced using up to 8,000 US gallons (30,000 L) of used cooking oil collected annually from ship galleys.

=== Airport ===
Castaway Cay Airport
- IATA: none; ICAO: MYAG

Summary
- Airport type: Private
- Serves: Castaway Cay
- Location: the Bahamas
- Elevation AMSL: 5 ft (1.5 m)
- Coordinates: 26°5′26.0″N 77°32′23.9″W

Map
- Location of Castaway Cay Airport in the Bahamas

Runways
Direction	Length		Surface
Direction	m	ft	Surface
14/32	945	3,100	Asphalt
- Source: Landings.com

Castaway Cay Airport (ICAO: MYAG) is a private use airport located in Castaway Cay, the Bahamas.

== See also ==
- List of islands of the Bahamas
- Lookout Cay at Lighthouse Point, Disney's second major private resort in the Caribbean
- Private island
