= Gush =

Gush is a sudden flow (as in a washout, storm surge, or blood gush) or excessive enthusiasm.

Gush may also refer to:

- Gush (album), 1995 music album by Lowlife
- Gush (band)
- George Gush, historian
- Richard Gush (1789–1858), South African settler
- William Gush (1813–1888), painter

== Israel ==
(Gush is Hebrew: גוש for bloc)

- Gush Dan
- Gush Emunim
- Gush Etzion
- Gush Halav
- Gush Hispin
- Gush Katif
- Gush Shalom
- Yeshivat Har Etzion

== Places in Iran ==
(Persian: گوش)

- Gush, Razavi Khorasan
- Gush, South Khorasan

== See also ==
- Bloc (disambiguation)
- Fāl-gūsh, the act of standing in a dark corner spot or behind a fence and listening to the conversations of passersby
- Gusher (disambiguation)
- Spurt (disambiguation)
- Squirt (disambiguation)
