= Spray =

Spray or spraying commonly refer to:

- Spray (liquid drop)
  - Aerosol spray
  - Blood spray
  - Hair spray
  - Nasal spray
  - Pepper spray
  - PAVA spray
  - Road spray or tire spray, road debris kicked up from a vehicle tire
  - Sea spray, refers to aerosol particles that form in the ocean
- Spraying, or the creation of a spray
  - Spraying (animal behavior), the action of an animal marking its territory with urine
  - The use of a spray bottle
  - The use of a sprayer
  - Aerial application of chemicals
  - Spray painting

Spray or spraying may also refer to:

== People ==
- Ruth Hinshaw Spray (1848–1929), American peace activist

== Places ==
- Spray, North Carolina, a former mill town in Rockingham County, North Carolina, now part of Eden, North Carolina

== Arts, entertainment, and media ==
- Spray (band), a British synthpop band
- Spray (video game), a 2008 video game for Nintendo's Wii video game console

== Brands and enterprises ==
- Spray Network, a Swedish Internet company

== Computing ==
- Heap spraying in a computer security exploit
- JIT spraying, a specialised version of the above

== Ships ==
- Spray (sailing vessel), the ship used in Joshua Slocum's solo circumnavigation in the late 19th century
- USS Spray (ID-2491), a trawler in commission in the United States Navy from 1918 to 1919
- USS Spray II (SP-308), a motorboat ordered delivered to the United States Navy in 1917 for use as a patrol vessel but never taken over by the Navy

== Other uses ==
- Spray (mathematics), a type of vector field in differential geometry defined on the tangent bundle of a manifold

== See also ==
- Gush (disambiguation)
- Spay (disambiguation)
- Spry (disambiguation)
- Spurt (disambiguation)
- Squirt (disambiguation)
