= Spry =

Spry may refer to:

- Spry, Pennsylvania
- Spry (surname), people with the surname Spry
- Spry Vegetable Shortening
- Spry, Inc., creator of Internet in a Box, one of the first commercial software packages for connecting to the Internet.
- Spry framework, an open-source Ajax framework for web development

== See also ==
- Spray (disambiguation)
- Spy (disambiguation)
