= Seaspray =

Seaspray may refer to:

- Sea spray, aerosol particles formed directly from the ocean

== Military ==
- SEASPRAY, a clandestine U.S. Army special operations unit
- Operation Sea-Spray, a secret U.S. Navy experiment in which bacteria were sprayed over the San Francisco Bay Area in California
- Seaspray (radar), a series of British radar systems

== Boats and ships ==
- MV Empire Seaspray, the Seaspray, an Empire ship, a cancelled cargo ship of the British WWII shipping service
- Seaspray (sailboat), a real sail boat that was fictionalized for the Australian TV show Adventures of the Seaspray

== Entertainment ==
- Seaspray (Transformers), the name of several fictional characters in the Transformers series
- "Sea Spray" (Paul Weller song), from the 2008 album 22 Dreams

== Other uses ==
- Seaspray, Victoria, Australia; a small coastal town in Gippsland

== See also ==
- Seaspray group, a geological stratigraphic unit located in the Halibut Oil Field area, in the Tasman Strait, off the cost of Victoria
- Spray (disambiguation)
- Sea (disambiguation)
- Ocean Spray (disambiguation)
