= Ocean Spray =

Ocean Spray may refer to:

- Sea spray, aerosol particles formed from the ocean
- Ocean Spray (cooperative), a group of fruit growers
- "Ocean Spray" (Manic Street Preachers song)
- "Ocean Spray" (Moneybagg Yo song)
- Ocean Spray Hotel, Miami Beach, Miami-Dade, Florida, USA; a historic hotel
- Holodiscus discolor, a type of flowering shrub

== See also ==
- Ocean (disambiguation)
- Spray (disambiguation)
- Seaspray (disambiguation)
