= Mist =

Phenomenon caused by small droplets of water suspended in air

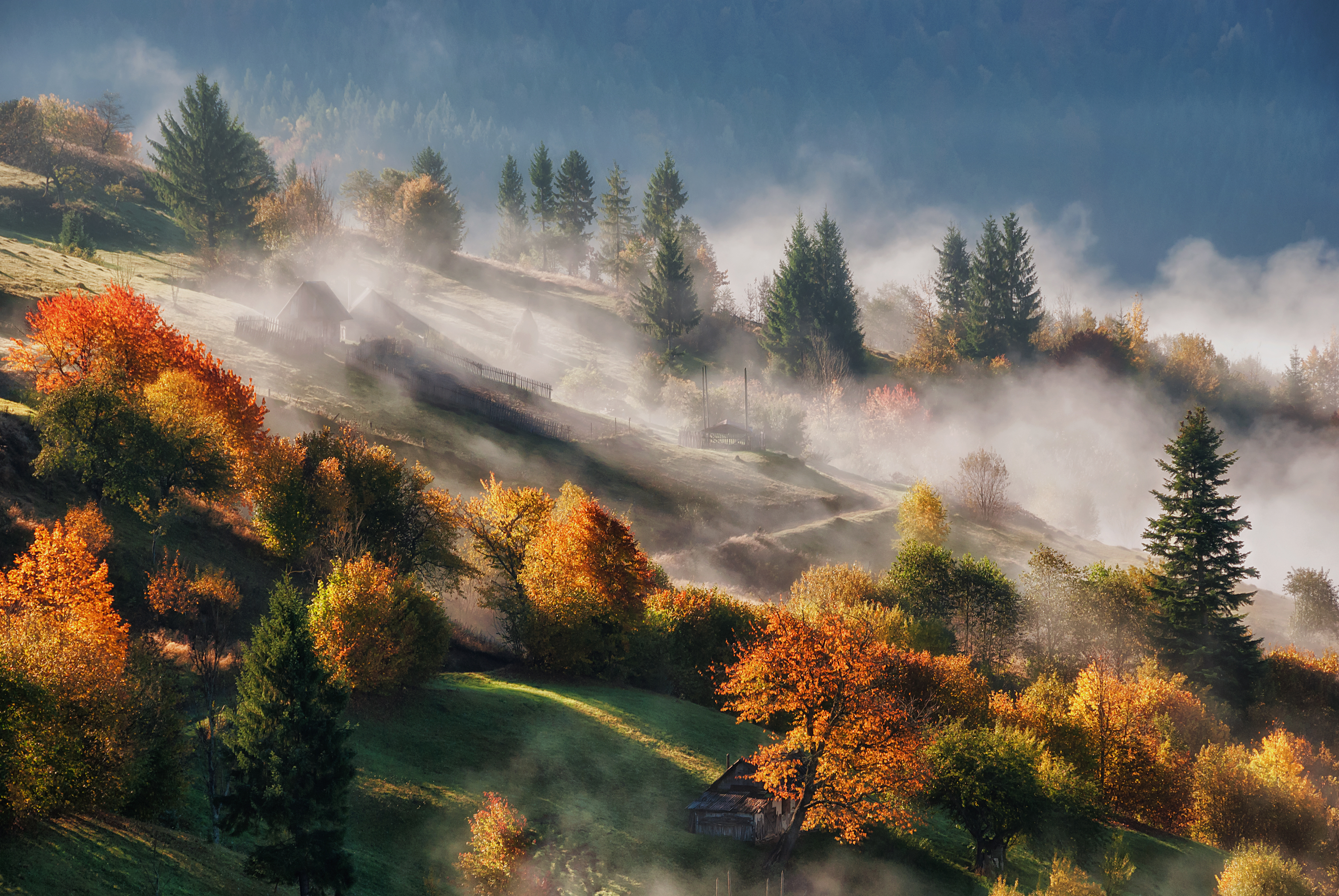
A misty autumn morning in the outskirts of Rakhiv, Carpathian Biosphere Reserve, Ukraine

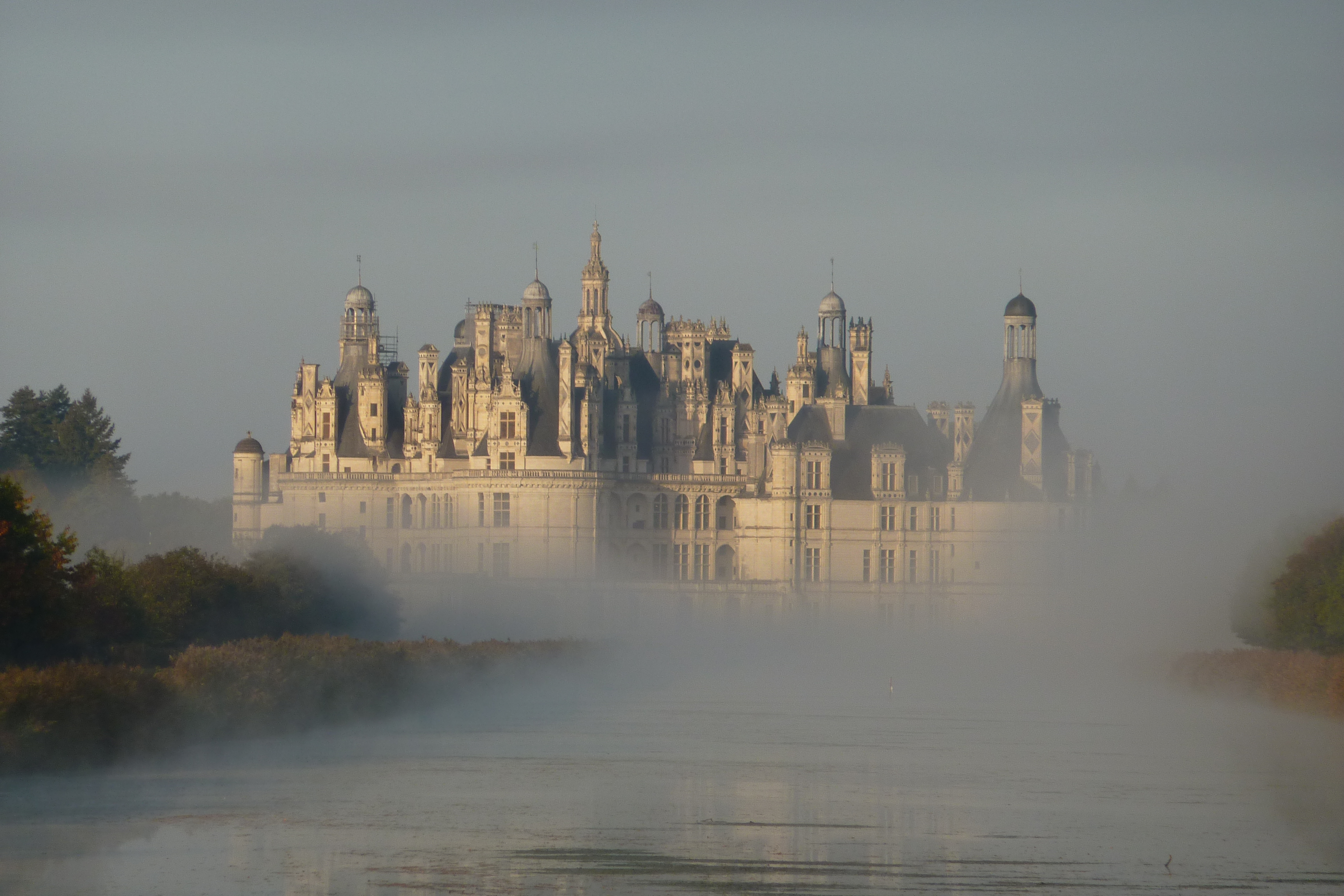
The Château de Chambord in France, in mist

Mist is a natural phenomenon caused by small droplets of water aerosols suspended in the cold air, usually by condensation. Physically, it is an example of a dispersion, most commonly seen where water vapor in warm, moist air meets sudden cooling, such as in exhaled air in the winter, or when hot sauna steam is suddenly released outside. Mist occurs naturally as part of weather, typically when humid air comes into contact with surfaces that are much cooler (e.g. mountains). It can also be created artificially with aerosol spray dispensers if the humidity and temperature conditions are right.

The formation of mist, as of other suspensions, is greatly aided by the presence of nucleation sites on which the suspended water phase can congeal. Thus even such unusual sources of nucleation as small ejecta particulates from volcanic eruptions, releases of strongly polar gases, and even the magnetospheric ions associated with polar lights can in right conditions trigger condensation and mist formation.

Mist is commonly confused with fog, which resembles a stratus cloud lying at ground level. These two phenomena differ, but share some commonalities; similar condensation processes form both fog and mist. Fog is denser, more opaque and generally lasts a longer time, while mist is thinner and more transparent.

== Description ==
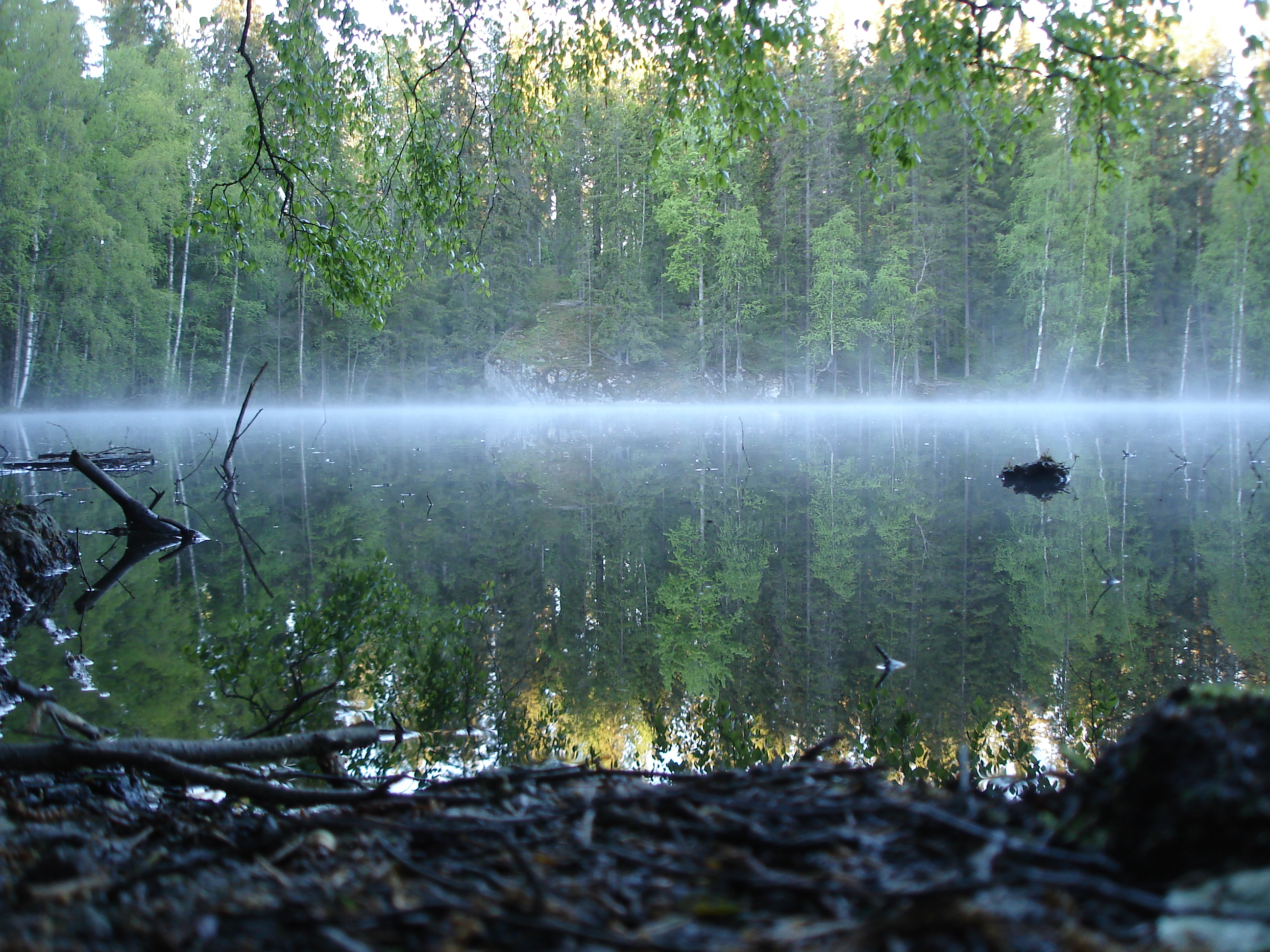
A light morning mist on Lake Suolijärvi in Hervanta, Tampere, Finland

Cloud cover is often referred to as "mist" when encountered on surfaces of mountains, whereas moisture suspended above a body of water, cleared or marsh area is usually called "fog". One main difference between mist and fog is visibility. The phenomenon is called fog if the visibility is 1 km (1,100 yd) or less. In the United Kingdom, the definition of fog is visibility less than 100 m (330 ft) on the surface for driving purposes, while for pilots the distance is 1 km at cruising height. Otherwise, it is known as mist.

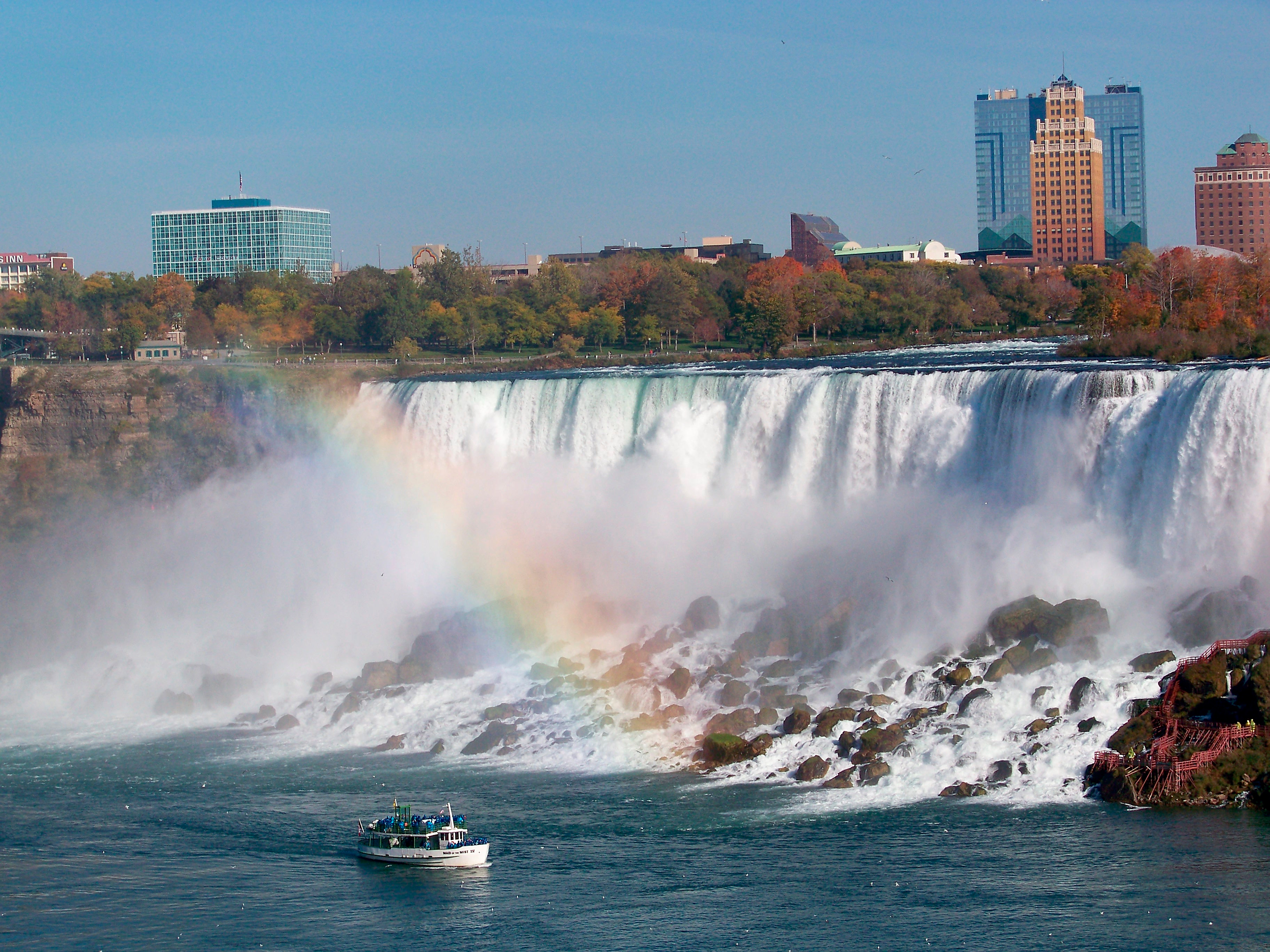
A rainbow formed from the water spray at American Falls

Mist makes a light beam visible from the side via refraction and scattering on the suspended water droplets, and rainbows can be possibly created.

"Scotch mist" is a light steady drizzle that appears like mist.

Mist usually occurs near the shores and is often associated with fog. Mist can be as high as mountain tops when extreme temperatures are low and strong condensation occurs.

Freezing mist is similar to freezing fog, only the density is less and the visibility greater. When fog falls below 0°C, it is known as freezing fog; however, it still stays suspended.

== See also ==
- Aerosol
- Aeroponics
- Brocken spectre
- Drizzle
- Fog
- Haze
- Spray (disambiguation)
- Rain
