= List of The Kingdom Keepers characters =

This is a list of characters from The Kingdom Keepers, a series of children's novels by Ridley Pearson.

== Characters ==
=== The Kingdom Keepers ===
Five teens have been chosen to serve as holographic guide models for Disney Host Interactive (DHI) at Walt Disney World. A glitch in the technology transports the kids to the Parks in their holographic forms. This turns out to be a ruse by Wayne Kresky, a Disney Imagineer, to choose a team of children with a balanced set of skills to battle the Overtakers. The Kingdom Keepers embark on quests to prevent any evil from destroying Disney. Their struggle against the Overtakers is legendary inside and outside the Park to characters and humans, although the humans think their battles are performances. In DHI form, the Keepers can go "all clear" (become pure hologram) to bypass obstacles; fear makes them more material, and vulnerable to harm. Version 2.0 eliminated the problem, but it was withdrawn in "The Insider" because the Imagineers feared that the military would try to use it. How each Keeper goes "all clear" is unique; Finn pictures exiting a dark tunnel (which he teaches the others to do, and does to awake as his hologram), while Willa, Philby, and Charlene (in "The Insider") focus on the one they love.

- Lawrence Finnegan "Finn" Whitman: Finn Whitman is the leader of the DHI's (the Keepers). He is not sure why he is the chosen leader and sees himself as an equal to the other DHI's. As the series progresses, Finn realizes it is his responsibility to lead. Physically, Finn is an average middle school boy. He has brown hair, green eyes, is slim, and is about 5 ft 4in tall. He loves Amanda and is very protective of her. He is very brave and confident. He has a little sister, a mother, and a father. He seems to be a bit intimidated by his father, Donald Whitman. In "Disney in Shadow", his mom decides to help them with the teams' endeavors. Whenever the Keepers need a plan, they always seem to turn to Finn. Crossing over at night into Disney World changes the Keepers to part hologram and part human. Finn is the only Keeper who can become a full hologram for a long amount of time, and while he is awake. Ironically, this makes him think of himself as part Fairly. Finn has a balance of courage, smarts, athleticism, and control over his DHI powers. All the Keepers are fond of him because of his protectiveness, but Finn's morals changed from "Dark Passage" onward, probably due to an electrical shock he received in DHI form. His anger overrides his better judgement, leaving him willing to kill the Overtakers, who have no qualms about doing so themselves. He fatally ripped a hole in Maleficent, tried killing Tia Dalma, and nearly strangled Cruella De Vil.
- Charlene Turner: Charlene has blonde hair, blue eyes, and described as overall "beautiful". She appears scared of anything under the sun, especially Maleficent. She was chosen to be a DHI because "She has the look of the typical American Girl Teenager". Her strengths are athleticisms and gymnastics; this proves useful for stealth. She is a cheerleader, dancer, track runner, and champion gymnast. She is an important contribution to the team, often being used as a decoy. She can solve tough situations and has referred to herself as a "Scrabble wiz". In "Disney After Dark" she is very soft-spoken and quiet. She is given the nickname "Charlie" by Finn in "Disney at Dawn". In "Power Play", she is put under a spell by the Evil Queen, to gather information on the Keepers. Her feelings for Finn are much more obvious, but one-sided. In "Shell Game", she kisses Finn in order to get over her feelings. In "Shell Game" and "Dark Passage", she begins to develop feelings for Maybeck; this proves to be a good thing as Maybeck was put in Sleeping Beauty Syndrome by the Queen and needed true love's kiss to be awakened. During the time skip between "Dark Passage" and "The Insider", Charlene had become quite a popular actress thanks to her good looks (having appeared on Good Luck Charlie often), but she does not let the fame go to her head. In "The Syndrome", it is revealed that she now shares an apartment with a famous actress, who she told all about her adventures.
- Terrance Maybeck (Donnie or Terry): Maybeck is an African American boy who is fiercely proud of his heritage, often believing others think poorly of it; he is also a Baptist. He lives with his Aunt "Jelly", who tends to swear and looks older than his age as he is about a head taller than everyone else. He believes many girls are attracted to him. He is skeptical about almost everything in Jez's diary and is the first Kingdom Keeper to disagree with Finn (though he does follow through with Finn's orders). Donnie is his stage name. Maybeck loves his Aunt Jelly and hates anyone who hurts his friends and family. He is strong, as seen when he held Scar's puppet head for a long time and when he crushed an OTK with a chair. His strength makes him a great asset to the Keepers. In "Dark Passage", Maybeck falls into a coma due to a lightning strike caused by Maleficent; he was able to will himself awake after his DHI form was informed about this by Finn. When the Evil Queen puts him in "The Syndrome", Charlene awakens him with true love's kiss. They remained a couple throughout the time skip between "Dark Passage" and "The Insider". Despite Charlene's acting career keeping them separated often, the narration says Maybeck is in agony for not being able to be with her. Charlene is the only person who makes Maybeck break his emotional mask.
- Isabella Angelo (Willa): Willa is sweet, geeky, smart, and brave. She is described as either Native American or Asian since in "Disney After Dark" she was seen running on the cover and her skin was dark. She does archery, climbing, and swimming, which, along with her skills of understanding language and clues, is useful to the team. Her mother is very protective of her, to the point of threatening Finn (who she told her mother to go to before anyone else) to get her out of "The Syndrome". She likes Philby (a reciprocated feeling both are not able to express in the first five books) and both are the most technically smart of the Keepers. She does not trust Storey Ming; in "The Insider" this is good intuition, since Storey is possessed by Ursula. Willa trusts Finn with secrets, and they are paired in "Shell Game". To wake Philby from Sleeping Beauty Syndrome, Willa kissed him; since then, they have officially become a couple. Their relationship is an odd one; Philby "says what she wants to hear at the wrong time(s)". In "The Insider", Willa doubts herself since she is not like most girls her age, though still becomes a strong girl.
- Dell Philby: Known as "Philby", he is intelligent and knowledgeable about technology. Finn thinks of him as a know-it-all who does not get into face about it. He is mildly seen as second-in-command, and he is the guy to go to for information about every inch of the Parks. He is great at climbing and is well liked by the girls at his school although he could not care less about them. His first name is mentioned by his mother in "Power Play", and also appears in the "Keeper Profiles" on KKO. Philby has red hair and, having spent some of his childhood in England, a British accent. His mother, Gladis, is paranoid about his safety. He also has a crush on Willa and is jealous that she and Maybeck are together in most of the Kingdom Keeper missions. He seems to set himself apart from the other Keepers in "Shell Game", thinking he is smarter than everyone. His ego shrinks after he is told off by Finn. At the end of "Dark Passage", he and Willa officially become a couple, following true love's kiss to awaken him from "The Syndrome". In "The Insider", Philby is the most disappointed of the Keepers with missing graduation because he was one of the three top students and would be giving a speech. He is also paranoid about the Imagineers keeping tabs on them. At the end of "The Insider", Philby convinces Finn to join the rest of the Keepers in looking into the meaning of Jess's latest drawing, and what connection it may have to Wayne's final message.

=== Fairlies ===
A pun on "fairly human", each Fairly has one supernatural talent. The government rounds up the Fairlies and imprisons them in a facility in Baltimore, Maryland to study their powers and replicate them for military purposes. Amanda and Jess, on the run from the facility for years, are now protected by Disney. Some of the novels explain that they have changed their appearance or are using nicknames. In "The Syndrome", their powers are shown to have evolved.

- Amanda Lockhart: A girl of the same age who helps Finn locate the other four DHIs in their real-life aspects; she seems to have a few secrets of her own. She is very good with people and is interested in Finn. Amanda is very strong with a good head on her shoulders. She is occasionally sarcastic, but in a funny and charming way. She is described as having "exotic eyes, a deep, natural, tan, and freckles on her cheeks". She is about an inch taller than Finn. She is considered an honorary Keeper, and in "Disney in Shadow" even becomes a DHI. Amanda's power is to push things; this is retained in her DHI state. She can levitate small objects and push things away from her even if they are not near her. She tells Finn that this leaks into her relationships and that she naturally "pushes" people away. Finn tells her he is like a yo-yo, and that he will keep coming back. Amanda is in love with Finn but wonders about what their relationship is through the last four books of the series. In "Power Play", Finn kisses her (partly due to a spell by the Evil Queen), but she does not fight him off. In "Shell Game", she and Finn get into an argument before Finn goes on the Cruise Ship, so she is confused whether they are together or not. When Finn runs to jump off the ship with Willa, he sees Amanda's DHI and thinks about how he loves her. In "The Insider", they attend Senior prom together, but unlike the other couples, they try to keep a sliver of distance between them while dancing. In "The Insider", Jess notes that Amanda hates being called "Mandy", unless it is by Finn. Amanda and Jess have also gotten scholarships, courtesy of the Keepers' hard work for Disney. In "The Syndrome", Amanda's strong love and desire to protect Finn allowed her powers to evolve, granting her telekinesis both properties of magnetism - repel and attract; she also no longer needs both her hands to direct the blast.
- Jessica Lockhart (Jez, Jezebel or Jess): A mysterious, gifted girl who first appears in "Disney After Dark". Not much is initially known about her until it is revealed she is somewhat of an apprentice to Maleficent, possessing "magic" of her own. Towards the end of "Disney After Dark" she is revealed to be Amanda's pseudo-sister, by the real name of Jess, cursed by Maleficent to prevent her from using her powers. Though Jess and Amanda are not biologically related, they consider each other sisters. Although her name is revealed to be Jess, she is always referred to as Jez, when the author is referring to her in "Disney at Dawn", but in "Disney in Shadow", she is Jess. Her name changes as often as her hair; as an unintended side-effect of Finn breaking Maleficent's curse, Jess' hair turned white, forcing her to dye it repeatedly, primarily blonde. She is considered an honorary Keeper, also becoming a DHI in "Disney in Shadow". In "Disney at Dawn", she has a boyfriend named Rob, but he is not mentioned again until "The Insider", suggesting they broke up. Her power is seeing the future in dreams, and sometimes daydreams. In "The Insider", Jess has become increasingly horrified by her dreams (due to the mayhem that the Overtakers would be causing), becoming insomniac to keep from dreaming. Jess sees a vision of lightning, which is what slays Chernabog. Wayne gifts her with Walt's first pen, which is magical in her hands. Anything she draws becomes real, but she cannot erase what is not a part of the characters' world; she uses this to revive Mickey Mouse from the original Mortimer Mouse drawing. In "The Syndrome", Jess starts having vision the moment a key item is mentioned or shown to her, showing a growth of her powers.

=== Mentors ===
The Keepers are guided by Wayne Kresky and his daughter, Wanda. Wayne and Wanda's methods of assistance differ; Wayne prefers difficult riddles and clues, and Wanda directly assists them in any way she can.

- Wayne Kresky: An elderly Imagineer who acts as the group's mentor and guide. He speaks in mystical clichés, often annoying the Keepers. He firmly states "Disney doesn't kill anything", not even the Overtakers; this is something that backfires repeatedly because he just incarcerates the villains, who end up escaping. He helped come up with the idea of DHIs to save the Magic Kingdom. Finn thinks he knows more than he lets on but learns to trust him. Wayne was personally hired by Walt himself, which makes him a great addition to the Keepers team. He is in fact a real cast member at Walt Disney World and was put into the novel after he showed the author Ridley Pearson around the Magic Kingdom ride Splash Mountain. Wayne seems harsh to Finn in "Shell Game", appearing at the end of "Dark Passage" much to the Keepers' surprise. In "The Insider", Wayne is framed by the Overtakers for stealing important files; he later gives his life to protect Willa from Judge Doom. He left a final message for the Keepers recorded in a music box. This leads the Keepers to use the DHI technology to time travel to the opening day of Disneyland; there Wayne's younger self meets with them.
- Wanda Alcott: Wayne's daughter helps the Keepers reach places and areas inaccessible without employee keys. She is introduced in the 3rd installment, acting on her father's behalf since he was still in hiding at the time. In "Power Play", Wanda hacks into the DHI server to check activity, falling into a trap laid by the Overtakers to have her arrested. Finn's mother bails her out. She continues to help the Keepers into the Parks. At first, the Keepers did not trust Wanda, but her name - "Wanda" (which Wayne derived from Mickey's magic wand) - and the genetic similarities convinced the Keepers she was really Wayne's daughter. In "The Insider", she is referred to as "Wanda Kresky" by the Imagineers, implying Alcott is an alias she uses. During "The Syndrome", she lets Amanda and Jess stay at her home, and later helps hide them at her father's cabin, along with the Keepers; both the OTKs and Barracks 14 were posing a threat.

=== Overtakers ===
The Overtakers are the series' principal antagonists. Walt Disney foresaw the emergence of the Overtakers, knowing that the more one believes in something, the more real it becomes—the more belief in the characters, the closer they get to the real world. The Overtakers intend to rule the parks and the world outside. Most are antagonists of Disney films and attractions and are capable of thought. Minor characters, incapable of thought, are their soldiers (often mere animated statues). Chernabog rules the main faction of the Overtakers, with Jafar, Shan Yu, and Ursula having their own storylines. The Overtakers are sometimes invisible to humans or security cameras; in the first novel, this allowed them to steal supplies to upgrade the cells below Pirates of the Caribbean. The Return reveals the Overtakers were created by a witch doctor called The Traveler as part of a pact with Amery Hollingsworth.

- Maleficent: The dark fairy from Sleeping Beauty who acts as the antagonist in the story. She is by far the most recurring villain and the main enforcer of Chernabog. Her very presence gives off a chill, but this is to ensure the full strength of her magic as a warm environment weakens her. While the park is open, Maleficent often replaces the Cast Member playing her in the Fantasmic! show. Despite her power and reputation, Maleficent is not the leader of the Overtakers. Most that do not know her by name call her "The Green One". She is captured at the end of "Disney after Dark", rescued at the beginning of the second, captured again at the end of the third, and released again at the end of the fourth. She has a DHI form, used to engineer her escape. After her second escape, Maleficent usually pairs with another of the Overtakers sorceresses, like Tia Dalma or the Evil Queen; repeated defeats likely taught her to have backup. She is killed in "Dark Passage" when Finn used his DHI powers to rip a hole in her. In "The Insider", Finn remembers that Maleficent once said she served a more powerful witch; he considers this to be Ursula. Tia Dalma brings Maleficent back in the epilogue of "The Insider", but in "Legacy of Secrets", Maleficent is revealed to be deformed with stronger magic. She is mentioned repeatedly in "The Syndrome", but never appears.
  - Diablo: Maleficent's right-hand raven. He served his mistress well during the maiden voyage of the Dream. Diablo attacked and wounded Philby before being captured; his life was spared, thanks to Willa talking Philby down. Finn used him as a shield against Maleficent in "Dark Passage". Three years later in "The Insider", Diablo leads an attack on Phibly and Willa with several other ravens, most likely to avenge his mistress's death.
- Blackbeard: A minor Overtaker, he and his crew of pirates serve Maleficent in their goal to rule the world. They were first seen by Finn, salvaging carts from the Buzz Lightyear's Space Ranger Spin ride to help with their cause. They came from the Pirates of the Caribbean attraction. He appears only in "Disney After Dark". The character is not based on the Blackbeard from Pirates of the Caribbean: On Stranger Tides.
  - Pirates: Generic lesser characters from the Pirates of the Caribbean attraction. Classified as worker bees, they are often employed by the Overtakers as guards.
- Chernabog: True leader of the Overtakers, described as "the most powerful demon Walt Disney ever created", he is also the demon from the Disney film Fantasia. At the beginning of "Disney at Dawn", he was supposed to be on the Disney Villains float at the DHI-Day Celebration, but he disappears; the Overtakers mistook the statue for the genuine him. He is caught at the end of the third, but escapes at the end of the fourth. Chernabog also has a DHI form. Nobody knows his full powers, but his powers are in a journal stolen by Maleficent in KK 5 but taken back by Finn. He is snuck aboard the Disney Dream in "Shell Game" and brought to full power in "Dark Passage" by licking Dillard's blood. Finn later traps him in a small chamber with flooding with water. However, three years later, Tia Dalma frees him and facilitates his transport to Disneyland. According to the Evil Queen, Chernabog is childish despite being Disney's ultimate evil, with death being his answer to everything; even the Keepers say that Chernabog "isn't exactly a candidate for the debate team". He is destroyed by a lightning strike, but one of his wings was used by Tia Dalma in a brew to resurrect Maleficent.
- Captain Hook: Mentioned briefly by a Cast Member dressed as Ariel in "Disney at Dawn", he was snooping around Ariel's Grotto, having been sent by the Overtakers in investigate the meaning in Jess playing songs over the park speakers.
- Cruella De Vil: An Overtaker in "Power Play", Cruella is the main villain from Disney's One Hundred and One Dalmatians. She first appears in DisneyQuest, and follows the Evil Queen around, acting like a sidekick. She has a rather big mouth, often blurting things out until silenced. Cruella is important to the Overtakers as she knows how the modern world works; most of the Overtakers do not come from a modern era (such as the mid-1900s) like she does. She has a bad temper and is more of a nuisance than a threat, since she has no combat ability. Cruella also has a DHI. Revealed in "The Insider", Cruella has the magical ability to control animals including the Hyenas; this was hinted to even work on Chernabog in "Shell Game". She also lives in a luxurious decommissioned train compartment. Cruella is nearly strangled to death when Finn is overcome by bloodlust and revenge, but she escapes; however, Finn tosses a wrench at her, leaving Cruella out-of-commission for the rest of the story.
  - Hyenas: The vicious carnivores from The Lion King, they fear Scar, even if cowering at a mere mask of him. One of the hyenas is killed by Luowski to retrieve a swallowed flash drive. They mostly follow Cruella's orders. Maleficent has said they are indeed useful, and it was a shame to kill one. Cruella names two Happy and Howly.
- The Evil Queen: An Overtaker in "Power Play", she also first appears in DisneyQuest. A selfish woman, and a trickster, she puts spells on several of the characters. Her only weakness is her reflection, due to her vanity. She becomes a temporary leader of the Overtakers in "Power Play", making her third-in-command. She had the idea of creating Overtakers DHIs. She can transform herself and tricked Willa by turning herself into Finn to capture her. She ends up trapped with Chernabog at the end of "Dark Passage" until "The Insider", where Tia Dalma helps them escape; during her captivity, the Queen learned how to understand Chernabog and found him aggravating because of his childish fits. She has some vague knowledge of modern technology, as she warned Chernabog against showing himself during their transport to Disneyland as the "metal bricks have magic memory".
  - Card Soldiers: The minions of the Queen of Hearts from Alice in Wonderland. They, along with the Small World dolls, are the army the Evil Queen has guarding Tia Dalma in the abandoned Skyway Station.
  - Magic Mirror: Mentioned by Maybeck in "The Insider".
  - Spiders: Conjured by the Evil Queen to torture Willa with her arachnophobia in "Power Play". They are later turned into rattlesnakes, to serve as Gigabyte's soldiers in chasing the Keepers.
  - Jays: They dive-bomb Charlene and Maybeck in the Disney Power House in "Power Play"; Maybeck and Charlene guess they used to be the security guards until the Evil Queen enchanted them. The Evil Queen changes them into gorillas to attack the Keepers, but they are scared off by pain of stepping on broken glass. It remains unknown if the Queen's magic wore off or the victims were sent to a zoo.
- Frollo: An Overtaker who only appears in "Power Play", who commands the Toy Story Green Army Men. He is the main antagonist of the Disney film The Hunchback of Notre Dame. Frollo is a wicked man, obsessed with his own version of law and order, but he is loyal to the Overtakers' plot. He despises children, even trying to drown Willa when she refuses to reveal what news of the future Jess drew on a napkin. On his own, he presents a very small threat given he has no supernatural powers. The Queen has said Frollo is more patient than her. He was briefly seen in "Shell Game" as one of the many villains entering the Disney Dream.
  - Toy Story Green Army Men: Despite being good characters in Toy Story, they serve the Overtakers. They attack Willa in "Power Play" under Frollo's orders from the Evil Queen. Maybeck captures them in "Shell Game", by using a glue trap.
  - Frollo's soldiers: Soldiers of Judge Frollo. They chase Willa to spaceship Earth. Willa got rid of most of them by telling children they had candy and to get it they had to squeeze tightly and do not let go. Two patrolled spaceship Earth looking for Willa.
- Shan-Yu: Appearing in "Power Play", he controls the Chinese warriors and speaks little English. He wants the DHI's magic for himself. Residing in Epoct, he considers the "invisible ones" (the Keepers) to be spies for an emperor. Finn tries convincing Shan Yu that he is not but decides to take advantage of his beliefs to convince him "the great lord Disney" was looking for allies against the Green One - Maleficent. He tried to kill Finn in the fourth book but was not strong enough. Finn manages to outwit him and buy time to think of an escape plan by playing on Shan Yu's belief in following the will of Gods.
  - Chinese Warriors: These Overtakers from Mulan take orders from Shan-Yu. At least, there are eight of them.
- Jafar: Appearing in "Power Play", Jafar is the main villain from Aladdin. He can use his magical powers he has in his film, including the ability to use his staff to hypnotize others and transform into various objects, like a snake and a coil of rope. Maybeck considers Jafar the evilest Disney villain because he ruthlessly kills and manipulates others for power. Jafar dislikes giving autographs, considering an insult to his dignity. He does not follow the other Overtakers' agenda and wants the DHI's magic for himself. He was defeated by Willa's ability to charm him like a snake. Maleficent coaxed him into joining Chernabog's side by promising the lamp in return during "Shell Game", but he is back to his own agenda in "The Insider", confronting Finn and Maybeck. Jafar seems to hold a high opinion of Maleficent, given his surprise at Finn's announcement of killing her. As a giant snake, he almost swallows Maybeck whole, but ends up being badly wounded by Rajah.
  - Iago: Jafar's parrot lackey. Unlike his film counterpart, Iago does not give wisecracks. He divebombs the Keepers when their DHIs get shrunken.
  - Scepter: Jafar's scepter can morph into a real snake, and still retains its hypnosis powers. It is also rarely seen without Jafar.
- Horned King: An Overtaker briefly seen in "Power Play", he is the main antagonist of The Black Cauldron.
- Gaston: An Overtaker briefly seen in "Power Play" on Tom Sawyer Island, Gaston is an egotistical and dense villain of Beauty and the Beast.
- Prince John: An Overtaker briefly seen in "Power Play", Prince John is the greedy ruler of Nottingham.
- Ursula: In "Shell Game" she attacks Finn and King Triton at Typhoon Lagoon when Finn says her name, accidentally summoning her. In "The Insider", it is revealed that Ursula had been possessing Storey Ming, hoping to use the Keepers to eliminate Chernabog's Overtakers, but being in contact with water will cause her binding to Storey to start coming undone. Finn and Violet worked together to fight her; due to continually growing, she accidentally gets herself stuck inside a sinking ship in the park. She is the "enemy within" that the Keepers were warned about.
  - Flotsam and Jetsam: Ursula's beloved pet eels. Unlike their film counterparts, they are much uglier and have several scars. Unless Ursula is giving them commands, they are relatively harmless as they are only seeking out food, primarily what is left behind in the park dumpsters. Ursula beat them up while posing as Storey Ming to reinforce the Keeper's trust in her.
- Tia Dalma: In "Shell Game" she is spied on by the Keepers on Castaway Cay, and is seen talking to six cast members of Disney Dream and Jafar. She is also taken on to the Disney Dream when the boat leaves Castaway Cay. She is captured in "Dark Passage". Finn sees her as more powerful than Maleficent or the Evil Queen because black magic is more closely tied to the real world than the sorcery the other Disney villains have. She escapes captivity in "The Insider", freeing Chernabog and taking him to Disneyland for the final battle. Tia Dalma remained confident in her side's victory, despite Finn correctly pointing out that history shows evil self-destructs. After the Sky Station fire, Tia Dalma remains hidden; after Chernabog is fried by a lightning strike, she collects one of his wings. Tia Dalma uses the wing as one of the ingredients in a magical brew, which she uses to resurrect Maleficent. Like Jafar, she respects Maleficent to some degree; when she discovered the witch's remains at the start of "The Insider", she lamented the death of one of the greatest practitioners of dark magic.
- Madame Leota: Coming from the Haunted Mansion attraction, she resides in the basement and is most likely its ruler. She only appears in "The Insider", where her full story is told to Maybeck by Charlene and appears in two different forms. Showing Leota her reflection will get rid of her, since she hates being reminded of what she did and what she has become. She scared patrons during park hours but was tasered and left badly burnt.
  - Wraiths: Ghoulish minions that can suck out the very life from others, even the energy in the Keepers' DHIs, by simply touching them; nearly falling victim, Maybeck realizes no-one call pull away because the process is hypnotic. They will even suck life out of their wounded comrades. Smashing their skulls temporarily reduces them to ash. They are stupid enough to try following their targets through shut doors, only to smash into them futilely. Philby originally guessed that they could also be Doctor Facilier's "friends on the other side".
  - Demons: Creatures possessing the dead. Able to possess new hosts (even the Keepers in DHI form, Philby guesses) by looking them in the eyes, but stabbing the demons in their eyes causes them to pop like balloons. They have trouble thinking for themselves, so a really hard riddle can stun them; in other words, they are stupid. Despite the corpse-like movements, they are capable of levitation at high speeds and can tear through metal.
  - Ghosts: Coming from the cemetery of the Haunted Mansion, they are the embodiments of those who had unfinished business in the land of the living and could not pass on; they are transparent. Some dressed up as repairmen to infiltrate Ariel's Undersea Adventure, where they chase Storey Ming/Ursula, who nearly reveals her true self before King Triton reduces them to ashes.
- Judge Doom: In "The Insider", he attacks the Keepers in Toontown. He is a toon disguised as a human, having the ability to transform parts of himself into whatever he needs, though he favors a simple knife in the book. He is the closest thing the Overtakers have to an assassin, and Doom will do anything for money. Doom is referred to as an "out-of-work villain", since the original attraction Doom came from stopped showing him in later years. After being blasted by Amanda's telekinesis, Doom was left with a dislocated jaw and mangled left leg. After the earthquake, Doom is charged with putting the Partners statue on top the Matterhorn to attract lightning, but Maybeck and Charlene's interference leaves him trapped in the crane operating cabin when lighting reduces it to sludge. A pun was written about his fate - "Inside is the Judge, Doomed".
  - Toon Patrol: A group of gangster weasels that work for Judge Doom. They help attack the Keepers in Toontown. The only way to kill them is to make them laugh themselves to death, just like in the film. Psycho, a weasel in a straitjacket, fights Willa.
- Hades: Mentioned in "The Insider" by some ghouls under his command, though he does not make an actual appearance within the series. Hades' Number 1 Rule is "no complaining". It is said he is always watching his minions and hears everything they say, never being too far away and making them watch their backs for him. The Evil Queen says that he and Chernabog are brothers. Tia Dalma also believed she may have accidentally opened a path to his realm (the Underworld) in "The Insider", when she frees Chernabog and the Evil Queen from the labyrinth in Mexico. He is mentioned again in The Return.
  - Souls: The deceased that serve Hades. They dislike that Hades melts any metals they had but know to shut up when they think he will hear them and retaliate for breaking his Number 1 rule. Finn's team passes them on the way to Big Thunder Mountain.
  - Pain and Panic: First appear in "Disney Lands" they attack a security guard in broad daylight while searching for Willa. unlike their film's counterparts they are more ruthless and murderous but do talk like idiots.
- Headless Horseman: Introduced in "The Insider", he tries to kill Finn and Willa on the banks of Frontierland. He comes from The Adventures of Ichabod and Mr. Toad. He is attacked by the transfigured Medicine Woman and a pack of wolves. Philby and Willa later pass the real Sleepy Hollow, making her cringe at the memory of the Headless Horseman getting attacked.
- Hopper: Introduced in "The Insider", he and his grasshoppers try to kill Finn and Amanda in Paradise Pier during a World of Color performance. Unlike the film, he is the size of a dog and has mandibles the size of hedge trimmers. He is knocked away by the fountains. Hopper comes from A Bug's Life, Possibly coming from the It's Tough to Be a Bug attraction.
- Shere Khan: The second villain from The Jungle Book, he works with Si to attack Violet, Finn, and Willa.
- Si and Am: The Siamese cats from Lady and the Tramp that caused mischief for Lady to get blamed for. They work with Shere Khan and Scar to stop Violet, Finn, and Willa.
- Scar: Villain of The Lion King, he is Mufasa's brother and Simba's uncle and is mentioned by Violet as working with Am.
  - Shenzi, Banzai and Ed: The most recognised of The Lion King hyenas, the trio patrols Disneyland in "The Insider", after Tia Dalma damages the park with an earthquake.
  - Zira: Villainess of The Lion King II: Simba's Pride, Zira is near-religiously loyal to Scar. She and other Overtaker minions were after the Keepers, who used they DHI statis to launch earthquake debris at her.
  - Toy soldiers: Coming from The Santa Claus 2, these Overtakers follow Zira and attacked the Keepers, two of them were frozen by Elsa.
- Sabor: The vicious leopard from Tarzan. Seeing Sabor as a statue, Finn immediately had The Dillard keep an eye on the leopard while he investigated Tarzan's Tree house for clues. As he predicted, Sabor came to life and attacked, but Finn tricked the oversized cat into falling out of the tree house, where it reverted to being a statue.
- Queen of Hearts: The queen from Alice in Wonderland, who attacks Finn and Maybeck in "Disney Lands" after returning to the present with her card soldiers.
- Emperor Zurg: An Overtaker briefly seen in "Shell Game" as one of the many villains entering the Disney Dream.
- King Candy:
- Mother Gothel:
- Queen Narissa:
- The Firebird: Mentioned in "The Insider".
- Doctor Facilier: Mentioned in "The Insider".
- OTK's (Overtaker Kids, or Green Eyes): Kids who are put under a spell by the Overtakers to spy on and attack the Keepers outside the parks. In "Shell Game" Finn's mom is transformed into an OTA (Overtaker Adult) by Maleficent outside of Typhoon Lagoon. Tia Dalma and the Queen can do the same, or the reverse by releasing them. Originally, the OTKs wore contact lenses to identify each other, but magic one day changed their eye colors to green. Some of OTKs were promised a better Disney World by the Overtakers in exchange for their services instead of tricked; as a benefit, their natural strength and endurance are enhanced. In "The Syndrome", Luowski has taken up leadership of the group; they all retain their green eyes. In this story, Luowski is shown to have survived an unrestrained blast of telekinesis from Amanda and survive a fall out of a second-floor window.
  - Greg Luowski: Appears as a bully to Finn in "Disney in Shadow", but he is turned into an OTK by the Queen in "Power Play". He tried to kill Finn and the other DHI's several times, once by drugging Finn. He also tried to taser Maybeck but got Aunt Jelly instead. In "Dark Passage" he begins resisting the spell and warns Keepers; also, to his disgust, he had to gut a hyena for a flash drive. Maleficent zones him out as punishment until her death; when he barely regains consciousness, Greg warns of the war that takes place in "The Insider". In "The Syndrome", he appears to have either suffered a mental break down and thinks his memories of Maleficent are giving him orders, or the revived witch is too weak to make her voice strong enough in his mind to drown out his own conscience. He attempts killing the Keepers while they are in "The Syndrome", but he ends up being captured by Barracks 14, who wish to examine his enhanced abilities.
  - Hugo Montcliff: Dell Philby's (pre-Willa) best friend. Once an OTK, Hugo became suspicious of Philby's movements. He once found the Philby's cat, Elvis, and used returning him as an excuse to get into Philby's home. He tried to prevent Philby from returning the Keepers when the Queen and Cruella had them trapped in Epcot but was unsuccessful. He was later projected as a DHI to help the Queen and Cruella shut off the main power to Animal Kingdom to release their leaders from imprisonment.
  - Sally Ringwald: A girl that goes to same high school as Finn and Amanda. Amanda and Charlene attacked her to get answers about the Overtakers. Later caught by Mrs. Whitman when trying to drug Finn in his sleep with Greg's help, Sally was forced to act as a double act for the Keepers in exchange for not having her mother told of what she has done. She kept that promise throughout the cruise between "Shell Game" and "Dark Passage". She reappears in "The Syndrome", assisting Luowski with attempting to kill the Keepers while their DHIs are 60 years in the past, but she is pinned by Amanda's telekinesis.
  - Bishop Graham: Another of Philby's former friends, but it is unknown if this is actually Hugo under a nerd alias. The kid lives in his parents' basement and lives like a feudal lord. Due to his Green Eye powers, his mother is afraid of him. Amanda went with a picture from 1955, curious if he could enhance the fuzzy areas of the picture, but his allergies made him sneeze and dislodge the contacts hiding his eyes.
  - Robbie Barry: In "Shell Game" he alongside Greg Luwoski entered Crazy Glaze to taser Maybeck but ended up tasering Jelly.
  - Dixion: This Cast Member helped Greg to kill the Hyeena and later tried to capture Charlene and Willa backstage but got tied up instead.

Other Overtaker minions are:

- Big Bad Wolf: A bloodthirsty Overtaker who tries to eat Pluto, Finn, and Amanda in "Power Play". He and Pluto got in a dog fight. In the "Legacy of Secrets", he works with the little pigs to kill the Keepers after coming from the past.
- Country Bear Jamboree Bears: They are seen kidnapping Willa in "Disney at Dawn" after she falls asleep and bringing her to Maleficent. One is on an alternate cover of the book.
- Small World dolls: They are mindless assistants to the Overtakers. In "Disney After Dark" the Keepers look for clues on the ride It's a Small World; the dolls attack and bite the Keepers. They are only found in Disney World. The only way to make them harmless is to smile at them. Some are aged badly by one of the Queen's dropped potions in "The Insider".
- Crash Test Dummies (CTDs): These Overtakers are mentioned in "Disney in Shadow". They ride Segways and come after the Keepers in Epcot, which they guard. During business hours, some are actually Cast Members in disguise for security work.
- Gigabyte: This 20-foot-long python is mentioned in "Disney in Shadow". An Overtaker in Epcot that has escaped from the attraction, Honey I Shrunk the Audience, he is featured with Finn on his tail on the "Disney in Shadow" cover. He comes back in "Power Play" briefly with rattlesnakes.
- Dogs from Bambi: They chase Willa and Finn in Frontierland to the Indian teepees.
- Stormtroopers: Soldiers for the Empire in Star Wars. They were on patrol in Disneyland after the earthquake. They later appear in "Disney at Last", at first, they are four-foot toys but come alive due to a Fairly.
- Witch soldier: Hailing from Oz the Great and Powerful, this soldier carries a halberd with skill. He was left to guard the vault containing the pieces of Mickey's original sketch, but Philby destroyed him with his own weapon. More are briefly seen guarding Judge Doom who is in the crane.
- Sultan palace guards: From Aladdin, these guards are instead employed by the Overtakers instead of the Sultan or Jasmine. A group was amongst many Overtaker minions guarding Judge Doom.
- Thugees: Cloaked villains carrying curved blades. Maybeck faces them, using their lack of intelligence and fake warnings of concern to cause them to cut each other up. The Wraiths sucked the life out of the wounded Thugees.
- Medicine Woman: Introduced in "The Insider" as a mystic working for the Overtakers to eliminate the Keepers, she appears only in Frontierland. She can transfigure into a werewolf. She and other wolves attacked the Headless Horseman.
- Jack Sparrow: Attacks Finn during the Sail-Away show on the Disney Dream in "Shell Game". He almost hit him with a sword in the face. Most likely he is under a spell cast by the Queen or Maleficent, given he will not harm or kill without a good reason on his part.
- Jesters: The two court jesters attack Jess and Charlene while they are at Epcot's France Pavilion in "Disney in Shadow". One jester comes back in "Power Play". They only speak French, which only Jess can seem to translate. They most likely obey Frollo.
- Gargoyle: Comes alive in "Disney in Shadow", but Charlene destroys it after it attacks Jess and Willa.
- Vikings: This father and son duo escaped from Maelstrom and tried to attack Jess in the Mary Poppins Lounge at the Wonders of Life pavilion. The father speaks limited, heavily accented English.
- Cavemen: Another father and son duo they also attacked Jess at the Wonders of Life pavilion.
- Dinosaur Skeleton: Brought to life by Maleficent, it attacks Finn and Philby at Big Thunder Mountain Railroad in "Disney After Dark". It was reduced to nothing but a pile of bones after colliding with a wall.
- Trolls: They attack Charlene at the Wonders of Life pavilion in "Disney at Shadow", and later attack Charlene, Philby, and Finn in Maelstrom in "Power Play", ending up locked in a room on the ride.
- Stone Lions: They corner Charlene at the Wonders of Life pavilion. They came from the China part of Epcot and were trapped by the water sprinklers, because (being felines AKA "cats") they hate getting wet.
- Polar bears: They attack Maybeck and Philby on the Maelstrom in "Disney in Shadow".
- Rattlesnakes: They and Gigabyte chase Willa, Maybeck, and Finn in Epcot in "Power Play".
- Gnomes: They try to take Philby away from Maybeck on the Maelstrom in "Disney in Shadow".
- Dragon: Attacks Willa on the Kilimanjaro Safari in "Disney at Dawn". She believed it was a Komodo dragon; most likely Maleficent enchanted it.
- CPR dummies: They attack Finn at Typhoon Lagoon in "Shell Game", but are destroyed by Stitch.
- Doughboys: Attacking Finn and Willa in "Shell Game" with knives, they are sticky and able to rip anything that touches them. Willa defeats them with cooking oil and burns them.
- Jack Skellington: From The Nightmare Before Christmas, he appears in "Disney Lands" with Sally and Dapper Dan following Philby and Willa nearby Jingles. Unlike his film counterpart he does not speak so Sally interprets for him. He and Sally both seem to resemble puppets like in the film they are from. Jack and Sally try to stop the Keepers from going back in time. They are not part of the Overtakers.
- Sally: From The Nightmare Before Christmas, she appears in "Disney Lands" with Jack Skellington and Dapper Dan, following Philby and Willa nearby Jingles. They try to convince the Keepers from going back.
- Witch Hazel: One the first Overtakers brought to life by traveler.
- Lady Tremaine: One of the first Overtakers brought to life by Amery Hollingsworth.
- Louis: The alligator from The Princess and the Frog. In "Power Play", the group encounters a trio of villainous alligators, and the largest of which was said to resemble Louis. Whether or not this was a corrupted version of Louis himself was not specified.
- Honest John: Appears in "Shell Game" with Gideon trying to speed the Magic Kingdoms train off its foundation and kill Wayne, he is knocked off the train with Gideon by Finn.
- Gideon: Honest John's sidekick who helps John try to kill Wayne and keep Finn distracted, he is knocked off the speeding train by Finn in "Shell Game".
- Skeletons: In "The Insider", they attack the Keepers at Its a Small World and Tarzan's treehouse, they can be easily killed by knocking bones loose. They use chains as weapons.
- The Hag Queen: She appears in "The Insider" with the Evil Queen. She is the Evil Queen's hag form which tricked Snow white in eating the poisoned apple. She is ambushed by the seven dwarfs when they throw apples at the hag.
- Anastasia and Drizella: Cinderellas' stepsisters.
- Lucifer: The bad cat of lady Tremaine, appears on the front cover of "Disney at Last".
- Three Little Pigs: The Three Little Pigs from the Silly Symphony short, but unlike the short they work with the big bad wolf and serve the Overtakers. They appear to also be bigger and uglier than their cartoon counterparts.

=== Additional characters ===
==== Humans ====
- Mrs. Whitman: Finn Whitman's mother hates lying and is happy when her son brings a girl over for dinner; she is a rocket scientist who stopped working for NASA to raise her children. She is supportive of the Keepers and helps Finn and the rest many times, bailing Wanda out of jail, solving a cryptogram, providing transportation, and untying a barge in "Disney in Shadow". In "Shell Game", she becomes a Green Eye, but Finn attacks Tia Dalma and she takes the curse off of Mrs. Whitman. "The Insider" reveals being under the spell has let Mrs. Whitman with recurring headaches and focusing problems. The OTKs (Overtaker Kids) are also suffering from the same problems.
- Donald Whitman: Father of Finn Whitman, very strict, telling his son about getting good grades all the time. Like the rest of the Keepers' parents, he found out about the DHI crossing over in "Disney in Shadow" and is the angriest out of the parents when their child crosses-over; he believes the Keepers' mission to be nonsense taking Finn's attention away from his schoolwork. He has a harsh, hard-headed personality, and his interference could have led to the Overtakers' victory. Donald is also quite dense; Finn noted it would at least be a month until he noticed his wife's eyes had changed color. He actually bonded more with Finn over the time skip, trying to help him cope with Dillard's death.
- Finn's Sister: In "Disney After Dark", it is not confirmed he has a sister but in "Disney at Dawn" Amanda borrows his sister's DS in "Disney in Shadow". Finn asked where the rat (his nickname for her) is and said she was at Student Council. In "Shell Game" Finn says his mother loves his sister more than him. Other than this information, it is assumed she is a hard-working student at school, given her position as a member of the Student Council. She never plays a speaking role in the books and is only mentioned a few times.
- Dillard Cole: Finn's best friend, although Finn begins pushing him aside as he gets drawn further into his adventures as a DHI. Physically he is somewhat overweight. He always questions Finn's adventures, offering the logical explanation of a dream. He is not referred to whatsoever in "Disney at Dawn". He is mentioned once in "Disney in Shadow" although it mentions Finn does not see Dillard much anymore and for a while it seems that they might no longer be friends. In "Power Play" Dillard helps Finn and the rest of the Keepers on a mission at EPCOT. In "Shell Game", he appears on The Dream mysteriously helping Finn; he calls himself Finn's guardian angel. He is kidnapped by the Overtakers in "Dark Passage" when he was posing as Finn, where Tia Dalma tricks Finn into killing him as part of rebooting Chernabog. As an unintended side-effect of the Keeper's time traveling adventure in "The Return", Dillard is revived in a Pinocchio-esque fashion via the Dillard. Dillard has all the memories of his hologram's time with the Keepers but is annoyed he is three years younger than his best friend now.
  - The Dillard: After Dillard's death, his parents wanted to help Finn overcome his grief; as a result, they contacted the Cryptos, who used Dillard's image and the Coles' home movies to create a hologram. It had vague self-awareness and some of the original Dillard's personality and phrasing, but its speech was mostly clinical. It remains unable to understand sarcasm, insults or metaphors; Maybeck is usually the source of these. The Cryptos introduced it to Finn in "The Insider", explaining the purpose behind The Dillard's existence. It had mostly unlimited knowledge at its disposal that could be called up in an instant, due to being linked to the internet - "basically the new Philby" - and could also see through cameras in the park. During the Keepers' missions, it mostly served to calculate the success rates and the best strategems. A secret the Cryptoes kept from them is that The Dillard records everything it sees and hears, using the hologram to spy on them. They use this function to communicate with Joe after the earthquake.
- Gladis Philby: Philby's over-protective mother. Despite the paramedics explaining Philby is just sound asleep, she had him rushed to the hospital during "Disney in Shadow"; this nearly cost the Keepers their lives as Philby's became woozy from the fourth book. Later, she understands the importance of the Keepers' mission, after Philby pointed out that she was keeping him from acting out the good qualities she had been preaching for years. She gets captured by Luoswski in her own home, but breaks free; she lies to her husband, saying a gator had gotten into their house.
- Bessie ("Jelly") Maybeck: Protective of her nephew Terence, Bessie says she got her name due to an embarrassing incident with jelly doughnuts. She owns a pottery store called The Crazy Glaze. In "Shell Game" she gets attacked by Luowski with a gun taser which made Finn and Maybeck consider killing the OTKs; they figured it would put an end to their threat, despite how horribly wrong it is to take a life.
- Storey Ming: A college aged girl first appearing in "Shell Game" on The Dream. She helps Finn and the Keepers, and she somehow knows Wayne. In "The Insider", it is revealed that Storey went missing at sea a long time ago; ironically, she is a swim champ. Finn later discovers that Storey had in fact been saved by Ursula and used as a host by the sea witch to avoid suspicion. Once Ursula leaves her body, Storey regains her senses and swims Finn and Violet to safety, but she lacks any memory of the time Ursula had possessed her. Finn tricks Storey into thinking that it is a dream, leaving her in Club 33 to awake and call her family.
- Mattie Weaver: Appearing first in "Shell Game", she is a Fairly and is friends with Amanda and Jess. She is on The Dream helping Amanda watch the Keepers, but Finn thinks she is an Overtaker. She and Finn are properly meet in "Dark Passage". She is revealed to be able to "empathize" with any one she touches and see their thoughts. She hid out in the old church that served as Amanda and Jess's home before being sent to Mrs. Nash's. She later joins her friends under the protection of Disney. She later reappears in The Return series.
- Tim: Appearing only in "Shell Game", he is a mosquito killer that Maybeck met at Castaway Cay. He was the first to notice the Overtakers' attempted sabotage to the spray system, getting rid of the propane tanks attached to it. He does not know about the Overtakers and he and Maybeck are considered best friends.
- Mrs. Nash: First appearing in "Disney in Shadow" as the woman who runs the foster home Amanda and Jessica were sent to after the incident during "Disney at Dawn". She is very strict, not (in the narrative description) allowing anything fun in her home; she is also very terrible cook, with Amanda saying one of her dishes tastes like dog food. The girls Nash looks after can outsmart her when they work together; they got Finn out of her house without getting caught in "Power Play". She does not let her charges "stew", forcing them to be open about their emotions. Amanda, being paranoid, believes Nash may be working for the Fairlie facility as she has threatened to return them there, but Nash may have just used that to keep her and Jess in line. In "The Insider", Nash has been keeping Amanda and Jess past foster care age; the Crytos gave her a month to straight up her act and let the other girls go too, or they would report her. In "The Syndrome", Mrs. Nash is revealed to have been offered a reward for Amanda and Jess's location; they sourly noted that she would sell anyone out for $5.
- Sergio: The god that meets with the Keepers in "Dark Passage".
- Brad: Helped in the original green-screening in "Disney After Dark", he appears in "The Insider". He works with the Keepers, informing them of Overtaker activity and what decisions that have been made by the Cryptos. In contrast to Bob, Brad is warm and easy to work with.
- Bob: Older Cast Member introduced in "The Insider", he had the Keepers brought to Disneyland, and there by keeping them from graduation, due to fearing that they were becoming too powerful and might go rogue. Charlene spies on him and the other Cryptos and informs the Keepers; once they confront him about this, Brad comes to realise that he had acted too hasty and agrees to work with them without secrets.
- Brooke: A college girl introduced in "The Insider", who is a fan of the Keepers. She first meets Finn on a Keepers' secret mission, offering her phone to help him keep in contact with the others. Philby and Willa later contact her for the use of a college science lab, and a left to the nearest oil drilling area. Brooke's friend Austin joined them in the trip but remained unconvinced of the Overtakers' existence despite an attack by ravens led by Diablo.
- Austin: A college boy in love with Brooke. He offered to drive Philby and Willa to the nearest oil drilling station; they had found traces of oil where Tia Dalma stood in ToonTown. Unlike Brooke, Austin knows nothing of the Keepers and remains completely skeptical of their explanations, but an attack by Diablo seems to change his mind. Prior to this, he found one of Tia Dalma's voodoo dolls next to a drilling site, clueing the Keepers in to her plan to cause a destructive earthquake in Disneyland.
- Kenny Carlson: In "Shell Game" he first appeared at the meeting in Magic Kingdom. That night, he crossed over to help with the siege at the base where he joined up with Maybeck to defeat the Green Army Men. The next day, he was on board the Disney Dream. He was telling his roommate, Bart, that they were going to cross over and that they were only going to operate in the background.
- Bart: In "Shell Game" he was present at the meeting in Magic Kingdom with the other VKKs. He was later seen in his stateroom with Kenny Carlson on board the Disney Dream, where it was explained to him by Kenny that he was only there to operate in the background. In "Dark Passage" he helped keep an eye out for Greg Luwoski in Aruba after Mattie told Finn about who the VKKs on board were.
- Megan Fuchs: She is a Cast Member at DisneyQuest and is later the oldest VKK. In "Power Play" Megan was in charge of the Cyberspace Mountain simulator when Finn and Amanda entered it. When the machine went wild, Megan tried her best to get the two kids out of the machine, but it was not until Amanda used her levitation powers that the two got out alive. Megan then checked to see if they were ok. In "Shell Game" Megan became a VKK and is the oldest one. She was present at the meeting at the Columbia Harbour House.
- Barracks 14: An organization that kidnaps children gifted with unusual abilities. From Amanda and Jess's stories, the organization appears to have been working for the military to find a way to replicate and exploit their powers. During "The Syndrome", Barracks 14 managed to track down the three escaped Fairlies, but Joe managed to make them more interested in Luowoski, who was enchanted by the Overtakers; they took him in place of the Fairlies, unaware that each side had a plan to deal with them. "Legacy of Secrets" reveals that they backed the Overtakers in order to destroy Disney Parks. They now plot to use the Fairlies they still have captive to do the job now. It is also revealed that Amery Hollingsworth Jr. founded the group to continue to try and ruin Disney.
- Known Fairlies and workers for the barracks are:
  - Mary Ann: She is one of the girls from Barracks 14. She can lower the temperature around her cold enough to create ice on dry surfaces. In "Disney at Last" she is one of the two commanders of the Fairlies to lead the other Fairlies to attack Disneyland but she and the other Fairlies rebel against Hollingsworth and the Barracks 14 at the end of the book.
  - Jivarna: A Fairly who appears in "Disney at Last", she can shape shift into anything; to compensate for modesty if she has to change back away from her clothes, Barracks 14 provided her with underclothing that adapts to her forms. She used her abilities to scare visitors, appearing as a large spider in the lady's room. She appears at the end and is one of the Fairlie's to rebel against Barracks 14.
  - Minara: She is a Fairly who can control people's minds. She used her abilities to crash the steamboat into the Columbia ship. She later rebels against Barracks 14 along with the other Fairlie's.
  - Humphrey: He is a boy Fairly who can strengthen other Fairlie's powers, from touching or being in range of a mile of him.
  - Osanna: She is a Fairly with a currently unknown ability.
  - Shelby: She is a Fairly with incredible eyesight, able to see someone in great detail.
- Walt Disney: In "Legacy of Secrets" he is a character in the distance, and he does interact and meet with the five Keepers. When the Keepers venture out in the middle of the night to search Walt Disney's Carolwood Pacific model train in his backyard the Keepers hide from him. Walt Disney himself shows up, warned by Wayne, and has Hollingsworth and his accomplices thrown out of the park. He promises the Keepers that he will make sure the pen goes to the right place. Walt is the only character in the series that is real person.
- Amery Hollingsworth: An Imagineer hired by Walt Disney, but Amery grew obsessed with the occult and dark magic, stealing pictures or Disney Villains. Believing Walt to haven stolen his ideas for Maleficent, the Evil Queen and Lady Tremaine, Amery decided to ruin the company, but failed to the point of becoming penniless. He had three sons: Amery Jr., Rexx, and Ebsy. Junior continued his father's insanity, while his third Ebsy went to work for Disney to protect it from his family's insanity. Also, he is the Head of The Legacy of Secrets, or the Campaign of Darkness is the conspiracy of the Hollingsworth family to put an end the Disney Parks forever. It is the true reason that the Keepers had been formed, to combat a human threat back in the 1950s where it all began with Amery Hollingsworth, who hated Walt Disney for apparently taking credit for creating the Evil Queen, Maleficent and the Wicked Stepmother. He did whatever he could to cripple the Parks, eventually resorting to stealing the magic ink Disney owned and brought the villains to life with the goal of destroying the parks. However, Amery eventually committed suicide, but not before his son Junior was poisoned with his insanity. Junior spent years looking for a back-up plan, finding it in the Fairlies.
- Traveler: A witch doctor who lives in the Louisiana swamps who helps Amery Hollingsworth to help him create the Overtakers Disney villains. In exchange, the park would become the Traveler's "circle" for conducting his voodoo. It is stated that he might be the Devil, and Tia Dalma as his grim reaper.
- Joe Garlington: A head Imagineer, who rallies the Disney characters to their cause to help save Disneyland.
- Nick Perkins: In "Disney at Last" both he and Zeke (Ezekiel or Ebsy) Hollingsworth leads a strike with select characters to free Mattie.
- Zeke (Ezekiel or Ebsy) Hollingsworth: The third son of Amery Hollingsworth and brothers to Amery Jr., and Rexx. While his older brother continues with his father' insane plan, he went to work for Disney to protect it from his family's insanity. He eventually got a job as one of the Dapper Dan's and tried to keep the Keepers from time traveling, with the help of Jack Skellington and Sally. He later told Amanda Lockhart about his father's insanity, and that he knew of his brother's kidnapping of gifted children.
- Amery Hollingsworth Jr.: The oldest son to Amery Hollingsworth Sr. and brother to Rexx and Esby. After his father commits suicide, he continues with his father's legacy and his insane evil plan to destroy Disney with the Fairlies.
- Jeanie Pucket: Jess and Amanda's roommate and also Mrs. Nash's favorite and a tell-tale in "Disney in Shadow". In "Power Play" Jeanie becomes Jess's ally in protecting Amanda's state a secret from Mrs. Nash and Jeanie told Jess about the Lake Buena Vista Cogeneration Facility which Jess tells Philby about.
- Captain Peter Roseman: At the end of "Power Play" the Keepers, Ariel, Amanda and Jess realizing that a picture Jess drew earlier depicts as the Captain of the Disney Magic. He is friends with Ariel from The Little Mermaid.
- Tim Walters: A classmate of Amanda and Jess, and Jess's new boyfriend.
- Emily Fredrikson: One of Amanda and Jess's classmates, she is known as a fabric freak for being able to tell what clothes are made of. She created invisibility suits.

==== Disney characters ====
- Mickey Mouse: Leader of the good Disney Characters. Mickey had his original sketch torn apart and scattered to keep the Overtakers from finding it, leading to him vanishing. 40 years later, he is restored, but lacks the knowledge the other characters have; he would have just behaved like a character unless the Keepers were there to guide him. With his wand in hand, Mickey can restore any Disney Park to normal and summon characters when needed. He does not speak, but instead uses some kind of telepathy only the characters can hear. Violet translates for him to the Keepers. Mickey later speaks in The Return series.
- Minnie: Mickey's love interest and de facto leader of the good Disney Characters in his absence. She often appears as an ally of the Keepers. In "Power Play" she helps Amanda and Finn get to Tom Sawyer Island. Minnie gets upset when Finn asks of Mickey Mouse's whereabouts in "Power Play". She never speaks, but all the characters hear her and Mickey through some kind of telepathy. Violet translates for her to the Keepers.
- Pluto: He helps Amanda and Finn once they are on Tom Sawyer Island by standing guard and defending them from alligators and the Big Bad Wolf in "Power Play". He appears again in "Dark Passage".
- Ariel: Her first appearance was in "Power Play" when she helps Willa. She teams up with the Keepers in "Power Play". She is also friends with Captain Peter from the Disney Magic Cruise ship. She changes into a human on dry land, seemingly without the use of any magic. The Keepers trusted Ariel with the return switch for when they need to leave the Park, leaving anywhere risked the Overtakers stealing it. She uses the characters names for the Keepers (i.e., Willa "Willow", and Charlene "Shirly").
- Stitch: He first appeared in "Disney in Shadow", chasing Finn and Maybeck away from Tom Sawyer Island with the pirates allied with the Overtakers; he pins Finn, telling him "You shouldn't be here". However, once Finn says he liked him and how his sister thought Stitch was cute, Stitch is stunned, allowing Finn to flee. He reappears in "Shell Game" destroying CPR dummies in Typhoon Lagoon to let Finn reach the wave pool. This could imply he is a double agent working for the Good Characters by infiltrating the Overtakers. He later appears in "Disney at Last" among many other Disney Heroes who were gathered by Joe Garlington.
- Donald Duck: Mentioned in "Disney After Dark" by one of the Keepers in terms of different types of Disney Characters.
- Mulan: She helps the Keepers escape from Shan-Yu and the park security in the "Power Play". She taunts Finn when he asks if she is the real Mulan or a Cast Member, by asking if it was Cast Members chasing the Keepers. She appears with Kristoff in "Disney at Last" trying to capture the Fairlies. She appears to have a bit of a rivalry with Kristoff, when grabbing Nick's arm to come with either of them.
- Lilo: Mentioned in "Shell Game" by one of the park employees allied with the Keepers, she informed said employee to give Finn a surfboard and to leave afterwards. She never mentions Stitch.
- King Triton: In "Shell Game", he gives Finn a code ("Starfish wise starfish cries") at Typhoon Lagoon. In "The Insider", he saves Storey Ming (Ursula) from wraiths. His code later gives Finn back his sword, which helps defeat Ursula and save the real Storey.
- Megara: She appears in "Dark Passage" because she was brought to Amanda and Jess by Ariel. She has the power to heal wounds, seen when she heals the hyena bite Jess suffered on the Dream. In "The Insider" she heals Finn's DHI after he barely survives killing Chernabog.
- Timon and Pumbaa: They appear in "The Insider" to help the Keepers battle Jafar and Iago in Disneyland Park's Adventureland. They are the Meerkat and Warthog duo from The Lion King. Unlike other animal characters, this duo retained their ability to speak like in the film.
- Violet: She assists the Keepers during the final battle in "The Insider", teaming up with Finn constantly as her invisibility powers proved useful for scouting and sneak attacks. She assisted with defeating Ursula and recovering the final piece of Mickey's picture.
- Princess Aurora:
- Prince Phillip: A character from Sleeping Beauty who slayed Maleficent in the film. Believing that the Keepers were mounting an attack on the Dark Ones (Overtakers), he led the carousel knights into battle, but the earthquake caused by Tia Dalma forced a retreat.
- Elsa: She assists the Keepers during the final battle in "The Insider". The Snow Queen from Frozen, Elsa was asked to slow the storm approaching the park that the Overtakers were going to use to ignite natural gas flooding it.
- Rapunzel: She assists the Keepers during the final battle in "The Insider". She is shown to have healing powers, as in the film Tangled. She heals Violet after her force field accidentally drops debris on her, and Finn's DHI after he barely survives killing Chernabog.
- Remy assists the Keepers along with his father, Django. In "The Insider", much of his clan was aged by a potion of the Evil Queen's; the appearances of his clan vary, from blue ribbon beauties to ratty-looking rodents. Remy along with a dozen other rats are seen in "Disney at Last" at a gathering of Disney characters.
- Chip and Dale: Finn sees them when he first arrives the Magic Kingdom as his DHI.
- Winnie the Pooh: Finn sees him walking with Piglet during his first visits to the Magic Kingdom as his DHI.
- Piglet: Finn sees him walking with Winnie the Pooh during his first visits to the Magic Kingdom as his DHI.
- Tom Sawyer: Finn sees him walk into Cinderella Castle during his first visits to the Magic Kingdom as his DHI. The fort of his island was once used by the Overtakers as a hideout.
- Goofy: Finn sees him when he first arrives the Magic Kingdom as his DHI. In "The Insider", he helps comfort Minnie when Mickey is revived by the Keepers.
- Tigger: Mentioned by a security guard in "Disney in Shadow" to have been seen spying on Ursula. He is then seen in "Dark Passage" with Megara and Pluto. He also seen again in "Disney at Last", where he accidentally scares Joe.
- Mr. Potato Head: Mentioned in "Disney in Shadow" by security guards. They say that he likes to "mess around" backstage.
- Rajah: Princess Jasmine's pet tiger, from Aladdin, Rajah assists Maybeck and Finn in fighting Jafar in his cobra form.
- Dumbo: Flies Rapunzel and Megara to the top of the Matterhorn to save Finn.
- Bagheera: The panther who looked after Mowgli in The Jungle Book; he, along with Tramp and Violet were stationed at Walt's apartment.
- Tramp: The male canine protagonist in Lady and the Tramp. He assisted Violet and Bagheera with distracting the Overtakers pinning the Keepers in Walt's apartment.
- Django: In "The Insider" he helps both the Keepers and his son Remy because much of the clan was aged by a potion of the Evil Queen's; the appearances of his clan vary, from blue ribbon beauties to ratty-looking rodents.
- Bert: Appears in '"The Insider", he is ambushed by wraiths and demons by hologram Wayne.
- Mary Poppins: Appearing in "Disney at Last", she along with Peter Pan and the Fairy Godmother went around Disneyland to gather the heroes.
- Mad Hatter:
- Fairy Godmother: Appears in "Disney at Last" where she helps gather Disney Heroes.
- Cinderella:
- Peter Pan: Appearing in "Disney at Last", he helps gather the Disney Heroes with Mary Poppins, and the Fairy Godmother.
- Tinker Bell:
- Tiger Lily: Appears in "Disney at Last" with the other Disney heroes.
- Pocahontas: Appears in "Disney at Last" with the other Disney Heroes against the Fairlie's.
- Eugene "Flynn Rider" Fitzherbert: Appearing in "Disney at Last", he helps Nick fight the Fairlies. He is described to have more facial hair than in the film.
- Nani Pelekai: One of the many good characters to appear in "Disney at Last". She is one of the many Heroes helping Nick fight the Fairlies.
- Anna: Appears in "Disney at Last" with Kristoff with the other Disney characters against the Fairlie's.
- Kristoff: Appears in "Disney at Last" with Anna and the other Disney characters led by Dash. He is shown to have a competition with Mulan when grabbing Nick's arm.
- Snow White:
- The Seven Dwarfs: These heroes helped the Keepers against the evil queen and her hag form.
- Ewoks: Appearing, in "Disney at Last", they are seen talking to other heroes.
- Dash Parr: Appeared in "Disney at Last" leading a group of Disney heroes against the Fairlie's.
- Flik: One of the many Heroes seen at The Gathering.
- Tiana:
- James Patrick "Sulley" Sullivan: One of the many Disney heroes seen in The Gathering.
- Aladdin:
- Olaf:
- Sven:
- Princess Jasmine:
- Hercules:
- Pinocchio: One of the Heroes seen in The Gathering.
- Han Solo:
- Iron Man:
- Spider-Man:
- Daisy Duck:
