= Gusher =

Gusher may refer to:

- Blowout (well drilling), the uncontrolled release of crude oil and/or natural gas from a well
- Crush 'n' Gusher, a water coaster in Disney's Typhoon Lagoon on the Walt Disney World Resort property
- Fruit Gushers, a Betty Crocker-branded fruit snack
- Lakeview Gusher, an eruption of hydrocarbons from a pressurized oil well in the Midway-Sunset Oil Field in Kern County, California
- Gusher of Lies, a book by Robert Bryce
- Gusher Marathon, an annual spring marathon held in Beaumont, Texas
- Slush Gusher, a body slide attraction at Disney's Blizzard Beach

== See also ==
- Gush (disambiguation)
