= Spert =

Spert or SPERT may refer to:

- Thomas Spert (died 1547), English vice admiral in service to King Henry VIII
- Robert Spert, English Member of Parliament for New Shoreham in 1460
- Spert Island, Palmer Archipelago, Antarctica, named after Thomas Spert
- Spert, a subdivision (frazioni) of the comune of Farra d'Alpago, Italy
- Special Power Excursion Reactor Test Program, a series of tests on the safety of nuclear reactors commissioned by the US Atomic Energy Commission in 1954

== See also ==
- Spurt (disambiguation)
