= USS Ripple (ID-2439) =

Minesweeper of the United States Navy

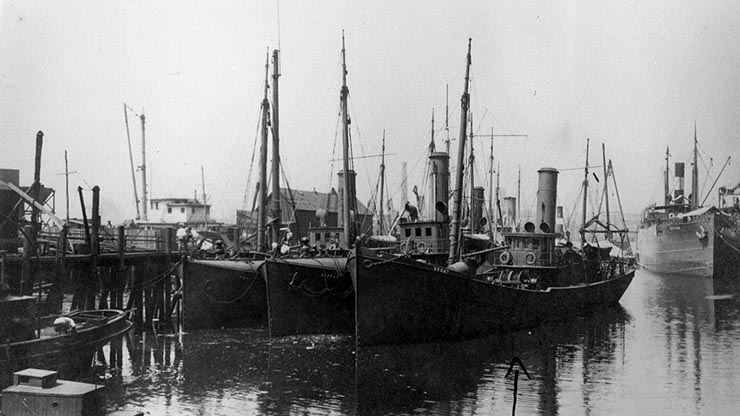
- Fishing trawlers Foam (left), Ripple (center), and Spray (right), probably prior to their U.S. Navy service as naval trawlers and minesweepers USS Foam (ID-2496), USS Ripple (ID-2439), and USS Spray (ID-2491).

History

United States
- Name: USS Ripple
- Namesake: Ripple, a small wave (previous name retained)
- Builder: Fore River Shipbuilding Company, Quincy, Massachusetts
- Launched: 20 November 1910
- Acquired: 29 May 1918
- Commissioned: 6 August 1918
- Decommissioned: 11 February 1919
- Fate: Returned to owner 11 February 1919
- Notes: Served as commercial fishing trawler Ripple 1911-1917, as Imperial Russian Navy trawler T44 1917-1918 (inactive), and as commercial trawler until 1949

General characteristics
- Type: Naval trawler (minesweeper)
- Tonnage: 244 Gross register tons
- Displacement: 457 tons
- Length: 114 ft 4 in (34.85 m) registered
- Beam: 22 ft 6 in (6.86 m)
- Draft: 11 ft 7 in (3.53 m) mean
- Sail plan: Steam engine
- Speed: 11 knots
- Complement: 22
- Armament: 2 × 3-pounder guns

The second USS Ripple (ID-2439) was a United States Navy trawler which served as a minesweeper and was in commission from 1918 to 1919.

Ripple was built as a civilian steel-hulled fishing trawler by the Fore River Shipbuilding Company at Quincy, Massachusetts, for the Bay State Fishing Company of Boston, Massachusetts, and was launched on 20 November 1910. In 1917, the Russian Empire purchased Ripple and the trawlers Foam and Spray from Bay State Fishing, intending to place them in Imperial Russian Navy service during World War I. The Russians gave Ripple a new name, T44, but the outbreak of the Russian Revolution in 1917 prevented the three ships from leaving the United States.

On 29 May 1918, the U.S. Navy chartered all three ships from the Russian Government for World War I use. T44 was assigned Identification Number (Id. No.) 2491, placed under the control of the Commandant, 3rd Naval District, and, reverting to her commercial name, was commissioned at Tebo's Yacht Basin in New York City on 6 August 1918 as USS Ripple (ID-2491).

Outfitted as a minesweeper, Ripple was assigned to the 3rd Naval District and based at Base No. 8 at Tompkinsville on Staten Island, New York. She operated on patrol and minesweeping duties off the Ambrose Light Vessel and Fire Island Light Vessel into 1919.

On 1 January 1919, Ripple joined the tug USS Resolute (SP-1309) and the submarine chasers USS SC-55 and USS SC-293 in assisting the troop transport USS Northern Pacific, which had run aground off Fire Island, New York, that day. Northern Pacific was refloated on 18 January 1919, and salvage operations were completed on 21 January 1919.

Ripple was decommissioned on 11 February 1919 at the New York Navy Yard in Brooklyn, New York, and returned to representatives of the by-then-exiled Imperial Russian government. That government having been deposed in 1917, she was sold locally, and operated as a commercial fishing trawler out of Boston until being scrapped in 1949.
