= USS Foam =

Minesweeper of the United States Navy

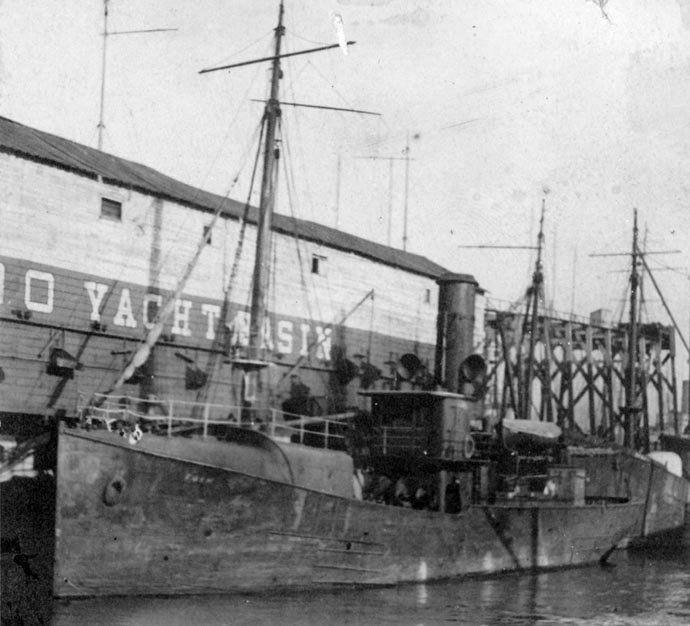
- Foam prior to her U.S. Navy service, probably in the Tebo Yacht Basin at New York City. This photograph probably was taken on 11 March 1918 when Foam was inspected by the 3rd Naval District for possible U.S. Navy acquisition.

History

United States
- Name: USS Foam
- Namesake: Previous name retained
- Builder: Fore River Shipbuilding Company, Quincy, Massachusetts
- Completed: 1910
- Acquired: 29 May 1918
- Commissioned: 1 June 1918
- Fate: Returned to owner 3 March 1919
- Notes: Served as civilian fishing trawler Foam 1910–1917

General characteristics
- Type: Naval trawler (minesweeper)
- Tonnage: 244 Gross register tons
- Sail plan: Steam engine

USS Foam (ID-2496) was a United States Navy trawler which served as a minesweeper and was in commission from 1918 to 1919.

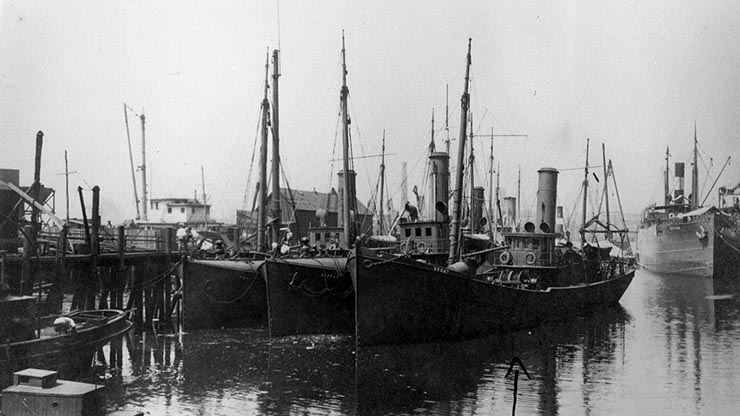
Fishing trawlers Foam (left), Ripple (center), and Spray (right), probably prior to their U.S. Navy service as naval trawlers and minesweepers USS Foam (ID-2496), USS Ripple (ID-2439), and USS Spray (ID-2491).

Foam was built as a civilian fishing trawler in 1910 by the Fore River Shipbuilding Company at Quincy, Massachusetts. In 1917, the Russian Empire purchased Foam and the trawlers Ripple and Spray from the Bay State Fishing Company of Boston, Massachusetts, intending to place them in Imperial Russian Navy service during World War I, but the outbreak of the Russian Revolution that year prevented the three ships from leaving the United States.

The U.S. Navy's 3rd Naval District inspected Foam on 11 March 1918 for possible service. On 29 May 1918, the U.S. Navy chartered all three ships from the Russian Government for World War I use. Foam was assigned Identification Number (Id. No.) 2496, placed under the control of the Commandant, 3rd Naval District, and commissioned on 1 June 1918 as USS Foam (ID-2496).

Foam operated in the 3rd Naval District for the remainder of World War I and into the months immediately following the end of the war, engaged in minesweeping duties off of New York City.

Foam was decommissioned in 1919 and returned to the Russian government on 3 March 1919.
