= Squirt =

Squirt or squirting may refer to:

== Animals ==
- Sea squirt, a marine animal

== Arts and entertainment ==
- Squirt, a comic strip in the Funday Times
- "Squirt" (Fluke song), by Fluke
- Squirt (TV series), a New Zealand children's television series
- Squirt TV, a public-access television cable TV channel
- Squirtle, a Pokémon character
- Squirt (Camp Lakebottom), a character from the animated television series Camp Lakebottom
- Squirt, a baby sea turtle from the animated film Finding Nemo
- Squirt, a character in the animated television series Miss Spider's Sunny Patch Friends

== Products ==
- Squirt (soft drink), a citrus-flavored soda
- Squirt (Pillow Pal), a plush elephant toy made by Ty
- Squirt, a pocket knife made by Leatherman
- Squirting, an unofficial term for Wireless Zune-to-Zune sharing

== Science, health and medicine ==
- A spray or jet of fluid
- Squirt, a slang term for female ejaculation
- SQuiRTs, the Screening Quick Reference Tables for pollutants, published by the US National Ocean Service's Assessment and Restoration Division

== Sports and games ==
- Squirt (horse) (foaled 1732), a Thoroughbred racehorse, grandsire of Eclipse
- Deflection, in billiard and related games
- Squirt division, in minor ice hockey, a level of play in North America for children aged 10 and under
- Squirt boating, a form of whitewater kayaking

== Other ==
- Squirt, slang for a person of short stature (often a child), or a small thing
- Humorous pronunciation of the sqrt (square root) function in various programming languages
- Squirt.org, a cruising/hookup site for gay and bisexual men

== See also ==
- Spray (disambiguation)
- Spurt (disambiguation)
