= Crush 'n' Gusher =

Water slide at Typhoon Lagoon

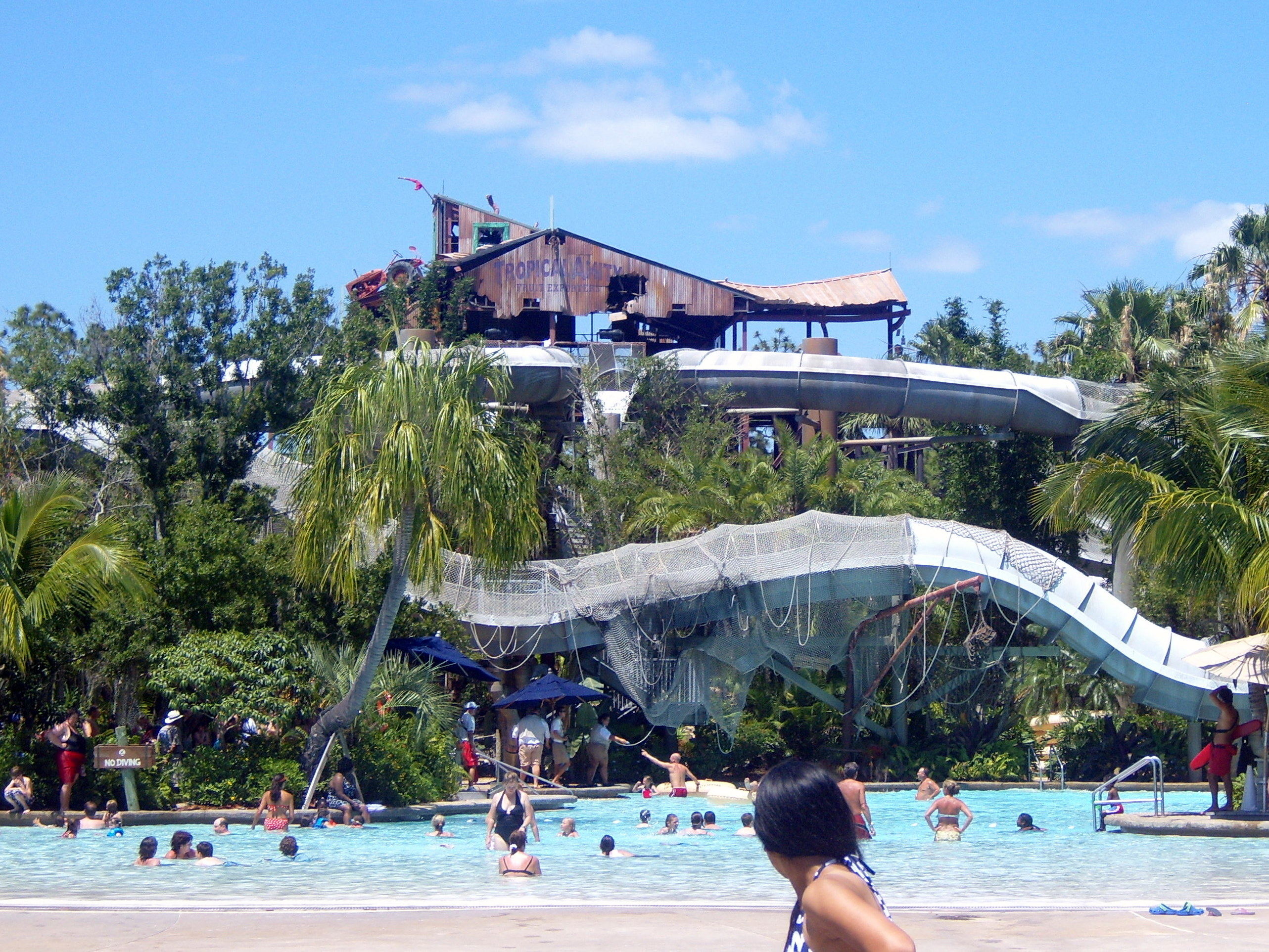

Disney's Typhoon Lagoon
- Coordinates: 28.3666792°N 81.5279432°W
- Status: Operating
- Opening date: March 15, 2005

General statistics
- Designer: Walt Disney Imagineering
- Model: Water Coaster
- Length: 410–420 ft (120–130 m)
- Height restriction: 48 in (122 cm)
- Sponsor: Chiquita
- Must transfer from wheelchair

Crush 'N' Gusher is a water coaster in Disney's Typhoon Lagoon on the Walt Disney World Resort property.

This ride was the first water coaster to be built for a Disney water park. Themed as an abandoned and dilapidated fruit process center, guests may slide down three different slides: the "Banana Blaster", "Coconut Crusher", or "Pineapple Plunger". These slides range from 410 to 420 feet (130 m) in length, but all send riders to a plunge into the "Hideaway Bay" pool.

== Development ==
Specifics pertaining to mark Crush 'N' Gusher were announced by Disney officials by December 2004. As Patrick Brennan of Walt Disney Imagineering and lead creative designer of the attraction explained, the Crush 'N' Gusher would utilize "some of the latest water ride innovations in the industry today." He also explained, "When completed, Crush 'N' Gusher at Disney's Typhoon Lagoon Water Park will be the only water coaster thrill ride of its kind in Central Florida".

The Crush 'N' Gusher opened officially on March 15, 2005.

== Attraction description ==
After riders ascend a dilapidated structure seemingly through a dense tropical forest, riders are sent down one of the three Crush 'N' Gusher slides, which all return to the Hideaway Bay pool in different paths consisting of uphill and downhill tunnels, turns, curves, and the like. Guests travel upon inflatable rafts decorated with tropical fruits, reflecting Disney's theme of a journey through an abandoned tropical fruit processing plant. Fun facts about bananas and pineapples are located on signs adjacent to the ride's queue. The ride is sponsored by Chiquita. The ride is also one of the only waterslides in North America to feature three-person inline slide tubes.

== Statistics ==
- One slide can fill a regular home pool in a minute.
- The Crush 'n' Gusher can fill the 2.7-million-US-gallon (10,000 m^{3}) wave pool in about 3 hours
- The water jets put out 1,360 US gallons (5.1 m^{3}) a minute and 9 million US gallons (34,000 m^{3}) every 12 and a half hours
