= Spray II (SP-308) =

Proposed patrol vessel of the United States Navy

History

United States
- Name: USS Spray II (proposed)
- Namesake: Previous name retained (proposed)
- Builder: Charles L. Seabury and Company, Morris Heights, the Bronx, New York
- Completed: 1911
- Acquired: Never
- Stricken: Late 1918
- Fate: Never taken over for U.S. Navy service
- Notes: Served as civilian motorboat Spray II

General characteristics
- Type: Patrol vessel (proposed)
- Tonnage: 41 tons
- Length: 65 ft 0 in (19.81 m)
- Beam: 12 ft 6 in (3.81 m)
- Draft: 4 ft 0 in (1.22 m) mean
- Speed: 8.6 knots
- Complement: 5 (proposed)
- Armament: 1 × 3-pounder gun (proposed); 2 × machine guns (proposed)

USS Spray II (SP-308) was the proposed name and designation for a United States Navy World War I patrol vessel that the Navy never actually took over.

Spray II was built as a wooden-hulled civilian launch in 1911 by Charles L. Seabury and Company at Morris Heights in the Bronx, New York. On 9 May 1917, she was ordered delivered to the U.S. Navy for World War I section patrol duty, but the Navy never actually took control of her and she remained in civilian hands.

Spray II was stricken from the Navy List in late 1918.

Spray II should not be confused with USS Spray (ID-2491), a naval trawler and minesweeper in commission from 1918 to 1919.
