= USS Spray =

Minesweeper of the United States Navy

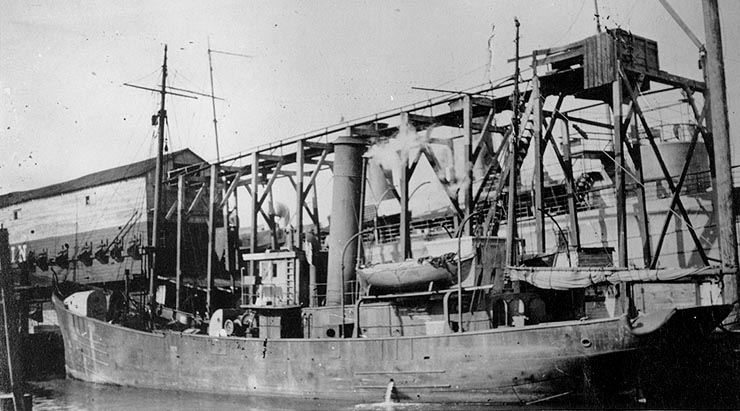
- Spray, probably prior to her U.S. Navy service.

History

United States
- Name: USS Spray
- Namesake: Previous name retained
- Builder: Fore River Shipbuilding Company, Quincy, Massachusetts
- Completed: 1905
- Acquired: 29 May 1918
- Commissioned: 1 June 1918
- Fate: Returned to owner 4 March 1919
- Notes: Served as civilian fishing trawler Spray 1905-1917

General characteristics
- Type: Naval trawler (minesweeper)
- Tonnage: 283 Gross register tons
- Displacement: 500 tons
- Length: 126 ft 6 in (38.56 m)
- Beam: 22 ft (6.7 m)
- Draft: 10 ft 6 in (3.20 m) mean
- Sail plan: Steam engine
- Speed: 11 knots
- Complement: 27
- Armament: 1 × 6-pounder gun; 2 × machine guns

USS Spray (ID-2491) was a United States Navy trawler which served as a minesweeper and was in commission from 1918 to 1919.

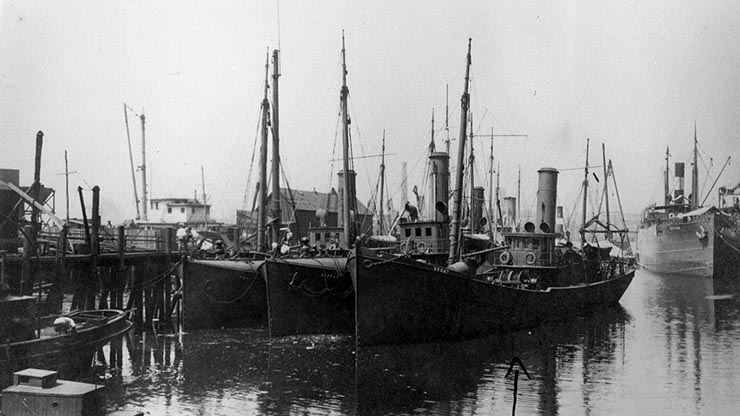
Fishing trawlers Foam (left), Ripple (center), and Spray (right), probably prior to their U.S. Navy service as naval trawlers and minesweepers USS Foam (ID-2496), USS Ripple (ID-2439), and USS Spray (ID-2491).

Spray was built as a civilian fishing trawler in 1905 by the Fore River Shipbuilding Company at Quincy, Massachusetts. In 1917, the Russian Empire purchased Spray and the trawlers Foam and Ripple from the Bay State Fishing Company of Boston, Massachusetts, intending to place them in Imperial Russian Navy service during World War I, but the outbreak of the Russian Revolution that year prevented the three ships from leaving the United States.

On 29 May 1918, the U.S. Navy chartered all three ships from the Russian Government for World War I use. Spray was assigned Identification Number (Id. No.) 2491, placed under the control of the Commandant, 3rd Naval District, and commissioned on 1 June 1918 as USS Spray (ID-2491).

Spray operated in the 3rd Naval District for the remainder of World War I and into the months immediately following the end of the war, engaged in minesweeping duties off of New York City.

Spray was decommissioned in 1919 and returned to the Russian government on 4 March 1919.

Spray should not be confused with USS Spray II (SP-308), a motorboat ordered delivered to the U.S. Navy in 1917 for use as a patrol vessel but which the Navy never took over.
