= Disney's Typhoon Lagoon =

Water park at Walt Disney World

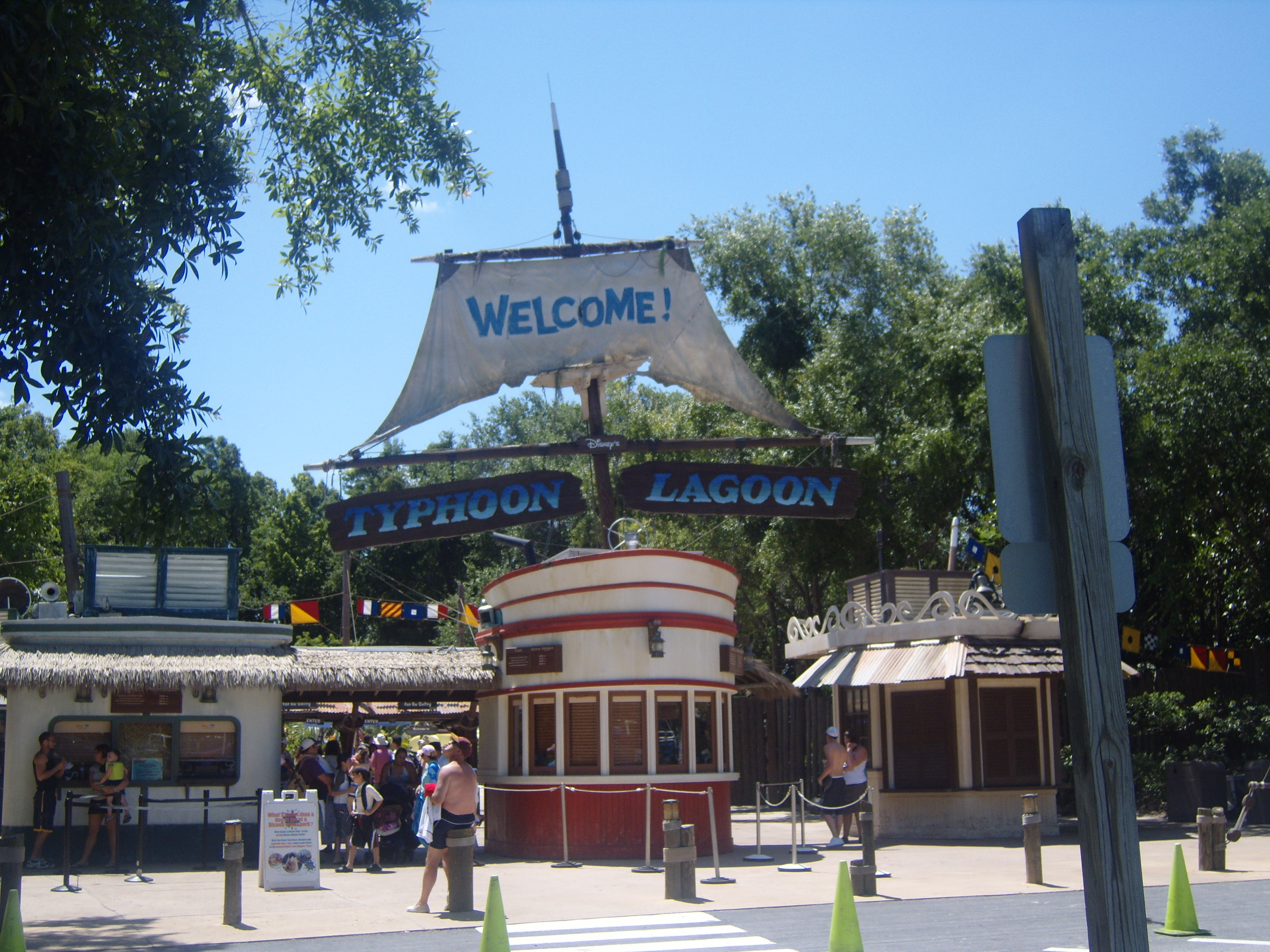
- Typhoon Lagoon Entrance
- Interactive map of Disney's Typhoon Lagoon
- Location: Walt Disney World Resort, Lake Buena Vista, Florida, United States
- Coordinates: 28.365025°N 81.527772°W
- Status: Operating
- Opened: June 1, 1989; 37 years ago
- Owner: Disney Experiences (The Walt Disney Company)
- Operated by: Walt Disney World
- Theme: Storm-ravaged tropical bay
- Operating season: Year-round with annual maintenance closure (water is heated in the winter)
- Website: Official website

Disney's Typhoon Lagoon is a water theme park located at the Walt Disney World Resort in Lake Buena Vista, Florida, near Orlando, and is one of two operating water parks at the resort. It is the second water park to open at the resort, preceded by Disney's River Country which closed in November 2001.

The park, which opened on June 1, 1989, is home to one of the world's largest outdoor wave pools where it is even possible to bodysurf. The theme of the park is the "Disney legend" of a typhoon that wreaked havoc upon a formerly pristine tropical paradise. Ships, fishing gear, and surfboards are strewn about where the storm flung them. Its centerpiece is "Miss Tilly", a shrimp boat impaled upon a mountain named "Mount Mayday" that erupts a 50-foot (15 m) geyser of water every half hour, right before the bells of the watch sound on it. Its mascot is "Lagoona Gator".

Typhoon reclaimed the title of most popular water park in the world in 2022, admitting 1.92 million guests, by beating Chimelong's (China) 1.62 million, Volcano Bay's (Florida) 1.85 million, Thermas Dos Laranjas' (Brazil) 1.7 million, and Therme Erding's (Germany) 1.7 million. Prior to 2020, Chimelong and Typhoon Lagoon had taken the top 2 spots for years, annually averaging 2.66 million and 2.25 million, respectively.

The park operates year-round, with an annual maintenance closure during either the fall or winter. During the closure, its sister park, Blizzard Beach, remains open. From 2020 until 2025, Disney operated only one water park at a time, including during the summer. Of the major parks at Disney World, it is the only one that lies within the city limits of Lake Buena Vista.

The water park, along with all the other Walt Disney World parks, closed in March 2020 due to the ongoing COVID-19 pandemic. The park remained closed whilst the four theme parks reopened July 11–15, 2020. Disney's Typhoon Lagoon reopened at the Walt Disney World Resort on January 2, 2022, after being closed almost two years due to the COVID-19 pandemic. It was the last portion of the resort to reopen after COVID-19 related interruptions.

== Mount Mayday ==
Mount Mayday, located behind the surf pool, features "Miss Tilly" as well as many of the waterfalls and slides. It is a man-made mountain which not only provides launching areas for the water slides but also conceals the pipework.

The main engineering works performed in 1988 and 1989 featured studies, design, and tests on water wave generation and propagation. As the Typhoon Lagoon was one of the first wave-makers applied to a theme park, one of its prime objectives was to produce surfable waves. Waves are generated by a 12-cell prestressed concrete tank in the background of the lagoon covered with the shipwreck scene. Computer modeling techniques were used at the time to study fluid-structure interaction, stress concentrations, and fatigue to ensure integrity and safety. Prior to its opening, the Typhoon Lagoon was tested to determine wave shape, surf-board ride duration, and the extent to which the waves give a natural feeling as they propagate and break on the artificial beach downstream.

=== Attractions ===
- Humunga Kowabunga: Three enclosed "speed slide" flumes that send riders downward five stories in seconds reaching speeds of 39 mph (Height Restriction: 48" or taller).
- Storm Slides: Three body slides (Jib Jammer, Stern Burner, and Rudder Buster) that send riders from a height of three stories down twisting, winding channels to a splash pool at the bottom.
- Gang Plank Falls: Family raft ride featuring large four-person inner tubes.
- Mayday Falls: Tube slide flume with winding "rough rapids" feel.
- Keelhaul Falls: Tube slide flume with a smoother ride, spiraling down through a waterfall and cave.
- Forgotten Grotto: A cave walkway through Mt. Mayday
- Overlook Pass: A walkway across the slope of Mt. Mayday, with small waterfalls.

== Hideaway Bay ==
Hideaway Bay, formerly "Out of the Way Cay", is a sandy beach area located behind the dressing rooms.

=== Attractions ===
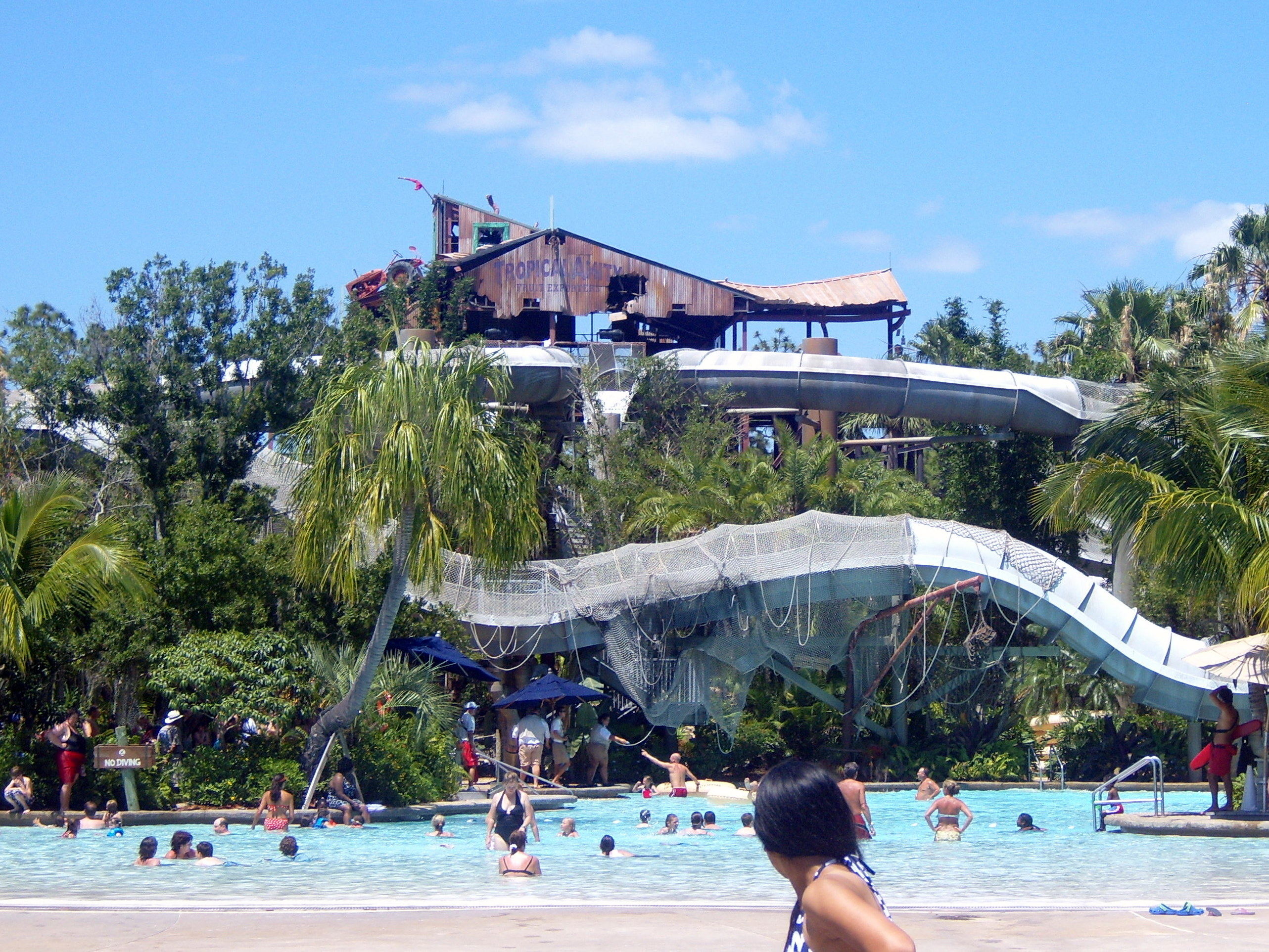
Crush 'n' Gusher

- Crush 'n' Gusher: Water coaster where one to two-person rafts are propelled by water jets through hairpin turns and drop-offs. This attraction includes a choice of the water coaster slide "Banana Blaster", "Coconut Crusher", or "Pineapple Plunger" (Height Restriction: 48" or taller).
- Miss Adventure Falls: In June 2016, Disney filed plans to build a family raft ride adjacent to Crush 'n' Gusher. The family raft ride is highly themed and starts out with a large conveyor belt that takes riders, inside their rafts, to the top before descending.
- Sandy White Beach: Beach area with lounge chairs as well as a wading pool area adjacent to Crush 'n' Gusher.

== Typhoon Lagoon ==
The largest section of the park houses the feature attraction as well as many shaded, white sandy beaches to relax and recuperate.

=== Attractions ===
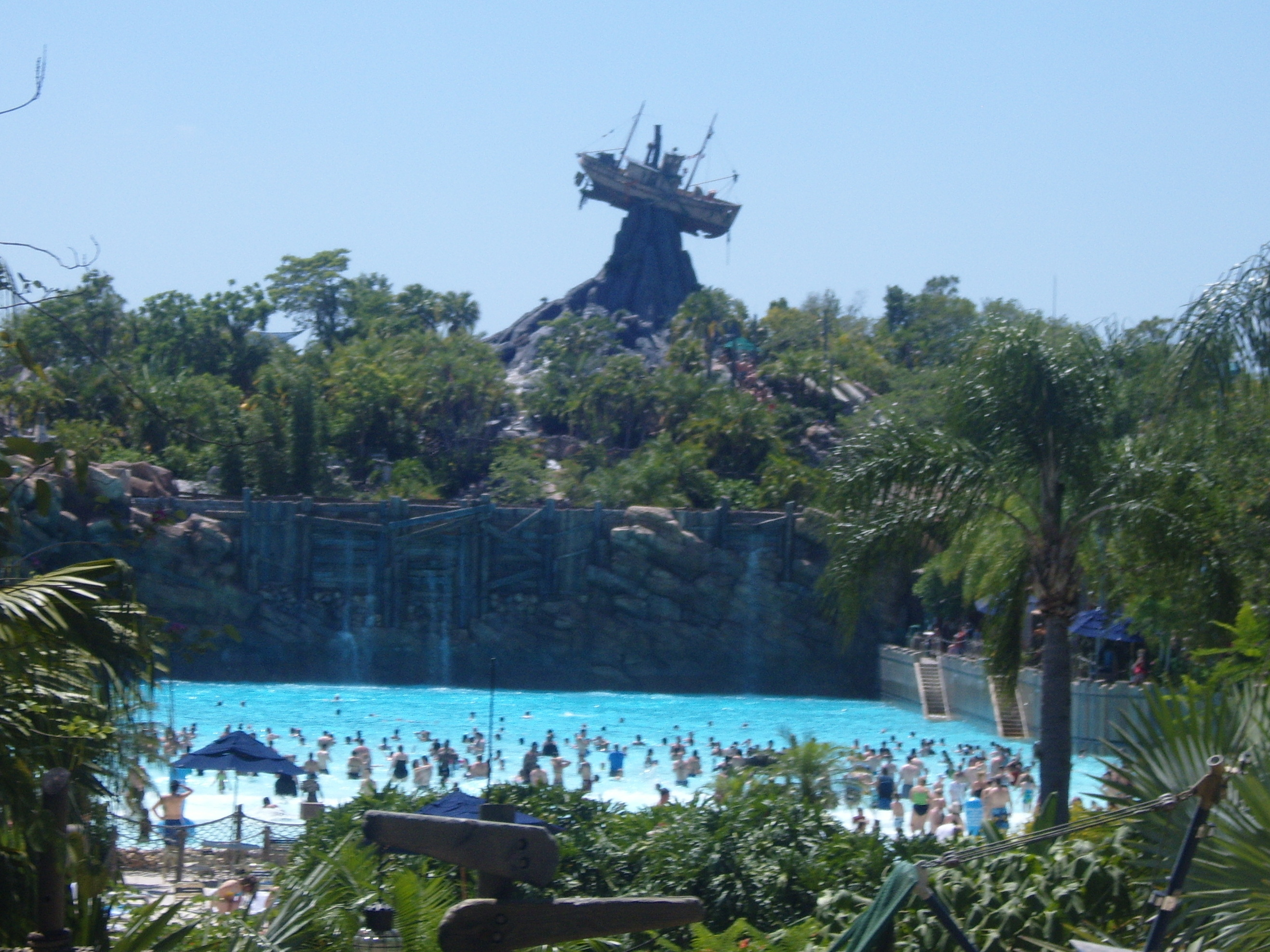
Typhoon Lagoon Surf Pool

- Typhoon Lagoon Surf Pool: Wave pool, which has 6 foot high waves every 110 seconds.
- Bay Slides: Beginner slide designed to send toddlers down gentle slopes that end in a secluded corner for the "Surf Pool".
- Blustery Bay: Zero depth entry tidal pool near the clock tower, adjacent to the "Surf Pool" and is surrounded by sandy beaches.
- Whitecap Cove: Zero depth entry tidal pool near "Surf Doggies", adjacent to the "Surf Pool" and is surrounded by sandy beaches.
- Learn to Surf: Hosted by "Craig Carroll's Cocoa Beach Surf School" is a two and a half hour surf lesson before the park opens (additional cost).
- Castaway Creek: a continuously flowing, 2,100-foot (640 m) "lazy river" that slowly circles the entire park, passing through gentle waterfalls, lush rainforests, mist screens, and Mount Mayday itself. Riders can float on their own or in the inner tubes provided.
- Ketchakiddee Creek: a play area for young children featuring small slides and fountains. There are water features that spray everywhere including a tugboat and a mixture of whales and seals. A small sandy beach is also provided.

== Former Shark Reef ==
Considered one of the most unique attractions at any Disney park, Typhoon Lagoon's Shark Reef provided guests a 5–15 minute snorkel across a manmade lagoon brimming with rays, small sharks, and tropical fish. The artificial reef consisted of a 362,000-gallon dual tank habitat separated by an overturned "sunken tanker"—a disguised underwater viewing tunnel. Without official statements from Disney Parks, analysts point to its uniquely high operating costs (animals and their care takers, water temperature regulation, water filtration, life guards, et al.) as reason for its permanent closure on October 3, 2016. Since closure, the sunken tanker has been walled off and the tank closest to the pathways has been filled in, covered with sand, and converted into a seating/lounge area. The entrance building to the attraction has been converted into a quick service bar and eatery.

=== Attractions ===
- Shark Reef: Hosted by NAUI, snorkel through an unheated, saltwater reef populated with stingrays, bonnethead sharks, leopard sharks, and colorful tropical fish.
- Sunken Tanker: Underwater viewing area of the reefs. Viewing provided through tankers portholes.
- S.A.S Adventure: A 30-minute "Surface Air Snorkeling" experience. Using a "pony" tank, a small regulator, and a buoyancy vest experience the "Shark Reef" in a different way (additional cost). All participants had to be at least 5 years of age.
- Hammer Head Fred's Dive Shop: Where the attractions snorkels, masks, life jackets, and unheated showers were located. This is now a bar.

== Food and beverage ==
- Leaning Palms: Previously the Placid Palms resort, the main counter service restaurant. Surrounded by shaded seating areas. Located near the main entrance.
- Typhoon Tilly's: Located near the "Shark Reef".
- Happy Landings Ice Cream: Located in between "Getaway Glenn" and "Castaway Creek".
- Let's Go Slurpin': Bar located on the beach by the wave pool.
- Surf Doggies: A surfers car set up on the beach, adorned by surfboards.
- Crush Cart: A small cart opposite the entrance to Crush n Gusher.
- Snack Shack: Located next to the Typhoon Tilly's. Offers options of salads, waffles, sandwiches, and ice creams

=== Picnic areas ===
There are 2 designated picnic areas located in the park. However, there are no restrictions as to where to have a picnic.

- Getaway Glenn: Located behind "Happy Landings" near the front of the park.
- Hideaway Bay: Located near Crush 'n' Gusher and the dressing rooms.

Coolers are allowed in the park. The only restricted items are glass and alcohol.

== Merchandise ==
- Singapore Sal's: Only Merchandise store used for rentals, offering souvenirs, swimwear, footwear, etc.
- High 'N Dry: It is not a rental location anymore. It is now a craft beverage shop dispensing frozen alcohol, domestic beer, and snacks.

== See also ==
Incidents at Disney's Typhoon Lagoon
