= Spry (surname) =

Spry is a surname. Notable people with the surname include:

- Sir Charles Spry (1910–1994), director-general of the Australian Security Intelligence Organisation
- Constance Spry (1886–1960, née Fletcher), British educator, florist and author
- Major-General Daniel Spry (1913–1989), Canadian commander of the 3rd Canadian Infantry Division
- Eunice Spry (born 1944), British criminal
- Graham Spry (1900–1983), Canadian broadcaster
- Henry Harpur Spry (1804–1842), British Indian army medical officer
- Irene Spry (1907–1998), Canadian economic historian
- John Spry (priest) (1690–1763), Archdeacon of Berkshire
- Judith Spry, (born 1942, later Judith Moriarty), American politician, Missouri Secretary of State
- Keith Spry (1911-1991), New Zealand swimmer, conservationist and politician.
- Lib Spry, Canadian playwright and director
- Sir Richard Spry (1715–1775), Admiral of the Royal Navy
- Robin Spry (1939–2005), Canadian filmmaker and television producer
- William Spry (1864–1929), American politician, Governor of Utah
- Lieutenant-General William Spry, British army officer

== See also ==
- Spry family
