= Spurt =

Spurt may refer to:

- Secretory protein in upper respiratory tracts, a gene encoding a secretory protein
- Spurt (Dutch Railways), a trade name for certain Dutch Rail routes

== See also ==
- Blood spurt
- Growth spurt, the increase in bone growth during puberty
- Strength spurt, the increase of muscle mass and physical strength during puberty
- Spert (disambiguation)
- Spirthill
