= Disney (disambiguation) =

The Walt Disney Company is an American company and diversified multinational mass media and entertainment conglomerate.

Disney may also refer to:

- Walt Disney (1901–1966), a co-founder of The Walt Disney Company

== Units of The Walt Disney Company ==
- Disney Enterprises, Inc., the main copyright holder and trademark owner of The Walt Disney Company
  - Walt Disney Studios (Burbank), the main studio lot in Burbank, California and company headquarters of The Walt Disney Company
  - Walt Disney Studios (division), the main film studio division of The Walt Disney Company
    - Walt Disney Studios Motion Pictures (formerly known as Buena Vista Pictures Distribution), the main theatrical film distribution division of The Walt Disney Company
    - Walt Disney Pictures, the main theatrical film distribution banner of The Walt Disney Company and production company division of The Walt Disney Company
      - Walt Disney Animation Studios (formerly known as Walt Disney Feature Animation), the main film animation studio division of The Walt Disney Company
    - Walt Disney Studios Home Entertainment (through Buena Vista Home Entertainment and formerly known as Walt Disney Home Video and Walt Disney Home Entertainment), the home video distribution division of The Walt Disney Company
    - Disney Theatrical Group, the main live show, stage play of The Walt Disney Company and musical production arm of The Walt Disney Company
      - Disney Theatrical Productions, the main flagship stage play of The Walt Disney Company and musical production division of The Walt Disney Company
    - Disney Music Group, the main music publishing arm of The Walt Disney Company
      - Walt Disney Records, the main flagship music label of The Walt Disney Company
  - Disney Experiences, the main division of The Walt Disney Company which builds and manages Disney's theme parks and vacation resorts, Disney Stores, merchandising, publishing and digital media, games and interactive experiences of The Walt Disney Company
    - Walt Disney World Resort
    - Disneyland Resort
      - Disneyland
      - Disney California Adventure
    - Disneyland Paris
    - Hong Kong Disneyland Resort
    - Tokyo Disney Resort
    - Shanghai Disney Resort
    - Disney Signature Experiences, non-theme park travel units
      - Adventures by Disney
      - Disney Cruise Line
      - Disney's Castaway Cay
      - Disney Vacation Club
    - Walt Disney Imagineering, the research and development arm of The Walt Disney Company responsible for the creation, design and construction of global Disney theme parks and attractions of The Walt Disney Company
    - Disney Publishing Worldwide, the publishing division of The Walt Disney Company
  - Disney Programs, division that provides paid internship experiences in The Walt Disney Company to college students and graduates of The Walt Disney Company
    - Disney College Program
    - Disney International Programs
  - Disney Media Networks, the former division of The Walt Disney Company before the October 10, 2020 breakup and restructuring into Disney Media and Entertainment Distribution, Disney General Entertainment Content and ESPN and Sports Content
    - Walt Disney Television — a division of The Walt Disney Company rebranded as "Disney General Entertainment Content" or "Disney General Entertainment" in 2021
      - Disney Channel, a pay television network owned by The Walt Disney Company
      - Walt Disney Television, a broken-up and defunct American television production company arm of The Walt Disney Company active from 1983 to 2003
      - Disney Television Animation, the television animation studio division of The Walt Disney Company
      - Capital Disney, a defunct digital radio station in the United Kingdom owned by The Walt Disney Company which was active from 2002 until 2007
      - Radio Disney, a defunct radio network in the United States owned by The Walt Disney Company which was active from 1996 until 2021
      - Disney+, a streaming service launched on November 12, 2019, and is owned and operated by The Walt Disney Company

== People ==
=== With the surname ===
- Disney family, family of Walt Disney
  - Roy O. Disney (1893–1971), Walt's brother and co-founder of The Walt Disney Company
  - Roy E. Disney (1930–2009), son of Roy O. and leader of the Save Disney campaign
  - Abigail Disney (born 1960), Walt's grandniece, philanthropist and film-maker
  - Lillian Disney (1899–1997), Walt's wife
  - Elias Disney (1859–1941), father of Walt and Roy O.
  - Diane Marie Disney (1933–2013), Walt's daughter
- David T. Disney (1803–1857), American politician from Ohio
- Donald Disney, Fellow of the Institute of Electrical and Electronics Engineers
- Doris Miles Disney (1907–1976), American author
- Dorothy Cameron Disney (1903–1992), American author
- Guy Disney (born 1982), British steeplechase jockey
- John Disney (disambiguation), several people
- Melissa Disney (born 1970), American voice actress
- Moore Disney (1766–1846), British Army officer
- Richard Disney (disambiguation), several people
- Wesley E. Disney, former American congressman from Oklahoma
- Disney-Roebuck family, see Captain Disney-Roebuck

=== Other ===
- Disney (Indian director), Indian film director
- Disney Rodríguez, a Cuban freestyle wrestler

== Other uses ==
- Disney, Oklahoma, United States
- Disney bomb, a British "rocket-assisted" bomb of World War II
- Disney (crater), crater on Mercury
- Norton Disney, Lincolnshire, U.K.

== See also ==
- Disney Enterprises (disambiguation)
- Disneyland (disambiguation)
- Walt Disney (disambiguation)
- Dizney, Kentucky, U.S.
