= Magic Kingdom (disambiguation) =

The Magic Kingdom is a theme park at the Walt Disney World Resort in Florida.

Magic Kingdom may also refer to:

- Magic Kingdom (band), a Belgian band
- Magic Kingdom, Sydney, a defunct theme park in Sydney, Australia
- Magic Kingdom: Ang Alamat ng Damortis, a 1997 Filipino fantasy adventure film
- Magic Kingdom of Landover, a series of novels by Terry Brooks
- The Magic Kingdom (novel), a 2011 novel by Russell Banks
- The Magic Kingdom: Walt Disney and the American Way of Life, a 1997 book by Steven Watts
- The Magic Kingdom, a 1985 novel by Stanley Elkin

== See also ==
- Disneyland (disambiguation)
