= Impact of the COVID-19 pandemic on the Walt Disney Company =

Aspect of viral outbreak

The Walt Disney Company and its subsidiaries have been variously impacted by the COVID-19 pandemic; the company has business interests in areas that involve mass gatherings (including its theme parks and film releases) and isolation (including its streaming service and U.S. television brands).

== Leadership and business ==
In March 2020, Disney's executive chairman Bob Iger announced that he would not take any salary during the pandemic; in 2019 he earned $47.5 million. Chief executive Bob Chapek announced that he will take a 50% pay cut.

The president of Walt Disney World, Josh D'Amaro, was included on Florida Governor Ron DeSantis's board for re-opening the state and reinvigorating its economy, while Disney Parks' VP Thomas Mazloum is on the task force for Orange County, Florida's economic recovery.

The publicly listed shares of the company fell 28% on April 20, 2020.

== Theme parks ==
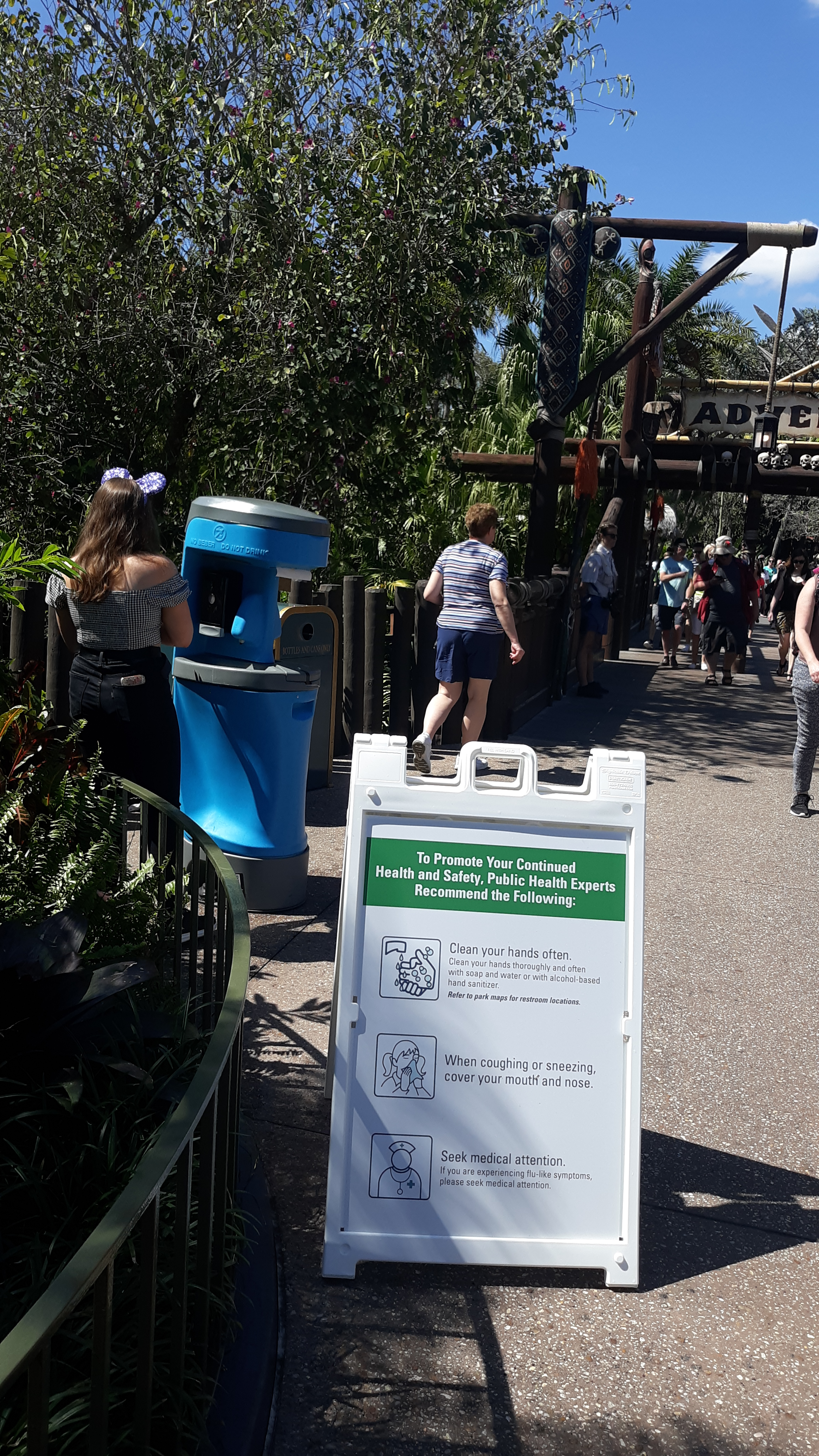
A sign posted at the entrance to Adventureland in the Magic Kingdom shortly before the extended closure of the Walt Disney World Resort

Two of the company's theme parks, Hong Kong Disneyland and Shanghai Disneyland, closed on January 25, 2020. On February 28, the Tokyo Disney Resort closed.

On March 12, the company announced that Disneyland Resort, Walt Disney World Resort, and Disneyland Paris would be closed beginning March 15 through at least the end of the month, marking the first time that all six Disney resorts worldwide were closed. Two days later, Disney announced the temporary suspension of its internship programs, including the Disney College Program and International Programs, which was later extended until the end of 2020. Due to the closure of Walt Disney World, the British variety show Ant & Dec's Saturday Night Takeaway canceled a finale taping that had been set to film at the resort in April. On March 27, the closure of both U.S. resorts were extended indefinitely. Cast members were to be paid through the week of April 18, 2020.

Iger suggested that when parks reopen, temperature checks on visitors will become routine.

Walt Disney World employs 75,000 total workers, the biggest single-site employer in the United States. From the week beginning April 20, 2020, over 100,000 staff at Disney theme parks and hotels were put on indefinite unpaid leave, to save the company $500 million. The move was taken due to the extended period of closures for these destinations, which earn over $1 billion per quarter. Disney had arranged with the Florida unemployment program for its 26,000 UNITE HERE union workers in the state to be automatically enrolled, preventing them from needing to apply on the system that is said to regularly fail – though the state's benefits have been criticized for only paying out $275 a week for 12 weeks.

Shanghai Disneyland was the first park to reopen on May 11, 2020, with new safety protocols. Park capacity was limited to 30%, social distancing measures were instituted, and temperature checks and face masks were required for entrance. On May 20, following the easing of some restrictions in Florida for retail and dining establishments, third party retailers at Disney Springs were allowed to reopen. Disney-owned stores in the shopping district reopened on May 27. On May 27, the Orange County Recovery Task Force in Orlando approved Disney's phased approach to opening the Walt Disney World Resort, with Magic Kingdom and Animal Kingdom slated to reopen on July 11, followed by the reopening of Epcot and Disney's Hollywood Studios on July 15.

On June 10, 2020, the Disneyland Resort in California announced its intentions for reopening. Pending local government approval, the resort intended to open the Downtown Disney shopping district on July 9. The reopening of the Disneyland Park and Disney California Adventure was set to follow shortly after on July 17, 2020, sixty-five years to the day the original park opened. However, the reopening of Disneyland, Disney California Adventure and Disney owned resort hotels were postponed indefinitely due to the continuation of the pandemic.

On June 1, the Tokyo Disneyland Resort shopping district, Ikspiari, reopened to the public. The Parks reopened on July 1.

Disneyland Paris reopened on July 15, 2020, but closed in late October when France started a second lockdown.

On September 29, 2020, the New York Times reported that Disney was laying off 28,000 people in the United States, due to the impact of the pandemic on its parks, resorts, cruise line, and retail store business. According to Josh D'Amaro, the chairman of Disney's parks, 67% of the employees reported to be laid off were part-time workers who were paid by the hour.

On November 9, 2020, the Disneyland Resort announced additional furloughs for executive, salaried and hourly cast members. No reopening date for the California parks was known.

On January 11, 2021, Orange County officials announced that Disneyland was set to become a massive COVID-19 vaccination site.

On February 8, 2021, outdoor dining reopened in Downtown Disney. From March 18 through April 19, 2021, Disneyland and Disney California hosted a limited-capacity ticketed event called “A Touch of Disney”, which offered guests to shop at stores and enjoy eateries around the parks. On March 5, 2021, it was announced that Disneyland and Disney California Adventure could reopen with capacity restrictions beginning on April 1, 2021. Four days later, Disney CEO Bob Chapek announced at a shareholder's meeting that the company was planning on officially reopening the parks in late April 2021. On March 17, 2021, it was then announced by Disney Parks, Experiences and Products that both Disneyland and Disney California Adventure would officially reopen on April 30, 2021.

On May 3, 2021, the return of the Disney College Program in Orlando was announced for June 2021 with priority given for 2020 applicants to reapply. Though no immediate announcement was made for the program in Anaheim, the Culinary Program, Professional Internships or the International Programs, in July 2021, the Culinary Program was confirmed to return to Orlando for the August 2021 semester.

Disneyland Paris reopened on June 17, 2021, marking the first day in 17 months that all Disney parks worldwide were open.

The Disney International Programs returned to Orlando with the Cultural Representative Program in August 2022, as announced by Disney Programs on March 25, 2022.

== Cruises ==
On March 12, 2020, Disney Cruise Line made the decision to stop sailing. It suspended all ships on March 14, when the US Centers for Disease Control and Prevention ordered cruises to stop sailing for 30 days. On April 6, Disney Cruise Line extended its shutdown and announced it would not launch ships until April 28, and would not travel to Canada until July 1, in line with Canadian cruise ship restrictions. As compensation to passengers, Disney offered full refunds or to re-book a cruise for within 15 months of the original departure. Per CDC direction, the cruise line on June 8, 2020, its restart dates canceled additional trips with Dream class ships sailings through July 27 while the Magic and Wonder sailings through October 2 and September 14, 2020, respectively.

== Cinema and television ==
=== Walt Disney Studios and Television ===
On March 19, Walt Disney Studios announced that they would no longer report box office figures.

As films began to cancel wide releases at the start of 2020, Disney's Mulan, which was set to premiere on March 27, but was postponed in China and Italy. Particularly for Disney, Mulan not opening in China, where it aimed to make most of its money, was concerning, especially with the possibility of pirated copies appearing, discouraging Chinese patronage in cinemas on release. Mulan's London premiere on March 12 went ahead without a red carpet, but the next day it was announced that the film was removed from the release calendar; on this day, Disney also postponed the releases of Antlers and The New Mutants. Also on March 13, Walt Disney Television announced that production was suspended on many of its series. The Disney Family Singalong, an ABC special on April 16, which featured karaoke performances of songs from Disney works with celebrity guests, was created during the lockdowns in the US.

==== Delayed productions ====
- American Housewife
- Big Shot (for Disney+; production suspended)
- Big Sky (postponed after casting finished)
- Empire
- Genius
- Grey's Anatomy
- The Goldbergs (season 7 finale not filmed)
- High School Musical: The Musical: The Series (for Disney+; season 2 production suspended)
- Home Sweet Home Alone (for Disney+; production suspended)
- The Hunchback of Notre Dame
- The Last Duel (production suspended)
- The Little Mermaid
- Peter Pan & Wendy
- Pose
- Queen of the South
- Shrunk
- Schooled (season 2 finale not filmed)
- Snow White

==== Delayed releases ====
- Mulan (moved from March 27, 2020, to July 24, 2020, and again to August 21, 2020, before getting its North American theatrical release cancelled and moving to Disney+)
- The Bob's Burgers Movie (moved from July 17, 2020, to April 9, 2021, and again to May 27, 2022)
- Deep Water (moved from November 13, 2020, to August 13, 2021, and again to January 14, 2022, and then moved to Hulu)
- Free Guy (moved from July 3, 2020, to December 11, 2020, and again to May 21, 2021, and then further to August 13, 2021)
- The King's Man (moved from September 18, 2020, to February 26, 2021, and up to February 12, 2021, and down to March 12, 2021, then down to August 20, 2021, and then down further to December 22, 2021)
- Jungle Cruise (moved from July 24, 2020, to July 30, 2021; its original release date was taken by the postponed earlier film Mulan)
- Indiana Jones and the Dial of Destiny (moved from July 9, 2021, to July 29, 2022, and again to June 30, 2023)
- The New Mutants (moved from April 3 to August 28, 2020)
- Antlers (moved from April 17, 2020, to February 19, 2021, and again to October 29, 2021)
- The Personal History of David Copperfield (release outside the UK moved from May 8, 2020, to August 14, 2020, and again to August 28, 2020)
- The Woman in the Window (May 15, 2020, theatrical release scrapped; moved to Netflix)
- Nomadland (moved from December 4, 2020, to February 19, 2021, and up to January 29, 2021)
- Ron's Gone Wrong (moved from February 26, 2021, to April 23, 2021, and again to October 22, 2021)
- Raya and the Last Dragon (moved from November 25, 2020, to March 12, 2021, and up to March 5, 2021)
- West Side Story (moved from December 18, 2020, to December 10, 2021)
- Death on the Nile (moved from October 9, 2020, to October 23, 2020, and again to December 18, 2020, then to September 17, 2021, and then further to February 11, 2022)
- The Empty Man (moved from August 7, 2020, to December 4, 2020, and up to October 23, 2020)
- Everybody's Talking About Jamie (moved from October 23, 2020, to January 22, 2021, and again to February 26, 2021, and then moved to Amazon Prime Video)

=== Pixar ===
The 2020 opening March weekend's biggest film was Disney/Pixar's Onward, making around US$39 million. This was dramatically lower than the year before, when Disney/Marvel film Captain Marvel earned over US$153 million. For its second weekend, during the worst box office period the US had seen in decades, Onward saw the biggest weekend-to-weekend drop of any Pixar film, making $10.5 million, though was still the weekend's biggest film and the only one to make over $10 million. It did not open in the areas most affected by the pandemic; while cinemas were closed in China, it also chose not to open in South Korea, Italy or Japan, and was ultimately made available to purchase digitally on March 21. It was then added to Disney+ on April 3.

Pixar delayed its next release, Soul, from June 19, 2020, to November 20, 2020, before cancelling its theatrical showing and instead giving the film a Christmas 2020 release on Disney+. The 2021 film Luca also was released direct-to-streaming on Disney+ on June 18, 2021, along with a simultaneous limited run at the El Capitan Theatre; it was released in theaters in countries without the streaming service. Turning Red was released to Disney+ on March 11, 2022, along with one-week limited engagements at the El Capitan Theatre, AMC Empire 25, and Grand Lake Theatre, amid the surge in COVID-19 cases fueled by the Omicron variant.

=== Disney+ ===
The Disney+ European launch press event was postponed. With the lockdowns during the pandemic, it was noted that the popularity of streaming services, including Disney+, would increase. Disney saw fit that the service should go live in India on March 11, eighteen days before it the initial release date was expected to. It also added the film Frozen II to the streaming service earlier than first expected, on March 15 instead of June 26, and sent its movie adaptation Artemis Fowl directly onto Disney+ on June 12, rather than releasing it in theatres. A recording of the broadway musical Hamilton also was shifted from a theatrical release to the service, despite the company paying $75 million for the rights to release it in theatres in 2021. The One and Only Ivan was also added directly to Disney+ on August 21, rather than its planned theatrical release. Mulan, after being delayed several times, had its U.S. along with multiple international releases in cinemas cancelled and instead premiered on Disney+ on September 4, 2020.

Disney+ had achieved over 50 million subscribers in its first five months online (to April 2020). By November 2020, it had more than 73 million subscribers.

=== Marvel Cinematic Universe ===
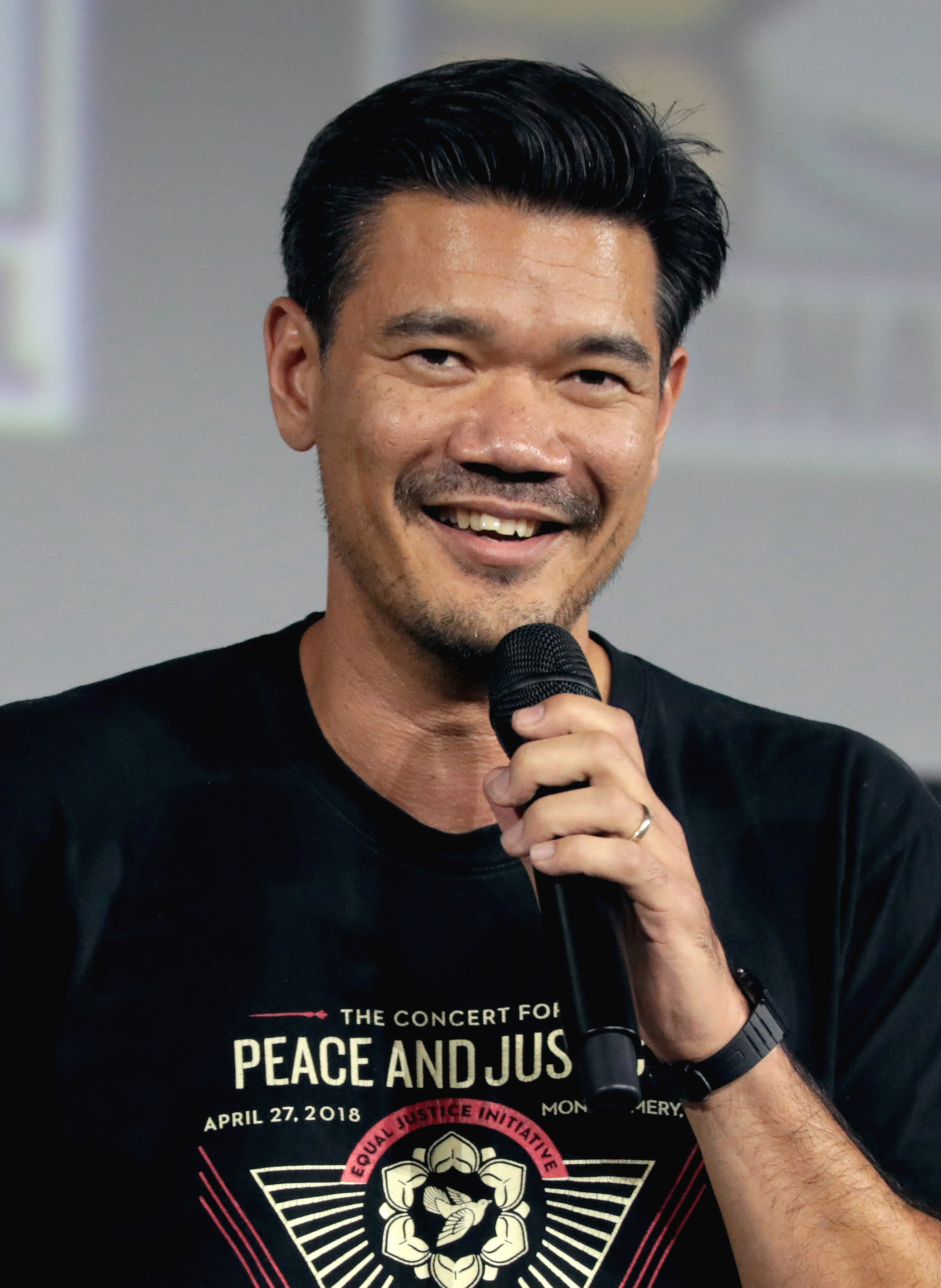
Director Destin Daniel Cretton's self-isolation stopped production of Shang-Chi and the Legend of the Ten Rings.

The Marvel Cinematic Universe was first hit on March 12; the Marvel Studios film Shang-Chi and the Legend of the Ten Rings, which was shooting in Australia, suspended production due to director Destin Daniel Cretton self-isolating due to suspected coronavirus, though he later tested negative. The next day, despite several Disney films having their releases postponed in a company announcement. The first film of Phase Four – Black Widow, which was set to premiere on May 1, was initially not one of these. This omission was speculated to be because the other films are standalone, while moving Black Widow would affect the development and distribution of the future Marvel Cinematic Universe and the Marvel Disney+ works, with Disney holding off on an early postponement announcement; Black Widow was finally postponed on March 17, when Disney also postponed its other May releases. It had earlier been speculated that Black Widow would be able to take Marvel's November release date planned for Eternals, as Marvel had 'claimed' many future dates for blockbuster releases, which could save the film's prospects where smaller company releases may not. The replacement was later confirmed, with a domino effect causing each future Marvel film to be sequentially replaced. This also bumped Shang-Chi, with Marvel's first Asian hero, out of its Chinese New Year release date: it was due to be released in February 2021 but was displaced by the sequel of 2016 film Doctor Strange. However, given the film's early production shut-down, it may have missed its planned release date, anyway. Due to release delays and continuous coronavirus cases in the United States, Disney announced both Black Widow and Eternals pushed to a year from their original schedule, with Shang-Chi pushed to a fall 2021 release. 2020 was the first year since 2009 that did not release a MCU film.

The Marvel Disney+ series The Falcon and the Winter Soldier suspended production in Prague, the Czech Republic, where the series was set to film for a week. The series resumed production in Atlanta before global production was halted. Because of the pandemic, the series premiere was pushed back from 2020 to 2021.

==== Impacted productions ====
===== Films =====
- Black Widow (moved from May 1, 2020, then to November 6, 2020, then to May 7, 2021, and to July 9, 2021)
- Shang-Chi and the Legend of the Ten Rings (moved from February 12, 2021, then to May 7, 2021, then to July 9, 2021, and to September 3, 2021)
- Eternals (moved from November 6, 2020, then to February 12, 2021, and to November 5, 2021; replacing Thor: Love and Thunder)
- Spider-Man: No Way Home (co-production with Columbia Pictures and released by Sony Pictures Releasing; moved from July 16, 2021, then to November 5, 2021, and to December 17, 2021)
- Doctor Strange in the Multiverse of Madness (moved from May 7, 2021, then to November 5, 2021, then to March 25, 2022, and to May 6, 2022; replacing Black Panther: Wakanda Forever)
- Thor: Love and Thunder (moved from November 5, 2021, then to February 18, 2022, and to February 11, 2022, and to May 6, 2022; and to July 8, 2022; replacing The Marvels)
- Black Panther: Wakanda Forever (moved from May 6, 2022, to July 8, 2022; and to November 11, 2022)
- The Marvels (moved from July 8, 2022, to November 11, 2022, and then to February 17, 2023, and then to July 28, 2023, and then to November 10, 2023)

===== Television series =====
- The Falcon and the Winter Soldier (on Disney+, filming suspended; moved from 2020 to 2021 release)
- Loki (on Disney+; filming suspended)
- WandaVision (on Disney+; production suspended)

=== Lucasfilm ===
On May 11, 2020, Lucasfilm released a video featuring Mark Hamill thanking Star Wars fans from all over the world, who worked as medical and healthcare workers, for their efforts to combat the spread of COVID-19 in their countries.

On June 15, 2020, it was announced that the Star Wars convention "Celebration Anaheim 2020" had been canceled due to the pandemic, with the next event scheduled for August 18–21, 2022 at the Anaheim Convention Center.

On July 23, 2020, it was reported that the next three Star Wars films have been delayed by a year each to December 2023, December 2025, and December 2027 respectively as a result of the pandemic.

=== Blue Sky Studios ===
On February 9, 2021, Disney announced that it would be closing the animation studio Blue Sky Studios, which it had acquired through its acquisition of 21st Century Fox on March 20, 2019. A studio spokesperson had stated that it was no longer sustainable for Disney to run a third traditional in-house brick and mortar feature animation studio facility due to the economic impact of the ongoing COVID-19 pandemic on the film industry. The closure of Blue Sky Studios affected 450 employees, with Disney stating that it would help them find work at its internal studios. As a result, production of a film adaptation of the webcomic Nimona, originally scheduled to be released on January 14, 2022, was initially cancelled as a result of its closure although the film was revived at Netflix in April 2022. Disney also retained Blue Sky's film library and intellectual properties via 20th Century Animation. The studio officially closed on April 10, 2021, and was succeeded by 20th Century Animation.

== Stage ==
All West End and Broadway Disney Theatrical Productions were closed, as Broadway and West End shut down in March 2020. On May 14, 2020, it was announced that the Broadway musical Frozen would not reopen after the lockdown was lifted. The show performed its final performance on March 11, the day before all Broadway theatres closed. The US national tour would open when tenable. The international productions, West End, Australia, Japan, and Germany, have been pushed back to 2021.

The two-year Broadway run cost about $35 million to mount, attracted attendance over 1.3 million and gross over $150 million. While not the box office performer as Hamilton or its stablemates The Lion King and Aladdin, the musical had mostly favorable reviews and a solid box office by grossing in the 80%-90% of box office potential. The 2019 holiday year end week gross about $2.2 million and April 2020 hit 98% of potential. Thus Frozen was chosen to close given the future lower attendance at theatres.

As Broadway and the West End reopened in 2021, Disney was able to open or re-open productions. The Lion King re-opened on Broadway on September 14 of that year, and on the West End on July 29. As intended, the West End production of Frozen began previews on August 27, and held its opening night on September 8 The Broadway production of Aladdin re-opened on September 28.

== Comic books ==
On March 23, 2020, preeminent North American direct market comic book industry wholesaler Diamond Comics Distribution announced that they would not ship comic books scheduled for release on April 1 or afterwards as many of the comic shops they service were forced to close or move to curbside pickup and/or delivery. Eight days later, Marvel Comics announced it would cease publishing single comic book issues in digital and print format starting the following day. On April 28, Diamond announced it would resume distribution of single issue comics to retailers, with in-store availability scheduled for May 20. Marvel Comics issues were accordingly rescheduled for publication starting that day, ending a 7-week period of delays. As of May 2021, several Marvel series originally scheduled for release prior to the pandemic have not been rescheduled. IDW Publishing, which published licensed Disney comics in North America during the period and is the current publisher of licensed all-ages Marvel and Star Wars comics, also had their single-issue publications suspended by Diamond's shutdown.
