= Theme park operations careers =

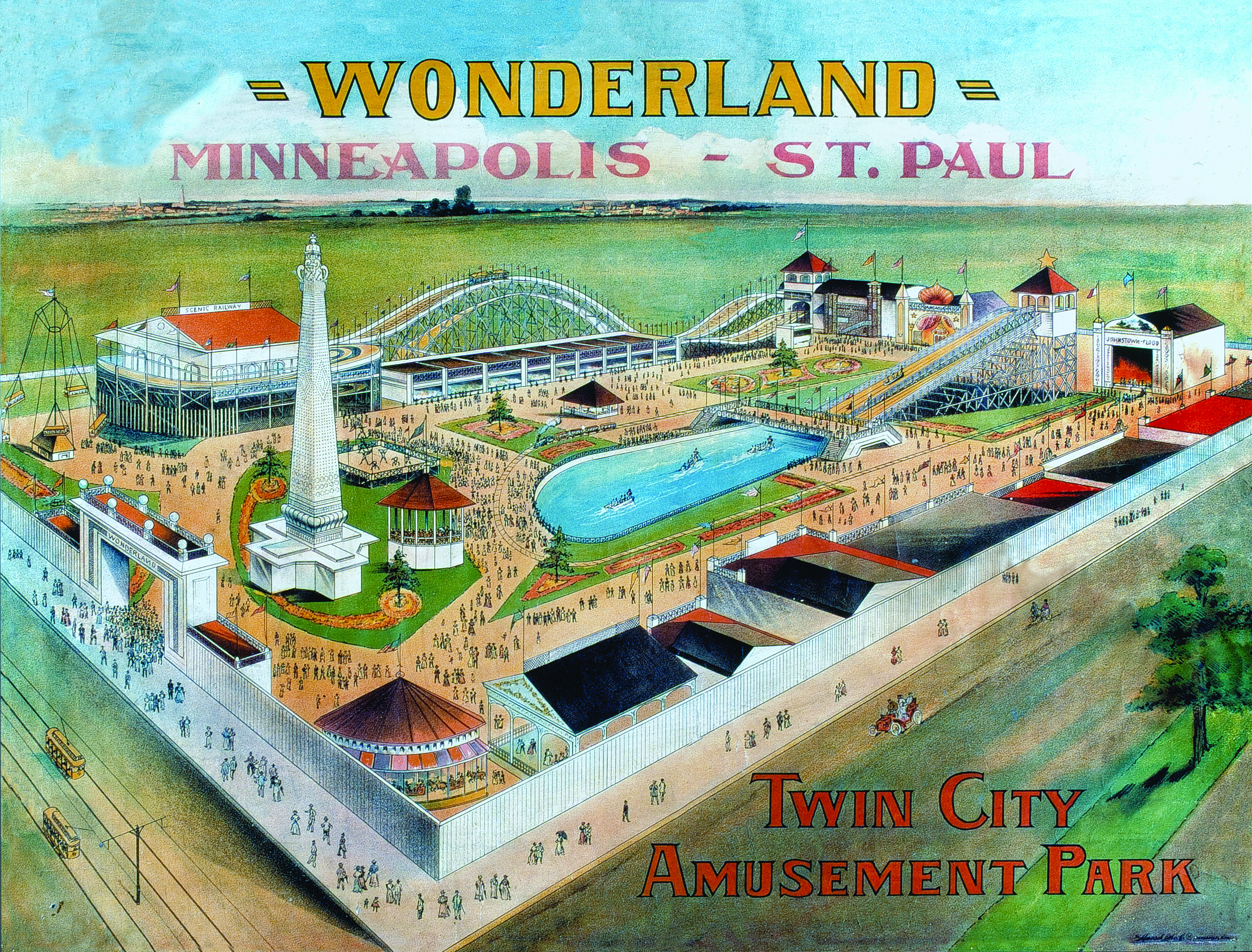
Wonderland Amusement Park Poster

Theme parks provided roughly 200,000 careers in the US in 2024, as estimated by IBISWorld. Theme parks provide careers through two main facets: design and operation. While operations covers the people working once a park is built and functioning, design covers the conception, development, and implementation of a theme park. Operations may include competitive positions in management and hospitality, but also easily approachable and seasonal careers including food service workers, retail attendants, and rider operators.

== Operations categories ==
The number of people involved with operating a theme park directly correlates to the size of the considered theme park. While the quantity of jobs may vary, the types of jobs are rather consistent. These varied roles can be categorized into 9 departments (as described by David Younger in Theme Park Design & The Art of Themed Entertainment):

- Attractions
- Custodial
- Entertainment
- Food & Beverages
- Guest Services
- Hotels
- Maintenance
- Merchandise
- Security

=== Attractions ===
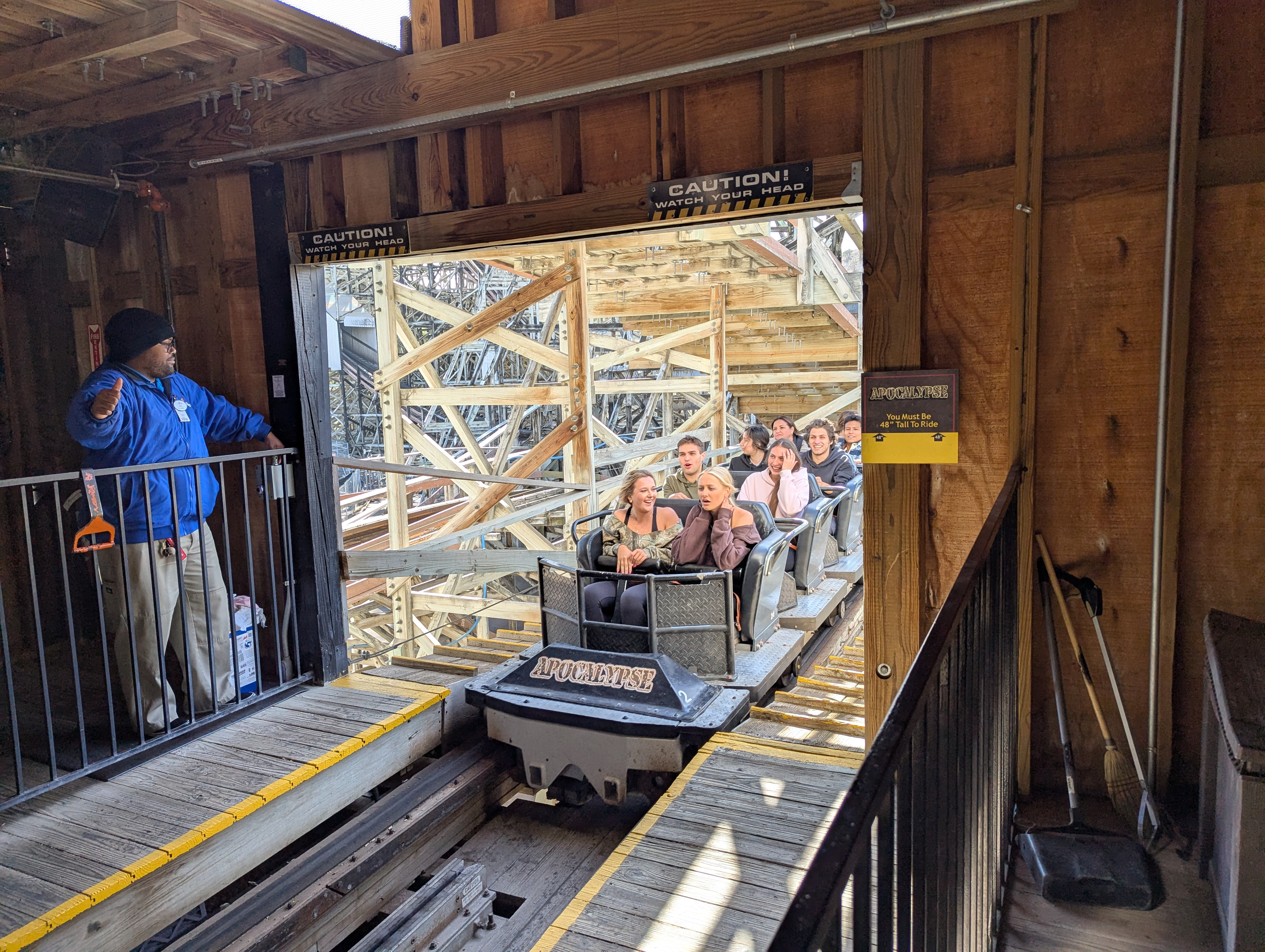
Apocalypse (Six Flags Magic Mountain) 8

Attractions, perhaps the most observed and known theme park career area, describes the members maintaining safety, flow, and functioning of the rides and attractions for guests. Specific tasks may vary based on the attraction being operated, but general actions may include physically running rides, organizing seating for guests, ensuring restraint locking, and verbally providing safety information to guests as required. Skills that a great attraction worker may possess are attention to detail, interpersonal skills, and adaptability. Job titles in attractions are often Ride Operator or Ride Attendant. Few educational requirements are present for these roles, but an age requirement of 16 years is mandated for most ride types federally; many states, however have individual laws with different age requirements. States with higher age requirements typically limit ride operators' age to 18 years old as in New York, Hawaii, and Alaska. Current advancements in ride technology has pushed theme parks to legally pursue lowering the age requirements in states with these higher age requirements, claiming that rides no longer require an age of 18 years old. Additionally, individual parks may set an internal age requirement of 18 years old. For most theme parks, these roles are filled on a seasonal basis, but larger year-round theme parks the hiring structure may vary. This includes the Disney College Program, where college students rotate on a semester basis, fulfilling these roles.

=== Custodial ===
These workers keep all areas of the parks clean. These positions are essential for the health of all guests and workers. Tasks for most custodial employees include sanitizing park structures, collecting debris, and responding to park disruptions during and outside of park hours. Skills required to be a successful custodian involve diligence, awareness, and cordiality. During park hours, guests may interact with the custodial staff; these conversations are part of the guest experience, thus being able to communicate on top of more physical tasks is a key element to being a successful theme park custodian or janitor. Physical days of repetitive tasks should be expected, so general health is required. This role is often referred to as park services. There are rarely required certifications for these roles. Note that shifts for these roles may include overnight hours to assist in park improvements without intruding on the guest experience. This shift is sometimes referred to as the 3rd shift, specifically by the Disney Company Theme Parks.

=== Entertainment ===
This segment of theme park workers describes the workers involved with permanent production shows, scheduled performances (such as parades), and individual acting (costume characters, meet and greets). The artists observed by guests, including the cast of the shows, costumed characters, and street performers, are often hired for specific roles based on audition processes. Street performers often are often previously talented members that take their abilities to theme parks. Examples of this field include bands and choir groups. Permanent shows have cast lists from the design team that are filled with ranging required skills including acting, singing, and dancing. Costume character roles range in qualifications.

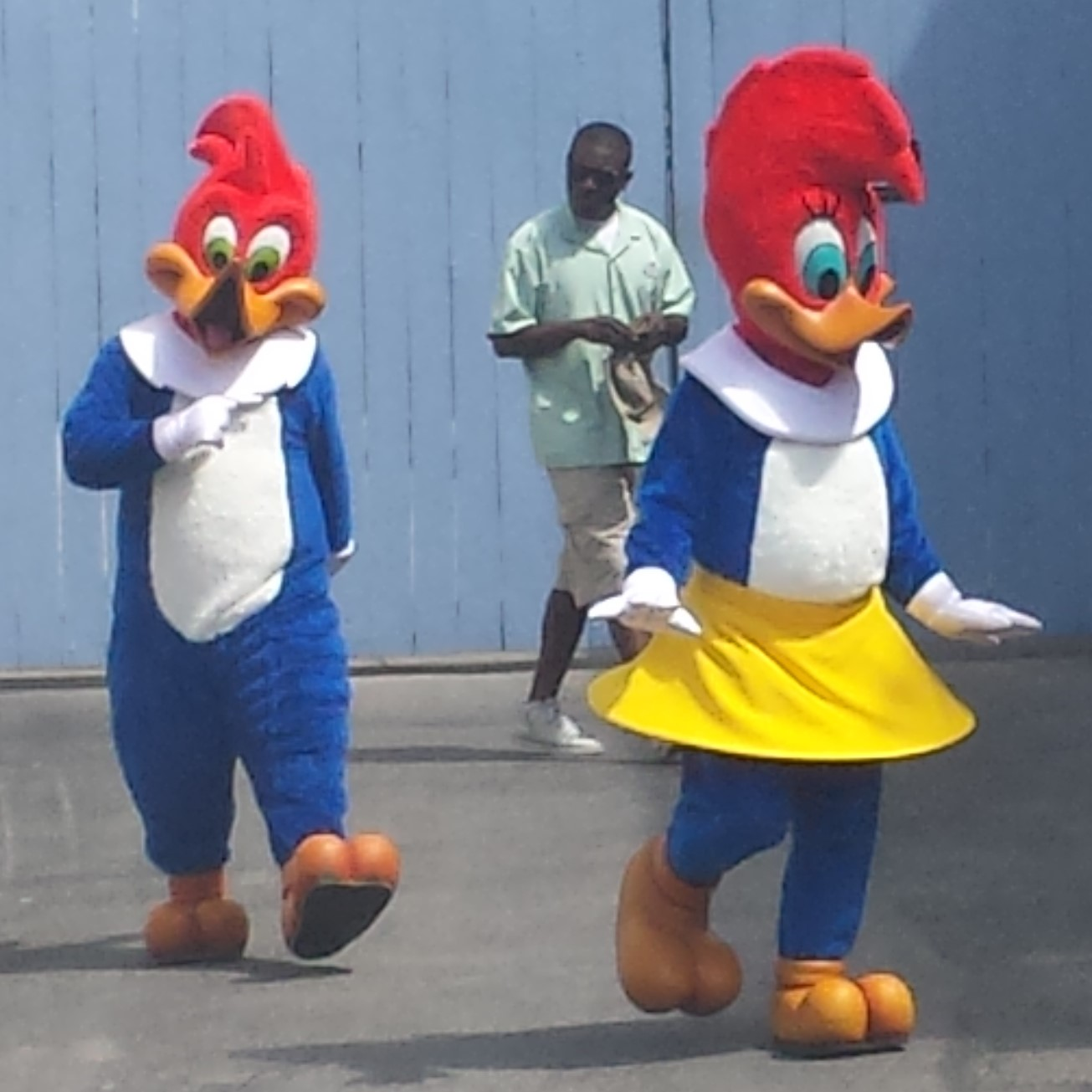
Woody_and_Winnie_Universal_Florida

While large theme parks may request previous acting experience or education to ensure IP accuracy, smaller theme parks may seasonally hire these roles, specifically for events where different costumed performers may be required. The level of 'performance' for many fully costumed characters is easily achievable for most achievable workers.

Beyond the actual performers, many supplementary roles are required for smooth operation. This includes the ushers for costumed characters that assist guest interactions. Moreover, wardrobe assistants who dress performers, are crucial to getting the desired 'look' of each performance. Wardrobe assistants, also called wardrobe attendants and costume managers, often have backgrounds in fashion. While degrees in fashion or previous experience not always required, some hard skills such as sewing can be useful in successfully fulfilling this role. Simple costumes may involve typical clothing maintenance, while more involved suits may be unique in tasks such as interactions with fur and feathers.

=== Food & beverages ===
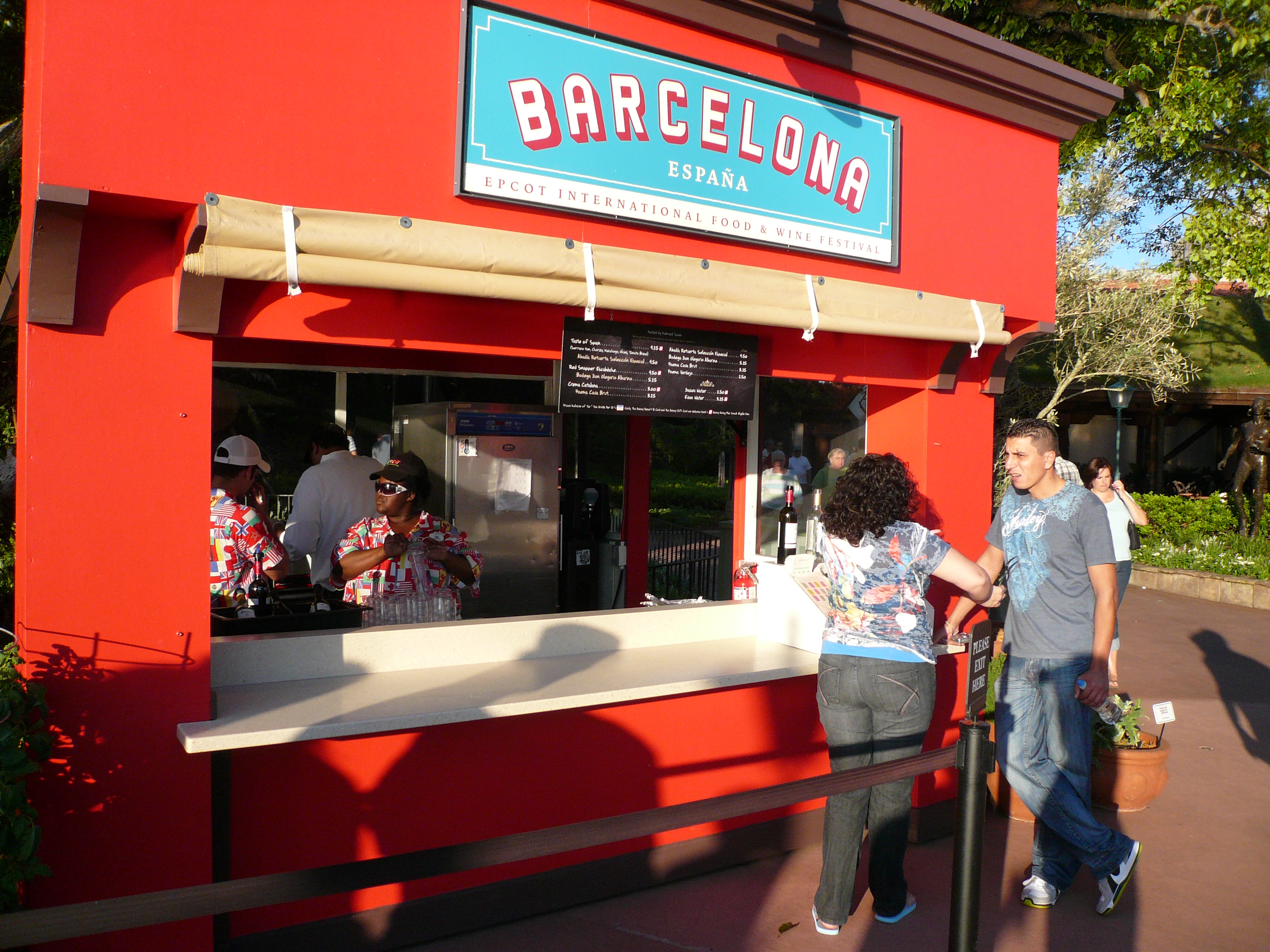
Barcelona Stand Epcot food and Wine Festival 2009 (3984503299)

This job category encapsulates a range of positions. While some jobs may be highly technical, such as a head chef, other jobs may be easily approachable such as a counter attendant. Positions involving cooking such as chefs, bakers, or bartenders often require prior experience, but do not vary drastically from their out-of-theme park counterparts. The counter service positions do not often require past experience or any certifications; however, some parks may require a certification to serve alcohol. The service side of food and beverage may have varied tasks based on the type of restaurant. This may include quick service hosts, who take orders as in a fast food restaurant, or waiters to support a longer dining experience. However, restaurants serving alcohol may have age requirements for all workers, including servers. The service side of this category is frequently filled on a seasonal basis.

=== Guest services ===
This section of operations supports guest experience by maintaining ticketing and answering questions of guests. The main task of guest service workers is often for park admissions. Guests service workers may be part of ticket purchasing process at stands outside the park or scan guest tickets to allow for park entry. Within the park, these workers are often located at a centralized location where they are available to assist guests with questions and concerns. This categories of operations may also be referred to as Guest Relations. Another feature of this job category may involve supporting VIP tours. Traits of a successful guest services worker may vary slightly based on the specific job title, but a positive attitude and strong communication skills are often recommended by job descriptions. Prior education and experience are rarely required for these jobs.

=== Hotels ===
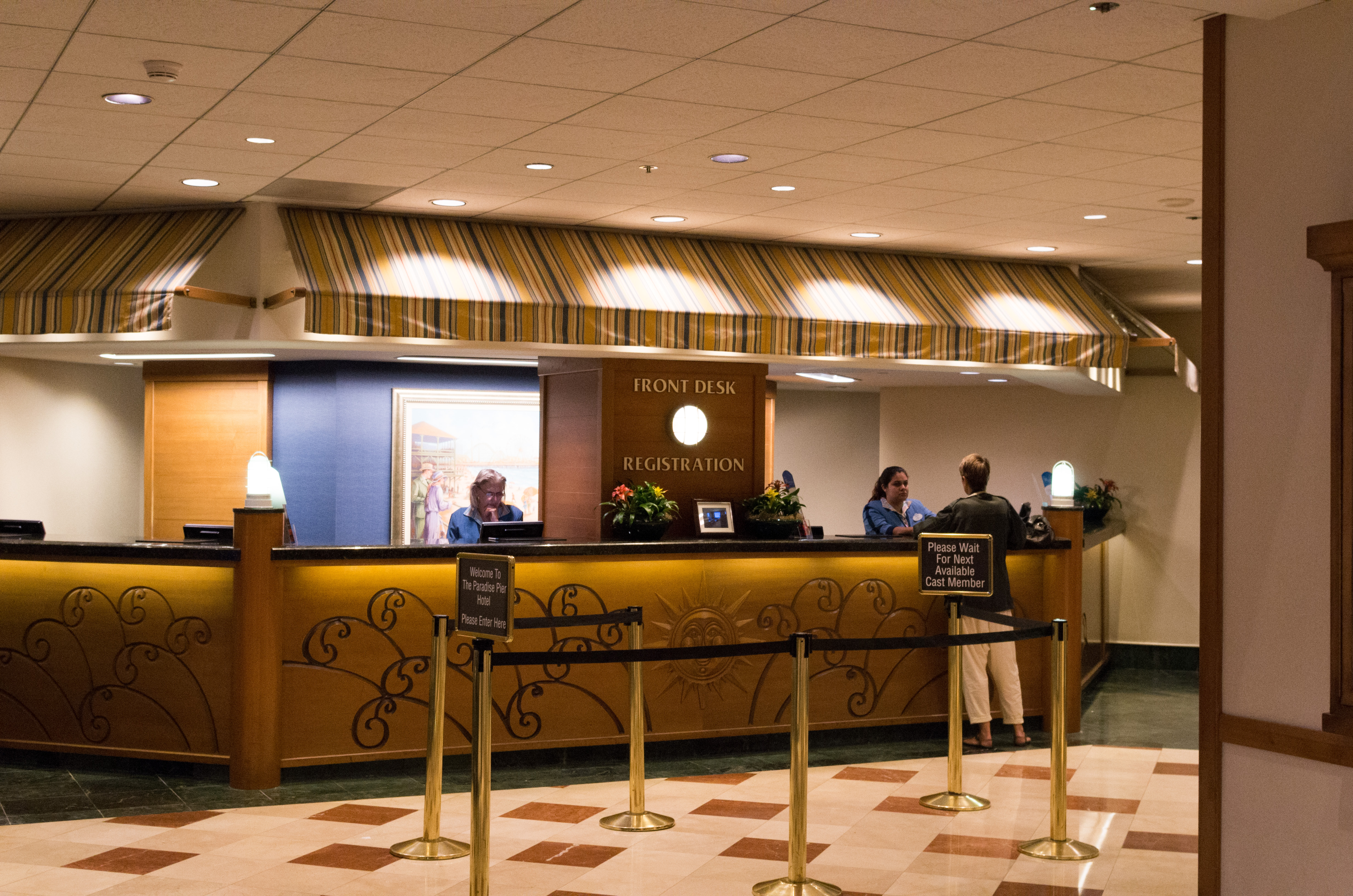
Front_Desk,_Paradise_Pier_Hotel_2014

For many theme park resorts, the actual parks are just part of the experience. Hotels are an essential component of vacations, thus the workers at these hotels are vital to the success of theme parks. Workers here may have varying tasks mirroring the overall park departments. Mainly custodial and maintenance workers may work in the hotel segments of theme parks. One notable crossover between custodial and hotel positions that is unique to hotels is the houseperson role. This cleaning role is specific to guest room cleaning but may also include larger projects such as hallway areas. Other hotel workers follow regular customer service roles, such as desk positions. Here, workers can expect to greet guests as well as guide them to their room and provide an overview of the hotel layout. Successful hotel workers will have great communication skills as well as adaptability. These roles do not often require any certifications or specific level of education.

=== Maintenance ===
While most operations roles are dominated by soft skills such as communication and listening, maintenance roles involve many technical skills. This category of work can be understood more as a trade rather than a separate position. With ride maintenance specifically involving unique problems to solve, having a technical background allows for an easier transition into the position, but learning from experience is a main characteristic of these roles. While all are essential to a positive and safe guest experience, maintenance roles can be first organized into ride technicians and non-ride technicians. Roles not focused on rides may involve plumbing, landscaping, painting, and HVAC. These roles do not vary much in required skills or certifications from their outside-of-theme park counterparts. Ride technicians are typically summarized into electrical and mechanical. Electrical technicians may handle the controls of the ride, while mechanics will ensure proper running of physical components. Despite the importance and breadth of tasks in each maintenance discipline, one technician may handle more than one focus. This is typically due to budget constraints from smaller theme parks limiting the size of the maintenance team. While some of these positions may be seasonal to support the higher demand on rides and internal park systems during the operational season, many maintenance roles are year round. Offseason maintenance roles involve larger repairs and full attraction inspections. Similar to custodial roles, these positions may involve overnight, or '3rd' shifts.

=== Merchandise ===
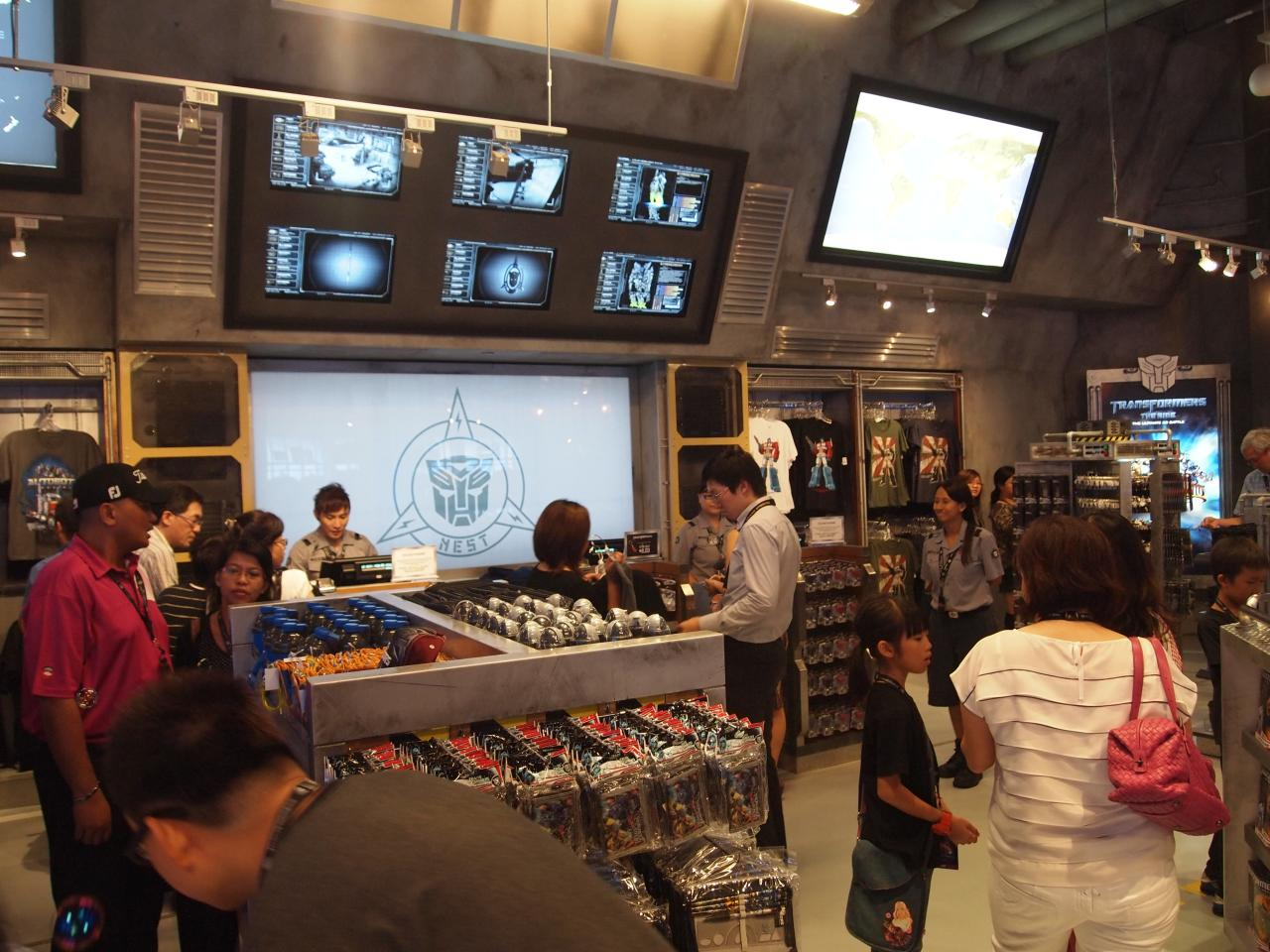
Transformers_The_Ride_merchandise_shop_(Universal_Studios_Singapore)

These roles are very similar to typical merchandise positions outside of theme parks. Theme park stores typically sell park branded clothes, toys, and memorabilia. Other items may include personal care items to improve park experience like sunscreen or ponchos. Merchandise worker tasks include stocking shelves, operating cash registers, and assisting guests in finding items. Skills for successful merchandise performance involve communication and customer service. Limited qualifications are present to work in merchandise; these roles do not often require a specific level of education but do follow state working laws for age requirements. For most theme parks, these roles are filled on a seasonal basis, but larger year-round theme parks the hiring structure may vary.

=== Security ===
Security jobs have increased in presence in the since the start of the 21st century. From inspecting bags to watching for unsafe situations to answering random questions from guests, there can be a wide variety of tasks in a day as a security worker. The everyday security tasks of checking bags and facilitating metal detector usage require attention to detail and collaboration and the security team is never 1 person. More unique tasks to solve individual guests' problems involve critical thinking and the ability to stay calm in possibly stressful scenarios. Most roles request a high school diploma, have an requirement of 18 years old, and require a driver's license. Additionally, larger parks may require a specific security guard state certification and/or a first aid certification.

== See also ==
- Amusement park
- Walt Disney World
- Amusement rides

== Bibliography ==
Younger, David (28 March 2016). Theme Park Design & The Art of Themed Entertainment. David Younger. ISBN 0993578918.
