= Walt Disney (disambiguation) =

Walt Disney (1901–1966) was a filmmaker and co-founder of the entertainment empire bearing his name.

Walt Disney may also refer to:

- Walt Disney (film), the 2015 documentary that aired on American Experience
- The Walt Disney Company, an American diversified multinational mass media and entertainment corporation
  - Walt Disney Pictures, a film studio
  - Walt Disney Animation Studios, an animation film studio
- Walt Disney, a Walt Disney anthology television series from 1981 to 1983
- Walt Disney: The Triumph of the American Imagination, a 2006 biography by Neal Gabler
- No. 1 "Walter E. Disney", a locomotive of the Walt Disney World Railroad

== See also ==
- Disney (disambiguation)
- Disney family
- Walt Disney World, a resort in Orlando, Florida
