= Disneyland (disambiguation) =

Disneyland is the original Disney theme park in Anaheim, California.

Disneyland may also refer to:

== Properties of The Walt Disney Company ==
=== Theme parks ===
- Tokyo Disneyland
- Disneyland Park (Paris), formerly "Euro Disneyland"
- Hong Kong Disneyland
- Shanghai Disneyland

=== Resort complexes ===
- Disneyland Resort in Anaheim, California
- Disneyland Paris, formerly "Euro Disney Resort" and "Disneyland Resort Paris"
- Hong Kong Disneyland Resort

=== Media ===
- Disneyland, the title of the Walt Disney anthology television series from 1954 to 1958
- Disneyland: The First 50 Magical Years, a film presentation on the history of Disneyland Park in Anaheim, California

== Other uses ==
- Disneyland, a 1965 novel by Stanisław Dygat, basis for the film Jowita (1967)
- "Disneyland", a solo song in the Broadway musical Smile
- "Disneyland", a song by Five For Fighting on the album The Battle for Everything
- "Disneyland" (Modern Family), an episode of the third season of the American comedy television series Modern Family
- Hamtramck Disneyland, a tourist destination in Hamtramck, Michigan, United States

== See also ==
- Disneyland Hotel (disambiguation)
- "Dizz Knee Land", a song by the rock group dada
- Dreamland in Nara, Japan
- Hong Kong Disneyland Resort
- Magic Kingdom
- Shanghai Disney Resort
- Tokyo Disney Resort
- Walt Disney World
