= Disney Enterprises =

Disney Enterprises may refer to:

- The Walt Disney Company, known as Walt Disney Productions until 1986, a publicly traded company on the New York Stock Exchange.
- Disney Enterprises, Inc., subsidiary of The Walt Disney Company that holds the company's trademarks and copyrights.
- Disney Consumer Products, former division of The Walt Disney Company; succeeded by Disney Parks, Experiences and Consumer Products.
- Retlaw Enterprises, originally Walt Disney Inc., a private company owned separately by Walt Disney himself.
- Walt Disney Imagineering or WED Enterprises, subsidiary of The Walt Disney Company: research, development and engineering.
