= Donald Disney =

Donald Disney from the Avogy, Inc., Cupertino, CA was named Fellow of the Institute of Electrical and Electronics Engineers (IEEE) in 2014 for contributions to power integrated circuits and energy efficiency applications.
