= Flamingo Crossings =

Shopping mall in Winter Garden, Florida

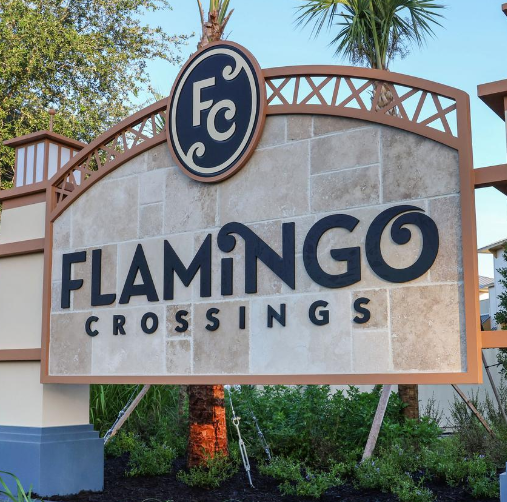
- Flamingo Crossings main entrance signage
- Location: 13200 Hartzog Road; Winter Garden, Florida, United States
- Coordinates: 28°22′49″N 81°37′4″W
- Opened: 2021
- Manager: Disney Experiences
- Owner: The Walt Disney Company
- Website: Official Website

Flamingo Crossings, also known as Flamingo Crossings Town Center, is an outdoor shopping, dining, residential, and entertainment complex at the Walt Disney World Resort in Bay Lake, Florida (with a Winter Garden postal address). First announced by Disney in 2007, the complex officially opened in 2021 with an initial phase of businesses, with more planned in future development.

== History ==
The Walt Disney Company first announced the development of a new entertainment district in 2007, to be called Flamingo Crossings. Disney designated farmland located directly outside what is called the Western Entrance Gateway located on Western Way behind Disney's Animal Kingdom. Shortly after the announcement and initial planning, the Great Recession hindered development plans, and Disney shifted their focus to the redevelopment of the Downtown Disney area into Disney Springs.

Walt Disney Imagineering filed the trademark for the Flamingo Crossings name and insignia in 2015. The Reedy Creek Improvement District (now the Central Florida Tourism Oversight District) approved further enhancements to the area including two skywalks, for guests and Cast Members to safely cross both sides of the development. The first two businesses to open in the Flamingo Crossings area were two connected Marriott International hotels: TownePlace Suites and SpringHill Suites. Construction began in 2014 and the hotels opened in 2016, though further development was delayed inexplicably. The COVID-19 pandemic only further delayed construction into 2021.

Housing for those participating in Orlando's Disney College Program is provided at Flamingo Crossings Village, a large apartment complex that opened in 2021. The complex replaced the former Disney College Program housing complexes, which were adjacently located in the Little Lake Bryan area, nearby International Drive, and the Vistana area, nearby Florida State Road 535. The village is designated into sections, with a nature walking path connecting the two. The complex, which is divided into East and West sections, is managed by American Campus Communities. Cast member housing at Flamingo Crossings Village has been open to any cast member, regardless of being in the Disney College Program or not, since 2023.

== Location ==
The Flamingo Crossings development is located in southwestern Orange County and is accessible from Exit 8 on Florida State Road 429. The Walt Disney World Resort is accessible via Western Way to the east.

North of Flamingo Crossings, Disney plans to open an affordable housing complex open to the general public, near Horizon West. The project aims to, in part, abet Orange County's need for more affordable housing units by constructing 1,400 apartments; however, some residents of Horizon West oppose the project, fearing overcrowding issues. The complex is being developed by the Michaels Organization, and is expected to open its first units in 2026.

== Hotels ==
Designated by The Walt Disney Company as Walt Disney World Gateway Hotels, hotels located at Flamingo Crossings provide shuttles to and from the four Disney theme parks. Hotels located at Flamingo Crossing are:

Hotel name	Opening date	Number of rooms	Owner
TownePlace Suites Orlando at Flamingo Crossings	February 12, 2016	250	Marriott International
SpringHill Suites Orlando at Flamingo Crossings	February 12, 2016	248	Marriott International
Fairfield by Marriott Inn & Suites Orlando at Flamingo Crossings Town Center	July 2021	273	Marriott International
Residence Inn by Marriott at Flamingo Crossings Town Center	December 2021	223	Marriott International
Home2 Suites by Hilton Orlando at Flamingo Crossings Town Center	December 17, 2020	272	Hilton Hotels & Resorts
Homewood Suites by Hilton Orlando at Flamingo Crossings Town Center	February 18, 2021	229	Hilton Hotels & Resorts
