= John Disney =

John Disney may refer to:

- John Disney (antiquarian) (1779–1857), English barrister
- John Disney (ornithologist) (1919–2014), Australian ornithologist
- John Disney (priest) (1677–1730), English clergyman
- John Disney (Unitarian) (1746–1816), English Unitarian minister and biographical writer
