= Disney (crater) =

Crater on Mercury

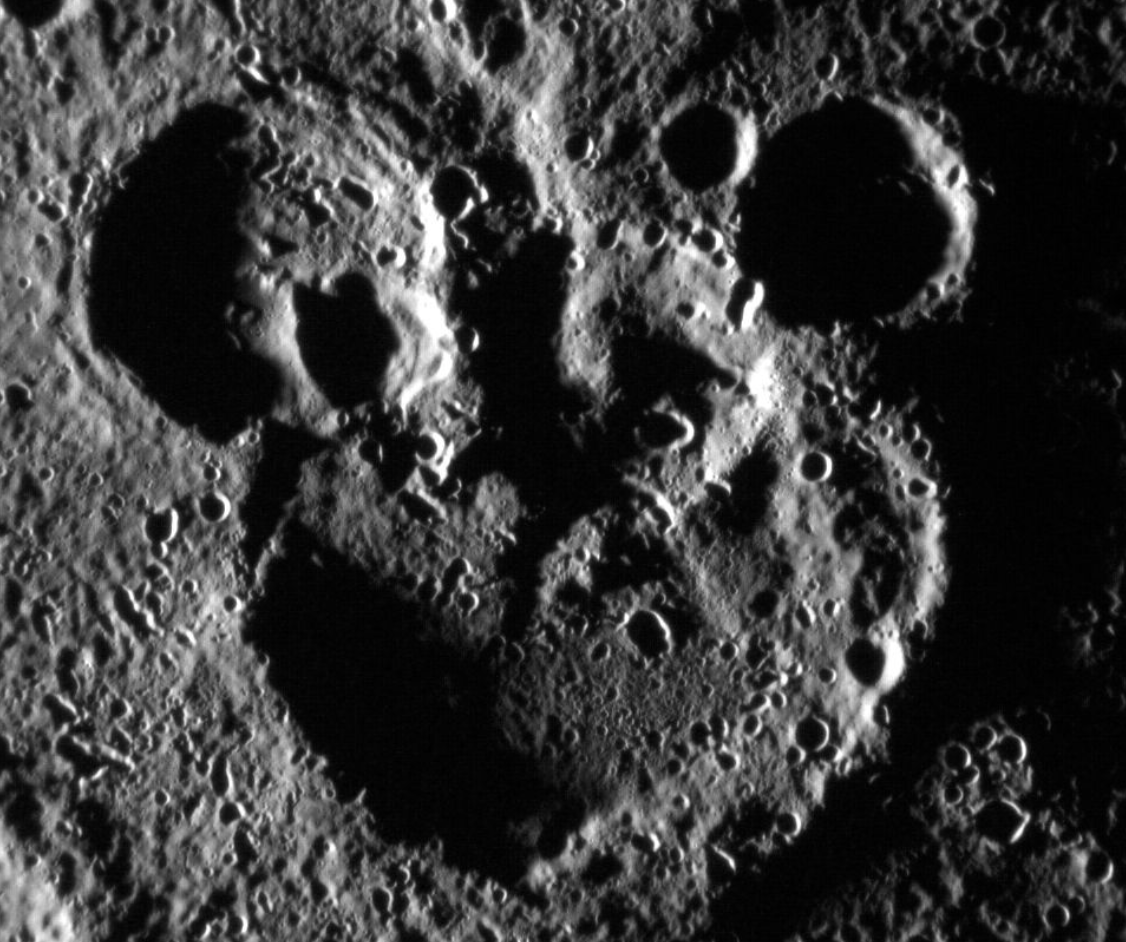
- MESSENGER image of the crater
- Feature type: Impact crater
- Location: Bach quadrangle, Mercury
- Coordinates: 68.15°S 260.2°W
- Diameter: 113 km
- Eponym: Walt Disney

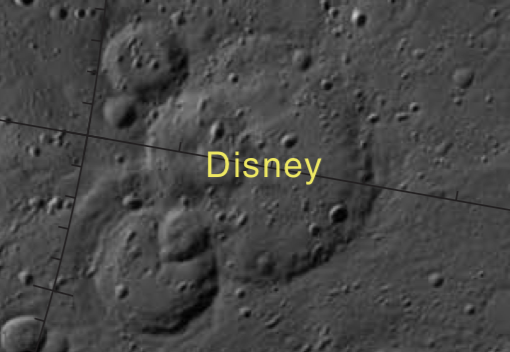
Disney crater labeled by NASA

Disney is an impact crater in the H-15 (Bach) Quadrangle of Mercury. It was approved and adopted by the IAU on Dec 19, 2012. Disney is 113 km (70 mi) in diameter. This crater was named after Walt Disney (Walter Elias), the American entrepreneur, voice actor, film producer, and animator. Disney is one of many craters named after notable art figures; per the Working Group for Planetary System Nomenclature, Mercury's craters are all named after a famous artist, composer, or writer who was influential for more than 50 years and deceased for more than three years at the time the crater was named. Disney was named months after NASA acknowledged it for its resemblance to Mickey Mouse.
