= Disneyland Hotel =

Disneyland Hotel may refer to any of the following properties and/or licensees of The Walt Disney Company and The Oriental Land Company:

- Disneyland Hotel (California)
- Disneyland Hotel (Paris)
- Hong Kong Disneyland Hotel
- Shanghai Disneyland Hotel
- Tokyo Disneyland Hotel

== See also ==
- Category:Hotels in Disney resorts
