= Hamtramck Disneyland =

Folk art display in Michigan, US

Coordinates: 42°24′26.2″N 83°3′31″W

- Artist: Dmytro Szylak
- Year: 1999
- Location: 12087 Klinger, Hamtramck, Michigan, US
- Website: www.hatchart.org/hamtramck-disneyland

Hamtramck Disneyland is a yard of folk art located in Hamtramck, Michigan begun by a man named Dmytro Szylak. Work on the installation started in 1992 and came to be finished in 1999. It is built on a 30-foot backyard on top of two adjacent garages. Dmytro was born in Ukraine, and also once lived in Germany. After immigrating to the United States, he worked for General Motors, but soon after his retirement he felt the need to find a hobby. Dmytro began piling together different objects—some old, some new, and some bought, while others were hand crafted. This towering structure stands tall above his house and garage. Over the course of 12 years, Dmytro continued to add different pieces to his work, which grew to be a collage.

== History ==
The notion of building his artwork began when Dmytro Szylak, a Ukrainian immigrant, retired from General Motors. After working 32 years, Szylak began to search for a hobby, which led to the creative idea of building Hamtramck Disneyland. To utilize his spare time, and with the idea of bringing something new to the city, Szylak began to convert his own backyard into a piece of art. It is a homemade construction built on top of two adjacent garages; a 30-ft. collage filled with pictures of Elvis and other pop stars, year-round Christmas lights, wooden soldiers armed with toy guns, and American flags, among many other things. In 1992, when Szylak started building his work in his backyard, he endured many difficulties. Neighbors and city officials were against Szylak's idea of constructing artwork in his garage rooftop. Szylak was later honored by the mayor of Hamtramck and his works have been displayed in many local art shows. In 2006, Bruce Weber shot a photo shoot with Kate Moss for Women's Wear magazine in the site and around various other places in Detroit. Dmytro Syzlak died on 1 May 2015 at the age of 92. As of June 2015, the future of the work was uncertain—his estate was still tied up in probate court.

The site went on the market on 3 March 2016 and was bought by a local group, Hatch Art, for $100,000. The houses consist of four apartments—three are rented out to defray costs and the other is for an artist in residence.

== Design and theme ==
The work is a collaboration of various ordinary objects put together to form a towering structure. The creator of this collage, Dmytro Szylak, used these objects to create his own interpretation of Disneyland. It is decorated with various objects ranging from mechanical fan propellers to plastic horses and a massive handmade jet aircraft. The major theme that seems very much evident throughout the collage is that of a carnival. One will notice that Dmytro has a recurring design throughout the entire structure. He used plastic horses for a carousel. The primary colors he chose to use were yellow, blue and red. These three colors were on many of the structures, which would signify his heritage. Dmytro was a native Ukrainian and he used the yellow and blue colors on his project to show his pride for his home country. He also used yellow and red for some of his propellers, seeing as he once resided in Germany before immigrating to America.

Dmytro also used many handcrafted cutouts of men in uniform. The wooden cutouts of men were placed under what seemed to be missiles that were intensely decorated with Christmas lights. The men also had one eye painted in the middle of their heads. On the other side of the yard, there stands a windmill which has different cutouts of men and women who appear to be doing manual labor such as cutting a log with a saw and cooking.

Toward the back of the structure, which can be seen through the alley, the structure takes a different turn with more vivid colors and paintings placed next to each other. There are also framed newspapers featuring Dmytro's work, as well as a collage of pictures of him with his artwork. The back of the structure covers both garage tops. From the back the fans and propellers are seen next to each other, giving the structure a flying movement. On the back side there sits a sign saying "Welcome to Art Show".

There are many more frames, and wooden objects such as the Statue of Liberty and soldiers on the back side of this art exhibition. High above all the rest of the objects are a carousel. On that side one can see the distinct connection between his American, Ukrainian, and German heritage.

== Location ==
The exhibition is located in the yard of 12087 Klinger, and is commonly viewed from the alley between Klinger and Sobieski Streets, south of Carpenter Avenue, in Hamtramck, Michigan.
