= The Magic Kingdom: Walt Disney and the American Way of Life =

2001 non-fiction book by Steven Watts

- Author: Steven Watts
- Genre: Biography
- Publisher: University of Missouri Press
- Publication place: USA
- ISBN: 978-0826213792

The Magic Kingdom: Walt Disney and the American Way of Life is a non-fiction book by Steven Watts. Watts is a professor at University of Missouri-Columbia. He has published many articles and essays; however one of the most reviewed and major non-fiction books was The Magic Kingdom.

== Book summary ==
Walt Disney was born in Chicago on December 5, 1901, and lived in Marceline, Missouri from 1905 to 1910. When he was young, he had a talent for drawing and he earned money doing illustrations for newspapers and advertisements. He left home in 1919 and worked at a commercial art studio in Kansas City, after he was fired from the studio, he started his own shop in 1920. Soon, Walt worked at the Kansas City Film Ad Co. which was his first direct employment in animation. In 1922, he started Laugh-O-Gram Films until he went bankrupt. In 1923, he went to Hollywood and started a Los Angeles studio called Disney. And on that train ride from Manhattan to Los Angeles, Mickey Mouse was born.

The Magic Kingdom is a non- fiction book written by Steven Watts. Professor Watts specializes cultural and intellectual history of the United States. In the introduction of this 526-page biography of Walter Elias Disney, Steven Watts explains in detail the obstacles and challenges while undertaking the view upon Walt Disney's lifework. Walt Disney continues to influence the American popular culture and uses mass media to make hundreds of millions of people happy. The book consists of four parts with twenty-two chapters. The book is heavy and overly complex because the author continues to search for answers. It sheds new light on the cultural icon of “Uncle Walt.” Steven Watts discovers deeply into Disney's life, searching and investigating his roles and passions. Furthermore, there are many details about employees, creative and business ventures, analysis of films and construction of theme parks. The historical context provided within the book allows the audience to be part of Disney's history and adventure. This book may not be for everyone since it mainly faces interest in the history of Walt Disney's company, but Steven Watt tackles Disney in a different way from most authors because he focuses on Walt's political motivations and ideologies. He succeeds in producing a new perspective of Disney's impact on different elements of American society. The book consists of detailed analysis of Disney cartoons with full colorful sketches of daily life at the Disney studio with tales about the creation of Disneyland and Disney World. During the mid- century Walt was acknowledged as the spokesman for the American way of life. His amazing creations- from Mickey Mouse to Disneyland transforms American pop culture.

This book also talks about Walt's life and his accomplishments. It goes deep into his life and his early on stages of creating "Disney". It also talks about the hardships the world faced at the time during Walt's success, the big thing was The Great Depression. Walt geared a lot of his films at that time to be very happy, and long films. Since there was not much to do then, going out to see a movie was an outing that everyone did. He made sure he could bring joy to people's life during a very difficult time in society. citation from the book itself (Watts, 1997).

== Reception ==
It was reviewed by The Nation, The Historian, Commentary Magazine, and New York Times. Roy Disney, Walt Disney's nephew, also commented on the monograph.
