= Richard Disney =

Richard Disney may refer to:

- Richard Disney (politician) (by 1505–1578), English member of parliament
- Richard Disney (economist) (born 1950), British economist
- Richard L. Disney (1887–1976), American judge on the United States Tax Court
