= Disney International Programs =

International internship programs

- Former names: World Showcase Fellowship Program; International Hospitality Program; Waterpark/Sports and Recreation Trainee Program; International Culinary Trainee Program; African Cultural Representative Program; International Management Program; Walt Disney World International Program
- Type: International internship
- Established: 1982; 44 years ago
- Parent institution: Disney Programs
- Affiliations: The Walt Disney Company
- Students: 500+ per semester
- Location: Orlando, Florida, United States
- Campus: Urban
- Language: English
- Weekly newsletter: Disney Programs Life Now
- US-based: Disney College Program
- Website: thedisneyip.com

The Disney International Programs (previously named the Walt Disney World International Program) is an international internship program operated by the Disney Programs division of The Walt Disney Company at the Walt Disney World Resort in Lake Buena Vista, Florida, United States. These programs recruit participants and college students (18 years and older) from outside the United States and its territories for year-long cultural exchanges with paid positions and summer-long paid internships, working at the Walt Disney World Resort. The programs are designed to attract international workers and students and share many similarities with the US-based Disney College Program and its philosophy of Living, Learning and Earning.

== Previous programs ==
Originally, Disney International Programs operated several different types of programs. Program length, work locations, job responsibilities, living arrangements, pay and required qualifications varied depending on the program which was applied for. Once all the programs were merged, they became one Walt Disney World International Program, now the Disney International Programs. Previous programs included:

- World Showcase Fellowship Program: similar to the Cultural Representative Program but with a structured educational program and community involvement.
- International Hospitality Program: aimed to students fluent in Japanese, Portuguese, French or German, pursuing a career in hospitality. Participants were able to experience different work roles all over the resort.
- Waterpark/Sports and Recreation Trainee Program: training and development opportunities in Typhoon Lagoon and Blizzard Beach water parks as well as recreation locations for students interested in the recreation/leisure industry.
- International Culinary Trainee Program: for participants with 2-3 years of experience in the kitchen area of the food service industry, aiming to develop skills in Disney's food-service locations.
- African Cultural Representative Program: for African participants working at Disney's Animal Kingdom and/or Disney's Animal Kingdom Lodge, similar to the Cultural Representative Program.
- International Management Program: primarily for students who had completed one of the above programs, considering experience in management at Walt Disney World Resort.

== Application process ==
Eligibility is open to applicants who reside outside the United States or their territories and are not American citizens. Applicants contact one of the contracted in-country agencies that assist with international applications or the International Casting office with a résumé and cover letter. Some countries hold a preliminary phone interview before issuing an invitation to a scheduled Disney International Programs presentation and interview. Qualified candidates receive an invitation approximately four weeks prior to the presentation and interview and in some cases, an invitation is issued at the end of the phone interview. Presentations outline key components of the program and provide further information on the program's offerings. In some cases, applicants may have to travel abroad to meet with a recruiter from Disney Worldwide Services.

== Current programs ==
Over the years, several International Programs were operated and subsequently suspended, a new one was created for Disney's Animal Kingdom theme park and ultimately in 2004, all the Walt Disney World International Programs were combined into two new all-encompassing programs, namely the Walt Disney World Cultural Representative Program and the Walt Disney World International College Program. A new seasonal worker program has also been launched which initially required applicants to have previously completed an International Program in order to be eligible, but this requirement was soon waived due to insufficient applications. The locations and positions available to participants on International Programs vary according to program and preference in that order.

=== Cultural Representative Program ===
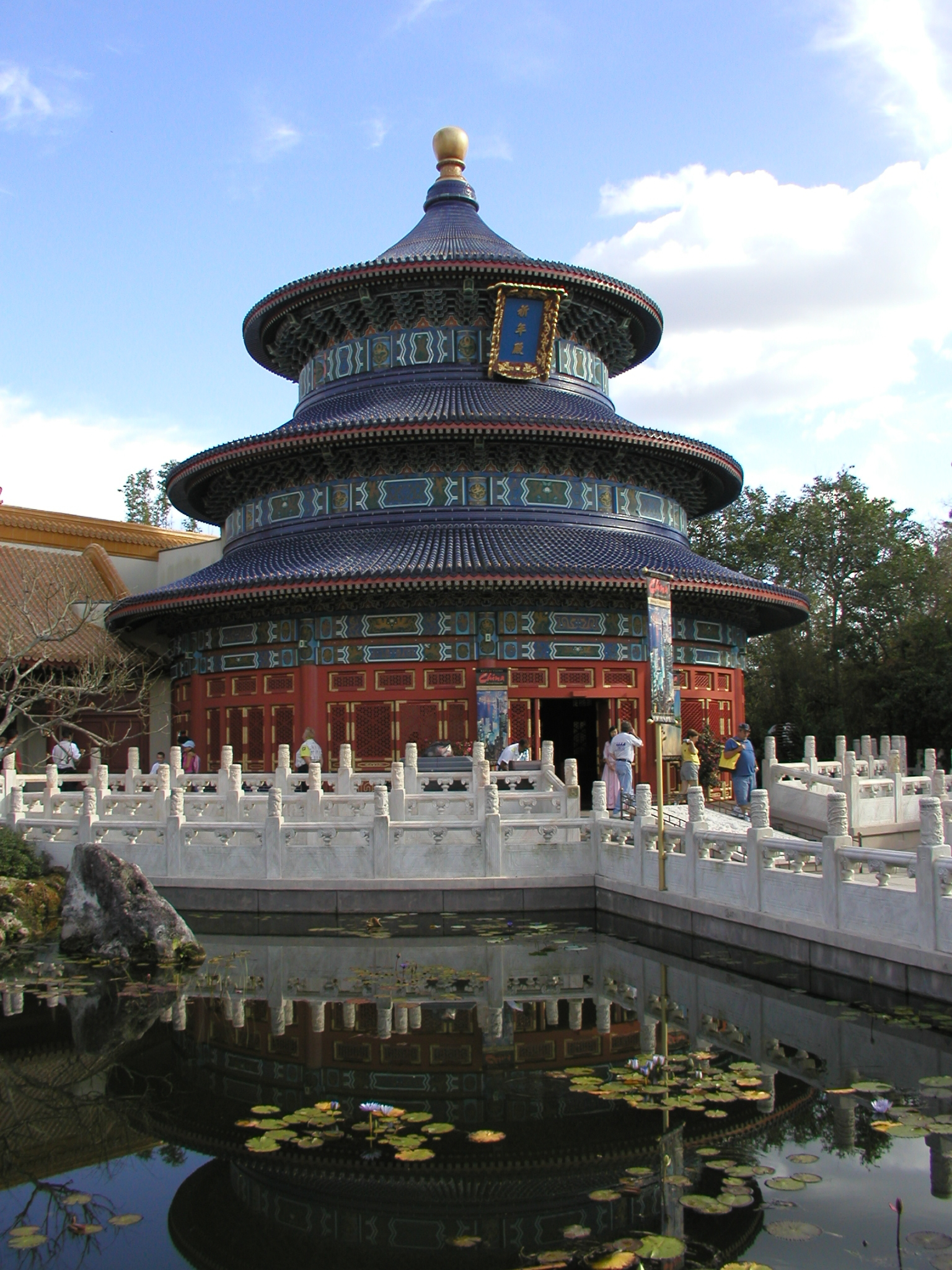
China Pavilion at Epcot

The Cultural Representative Program (CRP) showcases participants' culture and customs with guests visiting the Walt Disney World Resort, over the course of approximately a year. To qualify for this program, applicants must "authentically represent" one of the countries or regions recreated at a Walt Disney World theme park or resort. During their interview, applicants fill out their role preferences from most interested to least. The applicant's employer may not be Disney once a position has been offered, but an "operating participant" instead, trading within Walt Disney World, in which the participant would not be eligible for the same benefits as regular Disney Cast Members.

Participants in the Cultural Representative Program perform their roles at Epcot's World Showcase, Disney's Animal Kingdom, Disney's Animal Kingdom Lodge, or a combination of them, while for guest relations positions, participants are assigned to one of the four theme parks or Disney Springs. The Cultural Representative Program has different options open to applicants during their application process, depending on the pavilion's offerings. (Note: For example, Norwegian applicants may apply for attractions operator on Frozen Ever After at the Norway Pavilion at Epcot. However, this would not be the same case for British applicants, since the United Kingdom pavilion does not have an attraction.) The exact location for positions varies according to the country the participant represents.

=== International College Program ===
The International College Program (ICP) is a program similarly based on the Disney College Program, designed for international students who are currently enrolled in an accredited semester-program college or university, pursuing a 3-to-4 year degree. Applicants must be between academic years and as such, the program will run during their summer vacation, varying in length.

- Summer International College Program: students participate in a program similar to the Disney College Program's summer program, which coincides with their summer vacation/holiday from their college or university. This program, with a duration of two to three months, is reserved for students currently enrolled in an accredited semester-program college or university and are pursuing a 3-to-4-year degree.
- Academic Exchange International College Program: students participate in a program which also mirrors the Disney College Program but may spend up to a full year working at the resort while taking coursework through the DCP and distance-learning at their U.S. sponsoring university. Alternatively, students may spend five months studying at their U.S. sponsoring university and seven months working and taking classes at the Walt Disney World Resort. This program is available to current students and recent university graduates.

During their interview, applicants fill out their role preferences, from most interested to least, for their International College Program, often assigned to roles based on seasonal need and may be rotated based on peak time operational needs. Participants in the International College Program may work in any of Walt Disney World's four theme parks, two water parks or on-site resort hotels and are often rotated based on peak-time operational need and may be cross-trained as such from position to position and park to park.

=== H-2B Alumni Program ===
The H-2B Alumni Program allows participants to work at the resort on an H-2B seasonal work visa as a seasonal employee while in the United States. Candidates must complete their current program successfully with a confirmed rehire status and return to school for one semester in their home country before returning on an H-2B visa. The available options for H-2B participants, in regards to available roles, are similar to those for the International College Program.

== Housing ==
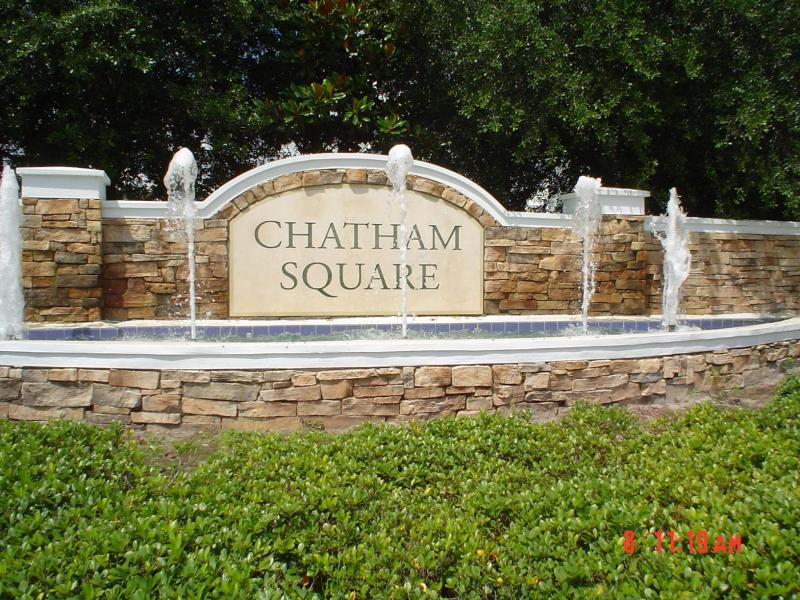
Entrance to Chatham Square

From the beginning of the program until 1988, college program participants resided in Snow White Village Campground, an off-property mobile home park and the remainder of Lake Vista Village apartments in Kissimmee. In 1987, a new company-sponsored gated-community apartment complex, Vista Way, was opened for college program participants nearby Lake Buena Vista, located much closer to the Disney property. By 1988, all participants were fully relocated out of Snow White Village Campground, which was later converted into a vacationing site.

Three additional company-sponsored gated-community apartment complexes, The Commons, Chatham Square and Patterson Court, opened as the Disney College Program expanded to accommodate more participants, all adjacently-located in Little Lake Bryan, less than three miles away from Vista Way. Participants in Orlando were provided the option to either live off-property or reside in one of the four complexes, until they were closed in March 2020 due to the impact of the COVID-19 pandemic. Initially, The Commons was the only complex where all international participants were housed in after it opened. Though the Disney College Program allowed participants to reside off-site, international participants were not allowed the same due to conditions in their visas.

In June 2021, Flamingo Crossings Village, a new and more modern apartment complex located in Winter Garden, about four miles from Disney's Animal Kingdom, became the new home of the Orlando Disney College Program participants. Though its original opening was interrupted by the coronavirus pandemic, it opened in June 2021 along with the return of the Disney College Program to Orlando. The relocation of Disney College Program participants to Flamingo Crossings Village was originally planned to take place mid-2020, when the four existing housing complexes were scheduled to close and sold off.

== Coronavirus impact ==
On March 14, 2020, the Disney International Programs were suspended due to the ongoing worldwide outbreak of the COVID-19 pandemic and its spread to Florida. International participants actively enrolled during this time in company-sponsored housing were asked to vacate in a short period of time, as well as Disney College Program and culinary students, providing full credit and completion of the program in return. Shortly after, the Walt Disney World Resort closed operations, initially until April 19, 2020. On April 6, 2020, the suspension of the program was extended to those applicants with May 2020 arrival dates, after The Walt Disney Company extended the closure of its resorts until early June 2020.

On July 2, 2020, the Disney International Programs and the Disney College Program were suspended for the rest of 2020, as the coronavirus pandemic further impacted operations of both the Walt Disney World Resort and Disneyland Resort. On July 14, 2020, less than a week after the Walt Disney World Resort reopened during the coronavirus pandemic, the Cultural Representative Program was suspended indefinitely, impacting those who were actively participating at the time and future participants who were accepted for the Fall 2020 semester.

On March 9, 2021, at the Walt Disney Company's shareholder's meeting, then-CEO Bob Chapek expressed interest in resuming operations of the Disney College Program by the end of 2021. He also expressed interest in inviting back those participants who were impacted by the closure of the program in 2020, so they can properly experience and fulfil their programs. On May 3, 2021, Disney Programs announced a June 2021 return of the Disney College Program in Orlando, though no announcement was immediately made for the International Programs.

On March 25, 2022, Disney Programs announced the Disney International Programs would return to Orlando with the Cultural Representative Program for August 2022.

On April 11, 2022, Disney Programs announced the return of the Cultural Exchange Program for June 2022 for select countries.

== See also ==
- Disney College Program
- Walt Disney World Resort
