= Disney College Program =

Internship program in Orlando, Florida

- Other name: DCP
- Former names: Magic Kingdom College Program (MKCP); Walt Disney World College Program (WDWCP); Disney Theme Parks and Resorts College Program
- Type: College internship
- Established: 1981; 45 years ago
- Parent institution: Disney Programs
- Affiliations: The Walt Disney Company
- Students: 4,000+ per semester
- Location: Orlando, Florida, United States
- Campus: Urban
- Language: English
- Weekly newsletter: Disney Programs Life Now
- International: Disney International Programs
- Website: disneycollegeprogram.com

The Disney College Program (DCP) is a United States national internship program operated by the Disney Programs division of The Walt Disney Company, located at the Walt Disney World Resort in Orlando, and formerly at the Disneyland Resort in Anaheim. The program recruits college students (ages 18 and older) of all majors for a semester-long paid work experience program with the option of extending to almost a full year.

== History ==
The first Disney College Program began in 1981 as the Magic Kingdom College Program (MKCP) and initially consisted of just over 200 students from 20 schools working only at Magic Kingdom, in Bay Lake, ten years after the theme park opened. In October 1982, the program expanded offerings to Epcot, when the theme park opened, and its name changed to the Walt Disney World College Program (WDWCP), employing approximately 500 college students each spring, summer and fall session. From the beginning of the program until 1988, program participants resided in Snow White Village Campground, an off-property mobile home park and the remainder of Lake Vista Village apartments in Kissimmee. In 1987, a new company-sponsored gated-community apartment complex, Vista Way, was opened for college program participants nearby Lake Buena Vista, located much closer to the Disney property. By 1988, all participants were fully relocated out of Snow White Village Campground, which was later converted into a vacationing site.

Following the massive growth of the Walt Disney World Resort in the 1990s and the widespread popularity of the internet, the program grew substantially, seeing three new participant housing complexes built and many more colleges represented. An average of 4,000 students participate each spring, summer and fall session, representing at least 301 colleges and universities. In August 2006, the program expanded to the Disneyland Resort and was renamed the Disney Theme Parks and Resorts College Program. The program's opportunities are available at all theme parks, resorts and shopping districts of the Walt Disney World Resort and the Disneyland Resort, officially changing its name to the Disney College Program, which is colloquially shortened and referred to as the DCP.

In March 2020, due to the COVID-19 pandemic emerging in Florida and in California, the Disney College Program, Culinary Program, Professional Internships and International Programs were suspended from both the Orlando and Anaheim resorts. By June 2022, all programs returned to the Orlando resort, while they were never reinstated in the Anaheim resort.

== Application process ==
=== Eligibility ===
Eligible applicants are those who reside in the United States or their territories, who possess American citizenship, (Note: For example, students born in Puerto Rico qualify to apply for the Disney College Program, and not the International Programs, given the fact that they are American citizens by birth.) are students aged 18 and older prior to the expected arrival date and are actively enrolled in an accredited semester-program university or college as a full-time or part-time student. Students actively enrolled in their final semester (Note: In cases when a student's final semester takes place in the first half of their school year, they are eligible to apply even if they are no longer taking classes in what would be their second semester of the school year.) of an accredited semester-program university or college are also eligible to apply to be accepted for the following program season or apply within a year of graduation. Students must complete at least one semester of university or college before entering the Disney College Program.

Programs last between five and seven months, though the culinary program's length depends on the student's school schedule. Once a student is approaching the end of their program, they may extend for an additional five months with the option to change to a different position. Prior to 2020, participants were also given the option of transferring from their current resort (Orlando or Anaheim) to the other.

== Housing ==
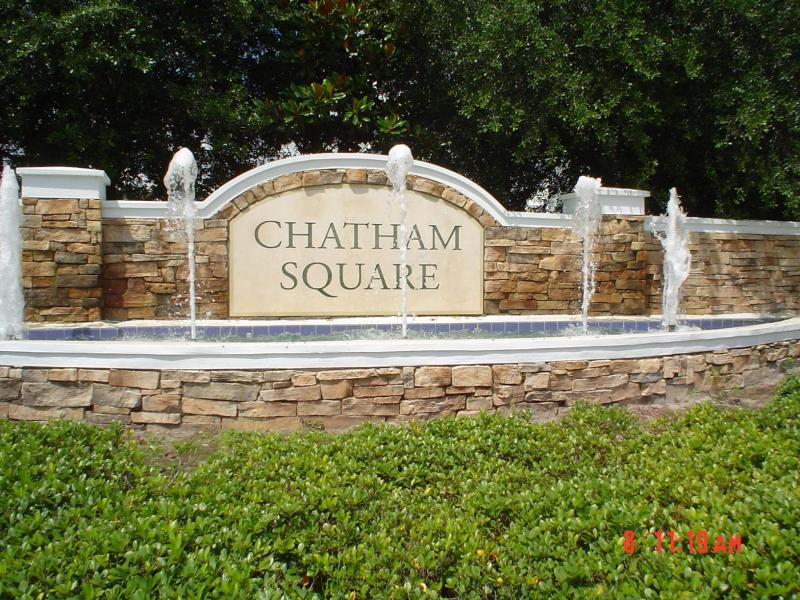
Entrance to Chatham Square

From the beginning of the program until 1988, college program participants resided in Snow White Village Campground, an off-property mobile home park and the remainder of Lake Vista Village apartments in Kissimmee. In 1987, a new company-sponsored gated-community apartment complex, Vista Way, was opened for college program participants nearby Lake Buena Vista, located much closer to the Disney property. By 1988, all participants were fully relocated out of Snow White Village Campground, which was later converted into a vacationing site.

Three additional company-sponsored gated-community apartment complexes, The Commons, Chatham Square and Patterson Court, opened as the Disney College Program expanded to accommodate more participants, all adjacently-located in Little Lake Bryan, less than three miles away from Vista Way. Participants in Orlando were provided the option to either live off-property or reside in one of the four complexes, until they were closed in March 2020 due to the impact of the coronavirus pandemic.

In June 2021, Flamingo Crossings Village, a new and more modern apartment complex located in Winter Garden, about four miles from Disney's Animal Kingdom, became the new home of the Orlando Disney College Program participants. Plans for the complex, announced in 2018, called for 2,600 apartment units to house Disney College Program and International Program participants. Though its original opening was interrupted by the coronavirus pandemic, it opened in June 2021 along with the return of the Disney College Program to Orlando. The relocation of Disney College Program participants to Flamingo Crossings Village was originally planned to take place mid-2020, when the four existing housing complexes were scheduled to be close and sold off.

== Other programs ==
=== Disney Culinary Program ===
The Disney Culinary Program is a subdivision of the Disney College Program that provides the same experiences but aimed at students enrolled in an accredited culinary school. The application process is the same but with specific requirements, mainly, being enrolled in an accredited culinary school in order to receive credit and also upholding the Disney Look. International students are also eligible to apply.

=== Disney Professional Internships ===
Disney Professional Internships are offered by the Disney Programs division of the Walt Disney Company, aimed at students who are pursuing a professional career in the company, such as in business, marketing, sales, production, entertainment, etc. Internships are offered in many of the company's assets and divisions such as Walt Disney Studios, Disney Parks, Marvel Entertainment, ABC, ESPN, among others. The experiences are the same as the Disney College Program, with the exception of sponsored housing and transportation, which interns are required to provide for themselves since offerings are also available in different cities in the United States and even worldwide. Students participating in the Disney College Program are eligible, as well as students who are actively enrolled in an accredited college or university, or students who have graduated from a college or university within eighteen months.

=== Disney International Programs ===
The Disney International Programs are based on the same values and experiences as the Disney College Program but aimed at international students, available only at the Walt Disney World Resort in Orlando.

== Coronavirus impact ==
On March 14, 2020, the Disney College Program, Culinary Program, Professional Internships and International Programs were suspended due to the ongoing worldwide outbreak of the coronavirus and its spread to Florida and to California. Active participants who resided in company-sponsored housing, including international and culinary students, were asked to vacate within a short period of time, providing full credit and completion of the program in return. Shortly after, the Disneyland Resort and the Walt Disney World Resort closed operations, initially until April 19, 2020. The suspension of the program was later extended to accepted applicants with May 2020 arrival dates, after the Walt Disney Company extended the closure of its resorts.

In July 2020, the Disney College Program and the Disney International Programs were suspended for the rest of 2020, as the coronavirus pandemic further impacted operations of both the Orlando and Anaheim resorts; both the Disney College Program and the International Programs were suspended indefinitely in December 2020, as Disney Programs cited uncertainty of when it will be able to resume in the future.

On March 9, 2021, at the Walt Disney Company's shareholder's meeting, then-CEO Bob Chapek expressed interest in resuming operations of the Disney College Program by the end of 2021, and inviting back those who were impacted by the closure of the program in 2020, so they can properly experience and fulfil their programs. On May 3, 2021, Disney Programs announced a June 2021 return of the Disney College Program in Orlando with priority given for 2020 applicants to reapply, though no announcement was immediately made for the program in Anaheim, the Culinary Program, Professional Internships or the International Programs. Later, the Culinary Program returned to Orlando for the August 2021 semester.

== See also ==
- Disney International Programs
- Walt Disney World Resort
- Disneyland Resort
